= AIAW women's basketball tournament =

American collegiate basketball tournament (1972–1982)

AIAW Women's Basketball Tournament
- Formerly: CIAW Tournament
- Sport: Basketball
- Founded: 1972
- Folded: 1982
- Replaced by: NCAA tournament
- No. of teams: 16 / 24
- Country: United States
- Most titles: Immaculata, Delta State (3 each)
- Broadcaster: NBC (championship game)

The AIAW women's basketball tournament was a national tournament for women's collegiate basketball teams in the United States, held annually from 1972 to 1982. The winners of the AIAW tournaments from 1972 to 1981 are recognized as the national champions for those years.

== History ==
The AIAW tournament was preceded by a tournament sponsored by the Commission on Intercollegiate Athletics for Women (CIAW), which was held from 1969 to 1971.

Sixteen teams were invited to the AIAW tournament following qualifying rounds played on college campuses (except 24 teams were invited for the 1980 and 1981 tournaments). Ten of the sixteen teams were the winners of regional tournaments. The country had nine regions, but the Eastern regional was subdivided in a Region 1A and a Region 1B. The winners of those regional championships automatically proceeded to the national tournament, then a selection committee chose additional teams based upon considerations for individual team performance and geographical balance. Beginning in 1975, the AIAW divided its teams into divisions, and held separate tournaments for Division II and Division III teams.

The AIAW tournament was discontinued after the NCAA began sponsoring a women's collegiate basketball tournament in 1982. (In 1982, both the AIAW and NCAA sponsored competing tournaments.)

Pre-NCAA statistics, based on AIAW Archives, Special Collections, University of Maryland Libraries.

== Division I/large college ==
=== CIAW ===
- 1969 West Chester (Pennsylvania) def. Western Carolina 65-39 (CIAW invitational tournament, six player format)
- 1970 Cal State-Fullerton def. West Chester 50-46 (CIAW invitational tournament, six player format)
- 1971 Mississippi State College for Women def. West Chester 57-55 (CIAW qualification tournament)

=== AIAW ===
Year	Winner	Score	Opponent	Venue
1972	Immaculata	52–48	West Chester State	Normal, Illinois
1973	Immaculata (2)	59–52	Queens College	Flushing, New York
1974	Immaculata (3)	68–53	Mississippi College	Manhattan, Kansas
1975	Delta State	90–81	Immaculata	Harrisonburg, Virginia
1976	Delta State (2)	69–64	Immaculata	State College, Pennsylvania
1977	Delta State (3)	68–55	LSU	Minneapolis, Minnesota
1978	UCLA	90–74	Maryland	Los Angeles, California
1979	Old Dominion	75–65	Louisiana Tech	Greensboro, North Carolina
1980	Old Dominion (2)	68–53	Tennessee	Mount Pleasant, Michigan
1981	Louisiana Tech	79–59	Tennessee	Eugene, Oregon
1982	Rutgers	83–77	Texas	Philadelphia, Pennsylvania

=== Team appearances ===
The code in each cell represents the furthest the team made it in the respective tournament:

- CH National Champion
- RU National Runner-up
- SF , 3rd , 4th Semifinals (3rd-4th place)
- QF , 5th , 6th , T8 Quarterfinals (5th-8th place)
- T12 , T16 Round of 12 or 16 (9th-16th place)
- T24 Play-in Round (Starting 1980) Round of 24 (17th-24th place)

Team	Apps.	72	73	74	75	76	77	78	79	80	81	82
Arkansas	1											T16
Baylor	2					T12	5th					
Boise State	1				T16							
Boston University	1									T24		
Brigham Young	3							T12	T12	T16		
California	1											QF
UC Riverside	1		T12									
Cal State Fullerton	5	3rd		T12	3rd	T12	T16					
Central Missouri State	2									T24		T16
Cheyney State	2									T24	QF	
Clemson	1										T24	
Colorado	2										T24	T16
Delta State	4				CH	CH	CH					QF
Detroit	1									T24		
District of Columbia	1				T8							
East Carolina	1		T12									
East Stroudsburg State	2		QF	T16								
Fordham	1								QF			
Fresno State	1			T16								
Georgia Southern	1											T16
Georgia State	1										T24	
Illinois State	3	T16		T12							T16	
Immaculata	6	CH	CH	CH	RU	RU	4th					
Indiana	3	QF	4th	T8								
Indiana State	1		T16									
Jackson State	1										T16	
James Madison	1				T16							
Kansas	3								T12	T16	T16	
Kansas State	6		T12	T16	6th		T12		T12	T16		
Kentucky	2									T24	T16	
Lehman	1		T16									
Long Beach State	6	T12	T16			T12			T12	QF	QF	
Louisiana Tech	3								RU	4th	CH	
LSU	1						RU					
Maryland	4							RU	QF	QF	QF	
Mercer	2		QF							T24		
Miami (OH)	1											T16
Michigan State	1						T16					
Minnesota	3						T16				T24	QF
Mississippi	1							T12				
Mississippi College	3			RU		T8	T12					
Mississippi Women	1	4th										
Missouri	2						T12	T12				
Montana	1											T16
Montclair State	2					6th		3rd				
North Carolina State	3							QF		T16	T16	
Northern Illinois	1	QF										
Northwestern	3								QF	T16	T24	
Ohio State	2				T12			T16				
Old Dominion	3								CH	CH	3rd	
Oregon	2									T16	T16	
Oregon State	2								T16		T24	
Penn State	1					T16						
Phillips	1	QF										
Portland State	1					T16						
Providence	1									T16		
Queens (NY)	5	T12	RU	T8	T12	T12		QF				
Rutgers	4								T12	T24	T16	CH
St. John's (NY)	1											T16
Saint Joseph's	1						T12					
San Francisco	1									T24		
South Carolina	2		T12							3rd		
South Dakota State	1	T16										
USC	2									T24	4th	
Southern Connecticut	8	T12	3rd	3rd	4th	T8	6th	QF	T12			
Stephen F. Austin	6		QF	T12	T12			QF		QF	T16	
Syracuse	1										T24	
Tennessee	5						3rd	T16	3rd	RU	RU	
Tennessee Tech	5	T16		6th	T12	5th	T8					
Tennessee–Martin	1	QF										
Texas	3									T16	T24	RU
UCLA	3							CH	4th		QF	
Utah	3					T16	T8	T16				
Utah State	4	T12	T16	T16	T16							
Valdosta State	2							T12	T12			
Vanderbilt	1											T16
Villanova	1											SF
Washington	1							T16				
Washington State	1	T16										
Wayland Baptist	6			5th	5th	3rd		4th	QF			SF
West Chester State	1	RU										
West Georgia	1				T16							
Western Washington	3		QF	T12			T16					
William Penn	3			4th	T8	4th						
Wisconsin	1											QF
Wisconsin–La Crosse	1					T16						

== Division II/small college ==
=== Results ===
Year	Winner	Score	Opponent	Venue
1975	Phillips	—	Talladega	Pueblo, Colorado
1976	Berry (GA)	68–62	West Georgia	Ashland, Ohio
1977	Southeastern Louisiana	92–76	Phillips	Pomona, California
1978	High Point	92–88	South Carolina State	Florence, South Carolina
1979	South Carolina State	75–65	Dayton	Fargo, North Dakota
1980	Dayton	83–53	College of Charleston	Dayton, Ohio
1981	William Penn	64–51	College of Charleston	Dayton, Ohio
1982	Francis Marion	92–63	College of Charleston	Charleston, South Carolina

=== Appearances ===
Team	Apps.	76	77	78	79	80	81	82
Abilene Christian	1						QF	
Air Force	2				R16	R24		
Arkansas–Monticello	1			R16				
Arkansas Tech	1					R16		
Ashland	2	4th	QF					
Berry (GA)	4	CH	3rd	3rd		R16		
Biola	5	R16	4th	4th			R16	QF
Cal State Los Angeles	1					R16		
Cal Poly Pomona	4	R16	QF			QF	3rd	
Carson-Newman	1					R24		
Centenary (LA)	1							FR
Charleston (WV) (Morris Harvey)	2				QF	QF		
College of Charleston	3					RU	RU	RU
Colorado College	2		R16				R16	
Dayton	5		R16	R16	RU	CH	R16	
Eastern Connecticut	1		R16					
Eastern Illinois	1						QF	
Eastern New Mexico	1			R16				
Eastern Washington	2			R16	R16			
Emporia State	1				R16			
Florida International	1							FR
Fordham	1			R16				
Fort Lewis	1	R16						
Francis Marion	4	QF	QF	R16				CH
George Williams	1	R16						
Grand View	1	R16						
High Point	3		QF	CH	QF			
Hofstra	1					R24		
Idaho	2					R24	R16	
Langston	1					R16		
Lenoir-Rhyne	2					QF	4th	
Livingston	2					R16		QF
Louisiana College	2					4th	QF	
Midland Lutheran	1			QF				
Montana State Billings (Eastern Montana)	2	R16	R16					
Morgan State	2					QF	R16	
Nebraska–Omaha	1					R24		
Niagara	2				3rd	R24		
North Dakota State	2				R16			SF
Pepperdine	2			QF	R16			
Phillips (OK)	2	3rd	RU					
Princeton	1	QF						
St. John Fisher	1					R16		
St. Peter's	1					R16		
Salisbury State	1		R16					
San Francisco	1				R16			
Seton Hall	2			R16	QF			
Seton Hill	1	R16						
Shorter	1			R16				
South Carolina State	3			RU	CH	R16		
Southeast Missouri State	1					R24		
Southeastern Louisiana	4	R16	CH	QF	R16			
Southwest Missouri State	1						R16	
Springfield	1						R16	
Tarkio	2	QF	R16					
Texas Wesleyan	1				R16			
Tougaloo	1				QF			
Tuskegee	2				4th		QF	
Union (KY)	1	QF						
Ursinus	1		R16					
West Georgia	3	RU	R16			R24		
William Carey	1						R16	
William Penn	4			QF		3rd	CH	SF

== Division III ==
=== Results ===
Year	Winner	Score	Opponent	Venue
1980	Worcester State	76–73	Wisconsin–La Crosse	Spokane, Washington
1981	Wisconsin–La Crosse	79–71	Mount Mercy	Dayton, Ohio
1982	Concordia–Moorhead	73–72	Mount Mercy	Cedar Rapids, Iowa

=== Appearances ===
Team	Apps.	80	81	82
Adrian	1	R16		
Aquinas	1			T8
Bethany	1		R16	
Biola	1	QF		
Bridgewater (VA)	1	R24		
UC Davis	1		QF	
Christopher Newport	1	R24		
Columbia (SC)	2	R24	R16	
Concordia–Moorhead	1			CH
Concordia (OR)	1		R16	
Eastern Connecticut State	1	R16		
Elizabethtown	2	R24	QF	
Juniata	1	QF		
Knoxville	2		QF	QF
Lee (TN)	1	QF		
Linfield	1	R24		
Malone	1			QF
McMurry	1	R16		
Millersville State	1			4th
Minnesota–Morris	1	R16		
Mount Mercy	3	4th	RU	RU
Notre Dame de Namur	1	R16		
Pacific Lutheran	1	R24		
Pitt Johnstown	2	R16	4th	
Rhode Island College	1		R16	
Roanoke	1		R16	
San Francisco State	2	QF	QF	
Scranton	1	3rd		
Spring Arbor	2	R24	R16	
Tarleton State	2	R16	R16	
Western Oregon	1	R16		
Willamette	1	R24		
Wisconsin–La Crosse	2	RU	CH	
Wisconsin–Whitewater	2		R16	3rd
Worcester State	2	CH	3rd	

== Junior/community college ==
- 1973 Mississippi Gulf Coast Junior College
- 1974 Anderson College (South Carolina)
- 1975 Anderson College
- 1976 Anderson College
- 1977 Anderson College

== See also ==
- National Women's Invitational Tournament
- NAIA Women's Basketball Championships – began 1981
- NCAA Division I women's basketball tournament – began 1982
- NCAA Division II women's basketball tournament – began 1982
- NCAA Division III women's basketball tournament – began 1982
- Association for Intercollegiate Athletics for Women
- Major women's sport leagues in North America

== Sources ==
- Hult, Joan S.; Trekell, Marianna (1991). A Century of women's basketball : From Frailty to Final Four. Reston, Va: National Association for Girls and Women in Sport. ISBN 9780883144909.
