= 1982 NCAA Division II women's basketball tournament =

American collegiate basketball tournament

- Teams: 16
- Finals site: , (Massachusetts) Springfield, MA
- Champions: Cal Poly Pomona Broncos (1st title)
- Runner-up: Tuskegee Golden Tigers (1st title game)
- Third place: Mount St. Mary's Mountaineers (1st Final Four)
- Fourth place: Oakland Pioneers (1st Final Four)
- Winning coach: Darlene May (CPP) (1st title)

The 1982 NCAA Division II women's basketball tournament was the inaugural tournament hosted by the NCAA to determine the team national champion of women's collegiate basketball among its Division II membership in the United States. The 1982 AIAW Division II championship was a separate tournament.

Cal Poly Pomona defeated Tuskegee in the championship game, 93–74, to claim the first-ever NCAA Division II national title.

The championship rounds were contested at the Springfield Civic Center in Springfield, Massachusetts, hosted by Springfield College.

== Qualifying ==
Sixteen teams participated in the inaugural tournament field.

== Brackets - First and Second rounds ==
Visiting team listed first

First round Sweet 16; March 4
Springfield | 68
Bentley | 57
Clark (GA) | 54
Tuskegee | 67

Second round Elite Eight; March 13
Springfield | 61
Tuskegee | 66

First round Sweet 16; March 6
Chapman | 49
NE Missouri State | 46
Northern Kentucky | 75
Oakland | 77

Second round Elite Eight; March 13
Chapman | 61
Oakland | 73

First round Sweet 16; March 6 and March 4
Norfolk State | 81*
Pitt–Johnstown | 80
Virginia Union | 51
Mount St. Mary's | 71

Second round Elite Eight; March 12
Norfolk State | 64
Mount St. Mary's | 82

First round Sweet 16; March 6
Fort Valley State | 75
Nebraska–Omaha | 74
San Francisco State | 60
Cal Poly Pomona | 81

Second round Elite Eight; March 13
Fort Valley State | 80
Cal Poly Pomona | 95

== Final Four – Springfield, Massachusetts ==
Location: Springfield Civic Center Host: Springfield College

National semifinals Final Four; March 18
Tuskegee | 88
Oakland | 82
Mount St. Mary's | 58
Cal Poly Pomona | 71

National championship March 20
Tuskegee | 74
Cal Poly Pomona | 93
Third place
Oakland | 62
Mount St. Mary's | 73

== All-tournament team ==
- Jackie White, Cal Poly Pomona (MOP)
- Annette Chester, Tuskegee
- Carol Welch, Cal Poly Pomona
- Brenda McLean, Oakland
- Becky Lovett, Mount St. Mary's

== See also ==
- 1982 NCAA Division I women's basketball tournament
- 1982 NCAA Division III women's basketball tournament
- 1982 AIAW National Division I Basketball Championship
- 1982 NAIA women's basketball tournament
- 1982 NCAA Division II men's basketball tournament
