= Delta State Lady Statesmen basketball =

Delta State Lady Statesmen
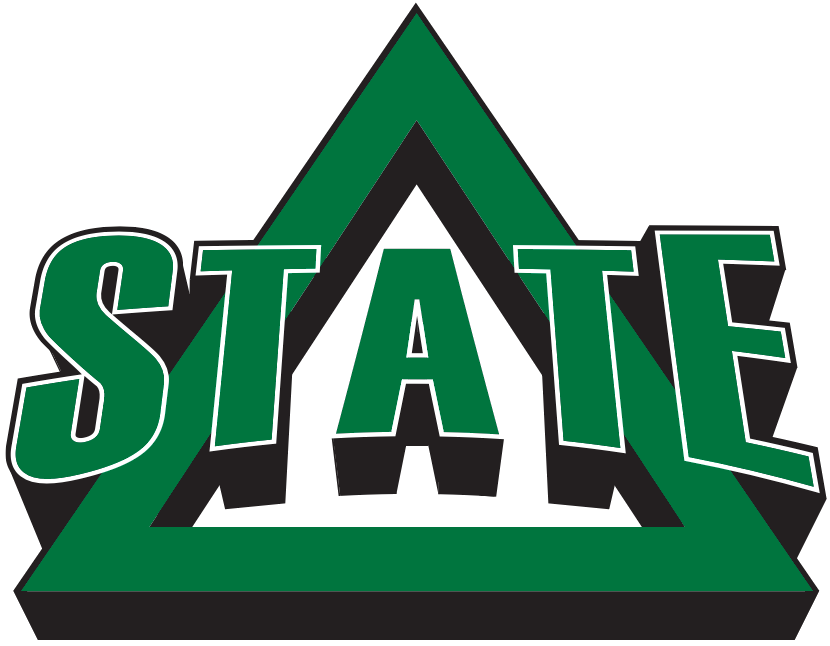
- University: Delta State University
- Head coach: Tracy Stewart-Lange (5th season)
- Location: Cleveland, Mississippi
- Arena: Walter Sillers Coliseum (capacity: 3,000)
- Conference: Gulf South Conference (GSC)
- Nickname: Lady Statesmen
- Colors: Forest green and white

NCAA Division I tournament champions
- 1989, 1990, 1992
Other NCAA Division I tournament results
Runner-up	1993
Final Four	1986, 1988, 1989, 1990, 1992, 1993, 1996, 2008, 2009
Elite Eight	1986, 1987, 1988, 1989, 1990, 1992, 1993, 1996, 1997, 2000, 2001, 2008, 2009
Sweet Sixteen	1986, 1987, 1988, 1989, 1990, 1992, 1993, 1996, 1997, 2000, 2001, 2006, 2007, 2008, 2009, 2010, 2011, 2013
Appearances	1986, 1987, 1988, 1989, 1990, 1991, 1992, 1993, 1995, 1996, 1997, 1998, 1999, 2000, 2001, 2002, 2004, 2006, 2007, 2008, 2009, 2010, 2011, 2012, 2013, 2014, 2016

AIAW tournament champions
- 1975, 1976, 1977
Other AIAW tournament results
Final Four	1975, 1976, 1977
Quarterfinals	1975, 1976, 1977
Second round	1975, 1976, 1977
Appearances	1975, 1976, 1977

Conference tournament champions
- 1986, 1987, 1988, 1989, 1995, 1996, 1997, 1999, 2000, 2001, 2002, 2006, 2007, 2008, 2009, 2016

Conference regular-season champions
- 1986, 1987, 1988, 1989, 1990, 1995, 1996, 1997, 1999, 2000, 2001, 2002, 2006, 2007, 2008, 2009, 2016

The Delta State Lady Statesmen basketball team is the women's basketball team that represents Delta State University in Cleveland, Mississippi, United States. The school's team currently competes in the Gulf South Conference.

== History ==
The Lady Statesmen began play in 1925. They joined the Gulf South Conference for women's basketball in 1986. The Lady Statesmen won three consecutive AIAW titles from 1974 to 1977, led by coach Margaret Wade, who was dubbed the "mother of modern women's college basketball," and star player Lusia Harris, who was drafted into the NBA her senior year. They have won the NCAA Division II women's basketball tournament three times, winning them in 1989, 1990, 1992 (all coached by Lloyd Clark), while finishing as runner up in 1993 to North Dakota State. They are the only Division II women's team with over 1,000 wins. They have made the NCAA Tournament 27 times, with a record of 57–25.

=== AIAW Championships ===
Association	Classification	Sport	Year	Score	Opponent
NCAA	AIAW	Basketball	1975	90–81	Immaculata
NCAA	AIAW	Basketball	1976	69–64	Immaculata
NCAA	AIAW	Basketball	1977	68–55	LSU

=== NCAA Division II Championships ===
Association	Division	Sport	Year	Score	Opponent
NCAA	Division II	Basketball	1989	88–58	Cal Poly-Pomona
NCAA	Division II	Basketball	1990	77–43	Bentley
NCAA	Division II	Basketball	1992	65–63	North Dakota State

== Postseason results ==
=== AIAW Division I ===
The Lady Statesmen made four appearances in the AIAW women's basketball tournament, with a combined record of 13–1.

Year	Round	Opponent	Result
1975	First Round; Quarterfinals; Semifinals; Championship Game	Federal City; Tennessee Tech; Southern Connecticut State; Immaculata	W, 77–75 (OT); W, 88–66; W, 71–68; W, 90–81
1976	First Round; Quarterfinals; Semifinals; Championship Game	Penn State; Baylor; Wayland Baptist; Immaculata	W, 88–46; W, 97–57; W, 61–60; W, 69–64
1977	First Round; Quarterfinals; Semifinals; Championship Game	Minnesota; Southern Connecticut State; Tennessee; LSU	W, 87–42; W, 75–49; W, 62–58; W, 68–55
1982	First Round; Quarterfinals	Vanderbilt; Villanova	W, 90–79; L, 72–87
