= 1982 NCAA Division II men's basketball tournament =

- Teams: 32
- Finals site: , Springfield, Massachusetts
- Champions: UDC Firebirds (1st title)
- Runner-up: Florida Southern Moccasins (2nd title game)
- Semifinalists: Kentucky Wesleyan Panthers (9th Final Four); Bakersfield State Roadrunners (1st Final Four)
- Winning coach: Wil Jones (1st title)
- MOP: Michael Britt (UDC)
- Attendance: 65,884

The 1982 NCAA Division II men's basketball tournament involved 32 schools playing in a single-elimination tournament to determine the national champion of men's NCAA Division II college basketball as a culmination of the 1981–82 NCAA Division II men's basketball season. It was won by the University of the District of Columbia and UDC's Michael Britt was the Most Outstanding Player.

This was the first NCAA D-II basketball tournament to contain the word "Men's" in its official title, as the NCAA held its first D-II women's championship in that season.

1982 NCAA Division II Men's sites - regionals (cyan) Quarterfinals (orange) Final Four (red)

== Regional participants ==
School	Outcome
Mount St. Mary's	Runner-up
UDC	Regional Champion
Virginia State	Third Place
Virginia Union	Fourth Place

School	Outcome
Bloomsburg	Runner-up
Cheyney	Regional Champion
Edinboro	Third Place
Monmouth	Fourth Place

School	Outcome
Lewis	Third Place
Eastern Montana	Fourth Place
Nebraska–Omaha	Runner-up
North Dakota	Regional Champion

School	Outcome
Alaska–Anchorage	Third Place
Cal Poly	Runner-up
Cal State Bakersfield	Regional Champion
San Francisco State	Fourth Place

School	Outcome
Central Missouri State	Third Place
SE Missouri State	Regional Champion
Tennessee–Martin	Runner-up
UCF	Fourth Place

School	Outcome
Florida Southern	Regional Champion
NW Missouri State	Fourth Place
St. Thomas (FL)	Third Place
West Alabama	Runner-up

School	Outcome
Bellarmine	Fourth Place
Central State	Runner-up
Kentucky Wesleyan	Regional Champion
Wright State	Third Place

School	Outcome
Sacred Heart	Regional Champion
Southern Connecticut	Runner-up
Springfield	Third Place
Stonehill	Fourth Place

*denotes tie

== Regionals ==
=== South Atlantic - Emmitsburg, Maryland ===
Location: Memorial Gym Host: Mount Saint Mary's College and Seminary

Regional semifinals Round of 32; March 5
UDC	68*
Virginia Union	64
Mount St. Mary's	90
Virginia State	86

Regional Final; Sweet 16; March 6
UDC	67
Mount St. Mary's	66

- Third Place - Virginia State 84, Virginia Union 82

=== East - Bloomsburg, Pennsylvania ===
Location: Nelson Field House Host: Bloomsburg State College

Regional semifinals Round of 32; March 4
Cheyney	66
Monmouth	53
Bloomsburg	53
Edinboro	50

Regional Final; Sweet 16; March 5
Cheyney	70
Bloomsburg	48

- Third Place - Edinboro 56, Monmouth 53

=== North Central - Grand Forks, North Dakota ===
Location: Hyslop Sports Center Host: University of North Dakota

Regional semifinals Round of 32; March 5
Nebraska–Omaha	78
Lewis	69
North Dakota	59
Eastern Montana	54

Regional Final; Sweet 16; March 6
Nebraska–Omaha	75
North Dakota	83

- Third Place - Lewis 76, Eastern Montana 70

=== West - Bakersfield, California ===
Location: unknown Host: California State University, Bakersfield

Regional semifinals Round of 32; March 5
Cal Poly	66
Alaska–Anchorage	60
Cal State Bakersfield	58
San Francisco State	50

Regional Final; Sweet 16; March 6
Cal Poly	55
Cal State Bakersfield	58

- Third Place - Alaska–Anchorage 89, San Francisco State 84

=== South Central - Warrensburg, Missouri ===
Location: CMSU Fieldhouse Host: Central Missouri State University

Regional semifinals Round of 32; March 4
SE Missouri State	60
UCF	55
Tennessee–Martin	46
Central Missouri State	42

Regional Final; Sweet 16; March 5
SE Missouri State	56
Tennessee–Martin	53

- Third Place - Central Missouri State 70, UCF 62

=== South - Lakeland, Florida ===
Location: Jenkins Field House Host: Florida Southern College

Regional semifinals Round of 32; March 4
West Alabama	75
St. Thomas (FL)	72
Florida Southern	80
NW Missouri State	74

Regional Final; Sweet 16; March 5
West Alabama	79
Florida Southern	86***

- Third Place - St. Thomas 89, NW Missouri State 83

=== Great Lakes - Owensboro, Kentucky ===
Location: Owensboro Sportscenter Host: Kentucky Wesleyan College

Regional semifinals Round of 32; March 6
Central State	63
Bellarmine	61
Kentucky Wesleyan	76*
Wright State	71

Regional Final; Sweet 16; March 7
Central State	65
Kentucky Wesleyan	66

- Third Place - Wright State 87, Bellarmine 86

=== New England - North Easton, Massachusetts ===
Location: Merkert Gymnasium Host: Stonehill College

Regional semifinals Round of 32; March 5
Sacred Heart	66
Springfield	61
Southern Connecticut	76
Stonehill	61

Regional Final; Sweet 16; March 6
Sacred Heart	78
Southern Connecticut	67

- Third Place - Springfield 73, Stonehill 72

*denotes each overtime played

== National Quarterfinals ==
Quarterfinal - Lakeland, FL; Elite Eight; March 12
SE Missouri State	73
Florida Southern	87

Quarterfinal - Owensboro, KY; Elite Eight; March 12
Kentucky Wesleyan	88
Sacred Heart	85

Quarterfinal - Cheyney, Pennsylvania; Elite Eight; March 12
UDC	72
Cheyney	69

Quarterfinal - Bakersfield, CA; Elite Eight; March 12
North Dakota	65
Cal State Bakersfield	67

== National Finals - Springfield, Massachusetts ==
Location: Springfield Civic Center Hosts: American International College and Springfield College

National semifinals Final Four; March 19
UDC	76
Cal State Bakersfield	71
Florida Southern	90**
Kentucky Wesleyan	89

National Championship; March 20
UDC	73
Florida Southern	63

- Third Place - Kentucky Wesleyan 77, Cal State Bakersfield 66

*denotes each overtime played

== All-tournament team ==
- Michael Britt (District of Columbia)
- John Ebeling (Florida Southern)
- Dwight Higgs (Kentucky Wesleyan)
- Earl Jones (District of Columbia)
- Wayne McDaniel (Cal State Bakersfield)

== See also ==
- 1982 NCAA Division I men's basketball tournament
- 1982 NCAA Division II women's basketball tournament
- 1982 NCAA Division III men's basketball tournament
- 1982 NAIA men's basketball tournament

== Sources ==
- 2010 NCAA Men's Basketball Championship Tournament Records and Statistics: Division II men's basketball Championship
- 1982 NCAA Division II men's basketball tournament jonfmorse.com
