= 1982 NCAA Division III women's basketball tournament =

- Teams: 16
- Finals site: , Elizabethtown, Pennsylvania
- Champions: Elizabethtown Blue Jays (1st title)
- Runner-up: UNC Greensboro Spartans (1st title game)
- Semifinalists: Clark Cougars (1st Final Four); Pomona-Pitzer Sagehens (1st Final Four)
- Winning coach: Yvonne Kauffman (1st title)
- MOP: Bev Hall (Elizabethtown)

The 1982 NCAA Division III women's basketball tournament was the inaugural tournament hosted by the NCAA to determine the national champion of Division III women's collegiate basketball in the United States. The 1982 AIAW Division III championship was a separate tournament.

Elizabethtown defeated UNC Greensboro in the championship game, 67–66 in overtime, to claim the Blue Jays' first Division III national title.

The championship rounds were hosted at Elizabethtown College in Elizabethtown, Pennsylvania.

== Bracket ==
=== First round ===
- Elizabethtown 86, Chris. Newport 59
- TCNJ 70, Widener 43
- Clark (MA) 67, UMass Boston 49
- Augustana (IL) 83, Grove City 62
- Scranton 69, Manhattanville 49
- Pomona-Pitzer 68, Millikin 66
- Susquehanna 63, Frostburg St. 60
- UNC Greensboro 71, St. Andrews 63

=== Second round ===
- Elizabethtown 74, TCNJ 58
- Clark (MA) 67, Augustana (IL) 56
- Pomona-Pitzer 62, Scranton 53 (OT)
- UNC Greensboro 74, Susquehanna 66

=== National finals ===
Final Four
Elizabethtown	71
Clark	51
UNC Greensboro	77
Pomona-Pitzer	66

National championship
Elizabethtown	67*
UNC Greensboro	66
Third Place
Clark	71
Pomona-Pitzer	72*

== All-tournament team ==
- Bev Hall, Elizabethtown (MOP)
- Page Lutz, Elizabethtown
- Carol Peschel, UNC Greensboro
- Carol Ferrin, Pomona-Pitzer
- Sherry Sydney, UNC Greensboro

== See also ==
- 1982 NCAA Division III men's basketball tournament
- 1982 NCAA Division I women's basketball tournament
- 1982 NCAA Division II women's basketball tournament
- 1982 AIAW National Division I Basketball Championship
- 1982 NAIA women's basketball tournament
