= Katy Digovich =

American chief executive (born 1984)

- Born: Catherine Florence Maria Regina Digovich; September 13, 1984 (age 41)
- Education: Princeton University
- Occupation: Social Entrepreneur
- Years active: 2008–present
- Known for: Founding Positive Innovation for the Next Generation
- Parent(s): Peter Digovich; Carolyn Digovich
- Awards: Global Laureate Fellowship

Catherine Florence Maria Regina Digovich (born September 13, 1984) is the founder and director of operations of the Botswana-based nonprofit Positive Innovation for the Next Generation (PING), which develops mobile health and education tools and helps mentor and teach local youth IT skills. She is also the founder and CEO of Develo, the for-profit arm of PING based in the Silicon Valley that develops mobile applications for emerging markets targeted at telecoms to help them diversify their revenue and provide value-added services to businesses and the end-user as well as the informal market sector.

== Biography ==
Digovich grew up in Palo Alto, California, and graduated from Princeton University in 2008. She played on the Princeton Tigers women's basketball team from 2003 to 2005 and 2006 to 2008 at forward. Digovich took a gap year from Princeton in 2005–06 and left the basketball team for the last time in January 2008. In four years, she played 67 games and averaged 7.1 points and 4.9 rebounds.

=== Princeton statistics ===
Ratios
Year	Team	GP	FG%	3P%	FT%	RBG	APG	BPG	SPG	PPG
2003-04	Princeton	27	35.3%	35.2%	63.3%	6.444	2.222	0.741	0.852	10.444
2004-05	Princeton	20	34.7%	23.3%	81.3%	5.350	1.250	0.650	1.250	8.700
2005-06	Princeton	Took a year off								
2006-07	Princeton	17	17.1%	14.3%	33.3%	2.706	0.353	0.353	0.294	1.000
2007-08	Princeton	4	33.3%	-	-	1.000	-	0.250	0.250	0.500
Career		68	33.5%	28.6%	68.8%	4.868	1.338	0.588	0.794	6.985

Totals
Year	Team	GP	FG	FGA	3P	3PA	FT	FTA	REB	A	BK	ST	PTS
2003-04	Princeton	27	97	275	31	88	57	90	174	60	20	23	282
2004-05	Princeton	20	59	170	17	73	39	48	107	25	13	25	174
2005-06	Princeton	Took a year off											
2006-07	Princeton	17	7	41	2	14	1	3	46	6	6	5	17
2007-08	Princeton	4	1	3	0	0	0	0	4	0	1	1	2
Career		68	164	489	50	175	97	141	331	91	40	54	475

== Awards and accolades ==
In October 2013, Digovich received the Global Laureate Fellowship for her involvement with Positive Innovation for the Next Generation. She traveled to São Paulo, Brazil to receive the prestigious award only received by twenty young entrepreneurs worldwide annually.
