= Jackie White =

American basketball player

Personal information
- Born: c.1962 Little Rock, Arkansas, U.S
- Listed height: 5 ft 10 in (1.78 m)

Career information
- High school: San Joaquin Memorial (Fresno, California)
- College: LSU (1980–1981); Cal Poly Pomona (1981–1983); Cal State Long Beach (1984–1985)
- Position: Guard

Career highlights
- NCAA Division II champion (1982); WBCA Division II Player of the Year (1983); NCAA Division II Tournament MVP (1982); CCAA Player of the Year (1983); 2× First team All-CCAA (1982, 1983); First-team Parade All-American (1980)

Jackie White is an American former basketball player. She played college basketball for Louisiana State University (1980–1981), Cal Poly Pomona (1981–1983) and Cal State Long Beach (1984–1985). She later became the second woman ever to play for the Harlem Globetrotters.

== High school ==
White attended San Joaquin Memorial High School in Fresno, California. She was named a First-team Parade All-American in 1980.

== College career ==
White joined Louisiana State University in 1980 where she averaged 13.1 points and team leading 4.5 assists. After becoming academically ineligible for the following season due to poor grades, she joined Cal Poly Pomona in the NCAA Division II. In NCAA Division II championship and was named the NCAA Division II Tournament MVP. In 1983, she was named the WBCA Division II Player of the Year and to her second consecutive NCAA Division II All-Tournament team but Cal Poly failed to repeat as champions.

Wanting to finish her career in Division I, she transferred to Cal State Long Beach and redshirted the 1983–1984 season. During her senior season, she averaged 15.2 points and 2.8 assists.

== Later life ==
After her college career, she worked in the Chino state youth correctional facility for 28 years until her retirement in 2013.
