= Clayton Sato =

Guamanian footballer (born 1999)

Personal information
- Full name: Clayton Akira Sato
- Date of birth: July 20, 1999 (age 27)
- Place of birth: Honolulu, Hawaii, United States
- Height: 1.77 m (5 ft 10 in)
- Position: Forward

College career
Years	Team	Apps	(Gls)
2017–2019	San Francisco State Gators	31	(5)

International career^{‡}
2021–	Guam	3	(0)
- ‡ National team caps and goals as of June 11, 2021

Clayton Akira Sato (born July 20, 1999) is a Guamanian footballer who plays as a forward for the Guam national football team.

== Career ==
=== College ===
In January 2017, Sato committed to play at San Francisco State University. In his freshman season, Sato made just five appearances, none of which were starts, scoring once. He played a much more prominent role during his sophomore season, scoring four goals in 17 appearances, 10 of which were starts.

=== International ===
In May 2021, Sato was called up to the Guam national football team. He made his senior international debut on May 30, 2021, in a 7-0 World Cup qualifying defeat to China.

== Career statistics ==
=== International ===
As of matches played June 11, 2021.

National team	Year	Apps	Goals
Guam	2021	3	0
Total		3	0
