= 1979–80 AIAW Division I women's basketball rankings =

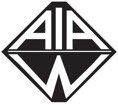
- Season: 1979–80
- AIAW Tournament: 1980
- Preseason No. 1: Louisiana Tech
- AIAW Tournament Champions: Louisiana Tech
AIAW Division I women's basketball rankings


A single human poll represents the 1979–80 AIAW Division I women's basketball rankings, the AP Poll, in addition to various publications' preseason polls.

The AP poll was initially a poll of coaches conducted via telephone, where coaches identified top teams and a list of the Top 20 team was produced. The contributors continued to be coaches until 1994, when the AP took over administration of the poll from Mel Greenberg, and switched to a panel of writers. The AP poll is currently a poll of sportswriters. The AP conducts polls weekly through the end of the regular season and conference play.

== Legend ==
–	Not ranked
(#)	Ranking

== AP Poll ==
Team	25-Nov	4-Dec	11-Dec	18-Dec	25-Dec	1-Jan	8-Jan	15-Jan	22-Jan	29-Jan	5-Feb	12-Feb	19-Feb	24-Feb	2-Mar	9-Mar	18-Mar
Old Dominion	1	1	1	1	3	3	3	2	2	T1	1	1	1	1	1	1	1
Tennessee	4	4	3	3	5	5	5	5	4	6	5	4	4	4	3	2	2
Louisiana Tech	2	2	4	4	1	1	1	1	1	3	3	3	3	2	2	4	3
South Carolina	16	13	15	13	12	11	10	11	8	7	6	5	5	7	7	6	4
Stephen F. Austin	3	3	2	2	2	2	2	4	5	4	4	6	6	5	5	3	5
Maryland	11	10	10	9	7	7	12	15	15	14	14	14	14	14	13	9	6
Texas	7	6	5	5	4	4	4	3	3	T1	2	2	2	3	4	5	7
Rutgers	6	7	7	7	9	9	7	8	7	8	8	8	7	6	6	8	8
Long Beach St.	9	9	8	8	6	6	6	6	6	5	7	7	9	9	9	7	9
North Carolina St.	5	5	6	6	8	8	8	7	10	10	9	9	8	8	8	10	10
Kansas	14	12	13	12	11	12	11	9	9	9	10	10	10	10	15	12	11
Cheyney	8	8	9	10	10	10	9	10	11	11	12	13	13	11	10	11	12
Kansas St.	–	–	18	18	15	15	14	13	14	13	11	11	11	12	12	14	13
Kentucky	–	–	–	–	18	18	–	18	17	17	15	15	15	13	11	13	14
Northwestern	18	17	16	17	–	–	–	–	–	–	–	20	18	18	17	16	15
Mercer	–	–	–	20	19	19	17	17	18	20	–	–	–	–	–	T20	16
Oregon	20	–	–	–	–	–	–	–	–	–	–	–	–	–	–	T20	17
Central Mo.	–	–	–	–	–	–	–	–	–	–	–	–	–	–	19	18	18
San Francisco	–	–	–	–	–	–	20	19	19	18	13	12	12	15	14	15	19
BYU	–	–	–	–	–	–	–	–	–	–	–	–	–	–	–	–	20
Clemson	–	–	–	–	–	–	18	16	16	16	16	16	16	16	16	–	–
Delta St.	–	16	14	14	16	16	19	–	–	–	–	–	–	–	–	–	–
Detroit	–	18	17	16	14	13	13	12	13	12	19	19	19	19	20	19	–
LSU	–	20	–	–	–	–	–	–	–	–	–	–	–	–	–	–	–
Mississippi Col.	–	–	–	–	20	20	–	–	–	–	–	–	–	–	–	–	–
Ole Miss	19	19	–	–	–	–	–	–	–	–	–	–	–	–	–	–	–
Penn St.	12	–	–	–	–	–	–	–	–	–	–	–	–	–	–	–	–
Pittsburgh	–	–	T20	19	–	–	–	–	–	–	–	–	–	–	–	–	–
Queens (NY)	–	–	T20	–	–	–	–	–	–	–	20	–	–	–	–	–	–
Southern California	–	–	–	–	–	–	–	–	–	–	–	–	–	–	–	17	–
Tennessee Tech	13	14	19	–	–	–	–	–	–	–	–	–	20	20	–	–	–
UCLA	10	11	11	11	13	14	16	20	T20	–	–	–	–	–	–	–	–
UNLV	17	15	12	15	17	17	15	14	12	15	17	18	17	17	18	–	–
Valdosta St.	15	–	–	–	–	–	–	–	–	–	–	–	–	–	–	–	–
Villanova	–	–	–	–	–	–	–	–	T20	19	18	17	–	–	–	–	–
