= Mike Gibson (basketball) =

American basketball player (born 1960)

Personal information
- Born: October 27, 1960 (age 66) Williamsburg County, South Carolina, U.S.
- Listed height: 6 ft 11 in (2.11 m)
- Listed weight: 205 lb (93 kg)

Career information
- High school: Hemingway (Hemingway, South Carolina)
- College: USC Spartanburg (1978–1982)
- NBA draft: 1982: 2nd round, 44th overall pick
- Drafted by: Washington Bullets
- Playing career: 1982–1994
- Position: Power forward
- Number: 30, 35

Career history
- 1982–1983: Maine Lumberjacks
- 1983: Rochester Zeniths
- 1983–1984: Washington Bullets
- 1984–1985: Auxilium Torino
- 1985–1986: Detroit Pistons
- 1986: Detroit Spirits
- 1986: Jacksonville Jets
- 1987: Mississippi Jets
- 1987–1988: Quad City Thunder
- 1988–1989: Pensacola Tornados
- 1989: Aurora Desio
- 1989–1990: OAR Ferrol
- 1990: Hapoel Tel Aviv
- 1991–1994: Hapoel Galil Elyon

Career highlights
- NAIA tournament MVP (1982)
- Stats at NBA.com
- Stats at Basketball Reference

Michael Jerome Gibson (born October 27, 1960) is a retired professional basketball power forward who played two seasons in the National Basketball Association (NBA) as a member of the Washington Bullets (1983–84) and the Detroit Pistons (1985–86). Born in Williamsburg County, South Carolina, he was drafted out of the University of South Carolina Spartanburg by the Bullets during the second round of the 1982 NBA draft. Until the addition of Torrey Craig for the Denver Nuggets in 2017 via two-way contract, he was the only player in Upstate's history to ever play in the NBA. In 1993 he won with Hapoel Galil-Elion a historical championship in Israel; it was the first time after 23 years that another team other than Maccabi Tel Aviv won.

== Career statistics ==
Legend
GP	Games played	GS	Games started	MPG	Minutes per game
FG%	Field goal percentage	3P%	3-point field goal percentage	FT%	Free throw percentage
RPG	Rebounds per game	APG	Assists per game	SPG	Steals per game
BPG	Blocks per game	PPG	Points per game	**Bold**	Career high

=== NBA ===
==== Regular season ====
Year	Team	GP	GS	MPG	FG%	3P%	FT%	RPG	APG	SPG	BPG	PPG
1983–84	Washington	**32**	0	7.2	.382	–	.647	**2.1**	**.3**	.2	**.2**	**1.7**
1985–86	Detroit	**32**	0	5.0	**.392**	–	**.727**	1.3	.2	**.3**	.1	1.5
Career		64	0	6.1	.387	–	.679	1.7	.2	.2	.2	1.6
