= Oakland Golden Grizzlies women's basketball =

Oakland Golden Grizzlies
2025–26 Oakland Golden Grizzlies women's basketball team
- University: Oakland University
- Head coach: Keisha Newell (1st season)
- Location: Auburn Hills, Michigan
- Arena: OU Credit Union O'rena (capacity: 4,005)
- NCAA division: Division I
- Conference: Horizon League
- Nickname: Golden Grizzlies
- Colors: Black and gold

NCAA Division I tournament appearances
- 2002, 2006

NCAA Division II tournament Final Four
- 1982, 1990

NCAA Division II tournament Elite Eight
- 1982, 1990, 1995

NCAA Division II tournament Sweet Sixteen
- 1982, 1983, 1989, 1990, 1995

NCAA Division II tournament appearances
- 1982, 1983, 1989, 1990, 1994, 1995, 1996, 1997

Conference tournament champions
- 2002, 2006

Conference regular-season champions
- 2000, 2001, 2007

Uniforms
Home	Away

The Oakland Golden Grizzlies women's basketball team represents Oakland University in Auburn Hills, Michigan, United States. The school's team competes in the Horizon League and plays their home games at the OU Credit Union O'rena.

== History ==
The Golden Grizzlies, then called the Pioneers, began play in 1974. As of the end of the 2020–21 season, they have an all-time record of 818–517. During their time in Division II (playing in the GLIAC), they qualified for the respective Tournament in 1982, 1983, 1989, 1990, 1994, 1995, 1996, and 1997. They finished as regular season champion in the GLIAC in 1982, 1983, 1989, 1990, 1994, with a Division title in 1997.

In 1998, the team joined the Mid-Continent Conference (now known as the Summit League) in Division I and changed their name to the Golden Grizzlies. They have qualified for the NCAA tournament twice, in 2002 and 2006, both times after winning the Summit League tournament. Both times they lost in the first round, losing 63–38 to Vanderbilt and 68–45 to Ohio State, respectively.

In 2013, the Golden Grizzlies left the Summit League and joined the Horizon League.

== Postseason results ==
The Golden Grizzlies, then known as the Pioneers, had a 10–10 record in eight NCAA Tournament appearances at the Division II level.

=== NCAA Division II tournament results ===
Year	Round	Opponent	Result
1982	First round Second round Semifinals; Third-place game	North Kentucky; Chapman; Tuskgee; Mount St. Mary's	W, 77–75; W, 73–61; L, 82–88; L, 62–73
1983	Regional Final	Dayton	L, 72–73
1989	First round Regional Finals	Northern Kentucky; St. Joseph's (IN)	W, 95–93 (OT); L, 59–80
1990	First round Regional Finals; Elite Eight; Semifinals; Third-place game	IPFW; St. Joseph's (IN); Central Missouri State; Bentley; Cal Poly Pomona	W, 87–83; W, 89–86; W, 66–61; L, 68–72; L, 68–87
1994	First round	Lake Superior State	L, 84–98
1995	First round Regional semifinals Regional Finals; Elite Eight	St. Joseph's (IN); Southern Indiana; Michigan Tech; North Dakota State	W, 78–86; W, 88–69; W, 60–56; L, 61–87
1996	First round	Southern Indiana	L, 83–84
1997	First round Regional semifinals	Saginaw Valley; Northern Michigan	W, 83–72; L, 56–66

=== NCAA Division I Tournament results ===
Year	Seed	Round	Opponent	Result
2002	#16	First round	#1 Vanderbilt	L 38-63
2006	#16	First round	#1 Ohio State	L 45-68
