= Stephen F. Austin Ladyjacks basketball =

| 2025–26 Stephen F. Austin Ladyjacks basketball team |
- University: Stephen F. Austin State University
- Head coach: Leonard Bishop (3rd season)
- Location: Nacogdoches, Texas
- Arena: William R. Johnson Coliseum (capacity: 7,203)
- Conference: Southland
- Nickname: Ladyjacks
- Colors: Purple and white

NCAA Division I tournament Sweet Sixteen
- 1989, 1990, 1992, 1993, 1996

NCAA Division I tournament appearances
- 1982, 1983, 1988, 1989, 1990, 1991, 1992, 1993, 1994, 1995, 1996, 1997, 1998, 1999, 2000, 2001, 2002, 2006, 2021, 2022, 2025, 2026

AIAW tournament quarterfinals
- 1975, 1978, 1980
Other AIAW tournament results
| Second round | 1973, 1974, 1975, 1978, 1980, 1981 |
| Appearances | 1973, 1974, 1975, 1978, 1980, 1981 |

Conference tournament champions
- 1988, 1989, 1990, 1991, 1992, 1993, 1994, 1995, 1996, 1998, 1999, 2000, 2001, 2002, 2006, 2021, 2022, 2025, 2026

Conference regular-season champions
- 1988, 1989, 1990, 1991, 1992, 1993, 1994, 1996, 1997, 1998, 2000, 2001, 2002, 2006, 2010 T, 2014 T, 2015, 2020, 2021, 2022

Uniforms
| Home | Away |

The Stephen F. Austin Ladyjacks basketball team is the women's basketball team that represents Stephen F. Austin State University (SFA) in Nacogdoches, Texas. SFA rejoined the Southland Conference on July 1, 2024 after playing the previous 3 seasons in the WAC.

The women's basketball team was part of the growth in popularity of women's intercollegiate basketball in the 1970s. Women's basketball at the college level was organized under the auspices of the AIAW in the early 1970s, at a time when competitive power was distributed among smaller colleges, such as Immaculata, Delta State, West Chester State and Wayland Baptist. The Ladyjacks were a consistent presence in the Top 20 rankings during the 1970s.

== Current roster ==
2024–25 Stephen F. Austin Ladyjacks women's basketball team
Players
Coaches

| Pos. | # | Name | Height | Year | Previous school | Hometown |
|---|---|---|---|---|---|---|
| G | 0 | Hope LeMelle | 5 ft 7 in (1.7 m) | GS | Liberty | Dallas, Texas |
| G | 1 | Myka Perry | 6 ft 1 in (1.85 m) | So | University of Florida | Norman, Oklahoma |
| G | 2 | Aziyah Farrier | 6 ft 1 in (1.85 m) | Fr | Frisco Liberty High School | Frisco, Texas |
| G | 3 | Avery VanSickle | 5 ft 10 in (1.78 m) | Sr | Regis Jesuit High School | Denver, Colorado |
| G | 4 | Ashlyn Traylor-Walker | 5 ft 8 in (1.73 m) | Sr | Radford | Franklin, Indiana |
| G | 5 | Key Roseby | 6 ft 0 in (1.83 m) | So | Frisco Liberty High School | Frisco, Texas |
| G | 7 | Lydia Cajuste | 6 ft 0 in (1.83 m) | RS Fr | John Paul II High School | Dallas, Texas |
| G | 9 | Anika Hylaand | 5 ft 6 in (1.68 m) | Fr | Tauranga Girls College | Tauranga, New Zealand |
| G | 10 | Harmaine Dominguez | 5 ft 6 in (1.68 m) | Sr | Adams State | Las Cruces, New Mexico |
| G | 12 | Kayinn Kemp | 5 ft 9 in (1.75 m) | Fr | Duncanville High School | Duncanville, Texas |
| C | 13 | Ituau Tuisaula | 6 ft 1 in (1.85 m) | Sr | Peninsula College | Soldotna, Alaska |
| G | 15 | Mimi Gatewood | 5 ft 6 in (1.68 m) | Jr | Kansas State | DeSoto, Texas |
| F | 20 | Cha Gardner | 6 ft 3 in (1.91 m) | So | Newark Valley High School | Newark Valley, New York |
| C | 24 | Talia Vann | 6 ft 3 in (1.91 m) | Fr | Bethany High School | Oklahoma City, Oklahoma |

Head coach

- Leonard Bishop (East Texas A&M)

Assistant coach(es)

- Steve Yang (Missouri State)
- Dr. Jeanne-Marie Wilson (North Central (MN))
- Lex Murphy (Angelo State)

Legend

- (C) Team captain
- (S) Suspended
- (I) Ineligible
- (W) Walk-on
- Injured
- Current redshirt

Roster
Last update: November 7, 2025

== Postseason appearances ==
=== NCAA tournament ===
The Ladyjacks have appeared in the NCAA Division I women's basketball tournament 22 times. Their combined record is 10–22.

| Year | Seed | Round | Opponent | Result |
|---|---|---|---|---|
| 1982 | #5 | First Round | Kansas State | L 75–78 |
| 1983 | #7 | First Round | Long Beach State | L 61–88 |
| 1988 | #8 | First round second round | #9 LSU #1 Iowa | W 84–62; L 65–83 |
| 1989 | #4 | Second round Sweet Sixteen | #5 Washington #1 Maryland | W 73–63; L 54–89 |
| 1990 | #3 | Second round Sweet Sixteen | #6 Long Beach State #7 Arkansas | W 78–62; L 74–98 |
| 1991 | #8 | First round second round | #9 Ole Miss #1 Virginia | W 73–62; L 72–74 |
| 1992 | #2 | Second round Sweet Sixteen | #7 Creighton #3 USC | W 75–74; L 57–61 |
| 1993 | #4 | Second round Sweet Sixteen | #5 Clemson #1 Vanderbilt | W 89–78; L 56–59 |
| 1994 | #8 | First round | #9 Kansas | L 62–72 |
| 1995 | #11 | First round | #6 Seton Hall | L 63–73 |
| 1996 | #11 | First round second round Sweet Sixteen | #6 Oregon State #3 Clemson #2 Georgia | W 67–65; W 93–88; L 64–78 |
| 1997 | #7 | First round second round | #10 Toledo #2 Colorado | W 79–66; L 74–75 |
| 1998 | #9 | First round | #8 Western Kentucky | L 76–88 |
| 1999 | #15 | First round | #2 Texas Tech | L 54–80 |
| 2000 | #11 | First round second round | #6 Xavier #3 LSU | W 73–72; L 45–57 |
| 2001 | #13 | First round | #4 Rutgers | L 43–80 |
| 2002 | #13 | First round | #4 Texas Tech | L 63–84 |
| 2006 | #13 | First round | #4 Arizona State | L 61–80 |
| 2021 | #12 | First round | #5 Georgia Tech | L 52–54 (OT) |
| 2022 | #12 | First round | #5 North Carolina | L 66–79 |
| 2025 | #14 | First round | #3 Notre Dame | L 54–106 |
| 2026 | #16 | First four | #16 Missouri State | L 75–85 |

=== WNIT ===
The Ladyjacks have appeared in five Women's National Invitation Tournaments (WNIT). Their combined record is 1–5.

| Year | Seed | Round | Opponent | Result |
|---|---|---|---|---|
| 2007 | -- | First round | Southern Illinois | L 50–58 |
| 2010 | -- | First round | Creighton | L 65–76 |
| 2018 | -- | First round | George Mason | L 75–82 |
| 2019 | -- | First round | UT Arlington | L 54–60 |
| 2023 | -- | First round second round | Texas State; Arkansas | W 89–79; L 60–37 |

=== WBI ===
The Ladyjacks have appeared in two Women's Basketball Invitationals (WBI). Their combined record is 0–2.

| Year | Seed | Round | Opponent | Result |
|---|---|---|---|---|
| 2012 | -- | First round | Northern Iowa | L 67–83 |
| 2017 | -- | First round | Texas-Rio Grande Valley | L 54-62 |

=== AIAW Division I ===
The Ladyjacks made six appearances in the AIAW National Division I basketball tournament, with a combined record of 6–8.

| Year | Round | Opponent | Result |
|---|---|---|---|
| 1973 | First round quarterfinals | Utah State; Queens (NY) | W 58–43; L 56–59 (OT) |
| 1974 | First round quarterfinals consolation second round | Illinois State; William Penn; Tennessee Tech | W 51–48; L 46–52; L 43–63 |
| 1975 | First round consolation first round consolation second round | Southern Connecticut; West Georgia; Wayland Baptist | L 51–68; W 82–62; L 46–50 |
| 1978 | First round quarterfinals | Washington; UCLA | W 96–55; L 60–86 |
| 1980 | Second round quarterfinals | Oregon; South Carolina | W 76–53; L 56–63 |
| 1981 | First round second round | Northwestern; Old Dominion | W 88–67; L 54–60 |
