= Tennessee Tech Golden Eagles women's basketball =

2026–27 Tennessee Tech Golden Eagles women's basketball team
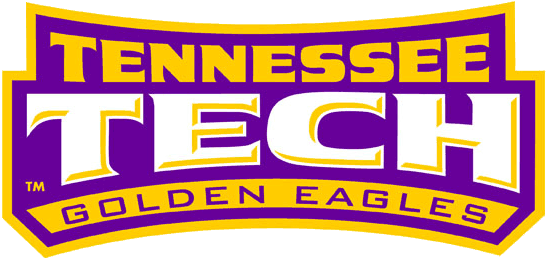
- University: Tennessee Technological University
- Head coach: Kim Rosamond (11th season)
- Location: Cookeville, Tennessee
- Arena: Eblen Center (capacity: 9,282)
- Conference: SoCon
- Nickname: Golden Eagles
- Colors: Purple and gold

NCAA Division I tournament second round
- 1987, 1989, 1990

NCAA Division I tournament appearances
- 1982, 1985, 1987, 1989, 1990, 1991, 1992, 1993, 1999, 2000, 2023, 2025

AIAW tournament quarterfinals
- 1974, 1976, 1977
Other AIAW tournament results
Second round	1972, 1974, 1975, 1976, 1977
Appearances	1972, 1974, 1975, 1976, 1977

Conference tournament champions
- 1982, 1987, 1989, 1990, 1991, 1992, 1993, 1999, 2000, 2023, 2025

Conference regular-season champions
- 1978, 1979, 1981, 1982, 1987, 1990, 1991, 1992, 1993, 1995, 1998, 1999, 2000, 2001, 2002, 2006, 2011, 2013, 2025

The Tennessee Tech Golden Eagles women's basketball team is the women's basketball team that is representing Tennessee Technological University located in Cookeville, Tennessee, United States. The school's team currently competes in the Ohio Valley Conference.

== History ==
As of the end of the 2015-16 season, the Golden Eagles have a 901-503 all-time record. They reached the Second Round of the NCAA Tournament in 1987, 1989, 1990.

== Postseason results ==
=== NCAA Division I ===
Tennessee Tech has reached the NCAA Division I women's basketball tournament eight times. They have a record of 4–12.

Year	Seed	Round	Opponent	Result
1982	#8	First Round	#1 Louisiana Tech	L 53-114
1985	#7	First Round	#2 Georgia	L 74-91
1987	#7	First Round; Second Round	#10 Southern Miss #2 Tennessee	W 78-66; L 59-95
1989	#11	First Round; Second Round	#6 South Carolina #3 Iowa	W 77-73; L 75-77
1990	#7	First Round; Second Round	#10 Richmond #2 Auburn	W 77-59; L 54-73
1991	#9	First Round	#8 Missouri State	L 64-94
1992	#12	First Round	#5 Alabama	L 87-100
1993	#10	First Round	#7 Old Dominion	L 60-77
1999	#15	First Round	#2 Old Dominion	L 48-74
2000	#14	First Round	#3 Texas Tech	L 54-83
2023	#16	First Four; First Round	#16 Monmouth #1 Indiana	W 79-69; L 47-77
2025	#16	First Round	#1 South Carolina	L 48-108

=== AIAW Division I ===
The Golden Eagles made five appearances in the AIAW National Division I basketball tournament, with a combined record of 10–9.

Year	Round	Opponent	Result
1972	First Round; Consolation First Round	Cal State Fullerton; Queens (NY)	L, 56–65; L, 63–64
1974	First Round; Consolation First Round; Consolation Second Round; Consolation Third Round; Fifth Place Game	Mississippi College; Fresno State; Stephen F. Austin; Indiana; Wayland Baptist	L, 63–65; W, 53–41; W, 53–41; W, 53–41; L, 39–54
1975	First Round; Quarterfinals; Consolation Second Round	Utah State; Delta State; William Penn	W, 91–45; L, 66–88; L, 65–67 (OT)
1976	First Round; Consolation First Round; Consolation Second Round; Consolation Third Round; Fifth Place Game	William Penn; Wisconsin–La Crosse; Baylor; Mississippi College; Montclair State	L, 70–78; W, 116–78; W, 89–78; W, 111–93; W, 94–88
1977	First Round; Consolation First Round; Consolation Second Round; Consolation Third Round	Immaculata; Cal State Fullerton; Kansas State; Southern Connecticut	L, 73–83; W, 70–67; W, 68–58; L, 72–85
