= 1980 AIAW National Division III Basketball Championship =

1980 AIAW National Small College Basketball Championship
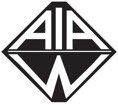

Tournament information
- Administrator: Association for Intercollegiate Athletics for Women
- Venue(s): Spokane, Washington
- Participants: 24

Final positions
- Champions: Worcester State (1st title)
- Runner-up: Wisconsin–La Crosse

Tournament statistics
- Matches played: 24

The 1980 AIAW National Division III Basketball Championship was the inaugural tournament hosted by the Association for Intercollegiate Athletics for Women to determine the national champion of collegiate basketball among its Division III members in the United States.

The tournament was held in Spokane, Washington.

Worcester State defeated Wisconsin–La Crosse in the championship game, 76–73, to capture the Lancers' first AIAW Division III national title.

== Format ==
Twenty-four teams participated in a single-elimination tournament, with eight teams receiving byes into the second round.

The tournament also included a third-place game for the two teams that lost in the semifinal games.

== Tournament bracket ==
First round
Adrian	73
Elizabethtown	55
Pitt Johnstown	79
Bridgewater (VA)	70
Eastern Connecticut	69
Christopher Newport	60
Juniata	77
Columbia (SC)	69
Notre Dame de Namur	57
Pacific Lutheran	48
Minnesota–Morris	71
Linfield	46
Tarleton State	69
Spring Arbor	68
Biola	84
Willamette	51

Second round
Worcester State	69
Adrian	59
Lee (TN)	89
Pitt Johnstown	78
Scranton	78
Eastern Connecticut	71
McMurry	66
Juniata	68
Wisconsin–La Crosse	80
Notre Dame de Namur	57
San Francisco State	74
Minnesota–Morris	58
Mount Mercy	90
Tarleton State	81
Western Oregon	60
Biola	75

Quarterfinals
Worcester State	72
Lee (TN)	59
Scranton	76
Juniata	36
Wisconsin–La Crosse	75
San Francisco State	60
Mount Mercy	81
Biola	77

Semifinals
Worcester State	81
Scranton	60
Wisconsin–La Crosse	66
Mount Mercy	63

National championship
Worcester State	76
Wisconsin–La Crosse	73
Third place final
Scranton	78
Mount Mercy	68

== See also ==
- 1980 AIAW National Division I Basketball Championship
- 1980 AIAW National Division II Basketball Championship
