= 1972 AIAW National Basketball Championship =

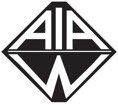

Tournament information
- Dates: March 16, 1972–March 19, 1972
- Administrator: Association for Intercollegiate Athletics for Women
- Host(s): Illinois State University
- Venue(s): Normal, Illinois
- Participants: 16

Final positions
- Champions: Immaculata (1st title)
- Runner-up: West Chester State

Tournament statistics
- Matches played: 23

The 1972 AIAW women's basketball tournament was held on March 16–19, 1972. The host site was Illinois State University in Normal, Illinois.

Sixteen teams participated. Immaculata College (now known as Immaculata University), coached by Hall-of-Famer Cathy Rush, was crowned national champion at the conclusion of the tournament.

== Tournament bracket ==
=== Main bracket ===
First round* March 16, 1972
Immaculata	60
South Dakota State	47
Indiana	49
Southern Conn. State	30
Mississippi St. College for Women	64
Illinois State	47
Tennessee-Martin	53
Long Beach State	43
West Chester State	79
Utah State	45
Northern Illinois	50
Washington State	43
Cal State Fullerton	65
Tennessee Tech	56
Phillips	54
Queens College	43

Quarterfinals; March 17, 1972
Immaculata	49
Indiana	46
Mississippi St. College for Women	43
Tennessee-Martin	25
West Chester State	66
Northern Illinois	54
Cal State Fullerton	53
Phillips	38

Semifinals; March 18, 1972
Immaculata	46
Mississippi St. College for Women	43
West Chester State	62
Cal State Fullerton	57

Final; March 19, 1972
Immaculata	52
West Chester State	48
Third place
Mississippi St. College	42
Cal State Fullerton	52

*Losers in the first round continued in the consolation bracket (below)

=== Consolation bracket ===
First round March 18, 1972
South Dakota St.	34
S. Connecticut St.	72
Illinois State	41
Long Beach State	59
Utah State	40
Washington State	37
Tennessee Tech	63
Queens College	64

Second round March 18, 1972
S. Connecticut St.	42
Long Beach State	48
Utah State	57
Queens College	65

Fifth place game March 19, 1972
Long Beach State	51
Queens College	55
