= 1981 AIAW National Division II Basketball Championship =

1981 women's basketball tournament

1981 AIAW National Small College Basketball Championship
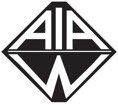

Tournament information
- Administrator: Association for Intercollegiate Athletics for Women
- Host(s): University of Dayton
- Venue(s): Dayton, Ohio
- Participants: 16

Final positions
- Champions: William Penn (1st title)
- Runner-up: College of Charleston

Tournament statistics
- Matches played: 16

The 1981 AIAW National Division II Basketball Championship was the second annual tournament hosted by the Association for Intercollegiate Athletics for Women to determine the national champion of collegiate basketball among its Division II members in the United States.

The tournament was held at the University of Dayton in Dayton, Ohio.

William Penn defeated College of Charleston in the championship game, 64–51, to capture the Statesmen's first AIAW Division II national title.

== Format ==
Sixteen teams participated in a single-elimination tournament, a decrease in eight teams from the previous year's championship.

The tournament also included a third-place game for the two teams that lost in the semifinal games.

== Tournament bracket ==
First round
Lenoir-Rhyne	83
Biola	69
Abilene Christian	92
Springfield	75
William Penn	63
Idaho	43
Eastern Illinois	77
Colorado College	69
Louisiana College	76
Morgan State	61
Cal Poly Pomona	83
William Carey	65
College of Charleston	70
SW Missouri State	55
Tuskegee	83
Dayton	69

Quarterfinals
Lenoir-Rhyne	88
Abilene Christian	75
William Penn	73
Eastern Illinois	53
Louisiana College	61
Cal Poly Pomona	81
College of Charleston	85
Tuskegee	68

Semifinals
Lenoir-Rhyne	46
William Penn	71
Cal Poly Pomona	84
College of Charleston	102

National championship
William Penn	64
College of Charleston	51
Third place final
Lenoir-Rhyne	65
Cal Poly Pomona	85

== See also ==
- 1981 AIAW National Division I Basketball Championship
- 1981 AIAW National Division III Basketball Championship
- 1981 NAIA women's basketball tournament
