= Omaha Mavericks women's basketball =

Women's college basketball team

Omaha Mavericks
2025–26 Omaha Mavericks women's basketball team
- University: University of Nebraska Omaha
- First season: 1970–71
- Head coach: Jamie Carey (1st season)
- Location: Omaha, Nebraska
- Arena: Baxter Arena (capacity: 7,500)
- Conference: Summit League
- Nickname: Mavericks
- Colors: Crimson and black
- All-time record: 595–572 (.510)

NCAA Division I tournament appearances
- Division II; 1982, 1987, 1992

AIAW tournament appearances
- Division II; 1980

The Omaha Mavericks women's basketball team, also called the Nebraska–Omaha Mavericks, (Note: Although the school has completed the rebranding of its athletic program as "Omaha", and both The Summit League and National Collegiate Hockey Conference now follow this usage, national media such as ESPN usually use the hyphenated "Nebraska-Omaha".) represents the University of Nebraska Omaha in Omaha, Nebraska, United States. The Mavericks compete in The Summit League and play in the new on-campus Baxter Arena, built prior to the 2015–16 season. The Mavericks are now eligible for the NCAA tournament, NIT, or Summit League Tournament, having completed the school's four-year transition from Division II to Division I, which began in the 2011–12 season.

During the 2021 Summit League women's basketball tournament the Mavericks, seeded eighth, beat number one seed and nationally ranked 22nd, South Dakota State Jackrabbits 52–40. In the Semifinals they beat Western Illinois 69–55 to reach the Summit League Championship for the first time in school history. The Mavericks would end up losing to the South Dakota Coyotes and the Coyotes would earn the spot in the NCAA Tournament.

== Postseason ==
=== NCAA Division II ===
The Mavericks made three appearances in the NCAA Division II women's basketball tournament. They had a combined record of 0–3.

Year	Round	Opponent	Result
1982	First Round	Fort Valley State	L, 74–75
1987	First Round	St. Cloud State	L, 60–68
1992	First Round	Augustana (SD)	L, 70–83

=== AIAW College Division/Division II ===
The Mavericks made one appearance in the AIAW women's basketball tournament, with a combined record of 0–1.

Year	Round	Opponent	Result
1980	First Round	Cal Poly Pomona	L, 64–79

== Season–by–season results ==
Statistics overview
Season	Coach	Overall	Conference	Standing	Postseason
Joyce Morris () (1971–1973)
1971–72	Joyce Morris	2–6	—	—	
1972–73	Joyce Morris	4–7	—	—	
Joyce Morris:		6–13 (.316)	–		
Dee Grindle () (1973–1976)
1973–74	Dee Grindle	8–8	—	—	
1974–75	Dee Grindle	10–10	—	—	
1975–76	Dee Grindle	10–9	—	—	
Dee Grindle:		28–27 (.509)	–		
Cherri Mankenberg () (1976–1980)
1976–77	Cherri Mankenberg	17–12	—	—	
1977–78	Cherri Mankenberg	18–10	—	—	
1978–79	Cherri Mankenberg	19–12	—	—	
Cherri Mankenberg (North Central Conference) (1979–1998)
1979–80	Cherri Mankenberg	22–13	5—1	—	AIAW Division II First Round
1980–81	Cherri Mankenberg	27–7	7—1	—	
1981–82	Cherri Mankenberg	22–6	8—2	—	NCAA Division II First Round
1982–83	Cherri Mankenberg	13–14	5—5	—	
1983–84	Cherri Mankenberg	14–12	6—6	—	
1984–85	Cherri Mankenberg	14–14	5—9	—	
1985–86	Cherri Mankenberg	14–12	7—7	—	
1986–87	Cherri Mankenberg	21–8	11—3	—	NCAA Division II First Round
1987–88	Cherri Mankenberg	14–13	4—10	—	
1988–89	Cherri Mankenberg	14–14	5—9	—	
1989–90	Cherri Mankenberg	12–16	6—12	—	
1990–91	Cherri Mankenberg	12–16	7—11	—	
1991–92	Cherri Mankenberg	20–9	12—6	—	NCAA Division II First Round
1992–93	Cherri Mankenberg	7–19	4—14	—	
1993–94	Cherri Mankenberg	12–14	6—12	—	
1994–95	Cherri Mankenberg	14–13	8—10	—	
1995–96	Cherri Mankenberg	13–14	8—10	—	
1996–97	Cherri Mankenberg	16–10	9—9	—	
1997–98	Cherri Mankenberg	10–17	4—14	—	
Cherri Mankenberg:		345–275 (.556)	– (–)		
Paula Buscher (North Central Conference) (1998–2000)
1998–99	Paula Buscher	11–16	6—12	—	
1999–00	Paula Buscher	15–12	7—11	—	
Paul Buscher:		26–28 (.481)	13–23 (.361)		
Lisa Carlsen (North Central Conference) (2000–2004)
2000–01	Lisa Carlsen	8–18	6—12	—	
2001–02	Lisa Carlsen	11–18	7—11	—	
2002–03	Lisa Carlsen	12–16	5—11	—	
2003–04	Lisa Carlsen	5–22	0—14	—	
Lisa Carlsen:		36–74 (.327)	18–48 (.273)		
Patty Patton Shearer (North Central Conference) (2004–2008)
2004–05	Patty Patton Shearer	14–14	4—8	—	
2005–06	Patty Patton Shearer	20–11	5—7	—	
2006–07	Patty Patton Shearer	16–12	3—9	—	
2007–08	Patty Patton Shearer	17–12	3—9	—	
Patty Patton Shearer (Mid-America Intercollegiate Athletics Association) (2008–2011)
2008–09	Patty Patton Shearer	15–12	11—9	—	
2009–10	Patty Patton Shearer	12–15	7—13	—	
2010–11	Patty Patton Shearer	8–18	5—17	—	
Parry Patton Shearer:		102–94 (.520)	38–72 (.345)		
Chance Lindley (Independent) (2011–2012)
2011–12	Chance Lindley	15–12			
Chance Lindley (Summit League) (2012–2013)
2012–13	Chance Lindley	14–11	7—9	T—5th	
Chance Lindley:		29–23 (.558)	7–9 (.438)		
Brittany Lange (Summit League) (2013–2020)
2013–14	Brittany Lange	12–16	4—10	7th	
2014–15	Brittany Lange	10–18	5—11	7th	
2015–16	Brittany Lange	15–15	7—9	6th	
2016–17	Brittany Lange	16–15	8—8	5th	
2017–18	Brittany Lange	12–16	3—11	6th	
2018–19	Brittany Lange	8–21	2—14	9th	
2019–20	Brittany Lange	7–23	2—14	8th	
Brittany Lange:		80–124 (.392)	31–77 (.287)		
Carrie Banks (Summit League) (2020–present)
2020–21	Carrie Banks	7–13	4—8	T–7th	
2021–22	Carrie Banks	7–19	3—14	10th	
2022–23	Carrie Banks	15–17	8—10	6th	
Brittany Lange:		29–49 (.372)	15–32 (.319)		
Total:		677–684 (.497)			
National champion Postseason invitational champion Conference regular season champion Conference regular season and conference tournament champion Division regular season champion Division regular season and conference tournament champion Conference tournament champion
