= Morgan State Lady Bears basketball =

College level women's basketball team

Morgan State Lady Bears
2026–27 Morgan State Lady Bears basketball team
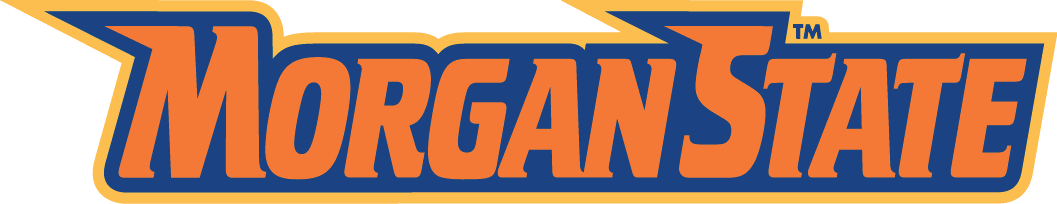
- University: Morgan State University
- Head coach: Nadine Domond (2nd season)
- Location: Baltimore, Maryland
- Arena: Hill Field House (capacity: 4,250)
- Conference: MEAC
- Nickname: Lady Bears
- Colors: Blue and orange

AIAW tournament quarterfinals
- Division II: 1980
Other AIAW tournament results
Second round	Division II: 1980
Appearances	Division II: 1980, 1981

Conference regular-season champions
- 2022

Uniforms
Home	Away

The Morgan State Lady Bears basketball team represents Morgan State University, located in Baltimore, Maryland, in Division I basketball competition. They currently compete in the Mid-Eastern Athletic Conference. The Lady Bears play their home games at the Talmadge L. Hill Field House.

The Lady Bears returned to Division I play and the MEAC in 1984, after an absence of 5 years. They have never won the MEAC Women's Basketball Tournament or have made an NCAA Division I women's basketball tournament appearance.

== Postseason ==
=== Women's National Invitation Tournament ===
The Lady Bears have made one appearance in the Women's National Invitation Tournament, with a record of 0–1.

Year	Round	Opponent	Result
2011	First Round	Virginia	L, 69–56

=== AIAW College Division/Division II ===
The Lady Bears made two appearances in the AIAW National Division II basketball tournament, with a combined record of 2–2.

Year	Round	Opponent	Result
1980	First Round; Second Round; Quarterfinals	Hofstra; Berry; College of Charleston	W, 62–52; W, 80–74; L, 56–64
1981	First Round	Louisiana College	L, 61–76
