= 1976 AIAW National Small College Basketball Championship =

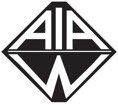

Tournament information
- Dates: March 23, 1976–March 27, 1976
- Administrator: Association for Intercollegiate Athletics for Women
- Host(s): Ashland College
- Venue(s): Ashland, Ohio
- Participants: 16

Final positions
- Champions: Berry (1st title)
- Runner-up: West Georgia

Tournament statistics
- Matches played: 16

The 1976 AIAW National Small College Basketball Championship was the second annual tournament hosted by the Association for Intercollegiate Athletics for Women to determine the national champion of women's collegiate basketball among its small college members in the United States.

The tournament was held at Ashland College in Ashland, Ohio between March 23 and March 27, 1976.

Berry defeated West Georgia in the championship game, 68–62, capturing the Vikings' first AIAW small college national title.

Sixteen teams participated in a single-elimination tournament that additionally included a third-place final for the two teams that lost in the semi-final games.

== Tournament bracket ==
First round
West Georgia	58
SE Louisiana	55
Princeton	72
Fort Lewis	47
Francis Marion	69
Grand View	68
Phillips (OK)	67
Cal Poly Pomona	63
Ashland	62
Biola	57
Tarkio	81
Eastern Montana	56
Union (KY)	107
Seton Hill	84
Berry (GA)	88
George Williams	54

Quarterfinals
West Georgia	59
Princeton	58
Francis Marion	64
Phillips (OK)	71
Ashland	67
Tarkio	63
Union (KY)	83
Berry (GA)	84

Semi-finals
West Georgia	77
Phillips (OK)	73
Ashland	83
Berry (GA)	84

National championship
West Georgia	62
Berry (GA)	68
Third place final
Phillips (OK)	107
Ashland	68

== See also ==
- 1976 AIAW National Large College Basketball Championship
