= 1974 AIAW National Basketball Championship =

1974 AIAW National Large College Basketball Championship
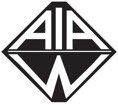

Tournament information
- Dates: March 20, 1974–March 23, 1974
- Administrator: Association for Intercollegiate Athletics for Women
- Host(s): Kansas State University
- Venue(s): Manhattan, Kansas
- Participants: 16

Final positions
- Champions: Immaculata (3rd title)
- Runner-up: Mississippi College

Tournament statistics
- Matches played: 27

The 1974 AIAW women's basketball tournament was held on March 20–23, 1974. The host site was Kansas State University in Manhattan, Kansas.

Sixteen teams participated, and Immaculata College, now known as Immaculata University, was crowned national champion at the conclusion of the tournament for the third straight year.

== Tournament bracket ==
=== Main bracket ===
First round* March 20, 1974
Immaculata	50
Kansas State	40
Indiana	59
Wayland Baptist	56
William Penn	54
Utah State	34
Stephen F. Austin	55
Illinois State	48
S. Connecticut St.	46
East Stroudsburg St.	43
Cal State Fullerton	58
Western Washington	40
Mississippi College	65
Tennessee Tech	63
Queens College	50
Fresno State	36

Quarterfinals*; March 21, 1974
Immaculata	60
Indiana	56
William Penn	52
Stephen F. Austin	46
S. Connecticut St.	55‡
Cal State Fullerton	53
Mississippi College	71
Queens College	67

Semifinals; March 22, 1974
Immaculata	57
William Penn	55
S. Connecticut St.	63
Mississippi College	67

Final; March 23, 1974
Immaculata	68
Mississippi College	53
Third place
William Penn	54
S. Connecticut St.	62

*Losers in the first round and quarterfinals continued in the consolation bracket (below)

‡ Double-overtime

=== Consolation bracket ===
First round
Kansas State	34
Wayland Baptist	49
Utah State	46
Illinois State	74
East Stroudsburg St.	59
Western Washington	81
Tennessee Tech	53
Fresno State	41

Second round
Cal State Fullerton	39
Wayland Baptist	54
Queens College	52
Illinois State	48
Indiana	50
Western Washington	44
Stephen F. Austin	43
Tennessee Tech	63

Third round
Wayland Baptist	72
Queens College	49
Indiana	44
Tennessee Tech	72

Fifth place game
Wayland Baptist	56
Tennessee Tech	50
