= San Francisco Dons women's basketball =

San Francisco Dons
| 2025-26 San Francisco Dons women's basketball team |
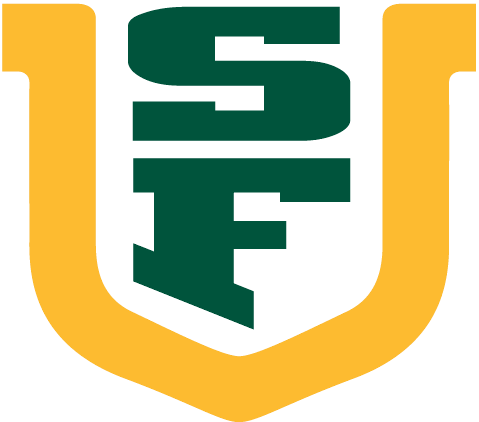
- University: University of San Francisco
- Head coach: Molly Goodenbour (9th season)
- Location: San Francisco, California
- Arena: War Memorial Gymnasium; Chase Center (capacity: 5,300/19,500)
- Conference: West Coast Conference
- Nickname: Dons
- Colors: Green and gold
- Student section: Los Locos

NCAA Division I tournament Sweet Sixteen
- 1996

NCAA Division I tournament appearances
- 1980, 1995, 1996, 1997, 2016

AIAW tournament appearances
- 1980

Conference tournament champions
- 1995, 1996, 1997, 2016

Conference regular-season champions
- 1980 (NCAC); 1987, 1992, 1995, 1996 (WCC)

Uniforms
| Home | Away | Alternate |

The San Francisco Dons women's basketball team represents the University of San Francisco in NCAA Division I women's college basketball. The Dons play in the West Coast Conference and their home games at the Sobrato Center's War Memorial Gymnasium, with occasional games played at Chase Center.

== History ==
San Francisco began play in 1976. Their first postseason appearance was in the 1980 AIAW National Division I Basketball Championship, losing 92–58 to BYU in the First Round. They made appearances in the NCAA Tournament in 1995, 1996, 1997, 2016, with a Sweet Sixteen appearance in 1996. That year, USF (ranked as a 5 seed) beat Florida 68–61, and Duke 64–60 before losing to Connecticut 72–44. They have made the WNIT three times. They played in the NCAC from 1977 to 1982 and the NORPAC from 1982 to 1985 before joining the West Coast Conference in 1985. As of the end of the 2015–16 season, the Dons have an all-time record of 546–595.

The Dons saw a major restructuring in the offseason between the 2022–23 and 2023–24 seasons. Two of their graduate-level starters, Ioanna Krimili (presently the 3-point record holder at USF) and Kennedy Dickie, transferred to UC Berkeley and Portland respectively. The San Francisco Chronicle described the transfers as happening all across the West Coast Conference, both between schools and out of the conference.

=== Molly Goodenbour abuse allegations ===
In 2022, a lawsuit was filed against USF head coach Molly Goodenbour with USF named as a secondary defendant. by former players Marta and Marija Galic. The Galic sisters, both overseas student athletes from Croatia, allege that Goodenbour engaged in “archaic and abusive conduct”, highlighting an instance where Goodenbour refused to allow Marta Galic to go to the bathroom and thereby forced her to urinate on herself in front of her teammates. Marija Galic additionally stated in the filing that Goodenbour subjectged her to verbal and psychological abuse, causing her to suffer from nervous breakdowns, and that Goodenbour did not follow the proper concussion protocols.

Goodenbour and USF responded to the suit by denying an intent to cause the harm the sisters described. Both further argued that the bathroom incident described by the sisters never happened. Mike Vartain, a lawyer for USF, said that Goodenbour would never want a player to urinate in their pants, and that no such prohibition on going to the bathroom without asking would exist.

The scandals revolving around Goodenbour, concurrent with abuse scandals surrounding Dons baseball coach Nino Giarratano, were credited with inciting the 2022 resignation of USF's athletic director Joan McDermott.

A San Francisco County Superior Court jury ruled in favor of Marija Galic, awarding her $750,000 because of “intentional infliction of emotional distress” by coach Goodenbour. The jury ruled against Marta Galic on her allegations.

== Postseason ==
=== NCAA tournament results ===
| Year | Seed | Round | Opponent | Result |
|---|---|---|---|---|
| 1995 | 11 | First round | (6) Arkansas | L 58–67 |
| 1996 | 12 | First round Second round Sweet Sixteen | (5) Florida (4) Duke (1) Connecticut | W 68–61; W 64–60; L 44–72 |
| 1997 | 11 | First round | (6) USC | L 55–68 |
| 2016 | 13 | First round | (4) Stanford | L 60–85 |

=== AIAW Division I ===
The Dons made one appearance in the AIAW National Division I basketball tournament, with a combined record of 0–1.

| Year | Round | Opponent | Result |
|---|---|---|---|
| 1980 | First round | BYU | L 58–92 |

=== AIAW Division II ===
The Dons made one appearance in the AIAW National Division II basketball tournament, with a combined record of 0–1.

| Year | Round | Opponent | Result |
|---|---|---|---|
| 1979 | First round | Niagara | L 52–56 |
