= 1976 AIAW National Large College Basketball Championship =

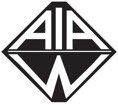

Tournament information
- Dates: March 25, 1976–March 28, 1976
- Administrator: Association for Intercollegiate Athletics for Women
- Host: Pennsylvania State University
- Venue: State College, Pennsylvania
- Participants: 16

Final positions
- Champions: Delta State (2nd title)
- Runner-up: Immaculata

Tournament statistics
- Matches played: 27

The 1976 AIAW women's basketball tournament was held March 25–28, 1976. The host site was Pennsylvania State University in State College, Pennsylvania. Sixteen teams participated, and Delta State University was crowned national champion at the conclusion of the tournament, for the second straight season, before a crowd of 6,200.

== Tournament bracket ==
=== Main bracket ===
First round* March 25, 1976
Delta State	88
Penn State	46
S. Connecticut St.	72
Baylor	76
Wayland Baptist	85
Utah	46
Mississippi College	91
Queens College	80
William Penn	78
Tennessee Tech	70
Cal State Fullerton	103
Wisconsin–La Crosse	85
Immaculata	84
Long Beach State	65
Montclair State	86
Portland State	49

Quarterfinals*; March 26, 1976
Delta State	97
Baylor	57
Wayland Baptist	75
Mississippi College	59
William Penn	64
Cal State Fullerton	61
Immaculata	103
Montclair State	82

Semifinals; March 27, 1976
Delta State	61
Wayland Baptist	60
William Penn	52
Immaculata	74

Final; March 28, 1976
Delta State	69
Immaculata	64
Third place
Wayland Baptist	74
William Penn	54

*Losers in the first round and quarterfinals continued in the consolation bracket (below)

=== Consolation bracket ===
First round
Penn State	51
S. Connecticut St.	63
Utah	57
Queens College	77
Tennessee Tech	116
Wisconsin–La Crosse	78
Long Beach State	74
Portland State	54

Second round
Cal State Fullerton	51
S. Connecticut St.	61
Montclair State	98‡
Queens College	93
Baylor	78
Tennessee Tech	89
Mississippi College	95
Long Beach State	81

Third Round
S. Connecticut St.	56
Montclair State	65
Tennessee Tech	111
Mississippi College	93

Fifth-place game
Montclair State	88
Tennessee Tech	94

‡ Double-overtime

== See also ==
- 1976 AIAW National Small College Basketball Championship
