= Tarleton State Texans women's basketball =

American women's college basketball team

2026–27 Tarleton State Texans women's basketball team
- University: Tarleton State University
- First season: 1968
- Head coach: Bill Brock (4th season)
- Location: Stephenville, Texas
- Arena: EECU Center (capacity: 8,000)
- Conference: United Athletic Conference
- Nickname: Texans
- Colors: Purple and white

NCAA Division II tournament round of 32
- 2011, 2014

NCAA Division II tournament appearances
- 2006, 2010, 2011, 2012, 2013, 2014, 2017, 2018, 2019

AIAW tournament second round
- Division III: 1980

AIAW tournament appearances
- Division III: 1980, 1981

Conference tournament champions
- Lone Star: 2004, 2013, 2014

Conference regular-season champions
- Lone Star: 2012

Conference division champions
- Lone Star South: 2011

The Tarleton State Texans women's basketball team represents Tarleton State University, located in Stephenville, Texas. Through the 2019–20 season, the team competed in NCAA Division II as a member of the Lone Star Conference. The Texans began a four-year transition to NCAA Division I in July 2020, joining the United Athletic Conference (formerly known as the Western Athletic Conference prior to 2026). The Texans are currently coached by first-year head coach Bill Brock and play their games at EECU Center on the university campus in Stephenville. The new arena, set to open for the 2025–26 season, replaces Wisdom Gymnasium, which had been the Texans' home since 1970.

== Postseason ==
=== NCAA Division II ===
During their era as the TexAnns, the Texans made nine appearances in the NCAA Division II women's basketball tournament. They had a combined record of 2–9.

Year	Round	Opponent	Result
2006	First round	Emporia State	L 67–85
2010	First round	Emporia State	L 71–90
2011	First round Regional semifinals	Southeastern Oklahoma; Northwestern Missouri State	W 86–75; L 61–77
2012	First round	Emporia State	L 56–64
2013	First round	Midwestern State	L 78–91
2014	First round Regional semifinals	Texas A&M International; Colorado Mesa	W 70–55; L 44–66
2017	First round	CSU Pueblo	L 59–68
2018	First round	Lubbock Christian	L 46–78
2019	First round	Lubbock Christian	L 53–84

=== NAIA Division I ===
The TexAnns made one appearance in the NAIA Division I women's basketball tournament, with a combined record of 0–1.

Year	Seed	Round	Opponent	Result
1984	NR	First round	#7 Berry	L 65–74

=== AIAW Division III ===
The TexAnns made two appearances in the AIAW National Division III basketball tournament. They had a combined record of 1–2.

Year	Round	Opponent	Result
1980	First round Second Round	Spring Arbor; Mount Mercy	W 69–68; L 81–90
1981	First round	San Francisco State	L, 54–56
