= 1980 AIAW National Division II Basketball Championship =

1980 AIAW National Small College Basketball Championship
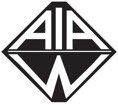

Tournament information
- Administrator: Association for Intercollegiate Athletics for Women
- Host(s): University of Dayton
- Venue(s): Dayton, Ohio
- Participants: 24

Final positions
- Champions: Dayton (1st title)
- Runner-up: College of Charleston

Tournament statistics
- Matches played: 24

The 1980 AIAW National Division II Basketball Championship was the inaugural tournament hosted by the Association for Intercollegiate Athletics for Women to determine the national champion of collegiate basketball among its Division II members in the United States.

The tournament was held at the University of Dayton in Dayton, Ohio.

Hosts Dayton defeated College of Charleston in the championship game, 83–53, to capture the Flyers' first AIAW Division II national title.

== Format ==
Twenty-four teams participated in a single-elimination tournament, with eight teams receiving byes into the second round.

The tournament also included a third-place game for the two teams that lost in the semifinal games.

== Tournament bracket ==
First round
William Penn	69
Carson-Newman	57
Langston	59
Air Force	58
St. Peter's	75
Niagara	55
Morgan State	62
Hofstra	52
Cal Poly Pomona	79
Nebraska–Omaha	64
Cal State Los Angeles	84*
Idaho	81
Lenoir-Rhyne	80
SE Missouri State	63
Louisiana College	61
West Georgia	55

Second round
South Carolina State	68
William Penn	69
Charleston (WV)	80
Langston	75
College of Charleston	75
St. Peter's	58
Berry	74
Morgan State	80
Arkansas Tech	56
Cal Poly Pomona	59
Dayton	105
Cal State Los Angeles	88
St. John Fisher	65
Lenoir-Rhyne	79
Livingston	77
Louisiana College	86

Quarterfinals
William Penn	75
Charleston (WV)	68
College of Charleston	64
Morgan State	56
Cal Poly Pomona	79
Dayton	88
Lenoir-Rhyne	61
Louisiana College	62

Semifinals
William Penn	49
College of Charleston	67
Dayton	77
Louisiana College	52

National championship
College of Charleston	53
Dayton	83
Third place final
William Penn	77*
Louisiana College	71

== See also ==
- 1980 AIAW National Division I Basketball Championship
- 1980 AIAW National Division III Basketball Championship
