= Charleston Cougars women's basketball =

Charleston Cougars
2026–27 Charleston Cougars women's basketball team
- University: College of Charleston
- Head coach: Amanda Butler (1st season)
- Location: Charleston, South Carolina
- Arena: TD Arena (capacity: 5,100)
- Conference: Coastal Athletic Association
- Nickname: Cougars
- Colors: Maroon and white

NCAA Division I tournament appearances
- 2026

AIAW tournament runner-up
- Division II: 1980, 1981, 1982
Other AIAW tournament results
Final Four	Division II: 1980, 1981, 1982
Quarterfinals	Division II: 1980, 1981, 1982
Second round	Division II: 1980
Appearances	Division II: 1980, 1981, 1982

Conference tournament champions
- 2026

Conference regular-season champions
- 2026

The Charleston Cougars women's basketball team represent the College of Charleston in the Coastal Athletic Association of NCAA Division I women's college basketball. They are led by head coach Amanda Butler, who is in her first season.

== History ==
The College of Charleston women Maroons were first formed in 1919. Pierrine Smith Byrd, who would become the College's first female graduate in 1922, was the team's first captain. Under head coach Nancy Wilson, the Cougars appeared in the AIAW National Division II Championship Game three times from 1980 to 1982.

The Cougars moved up to NCAA Division I and joined the Trans America Athletic Conference (now known as the ASUN Conference) in 1991. They joined the Southern Conference in 1998, and later joined the Coastal Athletic Association in 2013.

The team has made three appearances in the Women's Basketball Invitational, in 2010 under head coach Nancy Wilson, and again in 2013 and 2014, under head coach Natasha Adair. Since current head coach Robin Harmony was hired in 2019, the Cougars have appeared in the Women's National Invitation Tournament twice, and made their first NCAA Tournament appearance in 2026, after winning the CAA Tournament for the first time.

== Coaches ==
The Cougars have had eight head coaches since their first season in 1974. The current coach was hired in 2019.

Coach	Years	Overall record
Joan Cronan	1974–1976	43–12
Nancy Wilson	1976–1984	193–63 (3 AIAW Div II National Runners-Up)
Scooter Barnette	1984–1994	182–104
Kathy McCaskill-Rhein	1994–1998	32–74
Melissa Slone	1998–2003	45–94
Nancy Wilson (Second stint)	2003–2012	118–152 (1 WBI appearance) (311–215 Career Total)
Natasha Adair	2012–2014	35–31 (2 WBI appearances)
Candice Jackson	2014–2019	39–113
Robin Harmony	2019–2026	122–81 (1 NCAA appearance & 2 WNIT appearances)
Overall record:		809–724 (through 2025–26 regular season)

== Postseason ==
=== NCAA tournament results ===
The Cougars have appeared in the NCAA tournament one time. Their record is 0–1.

Year	Seed	Round	Opponent	Result
2026	#14	First round	#3 Duke	L 64–81

=== WNIT results ===
The Cougars have appeared in the Women's National Invitation Tournament (WNIT) two times. Their combined record is 2–2.

Year	Round	Opponent	Result
2024	First round Second round	USC Upstate; Illinois State	W 78–60; L 67–74
2025	Second round Super 16	Howard; Rutgers	W 76–56; L 67–89

=== WBI results ===
The Cougars have appeared in the Women's Basketball Invitational (WBI) three times. Their combined record is 5–3.

Year	Round	Opponent	Result
2010	First round Quarterfinals; Semifinals	Morehead State; Bradley; Appalachian State	W 67–59; W 76–66; L 58–77
2013	First round Quarterfinals	Northern Kentucky; Detroit Mercy	W 72–70; L 67–79
2014	First round Quarterfinals; Semifinals	USC Upstate; Northern Kentucky; Stephen F. Austin	W 85–71; W 60–54; L 74–78

=== AIAW College Division/Division II ===
The Cougars made three appearances in the AIAW National Division II Basketball Tournament, with a combined record of 9–3.

Year	Round	Opponent	Result
1980	Second round Quarterfinals; Semifinals; National Championship	Saint Peter's; Morgan State; William Penn; Dayton	W, 75–58; W, 64–56; W, 67–49; L, 53–83
1981	First round Quarterfinals; Semifinals; National Championship	Southwest Missouri State; Tuskegee; Cal Poly Pomona; William Penn	W, 70–55; W, 85–68; W, 102–84; L, 51–64
1982	First round Quarterfinals; Semifinals; National Championship	Florida International; Livington; North Dakota State; Francis Marion	W, 96–44; W, 65–48; W, 88–73; L, 83–92
