= 1973 AIAW National Basketball Championship =

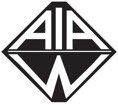

Tournament information
- Dates: March 22, 1973–March 25, 1973
- Administrator: Association for Intercollegiate Athletics for Women
- Host(s): Queens College
- Venue(s): Queens, New York City, New York
- Participants: 16

Final positions
- Champions: Immaculata (2nd title)
- Runner-up: Queens

Tournament statistics
- Matches played: 27

The 1973 AIAW women's basketball tournament was held on March 22–25, 1973. The host site was Queens College in Flushing, New York. Sixteen teams participated, and Immaculata College, now known as Immaculata University, was crowned national champion at the conclusion of the tournament, for the second straight year.

Immaculata finished the season undefeated (20–0), becoming the first undefeated national champion in women's college basketball.

== Tournament bracket ==
=== Main bracket ===
First round* March 22, 1973
Immaculata	59
Indiana State	48
Western Washington	55
East Carolina	51
S. Connecticut St.	56
Kansas State	52
Long Beach State	46
Mercer	55
Indiana	46
Lehman	43
South Carolina	59
East Stroudsburg State	66
Queens College	62
UC Riverside	36
Stephen F. Austin	53
Utah State	48

Quarterfinals; March 23, 1973
Immaculata	66
Western Washington	53
S. Connecticut St.	58
Mercer	46
Indiana	56
East Stroudsburg St.	52
Queens College	59†
Stephen F. Austin	56

Semifinals; March 24, 1973
Immaculata	47
S. Connecticut St.	45
Indiana	40
Queens College	52

Final; March 25, 1973
Immaculata	59
Queens College	52
Third place
S. Connecticut St.	76
Indiana	53

*Losers in the first round continued in the consolation bracket (below)

† Overtime

=== Consolation bracket ===
First round March 23, 1973
Indiana State	49
East Carolina	60
Kansas State	49
Long Beach State	43
Lehman	53
South Carolina	58
UC Riverside	47
Utah State	41

Second round March 23, 1973
East Carolina	46
Kansas State	47
South Carolina	49
UC Riverside	36

Fifth place game March 24, 1973
Kansas State	69
South Carolina	57
