= 1982 NAIA men's basketball tournament =

College basketball tournament

- Teams: 32
- Finals site: Kemper Arena; Kansas City, Missouri
- Champions: South Carolina-Spartanburg (1 title, 1 title game, 1 Fab Four)
- Runner-up: Biola (1 title game, 1 Fab Four)
- Semifinalists: Hampton (1 Final Four); Kearney State (2 Final Four)
- Charles Stevenson Hustle Award: Warren Ellis (Biola)
- Chuck Taylor MVP: Mike Gibson (South Carolina-Spartanburg)

The 1982 NAIA men's basketball tournament was held in March at Kemper Arena in Kansas City, Missouri. The 45th annual NAIA basketball tournament featured 32 teams playing in a single-elimination format. South Carolina-Spartanburg became the champion.

== Awards and honors ==
- Leading scorers:
- Leading rebounder:
- Player of the Year: est. 1994.

== 1982 NAIA bracket ==
First round	Second round
1	Biola (Calif.)	69
-	West Virginia Tech	66
1	Biola	62
16	Quincy	56
16	Quincy (Ill.)	95
-	Cedarville (Ohio)	65
TOP TIER
9	Southern Tech (Ga.)	84
-	Paul Quinn (Tex.)	79
-	Saginaw Valley	67
9	Southern Tech	61
-	Saginaw Valley (Mich.)	60
8	Stephen F. Austin State (Tex.)	48
5	David Lipscomb (Tenn.)	87
-	Kearney State (Neb.)	92
-	Kearney State	77
12	Hanover	76
-	Westminster (Pa.)	39
12	Hanover (Ind.)	49
TOP TIER
13	Western New Mexico	58
-	Briar Cliff (Iowa)	59*
4	Western Oregon	63
-	Briar Cliff	55
-	Missouri Western State	66
4	Western Oregon	76
3	Xavier (La.)	57
-	St. Mary’s (Tex.)	73
-	St. Mary’s (TX)	53
14	South Carolina Spartanburg	63
-	Franklin Pierce (N.H.)	62
14	South Carolina Spartanburg	75
BOTTOM TIER
11	St. Thomas Aquinas (N.Y.)	72
-	Washburn (Kan.)	68
11	St. Thomas Aquinas	77
6	Wisconsin Eau Claire	91
-	Mary (N.D.)	73
6	Wisconsin-Eau Claire	74
7	Catawba (N.C.)	75
-	Moorhead State (Minn.)	82
-	Morehead State	61
10	Henderson State	70
-	Birmingham-Southern (Ala.)	52
10	Henderson State (Ark.)	53
BOTTOM TIER
15	Central Washington	74
-	Cumberland (Ky.)	65
15	Central Washington	49
-	Hampton Institute	63
-	Hampton Institute (Va.)	65
2	Oklahoma Christian	64

Elite Eight
1	Biola	42
-	Saginaw Valley	40
-	Kearney State	97
4	Western Oregon	95
14	South Carolina Spartanburg	76
6	Wisconsin Eau Claire	64
10	Henderson State	66
-	Hampton Institute	70

NAIA national semifinals
1	Biola	84
-	Kearney State	75
14	South Carolina Spartanburg	68
-	Hampton Institute	54

NAIA national championship
1	Biola	38
14	South Carolina Spartanburg	51

- * denotes overtime.

=== Third-place game ===
The third-place game featured the losing teams from the national semifinalist to determine 3rd and 4th places in the tournament. This game was played until 1988.

NAIA third-place game
-	Hampton Institute	98
-	Kearney State	94

== See also ==
- 1982 NCAA Division I men's basketball tournament
- 1982 NCAA Division II men's basketball tournament
- 1982 NCAA Division III men's basketball tournament
- 1982 NAIA women's basketball tournament
