= 1982 NAIA women's basketball tournament =

- Teams: 8
- Finals site: , Kansas City, Missouri
- Champions: SW Oklahoma State (1st title, 1st title game, 1st Fab Four)
- Runner-up: Missouri Southern (1st title game, 1st Fab Four)
- Semifinalists: Saginaw Valley State (1st Fab Four); Berry (1st Fab Four)
- Coach of the year: John Loftin (SW Oklahoma State)
- Chuck Taylor MVP: Kelli Litsch (SW Oklahoma State)
- Top scorer: Pam Brisby (Missouri Southern) (64 points)

The 1982 NAIA women's basketball tournament was the second annual tournament held by the NAIA to determine the national champion of women's college basketball among its members in the United States and Canada.

Southwest Oklahoma State defeated Missouri Southern in the championship game, 80–45, to claim the Bulldogs' first NAIA national title.

The tournament was played in Kansas City, Missouri.

== Qualification ==
The tournament field was again set at eight teams. All teams were seeded.

The tournament utilized a simple single-elimination format, with an additional third-place game for the losers of the two semifinals.

Qualified Teams
School	Appearance	Last Bid
Berry	2nd	1981
California Baptist	1st	Never
Charleston (WV)	1st	Never
Missouri Southern	1st	Never
Saginaw Valley State	2nd	1981
Southwestern Oklahoma State	1st	Never
Spring Garden	1st	Never
Texas Southern	2nd	1981

== Bracket ==
Quarterfinals
1	SW Oklahoma State	77
8	Spring Garden	43
5	Texas Southern	58
4	Saginaw Valley	65
3	Charleston (WV)	65
6	Missouri Southern	74
7	California Baptist	65
2	Berry	102

Semifinals
1	SW Oklahoma State	84
4	Saginaw Valley	70
6	Missouri Southern	59
2	Berry	57

National championship
1	SW Oklahoma State	80
6	Missouri Southern	45
National third place
4	Saginaw Valley	71
2	Berry	61

== See also ==
- 1982 AIAW National Division I Basketball Championship (final version)
- 1982 NCAA Division I women's basketball tournament
- 1982 AIAW National Division II Basketball Championship (final version)
- 1982 NCAA Division II women's basketball tournament
- 1982 AIAW National Division III Basketball Championship (final version)
- 1982 NCAA Division III women's basketball tournament
- 1982 NAIA men's basketball tournament
