= USC Upstate Spartans men's basketball =

College basketball team

USC Upstate Spartans
2025–26 USC Upstate Spartans men's basketball team
- University: University of South Carolina Upstate
- Head coach: Marty Richter (2nd season)
- Location: Valley Falls, South Carolina
- Arena: G. B. Hodge Center (capacity: 818)
- Conference: Big South
- Nickname: Spartans
- Colors: Green, white, and black

NCAA Division I tournament appearances
- 1991*, 1992*, 1996*, 1998*, 2005*, 2006*

NAIA tournament champions
- 1982
Other NAIA tournament results
Semifinals	1982
Quarterfinals	1982, 1990
Appearances	1981, 1982, 1990

Uniforms
Home	Away	Alternate
- * at Division II level

The USC Upstate Spartans men's basketball team represents the University of South Carolina Upstate in Spartanburg, South Carolina, United States. The school's team formerly competed in the ASUN Conference, but moved to the Big South Conference in 2018–19. Play their home games at the G. B. Hodge Center. During their time as a member of the NAIA, they were national champions in 1982. Since their move to Division I in 2007, they have yet to qualify for the NCAA tournament.

== Postseason ==
=== CIT results ===
The Spartans have appeared in four CollegeInsider.com Postseason Tournaments (CIT). Their record in the CIT is 2–4.

Year	Round	Opponent	Result
2012	First round Second Round	Kent State; Old Dominion	W 73–58; L 56–65
2014	First round	Towson	L 60–63
2015	First round Second Round	James Madison; UT Martin	W 73–72; L 49–60
2017	First round	Furman	L 57–79

=== The Basketball Classic results ===
The Spartans have appeared in The Basketball Classic one time. Their record is 1–1.

Year	Round	Opponent	Result
2022	First round Second Round	Appalachian State; South Alabama	W 80–74; L 79–83

=== CBI results ===
The Spartans have appeared in one College Basketball Invitational (CBI) tournament. Their record is 0–1.

Year	Round	Opponent	Result
2023	First Round	Indiana State	L 62–67

=== NCAA Division II Tournament results ===
The Spartans have appeared in six NCAA Division II Tournaments. Their record is 5–6.

Year	Round	Opponent	Result
1991	Regional semifinals Regional Finals	Johnson C. Smith; Virginia Union	W 99–74; L 73–77
1992	Regional semifinals Regional Finals	Rollins; Jacksonville State	W 87–83; L 87–105
1996	Regional Quarterfinals; Regional Finals	Clark Atlanta; Alabama A&M	W 91–71; L 91–106
1998	Regional Quarterfinals; Regional Finals	Johnson C. Smith; Virginia Union	W 95–67; L 61–91
2005	Regional semifinals Regional 3rd-place game	Winston-Salem State; Virginia Union	W 63–59; L 67–85
2006	Regional Quarterfinals	Columbus State	L 88–90 ^{OT}

=== NAIA Tournament results ===
The Spartans have appeared in three NAIA Tournaments. Their combined record is 8–2 and were national champions in 1982.

Year	Round	Opponent	Result
1981	First round Second Round	Henderson State; Hanover	W 61–50; L 60–72
1982	First round Second Round; Quarterfinals; Semifinals; National Championship Game	Franklin Pierce; Saint Mary's (TX); Wisconsin-Eau Claire; Hampton; Biola	W 75–62; W 63–53; W 74–64; W 68–54; W 51–38
1990	First round Second Round; Quarterfinals	Geneva; Grand Canyon; Birmingham Southern	W 80–54; W 75–69; L 80–87
