= 1982 AIAW National Division I Basketball Championship =

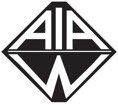

Tournament information
- Dates: March 21, 1982–March 28, 1982
- Administrator: Association for Intercollegiate Athletics for Women
- Venue(s): Philadelphia, Pennsylvania
- Participants: 16

Final positions
- Champions: Rutgers
- Runner-up: Texas

Tournament statistics
- Matches played: 15

The 1982 AIAW National Division I Basketball Championship was held on March 21–28, 1982. Sixteen teams participated, and Rutgers University was crowned champion of the tournament. The host site for the Final Four was The Palestra on the University of Pennsylvania campus in Philadelphia.

This was the first season the NCAA sponsored a women's basketball tournament, and the two tournaments were held at the same time. Many schools, including defending champion Louisiana Tech, chose to participate in the NCAA tournament rather than in the AIAW tournament. Only three top 20 teams appeared in the AIAW tournament: Texas, Rutgers and Villanova. Sports Illustrated wrote at the time: "With the NCAA staging women's championships this year for the first time, the AIAW, the 11-year-old organization that put women's college sports on the map, finds itself barely clinging to life. So many of its members have fled to the NCAA that the AIAW's only realistic hope for survival is its pending antitrust suit against the NCAA in U.S. District Court in Washington, D.C." This proved to be the final AIAW basketball tournament.

== Opening rounds ==
=== East Regional ===
First Round; March 21, 1982
1	Rutgers	89
4	Georgia Southern	79
3	Minnesota	68
2	St. John's (NY)	56

Quarterfinals; March 23, 1982
Rutgers	83
Minnesota	75

=== Mideast Regional ===
First Round; March 21, 1982
1	Villanova	69
4	Miami (OH)	61
3	Delta State	90
2	Vanderbilt	79

Quarterfinals; March 23, 1982
Villanova	87
Delta State	72

=== Midwest Regional ===
First Round; March 21, 1982
1	Texas	67
4	Central Missouri State	54
3	Wisconsin	60
2	Colorado	59

Quarterfinals; March 23, 1982
Texas	73
Wisconsin	61

=== West Regional ===
First Round; March 21, 1982
1	California	66
4	Arkansas	62
3	Wayland Baptist	57
2	Montana	52

Quarterfinals; March 23, 1982
California	70
Wayland Baptist	85

== Final Four – Philadelphia, PA ==
Semifinals; March 26, 1982
1	Rutgers	83
4	Villanova	75
3	Texas	82
2	Wayland Baptist	63

Championship; March 28, 1982
Rutgers	83
Texas	77

== See also ==
- 1982 AIAW National Division II Basketball Championship
- 1982 AIAW National Division III Basketball Championship
- 1982 NCAA Division I women's basketball tournament
- 1982 NCAA Division II women's basketball tournament
- 1982 NCAA Division III women's basketball tournament
- 1982 NAIA women's basketball tournament
