= 1982 AIAW National Division III Basketball Championship =

1982 AIAW National Division III College Basketball Championship
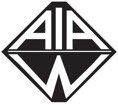

Tournament information
- Administrator: Association for Intercollegiate Athletics for Women
- Venue: Cedar Rapids, Iowa
- Participants: 7

Final positions
- Champions: Concordia–Moorhead (1st title)
- Runner-up: Mount Mercy

Tournament statistics
- Matches played: 7

The 1982 AIAW National Division III Basketball Championship was the third annual and final tournament hosted by the Association for Intercollegiate Athletics for Women to determine the national champion of collegiate basketball among its Division III members in the United States.

The tournament was held in Cedar Rapids, Iowa.

Concordia–Moorhead defeated Mount Mercy in the championship game, 73–72, to capture the Cobbers' first AIAW Division III national title.

== Format ==
Seven teams participated in a single-elimination tournament, a decrease in nine teams from the previous year's championship.

The tournament also included a third-place game for the two teams that lost in the semifinal games.

== Tournament bracket ==
First round
Millersville State	43
Aquinas	40

Quarterfinals
Concordia–Moorhead	74
Malone	64
Millersville State	70
Knoxville	66

Semifinals
Concordia–Moorhead	67
Millersville State	57
Mount Mercy	71
Wisconsin–Whitewater	60

National championship
Concordia–Moorhead	73
Mount Mercy	72
Third place
Wisconsin–Whitewater	61
Millersville State	51

== See also ==
- 1982 AIAW National Division I Basketball Championship (final edition)
- 1982 AIAW National Division II Basketball Championship (final edition)
- 1982 NAIA women's basketball tournament
