= Princeton Tigers women's basketball =

2026–27 Princeton Tigers women's basketball team
- University: Princeton University
- First season: 1972; 54 years ago
- Head coach: Lauren Gosselin (1st season)
- Location: Princeton, New Jersey
- Arena: Jadwin Gymnasium (capacity: 6,854)
- Conference: Ivy League
- Nickname: Tigers
- Colors: Black and orange
- All-time record: 771–567 (.576)

NCAA Division I tournament second round
- 2015, 2022, 2023

NCAA Division I tournament appearances
- 2010, 2011, 2012, 2013, 2015, 2016, 2018, 2019, 2022, 2023, 2024, 2025, 2026

AIAW tournament quarterfinals
- Division II: 1976
Other AIAW tournament results
Appearances	Division II: 1976

Conference tournament champions
- 2018, 2019, 2022, 2023, 2024, 2026

Conference regular-season champions
- 1975, 1976, 1977, 1978, 1985, 1999, 2006, 2010, 2011, 2012, 2013, 2015, 2018, 2019, 2020, 2022, 2023, 2024, 2026

Uniforms
Home	Away

The Princeton Tigers women's basketball team is the intercollegiate women's basketball program representing Princeton University. The school competes in the Ivy League in Division I of the National Collegiate Athletic Association (NCAA). The Tigers play home basketball games at the Jadwin Gymnasium in Princeton, New Jersey on the university campus. Princeton has won nineteen Ivy League regular season titles as well as six of eight Ivy League tournament titles since the tournament's inception. The team will made their thirteenth appearance in an NCAA Women's Division I Basketball Championship in the 2026 tournament.

== Highlights ==
The Tigers first season was the 1971–72 season. They began play with their first ever game being played on February 2, 1972. The 2009–10 team began one of the best overall record streaks in Princeton women's basketball history. Entering the post-season with a 26–2 overall record, the Tigers were one of five teams in the country with two or fewer losses. The other four teams earned No. 1 seeds in the NCAA Tournament. Sweeping the Ivy League with a 14–0 mark, the Tigers earned a No. 12 seed to the NCAA Tournament. In 2011–12, Princeton was the first-ever Ivy League women's team to receive a national ranking. The Tigers moved into the AP Top 25 Poll, earning a No. 24 national ranking in the Week 18 poll. The Tigers won their third consecutive Ivy League Championship that season and earned the No. 9 seed into the NCAA Tournament. In 2012–13, Princeton earned the No. 9 seed, after winning the Ivy League for the fourth consecutive season. Niveen Rasheed earned an Associated Press All-American recognition that season. The 2014–15 team finished the season 31–1, 14–0 to win the Ivy League regular season title to earn an automatic trip to the 2015 NCAA Division I women's basketball tournament, which they lost to Maryland in the second round. The Tigers' No. 13 ranking in both the Associated Press Top-25 and USA Today Coaches polls are the highest in conference history. Princeton's No. 8 seed is the best an Ivy program has ever earned, and the Tigers' first round win over Green Bay was just the second NCAA victory for an Ivy team, joining No. 16 Harvard's upset over No. 1 Stanford in 1998.

During the 2016–17 season, head coach Courtney Banghart notched her 200th win, all within her Princeton tenure.

During the 2021–22 season, Abby Meyers led Princeton with 17.9 points and 5.8 rebounds per game, as she shot 45.9 percent from the field and 40.9 percent from three-point range. She ranked first in the conference in three-point percentage, effective field goal percentage, true shooting percentage, and player efficiency rating, second in scoring, third in 2-point field goal percentage (15.9%), and eighth in rebounds. She helped lead Princeton to a third consecutive Ivy League championship. Following the season she was named the Ivy League Player of the Year and a unanimous selection to the All-Ivy First Team. She was also named an Associated Press All-American honorable mention, becoming the fourth All-American in program history.

== 2025–26 roster ==
2025–26 Princeton Tigers women's basketball team
Players
Coaches

Pos.	#	Name	Height	Year	Hometown
G	10	Skye Belker	5 ft 9 in (1.75 m)	Jr	Los Angeles, CA
F	11	Taylor Charles	6 ft 2 in (1.88 m)	Sr	Elgin, IL
G	13	Ashley Chea	5 ft 8 in (1.73 m)	Jr	Montebello, CA
F	1	Emily Eadie	6 ft 1 in (1.85 m)	So	Newport Beach, CA
G/F	2	Olivia Hutcherson	6 ft 0 in (1.83 m)	Jr	Johns Creek, GA
F	8	Sarah Lessig	6 ft 2 in (1.88 m)	Fr	Seattle, WA
G	21	Toby Nweke	5 ft 10 in (1.78 m)	So	Woodbine, MD
G	4	Grace O'Sullivan	6 ft 0 in (1.83 m)	Fr	Acton, MA
G	3	Cristina Parrella	5 ft 11 in (1.8 m)	So	Closter, NJ
G	23	Madison St. Rose	5 ft 10 in (1.78 m)	Sr	Old Bridge, NJ
G/F	5	Fadima Tall	6 ft 1 in (1.85 m)	Jr	Silver Spring, MD

Head coach

- Carla Berube (Connecticut)

Assistant coach(es)

- Lauren Gosselin (Tufts)
- Lauren Dillon (Bentley)
- Jordan Edwards (High Point)
- Lilly Paro (Tufts)

Legend

- (C) Team captain
- (S) Suspended
- (I) Ineligible
- (W) Walk-on
- Injured
- Current redshirt

Roster
Last update: March 14, 2026

== Coaches ==
Coaching records
Name	Years	W–L (%)
Penny Hinckley	1971–1974	15–13 (.536)
Pat Walsh	1974–1979	72–38 (.655)
Diane Schumacher	1979–1982	29–52 (.358)
Jeanne Foley	1982–1984	19–32 (.373)
Joan Kowalik	1984–1995	163–121 (.574)
Elizabeth Feeley	1995–2000	68–70 (.493)
Kevin Morris	2000–2001	2–25 (.074)
Richard Barron	2001–2007	74–91 (.448)
Courtney Banghart	2007–2019	254–103 (.711)
Carla Berube	2019–2026	147–29 (.835)
Lauren Gosselin	2026–present	0–0 (–)

== Ivy League ==
Opponent	First Gm.	Last Gm.	W	L	Pct.
Brown University	1974	2026	63	33	.656
Columbia University	1979	2026	62	22	.738
Cornell University	1974	2026	70	21	.769
Dartmouth College	1977	2026	50	44	.532
Harvard University	1974	2026	58	43	.574
University of Pennsylvania	1974	2026	73	30	.709
Yale University	1973	2026	72	32	.692

== Postseason ==
=== NCAA Division I ===
The Tigers have made the NCAA Division I women's basketball tournament 13 times. They have a combined record of 3–13.

Year	Seed	Round	Opponent	Result
2010	#11	First Round	#6 St. John's	L 47–65
2011	#12	First Round	#5 Georgetown	L 49–65
2012	#9	First Round	#8 Kansas State	L 64–67
2013	#9	First Round	#8 Florida State	L 44–60
2015	#8	First Round; Second Round	#9 Green Bay #1 Maryland	W 80–70; L 70–85
2016	#11	First Round	#6 West Virginia	L 65–74
2018	#12	First Round	#5 Maryland	L 57–77
2019	#11	First Round	#6 Kentucky	L 77–82
2022	#11	First Round; Second Round	#6 Kentucky #3 Indiana	W 69–62; L 55–56
2023	#10	First Round; Second Round	#7 NC State #2 Utah	W 64–63; L 56-63
2024	#9	First Round	#8 West Virginia	L 53–63
2025	#11	First Four	#11 Iowa State	L 63–68
2026	#9	First Round	#8 Oklahoma State	L 68–82

=== AIAW College Division/Division II ===
The Tigers made one appearance in the AIAW National Division II basketball tournament. They had a record of 1–1.

Year	Round	Opponent	Result
1976	First Round; Quarterfinals	Fort Lewis; West Georgia	W 72–47; L 58–59
