= 1982 AIAW National Division II Basketball Championship =

1982 AIAW National Division II College Basketball Championship
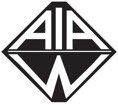

Tournament information
- Administrator: Association for Intercollegiate Athletics for Women
- Host(s): College of Charleston
- Venue(s): Charleston, South Carolina
- Participants: 8

Final positions
- Champions: Francis Marion (1st title)
- Runner-up: College of Charleston

Tournament statistics
- Matches played: 8

The 1982 AIAW National Division II Basketball Championship was the third annual and final tournament hosted by the Association for Intercollegiate Athletics for Women to determine the national champion of collegiate basketball among its Division II members in the United States.

The tournament was held at the College of Charleston in Charleston, South Carolina.

Francis Marion defeated College of Charleston in the championship game, 92–83, to capture the Patriots' first AIAW Division II national title.

== Format ==
Eight teams participated in a single-elimination tournament, a decrease in eight teams from the previous year's championship.

The tournament also included a third-place game for the two teams that lost in the semifinal games.

== Tournament bracket ==
First round
North Dakota State	w/o
Centenary
College of Charleston	96
FIU	44

Quarterfinals
Biola	71
North Dakota State	87
Livingston	48
College of Charleston	65

Semifinals
North Dakota State	73
College of Charleston	88
Francis Marion	84
William Penn	70

National championship
College of Charleston	83
Francis Marion	92
Third place
North Dakota State	76
William Penn	77

== See also ==
- 1982 AIAW National Division I Basketball Championship (final edition)
- 1982 AIAW National Division III Basketball Championship (final edition)
- 1982 NAIA women's basketball tournament
