= Francis Marion Patriots =

Intercollegiate sports teams of Francis Marion University

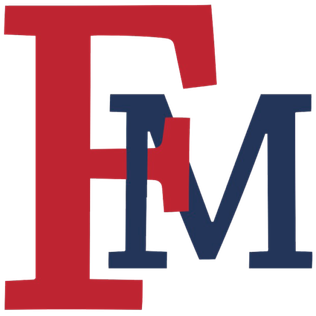
- University: Francis Marion University
- Nickname: Patriots
- NCAA: Division II; Division I (men's golf)
- Conference: Conference Carolinas (primary); Big Sky (men's golf)
- Athletic director: Quin Monahan
- Location: Florence, South Carolina
- Varsity teams: 15 (7 men's, 8 women's)
- Basketball arena: Smith University Center
- Baseball stadium: Sparrow Stadium
- Softball stadium: FMU Softball Stadium
- Soccer stadium: Hartzler Soccer Field
- Tennis venue: Kassab Tennis Courts
- Colors: Red, white, and blue
- Mascot: Frank the Fox
- Website: fmupatriots.com

Team NCAA championships
- 1

Individual and relay NCAA champions
- 2

The Francis Marion Patriots are the athletic teams that represent Francis Marion University, located in Florence, South Carolina, in intercollegiate sports at the Division II level of the National Collegiate Athletic Association (NCAA), primarily competing in Conference Carolinas since the 2021–22 academic year.

Francis Marion competes in fifteen intercollegiate varsity sports. Men's sports include baseball, basketball, cross country, golf, soccer, tennis, and track and field; while women's sports include acrobatics and tumbling, basketball, cross country, soccer, softball, tennis, track and field, and volleyball. Francis Marion's men's golf program competes at the Division I level; it became an affiliate member of the Big Sky Conference in July 2025 after four seasons as an affiliate member of the Southland Conference.

== Conference affiliations ==
NCAA

- Peach Belt Conference (1990–2021)
- Conference Carolinas (2021–present)

== Varsity teams ==
Men's sports	Women's sports
Baseball	Acrobatics and tumbling
Basketball	Basketball
Cross country	Cross country
Golf	Soccer
Soccer	Softball
Tennis	Tennis
Track and field	Track and field
	Volleyball

== National championships ==
=== Team ===
Association	Division	Sport	Year	Opponent/Runner-Up	Score
AIAW	Division II	Women's basketball	1982	College of Charleston	92–83
NAIA	No division	Women's basketball	1986	Wayland Baptist	75–65
NCAA	Division II	Men's golf	2003	Rollins	1,149–1,163

=== Individual ===
Association	Division	Sport	Year	Individual(s)	Event	Score
NCAA	Division II	Women's tennis	1993	Mary Hirst and Lee Whitwell	Women's Doubles	–
NCAA	Division II	Women's tennis	1994	Mary Hirst and Lee Whitwell	Women's Doubles	–
