= 1980 AIAW National Division I Basketball Championship =

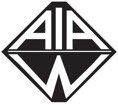

Tournament information
- Dates: March 12, 1980–March 23, 1980
- Administrator: Association for Intercollegiate Athletics for Women
- Host(s): Central Michigan University
- Venue(s): Mount Pleasant, Michigan
- Participants: 24

Final positions
- Champions: Old Dominion
- Runner-up: Tennessee

Tournament statistics
- Matches played: 23

The 1980 AIAW National Division I Basketball Championship was held on March 12–23, 1980. Twenty-four teams were invited, with eight teams receiving first round byes. First round games were played at on-campus locations. Old Dominion University was crowned national champion at the conclusion of the tournament, for the second straight season. The championship game was broadcast live on NBC.

The host site for the Final Four was Central Michigan University in Mount Pleasant, Michigan.

== Opening rounds ==
=== East Regional ===
First Round; March 12, 1980
Brigham Young	92
San Francisco	58
Rutgers	87
Central Missouri State	75

Second Round; March 16, 1980
Brigham Young	66
Old Dominion	88
Providence	54
Rutgers	70

Quarterfinals; March 17, 1980
Old Dominion	84
Rutgers	62

=== Central Regional ===
First Round; March 12, 1980
Cheyney State	66
Kansas	75
North Carolina State	70
Detroit	61

Second Round; March 15, 1980
Kansas	73
Louisiana Tech	81
Long Beach State	86
North Carolina State	72

Quarterfinals; March 18, 1980
Louisiana Tech	96
Long Beach State	70

=== South Regional ===
First Round; March 12, 1980
Kansas State	72
Boston	68
Texas	81
Mercer	80

Second Round; March 15, 1980
Kansas State	64
Tennessee	84
Maryland	68
Texas	63

Quarterfinals; March 18, 1980
Tennessee	93
Maryland	76

=== West Regional ===
First Round; March 12, 1980
Oregon	86
Kentucky	81
South Carolina	81
Southern California	60

Second Round; March 15, 1980
Oregon	53
Stephen F. Austin	76
Northwestern	61
South Carolina	64

Quarterfinals; March 18, 1980
Stephen F. Austin	56
South Carolina	63

=== Final Four – Mount Pleasant, MI ===
Semifinals; March 21, 1980
Old Dominion	73
Louisiana Tech	59
Tennessee	75
South Carolina	72

Final; March 23, 1980
Old Dominion	68
Tennessee	53
Third place
Louisiana Tech	69
South Carolina	77

== See also ==
- 1980 AIAW National Division II Basketball Championship
- 1980 AIAW National Division III Basketball Championship
