= Cal Poly Pomona Broncos women's basketball =

Cal Poly Pomona Broncos Women's Basketball
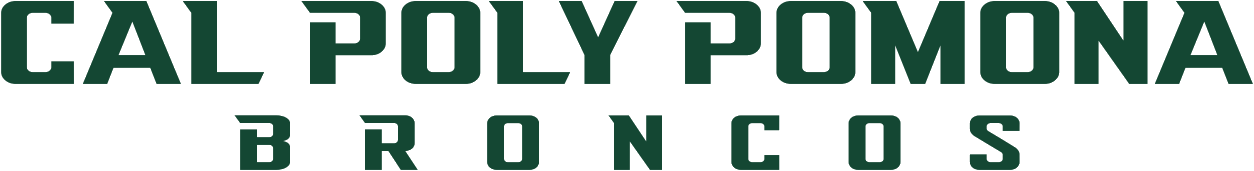
- University: California State Polytechnic University, Pomona
- Head coach: Danelle Bishop (15th season)
- Location: Pomona, California
- Arena: Kellogg Arena (capacity: 4,765)
- Conference: California Collegiate Athletic Association
- Nickname: Broncos
- Colors

NCAA Division I tournament champions
- 1982, 1985, 1986, 2001, 2002

NCAA Division I tournament runner-up
- 1983, 1987, 1989

NCAA Division I tournament Final Four
- 1982, 1983, 1985, 1986, 1987, 1989, 1990, 2001, 2002, 2014

NCAA Division I tournament Elite Eight
- 1982, 1983, 1985, 1986, 1987, 1988, 1989, 1990, 1991, 1993, 2001, 2002, 2011, 2014, 2026

NCAA Division I tournament Sweet Sixteen
- 1982, 1983, 1985, 1986, 1987, 1988, 1989, 1990, 1991, 1993, 2000, 2001, 2002, 2004, 2011, 2014, 2015, 2026

NCAA Division I tournament appearances
- 1982, 1983, 1984, 1985, 1986, 1987, 1988, 1989, 1990, 1991, 1992, 1993, 1997, 1998, 1999, 2000, 2001, 2002, 2004, 2005, 2010, 2011, 2012, 2014, 2015, 2019, 2020, 2023, 2024, 2025, 2026

AIAW tournament Final Four
- Division II: 1981
Other AIAW tournament results
Quarterfinals	Division II: 1977, 1980, 1981
Appearances	Division II: 1976, 1977, 1980, 1981

Conference tournament champions
- 1986, 1987, 1988, 1989, 1990, 1991, 1992, 1993, 1997, 1998, 2011

Conference regular-season champions
- 1977, 1978, 1979, 1980, 1981, 1982, 1983, 1984, 1985, 1986, 1987, 1988, 1989, 1990, 1991, 1992, 1993, 1994, 1997, 1998, 2000, 2001, 2002, 2014, 2026

The Cal Poly Pomona Broncos women's basketball team is the women's basketball team that represents California State Polytechnic University, Pomona, in Pomona, California. The school's team currently competes in the NCAA Division II California Collegiate Athletic Association.

== History ==
Cal Poly began play in 1974. They have appeared in the NCAA Division II women's basketball tournament 30 times, with a record of 57-23. They have won the Tournament five times while also finishing as runner up three times. They are tied with North Dakota State for the most Division II titles (5) and most title game appearances (8). They appeared in the first Division II title game in 1982, winning 93–74 over Tuskegee. From 1982 to 1989, they appeared in the Championship six times, each winning and losing thrice.

=== Season-by-season record ===
As of the end of the 2024-25 season, the Broncos have an all-time record of 1,062-412.

Season	Coach	Record	Conference Record
1974–75	Darlene May	16–6	n/a
1975–76	Darlene May	20–6	n/a
1976–77	Darlene May	28–6	10–0
1977–78	Darlene May	31–4	10–0
1978–79	Darlene May	24–7	10–0
1979–80	Darlene May	27–13	9–1
1980–81	Darlene May	30–9	12–0
1981–82	Darlene May	29–7	12–0
1982–83	Darlene May	29–3	11–0
1983–84	Darlene May	22–7	11–1
1984–85	Darlene May	26–7	11–1
1985–86	Darlene May	30–3	12–0
1986–87	Darlene May	29–3	11–1
1987–88	Darlene May	28–4	12–0
1988–89	Darlene May	28–6	11–1
1989–90	Darlene May	29–4	12–0
1990–91	Darlene May	22–9	11–1
1991–92	Darlene May	23–6	12–0
1992–93	Darlene May	27–3	11–1
1993–94	Darlene May	21–6	9–1
1994–95	Paul Thomas	10–15	3–7
1995–96	Paul Thomas	14–13	6–4
1996–97	Paul Thomas	22–8	8–2
1997–98	Paul Thomas	18–11	8–2
1998–99	Paul Thomas	23–6	16–4
1999–00	Paul Thomas	26–3	19–1
2000–01	Paul Thomas	27–3	20–2
2001–02	Paul Thomas	28–4	19–3
2002–03	Paul Thomas	13–14	11–11
2003–04	Paul Thomas	23–7	17–5
2004–05	Paul Thomas	20–8	15–5
2005–06	Paul Thomas	11–16	8–12
2006–07	Michelle Fortier	8–19	7–15
2007–08	Scott Davis	12–16	8–12
2008–09	Scott Davis	16–14	12–8
2009–10	Scott Davis	22–7	18–4
2010–11	Danelle Bishop	28–5	19–3
2011–12	Danelle Bishop	19–9	15–7
2012–13	Danelle Bishop	14–13	12–10
2013–14	Danelle Bishop	26–7	18–4
2014–15	Danelle Bishop	21–9	17–5
2015–16	Danelle Bishop	11–17	9–11
2016–17	Danelle Bishop	17–11	14–6
2017–18	Danelle Bishop	20–9	16–6
2018–19	Danelle Bishop	25–6	19–3
2019–20	Danelle Bishop	19–10	15–7
2020–21	Danelle Bishop	–	–
2021–22	Danelle Bishop	8–15	7–12
2022–23	Danelle Bishop	18–11	14–8
2023–24	Danelle Bishop	20–10	15–7
2024–25	Danelle Bishop	25–6	19–3

== Postseason ==
=== AIAW College Division/Division II ===
The Broncos made four appearances in the AIAW National Division II basketball tournament, with a combined record of 6–4.

Year	Round	Opponent	Result
1976	First Round	Phillips	L, 63–67
1977	First Round; Quarterfinals	Eastern Montana; Berry	W, 82–47; L, 66–86
1980	First Round; Second Round; Quarterfinals	Nebraska–Omaha; Arkansas Tech; Dayton	W, 79–64; W, 59–56; L, 79–88
1981	First Round; Quarterfinals; Semifinals; Third Place Game	William Carey; Louisiana College; College of Charleston; Lenoir-Rhyne	W, 83–65; W, 81–61; L, 84–102; W, 85–65

== NCAA Division II Championships ==
Association	Division	Sport	Year	Score	Opponent
NCAA	Division II	Basketball	1982	93–74	Tuskegee
NCAA	Division II	Basketball	1985	80–69	Central Missouri State
NCAA	Division II	Basketball	1986	70–63	North Dakota State
NCAA	Division II	Basketball	2001	87–80 (OT)	North Dakota
NCAA	Division II	Basketball	2002	74–62	Southeastern Oklahoma

NCAA Division II runner-up teams:

- 1983
- 1987
- 1989
