= San Francisco State Gators =

Athletic teams of San Francisco State University

- University: San Francisco State University
- Nickname: Gators
- NCAA: Division II
- Conference: CCAA (primary); MPSF (men's wrestling)
- President: Dr. Lynn Mahoney
- Athletic director: Brandon Davis
- Location: San Francisco, California
- Varsity teams: 10 (4 men's, 6 women's)
- Basketball arena: San Francisco Federal Credit Union Gymnasium at Don Nasser Family Plaza
- Softball stadium: SFSU Softball Field
- Soccer stadium: Cox Stadium
- Colors: Purple and gold
- Fight song: "State Victory Song"
- Website: sfstategators.com

Team NCAA championships
- 1

Individual and relay NCAA champions
- 20

The San Francisco State Gators are the athletic teams that compete at San Francisco State University in San Francisco, California. The nickname applies to the college's intercollegiate NCAA Division II teams. The nickname was published in the student newspaper, "The Leaf", but was long referred to in media alternatively as the "Staters" and the "Golden Gaters". The use of Gaters eventually evolved into the Gators as known today.

The Gators have had a total of 275 athletes earn All-American honors, 34 athletes earn Academic All-American honors and 14 Gators earn an individual national title in their respective sport.

Most teams compete in the California Collegiate Athletic Association, except for wrestling, which competes in the Mountain Pacific Sports Federation. The university also offers a number of club sports.

== Sports sponsored ==
Men's sports	Women's sports
Basketball	Basketball
Cross country	Cross country
Track and field (Distance)	Soccer
Wrestling	Softball
	Track and field (Distance)
	Volleyball

=== Basketball ===
In 2016–17, the men's basketball team advanced to the NCAA Division II National Championships for the first time since the 1993–94 season. The Gators won 25 games, were ranked as high as No. 13, and finished ranked No. 22 in the nation. Junior guard Warren Jackson was named a D2 Bulletin All-American Honorable Mention.

In the late 1970s and early 80s, the women's basketball team had a string of nine straight postseason appearances.

=== Soccer ===
The women's soccer team reached the NCAA postseason in 2002, 2008, and 2010.

The men's soccer team matched its best start in program history in 2017 with a 5–0 start and advanced to the postseason for the first time since 1978. The Gators discontinued men's soccer in 2025.

=== Softball ===
The softball team was established in 1977 and saw a dominant program in 2004, 2005, and 2006. The Gators reached the NCAA postseason all three seasons. The 2005 team advanced to the NCAA Division II National Championships and finished with a 42-21 record, led by pitcher Sonja Garnett's 30 wins. The Gators returned to the postseason in 2019 but saw the 2020 and 2021 seasons canceled due to the pandemic. The 2025 squad had another dominant season with a record of 39-20. That team won the CCAA Tournament and hosted the NCAA Division II West Regional, both program firsts.

=== Track and field ===
In 2019, San Francisco State reopened the men's track and field program after 15 years of discontinuation.

In 2018, the San Francisco State women's track & field team captured the program's first-ever CCAA Championship. Atiya Harvey and Destiny Mack-Talalemotu were named All-Americans during the 2018 indoor season.

At the 2017 NCAA Division II Outdoor Track and Field Championships, the quartet of Atiya Harvey, Vanessa Koontz, Kennedy Hardemion, and Timarya Baynard ran a time of 3:37.80, the second fastest time in program history, and captured the National Championship in the 4x400. Additionally, Baynard finished the 400m in sixth place with a time of 54.18 to earn All-American honors. Harvey also earned individual All-American honors in the 200m dash with a fourth-place finish and time of 23.75.

At the 2017 NCAA Division II Indoor Track and Field Championships on Saturday, March 11 at the Birmingham CrossPlex, the SF State 4x400 relay team garnered All-American Honors, taking sixth place with a time of 3:44.58.

In 2014, Tiana Wills earned All-American honors in the high jump at the 2014 NCAA Division II Indoor Track and Field Championships.

The women's track and field team won back-to-back CCAA Championships in 2018 and 2019.

=== Women's volleyball ===
The program made its first NCAA postseason appearance in 1987. The program went on a brief hiatus after the 2003 season before returning in 2008. The Gators wasted little time with a 2009 NCAA West Regional appearance and another one in 2012. The Gators' recent success saw the 2023 squad reach the postseason yet again and the 2024 team made its mark with a historic run. That team went 26-7, won the NCAA Division II West Regional, and finished as the National Runner-Up. Three-time CCAA Setter of the Year Kimberly DeBoer was named a 2025 Top 30 NCAA Woman of the Year Honoree.

=== Wrestling ===
Wrestling competes in the Mountain Pacific Sports Federation, which started a Division II men's wrestling league in 2024-25. Previously, the Gators had housed that sport in the Rocky Mountain Athletic Conference. With the announcement of California Baptist moving to NCAA Division I, SF State became the only Division II wrestling program in California. Since then, Cal Poly Humboldt, Menlo, and Vanguard have joined the MPSF alongside SF State. The wrestling program has seen success over the years, having sent a qualifier to the NCAA Division II National Championships from 1965 to 2017. In 1997, Head Coach Lars Jensen led the first-ever NCAA Division II national championship team at SF State. Under current Head Coach Jason Welch, the Gators have captured an individual championship in 2025 and sent three qualifiers in 2026 with another All-American.

=== Baseball (Retired) ===
San Francisco State Baseball was discontinued at the conclusion of the 2025 season. The program dated back to the 1930s when the program was coached by Hal Harden with a "record-breaking" season in 1938 according to the Berkeley Daily Gazette. Maloney Field, which opened in 1984, saw extensive upgrades ahead of the 2017 season that included field work including the construction of a new pitcher's mound, new windscreens, and the installation of new foul poles. The 2018 team made the program's first-ever CCAA Championships appearance. The Gators made NCAA Division II West Regional Appearances in 2024 and 2025.

=== Football (Retired) ===
San Francisco State fielded a football program from 1931 until it was discontinued in 1994. The SF State Men's Football team were Far Western Conference Champions in '51, '54, '56, '57, '58, '59, '62, '63, '65, and 1967. Under Head Coach Vic Rowen from 1961-1989, the Gators produced a coaching tree that includes Andy Reid, Dirk Koetter, Mike Holmgren, Tom Melvin, and Bob Toledo.

== Championships ==
=== Appearances ===
The San Francisco State Gators competed in the NCAA Tournament across 11 active sports (5 men's and 6 women's) 113 times at the Division II level.

- Baseball (7): 1979, 1981, 1982, 1983, 1989, 1995, 2024, 2025
- Men's basketball (10): 1960, 1963, 1965, 1969, 1971, 1980, 1982, 1983, 1994, 2017
- Women's basketball (4): 1982, 1983, 1984, 1985
- Men's cross country (1): 2012
- Men's soccer (3): 1972, 1977, 1978
- Women's soccer (3): 2002, 2008, 2010
- Softball (5): 2004, 2005, 2006, 2019, 2025
- Women's indoor track and field (9): 2001, 2011, 2012, 2013, 2014, 2017, 2018, 2019, 2020 (canceled due to COVID-19)
- Women's outdoor track and field (20): 1982, 1984, 1986, 1988, 1990, 1991, 1995, 2000, 2001, 2004, 2008, 2009, 2010, 2011, 2012, 2013, 2014, 2017, 2018, 2019
- Women's volleyball (5): 1987, 2009, 2012, 2023, 2024
- Wrestling (56): 1967, 1968, 1969, 1970, 1971, 1972, 1973, 1974, 1975, 1976, 1977, 1978, 1979, 1980, 1981, 1982, 1983, 1984, 1985, 1986, 1987, 1988, 1989, 1990, 1991, 1992, 1993, 1994, 1995, 1996, 1997, 1998, 1999, 2000, 2001, 2002, 2003, 2004, 2005, 2006, 2008, 2009, 2010, 2011, 2012, 2013, 2014, 2015, 2016, 2018, 2019, 2020 (canceled due to COVID-19), 2022, 2024, 2025, 2026

=== Team ===
The Gators of San Francisco State earned 1 NCAA team championship at the Division II level.

- Men's (1)
  - Wrestling (1): 1997

Results

School year	Sport	Opponent	Score
1996–97	Wrestling	Omaha	95–81

Below is one national club team championship:

- Women's judo (1): 1988 (NCJA)

=== Individual ===
San Francisco State had 19 Gators win NCAA individual championships at the Division II level.

NCAA individual championships
Order	School year	Athlete(s)	Sport	Source
1	1964–65	Jim Burke	Wrestling	
2	1973–74	Bob Parker	Men's outdoor track and field	
3	1974–75	Alex Gonzales	Wrestling	
4	1974–75	Lloyd Teasley	Wrestling	
5	1981–82	Cindy Lazzarino	Women's gymnastics	
6	1982–83	Cindy Lazzarino	Women's gymnastics	
7	1982–83	Cindy Lazzarino	Women's gymnastics	
8	1983–84	Morris Johnson	Wrestling	
9	1985–86	Steve Koel	Men's outdoor track and field	
10	1989–90	Matt Blevin	Wrestling	
11	1996–97	Damon Broadbent	Wrestling	
12	1996–97	Greg Jackson	Wrestling	
13	1996–97	Lee Lofton	Wrestling	
14	1999–00	Terry Tuzzulino	Wrestling	
15	2001–02	Mauricio Wright	Wrestling	
16	2002–03	Mauricio Wright	Wrestling	
17	2004–05	Pacifico Garcia	Wrestling	
18	2012–13	Naveed Bagheri	Wrestling	
19	2016–17	Atiya Harvey; Vanessa Koontz; Kennedy Hardemion; Timarya Baynard	Women's outdoor track and field	
20	2025	Johnny Lopez	Wrestling	

== Club sports ==
=== Rugby ===
San Francisco State has fielded a co-ed club rugby side, the Gators Rugby Football Club, founded in 2005. The Gators side hope to be accepted into the Northern California Rugby Football Union division, needing to play every weekend with a full team, receive a unanimous vote in by all coaches in the division in order to be brought in. After meeting all the requirements thus far, with a current record of 16–2 this season, the side is expecting to be inducted into the Division II NCRFU. After a long effort to achieve activation through affiliation with the university as a club sport, competing at Ocean View Park, both the men's and women's sides were able to attain affiliation by 2009. The student-run clubs compete against both university and non-university sides, including the SF Fog, St. Mary's, USF, and Santa Clara.

=== Sailing ===
In the 1980s, SFSU had a Sailing team that consisted of two Flying Junior FJ Collegiate racing boats made by Vanguard. The boats were kept on a trailer in the "Corp Yard", behind the arts building.

SFSU sailed as a member of the Pacific Coast Collegiate Sailing Conference

Sailing at SFSU was recognized as a "club sport". However the team was eligible to compete at the varsity level with other schools in the area and enjoyed strong representation from 1983 to 1988. Collegiate racing at the time had a rule that to race two boats in Varsity, one skipper had to be female. SFSU had a rotation of female skippers throughout the mid-1980s racing seasons.

SFSU participated in the "Northern Series" which included racing against UC Berkeley, California State University Maritime Academy, Stanford University, Sonoma State University, California Polytechnic State University, and UC Davis.
