= Immaculata University =

Catholic university in East Whiteland Township, Pennsylvania, US

Coordinates: 40.02899°N 75.57169°W

- Former names: Villa Maria College (1920–1929); Immaculata College (1929–2002)
- Motto: Scientia Floret Virtute
- Motto in English: Knowledge Flourishes in Virtue
- Type: Private university
- Established: 1920; 106 years ago
- Religious affiliation: Roman Catholic (Sisters, Servants of the Immaculate Heart of Mary)
- Academic affiliations: Conference for Mercy Higher Education; ACCU; CIC; NAICU
- President: Barbara Lettiere
- Faculty: 80 (FT)
- Students: 2,532 (fall 2024)
- Undergraduates: 1,652 (fall 2024)
- Postgraduates: 880 (fall 2024)
- Location: East Whiteland Township, Pennsylvania, U.S.
- Campus: Small town, c. 300 acres (120 ha)
- Colors: Blue, white
- Nickname: The Mighty Macs
- Sporting affiliations: NCAA Division III – Atlantic East
- Mascot: Mac the Scottish Terrier
- Website: immaculata.edu

Immaculata University is a private Catholic university in East Whiteland Township, Pennsylvania, United States. It was founded by the Sisters, Servants of the Immaculate Heart of Mary.

The university has 1,427 traditional undergraduate and adult undergraduate students, and more than 1,000 graduate and doctoral students. The university is located on more than 300 acres (120 ha).

== History ==
Immaculata was founded as Villa Maria College, a women's college, in 1920. It was the first Catholic college for women in the Philadelphia area. The name was changed to Immaculata College in 1929.

Founded by the Sisters, Servants of the Immaculate Heart of Mary, Immaculata is part of the greater IHM community, which includes the neighboring House of Studies and an academy for girls (now split into two campuses, Lower School and High School). The university became co-educational in the fall of 2005.

The current location of Immaculata University is in the Great Valley region of Chester County, Pennsylvania, near the Philadelphia Main Line community of Malvern, purchased by the sisters in 1906. The original 198-acre (0.80 km^{2}) plot has grown to 373 acres (1.51 km^{2}) since that time.

In June 2002, Immaculata College received confirmation of university status from the Pennsylvania Department of Education. Effective August 2002, the college is now known as Immaculata University.

Barbara Lettiere assumed the office as the tenth president of Immaculata University on July 1, 2017, and is the first lay president of Immaculata.

== Campus ==
The following buildings are located on campus:

Alumnae Hall was named in honor of Immaculata University alumnae. This building contains a gymnasium, fitness center, and a theater.

The Mary A. Bruder Center focuses on Campus Health Services (nurses) and Counseling Services.

The DeChantal and Marian halls are a residential complex containing 154 residential rooms with kitchenettes on most floors, student and study lounges, and laundry facilities, as well as a chapel.

The Faculty Center contains faculty and administrative offices of the college of undergraduate studies.

The three-storied Gabriele Library contains computers and study rooms and houses the writing center and archives along with a coffee shop on the first level, which is called the ImmacuLatte.

Gillet Hall contains the faculty residences, mainly occupied by the IHM Sisters. The building is named after Father Louis Gillet.

Good Counsel Hall was the university's first main classroom building. It contains a bookstore, humanities department, and music listening rooms. The Lillian P. Lettiere Center houses financial aid and admissions and also the Esports arena. Lourdes Hall, attached to Villa Maria Hall, serves as a residential hall with 60 residential rooms and also contains Great Hall for large events and functions.

Loyola Hall is the university's second main classroom building and contains administrative offices—College of Graduate Studies, nursing and allied health sciences, amphitheaters, art, education, mathematics, psychology, science departments, computer centers, curriculum library, laboratories, and math center.

Nazareth Hall includes the main cafeteria and the campus chapel. Classrooms are also located in this building for fashion and nutrition majors. In the year 2000, air conditioning, heating, and sprinkler systems were installed.

Villa Maria Hall, with its Italian Renaissance architecture, is a beautiful building capped by a dome. Villa Maria is the principal building of the Immaculata University campus. Ballinger & Perrot designed this building, along with Nazareth Hall. With the vision of the IHM Sisters, Villa Maria Hall was placed between Harrisburg and Philadelphia in order to have a convenient location to build a college for women. It was opened in 1914. In the year 2000, Villa Maria had renovations done. Air conditioning, heating, and sprinkler systems were added to the building. Immaculata events such as Carol Night, Ring Ceremony, Pinning Ceremony, Homecoming, and others are held in this building. The third floor contains a residence hall, while offices are located on the first and second floors. Immaculata University had a post office with a ZIP code of 19345, which is now closed.

Opened in Fall 2022, the Parsons Science Pavilion is a 15,000-square-foot (1,400 m^{2}), state-of-the-art facility designed to support science and health-related education. Funded by $6.5 million in donations, primarily from the Parsons Family, the building features advanced laboratories and equipment, including seven wet labs, a computer lab, faculty offices, and collaborative spaces. Highlights include cutting-edge tools such as an Anatomage Table, PCR/DNA Amplifier, and Nuclear Magnetic Resonance Spectrometer. The pavilion enhances hands-on learning in biology, anatomy, and environmental science, preparing students for careers in STEM and healthcare.

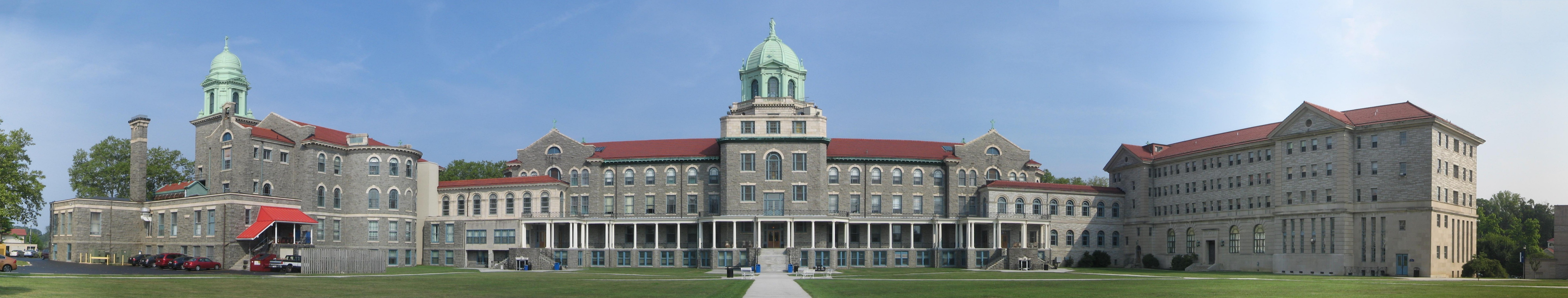
Panoramic view of Nazareth Hall (left), Villa Maria Hall (center), and Lourdes Hall (right) at Immaculata University

== Academics ==
Immaculata University is accredited by the Middle States Commission on Higher Education. In 2026 it was ranked No. 1 on SmartAsset's list of "America's Best Value Small Colleges and Universities".

== Student life ==
The Immaculata Leadership Institute is a program which develops religious leadership.

Students can join over 35 clubs and organizations, including:

- Campus Ministry – students engage in volunteer and fundraising work to help those less fortunate.
- English/Communications Club
- IU Gamers' Guild
- Garden Club
- Cue and Curtain Theater
- African-American Cultural Society
- Latin Flavor
- Fashion Group
- Catholic Relief Services Student Ambassadors

=== Media ===
The Immaculatan is the student newspaper published with funds from the college of undergraduate studies.

The Immaculata Magazine is published twice a year by the staff of University Communications.

== Athletics ==
Immaculata Mighty Macs logo

Immaculata's athletics teams are nicknamed the Mighty Macs. The university competes in the Atlantic East Conference of NCAA Division III.

The university competed in the Colonial States Athletic Conference (CSAC) through 2017–18.

The women's basketball team played in six straight AIAW basketball tournament final fours from 1972 to 1977, five straight finals from 1972 to 1976. They won three consecutive national championships from 1972 to 1974. The team was featured for its 1970s accomplishments on a SportsCenter special on March 23, 2008.

Men's sports	Women's sports
Baseball	Basketball
Basketball	Cross country
Cross country	Field hockey
Lacrosse	Flag football
Soccer	Lacrosse
Swimming	Soccer
Tennis	Softball
Track and field^{1}	Swimming
Volleyball	Track and field^{1}
	Volleyball
Co-ed sports
Esports
^{1} – includes both indoor and outdoor

On January 26, 1975, Immaculata played in the first nationally televised women's intercollegiate basketball game. Facing Maryland at Cole Field House, Immaculata won 80–48 in a game noted more for its turnovers (70) than scoring (56 field goals, 16 free throws).

On February 22, 1975, they played in the first women's college basketball game ever played in Madison Square Garden. Immaculata won 65–61. On January 4, 2015, Immaculata and Queens College played in the Maggie Dixon Classic as a commemoration of the 40th anniversary of the first game played between women's college basketball teams in Madison Square Garden.

The story of the basketball team was adapted into a movie, The Mighty Macs, which was released in 2011. Directed by Tim Chambers, the film chronicles the first Mighty Macs championship in 1972.

The head coach of the women's team from 1972 to 1977, Cathy Rush, was inducted into the Naismith Memorial Basketball Hall of Fame in 2008, and the Women's Basketball Hall of Fame in 2010. The 1972–1974 teams were announced on April 7, 2014, as part of the 2014 induction class of the Naismith Hall, and were formally inducted as a team on August 8. Players Theresa Grentz and Marianne Stanley were inducted into the Naismith Hall in 2022 for their subsequent accomplishments as college coaches.

=== Venues ===
- Draper Walsh Stadium (Sprint turf surface) for field hockey, lacrosse, and soccer – 1,000 capacity
- IU Softball Field (grass)
- IU Baseball Stadium (grass) – 600 capacity

There is a Student-Athlete Advisory Committee (SAAC) which encourages athletics.

== Alumni ==
- Megan Brennan 1984, first woman to serve as United States Postmaster General
- Mary Pat Clarke 1963, first woman to serve as president of the Baltimore City Council
- Theresa Grentz 1974, college basketball athlete and coach and member of the Women's Basketball Hall of Fame
- E. Gail de Planque 1967, nuclear physicist and first woman to serve as a commissioner of the Nuclear Regulatory Commission
- Rene Portland 1975, college basketball athlete and coach for the Penn State Nittany Lions for 27 years
- Eileen M. Rehrmann 1997, Maryland state legislator and Harford County executive
- Marianne Stanley 1976, athlete and 1984-1985 NCAA Women's Division I Basketball Championship coach
