= Big South Conference women's basketball tournament =

Basketball tournament

Big South women's basketball tournament
- Conference basketball championship
- Sport: Basketball
- Conference: Big South Conference
- Number of teams: 10
- Format: Single-elimination tournament
- Played: 1986–present
- Current champion: High Point (3rd)
- Most championships: Liberty (17)
- Official website: Big South Women's Basketball

The Big South Conference women's basketball tournament is the conference championship tournament in women's basketball for the Big South Conference. It is a single-elimination tournament involving all of the 10 league schools, and seeding is based on regular-season records with head-to-head match-up as a tie-breaker. The winner receives the conference's automatic bid to the NCAA women's basketball tournament.

In the first round, the #7 seed faces off against the #10 and the #8 faces off against the #9. The #1 and #2 seeds play the winner of those games in the quarterfinals, while the #3 seed faces off against the #6 seed and the #4 seed faces off against the #5 seed.

The tournament has been held since 1986.

== Results ==
Big South Conference women's basketball tournament
Year	Champions	Score	Runner-up	Venue
1987	Radford (1)	71–59	Campbell	Dedmon Center (Radford, VA)
1988	Radford (2)	100–81	Campbell	Carter Gymnasium (Buies Creek, NC)
1989	Campbell (1)	58–53	Radford	Dedmon Center (Radford, VA)
1990	Radford (3)	69–65	Campbell	Justice Center (Asheville, NC)
1991	Radford (4)	65–64	Campbell	Dedmon Center (Radford, VA)
1992	Radford (5)	85–77	Campbell	Dedmon Center (Radford, VA)
1993	Radford (6)	62–57	UNC Greensboro	Dedmon Center (Radford, VA)
1994	Radford (7)	83–78	UNC Greensboro	Spectator Gymnasium (Greensboro, NC)
1995	Radford (8)	68–63	UNC Greensboro	Dedmon Center (Radford, VA)
1996	Radford (9)	85–83	Winthrop	Dedmon Center (Radford, VA)
1997	Liberty (1)	89–82	UNC Greensboro	Vines Center (Lynchburg, VA)
1998	Liberty (2)	65–53	UNC Asheville	Vines Center (Lynchburg, VA)
1999	Liberty (3)	68–55	Coastal Carolina	Asheville Civic Center (Asheville, NC)
2000	Liberty (4)	74–64	Coastal Carolina	Asheville Civic Center (Asheville, NC)
2001	Liberty (5)	52–47	Elon	Roanoke Civic Center (Roanoke, VA)
2002	Liberty (6)	57–33	Coastal Carolina	Roanoke Civic Center (Roanoke, VA)
2003	Liberty (7)	84–71	High Point	Vines Center (Lynchburg, VA)
2004	Liberty (8)	54–41	Birmingham-Southern	Vines Center (Lynchburg, VA)
2005	Liberty (9)	88–41	UNC Asheville	Vines Center (Lynchburg, VA)
2006	Liberty (10)	53–50	High Point	Vines Center (Lynchburg, VA)
2007	UNC Asheville (1)	67–57	Radford	Justice Center (Asheville, NC)
2008	Liberty (11)	66–65	Radford	Justice Center (Asheville, NC)
2009	Liberty (12)	51–50	Gardner–Webb	Millis Center (High Point, NC)
2010	Liberty (13)	68–66	Gardner–Webb	Millis Center (High Point, NC)
2011	Gardner–Webb (1)	67–66	Liberty	Millis Center (High Point, NC)
2012	Liberty (14)	81–73	High Point	Millis Center (High Point, NC)
2013	Liberty (15)	54–45	Longwood	HTC Center (Conway, SC)
2014	Winthrop (1)	87–74	High Point	HTC Center (Conway, SC)
2015	Liberty (16)	74–64	High Point	HTC Center (Conway, SC)
2016	UNC Asheville (2)	64–62 (OT)	Liberty	Kimmel Arena (Asheville, NC)
2017	UNC Asheville (3)	49–48	Radford	Vines Center (Lynchburg, VA)
2018	Liberty (17)	60–42	UNC Asheville	Vines Center (Lynchburg, VA)
2019	Radford (10)	57–45	Campbell	Dedmon Center (Radford, VA)
2020	Cancelled due to the COVID-19 pandemic.			
2021	High Point (1)	62–46	Campbell	Millis Center (High Point, NC)
2022	Longwood (1)	86–47	Campbell	Bojangles Coliseum (Charlotte, NC)
2023	Gardner-Webb (2)	74–61	High Point	Bojangles Coliseum (Charlotte, NC)
2024	Presbyterian (1)	60–37	Radford	Qubein Center (High Point, NC)
2025	High Point (2)	59–53	Longwood	Freedom Hall Civic Center (Johnson City, TN)
2026	High Point (3)	71–67	Radford	Freedom Hall Civic Center (Johnson City, TN)

== Champions ==
School	Championships	Championship Years
Liberty	17	1997, 1998, 1999, 2000, 2001, 2002, 2003, 2004, 2005, 2006, 2008, 2009, 2010, 2012, 2013, 2015, 2018
Radford	10	1987, 1988, 1990, 1991, 1992, 1993, 1994, 1995, 1996, 2019
High Point	3	2021, 2025, 2026
UNC Asheville	3	2007, 2016, 2017
Gardner–Webb	2	2011, 2023
Campbell	1	1989
Longwood	1	2022
Presbyterian	1	2024
Winthrop	1	2014

- Charleston Southern and USC Upstate have not yet won a Big South tournament.
- Armstrong State, Augusta State, Birmingham-Southern, Davidson, Elon, Hampton, North Carolina A&T, Towson, UMBC, and UNC Greensboro never won the tournament as Big South members.
- Schools highlighted in pink are former Big South members.

== See also ==
- Big South Conference men's basketball tournament
