= 2022 Big South Conference women's basketball tournament =

American basketball competition

- Classification: Division I
- Season: 2021–22
- Teams: 12
- Site: Bojangles Coliseum; Charlotte, North Carolina
- Television: ESPN+, ESPNU

The 2022 Big South Conference women's basketball tournament was the postseason women's basketball tournament for the Big South Conference for the 2021–22 season. It was held from March 1–6, 2022 with all tournament games played at the Bojangles Coliseum in Charlotte, North Carolina. This was the first time since the 2016 edition that the tournament has been held at a single neutral site location. The tournament winner receives the conference's automatic bid to the NCAA tournament. The defending champions are the High Point Panthers.

2021–22 Big South women's basketball standings
	Conf.				Overall
Team	W		L	PCT	W		L	PCT
Campbell	15	–	3	.833	23	–	8	.742
Longwood †	15	–	3	.833	22	–	12	.647
USC Upstate	14	–	4	.778	22	–	8	.733
Gardner–Webb	13	–	5	.722	16	–	15	.516
High Point	13	–	5	.722	17	–	14	.548
North Carolina A&T	11	–	7	.611	14	–	15	.483
Hampton	8	–	9	.471	13	–	16	.448
Presbyterian	6	–	12	.333	12	–	18	.400
Winthrop	4	–	14	.222	6	–	24	.200
UNC Asheville	3	–	15	.167	10	–	22	.313
Radford	3	–	15	.167	7	–	23	.233
Charleston Southern	2	–	15	.118	2	–	27	.069
† 2022 Big South tournament winner

== Seeds ==
With the addition of North Carolina A&T before the season, the conference increased its membership to 12 teams and split into divisions for the first time since 2013–14. The division winners were awarded the top two seeds, with the rest of the teams being seeded by record, with a tiebreaker system to seed teams with identical conference records.

The tiebreakers operate in the following order:

1. Head-to-head record.
2. Record against the top-ranked conference team not involved in the tie, going down the standings until the tie is broken. For this purpose, teams with the same conference record are considered collectively. If two teams were unbeaten or winless against an opponent but did not play the same number of games against that opponent, the tie is not considered broken.

Seed	School	Conference	Tiebreaker
1	Campbell	15–3	2–0 vs. Longwood
2	Longwood	15–3	0–2 vs. Campbell
3	USC Upstate	14–4	
4	Gardner–Webb	13–5	2–0 vs. High Point
5	High Point	13–5	0–2 vs. Gardner-Webb
6	North Carolina A&T	11–7	
7	Hampton	8–9	
8	Presbyterian	6–12	
9	Winthrop	4–14	
10	Radford	3–15	1–1 vs. Winthrop
11	UNC Asheville	3–15	0–1 vs. Winthrop
12	Charleston Southern	2–15	

== Schedule ==
Game	Time*	Matchup	Score	Channel
First round - Tuesday, March 1 Bojangles Coliseum Charlotte, NC
1	Noon	#8 Presbyterian vs. #9 Winthrop	65–60	ESPN+
2	2:00 pm	#5 High Point vs. #12 Charleston Southern	54–34	ESPN+
3	6:00 pm	#7 Hampton vs. #10 Radford	55–49	ESPN+
4	8:00 pm	#11 UNC Asheville vs. #6 North Carolina A&T	68–59	ESPN+
Quarterfinals - Thursday, March 3 Bojangles Coliseum
5	12:00 pm	#1 Campbell vs. #8 Presbyterian	59–56	ESPN+
6	2:00 pm	#4 Gardner-Webb vs. #5 High Point	55–53	ESPN+
7	6:00 pm	#2 Longwood vs. #7 Hampton	70–61	ESPN+
8	8:00 pm	#3 USC Upstate vs. #11 UNC Asheville	57–62	ESPN+
Semifinals - Saturday, March 5 Bojangles Coliseum
9	6:00 pm	#1 Campbell vs. #4 Gardner-Webb	51–50	ESPN+
10	8:00 pm	#2 Longwood vs. #11 UNC Asheville	81–56	ESPN+
Championship - Sunday, March 6 Bojangles Coliseum
11	6:00 pm	#1 Campbell vs. #2 Longwood	47–86	ESPNU
*Game times in ET

== Bracket ==
First round Tuesday, March 1 ESPN+
8	Presbyterian	65
9	Winthrop	60
5	High Point	54
12	Charleston Southern	34
7	Hampton	55
10	Radford	49
6	North Carolina A&T	59
11	UNC Asheville	68

Quarterfinals; Thursday, March 3 ESPN+
1	Campbell	59*
8	Presbyterian	56
4	Gardner-Webb	55
5	High Point	53
2	Longwood	70
7	Hampton	61
3	USC Upstate	57
11	UNC Asheville	62

Semifinals; Saturday, March 5 ESPN+
1	Campbell	51
4	Gardner-Webb	50
2	Longwood	81
11	UNC Asheville	56

Finals; Sunday, March 6 ESPNU
1	Campbell	47
2	Longwood	86
