= 2018–19 High Point Panthers women's basketball team =

Intercollegiate basketball season

2018–19 High Point Panthers women's basketball

WNIT, First Round
- Conference: Big South Conference
- Record: 22–9 (15–3 Big South)
- Head coach: DeUnna Hendrix (7th season)
- Assistant coaches: Heather Kearney; Jenna Burkett; Hailey Yohn
- Home arena: Millis Athletic Center

2018–19 Big South women's basketball standings
	Conf.				Overall
Team	W		L	PCT	W		L	PCT
Radford †	17	–	1	.944	26	–	6	.813
High Point	15	–	3	.833	22	–	8	.733
Hampton	12	–	6	.667	16	–	14	.533
UNC Asheville	11	–	7	.611	17	–	13	.567
Campbell	10	–	8	.556	20	–	12	.625
Gardner-Webb	10	–	8	.556	16	–	15	.516
Charleston Southern	9	–	9	.500	14	–	17	.452
Winthrop	6	–	12	.333	10	–	20	.333
Presbyterian	4	–	14	.222	7	–	24	.226
USC Upstate	3	–	15	.167	7	–	23	.233
Longwood	2	–	16	.111	3	–	26	.103
† 2019 Big South tournament winner As of March 14, 2019; Rankings from AP poll

The 2018–19 High Point Panthers women's basketball team represented High Point University during the 2018–19 NCAA Division I women's basketball season. The Panthers, led by seventh-year head coach DeUnna Hendrix, played their home games at the Millis Athletic Convocation Center as members of the Big South Conference. They finished the season 22–9, 15–3 in Big South play to finish in second place. They lost in the quarterfinals of the Big South women's tournament to Charleston Southern. They received an automatic bid to the WNIT, where they lost to Ohio in the first round

== Previous season ==
The 2017-18 team finished the season 17–14, 10–8 in Big South play to finish in fourth place. They advanced to the semifinals of the Big South women's tournament where they lost 78-54 to eventual champion Liberty.

== Off-season ==
=== Departures ===
Name	Number	Pos.	Height	Year	Hometown	Reason
Kennedy Currie	24	F	6'0"	Senior	Greensboro, NC	Graduated
Kat Harris	1	G	5'7"	Senior	Charlotte, NC	Graduated
Haleigh Hatfield	0	F	6'1"	Junior	Winston-Salem, NC	Transferred (UC San Diego)
Taylor McGlashan	11	F	6'2"	Junior	Marlton, NJ	Graduated
Jiselle Thomas	30	F	5'9"	Freshman	Norwalk, OH	Transferred (FIU)

=== Recruits ===
College recruiting information
Name	Hometown	School	Height	Weight	Commit date
Skyler Curran; G	Clemmons, NC	West Forsyth	6 ft 0 in (1.83 m)	N/A	Nov 9, 2017
Skyler Curran; G	Recruit ratings: No ratings found				
Jenson Edwards; G	Wilmington, NC	E.A. Laney	5 ft 8 in (1.73 m)	N/A	Nov 9, 2017
Jenson Edwards; G	Recruit ratings: No ratings found				
Mikaela Johnson; F	Mount Airy, NC	North Surry	6 ft 0 in (1.83 m)	N/A	Nov 9, 2017
Mikaela Johnson; F	Recruit ratings: No ratings found				
Overall recruit ranking:
Note: In many cases, Scout, Rivals, 247Sports, On3, and ESPN may conflict in their listings of height and weight.; In these cases, the average was taken. ESPN grades are on a 100-point scale.; Sources: "2018 Player Commits". ESPN. Archived from the original on September 13, 2018.

=== Transfers ===
- note: Miya Bull and Bria Gibson are eligible for the 2018-19 season

Name	Number	Pos.	Height	Year	Hometown	High School	Previous College
Miya Bull	23	F	5'11"	Junior	Charlotte, NC	East Meck	Iowa Western Community College
Zaria Wright	25	G	5'8"	Sophomore	Concord, NC	First Assembly	Toledo
Bria Gibson	32	F	6'1"	Senior	Columbia, MD	Sanderson	VCU
Danielle Deoul	33	F	6'2"	Sophomore	Washingtonville, NY	Immaculate Conception	George Mason

== Roster ==
2018–19 High Point Panthers women's basketball team
Players
Coaches

Pos.	#	Name	Height	Year	Previous school	Hometown
G	2	Camryn Brown (C)	5 ft 5 in (1.65 m)	Jr	Revere	Copley, Ohio
G	4	Bre Davis	5 ft 6 in (1.68 m)	RS Sr	Seventy-First	Fayetteville, North Carolina
G	10	Emma Bockrath	5 ft 10 in (1.78 m)	Sr	Kettering Alter	Dayton, Ohio
G	12	Jenson Edwards (redshirt)	5 ft 8 in (1.73 m)	Fr	E.A. Laney	Wilmington, North Carolina
G	13	Skyler Curran	6 ft 0 in (1.83 m)	Fr	West Forsyth	Clemmons, North Carolina
F	14	Shea Morgan	6 ft 0 in (1.83 m)	Sr	Fairmont	Kettering, Ohio
G	21	Lindsey Edwards	5 ft 10 in (1.78 m)	Sr	Roland Park	Perry Hall, Maryland
F	23	Miya Bull	5 ft 11 in (1.8 m)	Jr	East Meck	Charlotte, North Carolina
F	25	Zaria Wright (redshirt)	5 ft 8 in (1.73 m)	So	First Assembly	Concord, North Carolina
F	32	Bria Gibson	6 ft 1 in (1.85 m)	Sr	Sanderson	Columbia, Maryland
F	33	Danielle Deoul (redshirt)	6 ft 2 in (1.88 m)	So	Immaculate Conception	Washingtonville, New York
F	40	Olivia VanSlooten	6 ft 3 in (1.91 m)	Jr	Ottawa Hills	Toledo, Ohio
F	44	Mikaela Johnson	6 ft 0 in (1.83 m)	Fr	North Surry	Mount Airy, North Carolina

Head coach

- DeUnna Hendrix (Richmond)

Assistant coach(es)

- Heather Kearney (Slippery Rock)
- Jenna Burkett (Robert Morris)
- Hailey Yohn (Coker)

Legend

- (C) Team captain
- (S) Suspended
- (I) Ineligible
- (W) Walk-on
- Injured
- Current redshirt

Roster
Last update: October 29, 2018

== Preseason Honors ==
For the second straight season, senior guard Emma Bockrath was voted the Big South Conference preseason player of the year. In 2017–18, Bockrath ranked first in the conference in steals per game in conference play (2.7), fifth in points (14.1), sixth in field goal percentage (43.2%), and seventh in rebounds (6.6). Longtime AAU teammate Shea Morgan was named to the All-Big South Second Team.

The Panthers were picked to finish second in the Big South Conference, behind Radford.

== Schedule and results ==
Date time, TV	Rank^{#}	Opponent^{#}	Result	Record	High points	High rebounds	High assists	Site (attendance) city, state
Non-conference regular season
Nov 9, 2018*; 7:00 pm, ESPN+		North Carolina Central	W 80–69	1–0	22 – Bockrath	11 – Gibson	7 – Morgan	Millis Athletic Center (691); High Point, NC
Nov 14, 2018*; 7:00 pm, ESPN+		Mars Hill	W 86–36	2–0	21 – Bockrath	10 – 2 Tied	9 – Brown	Millis Center; High Point, NC
Nov 18, 2018*; 2:00 pm, SEC Network		Kentucky	L 49–71	2–1	14 – Bockrath	11 – Edwards	4 – Brown	Memorial Coliseum (4064); Lexington, KY
Nov 20, 2018*; 12:00 pm, ESPN+		Miami (Ohio)	L 55–68	2–2	18 – Edwards	8 – Brown	5 – Brown	Millett Hall (1052); Oxford, OH
Nov 26, 2018*; 7:00 pm, ESPN+		Davidson	L 62–71	2–3	17 – Bockrath	7 – Bockrath	4 – Bockrath	John M. Belk Arena (389); Davidson, NC
Nov 29, 2018*; 7:00 pm, ESPN+		Greensboro College	W 102–50	3–3	21 – Curran	10 – Bockrath	6 – 2 Tied	Millis Center (622); High Point, NC
Dec 1, 2018*; 5:00 pm, ESPN+		UNC Greensboro	W 82–75	4–3	17 – Edwards	6 – Morgan	6 – Bockrath	Millis Center (1013); High Point, NC
Dec 5, 2018*; 7:00 pm, ACC Network		Clemson	L 64–83	4–4	19 – Edwards	9 – Bockrath	5 – Brown	Littlejohn Coliseum (564); Clemson, SC
Dec 15, 2018*; 2:00 pm, ESPN+		Norfolk State	W 83–51	5–4	20 – Edwards	8 – Morgan	6 – Bockrath	Millis Center (551); High Point, NC
Dec 20, 2018*; 5:00 pm, ESPN+		American	W 66–61	6–4	22 – Bockrath	10 – Morgan	5 – Brown	Millis Center (423); High Point, NC
Dec 29, 2018*; 1:00 pm, SoCon Digital Network		ETSU	W 73–65	7–4	20 – Bockrath	8 – 3 tied	6 – Brown	J. Madison Brooks Coliseum (829); Johnson City, TN
Big South regular season
Jan 5, 2019; 2:00 pm, ESPN+		USC Upstate	W 87–61	8–4 (1–0)	17 – Bockrath	13 – Bull	7 – Bockrath	G. B. Hodge Center (315); Spartanburg, SC
Jan 8, 2019; 7:00 pm, ESPN+		Radford	L 58–80	8–5 (1–1)	22 – Bockrath	9 – Gibson	4 – Bockrath	Dedmon Center (597); Radford, VA
Jan 10, 2019; 4:00 pm, ESPN+		Presbyterian	W 79–40	9–5 (2–1)	15 – Curran	7 – 2 tied	6 – 2 tied	Millis Center (457); High Point, NC
Jan 12, 2019; 2:00 pm, ESPN+		Gardner–Webb	W 78–61	10–5 (3–1)	17 – Morgan	8 – Gibson	8 – Morgan	Paul Porter Arena (466); Boiling Springs, NC
Jan 19, 2019; 2:00 pm, ESPN+		UNC Asheville	L 56–67	10–6 (3–2)	14 – Morgan	10 – Morgan	5 – Brown	Kimmel Arena (2314); Asheville, NC
Jan 22, 2019; 7:00 pm, ESPN+		Campbell	W 65–60	11–6 (4–2)	23 – Bockrath	9 – Bockrath	5 – Morgan	Millis Center (684); High Point, NC
Jan 26, 2019; 2:00 pm, ESPN+		Charleston Southern	W 71–64 ^{OT}	12–6 (5–2)	18 – Brown & Gibson	11 – 2 Tied	9 – Brown	Millis Center (621); High Point, NC
Jan 29, 2019; 7:00 pm, ESPN+		Winthrop	W 56–54	13–6 (6–2)	17 – Edwards	6 – 3 Tied	2 – 2 Tied	Millis Center (589); High Point, NC
Feb 2, 2019; 2:00 pm, ESPN+		Hampton	W 82–73	14–6 (7–2)	32 – Bockrath	10 – Bockrath	7 – Brown	Millis Center (603); High Point, NC
Feb 5, 2019; 7:00 pm, ESPN+		Longwood	W 65–54	15–6 (8–2)	15 – Bockrath	8 – 2 Tied	5 – Brown	Willett Hall (308); Farmville, VA
Feb 9, 2019; 2:00 pm, ESPN+		Radford	L 79–84 ^{2OT}	15–7 (8–3)	22 – Morgan	10 – 2 Tied	10 – Brown	Millis Center (596); High Point, NC
Feb 12, 2019; 7:00 pm, ESPN+		Charleston Southern	W 69–62	16–7 (9–3)	18 – Gibson	8 – 2 Tied	7 – Morgan	CSU Field House (101); North Charleston, SC
Feb 16, 2019; 2:00 pm, ESPN+		Presbyterian	W 70–63	17–7 (10–3)	22 – Morgan	7 – Gibson	10 – Brown	Templeton Center (346); Clinton, SC
Feb 23, 2019; 4:00 pm, ESPN+		Gardner–Webb	W 78–70 ^{OT}	18–7 (11–3)	24 – Gibson	11 – Bockrath	5 – 2 Tied	Millis Center; High Point, NC
Feb 26, 2019; 7:00 pm, ESPN+		Longwood	W 70–47	19–7 (12–3)	18 – Edwards	6 – 2 Tied	5 – 2 Tied	Millis Center (586); High Point, NC
Mar 2, 2019; 4:00 pm, ESPN+		Hampton	W 104–98	20–7 (13–3)	26 – Gibson	10 – Bockrath	7 – 2 Tied	Hampton Convocation Center (2,512); Hampton, VA
Mar 6, 2019; 7:00 pm, ESPN+		UNC Asheville	W 82–81 ^{OT}	21–7 (14–3)	29 – Bockrath	7 – Gibson	7 – Brown	Millis Center (568); High Point, NC
Big South Conference tournament
Mar 14, 2019; 6:00 pm, ESPN+	(2)	(7) Charleston Southern; Quarterfinals	L 61–65	22–8	16 – Morgan	5 – Morgan	5 – Bockrath	Millis Center; High Point, NC
WNIT
Mar 21, 2019*; 7:00 pm, ESPN+		at Ohio; First Round	L 74–81	22–9	19 – Brown	9 – Morgan	3 – 3 Tied	Convocation Center (567); Athens, OH
*Non-conference game. (#) Tournament seedings in parentheses. All times are in Eastern Time Source.

== Individual statistics ==
Player	GP	GS	MPG	FG%	3 PT%	FT%	RPG	APG	TO	STL	BLK	PPG
Emma Bockrath	31	31	34.4	.435	.354	.620	7.0	3.4	79	88	5	16.0
Shea Morgan	31	31	31.4	.421	.200	.818	5.5	2.5	87	46	15	11.2
Lindsey Edwards	31	31	32.2	.403	.281	.785	4.6	1.8	64	67	8	10.6
Bria Gibson	29	4	18.8	.541	.000	.703	5.7	0.5	60	28	15	10.4
Camryn Brown	31	30	29.6	.378	.346	.719	2.8	4.7	95	44	5	9.7
Skyler Curran	31	0	17.4	.364	.345	.615	2.1	0.8	45	26	6	7.2
Miya Bull	31	0	17.3	.561	.000	.558	4.9	0.6	39	31	21	4.6
Mikaela Johnson	2	0	3.5	1.000	.000	.000	1.0	0.0	1	0	0	3.0
Bre Davis	29	1	10.6	.290	.276	.733	0.6	1.6	48	9	1	2.1
Olivia VanSlooten	30	27	14.6	.356	.000	.333	2.6	0.5	25	7	7	1.5

=== Season highs ===
Player	Most Pts	Most Reb	Most Ast
Emma Bockrath	32 vs HAM	11 vs CSU	7 @ USCU
Camryn Brown	20 vs NCC	9 vs CSU	10 vs RAD
Miya Bull	16 @ HAM	13 @ USCU	3 vs HAM
Skyler Curran	21 vs GC	5 vs CSU	5 vs GC
Bre Davis	9 vs PC	2 vs CAM	7 @ HAM
Lindsey Edwards	20 vs NSU	11 @ UK	6 vs GC
Bria Gibson	26 @ HAM	11 vs CSU	2 vs CSU
Shea Morgan	22 vs RAD	10 vs AMER	8 @ GWU
Olivia VanSlooten	8 vs GC	8 @ UK	2 @ ETSU
