= 2023 Big South Conference women's basketball tournament =

- Classification: Division I
- Season: 2022–23
- Teams: 10
- Site: Bojangles Coliseum; Charlotte, North Carolina
- Champions: Gardner-Webb (2nd title)
- Winning coach: Alex Simmons (1st title)
- Television: ESPN+, ESPNU

2022–23 Big South women's basketball standings
	Conf.				Overall
Team	W		L	PCT	W		L	PCT
Gardner–Webb†	18	–	0	1.000	29	–	5	.853
High Point	13	–	5	.722	17	–	15	.531
Campbell	10	–	8	.556	16	–	15	.516
Presbyterian	9	–	9	.500	13	–	17	.433
Radford	9	–	9	.500	14	–	17	.452
Longwood	8	–	10	.444	9	–	21	.300
UNC Asheville	7	–	11	.389	12	–	19	.387
USC Upstate	7	–	11	.389	11	–	20	.355
Winthrop	6	–	12	.333	8	–	22	.267
Charleston Southern	3	–	15	.167	5	–	25	.167
† 2023 Big South tournament winner As of March 17, 2023

The 2023 Big South women's basketball tournament was the postseason women's basketball tournament that will end the 2022–23 NCAA Division I women's basketball season of the Big South Conference. It was held from March 1 through March 5 and played at Bojangles Coliseum. The tournament winner will receive the automatic bid to the 2023 NCAA tournament.

== Seeds ==
All of the conference teams competed in the tournament. The top six teams received a first-round bye. Teams were seeded by record within the conference, with a tiebreaker system to seed teams with identical conference records.

The tiebreakers operate in the following order:

1. Head-to-head record.
2. Record against the top-ranked conference team not involved in the tie, going down the standings until the tie is broken. For this purpose, teams with the same conference record are considered collectively. If two teams were unbeaten or winless against an opponent but did not play the same number of games against that opponent, the tie is not considered broken.

Seed	School	Conference	Overall	Tiebreaker 1	Tiebreaker 2
1	Gardner-Webb	18-0	26-4		
2	High Point	13-5	15-13		
3	Campbell	10-8	15-14		
4	Radford	9-9	13-16	1-1 vs. Presbyterian	1-1 vs. High Point
5	Presbyterian	9-9	13-16	1-1 vs. Radford	0-2 vs. High Point
6	Longwood	8-10	9-20		
7	USC Upstate	7-11	10-19	1-1 vs. UNC Asheville	2-2 vs. Radford/Presbyterian
8	UNC Asheville	7-11	11-18	1-1 vs. USC Upstate	1-3 vs. Radford/Presbyterian
9	Winthrop	6-12	8-21		
10	Charleston Southern	3-15	5-27		

== Schedule ==
Game	Time*	Matchup	Score	Channel
Opening round - Wednesday, March 1
1	12:00 pm	No. 8 UNC Asheville vs. No. 9 Winthrop	59–58	ESPN+
2	2:00 pm	No. 7 USC Upstate vs. No. 10 Charleston Southern	65-48	ESPN+
Quarterfinals - Thursday, March 2
3	12:00 pm	No. 1 Gardner-Webb vs. No. 8 UNC Asheville	82-58	ESPN+
4	2:00 pm	No. 4 Radford vs. No. 5 Presbyterian	69-68	ESPN+
5	6:00 pm	No. 2 High Point vs. No. 7 USC Upstate	50-43	ESPN+
6	8:00 pm	No. 3 Campbell vs. No. 6 Longwood	62-43	ESPN+
Semifinals - Saturday, March 4
7	6:00 pm	No. 1 Gardner-Webb vs. No. 4 Radford	89-81^{OT}	ESPN+
8	8:00 pm	No. 2 High Point vs. No. 3 Campbell	69-50	ESPN+
Championship - Sunday, March 5
9	6:00 pm	No. 1 Gardner-Webb vs. No. 2 High Point	74-61	ESPNU
*Game times in ET

== Bracket ==
First round Wednesday, March 1 ESPN+
8	UNC Asheville	59
9	Winthrop	58
7	USC Upstate	65
10	Charleston Southern	48

Quarterfinals; Thursday, March 2 ESPN+
1	Gardner-Webb	82
8	UNC Asheville	54
4	Radford	59
5	Presbyterian	58
2	High Point	50
7	USC Upstate	43
3	Campbell	62
6	Longwood	43

Semifinals; Saturday, March 4 ESPN+
1	Gardner-Webb	89*
4	Radford	81
2	High Point	69
3	Campbell	50

Championship; Sunday, March 5 ESPNU
1	Gardner-Webb	74
2	High Point	61

Note: * denotes overtime
