= 2021–22 Longwood Lancers women's basketball team =

American college basketball season

2021–22 Longwood Lancers women's basketball

Big South regular season co-champions Big South tournament champions

NCAA tournament, first round
- Conference: Big South Conference
- Record: 22–12 (15–3 Big South)
- Head coach: Rebecca Tillet (4th season)
- Assistant coaches: Ryenn Micaletti; Jessica Olmstead; Ka'lia Johnson
- Home arena: Willett Hall

2021–22 Big South women's basketball standings
	Conf.				Overall
Team	W		L	PCT	W		L	PCT
Campbell	15	–	3	.833	23	–	8	.742
Longwood †	15	–	3	.833	22	–	12	.647
USC Upstate	14	–	4	.778	22	–	8	.733
Gardner–Webb	13	–	5	.722	16	–	15	.516
High Point	13	–	5	.722	17	–	14	.548
North Carolina A&T	11	–	7	.611	14	–	15	.483
Hampton	8	–	9	.471	13	–	16	.448
Presbyterian	6	–	12	.333	12	–	18	.400
Winthrop	4	–	14	.222	6	–	24	.200
UNC Asheville	3	–	15	.167	10	–	22	.313
Radford	3	–	15	.167	7	–	23	.233
Charleston Southern	2	–	15	.118	2	–	27	.069
† 2022 Big South tournament winner

The 2021–22 Longwood Lancers women's basketball team represented Longwood University in the 2021–22 NCAA Division I women's basketball season. The Lancers, led by fourth-year head coach Rebecca Tillet, played their home games at Willett Hall in Farmville, Virginia as members of the Big South Conference.

They finished the season 22–12, 15–3 in Big South play, to finish as co-Big South regular season champions. As the second seed in the Big South tournament, they defeated Hampton, UNC Asheville and Campbell to win the championship. As a result, the Lancers received the conference's automatic bid to the NCAA tournament, the school's first-ever trip to the tournament. They were seeded as one of the sixteen seeds in the Bridgeport Region. They played a First Four matchup with Mount St. Mary's, which they won to advance to the first round. There, they fell to first seed NC State to end their season.

== Previous season ==
The Lancers finished the 2020–21 season 14–11, and 12–6 in Big South play, to finish in third place. As the third seed in the Big South tournament, they defeated UNC Ashville before losing to Campbell in the semifinals. They received an invitation to the WBI, but withdrew due to the ongoing COVID-19 pandemic.

== Roster ==
2021–22 Longwood Lancers women's basketball team
Players
Coaches

Pos.	#	Name	Height	Year	Previous school	Hometown
F	0	Brooke Anya	6 ft 0 in (1.83 m)	So	St. Andrew's Episcopal	Gaithersburg, MD
G	1	Kyla McMakin	5 ft 11 in (1.8 m)	Jr	Ocean Lakes	Virginia Beach, VA
G	2	Milou Vennema	5 ft 11 in (1.8 m)	Sr	Johan Cruyff Institute	Groningen, Netherlands
G	3	Adriana Shipp	5 ft 10 in (1.78 m)	RS So	Deep Creek	Chesapeake, VA
G	4	Kennedy Calhoun	5 ft 5 in (1.65 m)	Fr	Hickory Ridge	Harrisburg, NC
G	10	Isabel Tillett	5 ft 9 in (1.75 m)	Fr	Cosby	Chesterfield, VA
F	11	Cayla Copeland	5 ft 10 in (1.78 m)	Fr	Western Branch	Chesapeake, VA
F	13	Akila Smith	5 ft 11 in (1.8 m)	Sr	Ocoee	Orlando, FL
G	14	Tra'Dayja Smith	5 ft 5 in (1.65 m)	Sr	Madisonville; Trinity Valley CC	Madisonville, TX
C	21	Hannah Osaro	6 ft 2 in (1.88 m)	So	Osbourn Park	Manassas, VA
G	23	Jael Hall	5 ft 6 in (1.68 m)	Fr	Concord Academy	Mooresville, NC
F	24	Geassy Germano	6 ft 1 in (1.85 m)	Jr	Friendship Christian; Iowa Western CC	Americana, Brazil
G	30	Anne-Hamilton Leroy	5 ft 10 in (1.78 m)	Jr	Seneca	Seneca, SC
G	35	Bri Johns	5 ft 11 in (1.8 m)	So	Edison	Alexandria, VA

Head coach

- Rebecca Tillett (William & Mary)

Assistant coach(es)

- Ryenn Micaletti (Seton Hill)
- Jessica Olmstead (Youngstown State)
- Ka'lia Johnson (Duke)

Legend

- (C) Team captain
- (S) Suspended
- (I) Ineligible
- (W) Walk-on
- Injured
- Current redshirt

Roster
Last update: June 6, 2022

== Schedule and results ==
Date time, TV	Rank^{#}	Opponent^{#}	Result	Record	Site (attendance) city, state
Non-conference regular season
November 9, 2021*; 11:00 a.m., BTN+		at No. 4 Maryland	L 67–97	0–1	Xfinity Center (4,613); College Park, MD
November 12, 2021*; Noon, ESPN+		Stony Brook	L 63–82	0–2	Willett Hall; Farmville, VA
November 17, 2021*; 11:00 a.m., ESPN+		Duquesne	W 77–76	1–2	Willett Hall; Farmville, VA
November 20, 2021*; 2:00 p.m.		at Saint Francis (PA)	W 63–54	2–2	DeGol Arena (525); Loretto, PA
November 28, 2021*; 3:00 p.m., ESPN+		at Lamar	W 62–59	3–2	Montagne Center (511); Beaumont, TX
November 30, 2021*; 7:30 p.m., ESPN+		at Sam Houston State	L 65–66	3–3	Bernard Johnson Coliseum (238); Huntsville, TX
December 3, 2021*; 7:00 p.m., ESPN3		at Drake	L 82–104	3–4	Knapp Center (1,981); Des Moines, IA
December 5, 2021*; 1:00 p.m., ESPN+		at No. 13 Iowa State	L 56–94	3–5	Hilton Coliseum (9,542); Ames, IA
December 11, 2021*; 2:00 p.m.		at Drexel	L 57–79	3–6	Daskalakis Athletic Center (524); Philadelphia, PA
December 15, 2021*; 7:00 p.m., ESPN+		Richmond	L 70–83	3–7	Willett Hall (208); Farmville, VA
December 18, 2021*; 3:00 p.m., ESPN+		American	L 58–62	3–8	Willett Hall (218); Farmville, VA
Big South regular season
December 29, 2021; 6:00 p.m., ESPN+		at North Carolina A&T	W 76–45	4–8 (1–0)	Corbett Sports Center (237); Greensboro, NC
January 1, 2022; 2:00 p.m., ESPN+		at Presbyterian	W 83–78	5–8 (2–0)	Templeton Physical Education Center (117); Clinton, SC
January 5, 2022; 7:00 p.m., ESPN+		UNC Asheville	W 62–57	6–8 (3–0)	Willett Hall (230); Farmville, VA
January 8, 2022; 2:00 p.m., ESPN+		at UNC Asheville	W 76–72	7–8 (4–0)	Kimmel Arena (100); Asheville, NC
January 11, 2022; 7:00 p.m., ESPN+		at Campbell	L 41–69	7–9 (4–1)	Gore Arena; Buies Creek, NC
January 19, 2022; 3:00 p.m., ESPN+		USC Upstate	L 69–76	7–10 (4–2)	Willett Hall (135); Farmville, VA
January 22, 2022; 3:00 p.m., ESPN+		Gardner–Webb	W 86–75	8–10 (5–2)	Willett Hall; Farmville, VA
January 23, 2022; 3:00 p.m., ESPN+		Winthrop	W 85–58	9–10 (6–2)	Willett Hall (200); Farmville, VA
January 25, 2022; 7:00 p.m., ESPN+		at High Point	W 77–64	10–10 (7–2)	Qubein Center (552); High Point, NC
January 29, 2022; 2:00 p.m., ESPN+		at Radford	W 78–51	11–10 (8–2)	Dedmon Center (620); Radford, VA
February 2, 2022; 7:00 p.m., ESPN+		Charleston Southern	W 91–59	12–10 (9–2)	Willett Hall (450); Farmville, VA
February 5, 2022; 3:00 p.m., ESPN+		Campbell	L 45–58	12–11 (9–3)	Willett Hall (701); Farmville, VA
February 12, 2022; 2:00 p.m., ESPN+		at Winthrop	W 78–56	13–11 (10–3)	Winthrop Coliseum (268); Rock Hill, SC
February 16, 2022; 7:00 p.m., ESPN3		North Carolina A&T	W 85–71	14–11 (11–3)	Willett Hall (327); Farmville, VA
February 19, 2022; 3:00 p.m., ESPN+		Presbyterian	W 76–63	15–11 (12–3)	Willett Hall (1,009); Farmville, VA
February 20, 2022; 4:00 p.m., ESPN+		at Hampton	W 77–51	16–11 (13–3)	Hampton Convocation Center; Hampton, VA
February 23, 2022; 6:00 p.m., ESPN+		at USC Upstate	W 71–66	17–11 (14–3)	G. B. Hodge Center (765); Spartanburg, SC
February 26, 2022; 3:00 p.m., ESPN+		Hampton	W 76–62	18–11 (15–3)	Willett Hall (653); Farmville, VA
Big South tournament
March 3, 2022; 6:00 p.m., ESPN+	(2)	vs. (7) Hampton; Quarterfinal	W 70–61	19–11	Bojangles Coliseum (1,437); Charlotte, NC
March 5, 2022; 8:00 p.m., ESPN+	(2)	vs. (11) UNC Asheville; Semifinal	W 81–56	20–11	Bojangles Coliseum; Charlotte, NC
March 6, 2022; 8:30 p.m., ESPN2	(2)	vs. (1) Campbell; Final	W 86–47	21–11	Bojangles Coliseum (1,029); Charlotte, NC
NCAA tournament
March 17, 2022; 7:00 p.m., ESPN2	(16 B)	vs. (16 B) Mount St. Mary's; First Four	W 74–70	22–11	Reynolds Coliseum (648); Raleigh, NC
March 19, 2022; 2:00 p.m., ESPN	(16 B)	at (1 B) No. 3 NC State; First round	L 68–96	22–12	Reynolds Coliseum (5,483); Raleigh, NC
*Non-conference game. ^{#}Rankings from AP poll. (#) Tournament seedings in parentheses. B=Bridgeport. All times are in Eastern.

== Rankings ==
Ranking movements Legend: — = Not ranked
	Week																		
Poll	Pre	1	2	3	4	5	6	7	8	9	10	11	12	13	14	15	16	17	Final
AP	—	—	—	—	—	—	—	—	—	—	—	—	—	—	—	—	—	—	—
Coaches	—	—	—	—	—	—	—	—	—	—	—	—	—	—	—	—	—	—	—

Legend
	Increase in ranking
	Decrease in ranking
	Not ranked previous week
(RV)	Received votes
(NR)	Not ranked and did not receive votes

The Coaches Poll did not release a Week 2 poll, and the AP poll did not release a poll after the NCAA tournament.
