= Alex Simmons =

American basketball coach (born 1986)

Personal information
- Born: July 7, 1986 (age 40) Fort Johnson South, Louisiana, U.S.
- Listed height: 6 ft 3 in (1.91 m)

Career information
- High school: Shelbyville Central (Shelbyville, Tennessee)
- College: Tennessee (2004–2009)
- Position: Power forward / center
- Coaching career: 2009–present

Career history

Coaching
- 2009–2010: Kansas (graduate manager)
- 2010–2013: Middle Tennessee (assistant)
- 2013–2018: Ole Miss (assistant)
- 2018–2023: Gardner–Webb
- 2023–2026: Memphis

Career highlights
- As player: 2× NCAA champion (2007, 2008); McDonald's All-American (2004); Class AAA Tennessee Miss Basketball (2004); As coach: Big South regular season (2023); Big South tournament (2023); Big South Coach of the Year (2023)

Alexandria Patrice Simmons (née Fuller; born July 7, 1986) is an American basketball coach and former player. She was the head women's basketball coach at the University of Memphis from 2023 to 2026 and at Gardner–Webb University from 2018 to 2023.

== Playing career ==
Simmons played college basketball at Tennessee from 2004 to 2009, where she won two NCAA championships as a player.

=== Tennessee statistics ===
Legend
GP	Games played	GS	Games started	MPG	Minutes per game
FG%	Field goal percentage	3P%	3-point field goal percentage	FT%	Free throw percentage
RPG	Rebounds per game	APG	Assists per game	SPG	Steals per game
BPG	Blocks per game	PPG	Points per game	**Bold**	Career high

Year	Team	GP	Points	FG%	3P%	FT%	RPG	APG	SPG	BPG	PPG
2005–06	Tennessee	32	67	45.5%	**42.9%**	73.3%	2.0	0.7	0.4	0.2	2.1
2006–07	Tennessee	**37**	222	**49.7%**	36.6%	**77.6%**	4.1	0.9	0.8	**0.4**	6.0
2007–08	Tennessee	33	227	47.3%	32.4%	74.4%	3.1	0.6	0.5	0.4	6.1
2008–09	Tennessee	33	**249**	43.2%	22.9%	75.4%	**5.9**	**1.6**	**0.8**	0.2	**7.5**
Career		139	765	46.3%	32.3%	75.7%	3.8	0.9	0.6	0.3	5.5

== Coaching career ==
Simmons began her coaching career as a graduate student manager at Kansas in 2009. She was later an assistant coach at Middle Tennessee and Ole Miss, working under her former high school coach Rick Insell at Middle Tennessee and Insell's son Matt at Ole Miss.

=== Gardner–Webb ===
Simmons was named the head coach at Gardner–Webb on April 24, 2018.

== Head coaching record ==
Record table
Season	Team	Overall	Conference	Standing	Postseason
Gardner–Webb Runnin' Bulldogs (Big South Conference) (2018–2023)
2018–19	Gardner–Webb	16–15	10–8	T–5th	
2019–20	Gardner–Webb	18–11	13–7	5th	
2020–21	Gardner–Webb	11–13	10–7	4th	
2021–22	Gardner–Webb	16–15	13–5	4th	
2022–23	Gardner–Webb	29–5	16–0	1st	NCAA First Round
Gardner–Webb:		90–59 (.604)	62–27 (.697)		
Memphis Tigers (American Athletic Conference) (2023–2026)
2023–24	Memphis	13–17	9–9	T–6th	
2024–25	Memphis	7–23	5–13	10th	
2025–26	Memphis	10–21	4–14	T–12th	
Memphis:		30–61 (.330)	18–36 (.333)		
Total:		120–120 (.500)			
National champion Postseason invitational champion Conference regular season champion Conference regular season and conference tournament champion Division regular season champion Division regular season and conference tournament champion Conference tournament champion
