= South Carolina State Lady Bulldogs basketball =

South Carolina State Lady Bulldogs
2025–26 South Carolina State Lady Bulldogs basketball team
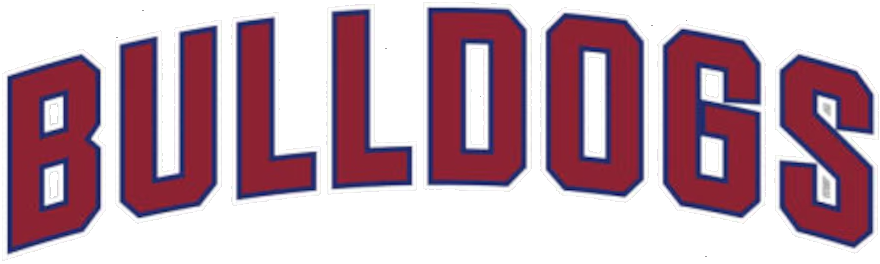
- University: South Carolina State University
- Head coach: Cedric Baker (1st season)
- Location: Orangeburg, South Carolina
- Arena: SHM Memorial Center (capacity: 3,000)
- Conference: MEAC
- Nickname: Lady Bulldogs
- Colors: Garnet and blue

NCAA Division I tournament appearances
- 1983

AIAW tournament champions
- Division II: 1979
Other AIAW tournament results
Runner-up	Division II: 1978
Final Four	Division II: 1978, 1979
Quarterfinals	Division II: 1978, 1979
Second round	Division II: 1980
Appearances	Division II: 1978, 1979, 1980

Conference tournament champions
- 1978, 1979, 1983, 1986, 1992, 1993

Conference regular-season champions
- 1984, 1985, 1986, 1991, 1992, 1993, 1994

Uniforms
Home	Away

The South Carolina State Lady Bulldogs women's basketball team represents South Carolina State University in women's basketball. The school competes in the Mid-Eastern Athletic Conference in Division I of the National Collegiate Athletic Association (NCAA). The Bulldogs play home basketball games at SHM Memorial Center in Orangeburg, South Carolina.

== History ==
The Lady Bulldogs won the MEAC Tournament four times in an eight year span from 1978 to 1986, while winning back-to-back Tournaments in 1992 and 1993, but they made only one appearance in the NCAA Tournament (1983), as the MEAC champions did not go to the NCAA Tournament again until 1994. In their only tournament appearance, they beat La Salle 85–67 in the play-in game, while losing to Tennessee 86–51 in the First Round.

== Postseason ==
=== NCAA Division I ===
Year	Seed	Round	Opponent	Result
1983	#9	Play-in; First Round	#8 La Salle #1 Tennessee	W 85–67; L 51–86

=== AIAW College Division/Division II ===
The Lady Bulldogs made three appearances in the AIAW National Division II basketball tournament, with a combined record of 7–2.

Year	Round	Opponent	Result
1978	First Round; Quarterfinals; Semifinals; National Championship	Eastern Washington; Southeastern Louisiana; Biola; High Point	W, 88–53; W, 100–98; W, 88–78; L, 88–92
1979	First Round; Quarterfinals; Semifinals; National Championship	Emporia State; Seton Hall; Tuskegee; Dayton	W, 86–47; W, 91–53; W, 85–70; W, 73–68
1980	Second Round	William Penn	L, 68–69
