= Dayton Flyers basketball =

Dayton Flyers basketball may refer to either of the basketball teams that represent the University of Dayton:

- Dayton Flyers men's basketball
- Dayton Flyers women's basketball
