= 2018–19 Radford Highlanders women's basketball team =

American women's college basketball season

2018–19 Radford Highlanders women's basketball
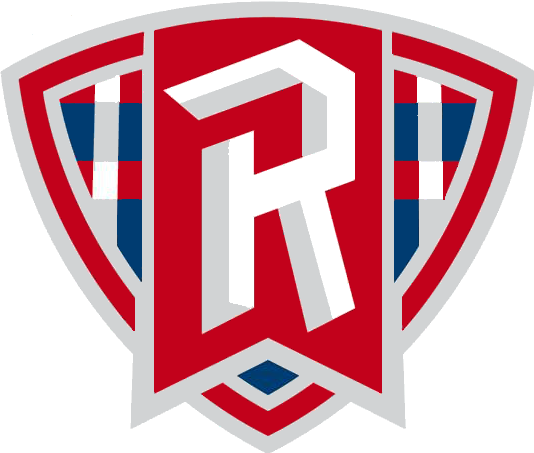

Big South regular-season and tournament champions

NCAA tournament, first round
- Conference: Big South Conference
- Record: 26–7 (17–1 Big South)
- Head coach: Mike McGuire (6th season)
- Assistant coaches: Christie Rogers; Ross Jolly; Camille Collier
- Home arena: Dedmon Center

2018–19 Big South women's basketball standings
	Conf.				Overall
Team	W		L	PCT	W		L	PCT
Radford †	17	–	1	.944	26	–	6	.813
High Point	15	–	3	.833	22	–	8	.733
Hampton	12	–	6	.667	16	–	14	.533
UNC Asheville	11	–	7	.611	17	–	13	.567
Campbell	10	–	8	.556	20	–	12	.625
Gardner-Webb	10	–	8	.556	16	–	15	.516
Charleston Southern	9	–	9	.500	14	–	17	.452
Winthrop	6	–	12	.333	10	–	20	.333
Presbyterian	4	–	14	.222	7	–	24	.226
USC Upstate	3	–	15	.167	7	–	23	.233
Longwood	2	–	16	.111	3	–	26	.103
† 2019 Big South tournament winner As of March 14, 2019; Rankings from AP poll

The 2018–19 Radford Highlanders women's basketball team represented Radford University during the 2018–19 NCAA Division I women's basketball season. The Highlanders were led by sixth-year head coach Mike McGuire and played their home games at the Dedmon Center in Radford, Virginia as members of the Big South Conference. They finished the season 26–7, 17–1 in Big South play, to win the Big South regular-season title. The Highlanders, who won a school-record 26 games, won the conference tournament championship game over Campbell—their first title since 1996—to earn an automatic bid of the NCAA women's tournament where they lost to Maryland in the first round.

== Roster ==
2018–19 Radford Highlanders women's basketball team
Players
Coaches

Pos.	#	Name	Height	Year	Previous school	Hometown
F	2	Tina Lindenfeld	6 ft 1 in (1.85 m)	So	Midlothian	Richmond, VA
G	4	Khiana Johnson	5 ft 7 in (1.7 m)	Jr	Western Branch	Chesapeake, VA
G	5	Jen Falconer	5 ft 8 in (1.73 m)	RS Jr	Cumberland Valley	Mechanicsburg, PA
G/F	10	Destinee Walker	5 ft 10 in (1.78 m)	Sr	West Florence	Florence, SC
G	12	Bryonna McClean	5 ft 9 in (1.75 m)	Fr	Princess Anne	Virginia Beach, VA
G	14	Makaila Wilson	5 ft 10 in (1.78 m)	Fr	Brentwood Academy	Nashville, TN
F	20	Lydia Rivers	6 ft 2 in (1.88 m)	RS Jr	Kinston	Kinston, NC
G/F	21	Piper Morningstar	6 ft 0 in (1.83 m)	Fr	North Allegheny	Pittsburgh, PA
G	23	Alexis Jackson	5 ft 9 in (1.75 m)	Sr	Meade	Severn, MD
F	35	Amele Ngwafang	6 ft 0 in (1.83 m)	Fr	Paint Branch	Silver Spring, MD
F	42	Laney Corbin	6 ft 0 in (1.83 m)	So	Page County	Stanley, VA
F	45	Savannah Felgemacher	6 ft 3 in (1.91 m)	RS Jr	James Madison	Church Hill, TN
C	50	Sydney Nunley	6 ft 4 in (1.93 m)	RS Jr	Greenbrier East	Lewisburg, WV

Head coach

- Mike McGuire (Roanoke)

Assistant coach(es)

- Christie Rogers (Washington)
- Ross Jolly (Chattanooga)
- Camille Collier (Wake Forest)

Legend

- (C) Team captain
- (S) Suspended
- (I) Ineligible
- (W) Walk-on
- Injured
- Current redshirt

Roster
Last update: July 1, 2024

== Schedule ==
Date time, TV	Rank^{#}	Opponent^{#}	Result	Record	Site (attendance) city, state
Exhibition
November 4, 2018*; 2:00 p.m.		Roanoke	W 77–27		Dedmon Center; Radford, VA
Non-conference regular season
November 7, 2018*; 7:00 p.m., ESPN+		South Carolina State	W 61–31	1–0	Dedmon Center (733); Radford, VA
November 15, 2018*; 11:00 a.m.		ETSU	W 79–64	2–0	Dedmon Center (724); Radford, VA
November 18, 2018*; 2:00 p.m., ACCNE		at No. 17 NC State	L 58–75	2–1	Reynolds Coliseum (2,405); Raleigh, NC
November 23, 2018*; 1:00 p.m.		vs. Temple; Miami Thanksgiving Classic	W 56–50	3–1	Watsco Center (569); Coral Gables, FL
November 25, 2018*; 12:00 p.m.		vs. Nebraska; Miami Thanksgiving Classic	L 39–77	3–2	Watsco Center (425); Coral Gables, FL
December 4, 2018*; 7:00 p.m., ACCNE		at Virginia Tech; New River Valley rivalry	L 44–55	3–3	Cassell Coliseum (1,763); Blacksburg, VA
December 8, 2018*; 2:00 p.m., ACCNE		at Virginia	W 57–44	4–3	John Paul Jones Arena (2,365); Charlottesville, VA
December 15, 2018*; 2:00 p.m., ESPN+		Morehead State	L 72–79	4–4	Dedmon Center (683); Radford, VA
December 19, 2018*; 6:00 p.m.		at VCU	W 54–49	5–4	Siegel Center (654); Richmond, VA
December 29, 2018*; 2:00 p.m., ESPN+		Shepherd	W 60–46	6–4	Dedmon Center (587); Radford, VA
January 2, 2019*; 7:00 p.m.		at Mount St. Mary's	L 72–79	6–5	Knott Arena (218); Emmitsburg, MD
Big South regular season
January 5, 2019; 2:00 p.m., ESPN+		UNC Asheville	W 60–46	7–5 (1–0)	Dedmon Center (818); Radford, VA
January 8, 2019; 7:00 p.m., ESPN+		High Point	W 80–58	8–5 (2–0)	Dedmon Center (597); Radford, VA
January 10, 2019; 5:00 p.m., ESPN+		at Hampton	L 54–68	8–6 (2–1)	Hampton Convocation Center (2,123); Hampton, VA
January 12, 2019; 2:00 p.m., ESPN+		Winthrop	W 70–49	9–6 (3–1)	Dedmon Center (616); Radford, VA
January 15, 2019; 7:00 p.m., ESPN+		at Charleston Southern	W 67–41	10–6 (4–1)	CSU Field House (217); North Charleston, SC
January 19, 2019; 3:00 p.m., ESPN+		at Longwood	W 68–34	11–6 (5–1)	Willett Hall (336); Farmville, VA
January 22, 2019; 7:00 p.m., ESPN+		Presbyterian	W 59–49	12–6 (6–1)	Dedmon Center (732); Radford, VA
January 26, 2019; 2:00 p.m., ESPN+		at Campbell	W 56–52	13–6 (7–1)	Pope Center (1,049); Buies Creek, NC
February 2, 2019; 2:00 p.m., ESPN+		at USC Upstate	W 82–41	14–6 (8–1)	G. B. Hodge Center (328); Spartanburg, SC
February 5, 2019; 7:00 p.m., ESPN+		Gardner–Webb	W 79–69	15–6 (9–1)	Dedmon Center (655); Radford, VA
February 9, 2019; 7:00 p.m., ESPN+		at High Point	W 84–79 ^{2OT}	16–6 (10–1)	Millis Center (596); High Point, NC
February 16, 2019; 2:00 p.m., ESPN+		Longwood	W 81–52	17–6 (11–1)	Dedmon Center (808); Radford, VA
February 19, 2019; 7:00 p.m., ESPN+		at Winthrop	W 79–57	18–6 (12–1)	Winthrop Coliseum (147); Rock Hill, SC
February 23, 2019; 2:00 p.m., ESPN+		Campbell	W 61–57	19–6 (13–1)	Dedmon Center (973); Radford, VA
February 26, 2019; 7:00 p.m.		at UNC Asheville	W 45–44	20–6 (14–1)	Kimmel Arena (913); Asheville, NC
March 2, 2019; 2:00 p.m., ESPN+		USC Upstate	W 55–43	21–6 (15–1)	Dedmon Center (802); Radford, VA
March 6, 2019; 7:00 p.m., ESPN+		Hampton	W 84–59	22–6 (16–1)	Dedmon Center (749); Radford, VA
March 9, 2019; 2:00 p.m., ESPN+		at Presbyterian	W 48–43	23–6 (17–1)	Templeton Center (256); Clinton, SC
Big South women's tournament
March 14, 2019; 7:00 p.m., ESPN3	(1)	(9) Presbyterian; Quarterfinals	W 60–49	24–6	Dedmon Center (981); Radford, VA
March 15, 2019; 6:00 p.m., ESPN+	(1)	(4) UNC Asheville; Semifinals	W 59–52	25–6	Dedmon Center (817); Radford, VA
March 17, 2019; 2:00 p.m., ESPN+	(1)	(6) Campbell; Championship game	W 57–45	26–6	Dedmon Center (1,162); Radford, VA
NCAA women's tournament
March 23, 2019*; 11:00 a.m., ESPN2	(14 A)	at (3 A) No. 9 Maryland; First round	L 51–73	26–7	Xfinity Center (5,072); College Park, MD
*Non-conference game. ^{#}Rankings from AP poll. (#) Tournament seedings in parentheses. A=Albany Region. All times are in Eastern.

== See also ==
- 2018–19 Radford Highlanders men's basketball team
