= Pepperdine Waves women's basketball =

| 2025–26 Pepperdine Waves women's basketball team |
- University: Pepperdine University
- Head coach: Katie Faulkner (2nd season)
- Location: Malibu, California
- Arena: Firestone Fieldhouse (capacity: 3,104)
- Conference: West Coast Conference
- Nickname: Waves
- Colors: Blue, white, and orange
- Student section: Riptide

NCAA Division I tournament appearances
- 2000, 2002, 2003, 2006

AIAW tournament quarterfinals
- Division II: 1978
Other AIAW tournament results
| Appearances | Division II: 1978, 1979 |

Conference tournament champions
- 2002, 2003, 2006

Conference regular-season champions
- 1999, 2000, 2002, 2003

Uniforms
| Home | Away | Alternate |

The Pepperdine Waves women's basketball team is the basketball team that represents Pepperdine University in Malibu, California, United States. The school's team currently competes in the West Coast Conference. The team's last appearance in the NCAA Division I women's basketball tournament was in 2006. Their home arena is the Firestone Fieldhouse, a multi-purpose facility that hosts basketball, volleyball, and many other athletic and university events. They share this facility with the Pepperdine Waves men's basketball team.

== Postseason Results ==
The Waves have made the NCAA Tournament four times (2000, 2002, 2003, 2006) and the WNIT six times (1999, 2001, 2004, 2010, 2011, 2019). As of the end of the 2015–16 season, the Waves had an all-time record of 622–579.

=== NCAA tournament results ===
The Waves have appeared in the NCAA tournament four times.

| Year | Seed | Round | Opponent | Result |
|---|---|---|---|---|
| 2000 | #13 | First Round | #4 Virginia | L 62–74 |
| 2002 | #8 | First Round | #9 Villanova | L 46–67 |
| 2003 | #12 | First Round | #5 Louisiana Tech | L 60–94 |
| 2006 | #15 | First Round | #2 Oklahoma | L 66–78 |

=== NIT results ===
The Waves have appeared in the National Invitation Tournament (WNIT) six times. Most recently in 2019 they made it to the Sweet Sixteen of the Women's National Invitational Tournament.

| Year | Round | Opponent | Result |
|---|---|---|---|
| 1999 | First Round | New Mexico | L 81 - 69 |
| 2001 | First Round | Arizona | L 85 - 65 |
| 2004 | First Round | Washington | L 71 - 59 |
| 2010 | First Round | BYU | L 62 - 58 |
| 2011 | First Round | Oklahoma St. | L 62 - 58 |
| 2019 | First Round; Second Round; Sweet Sixteen | California Baptist; Saint Mary's; Wyoming | W 91 - 79; W 65 - 61; L 61 - 60 |
| 2026 | First Round; Second Round; Super Sixteen | UC Davis; Southern Utah; South Dakota | W 71 - 68; W 85 - 80; TBD |

=== AIAW College Division/Division II ===
The Waves made two appearances in the AIAW National Division II basketball tournament, with a combined record of 1–2.

| Year | Round | Opponent | Result |
|---|---|---|---|
| 1978 | First Round; Quarterfinals | Fordham; Biola | W, 65–63; L, 60–96 |
| 1979 | First Round | Tougaloo | L, 41–69 |
