= 2022–23 Gardner–Webb Runnin' Bulldogs women's basketball team =

American college basketball season

2022–23 Gardner–Webb Runnin' Bulldogs women's basketball
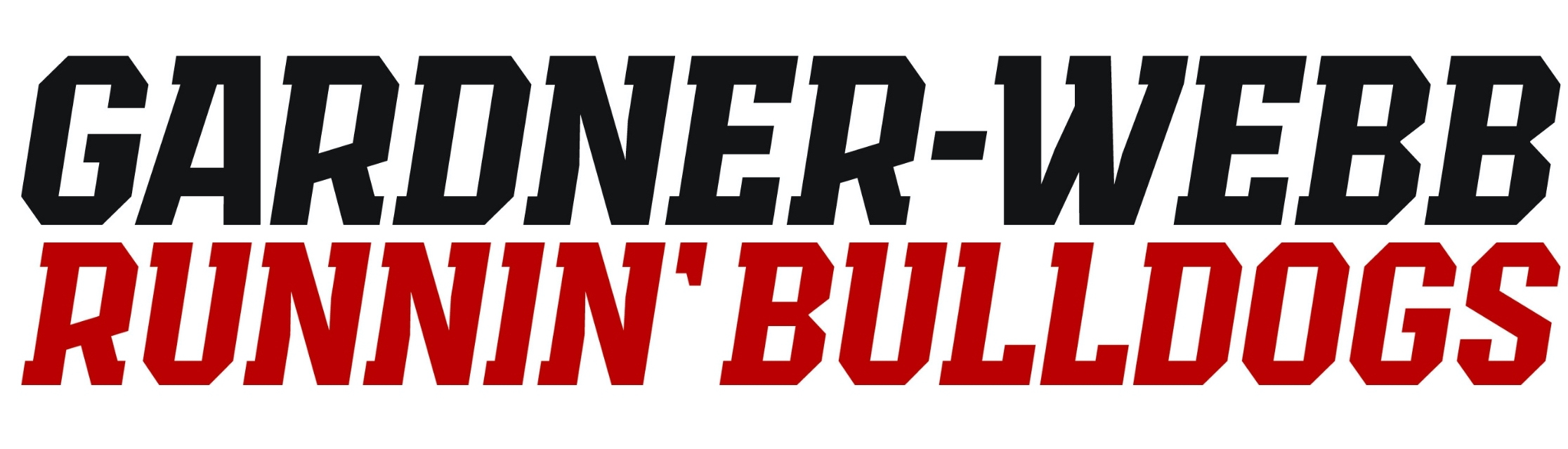

Big South regular season and Big South Tournament Champions

NCAA tournament, First Round
- Conference: Big South Conference
- Record: 29–5 (18–0 Big South)
- Head coach: Alex Simmons (5th season)
- Assistant coaches: Josh Cooperwood; Harlyn Wyatt; Melanie Walls
- Home arena: Paul Porter Arena

2022–23 Big South women's basketball standings
	Conf.				Overall
Team	W		L	PCT	W		L	PCT
Gardner–Webb†	18	–	0	1.000	29	–	5	.853
High Point	13	–	5	.722	17	–	15	.531
Campbell	10	–	8	.556	16	–	15	.516
Presbyterian	9	–	9	.500	13	–	17	.433
Radford	9	–	9	.500	14	–	17	.452
Longwood	8	–	10	.444	9	–	21	.300
UNC Asheville	7	–	11	.389	12	–	19	.387
USC Upstate	7	–	11	.389	11	–	20	.355
Winthrop	6	–	12	.333	8	–	22	.267
Charleston Southern	3	–	15	.167	5	–	25	.167
† 2023 Big South tournament winner As of March 17, 2023

The 2022–23 Gardner–Webb Runnin' Bulldogs women's basketball team represented Gardner–Webb University in the 2022–23 NCAA Division I women's basketball season. The Runnin' Bulldogs, led by fifth-year head coach Alex Simmons, played their home games at Paul Porter Arena in Boiling Springs, North Carolina as members of the Big South Conference.

== Roster ==
2022–23 Gardner–Webb Runnin' Bulldogs women's basketball team
Players
Coaches

Pos.	#	Name	Height	Year	Previous school	Hometown
G	0	Micahla Funderburk	5 ft 9 in (1.75 m)	Jr	Butler HS	Charlotte, NC
G	1	Ki'Ari Cain	5 ft 6 in (1.68 m)	Sr	Sumter HS	Sumter, SC
G	2	Lauren Bevis	5 ft 5 in (1.65 m)	Sr	Homeschooled	High Point, NC
G	3	L'Mia Littlejohn	5 ft 6 in (1.68 m)	Sr	Shelby HS; Western Carolina	Shelby, NC
G	4	Sarah Matthews	5 ft 8 in (1.73 m)	Sr	Forest Park HS; Gulf Coast State/Kilgore College	Atlanta, GA
G	5	Tiir Nyok	5 ft 11 in (1.8 m)	Fr	High Point Christian Academy	High Point, NC
G	10	Christina Deng	6 ft 0 in (1.83 m)	GS	Warwick HS; Queens (NC)	Aweil, South Sudan
F	11	Grace Knutsen	6 ft 0 in (1.83 m)	Sr	Alpharetta HS	Alpharetta, GA
G/F	12	Jhessyka Williams	5 ft 10 in (1.78 m)	GS	Laney HS	Augusta, GA
F	22	Layken Cox	6 ft 1 in (1.85 m)	So	Sumter HS	Sumter, SC
G	23	Cecilee Silver	5 ft 8 in (1.73 m)	Fr	Erwin HS	Asheville, NC
F	30	Alasia Smith	5 ft 10 in (1.78 m)	Jr	Science Hill HS	Johnson City, TN
G	31	Emily Gillis	5 ft 11 in (1.8 m)	Jr	Division Avenue HS	Levittown, NY
C	32	Grace Pack	6 ft 2 in (1.88 m)	Fr	TPLS Christian Academy	Midlothian, VA
F	33	Emma Capps	6 ft 1 in (1.85 m)	Jr	Stone Memorial HS	Crossville, TN

Head coach

- Alex Simmons (Tennessee)

Assistant coach(es)

- Josh Cooperwood (Tennessee State)
- Harlyn Wyatt (Tulane)
- Whitney Bays (Purdue)

Legend

- (C) Team captain
- (S) Suspended
- (I) Ineligible
- (W) Walk-on
- Injured
- Current redshirt

Roster

== Schedule and results ==
Date time, TV	Rank^{#}	Opponent^{#}	Result	Record	Site (attendance) city, state
Non-conference regular season
November 7, 2022*; 11:00 a.m., ACCNX		at Clemson	L 54–81	0–1	Littlejohn Coliseum (1,342); Clemson, SC
November 12, 2022*; 2:00 p.m., ESPN+		UNC Greensboro	W 83–66	1–1	Paul Porter Arena (342); Boiling Springs, NC
November 15, 2022*; 7:00 p.m., ESPN+		at Furman	W 90–57	2–1	Timmons Arena (337); Greenville, SC
November 19, 2022*; 5:30 p.m., ESPN+		Georgia Southern	W 82–78	3–1	Paul Porter Arena (200); Boiling Springs, NC
November 23, 2022*; 3:00 p.m., ESPN+		College of Charleston	W 91–87	4–1	Paul Porter Arena (176); Boiling Springs, NC
November 27, 2022*; 3:00 p.m., SECN+		at Alabama	L 60–89	4–2	Coleman Coliseum (1,898); Tuscaloosa, AL
December 1, 2022*; 12:00 p.m., ESPN+		at Austin Peay	W 62–58	5–2	Dunn Center (1,167); Clarksville, TN
December 3, 2022*; 4:00 p.m.		vs. SMU; Raising the B.A.R. Invitational	L 71–84	5–3	Haas Pavilion (894); Berkeley, CA
December 4, 2022*; 2:00 p.m.		vs. Arkansas–Pine Bluff; Raising the B.A.R. Invitational	W 81–71	6–3	Haas Pavilion; Berkeley, CA
December 12, 2022*; 6:00 p.m., ESPN+		at VCU	W 61–56	7–3	Siegel Center (457); Richmond, VA
December 15, 2022*; 11:00 a.m., ESPN+		East Carolina	W 67–59	8–3	Paul Porter Arena (1,512); Boiling Springs, NC
December 20, 2022*; 2:00 p.m., ESPN+		at Appalachian State	L 81–87	8–4	Holmes Center (323); Boone, NC
Big South regular season
December 29, 2022; 5:00 p.m., ESPN+		at Charleston Southern	W 86–65	9–4 (1–0)	Buccaneer Field House (189); Charleston, SC
December 31, 2022; 2:00 p.m., ESPN+		High Point	W 67–61	10–4 (2–0)	Paul Porter Arena (234); Boiling Springs, NC
January 4, 2023; 7:00 p.m., ESPN+		Campbell	W 67–61	11–4 (3–0)	Paul Porter Arena (128); Boiling Springs, NC
January 7, 2023; 2:00 p.m., ESPN+		at Radford	W 74–70	12–4 (4–0)	Dedmon Center (713); Radford, VA
January 11, 2023; 7:00 p.m., ESPN+		Presbyterian	W 90–86	13–4 (5–0)	Paul Porter Arena (382); Boiling Springs, NC
January 14, 2023; 2:00 p.m., ESPN+		at UNC Asheville	W 76–45	14–4 (6–0)	Kimmel Arena (531); Asheville, NC
January 18, 2023; 7:00 p.m., ESPN+		Longwood	W 83–71	15–4 (7–0)	Paul Porter Arena (367); Boiling Springs, NC
January 21, 2023; 2:00 p.m., ESPN+		UNC Asheville	W 74–54	16–4 (8–0)	Paul Porter Arena (393); Boiling Springs, NC
January 25, 2023; 7:00 p.m., ESPN+		at USC Upstate	W 81–56	17–4 (9–0)	G. B. Hodge Center (163); Spartanburg, SC
January 28, 2023; 2:00 p.m., ESPN+		at High Point	W 86–68	18–4 (10–0)	Qubein Center (1,141); High Point, NC
February 1, 2023; 7:00 p.m., ESPN+		Charleston Southern	W 97–63	19–4 (11–0)	Paul Porter Arena (388); Boiling Springs, NC
February 4, 2023; 2:00 p.m., ESPN+		at Presbyterian	W 82–56	20–4 (12–0)	Templeton Physical Education Center (408); Clinton, SC
February 8, 2023; 7:00 p.m., ESPN+		Radford	W 70–49	21–4 (13–0)	Paul Porter Arena (397); Boiling Springs, NC
February 11, 2023; 2:00 p.m., ESPN+		at Campbell	W 63–50	22–4 (14–0)	Gore Arena (1,225); Buies Creek, NC
February 15, 2023; 6:00 p.m., ESPN+		at Winthrop	W 68–56	23–4 (15–0)	Winthrop Coliseum (128); Rock Hill, SC
February 18, 2023; 2:00 p.m., ESPN+		UNC Asheville	W 82–58	24–4 (16–0)	Paul Porter Arena (693); Boiling Springs, NC
February 22, 2023; 7:00 p.m., ESPN3		at Longwood	W 89–72	25–4 (17–0)	Willett Hall (375); Farmville, VA
February 25, 2023; 2:00 p.m., ESPN+		USC Upstate	W 68–56	26–4 (18–0)	Paul Porter Arena (918); Boiling Springs, NC
Big South women's tournament
March 2, 2023; 12:00 p.m., ESPN+	(1)	vs. (8) UNC Asheville; Quarterfinals	W 82–58	27–4	Bojangles Coliseum; Charlotte, NC
March 4, 2023; 6:00 p.m., ESPN+	(1)	vs. (4) Radford; Semifinals	W 89–81 ^{OT}	28–4	Bojangles Coliseum (1); Charlotte, NC
March 5, 2023; 6:00 p.m., ESPNU	(1)	vs. (2) High Point; Championship Game	W 74–61	29–4	Bojangles Coliseum (1,622); Charlotte, NC
NCAA Women's Tournament
March 17, 2023*; 7:30 p.m., ESPNU	(15 G2)	at (2 G2) No. 8 Utah; First Round	L 77–103	29–5	Jon M. Huntsman Center (7,130); Salt Lake City, UT
*Non-conference game. ^{#}Rankings from AP Poll. (#) Tournament seedings in parentheses. G2=Greenville 2. All times are in Eastern Time.

== See also ==
- 2022–23 Gardner–Webb Runnin' Bulldogs men's basketball team
