= Firestone Fieldhouse =

Arena in Malibu, California, United States

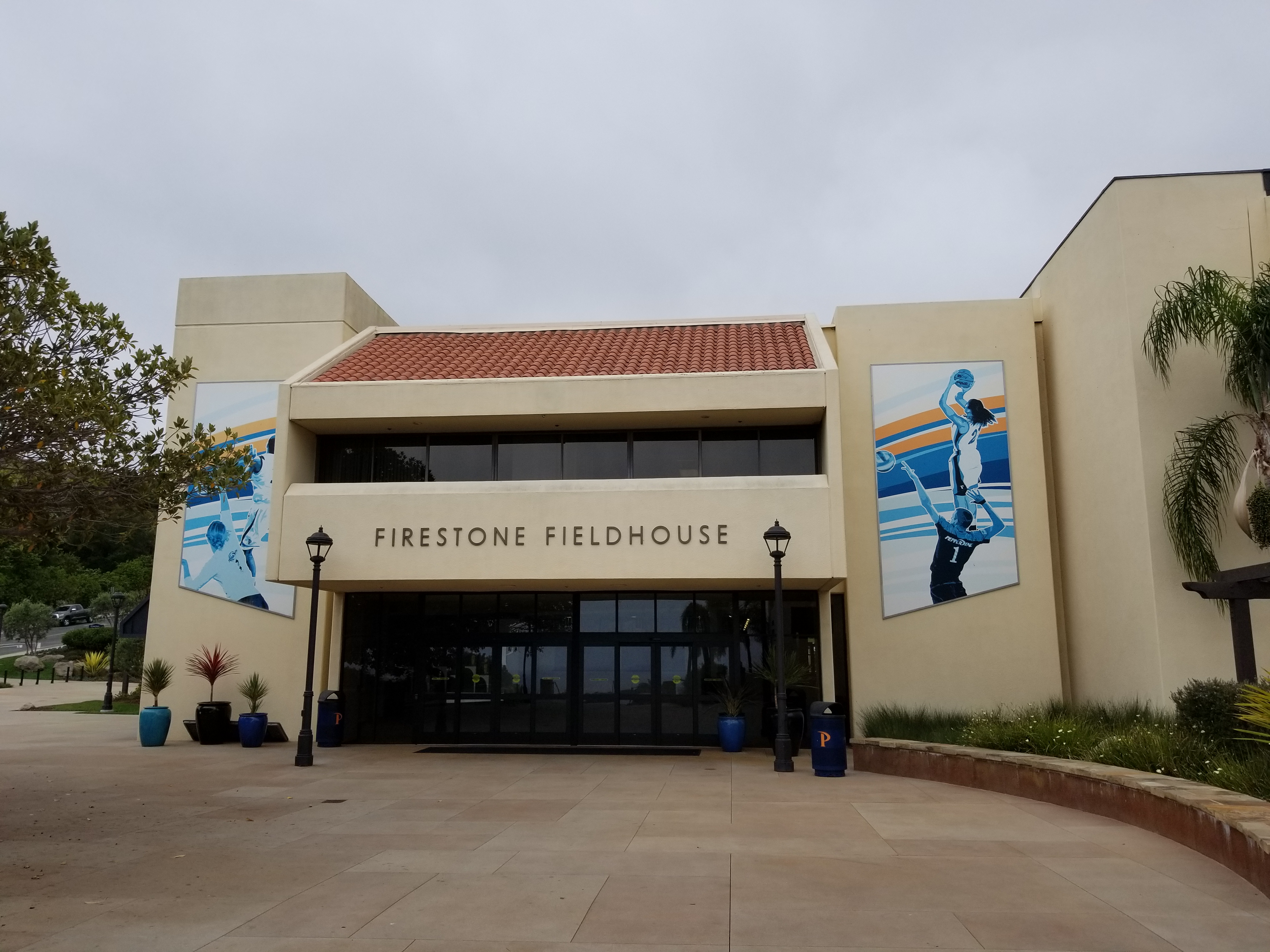
- Interactive map of Firestone Fieldhouse
- Location: Malibu, CA
- Coordinates: 34.038571°N 118.709625°W
- Owner: Pepperdine University
- Operator: Pepperdine University
- Capacity: 3,104

Construction
- Opened: 1973

Tenants
- Pepperdine Waves men's basketball (NCAA); Pepperdine Waves women's basketball (NCAA); Pepperdine Waves men's volleyball (NCAA); Pepperdine Waves women's volleyball (NCAA)

Firestone Fieldhouse is a multi-purpose arena in Malibu, California, on the campus of Pepperdine University. It was built in 1973 as the home to the Pepperdine Waves basketball and volleyball teams, who still play at the Fieldhouse today. It seats 3,104 for sporting events and up to 5,000 for concerts, graduation ceremonies, and lectures.

The Fieldhouse was officially dedicated on September 20, 1975, by President Gerald R. Ford. A year later, 4,500 fans crowded the Fieldhouse to see Pepperdine defeat the UNLV Runnin' Rebels basketball team by a score of 93–91.

The floor at Firestone Fieldhouse, which measures 110 feet (34 m) by 110 feet (12,100 square feet) has been replaced twice. The current floor at the arena is a wooden floor.

== See also ==
- List of NCAA Division I basketball arenas
