= Stacy McIntyre =

American basketball coach

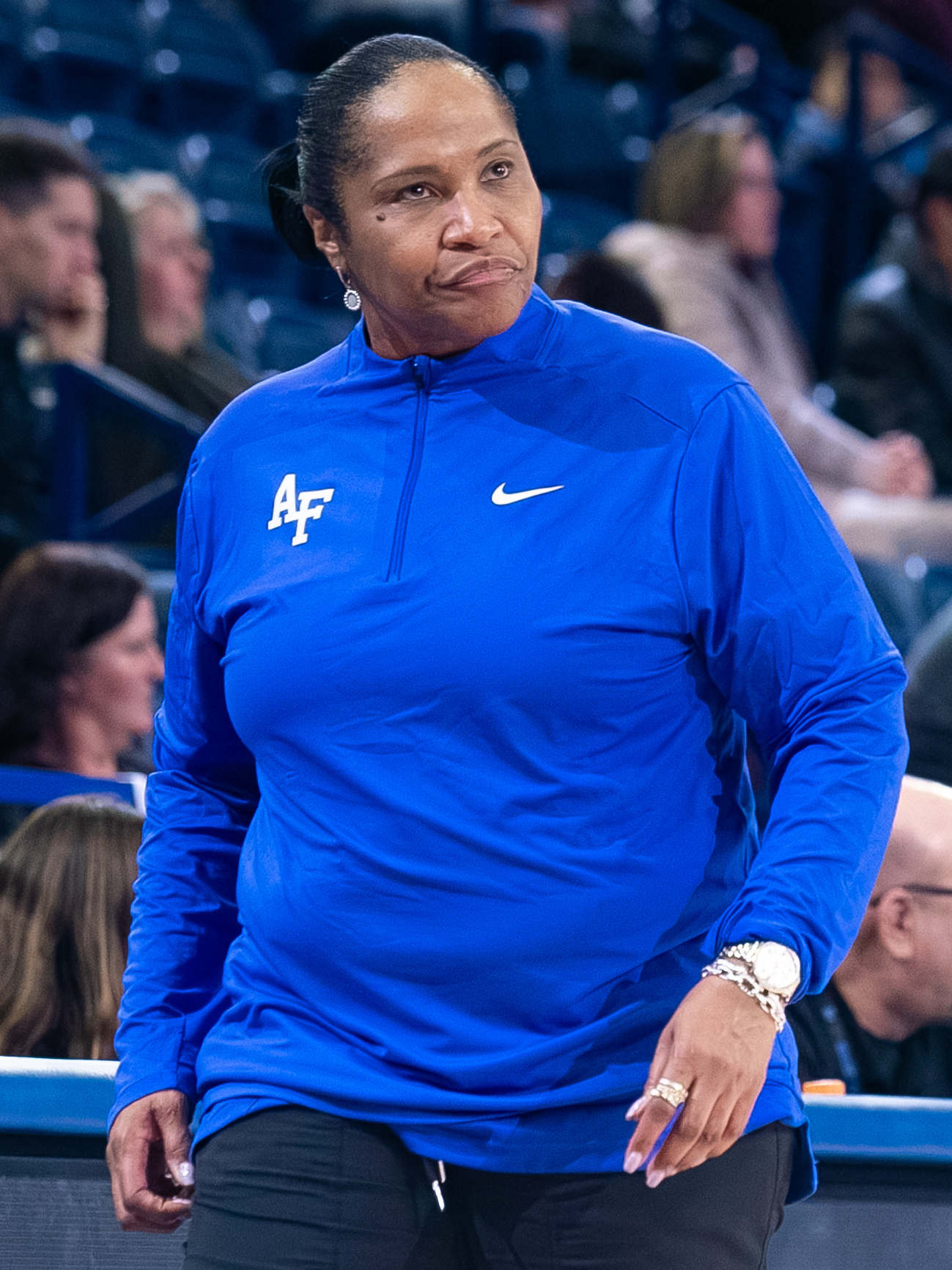
- McIntyre with Air Force in 2024

Current position
- Title: Head coach
- Team: Air Force
- Conference: Mountain West
- Record: 36–36 (.500)

Playing career
- 1988–1992: Kentucky

Coaching career (HC unless noted)
- 2014–2015: Yale (assistant)
- 2015–2018: Air Force (assistant)
- 2018–2024: Air Force (associate HC)
- 2024–present: Air Force

Head coaching record
- Overall: 36–36 (.500)
- Tournaments: 0–2 (WNIT)

Stacy McIntyre is an American women's basketball coach and former player currently serving as the head coach of the Air Force Falcons women's basketball team. She was appointed as the program's head coach on April 25, 2024, following the retirement of Chris Gobrecht.

== Early life ==
McIntyre attended Scott County High School, located in Georgetown, Kentucky, where she participated as a two sport athlete. In 2018, she was inducted into the school's athletics Hall of Fame.

== Playing career ==
McIntyre played forward for the Kentucky Wildcats, with a playing career starting in 1988 and ending in 1992. She played under Sharon Fanning, then in her second year at Kentucky. As a sophomore, she helped the team win the 1990 WNIT. She served as a captain on the team in her junior and senior years. She led the team in scoring as a junior averaging 15.0 points per game and again as a senior averaging 16.1 points per game.

She was named to the SEC all-tournament team in 1992, as well as the SEC academic honor roll in 1992.

=== College stats ===
Year	Team	GP	Points	FG%	3P%	FT%	RPG	APG	SPG	PPG
1988–89	Kentucky	26	62	36.1%	0.0%	50.0%	3.6	0.7	0.6	2.4
1989–90	Kentucky	31	236	38.3%	15.4%	64.4%	7.9	1.5	2.1	7.6
1990–91	Kentucky	29	434	44.3%	29.6%	74.7%	7.1	2.5	1.9	15.0
1991–92	Kentucky	30	483	48.1%	33.0%	78.4%	6.6	2.4	1.2	16.1
Career		116	1215	43.7%	30.5%	71.2%	4.6	1.8	1.6	10.5

== Coaching career ==
McIntyre started her career at Nevada in 2004, where she was involved in the recruiting process. She moved to USC in 2007, where she was involved in recruiting and NCAA compliance matters.

In 2014, she became an assistant coach working for Chris Gobrecht at Yale. She followed Gobrecht to Air Force in 2015 where she served as an assistant coach, then was promoted to associate head coach in 2018.

In 2024, Gobrecht retired and Air Force named McIntyre as the new head women's basketball coach. In her first season as head coach, McIntyre lead the Falcons to a 7th-place finish in the conference, 18 wins, and only their second ever postseason appearance in the Women's National Invitation Tournament.

In 2025, McIntyre led the Falcons to a 9th-place finish in the conference and a 13–17 overall record. However, the Falcons went on a late-season run, winning three of four games in the Mountain West tournament and advancing to the program's first-ever Mountain West championship game. They fell 56–42 to Colorado State. The Falcons were invited to appear in the Women's National Invitation Tournament for only their third time in program history.

== Head coaching record ==
Record table
Season	Team	Overall	Conference	Standing	Postseason
Air Force Falcons (Mountain West) (2024–present)
2024–25	Air Force	18–15	7–11	T–7th	WNIT First Round
2025–26	Air Force	16–19	7–13	T–8th	WNIT First Round
2026–27	Air Force	2–2	0–0		
Air Force:		36–36 (.500)	14–24 (.368)		
Total:		36–36 (.500)			
National champion Postseason invitational champion Conference regular season champion Conference regular season and conference tournament champion Division regular season champion Division regular season and conference tournament champion Conference tournament champion
