= 1979 AIAW National Small College Basketball Championship =

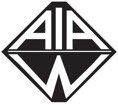

Tournament information
- Dates: March 20, 1979–March 24, 1979
- Administrator: Association for Intercollegiate Athletics for Women
- Host(s): North Dakota State University
- Venue(s): Fargo, North Dakota
- Participants: 16

Final positions
- Champions: South Carolina State (1st title)
- Runner-up: Dayton

Tournament statistics
- Matches played: 16

The 1979 AIAW National Small College Basketball Championship was the fifth annual tournament hosted by the Association for Intercollegiate Athletics for Women to determine the national champion of collegiate basketball among its small college members in the United States.

The tournament was held at North Dakota State University in Fargo, North Dakota between March 20–24, 1979.

South Carolina State defeated Dayton in the championship game, 73–68, to capture the Lady Bulldogs' first AIAW small college national title. It is the only recognised national championship in the school's history.

Sixteen teams participated in a single-elimination tournament that additionally included a third-place final for the two teams that lost in the semifinal games.

== Tournament bracket ==
First round
Niagara	56
San Francisco	52
Morris Harvey	84
SE Louisiana	81
Dayton	84
Air Force	71
High Point	93
North Dakota State	40
Tuskegee	80
Eastern Washington	71
Tougaloo	69
Pepperdine	41
Seton Hall	74
Texas Wesleyan	58
South Carolina State	86
Emporia State	47

Quarterfinals
Niagara	78
Morris Harvey	73
Dayton	75
High Point	65
Tuskegee	75
Tougaloo	57
Seton Hall	53
South Carolina State	91

Semifinals
Niagara	59
Dayton	76
Tuskegee	70
South Carolina State	85

National championship
Dayton	68
South Carolina State	73
Third place final
Niagara	71
Tuskegee	55

== See also ==
- 1979 AIAW National Large College Basketball Championship
