= 1977 AIAW National Small College Basketball Championship =

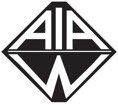

Tournament information
- Dates: March 22, 1977–March 26, 1977
- Administrator: Association for Intercollegiate Athletics for Women
- Host(s): California State Polytechnic University, Pomona
- Venue(s): Pomona, California
- Participants: 16

Final positions
- Champions: Southeastern Louisiana (1st title)
- Runner-up: Phillips (OK)

Tournament statistics
- Matches played: 16

The 1977 AIAW National Small College Basketball Championship was the third annual tournament hosted by the Association for Intercollegiate Athletics for Women to determine the national champion of collegiate basketball among its small college members in the United States.

The tournament was held at Cal Poly Pomona in Pomona, California between March 22 and March 26, 1977.

Southeastern Louisiana defeated Phillips (OK) in the championship game, 92–76, to capture the Lions' first AIAW small college national title.

Sixteen teams participated in a single-elimination tournament that additionally included a third-place final for the two teams that lost in the semifinal games.

== Tournament bracket ==
First round
Biola	69
West Georgia	68
Francis Marion	77
Ursinus	66
Phillips (OK)	95
Eastern Connecticut	64
Ashland	57
Colorado College	47
SE Louisiana	91
Dayton	50
High Point	114
Salisbury State	50
Cal Poly Pomona	82
Eastern Montana	47
Berry (GA)	91
Tarkio	75

Quarterfinals
Biola	69
Francis Marion	64
Phillips (OK)	84
Ashland	61
SE Louisiana	112
High Point	85
Cal Poly Pomona	66
Berry (GA)	86

Semifinals
Biola	58
Phillips (OK)	74
SE Louisiana	86
Berry (GA)	81

National championship
Phillips (OK)	76
SE Louisiana	92
Third place final
Biola	60
Berry (GA)	86

== See also ==
- 1977 AIAW National Large College Basketball Championship
