= Seton Hall Pirates women's basketball =

Seton Hall Pirates
2026–27 Seton Hall Pirates women's basketball team
- University: Seton Hall University
- Head coach: Anthony Bozzella (14th season)
- Location: South Orange, New Jersey
- Arena: Walsh Gymnasium (capacity: 1,316)
- Conference: Big East
- Nickname: Pirates
- Colors: Blue and white

NCAA Division I tournament Sweet Sixteen
- 1994

NCAA Division I tournament appearances
- 1994, 1995, 2015, 2016

AIAW tournament quarterfinals
- Division II; 1979
Other AIAW tournament results
Appearances	Division II; 1975, 1976, 1978, 1979

Conference regular-season champions
- 1996, 2015

The Seton Hall Pirates women's basketball team represents Seton Hall University in South Orange, New Jersey, United States. The school's team currently competes in the Big East where it has competed since the 1982–83 season. Under coach Sue Dilley, the women’s basketball team began competing in 1973-74, obtaining a 9-4 record and its first winning season. The Pirates are currently coached by Anthony Bozzella.

== Year by year results ==
Record table
Season	Coach	Overall	Conference	Standing	Postseason
Sue Dilley (1973–1985)
1973–74	Sue Dilley	9–4			
1974–75	Sue Dilley	13–5			AIAW-Small College 1st Round
1975–76	Sue Dilley	14–8			AIAW-Small College 1st Round
1976–77	Sue Dilley	12–10			
1977–78	Sue Dilley	21–8			AIAW Small College first round
1978–79	Sue Dilley	26–8			AIAW Small College Quarterfinals
1979–80	Sue Dilley	21–7			AIAW
1980–81	Sue Dilley	25–5			AIAW
1981–82	Sue Dilley	18–12			AIAW
Big East Conference (1982–present)
1982–83	Sue Dilley	11–16	3–5	T-6th	
1983–84	Sue Dilley	17–13	5–3	T-3rd	
1984–85	Sue Dilley	4–25	2–14	9th	
Sue Dilley:		191–121 (.612)	10–22 (.313)		
Phyllis Mangina (1985–2010)
1985–86	Phyllis Mangina	5–23	2–14	9th	
1986–87	Phyllis Mangina	12–17	3–13	8th	
1987–88	Phyllis Mangina	10–19	4–12	8th	
1988–89	Phyllis Mangina	18–10	9–7	4th	
1989–90	Phyllis Mangina	21–7	11–5	3rd	
1990–91	Phyllis Mangina	18–11	7–9	5th	
1991–92	Phyllis Mangina	14–15	5–13	T-8th	
1992–93	Phyllis Mangina	14–13	8–10		
1993–94	Phyllis Mangina	27–5	16–2	2nd	NCAA Sweet Sixteen
1994–95	Phyllis Mangina	24–9	12–6	3rd	NCAA Round of 32
1995–96	Phyllis Mangina	16–13	9–9	T-4th (T-1st BE7)	
1996–97	Phyllis Mangina	10–17	7–11	10th (5th BE7)	
1997–98	Phyllis Mangina	8–19	6–12	T-9th (T-4th BE7)	
1998–99	Phyllis Mangina	6–21	3–15	T-12th	
1999–00	Phyllis Mangina	11–16	5–11	T-9th	
2000–01	Phyllis Mangina	16–12	9–7	6th	
2001–02	Phyllis Mangina	15–14	6–10	T-9th	
2002–03	Phyllis Mangina	14–15	7–9	8th	WNIT 1st Round
2003–04	Phyllis Mangina	15–15	6–10	10th	WNIT Round of 16
2004–05	Phyllis Mangina	14–14	6–10	9th	
2005–06	Phyllis Mangina	6–21	3–13	T-13th	
2006–07	Phyllis Mangina	19–12	9–7	T-8th	WNIT 1st Round
2007–08	Phyllis Mangina	13–15	3–13	T-14th	
2008–09	Phyllis Mangina	17–14	4–12	T-13th	
2009–10	Phyllis Mangina	9–21	1–15	16th	
Phyllis Mangina:		352–368 (.489)	161–255 (.387)		
Anne Donovan (2010–2013)
2010–11	Anne Donovan	8–22	1–15	16th	
2011–12	Anne Donovan	8–23	1–15	15th	
2012–13	Anne Donovan	11–20	5–11	T-11th	
Anne Donovan:		27–65 (.293)	7–41 (.146)		
Anthony Bozzella (2013–present)
2013–14	Anthony Bozzella	20–14	8–10	7th	WNIT 3rd Round
2014–15	Anthony Bozzella	28-6	15–3	T-1st	NCAA round of 64
2015–16	Anthony Bozzella	23–9	12–6	T-2nd	NCAA round of 64
2016–17	Anthony Bozzella	12-19	4–14	T-7th	
2017–18	Anthony Bozzella	16-16	7–11	7th	WNIT First round
Anthony Bozzella:		87–45 (.659)	46–44 (.511)		
Total:		669–618 (.520)			
National champion Postseason invitational champion Conference regular season champion Conference regular season and conference tournament champion Division regular season champion Division regular season and conference tournament champion Conference tournament champion

== Postseason Results ==
=== NCAA Division I ===
Year	Seed	Round	Opponent	Result
1994	#4	First Round; Second Round; Sweet Sixteen	#13 Vermont #5 Texas #1 Penn State	W 70-60; W 71-66; L 60-64
1995	#6	First Round; Second Round	#11 Stephen F. Austin #3 North Carolina	W 73-63; L 45-59
2015	#9	First Round	#8 Rutgers	L 66-79
2016	#8	First Round	#9 Duquesne	L 76-97

=== AIAW College Division/Division II ===
The Pirates made two appearances in the AIAW National Division II basketball tournament, with a combined record of 1–2.

Year	Round	Opponent	Result
1978	First Round	Berry	L, 69–70
1979	First Round; Quarterfinals	Texas Wesleyan; South Carolina State	W, 74–58; L, 53–91

=== WBIT ===
Year	Seed	Round	Opponent	Result
2026		First Round	#4 Missouri	L, 57–67

== Retired numbers ==
Seton Hall Pirates retired numbers
No.	Player	Position	Career	Year of Retirement
12	Jodi Brooks	G	1990-94	1994
32	Robin Cunningham	F	1974-78	1981

== Roster ==
2026–27 Seton Hall Pirates women's basketball team
Players
Coaches

Pos.	#	Name	Height	Year	Previous school	Hometown
G	0	Saniyah King	5 ft 7 in (1.7 m)	Jr	Mississippi State	Washington, D.C.
G	1	Ari Woodard	5 ft 8 in (1.73 m)	So	Lake Highland Prep	Oviedo, FL
G	2	Ja'Kahla Craft	5 ft 9 in (1.75 m)	Jr	St. Michael-Albertville	Elk River, MN
G	3	Samari Bankhead	6 ft 0 in (1.83 m)	So	UCF	Los Angeles, CA
F/C	4	Savanna Jones	6 ft 2 in (1.88 m)	Sr	NDSCS	Eden Prairie, MN
G	5	Savannah Catalon	5 ft 8 in (1.73 m)	Sr	Mansfield Legacy	Mansfield, TX
G	7	Giselle Dollar	5 ft 6 in (1.68 m)	Fr	Roosevelt	Seattle, WA
G	13	Ari Vidales	5 ft 10 in (1.78 m)	Fr	Life Prep Academy	Monterrey, Mexico
F	20	Inieye Oruh	6 ft 4 in (1.93 m)	Fr	Centennial	Las Vegas, NV
G/F	21	Shailyn Pinkney	5 ft 10 in (1.78 m)	GS	East Hartford	East Hartford, CT
F	23	Jada Crawshaw	6 ft 0 in (1.83 m)	Sr	Georgia Tech	Darwin, Australia
F	25	Shamira Morton	6 ft 3 in (1.91 m)	Fr	Canton	Canton, MS
G/F	35	Jada Snow	5 ft 10 in (1.78 m)	So	Sanford	Bear, DE
C	44	Kenadie Maughan	6 ft 5 in (1.96 m)	Fr	Uintah	Vernal, UT

Head coach

- Anthony Bozzella (Seton Hall)

Assistant coach(es)

- Jose Rebimbas (Seton Hall)
- Cassandra Callaway (Albany)
- Ka-Deidre Simmons (Seton Hall)

Legend

- (C) Team captain
- (S) Suspended
- (I) Ineligible
- (W) Walk-on
- Injured
- Current redshirt

Roster
Last update: September 6, 2026
