= 1978 AIAW National Small College Basketball Championship =

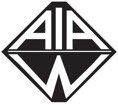

Tournament information
- Administrator: Association for Intercollegiate Athletics for Women
- Host(s): Francis Marion College
- Venue(s): Florence, South Carolina
- Participants: 16

Final positions
- Champions: High Point (1st title)
- Runner-up: South Carolina State

Tournament statistics
- Matches played: 16

The 1978 AIAW National Small College Basketball Championship was the fourth annual tournament hosted by the Association for Intercollegiate Athletics for Women to determine the national champion of collegiate basketball among its small college members in the United States.

The tournament was held at Francis Marion College in Florence, South Carolina.

High Point defeated South Carolina State in the championship game, 92–88, to capture the Panthers' first AIAW small college national title.

Sixteen teams participated in a single-elimination tournament that additionally included a third-place final for the two teams that lost in the semifinal games.

== Tournament bracket ==
First round
SE Louisiana	111
Francis Marion	90
South Carolina State	88
Eastern Washington	53
Pepperdine	65
Fordham	63
Biola	87
Shorter	81
Berry (GA)	70
Seton Hall	69
Midland Lutheran	87
Dayton	86
High Point	104
Eastern New Mexico	85
William Penn	86
Arkansas–Monticello	52

Quarterfinals
SE Louisiana	98
South Carolina State	100
Pepperdine	60
Biola	96
Berry (GA)	97
Midland Lutheran	87
High Point	66
William Penn	65

Semifinals
South Carolina State	88
Biola	78
Berry (GA)	77
High Point	105

National championship
South Carolina State	88
High Point	92
Third place final
Biola	79
Berry (GA)	99

== See also ==
- 1978 AIAW National Large College Basketball Championship
