= Phyllis Mangina =

American college basketball coach (born 1959)

Biographical details
- Born: January 3, 1959 (age 67); Orange, New Jersey, U.S.

Playing career
- 1977–1981: Seton Hall
- Position: Point guard

Coaching career (HC unless noted)
- 1981–1982: Wagner (asst.)
- 1982–1985: Seton Hall (asst.)
- 1985–2010: Seton Hall
- 2012–2018: Saint Peter's (asst.)

Head coaching record
- Overall: 352–368 (.489)
- Tournaments: NCAA Division I: 3–2 (.600); WNIT: 2–3 (.400)

Accomplishments and honors

Championships
- Big East 7 (1996)

Awards
- 2× Big East Coach of the Year (1990, 1994)

Phyllis Ann Mangina (/mændʒɪnæ/; born January 3, 1959) is an American college basketball coach who was most recently an assistant women's basketball coach at Saint Peter's. Previously, she was head coach at Seton Hall from 1985 to 2010. Mangina was first a star basketball and softball player at Seton Hall, and later returned to her alma mater as an assistant, before assuming a leading role as head coach in 1985.

== Early life and education ==
Born and raised in Orange, New Jersey, Mangina graduated from East Orange Catholic High School in 1977. At Seton Hall University, a Catholic university in nearby South Orange, Mangina played at point guard on the Seton Hall Pirates women's basketball team from 1977 to 1981, during which Seton Hall went 93–28 and made the postseason every year, including the 1978 AIAW national final. She also played on the softball team.

== Coaching career ==
=== Assistant coach (1981–1985) ===
After graduating from Seton Hall in 1981, Mangina became an assistant coach at Wagner College in Staten Island for a season before returning to Seton Hall as an assistant coach under her former coach Sue Regan. After serving as recruiting coordinator at Seton Hall from 1982 to 1985, Seton Hall promoted Mangina to head coach after Regan became associate athletic director.

=== Seton Hall (1985–2010) ===
As head coach of Seton Hall from 1985 to 2010, Mangina led Seton Hall to two NCAA tournament appearances (1994 and 1995) and three Women's National Invitation Tournament appearances (2003, 2004, and 2007). The second women's basketball head coach in program history, Mangina has the winningest basketball coaching record at Seton Hall with an overall record of 341–345. She coached three honorable mention All-Americans and 18 All Big East selections. During the 1994–95 season, the Pirates went 24-9 earning the program's second consecutive 20-win season and tournament appearance. The 1994 team spent 10 weeks in the Top 25.

In the 1993–94 season, Seton Hall had its best season ever at 27–5 (16–2, second in the Big East) and finished the year ranked no. 14 in both the AP and USA Today Coaches Polls.

After the 1997–98 season, in which the team finished 8–19, five players, including leading scorer Danielle Golay and starting point guard Christine Koren, decided to transfer.

On March 15, 2010, Mangina resigned from Seton Hall.

=== Saint Peter's assistant (2012–2018) ===
In 2012, Mangina returned to coaching as an assistant at Saint Peter's, another Catholic university program in northern New Jersey, under head coach Pat Coyle. Going 19–132 through six seasons, Coyle resigned following the 2017–18 season, and the new head coach did not retain Mangina on staff.

== Head coaching record ==
Record table
| Season | Team | Overall | Conference | Standing | Postseason |
|---|---|---|---|---|---|
Seton Hall Pirates (Big East Conference) (1985–2010)
| 1985–86 | Seton Hall | 5–23 | 2–14 | 9th | |
| 1986–87 | Seton Hall | 12–17 | 3–13 | 8th | |
| 1987–88 | Seton Hall | 10–19 | 4–12 | 8th | |
| 1988–89 | Seton Hall | 18–10 | 9–7 | T–4th | |
| 1989–90 | Seton Hall | 21–7 | 11–5 | 3rd | |
| 1990–91 | Seton Hall | 18–11 | 7–9 | 5th | |
| 1991–92 | Seton Hall | 14–15 | 5–13 | T–8th | |
| 1992–93 | Seton Hall | 14–13 | 8–10 | 6th | |
| 1993–94 | Seton Hall | 27–5 | 16–2 | 2nd | NCAA Sweet 16 |
| 1994–95 | Seton Hall | 24–9 | 12–6 | 3rd | NCAA second round |
| 1995–96 | Seton Hall | 16–13 | 9–9 | T–1st (Big East 7) | |
| 1996–97 | Seton Hall | 10–17 | 7–11 | 5th (Big East 7) | |
| 1997–98 | Seton Hall | 8–19 | 6–12 | T–4th (Big East 7) | |
| 1998–99 | Seton Hall | 6–21 | 3–13 | 13th | |
| 1999–2000 | Seton Hall | 11–16 | 5–11 | T–9th | |
| 2000–01 | Seton Hall | 16–12 | 9–7 | 6th | |
| 2001–02 | Seton Hall | 15–14 | 6–10 | T–9th | |
| 2002–03 | Seton Hall | 14–15 | 7–9 | 8th | WNIT First Round |
| 2003–04 | Seton Hall | 15–15 | 6–10 | 8th | WNIT Second Round |
| 2004–05 | Seton Hall | 14–14 | 6–10 | 9th | |
| 2005–06 | Seton Hall | 6–21 | 3–13 | T–13th | |
| 2006–07 | Seton Hall | 19–12 | 9–7 | T–8th | WNIT second round |
| 2007–08 | Seton Hall | 13–14 | 3–13 | T–14th | |
| 2008–09 | Seton Hall | 17–14 | 4–12 | T–13th | |
| 2009–10 | Seton Hall | 9–21 | 1–15 | 16th | |
| Seton Hall: | | 352–368 (.489) | 161–253 (.389) | | |
| Total: | | 352–368 (.489) | | | |
National champion Postseason invitational champion Conference regular season champion Conference regular season and conference tournament champion Division regular season champion Division regular season and conference tournament champion Conference tournament champion
