= 1977 AIAW National Large College Basketball Championship =

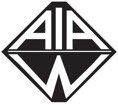

Tournament information
- Dates: March 23, 1977–March 27, 1977
- Administrator: Association for Intercollegiate Athletics for Women
- Host: University of Minnesota
- Venue: Minneapolis, Minnesota
- Participants: 16

Final positions
- Champions: Delta State (3rd title)
- Runner-up: LSU

Tournament statistics
- Matches played: 27

The 1977 AIAW women's basketball tournament was held on March 23–26, 1977. The host site was the University of Minnesota in Minneapolis, Minnesota. Sixteen teams participated, and Delta State University was crowned national champion at the conclusion of the tournament for the third straight season. This was the last year that the women's basketball tournament was held as a sixteen-team single-site event held in one week.

The 1976–1977 season also marked the release of the first AP Poll for women's basketball. Delta State finished first in the final poll, which was released prior to the 1977 AIAW Tournament.

== Tournament bracket ==
=== Main bracket ===
First round* March 23, 1977
Delta State	87
Minnesota	42
Southern Connecticut	80
Missouri	64
Tennessee	76
Michigan State	62
Kansas State	70
Utah	32
Immaculata	83
Tennessee Tech	73
Mississippi College	97
Cal State Fullerton	84
LSU	91
Western Washington	53
Saint Joseph's	75
Baylor	85

Quarterfinals*; March 24, 1977
Delta State	75
Southern Connecticut	49
Tennessee	81
Kansas State	69
Immaculata	100
Mississippi College	78
LSU	71
Baylor	64

Semifinals; March 25, 1977
Delta State	62
Tennessee	58
Immaculata	68
LSU	74

Final; March 26, 1977
Delta State	68
LSU	55
Third place
Tennessee	91
Immaculata	71

*Losers in the first round and quarterfinals continued in the consolation bracket (below)

=== Consolation bracket ===
First round March 24, 1977
Minnesota	39
Missouri	60
Michigan State	62
Utah	63
Tennessee Tech	70
Cal State Fullerton	67
Western Washington	51
Saint Joseph's	97

Second round March 25, 1977
Baylor	85
Missouri	75
Mississippi College	63
Utah	83
Kansas State	58
Tennessee Tech	68
Southern Connecticut	88
Saint Joseph's	85

Third round March 26, 1977
Baylor	77
Utah	52
Tennessee Tech	72
Southern Connecticut	85

Fifth place game March 27, 1977
Baylor	71
Southern Connecticut	69

== See also ==
- 1977 AIAW National Small College Basketball Championship
