= Southeastern Louisiana Lady Lions basketball =

| 2026–27 Southeastern Louisiana Lady Lions basketball team |
- University: Southeastern Louisiana University
- Head coach: Jeff Dow (2nd season)
- Location: Hammond, Louisiana
- Arena: Pride Roofing University Center (capacity: 7,500)
- Conference: Southland
- Nickname: Lady Lions
- Colors: Green and gold

NCAA Division I tournament appearances
- 2023

AIAW tournament champions
- Division II; 1977
Other AIAW tournament results
| Final Four | Division II; 1977, 1978 |
| Quarterfinals | Division II; 1977, 1978 |
| Second round | Division II; 1976, 1977, 1978, 1979 |
| Appearances | Division II; 1976, 1977, 1978, 1979 |

Conference tournament champions
- 2023

Conference regular-season champions
- 2023, 2025

Uniforms
| Home | Away |

For information on all Southeastern Louisiana University sports, see Southeastern Louisiana Lions

The Southeastern Louisiana Lions women's basketball team is the women's basketball team that represents Southeastern Louisiana University in Hammond, Louisiana. The team currently competes in the Southland Conference. The Lions are currently coached by Jeff Dow.

== History ==
The Lady Lions competed in the Small College Division AIAW National Tournament four times. Each tournament had a 16-member field. The team won the tournament and the national championship in 1977. The Lady Lions made Elite Eight and Final Four appearances in the 1977 and 1978 tournaments.

== Postseason ==
=== AIAW College Division/Division II ===
The Lady Lions made four appearances in the AIAW National Division II Basketball Tournament, with a combined record of 5–3.

| Year | Round | Opponent | Result |
|---|---|---|---|
| 1976 | First Round | West Georgia | L, 55–58 |
| 1977 | First Round; Quarterfinals; Semifinals; National Championship | Dayton; High Point; Berry; Phillips | W, 91–50; W, 112–85; W, 86–61; W, 92–76 |
| 1978 | First Round; Quarterfinals | Francis Marion; South Carolina State | W, 111–90; L, 98–100 |
| 1979 | First Round | Charleston (WV) | L, 81–84 |

=== NCAA Division I ===
The Lady Lions have appeared in the NCAA Division I women's basketball tournament once. They have a record of 0–1.

| Year | Round | Opponent | Result |
|---|---|---|---|
| 2023 | First Round | Iowa | L 43–95 |
