= Fordham Rams women's basketball =

American college basketball team

2026–27 Fordham Rams women's basketball team
- University: Fordham University
- Head coach: Neil Harrow (1st season)
- Location: Bronx, New York
- Arena: Rose Hill Gymnasium (capacity: 3,200)
- Conference: Atlantic 10
- Nickname: Rams
- Colors: Maroon and white
- All-time record: 657–763 (.463)

NCAA Division I tournament appearances
- 1994, 2014, 2019

AIAW tournament quarterfinals
- Division I: 1979
Other AIAW tournament results
Appearances	Division I: 1979; Division II: 1978

Conference tournament champions
- Patriot League: 1992, 1994; Atlantic 10 Conference: 2014, 2019

Conference regular-season champions
- Patriot League: 1992, 1994; Atlantic 10 Conference: 2019

Uniforms
Home	Away

The Fordham Rams women's basketball team represents Fordham University, located in the Bronx, New York, in NCAA Division I basketball competition. They currently compete in the Atlantic 10 Conference.

== History ==
Fordham began play in 1970. They joined the Metro Atlantic Athletic Conference in 1981, playing in the conference until 1990 when they joined the Patriot League. They won the conference regular season and tournament titles in 1992 and repeated that sweep in 1994. They then joined the Atlantic-10 Conference in 1995 but struggled mightily until the arrival of Stephanie Gaitley as head coach. Despite recent success, as of the end of the 2018–19 season, the Rams only have an all-time record of 657–763. They have qualified into three NCAA tournaments: The 1994 NCAA Division I women's basketball tournament, the 2014 NCAA Division I women's basketball tournament and the 2019 NCAA Division I women's basketball tournament. They also qualified into the 1979 AIAW National Large College Basketball Championship, a precursor to the NCAA Women's Tournament which did not begin until 1982. There Fordham advanced to the "Elite 8" of that 16 team national tournament but have yet to make it out of the first round of the NCAA tournament. More recently however, under Coach Gaitley, they have advanced into the WNIT's "Sweet 16" on two (2013 and 2018) occasions.

== Postseason ==
=== NCAA Division I ===
Year	Seed	Round	Opponent	Result
1994	#16	First Round	#1 Penn State	L 41–94
2014	#10	First Round	#7 California	L 63–64
2019	#14	First Round	#3 Syracuse	L 49–70

=== AIAW Division I ===
The Rams made one appearance in the AIAW National Division I basketball tournament, with a combined record of 1–1.

Year	Round	Opponent	Result
1979	First Round; Quarterfinals	Long Beach State; Tennessee	W, 62–52; L, 54–76

=== AIAW Division II ===
The Rams made one appearance in the AIAW National Division II basketball tournament, with a combined record of 0–1.

Year	Round	Opponent	Result
1978	First Round	Pepperdine	L, 63–65
