= Air Force Falcons women's basketball =

College women's basketball team representing the United States Air Force Academy

Air Force Falcons
| 2026–27 Air Force Falcons women's basketball team |
- University: United States Air Force Academy
- Head coach: Stacy McIntyre (3rd season)
- Location: Colorado Springs, Colorado
- Arena: Clune Arena (capacity: 5,939)
- Conference: Mountain West
- Nickname: Falcons
- Colors: Blue and silver

NCAA Division I tournament appearances
- Division II; 1985, 1990

AIAW tournament appearances
- Division II: 1979, 1980

Uniforms
| Home | Away |

The Air Force Falcons women's basketball team is the women's basketball team that represents the United States Air Force Academy in Colorado Springs, Colorado. As of 2024, the team competes in the Mountain West Conference. The Falcons are currently coached by Stacy McIntyre.

The Falcons competed at the Division II level in both the AIAW and NCAA from 1976 to 1996 before joining Division I. They played in the NCAA Division II tournament twice, in 1985 and 1990. In 2022, 2025, and 2026 the Falcons made the WNIT tournament.

== Postseason results ==
=== WNIT tournament ===
The Falcons have made two appearances in the Women's National Invitation Tournament. They have a combined record of 1–3.

| Year | Round | Opponent | Result |
|---|---|---|---|
| 2022 | Round 1 Round 2 | San Francisco; UCLA | W 64–60; L 61–45 |
| 2025 | Round 1 | Utah Valley | L 70-64 |
| 2026 | Round 1 | Northern Colorado | L 79-72 |

=== NCAA Division II tournament ===
The Falcons made two appearances in the NCAA Division II women's basketball tournament. They had a combined record of 0–2.

| Year | Round | Opponent | Result |
|---|---|---|---|
| 1985 | First Round | Abilene Christian | L 61–82 |
| 1990 | First Round | Cal Poly Pomona | L 63–89 |

=== AIAW College Division/Division II tournament ===
The Falcons made two appearances in the AIAW National Division II basketball tournament, with a combined record of 0–2.

| Year | Round | Opponent | Result |
|---|---|---|---|
| 1979 | First Round | Dayton | L 71–84 |
| 1980 | First Round | Langston | L 58–59 |
