= Jen Hoover =

American basketball coach (born 1969)

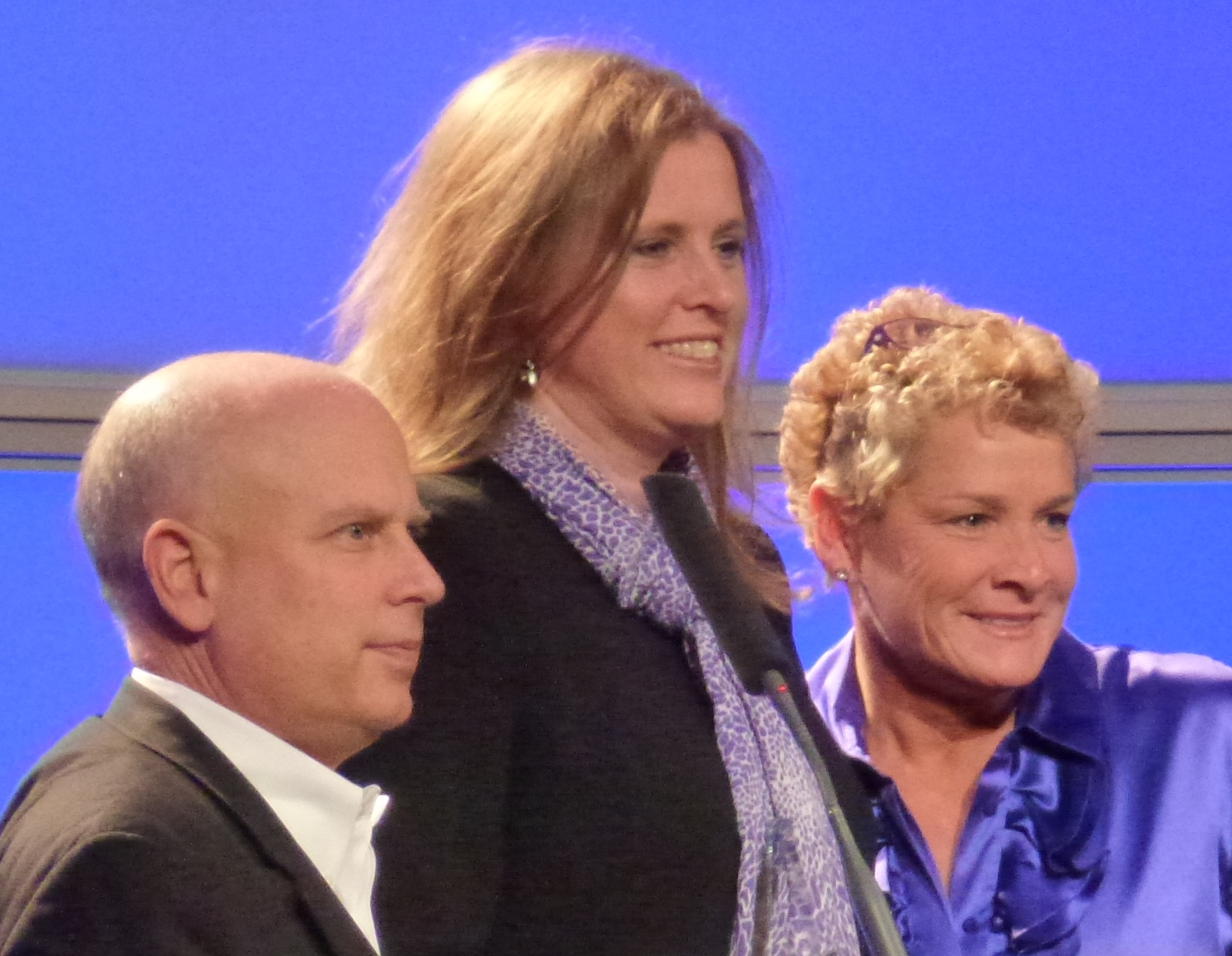
- Hoover in 2012

Current position
- Title: Assistant coach
- Team: Virginia Tech
- Conference: ACC

Biographical details
- Born: October 12, 1969 (age 57); Roanoke, Virginia, U.S.

Playing career
- 1987–1991: Wake Forest

Coaching career (HC unless noted)
- 1994–1996: UMKC (asst.)
- 1996–1998: VCU (asst.)
- 1998–2000: East Carolina (asst.)
- 2000–2002: James Madison (asst.)
- 2002–2003: Memphis (asst.)
- 2003–2004: Virginia (Dir of Ops)
- 2004–2007: Virginia (asst.)
- 2007–2008: Memphis (assoc. HC)
- 2008–2011: California (asst.)
- 2011–2012: High Point
- 2012–2022: Wake Forest
- 2022–2024: Kentucky (asst.)
- 2024-Present: Virginia Tech (asst.)

Head coaching record
- Overall: 162–183 (.470)

Jennifer Hoover (née Mitchell; born October 12, 1969) is currently an assistant coach with the Virginia Tech women's basketball team.

== Career ==
She was previously an assistant coach with the University of Kentucky women's basketball team since her appointment on July 11, 2022.

Before coaching at Kentucky, she was the head coach at Wake Forest University for ten seasons prior to her dismissal two months earlier on May 11. She was succeeded by Megan Gebbia fifteen days later on May 26.

She played her collegiate career at Wake Forest and is the school's leading scorer and rebounder.

== Wake Forest statistics ==
Ratios
Year	Team	GP	FG%	3P%	FT%	RBG	APG	BPG	SPG	PPG
1987–88	Wake Forest	31	57.2%	–	37.8%	5.97	0.48	0.19	0.65	6.35
1988–89	Wake Forest	28	61.7%	–	53.0%	8.11	1.07	0.50	1.21	18.64
1989–90	Wake Forest	30	60.6%	0.0%	24.8%	9.77	1.60	1.33	2.40	15.90
1990–91	Wake Forest	28	61.0%	0.0%	52.4%	10.75	1.25	0.57	1.50	19.00
Career		117	60.7%	0.0%	43.9%	8.60	1.09	0.65	1.44	14.77

Totals
Year	Team	GP	FG	FGA	3P	3PA	FT	FTA	REB	A	BK	ST	PTS
1987–88	Wake Forest	31	83	145	–	–	31	82	185	15	6	20	197
1988–89	Wake Forest	28	221	358	–	–	80	151	227	30	14	34	522
1989–90	Wake Forest	30	226	373	0	3	25	101	293	48	40	72	477
1990–91	Wake Forest	28	233	382	0	2	66	126	301	35	16	42	532
Career		117	763	1258	0	5	202	460	1006	128	76	168	1728

== Awards and honors ==
In 2007, Hoover was named to the Wake Forest Sports Hall of Fame.

In 2012, after leading High Point to a 20–13 record, Hoover was named the Maggie Dixon Division I Rookie Coach of the Year Award, awarded to a coach who achieves great success in their first year as a Division I head coach.

On March 4, 2021, Hoover became the winningest coach in Wake Forest history after beating North Carolina in the 2021 ACC women's basketball tournament. The win gave Hoover 126 total wins as a coach at her alma mater.

== Head coaching record ==
Record table
Season	Team	Overall	Conference	Standing	Postseason
High Point Panthers (Big South Conference) (2011–2012)
2011–12	High Point	20–13	13–5	2nd	WNIT First Round
High Point:		20–13 (.606)	13–5 (.722)		
Wake Forest Demon Deacons (Atlantic Coast Conference) (2012–2022)
2012–13	Wake Forest	13–19	5–13	T–9th	
2013–14	Wake Forest	15–16	5–11	11th	
2014–15	Wake Forest	13–20	2–14	13th	
2015–16	Wake Forest	17–16	6–10	T–9th	WNIT Second Round
2016–17	Wake Forest	16–16	6–10	9th	WNIT Second Round
2017–18	Wake Forest	14–17	5–11	11th	
2018–19	Wake Forest	10–20	1–15	15th	
2019–20	Wake Forest	16–16	7–11	T–11th	
2020–21	Wake Forest	12–13	8–10	T–9th	NCAA first round
2021–22	Wake Forest	16–17	4–14	T–11th	WNIT Second Round
Wake Forest:		142–170 (.455)	49–118 (.293)		
Total:		162–183 (.470)			
National champion Postseason invitational champion Conference regular season champion Conference regular season and conference tournament champion Division regular season champion Division regular season and conference tournament champion Conference tournament champion
