= 2019 Big South Conference women's basketball tournament =

- Classification: Division I
- Season: 2018–19
- Teams: 11
- Site: Campus sites (first round) #1 and #2 seeds (quarterfinals and semifinals); Highest remaining seed (championship)
- Champions: Radford (10th title)
- Winning coach: Mike McGuire (1st title)

2018–19 Big South women's basketball standings
	Conf.				Overall
Team	W		L	PCT	W		L	PCT
Radford †	17	–	1	.944	26	–	6	.813
High Point	15	–	3	.833	22	–	8	.733
Hampton	12	–	6	.667	16	–	14	.533
UNC Asheville	11	–	7	.611	17	–	13	.567
Campbell	10	–	8	.556	20	–	12	.625
Gardner-Webb	10	–	8	.556	16	–	15	.516
Charleston Southern	9	–	9	.500	14	–	17	.452
Winthrop	6	–	12	.333	10	–	20	.333
Presbyterian	4	–	14	.222	7	–	24	.226
USC Upstate	3	–	15	.167	7	–	23	.233
Longwood	2	–	16	.111	3	–	26	.103
† 2019 Big South tournament winner As of March 14, 2019; Rankings from AP poll

The 2019 Big South women's basketball tournament was the postseason women's basketball tournament that ended the 2018–19 season of the Big South Conference. It was held March 12 through March 17, 2019, at various campus sites. Radford won the conference tournament championship game over the Campbell Lady Camels, 57–45, to receive the conference's automatic bid to the NCAA tournament.

== Sites ==
The first round was played at campus sites at the home of the higher seed. The quarterfinals and semifinals were played at #1 and #2 seeds. The championship game was held at the home arena of the higher surviving seed.

== Seeds ==
All 11 conference teams were eligible for the tournament. The top five teams received a first-round bye. Teams were seeded by record within the conference, with a tiebreaker system to seed teams with identical conference records.

Seed	School	Conference	Overall	Tiebreaker
1	Radford	17–1	23–6	
2	High Point	15–3	22–7	
3	Hampton	12–6	16–13	
4	UNC Asheville	11–7	16–13	
5	Gardner–Webb	10–8	16–14	1–0 vs. UNCA
6	Campbell	10–8	18–11	1–1 vs. UNCA
7	Charleston Southern	9–9	12–17	
8	Winthrop	6–12	10–19	
9	Presbyterian	4–14	6–23	
10	USC Upstate	3–15	7–22	
11	Longwood	2–16	3–25	
‡ – Big South regular season champion. Overall records are as of the end of the regular season.

== Schedule ==
Game	Time*	Matchup^{#}	Television	Attendance
First round - Tuesday, March 12 Campus sites
1	7:00 pm	No. 10 USC Upstate at No. 7 Charleston Southern	ESPN3	
2	7:00 pm	No. 11 Longwood at No. 6 Campbell	ESPN3	
3	7:00 pm	No. 9 Presbyterian at No. 8 Winthrop	ESPN3	
Quarterfinals - Thursday, March 14 at #1 and #2 seeds
4	6:00 pm	No. 9 Presbyterian vs. No. 1 Radford	ESPN3	
5	8:00 pm	No. 5 Gardner–Webb vs. No. 4 UNC Asheville	ESPN3	
6	6:00 pm	No. 7 Charleston Southern vs. No. 2 High Point	ESPN3	
7	8:00 pm	No. 6 Campbell vs. No. 3 Hampton	ESPN3	
Semifinals - Friday, March 15 at #1 and #2 seeds
8	6:00 pm	No. 4 UNC Asheville vs. No. 1 Radford	ESPN+	
9	8:00 pm	No. 6 Campbell vs. No. 7 Charleston Southern	ESPN+	
Championship - Sunday, March 17 at Highest Remaining Seed
10	2:00 pm	No. 6 Campbell vs. No. 1 Radford	ESPN+	
*Game times in ET. Rankings denote tournament seeding.

== Bracket ==
First round Tuesday, March 12; ESPN3
8	Winthrop	52
9	Presbyterian	64
7	Charleston Southern	67
10	USC Upstate	52
6	Campbell	54
11	Longwood	49

Quarterfinals; Thursday, March 14; ESPN3
1	Radford	60
9	Presbyterian	49
4	UNC Asheville	72
5	Gardner–Webb	56
2	High Point	61
7	Charleston Southern	65
3	Hampton	63
6	Campbell	85

Semifinals; Friday, March 15; ESPN+
1	Radford	59
4	UNC-Asheville	52
7	Charleston Southern	44
6	Campbell	55

Championship; Sunday, March 17; ESPN+
1	Radford	57
6	Campbell	45

== See also ==
- 2019 Big South Conference men's basketball tournament
