= Dayton Flyers women's basketball =

Dayton Flyers
2026–27 Dayton Flyers women's basketball team
- University: University of Dayton
- Head coach: Tamika Williams-Jeter (3rd season)
- Location: Dayton, Ohio
- Arena: University of Dayton Arena (capacity: 13,435)
- Conference: Atlantic 10
- Nickname: Flyers
- Colors: Red and blue

NCAA Division I tournament Elite Eight
- 2015
Other NCAA Division I tournament results
Sweet Sixteen	2015
Appearances	2010, 2011, 2012, 2013, 2014, 2015, 2017, 2018, 2022

AIAW tournament champions
- Division II: 1980
Other AIAW tournament results
Runner-up	Division II: 1979
Final Four	Division II: 1979, 1980
Quarterfinals	Division II: 1979, 1980
Second round	Division II: 1980
Appearances	Division II: 1977, 1978, 1979, 1980, 1981

Conference tournament champions
- 2012, 2017, 2020

Conference regular-season champions
- 2013, 2014, 2017, 2018, 2020, 2021, 2022

The Dayton Flyers women's basketball team is the NCAA Division 1 basketball team that represents University of Dayton in Dayton, Ohio. The school's team currently competes in the Atlantic 10 Conference. They are currently coached by Tamika Williams-Jeter. The Flyers play their home games at University of Dayton Arena where the official capacity for basketball games is 13,435.

== History ==
The University of Dayton first sponsored women's basketball in 1968 playing in the NCAA's Division II until 1984.

During their tenure in Division II the team won the AIAW National Championship in 1980, was the national runner-up in 1979, as well as winning the 1982 AIAW Midwest Regional Championship, advancing to the NCAA Division II Final Four in 1984, and winning the OAISW State Championship in 1977.

The team then joined the North Star conference in 1984 until moving to the Midwestern Collegiate Conference in 1988 to 1993. In 1995 they moved to the Atlantic 10 Conference where they still reside.

During their time in the Atlantic 10 Conference the team has made 7 NCAA Tournament appearances and 4 NIT appearances.

In 2014–2015 season the team made it to the Regional Finals (Elite 8), the farthest the team has ever gone in the tournament, defeating Iowa State, Kentucky, and Louisville, before losing to the eventual National Champion University of Connecticut Huskies.

The Flyers have won Atlantic 10 conference tournament championships in 2012, 2017, and 2020, and conference regular season championships in 2013, 2014, 2017, 2018, 2020, and 2021. They have advanced to the postseason following the last ten consecutive seasons.

== Coaches ==
The Flyers have had 10 head coaches since their first season in 1968. The current coach was hired in 2022.

Coach	Years	Overall record
Judith Bowman	1968–1970	10–10
R. Elaine Dreidame	1970–1978	108–63 (1 State Championship & 1 Regional Championship)
Maryalyce Jeremiah	1978–1980	69–5 (1 AIAW Div II National Championship)
Linda Makowski	1980–1986	119–59 (2 Div II Tournament appearances)
Sue Ramsey	1986–1994	95–128
Clemette Haskins	1994–1998	35–73
Jaci Clark	1998–2003	67–76
Jim Jabir	2003–2016	210–133 (6 NCAA appearances & 2 WNIT appearances)
Shauna Green	2016–2022	127-50 (4 NCAA appearances & 2 WNIT appearances)
Tamika Williams-Jeter	2022–Present	
Overall record:		839-590 (through 2021–22 regular season)

=== Current coaching staff ===
Name	Position
Tamika Williams-Jeter	Head coach
George Washington	Assistant coach, Recruiting Coordinator
Bryce Agler	Assistant coach
Kalisha Keane	Assistant coach
Trendale Perkins	Video Coordinator
Kaitlyn Zell	Strength and conditioning Coach
Andrew Bacon	Assistant Athletic Trainer
Christina Bacon	Director of Basketball Operations

== Postseason ==
=== NCAA Division I ===
Year	Seed	Round	Opponent	Result
2010	#8	First round Second round	#9 TCU #1 Tennessee	W 67–66; L 64–92
2011	#11	First round	#6 Penn State	L 66–75
2012	#11	First round	#6 Arkansas	L 55–72
2013	#7	First round Second round	#10 St. John's #2 Kentucky	W 96-90 (2OT); L 70–84
2014	#6	First round	#11 Florida	L 69–83
2015	#7	First round Second round Sweet Sixteen; Elite Eight	#10 Iowa State #2 Kentucky #3 Louisville #1 Connecticut	W 78–66; W 99–94; W 82–66; L 70–91
2017	#12	First round	#5 Tennessee	L 57–66
2018	#9	First round	#8 Marquette	L 65–84

=== AIAW College Division/Division II ===
The Flyers made five appearances in the AIAW National Division II basketball tournament, with a combined record of 7–4.

Year	Round	Opponent	Result
1977	First round	Southeastern Louisiana	L, 50–91
1978	First round	Midland Lutheran	L, 86–87
1979	First round Quarterfinals; Semifinals; National Championship	Air Force; High Point; Niagara; South Carolina State	W, 84–71; W, 75–65; W, 76–59; L, 68–73
1980	Second round Quarterfinals; Semifinals; National Championship	Cal State Los Angeles; Cal Poly Pomona; Louisiana College; College of Charleston	W, 105–88; W, 88–79; W, 77–52; W, 83–53
1981	First round	Tuskegee	L, 69–83

== All-time statistical leaders ==
=== Current leaders ===
Points Scored:	Ann Meyers	2672
Assists:	Tammy Stritenberger	593
Rebound:	Ann Meyers	1293
Steals:	Beverly Crusoe	468
Field Goals Made:	Ann Meyers	1051

=== Single season leaders ===
Points Scored:	Ann Meyers	814 (1980)
Rebounds:	JaVonna Layfield	387 (2018)
Assists:	Tammy Stritenberger	208 (1981)
Steals:	Beverly Crusoe	193 (1979)
Field Goals Made:	Ann Meyers	309 (1980)

=== Single game leaders ===
Points Scored:	Donna Burks	43 (1982)
Rebounds:	Janet Deters	27 (1971)
Assists:	Stefanie Miller	14 (2003)
Steals:	Beverly Crusoe	12 (1979)
Field Goals Made:	Donna Burks	18 (1982)
