= High Point Panthers women's basketball =

2026–27 High Point Panthers women's basketball team
- University: High Point University
- Head coach: Wyatt Foust (1st season)
- Location: High Point, North Carolina
- Arena: Qubein Center (capacity: 4,500)
- Conference: Big South
- Nickname: Panthers
- Colors: Purple and white

NCAA Division I tournament Sweet Sixteen
- 1997*

NCAA Division I tournament appearances
- 1997*, 2021, 2025, 2026

AIAW tournament champions
- Division II: 1978
Other AIAW tournament results
Final Four	Division II: 1978
Quarterfinals	Division II: 1977, 1978, 1979
Appearances	Division II: 1977, 1978, 1979

Conference tournament champions
- Carolinas Conference: 1975, 1976, 1977, 1978, 1979, 1995, 1996, 1997; Big South: 2021, 2025, 2026

Conference regular-season champions
- 1995, 2007, 2014, 2021, 2024, 2025, 2026
- * at Division II level

The High Point Panthers women's basketball team is the basketball team that represents High Point University in High Point, North Carolina, United States. The school's team currently competes in the Big South Conference.

== History ==
High Point began play in 1967. They won the 1978 AIAW Division II national championship 92–88 over South Carolina State in overtime. In their time in Division II, they won the Carolinas Conference Tournament in 1976 (24–1 record), 1977 (29–2 record), 1978 (30–8 record), 1979 (33–4 record), 1995 (22–7 record), 1996 (22–7 record), and 1997 (26–6 record). They made the WNIT in 2007, 2012, 2014, and 2019, losing to Charlotte 72–45, NC State 88–78, Bowling Green 72–62, and Ohio 81–74 respectively. At the end of the 2016–17 season, the Panthers have a program record of 772–597. In 2021, the Panthers earned their first appearance in the NCAA tournament by winning the Big South Conference tournament.

== Head coach ==
The Panthers are led by first-year coach Wyatt Foust, who was hired as the new head coach in April 2026 following Chelsea Banbury's departure to VCU. He was hired after spending the last 3 seasons as associate head coach at Murray State.

== Individual career records ==
Record	Amount	Player	Years
Points	2,612	Karen Curtis	1994–98
Points/Game	22.7	Karen Curtis	1994–98
Rebounds/Game	11.2	Cheyenne Parker	2010–13
Assists/Game	5.5	Karen Curtis	1994–98
Blocks/Game	3.5	Cheyenne Parker	2010–13
Steals/Game	2.8	Natelle Henry	2000–03
Field Goal %	.499	Stacia Robertson	2012–15
3-Point %	.406	Mackenzie Maier	2007–11
Free Throw %	.848	Jurica Hargraves	2007–11

== Individual single-season records ==
Record	Amount	Player	Year
Points	778	Karen Curtis	1996–97
Points/Game	25.1	Karen Curtis	1996–97
Rebounds/Game	13.2	Cheyenne Parker	2012–13
Assists/Game	7.7	Dawn Allred	1976–77
Blocks/Game	4.4	Cheyenne Parker	2012–13
Steals/Game	2.9	Natelle Henry	2002–03
Field Goal %	.579	Stacia Robertson	2014–15
3-Point %	.449	Katie Ralls	2005–06
Free Throw %	.902	Jurica Hargraves	2009–10

== Individual awards ==
Big South Player of the Year

- Katie O'Dell – 2005–06
- Stacia Robertson – 2014–15
- Emma Bockrath – 2016–17

Big South Defensive Player of the Year

- Cheyenne Parker – 2011–12, 2012–13

Big South Freshman of the Year

- Nicki Fontleroy – 2000–01
- Mackenzie Maier – 2007–08
- Shamia Brown – 2008–09
- Kaylah Keys – 2013–14

Big South Coach of the Year

- Joe Ellenburg – 2000–01
- Tooey Loy – 2004–05

Big South Scholar-Athlete of the Year

- Gina Rosser – 2002–03
- Leslie Cook – 2005–06, 2006–07

CoSIDA Academic All-American First Team

- Leslie Cook – 2006–07

== Coaches ==
Coaching Records
Name	Years	W–L (%)
Betty Jo Clary	1967–1972	24–29 (.453)
Jennifer Alley	1972–1977	69–46 (.600)
Wanda Briley	1977–1979	63–12 (.840)
Nancy Little	1979–1985	89–71 (.556)
Debbie Trogdon	1985–1988	33–45 (.423)
Joe Ellenburg	1988–2001	208–162 (.562)
Tooey Loy	2001–2011	163–140 (.538)
Jennifer Hoover	2011–2012	20–13 (.606)
DeUnna Hendrix	2012–2019	125–93 (.573)
Chelsea Banbury	2019–2026	38–19 (.667)

== Seasons ==
Statistics overview
Season	Coach	Overall	Conference	Standing	Postseason
AIAW Small College Division Independent (1967–1974)
1967–68	Betty Jo Clary	8–0			
1968–69	Betty Jo Clary	1–11			
1969–70	Betty Jo Clary	1–7			
1970–71	Betty Jo Clary	8–5			
1971–72	Betty Jo Clary	6–6			
1972–73	Jennifer Alley	5–14			
1973–74	Jennifer Alley	4–16			
AIAW Small College Division Carolinas Intercollegiate Athletic Conference (1974–1980)
1974–75	Jennifer Alley	7–13			
1975–76	Jennifer Alley	24–1			
1976–77	Jennifer Alley	29–2			AIAW Small College Quarterfinals
1977–78	Wanda Briley	30–8			AIAW Small College Champions
1978–79	Wanda Briley	33–4			AIAW Small College Quarterfinals
1979–80	Nancy Little	24–8			
NAIA Carolinas Intercollegiate Athletic Conference (1980–1993)
1980–81	Nancy Little	20–10			
1981–82	Nancy Little	11–11			
1982–83	Nancy Little	3–20			
1983–84	Nancy Little	16–8			
1984–85	Nancy Little	15–14			
1985–86	Debbie Trogden	12–14			
1986–87	Debbie Trogden	13–14			
1987–88	Debbie Trogden	8–17			
1988–89	Joe Ellenburg	7–17			
1989–90	Joe Ellenburg	17–12			
1990–91	Joe Ellenburg	15–14			
1991–92	Joe Ellenburg	19–12			
1992–93	Joe Ellenburg	16–13			
Dual membership: NCAA DII and NAIA Carolinas Intercollegiate Athletic Conference (1993–1995)
1993–94	Joe Ellenburg	11–16			
1994–95	Joe Ellenburg	22–7			NAIA Division I First round
NCAA DII Carolinas-Virginia Athletics Conference (1995–1997)
1995–96	Joe Ellenburg	22–7	16–2	2nd	
1996–97	Joe Ellenburg	26–6	17–3	2nd	NCAA Division II Regional final
NCAA DII Independent (1997–1999)
1997–98	Joe Ellenburg	23–4			
1998–99	Joe Ellenburg	10–17			
NCAA Division I Big South Conference (1999–Present)
1999-00	Joe Ellenburg	6–22	3–11	8th	
2000–01	Joe Ellenburg	14–15	8–6	T-2nd	
2001–02	Tooey Loy	13–15	7–7	4th	
2002–03	Tooey Loy	18–12	8–6	3rd	
2003–04	Tooey Loy	14–14	8–6	3rd	
2004–05	Tooey Loy	17–12	11–3	2nd	
2005–06	Tooey Loy	20–10	9–5	2nd	
2006–07	Tooey Loy	18–12	11–3	1st	WNIT First Round
2007–08	Tooey Loy	15–15	6–6	4th	
2008–09	Tooey Loy	15–16	10–6	2nd	
2009–10	Tooey Loy	17–14	9–7	T-3rd	
2010–11	Tooey Loy	16–15	9–7	4th	
2011–12	Jennifer Hoover	20–13	13–5	2nd	WNIT First Round
2012–13	DeUnna Hendrix	17–13	11–7	T-4th	
2013–14	DeUnna Hendrix	22–11	16–4	1st	WNIT First Round
2014–15	DeUnna Hendrix	20–12	14–6	T-2nd	
2015–16	DeUnna Hendrix	12–19	10–10	6th	
2016–17	DeUnna Hendrix	15–15	13–5	3rd	
2017–18	DeUnna Hendrix	17–14	10–8	4th	
2018–19	DeUnna Hendrix	22–9	15–3	2nd	WNIT First Round
2019–20	Chelsea Banbury	16–13	14–6	3rd	
2020–21	Chelsea Banbury	22–7	17–3	1st	NCAA First Round
2021–22	Chelsea Banbury	17–14	13–5	T–4th	
2022–23	Chelsea Banbury	17–15	13–5	2nd	WNIT First Round
2023–24	Chelsea Banbury	20–12	14–2	1st	WBIT First Round
2024–25	Chelsea Banbury	21–12	13–3	1st	NCAA First Four
Total:		904–679 (.571)			
National champion Postseason invitational champion Conference regular season champion Conference regular season and conference tournament champion Division regular season champion Division regular season and conference tournament champion Conference tournament champion

== Postseason Results ==
=== NCAA Division I ===
High Point have appeared in the NCAA Division I women's basketball tournament three times. They have a combined record of 0–3.

Year	Seed	Round	Opponent	Result
2021	#16	First Round	#1 UConn	L 59–102
2025	#16	First Four	#16 William & Mary	L 63–69
2026	#15	First Round	#2 Vanderbilt	L 61–102

=== WNIT ===
High Point have appeared in the Women's National Invitation Tournament four times. They have a combined record of 0–4.

Year	Round	Opponent	Result
2007	First Round	Charlotte	L 72–45
2012	First Round	NC State	L 88–78
2014	First Round	Bowling Green	L 72–62
2019	First Round	Ohio	L 81–74

=== NCAA Division II ===
High Point appeared in the NCAA Division II women's basketball tournament one time. They had a record of 2–1.

Year	Round	Opponent	Result
1997	First Round; Regional Semifinal; Sweet Sixteen	Longwood; Shippensburg; Edinboro	W 80–64; W 71–53; L 70–68

=== AIAW ===
High Point made three appearances in the AIAW National Small College Basketball Championship. They had a record of 6–3. They were champions in 1978.

Year	Round	Opponent	Result
1977	First Round; Quarterfinal	Salisbury; SE Louisiana	W 114–50; L 112–85
1978	First Round; Quarterfinal; Semifinal; Final	Eastern New Mexico; William Penn; Berry; South Carolina St.	W 104–65; W 66–65; W 105–77; W 92–88
1979	First Round; Quarterfinal	North Dakota State; Dayton	W 93–40; L 75–65

=== NAIA ===
High Point made one appearance in the NAIA Women's Basketball Championships. They had a combined record of 0–1.

Year	Round	Opponent	Result
1995	First Round	Arkansas Tech	L 82–57
