= Longwood Lancers women's basketball =

2025–26 Longwood Lancers women's basketball team
- University: Longwood University
- First season: 1976–77
- Head coach: Erika Lang-Montgomery (4th season)
- Location: Farmville, Virginia
- Arena: Joan Perry Brock Center (capacity: 3,000)
- Conference: Big South
- Nickname: Lancers
- Colors: Blue and white
- Student section: Lancer Lunatics

NCAA Division I tournament round of 32
- Division II: 1995, 2003

NCAA Division I tournament appearances
- Division II: 1995, 1996, 1997, 2003; Division I: 2022

Conference tournament champions
- CVAC: 2003; Big South: 2022

Conference regular-season champions
- CVAC: 1996, 1997; Big South: 2022

Uniforms
Home	Away	Alternate

The Longwood Lancers women's basketball team is the Division I basketball team that represents Longwood University in Farmville, Virginia. The school's team currently competes in the Big South Conference of the National Collegiate Athletic Association.

== History ==
Longwood began play in 1920, with official NCAA status beginning in 1976. They were in Division II from 1980 to 2004 (playing in the Carolinas-Virginia Athletic Conference (CVAC) from 1995 to 2003), before transitioning to Division I from 2004 to 2007. They made the Division II Tournament in 1995, 1996, 1997, and 2003.

In March 2022, the Lancers won the Big South tournament championship and earned the school’s first-ever bid to the NCAA Division I Tournament. The team also tied for first place and won the regular-season Big South divisional title.

=== Conference affiliations ===
- 1972–73 to 1981–82: Association for Intercollegiate Athletics for Women
- 1982–83: NCAA Division II Independent
- 1983–84 to 1987–88: Mason–Dixon Conference
- 1988–89 to 1994–95: NCAA Division II Independent
- 1995–96 to 2002–03: Carolinas–Virginia Athletic Conference
- 2003–04: NCAA Division II Independent
- 2004–05 to 2011–12: NCAA Division I Independent
- 2012–13 to present: Big South Conference

== Postseason ==
=== NCAA Division I tournament results ===
The Lancers have appeared in one NCAA tournament. Their combined record is 1–1.

Year	Seed	Round	Opponent	Result
2022	#16	First Four; First round	#16 Mount St. Mary's #1 NC State	W, 74-70; L, 68–96

=== NCAA Division II tournament results ===
The Lancers made four appearances in the NCAA Division II women's basketball tournament. They had a combined record of 2–4.

Year	Round	Opponent	Result
1995	First round Regional semifinals	Presbyterian; USC Spartanburg	W, 78–72; L, 53–73
1996	First round	Salem-Teikyo	L, 55–86
1997	First round	High Point	L, 64–80
2003	First round Regional semifinals	West Liberty; Glenville State	W, 77–63; L, 51–63
