= Campbell Fighting Camels women's basketball =

2026–27 Campbell Fighting Camels women's basketball team
- University: Campbell University
- Head coach: Ali Jaques (1st season)
- Location: Buies Creek, North Carolina
- Arena: John W. Pope Jr. Convocation Center (capacity: 3,095)
- Conference: Coastal Athletic Association
- Nickname: Fighting Camels
- Colors: Black and orange

NCAA Division I tournament appearances
- 2000

Conference tournament champions
- Big South: 1989; TAAC: 2000

Conference regular-season champions
- Big South: 1989, 1991, 2020, 2022; TAAC: 2001

Uniforms
Home	Away

The Campbell Fighting Camels women's basketball team is the women's basketball team that represent the Campbell University in Buies Creek, North Carolina. The school's team currently competes in the Coastal Athletic Association (CAA), having moved from the Big South Conference in 2023.

== History ==
Campbell began varsity play in 1972. They played in the NAIA from 1972 to 1986 before joining Division I in 1986. In their time in NAIA, they made the NCAIAW Division II Tournament once (1982 and the NAIA District 26 Playoffs/Tournament (1983–1986, with a losses in the District 26 title game in 1985 to Pembroke State and 1986 to Wingate). They have joined the Big South Conference in 2011, after playing in the Trans American Athletic Conference (now known as the Atlantic Sun Conference) from 1994 to 2011. In their time in the TAAC/A-Sun, they won a tournament title in 2000 and a regular season title in 2001. In their time in the Big South, they have won the regular season title in 1989, 1991 along with a tournament title in 1989. They have finished as Tournament Runner-up in 1986, 1987, 1990, 1991, and 1992. As of the end of the 2015–16 season, the Camels have a combined overall record of 642–507, with a 187–122 NAIA record and a 465–396 NCAA record.

== NCAA tournament results ==
Year	Seed	Round	Opponent	Result
2000	#15	First Round	#2 Duke	L 42–71
