= Gardner–Webb Runnin' Bulldogs women's basketball =

2025–26 Gardner–Webb Runnin' Bulldogs women's basketball team
- University: Gardner–Webb University
- Head coach: Terri Williams (1st season)
- Location: Boiling Springs, North Carolina
- Arena: Paul Porter Arena (capacity: 5,000)
- Conference: Big South
- Nickname: Runnin' Bulldogs
- Colors: Red and black

NCAA Division I tournament appearances
- 2011, 2023

Conference tournament champions
- 2011, 2023

Conference regular-season champions
- 2010, 2023

The Gardner–Webb Runnin' Bulldogs women's basketball team is the women's basketball team that represents Gardner–Webb University in Boiling Springs, North Carolina, United States. The school's team currently competes in the Big South Conference.

== Postseason ==
=== NCAA Division I tournament results ===
The Runnin' Bulldogs have appeared in two NCAA tournaments. Their record is 0–2.

Year	Seed	Round	Opponent	Result
2011	#14	First Round	#3 Miami	L 62−80
2023	#15	First Round	#2 Utah	L 77-103

=== WNIT results ===
The Bulldogs have appeared in the Women's National Invitation Tournament (WNIT) once. Their combined record is 0–1.

Year	Round	Opponent	Result
2010	First Round	Charlotte	L 60−74

=== NCAA Division II tournament results ===
The Bulldogs made one appearance in the NCAA Division II women's basketball tournament. They had a combined record of 0–1.

Year	Round	Opponent	Result
1996	First Round	Wingate	L, 78–84
