= 1995 in basketball =

The following are the basketball events of the year 1995 throughout the world.

== National team tournaments ==
=== FIBA World Under-19 Championship ===
- (gold) Greece
- (silver) Australia
- (bronze) Spain

=== Summer Universade ===
==== Men ====
- (gold) United States
- (silver) Japan
- (bronze) Canada

==== Women ====
- (gold) Italy
- (silver) United States
- (bronze) Russia

=== Eurobasket ===
==== Men ====
- EuroBasket 1995 in Greece:
  (gold) Yugoslavia
  (silver) Lithuania
  (bronze) Croatia

==== Women ====
- EuroBasket Women 1995 in the Czech Republic:
  (gold) Ukraine
  (silver) Italy
  (bronze) Russia

=== European Youth Summer Olympic Days ===
- 1995 European Youth Summer Olympic Days in the United Kingdom:
  (gold) Greece
  (silver) Spain
  (bronze) Croatia

== Professional club seasons ==
- Men
  - 1995 NBA Finals: Houston Rockets over the Orlando Magic 4-0. MVP: Hakeem Olajuwon
    - 1995 NBA Playoffs
    - 1994–95 NBA season
    - 1995 NBA draft
    - 1995 NBA All-Star Game

=== College ===
- Men
  - NCAA
    - Division I: UCLA 89, Arkansas 79
    - NIT: Virginia Tech def. Marquette University
    - Division II: University of Southern Indiana 71, UC Riverside 63
    - Division III: Wis.-Platteville 69, Manchester 55
  - NAIA
    - Division I Birmingham-Southern College AL 92, Pfeiffer University NC 76
    - Division II Albertson (Idaho) 81, Whitworth (Wash.) 72 OT
  - NJCAA
    - Division I Sullivan College, Louisville, KY 103, Allegany CC, Cumberland, MD 98 O/T
    - Division II Penn Valley CC, Mo. 93, Kishwukee CC, Ill. 88
    - Division III Sullivan County CC 74, Gloucester County College 63
- Women
  - NCAA
    - Division I: University of Tennessee 83, University of Georgia 65
    - Division II: North Dakota State 104, Shippensburg 78
    - Division III: Wis.-Oshkosh 66 Mount Union 50
  - NAIA
    - Division I: Southern Nazarene (Okla.) 80, Southeastern Oklahoma State University 79
    - Division II Western Oregon 80, Huron (S.D.) 77
  - NJCAA
    - Division I Trinity Valley CC 69, Independence CC 55
    - Division II Lansing CC 74, Kankakee CC 68
    - Division III Central Lakes College-Brainerd 71, Monroe CC 57

== Awards and honors ==
=== Professional ===
- Men
  - NBA Most Valuable Player Award: David Robinson, San Antonio Spurs
  - NBA Rookie of the Year Award: Grant Hill, Detroit Pistons; Jason Kidd, Dallas Mavericks (tie)
  - NBA Defensive Player of the Year Award: Dikembe Mutombo, Denver Nuggets
  - NBA Coach of the Year Award: Del Harris, Los Angeles Lakers

=== Collegiate ===
- Men
  - John R. Wooden Award: Ed O'Bannon, UCLA
  - Naismith College Coach of the Year: Jim Harrick, UCLA
  - Frances Pomeroy Naismith Award: Tyus Edney, UCLA
  - Associated Press College Basketball Player of the Year: Joe Smith, Maryland
  - NCAA basketball tournament Most Outstanding Player: Tony Delk, Kentucky
  - Associated Press College Basketball Coach of the Year: Kelvin Sampson, Oklahoma
  - Naismith Outstanding Contribution to Basketball: Victor Bubas
- Women
  - Naismith College Player of the Year: Rebecca Lobo, Connecticut
  - Naismith College Coach of the Year: Geno Auriemma, Connecticut
  - Wade Trophy: Rebecca Lobo, Connecticut
  - Frances Pomeroy Naismith Award: Amy Dodrill, Johns Hopkins
  - Associated Press Women's College Basketball Player of the Year: Rebecca Lobo, Connecticut
  - NCAA basketball tournament Most Outstanding Player: Rebecca Lobo, UConn
  - Basketball Academic All-America Team: Rebecca Lobo, UConn
  - Carol Eckman Award: Ceal Barry, Colorado
  - Associated Press College Basketball Coach of the Year: Geno Auriemma, Connecticut

=== Naismith Memorial Basketball Hall of Fame ===
- Class of 1995:
  - Kareem Abdul-Jabbar
  - Anne Donovan
  - John Kundla
  - Vern Mikkelsen
  - Cheryl Miller
  - George Yardley

== Movies ==
- The Basketball Diaries
- Slam Dunk Ernest

== Births ==
- February 25 — Mario Hezonja, Croatian professional basketball player for Orlando Magic

== Deaths ==
- January 7 — Art Stoefen, American NBL player (born 1914)
- January 18 — Cliff Fagan, former president of the Basketball Hall of Fame (born 1911)
- February 12 — Nat Holman, Hall of Fame player for the Original Celtics and coach of the 1950 NCAA and NIT champion CCNY Beavers (born 1896)
- February 20 — Margaret Wade, women's player and coach at Delta State University (born 1912)
- March 16 — Art Mollner, member of 1936 US Olympic championship team (born 1912)
- April 4 — Joe Richey, All-American at BYU (born 1931)
- April 13 — Mal McMullen, American NBA player (Indianapolis Olympians) (born 1927)
- April 17 — Jay McCreary, American college coach (LSU) (born 1918)
- April 28 — Walter Devlin, American NBA player (Fort Wayne Pistons, Minneapolis Lakers) (born 1931)
- May 25 — Krešimir Ćosić, Hall of Fame Croatian player. First foreign player to earn collegiate All-American status while at Brigham Young University (born 1911)
- June 12 — Pierre Russell, American ABA player (Kentucky Colonels) (born 1949)
- July 21 — Tarzan Woltzen, American NBL player (born 1905)
- July 23 — Chuck Hanger, America AAU player (born 1924)
- August 21 — Hal Cihlar, American NBL player (born 1914)
- August 25 — John Mills, American BAA player (Pittsburgh Ironmen) (born 1919)
- November 3 — Cookie Cunningham, American college coach (Washington and Lee, North Dakota) (born 1905)
- December 12 — Jack Friel, American college coach (Washington State) (born 1898)
