= 1995 National Invitation Tournament =

Annual NCAA basketball competition

- Season: 1994–95
- Teams: 32
- Finals site: Madison Square Garden, New York City
- Champions: Virginia Tech Hokies (2nd title)
- Runner-up: Marquette Golden Eagles (3rd title game)
- Semifinalists: Penn State Nittany Lions (2nd semifinal); Canisius Golden Griffins (2nd semifinal)
- Winning coach: Bill Foster (1st title)
- MVP: Shawn Smith (Virginia Tech)

The 1995 National Invitation Tournament was the 1995 edition of the annual NCAA college basketball competition. The 1995 tournament was notable for the roster size of eventual champion Virginia Tech - injuries prior to and during the tournament meant the Hokies won some games with as few as six active players.

== Selected teams ==
Below is a list of the 32 teams selected for the tournament.

- Auburn
- Bradley
- Canisius
- Clemson
- College of Charleston
- Colorado
- Coppin State
- DePaul
- Eastern Michigan
- George Washington
- Georgia
- Illinois State
- Iowa
- Marquette
- Miami (FL)
- Montana
- Nebraska
- New Mexico State
- Ohio
- Penn State
- Providence
- St. Bonaventure
- St. John's
- Saint Joseph's
- Seton Hall
- South Florida
- Southern Miss
- Texas Tech
- Utah State
- UTEP
- Virginia Tech
- Washington State

== Bracket ==
Below are the four first round brackets, along with the four-team championship bracket.

First Round
Providence	72
College of Charleston	67
Virginia Tech	62
Clemson	54
UTEP	90
Montana	60
New Mexico State	97
Colorado	83

Second Round
Providence	78
Virginia Tech	91
UTEP	89
New Mexico State	92

Quarterfinals
Virginia Tech	64
New Mexico State	61

First Round
Bradley	86
Eastern Michigan	85
Canisius	83
Seton Hall	71
Washington State	94
Texas Tech	82
Illinois State	93
Utah State	87

Second Round
Bradley	53
Canisius	55
Washington State	83
Illinois State	80

Quarterfinals
Canisius	89
Washington State	80

First Round
South Florida	74
St. John's	68
Coppin State	75
Saint Joseph's	68
Marquette	68
Auburn	61
St. Bonaventure	75
Southern Miss	70

Second Round
South Florida	75
Coppin State	59
Marquette	70
St. Bonaventure	61

Quarterfinals
South Florida	60
Marquette	67

First Round
Iowa	96
DePaul	87
Ohio	83
George Washington	71
Nebraska	69
Georgia	61
Penn State	62
Miami (FL)	56

Second Round
Iowa	66
Ohio	62
Nebraska	59
Penn State	65

Quarterfinals
Iowa	64
Penn State	67

=== Semifinals & finals ===
Semifinals
Virginia Tech	71
Canisius	59
Marquette	87
Penn State	79

Finals
Virginia Tech	65
Marquette	64

Third place game
Canisius	62
Penn State	66

== See also ==
- 1995 NCAA Division I men's basketball tournament
- 1995 NCAA Division II men's basketball tournament
- 1995 NCAA Division III men's basketball tournament
- 1995 NCAA Division I women's basketball tournament
- 1995 NAIA Division I men's basketball tournament
- 1995 NAIA Division II men's basketball tournament
