= 1995 NCAA Division I women's basketball championship game =

Women's basketball championship game

NCAA Division I women's basketball championship game
National championship game
Tennessee Lady Volunteers	Connecticut Huskies
(34–2)	(34–0)
64	70
Head coach: Pat Summitt	Head coach: Geno Auriemma
- AP: 3
- Coaches: 3
- AP: 1
- Coaches: 1
	1st half	2nd half	Total
Tennessee Lady Volunteers	38	26	64
Connecticut Huskies	32	38	70
- Date: April 2, 1995
- Venue: Target Center, Minneapolis, Minnesota
- MVP: Rebecca Lobo, Connecticut
- Referees: Larry Shepphard and Dee Kantner
- Attendance: 18,038

United States TV coverage
- Network: CBS
- Announcers: Sean McDonough (play-by-play) and Ann Meyers (analyst)

The 1995 NCAA Division I women's basketball championship game was the final game of the 1995 NCAA Division I women's basketball tournament. It determined the champion of the 1994–95 NCAA Division I women's basketball season and was contested by the Connecticut Huskies and the Tennessee Lady Volunteers. The game was played on April 2, 1995, at Target Center in Minneapolis, Minnesota. After trailing 38–32 at halftime, No. 1 UConn defeated No. 3 Tennessee 70–64 to capture the NCAA national championship, and complete the second unbeaten season in women's NCAA history (Texas, 1986). Connecticut's Rebecca Lobo was named the tournament's Most Outstanding Player.

== Participants ==
=== Tennessee Lady Volunteers ===
The Lady Vols, representing the University of Tennessee in Knoxville, Tennessee, were led by head coach Pat Summitt in her 21st season at the school. Tennessee began the season ranked No. 1 in the AP Poll. The team's first loss of the season was at No. 2 UConn on January 16. The team swept through the SEC regular season before losing to Vanderbilt in the SEC tournament championship game. The Lady Vols finished No. 3 in the final AP poll, behind No. 1 UConn and No. 2 Colorado.

Entering the NCAA tournament at 29–2, Tennessee held the No. 1 seed and hosted their games in the Mideast region. They defeated No. 16 seed Florida A&M, No. 9 seed FIU, No. 4 seed Western Kentucky, and No. 2 seed Texas Tech to reach the Final Four for the first time since the championship after the 1991 season. In the National semifinals, the Lady Volunteers easily defeated the No. 3 seed from the Midwest region and fellow SEC rival, Georgia, 73–51.

=== Connecticut Huskies ===
The Huskies, who represented the University of Connecticut in Storrs, Connecticut, were led by head coach Geno Auriemma, in his 10th season at the school. UConn opened the season ranked No. 4 in the AP poll, and worked their way to the No. 2 ranking ahead of a showdown with No. 1 Tennessee on January 16 in Storrs. UConn knocked off the Lady Vols to wrestle away the top spot in the rankings – a place they remained for the rest of the season. Connecticut closed out a perfect regular season, including an 18–0 record in the Big East, before winning the Big East tournament to improve to 29–0 overall.

In the NCAA tournament, the No.1 seeded Huskies defeated No. 16 seed Maine, No. 8 seed Virginia Tech, No. 4 seed Alabama, and No. 3 seed Virginia to reach the second NCAA Final Four in program history. They won 87–60 over the West region's No. 2 seed Stanford in the national semifinal to reach the national championship game with a 34–0 record.

== Starting lineups ==
Tennessee	Position	Connecticut
Latina Davis	G	Jennifer Rizzotti
Michelle Marciniak	G	Pam Webber
Pashen Thompson	C	Kara Wolters
Dana Johnson	F	Rebecca Lobo
Nikki McCray	F	Jamelle Elliott

== Game summary ==
CBS

April 2, 1995

No. 3 Tennessee Volunteers 64, No. 1 UConn Huskies 70
Scoring by half: 38–32, 26–38
Pts: Davis 11; Rebs: Asts:	Pts: Lobo 17; Rebs: Asts:

Target Center – Minneapolis, Minnesota
Attendance: 18,038
Referees: Larry Shepphard and Dee Kantner

== Media coverage ==
The game was broadcast on CBS with Sean McDonough on play-by-play duties and Ann Meyers as the color analyst.

== Aftermath ==
The Connecticut Huskies cemented their place as a program that could compete at the highest level of NCAA women's basketball. The Huskies joined the 1985–86 Texas Longhorns as the only two teams to complete a season an unbeaten National champions. UConn would return to the Final Four in 1996, but watched as Tennessee not only won the title in 1996, but went on to three-peat by winning in 1997 and 1998. In addition to those three titles to close out the 1990s, under legendary head coach Pat Summitt, the Lady Volunteers would also win National championships in 2007 and 2008. The Huskies then took over women's basketball in the 2000s and 2010s. Head coach Geno Auriemma would lead the program to National titles in 2000, 2002, 2003, 2004, 2009, 2010, 2013, 2014, 2015, and 2016. With a combined 19 championships and 41 Final Fours, these two programs have set the standard for excellence in women's college basketball and showcased a fierce rivalry that spanned multiple decades.
