= 1994–95 Georgia Lady Bulldogs basketball team =

Intercollegiate basketball season

1994–95 Georgia Lady Bulldogs basketball

NCAA tournament, Final Four
- Conference: Southeastern Conference

Ranking
- Coaches: No. 4
- AP: No. 12
- Record: 28–5 (8–3 SEC)
- Head coach: Andy Landers (16th season)
- Home arena: Stegeman Coliseum

1994–95 SEC women's basketball standings
	Conf.				Overall
Team	W		L	PCT	W		L	PCT
No. 3 Tennessee	11	–	0	1.000	34	–	3	.919
No. 12 Georgia	8	–	3	.727	28	–	5	.848
No. 6 Vanderbilt ^{†}	8	–	3	.727	28	–	7	.800
No. 15 Arkansas	7	–	4	.636	23	–	7	.767
No. 17 Florida	7	–	4	.636	24	–	9	.727
No. 13 Alabama	7	–	4	.636	22	–	9	.710
No. 19 Ole Miss	6	–	5	.545	21	–	8	.724
Auburn	5	–	6	.455	17	–	10	.630
Kentucky	4	–	7	.364	14	–	14	.500
South Carolina	1	–	10	.091	12	–	15	.444
Mississippi State	1	–	10	.091	9	–	18	.333
LSU	1	–	10	.091	7	–	20	.259
† 1995 SEC tournament winner Rankings from AP poll

The 1994–95 Georgia Lady Bulldogs women's basketball team represented University of Georgia in the 1994–95 college basketball season. The Lady Bulldogs, led by 16th-year head coach Andy Landers, played their home games at Stegeman Coliseum and were members of the Southeastern Conference. They finished the season 28–5, 8–3 in SEC play to finish as Eastern division champions. Georgia was the No. 3 seed in the Midwest region of the NCAA tournament. They defeated Indiana, Louisville, NC State, and Colorado to reach their first NCAA Final Four in ten seasons. In the National semifinal game, Georgia was defeated by old foe Tennessee.

== Roster ==
1994–95 Georgia Bulldogs women's basketball team
Players
Coaches

Pos.	#	Name	Height	Year	Previous school	Hometown
F	00	La'Keshia Frett	6 ft 3 in (1.91 m)	So		Hampton, Virginia
G	10	Saudia Roundtree	5 ft 8 in (1.73 m)	Jr		Anderson, South Carolina
G	25	Kedra Holland-Corn	5 ft 8 in (1.73 m)	So
C	33	Tracy Henderson	6 ft 3 in (1.91 m)	So

Head coach

Andy Landers

Assistant coach(es)

Legend

- (C) Team captain
- (S) Suspended
- (I) Ineligible
- (W) Walk-on
- Injured
- Current redshirt

== Schedule ==
Date time, TV	Rank^{#}	Opponent^{#}	Result	Record	Site (attendance) city, state
Regular season
Nov 25, 1994*	No. 18	Ohio State	W 79–70	1–0	Stegeman Coliseum; Athens, GA
Nov 27, 1994*	No. 18	at Middle Tennessee State	W 95–71	2–0	Murphy Center; Murfreesboro, TN
Dec 7, 1994*	No. 186	Rutgers	W 105–70	3–0	Stegeman Coliseum; Athens, GA
Jan 15, 1995	No. 8	No. 10 Vanderbilt	L 52–65	12–1 (1–1)	Stegeman Coliseum; Athens, GA
Jan 18, 1995	No. 11	No. 14 Alabama	W 91–67	13–1 (2–1)	Stegeman Coliseum; Athens, GA
Feb 4, 1995	No. 11	at Mississippi State	W 69–66	18–1 (5–1)	Starkville, MS
Feb 8, 1995	No. 10	No. 18 Florida	L 46–59	18–2 (5–2)	Stegeman Coliseum; Athens, GA
Feb 10, 1995	No. 10	No. 14 Florida	W 80–77	19–2 (6–2)	Stegeman Coliseum; Athens, GA
Feb 13, 1995*	No. 10	at Texas	W 80–75	20–2	Frank Erwin Center; Austin, TX
Feb 15, 1995*	No. 12	New Mexico State	W 80–53	21–2	Stegeman Coliseum; Athens, GA
Feb 19, 1995	No. 12	Auburn	W 78–56	22–2 (8–2)	Stegeman Coliseum; Athens, GA
Feb 21, 1995*	No. 9	Charleston Southern	W 91–33	23–2	Stegeman Coliseum; Athens, GA
Feb 25, 1995	No. 9	at No. 2 Tennessee	L 61–83	23–3 (8–3)	Thompson–Boling Arena; Knoxville, TN
SEC tournament
Mar 4, 1995*	(3) No. 11	vs. (6) No. 15 Florida; Quarterfinals	W 88–71	24–3	McKenzie Arena; Chattanooga, TN
Mar 5, 1995*	(3) No. 11	vs. (2) No. 9 Vanderbilt; Semifinals	L 56–82	24–4	McKenzie Arena; Chattanooga, TN
NCAA tournament
Mar 17, 1995*	(3 MW) No. 12	(14 MW) Indiana; First round	W 81–64	25–4	Stegeman Coliseum; Athens, GA
Mar 19, 1995*	(3 MW) No. 12	(11 MW) Louisville; Second round	W 81–68	26–4	Stegeman Coliseum; Athens, GA
Mar 23, 1995*	(3 MW) No. 12	vs. (7 MW) No. 24 NC State; Regional Semifinal – Sweet Sixteen	W 98–79	27–4	Knapp Center; Des Moines, IA
Mar 25, 1995*	(3 MW) No. 12	vs. (1 MW) No. 2 Colorado; Regional Final – Elite Eight	W 82–79	28–4	Knapp Center; Des Moines, IA
Mar 31, 1995*	(3 MW) No. 12	vs. (1 ME) No. 3 Tennessee; National Semifinal – Final Four	L 51–73	28–5	Target Center; Minneapolis, MN
*Non-conference game. ^{#}Rankings from AP Poll. (#) Tournament seedings in parentheses. All times are in Eastern Time.

== Rankings ==
Ranking movements Legend: ██ Increase in ranking ██ Decrease in ranking т = Tied with team above or below
	Week																		
Poll	Pre	1	2	3	4	5	6	7	8	9	10	11	12	13	14	15	16	17	Final
AP	19	18	17	16	14	13	12	11т	8	11	11	11	10	12	9	11	12	12	Not released
Coaches	21	21	17	16	14	13	13	11	9	10	10	10	10	11	9	10	12	12	4

^Coaches did not release a Week 2 poll.
