= 1994–95 Tennessee Lady Volunteers basketball team =

Intercollegiate basketball season

1994–95 Tennessee Lady Volunteers basketball

SEC regular season champions

NCAA tournament, Runner-up
- Conference: Southeastern Conference

Ranking
- Coaches: No. 2
- AP: No. 3
- Record: 34–3 (11–0 SEC)
- Head coach: Pat Summitt (21st season)
- Assistant coaches: Mickie DeMoss; Holly Warlick
- Home arena: Thompson-Boling Arena

1994–95 SEC women's basketball standings
	Conf.				Overall
Team	W		L	PCT	W		L	PCT
No. 3 Tennessee	11	–	0	1.000	34	–	3	.919
No. 12 Georgia	8	–	3	.727	28	–	5	.848
No. 6 Vanderbilt ^{†}	8	–	3	.727	28	–	7	.800
No. 15 Arkansas	7	–	4	.636	23	–	7	.767
No. 17 Florida	7	–	4	.636	24	–	9	.727
No. 13 Alabama	7	–	4	.636	22	–	9	.710
No. 19 Ole Miss	6	–	5	.545	21	–	8	.724
Auburn	5	–	6	.455	17	–	10	.630
Kentucky	4	–	7	.364	14	–	14	.500
South Carolina	1	–	10	.091	12	–	15	.444
Mississippi State	1	–	10	.091	9	–	18	.333
LSU	1	–	10	.091	7	–	20	.259
† 1995 SEC tournament winner Rankings from AP poll

The 1994–95 Tennessee Lady Volunteers basketball team represented the University of Tennessee as a member of the Southeastern Conference during the 1994–95 women's college basketball season. Coached by Pat Summitt, the Lady Volunteers finished 34–3 (11–0 SEC). They finished runner-up to No. 1 and unbeaten UConn, losing by six points in the National Championship game. The loss would motivate the Lady Vols and they would follow this season with a run of three consecutive National championships.

== Roster ==
1994–95 Tennessee Lady Volunteers women's basketball team
Players
Coaches

Pos.	#	Name	Height	Year	Previous school	Hometown
G	3	Michelle Marciniak	5 ft 10 in (1.78 m)	Jr	Allentown Central Catholic	Allentown, Pennsylvania
C	4	Tiffani Johnson	6 ft 4 in (1.93 m)	So	Garinger	Charlotte, North Carolina

Head coach

- Pat Summitt

Assistant coach(es)

- Mickie DeMoss
- Holly Warlick

Legend

- (C) Team captain
- (S) Suspended
- (I) Ineligible
- (W) Walk-on
- Injured
- Current redshirt

Roster

== Schedule and results ==
Date time, TV	Rank^{#}	Opponent^{#}	Result	Record	Site city, state
Regular season
Nov 30, 1994*	No. 1	No. 2 Stanford	W 105–69	3–0	Thompson–Boling Arena; Knoxville, Tennessee
Jan 16, 1995*; ESPN	No. 1	at No. 2 Connecticut; Rivalry	L 66–77	16–1	Gampel Pavilion (8,241); Storrs, CT
Feb 25, 1995	No. 2	No. 9 Georgia	W 83–61	27–1 (11–0)	Thompson–Boling Arena; Knoxville, TN
SEC tournament
Mar 6, 1995*	(1) No. 2	vs. (2) No. 9 Vanderbilt; Championship game	L 61–67	29–2	McKenzie Arena; Chattanooga, TN
NCAA tournament
March 17, 1995*	(1 ME) No. 3	(16 ME) Florida A&M; First round	W 96–59	30–2	Thompson-Boling Arena; Knoxville, TN
March 19, 1995*	(1 ME) No. 3	(9 ME) Florida International; Second round	W 70–44	31–2	Thompson-Boling Arena; Knoxville, TN
March 22, 1995*	(1 ME) No. 3	(4 ME) No. 9 Western Kentucky; Regional Semifinal – Sweet Sixteen	W 87–65	32–2	Thompson-Boling Arena; Knoxville, TN
March 24, 1995*	(1 ME) No. 3	(2 ME) No. 5 Texas Tech; Regional Final – Elite Eight	W 80–59	33–2	Thompson-Boling Arena; Knoxville, TN
March 31, 1995*	(1 ME) No. 3	vs. (3 MW) No. 12 Georgia; National Semifinal – Final Four	W 73–51	34–2	Target Center; Minneapolis, MN
April 2, 1995*	(1 ME) No. 3	vs. (1 E) No. 1 Connecticut; Championship/Rivalry	L 64–70	34–3	Target Center (18,038); Minneapolis, MN
*Non-conference game. ^{#}Rankings from AP Poll. (#) Tournament seedings in parentheses. MW=Midwest.

== Rankings ==
Ranking movements Legend: ██ Increase in ranking ██ Decrease in ranking
	Week																		
Poll	Pre	1	2	3	4	5	6	7	8	9	10	11	12	13	14	15	16	17	Final
AP	1	1	1	1	1	1	1	1	1	2	2	2	2	2	2	2	2	3	Not released
Coaches	1	1	1	1	1	1	1	1	1	2	2	2	2	2	2	2	2	3	2

^Coaches did not release a Week 2 poll.
