= 1994–95 NCAA Division I women's basketball rankings =

- Season: 1994–95
- NCAA Tournament: 1995
- Preseason No. 1: Tennessee
- NCAA Tournament Champions: Connecticut
NCAA Division I women's basketball rankings


Two human polls comprise the 1994–95 NCAA Division I women's basketball rankings, the AP Poll and the Coaches Poll, in addition to various publications' preseason polls. The AP poll is currently a poll of sportswriters, while the USA Today Coaches' Poll is a poll of college coaches. The AP conducts polls weekly through the end of the regular season and conference play, while the Coaches poll conducts a final, post-NCAA tournament poll as well.

== Legend ==
–	No votes
(#)	Ranking

== AP Poll ==
Team	13-Nov	22-Nov	29-Nov	6-Dec	13-Dec	20-Dec	27-Dec	3-Jan	10-Jan	17-Jan	24-Jan	31-Jan	7-Feb	14-Feb	21-Feb	28-Feb	7-Mar	14-Mar
UConn	4	3	3	2	2	2	2	2	2	1	1	1	1	1	1	1	1	1
Colorado	11	11	10	10	8	9	9	7	6	6	5	4	3	3	3	3	3	2
Tennessee	1	1	1	1	1	1	1	1	1	2	2	2	2	2	2	2	2	3
Stanford	5	2	2	5	6	7	7	5	5	5	4	3	6	5	5	5	5	4
Texas Tech	9	6	11	11	11	11	10	9	7	7	7	6	4	7	7	7	6	5
Vanderbilt	12	12	9	9	9	8	8	6	10	8	9	8	7	8	10	9	8	6
Penn St.	10	10	7	7	7	6	5	8	12	10	10	10	13	11	8	8	7	7
Louisiana Tech	3	4	4	3	3	3	3	3	3	4	8	7	5	4	4	4	4	8
Western Ky.	21	21	19	17	16	15	15	13	13	9	6	9	9	13	11	10	11	9
Virginia	7	8	14	12	13	12	11	T11	9	12	12	12	8	6	6	6	9	10
North Carolina	6	7	5	4	4	4	4	4	4	3	3	5	11	9	12	12	10	11
Georgia	19	18	17	16	14	13	12	T11	8	11	11	11	10	12	9	11	12	12
Alabama	8	9	6	6	5	5	6	10	11	14	14	16	19	19	18	16	13	13
Washington	17	13	8	8	10	10	13	14	15	13	15	13	12	10	14	17	14	14
Arkansas	–	–	–	–	–	–	24	24	–	–	–	22	20	18	16	14	15	15
Purdue	2	5	13	15	15	14	14	19	22	19	22	21	17	15	13	13	16	16
Florida	14	15	15	13	T17	18	18	T16	18	17	13	T14	18	14	17	15	17	17
George Washington	18	17	18	18	T17	19	19	18	16	16	19	18	16	17	20	18	18	18
Ole Miss	24	22	20	T19	19	16	16	15	17	18	16	17	14	16	15	20	19	19
Duke	–	–	–	–	–	–	–	–	–	25	21	T14	21	22	19	22	21	20
Oregon St.	–	–	–	–	–	25	25	–	21	–	–	–	23	21	21	19	24	21
San Diego St.	–	–	–	–	–	–	–	–	–	–	–	–	–	25	22	21	20	22
Kansas	15	16	16	14	12	17	17	T16	14	15	17	19	15	20	24	23	22	23
North Carolina St.	–	–	–	–	–	–	–	–	–	–	–	–	–	–	–	–	25	24
Old Dominion	–	–	–	–	–	–	–	–	–	–	–	–	–	–	–	–	–	25
Auburn	–	–	25	23	25	–	–	–	–	–	–	–	–	–	–	–	–	–
DePaul	–	–	–	–	–	24	–	–	–	–	–	23	–	–	–	–	–	–
Drake	–	–	–	–	–	–	–	–	–	23	–	–	–	–	–	–	–	–
FIU	16	20	21	–	–	–	–	–	–	–	–	–	–	–	–	–	–	–
Iowa	13	14	12	T19	24	–	–	–	–	–	–	–	–	–	–	–	–	–
Missouri St.	–	–	–	25	–	–	–	–	–	–	–	–	–	–	–	–	–	–
Ohio St.	–	–	–	–	–	–	–	22	–	–	–	–	–	–	–	–	–	–
Oklahoma	–	–	–	–	–	–	–	–	–	–	–	T25	24	–	25	25	–	–
Oklahoma St.	–	–	–	–	–	–	–	–	–	–	23	–	–	–	–	–	–	–
Seton Hall	22	25	23	22	21	20	20	20	19	20	–	T25	–	–	–	–	–	–
Southern California	25	23	24	24	22	21	21	21	20	24	20	24	22	24	23	24	23	–
Southern Miss.	–	–	–	–	23	22	22	23	23	21	–	–	–	–	–	–	–	–
Texas	20	19	–	–	–	–	–	–	–	–	–	–	–	–	–	–	–	–
Texas A&M	23	24	22	21	20	23	23	25	25	22	18	20	–	23	–	–	–	–
Virginia Tech	–	–	–	–	–	–	–	–	–	–	25	–	–	–	–	–	–	–
Wisconsin	–	–	–	–	–	–	–	–	24	–	–	–	25	–	–	–	–	–

== USA Today Coaches poll ==
Team	PS	29-Nov	6-Dec	13-Dec	20-Dec	27-Dec	3-Jan	10-Jan	17-Jan	24-Jan	31-Jan	7-Feb	14-Feb	21-Feb	28-Feb	7-Mar	14-Mar	4-Apr
UConn	5	3	2	2	2	2	2	2	1	1	1	1	1	1	1	1	1	1
Tennessee	1	1	1	1	1	1	1	1	2	2	2	2	2	2	2	2	3	2
Stanford	3	2	5	6	6	6	5	5	5	4	3	4	4	4	4	4	4	3
Georgia	21	17	16	14	13	13	11	9	10	10	10	10	11	9	10	12	12	4
Colorado	10	8	8	8	9	8	6	6	6	5	4	3	3	3	3	3	2	5
Virginia	9	14	12	12	12	12	12	11	14	12	12	9	7	7	7	10	10	6
Texas Tech	11	13	11	11	11	10	10	7	7	7	6	5	6	6	6	6	6	7
Vanderbilt	13	12	10	10	10	9	8	10	8	9	T8	7	8	11	11	9	5	8
Purdue	4	11	13	15	15	16	19	21	19	19	19	17	16	15	13	14	15	9
Louisiana Tech	2	4	3	3	3	3	3	3	4	8	7	6	5	5	5	5	7	10
North Carolina	6	5	4	4	4	4	4	4	3	3	5	11	9	12	12	11	11	11
Western Ky.	23	19	18	16	14	14	14	13	9	6	T8	8	10	8	8	7	8	12
Washington	17	9	9	9	8	11	13	15	15	16	14	13	13	14	16	13	14	13
Alabama	7	7	7	7	7	7	9	8	11	13	13	18	18	17	15	15	13	14
George Washington	18	18	19	18	18	19	18	17	18	18	18	19	17	19	19	17	16	15
Penn St.	8	6	6	5	5	5	7	12	12	11	11	12	12	10	9	8	9	16
Duke	–	–	–	–	–	–	–	–	–	–	21	25	25	22	25	22	20	17
Florida	14	15	14	17	17	17	17	18	16	14	15	16	14	16	14	16	17	18
North Carolina St.	–	–	–	–	–	–	–	–	–	–	–	–	–	–	–	–	–	19
Arkansas	–	–	–	–	–	–	–	–	–	–	–	23	23	18	17	18	18	20
Oregon St.	–	–	–	–	–	–	–	–	–	–	–	22	20	21	20	24	22	21
Ole Miss	–	24	21	19	19	18	16	16	17	15	16	14	15	13	18	19	19	22
Kansas	15	16	15	13	16	15	15	14	13	17	17	15	19	23	22	20	21	23
Drake	–	–	–	–	–	–	–	–	–	–	–	–	–	–	–	–	–	24
Montana	–	–	–	–	–	–	–	–	–	–	–	–	–	–	–	–	–	25
DePaul	–	–	–	–	–	–	–	–	–	–	25	–	–	–	–	–	–	–
Florida Int’l	16	20	25	25	24	24	–	–	–	–	–	–	–	–	–	–	–	–
Iowa	12	10	17	24	–	–	–	–	–	–	–	–	–	–	–	–	–	–
Minnesota	–	–	–	–	–	–	–	24	–	–	–	–	–	–	–	–	–	–
Ohio St.	–	–	–	–	–	–	23	–	–	–	–	–	–	–	–	–	–	–
Oklahoma St.	24	25	24	–	–	25	25	–	–	–	–	–	–	–	–	–	–	–
Old Dominion	–	–	–	–	25	–	–	–	–	–	–	–	–	–	–	–	25	–
San Diego St.	–	–	–	–	–	–	–	–	–	–	–	–	–	–	T23	23	23	–
Seton Hall	22	22	23	21	21	22	21	20	20	24	24	–	–	–	–	–	–	–
Southern California	20	21	20	20	20	21	20	19	22	20	22	20	22	20	21	21	24	–
Southern Miss.	–	–	–	23	22	20	22	22	21	25	–	–	–	–	–	–	–	–
Texas	19	–	–	–	–	–	–	–	–	–	–	–	–	–	–	–	–	–
Texas A&M	25	23	22	22	23	23	24	25	23	21	20	24	21	25	T23	25	–	–
Virginia Tech	–	–	–	–	–	–	–	–	24	23	–	–	–	–	–	–	–	–
