= Saudia Roundtree =

American basketball player (born 1974)

Personal information
- Born: October 4, 1974 (age 52)
- Listed height: 5 ft 8 in (1.73 m)

Career information
- High school: Westside (Anderson, South Carolina)
- College: Kilgore (1992–1994); Georgia (1994–1996)
- Position: Guard
- Number: 3

Career highlights
- WBCA Player of the Year (1996); USBWA National Player of the Year (1996); Naismith College Player of the Year (1996); Kodak Coaches' All-American (1996); All-American – USBWA (1996); First-team All-American – AP (1996); SEC Female Athlete of the Year (1996); SEC Player of the Year (1996); First-team All-SEC (1996); South Carolina Miss Basketball (1992)
- Stats at Basketball Reference
Medals
Women's basketball
Representing the United States
Jones Cup
Bronze medal – third place	1995 Taipei	Team competition

Saudia Roundtree (born October 4, 1974) is an American women's basketball coach, and also a former star player.

== Career ==
Roundtree was born in Anderson, South Carolina, and attended Westside High School in Anderson, South Carolina, where she was named a High School All-American by the WBCA. She participated in the inaugural WBCA High School All-America Game in 1992, scoring ten points.

She began her collegiate career at Kilgore College, where she captured National Junior College Player of the Year honors in 1994. She was inducted into the Kilgore College Athletics Hall of Fame in 2002.

She later transferred to the University of Georgia, where she was named an All-American and the Naismith College Player of the Year, USBWA Women's National Player of the Year, and WBCA Player of the Year in 1996. In 1996, Roundtree was named to the Final Four All Tournament team. Roundtree also received the Espy Award in 1997 for the Best Female College Basketball Player. She obtained a degree in sociology from Georgia.

After leaving UGA, Roundtree played three seasons in the American Basketball League, two with the Atlanta Glory and one with the Nashville Noise, and was an ABL All-Star. She started her coaching career at Morris Brown College in 2001 and then was the head women's basketball coach North Carolina A&T University from 2002 to 2005. Roundtree spent 2005 on the coaching staff at the University of Alabama before becoming an assistant coach at University of Central Florida in 2006.

== Georgia statistics ==
Legend
GP	Games played	GS	Games started	MPG	Minutes per game
FG%	Field goal percentage	3P%	3-point field goal percentage	FT%	Free throw percentage
RPG	Rebounds per game	APG	Assists per game	SPG	Steals per game
BPG	Blocks per game	PPG	Points per game	**Bold**	Career high

Year	Team	GP	Points	FG%	FT%	RPG	APG	SPG	BPG	PPG
95	Georgia	**33**	487	**41.9%**	70.0%	4.7	**6.8**	1.9	**0.1**	14.8
96	Georgia	**33**	**551**	40.5%	**74.7%**	**5.6**	5.9	**2.3**	0.0	**16.7**
Career		66	1038	41.2%	72.5%	5.1	6.4	2.1	0.1	15.7

== USA Basketball ==
Roundtree competed with USA Basketball as a member of the 1995 Jones Cup Team that won the Bronze in Taipei. Roundtree averaged 3.0 points per game and had eleven assist, tied for second highest on the team.
