= Knicks–Nuggets brawl =

On-court altercation at a National Basketball Association game

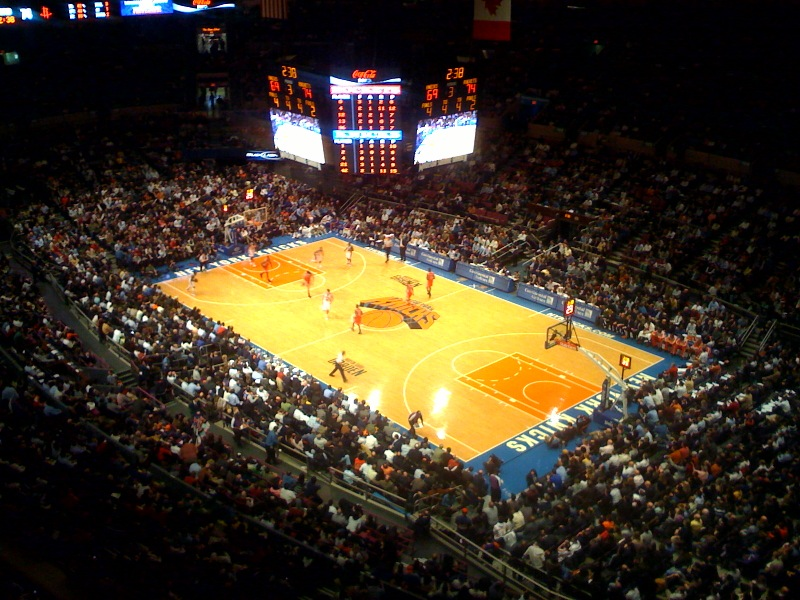
- Madison Square Garden, the site of the brawl
Denver Nuggets	New York Knicks
123	100
Head coach: George Karl	Head coach: Isiah Thomas
	1	2	3	4	Total
Denver Nuggets	29	38	27	29	123
New York Knicks	22	32	30	16	100
- Date: December 16, 2006
- Venue: Madison Square Garden, New York City, U.S.
- Referees: Dick Bavetta, Violet Palmer, Robbie Robinson
- Attendance: 19,763
- Network: MSG Network (Knicks); Altitude Sports and Entertainment (Nuggets)

The Knicks–Nuggets brawl was an on-court altercation at a National Basketball Association (NBA) game between the New York Knicks and Denver Nuggets at Madison Square Garden in New York City on December 16, 2006. This altercation became the most penalized on-court fight in the NBA since the Indiana Pacers–Detroit Pistons brawl, otherwise known as the Malice at the Palace, which occurred on November 19, 2004.

The fight began with a flagrant foul by Knicks guard Mardy Collins on Nuggets guard J. R. Smith in the closing seconds of the game. Several players joined in the confrontation and began to make physical contact. The fight briefly spilled into the stands, and also stretched to the other end of the court. All ten players on the floor at the time were ejected after the altercation was finished. When suspensions were announced, seven players were suspended without pay for a combined total of 47 games.

Although they were not penalized, Nuggets coach George Karl and Knicks coach Isiah Thomas were both scrutinized for their part in the brawl, while Nuggets forward Carmelo Anthony was criticized for harming his image as a star. Several writers said the NBA had penalized the players excessively because it wanted to keep its image free from violence.

== Game recap ==
Entering the game, the New York Knicks had a record of 9–17 while the Denver Nuggets sported a 13–9 record. Despite trailing the entire game, the Knicks came as close as two points in the first half, However, the Nuggets regrouped and closed the half with a 13-point advantage, and continued to lead in the second half by as much as 26 points in the third quarter. The Knicks briefly came within ten points with ten minutes left in the game, but the Nuggets went on a 12–2 run and were never threatened again. Forward Carmelo Anthony scored 34 points to lead the Nuggets, and center Marcus Camby added 24 points and 9 rebounds; Stephon Marbury scored a season-high 31 points for the Knicks.

=== Altercation ===
The incident occurred with 1:15 remaining in the Knicks' home game at Madison Square Garden, where the Nuggets were leading 119–100. The Knicks' Mardy Collins fouled the Nuggets' J. R. Smith on a fast break by slapping his arms around Smith's neck, knocking him to the floor; Collins was immediately whistled for a Flagrant 2 Foul by official Dick Bavetta, meaning Collins was to be immediately ejected. As Smith stood up to confront Collins, Nate Robinson pulled Smith away, and then began pushing and shouting at him. David Lee tried to hold Smith back, but Smith broke free and charged into Robinson, causing both players to fall into the photographers and front row courtside seats before they were quickly separated by teammates.

As the fighting was seemingly coming to an end, Anthony confronted Collins and punched him in the face, knocking him to the ground. Jared Jeffries immediately tried to attack Anthony but tripped over Camby before being restrained by coaches and teammates, while Anthony backed up towards the Nuggets' bench. Collins also ran down the court to get at Anthony but was blocked by Nenê and Smith. All ten players on the court at the time of the incident were ejected by the officiating crew that consisted of Bavetta, Violet Palmer, and Robbie Robinson. Linas Kleiza made one of two free throws off the initial flagrant foul by Collins, as Smith, who would have been the one to shoot the free throws after being the recipient of the foul, was among those ejected.

== Reactions ==
=== Suspensions ===
Player	Suspension by the NBA	Salary lost
Carmelo Anthony (DEN)	15 games	US$640,097
J.R. Smith (DEN)	10 games	US$126,142
Nate Robinson (NYK)	10 games	US$107,771
Mardy Collins (NYK)	6 games	US$49,084
Jared Jeffries (NYK)	4 games	US$189,636
Nenê (DEN)	1 game	US$72,727
Jerome James (NYK)	1 game	US$49,091

NBA Commissioner David Stern reacted with strict penalties for the players involved, stating, "It is our obligation to take the strongest possible steps to avoid such failures in the future". Seven players were suspended for a total of 47 games, and the players lost in excess of US$1.2 million in salary. Each team was also fined US$500,000. Because Anthony's suspension was longer than twelve games, he was eligible to appeal to an arbitrator; however, Anthony eventually announced he would not attempt one, saying he did not "want to be a further distraction".

=== Public reaction ===
Several sportswriters said the brawl was not as violent as the Pacers–Pistons brawl two years before, and 81% of respondents in a SportsNation poll said the biggest difference between the two brawls was that it "didn't involve players going into the stands and fighting fans". However, MSNBC's Michael Ventre said that the Knicks and Nuggets brawl was worse because "it was touched off by the actions of players, and it escalated because of them". Several writers said that the penalties were more severe because of the Pacers–Pistons brawl, because the NBA was on a "very serious image-cleanup campaign".

Steve Francis claimed that the media reaction to the fight and the suspensions itself were "racially motivated", arguing that Major League Baseball and the National Hockey League had "incidents that are way worse than basketball" but did not face the scrutiny that the NBA received "because there are more black players in the NBA". This was echoed by several writers, and sportswriter-television personality Michael Wilbon said that, "NBA players have endured more scrutiny, pertaining to image, than any other professional athletes in America". Martin Luther King III called for a meeting to end the violence in the NBA, stating, "Individuals who play a game should be able to conduct themselves appropriately". However, the NBA said through a spokesman that they "don't think that meeting is necessary".

=== Coaches' role in the brawl ===
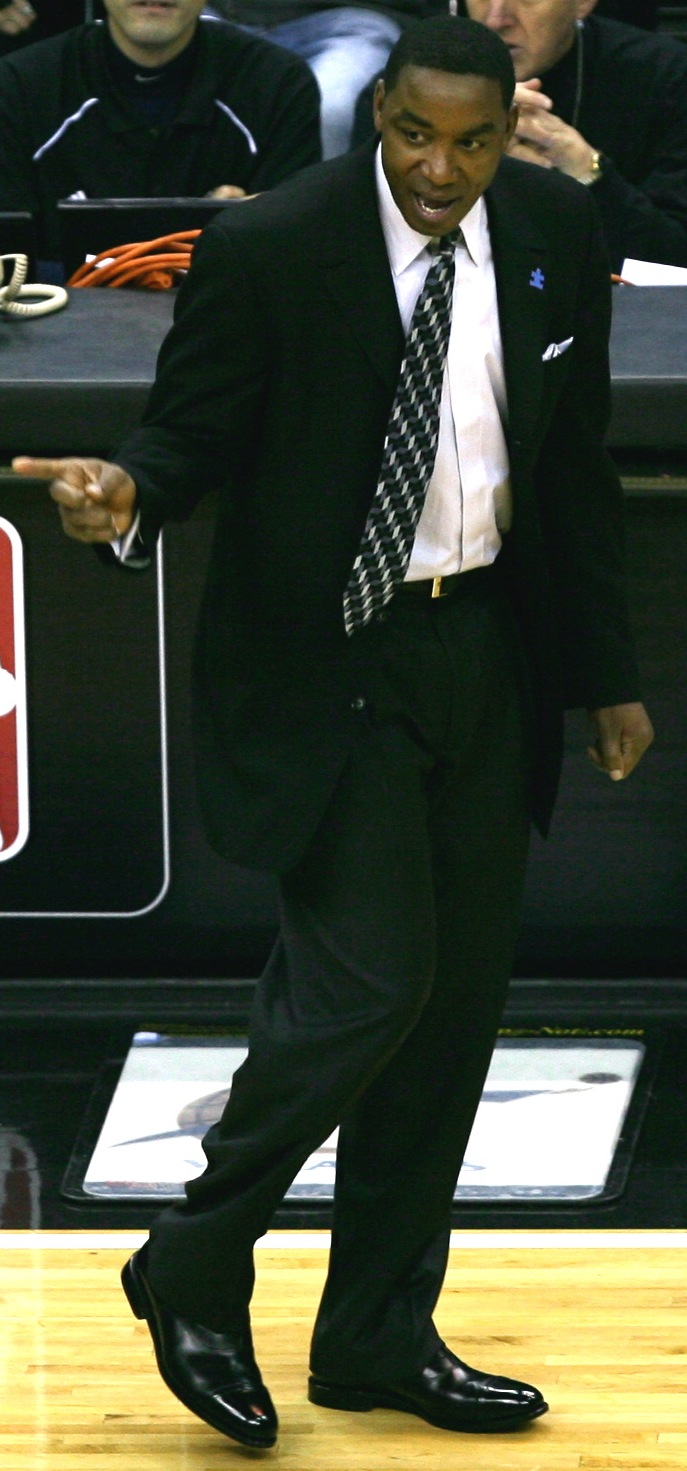
Thomas came under scrutiny for his actions before the brawl.

Minutes before the brawl started, Knicks coach Isiah Thomas asked Anthony not to go into the painted area around the basket, despite the fact that they were not members of the same team. Thomas later said that because Nuggets head coach George Karl kept his team's starting players on the court for the closing minutes of the game, which Thomas thought showed a lack of sportsmanship, his orders to Anthony were to "show some class". However, Karl responded by saying the brawl "was directed by Isiah".

Thomas was not penalized after the brawl, as an NBA investigation ruled that they did not have "adequate evidence upon which to make a determination", but several writers criticized the NBA for not including Thomas in the suspensions. ESPN analyst Marc Stein called Thomas' explanations of his comments "laughable", and commentator Greg Anthony, a former Knicks player, said he "never had a coach say that to an opponent". It was also suggested that Thomas was attempting to resurrect the physical tactics of his former team, the "Bad Boy" Detroit Pistons.

In response to Thomas saying that keeping the Nuggets starters on the floor in the final minutes of the game was unsportsmanlike, Karl said that he "never thought about running up the score", and only wanted to "get a big win on the road". However, several sportswriters criticized his decision, and some said that he should also have been penalized. It was also suggested that Karl was trying to humiliate Thomas due to the perception that Thomas had mistreated Larry Brown, a friend of Karl's. Karl was also blamed for putting his players in a position to start a fight.

=== Carmelo Anthony ===
The day following the brawl, Anthony issued a statement and apology to his family, to the NBA, and to fans. He also specifically apologized to Mardy Collins, whom he directly struck during the incident. At the time of the brawl, Anthony was the league's leading scorer; his suspension was also the longest of the players suspended, and the sixth-longest in NBA history. According to former NBA player Steve Kerr, Anthony had "tarnished" his image, and basketball analyst Ric Bucher said that Anthony had "torched his own career". Sports Illustrated writer Marty Burns said that Anthony faced becoming known by sports fans across America as the player who punched Collins in the face and then ran away. An example of the backlash was Northwest Airlines pulling Anthony from its in-flight magazine cover, as it said it did not want "to condone the behavior of Anthony". In 2019, Anthony said that the NBA was "making an example of [him] at that point in time" because of the fallout from the Pacers–Pistons brawl.

== Events after the brawl ==
A day after Anthony was suspended, Denver acquired Allen Iverson, who was then second in the NBA in scoring behind Anthony. After Anthony and Smith returned from their suspensions, the trio led the Nuggets to 45 wins and the sixth seed in the Western Conference for the 2007 playoffs. However, they were eliminated in the first round by the San Antonio Spurs. The Knicks finished 33–49, 12th in the Eastern Conference, and did not make the playoffs.

The two teams faced each other for the first time since the altercation on November 17, 2007, which the Nuggets won 115–83. Opposing players Renaldo Balkman and Linas Kleiza began arguing with each other after Balkman was called for a hard foul on Kleiza, but the incident was defused after Balkman was given a technical foul. Iverson, Anthony, and Camby were all removed early in the fourth quarter. Balkman and Kleiza later became teammates after Balkman was traded to the Nuggets in the 2008 off–season.

== Box score ==
December 16, 2006
7:30 p.m.

Box score

Denver Nuggets 123, New York Knicks 100
Scoring by quarter: 29–22, 38–32, 27–30, 29–16
Pts: Anthony 34; Rebs: Camby, Evans 9 each Asts: Miller 10	Pts: Marbury 31; Rebs: Lee 15; Asts: Marbury 8

Madison Square Garden, New York City
Attendance: 19,763
Referees: Dick Bavetta, Violet Palmer, Robbie Robinson

Denver Nuggets
Player	Pos	Min	FGM	FGA	FG%	3PM	3PA	3P%	FTM	FTA	FT%	OREB	DREB	REB	AST	STL	BLK	TO	PF	PTS	+/−
Carmelo Anthony	F	42:28	15	29	.517	0	1	.000	4	5	.800	3	4	7	4	0	0	0	3	34	19
J. R. Smith	G	35:25	4	7	.571	2	4	.500	3	4	.750	0	3	3	3	1	0	0	3	13	25
Andre Miller	G	34:24	5	9	.556	0	0		2	2	1.000	2	3	5	10	3	0	7	3	12	19
Marcus Camby	C	32:01	9	11	.818	0	0		6	6	1.000	1	8	9	3	1	7	0	1	24	16
Nenê	F	17:56	2	5	.400	0	0		2	2	1.000	0	4	4	3	1	2	2	4	6	16
Eduardo Nájera		23:17	0	2	.000	0	1	.000	4	4	1.000	0	0	0	1	0	0	1	3	4	1
Earl Boykins		21:27	4	9	.444	2	4	.500	2	2	1.000	0	0	0	2	0	0	0	2	12	−3
Reggie Evans		17:42	3	4	.750	0	0		2	2	1.000	2	7	9	0	0	0	3	3	8	9
Yakhouba Diawara		11:35	2	2	1.000	2	2	1.000	0	0		0	1	1	2	0	0	0	0	6	4
Linas Kleiza		1:15	1	1	1.000	1	1	1.000	1	2	.500	0	0	0	0	0	0	0	0	4	3
DerMarr Johnson		1:15	0	0		0	0		0	0		0	1	1	0	0	0	0	0	0	3
Joe Smith		1:15	0	0		0	0		0	0		0	0	0	0	0	0	0	0	0	3
Team totals		240	45	79	.570	7	13	.538	26	29	.897	8	31	39	28	6	9	13	22	123	

New York Knicks
Player	Pos	Min	FGM	FGA	FG%	3PM	3PA	3P%	FTM	FTA	FT%	OREB	DREB	REB	AST	STL	BLK	TO	PF	PTS	+/−
Stephon Marbury	G	41:29	13	24	.542	3	8	.375	2	4	.500	2	1	3	8	1	0	2	3	31	−18
Jared Jeffries	F	38:36	4	8	.500	1	2	.500	0	1	.000	5	1	6	2	3	2	3	4	9	−23
Jamal Crawford	G	28:32	1	9	.111	0	5	.000	0	0		0	2	2	7	1	0	2	0	2	−28
Eddy Curry	C	26:41	6	10	.600	0	0		7	11	.636	1	2	3	0	0	0	4	3	19	−23
Channing Frye	F	26:31	4	12	.333	0	1	.000	2	3	.667	2	3	5	0	1	4	1	4	10	−1
David Lee		39:28	6	10	.600	0	0		0	0		7	8	15	1	1	1	3	5	12	−8
Nate Robinson		29:14	7	20	.350	3	10	.300	0	0		1	2	3	3	0	0	0	2	17	4
Malik Rose		6:32	0	2	.000	0	0		0	0		2	2	4	0	0	0	1	0	0	−10
Renaldo Balkman		2:07	0	0		0	0		0	0		0	0	0	0	0	0	0	1	0	−5
Mardy Collins		0:49	0	0		0	0		0	0		0	0	0	0	0	0	0	1	0	−3
Jerome James		Did not play																			
Kelvin Cato		Did not play																			
Team totals		240	41	95	.432	7	26	.269	11	19	.579	20	21	41	21	7	7	16	23	100	

== See also ==
- Malice at the Palace
- National Basketball Association criticisms and controversies
- Violence in sports
- List of violent spectator incidents in sports
- Sparks–Shock brawl
- 2010 Acropolis Basketball Tournament brawl
- 2011 Crosstown Shootout brawl
- Philippines–Australia basketball brawl
