= USBWA Women's National Player of the Year =

USBWA Women's National Player of the Year Award
- Awarded for: Top player in NCAA Division I women's basketball
- Country: United States
- Presented by: United States Basketball Writers Association
- First award: 1988
- Currently held by: Sarah Strong, UConn
- Website: http://www.sportswriters.net

The United States Basketball Writers Association National Player of the Year Award is an award that has been presented by the United States Basketball Writers Association since the 1987–88 season to the top women's college basketball player in NCAA Division I.

Since 2012, the award has been named the Ann Meyers Drysdale Award in honor of the former UCLA four-time All-American player.

== Winners ==
| Year | Winner | School | Position | Class |
|---|---|---|---|---|
| 1988 | Sue Wicks | Rutgers | F | Senior |
| 1989 | Clarissa Davis | Texas | F | Senior |
| 1990 | Jennifer Azzi | Stanford | G | Senior |
| 1991 | Dawn Staley | Virginia | G | Junior |
| 1992 | Dawn Staley (2) | Virginia | G | Senior |
| 1993 | Sheryl Swoopes | Texas Tech | G/F | Senior |
| 1994 | Lisa Leslie | USC | C | Senior |
| 1995 | Rebecca Lobo | UConn (Note: The University of Connecticut used "Connecticut" as its primary athletic brand until changing it to "UConn" starting with the 2013–14 school year.) | C | Senior |
| 1996 | Saudia Roundtree | Georgia | G | Senior |
| 1997 | Kate Starbird | Stanford | G | Senior |
| 1998 | Chamique Holdsclaw | Tennessee | F | Junior |
| 1999 | Chamique Holdsclaw (2) | Tennessee | F | Senior |
| 2000 | Tamika Catchings | Tennessee | F | Junior |
| 2001 | Ruth Riley | Notre Dame | C | Senior |
| 2002 | Sue Bird | UConn | G | Senior |
| 2003 | Diana Taurasi | UConn | G | Junior |
| 2004 | Alana Beard | Duke | G | Senior |
| 2005 | Seimone Augustus | LSU | F | Junior |
| 2006 | Ivory Latta | North Carolina | G | Junior |
| 2007 | Candace Parker | Tennessee | C | Junior |
| 2008 | Candace Parker (2) | Tennessee | C | Senior |
| 2009 | Maya Moore | UConn | F | Sophomore |
| 2010 | Tina Charles | UConn | C | Senior |
| 2011 | Maya Moore (2) | UConn | F | Senior |
| 2012 | Brittney Griner | Baylor | C | Junior |
| 2013 | Brittney Griner (2) | Baylor | C | Senior |
| 2014 | Breanna Stewart | UConn | F | Sophomore |
| 2015 | Breanna Stewart (2) | UConn | F | Junior |
| 2016 | Breanna Stewart (3) | UConn | F | Senior |
| 2017 | Kelsey Plum | Washington | G | Senior |
| 2018 | A'ja Wilson | South Carolina | F | Senior |
| 2019 | Megan Gustafson | Iowa | PF/C | Senior |
| 2020 | Sabrina Ionescu | Oregon | PG | Senior |
| 2021 | Paige Bueckers | UConn | G | Freshman |
| 2022 | Aliyah Boston | South Carolina | F | Junior |
| 2023 | Caitlin Clark | Iowa | PG | Junior |
| 2024 | Caitlin Clark (2) | Iowa | PG | Senior |
| 2025 | JuJu Watkins | USC | SG | Sophomore |
| 2026 | Sarah Strong | UConn | F | Sophomore |

== See also ==
- Oscar Robertson Trophy – the USBWA's national men's college player of the year award
- USBWA Most Courageous Award – presented to figures associated with college basketball who have "demonstrated extraordinary courage reflecting honor on the sport of amateur basketball"
- USBWA National Freshman of the Year
