= Violet Palmer =

American basketball referee (born 1964)

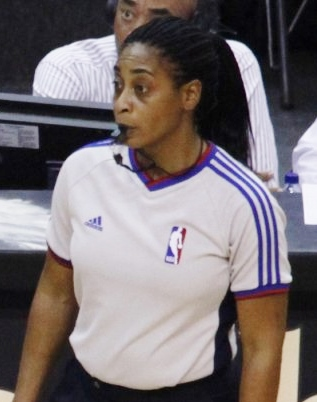
- Palmer in 2009
- Born: July 20, 1964 (age 62); Lynwood, California, US
- Education: Cal Poly Pomona
- Occupation: Basketball referee
- Years active: 1997–2016
- Employer: National Basketball Association

Violet Renice Palmer (born July 20, 1964) is an American retired basketball referee in the NBA and WNBA and the first female official to reach the highest competitive tier in any major U.S. professional sports league. She also earned recognition as a member of two NCAA Division II women's championship basketball teams. Palmer was the first woman to officiate an NBA playoff game when she did so in the April 25, 2006 match between the Indiana Pacers and New Jersey Nets. In the NBA, Palmer wore uniform number 12. She retired in 2016 and was inducted into the Women's Basketball Hall of Fame and the LGBTQ Sports Hall of Fame in 2025.

== Biography ==
Violet Palmer was born July 20, 1964 in Lynwood, California. She was raised in Compton, California, and grew up in the same neighborhood where Serena and Venus Williams lived as small children. She graduated from Compton High School, and attended college at Cal Poly Pomona. While at Cal Poly, she played point guard on the 1985 and 1986 NCAA Division II women's championship teams.

In 2001, Palmer established Violet Palmer's Official Camp to train youths in the art of officiating games. The camp runs annually from July 9 to July 11.

In 2010, Palmer was part of a family team on the game show Family Feud.

In 2022, Palmer received an honorary doctorate of science from her alma mater, Cal Poly Pomona.

== Officiating career ==
Palmer has officiated hundreds of NBA and WNBA games.

After years of refereeing at various levels, including NBA pre-season and exhibition games, Palmer was offered an opportunity to officiate the NCAA Division I men's tournament in 1996. She accepted, but the offer was later retracted when NCAA members balked at the idea of having a female referee male players.

In 1997, Palmer and Dee Kantner were signed by the NBA to together become the first top-level female officials in any major U.S. professional sport. On October 31, 1997, Palmer made history when she officiated the NBA season opener between the Vancouver Grizzlies and the Dallas Mavericks, in British Columbia, Canada.

As a woman, Palmer's achievement was received with mixed feelings. While magazines such as Ebony and Sports Illustrated generally celebrated her achievement, some NBA players were critical. Charles Barkley: "Violet, I was wrong about you. I apologize. You're all right with me." Former basketball player Dennis Scott, who played for the Phoenix Suns at the time, also expressed concern at having females referee male players. Scott, in particular, worried that female referees would feel verbally or physically abused. However, Palmer has been officiating without any major gender issues so far.

Palmer was one of three NBA referees who officiated the brawl-marred December 16, 2006, game between the Denver Nuggets and New York Knicks. The officiating crew, which also consisted of Dick Bavetta and Robbie Robinson, ejected all 10 players who were on the court when the brawl broke out.

On May 28, 2009, Palmer was hired as coordinator of women's basketball officials for the West Coast Conference.

On February 16, 2014, Palmer became the first female to officiate an All-Star Game in any of the four major United States sports.

On July 6, 2015, Palmer was named coordinator of women's basketball officials for the Western Athletic Conference.

On September 22, 2016, Palmer retired from on-court duties with the NBA due to knee issues. Afterward, she began work as a manager in the NBA's referee operations department. At the time of her retirement, she had refereed 919 NBA games.

On June 20, 2022, Palmer was hired as coordinator of women's basketball officials for the Big West Conference.

== Personal life ==
Palmer is an out lesbian. In July 2014, she announced plans to marry her girlfriend of 20 years, celebrity hair stylist Tanya Stine.
