= 1994–95 Stanford Cardinal women's basketball team =

Intercollegiate basketball season

1994–95 Stanford Cardinal women's basketball

Pac-10 champions

NCAA tournament, Final Four
- Conference: Pacific-10 Conference

Ranking
- Coaches: No. 3
- AP: No. 4
- Record: 30–3 (17–1 Pac-10)
- Head coach: Tara VanDerveer (10th season)
- Assistant coaches: Amy Tucker; Reneé Brown
- Home arena: Maples Pavilion

1994–95 Pacific-10 Conference women's basketball standings
	Conf.				Overall
Team	W		L	PCT	W		L	PCT
No. 4 Stanford	17	–	1	.944	30	–	3	.909
No. 14 Washington	13	–	5	.722	25	–	9	.735
No. 21 Oregon State	12	–	6	.667	21	–	8	.724
Oregon	11	–	7	.611	18	–	10	.643
USC	10	–	8	.556	18	–	10	.643
Washington State	9	–	9	.500	16	–	11	.593
Arizona	6	–	12	.333	20	–	10	.667
California	5	–	13	.278	10	–	17	.370
UCLA	5	–	13	.278	10	–	17	.370
Arizona State	2	–	16	.111	4	–	23	.148
Rankings from AP Poll

The 1994–95 Stanford Cardinal women's basketball team represented Stanford University in the 1994–95 NCAA Division I women's basketball season. The Cardinal were coached by Tara VanDerveer who was in her tenth year. The Cardinal were members of the Pacific-10 Conference. They won the Pac-10 Championship by four games and reached the Final Four for the fourth time in six seasons.

== Roster ==
1994–95 Stanford Cardinal women's basketball team
Players
Coaches

Pos.	#	Name	Height	Year	Hometown
F	0	Olympia Scott	6 ft 2 in (1.88 m)	Fr	Los Angeles, California
G	3	Kate Paye	5 ft 8 in (1.73 m)	Sr	Woodside, California
G	10	Jamila Wideman	5 ft 6 in (1.68 m)	So	Amherst, Massachusetts
F	13	Vanessa Nygaard	6 ft 0 in (1.83 m)	RS Fr	Carlsbad, California
G	15	Regan Freuen	6 ft 0 in (1.83 m)	Fr	Spokane, Washington
G	21	Charmin Smith	5 ft 10 in (1.78 m)	So	St. Louis, Missouri
G/F	23	Bobbie Kelsey	5 ft 11 in (1.8 m)	Jr	Decatur, Georgia
F	24	Kristin Folkl	6 ft 2 in (1.88 m)	Fr	St. Louis, Missouri
F	30	Kate Starbird	6 ft 2 in (1.88 m)	So	Tacoma, Washington
C	32	Chandra Benton	6 ft 7 in (2.01 m)	Fr	Lake Oswego, Oregon
F	33	Tara Harrington	6 ft 0 in (1.83 m)	So	Klamath Falls, Oregon
C	34	Naomi Mulitauaopele	6 ft 3 in (1.91 m)	Fr	Seattle, Washington
F/C	44	Heather Owen	6 ft 2 in (1.88 m)	Fr	Moscow, Idaho
F	50	Rachel Hemmer	6 ft 3 in (1.91 m)	Sr	Austin, Texas
C	55	Anita Kaplan	6 ft 5 in (1.96 m)	Sr	Delmar, New York

Head coach

- Tara VanDerveer

Assistant coach(es)

Legend

- (C) Team captain
- (S) Suspended
- (I) Ineligible
- (W) Walk-on
- Injured
- Current redshirt

Roster

== Schedule ==
Date time, TV	Rank^{#}	Opponent^{#}	Result	Record	Site (attendance) city, state
Regular season
Nov 18, 1994*	No. 5	vs. No. 2 Purdue; Hall of Fame Tip-Off	W 62–52	1–0	Jackson, TN
Nov 24, 1994*	No. 2	No. 6 Texas Tech	W 79–60	2–0	Maples Pavilion; Palo Alto, CA
Nov 30, 1994*	No. 2	at No. 1 Tennessee	L 69–105	2–1	Thompson–Boling Arena; Knoxville, TN
Dec 2, 1994*	No. 2	at NC State	W 78–63	3–1	Reynolds Coliseum; Raleigh, NC
Dec 9, 1994*	No. 5	Cal State Fullerton	W 122–80	4–1	Maples Pavilion; Palo Alto, CA
Jan 4, 1995	No. 5	No. 14 Washington	W 68–54	10–1 (1–0)	Maples Pavilion; Palo Alto, CA
Jan 6, 1995	No. 5	Washington State	W 94–59	11–1 (2–0)	Maples Pavilion; Palo Alto, CA
Jan 11, 1995	No. 5	at Arizona State	W 83–59	12–1 (3–0)	ASU Activity Center; Tempe, AZ
Jan 13, 1995	No. 5	at Arizona	W 86–51	13–1 (4–0)	McKale Center; Tucson, AZ
Jan 19, 1995	No. 5	California	W 99–65	14–1 (5–0)	Maples Pavilion; Palo Alto, CA
Jan 25, 1995	No. 4	UCLA	W 88–49	15–1 (6–0)	Maples Pavilion; Palo Alto, CA
Jan 27, 1995	No. 4	No. 20 USC	W 109–53	16–1 (7–0)	Maples Pavilion; Palo Alto, CA
Feb 1, 1995	No. 3	at Oregon	W 86–51	17–1 (8–0)	Eugene, OR
Feb 3, 1995	No. 3	at Oregon State	L 73–78	17–2 (8–1)	Corvallis, OR
Mar 1, 1995	No. 5	Oregon State	W 76–66	23–2 (14–1)	Maples Pavilion; Palo Alto, CA
Mar 3, 1995	No. 5	Oregon	W 97–55	24–2 (15–1)	Maples Pavilion; Palo Alto, CA
Mar 8, 1995	No. 5	at Washington State	W 81–47	25–2 (16–1)	Beasley Coliseum; Pullman, WA
Mar 10, 1995	No. 5	at No. 14 Washington	W 55–50	26–2 (17–1)	Hec Edmundson Pavilion; Seattle, WA
NCAA women's tournament
Mar 16, 1995*	(2 W) No. 4	(15 W) UC Irvine; First round	W 88–55	27–2	Maples Pavilion; Palo Alto, CA
Mar 18, 1995*	(2 W) No. 4	(10 W) SMU; Second round	W 95–73	28–2	Maples Pavilion; Palo Alto, CA
Mar 23, 1995*	(2 W) No. 4	vs. (3 W) No. 11 North Carolina; Regional Semifinal – Sweet Sixteen	W 81–71	29–2	Pauley Pavilion; Los Angeles, CA
Mar 25, 1995*	(2 W) No. 4	vs. (4 W) No. 16 Purdue; Regional Final – Elite Eight	W 69–58	30–2	Pauley Pavilion; Los Angeles, CA
Apr 1, 1995*	(2 W) No. 4	vs. (1 E) No. 1 UConn; National Semifinal – Final Four	L 60–87	30–3	Target Center (18,038); Minneapolis, MN
*Non-conference game. ^{#}Rankings from AP Poll. (#) Tournament seedings in parentheses. W=Stanford, CA regional. All times are in Pacific Time.

== Rankings ==
Ranking movements Legend: ██ Increase in ranking ██ Decrease in ranking
	Week																		
Poll	Pre	1	2	3	4	5	6	7	8	9	10	11	12	13	14	15	16	17	Final
AP	5	2	2	5	6	7	7	5	5	5	4	3	6	5	5	5	5	4	Not released
Coaches	3	3	2	5	6	6	6	5	5	5	4	3	4	4	4	4	4	4	3

^Coaches did not release a Week 2 poll.
