= South Carolina Miss Basketball =

The South Carolina Miss Basketball honor recognized the top girls’ high school senior basketball player in the state of South Carolina. The award was presented annually by the Charlotte Observer.

== Award winners ==
Year	Player	High School	College	NBA/ABA draft
1990	Tammy Gibson	Hartsville		
1991	Libby Corry	Blacksburg		
1992	Saudia Roundtree	Westside	Georgia	
1993	Saudia Calloway	Orangeburg-Wilkinson		
1994	Allison Feaster	Chester	Harvard	1998 WNBA draft: 1st Rnd, 5th overall by the Los Angeles Sparks
1995	Nikki Blassingame	Seneca		
1996	Cion Washington	Irmo		
1997	Teresa Geter	Columbia		
1998	Shaunzinski Gortman	Keenan		
1999	Chrissy Floyd	Laurens		
2000	Nikki Jett	Columbia		
2001	LaQuita Neely	Laurens		
2002	LaTangela Atkinson	Bishopville Lee Central		
2003	Ivory Latta	York	North Carolina	
2004	D'Lesha Lloyd	Lower Richland		
2005	Kalana Greene	Timberland	Connecticut	
2006	Wilesia Hardy	Spartanburg		
2007	Bailey Dewart	Dorman		
2008	Schwanna Dunmore	C.E. Murray		
2009	Morgan Stroman	Lower Richland	Miami	
2010	Kayla Jenerette	Travelers Rest		
2011	Aleighsa Welch	Goose Creek	South Carolina	
2012	Xylina McDaniel	Spring Valley	North Carolina	
2013	Alaina Coates	Dutch Fork	South Carolina	
2014	A'ja Wilson	Heathwood	South Carolina	
2015	Dejoria Howard	Orangeburg-Wilkinson	Georgia Tech	
2016	Jhileiya Dunlap	Dreher	North Carolina	
2017	Jaelynn Murray	Dreher	North Carolina	
2018	Amari Young	North Augusta	Old Dominion	
2019	Danae McNeal	Swansea	Clemson	

=== Schools with multiple winners ===
School	Number of Awards	Years
Dreher	2	2016, 2017
Columbia	2	1997, 2000
Laurens	2	1999, 2001
Lower Richland	2	2004, 2009
Orangeburg-Wilkinson	2	1993, 2015

== See also ==
- South Carolina Mr. Basketball
