= 1995 NAIA Division II women's basketball tournament =

- Teams: 32
- Finals site: Physical Education Building, (Oregon)
- Champions: Western Oregon Wolves (1st title, 2nd title game, 3rd Fab Four)
- Runner-up: Northwest Nazarene Crusaders (1st title game, 1st Fab Four)
- Semifinalists: Mount Mercy Mustangs (2nd Fab Four); Shawnee State Bears (1st Fab Four)
- Coach of the year: Rusty Rogers (Western Oregon)
- Charles Stevenson Hustle Award: Kari Smith (Northwest Nazarene)
- Chuck Taylor MVP: Sandie Graves (Western Oregon)
- Top scorer: Sandie Graves (Western Oregon) (97 points)

The 1995 NAIA Division I women's basketball tournament was the tournament held by the NAIA to determine the national champion of women's college basketball among its Division II members in the United States and Canada for the 1994–95 basketball season.

This was the fourth NAIA women's tournament held exclusively for Division II teams.

Western Oregon defeated Northwest Nazarene in the championship game, 75–67, to claim the Wolves' first NAIA national title.

The tournament was played at the Physical Education Building at Western Oregon State College in Monmouth, Oregon.

== Qualification ==
The tournament field expanded for the second and final time, increasing from 24 to 32 teams. The top sixteen teams received seeds, and no teams received byes to the second round.

The tournament utilized a single-elimination format.

== Bracket ==
First round
1	Northern State (SD)	85
College of the Ozarks	57
Sterling (KS)	92
16	Tusculum	83
9	Missouri Valley	76
Brescia	81
Trinity International	62
8	Western Oregon	92
5	Shawnee State	84
Houghton	67
St. Thomas Aquinas	43
12	Tri-State	58
13	Mary (ND)	66
Bethany (KS)	70
Saint Francis (IN)	90
4	Doane	100
3	Mount Mercy	94
Westbrook	48
Whitworth	67
14	Culver–Stockton	60
11	Midland Lutheran	76*
Tennessee Wesleyan	61
Bloomfield	46
6	Concordia (WI)	60
7	Huron (SD)	99
Husson	62
Hardin-Simmons	64
10	Northwest Nazarene	84
15	Indiana Tech	63
Friends (KS)	50
Webber	48
2	Findlay	87

Second round
1	Northern State	93
Sterling	69
Brescia	65
8	Western Oregon	94
5	Shawnee State	67
12	Tri-State	56
Bethany (KS)	77
4	Doane	74
3	Mount Mercy	63*
Whitworth	60
11	Midland Lutheran	82
6	Concordia (WI)	90
7	Huron (SD)	89
10	Northwest Nazarene	91**
15	Indiana Tech	58
2	Findlay	83

Quarterfinals
1	Northern State	62
8	Western Oregon	66
5	Shawnee State	81
Bethany (KS)	66
3	Mount Mercy	70*
6	Concordia (WI)	69
10	Northwest Nazarene	73
2	Findlay	60

Semifinals
8	Western Oregon	77
5	Shawnee State	73
3	Mount Mercy	74
10	Northwest Nazarene	78

National championship
8	Western Oregon	75
10	Northwest Nazarene	67

== See also ==
- 1995 NAIA Division II men's basketball tournament
- 1995 NCAA Division I women's basketball tournament
- 1995 NCAA Division II women's basketball tournament
- 1995 NCAA Division III women's basketball tournament
- 1995 NAIA Division I women's basketball tournament
