= 1994–95 Connecticut Huskies women's basketball team =

Intercollegiate basketball season

1994–95 Connecticut Huskies women's basketball

NCAA tournament National Champions Big East tournament champions Big East regular season champions
- Conference: Big East Conference

Ranking
- Coaches: No. 1
- AP: No. 1
- Record: 35–0 (18–0 Big East)
- Head coach: Geno Auriemma (10th season)
- Associate head coach: Chris Dailey
- Assistant coaches: Tonya Cardoza; Charlene Curtis
- Home arena: Harry A. Gampel Pavilion

1994–95 Big East Conference women's basketball standings
	Conf.				Overall
Team	W		L	PCT	W		L	PCT
No. 1 Connecticut †	18	–	0	1.000	35	–	0	1.000
Villanova	13	–	5	.722	19	–	9	.679
Seton Hall	12	–	6	.667	24	–	9	.727
Pittsburgh	10	–	8	.556	17	–	11	.607
St. John's	10	–	8	.556	15	–	12	.556
Miami (FL)	8	–	10	.444	11	–	16	.407
Georgetown	6	–	12	.333	11	–	17	.393
Providence	5	–	13	.278	10	–	21	.323
Syracuse	5	–	13	.278	7	–	20	.259
Boston College	3	–	15	.167	13	–	14	.481
† 1995 Big East Tournament winner As of April 1, 1995; Rankings from AP poll

The 1994–95 Connecticut Huskies women's basketball team represented the University of Connecticut (UConn) during the 1994–95 NCAA Division I women's basketball season. The Huskies, led by Hall of Fame head coach Geno Auriemma in his 10th season at UConn, played their home games at Harry A. Gampel Pavilion and were members of the Big East Conference.

UConn finished their regular season with a record of 26–0, including 18–0 in the Big East to win the conference regular season championship. They also won the Big East tournament. Then, they won the NCAA Tournament, defeating Tennessee in the final to win their first national championship and complete their first undefeated season with a 35–0 record. UConn won all their games by double digits except for two in the NCAA Tournament.

== Roster ==
1994–95 UConn Huskies women's basketball team
Players
Coaches

Pos.	#	Name	Height	Year	Hometown
G	5	Kim Better	5 ft 7 in (1.7 m)	Jr	Suitland, Maryland
G	10	Missy Rose	5 ft 10 in (1.78 m)	So	Scranton, Pennsylvania
G	21	Jennifer Rizzotti	5 ft 5 in (1.65 m)	Jr	New Fairfield, Connecticut
F	25	Brenda Marquis	6 ft 3 in (1.91 m)	Fr	Moosup, Connecticut
F	31	Carla Berube	6 ft 0 in (1.83 m)	So	Oxford, Massachusetts
G	32	Pam Webber	5 ft 6 in (1.68 m)	Sr	Holidaysburg Pennsylvania
F	33	Jamelle Elliott	6 ft 0 in (1.83 m)	Jr	Washington, D.C.
F	34	Kelley Hunt	6 ft 2 in (1.88 m)	Fr	Londonderry, New Hampshire
F	40	Jill Gelfenbien	5 ft 11 in (1.8 m)	Sr	Wethersfield, Connecticut
F	42	Nykesha Sales	6 ft 0 in (1.83 m)	Fr	Bloomfield, Connecticut
F	44	Sarah Northway (redshirt)	6 ft 1 in (1.85 m)	Jr	Brainerd, Minnesota
C	50	Rebecca Lobo	6 ft 4 in (1.93 m)	Sr	Southwick, Massachusetts
C	52	Kara Wolters	6 ft 7 in (2.01 m)	So	Holliston, Massachusetts

Head coach

- Geno Auriemma

Assistant coach(es)

Legend

- (C) Team captain
- (S) Suspended
- (I) Ineligible
- (W) Walk-on
- Injured
- Current redshirt

== Schedule ==
Date time, TV	Rank^{#}	Opponent^{#}	Result	Record	Site city, state
Regular season
11/26/1994*	No. 3	Morgan State; Connecticut Classic	W 107–27	1–0	Harry A. Gampel Pavilion (7,265); Storrs, CT
11/27/1994*	No. 3	Rhode Island; Connecticut Classic	W 92–59	2–0	Harry A. Gampel Pavilion (7,029); Storrs, CT
12/4/1994	No. 3	Villanova	W 80–42	3–0 (1–0)	Harry A. Gampel Pavilion (7,388); Storrs, CT
12/7/1994*	No. 2	at Holy Cross	W 77–52	4–0	Hart Center (2,583); Worcester, MA
12/10/1994*	No. 2	at NC State	W 98–75	5–0	Reynolds Coliseum (1,066); Raleigh, NC
12/23/1994*	No. 2	Iona	W 101–42	6–0	Harry A. Gampel Pavilion (7,192); Storrs, CT
12/28/1994*	No. 2	California	W 99–52	7–0	Harry A. Gampel Pavilion (8,241); Storrs, CT
1/2/1995	No. 2	Pittsburgh	W 100–67	8–0 (2–0)	Harry A. Gampel Pavilion (7,859); Storrs, CT
1/5/1995	No. 2	at Georgetown	W 103–64	9–0 (3–0)	McDonough Gymnasium (1,005); Washington, D.C.
1/7/1995	No. 2	at St. John's	W 95–64	10–0 (4–0)	Carnesecca Arena (872); Queens, NY
1/11/1995	No. 2	Providence	W 104–50	11–0 (5–0)	Harry A. Gampel Pavilion (7,586); Storrs, CT
1/13/1995	No. 2	Seton Hall	W 80–36	12–0 (6–0)	Harry A. Gampel Pavilion (8,241); Storrs, CT
1/16/1995*; ESPN	No. 2	1 Tennessee; Rivalry	W 77–66	13–0	Harry A. Gampel Pavilion (8,241); Storrs, CT
1/18/1995	No. 1	at Boston College	W 79–54	14–0 (7–0)	Conte Forum (2,415); Chestnut Hill, MA
1/22/1995	No. 1	Syracuse	W 89–58	15–0 (8–0)	Harry A. Gampel Pavilion (8,241); Storrs, CT
1/24/1995	No. 1	at Miami (FL)	W 92–51	16–0 (9–0)	Miami Arena (921); Miami, FL
1/28/1995*	No. 1	at No. 17 Kansas; PowerBar Shootout	W 97–87	17–0	Kemper Arena (16,981); Kansas City, MO
1/31/1995	No. 1	at Providence	W 89–56	18–0 (10–0)	Alumni Hall (2,013); Providence, RI
2/5/1995	No. 1	Georgetown	W 94–72	19–0 (11–0)	Harry A. Gampel Pavilion (8,241); Storrs, CT
2/9/1995	No. 1	Miami (FL)	W 85–48	20–0 (12–0)	Harry A. Gampel Pavilion (8,241); Storrs, CT
2/12/1995	No. 1	at Seton Hall	W 84–62	21–0 (13–0)	Walsh Gymnasium (3,200); South Orange, NJ
2/16/1995	No. 1	at Pittsburgh	W 71–43	22–0 (14–0)	Fitzgerald Field House (1,896); Pittsburgh, PA
2/19/1995	No. 1	Boston College	W 86–34	23–0 (15–0)	Harry A. Gampel Pavilion (8,241); Storrs, CT
2/22/1995	No. 1	St. John's	W 103–56	24–0 (16–0)	Harry A. Gampel Pavilion (8,241); Storrs, CT
2/25/1995	No. 1	at Syracuse	W 77–59	25–0 (17–0)	Manley Field House (3,517); Syracuse, NY
2/27/1995	No. 1	at Villanova	W 79–54	26–0 (18–0)	duPont Pavilion (3,622); Philadelphia, PA
Big East tournament
3/4/1995	No. 1	Providence; Quarterfinals	W 92–63	27–0	Walsh Gymnasium (1,950); South Orange, NJ
3/5/1995	No. 1	Pittsburgh; Semifinals	W 95–63	28–0	Walsh Gymnasium (3,200); South Orange, NJ
03/06/1995	No. 1	Seton Hall; Championship	W 85–49	29–0	Walsh Gymnasium (3,200); South Orange, NJ
NCAA tournament
3/16/1995*	(1) No. 1	(16) Maine; First Round	W 105–75	30–0	Harry A. Gampel Pavilion (8,241); Storrs, CT
3/20/1995*	(1) No. 1	(8) Virginia Tech; Second Round	W 91–45	31–0	Harry A. Gampel Pavilion (8,241); Storrs, CT
3/24/1995*	(1) No. 1	(4) No. 13 Alabama; Sweet Sixteen	W 87–56	32–0	Harry A. Gampel Pavilion (8,241); Storrs, CT
3/26/1995*	(1) No. 1	(3) No. 10 Virginia; Elite Eight	W 67–63	33–0	Harry A. Gampel Pavilion (8,241); Storrs, CT
4/1/1995*	(1 E) No. 1	vs. (2 W) No. 4 Stanford; Final Four	W 87–60	34–0	Target Center (18,038); Minneapolis, MN
4/2/1995*	(1 E) No. 1	vs. (1 ME) No. 2 Tennessee; Championship/Rivalry	W 70–64	35–0	Target Center (18,038); Minneapolis, MN
*Non-conference game. ^{#}Rankings from AP Poll. (#) Tournament seedings in parentheses. All times are in EST.

== Rankings ==
Ranking movements Legend: ██ Increase in ranking ██ Decrease in ranking
	Week																		
Poll	Pre	1	2	3	4	5	6	7	8	9	10	11	12	13	14	15	16	17	Final
AP	4	3	3	2	2	2	2	2	2	1	1	1	1	1	1	1	1	1	Not released
Coaches	5	5	3	2	2	2	2	2	2	1	1	1	1	1	1	1	1	1	1

^Coaches did not release a Week 2 poll.

== Awards ==
- Rebecca Lobo
  - Associated Press Athlete of the Year
  - Wade Trophy
  - Naismith College Player of the Year
  - USBWA Women's National Player of the Year
  - Associated Press Women's College Basketball Player of the Year
  - NCAA basketball tournament Most Outstanding Player
  - Big East Conference Women's Basketball Player of the Year
- Geno Auriemma
  - Naismith College Coach of the Year
  - USBWA Women's National Coach of the Year
  - Associated Press College Basketball Coach of the Year
  - Big East Conference Coach of the Year
