= 1995 SEC women's basketball tournament =

American college basketball postseason tournament

- Classification: Division I
- Teams: 12
- Site: McKenzie Arena; Chattanooga, TN
- Champions: Vanderbilt (2nd title)
- Winning coach: Jim Foster (2nd title)
- MVP: Sheri Sam (Vanderbilt)
- Attendance: 29,540

The 1995 Southeastern Conference women's basketball tournament was the postseason women's basketball tournament for the Southeastern Conference (SEC) held at the McKenzie Arena in Chattanooga, Tennessee, from March 3–6, 1995. The Vanderbilt Commodores won the tournament and earned an automatic bid to the 1995 NCAA Division I women's basketball tournament.

== Seeds ==
All teams in the conference participated in the tournament. Teams were seeded by their conference record.

Seed	School	Conference record	Overall record	Tiebreaker
1	Tennessee^{‡†}	11–0	34–3	
2	Vanderbilt^{†}	8–3	28–7	
3	Georgia^{†}	8–3	28–5	
4	Alabama^{†}	7–4	22–9	
5	Arkansas	7–4	23–7	
6	Florida	7–4	24–9	
7	Ole Miss	6–5	21–8	
8	Auburn	5–6	17–10	
9	Kentucky	4–7	14–14	
10	Mississippi State	1–10	9–18	
11	LSU	1–10	7–20	
12	South Carolina	1–10	12–15	
‡ – SEC regular season champions, and tournament No. 1 seed. † – Received a bye in the conference tournament. Overall records include all games played in the SEC Tournament.

== Schedule ==
Game	Matchup^{#}	Score
First Round – Fri, Feb 28
1	No. 8 Auburn vs. No. 9 Kentucky	51–75
2	No. 5 Arkansas vs. No. 12 South Carolina	80–70
3	No. 7 Ole Miss vs. No. 10 Mississippi State	78–69
4	No. 6 Florida vs. No. 11 LSU	88–80
Quarterfinal – Sat, Mar 1
5	No. 1 Tennessee vs. No. 9 Kentucky	74–62
6	No. 4 Alabama vs. No. 5 Arkansas	86–72
7	No. 2 Vanderbilt vs. No. 7 Ole Miss	64–57
8	No. 3 Georgia vs. No. 6 Florida	88–71
Semifinal – Sun, Mar 2
9	No. 1 Tennessee vs. No. 4 Alabama	84–70
10	No. 2 Vanderbilt vs. No. 3 Georgia	82–56
Championship – Mon, Mar 3
11	No. 1 Tennessee vs. No. 2 Vanderbilt	61–67
# – Rankings denote tournament seed

== Bracket ==
First round Fri, Feb 28
8	Auburn	51
9	Kentucky	75
5	Arkansas	80
12	South Carolina	70
7	Ole Miss	78
10	Mississippi State	69
6	Florida	88
11	LSU	80

Quarterfinals; Sat, Mar 1
1	Tennessee	74
9	Kentucky	62
4	Alabama	86
5	Arkansas	72
2	Vanderbilt	64
7	Ole Miss	57
3	Georgia	88
6	Florida	71

Semifinals; Sun, Mar 2
1	Tennessee	84
4	Alabama	70
2	Vanderbilt	82
3	Georgia	56

Championship; Mon, Mar 3
1	Tennessee	61
2	Vanderbilt	67
