= 1995 NAIA Division I women's basketball tournament =

- Teams: 32
- Finals site: Oman Arena, Jackson, Tennessee
- Champions: Southern Nazarene Redskins (3rd title, 3rd title game, 4th Fab Four)
- Runner-up: SE Oklahoma State Savages (1st title game, 1st Fab Four)
- Semifinalists: David Lipscomb Bisons (2nd Fab Four); SW Oklahoma State Bulldogs (9th Fab Four)
- Coach of the year: Jerry Finkbeiner (Southern Nazarene)
- Charles Stevenson Hustle Award: Cherilyn Morris (Southern Nazarene)
- Chuck Taylor MVP: Crystal Robinson (SE Oklahoma State)
- Top scorer: Crystal Robinson (SE Oklahoma State) (177 points)

The 1995 NAIA Division I women's basketball tournament was the tournament held by the NAIA to determine the national champion of women's college basketball among its Division I members in the United States and Canada for the 1994–95 basketball season.

Top-seeded defending champions Southern Nazarene defeated Southeastern Oklahoma State in the championship game, 78–77, to claim the Redskins' third NAIA national title. This would ultimately be the second of four consecutive championships for Southern Nazarene.

The tournament was played at the Oman Arena in Jackson, Tennessee.

== Qualification ==
The tournament field remained fixed at thirty-two teams, with the top sixteen teams receiving seeds.

The tournament continued to utilize a simple single-elimination format.

== Bracket ==
First round
1	Southern Nazarene	90
Rosary (IL)	53
St. Mary's (TX)	51
16	Montevallo	67*
9	Campbellsville	69
Rockhurst	54
High Point	57
8	Arkansas Tech	82
5	SW Oklahoma State	78
Saint Vincent	52
Salem-Teikyo	76
12	Xavier Louisiana	87
13	Simon Fraser	79
East Texas Baptist	57
Lindenwood	53
4	Union (TN)	79
3	David Lipscomb	94
Clayton State	52
Mary Hardin-Baylor	72
14	Oklahoma Christian	88
11	Montana State Northern	71
Midwestern State	81
Fresno Pacific	57
6	Arkansas–Monticello	62
7	SE Oklahoma State	74
Belmont Abbey	49
Central State (OH)	71
10	Wayland Baptist	76
15	Saint Martin's (WA)	70
Western New Mexico	59
Voorhees	50
2	Auburn Montgomery	103

Second round
1	Southern Nazarene	82
16	Montevallo	73
9	Campbellsville	60
8	Arkansas Tech	56
5	SW Oklahoma State	70
12	Xavier Louisiana	64
13	Simon Fraser	74
4	Union (TN)	71
3	David Lipscomb	80
14	Oklahoma Christian	67
Midwestern State	58
6	Arkansas–Monticello	79
7	SE Oklahoma State	82
10	Wayland Baptist	67
15	Saint Martin's	79
2	Auburn Montgomery	95

Elite Eight
1	Southern Nazarene	76
9	Campbellsville	48
5	SW Oklahoma State	67
13	Simon Fraser	61
3	David Lipscomb	91
6	Arkansas–Monticello	69
7	SE Oklahoma State	81
2	Auburn Montgomery	76

Final Four
1	Southern Nazarene	54
5	SW Oklahoma State	48
3	David Lipscomb	74
7	SE Oklahoma State	75

National championship
1	Southern Nazarene	78
7	SE Oklahoma State	77

== See also ==
- 1995 NAIA Division I men's basketball tournament
- 1995 NCAA Division I women's basketball tournament
- 1995 NCAA Division II women's basketball tournament
- 1995 NCAA Division III women's basketball tournament
- 1995 NAIA Division II women's basketball tournament
