= Robbie Robinson (basketball) =

American basketball referee

Robbie Robinson (born February 2, 1959, in New York City, New York) is a professional basketball referee who officiated in the National Basketball Association (NBA) for 3 seasons beginning in the 2004–05 NBA season. He wore jersey number 53.

He was a member of the officiating crew during the Knicks–Nuggets brawl on December 16, 2006.

Robinson was fired from the NBA after the 2006–07 season for poor performance following a three–year trial run.
