= 1995 NCAA Division II women's basketball tournament =

American collegiate basketball tournament

- Teams: 48
- Finals site: , Fargo, North Dakota
- Champions: North Dakota State Bison (4th title)
- Runner-up: Portland State Vikings (1st title game)
- Third place: Missouri Western State Griffons (1st Final Four)
- Fourth place: Stonehill Chieftains (1st Final Four)
- Winning coach: Amy Ruley (4th title)
- MOP: Kasey Morlock (North Dakota State)

The 1995 NCAA Division II women's basketball tournament was the 14th annual tournament hosted by the NCAA to determine the national champion of Division II women's collegiate basketball in the United States.

Two-time defending champions North Dakota State defeated Portland State in the championship game, 98–85, to claim the Bison's fourth NCAA Division II national title. This was North Dakota State's fourth title in five years and would go on to be the third of four consecutive titles for the Bison.

The championship rounds were contested in Fargo, North Dakota.

== Regionals ==
=== East - Erie, Pennsylvania ===
Location: Mercyhurst Athletic Center Host: Mercyhurst College

First round - at sites below Round of 48; March 7
Washington, DC
District of Columbia	81
Shippensburg	87*
Clarion	66
East Stroudsburg	80
East Stroudsburg, Pennsylvania

Regional semifinals Round of 32; March 10
Mercyhurst	73
Shippensburg	68
East Stroudsburg	75
Saint Rose	85

Regional finals Sweet 16; March 11
Mercyhurst	55
Saint Rose	53

=== Great Lakes - Houghton, Michigan ===
Location: Student Development Complex Gymnasium Host: Michigan Technological University

First round - at sites below Round of 48; March 7
Rensselaer, Indiana
Oakland	86
St. Joseph's (IN)	78
Indianapolis	71
Northern Michigan	91
Marquette, Michigan

Regional semifinals Round of 32; March 10
Southern Indiana	69
Oakland	88
Northern Michigan	55
Michigan Tech	68

Regional finals Sweet 16; March 11
Oakland	60
Michigan Tech	56

=== North Central - Fargo, North Dakota ===
Location: Bison Sports Arena Host: North Dakota State University

First round - at sites below Round of 48; March 7
Brookings, South Dakota
Denver	59
South Dakota State	95
Minnesota Duluth	77
Northern Colorado	72
Greeley, Colorado

Regional semifinals Round of 32; March 10
North Dakota	75
South Dakota State	78
Minnesota Duluth	61
North Dakota State	98

Regional finals Sweet 16; March 11
South Dakota State	68
North Dakota State	82

=== Northeast - North Easton, Massachusetts ===
Location: Merkert Gymnasium Host: Stonehill College

First round - at sites below Round of 48; March 7
Lowell, Massachusetts
American International	78
UMass Lowell	66
Bridgeport	62
Bentley	72
Waltham, Massachusetts

Regional semifinals Round of 32; March 10
Stonehill	80
American International	60
Bentley	74
Saint Anselm	79*

Regional finals Sweet 16; March 11
Stonehill	83
St. Anselm	69

=== South - Lakeland, Florida ===
Location: Jenkins Field House Host: Florida Southern College

First round - at sites below Round of 48; March 7
Cleveland, Mississippi
Delta State	89
Savannah State	67
Fort Valley State	75
Rollins	55
Winter Park, Florida

Regional semifinals Round of 32; March 10
Valdosta State	80
Delta State	75
Fort Valley State	75
Florida Southern	82*

Regional finals Sweet 16; March 11
Valdosta State	73
Florida Southern	77

=== South Atlantic - Norfolk, Virginia ===
Location: Joseph G. Echols Memorial Hall Host: Norfolk State University

First round - at sites below Round of 48; March 7
Wingate, North Carolina
Carson-Newman	64
Wingate	77
Longwood	78
Presbyterian	72
Farmville, Virginia

Regional semifinals Round of 32; March 10
Norfolk State	68
Wingate	70
Longwood	53
USC Spartanburg	73

Regional finals Sweet 16; March 11
Wingate	82
USC Spartanburg	63

=== South Central - St. Joseph, Missouri ===
Location: MWSC Fieldhouse Host: Missouri Western State College

First round - at sites below Round of 48; March 7
Canyon, Texas
Chadron State	75
West Texas A&M	86
Abilene Christian	99
Pittsburg State	93
Pittsburg, Kansas

Regional semifinals Round of 32; March 10
Washburn	69
West Texas A&M	60
Abilene Christian	71
Missouri Western State	79

Regional finals Sweet 16; March 11
Washburn	57
Missouri Western State	73

=== West - Portland, Oregon ===
Location: PSU Gym Host: Portland State University

First round - at sites below Round of 48; March 7
Carson, California
Cal State Dominguez Hills	57
UC Riverside	53
Humboldt State	88
Seattle Pacific	99
Seattle, Washington

Regional semifinals Round of 32; March 10
UC Davis	42
Cal State San Bernardino	52
Seattle Pacific	75
Portland State	86

Regional finals Sweet 16; March 11
UC Davis	71
Portland State	82

== Elite Eight - Fargo, North Dakota ==
Location: Bison Sports Arena Host: North Dakota State University

National Quarterfinals; Elite Eight; March 22
Portland State	82
Wingate	69
Stonehill	80
Mercyhurst	78
North Dakota State	87
Oakland	61
Missouri Western State	79
Florida Southern	77

National semifinals Final Four; March 23
Portland State	75
Stonehill	59
North Dakota State	74
Missouri Western State	67

National Championship; Third Place Game; March 24
Portland State	85
North Dakota State	98
Third Place Game
Stonehill	66
Missouri Western State	76

== All-tournament team ==
- Kasey Morlock, North Dakota State
- Amy Towne, Missouri Western State
- Michelle Doonan, Stonehill
- Kim Manifesto, Portland State
- Lori Roufs, North Dakota State
- Kristi Smith, Portland State

== See also ==
- 1995 NCAA Division II men's basketball tournament
- 1995 NCAA Division I women's basketball tournament
- 1995 NCAA Division III women's basketball tournament
- 1995 NAIA Division I women's basketball tournament
- 1995 NAIA Division II women's basketball tournament
