= 1995 NCAA Division III women's basketball tournament =

- Teams: 64
- Finals site: , Columbus, Ohio
- Champions: Capital Crusaders (2nd title)
- Runner-up: Wisconsin–Oshkosh Titans (1st title game)
- Third place: St. Thomas Tommies (2nd Final Four)
- Fourth place: Salem State Vikings (2nd Final Four)
- Winning coach: Dixie Jeffers (2nd title)

The 1995 NCAA Division III women's basketball tournament was the 14th annual tournament hosted by the NCAA to determine the national champion of Division III women's collegiate basketball in the United States.

Defending champions Capital defeated Wisconsin–Oshkosh in the championship game, 59–55, to claim the Crusaders' second Division III national title.

The championship rounds were hosted by Capital University in Columbus, Ohio.

== Bracket ==
- An asterisk by a team indicates the host of first and second round games
- An asterisk by a score indicates an overtime period

=== East sectional ===
Play-in round March 1, 1995; Campus sites
Salem State*	69
Westfield State	64
Northeast Region
Plymouth State	61
Clark (MA)*	74
NYU*	67
Brockport State	61
East Region
Binghamton	55
St. John Fisher*	79
Southern Maine*	63
Trinity (CT)	66
Northeast Region
Middlebury	53
Wheaton (MA)*	74
William Smith*	84
Buffalo State	65
East Region
Hartwick	60
Geneseo State*	86

Second round March 4, 1995; Campus sites
Salem State*	76
Clark (MA)	56
NYU*	70
St. John Fisher	62
Trinity (CT)	76
Wheaton (MA)*	80
William Smith	66
Geneseo State*	81

Sectional semifinals March 10, 1995; Salem, MA
Salem State	81
NYU	78
Wheaton (MA)	66
Geneseo State	69

Sectional finals March 11, 1995; Salem, MA
Salem State	76
Geneseo State	65

=== South sectional ===
Play-in round March 1, 1995; Campus sites
Maryville (TN)*	90
Trinity (TX)	72
South Region
Roanoke	87
Ferrum*	70
Franklin*	78
Manchester	69
Great Lakes Region
Hope	44
Wisconsin–Oshkosh*	68
Marymount (VA)*	91
Christopher Newport	79
South Region
Millsaps	77
Emory*	95
Wisconsin–Whitewater*	72
Wisconsin–River Falls	71
Great Lakes Region
Beloit	56
Wisconsin–Eau Claire	70

Second round March 4, 1995; Campus sites
Maryville (TN)*	90
Roanoke	59
Franklin	57
Wisconsin–Oshkosh*	61
Marymount (VA)	79
Emory*	95
Wisconsin–Whitewater	64
Wisconsin–Eau Claire*	74

Sectional semifinals March 10, 1995; Maryville, TN
Maryville (TN)	67
Wisconsin–Oshkosh	83
Emory	57
Wisconsin–Eau Claire	88

Sectional finals March 11, 1995; Maryville, TN
Wisconsin–Oshkosh	86
Wisconsin–Eau Claire	80

=== Atlantic sectional ===
Play-in round March 1, 1995; Campus sites
Scranton*	65
Gettysburg	73
Mid-Atlantic Region
Cabrini	41
William Paterson*	82
Wittenberg*	58
Defiance	80
Atlantic Region
Mount Union	70
Ohio Wesleyan*	63
Johns Hopkins*	77
Ursinus	67
Mid-Atlantic Region
Montclair State	77
Elizabethtown*	68
Salisbury State*	66
Waynesburg	68
Atlantic Region
Washington and Jefferson	50
Capital*	74

Second round March 4, 1995; Campus sites
Gettysburg	55
William Paterson*	80
Defiance	63
Mount Union*	73
Johns Hopkins*	75
Montclair State	58
Waynesburg	40
Capital*	74

Sectional semifinals March 10, 1995; Alliance, OH
William Paterson	59
Mount Union	58
Johns Hopkins	79
Capital	94

Sectional finals March 11, 1995; Bexley, OH
William Paterson	60
Capital	75

=== West sectional ===
Play-in round March 1, 1995; Campus sites
Millikin*	70
Chicago	53
Central Region
Central (IA)	70
Buena Vista*	65
Claremont-Mudd-Scripps*	63
Cal Lutheran	54
West Region
Gustavus Adolphus	54
St. Thomas (MN)*	66
Luther (IA)*	68
Aurora	72
Central Region
Illinois Wesleyan	69
Washington St. Louis*	75
Concordia Moorhead*	54
Bethel (MN)	50
West Region
UC San Diego	57
St. Benedict*	68

Second round March 4, 1995; Campus sites
Millikin*	66
Central (IA)	58
Claremont-Mudd-Scripps	52
St. Thomas (MN)*	82
Aurora	75
Washington St. Louis*	63
Concordia Moorhead	56
St. Benedict*	71

Sectional semifinals March 10, 1995; St. Paul, MN
Millikin	52
St. Thomas (MN)	82
Aurora	46
St. Benedict	80

Sectional finals March 11, 1995; St. Paul, MN
St. Thomas (MN)	67
St. Benedict	65

=== Final Four ===
Final Four
Salem State	69
Wisconsin–Oshkosh	82
Capital	68
St. Thomas (MN)	59

National championship
Wisconsin–Oshkosh	55
Capital	59
Third place
Salem State	79
St. Thomas (MN)	82*

== All-tournament team ==
- Katie Mang, Capital
- Jill Walker, Capital
- Natalie DeMichei, Wisconsin–Oshkosh
- Wendy Wangerin, Wisconsin–Oshkosh
- Laura Witte, St. Thomas (MN)

== See also ==
- 1995 NCAA Division III men's basketball tournament
- 1995 NCAA Division I women's basketball tournament
- 1995 NCAA Division II women's basketball tournament
- 1995 NAIA Division I women's basketball tournament
- 1995 NAIA Division II women's basketball tournament
