= 1995 NAIA Division I men's basketball tournament =

College basketball tournament

- Teams: 32
- Finals site: Mabee Center; Tulsa, Oklahoma
- Champions: Birmingham Southern (2 title, 2 title game, 2 Fab Four)
- Runner-up: Pfeiffer (1 title game, 3 Fab Four)
- Semifinalists: Belmont (1 Final Four); Arkansas Tech (3 Final Four)
- Charles Stevenson Hustle Award: Justin Thompson (Pfeiffer)
- Chuck Taylor MVP: James Cason (Birmingham Southern)

The 1995 NAIA Men's Division I Basketball Tournament was held in March at Mabee Center in Tulsa, Oklahoma. The 58th annual NAIA basketball tournament featured 32 teams playing in a single-elimination format.

== Awards and honors ==
- Leading scorers:
- Leading rebounder:
- Player of the Year: Nate Driggers (Montevallo).

== 1995 NAIA bracket ==
First round	Second round
1	Belmont	94
-	Spring Arbor	75
1	Belmont	85
-	Geneva	65
-	Geneva	60
16	Minnesota–Morris	50
TOP TIER
-	Central Washington	76
9	St. Mary's (TX)	64
8	The Master’s	88
-	Central Washington	75
8	The Master’s	86
-	SW Oklahoma State	72
5	Birmingham–Southern	107
-	Concord (WV)	70
5	Birmingham Southern	76
12	Oklahoma Christian	54
12	Oklahoma Christian	87
-	Southern–New Orleans	70
TOP TIER
13	Hawaii Pacific	76
-	Mary Hardin–Baylor	69
4	Hawaii Pacific	57
4	Georgia Southwestern	69
4	Georgia Southwestern State	92
-	Olivet Nazarene	83
3	Oklahoma City	107
-	Iowa Wesleyan	75
3	Oklahoma City	98
14	Transylvania	67
14	Transylvania	70
-	Incarnate Word	69
BOTTOM TIER
11	Pfeiffer	83
-	Rio Grande	74
11	Pfeiffer	90
-	Voorhees	88
-	Voorhees	82
6	Georgetown (KY)	81*
7	Arkansas Tech	60
-	Midwestern State	58
7	Arkansas Tech	61
-	Fresno Pacific	50
-	Fresno Pacific	81
10	Columbia (MO)	56
BOTTOM TIER
-	Lipscomb	74
15	Oklahoma Baptist	63
-	Lipscomb	78
-	Montana State Northern	92
-	Montana State–Northern	72
2	Life	71

Elite Eight
1	Belmont	91
8	The Master’s	72
5	Birmingham Southern	109
4	Georgia Southwestern	76
11	Oklahoma City	78
3	Pfeiffer	92
7	Arkansas Tech	87
-	Montana State-Northern	67

NAIA national semifinals
1	Belmont	80
5	Birmingham Southern	90
3	Pfeiffer	68
7	Arkansas Tech	58

NAIA national championship
5	Birmingham Southern	92
3	Pfeiffer	76

- * denotes overtime.

== See also ==
- 1995 NAIA Division II men's basketball tournament
- 1995 NCAA Division I men's basketball tournament
- 1995 NCAA Division II men's basketball tournament
- 1995 NCAA Division III men's basketball tournament
- 1995 NAIA Division I women's basketball tournament
