= 1995 NCAA Division II men's basketball tournament =

- Teams: 48
- Finals site: Commonwealth Convention Center, Louisville, Kentucky
- Champions: Southern Indiana Screaming Eagles (1st title)
- Runner-up: UC Riverside Highlanders (1st title game)
- Semifinalists: Norfolk State Spartans (1st Final Four); Indiana (PA) Crimson Hawks (1st Final Four)
- Winning coach: Bruce Pearl (1st title)
- MOP: William Wilson (UC Riverside)
- Attendance: 130,780

The 1995 NCAA Division II men's basketball tournament involved 48 schools playing in a single-elimination tournament to determine the national champion of men's NCAA Division II college basketball as a culmination of the 1994-95 NCAA Division II men's basketball season. It was won by the University of Southern Indiana and UC Riverside's William Wilson was the Most Outstanding Player.

1995 NCAA Division II Men's sites - regionals (cyan) Elite Eight (red)

== Regionals ==
=== East - Indiana, Pennsylvania ===
Location: Memorial Field House Host: Indiana University of Pennsylvania

First round - at higher seed Round of 48; March 7
4	Gannon	82
5	Bloomsburg	81
3	Millersville	61
6	West Chester	60

Regional semifinals Round of 32; March 10
4	Gannon	71
1	Indiana (PA)	93
3	Millersville	66
2	California (PA)	93

Regional Final; Sweet 16; March 11
1	Indiana (PA)	80
2	California (PA)	69

- Third Place - Millersville 89, Gannon 76

=== South Central - Saint Joseph, Missouri ===
Location: MWSC Fieldhouse Host: Missouri Western State University

First round - at higher seed Round of 48
5	Central Missouri State	95
4	North Alabama	75
6	Mississippi College	87**
3	Washburn	80

Regional semifinals Round of 32
5	Central Missouri State	80
1	Missouri Western State	78
6	Mississippi College	88
2	Central Oklahoma	94

Regional Final; Sweet 16
5	Central Missouri State	117
2	Central Oklahoma	112

- Third Place - Mississippi College 90, Missouri Western State 77

=== West - Riverside, California ===
Location: UCR Student Recreation Center Host: University of California, Riverside

First round - at higher seed Round of 48; March 7
4	UC Davis	92*
5	Grand Canyon	88
6	Cal State LA	70*
3	Cal State Bakersfield	66

Regional semifinals Round of 32; March 10
4	UC Davis	66
1	UC Riverside	84
6	Cal State LA	68
2	Seattle Pacific	76

Regional Final; Sweet 16; March 11
1	UC Riverside	74
2	Seattle Pacific	68

- Third Place - Cal State LA 78, UC Davis 74

=== North Central - Hays, Kansas ===
Location: Gross Memorial Coliseum Host: Fort Hays State University

First round - at higher seed Round of 48; March 7
4	Morningside	92
5	North Dakota	86
3	North Dakota State	85
6	Mesa State	76

Regional semifinals Round of 32; March 10
4	Morningside	93
1	Regis	70
3	North Dakota State	63
2	Fort Hays State	73

Regional Final; Sweet 16; March 11
4	Morningside	85
2	Fort Hays State	82

- Third Place - North Dakota State 84, Regis 72

=== South Atlantic - Fayetteville, North Carolina ===
Location: Felton J. Capel Arena Hosts: Virginia Union University and Fayetteville State University

First round - at higher seed Round of 48; March 7
5	Shaw	83
4	Longwood	76
3	Johnson C. Smith	72
6	Lenoir–Rhyne	71

Regional semifinals Round of 32; March 10
5	Shaw	73
1	Virginia Union	94
3	Johnson C. Smith	61
2	Norfolk State	89

Regional Final; Sweet 16; March 11
1	Virginia Union	66
2	Norfolk State	84

- Third Place - Shaw 96, Johnson C. Smith 90

=== South - Normal, Alabama ===
Location: Elmore Coliseum Host: Alabama A&M University

First round - at higher seed Round of 48; March 7
5	Eckerd	82
4	Lander	79
3	Armstrong Atlantic	78
6	Morehouse	70

Regional semifinals Round of 32; March 10
5	Eckerd	50
1	Alabama A&M	75
3	Armstrong Atlantic	58
2	Tampa	65

Regional Final; Sweet 16
1	Alabama A&M	79
2	Tampa	78

- Third Place - Eckerd 72, Armstrong Atlantic 70

=== Northeast - Manchester, New Hampshire ===
Location: NHC Fieldhouse Host: New Hampshire College

First round - at higher seed Round of 48; March 7
4	Philadelphia U	72
5	Adelphi	60
3	New Hampshire College	95
6	Dowling	79

Regional semifinals Round of 32; March 10
4	Philadelphia U	84
1	St. Anselm	82
3	New Hampshire College	113*
2	St. Rose	110

Regional Final; Sweet 16; March 11
4	Philadelphia U	62
3	New Hampshire College	84

- Third Place - St. Anselm 109, St. Rose 92

=== Great Lakes - Cincinnati, Ohio ===
Location: Riverfront Coliseum Host: Northern Kentucky University

First round - at higher seed Round of 48; March 7
4	Quincy (IL)	116
5	Oakland	94
3	Southern Indiana	95
6	Hillsdale	88

Regional semifinals Round of 32; March 10
4	Quincy (IL)	91
1	Northern Kentucky	97
3	Southern Indiana	102
2	Kentucky Wesleyan	81

Regional Final; Sweet 16; March 11
1	Northern Kentucky	94
3	Southern Indiana	102

- Third Place - Quincy (IL) 111, Kentucky Wesleyan 104

*denotes each overtime played

== Elite Eight - Louisville, Kentucky ==
Location: Commonwealth Convention Center Host: Bellarmine College

National Quarterfinals; Elite Eight; March 22
Indiana (PA)	90
Central Missouri State	79
UC Riverside	71
Morningside	58
Norfolk State	85
Alabama A&M	67
New Hampshire College	93
Southern Indiana	108

National semifinals Final Four; March 23
Indiana (PA)	69
UC Riverside	73
Norfolk State	81
Southern Indiana	89

National Championship; March 25
UC Riverside	63
Southern Indiana	71

*denotes each overtime played

== All-tournament team ==
- Chad Gilbert (Southern Indiana)
- Brian Huebner (Southern Indiana)
- Boo Purdom (UC Riverside)
- Corey Williams (Norfolk State)
- William Wilson (UC Riverside)

== See also ==
- 1995 NCAA Division I men's basketball tournament
- 1995 NCAA Division III men's basketball tournament
- 1995 NAIA Division I men's basketball tournament
- 1995 NAIA Division II men's basketball tournament
- 1995 NCAA Division II women's basketball tournament
