= Dee Kantner =

American basketball referee

- Born: May 3, 1960 (age 65); Reading, Pennsylvania, U.S.
- Occupation: NCAA referee

Dee Kantner (born May 3, 1960) is a women's basketball referee for the National Collegiate Athletic Association since 1984. Kantner started with the Southern Conference before appearing in the Atlantic Coast Conference and Southeastern Conference throughout the 1990s. With the NCAA, Kantner has refereed for various Final Four and championship games since 1992.

Outside of the NCAA, Kantner was one of the first women referees in the National Basketball Association when she started in 1997. She remained with the NBA as a referee until 2002. Kantner has also held the positions of Director of Referee Development and Supervisor of Officials for the Women's National Basketball Association during the 2000s. At individual events, Kantner was a referee at the National Sports Festival in 1991 and the 2000 Summer Olympics. Kantner was inducted into the North Carolina Sports Hall of Fame in 2019.

== Early life and education ==
Kantner was born in Reading, Pennsylvania, on May 3, 1960, and had three siblings. Growing up, Kantner's parents had a marital separation. During her childhood, Kantner took up track and field and basketball. For her post-secondary career, Kantner received an athletic scholarship from the University of Pittsburgh and was on multiple sport teams. She graduated with an engineer's degree in 1982.

== Career ==
While at the University of Pittsburgh in 1982, Kantner became a referee at basketball games for churches. Following her post-secondary education, Kantner started her engineering career as a pipe stress analysis consultant. She continued her engineering experience in the sales department for Westinghouse Electric Corporation during the early 1980s and worked in Asheville, North Carolina. By the early 1990s, Kantner was working in Charlotte, North Carolina, in her sales position. Kantner ended her engineering tenure in 1997, when she was hired as an NBA official.

For her athletic career, Kantner worked for a fitness center in the early 1980s at Pittsburgh. Before becoming an NCAA Division I referee for the Southern Conference in 1984, Kantner had previously refereed basketball games ranging from elementary school to NCAA Division II. During the late 1980s, she expanded her referee experience to the Atlantic Coast Conference and Southeastern Conference. In 1990, Kantner was a referee at an exhibition game for the LSU Tigers men's basketball team. At the time, she was part of the first-ever "major college men's game" to only have women referees alongside Patty Broderick and June Corteau.

During 1992, she worked for the Big Ten Conference and five other conferences simultaneously. In the mid-1990s, Kantner worked as a salesperson for Cutler-Hammer while working as a college basketball referee. By 1997, Kantner was refereeing for eight conferences at the same time. These included the Pac-10 Conference and West Coast Conference. Outside of college basketball, Kantner refereed in 1995 for the Summer Pro League.

In 1997, Kantner was hired as one of the first women referees in the National Basketball Association alongside Violet Palmer. Her first regular season game as an NBA referee was in November 1997 during a match between the Atlanta Hawks and the Philadelphia 76ers. During her time with the NBA, she was the Supervisor of Officials for the Women's National Basketball Association from 1997 to 1998.

Kantner remained with the NBA until she was fired in 2002. After leaving the NBA, she continued to work in the WNBA as the Director of Referee Development from 2002 to 2004 and was renamed Supervisor of Officials in 2004. By 2019, Kantner had remained in her supervisory role with the WNBA for almost 15 years. For the NCAA, Kantner has been a referee in over twenty Final Four rounds since 1992 and over ten championship games in women's basketball.

Outside of the NCAA, Kantner has also worked as a referee for the Continental Basketball Association. At individual events, Kantner was a referee during the National Sports Festival held in 1991. During 1993, she was scheduled to work as a referee during the qualification of the U.S. Olympic Festival. Kantner reffed a quarterfinal game during the women's basketball event at the 2000 Summer Olympics. Kantner is also currently the President of the Kay Yow Cancer Fund’s Board of Directors, as she serves on the board alongside fellow NCAA women’s basketball official Joseph Vaszily. Kantner and Vaszily have been instrumental in encouraging their fellow officials to support the fight against cancers affecting women, as the officiating community contributed $145,000 to the Kay Yow Cancer Fund in 2022.

Outside of basketball, Kantner enjoys beekeeping.

== Honors ==
As part of the Naismith Awards, Kantner was named the Women's Official of the Year in 1997. Kantner was inducted into the North Carolina Sports Hall of Fame in 2019 and the Pennsylvania Sports Hall of Fame in 2022. Kantner was chosen by the Women's Basketball Coaches Association as the winner of their Jostens-Berenson Lifetime Achievement Award in 2023.
