= 1995 NCAA Division III men's basketball tournament =

American collegiate men's basketball tournament (1995)

- Teams: 64
- Finals site: , Buffalo, New York
- Champions: Wisconsin–Platteville Pioneers (2nd title)
- Runner-up: Manchester Spartans (1st title game)
- Semifinalists: Rowan Profs (3rd Final Four); Trinity Bantams (1st Final Four)
- Winning coach: Bo Ryan (UWP)
- MOP: Ernie Peavy (UWP)
- Attendance: 40,207

The 1995 NCAA Division III men's basketball tournament was the 21st annual single-elimination tournament to determine the national champions of National Collegiate Athletic Association (NCAA) men's Division III collegiate basketball in the United States.

The field expanded to sixty-four teams allocated across four sectionals, however, this would only last for three tournaments (The sixty-four team field did not return after 1997 until 2017). The national semifinals, third-place final, and championship final were contested in Buffalo, New York.

Wisconsin–Platteville defeated Manchester, 69–55, in the final, clinching their second national title (and first since 1991).

The Pioneers (31–0) were led by future Wisconsin coach Bo Ryan and were the first men's Division III program to complete an undefeated season since Potsdam in 1986.

== Bracket ==
=== Top left sectional ===
First round
Geneseo	74
RIT	53
Albany	92
St. John Fisher	84
Rowan	70
Montclair State	45
NYU	101
Hunter	71
Buffalo State	58
Elmira	49
Hamilton	83
Plattsburgh State	74
Jersey City State	109
Staten Island	91
NJIT	87
York (NY)	70

Second round
Geneseo	71
Albany	70
Rowan	74
NYU	58
Buffalo State	64
Hamilton	79
Jersey City State	86
NJIT	97

Sectional semifinals
Geneseo	64
Rowan	76
Hamilton	86
NJIT	96

Sectional finals
Rowan	101
NJIT	87

=== Bottom left sectional ===
First round
Baldwin Wallace	72
Hope	69
Calvin	57
Wittenberg	62
Illinois Wesleyan	115
Westminster (MO)	74
Beloit	60
Washington St. Louis	68
Kenyon	74
Ohio Northern	72
Heidelberg	64
Wooster	72
Hanover	79
Wheaton (IL)	78
Manchester	93
Ripon	70

Second round
Baldwin Wallace	74
Wittenberg	70
Illinois Wesleyan	90
Washington St. Louis	65
Kenyon	57
Wooster	55
Hanover	79
Manchester	84

Sectional semifinals
Baldwin Wallace	51
Illinois Wesleyan	67
Kenyon	65
Manchester	84

Sectional finals
Illinois Wesleyan	82
Manchester	89

=== Top right sectional ===
First round
Christopher Newport	71
Hampden-Sydney	78
Greensboro	87
Oglethorpe	72
Central (IA)	58
St. Thomas (MN)	62
Nebraska Wesleyan	120
Simpson	79
Maryville (TN)	77
Roanoke	76
Hendrix	67
Millsaps	79
Pomona-Pitzer	70
Wisconsin–Whitewater	82
Saint John's (MN)	67
Wisconsin–Platteville	99

Second round
Hampden-Sydney	105
Greensboro	79
St. Thomas (MN)	74
Nebraska Wesleyan	94
Maryville (TN)	86
Millsaps	88**
Wisconsin–Whitewater	88
Wisconsin–Platteville	100

Sectional semifinals
Hampden-Sydney	77
Nebraska Wesleyan	65
Millsaps	68
Wisconsin–Platteville	82

Sectional finals
Hampden-Sydney	85
Wisconsin–Platteville	99

=== Bottom right sectional ===
First round
Salve Regina	77
UMass Dartmouth	117
Colby	66
Williams	80
Goucher	102
Lebanon Valley	91
Widener	60
Wilkes	70
Salem State	86
Tufts	80
Babson	89
Trinity (CT)	95
Cabrini	88
York (PA)	63
Franklin & Marshall	69
Muhlenberg	54

Second round
UMass Dartmouth	59
Williams	61
Goucher	70
Wilkes	88
Salem State	90
Trinity (CT)	93*
Cabrini	83
Franklin & Marshall	87

Sectional semifinals
Williams	89
Wilkes	91*
Trinity (CT)	79
Franklin & Marshall	58

Sectional finals
Wilkes	85
Trinity (CT)	90

=== National finals ===
- Site: Buffalo, New York

National Semifinals
Rowan	66
Manchester	77
Wisconsin–Platteville	93
Trinity (CT)	83

National Championship
Manchester	55
Wisconsin–Platteville	69
National Third-place
Rowan	105
Trinity (CT)	72

== All-tournament team ==
- Ernie Peavy, Wisconsin–Platteville
- Brad Knoy, Manchester
- Kyle Hupfer, Manchester
- Aaron Lancaster, Wisconsin–Platteville
- Charles Grasty, Rowan

== See also ==
- 1995 NCAA Division I men's basketball tournament
- 1995 NCAA Division II men's basketball tournament
- 1995 NAIA Division I men's basketball tournament
- 1995 NAIA Division II men's basketball tournament
- 1995 NCAA Division III women's basketball tournament
