= 1995 NAIA Division II men's basketball tournament =

- Teams: 32
- Finals site: Montgomery Fieldhouse; Nampa, Idaho
- Champions: Bethel Pilots (1st title, 1st title game)
- Runner-up: Northwest Nazarene Crusaders (1st title game)
- Semifinalists: Northern State Wolves; William Jewell Cardinals
- Charles Stevenson Hustle Award: Bob Tomminga (Northwest Nazarene)
- Chuck Taylor MVP: Mark Galloway (Bethel (IN))
- Top scorer: Mark Galloway (Bethel (IN)) (127 points)

The 1995 NAIA Division II men's basketball tournament was the tournament held by the NAIA to determine the national champion of men's college basketball among its Division II members in the United States and Canada for the 1994–95 basketball season.

Bethel (IN) defeated hosts Northwest Nazarene in the championship game, 103–95 after overtime, to claim the Pilots' first NAIA national title.

The tournament was played at the Montgomery Fieldhouse at Northwest Nazarene University in Nampa, Idaho.

== Qualification ==
The tournament field expanded for the second time in two years, increasing by eight teams from twenty-four to thirty-two teams. The top sixteen teams were now seeded, and no teams were given a bye into the second round.

The tournament continued to utilize a single-elimination format.

== Bracket ==
First round
1	Northern State (SD)	90
Howard Payne	78
MidAmerica Nazarene	86
16	Alice Lloyd	96
9	Viterbo	97
Webber International	84
Husson	91
8	Hastings	111
5	Northwest Nazarene	87
Trinity International	73
Ottawa (KS)	64
12	St. Thomas Aquinas	70
13	Mount Vernon Nazarene	69
Willamette	96
Westbrook	81
4	Indiana Tech	84
3	Bethel	89
Minot State	69
Lewis & Clark	85
14	Edgewood	66
11	Nova Southeastern	93
Milligan	85
Wilmington (DE)	64
6	College of the Ozarks	77
7	Albertson	72
Ohio Dominican	73
Nyack	82
10	William Jewell	97
15	Dakota Wesleyan	75
St. Ambrose	79
Loyola New Orleans	69
2	Concordia (NE)	90

Second round
1	Northern State (SD)	98
16	Alice Lloyd	91
9	Viterbo	86
8	Hastings	88
5	Northwest Nazarene	83
12	St. Thomas Aquinas	66
Willamette	90
4	Indiana Tech	63
3	Bethel	96
Lewis & Clark	79
11	Nova Southeastern	70
6	College of the Ozarks	81
Ohio Dominican	78
10	William Jewell	82
St. Ambrose	84
2	Concordia (NE)	100

Quarterfinals
1	Northern State (SD)	101
8	Hastings	96
5	Northwest Nazarene	69
Willamette	64
3	Bethel	99
6	College of the Ozarks	67
10	William Jewell	91
2	Concordia (NE)	68

Semifinals
1	Northern State (SD)	62
5	Northwest Nazarene	67
3	Bethel	96
10	William Jewell	87

National championship
5	Northwest Nazarene	95
3	Bethel	103*

== See also ==
- 1995 NAIA Division I men's basketball tournament
- 1995 NCAA Division I men's basketball tournament
- 1995 NCAA Division II men's basketball tournament
- 1995 NCAA Division III men's basketball tournament
- 1995 NAIA Division II women's basketball tournament
