= 1995 NCAA Division I women's basketball tournament =

American college basketball tournament

- Teams: 64
- Finals site: Target Center, Minneapolis, Minnesota
- Champions: Connecticut Huskies (1st title, 1st title game, 2nd Final Four)
- Runner-up: Tennessee Volunteers (5th title game, 8th Final Four)
- Semifinalists: Stanford Cardinal (4th Final Four); Georgia Bulldogs (3rd Final Four)
- Winning coach: Geno Auriemma (1st title)
- MOP: Rebecca Lobo (Connecticut)

The 1995 NCAA Division I women's basketball tournament featured 64 teams. The Final Four consisted of Connecticut, Tennessee, Stanford, and Georgia. Connecticut defeated Tennessee 70–64 to win its first NCAA title and complete a 35–0 undefeated season.

The first two rounds were held at the home court of the top four seeds in each region (except for San Diego State, which hosted three games in the West region). The regional semifinals and finals were held at the University of Connecticut for the East region, UCLA for the West region, the University of Tennessee for the Mideast region, and Drake University for the Midwest region. The Final Four was played in Minneapolis, Minnesota.

== Notable events ==
In a second-round game, 4 seed Alabama faced the 5 seed Duke. The game was close throughout the contest, with neither team leading the other by more than seven points. With time winding down in regulation, Alabama's Niesa Johnson hit a three-pointer to send the game to overtime. Not just one overtime, the game would eventually feature four overtimes. Johnson went on to hit two free throws at the end of the fourth overtime to give Alabama a 121–120 victory, setting records for the most overtimes, and the most points scored in an NCAA tournament game. At the time, it was called "the best women's basketball game in history".

In the east regional semi-final involving Louisiana Tech and Virginia, confusion reigned momentarily with both teams celebrating at the end of regulation. Louisiana Tech led early, with as much as a 13-point lead in the first half and a ten-point lead at halftime. The Cavaliers came back and had a 63–62 lead with seconds left in the game. With time running out, Louisiana Tech's Debra Williams went to the foul line for a one-and-one shot. She missed it, but the scorekeeper accidentally recorded it, so the scoreboard showed 63–63. Louisiana Tech tried and missed a last second shot, but thought they were headed to overtime based upon the score, while Virginia thought they had won, so both teams were celebrating. The referees met at the scores table to sort it out, then Dee Kantner emerged and pointed to the Virginia bench signaling victory.

Georgia and Tennessee, both from the SEC, squared off in one of the Final Four match ups. Tennessee was a number 1 seed, while Georgia was a 3 seed, and upset top seed Colorado 82–79 in the Midwest Rational final. The two teams had faced each other in the final game of the regular season, when the Lady Vols beat the Lady Bulldogs by 22 points. Georgia coach Andy Landers complained about lack of effort in that game, but did not have the same complaints in the Final Four game, even though the final margin was identical. Tennessee's Pat Summitt emphasizes rebounds, and Tennessee out rebounded Georgia 51–33. While the Lady Bulldogs were able to get within seven points in the second half, they could get no closer and Tennessee prevailed 73–51, to send them into the champions ship game.

Despite entering the game against Stanford with an undefeated record, some skeptics weren't convinced that Connecticut could win. Although UConn had beaten Tennessee earlier in the year, they then played in the Big East, which at the time wasn't a strong conference. The Big East earned just two invitations to the NCAA tournament, while eight other conferences had three or more teams in the tournament. Stanford was a representative of the Pacific-10 conference, which had five teams strong enough to earn bids. However, the Huskies jumped out to an early 16–4 lead, and ended the game with a 27-point margin, winning 87–60. Kara Wolters scored 31 points, a single point under her career high while Jamelle Elliott matched her career high with 21 points. Consensus national player of the year Rebecca Lobo added 17 points, prompting coach Auriemma to quip "The reason we're playing [in the final] is I've got these three players [and Tara VanDerveer doesn't.]"

In the championship game, Tennessee had a small lead in the first half 28–25, but more importantly, two of UConn's All-Americans, Jennifer Rizzotti and Rebecca Lobo, had three fouls, while six foot seven inch Kara Wolters had two. Auriemma tried playing small, with six foot Jamelle Elliott the tallest Husky on the floor. The Tennessee lead extended, but only to six points at the half. In the second half, the lead was still four points in the Lady Vols favor when Wolters received her fourth foul. With twelve minutes left to go in the game, Lobo had but six points. Lobo then scored on four possessions, and with a steal by Rizzotti turned into a layup, the Tennessee nine point lead was down to a single point, prompting coach Summitt to call for a time-out. Jamelle Elliott tied the game with just over two minutes left, then Rizzotti made a play which would be talked about for years afterward. She grabbed a rebound, then drove the length of the court against Michelle M. Marciniak. Just before reaching the basket, she executed a cross-over dribble and sank a left-handed layup to take a lead that would never be relinquished. UConn won the game 70–64, completing the first undefeated season in NCAA history since the 1986 Texas team, and winning the first national championship for the Connecticut Huskies team.

== Tournament records ==
- Free Throws – Connecticut made 34 free throws in the semi-final game against Stanford, setting the record for most free throws completed in a Final Four.
- Most points – Alabama scored 121 points in a four overtime game against Duke, setting the record for most points scored in an NCAA tournament game. The 120 pins scored by Duke is the second most scored in an NCAA tournament game, and the most in a losing effort.
- Field goals attempted – Alabama attempted 114 fields goals in the game against Duke, setting the record for most field goals attempted in an NCAA tournament game.
- Most overtimes – Alabama and Duke played in a four overtime game, the most overtimes in an NCAA tournament game.

== Qualifying teams – automatic ==
Sixty-four teams were selected to participate in the 1995 NCAA Tournament. Thirty-two conferences were eligible for an automatic bid to the 1995 NCAA Tournament .

Automatic bids
		Record		
Qualifying School	Conference	Regular Season	Conference	Seed
University of Colorado at Boulder	Big Eight	27–2	14–0	1
University of Connecticut	Big East	29–0	18–0	1
Dartmouth College	Ivy League	16–10	12–2	14
Drake University	Missouri Valley Conference	24–5	13–5	5
Florida International University	Trans America	26–4	15–1	9
Florida A&M	MEAC	24–5	14–2	16
Furman University	Southern Conference	18–11	10–4	15
The George Washington University	Atlantic 10	24–5	14–2	4
College of the Holy Cross	Patriot League	21–8	12–2	16
Jackson State University	SWAC	22–5	12–2	15
Loyola University Maryland	MAAC	20–8	7–6	10
University of Maine	North Atlantic Conference	24–5	14–2	16
Marquette University	Great Midwest	19–11	9–3	10
University of Montana	Big Sky Conference	25–6	12–2	12
Mount St. Mary's University	Northeast Conference	24–5	17–1	13
University of North Carolina	ACC	28–4	12–4	3
Northern Illinois University	Midwestern Collegiate	17–13	10–6	16
Old Dominion University	Colonial	27–5	13–1	8
Pennsylvania State University	Big Ten	25–4	13–3	2
Radford University	Big South Conference	16–13	11–5	11
University of San Francisco	West Coast Conference	24–4	13–1	11
University of Southern Mississippi	Metro	21–8	7–5	7
Stanford University	Pac-10	26–2	17–1	2
Stephen F. Austin State University	Southland	22–7	15–3	11
Tennessee State University	Ohio Valley Conference	22–6	12–4	12
Texas Tech University	Southwest	30–3	13–1	2
University of Toledo	MAC	24–6	15–3	13
University of California, Irvine	Big West Conference	19–10	12–6	15
University of Utah	WAC	23–6	12–2	8
Vanderbilt University	SEC	26–6	8–3	1
Western Illinois University	Mid-Continent	17–11	14–4	14
Western Kentucky University	Sun Belt Conference	26–3	12–2	4

== Qualifying teams – at-large ==
Thirty-two additional teams were selected to complete the six-four invitations.

At-large Bids
		Record		
Qualifying School	Conference	Regular Season	Conference	Seed
University of Alabama	Southeastern	20–8	7–4	4
University of Arkansas	Southeastern	22–6	7–4	6
DePaul University	Great Midwest	20–8	9–3	13
Duke University	Atlantic Coast	21–8	10–6	5
University of Florida	Southeastern	23–8	7–4	6
University of Georgia	Southeastern	24–4	8–3	3
Indiana University	Big Ten	19–9	8–8	14
University of Kansas	Big Eight	20–10	8–6	7
Louisiana Tech University	Sun Belt	26–4	13–1	2
University of Louisville	Metro	24–7	7–5	11
University of Memphis	Great Midwest	21–7	10–2	8
University of Mississippi (Ole Miss)	Southeastern	21–7	6–5	12
Missouri State University	Missouri Valley	20–11	14–4	9
North Carolina State University	Atlantic Coast	19–9	11–5	7
Ohio University	Mid-American	23–6	15–3	14
University of Oklahoma	Big Eight	21–8	11–3	7
Oklahoma State University–Stillwater	Big Eight	17–11	7–7	12
University of Oregon	Pacific-10	18–9	11–7	6
Oregon State University	Pacific-10	20–7	12–6	5
University of Portland	West Coast	23–6	12–2	13
Purdue University	Big Ten	21–7	13–3	4
San Diego State University	Western Athletic	24–5	14–0	5
Seton Hall University	Big East	23–8	12–6	6
Southern Methodist University	Southwest	20–9	9–5	10
University of Southern California	Pacific-10	18–9	10–8	9
Saint Joseph's University	Atlantic 10	20–8	11–5	9
University of Tennessee	Southeastern	29–2	11–0	1
Tulane University	Metro	19–9	9–3	15
University of Virginia	Atlantic Coast	24–4	16–0	3
Virginia Tech	Metro	21–8	10–2	8
University of Washington	Pacific-10	23–8	13–5	3
University of Wisconsin–Madison	Big Ten	19–8	11–5	10

== Bids by conference ==
Thirty-two conferences earned an automatic bid. In seventeen cases, the automatic bid was the only representative from the conference. Thirty-two additional at-large teams were selected from fifteen of the conferences.

Bids	Conference	Teams
7	Southeastern	Vanderbilt, Alabama, Arkansas, Florida, Georgia, Ole Miss, Tennessee
5	Pacific-10	Stanford, Oregon, Oregon St., Southern California, Washington
4	Big Eight	Colorado, Kansas, Oklahoma, Oklahoma St.
4	Big Ten	Penn St., Indiana, Purdue, Wisconsin
4	Metro	Southern Miss., Louisville, Tulane, Virginia Tech
4	Atlantic Coast	North Carolina, Duke, North Carolina St., Virginia
3	Great Midwest	Marquette, DePaul, Memphis
2	Sun Belt	Western Ky., Louisiana Tech
2	Atlantic 10	George Washington, St. Joseph's
2	Big East	Connecticut, Seton Hall
2	Mid-American	Toledo, Ohio
2	Missouri Valley	Drake, Missouri St.
2	Southwest	Texas Tech, SMU
2	West Coast	San Francisco, Portland
2	Western Athletic	Utah, San Diego St.
1	Big Sky	Montana
1	Big South	Radford
1	Big West	UC Irvine
1	Colonial	Old Dominion
1	Ivy	Dartmouth
1	Metro Atlantic	Loyola Md
1	Mid-Continent	Western Illinois.
1	Mid-Eastern	Florida A&M
1	Midwestern Collegiate	Northern Illinois
1	North Atlantic	Maine
1	Northeast	Mt. St. Mary's
1	Ohio Valley	Tennessee St.
1	Patriot	Holy Cross
1	Southern	Furman
1	Southland	Stephen F. Austin
1	Southwestern	Jackson St.
1	Trans America Athletic	Florida International

== First and second rounds ==
1995 NCAA first and second round venues

In 1995, the field remained at 64 teams. The teams were seeded, and assigned to four geographic regions, with seeds 1–16 in each region. In Round 1, seeds 1 and 16 faced each other, as well as seeds 2 and 15, seeds 3 and 14, seeds 4 and 13, seeds 5 and 12, seeds 6 and 11, seeds 7 and 10, and seeds 8 and 9. In the first two rounds, the top four seeds were given the opportunity to host the first-round game. In most cases, the higher seed accepted the opportunity. The exception:

- Fourth seeded Purdue was eligible to host, but unable to, so fifth seeded San Diego State hosted three first and second-round games

The following table lists the region, host school, venue and the sixteen first and second round locations:

Region	Rnd	Host	Venue	City	State
East	1&2	University of Virginia	University Hall (University of Virginia)	Charlottesville	Virginia
East	1&2	University of Connecticut	Harry A. Gampel Pavilion	Storrs	Connecticut
East	1&2	University of Alabama	Coleman Coliseum	Tuscaloosa	Alabama
East	1&2	Louisiana Tech University	Thomas Assembly Center	Ruston	Louisiana
Mideast	1&2	Western Kentucky University	E.A. Diddle Arena	Bowling Green	Kentucky
Mideast	1&2	University of Washington	Hec Edmundson Pavilion	Seattle	Washington
Mideast	1&2	University of Tennessee	Thompson-Boling Arena	Knoxville	Tennessee
Mideast	1&2	Texas Tech University	Lubbock Municipal Coliseum	Lubbock	Texas
Midwest	1&2	University of Georgia	Georgia Coliseum (Stegeman Coliseum)	Athens	Georgia
Midwest	1&2	Pennsylvania State University	Recreation Building (Rec Hall)	University Park	Pennsylvania
Midwest	1&2	University of Colorado	CU Events Center (Coors Events Center)	Boulder	Colorado
Midwest	1&2	George Washington University	Charles E. Smith Athletic Center	Washington	District of Columbia
West	1&2	University of North Carolina	Carmichael Auditorium	Chapel Hill	North Carolina
West	1&2	Vanderbilt University	Memorial Gymnasium (Vanderbilt University)	Nashville	Tennessee
West	1&2	Stanford University	Maples Pavilion	Stanford	California
West	1&2	San Diego State	Peterson Gym	San Diego	California

== Regionals and Final Four ==
1995 NCAA regionals and Final Four

The Regionals, named for the general location, were held from March 23 to March 25 at these sites:

- East Regional Harry A. Gampel Pavilion, Storrs, Connecticut (Host: University of Connecticut)
- Mideast Regional Thompson-Boling Arena, Knoxville, Tennessee (Host: University of Tennessee)
- West Regional Pauley Pavilion, Los Angeles, California (Host: University of California, Los Angeles)
- Midwest Regional Knapp Center, Des Moines, Iowa (Host: Drake University)

Each regional winner advanced to the Final Four held April 1 and April 2 in Minneapolis, Minnesota at the Target Center,

== Bids by state ==
The sixty-four teams came from thirty-three states, plus Washington, D.C. California had the most teams with five bids. Seventeen states did not have any teams receiving bids.

NCAA Women's basketball Tournament invitations by state 1995

Bids	State	Teams
5	California	San Francisco, Stanford, UC Irvine, San Diego St., Southern California
4	Tennessee	Tennessee St., Vanderbilt, Memphis, Tennessee
4	Virginia	Old Dominion, Radford, Virginia, Virginia Tech
3	Florida	FIU, Florida A&M, Florida
3	Mississippi	Jackson St., Southern Miss., Ole Miss
3	Oregon	Oregon, Oregon St., Portland
3	Texas	Stephen F. Austin, Texas Tech, SMU
3	Illinois	Northern Illinois, Western Illinois, DePaul
3	North Carolina	North Carolina, Duke, North Carolina St.
2	Indiana	Indiana, Purdue
2	Kentucky	Western Ky., Louisville
2	Louisiana	Louisiana Tech, Tulane
2	Maryland	Loyola Md, Mt. St. Mary's
2	Ohio	Toledo, Ohio
2	Oklahoma	Oklahoma, Oklahoma St.
2	Pennsylvania	Penn St., St. Joseph's
2	Wisconsin	Marquette, Wisconsin
1	Alabama	Alabama
1	Arkansas	Arkansas
1	Colorado	Colorado
1	Connecticut	Connecticut
1	District of Columbia	George Washington
1	Georgia	Georgia
1	Iowa	Drake
1	Kansas	Kansas
1	Maine	Maine
1	Massachusetts	Holy Cross
1	Missouri	Missouri St.
1	Montana	Montana
1	New Hampshire	Dartmouth
1	New Jersey	Seton Hall
1	South Carolina	Furman
1	Utah	Utah
1	Washington	Washington

== Bracket ==
=== East region - Storrs, Connecticut ===
First round March 16
1	Connecticut	105
16	Maine	75
Storrs, CT
8	Virginia Tech	62
9	Saint Joseph's	52
5	Duke	76
12	Oklahoma State	64
Tuscaloosa, AL
4	Alabama	82
13	Mount St. Mary's	55
6	Florida	89
11	Radford	49
Charlottesville, VA
3	Virginia	71
14	Dartmouth	68
7	Oklahoma	90
10	Loyola Maryland	55
Ruston, LA
2	Louisiana Tech	90
15	Furman	52

Second round March 18
1	Connecticut	91
8	Virginia Tech	45
5	Duke	120
4	Alabama	121^{4OT}
6	Florida	67
3	Virginia	72
7	Oklahoma	36
2	Louisiana Tech	48

Regional semifinals March 23
1	Connecticut	87
4	Alabama	56
3	Virginia	63
2	Louisiana Tech	62

Regional finals March 25
1	Connecticut	67
3	Virginia	63

=== West region - Los Angeles, California ===
First round March 16 and 17
1	Vanderbilt	90
16	Northern Illinois	44
Nashville, TN – Fri/Sun
8	Memphis	74
9	USC	72
5	San Diego State	46
12	Montana	57
San Diego, CA – Thu/Sat
4	Purdue	74
13	Portland	59
6	Seton Hall	73
11	Stephen F. Austin	63
Chapel Hill, NC – Thu/Sat
3	North Carolina	89
14	Western Illinois	48
7	Southern Miss	95
10	SMU	96^{OT}
Stanford, CA – Thu/Sat
2	Stanford	88
15	UC Irvine	55

Second round March 18 and 19
1	Vanderbilt	95
8	Memphis	68
12	Montana	51
4	Purdue	62
6	Seton Hall	45
3	North Carolina	59
10	SMU	73
2	Stanford	95

Regional semifinals March 23
1	Vanderbilt	66
4	Purdue	67
3	North Carolina	71
2	Stanford	81

Regional finals March 25
4	Purdue	58
2	Stanford	69

=== Mideast region - Knoxville, Tennessee ===
First round March 16 and 17
1	Tennessee	96
16	Florida A&M	59
Knoxville, TN – Thu/Sat
8	Old Dominion	76
9	FIU	81
5	Oregon State	88^{OT}
12	Tennessee State	75
Bowling Green, KY – Fri/Sun
4	Western Kentucky	77
13	Toledo	63
6	Arkansas	67
11	San Francisco	58
Seattle, WA – Thu/Sat
3	Washington	73
14	Ohio	56
7	Kansas	72
10	Wisconsin	73
Lubbock, TX – Thu/Sat
2	Texas Tech	87
15	Tulane	72

Second round March 18 and 19
1	Tennessee	70
9	FIU	44
5	Oregon State	78
4	Western Kentucky	85
6	Arkansas	50
3	Washington	54
10	Wisconsin	65
2	Texas Tech	88

Regional semifinals March 23
1	Tennessee	87
4	Western Kentucky	65
3	Washington	52
2	Texas Tech	67

Regional finals March 25
1	Tennessee	80
2	Texas Tech	59

=== Midwest region - Des Moines, Iowa ===
First round March 16 and 17
1	Colorado	83
16	Holy Cross	49
Boulder, CO – Thu/Sat
8	Utah	47
9	Southwest Missouri State	49
5	Drake	87^{OT}
12	Ole Miss	81
Washington, DC – Fri/Sun
4	George Washington	87
13	DePaul	79
6	Oregon	65
11	Louisville	67
Athens, GA – Fri/Sun
3	Georgia	81
14	Indiana	64
7	NC State	77
10	Marquette	62
University Park, PA – Fri/Sun
2	Penn State	75
15	Jackson State	62

Second round March 18 and 19
1	Colorado	78
9	Southwest Missouri State	34
5	Drake	93
4	George Washington	96^{OT}
11	Louisville	68
3	Georgia	81
7	NC State	76
2	Penn State	74

Regional semifinals March 23
1	Colorado	77
4	George Washington	61
3	Georgia	98
7	NC State	79

Regional finals March 25
1	Colorado	79
3	Georgia	82

=== Final Four – Minneapolis, Minnesota ===
National semifinals April 1
1E	Connecticut	87
2W	Stanford	60
1ME	Tennessee	73
3MW	Georgia	51

National Finals; April 2
1E	Connecticut	70
1ME	Tennessee	64

* denotes number of overtime periods

== Record by conference ==
Seventeen conferences had more than one bid, or at least one win in NCAA Tournament play:

Conference	# of Bids	Record	Win %	Round of 32	Sweet Sixteen	Elite Eight	Final Four	Championship Game
Southeastern	7	15–7	.682	6	4	2	2	1
Pacific-10	5	7–5	.583	3	2	1	1	–
Atlantic Coast	4	8–4	.667	4	3	1	–	–
Big Ten	4	5–4	.556	3	1	1	–	–
Big Eight	4	4–4	.500	2	1	1	–	–
Metro	4	2–4	.333	2	–	–	–	–
Great Midwest	3	1–3	.250	1	–	–	–	–
Big East	2	7–1	.875	2	1	1	1	1
Southwest	2	4–2	.667	2	1	1	–	–
Sun Belt	2	4–2	.667	2	2	–	–	–
Atlantic 10	2	2–2	.500	1	1	–	–	–
Missouri Valley	2	2–2	.500	2	–	–	–	–
Mid-American	2	0–2	–	–	–	–	–	–
West Coast	2	0–2	–	–	–	–	–	–
Western Athletic	2	0–2	–	–	–	–	–	–
Big Sky	1	1–1	.500	1	–	–	–	–
Trans America	1	1–1	.500	1	–	–	–	–

Fifteen conferences went 0-1: Big South Conference, Big West Conference, Colonial, Ivy League, MAAC, Mid-Continent, MEAC, Midwestern Collegiate, North Atlantic Conference, Northeast Conference, Ohio Valley Conference, Patriot League, Southern Conference, Southland, and SWAC

== All-Tournament team ==
- Rebecca Lobo, Connecticut
- Jamelle Elliott, Connecticut
- Jennifer Rizzotti, Connecticut
- Kara Wolters, Connecticut
- Nikki McCray, Tennessee

== Game officials ==
- Sally Bell (semifinal)
- Art Bomengen (semifinal)
- Violet Palmer (semifinal)
- Sidney Bunch (semifinal)
- Dee Kantner (final)
- Larry Sheppard (final)

== See also ==
- 1995 NCAA Division I men's basketball tournament
- 1995 NCAA Division II women's basketball tournament
- 1995 NCAA Division III women's basketball tournament
- 1995 NAIA Division I women's basketball tournament
- 1995 NAIA Division II women's basketball tournament
