= 1994 in basketball =

The following are the basketball events of the year 1994 throughout the world.

== Championships ==
=== World Championship ===
- Men
  - United States 137, Russia 91
- Women
  - United States 100, Australia 95

=== Professional ===
- Men
  - 1994 NBA Finals: Houston Rockets over the New York Knicks 4-3. MVP: Hakeem Olajuwon
    - 1994 NBA Playoffs
    - 1993-94 NBA season
    - 1994 NBA draft
    - 1994 NBA All-Star Game
  - Eurobasket: None
- Women
  - Eurobasket Women: None

=== College ===
- Men
  - NCAA
    - Division I: Arkansas 76, Duke 72
    - NIT: Villanova University def. Vanderbilt University
    - Division II: California State University-Bakersfield 92, University of Southern Indiana 86
    - Division III: Lebanon Valley College 66, 59 New York University OT
  - NAIA
    - Division I Oklahoma City University 86, Georgetown College KY 80
    - Division II Eureka College IL 98, Northern State University SD 95 OT
  - NJCAA
    - Division I Hutchinson Community College 78, Three Rivers Community College (MO) 74
    - Division II Joliet Junior College IL 85, Owens Technical College OH 80
    - Division III Gloucester County College 71, Sullivan County CC 69
- Women
  - NCAA
    - Division I: North Carolina 60, Louisiana Tech University 59
    - Division II: North Dakota State 89, Cal State San Bernardino 56
    - Division III: Capital 82, Washington (Mo.) 63
  - NAIA
    - Division I: Southern Nazarene (Okla.) 97, David Lipscomb (Tenn.) 74
    - Division II Northern State University (S.D.) 48, Western Oregon 45
  - NJCAA
    - Division I Trinity Valley CC 104, Westark Community College, Ark. 95
    - Division II Southwestern Michigan College 81, Chattahoochee Valley CC 72
    - Division III Anoka-Ramsey Community College 69, Triton College 62

== Awards and honors ==
=== Professional ===
- Men
  - NBA Most Valuable Player Award: Hakeem Olajuwon, Houston Rockets
  - NBA Rookie of the Year Award: Chris Webber Golden State Warriors
  - NBA Defensive Player of the Year Award: Hakeem Olajuwon, Houston Rockets
  - NBA Coach of the Year Award: Lenny Wilkens, Atlanta Hawks

=== Collegiate ===
- Naismith College Player of the Year
  - Men: Glenn Robinson, Purdue
  - Women: Lisa Leslie, USC
- Naismith College Coach of the Year
  - Men: Nolan Richardson Arkansas
  - Women: Pat Summitt Tennessee

=== Naismith Memorial Basketball Hall of Fame ===
- Class of 1994:
  - Carol Blazejowski
  - Denny Crum
  - Chuck Daly
  - Buddy Jeannette
  - Cesare Rubini

== Movies ==
- Above the Rim
- The Air Up There
- Blue Chips
- Hoop Dreams

== Births ==
- March 6 — Awa Sissoko, French basketball player

== Deaths ==
- March 13 — Sam Ranzino, All-American at NC State (born 1927)
- May 3 — Vladimir Kostin, FIBA Hall of Fame Russian referee (born 1921)
- June 25 — Katrín Axelsdóttir, Icelandic national team player (born 1956)
- July 10 — Earl Strom, Hall of Fame NBA and ABA referee (born 1927)
- September 3 — Glen Rose, American college player and coach (Arkansas) (born 1905)
- November 11 — Frank McGuire, Hall of Fame coach of the undefeated 1957 National Champion North Carolina Tar Heels (born 1914)
- November 20 — Jānis Krūmiņš, Latvian (Soviet) Olympic Silver medalist (1956, 1960, 1964) (born 1930)
