= 1994 National Invitation Tournament =

Annual NCAA basketball competition

- Season: 1993–94
- Teams: 32
- Finals site: Madison Square Garden, New York City
- Champions: Villanova Wildcats (1st title)
- Runner-up: Vanderbilt Commodores (2nd title game)
- Semifinalists: Siena Saints (1st semifinal); Kansas State Wildcats (1st semifinal)
- Winning coach: Steve Lappas (1st title)
- MVP: Doremus Bennerman (Siena)

The 1994 National Invitation Tournament was the 1994 edition of the annual NCAA college basketball competition.

Of note, in Kansas State's 115–77 victory over Fresno State in the quarterfinals, Askia Jones of Kansas State set the NCAA postseason record of 14 three-point field goals. His final total of 62 points, spurred by nine consecutive successful three-point shots bridging the first and second halves, was also the second-highest scoring output in major-college postseason history.

Doremus Bennerman of Siena won MVP after scoring 174 points in 5 NIT games. The total remains a tournament record.

== Selected teams ==
Below is a list of the 32 teams selected for the tournament.

Team	Conference	Overall record	Appearance	Last bid
Arizona State	Pac-10	15–12	5th	1993
Bradley	Missouri Valley	21–7	16th	1985
BYU	WAC	21–9	7th	1987
Canisius	MAAC	22–6	4th	1985
Clemson	ACC	16–15	9th	1993
Davidson	SoCon	22–7	2nd	1972
DePaul	Great Midwest	16–11	11th	1990
Duquesne	Atlantic 10	16–12	16th	1981
Evansville	Midwestern Collegiate	21–10	2nd	1988
Fresno State	WAC	19–10	3rd	1985
Georgia Tech	ACC	16–12	4th	1984
Gonzaga	West Coast	21–7	1st	Never
Kansas State	Big Eight	17–12	3rd	1992
Manhattan	MAAC	19–10	15th	1992
Miami (OH)	MAC	19–10	3rd	1993
Mississippi State	SEC	18–10	3rd	1990
Murray State	OVC	23–5	5th	1989
New Orleans	Sun Belt	19–9	5th	1990
Northwestern	Big Ten	14–13	2nd	1983
Oklahoma	Big Eight	15–12	6th	1992
Old Dominion	CAA	20–9	8th	1993
Siena	MAAC	21–7	3rd	1991
Southern Miss	Metro	15–14	5th	1988
Stanford	Pac-10	17–10	4th	1991
Texas A&M	SWC	19–10	5th	1986
Tulane	Metro	17–10	3rd	1983
UNC Charlotte	Metro	16–12	3rd	1989
USC	Pac-10	16–11	3rd	1993
Vanderbilt	SEC	16–11	5th	1982
Villanova	Big East	15–12	12th	1992
West Virginia	Atlantic 10	16–11	12th	1993
Xavier	Midwestern Collegiate	20–7	5th	1984

== Brackets ==
Below are the four first-round brackets, along with the four-team championship bracket.

First round
Clemson	96
Southern Miss	85
West Virginia	85
Davidson	69
Vanderbilt	77
Oklahoma	67
New Orleans	79
Texas A&M	73

Second round
Clemson	96
West Virginia	79
Vanderbilt	78
New Orleans	59

Quarterfinals
Clemson	74
Vanderbilt	89

First round
Kansas State	78
Mississippi State	69
Gonzaga	80
Stanford	76
Fresno State	79
USC	76
BYU	74
Arizona State	67

Second round
Kansas State	66
Gonzaga	64
Fresno State	68
BYU	66

Quarterfinals
Kansas State	115
Fresno State	77

First round
Villanova	103
Canisius	79
Duquesne	75
UNC Charlotte	73
Northwestern	69
DePaul	68
Xavier	80
Miami (OH)	68

Second round
Villanova	82
Duquesne	66
Northwestern	79
Xavier	83 OT

Quarterfinals
Villanova	76
Xavier	74

First round
Bradley	66
Murray State	58
Old Dominion	76
Manhattan	74
Tulane	76
Evansville	63
Siena	76
Georgia Tech	68

Second round
Bradley	79
Old Dominion	75
Tulane	79
Siena	89

Quarterfinals
Bradley	62
Siena	75

=== Semifinals & finals ===
Semifinals
Vanderbilt	82
Kansas State	76
Villanova	66
Siena	58

Finals
Vanderbilt	73
Villanova	80

Third place game
Kansas State	79
Siena	92

== See also ==
- 1994 NCAA Division I men's basketball tournament
- 1994 NCAA Division II men's basketball tournament
- 1994 NCAA Division III men's basketball tournament
- 1994 NCAA Division I women's basketball tournament
- 1994 NCAA Division II women's basketball tournament
- 1994 NCAA Division III women's basketball tournament
- 1994 NAIA Division I men's basketball tournament
- 1994 NAIA Division II men's basketball tournament
- 1994 NAIA Division I women's basketball tournament
