= Gulf South Conference women's basketball tournament =

- Conference basketball championship
- Sport: Basketball
- Conference: Gulf South Conference
- Number of teams: 8
- Format: Single-elimination tournament
- Played: 1983–1989, 1992–present
- Current champion: Union (TN) (8th)
- Most championships: Delta State (16)
- Official website: GSC women's basketball

Host stadiums
- Pete Hanna Center (2013–2020); DeSoto Civic Center (2007–2011); BancorpSouth Center (2001–2006); Campus venues (1983–1989, 1992–1999, 2021)

Host locations
- Homewood, Alabama (2013–2020); Southaven, Mississippi (2007–2011); Tupelo, Mississippi (2001–2006); Campus sites (1983–1989, 1992–1999, 2021)

The Gulf South Conference women's basketball tournament is the annual conference women's basketball championship tournament for the Gulf South Conference. The tournament has been held annually since 1983, except for a two-year hiatus during 1990 and 1991. It is a single-elimination tournament and seeding is based on regular season records.

The winner receives the Gulf South's automatic bid to the NCAA Division II women's basketball tournament.

== Results ==
Year	Champions	Score	Runner-up	Venue
1983	Valdosta State	85–83	Delta State	Walter Sillers Coliseum (Cleveland, MS)
1984	Valdosta State	71–70	North Alabama	Flowers Hall (Florence, AL)
1985	North Alabama	67–66	Valdosta State	PE Complex (Valdosta, GA)
1986	Delta State	87–69	Valdosta State	Walter Sillers Coliseum (Cleveland, MS)
1987	Delta State	93–53	Livingston	Walter Sillers Coliseum (Cleveland, MS)
1988	Delta State	98–69	Jacksonville State	Walter Sillers Coliseum (Cleveland, MS)
1989	Delta State	77–72 (2OT)	West Georgia	Walter Sillers Coliseum (Cleveland, MS)
1990	Tournament not held			
1991	Tournament not held			
1992	West Georgia	64–52	Delta State	Walter Sillers Coliseum (Cleveland, MS)
1993	Jacksonville State	67–65	Delta State	Walter Sillers Coliseum (Cleveland, MS)
1994	West Georgia	78–70	Lincoln Memorial	Flowers Hall (Florence, AL)
1995	Delta State	86–64	Mississippi College	Walter Sillers Coliseum (Cleveland, MS)
1996	Delta State	86–68	Central Arkansas	PE Complex (Valdosta, GA)
1997	Delta State	76–53	Valdosta State	Walter Sillers Coliseum (Cleveland, MS)
1998	Arkansas Tech	70–64	West Florida	UWF Field House (Pensacola, FL)
1999	Delta State	63–59	Arkansas Tech	Walter Sillers Coliseum (Cleveland, MS)
2000	Delta State	70–66	Arkansas Tech	Flowers Hall (Florence, AL)
2001	Delta State	60–52	Arkansas Tech	BancorpSouth Center (Tupelo, MS)
2002	Delta State	53–47	Arkansas Tech	BancorpSouth Center (Tupelo, MS)
2003	Arkansas Tech	56–43	Central Arkansas	BancorpSouth Center (Tupelo, MS)
2004	Henderson State	53–52 (OT)	Delta State	BancorpSouth Center (Tupelo, MS)
2005	Central Arkansas	66–65	Valdosta State	BancorpSouth Center (Tupelo, MS)
2006	Delta State	64–53	Henderson State	BancorpSouth Center (Tupelo, MS)
2007	Delta State	64–53	Henderson State	DeSoto Civic Center (Southaven, MS)
2008	Delta State	80–61	Arkansas Tech	DeSoto Civic Center (Southaven, MS)
2009	Delta State	53–51	Arkansas–Monticello	DeSoto Civic Center (Southaven, MS)
2010	Arkansas Tech	75–73 (2OT)	Delta State	DeSoto Civic Center (Southaven, MS)
2011	Arkansas Tech	73–62	Delta State	DeSoto Civic Center (Southaven, MS)
2012	West Alabama	86–74	Alabama–Huntsville	Landers Center (Southaven, MS)
2013	Alabama–Huntsville	82–59	West Alabama	Pete Hanna Center (Homewood, AL)
2014	West Florida	67–59	Delta State	Pete Hanna Center (Homewood, AL)
2015	Union (TN)	62–50	Delta State	Pete Hanna Center (Homewood, AL)
2016	Delta State	69–63 (OT)	Union (TN)	Pete Hanna Center (Homewood, AL)
2017	Valdosta State	91–79 (OT)	West Florida	Pete Hanna Center (Homewood, AL)
2018	Union (TN)	66–54	West Florida	Pete Hanna Center (Homewood, AL)
2019	Lee	81–73	Valdosta State	Pete Hanna Center (Homewood, AL)
2020	Union (TN)	69–67	Delta State	Pete Hanna Center (Homewood, AL)
2021	Union (TN)	70–56	Lee	AUM Basketball Complex (Montgomery, AL)
2022	Union (TN)	58–44	Lee	Pete Hanna Center (Homewood, AL)
2023	Union (TN)	76–68	Lee	Pete Hanna Center (Homewood, AL)
2024	West Georgia	75–69	Alabama–Huntsville	Pete Hanna Center (Homewood, AL)
2025	Union (TN)	58–52	Alabama–Huntsville	Pete Hanna Center (Homewood, AL)
2026	Union (TN)	65–63	Alabama–Huntsville	Huntsville, AL

== Championship records ==
School	Finals record	Finals appearances	Years
Delta State	16–9	25	1986, 1987, 1988, 1989, 1995, 1996, 1997, 1999, 2000, 2001, 2002, 2006, 2007, 2008, 2009, 2016
Union (TN)	8–1	9	2015, 2018, 2020, 2021, 2022, 2023, 2025, 2026
Arkansas Tech	4–5	9	1998, 2003, 2010, 2011
Valdosta State	3–5	8	1983, 1984, 2017
West Georgia	3–1	4	1992, 1994, 2024
Alabama–Huntsville	1–4	5	2013
Lee	1–3	4	2019
West Florida	1–3	4	2014
West Alabama (Livingston)	1–2	3	2012
Central Arkansas	1–2	3	2005
Henderson State	1–2	3	2004
Jacksonville State	1–1	2	1993
North Alabama	1–1	2	1985
Mississippi College	0–1	1	
Arkansas–Monticello	0–1	1	
Lincoln Memorial	0–1	1	

- Auburn–Montgomery, Christian Brothers, Montevallo, and Trevecca Nazarene have not yet qualified for the tournament finals.
- Harding, Mississippi Women, Ouachita Baptist, Shorter, Southern Arkansas, Tennessee–Martin, and Troy never reached the tournament finals before departing the Gulf South.
- Schools highlighted in pink are former members of the Gulf South Conference.

== See also ==
- Gulf South Conference men's basketball tournament
- NCAA Division II women's basketball tournament
