= 1993–94 Clemson Tigers women's basketball team =

Women's college basketball season

1993–94 Clemson Tigers women's basketball

NCAA Tournament, Second Round
- Conference: Atlantic Coast Conference

Ranking
- Coaches: No. 22
- Record: 20–10 (11–5 ACC)
- Head coach: Jim Davis (7th season)
- Home arena: Littlejohn Coliseum

1993–94 ACC women's basketball standings
	Conf.				Overall
Team	W		L	PCT	W		L	PCT
No. 8 Virginia	15	–	1	.938	27	–	5	.844
No. 4 North Carolina †	14	–	2	.875	33	–	2	.943
No. 22 Clemson	11	–	5	.688	20	–	10	.667
Maryland	8	–	8	.500	15	–	13	.536
Duke	7	–	9	.438	16	–	11	.593
NC State	6	–	10	.375	13	–	14	.481
Georgia Tech	5	–	11	.313	12	–	15	.444
Wake Forest	3	–	13	.188	8	–	19	.296
Florida State	3	–	13	.188	6	–	21	.222
† 1994 ACC tournament winner Rankings from AP poll

The 1993–94 Clemson Tigers women's basketball team represented Clemson University during the 1993–94 NCAA Division I women's basketball season. The Tigers were led by seventh year head coach Jim Davis. The Tigers, members of the Atlantic Coast Conference, played their home games at Littlejohn Coliseum.

== Schedule ==
Date time, TV	Rank^{#}	Opponent^{#}	Result	Record	Site city, state
December 1, 1993*		Furman	W 78–77	1–0	Littlejohn Coliseum; Clemson, South Carolina
December 4, 1993*		Western Carolina	W 88–45	2–0	Littlejohn Coliseum; Clemson, South Carolina
December 11, 1993*		Coppin State	W 92–30	3–0	Littlejohn Coliseum; Clemson, South Carolina
December 15, 1993*		at South Carolina State	L 61–74	3–1	SHM Memorial Center; Orangeburg, South Carolina
December 21, 1993*		at UNLV; UNLV Tournament	L 61–72	3–2	Thomas & Mack Center; Paradise, Nevada
December 22, 1993*		vs. Louisville; UNLV Tournament	W 62–53	4–2	Thomas & Mack Center; Paradise, Nevada
December 29, 1993*		vs. Ohio; Hilton Head Tournament	W 76–48	5–2	Hilton Head, South Carolina
December 30, 1993*		vs. No. 3 Penn State; Hilton Head Tournament	L 75–85	5–3	Hilton Head, South Carolina
January 3, 1994		at No. 17 Virginia	L 65–69	5–4 (0–1)	University Hall; Charlottesville, Virginia
January 5, 1994		at NC State	W 71–56	6–4 (1–1)	Reynolds Coliseum; Raleigh, North Carolina
January 8, 1994		No. 24 Maryland	W 54–52	7–4 (2–1)	Littlejohn Coliseum; Clemson, South Carolina
January 13, 1994		Wake Forest	W 72–54	8–4 (3–1)	Littlejohn Coliseum; Clemson, South Carolina
January 18, 1994*		Winthrop	W 83–34	9–4 (3–1)	Littlejohn Coliseum; Clemson, South Carolina
January 23, 1994		Duke	L 67–74	9–5 (3–2)	Littlejohn Coliseum; Clemson, South Carolina
January 26, 1994		Georgia Tech	W 77–52	10–5 (4–2)	Littlejohn Coliseum; Clemson, South Carolina
January 28, 1994		at Duke	W 90–82	11–5 (5–2)	Cameron Indoor Stadium; Durham, North Carolina
January 30, 1994		at No. 5 North Carolina	L 68–71	11–6 (5–3)	Carmichael Arena; Chapel Hill, North Carolina
February 3, 1994		NC State	W 71–59	12–6 (6–3)	Littlejohn Coliseum; Clemson, South Carolina
February 7, 1994		Florida State	W 80–26	13–6 (7–3)	Littlejohn Coliseum; Clemson, South Carolina
February 9, 1994		at Wake Forest	W 65–48	14–6 (8–3)	LJVM Coliseum; Winston-Salem, North Carolina
February 16, 1994*		South Carolina rivalry	W 90–75	15–6 (8–3)	Littlejohn Coliseum; Clemson, South Carolina
February 19, 1994		No. 6 Virginia	W 70–61	16–6 (9–3)	Littlejohn Coliseum; Clemson, South Carolina
February 23, 1994		at Florida State	W 75–60	17–6 (10–3)	Tallahassee–Leon County Civic Center; Tallahassee, Florida
February 25, 1994		at Georgia Tech	W 55–51	18–6 (11–3)	Alexander Memorial Coliseum; Atlanta, Georgia
February 27, 1994		No. 5 North Carolina	L 86–91	18–7 (11–4)	Littlejohn Coliseum; Clemson, South Carolina
March 1, 1994		at Maryland	L 46–84	18–8 (11–5)	Cole Field House; College Park, Maryland
ACC Tournament
March 5, 1994*		vs. NC State; ACC Tournament quarterfinal	W 73–52	19–8 (11–5)	Winthrop Coliseum; Rock Hill, South Carolina
March 6, 1994*		vs. No. 5 North Carolina; ACC Tournament quarterfinal	L 64–65	19–9 (11–5)	Winthrop Coliseum; Rock Hill, South Carolina
NCAA Tournament
March 16, 1994*		at No. 19 Florida International; NCAA Tournament first round	W 65–64	20–9 (11–5)	Golden Panther Arena; Miami, Florida
March 19, 1994*		at No. 1 Tennessee; NCAA Tournament second	L 66–78	20–10 (11–5)	Thompson–Boling Arena; Knoxville, Tennessee
*Non-conference game. ^{#}Rankings from AP Poll. (#) Tournament seedings in parentheses.
