= 1993–94 NCAA Division I women's basketball rankings =

- Season: 1993–94
- NCAA Tournament: 1994
- Preseason No. 1: Tennessee
- NCAA Tournament Champions: North Carolina
NCAA Division I women's basketball rankings


Two human polls comprise the 1993–94 NCAA Division I women's basketball rankings, the AP Poll and the Coaches Poll, in addition to various publications' preseason polls. The AP poll is currently a poll of sportswriters, while the USA Today Coaches' Poll is a poll of college coaches. The AP conducts polls weekly through the end of the regular season and conference play, while the Coaches poll conducts a final, post-NCAA tournament poll as well.

== Legend ==
–	No votes
(#)	Ranking

== AP Poll ==
Team	16-Nov	7-Dec	14-Dec	21-Dec	28-Dec	4-Jan	11-Jan	18-Jan	25-Jan	1-Feb	8-Feb	15-Feb	22-Feb	1-Mar	8-Mar
Tennessee	1	1	1	1	1	1	1	1	2	2	2	1	1	1	1
Colorado	11	9	7	6	5	4	7	6	3	7	5	3	3	3	2
UConn	18	15	6	4	4	8	12	11	11	9	6	4	4	4	3
Penn St.	7	6	4	3	3	3	3	3	1	1	1	2	2	2	4
North Carolina	8	7	5	5	6	5	4	7	5	3	3	5	5	5	5
Texas Tech	3	3	3	7	7	6	5	4	6	4	7	8	7	6	6
Louisiana Tech	6	5	10	10	14	14	14	14	14	13	13	12	8	7	7
Virginia	10	8	14	13	13	17	15	12	12	10	9	6	9	8	8
Southern California	13	12	11	9	9	10	9	9	8	5	4	7	6	9	9
Purdue	23	22	18	16	17	16	13	13	13	12	11	9	10	10	10
Stanford	9	11	13	11	11	9	11	10	10	14	14	13	11	11	11
Vanderbilt	5	10	9	8	8	7	6	5	9	11	12	14	13	13	12
Iowa	2	2	2	2	2	2	2	2	4	8	8	11	14	14	13
Seton Hall	–	–	–	–	–	–	25	24	22	18	18	16	15	15	14
Kansas	15	14	15	17	16	12	8	8	7	6	10	10	12	12	15
Alabama	19	16	12	12	10	11	10	15	15	15	20	17	16	16	16
Washington	–	–	–	–	–	22	16	16	18	17	15	15	20	19	17
Boise St.	–	–	–	–	–	–	23	22	21	21	21	19	17	20	18
Southern Miss.	–	–	–	–	–	–	–	–	–	24	–	24	19	18	19
Montana	–	–	–	–	25	20	22	21	20	23	22	21	18	17	20
FIU	–	–	–	–	–	–	19	17	16	16	16	18	21	21	21
Florida	–	–	–	–	–	–	–	–	–	–	–	–	22	22	22
Ole Miss	22	–	–	–	–	–	–	–	–	–	–	–	24	24	23
Hawaii	–	–	23	21	23	21	–	–	–	–	–	–	–	–	24
Bowling Green	–	–	–	–	–	–	–	–	–	–	–	–	–	–	25
Auburn	4	4	8	15	18	19	21	23	23	20	19	22	–	25	–
George Washington	21	18	21	22	22	23	–	–	–	–	–	–	–	–	–
Georgia	17	21	25	25	24	25	–	–	–	–	–	–	–	–	–
Maryland	24	23	20	20	20	24	–	–	–	–	–	–	–	–	–
Missouri St.	20	17	17	18	21	–	–	–	–	–	–	–	–	–	–
Northwestern	–	–	24	23	19	18	18	19	19	–	–	–	–	–	–
Ohio St.	14	13	16	14	12	15	17	18	17	22	–	–	–	–	–
Oklahoma St.	25	25	22	24	–	–	–	–	–	–	–	–	–	–	–
Rutgers	–	–	–	–	–	–	–	–	25	19	17	20	25	–	–
Stephen F. Austin	16	19	–	–	–	–	–	–	–	–	–	–	–	–	–
Texas A&M	–	–	–	–	–	–	–	–	–	–	25	–	–	–	–
Toledo	–	–	–	–	–	–	–	–	–	–	23	25	–	–	–
UCLA	–	24	–	–	–	–	–	–	–	–	–	–	–	–	–
UNLV	–	–	–	–	–	–	24	25	–	–	–	–	–	–	–
Western Ky.	12	20	19	19	15	13	20	20	24	25	24	23	23	23	–

== USA Today Coaches poll ==
Team	PS	23-Nov	30-Nov	7-Dec	14-Dec	21-Dec	28-Dec	4-Jan	11-Jan	18-Jan	25-Jan	1-Feb	8-Feb	15-Feb	22-Feb	1-Mar	8-Mar	4-Apr
North Carolina	10	9	9	7	6	5	5	5	4	7	5	3	3	5	5	6	5	1
Louisiana Tech	4	3	5	6	10	T10	15	15	14	13	14	12	13	11	9	8	8	2
Purdue	24	23	22	19	18	15	16	14	13	14	13	13	10	9	11	10	11	3
Alabama	20	20	19	16	11	T10	10	11	10	15	15	15	20	17	16	15	16	4
Tennessee	1	1	1	1	1	1	1	1	1	1	2	2	2	1	1	1	1	5
Penn St.	7	7	7	5	4	3	3	3	3	3	1	1	1	2	2	2	4	6
UConn	19	19	18	15	5	4	4	8	11	12	11	9	6	6	4	4	3	7
Stanford	6	5	8	11	13	12	11	9	12	10	10	14	14	13	10	9	10	8
Southern California	11	11	13	12	12	9	9	10	9	8	8	5	4	8	6	11	9	9
Colorado	13	14	12	10	7	6	6	4	7	6	4	8	5	3	3	3	2	10
Texas Tech	16	6	3	3	3	7	7	6	6	4	6	4	8	7	7	5	6	11
Virginia	9	10	10	8	14	14	13	17	15	11	12	11	9	4	8	7	7	12
Vanderbilt	2	8	6	9	9	8	8	7	5	5	9	10	11	14	12	13	12	13
Seton Hall	–	–	–	–	–	–	–	–	–	23	21	18	19	16	15	16	14	14
Iowa	3	2	2	2	2	2	2	2	2	2	3	7	7	12	14	14	13	15
Southern Miss.	–	–	–	–	–	–	–	–	–	–	–	–	24	25	19	18	18	16
Kansas	17	16	16	14	16	17	14	12	8	9	7	6	12	10	13	12	15	17
Montana	–	–	–	–	–	–	25	20	22	21	20	24	22	22	18	17	21	18
Texas A&M	–	–	–	–	–	–	–	–	–	–	–	–	–	–	–	–	–	19
Ole Miss	23	22	23	25	–	–	24	–	–	–	–	–	25	24	22	22	23	20
Washington	–	–	–	–	–	–	–	25	16	17	19	17	16	15	20	19	17	21
Clemson	–	–	–	–	–	–	–	–	–	–	–	–	–	–	–	–	–	22
Texas	25	–	–	–	–	–	–	–	–	–	–	–	–	–	–	–	–	23
Florida Int’l	–	–	–	–	–	–	–	–	19	16	16	16	15	19	21	20	20	24
Florida	–	–	–	–	–	–	–	–	–	–	–	–	–	–	25	23	22	25
Auburn	5	4	4	4	8	16	19	19	20	22	22	20	18	21	–	25	–	–
Boise St.	–	–	–	–	–	–	–	–	25	25	23	23	21	20	17	21	19	–
George Washington	22	21	21	18	23	25	–	24	–	–	–	–	–	–	–	–	–	–
Georgia	5	17	17	21	21	24	21	23	23	–	–	–	–	–	–	–	–	–
Hawaii	–	–	–	–	25	21	22	21	–	–	–	–	–	–	–	–	–	–
Indiana	–	–	–	–	–	–	–	–	–	–	–	T25	–	–	–	–	–	–
Maryland	21	24	24	23	20	20	20	22	–	–	–	–	–	–	–	–	–	–
Missouri St.	18	18	20	17	17	18	23	–	–	–	–	–	–	–	–	–	–	–
Northern Ill.	–	–	–	–	–	–	–	–	–	–	–	T25	–	–	–	–	–	–
Northwestern	–	–	–	–	–	23	18	18	18	20	18	–	–	–	–	–	–	–
Ohio St.	8	15	14	13	15	13	12	13	17	18	17	22	–	–	–	–	–	–
Oklahoma St.	–	25	25	24	24	22	–	–	–	–	–	–	–	–	–	–	–	–
Oregon	–	–	–	–	–	–	–	–	–	–	–	–	–	–	–	–	24	–
Rutgers	–	–	–	–	–	–	–	–	–	–	24	19	17	18	23	–	–	–
Stephen F. Austin	14	13	15	20	22	–	–	–	–	–	–	–	–	–	–	–	–	–
UNLV	–	–	–	–	–	–	–	–	24	24	–	–	–	–	–	–	–	–
Western Ky.	12	12	11	22	19	19	17	16	21	19	25	21	23	23	24	24	25	–
