= Cissokho =

Cissokho, also spelled Sissokho, is a surname. Notable people with the surname include:

== Cissokho ==
- Aly Cissokho (born 1987), French footballer
- Boubacar Cissokho (born 1994), Senegalese footballer
- Cheikh Abdoul Khadre Cissokho (born 1936), Senegalese politician and engineer
- Frédéric Cissokho (born 1971), French footballer
- Issa Cissokho (1946–2019), Senegalese musician
- Issa Cissokho (footballer) (born 1985), Senegalese footballer
- Kalidou Cissokho (born 1978), Senegalese footballer
- Ousmane Cissokho (born 1987), Senegalese footballer
- Seydou Cissokho (1929–1986), Senegalese politician
- Solo Cissokho (1963–2019), Norwegian–Senegalese musician
- Souleymane Cissokho (born 1991), Senegalese-born French boxer
- Till Cissokho (born 2000), French footballer
- Yaya Cissokho (born 1957), Senegalese basketball player

== Sissokho ==
- Issouf Sissokho (born 2002), Malian footballer
- Youba Sissokho (born 1991), Senegalese-born Spanish boxer
- Zal Sissokho, Senegalese-Canadian musician

== See also ==
- Cissoko
- Sissako
- Sissoko
