= 1993–94 Alabama Crimson Tide women's basketball team =

Intercollegiate basketball season

1993–94 Alabama Crimson Tide women's basketball

NCAA tournament, Final Four
- Conference: Southeastern Conference
- Record: 26–7 (7–4 SEC)
- Head coach: Rick Moody (5th season)
- Home arena: Coleman Coliseum

1993–94 SEC women's basketball standings
	Conf.				Overall
Team	W		L	PCT	W		L	PCT
No. 1 Tennessee^{†}	11	–	0	1.000	31	–	2	.939
No. 12 Vanderbilt	9	–	2	.818	25	–	8	.758
No. 22 Florida	8	–	3	.727	22	–	7	.759
No. 16 Alabama	7	–	4	.636	26	–	7	.788
No. 23 Ole Miss	7	–	4	.636	24	–	9	.727
Auburn	6	–	5	.545	20	–	10	.667
Kentucky	5	–	6	.455	17	–	11	.607
Georgia	5	–	6	.455	17	–	11	.607
Arkansas	3	–	8	.273	15	–	14	.517
South Carolina	2	–	9	.182	14	–	13	.519
LSU	2	–	9	.182	11	–	16	.407
Mississippi State	1	–	10	.091	8	–	18	.308
† 1994 SEC tournament winner Rankings from AP poll

The 1993–94 Alabama Crimson Tide women's basketball team represented the University of Alabama as a member of the Southeastern Conference during the 1993–94 college basketball season. The Crimson Tide, led by fifth-year head coach Rick Moody, played their games at Foster Auditorium. The team finished the season with a 26–7 record (7–4 SEC) and reached the Final Four for the first, and only, time in program history.

== Roster ==
No Name Pos CL HT Hometown

02 Monique Walls G/F JR 5-8 Richmond, Indiana

04 Consuelo Daniels F JR 6-1 Rome, Georgia

10 Aycan Yeniley G SO 5-7 Istanbul, Turkey

12 Madonna Thompson G JR 5-7 Collinwood, Tennessee

15 Sharrona Alexander F SR 5-10 Murfreesboro, Tennessee

20 Niesa Johnson G JR 5-9 Clinton, Mississippi

21 Betsy Harris G SR 5-10 Decatur, Mississippi

22 Sarah Smith F/C SO 6-1 Montevallo, Alabama

23 Camillia Crenshaw G SR 5-8 Fayette, Alabama

24 Carla Koonce F JR 5-9 Dothan, Alabama

30 Shondra Fuller F SO 6-0 Decatur, Alabama

31 Marlene Stevenson F JR 6-0 Prichard, Alabama

32 Leah Monteith G FR 5-9 Centre, Alabama

54 Yolanda Watkins F/C SO 6-2 Decatur, Alabama

== Schedule ==
Date time, TV	Rank^{#}	Opponent^{#}	Result	Record	Site (attendance) city, state
Regular season
SEC tournament
Mar 5, 1994*	(4) No. 16	vs. (5) No. 23 Ole Miss; Quarterfinals	W 86–84 ^{OT}	22–5	McKenzie Arena; Chattanooga, Tennessee
Mar 6, 1994*	(4) No. 16	vs. (1) No. 1 Tennessee; Semifinals	L 56–72	22–6	McKenzie Arena; Chattanooga, Tennessee
NCAA tournament
Mar 18, 1994*	(6 MW) No. 16	vs. (11 MW) Oregon State; First round	W 96–86	23–6	Carver–Hawkeye Arena; Iowa City, Iowa
Mar 20, 1994*	(6 MW) No. 16	at (3 MW) No. 13 Iowa; Second round	W 84–78	24–6	Carver–Hawkeye Arena; Iowa City, Iowa
Mar 24, 1994*	(6 MW) No. 16	vs. (2 MW) No. 6 Texas Tech; Regional Semifinal – Sweet Sixteen	W 73–68	25–6	Frank Erwin Center; Austin, Texas
Mar 26, 1994*	(6 MW) No. 16	vs. (1 MW) No. 4 Penn State; Regional Final – Elite Eight	W 96–82	26–6	Frank Erwin Center; Austin, Texas
Apr 1, 1994*	(6 MW) No. 16	vs. (4 ME) No. 7 Louisiana Tech; National Semifinal – Final Four	L 66–69	26–7	Richmond Coliseum; Richmond, Virginia
*Non-conference game. ^{#}Rankings from AP Poll. (#) Tournament seedings in parentheses. All times are in Central Time.

== See also ==
1993–94 Alabama Crimson Tide men's basketball team
