= Sissoko =

Sissoko is a surname, and may refer to:

- Abdoul Sissoko, French-Malian footballer
- Awa Sissoko, French basketball player
- Baba Sissoko, Malian musician
- Ballaké Sissoko, Malian musician
- Banzumana Sissoko, Malian musician
- Bouaré Fily Sissoko, Malian politician
- Cheick Oumar Sissoko, Malian film director
- Django Sissoko, Malian politician and civil servant
- Djenebou Sissoko, Malian women's basketball player
- Fily Dabo Sissoko, Malian politician
- Foutanga Babani Sissoko, Malian fraudster and politician
- Habib Sissoko, French-Malian footballer
- Ibrahim Sissoko, Ivorian footballer
- Inna Sissoko Cissé, Malian stateswoman
- Kadi Sissoko (born 1999), French basketball player
- Kamal Issah Sissoko, Ghanaian footballer
- Mady Sissoko (born 2000), Malian basketball player
- Mah Sissoko, Malian musician
- Mohamed Sissoko, Malian footballer
- Moussa Sissoko, French footballer
- Mohamadou Sissoko, French footballer
- Noé Sissoko, Malian footballer
- Oumar Sissoko, Malian footballer

== See also ==
- Cissokho
- Cissoko
- Sissako
