= Jacksonville State Gamecocks basketball =

Jacksonville State Gamecocks basketball may refer to either of the basketball teams that represent Jacksonville State University:

- Jacksonville State Gamecocks men's basketball
- Jacksonville State Gamecocks women's basketball
