= Sissako =

Sissako is a surname. Notable persons with the surname include:

- Abderrahmane Sissako (born 1961), Mauritanian-born Malian film director and producer
- Abdoulaye Sissako (born 1998), French footballer
- Mamadou Sissako (born 1996), French footballer
- Moussa Sissako (born 2000), French footballer

== See also ==
- Cissokho
- Cissoko
- Sissoko
