= 1993–94 Louisiana Tech Lady Techsters basketball team =

1993-94 Louisiana Tech women's basketball season

1993–94 Louisiana Tech Lady Techsters basketball

NCAA tournament, Runner-Up
- Conference: Sun Belt Conference

Ranking
- Coaches: No. 2
- AP: No. 7
- Record: 31–4 (14–0 Sun Belt Conference)
- Head coach: Leon Barmore (12th season)
- Assistant coaches: Kim Mulkey; Nell Fortner
- Home arena: Thomas Assembly Center

1993–94 Sun Belt Conference women's basketball standings
	Conf.				Overall
Team	W		L	PCT	W		L	PCT
No. 7 Louisiana Tech †	14	–	0	1.000	31	–	4	.886
Western Kentucky	11	–	3	.786	24	–	10	.706
Arkansas State	10	–	4	.714	22	–	9	.710
New Orleans	8	–	6	.571	16	–	12	.571
Lamar	5	–	9	.357	8	–	19	.296
Louisiana	4	–	10	.286	6	–	21	.222
South Alabama	3	–	11	.214	5	–	22	.185
Texas-Rio Grande Valley	1	–	13	.071	4	–	23	.148
† 1994 Sun Belt tournament winner

The 1993–94 Louisiana Tech Lady Techsters basketball team represented Louisiana Tech University during the 1993–94 NCAA Division I women's basketball season. The team was led by head coach Leon Barmore, who guided the team to a 31–4 record and a runner-up finish at the 1994 NCAA tournament. This was the program's fifth appearance in the NCAA championship game, and first since winning the National championship in 1988. The team played their home games at the Thomas Assembly Center in Ruston, Louisiana as a member of the Sun Belt Conference.

== Roster ==
1993–94 Louisiana Tech Lady Techsters women's basketball team
Players
Coaches

Pos.	#	Name	Height	Year	Hometown
G	25	Debra Williams	5 ft 8 in (1.73 m)	So
G	55	Vickie Johnson	5 ft 9 in (1.75 m)	Fr	Coushatta, Louisiana

Head coach

- Leon Barmore

Assistant coach(es)

- Kim Mulkey

Legend

- (C) Team captain
- (S) Suspended
- (I) Ineligible
- (W) Walk-on
- Injured
- Current redshirt

== Schedule and results ==
Date time, TV	Rank^{#}	Opponent^{#}	Result	Record	Site (attendance) city, state
Regular season
Sun Belt tournament
NCAA tournament
Mar 24, 1994*	(4 ME) No. 7	vs. (1 ME) No. 1 Tennessee; Regional Semifinal – Sweet Sixteen	W 71–68	29–3	Bud Walton Arena; Fayetteville, Arkansas
Mar 26, 1994*	(4 ME) No. 7	vs. (2 ME) No. 3 USC; Regional Final – Elite Eight	W 75–66	30–3	Bud Walton Arena; Fayetteville, Arkansas
Apr 1, 1994*	(4 ME) No. 7	vs. (6 MW) No. 4 Alabama; National Semifinal – Final Four	W 69–66	31–3	Richmond Coliseum; Richmond, Virginia
Apr 3, 1994*	(4 ME) No. 7	vs. (3 E) No. 5 North Carolina; National Championship	L 59–60	31–4	Richmond Coliseum; Richmond, Virginia
*Non-conference game. ^{#}Rankings from AP Poll. (#) Tournament seedings in parentheses. MW=Midwest. All times are in Central.
