= 1993–94 North Carolina Tar Heels women's basketball team =

Intercollegiate basketball season

1993–94 North Carolina Tar Heels women's basketball

NCAA Tournament National champions ACC Regular season & Tournament champions
- Conference: Atlantic Coast Conference

Ranking
- Coaches: No. 1
- AP: No. 4
- Record: 33–2 (14–2 ACC)
- Head coach: Sylvia Hatchell (8th season)
- Home arena: Carmichael Auditorium

1993–94 ACC women's basketball standings
	Conf.				Overall
Team	W		L	PCT	W		L	PCT
No. 8 Virginia	15	–	1	.938	27	–	5	.844
No. 4 North Carolina †	14	–	2	.875	33	–	2	.943
No. 22 Clemson	11	–	5	.688	20	–	10	.667
Maryland	8	–	8	.500	15	–	13	.536
Duke	7	–	9	.438	16	–	11	.593
NC State	6	–	10	.375	13	–	14	.481
Georgia Tech	5	–	11	.313	12	–	15	.444
Wake Forest	3	–	13	.188	8	–	19	.296
Florida State	3	–	13	.188	6	–	21	.222
† 1994 ACC tournament winner Rankings from AP poll

The 1993–94 North Carolina Tar Heels women's basketball team represented the University of North Carolina in NCAA basketball, and won their first NCAA championship. Marion Jones, a 5'11" forward and an All-American in track and field, played for the 1993-94 Tar Heels team. The Tar Heels finished with a record of 33–2.

== Roster ==
1993–94 North Carolina Tar Heels women's basketball team
Players
Coaches

Pos.	#	Name	Height	Year	Hometown
C	00	Sylvia Crawley	—	Sr	Steubenville, Ohio
F	20	Marion Jones	5 ft 10 in (1.78 m)	Fr	Los Angeles, California
G	23	Charlotte Smith	6 ft 0 in (1.83 m)	Jr	Shelby, North Carolina
	33	Lori Gear	—	So

Head coach

- Sylvia Hatchell

Assistant coach(es)

Legend

- (C) Team captain
- (S) Suspended
- (I) Ineligible
- (W) Walk-on
- Injured
- Current redshirt

== Schedule ==
Date time, TV	Rank^{#}	Opponent^{#}	Result	Record	Site city, state
Regular season
Jan 12, 1994	No. 4	No. 15 Virginia	L 75–77	11–1 (1–1)	Carmichael Auditorium; Chapel Hill, North Carolina
Jan 16, 1994	No. 4	Georgia Tech	W 87–51	12–1 (2–1)	Carmichael Auditorium; Chapel Hill, North Carolina
Jan 30, 1994	No. 5	Clemson	W 71–68	17–1 (8–1)	Carmichael Auditorium; Chapel Hill, North Carolina
Feb 1, 1994*	No. 5	Winthrop	W 85–34	18–1	Carmichael Auditorium; Chapel Hill, North Carolina
Feb 22, 1994	No. 3	at No. 9 Virginia	L 74–83	19–2 (9–2)	University Hall; Charlottesville, Virginia
Feb 22, 1994	No. 5	Duke	W 70–58	23–2 (13–2)	Carmichael Auditorium; Chapel Hill, North Carolina
Feb 27, 1994	No. 5	at Clemson	W 91–86	24–2 (14–2)	Littlejohn Coliseum; Clemson, South Carolina
ACC tournament
Mar 5, 1994*	(2) No. 6	vs. (7) Georgia Tech; Quarterfinals	W 78–55	25–2	Winthrop Coliseum; Rock Hill, South Carolina
Mar 6, 1994*	(2) No. 6	vs. (3) Clemson; Semifinals	W 65–64	26–2	Winthrop Coliseum; Rock Hill, South Carolina
Mar 7, 1994*	(2) No. 6	vs. (1) No. 7 Virginia; Championship game	W 77–60	27–2	Winthrop Coliseum; Rock Hill, South Carolina
NCAA tournament
Mar 14, 1994*	(3 E) No. 5	(14 E) Georgia Southern; First round	W 101–53	28–2	Carmichael Auditorium; Chapel Hill, North Carolina
Mar 16, 1994*	(3 E) No. 5	(6 E) Old Dominion; Second round	W 63–52	29–2	Carmichael Auditorium; Chapel Hill, North Carolina
Mar 21, 1994*	(3 E) No. 5	vs. (2 E) No. 12 Vanderbilt; Regional Semifinal – Sweet Sixteen	W 73–69	30–2	Rutgers Athletic Center; Piscataway, New Jersey
Mar 23, 1994*	(3 E) No. 5	vs. (1 E) No. 3 Connecticut; Regional Final – Elite Eight	W 81–69	31–2	Rutgers Athletic Center; Piscataway, New Jersey
Apr 1, 1994*	(3 E) No. 5	vs. (1 W) No. 10 Purdue; National Semifinal – Final Four	W 89–74	32–2	Richmond Coliseum; Richmond, Virginia
Apr 3, 1994*	(3 E) No. 5	vs. (4 ME) No. 7 Louisiana Tech; National Championship	W 60–59	33–2	Richmond Coliseum; Richmond, Virginia
*Non-conference game. ^{#}Rankings from AP Poll. (#) Tournament seedings in parentheses.

=== NCAA championship ===
The Tar Heels qualified for the NCAA championship and played Louisiana Tech. During the first half of the game, Marion Jones was charged with three fouls and benched, although she returned to play in the second half. The Tar Heels won the game with a final score of 60-59 when Charlotte Smith nailed a three-pointer at the buzzer.

== Rankings ==
Ranking movements Legend: ██ Increase in ranking ██ Decrease in ranking
	Week																	
Poll	Pre	1	2	3	4	5	6	7	8	9	10	11	12	13	14	15	16	Final
AP	Not released	8	8	7	5	5	6	5	4	7	5	3	3	5	5	5	5	Not released
Coaches	10	9	9	7	6	5	5	5	4	7	5	3	3	5	5	6	5	1
