= Doremus Bennerman =

American basketball player (born 1972)

Personal information
- Born: May 7, 1972 (age 54) Bridgeport, Connecticut, U.S.
- Listed height: 5 ft 11 in (1.80 m)

Career information
- High school: St. Joseph (Trumbull, Connecticut)
- College: Siena (1990–1994)
- NBA draft: 1994: undrafted
- Playing career: 1994–2008
- Position: Point guard

Career history
- 1994: Connecticut Skyhawks
- 1995–1998: Jämtland Basket
- 1998: Tapiolan Honka
- 1998–1999: Ciudad de Huelva
- 1999–2002: Sundsvall Dragons
- 2002–2003: Irakleio
- 2003–2004: Lottomatica Roma
- 2004: Teramo
- 2004–2005: Olympia Larissa
- 2005–2006: Etosa Alicante
- 2006: Vertical Vision Cantu
- 2006: VidiVici Bologna
- 2007: Armani Jeans Milano
- 2007: Apollon Patras
- 2007–2008: Jämtland Basket

Career highlights
- Greek League All-Star (2003); SBL MVP (1996); MAAC Player of the Year (1994); 2× First-team All-MAAC (1993, 1994); NIT MVP (1994)

Doremus Tremayne Bennerman (born July 5, 1972) is an American former professional basketball player.

== College career ==
Bennerman played at Siena between 1990 and 1994. He is one of only two players in program history to score over 2,000 points (2,109). In the 1993–94 season, Doremus led the Saints to the semifinals of the National Invitational Tournament (NIT). In the third place game against Kansas State, Bennerman scored a school-record 51 points and made 27 of 30 free throw attempts. He scored 174 points in 5 NIT games and was selected as the tournament MVP. Bennerman's 174 points in the NIT remain a tournament record.

== Professional career ==
Doremus Bennerman started his professional career in Östersund and Jämtland Basket in 1995. He remained in Jämtland Basket until 1998 when he left for clubs in Finland and Spain. In 1999, he returned to Sweden and played for Sundsvall Dragons during three consecutive seasons. Between 2002 and 2007, he played for several clubs in Europe among other in Greece and Italy. For the 2007 campaign, Bennerman returned to Östersund and Jämtland Basket. Before the 2020/2021 season, Bennerman was appointed assistant coach at Jämtland Basket.
