= Cissoko =

Cissoko is a surname. Notable people with the surname include:

- Abdoulaye Cissoko (born 1999), French footballer
- Adji Cissoko, German ballet dancer
- Ablaye Cissoko (born 1970), Senegalese musician, singer and composer
- Hawa Cissoko (born 1997), French footballer
- Ibrahim Cissoko (born 2003), Dutch footballer
- Kerfala Cissoko (born 1999), Guinean footballer
- Makhan Bristol-Cissoko (born 2006), Seychelles footballer
- Sidy Cissoko (born 2004), French basketball player

== See also ==
- Ba Cissoko
- Cissokho
- Sissako
- Sissoko
