= Lipscomb Bisons women's basketball =

Lipscomb Bisons
| 2026–27 Lipscomb Bisons women's basketball team |
- University: Lipscomb University
- Head coach: Lauren Sumski (8th season)
- Location: Nashville, Tennessee
- Arena: Allen Arena (capacity: 5,028)
- Conference: Atlantic Sun
- Nickname: Bisons
- Colors: Purple and gold

NCAA Division I tournament appearances
- 2004

Conference tournament champions
- 2004

Conference regular-season champions
- 2004

Uniforms
| Home | Away | Alternate |

The Lipscomb Bisons women's basketball team is the women's basketball team that represents Lipscomb University in Nashville, Tennessee, United States. The school's team currently competes in the ASUN Conference.

== History ==
In 2004, Lipscomb finished in a four way tie for the regular season crown with Georgia Southern, Belmont, and UCF. In the conference tournament, they beat UCF 64–62 to win their first ever Atlantic Sun Conference tournament championship. They lost 76–45 to Vanderbilt in the First Round of the NCAA Tournament that year.

== Postseason results ==
=== NCAA Division I ===
| Year | Seed | Round | Opponent | Result |
|---|---|---|---|---|
| 2004 | #15 | First Round | #2 Vanderbilt | L 45–76 |

=== NAIA Division I ===
The Bisons made the NAIA Division I women's basketball tournament eight times, with a combined record of 13–8.

| Year | Seed | Round | Opponent | Result |
|---|---|---|---|---|
| 1990 | #7 | First Round | NR Wayland Baptist | L, 74–86 |
| 1993 | #6 | First Round; Second Round; Quarterfinals | NR Christ–Irvine #11 Campbellsville #3 SW Oklahoma State | W, 106–75; W, 76–70; L, 58–60 |
| 1994 | #7 | First Round; Second Round; Quarterfinals; Semifinals; National Championship | NR Lindenwood #10 Campbellsville #2 Arkansas Tech #6 Montevallo #1 Southern Nazarene | W, 89–59; W, 80–65; W, 85–67; W, 79–72; L, 74–97 |
| 1995 | #3 | First Round; Second Round; Quarterfinals; Semifinals | NR Clayton State #14 Oklahoma Christian #6 Arkansas–Monticello #7 SE Oklahoma State | W, 94–52; W, 80–67; W, 91–69; L, 74–75 |
| 1996 | #5 | First Round; Second Round; Quarterfinals; Semifinals | NR Lindenwood #12 Montana State Northern #4 Auburn Montgomery #1 SE Oklahoma State | W, 86–60; W, 87–67; W, 75–66; L, 75–84 |
| 1997 | #16 | First Round; Second Round | NR St. Mary's (TX) #1 Arkansas Tech | W, 86–72; L, 49–73 |
| 1998 | #15 | First Round | NR East Central (OK) | L, 72–78 |
| 1999 | #5 | First Round | NR Southern California College | L, 66–71 |
