= Betsy Harris =

American basketball coach and player (born 1972)

Personal information
- Born: April 2, 1972 (age 54) Jacksonville, Florida, U.S.
- Listed height: 178 cm (5 ft 10 in)

Career information
- High school: Decatur (Decatur, Mississippi )
- College: Alabama (1990–1994)
- Playing career: 1994–1999
- Position: Guard
- Coaching career: 1999–present

Career history

Playing
- 1995: Oviedo
- 1995–1996: Breiðablik

Coaching
- 1999–2001: West Alabama (assistant)
- 2001–2002: Troy (assistant)
- 2002–2003: East Central (assistant)
- 2003–2010: West Alabama (assistant)
- 2010–2011: Meridian (assistant)
- 2011–2014: Coastal Georgia
- 2014–2022: Florida Southern
- 2022–2024: East Central

Career highlights
- As player: Úrvalsdeild Foreign Player of the Year (1996); Icelandic Super Cup (1995); As coach: SSC champion (2018, 2019); WBCA South Region Coach of the Year (2019); 3× SSC Coach of the Year

Betsy Harris (born April 2, 1972) is an American basketball coach and former professional player. One of the first foreign professional women's players in Iceland, she was named the inaugural Úrvalsdeild Foreign Player of the Year in 1996.

== Early life ==
Harris was born in Jacksonville, Florida. She went to Decatur High School, in Decatur, Mississippi, where she won the state championship in 1990.

== College career ==
Harris played college basketball for the University of Alabama from 1990 to 1994. She led Alabama to three straight NCAA Tournament appearances and a trip the NCAA Division I Final Four in 1994. She earned Second-Team All-SEC honors as a senior in 1994 and was also named the MVP of the Midwest Regional and earned a spot on the 1994 Final Four All-Tournament Team.

=== Alabama statistics ===
Legend
GP	Games played	GS	Games started	MPG	Minutes per game
FG%	Field goal percentage	3P%	3-point field goal percentage	FT%	Free throw percentage
RPG	Rebounds per game	APG	Assists per game	SPG	Steals per game
BPG	Blocks per game	PPG	Points per game	**Bold**	Career high

Year	Team	GP	GS	FG	FGA	FG%	3FG	3FGA	3PA%	FT	FTA	FT%	RBG	APG	BPG	SPG	Points	PPG
1990–91	Alabama	29	22	105	277	37.9%	43	109	39.4%	**83**	**107**	77.6%	0.55	**1.86**	0.07	1.21	336	11.59
1991–92	Alabama	30	6	108	289	37.4%	49	148	33.1%	64	82	**78.0%**	2.53	1.43	0.00	1.23	329	10.97
1992–93	Alabama	31	31	125	292	**42.8%**	89	208	**42.8%**	48	62	77.4%	**3.52**	1.29	0.06	**1.42**	387	12.48
1993–94	Alabama	**33**	**33**	**156**	**385**	40.5%	**91**	**264**	34.5%	66	89	74.2%	2.97	1.52	0.09	0.88	**470**	**14.24**
Career		123	92	494	1243	39.7%	272	729	37.3%	261	340	76.8%	2.43	1.52	0.06	1.18	1522	12.37

== Professional career ==
After graduating in 1994, Harris went on to play four years professionally in Greece (Apollon), Iceland (Breiðablik), Spain (CD Universidad de Oviedo), Sweden (Ockelbo BBK), and Switzerland (ABB Baden).

After starting the year playing in Spain, Harris signed with reigning Icelandic champions Breiðablik in August 1995. She helped Breiðablik win the Icelandic Super Cup and reach the playoffs. After the season, where she averaged 26.6 points per game, she was named the Foreign Player of the Year.

In 1998, she was invited to training camp with the WNBA's Detroit Shock.

== Coaching career ==
In 2014, Harris was hired as the head coach of Florida Southern women's basketball team. In 2019, she won her second-consecutive Sunshine State Conference championship. During her stint with Florida Southern, she was a three-time Sunshine State Conference Coach of the Year and the WBCA South Region Coach of the Year in 2019. She stepped down from her post in August 2022 and took over as head coach at East Central Community College in Decatur, Mississippi.

In two years at ECCC, she led the Warriors to a 26-27 overall record.
