= Gulf South Conference men's basketball tournament =

- Conference basketball championship
- Sport: Basketball
- Conference: Gulf South Conference
- Number of teams: 8
- Format: Single-elimination tournament
- Current stadium: Pete Hanna Center
- Current location: Homewood, Alabama
- Played: 1981–present
- Current champion: West Florida (2nd)
- Most championships: Alabama–Huntsville (6); Delta State (6); North Alabama (6)
- Official website: GSC men's basketball

The Gulf South Conference men's basketball tournament serves as the annual championship event for the Gulf South Conference in men's college basketball. The tournament has been held annually since 1981. It is a single-elimination tournament and seeding is based on regular season records.

The tournament champion earns an automatic bid to the NCAA Men's Division II Basketball Championship on behalf of the Gulf South Conference.

== Results ==
| Year | Champions | Score | Runner-up | MVP | Venue |
|---|---|---|---|---|---|
| 1981 | North Alabama | 81–70 | Jacksonville State | Johnny Buckmon, North Alabama | Flowers Hall (Florence, AL) |
| 1982 | Livingston | 49–47 | Tennessee–Martin | Will Cotchery, Livingston | Pruitt Hall (Livingston, AL) |
| 1983 | Jacksonville State | 79–74 | Valdosta State | Robert Spurgeon, Jacksonville St. | Pete Mathews Coliseum (Jacksonville, AL) |
| 1984 | North Alabama | 82–78 | Jacksonville State | Melvin Allen, Jacksonville St. | Flowers Hall (Florence, AL) |
| 1985 | Jacksonville State | 86–73 | Delta State | Keith McKeller, Jacksonville St. | Pete Mathews Coliseum (Jacksonville, AL) |
| 1986 | Delta State | 83–66 | Jacksonville State | Carl Brown, Delta St. | Walter Sillers Coliseum (Cleveland, MS) |
| 1987 | West Georgia | 83–75 | Delta State | Rodney Roberts, West Georgia | UWG Coliseum (Carrollton, GA) |
| 1988 | North Alabama | 79–75 | Troy State | Louis Newsome, North Alabama | Sartain Hall (Troy, AL) |
| 1989 | Jacksonville State | 85–74 | Livingston | Robert Lee Sanders, Jacksonville St. | Pete Mathews Coliseum (Jacksonville, AL) |
| 1990 | Not held | | | | |
| 1991 | Not held | | | | |
| 1992 | Jacksonville State | 90–77 | Mississippi College | Dave Edmond, Jacksonville St. | Pete Mathews Coliseum (Jacksonville, AL) |
| 1993 | Delta State | 72–66 | Jacksonville State | Todd Mundt, Delta St. | Walter Sillers Coliseum (Cleveland, MS) |
| 1994 | North Alabama | 66–62^{OT} | Livingston | Curtis Davis, North Alabama | A. E. Wood Coliseum (Clinton, MS) |
| 1995 | Mississippi College | 86–84 | Delta State | Corey Speech, Mississippi Coll. | Flowers Hall (Florence, AL) |
| 1996 | North Alabama | 80–65 | Delta State | Corey Williams, North Alabama | Walter Sillers Coliseum (Cleveland, MS) |
| 1997 | Delta State | 75–70 | West Georgia | Chris Sykes, Delta St. | UWG Coliseum (Carrollton, GA) |
| 1998 | Delta State | 84–65 | Central Arkansas | Rodney Dean, Central Arkansas | Walter Sillers Coliseum (Cleveland, MS) |
| 1999 | Henderson State | 57–49 | Delta State | David Lewis, Henderson St. | Tex Turner Arena (Harrogate, TN) |
| 2000 | Henderson State | 67–61 | North Alabama | Andre Kerr, Henderson St. | Walter Sillers Coliseum (Cleveland, MS) |
| 2001 | Henderson State | 63–53 | Delta State | Niki Arinze, Henderson St. | BancorpSouth Arena (Tupelo, MS) |
| 2002 | West Georgia | 72–50 | Valdosta State | Chezley Watson, West Georgia | BancorpSouth Arena (Tupelo, MS) |
| 2003 | Henderson State | 54–39 | Alabama–Huntsville | Steve Parillon, Henderson St. | BancorpSouth Arena (Tupelo, MS) |
| 2004 | Montevallo | 77–65 | West Georgia | D. J. Towns, Montevallo | BancorpSouth Arena (Tupelo, MS) |
| 2005 | Montevallo | 72–60 | Delta State | James Hall, Montevallo | BancorpSouth Arena (Tupelo, MS) |
| 2006 | Delta State | 71–67 | Montevallo | Jasper Johnson, Delta St. | BancorpSouth Arena (Tupelo, MS) |
| 2007 | Montevallo | 66–62 | Henderson State | Marcus Kennedy, Montevallo | DeSoto Civic Center (Southaven, MS) |
| 2008 | Christian Brothers | 93–89 | Harding | Nick Kohs, Christian Brothers | DeSoto Civic Center (Southaven, MS) |
| 2009 | Arkansas Tech | 79–66 | Valdosta State | Renard Allen, Arkansas Tech | DeSoto Civic Center (Southaven, MS) |
| 2010 | Arkansas Tech | 64–63 | Alabama–Huntsville | Marcus Pillow, Arkansas Tech | DeSoto Civic Center (Southaven, MS) |
| 2011 | Harding | 80–61 | Arkansas Tech | Stephen Blake, Harding | DeSoto Civic Center (Southaven, MS) |
| 2012 | Alabama–Huntsville | 58–43 | Christian Brothers | Josh Magette, Alabama–Huntsville | Arena at NWFSC (Niceville, FL) |
| 2013 | Christian Brothers | 65–62 | Valdosta State | Trey Casey, Christian Brothers | Pete Hanna Center (Birmingham, AL) |
| 2014 | North Alabama | 79–73 | Christian Brothers | Rashaun Claiborne, North Alabama | Pete Hanna Center (Birmingham, AL) |
| 2015 | Alabama–Huntsville | 73–68 | West Alabama | Seab Webster, Alabama–Huntsville | Pete Hanna Center (Birmingham, AL) |
| 2016 | West Georgia | 99–82 | Alabama–Huntsville | Iakeem Alstin, Alabama–Huntsville | Pete Hanna Center (Birmingham, AL) |
| 2017 | Alabama–Huntsville | 94–91 | Valdosta State | Seab Webster, Alabama–Huntsville | Pete Hanna Center (Birmingham, AL) |
| 2018 | West Florida | 71–65 | Delta State | Marvin Jones, West Florida | Pete Hanna Center (Birmingham, AL) |
| 2019 | Delta State | 64-60 | Alabama–Huntsville | Matthew Wilson, Delta State | Pete Hanna Center (Birmingham, AL) |
| 2020 | Alabama–Huntsville | 91–82 | Valdosta State | JJ Kaplan, Alabama—Huntsville | Pete Hanna Center (Birmingham, AL) |
| 2021 | Valdosta State | 75–70 | Alabama–Huntsville | Burke Putnam, Valdosta State | Trustmark Arena (Montevallo, AL) |
| 2022 | Alabama–Huntsville | 86–72 | Union (TN) | CJ Williamson, Alabama–Huntsville | Pete Hanna Center (Birmingham, AL) |
| 2023 | West Alabama | 67–65 | West Georgia | Justin Allison, West Alabama | Pete Hanna Center (Birmingham, AL) |
| 2024 | West Georgia | 75–69 | Alabama–Huntsville | Zawdie Jackson, West Georgia | Pete Hanna Center (Birmingham, AL) |
| 2025 | Alabama–Huntsville | 101–95 | Valdosta State | Blake Campbell, Alabama–Huntsville | Pete Hanna Center (Birmingham, AL) |
| 2026 | West Florida | 76–69 | West Alabama | Aric Demings, West Florida | Pruitt Hall (Livingston, AL) |

== Championship records ==
| School | Finals Record | Finals Appearances | Years |
|---|---|---|---|
| North Alabama | 6–1 | 7 | 1981, 1984, 1998, 1994, 1996, 2014 |
| Alabama–Huntsville | 6–6 | 12 | 2012, 2015, 2017, 2020, 2022, 2025 |
| Delta State | 6–8 | 14 | 1986, 1993, 1997, 1998, 2006, 2019 |
| Jacksonville State | 4–4 | 8 | 1983, 1985, 1989, 1992 |
| West Georgia | 4–3 | 7 | 1987, 2002, 2016, 2024 |
| Henderson State | 4–1 | 5 | 1999, 2000, 2001, 2003 |
| Montevallo | 3–1 | 4 | 2004, 2005, 2007 |
| West Alabama (Livingston) | 2–4 | 6 | 1982, 2023 |
| Christian Brothers | 2–2 | 4 | 2008, 2013 |
| Arkansas Tech | 2–1 | 3 | 2009, 2010 |
| West Florida | 2–0 | 2 | 2018, 2026 |
| Valdosta State | 1–7 | 8 | 2021 |
| Harding | 1–1 | 2 | 2011 |
| Mississippi College | 1–1 | 2 | 1995 |
| Central Arkansas | 0–1 | 1 | |
| Troy (Troy State) | 0–1 | 1 | |
| Tennessee–Martin | 0–1 | 1 | |
| Union (TN) | 0–1 | 1 | |

- Auburn–Montgomery, Lee (TN), and Trevecca Nazarene have not yet reached the tournament final.
- Arkansas–Monticello, Lincoln Memorial, Ouachita Baptist, Shorter, and Southern Arkansas never reached the tournament finals before departing the Gulf South.
- Schools highlighted in pink are former members of the Gulf South Conference, as of the upcoming 2026–27 season.

== See also ==
- NCAA Division II men's basketball tournament
- Gulf South Conference women's basketball tournament
