= West Georgia Wolves women's basketball =

West Georgia Wolves
2025–26 West Georgia Wolves women's basketball team
- University: University of West Georgia
- First season: 1979–80
- Head coach: Joanna Reitz (3rd season)
- Location: Carrollton, Georgia
- Arena: The Coliseum (capacity: 6,469)
- Conference: UAC
- Nickname: Wolves
- Colors: Blue and red

NCAA Division II tournament Sweet Sixteen
- 1992, 1994

NCAA Division II tournament appearances
- 1989, 1990, 1992, 1994, 2008

Conference tournament champions
- Gulf South: 1992, 1994, 2024

The West Georgia Wolves women's basketball team, known previously as the West Georgia Braves, represents the University of West Georgia in Carrollton, Georgia in women's NCAA Division I college basketball.

From 2024, the Wolves have been members of the United Athletic Conference. Due to the NCAA's policy on reclassifying programs, the Wolves will not be eligible to compete in the NCAA tournament until the 2028–29 season.

== Postseason ==
=== NCAA Division II ===
The Braves and Wolves made five appearances in the NCAA Division II women's basketball tournament. They had a combined record of 3–5.

Year	Round	Opponent	Result
1989	First round	Jacksonville State	L 81–84
1990	First round	Jacksonville State	L 66–77
1992	First round Regional final	Fort Valley State; Delta State	W 96–68; L 53–73
1994	Second round Regional final	Florida Southern; North Alabama	W 103–74; L 63–64
2008	First round Regional semifinals	Nova Southeastern; Delta State	W 71–66; L 43–58

== See also ==
- West Georgia Wolves
