= 1994 SEC women's basketball tournament =

American college basketball postseason tournament

- Classification: Division I
- Teams: 12
- Site: McKenzie Arena; Chattanooga, TN
- Champions: Tennessee (6th title)
- Winning coach: Pat Summitt (6th title)
- MVP: Tiffany Woosley (Tennessee)
- Attendance: 28,444

The 1994 Southeastern Conference women's basketball tournament was the postseason women's basketball tournament for the Southeastern Conference (SEC) held at the McKenzie Arena in Chattanooga, Tennessee, from March 4 – 7, 1994. The Tennessee Lady Volunteers won the tournament and earned an automatic bid to the 1994 NCAA Division I women's basketball tournament.

== Seeds ==
All teams in the conference participated in the tournament. Teams were seeded by their conference record.

Seed	School	Conference record	Overall record	Tiebreaker
1	Tennessee^{‡†}	11–0	31–2	
2	Vanderbilt^{†}	9–2	25–8	
3	Florida^{†}	8–3	22–7	
4	Alabama^{†}	7–4	26–7	
5	Ole Miss	7–4	24–9	
6	Auburn	6–5	20–10	
7	Kentucky	5–6	17–11	
8	Georgia	5–6	17–11	
9	Arkansas	3–8	15–14	
10	South Carolina	2–9	14–13	
11	LSU	2–9	11–16	
12	Mississippi State	1–10	8–18	
‡ – SEC regular season champions, and tournament No. 1 seed. † – Received a bye in the conference tournament. Overall records include all games played in the SEC Tournament.

== Schedule ==
Game	Matchup^{#}	Score
First Round – Fri, Feb 28
1	No. 8 Georgia vs. No. 9 Arkansas	84–62
2	No. 5 Ole Miss vs. No. 12 Mississippi State	100–64
3	No. 7 Kentucky vs. No. 10 South Carolina	83–80
4	No. 6 Auburn vs. No. 11 LSU	76–73
Quarterfinal – Sat, Mar 1
5	No. 1 Tennessee vs. No. 8 Georgia	86–72
6	No. 4 Alabama vs. No. 5 Ole Miss	86–84
7	No. 2 Vanderbilt vs. No. 7 Kentucky	83–80
8	No. 3 Florida vs. No. 6 Auburn	72–67
Semifinal – Sun, Mar 2
9	No. 1 Tennessee vs. No. 4 Alabama	72–56
10	No. 2 Vanderbilt vs. No. 3 Florida	94–72
Championship – Mon, Mar 3
11	No. 1 Tennessee vs. No. 2 Vanderbilt	82–57
# – Rankings denote tournament seed

== Bracket ==
First round Fri, Feb 28
8	Georgia	84
9	Arkansas	62
5	Ole Miss	100
12	Mississippi State	64
7	Kentucky	83
10	South Carolina	80
6	Auburn	76
11	LSU	73

Quarterfinals; Sat, Mar 1
1	Tennessee	86
8	Georgia	72
4	Alabama	86
5	Ole Miss	84
2	Vanderbilt	83
7	Kentucky	80
3	Florida	72
6	Auburn	67

Semifinals; Sun, Mar 2
1	Tennessee	72
4	Alabama	56
2	Vanderbilt	94
3	Florida	72

Championship; Mon, Mar 3
1	Tennessee	82
2	Vanderbilt	57
