= 1994 NAIA Division II women's basketball tournament =

- Teams: 24
- Finals site: Physical Education Building, (Oregon)
- Champions: Northern State Wolves (2nd title, 2nd title game, 2nd Fab Four)
- Runner-up: Western Oregon Wolves (1st title game, 2nd Fab Four)
- Semifinalists: Concordia Falcons (1st Fab Four); Mount Mercy Mustangs (1st Fab Four)
- Coach of the year: Curt Frederickson (Northern State)
- Chuck Taylor MVP: Paula Stolsmark (Northern State)
- Top scorer: Vernetra Allen (Panhandle State) (74 points)

The 1994 NAIA Division I women's basketball tournament was the tournament held by the NAIA to determine the national champion of women's college basketball among its Division II members in the United States and Canada for the 1993–94 basketball season.

This was the third NAIA women's tournament held exclusively for Division II teams.

Northern State (SD) defeated defending champions Western Oregon in the championship game, 48–45, to claim the Wolves' second NAIA national title.

The tournament was played at the Physical Education Building at Western Oregon State College in Monmouth, Oregon.

== Qualification ==
The tournament field expanded for the first time, increasing from 20 to 24 teams. The top twelve teams received seeds, with the top eight receiving a bye to the second round. The remaining lowest-ranked teams were placed in the preliminary first round.

The tournament utilized a single-elimination format.

== Bracket ==
First round
Georgetown (KY)	66
Tennessee Wesleyan	77
9	St. Joseph's (ME)	79
10	Panhandle State	94
Shawnee State	77
Westbrook	47
Caldwell	50
Huntington	64
Friends (KS)	65
South Dakota Tech	80
Evangel	69
Hastings	61
11	Mary (ND)	88
12	Lynn	56
Spring Arbor	82
Wilmington (DE)	95

Second round
1	Northern State (SD)	81
Tennessee Wesleyan	51
10	Panhandle State	92
8	Indiana Tech	78
5	Hardin-Simmons	64
Shawnee State	77
Huntington (IN)	58
4	Concordia (WI)	69
3	Western Oregon	82
South Dakota Tech	75
Evangel	58
6	Lewis & Clark	59
7	Findlay	62
11	Mary (ND)	59
Wilmington (DE)	83
2	Mount Mercy	95

Quarterfinals
1	Northern State	108
10	Panhandle State	91
Shawnee State	74
4	Concordia (WI)	80
3	Western Oregon	69
6	Lewis & Clark	57
7	Findlay	67
2	Mount Mercy	68

Semifinals
1	Northern State	66
4	Concordia (WI)	56
3	Western Oregon	82
2	Mount Mercy	74

National championship
1	Northern State	48
3	Western Oregon	45

== See also ==
- 1994 NAIA Division II men's basketball tournament
- 1994 NCAA Division I women's basketball tournament
- 1994 NCAA Division II women's basketball tournament
- 1994 NCAA Division III women's basketball tournament
- 1994 NAIA Division I women's basketball tournament
