= JJ Kaplan =

American-Israeli basketball player

JJ Kaplan ג'יי ג'יי קפלן
No. 3 – Hapoel HaEmek
- Position: Shooting guard / small forward
- League: Israeli Basketball Premier League

Personal information
- Born: 28 May 1997 (age 29) Huntsville, Alabama, United States
- Listed height: 6 ft 5 in (1.96 m)
- Listed weight: 210 lb (95 kg)

Career information
- High school: Virgil I. Grissom High School (Huntsville, Alabama)
- College: University of Alabama in Huntsville
- Playing career: 2021–present

Career history
- 2021–2025: Ironi Kiryat Ata
- 2025–2026: Maccabi Rishon LeZion
- 2026–present: Hapoel HaEmek

Career highlights
- All-Gulf South Conference First Team (2021); All-Gulf South Conference Second Team (2019, 2020); GSC Tournament Most Outstanding Player (2020); Jewish Sports Review All-American (2019, 2020)

Jarrett Jay Kaplan (Hebrew: ג'יי ג'יי קפלן; born May 28, 1997) is an American-Israeli basketball player for Hapoel HaEmek in the Israeli Basketball Premier League. He played college basketball for the Chargers at the University of Alabama in Huntsville.

== Early life and high school ==
Kaplan was born and grew up in Huntsville, Alabama, is Jewish, and had a bar mitzvah and keeps kosher. He is 6 ft 5 in (196 cm) tall, and weighs 210 pounds (95 kg).

He attended Virgil I. Grissom High School ('16) in Huntsville, Alabama. Playing basketball for the Tigers in his junior season, Kaplan was named to the all-area team and the all-area tournament team. In his senior season, he averaged 16 points, 12 rebounds, and three assists per game, was named to the all-area and all-state teams, and was named to the all-area tournament team. As a teenager, he also played in Maccabi Games in Germany with Team USA.

== College career ==
Kaplan attended and played basketball for the Chargers at the University of Alabama in Huntsville ('21), as he double-majored in Economics and Finance. In 2017–18, he averaged 3.2 points and 2.6 rebounds per game.

In 2018–19, Kaplan averaged 13.7 points and 8.6 rebounds (2nd in the Gulf South Conference (GSC)) per game, and was 2nd in the conference in field goal percentage (52.8%), and was 21st in the nation with 281 rebounds. He was named Jewish Sports Review All-American, Second Team All-Gulf South Conference, Gulf South All-Tournament Team, College Sports Information Directors of America (CoSIDA) Academic All-District, GSC All-Academic Team, and GSC Academic Honor Roll.

In 2019–20, he averaged 11.6 points and 9.1 rebounds (2nd in the GSC) per game, and led the GSC and was 21st in the nation in total rebounds (282). Kaplan was named Jewish Sports Review All-American, Second Team All-Gulf South Conference, GSC Tournament Most Outstanding Player, GSC All-Tournament Team, CoSIDA Academic All-District, and GSC Academic Honor Roll.

In 2020–21, despite a shin injury, Kaplan averaged 11.8 points and 7.4 rebounds per game. He was named First Team All-Gulf South Conference in 2021. Career-wise, he had the fourth-most rebounds and ninth-most rebounds-per-game in school history.

== Professional career ==
On June 27, 2021, after living his entire life in Huntsville, Kaplan signed with Ironi Kiryat Ata. He said: "It has been a dream of mine to play basketball in Israel since I was in high school, and now I am happy to announce that the dream has come true." That season, he and the team won a National League championship.

On November 19, 2022, Kaplan again signed with Ironi Kiryat Ata, in the Israeli Basketball Premier League.
