= 1993–94 Purdue Boilermakers women's basketball team =

Intercollegiate basketball season

1993–94 Purdue Boilermakers women's basketball

Big Ten co-champions

NCAA tournament, Final Four
- Conference: Big Ten Conference

Ranking
- Coaches: No. 3
- AP: No. 10
- Record: 29–5 (16–2 B1G)
- Head coach: Lin Dunn (7th season)
- Home arena: Mackey Arena

1993–94 Big Ten women's basketball standings
	Conf.				Overall
Team	W		L	PCT	W		L	PCT
No. 4 Penn State	16	–	2	.889	28	–	3	.903
No. 10 Purdue	16	–	2	.889	29	–	5	.853
No. 13 Iowa	13	–	5	.722	21	–	7	.750
Indiana	10	–	8	.556	19	–	9	.679
Minnesota	10	–	8	.556	18	–	11	.621
Northwestern	9	–	9	.500	17	–	10	.630
Ohio State	7	–	11	.389	14	–	14	.500
Michigan State	7	–	11	.389	12	–	15	.444
Wisconsin	6	–	12	.333	13	–	14	.481
Illinois	5	–	13	.278	10	–	17	.370
Michigan	0	–	18	.000	3	–	24	.111
Rankings from AP Poll

The 1993–94 Purdue Boilermakers women's basketball team represented Purdue University as a member of the Big Ten Conference during the 1993–94 NCAA Division I women's basketball season. Led by seventh-year head coach Lin Dunn, this was the first Purdue women's basketball team to reach the NCAA Final Four. The team tied for the Big Ten championship with Penn State with a 16–2 record in conference play. The Boilermakers played their home games at Mackey Arena in West Lafayette, Indiana.

== Schedule ==
Date time, TV	Rank^{#}	Opponent^{#}	Result	Record	Site (attendance) city, state
Regular season
NCAA tournament
Mar 24, 1994*	(1 W) No. 10	vs. (13 W) Texas A&M; Regional Semifinal – Sweet Sixteen	W 82–56	28–4	Maples Pavilion; Palo Alto, California
Mar 26, 1994*	(1 W) No. 10	at (2 W) No. 11 Stanford; Regional Final – Elite Eight	W 82–65	29–4	Maples Pavilion; Palo Alto, California
Apr 1, 1994*	(1 W) No. 10	vs. (3 E) No. 5 North Carolina; National Semifinal – Final Four	L 74–89	29–5	Richmond Coliseum; Richmond, Virginia
*Non-conference game. ^{#}Rankings from AP Poll. (#) Tournament seedings in parentheses. All times are in Eastern Time.

== Rankings ==
Ranking movements Legend: ██ Increase in ranking ██ Decrease in ranking
	Week																	
Poll	Pre	1	2	3	4	5	6	7	8	9	10	11	12	13	14	15	16	Final
AP	23	23	23	22	18	16	17	16	13	13	13	12	11	9	10	10	10	Not released
Coaches	24	23	22	19	18	15	16	14	13	14	13	13	10	9	11	10	11	3

^Coaches did not release a Week 2 poll.
