= Mamadou Sissako =

French footballer (born 1996)

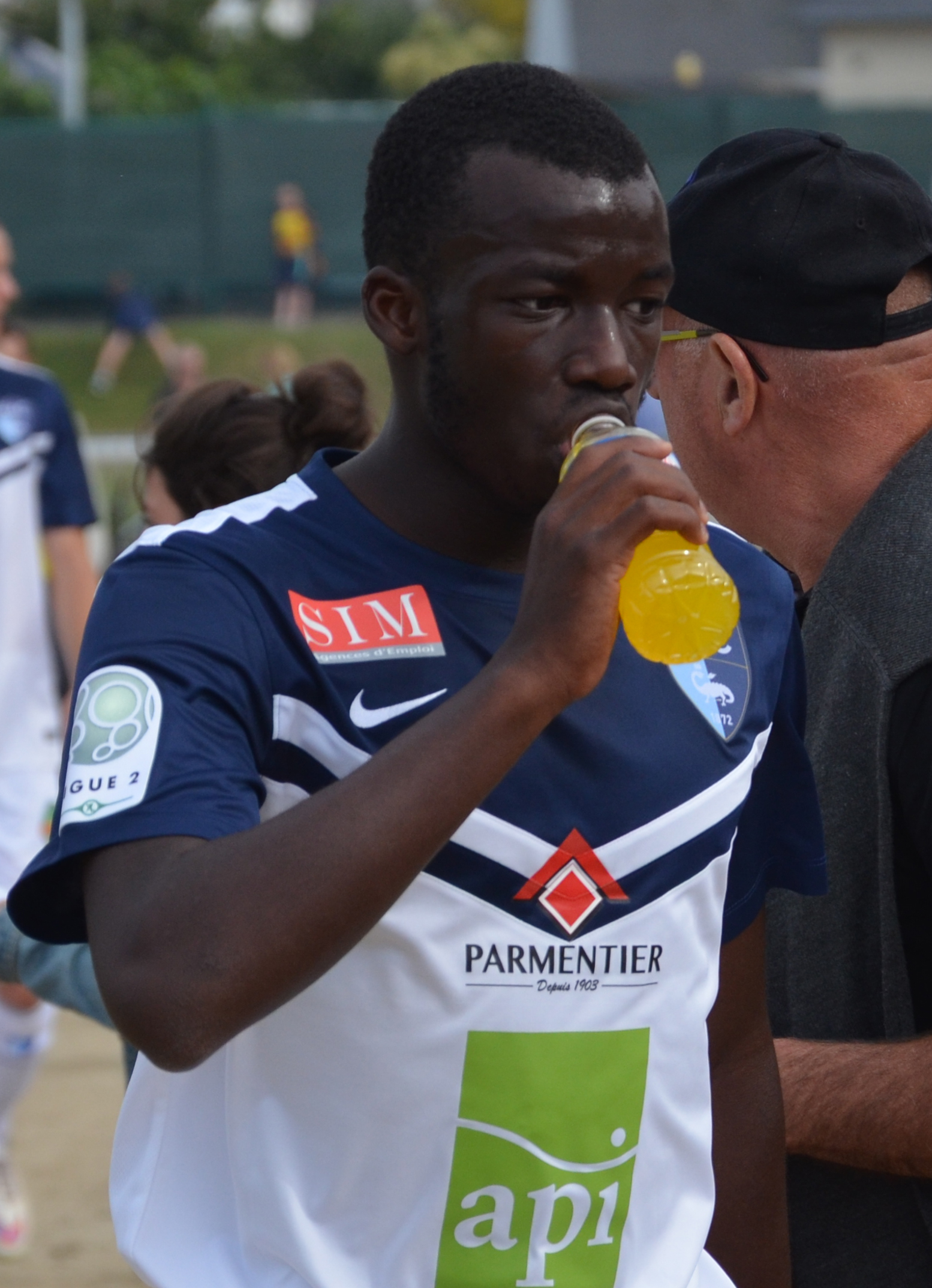
- Sissako with Le Havre in 2015

Personal information
- Full name: Mamadou Sissako
- Date of birth: 20 April 1996 (age 30)
- Place of birth: Villepinte, France
- Height: 1.71 m (5 ft 7 in)
- Position: Forward

Team information
- Current team: FC 93

Youth career
- 2002–2009: Espérance Aulnaysienne
- 2009–2016: Le Havre

Senior career*
Years	Team	Apps	(Gls)
2012–2016	Le Havre B	78	(8)
2015	Le Havre	0	(0)
2016–2019	Troyes B	27	(6)
2018–2019	Troyes	0	(0)
2021–	FC 93	0	(0)

International career
2011	France U16	2	(0)
2012–2013	France U17	3	(0)
2013	France U18	2	(0)
- * Club domestic league appearances and goals as of 06:28, 17 January 2022 (UTC)

Mamadou Sissako (born 20 April 1996) is a French professional footballer who plays as a forward for Championnat National 1 club FC 93.

== Club career ==
Sissako joined Troyes on 27 July 2016 after playing for Le Havre. He made his professional debut for Troyes in a 1–1 (4–3) Coupe de France penalty shootout win over Saint-Étienne on 24 January 2018.

In December 2021, Sissako joined FC 93.

== International career ==
Sissako was born in France and is of Mauritanian descent. He represented France at youth international level.
