= Frédéric Cissokho =

French footballer (born 1971)

Frédéric Cissokho (born 19 April 1971 in Rouen) is a French former professional footballer who played as a defender. He made 36 appearances in Ligue 2 for Wasquehal in the 1997–98 season.
