= North Alabama Lions women's basketball =

North Alabama Lions
2026–27 North Alabama Lions women's basketball team
- University: University of North Alabama
- Head coach: Anna Nimz (1st season)
- Location: Florence, Alabama
- Arena: Flowers Hall (capacity: 2,223)
- Conference: UAC
- Nickname: Lions
- Colors: Purple and gold

NCAA Division II tournament Final Four
- 1994
Other NCAA Division II tournament results
Elite Eight	1994
Sweet Sixteen	1984, 1985, 1994
Appearances	1984, 1985, 1991, 1994, 2011, 2013, 2017

Conference regular-season champions
- 1985

The North Alabama Lions women's basketball team represents University of North Alabama in Florence, Alabama, United States. The school's team formerly competed in the Gulf South Conference. In 2026, they joined the rebranded United Athletic Conference.

== History ==
The women's basketball program began at the University of North Alabama in the late 1960s as part of the physical education department, but has grown into a nationally respected program that has made four trips to the NCAA Division II national tournament since 1984. Initially competing against other schools in competitions known as extramurals, the UNA women's basketball began competing under the Association for Intercollegiate Athletics for Women (AIAW) in 1975, with Susan Phillips as head coach. Phillips coached the Lions from 1975 to 1977 and was followed for one year by Sharron Perkins.

Then, in 1978, the Lions made their first move to regional and national prominence with the hiring of Gary Elliott as head coach. Over the next four seasons, Elliott compiled a 75–42 record that included the 1979–80 Alabama Association of Intercollegiate Athletics for Women (AAIAW) State Championship and the 1981–82 AAIAW Northern Division championship. Those years also produced the school's first women's basketball All-American in Wanda Beckham, who was a second-team AIAW selection in 1980.

Major change came in 1982 when women's sports were included for the first time as championships under both the Gulf South Conference and the NCAA. It was also the year that Wayne Byrd was hired to succeed Elliott as the fourth women's basketball coach in school history. Byrd directed the UNA women's program for the next 16 years, winning 232 games while leading the Lions to one Gulf South Conference championship and four NCAA Division II regionals.

The UNA women's basketball program received its first NCAA Division II Top 20 ranking on January 16, 1984, when the Lions debuted in the poll at No. 20. The 1983–84 Lions were ranked in the Top 20 for eight straight weeks and advanced to the championship game of the Division II South Regional. In 1993–94, Byrd led the Lions an NCAA South Regional championship and a third-place finish at the Division II Elite Eight in Fargo, N.D. The Wayne Byrd era at UNA also included three All-Americans, with LaConger Cohran and Brenda Mayes earning national awards in 1985, and Serita Gauldin becoming the school's first, first-team All-America pick in women's basketball in 1998. In 1997–98, UNA guard Becky Mauck led the NCAA Division II in both free throw percentage and three-point field goal percentage, becoming the first player in Division II women's basketball history to lead the nation in two shooting categories in the same season. Mauck also established an NCAA Division II National Record for three-point percentage in a season at 56.25.

With Byrd's retirement in 1998, Jeri Porter became the fifth head women's basketball coach in school history.

Jeri Porter resigned as women's head coach at the end of the 2001–02 season to take a job with Radford.

Flora Willie led the Lady Lions to a 16–12 record in the 2002–03 season and served as the UNA coach through the 2005–06 season.

Terry Fowler became the sixth head women's basketball coach in UNA history in 2006 and took the first step in rebuilding the winning tradition with a solid 14–14 mark in his inaugural season. UNA's Amber Rutherford led Division II in free throw percentage at 93.7, and the Lions returned to the Gulf South Conference Tournament for the first time since 2003.

Following an NCAA Tournament appearance in 2013, Fowler left to become the head coach at the University of South Alabama. UNA then hired Missy Tiber, who coached for five seasons before leading the program as the school began its transition to NCAA Division I basketball in the 2018–19 season.

The Lions posted a 21–9 record during its first Division I season, earning a No. 4 seed in the ASUN Tournament with a 10–6 league record after being picked to finish eighth in the preseason coaches' poll. The following season, the Lions posted a 21–9 mark, giving UNA three straight 20-win seasons for the first time in program history.

Following a successful debut at the Division I level, Tiber's second Division I team at UNA continued to reach new heights. Led by a senior class that won a school-record 85 games and included the top two scorers in program history, the Lions set 14 school records at the single-season and career levels.

In March 2024, Candi Whitaker was announced as the program's eighth head coach.

== Postseason ==
=== NCAA Division II tournament results ===
The Lions made seven appearances in the NCAA Division II women's basketball tournament. They had a combined record of 6–7.

Year	Round	Opponent	Result
1984	First Round; Regional Finals	Alabama A&M; Valdosta State	W, 78–59; L, 76–81
1985	First Round; Regional Finals	Mississippi Women; Mercer	W, 89–77; L, 86–90 (OT)
1991	First Round	Jacksonville State	L, 80–81
1994	First Round; Regional Finals; Elite Eight; Final Four; Third Place	Tampa; West Georgia; Clarion; North Dakota State; Bellarmine	W, 92–83; W, 64–63; W, 75–69; L, 56–123; W, 79–75
2011	First Round	Delta State	L, 47–56
2013	First Round	Delta State	L, 41–51
2018	First Round	Lee	L, 64–66

=== WBI results ===
The Lions have appeared in the Women's Basketball Invitational (WBI) once. Their record is 2–1.

Year	Round	Opponent	Result
2019	First Round; Quarterfinals; Semifinals	Georgia State; Southern Miss; North Texas	W 64–57; W 69–65 (OT); L 53–56
