= 1994 NAIA Division I women's basketball tournament =

- Teams: 32
- Finals site: Oman Arena, Jackson, Tennessee
- Champions: Southern Nazarene Redskins (2nd title, 2nd title game, 3rd Fab Four)
- Runner-up: David Lipscomb Bisons (1st title game, 1st Fab Four)
- Semifinalists: Auburn Montgomery Warhawks (1st Fab Four); Montevallo Falcons (1st Fab Four)
- Coach of the year: Jerry Finkbeiner (Southern Nazarene)
- Charles Stevenson Hustle Award: Cherilyn Morris (Southern Nazarene)
- Chuck Taylor MVP: JoAnna Bailey (Southern Nazarene)
- Top scorer: Beth Stewart (David Lipscomb) (121 points)

The 1994 NAIA Division I women's basketball tournament was the tournament held by the NAIA to determine the national champion of women's college basketball among its Division I members in the United States and Canada for the 1993–94 basketball season.

Top-seeded Southern Nazarene defeated David Lipscomb in the championship game, 97–74, to claim the Redskins' second NAIA national title. This would ultimately be the first of four consecutive championships for Southern Nazarene.

The tournament was played at the Oman Arena in Jackson, Tennessee.

== Qualification ==
The tournament field remained fixed at thirty-two teams, with the top sixteen teams receiving seeds.

The tournament continued to utilize a simple single-elimination format.

== Bracket ==
First round
1	Southern Nazarene	94
Western New Mexico	56
Northern Montana	53
16	SE Oklahoma State	58
9	Simon Fraser	75
Fresno Pacific	64
Rockhurst	49
8	Union (TN)	59
5	SW Oklahoma State	59
Lees-McRae	57
Berry (GA)	67
12	Midwestern State	91
13	Central State (OH)	69
Oklahoma City	64
Rosary (IL)	59
4	Auburn Montgomery	103
3	Belmont	92
Mary Hardin-Baylor	72
East Texas Baptist	64
14	Phillips (OK)	80
11	Claflin	78
St. Ambrose	85
Wheeling Jesuit	67
6	Montevallo	88
7	David Lipscomb	89
Lindenwood	59
Rio Grande	79
10	Campbellsville	82
15	Xavier Louisiana	50
Minnesota Duluth	64
Saint Vincent	54
2	Arkansas Tech	92

Second round
1	Southern Nazarene	83
16	SE Oklahoma State	67
9	Simon Fraser	59
8	Union (TN)	64
5	SW Oklahoma State	68
12	Midwestern State	54
13	Central State (OH)	76
4	Auburn Montgomery	85
3	Belmont	80
14	Phillips (OK)	66
St. Ambrose	75
6	Montevallo	85*
7	David Lipscomb	80
10	Campbellsville	65
Minnesota Duluth	63
2	Arkansas Tech	67

Elite Eight
1	Southern Nazarene	75
8	Union (TN)	71
5	SW Oklahoma State	60
4	Auburn Montgomery	69
3	Belmont	71
6	Montevallo	83
7	David Lipscomb	85
2	Arkansas Tech	67

Final Four
1	Southern Nazarene	83
4	Auburn Montgomery	81
6	Montevallo	72
7	David Lipscomb	79

National championship
1	Southern Nazarene	97
7	David Lipscomb	74

== See also ==
- 1994 NAIA Division I men's basketball tournament
- 1994 NCAA Division I women's basketball tournament
- 1994 NCAA Division II women's basketball tournament
- 1994 NCAA Division III women's basketball tournament
- 1994 NAIA Division II women's basketball tournament
