= 1994 NAIA Division I men's basketball tournament =

College basketball tournament

- Teams: 32
- Finals site: Mabee Center; Tulsa, Oklahoma
- Champions: Oklahoma City (3 title, 3 title game, 3 Fab Four)
- Runner-up: Life (1 title game, 1 Fab Four)
- Semifinalists: Oklahoma Baptist (3 Final Four); Midwestern State (4 Final Four)
- Charles Stevenson Hustle Award: Billy Lewis (Life (GA))
- Chuck Taylor MVP: Kevin Franklin (Oklahoma City)

The 1994 NAIA Men's Division I Basketball Tournament was held in March at Mabee Center in Tulsa, Oklahoma. The 57th annual NAIA basketball tournament featured 32 teams playing in a single-elimination format. This was the first the NAIA Tournament played at Mabee Center in Tulsa. For the previous 24 years (1975-1993), Kemper Arena in Kansas City, Missouri had hosted the tournament.

== Awards and honors ==
- Leading scorers:
- Leading rebounder:
- Player of the Year: John Pierce (David Lipscomb College).

== 1994 NAIA bracket ==
First round	Second round
1	Georgetown (KY)	74
-	Rocky Mountain	68
1	Georgetown (KY)	71
16	Oklahoma Baptist	98
16	Oklahoma Baptist	101
-	Western Washington	93*
TOP TIER
9	Pfeiffer	78
-	Spring Hill	69
9	Pfeiffer	80
8	Belmont	99
8	Belmont	91
-	Hawaii–Hilo	83
5	Oklahoma City	104
-	Siena Heights	99
5	Oklahoma City	86
-	St. Mary’s (TX)	75
-	St. Mary's (TX)	79
12	Lipscomb	62
TOP TIER
13	Westminster (PA)	72
-	Auburn Montgomery	67
-	Westminster (PA)	66
4	Drury	74
4	Drury	96
-	Ozarks (AR)	88
-	Westmont	75
3	Salem	71
-	Westmont	65
-	Life	85
-	Life	78
14	Oklahoma Christian	73
BOTTOM TIER
11	Azusa Pacific	76
-	Transylvania	73
6	Azusa Pacific	78
11	Hawaii Pacific	97
6	Hawaii Pacific	81
-	Missouri Baptist	79*
-	Midwestern State	74
7	Mobile	61
-	Midwestern State	81
-	Georgia Southwestern	78
-	Georgia Southwestern State	98
10	The Master’s	86
BOTTOM TIER
15	Benedict	67
-	Incarnate Word	63
15	Benedict	81
2	NW Oklahoma State	68
2	NW Oklahoma State	63
-	St. Francis (IL)	48

Elite Eight
16	Oklahoma Baptist	89
8	Belmont	76
5	Oklahoma City	90
4	Drury	70
-	Life	96
6	Hawaii Pacific	76
-	Midwestern State	68
15	Benedict	60

NAIA national semifinals
16	Oklahoma Baptist	85
5	Oklahoma City	86
-	Life	85
-	Midwestern State	67

NAIA national championship
5	Oklahoma City	99
-	Life	81

- * denotes overtime.

== See also ==
- 1994 NAIA Division II men's basketball tournament
- 1994 NCAA Division I men's basketball tournament
- 1994 NCAA Division II men's basketball tournament
- 1994 NCAA Division III men's basketball tournament
- 1994 NAIA Division I women's basketball tournament
