= Jacksonville State Gamecocks women's basketball =

Jacksonville State Gamecocks
| 2026–27 Jacksonville State Gamecocks women's basketball team |
- University: Jacksonville State University
- Head coach: Ricky Austin (1st season)
- Location: Jacksonville, Alabama
- Arena: Pete Mathews Coliseum (capacity: 3,500)
- Conference: Conference USA
- Nickname: Gamecocks
- Colors: Red and white

NCAA Division I tournament Elite Eight
- D-II: 1991
Other NCAA Division I tournament results
| Sweet Sixteen | D-II: 1991 |
| Appearances | D-II: 1988, 1989, 1990, 1991, 1993 |

Conference tournament champions
- D-II: 1993 (Gulf South Conference)

Conference regular-season champions
- 1991 (GSC)

Conference division champions
- 2022

Uniforms
| Home | Away |

The Jacksonville State Gamecocks women's basketball team represents Jacksonville State University (JSU), located in Jacksonville, Alabama, in NCAA Division I women's basketball. The Gamecocks compete as members of Conference USA.

== History ==
Jacksonville State began play in 1976 with official play beginning in 1982. They have made the NCAA Tournament in 1988, 1989, 1990, 1991, and 1993, with an Elite Eight appearance in 1991. That year, they beat Valdosta State 103–84, North Alabama 81–80, Delta State 71–67 before losing to Bentley 97–92. They were champions of the Gulf South Conference in 1991 and tournament champions in 1993, with the latter championship occurring in their final season in that league. JSU began a transition to NCAA Division I in 1993, initially playing as an independent before joining the ASUN (then known as the Trans America Athletic Conference) in 1995. The Gamecocks joined the Ohio Valley Conference (OVC) in 2003. As of the end of the 2015–16 season, the Gamecocks have an all-time record of 481–595. JSU will return to the ASUN Conference in July 2021 after spending 18 seasons in the Ohio Valley Conference.

== Postseason ==
=== NCAA Division II tournament results ===
The Gamecocks made five appearances in the NCAA Division II women's basketball tournament. They had a combined record of 5–5.

| Year | Round | Opponent | Result |
|---|---|---|---|
| 1988 | First Round; Regional Finals | Fort Valley State; Delta State | W, 79–70; L, 54–64 |
| 1989 | First Round; Regional Finals | West Georgia; Delta State | W, 84–81; L, 48–64 |
| 1990 | First Round; Regional Finals | West Georgia; Delta State | W, 77–66; L, 56–92 |
| 1991 | First Round; Regional Finals; Elite Eight | North Alabama; Delta State; Bentley | W, 81–80; W, 71–67; L, 92–97 |
| 1993 | First Round | Delta State | L, 61–90 |
