= 1994 NCAA Division III women's basketball tournament =

- Teams: 40
- Finals site: , Eau Claire, Wisconsin
- Champions: Capital Crusaders (1st title)
- Runner-up: Washington University Bears (1st title game)
- Third place: Wisconsin–Eau Claire Blugolds (1st Final Four)
- Fourth place: Wheaton Lyons (1st Final Four)
- Winning coach: Dixie Jeffers (1st title)

The 1994 NCAA Division III women's basketball tournament was the 13th annual tournament hosted by the NCAA to determine the national champion of Division III women's collegiate basketball in the United States.

Capital defeated Washington University in St. Louis in the championship game, 82–63, to claim the Crusaders' first Division III national title.

The championship rounds were hosted by the University of Wisconsin–Eau Claire in Eau Claire, Wisconsin.

== Bracket ==
- An asterisk by a team indicates the host of first and second round games
- An asterisk by a score indicates an overtime period

=== Mid-Atlantic sectional ===
First Round; March 3, 1994
Upsala	81
Elizabethtown*	70

Second Round; March 5, 1994
Wheaton (MA)*	75
Salem State	69
Campus sites
Rowan*	65
Upsala	73
Western Connecticut*	53
Babson	76
Campus sites
Scranton*	80
William Paterson	63

Sectional semifinals March 11, 1994
Wheaton (MA)	82
Upsala	77
Scranton, PA
Babson	62
Scranton	69

Sectional finals March 12, 1994
Wheaton (MA)	81*
Scranton	80

=== Atlantic sectional ===
First Round; March 2, 1994
Geneseo State*	79
William Smith	60
Penn State Behrend*	92
Denison	73

Second Round; March 5, 1994
St. John Fisher*	68
Geneseo State	63
Campus sites
Wittenberg*	62
Defiance	65
NYU*	86
Buffalo State	64
Campus sites
Capital*	96
Penn State Behrend	75

Sectional semifinals March 11, 1994
St. John Fisher	55
Defiance	59
Columbus, OH
NYU	51
Capital	74

Sectional finals March 12, 1994
Defiance	64
Capital	89

=== South sectional ===
First Round; March 2, 1994
Central (IA)*	82
Lake Forest	71
Roanoke*	67
NC Wesleyan	70
Aurora (IL)*	61
Wartburg	57

Second Round; March 5, 1994
Marymount (VA)*	97
Mary Washington	80
Campus sites
Millikin*	76
Central (IA)	61
Maryville (TN)*	84
NC Wesleyan	65
Campus sites
Washington St. Louis*	77
Aurora	68

Sectional semifinals March 11, 1994
Marymount (VA)	68
Millikin	85
Arlington, VA
Maryville (TN)	77
Washington St. Louis	94

Sectional finals March 12, 1994
Millikin	63
Washington St. Louis	67

=== Great Lakes sectional ===
First Round; March 2, 1994
Franklin*	59
Alma	74
St. Thomas (MN)*	90
Pomona–Pitzer	65

Second Round; March 5, 1994
Wisconsin–Oshkosh*	63
Alma	59
Campus sites
Bethel (MN)*	65
Concordia Moorhead	61
Wisconsin–Stout*	76
Wisconsin–Eau Claire	87
Campus sites
St. Benedict*	83
St. Thomas (MN)	78

Sectional semifinals March 11, 1994
Wisconsin–Oshkosh	70
Bethel (MN)	58
Oshkosh, WI
Wisconsin–Eau Claire	83
St. Benedict	82

Sectional finals March 12, 1994
Wisconsin–Oshkosh	57
Wisconsin–Eau Claire	69

=== Final Four ===
Final Four; March 18, 1994
Capital	72
Wheaton (MA)	54
Washington St. Louis	86*
Wisconsin–Eau Claire	82

National championship March 19, 1994
Capital	82
Washington St. Louis	63
Third place
Wheaton (MA)	71
Wisconsin–Eau Claire	107

== All-tournament team ==
- Chris Boos, Wisconsin–Eau Claire
- Carmen Ellis, Capital
- Sarah Goldman, Washington University in St. Louis
- Laura Schmelzer, Capital
- Christine Whelan, Wheaton (MA)

== See also ==
- 1994 NCAA Division III men's basketball tournament
- 1994 NCAA Division I women's basketball tournament
- 1994 NCAA Division II women's basketball tournament
- 1994 NAIA Division I women's basketball tournament
- 1994 NAIA Division II women's basketball tournament
