= 1994 NCAA Division II men's basketball tournament =

- Teams: 48
- Finals site: Springfield Civic Center, Springfield, Massachusetts
- Champions: Bakersfield State Roadrunners (2nd title)
- Runner-up: Southern Indiana Screaming Eagles (1st title game)
- Semifinalists: Washburn Ichabods (1st Final Four); New Hampshire College Penmen (2nd Final Four)
- Winning coach: Pat Douglass (2nd title)
- MOP: Stan Gouard (Southern Indiana)
- Attendance: 35,599

The 1994 NCAA Division II men's basketball tournament involved 48 schools playing in a single-elimination tournament to determine the national champion of men's NCAA Division II college basketball as a culmination of the 1993–94 NCAA Division II men's basketball season. It was won by California State University, Bakersfield and Southern Indiana's Stan Gouard was the Most Outstanding Player.

1994 NCAA Division II Men's sites - regionals (cyan) Elite Eight (red)

== Regional participants ==
School	Outcome
Carson-Newman	First round
Elizabeth City State	Third Place
Longwood	Fourth Place
Mars Hill	First round
Norfolk State	Regional Champion
Virginia Union	Runner-up

School	Outcome
Central Missouri State	Third Place
Missouri Western	First round
North Alabama	Runner-up
Washburn	Regional Champion
West Georgia	First round
West Texas A&M	Fourth Place

School	Outcome
Alaska–Anchorage	Third Place
Cal State Bakersfield	Regional Champion
Grand Canyon	First round
San Francisco State	Fourth Place
Seattle Pacific	First round
UC Riverside	Runner-up

School	Outcome
California (PA)	Runner-up
Edinboro	Fourth Place
Gannon	Third Place
Indiana (PA)	Regional Champion
Millersville	First round
West Chester	First round

School	Outcome
Kentucky Wesleyan	Third Place
Oakland	Fourth Place
Quincy	First round
Saint Joseph's (IN)	First round
Southern Indiana	Regional Champion
Wayne State (MI)	Runner-up

School	Outcome
Denver	First round
Fort Hays State	First round
Mesa State	Fourth Place
North Dakota	Third Place
North Dakota State	Runner-up
South Dakota	Regional Champion

School	Outcome
American International	Fourth Place
C. W. Post	Third Place
Franklin Pierce	First round
New Hampshire College	Regional Champion
Philadelphia U	Runner-up
Saint Anselm	First round

School	Outcome
Alabama A&M	Regional Champion
Eckerd	Fourth Place
Lander	First round
Paine	Third Place
Tampa	Runner-up
Wofford	First round

*denotes tie

== Regionals ==
=== South Atlantic - Fayetteville, North Carolina ===
Location: Felton J. Capel Arena Hosts: Virginia Union University and Fayetteville State University

First round - at higher seed Round of 48; March 8
4	Mars Hill	80
5	Elizabeth City State	88
3	Longwood	76
6	Carson–Newman	63

Regional semifinals Round of 32; March 11
1	Virginia Union	88
5	Elizabeth City State	71
2	Norfolk State	61
3	Longwood	59

Regional Final; Sweet 16; March 12
1	Virginia Union	69
2	Norfolk State	71

- Third Place - Elizabeth City State 88, Longwood 87

=== South Central - Topeka, Kansas ===
Location: Lee Arena Host: Washburn University

First round - at higher seed Round of 48; March 8
4	Central Missouri State	112
5	West Georgia	109
3	West Texas A&M	94
6	Missouri Western	82

Regional semifinals Round of 32; March 11
1	Washburn	83
4	Central Missouri State	78
2	North Alabama	74
3	West Texas A&M	67

Regional Final; Sweet 16; March 12
1	Washburn	92
2	North Alabama	73

- Third Place - Central Missouri State 79, West Texas A&M 74

=== West - Riverside, California ===
Location: UCR Student Recreation Center Host: University of California, Riverside

First round - at higher seed Round of 48; March 8
4	San Francisco State	84*
5	Grand Canyon	79
3	Alaska–Anchorage	83
6	Seattle Pacific	77

Regional semifinals Round of 32; March 11
1	UC Riverside	78
4	San Francisco State	61
2	Cal State Bakersfield	92
3	Alaska–Anchorage	61

Regional Final; Sweet 16; March 12
1	UC Riverside	62
2	Cal State Bakersfield	75

- Third Place - Alaska–Anchorage 109, San Francisco State 97

=== East - California, Pennsylvania ===
Location: Hamer Hall Host: California University of Pennsylvania

First round - at higher seed Round of 48; March 8
4	Gannon	53
5	Millersville	52
3	Edinboro	88
6	West Chester	67

Regional semifinals Round of 32; March 11
1	California (PA)	65
4	Gannon	64
2	Indiana (PA)	90
3	Edinboro	77

Regional Final; Sweet 16; March 12
1	California (PA)	76
2	Indiana (PA)	80

- Third Place - Gannon 75, Edinboro 66

=== Great Lakes - Evansville, Indiana ===
Location: Physical Activities Center Host: University of Southern Indiana

First round - at higher seed Round of 48; March 8
3	Quincy	98
6	Oakland	105
4	Kentucky Wesleyan	56
5	Saint Joseph's (IN)	49

Regional semifinals Round of 32; March 12
2	Wayne State (MI)	99
6	Oakland	97
1	Southern Indiana	78
4	Kentucky Wesleyan	67

Regional Final; Sweet 16; March 13
2	Wayne State (MI)	84
1	Southern Indiana	112

- Third Place - Kentucky Wesleyan 118, Oakland 91

=== North Central - Vermillion, South Dakota ===
Location: DakotaDome Host: University of South Dakota

First round - at higher seed Round of 48; March 8
4	North Dakota	87
5	Fort Hays State	80
3	North Dakota State	87
6	Denver	72

Regional semifinals Round of 32; March 11
1	South Dakota	94
4	North Dakota	76
3	North Dakota State	75*
2	Mesa State	65

Regional Final; Sweet 16; March 12
1	South Dakota	61
3	North Dakota State	58

- Third Place - North Dakota 97, Mesa State 88

=== Northeast - Philadelphia, Pennsylvania ===
Location: Athletics and Recreation Center Host: Philadelphia College of Textiles and Science

First round - at higher seed Round of 48; March 9
4	Franklin Pierce	56
5	C.W. Post	61
3	American International	96
6	Saint Anselm	88

Regional semifinals Round of 32; March 12
1	Philadelphia U	56
5	C.W. Post	54
2	New Hampshire College	90
3	American International	73

Regional Final; Sweet 16; March 13
1	Philadelphia U	78
2	New Hampshire College	79**

- Third Place - C.W. Post 84, American International 81

=== South - Normal, Alabama ===
Location: Elmore Gymnasium Host: Alabama A&M University

First round - at higher seed Round of 48; March 8
4	Lander	83
5	Paine	92
3	Wofford	82
6	Eckerd	94

Regional semifinals Round of 32; March 12
1	Alabama A&M	110**
5	Paine	106
2	Tampa	83
6	Eckerd	61

Regional Final; Sweet 16; March 13
1	Alabama A&M	95
2	Tampa	90

- Third Place - Paine 57, Eckerd 52

*denotes each overtime played

== Elite Eight - Springfield, Massachusetts ==
Location: Springfield Civic Center Hosts: American International College and Springfield College

National Quarterfinals; Elite Eight; March 23
Norfolk State	58
Washburn	69
Cal State Bakersfield	87
Indiana (PA)	69
Southern Indiana	98
South Dakota	77
New Hampshire College	100
Alabama A&M	90

National semifinals Final Four; March 24
Washburn	64
Cal State Bakersfield	67
Southern Indiana	111
New Hampshire College	89

National Championship; March 26
Cal State Bakersfield	92
Southern Indiana	86

*denotes each overtime played

== All-tournament team ==
- Stan Gouard (Southern Indiana)
- Roheen Oats (Cal State Bakersfield)
- Reggie Phillips (Cal State Bakersfield)
- Tyrone Tate (Southern Indiana)
- Kenny Warren (Cal State Bakersfield)

== See also ==
- 1994 NCAA Division II women's basketball tournament
- 1994 NCAA Division I men's basketball tournament
- 1994 NCAA Division III men's basketball tournament
- 1994 NAIA Division I men's basketball tournament
- 1994 NAIA Division II men's basketball tournament
