= 1994 NCAA Division II women's basketball tournament =

American collegiate basketball tournament

- Teams: 48
- Finals site: , Fargo, North Dakota
- Champions: North Dakota State Bison (3rd title)
- Runner-up: Cal State San Bernardino Coyotes (1st title game)
- Third place: North Alabama Lions (1st Final Four)
- Fourth place: Bellarmine Knights (1st Final Four)
- Winning coach: Amy Ruley (3rd title)
- MOP: Darci Steere (North Dakota State)

The 1994 NCAA Division II women's basketball tournament was the 13th annual tournament hosted by the NCAA to determine the national champion of Division II women's collegiate basketball in the United States.

Defending champions North Dakota State defeated Cal State San Bernardino in the championship game, 89–56, to claim the Bison's third NCAA Division II national title. This was North Dakota State's third title in four years and would go on to be the second of four consecutive titles for the Bison.

The championship rounds were contested in Fargo, North Dakota.

== Regionals ==
=== South - Carrollton, Georgia ===
Location: Health and Physical Education Center Host: University of West Georgia

First round - see below Round of 48; March 8
Florida Southern	81
Fort Valley State	68
Lakeland, Florida
North Alabama	88
LeMoyne-Owen	56
Florence, Alabama

Regional semifinals Round of 32; March 11
Florida Southern	74
West Georgia	103
North Alabama	92
Tampa	83

Regional final Sweet 16; March 12
West Georgia	63
North Alabama	64

=== East - Pleasantville, New York ===
Location: Wilcox Hall Gymnasium Host: Pace University

First round - see below Round of 48; March 8
East Stroudsburg	57
Philadelphia Textile	54
East Stroudsburg, Pennsylvania
Mercyhurst	65
California (PA)	64
California, Pennsylvania

Regional semifinals Round of 32; March 12
East Stroudsburg	51
Pace	78
Clarion	87
Mercyhurst	76

Regional final Sweet 16; March 13
Pace	67
Clarion	71

=== North Central - Grand Forks, North Dakota ===
Location: Hyslop Sports Center Host: University of North Dakota

First round - see below Round of 48; March 8
South Dakota State	81
Nebraska-Kearney	68
Brookings, South Dakota
Augustana (SD)	88
Metro State	65
Sioux Falls, South Dakota

Regional semifinals Round of 32; March 11
North Dakota	51
South Dakota State	61
Augustana (SD)	59
North Dakota State	82

Regional final Sweet 16; March 12
South Dakota State	52
North Dakota State	82

=== South Central - St. Joseph, Missouri ===
Location: MWSC Fieldhouse Host: Missouri Western State College

First round - see below Round of 48; March 8
Washburn	85
Abilene Christian	57
Topeka, Kansas
Missouri Southern State	85
New Mexico Highlands	78
Joplin, Missouri

Regional semifinals Round of 32; March 11
Missouri Western State	66
Washburn	62
Angelo State	72
Missouri Southern State	75*

Regional final Sweet 16; March 12
Missouri Western State	75
Missouri Southern State	73

=== West - Portland, Oregon ===
Location: PSU Gymnasium Host: Portland State University

First round - see below Round of 48; March 8
UC Davis	58
Cal Poly Pomona	56
Pomona, California
Eastern Montana	76
Alaska Anchorage	59
Billings, Montana

Regional semifinals Round of 32; March 11
UC Davis	62
Cal State San Bernardino	85
Eastern Montana	54
Portland State	90

Regional final Sweet 16; March 12
Cal State San Bernardino	79
Portland State	69

=== New England - Waltham, Massachusetts ===
Location: Dana Center Host: Bentley College

First round - see below Round of 48; March 9
St. Anselm	79
Bridgeport	67
Manchester, New Hampshire
UMass Lowell	83
Franklin Pierce	70
Rindge, New Hampshire

Regional semifinals Round of 32; March 11
St. Anselm	89
Stonehill	96
Bentley	76
UMass Lowell	63

Regional final Sweet 16; March 12
Stonehill	81
Bentley	64

=== South Atlantic - Wingate, North Carolina ===
Location: Cuddy Arena Host: Wingate College

First round - see below Round of 48; March 9
USC Spartanburg	83
Wofford	70
Spartanburg, South Carolina
Presbyterian	72
Hampton	64
Hampton, Virginia

Regional semifinals Round of 32; March 11
Norfolk State	82
USC Spartanburg	66
Presbyterian	63
Wingate	64

Regional final Sweet 16; March 12
Norfolk State	83*
Wingate	80

=== Great Lakes - Rochester, Michigan ===
Location: Lepley Sports Center Host: Oakland University

First round - see below Round of 48; March 8
Michigan Tech	69
Southern Ill.-Edwardsville	57
Houghton, Michigan
Lake Superior State	79
Northern Kentucky	76
Sault Sainte Marie, Michigan

Regional semifinals Round of 32; March 11
Bellarmine	59
Michigan Tech	54
Lake Superior State	98
Oakland	84

Regional final Sweet 16; March 12
Bellarmine	77
Lake Superior State	74

== Elite Eight - Fargo, North Dakota ==
Location: Bison Sports Arena Host: North Dakota State University

National Quarterfinals; Elite Eight; March 23
North Alabama	75
Clarion	69
North Dakota State	91
Missouri Western State	74
Cal State San Bernardino	82
Stonehill	71
Norfolk State	80
Bellarmine	92

National semifinals Final Four; March 24
North Alabama	56
North Dakota State	123
Cal State San Bernardino	77
Bellarmine	55

National Championship; March 26
North Dakota State	89
Cal State San Bernardino	56
Third place
North Alabama	79
Bellarmine	75

== All-tournament team ==
- Darci Steere, North Dakota State
- Chery’ll Few, Cal State San Bernardino
- Kasey Morlock, North Dakota State
- Jenni Rademacher, North Dakota State
- Kim Young, Cal State San Bernardino

== See also ==
- 1994 NCAA Division II men's basketball tournament
- 1994 NCAA Division I women's basketball tournament
- 1994 NCAA Division III women's basketball tournament
- 1994 NAIA Division I women's basketball tournament
- 1994 NAIA Division II women's basketball tournament
