= Awa Sissoko =

French basketball player (born 1994)

Awa Sissoko (born March 6, 1994, in Paris) is a French basketball player who plays for club USO Mondeville of the League feminine de basket the top league of basketball for women in France.
