= 1994 NAIA Division II men's basketball tournament =

- Teams: 24
- Finals site: Montgomery Fieldhouse; Nampa, Idaho
- Champions: Eureka Red Devils (1st title, 1st title game)
- Runner-up: Northern State Wolves (2nd title game)
- Semifinalists: Lewis & Clark Pioneers; Northwest Nazarene Crusaders
- Charles Stevenson Hustle Award: Emiko Etete (Northwest Nazarene)
- Chuck Taylor MVP: Chris Peterson (Eureka)
- Top scorer: Chris Peterson (Eureka) (107 points)

The 1994 NAIA Division II men's basketball tournament was the tournament held by the NAIA to determine the national champion of men's college basketball among its Division II members in the United States and Canada for the 1993–94 basketball season.

Eureka defeated Northern State (SD) in the championship game, 98–95 in overtime, to claim the Red Devils' first NAIA national title.

The tournament was played at the Montgomery Fieldhouse at Northwest Nazarene University in Nampa, Idaho.

== Qualification ==
The tournament field expanded for the first time, increasing by four teams from twenty to twenty-four teams. The top eight teams remained seeded and were all additionally given a bye into the second round. All other teams, meanwhile, were placed in the preliminary first round.

The tournament continued to utilize a single-elimination format.

== Bracket ==
First round
Jamestown (ND)	66
St. Thomas (FL)	54
Central Methodist	102
Lynn	93
Huron	88
Tarleton State	85
St. Ambrose	68
St. Thomas Aquinas	56
Tabor	67
Black Hills State	61
Ohio Dominican	103
Westbrook	74
Northwest Nazarene	114
Husson	84
McMurry (TX)	71
Lakeland	57

Second round
1	Taylor	71
Jamestown	68
Central Methodist	89
8	Lewis & Clark	106
5	Bethel	74
Huron	78
St. Ambrose	84
4	Northern State (SD)	103
3	Willamette	92
Tabor	61
Ohio Dominican	71
6	Eureka	92
7	Alice Lloyd	88
Northwest Nazarene	105
McMurry (TX)	99
2	Northwestern (IA)	100

Quarterfinals
1	Taylor	60
8	Lewis & Clark	72
Huron	98
4	Northern State (SD)	102
3	Willamette	63
6	Eureka	71
Northwest Nazarene	85
2	Northwestern (IA)	75

Semifinals
8	Lewis & Clark	96
4	Northern State (SD)	106
6	Eureka	83
Northwest Nazarene	67

National championship
4	Northern State (SD)	95
6	Eureka	98*

== See also ==
- 1994 NAIA Division I men's basketball tournament
- 1994 NCAA Division I men's basketball tournament
- 1994 NCAA Division II men's basketball tournament
- 1994 NCAA Division III men's basketball tournament
- 1994 NAIA Division II women's basketball tournament
