= 1994 NCAA Division III men's basketball tournament =

American collegiate men's basketball tournament (1994)

- Teams: 40
- Finals site: , Buffalo, New York
- Champions: Lebanon Valley Flying Dutchmen (1st title)
- Runner-up: NYU Violets (1st title game)
- Semifinalists: Wittenberg Tigers (6th Final Four); St. Thomas (MN) Tommies (1st Final Four)
- Winning coach: Pat Flannery (LVC)
- MOP: Mike Rhoades (LVC); Adam Crawford (NYU)
- Attendance: 40,207

The 1994 NCAA Division III men's basketball tournament was the 20th annual single-elimination tournament to determine the national champions of National Collegiate Athletic Association (NCAA) men's Division III collegiate basketball in the United States.

The field consisted of forty teams, each allocated into one of four sectionals. The national semifinals, third-place final, and championship final were contested in Buffalo, New York.

Lebanon Valley defeated NYU, 66–59 (in overtime), in the final, earning their first national title.

The Flying Dutchmen (28–4) were coached by Pat Flannery.

Future Rice, VCU and Penn State head coach Mike Rhoades, from Lebanon Valley, was one of the co-Most Outstanding Players of the tournament.

== Bracket ==
=== Top left sectional ===
First round
Hunter	79
Montclair State	74
Brockport	72
St. John Fisher	77

Second round
Rowan	70
Hunter	55
Geneseo	55
NYU	67
NJIT	69
Richard Stockton	74
St. John Fisher	72
Albany	84

Sectional semifinals
Rowan	75
NYU	80***
Richard Stockton	54
Albany	60

Sectional finals
NYU	67
Albany	65

=== Bottom left sectional ===
First round
UC San Diego	67
Pomona-Pitzer	66
Hampden-Sydney	91
Oglethorpe	79

Second round
Cal Lutheran	95
UC San Diego	81
Christopher Newport	77
Greensboro	90
Central (IA)	62
St. Thomas (MN)	73
Hampden-Sydney	95
Roanoke	80

Sectional semifinals
Cal Lutheran	99
Greensboro	104
St. Thomas (MN)	80
Hampden-Sydney	66

Sectional finals
Greensboro	74
St. Thomas (MN)	84

=== Top right sectional ===
First round
Cabrini	77
Susquehanna	100
Williams	108
Worcester State	88

Second round
Franklin & Marshall	87
Susquehanna	78
Amherst	80
Colby	77
Johns Hopkins	48
Lebanon Valley	58
Williams	78
UMass Dartmouth	82

Sectional semifinals
Franklin & Marshall	71
Amherst	80
Lebanon Valley	83
UMass Dartmouth	62

Sectional finals
Amherst	79
Lebanon Valley	87

=== Bottom right sectional ===
First round
Cornell College	54
Wisconsin–Platteville	78
Otterbein	71
Washington & Jefferson	73

Second round
Wisconsin–Whitewater	68
Wisconsin–Platteville	76
Calvin	81
Wittenberg	86
Illinois Wesleyan	79
Manchester	77
Washington & Jefferson	75
Kenyon	58

Sectional semifinals
Wisconsin–Platteville	48
Wittenberg	66
Illinois Wesleyan	82
Washington & Jefferson	97

Sectional finals
Wittenberg	91
Washington & Jefferson	65

=== National finals ===
- Site: Buffalo, New York

National Semifinals
NYU	75
St. Thomas (MN)	68
Lebanon Valley	93
Wittenberg	83

National Championship
NYU	59
Lebanon Valley	66*
National Third-place
St. Thomas (MN)	62
Wittenberg	73

== All-tournament team ==
- Mike Rhoades, Lebanon Valley
- Adam Crawford, NYU
- Jonathan Gabriel, NYU
- John Harper, Lebanon Valley
- Matt Croci, Wittenberg

== See also ==
- 1994 NCAA Division III women's basketball tournament
- 1994 NCAA Division I men's basketball tournament
- 1994 NCAA Division II men's basketball tournament
- 1994 NAIA Division I men's basketball tournament
- 1994 NAIA Division II men's basketball tournament
