= 1994 NCAA Division I women's basketball tournament =

American college basketball tournament

- Teams: 64
- Finals site: Richmond Coliseum, Richmond, Virginia
- Champions: North Carolina Tar Heels (1st title, 1st title game, 1st Final Four)
- Runner-up: Louisiana Tech Techsters (5th title game, 8th Final Four)
- Semifinalists: Purdue Boilermakers (1st Final Four); Alabama Crimson Tide (1st Final Four)
- Winning coach: Sylvia Hatchell (1st title)
- MOP: Charlotte Smith (North Carolina)

The 1994 NCAA Division I women's basketball tournament featured 64 teams for the first time ever. The Final Four consisted of North Carolina, Purdue, Louisiana Tech, and Alabama, with North Carolina defeating Louisiana Tech 60–59 to win its first NCAA title on a 3-point shot by Charlotte Smith as time expired. The ball was inbounded with only 00:00.7 left on the clock, making it one of the most exciting finishes in tournament history.

== Notable events ==
The Alabama team was a six seed in the Midwest region. After beating the 11 seed Oregon State, they faced a higher seed, Iowa, who were seeded third in the region. Alabama won that game, and went on to face another higher seed in Texas Tech, the defending national champions. Alabama won again, and went on to face Penn State, the top seed in the region. Alabama won yet again, this time by 14 points, to advance to their first final Four.

In the semi-final game of the Final Four, they faced Louisiana Tech, a team they had played earlier in the year. In their December match-up, Alabama had beaten the Lady Techsters by 22 points, 99–77. In this game La tech opened up a six-point lead at the half. Alabama's All-American guard Niesa Johnson cut her hand on a locker room sink, which required seven stitches. Because it was such an important game, Johnson was bandaged and medicated and returned to the game. The Alabama team fought back from an eleven-point deficit and cut the margin to two points with seconds to play. The plan was to get the ball to Betsy Harris to attempt a three-point play, but Harris stepped out of bounds. After a made free throw, they had one more chance with a three-point attempt but it failed, and La Tech moved on to the championship game.

In the other semifinal game, the North Carolina team faced Purdue. North Carolina's Charlotte Smith was expected to be an important key to the game, and the Purdue coach, Lin Dunn, tried to prepare the team to handle Smith. That planning was ineffective, as Smith scored 23 points, and set a personal career records for assists with eight. The Purdue team was down 13 points in the first half, but fought back and managed to take a two-point lead in the second half. However, the Tar Heels switched to a zone defense after made baskets, and retook the lead, ending up with an 89–74 victory, and the first North Carolina team to make it to the Championship game.

In addition to Charlotte Smith, North Carolina had a freshman guard Marion Jones who would later be known for world class performances in track and field. Jones picked up her third foul only six minutes in the game and had to sit. This "rattled" the North Carolina team but they kept the game close. When the game drew to a close, the La Tech team had a two-point advantage with less than a second on the clock, but North Carolina had the ball. With 0.7 seconds left, there was just enough time to catch and shoot. The ball was inbounded to Charlotte Smith who had made only eight three-pointers on 31 attempts during the season. Smith launched the ball, but never saw what happened as her vision was blocked. Her teammates mobbed her, and she realized she had hit the shot to complete one of the most dramatic finishes in NCAA Championship history. North Carolina won the Championship 60–59.

== Tournament records ==
- Rebounds - Charlotte Smith recorded 23 rebounds in the championship game between North Carolina and Louisiana Tech, the most number of rebounds recorded in a Final Four game. The result is also a tie for the most number of rebounds in an NCAA tournament game.
- Winning Margin - Tennessee beat North Carolina A&T by a score of 111–37. The 74 point margin is the largest ever record in an NCAA tournament game.
- Three-point field goals - Betsy Harris scored 20 three-point attempts in the tournament, tied for the most ever scored in a complete tournament. Harris scored the baskets in five games, while the two other record holders, Diana Taurasi and Maya Moore, accomplished the feat in six games.

== Qualifying teams – automatic ==
Sixty-four teams were selected to participate in the 1994 NCAA Tournament. Thirty-two conferences were eligible for an automatic bid to the 1994 NCAA tournament.

Automatic bids
| | | Record | | |
| Qualifying school | Conference | Regular season | Conference | Seed |
|---|---|---|---|---|
| Bowling Green State University | MAC | 26–3 | 17–1 | 7 |
| Brown University | Ivy League | 18–9 | 11–3 | 16 |
| University of Connecticut | Big East | 27–2 | 17–1 | 1 |
| Florida International University | Trans America | 25–3 | 11–1 | 8 |
| Fordham University | Patriot League | 21–8 | 11–3 | 16 |
| Georgia Southern University | Southern Conference | 21–8 | 11–2 | 14 |
| Grambling State University | SWAC | 23–6 | 11–3 | 15 |
| University of Wisconsin–Green Bay | Mid-Continent | 18–10 | 13–5 | 15 |
| Louisiana Tech University | Sun Belt Conference | 26–3 | 14–0 | 4 |
| Loyola University Maryland | MAAC | 18–10 | 12–2 | 14 |
| University of Missouri | Big Eight | 12–17 | 3–11 | 15 |
| Missouri State University | Missouri Valley Conference | 23–5 | 15–1 | 6 |
| University of Montana | Big Sky Conference | 24–4 | 12–2 | 7 |
| Mount St. Mary's University | Northeast Conference | 25–3 | 18–0 | 14 |
| NC A&T | MEAC | 19–10 | 11–5 | 16 |
| University of North Carolina | ACC | 27–2 | 14–2 | 3 |
| University of Notre Dame | Midwestern Collegiate | 22–6 | 10–2 | 7 |
| Old Dominion University | Colonial | 24–5 | 14–0 | 6 |
| Pennsylvania State University | Big Ten | 25–2 | 16–2 | 1 |
| University of Portland | West Coast Conference | 17–11 | 7–7 | 15 |
| Radford University | Big South Conference | 18–11 | 12–6 | 16 |
| Rutgers University | Atlantic 10 | 22–7 | 13–3 | 5 |
| San Diego State University | WAC | 25–4 | 13–1 | 5 |
| University of Southern California | Pac-10 | 23–3 | 16–2 | 2 |
| Stephen F. Austin State University | Southland | 23–6 | 16–2 | 8 |
| University of Tennessee | SEC | 29–1 | 11–0 | 1 |
| Tennessee State University | Ohio Valley Conference | 20–8 | 13–3 | 13 |
| University of Texas at Austin | Southwest | 21–8 | 10–4 | 5 |
| University of Alabama at Birmingham | Great Midwest | 23–5 | 12–0 | 10 |
| University of Nevada, Las Vegas | Big West Conference | 23–6 | 14–4 | 10 |
| University of Vermont | North Atlantic Conference | 19–10 | 9–5 | 13 |
| Virginia Tech | Metro | 24–5 | 9–3 | 8 |

== Qualifying teams – at-large ==
Thirty-two additional teams were selected to complete the sixty-four invitations.

At-large bids
| | | Record | | |
| Qualifying school | Conference | Regular season | Conference | Seed |
|---|---|---|---|---|
| University of Alabama | Southeastern | 22–6 | 7–4 | 6 |
| Auburn University | Southeastern | 19–9 | 6–5 | 9 |
| Boise State University | Big Sky | 23–5 | 12–2 | 9 |
| Clemson University | Atlantic Coast | 19–9 | 11–5 | 9 |
| University of Colorado at Boulder | Big Eight | 25–4 | 12–2 | 3 |
| Creighton University | Missouri Valley | 23–6 | 14–2 | 10 |
| University of Florida | Southeastern | 22–6 | 8–3 | 4 |
| The George Washington University | Atlantic 10 | 22–7 | 13–3 | 7 |
| University of Hawaiʻi at Mānoa | Big West | 25–4 | 16–2 | 12 |
| Indiana University | Big Ten | 19–8 | 10–8 | 12 |
| University of Iowa | Big Ten | 20–6 | 13–5 | 3 |
| University of Kansas | Big Eight | 21–5 | 11–3 | 9 |
| Marquette University | Great Midwest | 22–6 | 10–2 | 14 |
| University of Minnesota | Big Ten | 17–10 | 10–8 | 10 |
| University of Mississippi (Ole Miss) | Southeastern | 23–8 | 7–4 | 5 |
| Northern Illinois University | Mid-Continent | 24–5 | 18–0 | 11 |
| Oklahoma State University–Stillwater | Big Eight | 20–8 | 9–5 | 12 |
| University of Oregon | Pacific-10 | 19–8 | 13–5 | 6 |
| Oregon State University | Pacific-10 | 17–10 | 9–9 | 11 |
| Purdue University | Big Ten | 25–4 | 16–2 | 1 |
| Santa Clara University | West Coast | 21–6 | 11–3 | 11 |
| Seton Hall University | Big East | 25–4 | 16–2 | 4 |
| Southern Methodist University | Southwest | 18–8 | 8–6 | 13 |
| University of Southern Mississippi | Metro | 24–4 | 10–2 | 4 |
| Saint Joseph's University | Atlantic 10 | 19–8 | 11–5 | 11 |
| Stanford University | Pacific-10 | 22–5 | 15–3 | 2 |
| Texas A&M University | Southwest | 21–7 | 11–3 | 13 |
| Texas Tech University | Southwest | 26–4 | 12–2 | 2 |
| Vanderbilt University | Southeastern | 23–7 | 9–2 | 2 |
| University of Virginia | Atlantic Coast | 25–4 | 15–1 | 3 |
| University of Washington | Pacific-10 | 20–7 | 12–6 | 8 |
| Western Kentucky University | Sun Belt | 23–9 | 11–3 | 12 |

== Bids by conference ==
Thirty-two conferences earned an automatic bid. In sixteen cases, the automatic bid was the only representative from the conference. Thirty-two additional at-large teams were selected from sixteen of the conferences.

| Bids | Conference | Teams |
| 6 | Southeastern | Tennessee, Alabama, Auburn, Florida, Ole Miss, Vanderbilt |
| 5 | Big Ten | Penn St., Indiana, Iowa, Minnesota, Purdue |
| 5 | Pacific-10 | Southern California, Oregon, Oregon St., Stanford, Washington |
| 4 | Big Eight | Missouri, Colorado, Kansas, Oklahoma St. |
| 4 | Southwest | Texas, SMU, Texas A&M, Texas Tech |
| 3 | Atlantic 10 | Rutgers, George Washington, St. Joseph's |
| 3 | Atlantic Coast | North Carolina, Clemson, Virginia |
| 2 | Big East | Connecticut, Seton Hall |
| 2 | Big Sky | Montana, Boise St. |
| 2 | Big West | UNLV, Hawaii |
| 2 | Great Midwest | UAB, Marquette |
| 2 | Metro | Virginia Tech, Southern Miss. |
| 2 | Mid-Continent | Green Bay, Northern Ill. |
| 2 | Missouri Valley | Missouri St., Creighton |
| 2 | Sun Belt | Louisiana Tech, Western Ky. |
| 2 | West Coast | Portland, Santa Clara |
| 1 | Big South | Radford |
| 1 | Colonial | Old Dominion |
| 1 | Ivy | Brown |
| 1 | Metro Atlantic | Loyola Md. |
| 1 | Mid-American | Bowling Green |
| 1 | Mid-Eastern | N.C. A&T |
| 1 | Midwestern | Notre Dame |
| 1 | North Atlantic | Vermont |
| 1 | Northeast | Mt. St. Mary's |
| 1 | Ohio Valley | Tennessee St. |
| 1 | Patriot | Fordham |
| 1 | Southern | Ga. Southern |
| 1 | Southland | Stephen F. Austin |
| 1 | Southwestern | Grambling |
| 1 | Trans America | FIU |
| 1 | Western Athletic | San Diego St. |

== Bids by state ==
The sixty-four teams came from thirty-six states, plus Washington, D.C. Texas had the most teams with five bids. Fourteen states did not have any teams receiving bids.

NCAA women's basketball tournament invitations by state 1994

| Bids | State | Teams |
|---|---|---|
| 5 | Texas | Stephen F. Austin, Texas, SMU, Texas A&M, Texas Tech |
| 4 | California | San Diego State, Southern California, Santa Clara, Stanford |
| 4 | Virginia | Old Dominion, Radford, Virginia, Virginia Tech |
| 3 | Alabama | UAB, Alabama, Auburn |
| 3 | Indiana | Notre Dame, Indiana, Purdue |
| 3 | Oregon | Portland, Oregon, Oregon State |
| 3 | Tennessee | Tennessee, Tennessee State, Vanderbilt |
| 2 | Florida | Florida, Florida International |
| 2 | Louisiana | Grambling, Louisiana Tech |
| 2 | Maryland | Loyola Md., Mount St. Mary's |
| 2 | Mississippi | Ole Miss, Southern Mississippi |
| 2 | Missouri | Missouri, Missouri State |
| 2 | New Jersey | Rutgers, Seton Hall |
| 2 | North Carolina | North Carolina A&T, North Carolina |
| 2 | Pennsylvania | Penn State, St. Joseph's |
| 2 | Wisconsin | Green Bay, Marquette |
| 1 | Colorado | Colorado |
| 1 | Connecticut | Connecticut |
| 1 | District of Columbia | George Washington |
| 1 | Georgia | Georgia Southern |
| 1 | Hawaii | Hawaii |
| 1 | Idaho | Boise State |
| 1 | Illinois | Northern Illinois |
| 1 | Iowa | Iowa |
| 1 | Kansas | Kansas |
| 1 | Kentucky | Western Kentucky |
| 1 | Minnesota | Minnesota |
| 1 | Montana | Montana |
| 1 | Nebraska | Creighton |
| 1 | Nevada | UNLV |
| 1 | New York | Fordham |
| 1 | Ohio | Bowling Green |
| 1 | Oklahoma | Oklahoma State |
| 1 | Rhode Island | Brown |
| 1 | South Carolina | Clemson |
| 1 | Vermont | Vermont |
| 1 | Washington | Washington |

== Brackets ==
First- and second-round games played at higher seed except where noted.

=== East Region ===
First round
March 13 and 14

Higher seed's home court

Second round
March 15 and 16

Higher seed's home court

Regional semifinals
March 21

Piscataway, NJ

Regional finals
March 23

Piscataway, NJ

1
Connecticut
79

16
Brown
60

1
Connecticut
81

9
Auburn
59

8
Virginia Tech
51

9
Auburn
60

1
Connecticut
78

4
Southern Mississippi
64

5
Rutgers
73

12
Western Kentucky
84

12
Western Kentucky
69

4
Southern Mississippi
72

4
Southern Mississippi
86

13
Tennessee State
72

1
Connecticut
69

3
North Carolina
81

6
Old Dominion
56

11
Saint Joseph's
55

6
Old Dominion
52

3
North Carolina
63

3
North Carolina
101

14
Georgia Southern
53

3
North Carolina
73

2
Vanderbilt
69

7
Notre Dame
76

10
Minnesota
81

10
Minnesota
72

2
Vanderbilt
98

2
Vanderbilt
95

15
Grambling State
85

=== West Region ===
First round
March 16

Higher seed's home court

Second round
March 19 and 20

Higher seed's home court

Regional semifinals
March 24

Stanford, CA

Regional finals
March 26

Stanford, CA

1
Purdue
103

16
Radford
56

1
Purdue
86

8
Washington
59

8
Washington
89

9
Boise State
61

1
Purdue
82

13
Texas A&M
56

5
San Diego State
81

12
Hawaiʻi
75

5
San Diego State
72

13
Texas A&M
75

4
Florida
76

13
at Texas A&M
78

1
Purdue
82

2
Stanford
65

6
Oregon
74

11
Santa Clara
59

6
Oregon
71

3
Colorado
92

3
Colorado
77

14
Marquette
74

3
Colorado
62

2
Stanford
78

7
Montana
77

10
UNLV
67

7
Montana
62

2
Stanford
66

2
Stanford
81

15
Green Bay
56

=== Mideast Region ===
First round
March 12 and 13

Higher seed's home court

Second round
March 14 and 15

Higher seed's home court

Regional semifinals
March 21

Fayetteville, AR

Regional finals
March 23

Fayetteville, AR

1
Tennessee
111

16
North Carolina A&T
37

1
Tennessee
78

9
Clemson
66

8
Florida International
64

9
Clemson
65

1
Tennessee
68

4
Louisiana Tech
71

5
Ole Miss
83

12
Indiana
61

5
Ole Miss
67

4
Louisiana Tech
82

4
Louisiana Tech
96

13
SMU
62

4
Louisiana Tech
75

2
USC
66

6
SW Missouri State
75

11
Northern Illinois
56

6
SW Missouri State
63

3
Virginia
67

3
Virginia
72

14
Loyola (Md)
47

3
Virginia
66

2
USC
85

7
George Washington
74

10
UAB
66

7
George Washington
72

2
USC
76

2
USC
77

15
Portland
62

=== Midwest Region ===
First round
March 12 and 13

Higher seed's home court

Second round
March 14 and 15

Higher seed's home court

Regional semifinals
March 20

Austin, Texas

Regional finals
March 22

Austin, Texas

1
Penn State
94

16
Fordham
41

1
Penn State
85

9
Kansas
68

8
Stephen F. Austin
62

9
Kansas
72

1
Penn State
64

4
Seton Hall
60

5
Texas
75

12
Oklahoma State
67

5
Texas
66

4
Seton Hall
71

4
Seton Hall
70

13
Vermont
60

1
Penn State
82

6
Alabama
96

6
Alabama
96

11
Oregon State
86

6
Alabama
84

3
Iowa
78

3
Iowa
70

14
Mount St. Mary's
47

6
Alabama
73

2
Texas Tech
68

7
Bowling Green
73

10
Creighton
84

10
Creighton
65

2
Texas Tech
75

2
Texas Tech
75

15
Missouri
61

=== Final Four – Richmond, Virginia ===
National semifinals April 2
3E | North Carolina | 89
1W | Purdue | 74
4ME | Louisiana Tech | 69
6MW | Alabama | 66

National championship April 3
3E | North Carolina | 60
4ME | Louisiana Tech | 59

E-East; ME-Mideast; MW-Midwest; W-West.

== Record by conference ==
Eighteen conferences had more than one bid, or at least one win in NCAA Tournament play:

| Conference | # of Bids | Record | Win % | Round of 32 | Sweet Sixteen | Elite Eight | Final Four | Championship Game |
|---|---|---|---|---|---|---|---|---|
| Southeastern | 6 | 10–6 | .625 | 5 | 3 | 1 | 1 | – |
| Big Ten | 5 | 9–5 | .643 | 4 | 2 | 2 | 1 | – |
| Pacific-10 | 5 | 8–5 | .615 | 4 | 2 | 2 | – | – |
| Southwest | 4 | 5–4 | .556 | 3 | 2 | – | – | – |
| Big Eight | 4 | 3–4 | .429 | 2 | 1 | – | – | – |
| Atlantic Coast | 3 | 9–2 | .818 | 3 | 2 | 1 | 1 | 1 |
| Atlantic 10 | 3 | 1–3 | .250 | 1 | – | – | – | – |
| Sun Belt | 2 | 6–2 | .750 | 2 | 1 | 1 | 1 | 1 |
| Big East | 2 | 5–2 | .714 | 2 | 2 | 1 | – | – |
| Metro | 2 | 2–2 | .500 | 1 | 1 | – | – | – |
| Missouri Valley | 2 | 2–2 | .500 | 2 | – | – | – | – |
| Big Sky | 2 | 1–2 | .333 | 1 | – | – | – | – |
| Big West | 2 | 0–2 | – | – | – | – | – | – |
| Great Midwest | 2 | 0–2 | – | – | – | – | – | – |
| Mid-Continent | 2 | 0–2 | – | – | – | – | – | – |
| West Coast | 2 | 0–2 | – | – | – | – | – | – |
| Colonial | 1 | 1–1 | .500 | 1 | – | – | – | – |
| Western Athletic | 1 | 1–1 | .500 | 1 | – | – | – | – |

Fourteen conferences went 0-1: Big South Conference, Ivy League, MAAC, MAC, MEAC, Midwestern Collegiate, North Atlantic Conference, Northeast Conference, Ohio Valley Conference, Patriot League, Southern Conference, Southland, SWAC, and Trans America.

== All-Tournament team ==
- Charlotte Smith, North Carolina
- Tonya Sampson, North Carolina
- Vickie Johnson, Louisiana Tech
- Pam Thomas, Louisiana Tech
- Betsy Harris, Alabama

== Game officials ==
- Dee Kantner (semifinal)
- Violet Palmer (semifinal)
- Sally Bell (semifinal)
- Sidney Bunch (semifinal)
- June Courteau (final)
- John Morningstar (final)

== See also ==
- 1994 NCAA Division I men's basketball tournament
- 1994 NCAA Division II women's basketball tournament
- 1994 NCAA Division III women's basketball tournament
- 1994 NAIA Division I women's basketball tournament
- 1994 NAIA Division II women's basketball tournament
