= 1999 WNBA draft =

Basketball player selection

General information
- Sport: Basketball
- Date: May 4, 1999

Overview
- League: WNBA
- Expansion teams: Minnesota Lynx; Orlando Miracle
- First selection: Chamique Holdsclaw; Washington Mystics

1999 WNBA draft

- On September 15, 1998, two players were allocated prior to the expansion draft.
- On April 6, 1999, a WNBA expansion draft took place for the Minnesota Lynx and the Orlando Miracle.
- On May 3, 1999, another round of player allocation took place.
- On May 4, 1999, the regular WNBA draft took place.

In December 1998, the American Basketball League (ABL) folded. The 90 players from the ABL's eight teams (except Kristin Folkl and Nykesha Sales who were allocated to the new WNBA expansion teams by the WNBA) were eligible for this draft.

== Draft ==
!	Denotes player who has been inducted to the Naismith Basketball Hall of Fame
^	Denotes player who has been inducted to the Women's Basketball Hall of Fame
*	Denotes player who has been selected for at least one All-Star Game and All-WNBA Team
^{+}	Denotes player who has been selected for at least one All-Star Game
^{#}	Denotes player who never played in the WNBA regular season or playoffs
**Bold**	Denotes player who won Rookie of the Year

=== Round 1 ===
Pick	Player	Position	Nationality	Team	School / club team
1	**Chamique Holdsclaw** * ^ !	G/F	United States	Washington Mystics	Tennessee
2	Yolanda Griffith * ^ !	F/C	United States	Sacramento Monarchs	Florida Atlantic (from Chicago Condors, ABL)
3	Natalie Williams * ^	C	United States	Utah Starzz	UCLA (from Portland Power, ABL)
4	DeLisha Milton ^{+} ^	F	United States	Los Angeles Sparks	Florida (from Portland Power, ABL)
5	Jennifer Azzi ^	G	United States	Detroit Shock	Stanford (from San Jose Lasers, ABL)
6	Crystal Robinson	F	United States	New York Liberty	Southeastern Oklahoma State (from Colorado Xplosion, ABL)
7	Tonya Edwards ^{+}	G	United States	Minnesota Lynx	Tennessee (from Columbus Quest, ABL)
8	Tari Phillips *	F	United States	Orlando Miracle	Central Florida (from Colorado Xplosion, ABL)
9	Dawn Staley ^{+} ^ !	G	United States	Charlotte Sting	Virginia (from Philadelphia Rage, ABL)
10	Edna Campbell	G	United States	Phoenix Mercury	Texas (from Colorado Xplosion, ABL)
11	Chasity Melvin ^{+}	C	United States	Cleveland Rockers	North Carolina State (from Philadelphia Rage, ABL)
12	Natalia Zasulskaya #	F	Russia	Houston Comets	Dynamo Moscow, Russia

=== Round 2 ===
Pick	Player	Position	Nationality	Team	School / club team
13	Shalonda Enis	F	United States	Washington Mystics	Alabama (from Seattle Reign, ABL)
14	Kedra Holland-Corn	G	United States	Sacramento Monarchs	Georgia (from San Jose Lasers, ABL)
15	Debbie Black	G	United States	Utah Starzz	St. Joseph's (from Colorado Xplosion, ABL)
16	Clarisse Machanguana	C	Mozambique	Los Angeles Sparks	Old Dominion (from San Jose Lasers, ABL)
17	Val Whiting	C	United States	Detroit Shock	Stanford (from Seattle Reign, ABL)
18	Michele Van Gorp	C	United States	New York Liberty	Duke
19	Trisha Fallon	G/F	Australia	Minnesota Lynx	Sydney Flames, Australia
20	Sheri Sam ^{+}	F/G	United States	Orlando Miracle	Vanderbilt (from San Jose Lasers, ABL)
21	Stephanie White	G/F	United States	Charlotte Sting	Purdue
22	Clarissa Davis-Wrightsil ^	F	United States	Phoenix Mercury	Texas (from San Jose Lasers, ABL)
23	Mery Andrade	F	Portugal	Cleveland Rockers	Old Dominion
24	Sonja Henning	G	United States	Houston Comets	Stanford (from Portland Power, ABL)

=== Round 3 ===
Pick	Player	Position	Nationality	Team	School / club team
25	Andrea Nagy	G	Hungary	Washington Mystics	Florida International (from Philadelphia Rage, ABL)
26	Kate Starbird	G	United States	Sacramento Monarchs	Stanford (from Seattle Reign, ABL)
27	Adrienne Goodson ^{+}	F	United States	Utah Starzz	Old Dominion (from Chicago Condors, ABL)
28	Ukari Figgs	G	United States	Los Angeles Sparks	Purdue
29	Dominique Canty	G/F	United States	Detroit Shock	Alabama
30	Tamika Whitmore ^{+}	C	United States	New York Liberty	Memphis
31	Andrea Lloyd ^	F	United States	Minnesota Lynx	Texas (from Columbus Quest, ABL)
32	Taj McWilliams-Franklin (Note: Taj McWilliams-Franklin is the lowest draft pick to be named a WNBA All-Star.) * ^	C	United States	Orlando Miracle	St. Edward's (from Philadelphia Rage, ABL)
33	Charlotte Smith	F	United States	Charlotte Sting	North Carolina (from San Jose Lasers, ABL)
34	Lisa Harrison	F	United States	Phoenix Mercury	Tennessee (from Columbus Quest, ABL)
35	Tracy Henderson	C	United States	Cleveland Rockers	Georgia (from Nashville Noise, ABL)
36	Kara Wolters ^	C	United States	Houston Comets	Connecticut (from New England Blizzard, ABL)

=== Round 4 ===
Pick	Player	Position	Nationality	Team	School / club team
37	Jenny Whittle	C	Australia	Washington Mystics	Perth Breakers, Australia
38	Amy Herrig	C	United States	Sacramento Monarchs	Iowa
39	Dalma Ivanyi	G	Hungary	Utah Starzz	Florida International
40	La'Keshia Frett	F	United States	Los Angeles Sparks	Georgia (from Philadelphia Rage, ABL)
41	Astou Ndiaye	F/C	Senegal	Detroit Shock	Southern Nazarene (from Seattle Reign, ABL)
42	Carolyn Jones-Young	G	United States	New York Liberty	Auburn (from New England Blizzard, ABL)
43	Sonja Tate	G	United States	Minnesota Lynx	Arkansas State (from Columbus Quest, ABL)
44	Carla McGhee	F	United States	Orlando Miracle	Tennessee (from Columbus Quest, ABL)
45	Angie Braziel	F	United States	Charlotte Sting	Texas Tech
46	Amanda Wilson	F	United States	Phoenix Mercury	Louisiana Tech
47	Kellie Jolly	G	United States	Cleveland Rockers	Tennessee
48	Jennifer Rizzotti ^	G	United States	Houston Comets	Connecticut (from New England Blizzard, ABL)
49	Angie Potthoff	F	United States	Minnesota Lynx	Penn State (from Columbus Quest, ABL)
50	Elaine Powell	G	United States	Orlando Miracle	LSU (from Portland Power, ABL)

== See also ==
- List of first overall WNBA draft picks
