= American Basketball League (1996–1998) on television =

The American Basketball League was the first independent professional basketball league for women in the United States. The ABL lasted two full seasons: 1996–97 and 1997–98. On December 22, 1998; with almost no warning, the ABL declared Chapter 11 bankruptcy and suspended operations. Each team had played between 12 and 15 games of the 1998–99 season.

== Television package ==
Ultimately, the ABL never did land a major TV contract. None of the ABL games were broadcast nationally or on prime television channels for basketball.

=== SportsChannel ===
When the ABL began operations in 1996, its games were carried by the SportsChannel regional networks and Black Entertainment Television (BET) under a two-year contract. SportsChannel would televise 12 games on Sunday nights while BET would televise only 8 games on Saturday nights. SportsChannel televised the San Jose Lasers' opening game on Friday, October 25, 1996 and would televise their January 5 game against the Richmond Rage.

=== BET ===
BET initially would televise eight Saturday night games, starting with the New England Blizzard at the Columbus Quest on January 4, 1997 and ending with a playoff semifinal February 22. New England home games on January 25 and February 15 would also be shown during the 1996–97 season.

Come the second year, the ABL's television package included 36 games combined on Fox Sports Net and BET.

During 1997, the ABL averaged a 0.6 rating while rival league, the Women's National Basketball Association (WNBA) scored nearly a 2 rating on NBC. A rating point is equal to 980,000 TV households. Besides NBC's weekly game, ESPN and the Lifetime channel also each got a weekly WNBA game. That's a total weekly exposure of 130 million homes, more than double the 66 million the ABL reached on SportsChannel and BET.

BET was scheduled to televise 12 games on Saturday nights. After broadcasting four games in December 1997, the remaining eight would be aired starting on January 4 and the following Saturdays through February. The ABL's revenue came solely from the BET. In comparison, the WNBA (as previously mentioned) boasted major television deals with NBC, ESPN, and the Lifetime cable network. BET would use the games to build a lead-in audience for reruns of 227.

=== Fox Sports Net ===
When league officials were negotiating with Fox Sports Net, it was in revision of a contract that the league signed with Fox Sports Net's forerunner, Prime Network. The ABL games were often broadcast on tape delay on BET and Fox Sports Net.

All the while, the ABL had paid a fee to have two games of its championship series aired on CBS had the 1998–99 season been played in full and 16 games on Fox Sports Net, which at the time consisted of 22 regional sports cable channels, up to seven playoff games, including all of the best-of-5 ABL championship series.

Fox Sports Net's primary broadcast team included Tracy Warren (play-by-play), Debbie Antonelli (color commentary), and Heather Cox (sideline reporter). Also utilized by Fox Sports Net were Ron Barr (play-by-play) and Debbie Gore (color commentary).
