= Tracy Henderson =

American basketball player

Personal information
- Born: December 31, 1974 (age 51)
- Listed height: 6 ft 3 in (1.91 m)
- Listed weight: 200 lb (91 kg)

Career information
- College: Georgia (1993–1997)
- WNBA draft: 1999: 3rd round, 35th overall pick
- Drafted by: Cleveland Rockers
- Position: Center
- Number: 47

Career history
- 1997–1998: Atlanta Glory
- 1998: Nashville Noise
- 1999, 2002–2003: Cleveland Rockers

Career highlights
- First-team All-SEC (1997); SEC All-Freshman Team (1994)
- Stats at Basketball Reference

Tracy Henderson (born December 31, 1974) is a former professional basketball player. She played four seasons with University of Georgia, two seasons in the American Basketball League, and three seasons in the Women's National Basketball Association.

== College ==
Henderson played for the Lady Bulldogs from 1993 to 1997. During that time, she helped lead them to two consecutive NCAA Final Four appearances. She also helped lead them to SEC championships during her final two years. In 1997, she was ranked in University of Georgia's top 10 all-time leaders in scoring, rebounding, field goal percentage, and blocks.

=== Georgia statistics ===
Legend
GP	Games played	GS	Games started	MPG	Minutes per game
FG%	Field goal percentage	3P%	3-point field goal percentage	FT%	Free throw percentage
RPG	Rebounds per game	APG	Assists per game	SPG	Steals per game
BPG	Blocks per game	PPG	Points per game	**Bold**	Career high

Year	Team	GP	Points	FG%	FT%	RPG	APG	SPG	BPG	PPG
94	Georgia	28	349	51.2%	53.5%	6.2	0.3	0.6	2.1	12.5
95	Georgia	**33**	**510**	54.9%	57.6%	**7.6**	0.4	**1.2**	**2.5**	**15.5**
96	Georgia	**33**	466	**57.9%**	63.3%	6.4	0.7	0.8	2.2	14.1
97	Georgia	28	439	54.7%	**69.4%**	6.6	**1.0**	1.0	1.9	15.7
Career		122	1764	54.9%	60.8%	6.7	0.6	0.9	2.2	14.5

== WNBA ==
Henderson played a total of 61 games and 526 minutes. She missed the entire 2000 WNBA season due to pregnancy and the entire 2001 WNBA season due to knee rehabilitation. She retired in 2004.

=== WNBA career statistics ===
Legend
GP	Games played	GS	Games started	MPG	Minutes per game	RPG	Rebounds per game
APG	Assists per game	SPG	Steals per game	BPG	Blocks per game	PPG	Points per game
TO	Turnovers per game	FG%	Field-goal percentage	3P%	3-point field-goal percentage	FT%	Free-throw percentage
**Bold**	Career best	°	League leader

=== Regular season ===
Year	Team	GP	GS	MPG	FG%	3P%	FT%	RPG	APG	SPG	BPG	TO	PPG
1999	Cleveland	**27**	0	**11.4**	31.0	0.0	58.6	**2.9**	0.3	**0.3**	**0.7**	0.9	**2.6**
2002	Cleveland	23	0	7.5	**39.0**	0.0	**100.0**	1.5	0.1	0.1	0.3	0.8	1.5
2002	Cleveland	11	0	4.1	7.7	0.0	0.0	1.3	0.3	0.1	0.1	**0.4**	0.2
Career	3 years, 1 team	61	0	8.6	31.2	0.0	62.5	2.1	0.2	0.2	0.5	0.8	1.8

=== Playoffs ===
Year	Team	GP	GS	MPG	FG%	3P%	FT%	RPG	APG	SPG	BPG	TO	PPG
2002	Cleveland	1	0	3.0	100.0	0.0	0.0	1.0	0.0	0.0	0.0	0.0	2.0
Career	1 year, 1 team	1	0	3.0	100.0	0.0	0.0	1.0	0.0	0.0	0.0	0.0	2.0

== Personal life ==
Henderson has three children with Robert Edwards.

== Honors and awards ==
- 3x First-team All-SEC (1995–97)
- 2x honorable mention All-American
