= Molly Goodenbour =

American basketball player and coach

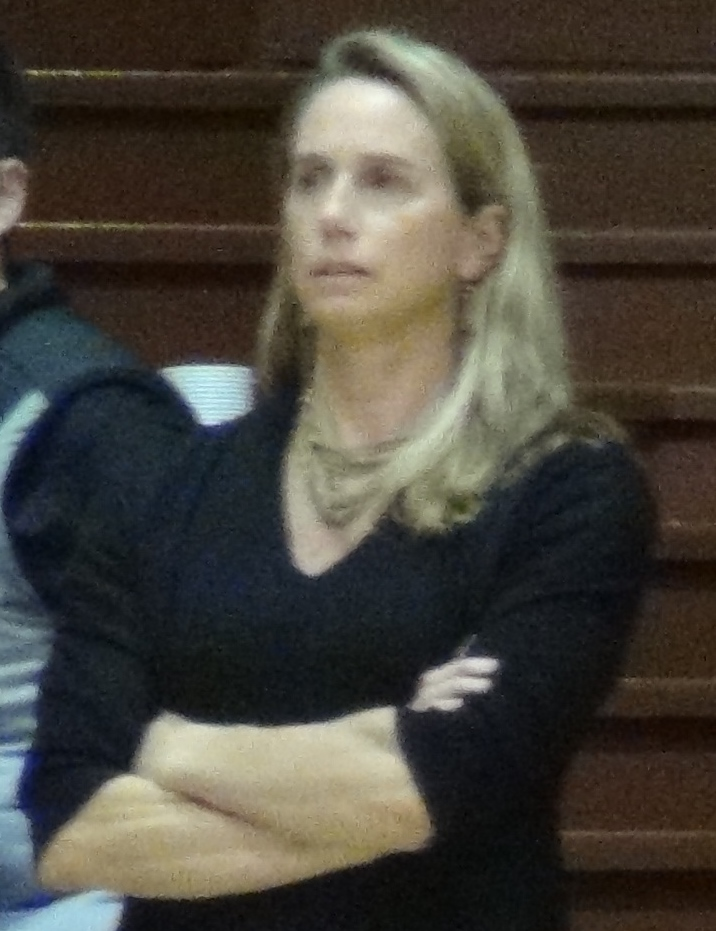
- Goodenbour at Kezar Pavilion in 2016.

San Francisco Dons
- Title: Head coach
- League: West Coast Conference

Personal information
- Born: February 8, 1972 (age 54) Waterloo, Iowa, U.S.

Career information
- High school: Waterloo West (Waterloo, Iowa)
- College: Stanford (1989–1993)
- WNBA draft: 2000: Expansion round, 20th overall pick
- Drafted by: Portland Fire
- Playing career: 1995–2000
- Position: Guard
- Coaching career: 1994–present

Career history

Playing
- 1995–1996: Linkspring
- 1996–1997: Richmond Rage
- 1997–1998: Portland Power

Coaching
- 1994–1995: San Francisco (asst.)
- 2002–2003: Santa Rosa JC (assoc. HC)
- 2003–2005: Santa Rosa JC
- 2005–2006: San Francisco (asst.)
- 2006–2008: Chico State
- 2008–2012: UC Irvine
- 2012–2016: Cal State Dominguez Hills
- 2016–present: San Francisco

Career highlights
- As player: All Pac-10 (1993); NCAA Tournament MOP (1992); 2× NCAA champion (1990, 1992); Iowa Miss Basketball (1989); As head coach: 2× CCAA Tournament (2008, 2015); 3× CCAA regular season (2008, 2015, 2016); Bay Valley Coach of the Year (2005); CCAA Coach of the Year (2008)
- Stats at Basketball Reference

Molly Colleen Goodenbour (born February 8, 1972) is an American college basketball coach and former professional basketball player who is the current women's basketball head coach at the University of San Francisco. Goodenbour previously was head coach at Santa Rosa Junior College, UC Irvine, and Cal State Dominguez Hills.

== College career ==
Goodenbour graduated from Waterloo West High School in Waterloo, Iowa and went on to play basketball at Stanford from 1989 to 1993. Goodenbour was a freshman reserve guard on Stanford's 1990 National Championship team. As a junior in 1992, she was named Most Outstanding Player as Stanford won their 2nd national championship in 1992. In the tournament, she set the record for most three-pointers made with 18.

== USA Basketball ==
Goodenbour was named to the team representing the US at the 1995 Pan American Games, however, only four teams committed to participate, so the event was cancelled.

== Professional career ==
Following her college career, Goodenbour played professional basketball for Linkspring Dambasket in Sweden in the 1995–96 season. She joined the Richmond Rage of the American Basketball League in 1996–97, who played in the inaugural ABL Championship. Goodenbour played in 40 games with 11 starts. She averaged 20.2 minutes per game, 7.3 points, 1.4 assists and 2.0 rebounds. She was sixth in the ABL in three-point field goal percentage with .411. During the playoffs, Goodenbour started all seven games for the Rage and averaged 8 points.

Goodenbour signed with the New England Blizzard during the off-season, but was traded to the Portland Power on August 25, 1997 in exchange for a third round pick in the 1998 ABL Draft. During the 1998 ABL Draft, the San Jose Lasers drafted Goodenbour, as she joined the league as an undrafted free agent. She never signed with the Lasers and retired from playing.

During the 2000 expansion draft on December 15, 1999, Goodenbour was selected by the Portland Fire. However, Goodenbour would never play in the WNBA.

== Coaching career ==
Goodenbour coached women's basketball for one year in 1994–95 for the University of San Francisco before embarking on her professional career. She returned to coaching in 2002 as associate head coach at Santa Rosa Junior College. She became head coach in 2003, guiding the team to two conference titles. She was named Bay Valley Conference Coach of the Year in 2005. In 2005, she returned to USF as lead assistant coach for one season, then was hired as head coach for the Chico State Wildcats in 2006. She was named California Collegiate Athletic Association Coach of the Year in 2008 as the Wildcats compiled a 28–6 record and finished the season ranked 17th in the Division II Coaches Poll.

Goodenbour was hired to coach women's basketball at UC Irvine in 2008, where she remained for four years. On February 28, 2012, UC Irvine suspended Goodenbour for one game without pay for making what the university called an "insensitive" remark towards a student who had a disability. UC Irvine later placed Goodenbour on administrative leave from March 23 through the end of her contract on August 4; the university decided not to renew Goodenbour's contract. Goodenbour had a 44–76 overall record at UC Irvine in four seasons.

On May 30, 2012, Goodenbour was hired as head coach at Cal State Dominguez Hills, replacing Van Girard, the winningest women's basketball head coach in the program's history. With her hire, Goodenbour became the fourth head coach in CSUDH women's basketball history.

On June 8, 2016, Cal State East Bay hired Goodenbour as head women's basketball coach, after Suzy Barcomb moved up to Division I Seattle.

Less than four months later on September 28, 2016, Goodenbour was hired as the University of San Francisco Don's ninth head women's basketball coach after her former Stanford Cardinal teammate and previous Dons coach Jennifer Azzi resigned from the post as head coach two weeks earlier.

In 2022, a lawsuit was filed against Goodenbour with USF named as a secondary defendant. by former players Marta and Marija Galic. The Galic sisters, both overseas student athletes from Croatia, allege that Goodenbour engaged in “archaic and abusive conduct”, highlighting an instance where Goodenbour refused to allow Marta Galic to go to the bathroom and thereby forced her to urinate on herself in front of her teammates. Marija Galic additionally stated in the filing that Goodenbour subjectged her to verbal and psychological abuse, causing her to suffer from nervous breakdowns, and that Goodenbour did not follow the proper concussion protocols. Goodenbour and USF responded by denying an intent to cause the harm the sisters described. Both further argued that the bathroom incident described by the sisters never happened. Mike Vartain, a lawyer for USF, said that Goodenbour would never want a player to urinate in their pants, and that no such prohibition on going to the bathroom without asking would exist.

A San Francisco County Superior Court jury ruled in favor of Marija Galic, awarding her $750,000 because of “intentional infliction of emotional distress” by coach Goodenbour. The jury ruled against Marta Galic on her allegations.

== Personal ==
Goodenbour is married to Pat Fuscaldo, head men's basketball coach at Sonoma State University.

== Head coaching record ==
=== Junior college ===
Record table
Season	Team	Overall	Conference	Standing	Postseason
Santa Rosa Bear Cubs (Bay Valley Conference) (2003–2005)
2003–04	Santa Rosa	24–6	13–1	T–1st (Bay)	CCCAA Elite Eight
2004–05	Santa Rosa	25–5	14–0	1st (Bay)	CCCAA Regional
Santa Rosa:		49–11 (.817)	27–1 (.964)		
Total:		49–11 (.817)			
National champion Postseason invitational champion Conference regular season champion Conference regular season and conference tournament champion Division regular season champion Division regular season and conference tournament champion Conference tournament champion

=== College ===
- San Francisco
- WCC

Record table
Season	Team	Overall	Conference	Standing	Postseason
Chico State Wildcats (California Collegiate Athletic Association) (2006–2008)
2006–07	Chico State	24–5	18–4	3rd	NCAA Division II Third Round
2007–08	Chico State	28–6	17–3	1st	NCAA Division II Second Round
Chico State:		52–11 (.825)	35–7 (.833)		
UC Irvine Anteaters (Big West Conference) (2008–2012)
2008–09	UC Irvine	7–23	4–12	T–7th	
2009–10	UC Irvine	9–21	6–10	7th	
2010–11	UC Irvine	15–15	7–9	5th	
2011–12	UC Irvine	13–17	9–7	T–3rd	
UC Irvine:		44–76 (.367)	26–38 (.406)		
Cal State Dominguez Hills Toros (California Collegiate Athletic Association) (2012–2016)
2012–13	Cal State Dominguez Hills	9–17	8–14	9th	
2013–14	Cal State Dominguez Hills	20–10	13–9	T–3rd	
2014–15	Cal State Dominguez Hills	26–7	19–3	T–1st	NCAA Division II First Round
2015–16	Cal State Dominguez Hills	22–10	18–2	T–1st	NCAA Division II first round
Cal State Dominguez Hills:		77–44 (.636)	58–28 (.674)		
San Francisco Dons (West Coast Conference) (2016–present)
2016–17	San Francisco	18–13	11–7	4th	
2017–18	San Francisco	16–15	10–8	5th	
2018–19	San Francisco	7–24	2–16	T–9th	
2019–20	San Francisco	12–19	5–13	T–8th	
2020–21	San Francisco	16–11	10–7	4th	WNIT second round
2021–22	San Francisco	17–16	10–8	3rd	WNIT first round
2022–23	San Francisco	19–13	9–9	T–4th	WNIT first round
2023–24	San Francisco	14–16	10–6	T–3rd	
2024–25	San Francisco	15–16	11–9	5th	
2025–26	San Francisco	19–15	9–9	7th	WNIT Second Round
San Francisco:		153–158 (.492)	87–89 (.494)		
Total:		326–289 (.530)			
National champion Postseason invitational champion Conference regular season champion Conference regular season and conference tournament champion Division regular season champion Division regular season and conference tournament champion Conference tournament champion

== Career statistics ==
Legend
GP	Games played	GS	Games started	MPG	Minutes per game	RPG	Rebounds per game
APG	Assists per game	SPG	Steals per game	BPG	Blocks per game	PPG	Points per game
TO	Turnovers per game	FG%	Field-goal percentage	3P%	3-point field-goal percentage	FT%	Free-throw percentage
**Bold**	Career best	°	League leader

=== College ===
Year	Team	GP	GS	MPG	FG%	3P%	FT%	RPG	APG	SPG	BPG	TO	PPG
1989–90	Stanford	26	-	-	**48.0**	**45.5**	86.7	0.7	1.1	0.4	0.1	-	2.7
1990–91	Stanford	29	-	-	35.4	32.6	**95.5**	1.8	1.7	0.9	0.1	-	4.9
1991–92	Stanford	**33**	-	-	44.7	42.3	73.6	3.3	5.4	**1.6**	0.2	-	12.3
1992–93	Stanford	32	-	-	39.1	38.5	79.6	**3.8**	**5.9**	**1.6**	**0.3**	-	**13.2**
**Career**		120	-	-	41.1	39.0	79.3	2.5	3.7	1.2	0.2	-	8.7
Statistics retrieved from Sports-Reference.
