= Teresa Edwards =

American basketball player (born 1964)

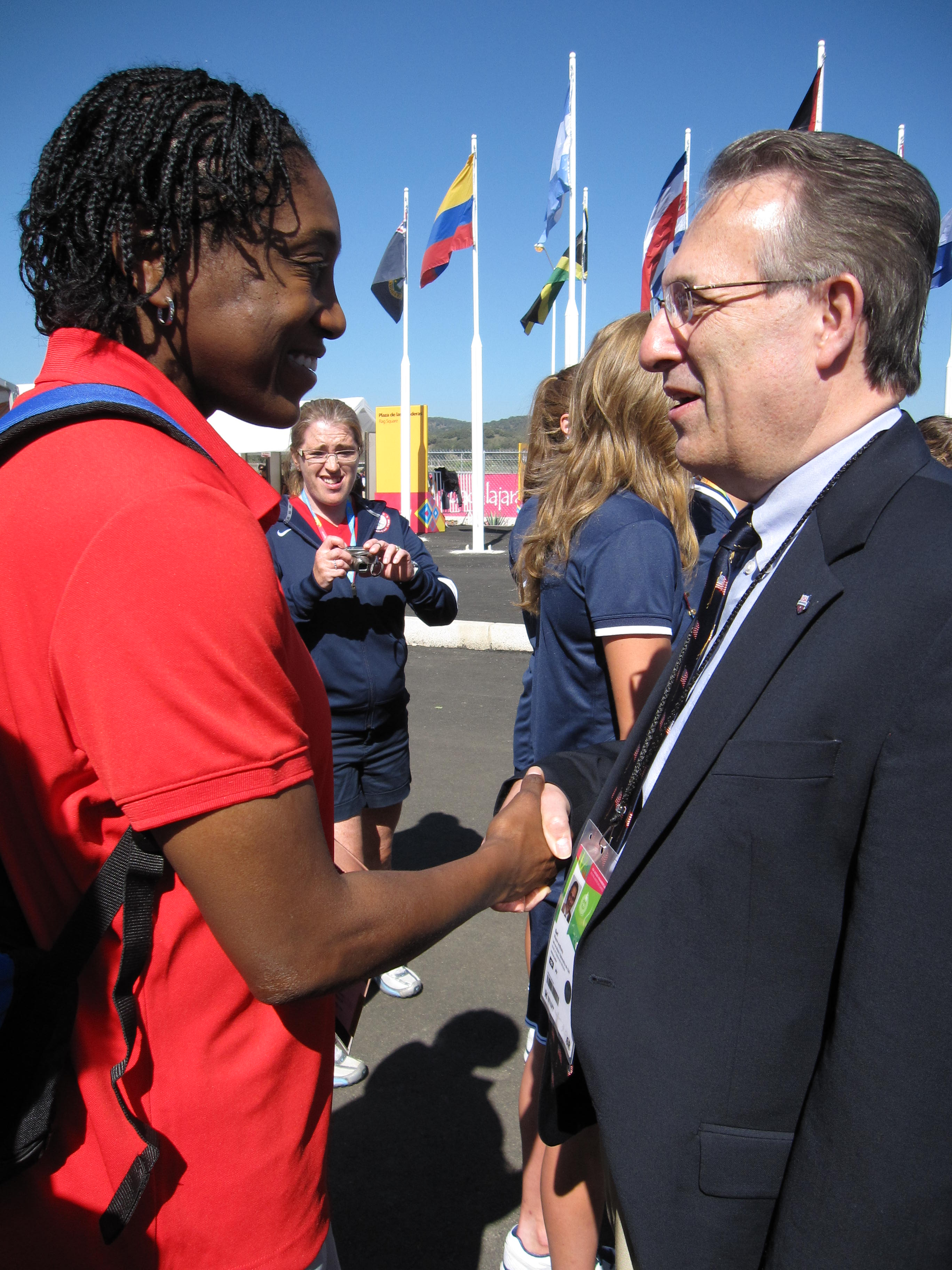
- Edwards and ambassador Earl Anthony Wayne in 2011

Personal information
- Born: July 19, 1964 (age 62) Cairo, Georgia, U.S.
- Listed height: 5 ft 11 in (1.80 m)

Career information
- High school: Cairo (Cairo, Georgia)
- College: Georgia (1982–1986)
- WNBA draft: 2003: 2nd round, 14th overall pick
- Drafted by: Minnesota Lynx
- Playing career: 1996–2004
- Coaching career: 2007–2014

Career history

Playing
- 1996–1998: Atlanta Glory
- 1998: Philadelphia Rage
- 2003–2004: Minnesota Lynx

Career highlights
- 4× USA Basketball Female Athlete of the Year (1987, 1990, 1996, 2000); 2× Kodak All-American (1985, 1986); SEC Tournament MVP (1983)
- Stats at Basketball Reference
- Basketball Hall of Fame
- Women's Basketball Hall of Fame
- FIBA Hall of Fame
Medals
Women's basketball
Representing the United States
Olympic Games
Gold medal – first place	1984 Los Angeles	Team competition
Gold medal – first place	1988 Seoul	Team competition
Gold medal – first place	1996 Atlanta	Team competition
Gold medal – first place	2000 Sydney	Team competition
Bronze medal – third place	1992 Barcelona	Team competition
FIBA World Championship
Gold medal – first place	1986 Soviet Union	Team competition
Gold medal – first place	1990 Malaysia	Team competition
Bronze medal – third place	1994 Australia	Team competition
Pan American Games
Bronze medal – third place	1991 Havana	Team competition
Gold medal – first place	1987 Indianapolis	Team competition
Jones Cup
Gold medal – first place	1984 Taipei	Team competition
Gold medal – first place	1987 Taipei	Team competition
Silver medal – second place	1988 Taipei	Team competition

Teresa Edwards (born July 19, 1964) is an American former women's basketball player and four time Olympic gold medalist.

In 2000, Sports Illustrated magazine placed her as 22nd of the "100 Greatest Female Athletes of the 20th Century". She played for, and graduated from, the University of Georgia.

The US Olympic Committee appointed Edwards as chef de mission for the 2012 Olympic Games. In 2010, Edwards was inducted into the Women's Basketball Hall of Fame. In 2013, she was inducted into the FIBA Hall of Fame. She has been inducted into the Naismith Basketball Hall of Fame twice: in 2011 for her individual career, and in 2026 as a member of the 1996 United States women's Olympic basketball team. In 2021, Edwards published an autobiographical audio book, Black Gold, about her basketball career, with a focus on her Olympic experiences.

== High school ==
Born in Cairo, Georgia, Edwards attended Cairo High School, where she was a four-year starter. In her junior and senior years, the Syrupmakers were 58–3. She scored 1,982 points in her high school career, and was honored as the Georgia High School Player of the Year in 1982.

== College years ==
Edwards began her college career for the Georgia Lady Bulldogs basketball at the University of Georgia where she was a two time All-American. She was the starting point guard for the Georgia Lady Bulldogs, helping lead them to the Final Four in 1983 and 1985. Edwards played in her first Olympic Games in 1984 as a collegian, and won her first of four gold medals as the youngest member of the team. Her college jersey number (#5) was retired, making her one of only three Lady Bulldog players given that honor. She earned her degree in leisure studies in 1990.

=== Georgia statistics ===
Legend
GP	Games played	GS	Games started	MPG	Minutes per game
FG%	Field goal percentage	3P%	3-point field goal percentage	FT%	Free throw percentage
RPG	Rebounds per game	APG	Assists per game	SPG	Steals per game
BPG	Blocks per game	PPG	Points per game	**Bold**	Career high

Year	Team	GP	Points	FG%	FT%	RPG	APG	SPG	BPG	PPG
83	Georgia	**33**	430	45.9%	63.4%	2.2	3.0	2.1	0.3	13.0
84	Georgia	**33**	465	52.1%	78.5%	2.5	5.7	2.5	0.4	14.1
85	Georgia	30	464	52.7%	73.4%	2.8	**6.3**	**3.3**	**0.4**	15.5
86	Georgia	32	**630**	**55.8%**	**78.8%**	**4.6**	5.5	2.8	0.4	19.7
Career	Georgia	128	1989	51.8%	73.6%	3.0	5.1	2.7	0.4	15.5

== ABL career ==
Edwards was the star player and head coach for the Atlanta Glory of the American Basketball League (ABL). She played in the ABL inaugural game between the Glory and the San Jose Lasers, won by the Lasers 78–70. She was traded to the Philadelphia Rage in 1998.

== WNBA career ==
During the 2003 WNBA draft, at the urging of Minnesota Lynx head coach Suzie McConnell Serio, the Lynx selected Edwards even though she was 38 years old. Edwards and Serio were teammates on the women's basketball team during the Summer Olympics of 1988 and 1992.

Edwards played for the Lynx during the 2003 and 2004 seasons. Afterwards, her contract expired and she became a free agent. No other WNBA team offered her a contract for the 2005 season.

In December 2006, Edwards returned to Lynx as an assistant coach.

Edwards served as an analyst for NBC Sports coverage of Basketball at the 2008 Summer Olympics.

In 2011, Edwards was named as assistant coach of the Tulsa Shock. She would later become the interim head coach after Nolan Richardson resigned on July 9, 2011.

On March 4, 2014, Edwards was hired by the Atlanta Dream as the assistant coach.

== WNBA career statistics ==
Legend
GP	Games played	GS	Games started	MPG	Minutes per game	RPG	Rebounds per game
APG	Assists per game	SPG	Steals per game	BPG	Blocks per game	PPG	Points per game
TO	Turnovers per game	FG%	Field-goal percentage	3P%	3-point field-goal percentage	FT%	Free-throw percentage
**Bold**	Career best	°	League leader

=== Regular season ===
Year	Team	GP	GS	MPG	FG%	3P%	FT%	RPG	APG	SPG	BPG	TO	PPG
2003	Minnesota	**34**	**34**	**25.1**	**.375**	**.300**	**.775**	**3.1**	**4.4**	1.2	**0.3**	2.7	5.3
2004	Minnesota	34	34	20.5	.370	.294	.700	2.6	2.3	**1.4**	0.2	2.7	**5.7**
Career	2 years, 1 team	68	68	22.8	.372	.297	.743	2.9	3.3	1.3	0.3	2.7	5.5

=== Playoffs ===
Year	Team	GP	GS	MPG	FG%	3P%	FT%	RPG	APG	SPG	BPG	TO	PPG
2003	Minnesota	**3**	**3**	**27.7**	**.316**	**.333**	**1.000**	**3.3**	**6.3**	**1.7**	0.3	2.7	**6.7**
2004	Minnesota	2	2	21.5	.167	.200	.750	2.5	1.0	1.5	**0.5**	2.0	3.0
Career	2 years, 1 team	5	5	25.2	.280	.294	.875	3.0	4.2	1.6	0.4	2.4	5.2

== International career ==
After Edwards graduated, she played abroad for nine seasons splitting time between Vicenza- Italy, Nagoya- Japan, Spain (Dorna Godella), and France (Tarbes and Valenciennes). During this time, she also continued to appear in international competition.

After the 1994 season, she stayed in the United States to train for her fourth Olympic appearance at the 1996 Summer Olympics. Edwards was selected to take the competitors' oath at the Opening Ceremonies in Atlanta (the opening ceremonies took place on her 32nd birthday). She was named the 1996 Sportswoman of the Year (in the team category) by the Women's Sports Foundation.

She competed for the United States in international competition a total of 19 times. Her teams won 14 gold medals.

In 1984, the USA sent its National team to the 1984 William Jones Cup competition in Taipei, Taiwan, for pre-Olympic practice. The team easily beat each of the eight teams they played, winning by an average of just under 50 points per game. Edwards averaged 5.5 points per game.

Edwards is the first female basketball player to have played in five Olympics. She is jointly (with Australian Andrew Gaze) the third basketball player to compete at five Olympics along with Puerto Rican Teófilo Cruz and Brazilian Oscar Schmidt.

She also holds the distinction of being the 'youngest gold medalist in women's basketball' (age 20 in 1984) and the oldest gold medalist in women's basketball (age 36 in 2000).

She made a record fifth Olympic basketball team, earning a fourth gold medal to go with her bronze medal. She returned to Europe in 2002.

Edwards was named to the team representing the US at the 1987 William Jones Cup competition in Taipei, Taiwan. The team won all seven games to win the gold medal for the event. Edwards led the team in scoring with 23 points against China. The USA won the gold medal game by a single point over South Korea, helped by Edwards key free throws with a minute left in the game. She was the team's second leading scorer with 12.4 points per game over the seven games, and was named to the all-tournament team. In the following year, 1988, Edwards was also named to the Jones Cup team. The USA team was not as successful, with a 3–2 record, but that was enough to secure the silver medal. She averaged 15.4 points per game to lead her team in scoring.

Edwards was a member of the 1987 gold medal-winning USA Women's Pan American Team in Indiana, and the 1991 bronze medal-winning team in Havana, Cuba.

Edwards was a member of the USA National team at the 1990 World Championships, held in Kuala Lumpur, Malaysia. The team won their opening round games fairly easily, with the closest of the first three games a 27-point victory over Czechoslovakia. Then they faced Cuba, a team that had beaten the US in exhibition matches only a few weeks earlier. The USA team was losing at halftime, but came back to win 87–78. Edwards hit four of her five three-point attempts, and scored 32 points, along with five steals. The USA team found itself behind at halftime to Canada in their next game, but came back to win easily 95–70. After an easy match against Bulgaria, the USA team faced Czechoslovakia again, end achieved an almost identical result, winning 87–59. In the title match, the USA team won the gold medal with a score of 88–78. Edwards led the team in scoring and assists, averaging 21.9 points per game and recording 24 assist for the event.

Edwards was named to the USA national team and competed in the 1994 World Championships, held in June 1994 in Sydney, Australia. The team was coached by Tara VanDerveer, and won their first six games, when they faced Brazil. In a closely contested, high-scoring game, Brazil hit ten of ten free throws in the final minute to secure a 110–107 victory. The USA won a close final game against Australia 100–95 to earn the bronze medal. Edwards had the second highest scoring average on the team with 12.7 points per game.

She also holds the record for points in an ABL game with 46.

== Head coaching record ==
Team	Year	G	W	L	W–L%	Finish	PG	PW	PL	PW–L%	Result
Tulsa	2011	23	2	21	.087	6th in Western	—	—	—	—	Missed playoffs
Career		23	2	21	.087		—	—	—	—	

== Awards and honors ==
- 2001: Georgia Sports Hall of Fame
- 2010: Women's Basketball Hall of Fame
- 2009–2012: USA Basketball Board of Directors
- 2011: Inducted to the Naismith Memorial Basketball Hall of Fame
- 2011: NCAA Silver Anniversary Award
- 2013: FIBA Hall of Fame

== See also ==
- List of multiple Olympic gold medalists in one event
- List of athletes with the most appearances at Olympic Games
