= Val Whiting =

American basketball player (born 1972)

Personal information
- Born: April 9, 1972 (age 54) South Orange, New Jersey, U.S.
- Listed height: 6 ft 3 in (1.91 m)

Career information
- High school: Ursuline Academy (Wilmington, Delaware)
- College: Stanford (1989–1993)
- WNBA draft: 1999: 2nd round, 17th overall pick
- Drafted by: Detroit Shock
- Position: Power forward / center
- Number: 52

Career history
- 1996–1997: San Jose Lasers
- 1997–1998: Seattle Reign
- 1999: Detroit Shock
- 2001–2002: Minnesota Lynx

Career highlights
- 2× NCAA champion (1990, 1992); All-American – USBWA (1993); 2× Kodak All-American (1992, 1993); 2× Pac-10 Player of the Year (1992, 1993); 2× All Pac-10 (1992, 1993)
- Stats at Basketball Reference

Valeria Olivia Whiting (born April 9, 1972) (also known as Val Whiting-Raymond) is an American former collegiate and professional basketball player. She played center for the Stanford Cardinal women's basketball during her four years of pre-med study at Stanford. Among other collegiate honors, she was named Pac-10 Women's Basketball Player of the Year two years in a row. She also played for several USA National teams as well as professional women's basketball teams.

== Early life ==
Whiting grew up in Wilmington, Delaware. For high school, she attended Ursuline Academy where, according to the Delaware Sports Museum and Hall of Fame, she "led her team to four Delaware scholastic basketball titles and was a multi-year All-State performer."

Whiting was a pre-med student at Stanford, where she earned a BS in Biological Sciences. She deferred her acceptance to University of California, San Francisco School of Medicine in order to play basketball in Brazil and Italy.

== Basketball career ==
=== College years (Stanford 1989–1993) ===
Whiting played for the Stanford Cardinal women's basketball team all four years of her time at Stanford. In 1990, at the end of her rookie (freshman) season, she was named Freshman of the Year both by the Pac-10 Conference and by the Women's Basketball News Service.

Also in 1990, Whiting was on the USA team for the U.S. Olympic Festival, an amateur multi-sport event that used to be held in the years between Olympic Games by the United States Olympic Committee, which took place in Minneapolis that year.

Whiting won two NCAA championships and went to the Final Four three years. Stanford also won four Pac-10 championships. She graduated as the school's all-time leading scorer and all-time leader in rebounds and blocks. She also left as the all-time leading scorer and rebounder in Pac-10 history. Including high school, Val has won 10 championships in total.

=== Post-college basketball ===
After graduating from Stanford, Whiting postponed going to medical school in order to play more basketball. She spent a year playing in Italy, followed by two years in Brazil.

Whiting was one of twelve players on the USA National team that trained at the Olympic Training Center in Colorado Springs for the 1995 Pan American Games. Because only four international women's teams registered for the event, however, the women's basketball event was cancelled.

Whiting was an alternate for the 1995-1996 US Olympic women's basketball team. In 1996, the US team won the gold medal at the 1996 Summer Olympics in Atlanta.

==== American Basketball League ====
In 1996, the American Basketball League (ABL) was the first independent professional basketball league for women in the United States. They recruited both Whiting and her Stanford teammate Jennifer Azzi for the San Jose Lasers. Whiting was also chosen for to play on the "West" All-Star team in the December, 1996 ABL All-Star Game.

After one season with the Lasers, during which she was their leading rebounder, Whiting was traded to the Seattle Reign in 1997. In order to get Whiting, the Reign traded to the Lasers another player plus $20,000 and a third-round draft pick. At the end of the 1997–1998 season, Whiting was the Reign's second in scoring (15.4) and in rebounding (7.2) She played with the Seattle Reign from 1997 until, in 1998, the ABL folded.

==== Women's National Basketball League ====
Whiting was drafted to the Women's National Basketball Association in 1998. She played the 1999 season for the Detroit Shock. After taking a year away from basketball, she played for two years (2001-2002) for the Minnesota Lynx.

== Career statistics ==
Legend
GP	Games played	GS	Games started	MPG	Minutes per game	RPG	Rebounds per game
APG	Assists per game	SPG	Steals per game	BPG	Blocks per game	PPG	Points per game
TO	Turnovers per game	FG%	Field-goal percentage	3P%	3-point field-goal percentage	FT%	Free-throw percentage
**Bold**	Career best	°	League leader

=== WNBA ===
==== Regular season ====
Year	Team	GP	GS	MPG	FG%	3P%	FT%	RPG	APG	SPG	BPG	TO	PPG
1999	Detroit	**31**	**20**	**24.6**	**.380**	0.0	.455	**6.7**	**1.6**	**1.3**	**1.0**	1.5	**6.5**
2001	Minnesota	26	15	17.8	.267	.000	**.741**	3.2	0.6	0.6	0.5	1.3	3.4
2002	Minnesota	6	3	8.7	.308	.000	.417	1.5	0.8	0.3	0.3	**0.7**	2.2
Career	3 years, 2 teams	63	38	20.3	.343	.000	.540	4.7	1.1	0.9	0.7	1.3	4.8

==== Playoffs ====
Year	Team	GP	GS	MPG	FG%	3P%	FT%	RPG	APG	SPG	BPG	TO	PPG
1999	Detroit	1	1	27.0	.286	.000	.600	6.0	1.0	2.0	1.0	2.0	7.0
Career	1 year, 1 team	1	1	27.0	.286	.000	.600	6.0	1.0	2.0	1.0	2.0	7.0

Legend
GP	Games played	GS	Games started	MPG	Minutes per game	RPG	Rebounds per game
APG	Assists per game	SPG	Steals per game	BPG	Blocks per game	PPG	Points per game
TO	Turnovers per game	FG%	Field-goal percentage	3P%	3-point field-goal percentage	FT%	Free-throw percentage
**Bold**	Career best	°	League leader

=== College ===
Year	Team	GP	GS	MPG	FG%	3P%	FT%	RPG	APG	SPG	BPG	TO	PPG
1989–90	Stanford	32	-	-	**54.7**	33.3	71.4	7.4	1.3	1.2	**1.8**	-	12.4
1990–91	Stanford	32	-	-	45.9	0.0	71.1	**9.7**	**2.0**	1.3	1.5	-	14.7
1991–92	Stanford	**33**	-	-	51.3	0.0	**75.3**	9.1	**2.0**	1.6	1.4	-	18.5
1992–93	Stanford	32	-	-	51.3	**38.5**	70.4	8.9	1.5	**1.8**	1.5	-	**18.7**
**Career**		129	-	-	50.7	26.1	72.2	8.8	1.7	1.5	1.6	-	16.1
Statistics retrieved from Sports-Reference.

== Awards and honors ==
=== College ===
- Stanford Athletic Hall of Fame (inducted in 2000)
- ESPY Award Finalist
- Naismith Award Finalist
- In 2010, ESPN named her one of the Top 25 NCAA Players of the Past 25 years.
- 2x All-American (1992, 1993) Both Kodak and U.S. Basketball Writers Association each time
- 2x Pac-10 Player of the Year (1992, 1993)
- 1990 Pac-10 Freshman of the Year
- 1990 National Freshman of the Year
- 2x All-Pac-10 First Team (1992, 1993)
- Pac-10 All-Freshman Team (1990)
- 1992 All-Final Four Team
- 1991 West Region MVP
- 2x All-West Region Team (1991, 1992)

· 2,077 career points

o Currently 6th all-time at Stanford and 16th in the Pac-12 o Both Stanford and conference leader at the time she graduated

· 16.1 career PPG

o Currently 7th all-time at Stanford and was 2nd when she graduated

· 481 career FT made

o Currently 4th all-time at Stanford and was 1st when she graduated

· 1,134 career rebounds

o Currently 6th all-time at Stanford and 14th in the Pac-12 o Both Stanford and conference leader at the time she graduated

· 8.8 career RPG

o Currently 3rd all-time at Stanford and 15th in the Pac-12 o Both Stanford and conference leader at the time she graduated

· 201 career blocks

o Currently 3rd all-time at Stanford and 10th in the Pac-12 o Stanford's leader and second in conference history at the time she graduated.

=== Professional ===
- ABL All-Star Team 1996
- WNBA Community Assist Award

=== Hall of Fames ===
- Stanford Athletic Hall of Fame
- Ursuline Academy Athletic Hall of Fame
- The Hall of Fame of Delaware Women (inducted 2007)
- The Delaware Basketball Hall of Fame
- Delaware Afro-American Sports Hall of Fame
- Delaware Sports Hall of Fame (inducted 2007)

=== USA Basketball ===
- US Olympic Festival 1990
- R. William Jones Cup Team 1991
- Was named to USA Basketball Pan-American Games Team in 1995
- Alternate to the 1995 US National team that went on to win the gold medal at the 1996 Olympics

== Coaching career ==
Whiting signed with Athletes Untapped as a private mental performance coach on Sep 26, 2024.
