= Karen Bryant =

American sports executive

Personal information
- Born: August 24, 1967 (age 59) Edmonds, Washington, U.S.

Career information
- College: Washington

Karen Bryant (born August 24, 1967) is a basketball executive. She last served as the Chief Administrative Officer and General Manager of the Los Angeles Sparks of the WNBA. Bryant started her professional sports career in the American Basketball League from 1996 to 1998. Bryant started out as the director of basketball operations for the Seattle Reign in 1996 before being named general manager in 1998. After the ABL closed in 1998, Bryant joined the WNBA as part of the newly formed Seattle Storm in 1999. With the Storm, Bryant held multiple executive positions between 1999 and 2014. Her executive roles with the Storm included chief operating officer from 2003 to 2008 and chief executive officer between 2008 and 2014.

== Early life and education ==
In the late 1960s, Bryant was born in Edmonds, Washington. As a child, Bryant played wiffle ball and association football before deciding on basketball in elementary school. From the 1980s to 1990s, Bryant continued to play basketball while completing her high school and post-secondary education. Bryant attended Green River Community College and Seattle University for two years each before moving to the University of Washington in 1990. A year later, Bryant received a Bachelor of Arts from Washington and specialized in communications.

== Career ==
After completing her post-secondary education, Bryant coached the girls basketball team at Woodinville High School between 1993 and 1996. Bryant then worked in project management before joining the American Basketball League in 1996. While in the ABL, Bryant started out as the director of basketball operations for the Seattle Reign. After becoming an assistant general manager for the Reign, Bryant was named their general manager in February 1998 after Jim Weyermann stepped down from his position. In December 1998, Bryant ended her general manager position with the Reign upon the closure of the ABL.

In 1999, Bryant joined the newly formed Seattle Storm in the WNBA as their vice president. She remained as the Storm's vice president until she was named chief operating officer in November 2003. While adding an executive position in communications in 2006, Bryant continued to work as chief operating officer until becoming the Storm's chief executive officer in 2008. Bryant remained as CEO until she left the Storm in 2014 and was replaced by Alisha Valavanis. After ending her basketball position, Bryant switched to football safety after she joined Atavus Sports in 2017 as their chief operating officer. In 2021, Bryant began working in consulting when she helped create KB2 Sports. The following year, Bryant became a co-owner of the NJ/NY Gotham FC.

On January 3, 2023, Bryant was named the new Chief Administrative Officer and General Manager of the Los Angeles Sparks in the WNBA. Bryant led the search for her replacement and on January 5, 2024 Raegan Pebley was named Sparks GM.

== Personal life ==
Bryant has one child.
