= Venus Lacy =

American basketball player (born 1967)

Personal information
- Born: February 9, 1967 (age 59) Chattanooga, Tennessee, U.S.
- Listed height: 6 ft 4 in (1.93 m)

Career highlights
- WBCA Player of the Year (1990); Kodak All-American (1990); All-American – USBWA (1990); USA Basketball Female Athlete of the Year (1989)
- Stats at Basketball Reference
Medals
Women's basketball
Representing the United States
Olympic Games
Gold medal – first place	1996 Atlanta	Team competition
Pan American Games
Bronze medal – third place	1991 Havana	Team

Venus Lacy (some sources give her name as Venus Lacey, born February 9, 1967) is an American former professional basketball who played as a 6-foot-4-inch (1.93 m) center. Born in Chattanooga, Tennessee, she won championships at every level, but her American professional career was diminished by injuries she sustained in a 1997 car accident. She was inducted into the Naismith Basketball Hall of Fame in 2026 as a member of the 1996 United States women's Olympic basketball team.

== High school and college ==
A local sports heroine (a city parkway is named after her), Lacy led Chattanooga's Brainerd High School to the state championship in 1984.

Lacy attended Louisiana Tech University, which won the NCAA Women's Division I Basketball Championship in 1988. The next year, the Lady Techsters made the 1989 Final Four, but lost there to Auburn. In her Senior year, 1990, Louisiana Tech went undefeated through the regular season, and was ranked #1 in the national polls. That year Lacy was a consensus all-American, and was named the WBCA Player of the Year. The 1990 team again made the Final Four, where they were once again upset by their nemesis Auburn. Lacy finished her NCAA career with 266 points scored in the tournament, putting her among the all-time top 10 women at the time. Lacy was inducted into the Louisiana Tech University Athletic Hall of Fame in 2011.

=== Louisiana Tech statistics ===
Legend
GP	Games played	GS	Games started	MPG	Minutes per game	RPG	Rebounds per game
APG	Assists per game	SPG	Steals per game	BPG	Blocks per game	PPG	Points per game
TO	Turnovers per game	FG%	Field-goal percentage	3P%	3-point field-goal percentage	FT%	Free-throw percentage
**Bold**	Career best	°	League leader

Year	Team	GP	Points	FG%	3P%	FT%	RPG	APG	SPG	BPG	PPG
1988	Louisiana Tech	33	480	54.1%	0%	55.8%	9.2	0.5	1.2	1.5	14.5
1989	Louisiana Tech	**34**	724	55.2%	**75.0%**	66.8%	11.9	**0.6**	0.9	1.2	21.3°
1990	Louisiana Tech	33	**800**	**60.3%**	33.3%	**73.3%**	**12.7**	0.5	**2.0**	**2.2**	**24.2**
Career		100	2004	56.8%	50.0%	66.6%	11.3	0.6	1.4	1.6	20.0

== USA Basketball ==
Lacy played with the USA team at the 1991 Pan American Games, held in Havana, Cuba. The team finished with a record of 4–2, but managed to win the bronze medal. The USA team lost a three point game to Brazil, then responded with wins over Argentina and Cuba, earning a spot in the medal round. The next game was a rematch against Cuba, and this time the team from Cuba won a five point game. The USA beat Canada easily to win the bronze. Lacy averaged 9.4 points per game.

Lacy was also a member of the gold-medal-winning 1996 Olympic team. Lacy was the last player added to the USA's 12-woman roster, joining the team midway through its year-long exhibition tour to add size in the paint. The team went an undefeated 52-0 in this unprecedented Olympic preparation year against a variety of college, all-star and international teams.

== Professional career ==
Because the U.S. lacked a women's pro league, Lacy's professional career began overseas, where she played for teams in Greece, Italy and Japan. She led Greece to a European championship in the 1995-1996 season.

Lacy was the first player selected by the Seattle Reign in the ABL Draft on June 19, 1996. However, Lacy was seriously injured in a car accident on February 4, 1997, and completed her season in Seattle on the injured list. After that year, she was selected by the ABL's expansion Long Beach Stingrays. Long Beach made the ABL Finals in their first and only season, where they lost the championship to the Columbus Quest, two games to three. Notwithstanding their on-court success, the Long Beach franchise folded after one year, and next year Lacy was once again drafted by another ABL expansion team, the even shorter-lived Nashville Noise. Just 15 games into the 1998-1999 season, on December 22, 1998, the ABL itself folded.

Lacy went undrafted by any WNBA team in the special post-ABL consolidation draft. However, midway through the 1999 season, Lacy was picked up by the New York Liberty to fill in for their injured All-star center, Rebecca Lobo. Lacy played in 17 games that year for the Liberty, and in 2 more in 2000, retiring thereafter.

== WNBA career statistics ==
=== WNBA career statistics ===
Legend
GP	Games played	GS	Games started	MPG	Minutes per game	RPG	Rebounds per game
APG	Assists per game	SPG	Steals per game	BPG	Blocks per game	PPG	Points per game
TO	Turnovers per game	FG%	Field-goal percentage	3P%	3-point field-goal percentage	FT%	Free-throw percentage
**Bold**	Career best	°	League leader

==== Regular season ====
Year	Team	GP	GS	MPG	FG%	3P%	FT%	RPG	APG	SPG	BPG	TO	PPG
1999	New York	**17**	0	6.5	**41.7**	0.0	**80.0**	1.2	**0.1**	**0.2**	**0.2**	**0.8**	1.9
2000	New York	2	**2**	**9.0**	40.0	0.0	50.0	**2.5**	0.0	0.0	0.0	1.0	**3.0**
Career	2 years, 1 team	19	2	6.8	41.4	0.0	73.7	1.3	0.1	0.2	0.2	0.8	2.0

==== Playoffs ====
Year	Team	GP	GS	MPG	FG%	3P%	FT%	RPG	APG	SPG	BPG	TO	PPG
1999	New York	1	0	2.0	0.0	0.0	0.0	0.0	0.0	0.0	0.0	1.0	0.0
Career	1 years, 1 team	1	0	2.0	0.0	0.0	0.0	0.0	0.0	0.0	0.0	1.0	0.0
