= Katrina Price =

American basketball player (1975–1999)

Personal information
- Born: December 3, 1975 Anderson County, Texas, U.S.
- Died: January 18, 1999 (aged 23) Nacogdoches, Texas, U.S.
- Listed height: 5 ft 10 in (1.78 m)

Career information
- High school: La Vega (Waco, Texas)
- College: Stephen F. Austin (1994–1998)
- ABL draft: 1998: 1st round, 7th overall pick
- Drafted by: Long Beach Stingrays
- Playing career: 1998–1999
- Position: Guard
- Number: 2

Career history
- 1998: Philadelphia Rage

Career highlights
- Southland Tournament MVP (1998); 2× Southland Player of the Year (1997, 1998); 3× First-team All-Southland (1996–1998); Second-team All-Southland (1995); Southland Freshman of the Year (1995)
- Stats at Basketball Reference
Medals
Women's basketball
Representing United States
Jones Cup
Silver medal – second place	1997 Taipei	Team competition

Katrina Price (December 3, 1975 – January 18, 1999) was an American basketball player. A star guard in her college career at Stephen F. Austin State University, Price died by suicide after her rookie season in professional basketball.

== High school career ==
In 1994, Price was named Central Texas Player of the Year and co-Most Valuable Player for Central Texas Female Athlete of the Year. She was also a class salutatorian with a 4.25 GPA. In her senior year she led La Vega High School (Waco, Texas) to the 1994 state finals and a 32–4 record, and averaged 30.0 points, 13.0 rebounds, 6.0 assists, and 5.0 steals per game. The previous year, she was named 1993 Volleyball MVP of District 17-3A, for her performance in that sport.

== College career ==
In her Division I NCAA career, Price was Stephen F. Austin State University's all-time leading scorer with 2,278 career points and the Southland Conference player of the year in 1997 and 1998. A 5'-10" guard, she was a third-team AP All-American (first team Academica All American) selection her senior season (1997–1998), averaging 22.1 points and 5.3 rebounds a game. As of 2001 Price held the record for most three-point field goals in a single championship game, with seven, in a game against the University of Toledo in 1997.

Price excelled academically as well as athletically. In high school, she was second in her graduating class, and she made the Dean's List every semester she was in college.

== National team career ==
Price competed with USA Basketball as a member of the 1997 Jones Cup Team that won the silver medal in Taipei. Several of the games were close, with the USA team winning four games by six points or fewer, including an overtime game in the semifinal match against Japan. The gold medal game against South Korea was also close, but the USA fell 76–71 to claim the silver medal for the event. Price averaged 3.0 points per game.

== Professional career ==
Price was drafted seventh overall pick by the Long Beach Stingrays in the 1998 American Basketball League draft, but the team disbanded before she could play a game. She was assigned to the Philadelphia Rage roster in August. She was a reserve guard, playing in 12 of the Rage's 14 games before the league shut down in late December.

== Career statistics ==
Stephen F. Austin Ladyjacks basketball

Legend
GP	Games played	GS	Games started	MPG	Minutes per game	RPG	Rebounds per game
APG	Assists per game	SPG	Steals per game	BPG	Blocks per game	PPG	Points per game
TO	Turnovers per game	FG%	Field-goal percentage	3P%	3-point field-goal percentage	FT%	Free-throw percentage
**Bold**	Career best	°	League leader

=== College ===
Year	Team	GP	GS	MPG	FG%	3P%	FT%	RPG	APG	SPG	BPG	TO	PPG
1994–95	Stephen F. Austin	30	-	-	43.6	28.6	57.5	3.5	1.9	2.1	**0.1**	-	14.4
1995–96	Stephen F. Austin	31	-	-	45.7	29.6	62.6	4.5	**2.3**	2.1	**0.1**	-	18.8
1996–97	Stephen F. Austin	**33**	-	-	**46.4**	**32.9**	60.7	**5.3**	1.5	**2.3**	**0.1**	-	19.6
1997–98	Stephen F. Austin	28	-	-	45.6	**32.9**	**74.3**	5.1	1.3	1.8	0.0	-	**22.0**
**Career**		122	-	-	45.4	31.1	65.2	4.6	1.7	2.1	0.1	-	18.7
Statistics retrieved from Sports-Reference.

== Death ==
Price died in Nacogdoches, Texas, at the age of 23, of a self-inflicted shotgun wound to the head.

== See also ==
- List of basketball players who died during their careers
