= Natalie Williams =

American basketball and volleyball player (born 1970)

Personal information
- Born: November 30, 1970 (age 55) Long Beach, California, U.S.
- Listed height: 6 ft 2 in (1.88 m)
- Listed weight: 210 lb (95 kg)

Career information
- High school: Taylorsville (Taylorsville, Utah)
- College: UCLA (1990–1994)
- WNBA draft: 1999: 1st round, 3rd overall pick
- Drafted by: Utah Starzz
- Playing career: 1996–2005

Career history
- 1996–1998: Portland Power
- 1999–2002: Utah Starzz
- 2003–2005: Indiana Fever

Career highlights
- 4× WNBA All-Star (1999–2001, 2003); 3× All-WNBA First Team (1999–2001); WNBA rebounding champion (2000); 2× All-ABL First Team (1997, 1998); USA Basketball Female Athlete of the Year (1999); ABL MVP (1998); Kodak All-American (1994); 2× All-American – USBWA (1993, 1994); Pac-10 Player of the Year (1994); 3× First-team All-Pac-10 (1992–1994)

Career WNBA statistics
- Points: 2,894 (13.1 ppg)
- Rebounds: 1,832 (8.3 rpg)
- Assists: 308 (1.4 apg)
- Stats at Basketball Reference
- Women's Basketball Hall of Fame
Medals
Women's basketball
Representing United States
Olympic Games
Gold medal – first place	2000 Sydney	Team competition
World Cup
Gold medal – first place	1998 Germany	Team competition
Gold medal – first place	2002 China	Team competition
Jones Cup
Gold medal – first place	1996	Team competition

Natalie Jean Williams (born November 30, 1970) is an American basketball executive and former player in the Women's National Basketball Association (WNBA). Williams was inducted into the Women's Basketball Hall of Fame in 2016. She was also an accomplished volleyball player at UCLA. From 2022 to 2024, Williams served as the General Manager of the WNBA's Las Vegas Aces.

== Early years ==
Williams is the daughter of Nate Williams, a former basketball player who played for the Cincinnati Royals/Kansas City-Omaha Kings, New Orleans Jazz and the Golden State Warriors in the National Basketball Association during an eight-year career. She is African American.

Although she was born in Southern California, she went to high school at Taylorsville High School in Utah.

She also has two half brothers and one half sister. Both of her brothers played basketball but her sister chose to focus her athletic abilities on tennis.

== College years ==
She attended the University of California Los Angeles (UCLA), and graduated there in 1994. She was a four-year letter-winner in both basketball and volleyball, and is the first woman to earn All-America honors in both basketball and volleyball in the same year. She also led UCLA to NCAA volleyball titles in 1990 and 1991. She won the Honda-Broderick Award (now the Honda Sports Award) as the nation's best female collegiate volleyball player in both 1992 and 1993.

=== UCLA statistics ===
Legend
GP	Games played	GS	Games started	MPG	Minutes per game
FG%	Field goal percentage	3P%	3-point field goal percentage	FT%	Free throw percentage
RPG	Rebounds per game	APG	Assists per game	SPG	Steals per game
BPG	Blocks per game	PPG	Points per game	**Bold**	Career high

Year	Team	GP	Points	FG%	FT%	RPG	APG	SPG	BPG	PPG
1993-94	UCLA	**24**	**561**	**57.0%**	51.7%	13.1	**1.3**	**3.0**	1.0	**23.4**
1992-93	UCLA	23	488	47.3%	**74.8%**	13.5	1.2	2.5	**1.4**	21.2
1991-92	UCLA	23	495	56.0%	63.1%	**13.8**	1.3	2.8	1.3	21.5
1990-91	UCLA	19	269	50.0%	67.0%	10.3	0.7	1.6	0.6	14.2
Career	UCLA	89	1813	52.8%	63.2%	12.8	1.1	2.5	1.1	20.4

== ABL career ==
Natalie Williams played three seasons for the Portland Power in the American Basketball League (ABL). She was traded to the Long Beach Stingrays in April 1998, but when the team folded, she was reassigned to the Power. She was a two-time All-ABL first team selection, the 1998 ABL M.V.P., finished her first season as the league's top rebounder, averaging 12.5 rebounds per game, and on January 9, 1998, she grabbed a league record 22 rebounds.

== WNBA career ==
After the ABL folded, she was selected by her hometown team, the Utah Starzz in the first round (third pick overall) of the 1999 WNBA draft on May 4, 1999.

She played with the Starzz from 1999 to 2002. However, just a few weeks prior to the start of the 2003 season, she was traded to the Indiana Fever in a multi-player deal on May 1, 2003.

Prior to the start of the 2005 season, Williams announced that she would retire after the season ended, saying that she will concentrate on raising her adopted twins, as well as serving as an assistant coach for Skyline' high school Girls basketball team in Salt Lake City, Utah, and launching a new career in the real estate business. She is remembered by fans as one of the best rebounding power forwards in the early history of the WNBA.

== USA Basketball ==
Williams was invited to be a member of the Jones Cup team representing the US in 1996. She helped the team to a 9–0 record, and the gold medal in the event. Williams averaged 9.1 points per game. She also recorded 7.0 rebounds per game, highest on the team.

Williams was named to the USA national team in 1998. The national team traveled to Berlin, Germany in July and August 1998 for the FIBA World Championships. The USA team won a close opening game against Japan 95–89, then won their next six games easily. In the semifinal game against Brazil, the USA team was behind as much as ten points in the first half, but the USA went on to win 93–79. The gold medal game was a rematch against Russia. In the first game, the USA team dominated almost from the beginning, but in the rematch, the team from Russia took the early lead and led much of the way. With under two minutes remaining, the USA was down by two points but the USA responded, then held on to win the gold medal 71–65. Williams averaged 12.3 points per game, second highest on the team, and averaged 9.6 rebounds per game, highest on the team.

Williams won an Olympic Gold Medal as a member of the U.S. women's basketball team during the 2000 Summer Olympics in Sydney, Australia.

In 2002, Williams was named to the national team which competed in the World Championships in Zhangjiagang, Changzhou and Nanjing, China. The team was coached by Van Chancellor. The USA team won all nine games, including a close title game against Russia, which was a one-point game late in the game. Williams averaged 5.9 points per game.

== Outside basketball ==
In 2002, she opened a restaurant called Natalie's in Salt Lake City, Utah. She carried the Olympic Torch in the Salt Lake City area prior to the 2002 Winter Olympics. She also was named to the United States 2002 World Championship Games team.

She considers Cheryl Miller as her basketball role model.

== Personal life ==
Williams' daughter, Nation, is a five-star basketball recruit, and one of the top-ranked players in the 2027 class.

== Career statistics ==
Legend
GP	Games played	GS	Games started	MPG	Minutes per game	RPG	Rebounds per game
APG	Assists per game	SPG	Steals per game	BPG	Blocks per game	PPG	Points per game
TO	Turnovers per game	FG%	Field-goal percentage	3P%	3-point field-goal percentage	FT%	Free-throw percentage
**Bold**	Career best	°	League leader

=== Regular season ===
Year	Team	GP	GS	MPG	FG%	3P%	FT%	RPG	APG	SPG	BPG	TO	PPG
1999	Utah	28	26	34.1	**.519**	.000	.754	9.2	0.9	**1.4**	**0.8**	2.4	18.0
2000	Utah	29	29	**35.8**	.490	**.600**	**.798**	**11.6**	**1.8**	1.2	0.6	2.7	**18.7**
2001	Utah	31	31	34.3	.490	.000	.729	9.9	**1.8**	1.3	0.3	2.3	14.2
2002	Utah	31	31	32.5	.435	.417	.742	8.2	1.2	1.2	0.5	2.3	11.3
2003	Indiana	**34**	**34**	31.0	.485	.000	.709	7.5	1.4	1.3	0.6	2.1	13.4
2004	Indiana	**34**	**34**	28.1	.454	.000	.697	6.9	**1.8**	1.2	0.7	1.9	10.3
2005	Indiana	**34**	**34**	23.6	.415	.000	.672	5.5	0.9	1.0	0.4	**1.7**	7.4
Career	7 years, 2 teams	221	219	31.1	.474	.286	.741	8.3	1.4	1.2	0.6	2.1	13.1

=== Playoffs ===
Year	Team	GP	GS	MPG	FG%	3P%	FT%	RPG	APG	SPG	BPG	TO	PPG
2001	Utah	2	2	28.5	.500		**.833**	8.0	0.0	**1.5**	0.5	2.5	10.5
2002	Utah	**5**	**5**	**37.2**	**.532**	**.250**	.679	**9.2**	1.4	1.0	**1.4**	1.6	**14.0**
2005	Indiana	4	4	33.5	.425	.000	.813	7.5	**1.5**	1.3	0.5	**0.3**	11.8
Career	3 years, 2 teams	11	11	34.3	.485	.200	.740	8.4	1.2	1.2	0.9	1.3	12.5
