= LBS Financial Credit Union Pyramid =

Arena at California State University, Long Beach

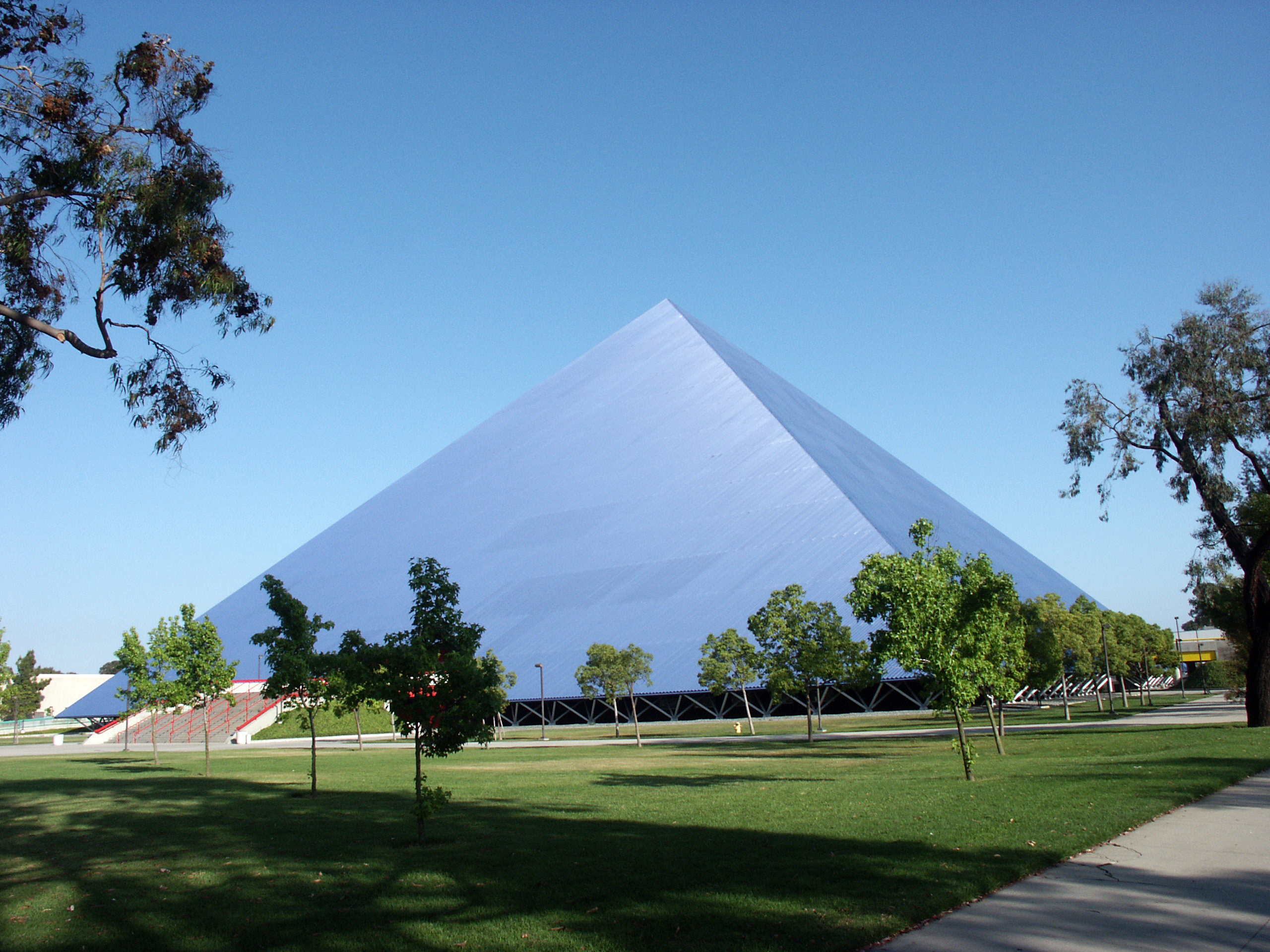
- The venue in 2006
- Interactive map of LBS Financial Credit Union Pyramid
- Full name: LBS Financial Credit Union Pyramid
- Former names: Walter Pyramid; Long Beach Pyramid
- Address: Long Beach, CA; United States
- Location: 1250 Bellflower Boulevard; Long Beach, CA 90840
- Coordinates: 33°47′14″N 118°6′51″W
- Owner: California State University, Long Beach
- Operator: Long Beach State athletics
- Capacity: 4,200
- Type: Arena
- Surface: Beech
- Scoreboard: Yes
- Record attendance: 6,912 (men's basketball vs. North Carolina, November 16, 2012)
- Current use: Basketball; Volleyball

Construction
- Groundbreaking: December 17, 1992
- Opened: November 30, 1994; 31 years ago
- Cost: $23 million ($47.8 million in 2025 dollars)
- Architect: Don Gibbs
- Structural engineers: John A. Martin & Associates
- General contractor: Nielson Construction Company

Tenants
- Long Beach State athletics (NCAA) teams: men's and women's basketball; men's and women's volleyball

Website
- longbeachstate.com/walter-pyramid

The LBS Financial Credit Union Pyramid, formerly known as Walter Pyramid and The Long Beach Pyramid, is a 4,000-seat, pyramid-shaped indoor arena on the campus of California State University, Long Beach in Long Beach, California.

It serves as home venue to the University's men's and women's basketball teams and men's and women's volleyball teams.

== History ==
The Walter Pyramid was officially opened on November 30, 1994, when it hosted a Long Beach State men's basketball game against the Detroit Titans, which aired live on ESPN. A standing-room only crowd of 5,021 saw Long Beach come away victorious with a final score of 71-64.

The Walter Pyramid was designed by Don Gibbs and built by the Nielson Construction Company of San Diego. The building of Walter Pyramid cost approximately $22 million. Each side of the perimeter of Walter Pyramid measures 345 feet (105 m), and it is 190 feet (58 m) tall. It is one of only four mathematically true pyramid-style buildings in the United States, the others being the Summum Pyramid in Salt Lake City, Utah, Luxor Las Vegas in Las Vegas, Nevada, and the Memphis Pyramid in Memphis, Tennessee.

The Walter Pyramid rises 18 stories above the Long Beach skyline, and its exterior is uniformly clad in sheets of dark-blue corrugated aluminum.

=== Name changes ===
On March 5, 2005, Long Beach State officially renamed The Pyramid to Walter Pyramid in honor of Mike and Arline Walter. The Walters were given this recognition for a $2.1 million donation given to the university. In addition to being the vice-president of Levi Strauss & Co., Mike Walter was also a dean for Long Beach State's College of Business Administration from 1993 to 2000.

On November 19, 2025, due to the finalization of naming rights from the LBS Financial Credit Union, the CSU Board of Trustees voted to change the name of the Walter Pyramid to the LBS Financial Credit Union Pyramid.

== Tenants ==
=== University athletics ===
The Walter Pyramid is currently home to the Long Beach State Beach men's basketball and Long Beach State Beach women's basketball programs, as well as the Long Beach State Beach men's volleyball and Long Beach State Beach women's volleyball programs. All LBSU teams playing home games in the Walter Pyramid are nicknamed "the Beach". The teams were previously known as the 49ers but that nickname was recently dropped. Prior to the construction of the Walter Pyramid on campus, the men's basketball team played some of their games in the Long Beach Arena in downtown Long Beach, and at the on-campus University Gymnasium later renamed Gold Mine, which has just 1,900 seats.

In addition to being the home for Long Beach State athletics, the Walter Pyramid has hosted several NCAA-sponsored events including numerous women's volleyball NCAA matches, the 2001 and 2003 NCAA Men's Volleyball Championships and the 2003 NCAA Women's Volleyball Regionals.

=== Non-university athletics ===
The Southern California Summer Pro League used the Walter Pyramid during the summer months from 1995 to 2007. The league showcased current and prospective NBA basketball players, including recent draft picks, current NBA players working on their skills and conditioning, and international professionals hoping to become NBA players. The league went on hiatus for the 2008 season and announced its intention to move to Los Angeles for 2009.

The Walter Pyramid was home to the Long Beach Stingrays, a women's professional basketball team of the now-defunct American Basketball League for a time in 1997 and 1998.

The Walter Pyramid hosts the World Brazilian Jiu-Jitsu Championships or, in Portuguese language, Mundials.

New Japan Pro-Wrestling presented the show Strong Style Evolved on March 25, 2018, which sold out within minutes. In 2019, they held the finals of the Super J-Cup. The company returned to the venue on May 21 2023, presenting Resurgence.

The Los Angeles Sparks played Game 3 of the 2019 WNBA Playoffs semifinals at the Walter Pyramid, where they lost 94-68 against the Connecticut Sun. The Sparks return to the Pyramid to play their first 5 home games of the 2024 season while Stage 3 of upgrades was being implemented at their main arena.

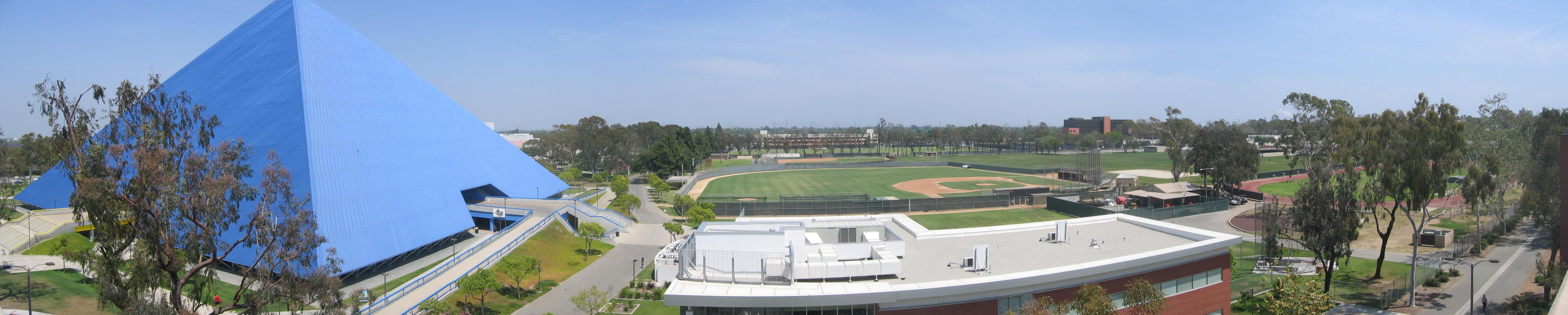
A panoramic view of Walter Pyramid on the campus of California State University, Long Beach

== See also ==
- List of NCAA Division I basketball arenas
