= Dawn Staley =

American basketball player and coach (born 1970)

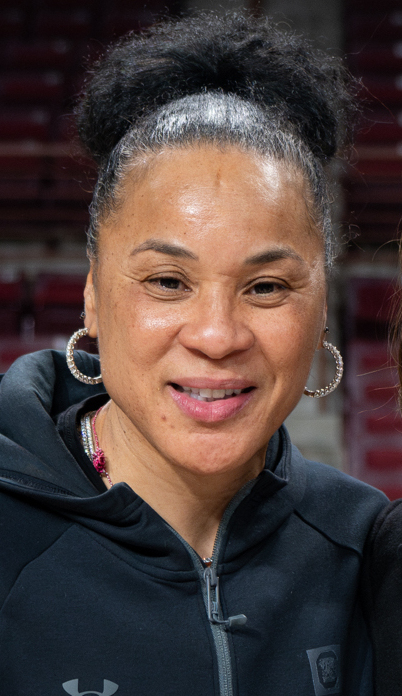
- Staley at Colonial Life Arena in 2024

South Carolina Gamecocks
- Title: Head coach
- League: Southeastern Conference

Personal information
- Born: May 4, 1970 (age 56) Philadelphia, Pennsylvania, U.S.
- Listed height: 5 ft 6 in (1.68 m)

Career information
- High school: Dobbins Tech (Philadelphia, Pennsylvania)
- College: Virginia (1988–1992)
- WNBA draft: 1999: 1st round, 9th overall pick
- Drafted by: Charlotte Sting
- Playing career: 1996–2006
- Position: Point guard
- Number: 5
- Coaching career: 2000–present

Career history

Playing
- 1994–1995: Tarbes Gespe Bigorre
- 1996–1998: Richmond / Philadelphia Rage
- 1999–2005: Charlotte Sting
- 2005–2006: Houston Comets

Career highlights
- As player: 6× WNBA All-Star (2001–2006); WNBA Three-Point Shootout champion (2006); WNBA Skills Challenge champion (2003); WNBA anniversary teams (10th, 15th); 2× ABL All-Star (1997, 1998); 2× USA Basketball Female Athlete of the Year (1994, 2004); NCAA Tournament MOP (1991); 2× ACC Female Athlete of the Year (1991, 1992); ACC Tournament MVP (1992); 2× Honda Sports Award (1991, 1992); Honda-Broderick Cup (1991); 2× Naismith College Player of the Year (1991, 1992); 2× WBCA Player of the Year (1991, 1992); 2× USBWA Player of the Year (1991, 1992); 2× ACC Player of the Year (1991, 1992); 3× Kodak All-American (1990–1992); 2× All-American – USBWA (1991, 1992); 3× First-team All-ACC (1990–1992); ACC Rookie of the Year (1989); As coach: 3× NCAA Division I tournament champion (2017, 2022, 2024); 8× NCAA Division I regional champion – Final Four (2015, 2017, 2021–2026); 9× SEC tournament champion (2015–2018, 2020–2021, 2023–2025); 10× SEC regular season champion (2014–2017, 2020, 2022–2026); 4× Naismith Coach of the Year (2020, 2022–2024); 4× WBCA National Coach of the Year (2020, 2022–2024); 2× AP National Coach of the Year (2020, 2024); The Sporting News National Coach of the Year (2024); 4× USBWA National Coach of the Year (2020, 2022–2024); 7× SEC Coach of the Year (2014–2016, 2020, 2022–2024); 4× A-10 tournament champion (2002, 2004–2006); 3× A-10 regular-season champion (2004, 2005, 2008); 2× A-10 Coach of the Year (2004, 2005)
- Stats at WNBA.com
- Stats at Basketball Reference
- Basketball Hall of Fame
- Women's Basketball Hall of Fame
- FIBA Hall of Fame
Medals
Women's basketball
Representing the United States
Olympic Games
Gold medal – first place	1996 Atlanta	Team
Gold medal – first place	2000 Sydney	Team
Gold medal – first place	2004 Athens	Team
World Cup
Gold medal – first place	1998 Germany	Team
Gold medal – first place	2002 China	Team
Bronze medal – third place	1994 Australia	Team
Universiade
Gold medal – first place	1991 Sheffield	Team
Head coach for the United States
Olympic Games
Gold medal – first place	2020 Tokyo	Team
World Cup
Gold medal – first place	2018 Spain	Team
FIBA AmeriCup
Gold medal – first place	2019 San Juan	Team
Gold medal – first place	2021 San Juan	Team
Pan American Games
Gold medal – first place	2007 Rio	Team
U19 World Championship
Gold medal – first place	2015 Chekhov	Team
FIBA U18 Americas Championship
Gold medal – first place	2014 Colorado Springs	Team

Dawn Michelle Staley (born May 4, 1970) is an American basketball coach and former player who is the head coach for the South Carolina Gamecocks women's basketball team. A point guard, she played college basketball for the Virginia Cavaliers and spent eight seasons in the Women's National Basketball Association (WNBA), primarily with the Charlotte Sting. Staley also played on the United States women's national basketball team, winning three gold medals at the Olympic Games from 1996 to 2004, and was the head coach of the team that won an Olympic gold medal in 2021. She is the only person to win the Naismith Award as both a player and a coach and is considered one of the greatest coaches in the sport.

During her college career with Virginia from 1988 to 1992, Staley set the NCAA record for steals, the school record for points, and the ACC record for assists. She played professionally in the American Basketball League (ABL) during its three years of operation before being selected ninth overall by the Sting in the 1999 WNBA draft. As a member of the Sting and the Houston Comets, she received six consecutive WNBA All-Star selections from 2001 to her final season in 2006. Staley spent most of her WNBA career simultaneously serving as the head coach of the Temple Owls women's basketball team from 2000 to 2008, leading them to six NCAA tournaments, three regular-season conference championships, and four conference tournament titles.

After becoming South Carolina's head coach in 2008, Staley rebuilt the Gamecocks into one of the top women's basketball programs. During her 16 seasons, she has led South Carolina to nine NCAA tournaments, five championship game appearances (including three consecutive from 2024 and 2026), and three titles, including the program's first in 2017 and a perfect season in 2024. Staley was inducted into the Women's Basketball Hall of Fame in 2012, and has been inducted into the Naismith Basketball Hall of Fame twice: in 2013 for her individual playing career, and in 2026 as a member of the 1996 United States women's Olympic basketball team.

== Early life ==
Staley's parents, Clarence and Estelle Staley, moved to North Philadelphia from Orangeburg County, South Carolina in the 1950s, when they were still teenagers. They married young and in 1967 moved into a three-bedroom, single-bath row house in the Raymond Rosen Homes housing project. Together, Clarence, a part-time carpenter, and Estelle, a homemaker, raised five children—three boys, Lawrence, Anthony and Eric, and two girls, Tracey and Dawn. Fearful of her disciplinarian mother, who was of faith and would not spare the rod, Staley knew to "abide by her rules, you lived clean. You're good. You live a happy life".

== Playing career ==
=== High school years ===
Staley was named the national high school player of the year during her final season at Murrell Dobbins Vocational High School in Philadelphia.

=== College years ===
Staley attended the University of Virginia (UVA) in Charlottesville, Virginia, where she was a first-generation college student and earned her degree in Rhetoric and Communication Studies. During her four seasons in college, she led her team to four NCAA tournaments, three Final Fours and one national championship game. She was named the ACC female athlete of the year and the national player of the year in 1991 and 1992. Staley finished her college career with 2,135 points and held the NCAA record for career steals with 454 (which has since been broken by current record holder, Natalie White). She finished her career at Virginia as the school's all-time scoring leader and as the ACC's all-time leader in assists at 729, but those records have since been broken by former UVA stars Monica Wright and Sharnee Zoll. Her number 24 is retired at UVA.

=== Overseas Pro Career ===
In 1994–1995, after graduation, Staley played professional basketball in France in Tarbes, Italy, Brazil, and Spain before joining the ABL and then the WNBA.

=== USA Basketball ===
Staley was named to the USA Basketball Women's Junior National Team (now called the U19 team). The team participated in the second Junior World Championship, held in Bilbao, Spain, in July 1989. Team USA lost their opening game to South Korea in overtime, then lost a two-point game to Australia. After defeating Bulgaria, Team USA lost another close game, this time to Czechoslovakia by three points. The team followed that loss with a victory against Zaire, but dropped its final game to Spain, again by three points. Staley averaged 10.8 points per game and recorded 14 steals over the course of the event, both second highest on the team. The Americans finished the tournament in seventh place.

Staley was named to the team representing the United States at the World University Games held during July 1991 in Sheffield, England. While the American team had won gold in 1983, they finished with the silver in 1985, in fifth place in 1987, and did not field a team in 1989. The team was coached by Tara VanDerveer of Stanford. After winning opening games easily, Team USA faced China in the medal round. The Americans shot only 36% from the field, but limited the Chinese to just 35%, and advanced to the gold medal game by a score of 79–76. There they faced Spain, who had won all seven of their previous tournament games. However, Team USA defeated them easily, 88–62, to claim the gold medal. Staley averaged 4.9 points per game for the tournament.

Staley competed with USA Basketball as a member of the 1992 Jones Cup Team that won the Gold in Taipei.

Staley played for Team USA throughout her career. In 1994 she competed in the World Championships and was named the USA Basketball Female Athlete of the Year. She led the 1996 team to an undefeated record of 8–0 and the gold medal at the 1996 Atlanta Summer Olympics. She was also a member of the 2000 Olympic team that defended the gold medal.

Staley was selected to represent the United States at the 1995 USA Women's Pan American Games, but only four teams committed to participate, so the event was cancelled.

Staley was named to the United States national team in 1998. The national team traveled to Berlin, Germany, in July and August 1998 for the FIBA World Championships. Team USA won a close opening game against Japan, 95–89, then won their next six games easily. In the semifinal game against Brazil, Team USA was behind as much as ten points in the first half, but went on to win, 93–79. The gold medal game was a rematch against Russia. In the first game, the Americans dominated almost from the beginning, but in the rematch, Russia took the early lead and led much of the way. With under two minutes remaining, Team USA was down by two points, but rallied and then held on to win the gold medal by a score of 71–65. Staley hit two free throws with ten seconds left to extend a three-point lead to five, then hit another free throw with three seconds left in the game to seal the 71–65 victory. Staley averaged 7.0 points per game and made a record 52 assists.

In 2002, Staley was named to the national team which competed in the World Championships in Zhangjiagang, Changzhou and Nanjing, China. The team was coached by Van Chancellor. Staley scored 4.9 points per game, and recorded a team-high 24 assists. Team USA won all nine games, including a close title game against Russia, with the teams separated by only one point late in the game.

She won a third gold medal with Team USA at the 2004 Games in Athens. Her Olympic performance led to her being named 2004 USA Basketball Female Athlete Of The Year at the end of the year. Before the Games, she was selected to carry the flag of the United States during the parade of nations at the opening ceremony.

=== ABL ===
In 1996, she joined the Richmond Rage of the American Basketball League (ABL) and led the team to the ABL finals in 1997. The following season, the team moved to Staley's hometown of Philadelphia. Staley was named the 1996–97 All-ABL first team and the All-ABL second team, the following season.

=== WNBA ===
In the 1999 WNBA draft, Staley was selected with the ninth overall pick by the Charlotte Sting. In 2001, she led the Sting to the championship game of the WNBA playoffs.

On August 1, 2005, Staley was traded to the Houston Comets. Staley announced before the start of the WNBA season that she would be retiring after the Comets' season was over. The Comets made the playoffs and faced the Sacramento Monarchs in the first round. The Monarchs swept the Comets and won the series 2–0, ending Staley's career. In 2011, she was voted in by fans as one of the top 15 players in the 15-year history of the WNBA.

== Coaching career ==
=== Temple Owls (2000–2008) ===
Staley had no interest in coaching when she was initially approached by the athletic director of Temple University, Dave O'Brien. She was on the Olympic team at the time which was attending the Final Four in Philadelphia. O'Brien, mindful that Staley was a Philadelphia native and star basketball player at Philadelphia's Dobbins Technical High School, talked her into visiting the campus, where she was guided to a conference room with a dozen people who were treating her visit as a job interview. When they asked her if she saw herself as a coach she replied "no, not at all". She initially resisted offers to become the coach. O'Brien changed his tactics and challenged her to identify some ways to turn the program around. She was still playing in the WNBA at the time and her friends told her it would be impossible to continue to play and coach. That challenge convinced her she should give coaching a try, and accepted the position of head coach at Temple. In her first season, 2000–01, Temple advanced to the WNIT. In 2001, 2002 and 2004, her teams won the Atlantic 10 tournament to qualify for the NCAA tournament.

In the 2004–05 season, Staley's Owls went 28–4, including a perfect 19–0 against Atlantic 10 opponents. However, they lost in the second round of the NCAA Tournament to Rutgers University. Staley reached the 100-win plateau in the A-10 semifinals vs Xavier University that season, becoming the fastest coach in women's basketball to achieve that feat.

On May 7, 2008, it was confirmed by Temple University that Staley would leave Temple for the recently vacated coaching position at the University of South Carolina. She left Temple with the best overall record of 172–80, along with six NCAA appearances and four Atlantic 10 titles.

=== South Carolina Gamecocks (2008–present) ===
At South Carolina, Staley started rebuilding a program from scratch, suffering through two losing seasons at the start of her tenure. Starting with 10 wins during the 2008–09 season, she led the program to ever better finishes in each subsequent season, leading to the program's first number 1 ranking and Final Four appearance during the 2014–15 season. They picked up where they left off a year later, going undefeated in SEC play; however, they were upended in the Sweet 16 by Syracuse.

In 2016–17, the Gamecocks repeated as SEC regular-season and tournament champions for the third year in a row, and advanced to the second Final Four in school history. They defeated conference rival Mississippi State in the national championship game to win the first national title in school history. Staley became the second African American to lead a women's basketball team to a national championship; Carolyn Peck had coached Purdue to the 1999 national championship. After the 2017 win, The Post and Courier listed Staley first in their ranking of the 25 most powerful people in South Carolina sports.

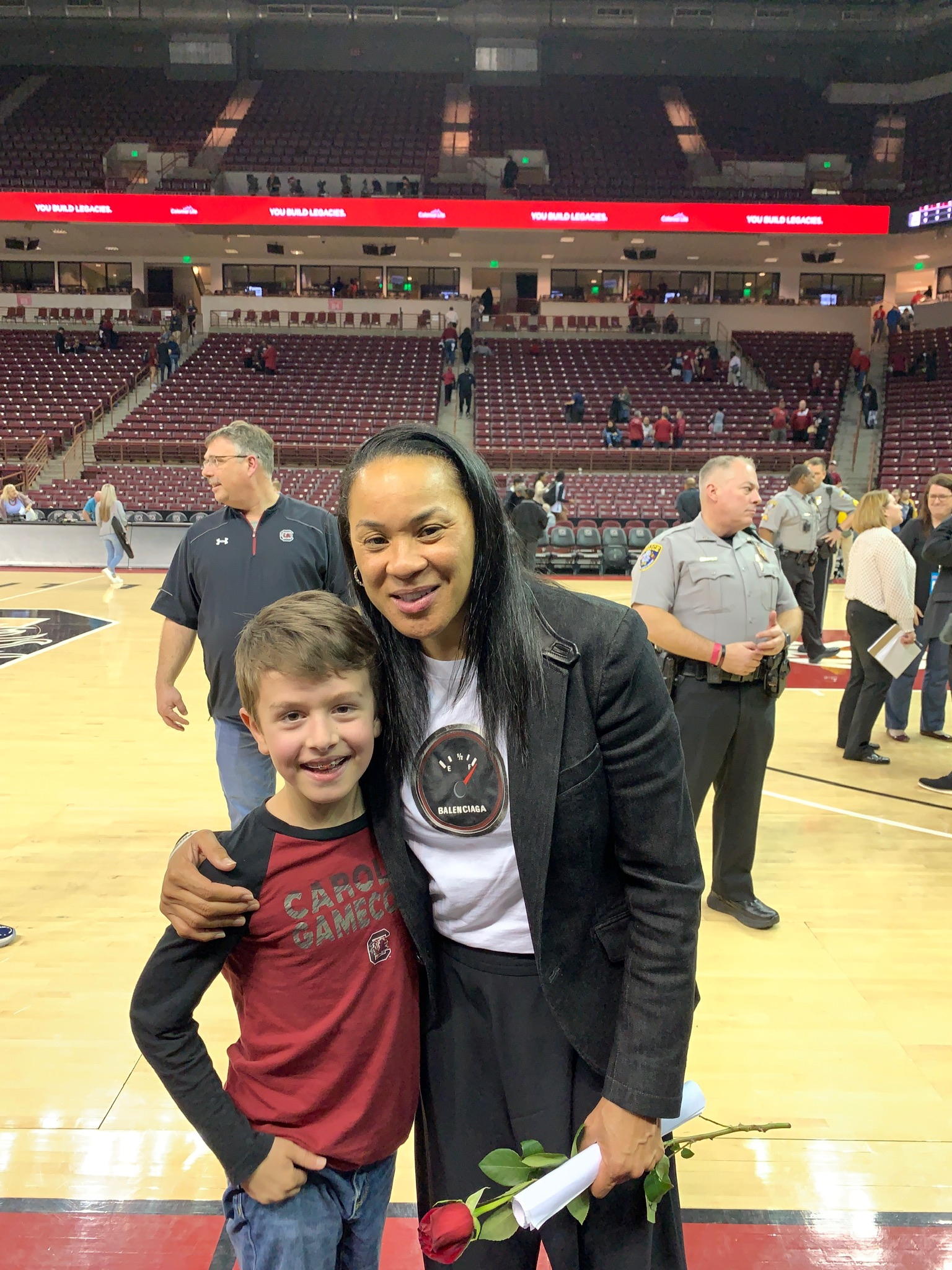
Coach Staley with a young fan after the February 13, 2020, win over Auburn

Under Staley the program has captured nine SEC regular season championships, nine SEC tournament titles, six Final Fours, three NCAA national championships, twelve Sweet Sixteen appearances, five SEC player of the year awards and five SEC freshman of the year awards. Staley herself has been awarded SEC coach of the year five times.

In 2020, Staley led the Gamecocks to a 32–1 season, winning yet another SEC regular season, and tournament championship. The Gamecocks finished #1 in both major polls before the NCAA tournament was cancelled. Staley swept the national coach of the year awards in 2020; she is the first person to win the Naismith award as a player and also as a coach.

In 2021, Staley led her team to a third Final Four, before losing a controversial game to Stanford 66–65. Staley's Gamecocks signed the #1 class for the then-upcoming 2021–22 season. On October 15, 2021, Staley signed a seven-year, $22.4 million contract extension with South Carolina, making her the highest-paid Black college basketball coach in the country.

In 2022 the Gamecocks were #1 in both polls for the entire season, they would go on to defeat 14 ranked teams, including Stanford, UConn, NC State, Oregon, Maryland, Duke, LSU, Tennessee and Georgia. In the NCAA tournament, the Gamecocks defeated Howard, Miami, North Carolina, Creighton, Louisville, and then UConn again to win a second national championship. Staley is the first coach to defeat Geno Auriemma, Tara VanDerveer and Kim Mulkey in the same season. Staley was again named Naismith Award winner, and coached the National Player of the Year Aliyah Boston.

In 2022, following an alleged racist incident by a Brigham Young University fan against a member of the Duke women's volleyball team, Staley canceled the team's matchups against BYU in the 2022–23 and 2023–24 seasons. Despite an investigation that did not find evidence to corroborate the claim, Staley declined to reinstate the series.

Staley won her 600th game on February 22, 2024, in 786 games (534 at South Carolina).

In 2024, Staley guided the team to a perfect 38–0 season, winning their third national title. Staley won her fourth Naismith Coach of the Year Award.

Staley was among 2025's 20 most admired leaders in sports, according to The New York Times (The Athletic). Eddie George described Staley as 'transcending' sports, noting, "the best leaders in every arena look to her for wisdom, perspective and guidance".

=== USA Basketball ===
Dawn Staley served as an assistant coach for the USA national team in 2006. Lisa Leslie, who had led the team in scoring in the 2004 Olympics, the 2002 World Championships, the 2000 Olympics, the 1998 World Championships, and the 1996 Olympics was no longer on the team. Sheryl Swoopes was available but hampered by injuries, with Staley transitioning from player to coach. Newcomers Sue Bird, Candace Parker and Diana Taurasi picked up the slack, but it was a team in transition. As an additional challenge, some members of the squad were unable to join the team for practices due to WNBA commitments. The team started out strong, winning each of the six preliminary games, including the game against Russia. In the quarterfinals, the USA team beat Spain 90–56. The semifinal was a rematch against Russia, but this time the Russian team prevailed, 75–68. The USA faced Brazil in the bronze medal game, and won easily 99–59.

During the 2008 Summer Olympics in Beijing, China, Staley served as an assistant coach under Team USA head coach Anne Donovan and helped the Americans win their fourth straight gold medal in women's basketball and sixth in their past seven Olympic appearances.

After coaching Team USA to a gold medal at the 2007 Pan Am games, she served as head coach to the U17 Team in 2014 and the U19 Team in 2015, winning gold medals at the U18 Americas Championship and the U19 FIBA World Championship. The USA basketball organization awarded her the code national coach of the year award as a result of the U19 gold medal. She shared the award with Sean Miller who coached the U19 men's team to a gold medal.

She served as an assistant coach under Team USA head coach Geno Auriemma for the 2016 Summer Olympics in Rio de Janeiro, Brazil, and helped the Americans win their sixth straight gold medal in women's basketball and eighth in their past nine Olympic appearances.

On March 10, 2017, she was named head coach of USA national women's team.

At the 2020 Summer Olympics, Staley won her first gold medal as Team USA's Head coach, winning all six games and extending her record to 45–0. Staley also coached Team USA to a gold medal in the 2018 World Cup in Spain and two gold medals in the 2019 and 2021 FIBA AmeriCups.

== Awards and honors ==
Staley ranked number 2 on the Post and Courier Columbia's 2025 Power List.

NCAA (Player)

- 1991 – Winner of the Honda Sports Award for basketball
- 1991 – WBCA Player of the Year
- 1991 – Naismith College Player of the Year
- 1991 – USBWA Women's National Player of the Year
- 1991 – The Honda-Broderick Cup winner for all sports
- 1992 – Winner of the Honda Sports Award for basketball
- 1992 – WBCA Player of the Year
- 1992 – Naismith College Player of the Year
- 1992 – USBWA Women's National Player of the Year

NCAA (Coach)

- 2014 – SEC Coach of the Year
- 2015 – SEC Co-Coach of the Year
- 2016 – SEC Coach of the Year
- 2020 – SEC Coach of the Year
- 2020 – Naismith College Coach of the Year
- 2020 – USBWA National Coach of the Year
- 2020 – AP National Coach of the Year
- 2020 – WBCA National Coach of the Year
- 2022 – SEC Coach of the Year
- 2022 – USBWA Women's National Coach of the Year
- 2022 – Naismith College Coach of the Year
- 2022 – WBCA National Coach of the Year
- 2023 – SEC Coach of the Year
- 2023 – USA Today Woman of the Year
- 2023 – USBWA Women's National Coach of the Year
- 2023 – Naismith College Coach of the Year
- 2023 – WBCA National Coach of the Year
- 2024 – SEC Coach of the Year
- 2024 – The Athletic Coach of the Year
- 2024 – USBWA Women's National Coach of the Year
- 2024 – The Sporting News National Coach of the Year
- 2024 – Naismith College Coach of the Year
- 2024 – AP National Coach of the Year
- 2024 – WBCA National Coach of the Year
- 2024 – Jimmy V Award

Halls of Fame

- 2008 – Inducted into the Virginia Sports Hall of Fame
- 2012 – Inducted into the Women's Basketball Hall of Fame

State/local

- 2013 – Awarded the Order of the Palmetto
- 2017 – Omicron Delta Kappa faculty/staff initiate at the University of South Carolina
- 2025 - Daniel Rickenmann, mayor of Columbia, South Carolina, declared the month of May "Dawn Staley Month."
- 2025 - Statue of Staley unveiled in Columbia, South Carolina, at the intersection of Senate Street and Lincoln Street outside the Pastides Alumni Center.

National

- 2015 – USA Basketball Co-National Coach of the Year
- 2021 – USA Basketball Co-National Coach of the year

== Career statistics ==
=== College ===
Legend
GP	Games played	GS	Games started	MPG	Minutes per game
FG%	Field goal percentage	3P%	3-point field goal percentage	FT%	Free throw percentage
RPG	Rebounds per game	APG	Assists per game	SPG	Steals per game
BPG	Blocks per game	PPG	Points per game	**Bold**	Career high

Year	Team	GP	Points	FG%	3P%	FT%	RPG	APG	SPG	BPG	PPG
1989	Virginia	31	**574**	45.7%	**35.5%**	**83.1%**	5.1	4.6	3.3	0.3	**18.5**
1990	Virginia	32	**574**	45.2%	34.6%	78.1%	**6.7**	4.4	3.2	**0.5**	17.9
1991	Virginia	**34**	495	45.0%	32.4%	82.4%	6.1	**6.9**	**3.9**	0.3	14.6
1992	Virginia	**34**	492	**48.4%**	30.3%	80.8%	5.6	6.1	3.4	**0.5**	14.5
Career		131	2135	46.0%	33.4%	81.1%	5.9	5.6	3.5	0.4	16.3

=== WNBA ===
Legend
GP	Games played	GS	Games started	MPG	Minutes per game	RPG	Rebounds per game
APG	Assists per game	SPG	Steals per game	BPG	Blocks per game	PPG	Points per game
TO	Turnovers per game	FG%	Field-goal percentage	3P%	3-point field-goal percentage	FT%	Free-throw percentage
**Bold**	Career best	°	League leader

==== Regular season ====
Year	Team	GP	GS	MPG	FG%	3P%	FT%	RPG	APG	SPG	BPG	TO	PPG
1999	Charlotte	32	32	33.3	.415	.317	**.934**	2.3	5.5	1.2	0.1	2.81	**11.5**
2000	Charlotte	32	32	34.3	.372	.330	.878	**2.4**	**5.9**	1.2	0.0	2.84	8.8
2001	Charlotte	32	32	**36.0**	.381	.371	.895	2.2	5.6	**1.6**	0.0	3.13	9.3
2002	Charlotte	32	32	33.2	.364	.398	.762	1.8	5.1	1.5	0.0	2.50	8.7
2003	Charlotte	**34**	**34**	31.9	.417	.389	.836	1.7	5.1	1.4	0.1	2.29	7.9
2004	Charlotte	**34**	**34**	33.6	**.431**	.407	.759	1.7	5.0	1.3	0.1	2.18	8.9
2005*	Charlotte	23	23	29.7	.405	.405	.767	2.3	5.3	1.3	0.0	1.83	6.3
2005*	Houston	10	3	22.1	.357	.286	.900	1.7	2.8	0.6	0.1	1.20	3.3
2005	Totals	33	26	27.4	.396	.375	.800	2.1	4.5	1.1	0.0	**1.64**	5.4
2006	Houston	**34**	**34**	29.9	.420	**.427**	.806	2.2	3.9	1.0	**0.2**	2.24	7.4
Career	8 years, 2 teams	263	256	32.4	.399	.376	.824	2.0	5.1	1.3	0.1	2.44	7.5

==== Playoffs ====
Year	Team	GP	GS	MPG	FG%	3P%	FT%	RPG	APG	SPG	BPG	TO	PPG
1999	Charlotte	4	4	**39.3**	.325	.438	.833	1.3	**5.8**	0.8	0.0	2.75	**12.0**
2001	Charlotte	**8**	**8**	37.6	.416	.500	.810	2.3	4.4	1.1	**0.3**	4.25	11.8
2002	Charlotte	2	2	39.0	.286	.200	.500	**2.5**	5.0	1.5	0.0	2.00	8.5
2003	Charlotte	2	2	29.0	.353	**.500**	.400	**2.5**	3.5	**2.0**	0.0	2.00	9.0
2005	Houston	5	0	25.0	**.462**	.375	**.857**	0.8	2.8	1.8	0.0	**1.40**	4.2
2006	Houston	2	2	20.0	.143	.333	.000	**2.5**	1.0	0.0	0.0	2.00	1.5
Career	6 years, 2 teams	23	18	33.0	.366	.423	.754	1.8	4.0	1.2	0.1	2.78	8.7

=== Head coaching record ===
Record table
Season	Team	Overall	Conference	Standing	Postseason
**Temple Owls** (Atlantic 10 Conference) (2000–2008)
2000–01	Temple	19–11	11–5	3rd	WNIT First Round
2001–02	Temple	20–11	12–4	T–1st (East)	NCAA First Round
2002–03	Temple	14–15	9–7	2nd (East)	
2003–04	Temple	21–10	14–2	1st (East)	NCAA First Round
2004–05	Temple	28–4	16–0	1st (East)	NCAA Second Round
2005–06	Temple	24–8	12–4	3rd	NCAA First Round
2006–07	Temple	25–8	13–1	2nd	NCAA Second Round
2007–08	Temple	21–13	12–2	T–1st	NCAA First Round
Temple:		172–80 (.683)	99–25 (.798)		
**South Carolina Gamecocks** (Southeastern Conference) (2008–present)
2008–09	South Carolina	10–18	2–12	11th	
2009–10	South Carolina	14–15	7–9	T–7th	
2010–11	South Carolina	18–15	8–8	T–5th	WNIT Second Round
2011–12	South Carolina	25–10	10–6	T–4th	NCAA Sweet Sixteen
2012–13	South Carolina	25–8	11–5	T–4th	NCAA Second Round
2013–14	South Carolina	29–5	14–2	1st	NCAA Sweet Sixteen
2014–15	South Carolina	34–3	15–1	T–1st	NCAA Final Four
2015–16	South Carolina	33–2	16–0	1st	NCAA Sweet Sixteen
2016–17	South Carolina	33–4	14–2	1st	**NCAA Champions**
2017–18	South Carolina	29–7	12–4	T–2nd	NCAA Elite Eight
2018–19	South Carolina	23–10	13–3	2nd	NCAA Sweet Sixteen
2019–20	South Carolina	32–1	16–0	1st	Tournament canceled - COVID-19
2020–21	South Carolina	26–5	14–2	2nd	NCAA Final Four
2021–22	South Carolina	35–2	15–1	1st	**NCAA Champions**
2022–23	South Carolina	36–1	16–0	1st	NCAA Final Four
2023–24	South Carolina	38–0	16–0	1st	**NCAA Champions**
2024–25	South Carolina	35–4	15–1	T–1st	NCAA Runner-up
2025–26	South Carolina	36–4	15–1	1st	NCAA Runner-up
2026–27	South Carolina	0–0	0–0		
South Carolina:		511–113 (.819)	229–57 (.801)		
Total:		683–193 (.780)			
National champion Postseason invitational champion Conference regular season champion Conference regular season and conference tournament champion Division regular season champion Division regular season and conference tournament champion Conference tournament champion

== Personal life ==
Staley is a Christian and routinely thanks God after games. On Easter Sunday 2024, Staley said postgame "He is risen" referring to the resurrection of Jesus Christ. After her team won the 2024 National title, Staley thanked Jesus.

Staley heads the Dawn Staley Foundation, which focuses on academics and athletics and sponsors basketball leagues and other fund-raising activities.

Staley hosted a podcast, Netlife, produced by Just Women's Sports, beginning in January 2022.

Staley owns a Havanese dog named Champ, who has his own Twitter account, and frequently visits practices.

Staley is a fan of the NFL's Philadelphia Eagles. Throughout the 2022 NFL season, Staley was often seen wearing their jerseys while coaching the Gamecocks.

== Book ==
- Staley, Dawn (2025). Uncommon Favor: Basketball, North Philly, My Mother, and the Life Lessons I Learned from All Three. New York: Black Privilege Publishing/Atria. ISBN 978-1668023365

== See also ==
- List of college women's basketball career coaching wins leaders

Olympic Games
Preceded by Amy Peterson	Flagbearer for United States; Athens 2004	Succeeded by Chris Witty
