= Alisha Valavanis =

American businesswoman

Seattle Storm
- Positions: President & CEO
- League: WNBA

Personal information
- Born: Valparaiso, Indiana, United States

Career information
- College: Chico State University
- Playing career: 1995–present

Career history
- 1995–2000: Chico State Wildcats

Alisha Valavanis is an American businesswoman who is the current president and CEO of the WNBA team Seattle Storm.

== Early life ==
Alisha Valavanis was born in Valparaiso, Indiana, United States, to parents Debbie Hamre and Spero Valavanis. She started playing basketball at age 4. She has a twin sister named Alexa Benson-Valavanis, with whom she played basketball growing up.

Her father, Spero Valavanis, was the lead architect on the Seattle Storm's training facility, the team that she now leads.

== College career ==
Valavanis was recruited alongside her sister Alexa to play basketball at Chico State University for the Wildcats by then-head coach Mary Anne Lazzarini. She played at CSU from 1995 to 2000. By the time she graduated in 2000, she led the program's all-time three-pointers with 139.

== Career ==
=== Coaching and sports business ===
Valavanis became an assistant coach at Chico State under then-head coach Lynne Roberts in 2002. She worked to enhance the youth basketball camps held at the university. Coach Roberts praised her personality and ability to communicate and credited Valavanis for bringing her "out of her shell".

In her tenure as an assistant coach at Chico State, the team qualified for the NCAA tournament all four years, including a Final Four appearance.

After leaving Chico State University, Valavanis worked as a scout for the New York Liberty. She later joined the Golden State Warriors in a front office role. Later on, she served as the associate athletic director at University of California, Berkeley.

=== Seattle Storm ===
In 2014, Valavanis joined the Seattle Storm as the president and general manager and was at the helm of the team's rebuilding along with her management company Force10 Sports. Storm alumnus Sue Bird praised Valavanis' ability to connect with everyone in the organization and her personableness.

The team drafted Jewell Loyd as the first overall pick in the 2015 WNBA draft, which Loyd went on to win the Rookie of the Year Award that season. The Seattle Storm won their first WNBA Championship in 2018, and won their second in 2020 during the COVID-19 pandemic.

Valavanis championed a marquee jersey and community partnership with Swedish Medical Center in Seattle, Washington, and a television partnership with Q13 FOX. Later on, she also expanded the Carter Subaru partnership to include court naming rights, the first in WNBA history, resulting in the Carter Subaru Court at Climate Pledge Arena. Valavanis has also negotiated a deal with Symetra Insurance.

Outside of the team, Valavanis has prioritized advocacy for women's sports as a movement for social justice and gender equality. She serves as a member of the Washington Roundtable, the International Women's Forum, the Seattle Sports Commission Board of Directors, and the Seattle Metropolitan Chamber of Commerce Board of Trustees.

== Personal life ==
Valavanis' father died in January 2024. She resides in Seattle, Washington.

== Awards and honors ==
Year	Organization	Name	Notes
2016	Washington Diversity Council	Washington Leadership Excellence Award	
2016	Chico State University	Distinguished Alumni	
2017	Puget Sound Business Journal	Outstanding Voice	For her commitment to equality, diversity, and inclusion
2018	Puget Sound Business Journal	Women of Influence	
2019	Puget Sound Business Journal	Power 100 List	
2020	Puget Sound Business Journal	Power 100 List	
2021	Puget Sound Business Journal	Power 100 List	
2018	Seattle	Rising Brand Stars	
2019	Adweek	The 30 Most Powerful Women in Sports	
2019	Sports Business Journal	Game Changers	
