= USA Basketball Female Athlete of the Year =

American basketball award

The USA Basketball Female Athlete of the Year is an annual award issued by USA Basketball that honors the top American female basketball performer during the year's international competition.

Year	Winner	Status	Reference
1980	Carol Blazejowski	Post college	
1981	Denise Curry	UCLA senior	
1982	Cindy Noble	Post college	
1982	LaTaunya Pollard	Long Beach State junior	
1983	Lynette Woodard	Post college	
1984	Cheryl Miller	USC sophomore	
1985	Jennifer Gillom	Ole Miss junior	
1986	Cheryl Miller (2)	USC senior	
1987	Teresa Edwards	Post college	
1988	Katrina McClain	Post college	
1989	Venus Lacey	LaTech junior	
1990	Teresa Edwards (2)	Post college	
1991	Ruthie Bolton	Post college	
1992	Katrina McClain (2)	Post college	
1993	Lisa Leslie	USC junior	
1994	Dawn Staley	Post college	
1995	Sylvia Crawley	Post college	
1996	Teresa Edwards (3)	Post college	
1997	Chamique Holdsclaw	Tennessee sophomore	
1998	Lisa Leslie (2)	Post college	
1999	Natalie Williams	UCLA sophomore	
2000	Teresa Edwards (4)	Post college	
2001	Ayana Walker	Post college	
2002	Lisa Leslie (3)	Post college	
2003	Seimone Augustus	LSU freshman	
2004	Dawn Staley (2)	Post college	
2005	Crystal Langhorne	Maryland freshman	
2006	Diana Taurasi	Post college	
2007	Candice Wiggins	Stanford junior	
2008	Katie Smith	Post college	
2009	Tina Charles	UConn junior	
2010	Diana Taurasi (2)	Post college	
2011	Breanna Stewart	North Syracuse (HS) junior	
2012	Diana Taurasi (3)	Post college	
2013	Breanna Stewart (2)	UConn freshman	
2014	Maya Moore	Post college	
2015	A'ja Wilson	South Carolina freshman	
2016	Diana Taurasi (4)	Post college	
2017	Janelle Bailey	Providence Day School (HS) senior	
2018	Breanna Stewart (3)	Post college	
2019	Paige Bueckers	Hopkins (HS) senior	
2020	No award due to COVID-19 pandemic		
2021	Sue Bird	Post college	
2022	A'ja Wilson (2)	Post college	
2023	Hannah Hidalgo	Paul VI (HS) senior	
2024	A'ja Wilson (3)	Post college	
2025	Mikayla Blakes	Vanderbilt sophomore	

Status	Count
Post college	25
College senior	2
College junior	7
College sophomore	2
College freshman	4
High school senior	3
High school junior	1
	43

== See also ==
- USA Basketball Male Athlete of the Year
