= Portland Power (basketball) =

American basketball team

- League: American Basketball League
- Founded: 1996
- Folded: 1998
- Arena: Memorial Coliseum
- Capacity: 10,934
- Location: Portland, Oregon
- Team colors: green, blue, white
- Team manager: Linda Weston (general manager)
- Head coach: Greg Bruce (1996); Lin Dunn (1997–98); Missy Bequette (assistant coach)
- Division titles: 1 (1997–98)
- Website: www.portlandpower.com (archived on July 4, 1998)

The Portland Power was a women's professional basketball team in the American Basketball League (ABL) based in Portland, Oregon. The Power began play in 1996, and disbanded when the ABL folded at the end of 1998. The Power hosted home games at Veterans Memorial Coliseum, which had a capacity of 10,934.

== 1996–97 season ==
The Power held their pre-season training camp at Western Oregon University in Monmouth, Oregon. A scrimmage was held in Monmouth on October 6, 1996, against the Seattle Reign. Portland's first head coach was Greg Bruce, who had previously been the head women's basketball coach at Portland State. The Power's first roster included:

- Lisa Harrison, forward for Tennessee's 1991 national championship team
- Michelle M. Marciniak, guard for Tennessee's 1996 national championship team
- Katy Steding, Portland native, 1996 basketball Olympic gold medalist, and forward for Stanford's 1990 national championship team
- Coquese Washington, guard for Notre Dame
- Natalie Williams, center for UCLA's basketball team and volleyball national championship teams in 1990 and 1991

The Power got off to a poor start, going 5–17 under Bruce. Power players reported to ABL management on at least two occasions that Bruce was difficult to work with. The league met with Bruce, who resigned on January 1, 1997, citing personal reasons. He was replaced by former Purdue coach Lin Dunn. Under Dunn, the Power managed to go 9–9 the rest of the first season, and finished last in the Western Conference. Regional cable television network Prime Sports Northwest broadcast four Power games.

== 1997–98 season ==
In their second season, the Power showed much improvement. The team acquired Sylvia Crawley from North Carolina's 1994 national championship team and Delisha Milton from Florida among other players, and won the Western Conference. Coach Dunn was named ABL Coach of the Year, and Williams was named the league's MVP. In the playoffs, the team met the conference runner-up, the Long Beach Stingrays, and lost 2 games to 0.

Season ticket costs ranged from $176 to $265 ($353 to $531 adjusted for inflation). Individual game tickets cost $11, $13 or $15, depending on the section ($22, $26, $30, respectively, adjusted for inflation).

== 1998–99 season ==
For their third season, the Power acquired Steding's former Stanford teammate, point guard Sonja Henning. Though they got off to a slow start, the Power was leading the Western Conference after completing a five-game win streak when the ABL abruptly folded due to financial difficulties on December 22, 1998.

At the time of their demise, the Power's starting lineup was:

- Katy Steding, forward
- Delisha Milton, forward
- Natalie Williams, center
- Elaine Powell, guard
- Sonja Henning, guard

After the franchise folded, many Power players went on to continue their careers in the WNBA.

== Team records ==
Season	W	L	Win %	Result
1996–97	14	26	.350	4th Place, Western Conference
1997–98	27	17	.614	Western Conference Champion
1998	9	4	.692	1st Place, Western Conference

== 1997–98 playoff results ==
Date	Result
February 27, 1998	at Long Beach 72, Portland 62
March 1, 1998	Long Beach 70, at Portland 69
Long Beach wins series, 2–0

== ABL statistical leaders ==
1997–98 season:

- Natalie Williams, 1st in ABL in scoring (913 points, 21.7 points per game)
- Natalie Williams, 2nd in ABL in rebounding (477 rebounds, 11.4 rebounds per game)
- Natalie Williams, 1st in ABL in field goal percentage (336 of 604, .556 average)
- Natalie Williams, 4th in ABL in blocks (47 blocks, 1.1 blocks per game)

1998 season (partial):

- Natalie Williams, 2nd in ABL in scoring (258 points, 19.9 points per game)
- Natalie Williams, 2nd in ABL in field goals percentage (94 of 162 .580 average)
- Katy Steding, 1st in ABL in three-point goals (32 of 74 .432 average)
- Natalie Williams, 2nd in ABL in rebounding (129 rebounds, 9.9 rebounds per game)
- Sonja Henning, 2nd in ABL in assists (78 assists, 6.0 per game)

== Rosters ==
1996–97	1997–98	1998–99
Markita Aldridge; Stacey Ford; Sheila Frost; Lisa Harrison; Tanja Kostic; Michelle M. Marciniak; Tonya Sampson; Katy Steding; Coquese Washington; Natalie Williams; Falisha Wright	Sylvia Crawley; Sheila Frost; Molly Goodenbour; Lisa Harrison; Jennifer Jacoby; Delisha Milton; Laticia Morris; Elaine Powell; Charmin Smith; Katy Steding; Falisha Wright; Natalie Williams	Sylvia Crawley; Sonja Henning; Danielle McCulley; Delisha Milton; Elaine Powell; Shelley Sheetz; Rhonda Smith; Katy Steding; Debra Williams; Natalie Williams

== All-Star players ==
- Natalie Williams (First Team All-ABL, 1996–97 and 1997–98)

== League honors ==
- Natalie Williams, 1997–98 ABL Most Valuable Player
- Lin Dunn, 1997–98 ABL Coach of the Year
