= Atlanta Glory =

- Founded: 1996
- League: American Basketball League
- Team history: 1996–1998 (two seasons)
- Based in: Atlanta, Georgia
- Arena: Forbes Arena
- Head coach: Teresa Edwards (player/coach)
- Championships: None

The Atlanta Glory was a women's professional basketball team in Atlanta, Georgia. It was a member of the American Basketball League. The Glory played its home games in Forbes Arena.

The team folded before the start of the abortive third ABL season in 1998.

Notable players for the Glory included their star and head coach, Teresa Edwards, as well as Saudia Roundtree and Katrina McClain Johnson.

The Atlanta Glory, owned by Dwight Martin, was also a proposed 2012 expansion team of the Women's American Basketball Association.
