= Public–public partnership =

A public–public partnership (PuP) is a partnership between a government body or public authority and another such body or a non-profit organization to provide services and/or facilities, sometimes with the goal of transferring technical skills and expertise within international development projects. Partners can include other local, regional, state, provincial, first nations or aboriginal governments, national or federal governments, school boards, parks boards, non-governmental organizations, unions, pension funds, professional organizations, and governments, labour, non-governmental organizations and community groups in developing countries.

Public–public partnerships exist in contrast to public–private partnerships (P3s or PPPs). PPPs involve governments contracting corporations to design, build, finance, maintain and operate public projects like schools, hospitals and bridges. They usually involve large global corporations with contracts often lasting decades.

== PUPs in water ==
The Yokohama Waterworks Bureau first started training partnerships in the 1980s to help staff in other Asian countries. Far more countries have hosted PUPs than PPPs (44 countries with private participation).

Water PUPs have been around for over 20 years and are in all regions of the world. They have been growing in number more rapidly the last few years. They are used as an alternative tool for improvements in public water management.

== PUPs in research ==
In the European Union public–public partnerships are used to coordinate national research policies to create a pan-European research system, also called the European Research Area. Public–public partnerships are also shortened as P2Ps (public to public partnerships) in this context. These P2Ps are used for networking activities and the launch of transnational joint calls for research projects to align national strategies, helping to increase the efficiency and effectiveness of public research efforts. Since 2000, several kinds of P2Ps like Joint Programming Initiatives, the ERA-NET Scheme and Article 185 Initiatives have been developed. Since European research policy considered itself as 'Open to the World', several third-countries participate in these ERA-Nets and Joint Programming Initiatives. Today (2017) more than 100 countries participate in about 90 active European P2P research networks.

== See also ==
- Global public–private partnership
