= Shalonda Enis =

American basketball player (born 1974)

Personal information
- Born: December 3, 1974 (age 51)
- Listed height: 6 ft 1 in (1.85 m)
- Listed weight: 185 lb (84 kg)

Career information
- High school: Celeste (Celeste, Texas)
- College: Trinity Valley CC; Alabama
- WNBA draft: 1999: 2nd round, 13th overall pick
- Drafted by: Washington Mystics
- Position: Power forward / center
- Number: 3, 7

Career history
- 1999: Washington Mystics
- 2000–2003: Charlotte Sting

Career highlights
- 2× Third-team All-American – AP (1996, 1997); 2× First-team All-SEC (1996, 1997); All-American – USBWA (1996); Kodak Coaches' All-American (1996)
- Stats at WNBA.com
- Stats at Basketball Reference

Shalonda Enis (born December 3, 1974) is a former professional basketball player who played for the Washington Mystics and Charlotte Sting of the WNBA.

== Biography ==
Enis started playing basketball at age 12 at her middle school in Celeste, Texas. In her junior and senior years, she helped lead Celeste High School to consecutive state titles. At the conclusion of her senior year, she was the all-time leading scorer in Texas high school basketball history. She attended two colleges. First, she attended Trinity Valley Community College (TVCC) and helped lead the women's basketball team to the National Junior College Athletic Association championship in the 1993–94 season. She left TVCC as its all-time leader in career shots made (326) and season shots made (194). She later transferred to University of Alabama.

=== Alabama statistics ===
Legend
GP	Games played	GS	Games started	MPG	Minutes per game
FG%	Field goal percentage	3P%	3-point field goal percentage	FT%	Free throw percentage
RPG	Rebounds per game	APG	Assists per game	SPG	Steals per game
BPG	Blocks per game	PPG	Points per game	**Bold**	Career high

Year	Team	GP	Points	FG%	3P%	FT%	RPG	APG	SPG	BPG	PPG
1995-96	Alabama	**32**	**766**	**47.1%**	32.6%	68.4%	**9.5**	1.9	**2.1**	**1.1**	**23.9**
1996-97	Alabama	**32**	543	44.4%	**35.5%**	**69.7%**	8.9	**2.5**	1.5	0.7	17.0
Career		64	1309	45.9%	34.1%	69.0%	9.2	2.2	1.8	0.9	20.5

== WNBA ==
Enis played for the Washington Mystics and Charlotte Sting, a total of 106 games in five seasons. She re-signed with the Sting in 2005, but never played a regular season game.

=== WNBA career statistics ===
Legend
GP	Games played	GS	Games started	MPG	Minutes per game	RPG	Rebounds per game
APG	Assists per game	SPG	Steals per game	BPG	Blocks per game	PPG	Points per game
TO	Turnovers per game	FG%	Field-goal percentage	3P%	3-point field-goal percentage	FT%	Free-throw percentage
**Bold**	Career best	°	League leader

==== Regular season ====
Year	Team	GP	GS	MPG	FG%	3P%	FT%	RPG	APG	SPG	BPG	TO	PPG
1999	Washington	29	**26**	**29.1**	36.4	27.5	68.4	**5.4**	**1.6**	0.8	0.1	2.1	7.4
2000	Charlotte	12	9	26.9	39.4	34.4	76.7	3.8	0.8	0.8	0.1	1.3	**11.6**
2001	Charlotte	**32**	11	19.5	41.8	**45.2**	71.4	3.5	0.4	0.3	0.2	1.1	6.0
2002	Charlotte	4	0	14.8	27.8	0.0	**100.0**	2.3	0.8	0.3	**0.5**	**0.3**	4.8
2003	Charlotte	29	20	21.1	**43.6**	41.9	80.5	4.3	0.6	**1.0**	0.1	1.4	8.7
Career	5 years, 2 teams	106	66	23.2	39.8	36.9	75.6	4.2	0.8	0.7	0.1	1.5	7.7

==== Playoffs ====
Year	Team	GP	GS	MPG	FG%	3P%	FT%	RPG	APG	SPG	BPG	TO	PPG
2001	Charlotte	**8**	0	12.6	**50.0**	**75.0**	**75.0**	1.9	0.5	0.3	0.1	0.9	4.3
2002	Charlotte	1	0	3.0	0.0	0.0	0.0	2.0	0.0	0.0	0.0	**0.0**	0.0
2003	Charlotte	2	**2**	**29.0**	40.0	33.3	**100.0**	**6.0**	0.5	**1.0**	**1.0**	3.0	**7.5**
Career	3 years, 1 team	11	2	14.7	42.9	50.0	83.3	2.6	0.5	0.4	0.3	1.2	4.5

== Awards and honors ==
=== College ===
- Texas Eastern Conference Newcomer of the Year (1993)
- Texas Eastern Conference Most Valuable Player award (1994)
- Kodak All-American and Women's Basketball
- News Service All-American
- All-Conference First Team for her junior and senior years
- MVP of the 1994 Women's U.S. Olympic Festival
- Associated Press All-American Third Team

=== American Basketball League ===
- MVP of the 1998 All-Star Game
- Second-team All-ABL and Rookie of the Year by the national media.

== Personal life ==
Enis has three sons, Chanse, Chase, and Chayton.
