= Seattle Reign (basketball) =

First women's professional basketball franchise in Seattle, Washington

- Founded: 1996
- League: American Basketball League
- Team history: 1996–1998
- Based in: Seattle, Washington
- Arena: Seattle Center: Mercer Arena & KeyArena (on occasion)
- Colors: Maroon, Gold
- Head coach: Tammy Holder
- Manager: Karen Bryant
- Championships: 0
- Mascot: "Triumph", a Russian eagle

The Seattle Reign was the first women's professional basketball franchise in Seattle, Washington, USA. The Reign was a charter member of the American Basketball League (ABL). The team played from 1996 through 1998. The team's name was a reference to the city's reputation for rain and its location in King County, with an additional allusion to "The Reign Man" Shawn Kemp, then the city's biggest basketball star.

The Reign played most of its home games in the Mercer Arena, part of Seattle Center, but occasionally the team played at the larger KeyArena, home of the NBA's Seattle SuperSonics. The Arena was an old-fashioned, intimate setting for a basketball game, but its seating capacity of about 5,000 limited the team's upside attendance potential.

In the team's inaugural season, the Reign drafted 1996 Olympic team veteran Venus Lacy to play center, but Lacy was generally outshone by the team's other two "big women", Cindy Brown and Tari Phillips. (This was the case even before February 4, 1997, when Lacy was lost for the season due to a severe car injury.) The starting point guard for most games was Christy Hedgpeth, and Kate Paye was the shooting guard. Another player of note was Angela Aycock.

In the team's second season, with some fanfare, the team drafted Stanford small forward Kate Starbird, who had been a local prep star at Tacoma's Lakes High School. An even bigger impact player proved to be the University of Alabama's Shalonda Enis, who was named the ABL's Rookie of the Year for the 1997–98 season.

From 1997 on, the ABL faced serious competition from the deeper-pocketed WNBA. Fifteen games into the Reign's third season, on December 22, 1998 the ABL suddenly reached a financial crisis and folded its operations. The Reign was in the midst of its only winning season, having only weeks prior achieved their most memorable victory, a double-overtime win before an enthusiastic crowd of 7,400 at the KeyArena, over the San Jose Lasers, led by Jennifer Azzi.

Unlike most localities that had an ABL team, Seattle was quickly awarded a WNBA franchise two years later. The Seattle Storm debuted in 2000, and won their first WNBA Championship four years later in 2004, and have gone on to win three more WNBA titles.

== Team record ==
Season	W	L	Win %	Result
1996–97	17	23	.425	3rd Place, Western Conference
1997–98	15	29	.340	5th Place, Western Conference
1998	8	7	.533	3rd Place, Western Conference
All-time	40	59		

== All-Star players ==
Cindy Brown (All-ABL 2nd Team 1997)
Shalonda Enis (All-ABL 2nd Team 1998)
Tari Phillips (ABL All-Star game MVP, 1997–1998)

== League honors ==
Rookie of the Year Shalonda Enis (1998)
