= Columbus Quest =

American women's basketball franchise

- Founded: 1996
- Folded: 1998
- League: American Basketball League
- Team history: 1996–1998
- Based in: Columbus, Ohio
- Arena: Battelle Hall, in the Greater Columbus Convention Center
- Head coach: Brian Agler, Tonya Edwards
- Championships: Two ABL Championships, 1996–97 and 1997–98

The Columbus Quest was a professional women's basketball franchise located in Columbus, Ohio, in the now-defunct American Basketball League (ABL). They were one of the league's original eight teams that started play in 1996. In the league's brief history, the Quest was its most successful franchise, winning both championships the league awarded.

The Quest's head coach was Brian Agler, who finished with a record of 82–22 during the team's two-plus seasons of existence. After Agler left the Quest midseason to become the head coach of the WNBA's Minnesota Lynx, the team was coached by player-coach Tonya Edwards . Many of the Quest's players later played for the Lynx, including Edwards, Katie Smith, Andrea Lloyd-Curry, Angie Potthoff and Shanele Stires.

The Quest played their home games at the Greater Columbus Convention Center in Battelle Hall. Despite being the league's most successful team, they had the league's lowest average attendance for all three years of the ABL's existence.

== Season-by-season ==
=== 1996–97 ===
- Finished 31–9, won Eastern Conference by 10 games
- Defeated San Jose Lasers in Semifinals 2–0 (best of 3)
  - Game 1 at San Jose: Columbus 94, San Jose 69
  - Game 2 at Columbus: Columbus 81, San Jose 69
- Defeated Richmond Rage in Championship 3–2 (best of 5)
  - Game 1 at Columbus: Columbus 90, Richmond 89
  - Game 2 at Columbus: Richmond 75, Columbus 62
  - Game 3 at Richmond: Richmond 72, Columbus 67
  - Game 4 at Richmond: Columbus 95, Richmond 84
  - Game 5 at Columbus: Columbus 77, Richmond 64
- Nikki McCray named Most Valuable Player
- Brian Agler named Coach of the Year
- Valerie Still named Playoffs Most Valuable Player

=== 1997–98 ===
- Finished 36–8, won Eastern Conference by 12 games
- Defeated San Jose Lasers in Semifinals 2–0 (best of 3)
  - Game 1 at Columbus: Columbus 94, San Jose 88
  - Game 2 at San Jose: Columbus 74, San Jose 62
- Defeated Long Beach Stingrays in Championship 3–2 (best of 5)
  - Game 1 at Long Beach: Long Beach 65, Columbus 62
  - Game 2 at Long Beach: Long Beach 71, Columbus 61
  - Game 3 at Columbus: Columbus 70, Long Beach 61
  - Game 4 at Columbus: Columbus 68, Long Beach 53
  - Game 5 at Columbus: Columbus 86, Long Beach 81
- Valerie Still named Playoffs Most Valuable Player

=== 1998–99 ===
- Finished 11–3, leading Eastern Conference by 2 games
