= Long Beach Stingrays =

American basketball team

- Founded: 1997
- League: American Basketball League
- Team history: 1997–1998 (one season)
- Based in: Long Beach, California
- Arena: Walter Pyramid, California State University, Long Beach
- Head coach: Maura McHugh
- Championships: none

The Long Beach Stingrays was a women's professional basketball team. It existed for only the 1997–98 season, and was a member of the American Basketball League (ABL).

The Stingrays played most of their home games at the Walter Pyramid on the campus of California State University, Long Beach; however, one home game was played at the Arrowhead Pond of Anaheim (now the Honda Center). Their head coach was Maura McHugh.

The Stingrays' biggest star player was their center, Yolanda Griffith. Other notable Stingrays included Beverly Williams, Michelle M. Marciniak, and the former Olympic athlete Venus Lacy.

In what turned out to be the team's only season, the Stingrays made it all the way to the ABL's championship round. They beat the defending champion Columbus Quest in the first two games (both in Long Beach) but lost the final three games in Columbus, and with that, the series.

Despite their strong first season, the Stingrays were viewed largely with indifference by area fans. They had the league's worst attendance; for most of the season, they attracted crowds in the hundreds. Citing anemic season ticket sales and weak corporate sponsorship, league officials shuttered the Stingrays in August 1998. The rest of the league followed in December.

Griffith, like most of the ABL's star players, eventually joined the competing Women's National Basketball Association (WNBA) Griffith went on to a long career in the WNBA, most notably for the Sacramento Monarchs. As for McHugh, she has coached various professional and college teams.

== Team record ==
=== Regular season ===
Season	W	L	Win %	Result
1997–1998	26	18	.591	2^{nd} Place, Western Conference

=== Post-season ===
ABL Playoffs First-Round

Date	Winning team	Losing team	Score	Notes
21 February 1998	Long Beach Stingrays	Colorado Xplosion	96–72	
22 February 1998	Colorado	Long Beach	88–68	
25 February 1998	Long Beach	Colorado	92–61	Long Beach wins series, 2–1

ABL Semifinals

Date	Winning team	Losing team	Score	Notes
27 February 1998	Long Beach Stingrays	Portland Power	72–62	
1 March 1998	Long Beach	Portland	70–69	Long Beach wins series, 2–0

ABL Championship Series

Date	Winning team	Losing team	Score	Notes
8 March 1998	Long Beach Stingrays	Columbus Quest	65–62	
9 March 1998	Long Beach	Columbus	71–61	
11 March 1998	Columbus	Long Beach	70–61	
11 March 1998	Columbus	Long Beach	68–53	
15 March 1998	Columbus	Long Beach	86–81	Columbus wins ABL Championship, 3–2

== League honors ==
Yolanda Griffith

- ABL Defensive Player of the Year, 1997–98
- All-ABL First Team, 1997–98
