= Nashville Noise =

- Founded: 1998
- League: American Basketball League
- Team history: 1998–1998
- Based in: Nashville, Tennessee
- Arena: Nashville Municipal Auditorium (capacity 8,700)
- Colors: Orange and Blue
- Head coach: Candi Harvey
- Manager: Mike Kopp (General Manager)
- Championships: none
- Local media: Chip Ramsey (play-by-play announcer)

The Nashville Noise was a member of the American Basketball League (ABL). The site was a sound one, capitalizing on the long-time success and well established fan support of the University of Tennessee's women's basketball program, and the team was anchored by former Tennessee All-American Michelle M. Marciniak and the 1996 Olympic gold-medal winner and native Tennessean Venus Lacy. However, after playing only 15 games in 1998, the team was forced to disband when, on December 22, 1998, the ABL suddenly ceased operating.

The team was coached by former high school and college coach Candi Harvey.

== Team record ==
Season	W	L	Win %	Result
1998	4	11	.267	4th Place, Eastern Conference
