= New England Blizzard =

Women's professional basketball franchise based in Hartford, Connecticut

- Founded: 1996
- League: American Basketball League
- Team history: 1996–1998 (3 seasons)
- Based in: Hartford, Connecticut
- Arena: Hartford Civic Center (Capacity 15,418), Springfield Civic Center (Capacity 8,712)
- Colors: Sky blue and White
- Head coach: K. C. Jones (head coach), Belinda "Boe" Pearman (associate coach)
- Championships: none

The New England Blizzard was a women's professional basketball franchise based in Hartford, Connecticut. The Blizzard was a charter member of the American Basketball League (ABL). Playing from 1996 through 1998, the team produced many memorable moments for New England basketball fans and followers of women's sports in general.

The Blizzard played most of its home games in the Hartford Civic Center, but occasionally the team played at the smaller Springfield Civic Center. Though they never won a title, the Blizzard consistently drew the most fans of any ABL franchise. This was partly because of the strong winning tradition established at the University of Connecticut, which built a large, enthusiastic, and knowledgeable base of local fan support for the women's game. Additionally, the Blizzard hired Boston Celtics legend K. C. Jones as head coach in 1997. Jones was easily the most widely recognized of the ABL coaches. Finally, the team featured several former Huskies.

== Season 1 ==
With their first draft pick, the Blizzard selected former UConn Husky center and 1996 Olympic team veteran Rebecca Lobo, who never signed with the Blizzard. Their second pick was guard Teresa Weatherspoon who played her college ball at Louisiana Tech, and also never played for the Blizzard, choosing instead to play for the New York Liberty of the rival WNBA. But the Blizzard made up for that loss by picking up the former Auburn University standout Carolyn Jones (later Jones-Young), who became the Blizzard's most consistent scorer.

== Season 2 ==
In the team's second season, the team drafted another Husky center, Kara Wolters, and two other ex-Huskies. The team's winning percentage improved, and by finishing second in the Eastern Conference, the Blizzard made the playoffs for the first and last time, where they lost in the first round in two straight games to the San Jose Lasers.

== Season 3 ==
In its third season, thirteen proved to be an unlucky number for the Blizzard: 13 games into their season, on December 22, 1998 the ABL folded. Connecticut was luckier than most ABL venues—it eventually got a WNBA team, the Connecticut Sun, which got all the way to the WNBA finals before losing in 2004 and 2005.

== Team record ==
Season	W	L	Win %	Result
1996-97	16	24	.400	4th Place, Eastern Conference
1997-98	24	20	.545	2nd Place, Eastern Conference
1998	3	10	.231	5th Place, Eastern Conference

== All-Star players ==
Carolyn Jones (ABL 2nd Team 1996, ABL 1st Team 1997)
