= American Basketball League (1996–1998) =

Defunct professional women's basketball league in the United States

American Basketball League (ABL)
- Sport: Basketball
- Founded: 1995
- First season: 1996–97
- Folded: 1998
- Owners: Steve Hams, Anne Cribbs and Gary Cavalli
- CEO: Gary Cavalli
- COO: Steve Hams (1996-97); Jim Weyermann (1998)
- Director: Tracey Williams
- Motto: "Real Basketball"
- No. of teams: 9
- Country: United States
- Most titles: 2 (Columbus Quest)
- Broadcasters: SportsChannel, BET, Fox Sports Net
- Sponsor: Reebok

The American Basketball League, often abbreviated to the ABL of 1996 was a professional women's basketball league in the United States. At the same time the ABL was being formed, the National Basketball Association (NBA) was creating the Women's National Basketball Association (WNBA). The ABL began league competition in the Fall of 1996, while the WNBA launched its first game in June 1997. Both organizations came into existence during a surge in popularity for women's basketball in the United States that followed the perfect 35–0 national championship season for the Connecticut Huskies in 1995 and the undefeated, gold medal-winning performance of the United States Women's basketball team at the 1996 Summer Olympics.

The ABL lasted two full seasons: 1996–97 and 1997–98. The Atlanta Glory and Long Beach Stingrays folded prior to the start of the 1998–99 season, and were replaced by two expansion teams, the Chicago Condors and Nashville Noise. On December 22, 1998, with almost no warning, the ABL declared Chapter 11 bankruptcy and suspended operations. Each team had played between 12 and 15 games of the 1998–99 season.

The ABL got off the ground before the WNBA, and at least early on its quality of play was higher than the rival league. This was partly due to the league's signing of a majority of players from the 1996 USA women's national team. Although the WNBA was bankrolled by the NBA, the ABL offered higher salaries. The two leagues did not compete directly; the ABL played during the winter while the WNBA played during the summer. However, this arrangement put the ABL in competition with the established men's NBA for an audience. Ultimately, the ABL found the WNBA's stronger financial resources—augmented by the NBA's marketing machine—to be too much to overcome.

The league operated as a single-entity structure, which was intended to control costs until it found its feet. However, it also meant that even the most basic decisions related to team operations had to go through the league office in Palo Alto, California. The ABL was also under-financed.

Of all the ABL cities, Atlanta, Chicago, Portland and Seattle now have WNBA teams.

== Seasons ==
=== 1996–97 ===
Eastern Conference	W	L	PCT
Columbus Quest	31	9	.775
Richmond Rage	21	19	.525
Atlanta Glory	18	22	.450
New England Blizzard	16	24	.400

Western Conference	W	L	PCT
Colorado Xplosion	25	15	.625
San Jose Lasers	18	22	.450
Seattle Reign	17	23	.425
Portland Power	14	26	.350

The 1996–97 ABL All-Star Game was played on December 15, 1996, at the Hartford Civic Center. The Western Conference defeated the Eastern Conference, 81–65, and the game's MVP was Tari Phillips.

Semifinals
E1	Columbus	2
W2	San Jose	0
E2	Richmond	2
W1	Colorado	0

Finals
E1	Columbus	3
E2	Richmond	2

=== 1997–98 ===
Eastern Conference	W	L	PCT
Columbus Quest	36	8	.818
New England Blizzard	24	20	.545
Atlanta Glory	15	29	.341
Philadelphia Rage	13	31	.295

Western Conference	W	L	PCT
Portland Power	27	17	.614
Long Beach Stingrays	26	18	.591
Colorado Xplosion	21	23	.477
San Jose Lasers	21	23	.477
Seattle Reign	15	29	.341

The 1997–98 ABL All-Star Game was played on January 18, 1998, at Disney's Wide World of Sports Complex in Lake Buena Vista, Florida. The Eastern Conference defeated the Western Conference, 102–73.

First Round
E2	New England	0
W4	San Jose	2
W2	Long Beach	2
W3	Colorado	1

Semifinals
E1	Columbus	2
W4	San Jose	0
W1	Portland	0
W2	Long Beach	2

Finals
E1	Columbus	3
W2	Long Beach	2

=== 1998–99 ===
Eastern Conference	W	L	PCT
Columbus Quest	11	3	.786
Philadelphia Rage	9	5	.643
Chicago Condors	4	8	.333
Nashville Noise	4	11	.267
New England Blizzard	3	10	.231

Western Conference	W	L	PCT
Portland Power	9	4	.692
San Jose Lasers	9	6	.600
Seattle Reign	8	7	.533
Colorado Xplosion	5	8	.387

The 1998–99 ABL All-Star Game was scheduled to be played on January 24, 1999, in San Jose, California, but was canceled when the league ceased operations in December 1998.

== Notable players ==
- Jennifer Azzi
- Debbie Black
- Cindy Brown
- Edna Campbell
- Sylvia Crawley
- Teresa Edwards
- Tonya Edwards
- Shalonda Enis
- Jackie Joyner-Kersee, the Olympic-champion long jumper and heptathlete
- Molly Goodenbour
- Yolanda Griffith
- Sonja Henning
- Kedra Holland-Corn
- Shannon Johnson
- Carolyn Jones-Young
- Venus Lacy
- Andrea Lloyd-Curry
- Stacey Lovelace
- Michelle M. Marciniak
- Nikki McCray
- Carla McGhee
- Chasity Melvin
- Delisha Milton
- Taj McWilliams-Franklin
- Kate Paye, now head coach at Stanford University
- Tari Phillips
- Elaine Powell
- Katrina Price
- Jennifer Rizzotti, now the President of the Connecticut Sun
- Crystal Robinson
- Saudia Roundtree
- Sheri Sam
- Katie Smith, now an assistant coach for the Minnesota Lynx
- Charlotte Smith, now the head coach at Elon University
- Dawn Staley, now the head coach at the University of South Carolina
- Katy Steding
- Kate Starbird
- Sonja Tate
- Val Whiting
- Natalie Williams, now the general manager of the Las Vegas Aces
- Kara Wolters

== See also ==
- National Women's Basketball League
- Women's American Basketball Association
- Women's National Basketball Association
- Women's Professional Basketball League
- American Basketball League (1996–1998) on television
