= Philadelphia Rage =

Richmond Rage / Philadelphia Rage
- League: American Basketball League
- Founded: 1996
- History: 1996–1998 (Folded during third season)
- Arena: Richmond Coliseum and Robins Center, Richmond, VA (1996–97); The Palestra, Philadelphia, PA (1997–98)
- Team colors: Gold, White, Blue and Red.
Home	Away

The Philadelphia Rage was one of the eight original franchises of the American Basketball League (ABL), a women's professional basketball league. The franchise existed for just two-and-a-half seasons, from 1996 to 1997 in Richmond, Virginia, and from 1997 to late 1998 in Philadelphia.

== History ==
The Rage was led by 1996 U.S. Olympic team point guard Dawn Staley and Adrienne Goodson, who shot like a guard and rebounded like a power forward. With power forward Taj McWilliams, the Rage had three players out of the ten named to the 1997 All-ABL First and Second teams—the most of any team.

The Rage made sports news headlines by signing heptathlete and long jumper Jackie Joyner-Kersee. The team's initial draft choice was Lisa Leslie, who opted to sign with the WNBA instead.

== Richmond Rage Team Record ==
Even without Leslie, the Rage had a strong first season. Although its win–loss record was 21-19, a full ten games behind the 31-9 Columbus Quest, its record was good enough for second place in the Eastern Conference, and that was good enough to put the Rage in the four-team playoffs. Matched in a best-of-three set against the top team in the Western Conference, the Colorado Xplosion, the Rage won two straight to advance to the finals against Columbus. In the best-of-five finals, the Rage jumped out to a 2–0 series lead, only to lose the last three games.

Season	W	L	Win %	Result
1996-97	21	19	.525	2nd Place, Eastern Conference

== Philadelphia Rage Team Record ==
Despite fielding essentially the same team that went all the way to the finals, the relocated Philadelphia Rage did not do nearly as well in its second season, going just 13-31 and finishing fifth (dead last) in the East.

Season	W	L	Win %	Result
1997-98	13	31	.340	5th Place, Eastern Conference
1998	9	5	.643	2nd Place, Eastern Conference

== Last Season ==
Under new coach Anne Donovan, the Rage was off to a 9–5 start when the league suddenly folded on December 22, 1998. Less than a month later, on January 18, 1999, Rage reserve guard Katrina Price died of a self-inflicted gunshot.

== All-ABL Rage Players ==
- Dawn Staley (All-ABL 1st Team 1996–1997)
- Adrienne Goodson (All-ABL 1st Team 1996–1997)
- Taj McWilliams (All-ABL 2nd Team 1996–1997)
- Dawn Staley (All-ABL 2nd Team 1997–1998)
- Adrienne Goodson (All-ABL 2nd Team 1997–1998)
