= San Jose Lasers =

Women's professional basketball team

- Founded: 1996
- League: American Basketball League
- Team history: 1996–1998 (Two full seasons and part of a third)
- Based in: San Jose, California
- Colors: Black, Green, and White
- Championships: none

The San Jose Lasers were a women's professional basketball team in San Jose, California. It was a member of the American Basketball League. Their home games were primarily held at the San Jose State Event Center with an occasional game being played at the San Jose Arena. The head coach of the Lasers for their first season was Jan Lowrey, who was fired after an 18–22 season. For the second and partial 3rd season, the head coach was Angela Beck, who gave up her position as the University of Nebraska women's basketball coach, to head the Lasers.

The team folded along with the rest of the league during the third ABL season in 1998.
