= 2000 in basketball =

The following are the basketball events of the year 2000 throughout the world.

== Championships ==
=== 2000 Olympics ===
- Men:
  (gold) United States
  (silver) France
  (bronze) Lithuania
- Women:
  (gold) United States
  (silver) Australia
  (bronze) Brazil

=== Professional ===
- Men
  - 2000 NBA Finals: Los Angeles Lakers over the Indiana Pacers 4–2. MVP: Shaquille O'Neal
    - 1999–2000 NBA season, 2000 NBA Playoffs, 2000 NBA draft, 2000 NBA All-Star Game
- Women
  - WNBA Finals: Houston Comets over the New York Liberty 2–0. MVP: Cynthia Cooper
    - 2000 WNBA season, 2000 WNBA Playoffs, 2000 WNBA draft, 2000 WNBA All-Star Game

=== College ===
- Men
  - NCAA Division I: Michigan State University 89, University of Florida 76
  - National Invitation Tournament: Wake Forest University 71, University of Notre Dame 61
  - NCAA Division II: Metropolitan State College of Denver 97, Kentucky Wesleyan College 79
  - NCAA Division III: Catholic 76, William Paterson College 62
  - NAIA Division I: Life University (Ga.) 61, Georgetown College (Ky.) 59
  - NAIA Division II: Embry–Riddle Aeronautical University (Florida) 75, University of the Ozarks (Mo.) 63
  - NJCAA Division I: Southeastern C.C., W. Burlington, Iowa 84, Calhoun C.C., Decatur, Alabama 70
- Women
  - NCAA Division I: University of Connecticut 71, University of Tennessee 52
  - NCAA Division II: Northern Kentucky 71, North Dakota State University 62 (OT)
  - NCAA Division III Washington (Mo.) 77, University of Southern Maine 33
  - NAIA Division I: Oklahoma City University 64, Simon Fraser (BC) 55
  - NAIA Division II University of Mary (N.D.) 59, Northwestern (Iowa) 49

== Awards and honors ==
=== Professional ===
- Men
  - NBA Most Valuable Player Award: Shaquille O'Neal
  - NBA Rookie of the Year Award: (tie) Elton Brand & Steve Francis
  - NBA Defensive Player of the Year Award: Alonzo Mourning
  - NBA Coach of the Year Award: Doc Rivers, Orlando Magic
  - Euroscar Award: Gregor Fučka, Fortitudo Bologna and Italy
  - Mr. Europa: Gregor Fučka, Fortitudo Bologna and Italy
- Women
  - WNBA Most Valuable Player Award: Sheryl Swoopes, Houston Comets
  - WNBA Defensive Player of the Year Award: Sheryl Swoopes, Houston Comets
  - WNBA Rookie of the Year Award: Betty Lennox, Minnesota Lynx
  - WNBA Most Improved Player Award: Tari Phillips, New York Liberty
  - Kim Perrot Sportsmanship Award: Suzie McConnell Serio, Cleveland Rockers
  - WNBA Coach of the Year Award: Michael Cooper, Los Angeles Sparks
  - WNBA All-Star Game MVP: Tina Thompson, Houston Comets
  - WNBA Finals Most Valuable Player Award: Cynthia Cooper, Houston Comets

=== Collegiate ===
- Combined
  - Legends of Coaching Award: Mike Krzyzewski, Duke
- Men
  - John R. Wooden Award: Kenyon Martin, Cincinnati
  - Naismith College Coach of the Year: Mike Montgomery, Stanford
  - Frances Pomeroy Naismith Award: Scoonie Penn, Ohio State
  - Associated Press College Basketball Player of the Year: Kenyon Martin, Cincinnati
  - NCAA basketball tournament Most Outstanding Player: Shane Battier, Duke
  - USBWA National Freshman of the Year: Jason Gardner, Arizona
  - Associated Press College Basketball Coach of the Year: Larry Eustachy, Iowa State
  - Naismith Outstanding Contribution to Basketball: Bill Wall
- Women
  - Naismith College Player of the Year: Tamika Catchings, Tennessee
  - Naismith College Coach of the Year: Geno Auriemma, Connecticut
  - Wade Trophy: Edwina Brown, Texas
  - Frances Pomeroy Naismith Award: Helen Darling, Penn State
  - Associated Press Women's College Basketball Player of the Year: Tamika Catchings, Tennessee
  - NCAA basketball tournament Most Outstanding Player: Shea Ralph, UConn
  - Carol Eckman Award: Kathy Delaney-Smith, Harvard University
  - Associated Press College Basketball Coach of the Year: Geno Auriemma, Connecticut
  - Nancy Lieberman Award: Sue Bird, Connecticut
  - Naismith Outstanding Contribution to Basketball: Harley Redin

=== Naismith Memorial Basketball Hall of Fame ===
- Class of 2000:
  - Daniel "Danny" Biasone
  - Robert A. McAdoo
  - Charles Martin Newton
  - Pat Head Summitt
  - Isiah L. Thomas
  - Morgan B. Wootten

=== Women's Basketball Hall of Fame ===
- Class of 2000

- Alline Banks Sprouse
- Mildred Barnes
- Barbara "Breezy" Bishop
- E. Wayne Cooley
- Nancy Dunkle
- Olga Sukharnova
- Borislav Stankovic
- Fran Garmon

- Dorothy Gaters
- Sue Gunter
- Rita Horky
- Betty Jaynes
- George E. Killian
- Kim Mulkey-Robertson
- Cindy Noble Hauserman
- Lorene Ramsey
- Patricia (Trish) Roberts
- Sue Rojcewicz
- Cathy Rush
- Juliene Brazinski Simpson
- Katherine Washington
- Dean Weese
- Marcy Weston
- Kay Yow

== Events ==
- The Gary Steelheads joins the CBA
- January: Mark Cuban becomes owner of the Dallas Mavericks
- November 17: For the Phoenix Suns against the New York Knicks, Jason Kidd is debited with an NBA-record 14 turnovers in one game

== Movies ==
- Finding Forrester
- Love & Basketball
- Whatever Happened to Micheal Ray?

== Deaths ==
- January 4 — Al Schrecker, American NBL player (Pittsburgh Raiders) (born 1917)
- January 12 — Bobby Phills, Cleveland Cavaliers and Charlotte Hornets guard (born 1969)
- January 16 — Örlygur Aron Sturluson, Icelandic basketball player (Njarðvík) (born 1981)
- February 21 — Antonio Díaz-Miguel, Hall of Fame Spanish coach (born 1933)
- February 24 — Bernard Opper, All-American college player (Kentucky), NBL and original ABL player (born 1915)
- March 7 — Darrell Floyd, American college basketball player and national scoring champion (Furman)
- March 8 — Joe Mullaney, American college coach (Providence College) (born 1925)
- March 12 — Aleksandar Nikolić, Hall of Fame Serbian coach (born 1924)
- April 6 — Stan Watts, Hall of Fame college coach at Brigham Young University (born 1911)
- April 9 — Jack Gardner, Hall of Fame college coach at Kansas State and Utah (born 1910)
- May 5 — Bill Musselman, ABA, NBA and college coach. The first head coach of the Minnesota Timberwolves franchise (born 1940)
- May 9 — John Nucatola, Hall of Fame college and professional referee (born 1907)
- May 20 — Malik Sealy, Minnesota Timberwolves guard (born 1970)
- June 9 — John "Brooms" Abramovic, First college player to score 2000+ points and early professional (born 1919)
- June 16 — Mike Silliman, American NBA player (Buffalo Braves) and Olympic gold medalist (1968) (born 1944)
- June 28 — Haskell Cohen, former NBA public relations director and creator of Parade High School All-America teams (born 1914)
- July 7 — Denny Price, 62, American AAU player (Phillips 66ers) and college coach (Sam Houston State, Phillips).
- July 10 — Conrad McRae, Syracuse forward who played in Europe (born 1971)
- August 25 — Leo Barnhorst, Two-time NBA All-Star with the Indianapolis Olympians (born 1924)
- September 13 — Duane Swanson, American Olympic gold medalist (1936) (born 1913)
- October 6 — John Keller, American Olympic gold medalist (1952) (born 1928)
- October 7 — Ed Beisser, American college All-American (Creighton) and AAU (Phillips 66ers) player (born 1919)
- December 15 — Haris Brkić, Serbian player (Partizan) (born 1974)
- December 31 — Wayne Glasgow, American Olympic gold medalist (1952) (born 1926)
