= 1976 United States women's Olympic basketball team =

- Head coach: Billie Moore

The 1976 United States women's Olympic basketball team competed in the Games of the XXI Olympiad in Montreal, Canada, representing the United States of America. It was the first time the United States had fielded a women's basketball team in the Olympics.

The team was led by Cal State Fullerton's women's basketball coach Billie Moore and had four future Hall of Famers on the roster: Ann Meyers, Nancy Lieberman, Lusia Harris, and Pat Summitt (then called Pat Head).

Despite finishing second place behind the Soviet Union, the team is considered one of the most important in basketball history, paving the way for women's basketball to flourish in the United States. As a unit, the team was elected to the Naismith Basketball Hall of Fame in 2023.

== Roster ==
United States women's national basketball team – 1976 Summer Olympics roster
Players
Coaches

Pos.	No.	Name	Age – Date of birth	Height	Club	Ctr.
F		Cindy Brogdon	19 – February 25, 1957	1.78 m (5 ft 10 in)	Mercer	(United States)
F		Nancy Dunkle	21 – January 10, 1955	1.88 m (6 ft 2 in)	Cal State Fullerton	(United States)
C		Lusia Harris	21 – February 10, 1955	1.91 m (6 ft 3 in)	Delta State	(United States)
G		Pat Head	24 – June 14, 1952	1.80 m (5 ft 11 in)	Tennessee–Martin	(United States)
C		Charlotte Lewis	20 – September 10, 1955	1.88 m (6 ft 2 in)	Illinois State	(United States)
G		Nancy Lieberman	18 – July 1, 1958	1.78 m (5 ft 10 in)	Old Dominion	(United States)
F		Gail Marquis	21 – November 18, 1954	1.83 m (6 ft 0 in)	Queens	(United States)
G		Ann Meyers	21 – March 26, 1955	1.75 m (5 ft 9 in)	UCLA	(United States)
F		Mary Anne O'Connor	22 – October 1, 1953	1.78 m (5 ft 10 in)	Southern Connecticut	(United States)
F		Patricia Roberts	21 – June 14, 1955	1.85 m (6 ft 1 in)	Tennessee	(United States)
G		Susan Rojcewicz	23 – May 29, 1953	1.65 m (5 ft 5 in)	Southern Connecticut	(United States)
G		Juliene Simpson	23 – January 20, 1953	1.70 m (5 ft 7 in)	JFK	(United States)

Head coach

(United States) Billie Moore

Assistant coach(es)

(United States) Sue Gunter

Legend

- Club – describes last
  club before the tournament
- Age – describes age
  on July 18, 1976

== Results ==
The first women's Olympic basketball tournament consisted of a single round-robin group, where the group rankings determined the final standings. The Soviet team went undefeated and won the gold medal. The U.S. team won the silver medal through a victory over the Bulgarian team, which served as the tiebreaker between the two teams in favor of the U.S. team.

July 19

United States	71–84	Japan

Centre Étienne Desmarteau, Montreal

July 20

United States	95–79	Bulgaria

Centre Étienne Desmarteau, Montreal

July 22

United States	89–75	Canada

Centre Étienne Desmarteau, Montreal

July 23

United States	77–112	Soviet Union

Centre Étienne Desmarteau, Montreal

July 26

United States	83–67	Czechoslovakia

Montreal Forum, Montreal

== Legacy ==
In 2023, the 1976 US Olympic women's basketball team was elected as a unit to the Naismith Memorial Basketball Hall of Fame. The election made it only the ninth team to be so honored.

== See also ==
- 1976 Summer Olympics
- Basketball at the 1976 Summer Olympics
- United States at the 1976 Summer Olympics
- United States women's national basketball team
