= Kelly Hall =

Kelly Hall may refer to:

- J. Kelly Hall (1959–2010), women's basketball coach
- Kelly Hall (University of Chicago)

== See also ==
- Arthell Kelly Hall, University of Southern Mississippi
