= Anne Paradise Hansford =

American basketball player (1924–2021)

Personal information
- Born: August 18, 1924 Lincoln County, Georgia, U.S.
- Died: July 10, 2021 (aged 96)

Career information
- High school: Meson Academy, Lexington, Georgia
- College: Nashville Business College, University of Georgia

Career history
- The Atlanta Sports Arena Blues

Anne "The Panther" Paradise Hansford (August 18, 1924 – July 10, 2021) was a competitive basketball player and the first female from Georgia to win three All-American honors (1947, 1948 and 1949). She became well known while playing for The Atlanta Sports Arena Blues in the Amateur Athletic Union from 1946 to 1948.

== Early life ==
Anne Paradise Hansford was born in a farmer's family in Lexington, Georgia on August 18, 1924. She was always an active girl as she helped out on the family's farm from a young age.

Paradise was a fast and tall athlete, playing as a dominant forward with excellent rebounding ability. She was part of a high school basketball team in Lexington that was undefeated for four seasons, and won four consecutive state championships. During high school, she also competed in track and field. Her main track discipline was high jump and she would practice by jumping over fences at her family farm.

== Career ==
During her short attendance at the University of Georgia, Paradise wasn't allowed to play for the intramural girls' team because she was too good, so she coached the team instead. She also played field hockey. Since the university didn't have an intercollegiate basketball team, she left and joined the first Atlanta team that made the AAU tournament in 1943. After that, she had a short episode with NBC and went to a tournament in Mexico City, where she met Hazel Walker.

Her most successful years came while playing for The Atlanta Blues from 1946 to 1948. During this time, she became the first Georgia woman to become an All-American and was nominated 2 times. In 1947, she led the team to an undefeated 40–0 season and the National Women's AAU basketball championship. During this time, she played with Alline Banks Sprouse, who was widely regarded as the best female basketball player of the 1940s. The last game that Paradise and Banks played together was against the Nashville Goldblumes to eventually win the National Women's Basketball AAU championship.

Her nickname "The Panther" was given by an Atlanta-based sports-journalist, Joe Livingston, who thought all her efforts on the court made her look like a panther. In 1948, Georgia based track and field coach Forrest "Spec" Towns wanted Hansford to be a part of the US Olympic Track and Field Team. However, she declined because her only interest was in playing basketball.

After leaving the Atlanta Blues, Hansford joined the Chatham Blanketeers in 1949. She played one final season in the AAU before deciding to quit basketball; while with the Blanketeers, she earned her third All-American honor. In her final season, she led the Blanketeers to a fourth-place finish in the national tournament.

On February 8, 2003, Hansford's name was entered into the Georgia Sports Hall of Fame in Macon.

== Personal life ==
During her basketball career, she was offered a $5000 contract to become a wrestler and an opportunity to model bikinis in California, but she rejected both. When talking about her offer to model bikinis in California, she said "I was highly insulted". After finishing her basketball career in 1949, Paradise went home and married her next door neighbor, John Hansford, with whom she had three children: Marion, Ted and Tim.

== Works cited ==
- "Anne Paradise Hansford" (PDF). Georgia Sports Hall of Fame. 2003.
- Bonds Staples, Gracie (2006). "Athletes' Winning Way Span the Decades". Atlanta: The Atlanta Constitution.
- Ikard, Robert W. (2005). Just for Fun: the Story of AAU Women's Basketball. University of Arkansas Press. ISBN 978-1-61075-222-0.
- Rosen, Karen (2003). "Paradise at Last". Atlanta: The Atlanta Constitution.
