= Women's Basketball Hall of Fame =

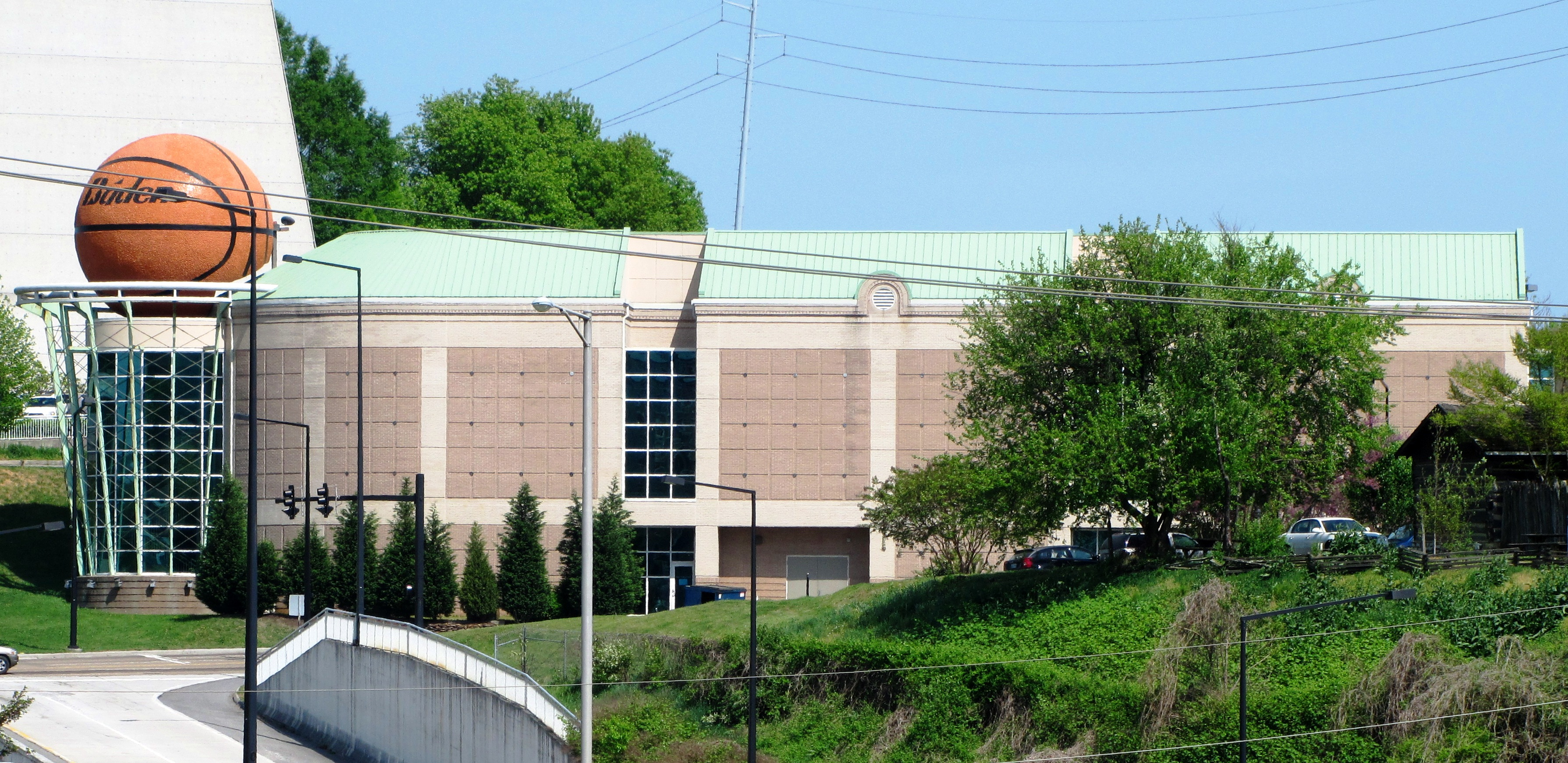
- The Women's Basketball Hall of Fame in Knoxville, Tennessee, USA

- Location of the Women's Basketball Hall of Fame
- Established: 1999
- Location: 700 Hall of Fame Drive, Knoxville, Tennessee, 37915
- Coordinates: 35°57′47″N 83°54′39″W
- Type: Sport hall of fame
- CEO: Michelle Marciniak (effective July 1)
- Website: www.wbhof.com

The Women's Basketball Hall of Fame honors those who have contributed to the sport of women's basketball. The Hall of Fame opened in 1999 in Knoxville, Tennessee, USA. It is the only facility of its kind dedicated to all levels of women's basketball. Knoxville is known for having a large women's basketball following as well as being the home of the University of Tennessee's Lady Vols basketball team previously coached by women's coach Pat Summitt, who was part of the first class inducted. With the 2026 Induction, the Women's Basketball Hall of Fame added eight new members to its hall, honoring 215 inductees.

Inductees may be nominated in the following categories: Coach, Player, International Player, Veteran Player, Contributor, and Official.

== Highlights ==
=== Women's Basketball Hall of Fame campus ===
The Women's Basketball Hall of Fame is home to the world's largest basketball sitting on the north rotunda of the hall, measuring 30 feet tall and weighing 10 tons.

The WBHOF Basketball Courts in the north rotunda of the hall allow one to test one's basketball skills on three different courts representing the hall's mission statement of "honoring the past, celebrating the present, and promoting the future" of women's basketball. The courts also are home to a timed dribbling course and a passing skills area. There is also a photo area where you can pretend to be players from different eras in history.

==== Pat Summitt ====
Pat Summitt Rotunda is located at the entrance of the WBHOF. This area remembers founding board member and Class of 1999 inductee Pat Summitt.

The courtyard outside of the Pat Summitt Rotunda is shaped like a basketball and is made of numerous bricks with personalized inscriptions. Many of the bricks are engraved to honor guests, inductees and a host of other who have chosen to leave their legacy at the hall of fame.

==== Hall of Honor ====
The Hall of Honor is the location within the Hall of Fame that recognizes the achievements of each of the inductees.

==== Eastman Statue ====
The Eastman Statue, sculpted by Elizabeth MacQueen, is erected at the entrance to the Women's Basketball Hall of Fame. This 17-foot-tall bronze statue exemplifies Women's Basketball Hall of Fame's mission to "honor the past, celebrate the present and promote the future" of women's basketball. Each year, the Women's Basketball Hall of Fame presents its current class of Inductees with a replica of the Eastman statue, which is now known as the "Berenson" named after Senda Berenson.

=== Trailblazers of the Game ===
==== All American Red Heads ====
The All American Red Heads played for 50 years, from 1936 to 1986 which is still the longest running women's professional team. The Red Heads were founded by Mr. and Mrs. C. M. Olson in Cassville, Missouri. C. M. Olson was the former coach-owner of a male exhibition basketball team called Olson's Terrible Swedes. Known for their on-court antics, this inspired C. M. Olson's wife, Doyle, and the women who worked in her beauty salons to form a professional basketball exhibition team. In 1954, Coach Orwell Moore and his wife Lorene "Butch" Moore bought the Red heads and moved the team to Caraway, Arkansas. Lorene Moore played on the team for eleven years, scoring 35,426 points during her career. The Red Heads were so popular that during the years 1964-1971 there may have been as many as three Red Head teams traveling the country. In 1972, the Red Heads won 500 out of 642 games played against men's team. Throughout the years the All American Red Heads played in all 50 states as well as Mexico, Canada, and the Philippines. The team has been featured in national magazines such as Life, Look, Sports Illustrated and Women's Sports, and they were widely considered as the greatest women's basketball team in the world. Coach Moore retired and disbanded the Red Heads in 1986 after 50 years of play The All American Red Heads still have annual reunions today.

==== Edmonton Commercial Graduates Basketball Club ====
The Edmonton Commercial Graduates Basketball Club was founded in 1915 by John Percy Page. The origins of the club can be traced to the McDougall Commercial Girls High School Basketball team in Edmonton, Canada. When team members graduated high school, they convinced coach John Percy Page to continue the team as a Club sport. Membership with the club was exclusive, only 38 women ever wore the Grad jersey. Winnie Martin (Tait) was the First Captain of the Edmonton Grads, playing from 1915 to 1924. The Grads played 522 games officially in Canada, the United States and Europe. The Club tallied a 502–20 record in 25 years of play The Edmonton Commercial Graduates are widely considered the greatest women's team ever assembled. Financially restrained, members often chipped in to raise funds for national play. Their strong dedication to the game and will to persevere in a time when women's basketball was largely ignored makes the Edmonton Grads praiseworthy John Percy Page coached the club to 18 Canadian Championships The Club attended four sets of Olympic Games: Paris in 1924, Amsterdam in 1928, Los Angeles in 1932, and Berlin in 1936 where they received 4 unofficial Olympic titles The Club played its last game on June 5, 1940, defeating a Chicago team 62-52 Dr. James A. Naismith was quoted to say, "There is no team that I mention more frequently in talking about the game. My admiration is not only for your remarkable record of games won (which itself would make you stand out in the history of basketball) but also for your record of clean play, versatility in meeting teams at their own style, and more especially for your unbroken record of good sportsmanship."

==== Wayland Baptist Flying Queens ====
Claude Hutcherson, a Wayland graduate and owner of Hutcherson Air Service, provided air transportation for the Wayland Baptist Flying Queens to games in Mexico in 1948. That encounter blossomed into a full sponsorship of the team in 1950, a change that brought with it a new mascot - the Hutcherson Flying Queens. Five decades later, Wayland is still atop the world of women's basketball for they still remain the only women's team in history to win 1,300 games. Long before Connecticut became a dominant power in women's basketball, the Flying Queens of Wayland Baptist thrived on innovation, talent and glamour, playing on athletic scholarships, traveling by private planes, warming up with ostentatious drills learned from the Harlem Globetrotters and winning every game for nearly five seasons. The Wayland Baptist University women's team achieved a 131-game winning streak from November 1953 to March 1958 before losing 46–42 to Nashville Business School. During that time the Flying Queens captured four consecutive AAU national championships.

==== Mighty Macs ====
The 1972-74 Mighty Macs team captured the first three Association for Intercollegiate Athletics for Women (AIAW) championships. Immaculata is considered the birthplace of modern college women's basketball. In addition, to winning the first three college national championships, the Mighty Macs were the first women's team along with the University of Maryland to appear on National television. They were also the first women's team, along with Queen's College, to play at Madison Square Garden. Their inspirational story was made into a feature-length theatrical movie called The Mighty Macs and released by Sony Pictures in 2011. The 1972–74 teams have produced 3 Women's Basketball Hall of Fame Inductees. Listed are the individuals associated with the three teams; Janet Ruch Boltz, Denise Conway Crawford, Janet Young Eline, Theresa Shank Grentz (Class of 2001), Barbara Deuble Kelly, Tina Krah, Patricia Mulhern Loughran, Judy Marra Martelli, Sue Forsyth O'Grady, Rene Muth Portland, Betty Ann Hoffman Quinn, Cathy Rush (Class of 2000), Mary Scharff, Marianne Crawford Stanley (Class of 2002), Maureen Stuhlman, and Marie Liguori Williams.

==== Delta State teams ====
The 1975, 1976, and 1977 Delta State teams captured three consecutive AIAW championships. After finishing 16–2 in the 1973-74 revival season following a 40-year layoff of the women's basketball program, Delta State proceeded to end Immaculata College's three-year AIAW national championship reign in season No. 2 by going undefeated at 28–0. Delta State followed its first AIAW national crown by also winning the next two as the Lady Statesmen defeated Immaculata (69–64) at Penn State and then LSU (68–55) at Minnesota. During their three championship years, Delta State compiled a 93–4 record (28–0, 33–1, 32–3), including a then-record 51 straight wins. The 1975–77 teams have produced 2 Women's Basketball Hall of Fame inductees, Margaret Wade and Lusia Harris Stewart. The WBCA Wade Trophy, considered the Heisman of women's basketball, is named in honor of Lily Margaret Wade. Listed are the individuals associated with the three teams: Angel Fortenberry, Ann Logue, Beth Trussell, Cornelia Ward, Debbie Brock, Jackie Caston, Janie Evans, Jill Rhodes, Judy Davis, Kathy Lewis, Key Crump, Laurie Ann Harper, Lusia Harris Stewart (Class of 1999), Lynn Adubato, Mandy Fortenberyy, Margaret Wade (Class of 1999), Mary Logue, Melissa Thames, Melissa Ward, Mimi Williams, Pam Piazza, Ramona von Boeckman, Sheri Haynes, Tish Fahey, Virginia Shackelford, and Wanda Hairston.

==== USA Women's Basketball teams ====
The 1976 USA Women's Basketball team captured the United States' first medal in Olympic women's basketball history winning the silver medal. The USA's silver medal finish served a notice to the rest of the world that the United States would be a force in Olympic women's basketball. Since the 1976 Olympics, the USA Women's Basketball Teams have compiled a record of 55 and 1 and captured 7 gold medals and 1 bronze in Olympic play. The 1976 USA Olympic Women's Basketball Team paved the way for United States dominance. The 1976 team has produced 11 Women's Basketball Hall of Fame Inductees. Ann Meyers Drysdale (Class of 1999), Nancy Lieberman (Class of 1999), Billie Moore (Class of 1999), Pat Summitt (Class of 1999), Mary Anne O'Conner, Lusia Harris Stewart (Class of 1999), Gail Marquis, Nancy Dunkle (Class of 2000), Sue Gunter (Class of 2000), Patricia Roberts (Class of 2000), Sue Rojcewicz (Class of 2000), Charlotte Lewis, Juliene Simpson (Class of 2000), Cindy Brogdon (Class of 2002), Jeanne Rowlands, Gail Weldon.

The 1996 USA Olympic Basketball Team dominated its competition to reclaim the Olympic gold medal in Atlanta. Rolling to an 8-0 Olympic mark, the US, which began training on October 2, 1995, compiled a 52–0 record during its pre-Olympic competition to finish with an overall 60–0 record. More popular than any previous women's basketball team, the USA drew a record 202,556 fans during the Olympics for an average of 25,320 a game. The 1996 Olympic Team includes 10 Women's Basketball Hall of Fame Inductees. Jennifer Azzi (Class of 2009), Ruthie Bolton (Class of 2011), Teresa Edwards (Class of 2010), Venus Lacy, Lisa Leslie (Class of 2015), Rebecca Lobo (Class of 2010), Katrina McClain (Class of 2006), Nikki McCray (Class of 2012), Carla McGhee, Dawn Staley (Class of 2012), Katy Steding, Sheryl Swoopes (Class of 2017), Tara VanDerveer (Class of 2002), Ceal Barry, Nancy Darsch, Marian Washington (Class of 2004), Bruce Moseley, Gina Konin Larence.

==== Helm Foundation ====
The Helms Foundation was established in 1936 and created by Bill Schroeder and Paul Helms to select national championship teams and All-American teams in a number of college sports, including women's basketball. The Panel met annually to vote on a National Champion and retroactively ranked basketball back to 1901. When Paul Helms died in 1957, United Savings and Loan became the Helms Foundation's benefactor and eventually became known as the Citizens Savings Athletic Foundation. The Foundation officially dissolved in 1982. Thirteen Helms Foundation members are also Women's Basketball Hall of Fame Inductees: Alline Banks (Sprouse), Joan Crawford, Lyrlyne Greer, Rita Horkey, Doris Rogers, Margaret Sexton, Hazel Walker, Katherine Washington, Nera White, John Head, Claude Hutcherson, Harley Redin, and Lometa Odom.

== Inductees ==
=== Class of 1999 ===
- Senda Abbott
- Lidia Alexeyeva
- Carol Blazejowski
- Joanne Bracker
- Jody Conradt
- Joan Crawford
- Denise Curry
- Anne Donovan
- Carol Eckman
- Betty Jo Graber
- Lusia Harris-Stewart
- John Head
- Nancy Lieberman
- Darlene May
- Ann Meyers-Drysdale
- Cheryl Miller
- Billie Moore
- Shin-Ja Park
- Harley Redin
- Uljana Semjonova
- Jim Smiddy
- Pat Head Summitt
- Bertha Teague
- Margaret Wade
- Nera White

=== Class of 2000 ===
- Alline Banks Sprouse
- Mildred Barnes
- Barbara "Breezy" Bishop
- E. Wayne Cooley
- Nancy Dunkle
- Olga Sukharnova
- Borislav Stankovic
- Fran Garmon
- Dorothy Gaters
- Sue Gunter
- Rita Horky
- Betty Jaynes
- George E. Killian
- Kim Mulkey-Robertson
- Cindy Noble Hauserman
- Lorene Ramsey
- Patricia (Trish) Roberts
- Sue Rojcewicz
- Cathy Rush
- Juliene Brazinski Simpson
- Katherine Washington
- Dean Weese
- Marcy Weston
- Kay Yow

=== Class of 2001 ===
- Van Chancellor
- Theresa Grentz
- Phyllis Holmes
- LaTaunya Pollard
- Linda K. Sharp
- C. Vivian Stringer
- Vanya Voynova
- Hazel Walker
- Rosie Walker
- Holly Warlick

=== Class of 2002 ===
- Cindy Brogdon
- Hortência Marcari
- Kamie Ethridge
- Margaret Sexton Gleaves
- Sandra Meadows
- Lea Plarski
- Marianne Crawford Stanley
- Tara VanDerveer

=== Class of 2003 ===
- Leon Barmore
- Tara Heiss
- Claude Hutcherson
- Patsy Neal
- Doris Rogers
- Marsha Sharp

=== Class of 2004 ===
- Sylvia Hatchell
- Lurlyne Greer Rogers
- Amy Ruley
- Bev Smith
- Bill Wall
- Marian E. Washington

=== Class of 2005 ===
- Joe Ciampi
- Kelli Litsch
- Hunter Low
- Edna Tarbutton
- Dixie Woodall
- Lynette Woodard

=== Class of 2006 ===
- Geno Auriemma
- Maria Paula Gonçalves da Silva
- Clarissa Davis-Wrightsil
- Janice Lawrence Braxton
- Katrina McClain Johnson
- Barbara Stevens

=== Class of 2007 ===
- Daedra Charles-Furlow
- Bridgette Gordon
- Mel Greenberg
- Pamela Kelly-Flowers
- Andy Landers
- Andrea Lloyd-Curry

=== Class of 2008 ===
- Debbie Ryan
- Patty Broderick
- Lin L. Laursen
- Jill Rankin Schneider
- Suzie McConnell-Serio
- Michelle Timms

=== Class of 2009 ===
- Jennifer Azzi
- Cynthia Cooper
- Jennifer Gillom
- Sonja Hogg
- Jill Hutchison
- Ora Washington

=== Class of 2010 ===
- Leta Andrews
- Teresa Edwards
- Rebecca Lobo
- Gloria Ray
- Teresa Weatherspoon
- Chris Weller

=== Class of 2011 ===
- Val Ackerman
- Ruthie Bolton
- Vicky Bullett
- Muffet McGraw
- Pearl Moore
- Lometa Odom

=== Class of 2012 ===
- Nancy Fahey
- Nikki McCray
- Pamela McGee
- Inge Nissen
- Robin Roberts
- Dawn Staley

=== Class of 2013 ===
- Gary Blair
- Jim Foster
- Peggie Gillom-Granderson
- Jennifer Rizzotti
- Annette Smith-Knight
- Sue Wicks

=== Class of 2014 ===
- Lin Dunn
- Michelle Edwards
- Mimi Griffin
- Yolanda Griffith
- Jasmina Perazić
- Charlotte West

=== Class of 2015 ===
- Janeth Arcain
- Kurt Budke
- Gail Goestenkors
- Janet Harris
- Lisa Leslie
- Brad Smith

=== Class of 2016 ===
- Sherri Coale
- June Courteau
- Joe Lombard
- Jackie Stiles
- Bill F. Tipps
- Natalie Williams

=== Class of 2017 ===
- Sally Bell
- Christine Grant
- Rick Insell
- Louise O'Neal
- Sheryl Swoopes
- Kara Wolters

=== Class of 2018 ===
- Ceal Barry
- Rose Marie Battaglia
- Chris Dailey
- Mickie DeMoss
- Chamique Holdsclaw
- Katie Smith
- Tina Thompson

=== Class of 2019 ===
- Beth Bass
- Carolyn Bush Roddy
- Joan Cronan
- Nora Lynn Finch
- Ticha Penicheiro
- Ruth Riley
- Valerie Still

=== Class of 2021 ===
- Debbie Brock
- Carol Callan
- Swin Cash
- Tamika Catchings
- Sue Donohoe
- Lauren Jackson
- Carol Stiff
- David Stern

=== Class of 2022 ===
- Debbie Antonelli
- Doug Bruno
- Becky Hammon
- DeLisha Milton-Jones
- Paul Sanderford
- Bob Schneider
- Penny Taylor

=== Class of 2023 ===
- Cathy Boswell
- Donna Lopiano
- Lisa Mattingly
- Carolyn Peck
- Lindsay Whalen

=== Class of 2024 ===
- Seimone Augustus
- Rita Gail Easterling
- Taj McWilliams-Franklin
- Maya Moore
- Violet Palmer
- Sue Phillips
- Roonie Scovel

=== Class of 2025 ===
- Alana Beard
- Sue Bird
- Mark Campbell
- Danielle Donehew
- Sylvia Fowles
- Lucille Kyvallos
- Cappie Pondexter

=== Class of 2026 ===
- Elena Delle Donne
- Candace Parker
- Isabelle Fijalkowski
- Amaya Valdemoro
- Cheryl Reeve
- Kim Muhl
- Doris Burke
- Barbara Kennedy-Dixon

== See also ==
- List of sports awards honoring women
- List of members of the Naismith Memorial Basketball Hall of Fame
  - List of players in the Naismith Memorial Basketball Hall of Fame
  - List of coaches in the Naismith Memorial Basketball Hall of Fame
- FIBA Hall of Fame
  - List of members of the FIBA Hall of Fame
- International Women's Sports Hall of Fame
- Women's Basketball Coaches Association
