= Lurlyne Greer =

American basketball player

Personal information
- Born: December 15, 1928
- Died: February 16, 2001 (aged 72) Heber Springs, Arkansas, U.S.

Career highlights
- 8× AAU All-American (1947–1954); Lewis E. Teague Award for most outstanding amateur athlete in the Carolinas (1952); 3× AAU Tournament MVP (1952, 1953, 1954)

Career AAU statistics
- Women's Basketball Hall of Fame
Medals
Women's basketball
Representing the United States
Pan American
Gold medal – first place	1955 Mexico City	Team competition

Lurlyne Ann Greer (later Lurlyne Greer Mealhouse and Lurlyne Greer Rogers) (15 December 1928 - 16 February 2001) was an American basketball player, active during the pre-professional era of women's basketball from the mid-1940s to mid-1950s. Greer set records for the most points in a single game and tournament, captained the US women's national basketball team that won the gold medal at the 1955 Pan American Games and was inducted into the Women's Basketball Hall of Fame in 2004.

== Early life ==
Greer was born on December 15, 1928, and grew up in Des Arc, Arkansas.

== Career ==
Greer played n the AAU All-American league from 1947 to 1954. She played for Cook's Goldblumes, 1948–9. In the 1951–52 season, when Greer played with team Hanes Hosiery, she made forty-one points in one game, which set an AAU tournament record in scoring thirty-five points against the Jackson (Mississippi) Magnolia Whips. As a result, Greer's team-mates called her "the Rock", and the coach Virgil Yow described her as a player who made the team of Hanes Hosiery "great".

In 1952, she received the Lewis E. Teague Memorial Trophy from the Carolinas AAU and was voted Most Valuable Player at the AAU National Championships in 1952, 1953 and 1954.

In 1955, Greer captained the women's basketball team that went to the Mexico City Pan American Games and featured members such as Lometa Odom. She averaged 18.3 points per game and set records for the most points in a single game and in the tournament. She also set several marks for free throws. This was the first time that women's basketball was included in the Pan American Games and the team won the gold medal.

Greer later played for the Arkansas Travellers during the 1956–1957 season led by the coach Hazel Walker. Goose Garroute, a friend of Hazel Walker, thought that Greer "neither fast nor tough enough for their game" and after the season, Walker had to "let her go".

== Life after basketball ==
Following her retirement from basketball, Greer moved to Philadelphia and learned how to run a cemetery business. In the early 1960s, Greer met and married Frank W. Rogers (1921-1991) and the couple developed a cemetery as a retirement and vacation area in Heber Springs, Arkansas. They occasionally hosted old AAU team-mates in the premises. As a habitual smoker, Greer died of pulmonary malignancy on February 16, 2001.

== Recognition ==
Greer was elected into the first Helm's Hall class of women basketball honorees in 1967, and the Women's Basketball Hall of Fame (WBHOF) in the Class of 2004.
