= Betty Jaynes =

Betty Jaynes might refer to:

- Betty Jaynes (actress) (1921–2018), American actress active 1936–1952
- Betty Jaynes (basketball) (1945–2014), American basketball coach
