= United States women's Pan American Games basketball team =

Aspect of USA women's basketball

The Pan American Team is one of the teams under the auspices of the USA Basketball organization. The Pan American Games are held every four years in the year before the Olympics. The first Pan American Games were held in 1951, but those games were men only. The second Pan American games in 1955 included women's teams. Eligible teams are the members of FIBA Americas. The USA has participated every year since the 1955 event, except for 1995, when the game were canceled, due to too few teams committed to play.

Participants in the Pan American games included the very best ever to be part of the sport–ten players ended up in the Naismith Hall of Fame, including Cheryl Miller, Nancy Lieberman and Lusia Harris. Hall of Fame members Jody Conradt, Billie Moore, Cathy Rush, C. Vivian Stringer and Kay Yow were coaches for Pan American teams, while Denise Curry and Pat Summitt participated both as players and coaches.

== History ==
=== AAU era ===
In the early years of the Pan American (Pan Am) games, the players came from the AAU teams. The players for the 1955 team were drawn primarily from Hanes Hosiery Mills, Wayland College Flying Queens, the Dons, and Dowells Dolls. These four teams played each other in a tournament to help select the players for the Pan Am team. Hanes Hosiery came in first ahead of Wayland Baptist. This result would not be surprising, as these were the two dominant teams of the era. Hanes Hosiery won the AAU national championship in 1951, 1952, and 1953, beating Wayland two of those three years, and Wayland would go on to win the national championship the net four years 1954–1957. Not surprisingly, the twelve player Pan American team was dominated by these two teams, with six Wayland Baptist players and three from Hanes Hosiery. While Wayland provided the largest number of players, Hanes provided the captain, Lurlyne Greer Mealhouse, who would score over 18 points per game, more than twice the second highest scorer, and still the third highest scoring average in Pan American history. Greer was considered to be the best AAU player of her era.

The 1959 team continued to draw from AAU ranks, with even more participation from the dominant team of the era, Wayland Baptist College. The team that year was largely made up of the Wayland Baptist team, including the head coach Harley Redin, and a few stars from other teams. The USA team would go on to win all eight games and the gold medal. The AAU influence would continue through 1971, with players from teams like the Raytown Piperettes, and St. Joseph's Pepsi-Cola, along with multiple representatives from the Nashville Business College and Wayland Baptist teams. The coaches were also drawn from these ranks, with Nashville Business College's John Head as head coach in 1963, and a second stint at head coach by Harley Redin in 1971. The USA team was dominant in the beginning, winning the gold medal in their first three appearances, then settled for the silver medal in 1967 and 1971, with the latter team being led by Linda Gamble.

=== College era ===
Although many of the players on earlier teams were playing at colleges, the competitions were organized by the AAU. Over time, the emphasis shifted to college organizations. The Commission on Intercollegiate Athletics for Women started in 1967, then evolved into the Association for Intercollegiate Athletics for Women in 1971. With the enactment of Title IX in 1972, the growth of women's sports in general, and women's basketball in particular, grew significantly in this era. The AIAW organized national championships starting in 1972, and the USA Basketball teams increasing drew from the ranks of the AIAW members.

In 1975, the Pan Am team included players such as Nancy Lieberman, Lusia Harris, Pat Head, and Ann Meyers, and coach Cathy Rush, each of whom would be inducted into the Naismith Memorial Basketball Hall of Fame. The gold medal winning 1975 team was especially dominant, winning all seven games convincingly. The closest game was the final against Brazil, and that game was won by the USA team 74–55.

The 1979 team, with Pat Head now coaching instead of playing, had high hopes to repeat as gold medal winners. Virtually the same team had won the gold at the world Championships, and the gold at the Jones Cup competition. however, the final game pitted undefeated USA against undefeated Cuba, and the Cuban team prevailed, 91–86.

The 1983 team returned to gold medal form, winning all five games in Caracas, Venezuela. The scoring leaders were Cheryl Miller, Lynette Woodard at 19.8 and 19.0 points per game, respectively. The team also included Anne Donovan and Kim Mulkey, now better known as coaches.

== Record ==
- 1955: 1st
- 1959: 1st
- 1963: 1st
- 1967: 2nd
- 1971: 2nd
- 1975: 1st
- 1979: 2nd
- 1983: 1st
- 1987: 1st
- 1991: 3rd
- 1995: Cancelled
- 1999: 3rd
- 2003: 2nd
- 2007: 1st
- 2011: 7th
- 2015: 2nd

== 2011 ==
The 2011 Pan American Games in Guadalajara, Jalisco, Mexico began on 14 October, but the women's basketball events commenced on the 21st. The team practiced in Texas, and left for Mexico on the 18th of October. The head coach of the USA team was Ceal Barry, from the University of Colorado, who was assisted by Jennifer Gillom and Debbie Ryan.

=== USA versus Argentina ===
The USA team fell to Argentina 58-55 in their opening match. The USA team opened strong, ending the first period with a 14-point lead, but the USA team let up, and the Argentines closed the half with a 15-5 run which cut the margin to four. There were six lead changes in the final quarter, but when the USA team failed to convert a layup in the final seconds of the game which would have tied the score, the USA team was forced to foul, and the team from Argentina won by three points. Despite the loss, there were some individual highlights. Breanna Stewart is the only high school player on the team, and the only high school player on a Pan Am team other than Nancy Lieberman. Despite being younger than her teammates, Stewart scored 18 points and pulled down 21 rebounds, setting a Pan Am record for a USA player. Katelan Redmon hit six of her eleven shots to score 16 points for the USA team.

=== USA versus Puerto Rico ===
The USA team lost against Puerto Rico 75-70, in a game that was tied in the fourth quarter. The USA team easily won the rebounding battle 44-28, and shot slightly better than Puerto Rico (38% versus 37%), but had eight more turnovers.

The USA team started strong, scoring the first five points of the game, and extending the lead to 19-5 in the first quarter. However, the USA team only managed eight points in the second quarter, and the half came to a close with the score tied at 33 points apiece. Breanna Stewart had a double-double, with a team high 14 points, and eleven rebounds, tying her with Shante Evans for the rebounding honors.

The second loss eliminates the USA from medal contention, not only stopping the team from defending the 2007 Gold Medal, but removing them from medal contention for the first time In Pan Am history.

=== USA versus Mexico ===
In the final match of the first round, the USA team defeated previously undefeated Mexico 87-58. The host team lead at the end of the first quarter by four points, and still lead at the half by three, but the USA outscored Mexico 35-15 in the third quarter to take a commanding lead. The leading scorer for the USA was again Breanna Stewart, with 17 points. Also scoring in double digits were Christine Flores, April Sykes and Emilie Johnson. Katelan Redmon was the leading rebounder on the team with ten rebounds. The USA finished fourth in their bracket, and go on to play Jamaica for seventh place.

=== USA versus Jamaica ===
After a slow start, the USA team put together an 18-2 run, and coasted to an easy victory over the Jamaica team by a score of 87-41, securing a seventh place overall finish in the event. Tavelyn James was the leading scorer with 19 points, while Shante Evans and Avery Warley each secured ten rebounds. Although still a high school student, Breanna Stewart earned spots in the USA Pan Am competition record books, setting single game rebounds record with 21 rebounds in a game. She also had nine blocks in the competition, putting her in second place, and her 88.5% free throw shooting is the fourth best ever.

== 2015 ==
The 2015 Pan American Games were held from July 10 to 26, 2015 in Toronto, Ontario, Canada, with the official women's basketball events running from July 16 through July 20. The head coach of the USA team was Lisa Bluder, from the University of Iowa, and the two assistants were Michelle Clark-Heard of Western Kentucky University and Scott Rueck of Oregon State University.

=== USA versus Brazil ===
The opening game, held on July 16, was against Brazil. The USA started off strong opening up a 16-point lead in the second quarter but Brazil fought back and took a small two point lead in the third quarter with a 14–0 run. The USA team regrouped and one on an 11–2 run of their own to take over control of the game. Brazil wasn't finished, and cut the lead to four points with just under two minutes to go. The USA held Brazil to only one more score in the final two minutes and won the game 75–39.

=== USA versus Dominican Republic ===
The next day, the USA faced the Dominican Republic. By the end of the first quarter the USA was up 32–6 and cruised to an easy victory. The USA was able to give all 11 players double digit minutes. Five players, led by Stuart had double digit points. Sophie Brunner and Taya Reimer tied for the lead in rebounds with six. Kelsey Plum led the team in assists with five. The final score in favor of the USA was 94–55.

=== USA versus Puerto Rico ===
On Saturday, the USA completed the preliminary rounds with the game against Puerto Rico. The US a jump to an early 7–2 lead with two three-pointers by Jefferson, but Puerto Rico was hitting the three-pointers and trail by only a single .24–23 at the end of the first quarter. Coates and Stewart combined for the first 14 points of the second quarter, but Carla Cortijo Sanchez, who played college ball at the University of Texas, scored 10 points of her own to keep the Puerto Rican team close. Puerto Rico outscored the USA in the third quarter, and were only behind by three points at the beginning of the final quarter. Unfortunately, Cortijo sustained an injury and would be unable to play the rest of the game. She had scored 24 points when she left. Without her, the USA lead grew quickly to double digits than to 18 points. The USA ended with the win 93–77, which secured first place in their group and a place in the quarterfinals. Stewart and Coates ended with 24 and 23 points respectively and each recorded a double double. Jefferson led the team in assists with six.

=== USA versus Cuba ===
In the final preliminary game Cuba faced Canada. Although they were behind by 12 at the end of the third quarter, they mounted a furious comeback and almost pulled out the victory, losing a close game 71–68. That left Canada as the leading team in their group, and Cuba in second place facing the USA in the semifinal. USA fell behind early with Cuba scoring five points before the USA got on the board. The USA came back, but did not take the first lead until less than a minute left in the first quarter. The second quarter belong to Cuba as they outscored the US 20–8 to take an 11-point lead at the half. The USA was down by as much as 14 points early in the second half but the USA responded in the third quarter, outscoring Cuba 20–11. However, the lead still favored Cuba entering the fourth quarter. The game was tied several times in the fourth quarter, and Cuba had a small one point lead with a minute and a half to go in the game. Coates scored to give the USA a lead but Cuba responded to retake the lead. Then, with seconds left in the game Harper drove to the basket and did not score but was fouled. She hit both free throws to give the USA and one point game. Cuba had a final possession to take the lead back but Harper stole the ball to give the close victory to the USA 65–64.

=== USA versus Canada ===
The gold-medal game matched up USA against the host team Canada, in a sold out arena dominated by fans in red and white and waving the Canadian flag. The Canadian team, arm in arm, sang Oh Canada as the respective national anthems were played.

After trading baskets early the US edged out to a double-digit lead in the second quarter. However the Canadians, spurred on by the home crowd cheering, fought back and tied up the game at halftime. In the third quarter, it was Canada's time to shine as they outscore the US 26–15. The lead would reach as high as 18 points. The USA would fight back, but not all the way and Canada won the game and the gold-medal 81–73. It was Canada's first gold-medal in basketball in the Pan Am games. Nurse was the star for Canada with 33 points, hitting 11 of her 12 free-throw attempts in 10 of her 17 field-goal attempts including two of three three-pointers.

== Coaches and results ==
The following people were head coaches, assistant coaches and managers at Pan American competitions:

First	Last	Position	Coached at	Year	W–L	Results	Location
Mildred	Barnes	Manager	Warrensburg, MO	1975	7–0	Gold Medal	Mexico City, Mexico
Ceal	Barry	Head coach	University of Colorado	2011	2–2	7th	Guadalajara, Mexico
Kathi	Bennett	Assistant coach	Indiana University	2003	5–2	Silver Medal	Santo Domingo, Dominican Republic
Joan	Bonvicini	Assistant coach	University of Arizona	1991	4–2	Bronze Medal	Havana, Cuba
Jody	Conradt	Head coach	University of Texas	1987	4–0	Gold Medal	Indianapolis, Indiana, USA
Alberta	Cox	Head coach	Raytown Piperettes (MO)	1967	6–2	Silver Medal	Winnipeg, Manitoba, Canada
Denise	Curry	Assistant coach	California State Fullerton	1999	4–3	Bronze Medal	Winnipeg, Manitoba, Canada
Kathy	Delaney-Smith	Assistant coach	Harvard University (MA)	2007	5–0	Gold Medal	Rio de Janeiro, Brazil
Margaret	Downing	Manager	Southern State College (AR)	1967	6–2	Silver Medal	Winnipeg, Manitoba, Canada
Margaret	Downing	Manager	Southern State College (AR)	1971	5–1	Silver Medal	Cali, Colombia
Lin	Dunn	Manager	Purdue University (IN)	1987	4–0	Gold Medal	Indianapolis, Indiana, USA
Paula	Edney	Head coach	Athletes in Action	1995	Competition Cancelled		Mar del Plata, Argentina
Tonya	Edwards	Assistant coach	Northwestern Community High School (MI)	1995	Competition Cancelled		Mar del Plata, Argentina
Nell	Fortner	Head coach	USA Basketball	1999	4–3	Bronze Medal	Winnipeg, Manitoba, Canada
Fran	Garmon	Head coach	Texas Christian University	1983	5–0	Gold Medal	Caracas, Venezuela
Bill	Gibbons	Assistant coach	The College of the Holy Cross (MA)	2007	5–0	Gold Medal	Rio de Janeiro, Brazil
Peggie	Gillom	Assistant coach	Texas A&M University	1999	4–3	Bronze Medal	Winnipeg, Manitoba, Canada
Jennifer	Gillom	Assistant coach	USA Basketball	2011	2–2	7th	Guadalajara, Mexico
Betty_Jo	Graber	Assistant coach	Weatherford College (TX)	1979	5–1	Silver Medal	San Juan, Puerto Rico
John	Head	Head coach	Nashville Business College (TN)	1963	6–1	Gold Medal	São Paulo, Brazil
Pat	Head	Head coach	University of Tennessee	1979	5–1	Silver Medal	San Juan, Puerto Rico
Phyllis	Holmes	Manager	Greenville College (IL)	1983	5–0	Gold Medal	Caracas, Venezuela
Caddo	Mathews	Head coach	Wayland Col. Flying Queens (TX)	1955	8–0	Gold Medal	Mexico City, Mexico
Colleen	Matsuhara	Assistant coach	University of Texas	1987	4–0	Gold Medal	Indianapolis, Indiana, USA
Tennie	McGhee	Assistant coach	Nashville Business College (TN)	1963	6–1	Gold Medal	São Paulo, Brazil
Laurine	Mickelsen	Manager	AAU (Murray, UT)	1959	8–0	Gold Medal	Chicago, Illinois, USA
Billie	Moore	Assistant coach	Fullerton State University (CA)	1975	7–0	Gold Medal	Mexico City, Mexico
Cindy	Noble-Hauserman	Assistant coach	Centre College (KY)	1995	Competition Cancelled		Mar del Plata, Argentina
Trina	Patterson	Assistant coach	University of Albany (NY)	2003	5–2	Silver Medal	Santo Domingo, Dominican Republic
Lea	Plarski	Manager	St. Louis Community College at Florissant Valley (MO)	1979	5–1	Silver Medal	San Juan, Puerto Rico
Harley	Redin	Head coach	Wayland Baptist College (TX)	1959	8–0	Gold Medal	Chicago, Illinois, USA
Harley	Redin	Head coach	Wayland Baptist College (TX)	1971	5–1	Silver Medal	Cali, Colombia
Olan	Ruble	Assistant coach	Iowa Wesleyan College	1967	6–2	Silver Medal	Winnipeg, Manitoba, Canada
Cathy	Rush	Head coach	Immaculata College (PA)	1975	7–0	Gold Medal	Mexico City, Mexico
Debbie	Ryan	Head coach	University of Virginia	2003	5–2	Silver Medal	Santo Domingo, Dominican Republic
Debbie	Ryan	Assistant coach	University of Virginia (retired)	2011	2–2	7th	Guadalajara, Mexico
Dawn	Staley	Head coach	Temple University	2007	5–0	Gold Medal	Rio de Janeiro, Brazil
Marianne	Stanley	Assistant coach	University of Southern California	1991	4–2	Bronze Medal	Havana, Cuba
C._Vivian	Stringer	Head coach	University of Iowa	1991	4–2	Bronze Medal	Havana, Cuba
Lillian	Van_Blarcom	Manager	AAU (Wichita, KS)	1955	8–0	Gold Medal	Mexico City, Mexico
Dean	Weese	Assistant coach	AAU (Spearman, TX)	1971	5–1	Silver Medal	Cali, Colombia
Kay	Yow	Assistant coach	North Carolina State University	1983	5–0	Gold Medal	Caracas, Venezuela
Lisa	Bluder	Head coach	University of Iowa	2015	4–1	Silver Medal	Toronto, Ontario, Canada
Michelle	Clark-Heard	Assistant coach	Western Kentucky University	2015	4–1	Silver Medal	Toronto, Ontario, Canada
Scott	Rueck	Assistant coach	Oregon State University	2015	4–1	Silver Medal	Toronto, Ontario, Canada

== Players ==
The following players participated on Pan American teams:

First	Last	Year	Played at
Matee	Ajavon	2007	Rutgers
Rita	Alexander	1955	Hutcherson Flying Queens/Wayland Baptist College
Nicky	Anosike	2007	Tennessee
Jayne	Appel	2007	Stanford
C._Phillips	Aspedon	1967	Raytown Piperettes
Jennifer	Azzi	1991	Stanford
Doris	Barding	1963	Nashville Business College
Janice	Beach	1971	Hutcherson Flying Queens/Wayland Baptist College
Catherine	Benedetto	1967	Central Washington
Jenni	Benningfield	2003	Vanderbilt
Carol	Blazejowski	1979	Montclair State College
Carol	Bollinger	1971	Ouachita Baptist
Susan	Britton	1971	Hutcherson Flying Queens/Wayland Baptist College
Barbara	Brown	1979	Stephen F. Austin State
Cindy	Brown	1987	Long Beach State
Edwina	Brown	1999	Texas
Rebekkah	Brunson	2003	Georgetown
Carolyn	Bush	1975	Wayland Baptist
Edna	Campbell	1995	Texas
Ruby	Cannon	1955	Hutcherson Flying Queens/Wayland Baptist College
Ruth	Cannon	1955	Hutcherson Flying QueensWayland Baptist College
Jamie	Carey	2003	Texas
Brona	Coble	1963	Nashville Business College
Marissa	Coleman	2007	Maryland
Cheryl	Cook	1983	Cincinnati
Cynthia	Cooper	1987	Southern California
Joan	Crawford	1959	Nashville Business College
Joan	Crawford	1963	Nashville Business College
Sylvia	Crawley	1995	North Carolina
Sylvia	Crawley	1999	Portland Power
Beth	Cunningham	1999	Philadelphia Rage / Notre Dame
Denise	Curry	1979	UCLA
Denise	Curry	1983	UCLA
Lucille	Davidson	1959	Ray Smith Fords
Clarissa	Davis	1987	Texas
Myrna	DeBerry	1967	Ouachita Baptist
Karen	Deden	1995	Washington
Medina	Dixon	1991	Old Dominion
Anne	Donovan	1983	Old Dominion
Anne	Donovan	1987	Old Dominion
Carolyn	Dornak	1971	Hutcherson Flying Queens/Wayland Baptist College
Nancy	Dunkle	1975	California State Fullerton
Rita	Easterling	1975	Mississippi College-Women
Teresa	Edwards	1987	Georgia
Teresa	Edwards	1991	Georgia
Michelle	Edwards	1991	Iowa
Kamie	Ethridge	1987	Texas
Dena	Evans	1995	Virginia
Shante	Evans	2011	Hofstra
Sandra	Fiete	1963	St. Joseph Pepsi-Cola
Mary_Lois	Finley	1967	Hutcherson Flying Queens/Wayland Baptist College
Christine	Flores	2011	Missouri
Emily	Fox	2007	Minnesota
Eunice	Futch	1955	Hanes Hosiery Mills
Katryna	Gaither	1999	San Jose Lasers / Notre Dame
Linda	Gamble	1971	Ouachita Baptist
Betty	Gaule	1967	Raytown Piperettes Missouri-Kansas City
Jennifer	Gillom	1987	Mississippi
Molly	Goodenbour	1995	Stanford
Bridgette	Gordon	1991	Tennessee
Lola	Ham	1967	Hutcherson Flying Queens/Wayland Baptist College
Lusia	Harris	1975	Delta State
Fran	Harris	1987	Texas
Pat	Head	1975	Tennessee-Martin
Patty_Jo	Hedges	1983	Kentucky
Tara	Heiss	1979	Maryland
Sonja	Henning	1991	Stanford
Amy	Herrig	1999	Iowa
Roneeka	Hodges	2003	Florida State
Rita	Horky	1959	Nashville Business College/Iowa Wesleyan
Rita	Horky	1963	Nashville Business College/Iowa Wesleyan
Alexis	Hornbuckle	2007	Tennessee
Chardé	Houston	2007	Connecticut
Melody	Howard	1995	Southwest Missouri State
Tasha	Humphrey	2007	Georgia
Lisa	Ingram	1983	Northeast Louisiana
Thelma_Gay	Ivey	1959	Clarendon J. C.
Tavelyn	James	2011	Eastern Michigan
Emilie	Johnson	2011	UC Santa Barbara
Evelyn	Jordan	1955	Hanes Hosiery Mills
Marissa	Kastanek	2011	North Carolina State
Kris	Kirchner	1979	Maryland
Joyce	Kite	1959	Hutcherson Flying Queens/Wayland Baptist College
Edith	Kline	1955	Midland Jewelry
Laurie	Koehn	2003	Kansas State
Venus	Lacy	1991	Louisiana Tech
Erlana	Larkins	2007	North Carolina
Janice	Lawrence	1983	Louisiana Tech
Charlotte	Lewis	1975	Illinois State
Nancy	Lieberman	1975	Far Rockaway H. S.
Nancy	Lieberman	1979	Old Dominion
Andrea	Lloyd	1987	Texas
Andrea	Lloyd	1991	Texas
Carla	Lowry	1959	Hutcherson Flying Queens/Wayland Baptist College
Kevi	Luper	2011	Oral Roberts
Michelle	Marciniak	1999	Nashville Noise / Tennessee
Glyna	Masten	1963	Hutcherson Flying Queens/Wayland Baptist College
Judy	Matlock	1967	Raytown Piperettes Missouri-Kansas City
Janel	McCarville	2003	Minnesota
Katrina	McClain	1987	Georgia
Katrina	McClain	1991	Georgia
Angel	McCoughtry	2007	Louisville
Danielle	McCulley	1999	Portland Power / Western Kentucky
Valencia	McFarland	2011	Mississippi
Pam	McGee	1983	Southern California
Carla	McGhee	1995	Tennessee
L._Greer	Mealhouse	1955	Hanes Hosiery Mills/Little Rock J. C.
Ann	Meyers	1975	UCLA
Ann	Meyers	1979	UCLA
Carolyn	Miller	1959	Hutcherson Flying Queens/Wayland Baptist College
Carolyn	Miller	1967	Houston Jets/ Wayland
Cheryl	Miller	1983	Southern California
Loree	Moore	2003	Tennessee
Kim	Mulkey	1983	Louisiana Tech
Patsy	Neal	1959	Hutcherson Flying Queens/Wayland Baptist College
Sally	Nerren	1963	Nashville Business College
Glenda	Nicholson	1959	Iowa Wesleyan
Cindy	Noble	1983	Tennessee
Mary_Ann	O'Connor	1975	Southern Connecticut State
Lometa	Odom	1955	Hutcherson Flying Queens/Wayland Baptist College
Anita	Palmer	1971	Wisconsin
Tari	Phillips	1995	Central Florida
LaTaunya	Pollard	1983	Long Beach State
Nicole	Powell	2003	Stanford
Lynn	Pride	1999	Kansas
Jill	Rankin	1979	Wayland Baptist
Cherri	Rapp	1971	Hutcherson Flying Queens/Wayland Baptist College
Cherri	Rapp	1975	Wayland Baptist
Katelan	Redmon	2011	Gonzaga
Doris	Rogers	1963	Nashville Business College
Sue	Rojcewicz	1975	Southern Connecticut State
Annette_Kay	Rutt	1967	Raytown Piperettes/Illinois State
Norma	Schwarz	1963	Sioux Machinery/Westmar College
Marsha	Scoggin	1959	Hutcherson Flying Queens /Wayland Baptist College
Betty	Scott	1963	Hutcherson Flying Queens/ Wayland Baptist College
Alisa	Scott	1987	Mississippi
Evelyn	Searles	1959	Dowell's Dolls
Becky	Shaw	1971	Raytown Piperettes
Marcia	Shieldknight	1971	Hutcherson Flying Queens/ Wayland Baptist College
Juliene	Simpson	1975	John F. Kennedy College
Barbara_Ann	Sipes	1955	K. C. Dons/ Iowa Wesleyan
Barbara_Ann	Sipes	1967	Raytown Piperettes/ Iowa Wesleyan
Mauriece	Smith	1967	Raytown Piperettes/Missouri-Kansas City
Maurienne	Smithson	1955	Hutcherson Flying Queens/Wayland Baptist College
Dawn	Staley	1995	Virginia
Kayla	Standish	2011	Gonzaga
Katy	Steding	1995	Stanford
June	Stewart	1959	Hutcherson Flying Queens/Wayland Baptist College
Breanna	Stewart	2011	Cicero-North Syracuse H.S./North Syracuse, N.Y.
Andrea	Stinson	1991	North Carolina State
Regina	Street	1991	Memphis State
Ann	Strother	2003	Connecticut
Lois	Stuflick	1971	Parsons College
Jackie	Swaim	1979	Texas
Laura	Switzer	1963	Hutcherson Flying Queens/Wayland Baptist College
Sheryl	Swoopes	1995	Texas Tech
April	Sykes	2011	Rutgers
Lindsay	Taylor	2003	UC Santa Barbara
Mel	Thomas	2007	Connecticut
Iciss	Tillis	2003	Duke
Jan	Trombly	1979	Old Dominion
Barbara	Turner	2003	Connecticut
Itoro	Umoh	1999	Clemson
Sandy	Van_Cleave	1971	Parsons College
Rosie	Walker	1979	Stephen F. Austin State
DeMya	Walker	1999	Virginia
Avery	Warley	2011	Liberty
Holly	Warlick	1979	Tennessee
Katherine	Washington	1959	Hutcherson Flying Queens/Wayland Baptist College
Umeki	Webb	1999	Phoenix Mercury / North Carolina State
Jo_Helen	White	1955	Dowell's Dolls/West Texas State
Valeria	Whiting	1995	Stanford
Sue	Wicks	1987	Rutgers
Candice	Wiggins	2007	Stanford
Lorraine	Williams	1963	Iowa Wesleyan
Mary	Williams	1971	Hutcherson Flying Queens/Wayland Baptist College
Faye	Wilson	1955	Hutcherson Flying Queens/Wayland Baptist College
Dixie	Woodall	1967	Raytown Piperettes
Lynette	Woodard	1983	Kansas
Lynette	Woodard	1991	Kansas
Dana	Wynne	1999	Colorado Xplosion / Seton Hall
Sophie	Brunner	2015	Arizona State
Alaina	Coates	2015	South Carolina
Caroline	Coyer	2015	Villanova
Linnae	Harper	2015	Kentucky
Moriah	Jefferson	2015	Connecticut
Stephanie	Mavunga	2015	North Carolina
Tiffany	Mitchell	2015	South Carolina
Kelsey	Plum	2015	Washington
Taya	Reimer	2015	Notre Dame
Breanna	Stewart	2015	Connecticut
Shatori	Walker-Kimbrough	2015	Maryland
Courtney B.	Williams	2015	Texas A&M

== See also ==
- Basketball at the Pan American Games
- USA Basketball
- USA women's national basketball team
- USA Women's World University Games Team
