= Sue Donohoe =

American basketball coach (1959–2020)

Susan Donohoe (August 15, 1959 – December 13, 2020) was an American basketball coach.

== Life and career ==
Donohoe started her coaching career as a graduate assistant for the Louisiana Tech women's basketball program in 1981. She was notable for her contributions to Louisiana Tech women's basketball and helped them win their first NCAA women's basketball tournament. She also worked as a women's basketball coach at Stephen F. Austin State University.

In 1999, she joined NCAA.

Between 2003 and 2011, she served as the vice president of NCAA Division I Women's Basketball.

In 2017, she received the Dave Dixon Louisiana Sports Leadership Award from the Louisiana Sports Hall of Fame.

In 2020, she died at the age of 61.

== Recognition ==
- Women's Basketball Hall of Fame
