= Cincinnati Bearcats women's basketball =

2026–27 Cincinnati Bearcats women's basketball team
- University: University of Cincinnati
- Head coach: Katrina Merriweather (3rd season)
- Location: Cincinnati, Ohio
- Arena: Fifth Third Arena (capacity: 12,012)
- Conference: Big 12
- Nickname: Bearcats
- Colors: Red and black

NCAA Division I tournament second round
- 2002

NCAA Division I tournament appearances
- 1989, 1999, 2002, 2003

Conference tournament champions
- 2002

Uniforms
Home	Away

The Cincinnati Bearcats women's basketball team represents the University of Cincinnati (UC) in women's basketball. The school competes in the Big 12 Conference in Division I of the National Collegiate Athletic Association (NCAA). The Bearcats play in Fifth Third Arena on the UC campus in Cincinnati, Ohio.

== Retired jerseys ==
Cincinnati Bearcats retired numbers
No.	Player	Position	Tenure
24	Cheryl Cook	F	1982–1985

== Season-by-season results ==
As of before the 2024–25 season, the Bearcats have a 702–691 record, with four appearances in the NCAA Tournament (1989, 1999, 2002, and 2003) with one Second Round appearance in 2002. They have one conference championship (2002), while finishing runner up in 1999, 2001, and 2003, all while still being in Conference USA.

Record table
Season	Coach	Overall	Conference	Standing	Postseason
Mary Jo Huismann (Independent) (1971–1973)
1971–72	Cincinnati	3–6	—	—	—
1972–73	Cincinnati	7–11	—	—	—
1973–74	Cincinnati	9–6	—	—	
Mary Jo Huismann:		19–23 (.452)	0–0 (–)		
Tom Thacker (Independent) (1974–1978)
1974–75	Cincinnati	14–8	—	—	
1975–76	Cincinnati	17–8			
1976–77	Cincinnati	14–13			
1977–78	Cincinnati	10–14			
Tom Thacker:		55–43 (.561)	0–0 (–)		
Juliene Simpson (Independent) (1978–1979)
1978–79	Cincinnati	12–18			
Juliene Simpson:		12–18 (.400)	0–0 (–)		
Ceal Barry (Independent) (1979–1983)
1979–80	Cincinnati	18–12			
1980–81	Cincinnati	27–9			NWIT
1981–82	Cincinnati	19–10			
1982–83	Cincinnati	19–11			
Ceal Barry:		83–42 (.664)	0–0 (–)		
Sandy Smith (Metro Conference) (1983–1986)
1983–84	Cincinnati	16–12	3–7		
1984–85	Cincinnati	16–12	4–6		
1985–86	Cincinnati	17–13	4–5		
Sandy Smith:		49–37 (.570)	11–18 (.379)		
Laurie Pirtle (Metro Conference) (1986–1991)
1986–87	Cincinnati	6–22	3–9		
1987–88	Cincinnati	18–11	7–5		
1988–89	Cincinnati	21–9	6–6		NCAA first round
1989–90	Cincinnati	7–21	3–11		
1990–91	Cincinnati	4–23	2–12		
Laurie Pirtle (Great Midwest Conference) (1991–1995)
1991–92	Cincinnati	11–17	3–7		
1992–93	Cincinnati	13–15	4–6		
1993–94	Cincinnati	9–18	4–8		
1994–95	Cincinnati	7–20	4–8		
Laurie Pirtle (Conference USA) (1995–2005)
1995–96	Cincinnati	8–19	4–10		
1996–97	Cincinnati	17–11	6–8		
1997–98	Cincinnati	21–9	10–6		WNIT
1998–99	Cincinnati	22–9	12–4		NCAA first round
1999–00	Cincinnati	18–13	9–7		WNIT
2000–01	Cincinnati	22–10	9–7		WNIT
2001–02	Cincinnati	27–5	11–3		NCAA second round
2002–03	Cincinnati	23–8	11–3		NCAA first round
2003–04	Cincinnati	15–16	5–9		WNIT
2004–05	Cincinnati	9–19	4–10		
Laurie Pirtle (Big East Conference) (2005–2007)
2005–06	Cincinnati	17–12	7–9		
2006–07	Cincinnati	15–14	6–10		
Laurie Pirtle:		311–301 (.508)	130–158 (.451)		
J. Kelley Hall (Big East Conference) (2007–2009)
2007–08	Cincinnati	12–16	3–13		
2008–09	Cincinnati	14–17	3–13		
J. Kelley Hall:		26–33 (.441)	6–26 (.188)		
Jamelle Elliott (Big East Conference) (2009–2013)
2009–10	Cincinnati	12–18	4–12	14th	
2010–11	Cincinnati	9–20	2–14	15th	
2011–12	Cincinnati	16–16	6–10	T–10th	WNIT Second Round
2012–13	Cincinnati	12–18	4–12	13th	
Jamelle Elliott (American Athletic Conference) (2013–2018)
2013–14	Cincinnati	13–18	5–11	8th	
2014–15	Cincinnati	8–23	4–14	9th	
2015–16	Cincinnati	8–22	4–14	9th	
2016–17	Cincinnati	16–14	7–9	7th	
2017–18	Cincinnati	19–13	10–6	4th	WNIT First Round
Jamelle Elliot:		113–162 (.412)	46–102 (.311)		
Michelle Clark-Heard (American Athletic Conference) (2018–2023)
2018–19	Cincinnati	24–11	12–4	3rd	WNIT Quarterfinals
2019–20	Cincinnati	22–9	11–5	2nd	Cancelled
2020–21	Cincinnati	8–16	6–12	3rd	
2021–22	Cincinnati	11–17	4–11	11th	
2022–23	Cincinnati	9–21	2–14	11th	
Michelle Clark-Heard:		74–74 (.500)	35–46 (.432)		
Katrina Merriweather (Big 12 Conference) (2023–present)
2023–24	Cincinnati	14–18	5–13	11th	WNIT Second Round
2024–25	Cincinnati	15–14	7–11	10th	
2024–25	Cincinnati	1–3			
Katrina Merriweather:		30–35 (.453)	12–24 (.333)		
Total:		718–708			
National champion Postseason invitational champion Conference regular season champion Conference regular season and conference tournament champion Division regular season champion Division regular season and conference tournament champion Conference tournament champion

1.Cancelled due to the Coronavirus Pandemic

== NCAA tournament results ==
Year	Seed	Round	Opponent	Result
1989	#8	First Round	#9 Bowling Green	L 59–69
1999	#12	First Round	#5 Oregon	L 56–65
2002	#6	First Round; Second Round	#11 Saint Peter's #3 South Carolina	W 76–63 (OT); L 56–75
2003	#10	First Round	#7 Arkansas	L 57–71
