= Carol Eckman =

American basketball coach

Carol Ann Eckman (January 11, 1938 – July 30, 1985) was an American women's basketball coach and was known as the "Mother of the Women's Collegiate Basketball Championship".

She was the basketball coach at West Chester University from 1967–72 and helped organize the first collegiate women’s basketball championship tournament in 1969. Her team, the Golden Rams, won the national championship game each of the next three years. She had a 68–5 record in her five seasons as the coach of West Chester University.

The annual Carol Eckman Award is given by the Women's Basketball Coaches Association to a women's college basketball coach.

In 1999, she was inducted into the Women's Basketball Hall of Fame.

Eckman was born in Berlin, Pennsylvania, to Frank Eckman, the son of Swedish immigrants, and Grace Smearman, of German descent. She died in Williamsport, Pennsylvania.
