= Ceal Barry =

American basketball player and coach, college athletics administrator

Biographical details
- Born: April 1, 1955 (age 71); Louisville, Kentucky, U.S.

Playing career
- 1973–1977: Kentucky
- Position: Forward

Coaching career (HC unless noted)
- 1977–1979: Cincinnati (grad. asst.)
- 1979–1983: Cincinnati
- 1983–2005: Colorado
- 2011: United States

Administrative career (AD unless noted)
- 2005–2020: Colorado (assoc. AD)
- 2013: Colorado (interim AD)

Head coaching record
- Overall: 510–284
- Tournaments: 16–11 (NCAA); 1–1 (WNIT); 1–2 (NWIT)

Accomplishments and honors

Championships
- 4× Big Eight regular season (1989, 1993–1995); 4× Big Eight tournament (1989, 1992, 1995–1996); Big 12 Tournament (1997)

Awards
- 4× Big Eight Coach of the Year (1989, 1993–1995); Carol Eckman Award (1995)
- Women's Basketball Hall of Fame

Adele Cecilia "Ceal" Barry (born April 1, 1955) is an American retired basketball player and coach. She was head women's basketball coach at the University of Cincinnati from 1979 to 1983 and University of Colorado Boulder from 1983 to 2005. Barry was also a longtime college athletics administrator, having been associate athletic director and senior woman administrator at Colorado from 2005 to 2020 and interim athletic director at Colorado in 2013. She was inducted into the Colorado Women's Hall of Fame in 1997 and into the Women's Basketball Hall of Fame in 2018.

== Early life and education ==
Born and raised in Louisville, Kentucky, Barry graduated from Assumption High School in Louisville in 1973. Barry then enrolled at the University of Kentucky and played at guard for four seasons on the Kentucky Wildcats women's basketball team, and she graduated in 1977 with a bachelor's degree in accounting.

== Coaching career ==
From 1977 to 1979, Barry was a graduate assistant at the University of Cincinnati. After she completed her M.Ed. in 1979, Barry was promoted to head coach, where she would remain for four seasons and left with an 83–42 cumulative record.

On April 12, 1983, the University of Colorado Boulder hired Barry as head coach for Colorado Buffaloes women's basketball, replacing Sox Walseth. In 22 seasons, Barry had a 427–242 cumulative record, as well as four Big Eight Conference "Coach of the Year" honors (1989, 1993–95) and the Carol Eckman Award in 1995. The 1988–89 team went 14–0 in Big Eight play, the first team in conference history to go undefeated in conference play. In 2002, she became the first woman to be a head coach for 20 years at Colorado.

Barry returned to coaching in the 2011 Pan American Games as head coach of the US women's basketball team, who finished in seventh place.

== Administrative career ==
On April 1, 2005, nearly a month after ending her coaching career, Barry became associate athletic director for student services and senior woman's administrator at Colorado. She then served as interim athletic director for nearly two months effective June 3, 2013, prior to Rick George entering the position long term. In 2014, Barry changed to senior associate athletic director for internal relations while continuing her role as senior woman's administrator. On July 1, 2020, Barry retired from Colorado and concluded a 43-year career in college athletics as a coach and administrator.

== Awards and honors ==
Barry was inducted into the Colorado Women's Hall of Fame in 1997 and into the Women's Basketball Hall of Fame in 2018.

== Head coaching record ==
Record table
Season	Team	Overall	Conference	Standing	Postseason
Cincinnati Bearcats (Metro Conference) (1979–1983)
1979–80	Cincinnati	18–12			
1980–81	Cincinnati	27–9			NWIT Consolation
1981–82	Cincinnati	19–10			
1982–83	Cincinnati	19–11			
Cincinnati:		83–42			
Colorado Buffaloes (Big Eight Conference) (1983–1996)
1983–84	Colorado	10–18	3–11	7th	
1984–85	Colorado	6–22	2–12	8th	
1985–86	Colorado	21–9	9–5	T–2nd	
1986–87	Colorado	14–14	6–8	T–6th	
1987–88	Colorado	21–11	8–6	T–3rd	
1988–89	Colorado	27–4	14–0	1st	NCAA Second Round
1989–90	Colorado	17–11	10–4	T–2nd	
1990–91	Colorado	18–11	8–6	T–2nd	
1991–92	Colorado	22–9	11–3	2nd	NCAA First Round
1992–93	Colorado	27–4	12–2	1st	NCAA Elite Eight
1993–94	Colorado	27–5	12–2	1st	NCAA Sweet 16
1994–95	Colorado	30–3	14–0	1st	NCAA Elite Eight
1995–96	Colorado	26–9	9–5	2nd	NCAA Second Round
Colorado Buffaloes (Big 12 Conference) (1996–2005)
1996–97	Colorado	23–9	12–4	T–2nd	NCAA Sweet 16
1997–98	Colorado	12–16	5–11	8th	
1998–99	Colorado	15–14	7–9	T–8th	WNIT Second Round
1999–2000	Colorado	10–19	4–12	10th	
2000–01	Colorado	22–9	11–5	4th	NCAA Second Round
2001–02	Colorado	24–10	11–5	T–3rd	NCAA Elite Eight
2002–03	Colorado	24–8	11–5	4th	NCAA Sweet 16
2003–04	Colorado	22–8	11–5	3rd	NCAA First Round
2004–05	Colorado	9–19	2–14	T–11th	
Colorado:		427–242			
Total:		510–284			
National champion Postseason invitational champion Conference regular season champion Conference regular season and conference tournament champion Division regular season champion Division regular season and conference tournament champion Conference tournament champion
