= Rita Horky =

American basketball player and coach

Medal record

Women's basketball

Pan American Games
| Gold medal – first place | 1959 Chicago USA | Team competition |
| Gold medal – first place | 1963 Brazil | Team competition |

Rita Horky is a former women's basketball player and coach from Blissfield, Michigan. Horky was inducted into the Women's Basketball Hall of Fame in 2000.

== Basketball career ==
Horky played for Nashville Business College. She also played for the Iowa Wesleyan College Tigerettes, an AAU team in 1959 and 1960. The 5 foot 11 inch guard was named AAU All-American five times. She was a Pan American gold medalist twice (1959 and 1963), the USA's leading scorer in 1959 with 11.9 points per game, and their 3rd leading scorer in 1963 with 7.7 points/game. Her team finished 4th in the World Championship in 1964 and 11th in 1967.

Horky coached the Northern Illinois women's basketball team for one year in 1982–83, leading them to a 13–14 record.

== Awards and honors ==
In 2000, Horky was elected to the Women's Basketball Hall of Fame, located in Knoxville, Tennessee. She was elected to the Iowa Wesleyan Athletic Hall of Fame in 2004.
