= Juliene Simpson =

American former basketball player (born 1953)

Juliene Brazinski Simpson
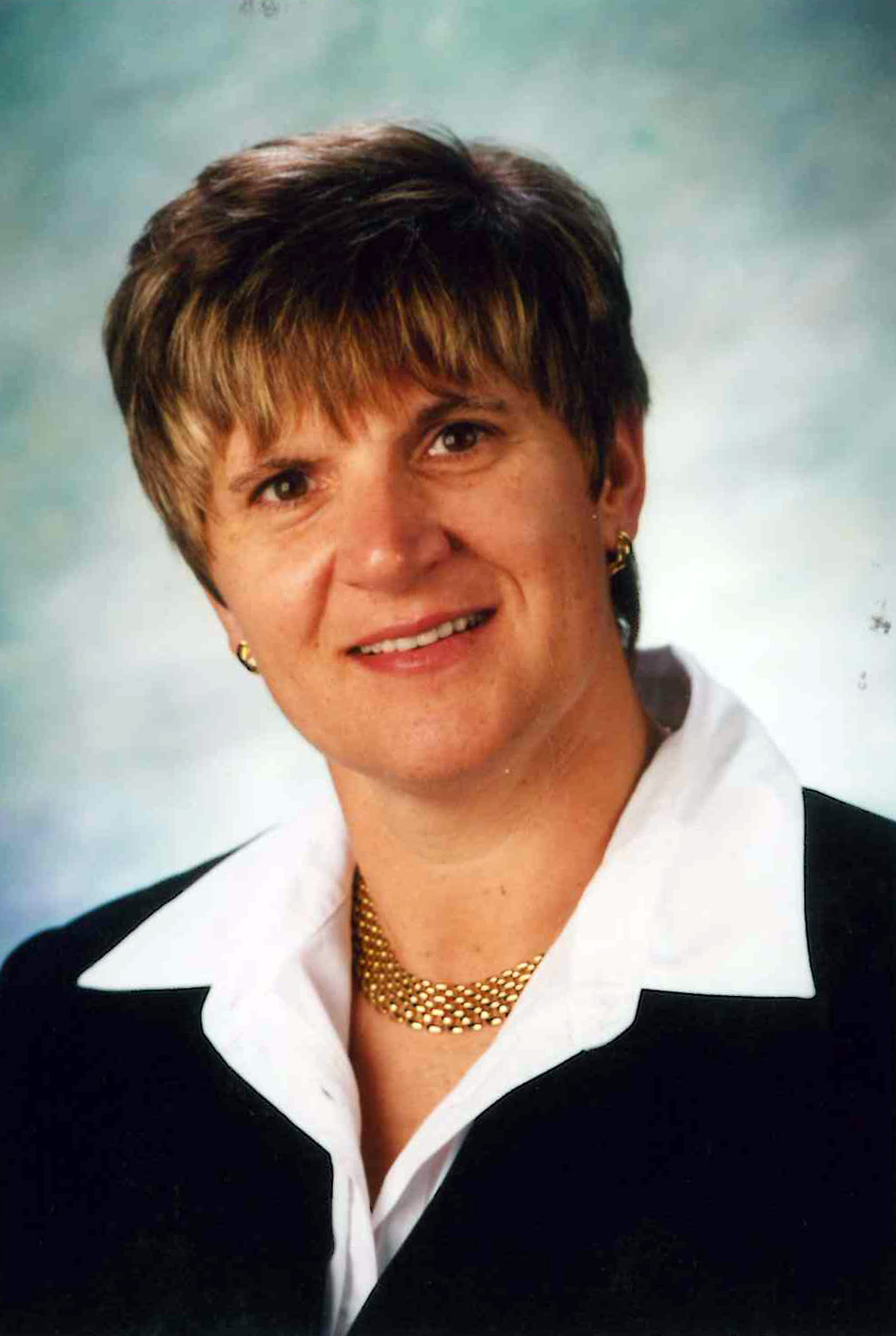

Current position
- Title: Retired

Biographical details
- Born: January 20, 1953 (age 73); Elizabeth, New Jersey, U.S.
- Education: John F. Kennedy College

Playing career
- 1970–1974: John F. Kennedy College
- Position: Point guard

Coaching career (HC unless noted)
- 1977–1978: Amarillo Junior College
- 1978–1979: Cincinnati
- 1979–1987: Arizona State
- 1988–1991: Whitworth
- 1991–1997: Bucknell
- 1997–2001: Marshall
- 2001–2009: East Stroudsburg University

Administrative career (AD unless noted)
- 2009–2020: Saint Elizabeth University

Accomplishments and honors

Awards
- Naismith Memorial Basketball Hall of Fame (team), 2023 National Polish-American Sports Hall of Fame, 2017 Carol Ekman Integrity in Coaching Award, 2001 Women's Basketball Hall of Fame, 2000 Patriot League Coach of the Year, 1996 Northwest Conference of Independent Colleges Coach of the Year, 1990 Western Collegiate Athletic Association Coach of Year, 1987
- Women's Basketball Hall of Fame
Medal record
Women's basketball
Representing the United States
Olympic Games
| Silver medal – second place | 1976 Montreal | Team competition |
World University Games
| Silver medal – second place | 1973 Moscow | Team competition |
Pan American
| Gold medal – first place | 1975 Mexico City | Team Competition |

Juliene Brazinski Simpson (born January 20, 1953) is an American former basketball player who competed in the 1976 Summer Olympics. Simpson and her 1976 USA Olympic women's basketball teammates were inducted into the Naismith Memorial Basketball Hall of Fame in 2023.

== USA Basketball ==
Born in Elizabeth, New Jersey, Simpson (Brazinski at the time) was named to the team representing the U.S. at the 1973 World University Games competition in Moscow, Soviet Union. It was the eighth such competition, but the first one in which the USA competed in women's basketball. The USA team had to play the Soviet Union in the opening round, and lost to the hosts, 92–43. The USA team bounced back and won their next two games. After preliminary play, the teams moved into medal rounds, where the first round loss carried over. In the medal round, the USA won their next three games, including a match against 6–0 Cuba, which the USA won 59–44. That sent them to the gold medal game, but against the host Soviet Union, now 7–0. The USSR won to capture the gold medal, while the USA finished with a silver in their first competition.

In 1975, Simpson played for the USA team in the Pan American Games held in Mexico City, Mexico. The USA team had finished second in 1967 and 1971, but won all seven games at the 1975 event to capture their first gold medal since 1963.

Simpson earned a spot on the USA National team, which competed in the 1975 World Championship held in Cali, Colombia. The USA team lost their opening round game by two points to Japan 73–71. After winning the next game, they faced Czechoslovakia who won by a single point 66–65. This sent the USA team to the consolation rounds, where it won three of four, but dropped a game to Canada 74–68. The USA finished the competition in eighth place.

Simpson continued with the National team to the 1976 Olympics, held in Montreal, Quebec, Canada. After losing the opening game to Japan, the USA team beat Bulgaria, but then faced host team Canada. Serving as the team's co-captain with Pat Head Summitt, Simpson scored 14 points, second only to Nancy Dunkle's 17 points, to help the USA team defeat Canada 84–71. After losing to the USSR, the USA team needed a victory against Czechoslovakia to secure a medal. Simpson scored ten points, to help the team to an 83–67 win and the silver medal. During the 1976 Olympic games, Simpson scored a perfect 1.000 percent from the free throw line, connecting on all 16 of her attempts from the charity stripe, which remains the Olympic record to date.

== Coaching career ==
Following her playing career, she got her first head coaching position at Amarillo Junior College. After one season she moved on to become the University of Cincinnati women's basketball coach. A year later, Simpson was named the head women's basketball coach at Arizona State University. During her eight seasons at Arizona State University, she became the second-most-winning coach in program history with over 300 wins. Two of her teams were ranked in the top 20, which included a berth in the sweet 16 and a runner-up finish in the women's national invitational tournament.

Simpson was named Western Collegiate Athletic Association Coach of the Year, Regional Coach of the Year, and also had a highest university sports team, GPA six out of her eight seasons. Following her time at Arizona State, Juliene went on to coach six seasons of Bucknell University, which included a Patriot League Championship in 1996. In 1997, Simpson moved on to coach four seasons at Marshall University, followed by eight more seasons at East Stroudsburg University.

In 2000, Simpson was inducted into the Women's Basketball Hall of Fame.

In 2001, she was the recipient of the Carol Ekman Award given out by the Women's Basketball Coaches Association, and in 2009 Simpson became the director of athletics at the College of Saint Elizabeth.

On June 22, 2017, Simpson was one of four new inductees into the National Polish-American Sports Hall of Fame in Troy, Michigan.

== Early life and family ==
Simpson was born Juliene Brazinski on January 20, 1953, in Elizabeth, New Jersey the daughter of Joseph and Ruth Brazinski. She has two siblings: older sister Joanne and older brother Joseph.

In 1973, she married Michael Simpson, whom she met at John F. Kennedy College. They have two daughters: Jennifer Simpson Carr and Shannon Simpson who both played basketball at East Stroudsburg University.
