= Mary Anne O'Connor =

Basketball player

Personal information
- Born: October 1, 1953 (age 73) Bridgeport, Connecticut, U.S.
- Listed height: 5 ft 10 in (1.78 m)
- Listed weight: 158 lb (72 kg)

Career information
- High school: Notre Dame Girls High School, Bridgeport, CT
- College: Southern Connecticut State University, New Haven, CT (1971–1975)
- Playing career: 1976–1984; French League:Nationale Feminine 1A

Career history
- 1976–1978: Cleremont UC, CUC (Clermont-Ferrand)
- 1978–1984: Stade Français (Paris)

Career highlights
- Championne de France 1977, 1978, 1980, 1983, 1984
Medals
Representing United States
Women's basketball
Olympic Games
Silver medal – second place	1976 Montreal	Team competition
Pan American Games
Gold medal – first place	1975 Mexico	Team competition

Mary Anne O'Connor (born October 1, 1953) is an American Olympian who competed in the 1976 Summer Olympics on the first US Olympic women's basketball team.

== Early life ==
O'Connor grew up in Fairfield, Connecticut, the first child of six to Marie Roberts O'Connor and Raymond O'Connor. Her mother graduated from the University of Connecticut and was a forward on the women's basketball team. She had a career as an RN, and after earning her MS at Fairfield University, became a nursing professor. Her father Raymond graduated from Fairfield University where he was President of the Glee Club and later earned his MS. He had a career teaching science in Fairfield, Connecticut public schools.

== Athletic accomplishments ==
=== High school ===
O'Connor attended Notre Dame Girls High School in Bridgeport Connecticut and lettered in three sports: softball, field hockey, and basketball. Joining her on all three teams was her younger sister Eileen. Both O'Connor's were on the basketball team during two undefeated seasons in 1970 and 1971. They were coached by Ann DeLuca, who also played semi-professional softball with the Raybestos Brakettes. Mary Anne also swam competitively along with all 5 of her siblings: Eileen, Peggy, John, Katy, and Patrick.

=== College ===
O'Connor attended Southern Connecticut State University and in her freshman year, she was selected to play on the varsity basketball team. Southern's team was ranked third in the nation in '73 and '74. She was a member of Southern's team that reached the semi-finals of the Nationals in 1973, 1974, and 1975, coached by Louise O'Neal. Teammates included her sister Eileen, Joan Bonvicini, and Sue Rojcewicz the latter of whom later joined her as a player on both the 1975 US National and 1976 Olympic teams. O'Connor was an All American and was selected for the US National Team in 1974 and 1975. She was awarded the Outstanding Scholar Athlete Award in 1975 was inducted into the SCSU Hall of Fame in 1987. Following graduation, O'Connor took an Assistant Coach position at Southern and helped coach the team to the Nationals in 1976.

=== Olympics and international competition ===
As a member of the 1974 US National team, O'Connor toured the US playing in six exhibition games against the USSR. In 1975, she was on the team that competed at the FIBA World Championship games in Colombia where the United States compiled a 4–3 record and finished in eighth place. O'Connor was the second leading scorer on the team, averaging 10.9 points per game. At the Pan AM games in Mexico City, they won the gold medal. As a member of the 1976 US Olympic basketball team, O'Connor won a Silver Medal in the Summer Olympics in Montreal.

=== Professional ===
Shortly after the Olympics, O'Connor moved to France after being recruited by a French basketball team, Clermont UC (CUC). She played for them for two years along with the French international star, Irene Guidotti. Other teammates included Dominique LeRay and Élisabeth Riffiod, whose son Boris Diaw played in the NBA (2003–2017). O'Connor was on the team as they continued their reign as French national champions in 1977 and 1978. In 1977 they were also finalists in the European Cup of Champions (Coupe de Europe). In 1978, Mary Anne moved to Paris and played for Stade Francais for six years along with Guidotti, LeRay, and Paoline Ekambi. At the time, the team had just come up to Division One and went on to become the national champion, Championne de France, in 1980 1983, and 1984.Photo of Mary Anne – jersey 14- and her teammates in 1984

== Other professional ==
After retiring from basketball, O'Connor earned her MBA from University of Hartford, Paris and worked at a French company that provided European financial data to the markets in London and New York. She returned to the US in 1990 and worked as an independent IT consultant in New York City. O'Connor relocated to California in 1992 and co-founded an IT and Operations consulting firm in the San Francisco Bay area, O'Connor and Harrigan Associates, LLC, where she continues to consult.

== Personal life ==
O'Connor and Ada Harrigan married in 2014. As of 2021, they have been together for thirty years.

== Honors and Hall of Fame Inductions ==
- Naismith Basketball Hall of Fame inductee, 2023, member of 1976 women's Olympic Basketball Team
- Notre Dame High School Hall of Fame, 1986 (softball and basketball)
- Preseason All-American, 1974–1975
- Southern Connecticut State University Hall of Fame, 1987
- Connecticut Women's Basketball Hall of Fame, 1988
- New England Basketball Hall of Fame, 2003
- Stade Francais Centennial Award, 1983, awarded by the French Minister of Sport
- Women Institute on Sport and Education Hall of Fame, 1996
- Women's Basketball Hall of Fame, 1976 Olympic team member, "Trailblazers of the Game", June 2014
