= Alline Banks Sprouse =

American basketball player (1921–2018)

Personal information
- Born: June 26, 1921 Manchester, Tennessee, U.S.
- Died: March 11, 2018 (aged 96)
- Listed height: 5 ft 11 in (1.80 m)

Career information
- High school: Buchanan (Murfreesboro, Tennessee)
- Position: Small forward
- Women's Basketball Hall of Fame

Alline Banks Sprouse (June 26, 1921 – March 11, 2018) was an American basketball player and is a member of the Women's Basketball Hall of Fame (enshrined in 2000).

== Early life ==
Sprouse was born in Manchester, Tennessee, United States. She played basketball while in grammar school, but when she reached high school, her local high school, Manchester High, did not have a girls team. There were family members living in Murfreesboro, about 30 miles from Manchester, so she stayed with family and attended Buchanan High which did have a girls team. At this time, the game was played on a court laid out in the same way as established by the founder of women's basketball, Senda Berenson, in 1891. The rule "divides the court into three equal sections and requires players to stay in their section". Because Sprouse was tall for her age, and the Buchanan coaches did not know her ability, she was assigned to the center section. In fairness, Sprouse wasn't even sure she had a chance to make the team so wasn't in a position to push for the higher profile forward position. However, one of the forwards on the team came down sick and the coach was forced to give Sprouse a chance at the forward position. She scored 42 points in that game. Later, she would explain, "From then on I was a forward".

She was a starter for all four years of her high school career, averaging 36 points a game as a senior.

== AAU ==
She enrolled at Nashville Business College at the age of 16 before even graduating from high school to play on their AAU team. In her first year on the team she earned All-American honorable mention. In the 12 years between 1939 and 1950 she was named an All-American 11 times. In 1940, while still a teenager, Sprouse helped Nashville Business College upset the top-seeded (and defending champion) Galveston Anicos in the semi-finals. Despite losing to the Little Rock Travelers, led by Hazel Walker, in the finals, Sprouse's performance was strong enough to earn the MVP honors for the tournament. She would go on to win the MVP honors seven times.

She injured her right shoulder in one game, so seriously that she was having difficulty moving her arm. The doctor came to see her in our hotel room and informed her that she would not be able to play the next day. That wasn't acceptable to Sprouse, so she directed the doctor to tape her right arm to her body. Despite being right-handed, she played the next day with the right arm taped against her body and scored 56 points.
