= Fran Garmon =

American basketball coach

Coaching career (HC unless noted)
- 1962–1979: Temple JC
- 1979–1983: Delta State
- 1983–1993: TCU

Head coaching record
- Overall: 537–411 (.566)
- Women's Basketball Hall of Fame

Fran Garmon is an American basketball coach. Her collegiate heading coaching career included position at Temple Junior College, Delta State, and Texas Christian University. She was active in the USA Basketball, serving as head coach of the gold medal winning World University Games team in 1979 and the Pan American Games team in 1983. She also held leadership positions with the US national team. Garmon was inducted into the Women's Basketball Hall of Fame in 2000.

== Early years ==
Garmon had interest in basketball as early as the age of 5 when "her cousin Gene Morris held her up high enough to put a ball through a hoop". She played high school basketball at Moody High School, playing the two-division court, six player system in vogue at the time.

== College playing career ==
She initially enrolled in Temple Junior College, then went on to the University of Mary Hardin–Baylor, where she played basketball for the school as well as an independent team. She went on to earn a master's degree at Baylor.

== Coaching career ==
Garmon then returned to Temple Junior College in 1963, where she persuaded the athletic director and the school president to let her start a women's basketball program. At this time, there were not a lot of options for opponents so she scheduled anyone who would be willing to play including high schools and four-year colleges. She had a challenging start to her college coaching career as her team lost their first seven games, but they went on to win the next nine. She had no scholarships in her first year but the school president gave her four scholarships for the subsequent year. She remained at Temple Junior College until 1979, winning 383 games against 157 losses. Her 1975 team won the first National Junior College Athletic Association national championship, beating Northern Iowa Area Community College 59–58. Although a junior-college, she sometimes scheduled four-year schools such as UCLA. They competed in one national invitational tournament and defeated UCLA, which led her to say with a smile, “(That) was a big mistake because then they banned all junior colleges from it after that,”.

In 1979, Garmon took over the head coaching duties at Delta State. This was one of the premier women's basketball teams of the era — the team had won the AIAW national championship in three consecutive years – 1974 – 1977. She remained there for four years with a record of 76–63. After Delta state, Garmon spent a decade at Texas Christian University where her teams were 78–192 between 1983 and 1993.

In March 2018, Garmon was invited to the second round women's NIT game held at TCU, where she was honored at halftime for winning the Jostens-Berenson Lifetime Achievement Award.

== Coaching record ==
Record table
Season	Team	Overall	Conference	Standing	Postseason
Delta State Lady Statesmen (Gulf South Conference) (1979–1983)
1979–80	Delta State	17–15			
1980–81	Delta State	22–17			
1981–82	Delta State	24–15			
1982–83	Delta State	13–16			
Delta State:		76–63 (.547)			
Texas Christian University (Southwest Conference) (1983–1993)
1983–84	TCU	6–22	1–15	9th	
1984–85	TCU	6–21	2–14	T-8th	
1985–86	TCU	5–22	1–15	9th	
1986–87	TCU	10–17	3–13	9th	
1987–88	TCU	12–15	5–11	T-7th	
1988–89	TCU	9–16	4–12	8th	
1989–90	TCU	11–16	8–8	T-5th	
1990–91	TCU	5–22	2–14	9th	
1991–92	TCU	4–24	0–14	8th	
1992–93	TCU	10–17	1–13	8th	
TCU:		78–192 (.289)			
Total:		154–255 (.377)			
National champion Postseason invitational champion Conference regular season champion Conference regular season and conference tournament champion Division regular season champion Division regular season and conference tournament champion Conference tournament champion

== USA Basketball ==
Garmon was actively involved, and had multiple roles in the USA basketball organization.

In 1979, she was asked to serve as head coach of the USA entry into the World University Games. The team went on to win the gold medal.

In 1983, the USA basketball organization took the same team that had lost in the recent world championships and entered them in the Pan Am games. While all the players with the same as the previous team, there was one difference — they changed the coaches, choosing Fran Garmon as head coach and Kay Yow as assistant coach. The team would go on to win the gold medal.
