= Breezy Bishop =

American basketball player and coach

Barbara Jude "Breezy" Bishop (born September 7, 1935)) is a former girls' basketball coach at Western Senior High School in Baltimore, Maryland. She built one of the nation's top high school programs during 24 seasons at Western. Bishop was inducted into the Women's Basketball Hall of Fame in 2000.

== Early life ==
She had three brothers who served in the Army, Navy, and Marines. Her grandmother knew that Breezy would make her contribution to sports. In her early teen years, her mother and grandmother were concerned because she always played sports with the boys in her neighborhood. They were so concerned that they sent Breezy to Girl Scout camp. It increased her curiosity in other sports like swimming, hiking, and canoeing.

In high school, she played basketball, softball, and track and field. Breezy wanted to major in physical education in college but she did not have the support from her father so he did not help her out financially. She later dropped out of college after two years.

== Coaching career ==
Towson State University – Tigers

- 1979–80 (15–9)
- 1980–81 (6–18)
- 1981–82 (15–8)
- 1982–83 (15–9)

Started teaching and coaching career in September 1970 at Western High School Western Senior High School – Doves

- 1994–95
- 1993–94
- 1992–93
- 1991–92
- 1990–91
- 1989–90
- 1988–89
- 1987–88
- 1986–87
- 1985–86
- 1984–85
- 1983–84

Record: 411 Wins 39 losses

Coached on a collegiate level

- Johns Hopkins University
- Coppin State University
- Towson University
- North Carolina State University

During her collegiate level, she had a total of 96 wins and 23 losses She had a total of 600 wins and 127 losses in her coaching career

== Coaching awards and recognition ==
- Inaugural Breezy Bishop Classic
- Built one of the nation's top high school programs during 24 seasons at Western Senior High School (Baltimore, Maryland)
- Compiled an overall record of 424–24, winning back-to-back Maryland State Championships in 1994 and 1995 and 17 Baltimore City Championships with her teams consistently ranked among the nation's best by USA
- Was selected as the WBCA National High School Coach of the Year in 1995 as well as a head coach for the WBCA Girls' High School All-America Game.
- Inducted into the Women's Basketball Hall of Fame in 2000.
- Named Coach of the Year in 1984, 1990, 1995 by the Baltimore Suns
- 1995 she was selected by Converse WBCA National Coach of the Year
- In 1995 she was selected to be a part of the United States Olympics Festival games as an assistant coach
- She set up a college fund for students at Western High School in Baltimore, Maryland
