= Arthell Kelly Hall =

Arthell Kelly Hall is a hall which is located on the campus of the University of Southern Mississippi in Hattiesburg, Mississippi. It currently houses the Department of the Administration of Justice.

Originally the Wesley Foundation, the building has seen recent renovations to move the department into the building. The renovations and the subsequent lab design were made possible by a $2 million grant from the Department of Justice. The department used these funds to establish a fully functional forensics lab that competes against many labs in the country while simultaneously being more advanced than Mississippi's own state funded crime lab.
