= Harley Redin =

American basketball coach (1919–2020)

Harley Redin (August 29, 1919 – August 1, 2020) was an American basketball head coach for Wayland Baptist University from 1948 to 1973. With the men's team, Redin had 151 wins and 88 losses during his 1948 to 1956 tenure. With the women's team from 1955 to 1973, Redin had 429 wins and 63 losses and won the Amateur Athletic Union tournament six times. Outside of Wayland Baptist, Redin coached the American women's basketball teams that medalled at the 1959 Pan American Games and 1971 Pan American Games. Redin was inducted into the Women's Basketball Hall of Fame in 1999 and a co-recipient of the 2018 John Bunn Award from the Naismith Memorial Basketball Hall of Fame.

== Early life and education ==
Redin was born on August 29, 1919, in Silverton, Texas. Growing up, Redin played basketball during the 1930s while in high school. For his post-secondary education, Redin continued to play basketball at John Tarleton Agricultural College from 1936 to 1938. He then graduated from a business administration program at North Texas State University in 1942. Years after obtaining his Bachelor of Science, Redin returned to North Texas for a Master of Science in 1948.

== Career ==
In 1943, Redin joined the United States Marine Corps as a member of the VMB-433 during World War II. During the war, Redin served in the Solomon Islands and was promoted to captain. In 1946, Redin began his sports career as a gym teacher and men's basketball coach at Wayland Baptist College. The following year, Redin turned down an offer to coach the women's basketball team at Wayland Baptist.

With Wayland Baptist University, Redin had 151 wins and 88 losses with the men's basketball team from 1948 to 1956. During his tenure, Redin and the men's team reached the first round of the NAIA Men's Basketball Championships in 1954 and 1955. While at Wayland Baptist, Redin coached their women's basketball team from 1955 to 1973. During his 429 wins and 63 losses with the Flying Queens, Redin and the team won the Amateur Athletic Union women's basketball tournament six times.

In world championships, Redin coached the American team that came in fourth at the 1964 FIBA World Championship for Women. In international competitions, Redin was the head coach of the American women's basketball team that won gold at the 1959 Pan American Games and silver at the 1971 Pan American Games. In 1973, Redin stepped down from head coaching to focus on his vice-president position at a bank in Plainview, Texas.

== Awards and honors ==
During 1992, Redin was given the Jostens-Berenson Service Award from the Women's Basketball Coaches Association. As part of the Naismith Awards, Redin received the Naismith Outstanding Contributor to Women’s Basketball Award in 2000. That year, The Amarillo Globe-News selected him as one of their 20th Century's Top 100 Sports Legends of the Texas Panhandle. In 2018, Redin was a co-recipient of the John Bunn Award from the Naismith Memorial Basketball Hall of Fame. For hall of fames, Redin was inducted into the Women's Basketball Hall of Fame in 1999 and the Texas Sports Hall of Fame in 2004.

== Personal life ==
On August 1, 2020, Redin died in Plainview, TX. He was married and had two children.
