= J. Kelley Hall =

Biographical details
- Born: January 13, 1959; DeFuniak Springs, Florida, U.S.
- Died: September 4, 2010 (aged 51); Myrtle Beach, South Carolina, U.S.
- Education: Troy

Coaching career (HC unless noted)
- 1982–1983: Troy State (asst.)
- 1983–1984: Alabama (asst.)
- 1984–1985: Gordon Junior College
- 1985–1992: Truett-McConnell Junior College
- 1992–1994: Mississippi State (asst.)
- 1994–1996: Cal State Fullerton (asst.)
- 1996–2000: Auburn (rec. coordinator)
- 2000–2001: Louisville (asst.)
- 2001–2002: Louisville (assoc. HC)
- 2002–2007: Louisiana–Lafayette
- 2007–2009: Cincinnati

Administrative career (AD unless noted)
- 1985–1992: Truett-McConnell Junior College

J. Kelley Hall (January 13, 1959 – September 4, 2010) was a head women's basketball coach at the University of Cincinnati and the University of Louisiana at Lafayette.

== Coaching career ==
Hall began his coaching career in 1982 as an assistant coach at Troy University. His first head coaching position was at Gordan Junior College in 1984. In 1985, he began a seven-year stint at Truett-McConnell Junior College, amassing a record of 185-49 and winning three state junior college championships. He was named Coach of the Year twice by The Atlanta Journal-Constitution, in 1991 and 1992.

Hall served as head coach of women's basketball at the University of Louisiana at Lafayette from 2002 to 2007. During that time, he was named Sun Belt Conference Coach of the Year, and was the winningest coach in the program's history. He accumulated 86 wins over his 5 seasons there. In 2006, he guided Louisiana-Lafayette to a 25–9 record, and a Sun Belt Conference regular season championship.

Hall began coaching the women's basketball team at Cincinnati in 2007. His team finished 12–16 that season, but due to a lack of players, he was tasked with managing a short rotation of only 7 players. He was fired from the position after a second losing season.

== Death ==
Hall died of a heart attack in his South Carolina home on September 4, 2010. He was 51 years old.
