= Olga Sukharnova =

Russian basketball player

Personal information
- Born: 14 February 1955 (age 71) Perekhodinskoye, Krasnodar Kray, USSR
- Listed height: 192 cm (6 ft 4 in)
- Listed weight: 94 kg (207 lb)
- Women's Basketball Hall of Fame
Medals
Women's basketball
Representing the Soviet Union
Olympic Games
Gold medal – first place	1976 Montreal	Team competition
Gold medal – first place	1980 Moscow	Team competition
European Championships
Gold medal – first place	1975 Colombia	Team competition
Gold medal – first place	1983 Brazil	Team competition
European Championships
Gold medal – first place	1972 Bulgaria	Team competition
Gold medal – first place	1974 Italy	Team competition
Gold medal – first place	1976 France	Team competition
Gold medal – first place	1978 Poland	Team competition
Gold medal – first place	1980 Yugoslavia	Team competition
Gold medal – first place	1981 Italy	Team competition
Gold medal – first place	1983 Hungary	Team competition
Gold medal – first place	1985 Italy	Team competition
Gold medal – first place	1987 Spain	Team competition

Olga Leonidovna Sukharnova (Russian: Ольга Леонидовна Сухарнова; born 14 February 1955, in Perekhodinskoye, Krasnodar Kray) is a retired female basketball player, who twice won the gold medal with the Soviet national team at the Summer Olympics; 1976 and 1980.

1. Participation in the Final Four of the Champions League 1993 in Valencia
2. Champion USSR in 1978
3. runner up USSR in 1976, 1979, 1980, 1981, 1982
4. finished USSR third in 1975 and 1977
5. Champion France 1989, 1990 with Mirande
6. Champion France 1991, 1992, 1993 with Challes
7. Tournament of the Federation 1991, 1993
- won gold medals at 2 World Championships 1975 and 1983
- won gold medals at 9 EuroBaskets 1972, 1974, 1976, 1978, 1980, 1981, 1983, 1985, 1987
- Europe Junior Championship Gold Medals in 1971 and 1973
- World University Games Gold medals at the 1973, 1977, and 1981 games

After her career in the USSR, she joined the championship in France, obtaining 5 consecutive titles, first with Mirande then Challes-les-Eaux.

she played for

1. Spartak Moscow Region
2. France BAC Mirande
3. France Challes-les-Eaux Basket

Sukharnova was inducted into the Women's Basketball Hall of Fame in 2000.
