= Mighty Mac =

Mighty Mac or Mighty Macs may refer to:

- Mackinac Bridge, a suspension bridge in Michigan known as the Mighty Mac
- Mighty Mac, nickname of the USS McKean (DD-784), a destroyer
- Mighty Mac, nickname of the USS McClusky (FFG-41), a frigate
- Mighty Mac, nickname of the USS Mackinac (AVP-13), a seaplane tender
- The Mighty Mac, winning horse in the 1981 Powers Gold Cup and 1984 Cathcart Challenge Cup
- Mighty Macs, nickname of the sports teams of Immaculata University, formerly Immaculata College
  - The Mighty Macs, a 2009 film about the women's basketball team of what was then Immaculata College
- Mighty Mac, nickname of the sports teams of Bishop McNamara High School, Forestville, Maryland
- Mighty Macs, nickname of the sports teams of Mother McAuley Liberal Arts High School, Chicago, Illinois
