= Mildred Barnes =

American basketball coach and executive

Mildred Barnes is an American basketball coach and executive. She was a member of the U.S. Olympic Women's Basketball Committee from 1965 through 1972 and served as the chair of that committee from 1974 to 1976. Barnes was inducted into the Women's Basketball Hall of Fame in 2000.

== College ==
Barnes attended Boston University, where she earned both an undergraduate degree from Boston University's Sargent College as well as a doctoral degree from Boston University's School of Education.

While at Boston University, she competed in multiple sports:

- Volleyball
- Basketball
- Fist ball
- Field hockey
- Lacrosse
- Softball
- Soccer
- Tennis
- Badminton

== Coaching ==
A 1951 graduate of Sargent College, Millie started her teaching career at Winchester High School in Winchester, MA where she coached field hockey, basketball and softball. While in the Massachusetts area, she was active in MAHPERD, chairing the DGWS Committee as well as the softball and basketball committees. From 1952 through 1955, she served on the executive committee of the USFHA. An active official, Millie held national ratings in basketball, lacrosse, softball, volleyball, and field hockey.

Barnes served as the head coach for the Iowa from 1966 to 1969. The Iowa team was part of the first postseason intercollegiate invitational tournament in 1969, where they placed fourth. Barnes then went on to coach Central Missouri from 1971 to 1980.

She was the head coach of the team representing the US in the inaugural Jones Cup Tournament in 1977.

=== Head coaching record ===
Statistics overview
Season	Team	Overall	Conference	Standing	Postseason
Central Missouri (Mid-America Intercollegiate Athletics Association) (1971–1980)
1971–72	Central Missouri	16–3			
1972–73	Central Missouri	17–6			
1973–74	Central Missouri	13–7			
1974–75	Central Missouri	13–8			
1975–76	Central Missouri	15–8			
1976–77	Central Missouri	23–6			
1977–78	Central Missouri	17–10			
1978–79	Central Missouri	16–10			
1979–80	Central Missouri	26–5			AIAW Opening Round
Mildred Barnes:		156–63 (.712)			
Total:		(156–63 (.712))			
National champion Postseason invitational champion Conference regular season champion Conference regular season and conference tournament champion Division regular season champion Division regular season and conference tournament champion Conference tournament champion

== Executive ==
Barnes was active in the Division for Girls' and Women's Sports (DGWS), which was part of the American Association for Health, Physical Education and Recreation. That organization oversaw the development of women's basketball in the middle of the 20th century. (That organization formed the Commission on Intercollegiate Athletics for Women (CIAW), which led to the AIAW, a predecessor organization of the NCAA). She served on a number of committees and was the principal editor of the DGWS Basketball Guide in 1965–66.

Barnes played a key role in the beginning of the entry of women's basketball into the Olympics. She served on the US Olympic women's basketball committee from 1965 to 1972, then became chair of the committee, which oversaw the inaugural competition in 1976.

== Author ==
Barnes is the author of several publication, including books in basketball and field hockey. She authored a chapter in the book by Joan S. Hult A Century of women's basketball : from frailty to final four In which she trace the evolution of the women's game from the 1920s to the 40s. That period started with a game using a court with three sections. Players were either guards centers of forwards and restricted to staying in their own section. The game transitioned to a two section court, and the addition of rovers who were able to go the length of the court, although other players still had to remain in their half of the court and only a single dribble before pass or shot was allowed. The game remained six players for many years, but slowing switched over to a five player game

== Awards and honors ==
- 1977–1986—Board of Trustees of the Naismith Basketball Hall of Fame
- 1978—Boston University Hall of Fame
- 2000—Women's Basketball Hall of Fame
- 2005—United States Lacrosse Hall of Fame
- 2011—Missouri Sports Hall of Fame
- Boston University established the Mildred Barnes Award in her name, "presented to the Boston University student who is chosen the top female athlete of the year, regardless of class."
- Central Missouri established a scholarship in her name: "for a student pursuing a degree in physical education and competed as a student athlete or is currently holding a graduate assistant coaching position for Jennies Athletics"

== Publications ==
- Barnes, Mildred J. (1972). Women's basketball. Allyn and Bacon. ISBN 978-0205066049.
- Barnes, Mildred J. (1976). Women's basketball. Allyn and Bacon. ISBN 978-0205034505.
- Barnes, Mildred J.; Kentwell, Richard G. R. (1972). Field Hockey: The Coach and the Player. Allyn and Bacon. ISBN 978-0205065127
- Barnes, Mildred J. (1965). Girls' basketball. Sterling Pub. Co. ISBN 978-0806943084.
- Barnes, Mildred J. (1969). Girls' basketball (Athletic Institute). Oak Tree Press. ISBN 978-0706121629.
