= All-American Red Heads =

American women's professional exhibition basketball team (1936–1986)

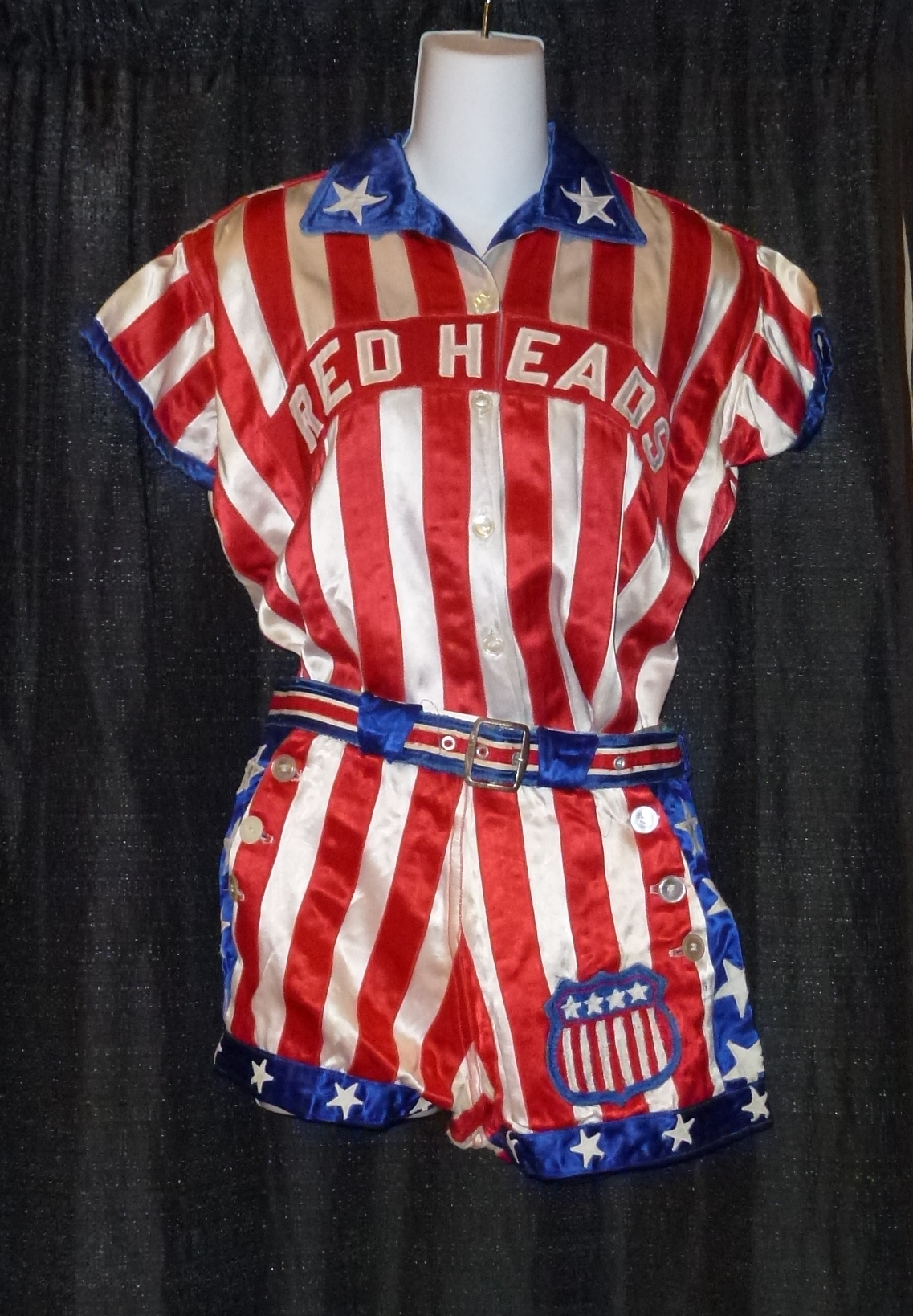
All American Red Heads uniform

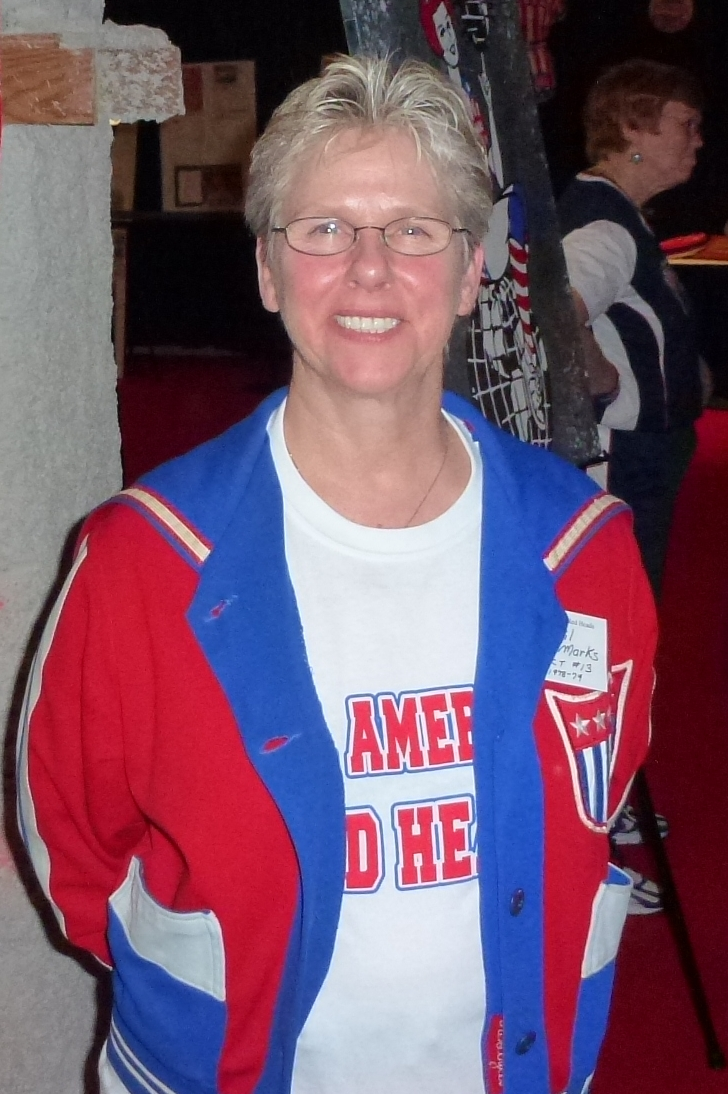
Gail Marks

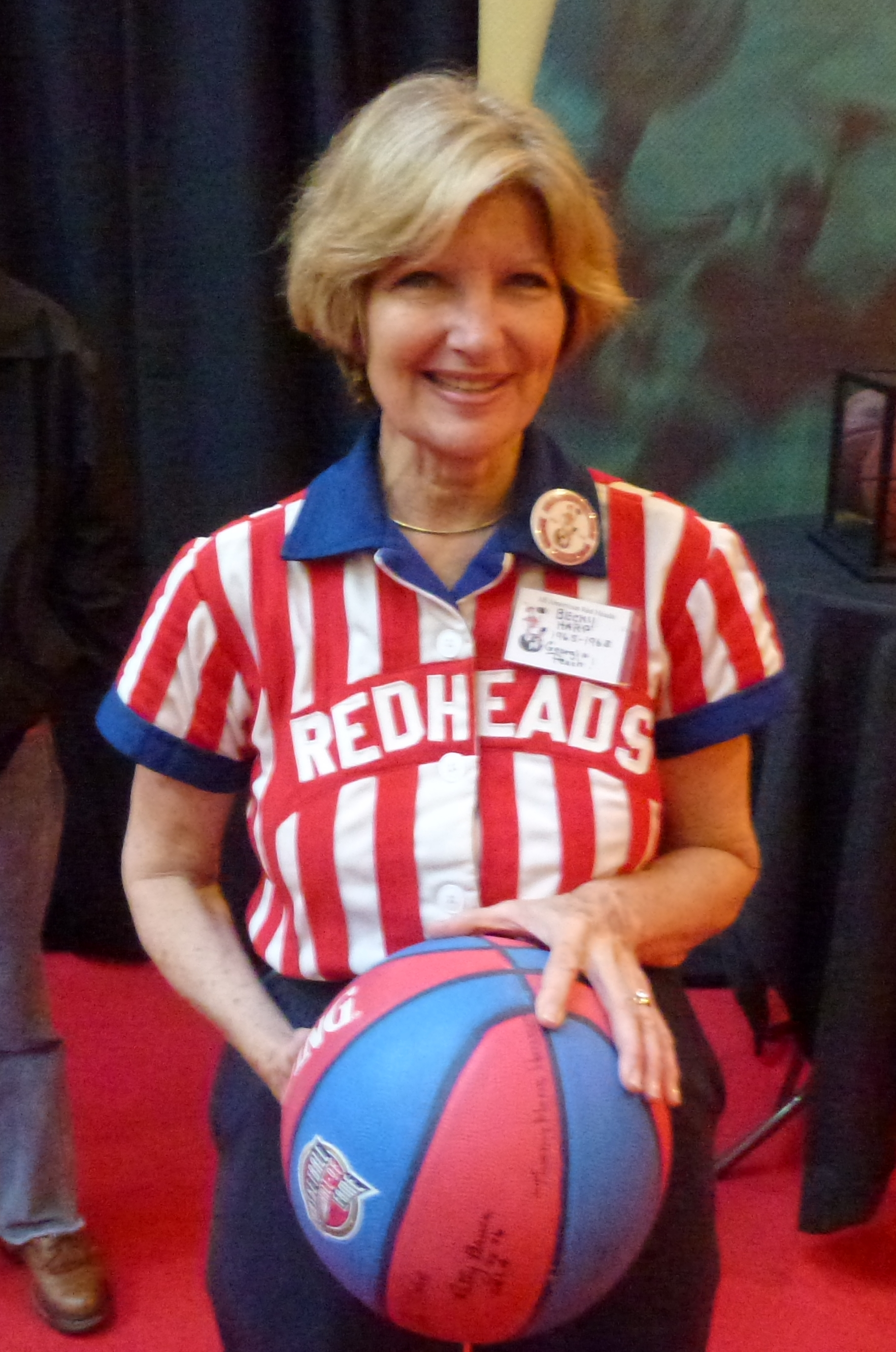
Becky Harp Pritchett

The All American Red Heads were the first professional women's basketball team. In 1936, almost 50 years after women's basketball began, C. M. "Ole" Olson (who also founded Olson's Terrible Swedes) started a barnstorming team which would play around the country until 1986. The name of the team came from Olson's wife, who owned a number of beauty salons in the south. They played by men's rules and were a smash success with the audience. They were so successful as an exhibition team that they fostered two other teams, the Ozark Hillbillies and the Famous Red Heads.

Two of the early players for the team were Geneva (Jean) and Jo Langerman. Jean and Jo were the twin daughters of "Mama" Langerman, an unmarried beautician who moved from town to town. The twins led three teams to the Iowa state tournament, finishing third in 1931 at Whittemore, Iowa, and winning the state championships while at Parkersburg, and Hampton, Iowa in 1932, and 1933. Following their high school career, they played for an AAU team, winning the national championship in 1934, then joined the All American Red Heads. As a result of their accomplishments, they were inducted into the Iowa Girls High School Athletic Union Basketball Hall of Fame.

Orwell Moore, a high school coach, coached two of the teams from 1948 and then purchased them. The teams boasted AAU All-American players and stars like Peggy Lawson, Kay Kirkpatrick, and Hazel Walker. Other stars included Willa “Red” Mason, Johnny Farley, Barb Hostert, Jolene Ammons and Cheryl Clark. Orwell Moore's wife, Lorene “Butch” Moore, was also a spectacular Red Heads player. Through the 1960s and 1970s, three teams toured. During the off-season, players taught basketball to girls. Orwell also began Camp Courage, a basketball camp for girls. Charlotte Adams, Glenda Hall, Kay O'Bryan, and Jolene Ammons became player coaches. Seasons ran from October to late April or early May and consisted of approximately 200 games, traveling over 60,000 miles (97,000 km) miles by car.

== Sources ==
- Barnstorming America, Stories from the Pioneers of Women's Basketball
- Moore, Orwell; Moore Harrison, Tammy; Rankin, Howard (2017). Breaking The Press: The Incredible Story of The All American Red Heads. Tammy Harrison. ISBN 978-0692798263.

== Awards and honors ==
In February 2010, the team was honored at part of National Girls and Women in Sports Day in Minnesota.

In July 2010, the All American Red Heads were honored at the Senior Pan-American games in Eugene, Oregon. They also had a reunion there. It was at this tournament that players laced up their sneakers one more time and played alumni from the NBA Portland Trail Blazers.

The team was honored by the Women's Basketball Hall of Fame for their contributions to the game. The team was recognized in a display entitled "Trailblazers of the Game" at the 2011 Induction Ceremony on June 11, 2011.

On April 2, 2012, the team was announced as a member of the Naismith Memorial Basketball Hall of Fame induction class of 2012. The Red Heads were formally enshrined on September 7.

In 2017, the team was inducted into the Missouri Sports Hall of Fame.

In 2020, the team will be inducted into the Arkansas Sports Hall of Fame.

== See also ==
- Timeline of women's basketball history
