= Lometa Odom =

American basketball player and coach (1933–2017)

- Odom in 2011

Personal information
- Born: November 29, 1933 Washington, Oklahoma, U.S.
- Died: January 27, 2017 (aged 83) Amarillo, Texas, U.S.
- Listed height: 5 ft 10 in (1.78 m)
- Listed weight: 210 lb (95 kg)

Career information
- High school: Dimmitt (Dimmitt, Texas)
- College: Wayland Baptist
- Position: Forward
- Number: 20

Career highlights
- 3× AAU All-American (1953–1956); AAU Tournament MVP (1956); 3× Texas All-State (1950–1952)

Career AAU statistics
- Points: 1,614
- Women's Basketball Hall of Fame
Medals
Women's basketball
Representing the United States
Pan American
Gold medal – first place	1955 Mexico City	Team competition

Lometa Ruth Odom (November 29, 1933 – January 27, 2017) was an American women's basketball player and coach. Odom played for Wayland Baptist from 1953 to 1956 during which the team began a streak of 131 consecutive victories (the longest streak in college and professional sports team history). Odom was a member of the U.S. women's national team which won the gold medal in basketball at the 1955 Pan American Games. In 2011 she was inducted into the Women's Basketball Hall of Fame.

== Biography ==
Odom was born November 29, 1933, in Washington, Oklahoma; her parents were David Hiram Odom (a farmer) and Opal Lee Odom (née Millican).

The family moved to Dimmitt, Texas, in 1948. At Dimmitt High School she played four seasons of basketball, scoring 4,022 points and averaging 41 points per game. In 1951 she set the Texas single-game scoring record of 78 points. She led her high school team to state titles three times (1950–1952) and was selected for Texas All-State honors each of those seasons. Odom helped lead the Dimmitt team to victory over the Iowa state champions twice, beating Slater High 47–20 in 1950 and Hansell High 39–30 in 1951.

=== AAU ===
Odom went on to play for the Wayland Baptist team in Plainview, Texas from 1952 through 1956. At the time the school played against women's Amateur Athletic Union (AAU) teams, most of which were run as semi-professional teams and were sponsored by businesses. Wayland convinced local businessman Claude Hutcherson, who ran a passenger and cargo air service in town, to fly the team to its away games. The team was renamed "Hutcherson Flying Queens" and became one of the most successful AAU women's teams.

During her time at Wayland the team went 115–5, and began a series of 131 consecutive wins which ended in 1958. This 131-game run remains the longest winning streak in college and professional basketball history. Odom was the team's top offensive player all four years, and she was the first Wayland player to become a four-time All-American. The team won three AAU titles while she was at Wayland, and she was the 1956 AAU Tournament MVP. Two of her years Wayland went undefeated (1953–1954 and 1954–1955). While she played, Wayland teams set several school records which still stand including season wins (37 in 1952–1953), consecutive wins (131 from 1953 to 1958), and best defensive average (29.4 points per game in 1954–1955).

Former Wayland coach Harley Redin said of Odom, "She was such a great post player. Her fundamentals were just perfect. She was just exceptional at faking and getting good, accurate shots." Redin imposed some rules on his team, including that the players could not be married. (He thought it was unacceptable for women to travel without their husbands on road games). When Lometa's boyfriend in Dimmitt, Eloy Powell, proposed to her, she told him they had to wait. Just a few weeks later, Powell was killed by a train returning home from a visit to the campus. In 2013 Odom said, "I thought I’d never get over it, losing him. Some days I just wanted to go back to the farm. But I stayed. I knew I couldn’t let the Flying Queens or my daddy down."

Odom was chosen for the women's basketball team to represent the U.S. at the Second Pan American Games in March 1955 in Mexico City. The U.S. team went 8–0 and captured the gold medal.

=== Later life ===
After retiring as a player, Odom coached high school basketball and taught school for 37 years at schools including Gruver High School, Spearman High School, White Deer High School, Coronado Junior High and Plainview High School before retiring in 1994. She was a member of the PTA, the National Science Teachers Association and the Texas High School Coaches Association.

Odom moved to Canyon, Texas in 2003 and then to Amarillo in 2010. She died January 27, 2017, in Amarillo and is buried at Westlawn Memorial Park in Dimmitt.

=== Honors ===
Odom was named to the Helms Athletic Foundation Hall of Fame in 1968. She was the first woman inducted into the Texas High School Basketball Hall of Fame and the Texas Panhandle Sports Hall of Fame. Odom was inducted into the Women's Basketball Hall of Fame in 2011. The Hall of Fame inducted the Flying Queens in 2013 for their role in basketball history and the 131-game winning streak, naming the team "Trailblazers of the Game" and recognizing Odom and the players from that era.
