= Betty Jaynes (basketball) =

American basketball coach (1945–2014)

Betty Faith Jaynes (September 1, 1945 – February 10, 2014) was an American basketball coach. She played basketball in high school in Georgia, and coached basketball at James Madison University. She was the first executive director of the Women's Basketball Coaches Association and is inducted into several sports halls of fame. Jaynes was inducted into the Women's Basketball Hall of Fame in 2000.

== Early years and education ==
Born in Covington, Georgia, Jaynes attended Newton County High School and lettered in basketball for four years. Jaynes played as a stationary guard, which dates to the existence of six-on-six basketball. She earned all-state player honors in her junior and senior years. As a senior, she helped her team to a 33–1 record and a place in the Class AA state championship game in 1963. Jaynes earned her Bachelor of Science degree in physical education in 1967 from the Women's College of Georgia, now known as Georgia College & State University, in the school's last graduating class before it became coeducational that fall. She went on to earn a Master of Science in the same field from the University of North Carolina at Greensboro in 1968.

== College coaching career ==
Jaynes became the head coach of the women's basketball team at Madison College (now James Madison University) in 1970. She continued in that position until 1982, with her teams amassing a record of 142–114.

== Formation of the Women's Basketball Coaches Association ==
1981 was a key year in the history of women's basketball. The AIAW had been conducting post-season tournaments for years, but the NCAA decided to offer a women's basketball tournament starting in 1982. While some coaches preferred the AIAW and some preferred the NCAA, there was no organization of coaches to express the position of the coaching community on this or any other issue. While there was an existing organization of basketball coaches, the NABC, it was an association of men's team coaches, and the organization was not prepared to expand their remit to women's team coaches. With no other suitable alternatives, some of the leading coaches met in 1981 to consider forming an association. Later in the year, a formal organizational meeting convened, and Betty Jaynes was selected as the interim executive director. The organization quickly dropped the "interim" modifier, and Jaynes would go on to serve as Executive Director for 15 years, then "retire" and continue as a consultant.

== Death ==
She died at age 68 at a hospice in Athens, Georgia, following a brief illness.

== Awards and honors ==
- 2000: Inducted into Women's Basketball Hall of Fame
- 2007: Inducted into Georgia Sports Hall of Fame
- 2008: Inducted into Virginia Sports Hall of Fame
