= Susan Rojcewicz =

American basketball player

Personal information
- Born: May 29, 1953 (age 73) Worcester, Massachusetts, U.S.
- Listed height: 5 ft 5 in (1.65 m)
- Women's Basketball Hall of Fame
Medals
Women's basketball
Representing the United States
Olympic Games
Silver medal – second place	1976 Montreal	Team competition
Pan American Games
Gold medal – first place	1975 Mexico City	Team competition

Susan Marie Rojcewicz (born May 29, 1953) is an American former basketball player who competed in the 1976 Summer Olympics. She was born in Worcester, Massachusetts. After culminating her college career at Southern Connecticut State University in 1975, Rojcewicz became a physical education instructor and assistant basketball coach at Penn State University. Rojcewicz was inducted into the Women's Basketball Hall of Fame in 2000. On June 26, 2025, she was inducted into the National Polish-American Sports Hall of Fame located in Troy, Michigan; Class of 2025.

She also coached the San Francisco Dons women's basketball team.

== USA Basketball ==
In 1975, Rojcewicz was selected to represent the United States' national team in the FIBA World Championship for Women in Colombia and the Pan American Games in Mexico City, Mexico. She teamed up with high school star Nancy Lieberman and fellow college stars Ann Meyers and Pat Head. In the FIBA World Championship, the United States compiled a 4–3 record and finished in eighth place. Rojcewicz averaged 7.7 points per game. In the Pan American Games, the United States team went unbeaten in seven games to win the gold medal, their first win since 1963.

Rojcewicz was named to the USA Basketball National Team to represent the US at the 1976 Olympics, the first year that women's basketball would be played at the Olympics. The USA team ended with a record of 3–2, losing to the eventual gold medal champion USSR in the semifinal game, and winning the final game against Czechoslovakia to take home the silver medal. Rojcewicz averaged 7.2 points per game.

== See also ==
- List of Pennsylvania State University Olympians
