= Hazel Walker =

American basketball player

Personal information
- Born: August 8, 1914 Ashdown, Arkansas, U.S.
- Died: December 18, 1990 (aged 76) Ashdown, Arkansas, U.S.
- Listed height: 5 ft 9 in (1.75 m)

Career information
- High school: Ashdown (Ashdown, Arkansas)
- College: Tulsa Business College
- Position: Forward
- Women's Basketball Hall of Fame

Hazel Leona Walker (August 8, 1914 – December 18, 1990) was an American amateur basketball player in the 1930s and 1940s. She is recognized as one of the greatest amateur basketball players of the era. Walker led her college team to the 1934 AAU National Championship, and earned All-American honors. She played professionally for the All American Red Heads, then left that organization to start her own barnstorming professional basketball team, the Arkansas Travelers. This team played for sixteen seasons against men's teams winning over 80% of their games. Walker was inducted into the Women's Basketball Hall of Fame in 2001.

== High school ==
Walker was born August 8, 1914, to Herbert and Minnie (Chauncy) Walker in the town of Ashdown AR. She attended Ashdown High School where she played forward. At that time, the game rules divided the court into three sections, and players could not leave their section. She was a four-year starter on her high school team, and reached the height of 5'9" by the time she was a senior At that time, Arkansas schools did not hold a state tournament for high school teams, but the AAU teams did. Although her AAU team lost in the finals, partly because several of her teammates were recovering from measles, she was elected All-State.

== College ==
Walker won a scholarship to play at Tulsa Business College, a two-year school, whose team name was the Stenos. Her scholarship covered tuition, but Walker needed to work at a soda fountain to scrape by. In her first year, the Stenos were eliminated from the national tournament, but in 1934, they went on to win the National AAU Tournament. The Stenos would win the title game 32-22, beating the Oklahoma City University Cardinals. The Cardinals were coached by Sam F. Babb, who had coached the Oklahoma Presbyterian College Cardinals to the national AAU title in the previous two years, 1932, and 1933. While Walker would leave the Stenos after completing her two years in 1934, the team would go on to win the national championship in 1935, and 1936, ironically against the El Dorado Lion Oil team led by Hazel Walker in 1936.

== Post-college ==
Walker joined the El Dorado, Arkansas Lion Oil AAU team that finished third in the national tournament in 1935, and second in 1936. Her former team, the Tulsa Business College Stenos, won the national championship each time, beating Walker's team in 1936 by a single point. While at Lion Oil, she married Everett Eugene Crutcher, but she tried to keep the marriage a secret, because the team did not allow married women on the team. Her marriage was discovered, but the company chairman, Col TH Barton, made an exception to the rule so that she could keep playing for the team. Crutcher, a train brakeman, died in 1940 in a railroad accident. When El Dorado Oilers disbanded in 1936, Walker and several teammates joined the Lewis and Norwood Flyers. The Flyers went on to win the AAU National Championship in 1937, 1940 and 1941. In 1942, Walker's Little Rock Flyer's would come in second in the national tournament, but she would win the tournament MVP honors.

Walker was awarded first or second team All-American honors in eleven of her 14 years in AAU competition. In this era, the AAU also held free throw competitions. Walker won the national event six times; in 1940 she hit 49 of 50 free throw attempts. She also won the international free throw competition twice.

== Professional career ==
In 1946, Walker joined Olson's All American Red Heads. The team name came from the red hair of the players, natural in the case of some players such as the Langerman twins, dyed in the case of others, or wigs, as in the case of Hazel Walker. In 1947, the team was traveling 30,000 miles a year, playing 180 games in 38 states. Walker spent three years with the team, but in 1949 decided to form her own team, Hazel Walker's Arkansas Travelers, becoming the first woman to own a professional basketball team. The team averaged 220 games a season, winning over 80% of their games (September to May) from 1949-1965. They played only men's teams under men's rules, traveling from town to town in a nine-passenger DeSoto Suburban.

== Awards and honors ==
- AP Top Female Athlete (1940)
- Helms Athletic Hall of Fame (1954)
- Helms Basketball Hall of Fame (1967)
- Arkansas Sports Hall of Fame (1959)
- Women's Basketball Hall of Fame (2001)
- The 50 Greatest Sports Figures: Arkansas
- Best Woman Athlete by Birth State:Arkansas
