= Nancy Dunkle =

American basketball player

Nancy Lynn Dunkle
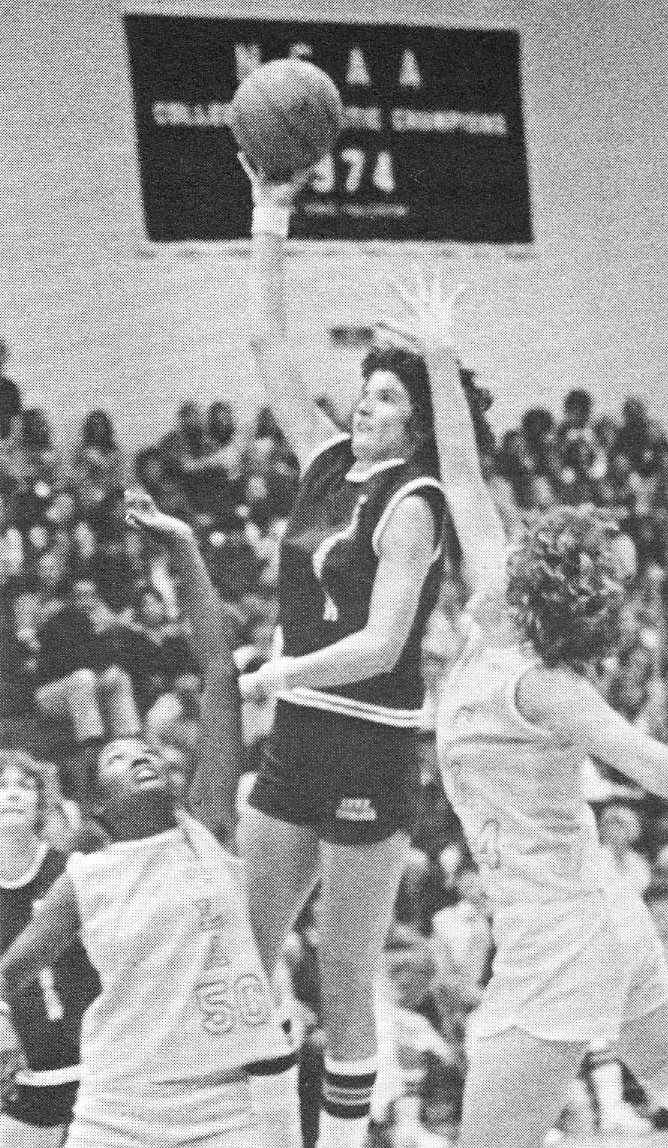

Personal information
- Born: January 10, 1955 (age 71)
- Listed height: 6 ft 2 in (1.88 m)

Career information
- College: Cal State Fullerton (1973–1977)
- Position: Forward / Center

Career history

Playing
- 1979–1980: California Dreams
- 1980: San Francisco Pioneers
- 1980–1981: Minnesota Fillies
- 1981: San Francisco Pioneers

Coaching
- 1977–1979: Cal State Fullerton
- 1980: California Dreams

Career highlights
- As player: WBL All-Star (1980); 2× All-American (1975, 1976); 3x Kodak All-American (1975–1977)

Career WBL playing statistics
- Points: 756 (12.6 ppg)
- Games: 60
- Stats at Basketball Reference

Career coaching record
- WBL: 5–3 (.625)
- Women's Basketball Hall of Fame
Medals
Olympic Games
Women's basketball
Representing the United States
Silver medal – second place	1976 Montreal	Team competition
World University Games
Silver medal – second place	1973 Moscow	Team competition
Pan American
Gold medal – first place	1975 Mexico City	Team Competition

Nancy Lynn Dunkle (born January 10, 1955) is an American former basketball player who competed in the 1976 Summer Olympics. She played college basketball for Cal State Fullerton before going on to play professionally in the Women's Professional Basketball League, the first women's pro basketball league in the United States. Dunkle was inducted into the Women's Basketball Hall of Fame in 2000.

== USA Basketball ==
The 6'2" tall Dunkle was named to the team representing the US at the 1973 World University Games competition in Moscow, Soviet Union. It was the eighth such competition, but the first one in which the USA competed in women's basketball. The USA team had to play the Soviet Union in the opening round, and lost to the hosts, 92–43. The USA team bounced back and won their next two games. After preliminary play, the teams moved into medal rounds, where the first round loss carried over. In the medal round, the USA won their next three games, including a match against 6–0 Cuba, which the USA won 59–44. That sent them to the gold medal game, but against the host Soviet Union, now 7–0. The USSR won to capture the gold medal, while the USA finished with a silver in their first competition.

In 1975 Dunkle played for the USA team in the Pan American Games held in Mexico City, Mexico. The USA team had finished second in 1967 and 1971, but won all seven games at the 1975 event to capture their first gold medal since 1963.

Dunkle earned a spot on the USA National team, which competed in the 1975 World Championships held in Cali, Colombia. The USA team lost their opening round game by two points to Japan 73–71. After winning the next game, they faced Czechoslovakia who won by a single point 66–65. This sent the USA team to the consolation rounds, where they won three of four, but dropped a game to Canada 74–68. The USA finished the competition in eighth place.

Dunkle continued with the National team to the 1976 Olympics, held in Montreal, Quebec, Canada. After losing the opening game to Japan, the USA team beat Bulgaria, but then faced host team Canada. Dunkle was the leading scorer for the USA team with 17 points, helping the USA team defeat Canada 84–71. After losing to the USSR, the USA team needed a victory against Czechoslovakia to secure a medal. Dunkle scored 14 points, to help the team to an 83–67 win and the silver medal.

== Cal State Fullerton statistics ==
Legend
GP	Games played	GS	Games started	MPG	Minutes per game
FG%	Field goal percentage	3P%	3-point field goal percentage	FT%	Free throw percentage
RPG	Rebounds per game	APG	Assists per game	SPG	Steals per game
BPG	Blocks per game	PPG	Points per game	**Bold**	Career high

Year	Team	GP	Points	FG%	FT%	RPG	APG	PPG
1974	Cal State Fullerton	**21**	322	NA	NA	7.4	NA	15.3
1975	Cal State Fullerton	**21**	376	NA	NA	8.6	NA	17.9
1976	Cal State Fullerton	19	423	56.0%	51.8%	**13.1**	2.3	**22.3**
1977	Cal State Fullerton	**21**	**438**	56.8%	**70.4%**	8.0	**2.4**	20.9
Career		82	1559	52.5%	NA	9.2	NA	19.0
