= List of members of the Naismith Memorial Basketball Hall of Fame =

The Naismith Memorial Basketball Hall of Fame, located in Springfield, Massachusetts, honors players who have shown exceptional skill at basketball, all-time great coaches, referees, and other major contributors to the sport. It is named after James Naismith, who conceived the sport in 1891; he was inducted into the Hall as a contributor in 1959. To be considered for induction, nominees must meet certain prerequisites. Players must have been retired for at least three years before becoming eligible. Referees must have either been retired for at least three years, or, if they are still active, have officiated for at least 25 years at high-school-level programs or higher. Coaches must have either been retired for at least three years, or, if they are still active, have coached for at least 25 years at high-school-level programs or higher and from 2020 on must have coached for at least 25 years and reached the age of sixty years. Those being considered for induction as contributors may be inducted at any time; the Hall of Fame and its committees evaluate whether contributions are significant enough for the nominee to be inducted as a contributor. Teams are also inducted at the committees' discretion.

== Members ==
=== Coaches ===
As part of the inaugural class of 1959, three coaches were inducted (Forrest C. "Phog" Allen, Henry Clifford Carlson and Walter E. Meanwell); in total, 100 coaches have been inducted into the Hall of Fame. Ten of the inducted coaches were born outside the United States: Cesare Rubini (Italy, 1994), Alexander Gomelsky (Soviet Union, now Russia, 1995), Antonio Díaz-Miguel (Spain, 1997), Aleksandar "Aca" Nikolić (Yugoslavia, now Serbia, 1998), Geno Auriemma (Italy, 2006), Alessandro "Sandro" Gamba (Italy, 2006), Mirko Novosel (Yugoslavia, now Croatia, 2007), Pedro Ferrándiz (Spain, 2007), Lidia Alexeeva (Soviet Union, now Russia, 2012), and Lindsay Gaze (Australia, 2015). Six of them have won championships in the EuroLeague or its historic predecessor, the FIBA European Champions Cup. Ten of the inducted coaches are women: L. Margaret Wade (1985), Jody Conradt (1998), Pat Head Summitt (2000), Sandra Kay Yow (2002), Sue Gunter (2005), Cathy Rush (2008), C. Vivian Stringer (2009), Tara VanDerveer (2011), Alexeeva (2012), and Sylvia Hatchell (2013). Five coaches have also been inducted as players: John Wooden, Bill Sharman, Lenny Wilkens, Tom Heinsohn, and Bill Russell. The most recent coaches to be inducted are Tom Izzo and John McLendon; the latter, inducted as a contributor in 1979, is the first individual to be inducted separately as a coach and contributor.

Most of the inductees have been college head coaches. Thirty-two have led a team to the National Collegiate Athletic Association (NCAA) men's championship and six have led a team to the NCAA women's championship. Twenty inductees have coached in the National Basketball Association (NBA). Twelve of them have won at least one NBA championship as head coaches; one other, Don Nelson, has five NBA championships as a player. Additionally, Bobby "Slick" Leonard won three titles in the former American Basketball Association. Larry Brown is the only inductee to coach both a college basketball team and a professional basketball team to a title, having coached the Kansas Jayhawks (NCAA) and the Detroit Pistons (NBA) to championships.

Six coaching inductees have received the Hall's John Bunn Award, given annually for significant contributions to the sport—Red Auerbach, Henry Iba, Ray Meyer, Summitt, Wooden, and Morgan Wootten.

Twelve inductees have, either before or after their induction, won an Olympic medal coaching a men's national team to a top-three finish in the Olympic tournament. Eight coached the U.S. national team, while the other four coached foreign national teams. Six inductees—Summitt, Yow, Auriemma, Van Chancellor, VanDerveer, and Alexeeva—have led a women's national team to a top-three finish in the Olympics. Alexeeva led the Soviet Union to two golds, while all the others led the United States to gold medals (Auriemma after his induction, the others before being inducted). The United States and the Soviet Union (including the Unified Team in 1992) are the only two teams to have won the Olympic basketball tournament: the U.S. in 1984, 1988, 1996–2020, and the USSR in 1976, 1980 and 1992.

Six individuals inducted as coaches were associated with teams that have been inducted to the Hall as units. Donald L. "Don" Haskins, inducted in 1997, was the head coach of the 1966 Texas Western basketball team, which was inducted into the Hall in 2007. Chuck Daly, inducted in 1994, was the head coach of the "Dream Team", the USA team at the 1992 Olympics that featured 11 Hall of Fame players and was inducted as a unit in 2010. Wilkens, inducted as a coach in 1998, and Mike Krzyzewski, inducted in 2001, were Daly's assistants in 1992. Dutch Lonborg, inducted in 1973, was team manager for the 1960 U.S. men's Olympic team that was also inducted as a unit in 2010. Cathy Rush, inducted in 2008, was the head coach of the Immaculata College women's team of 1972–1974 that was inducted in 2014.

=== Contributors ===
For a person to be inducted to the Basketball Hall of Fame as a contributor, they must have made "significant contributions to the game of basketball". Of the inaugural Hall of Fame class of 1959, seven individuals were inducted as contributors, including James Naismith, the inventor of basketball. All former NBA commissioners (Maurice Podoloff, J. Walter Kennedy, Larry O'Brien, and David Stern) have been inducted. Seventeen individuals inducted as contributors have won the John Bunn Award, awarded by the Hall annually to a significant contributor: John Bunn (its inaugural recipient), J. Walter Kennedy, Cliff Fagan, Edward Gottlieb, Danny Biasone, Larry O'Brien, Dave Gavitt, C. M. Newton, Tex Winter, Meadowlark Lemon, Tom Jernstedt, Tom "Satch" Sanders, Val Ackerman, George Raveling, Al Attles, Rod Thorn and Del Harris. Four inductees in this category are women: Senda Berenson Abbott and Bertha Teague (both inducted in 1985), Rebecca Lobo (2017) and Val Ackerman (2021).

The exact number of individuals enshrined as contributors (as well as the number of player inductees) is subject to debate because of the Hall's treatment of 2014 inductee Nathaniel "Sweetwater" Clifton, one of the first African Americans to play in the NBA. While he was initially announced as a contributor, the Hall now classifies him as a player inductee.

Six inductees in this category were associated with teams that have been inducted to the Hall as units. Naismith organized The First Team, the group of players involved in the first-ever basketball game in 1891 and also inducted as part of the inaugural Class of 1959. Robert L. Douglas, inducted in 1972, was the founder and owner of the New York Renaissance, inducted in 1963. Pete Newell, inducted in 1979, was the head coach of the 1960 U.S. Olympic team inducted in 2010. Three were associated with the Harlem Globetrotters, inducted in 2002. Abe Saperstein, inducted in 1971, was the team's founder and owner. Kennedy, although best known for his time as NBA commissioner, had been the Globetrotters' public relations director in the 1950s. Lemon, inducted in 2003, was one of the team's most enduring on-court stars.

Ten individuals inducted in this category were born outside the United States—Naismith and Newell in Canada, Podoloff and Gottlieb in modern-day Ukraine (part of the Russian Empire when they were born in 1890 and 1898 respectively), Douglas in Saint Kitts and Nevis (part of the British West Indies at his birth in 1882), Saperstein in the United Kingdom, Biasone and Renato William Jones in Italy, Ferenc Hepp in modern-day Hungary (Austria-Hungary at his birth in 1909), and Borislav Stanković in what is now Bosnia and Herzegovina (the Kingdom of Yugoslavia at his birth in 1925).

In total 81 individuals have been inducted as contributors.

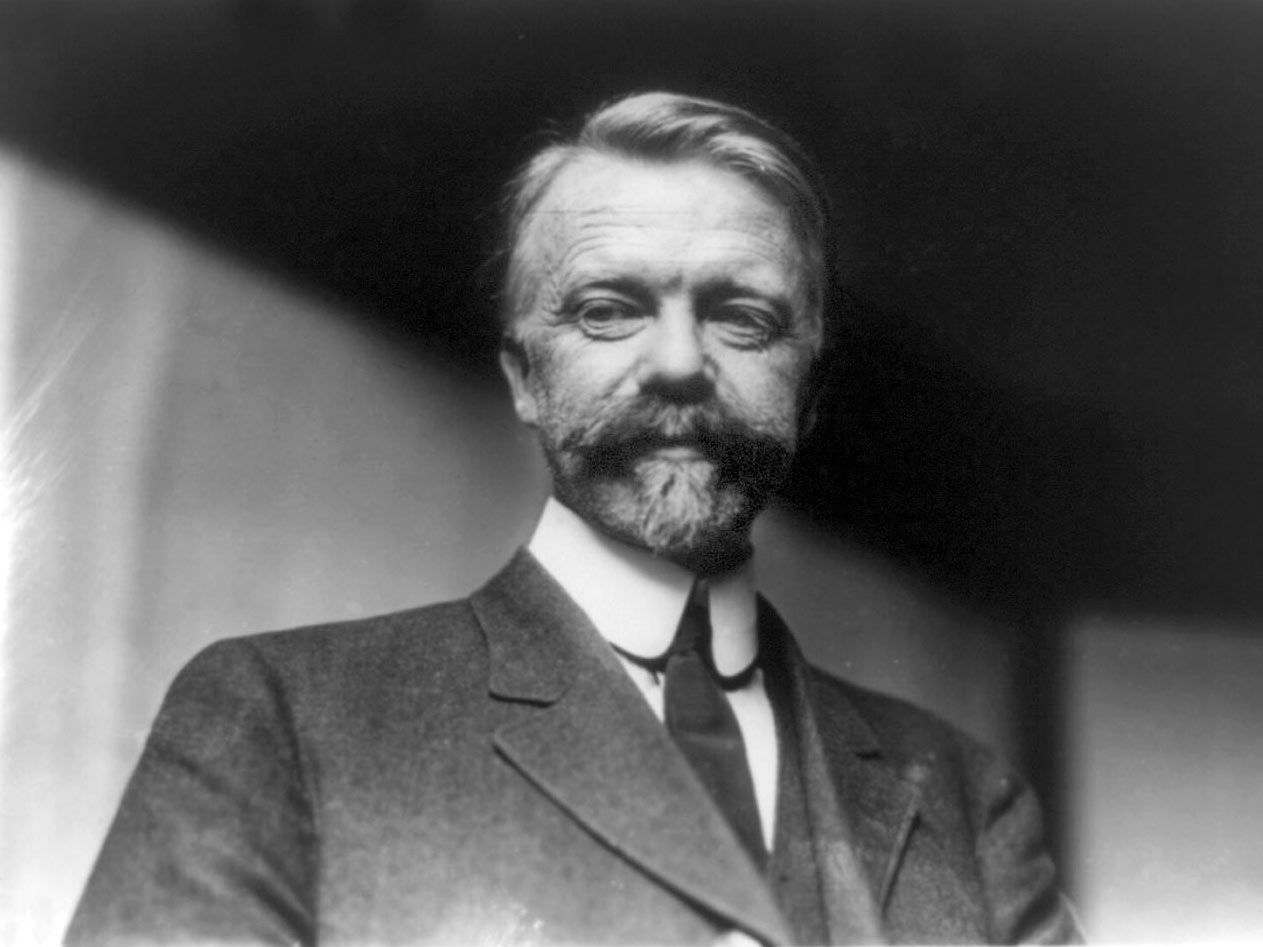
Luther Gulick, inducted in 1959

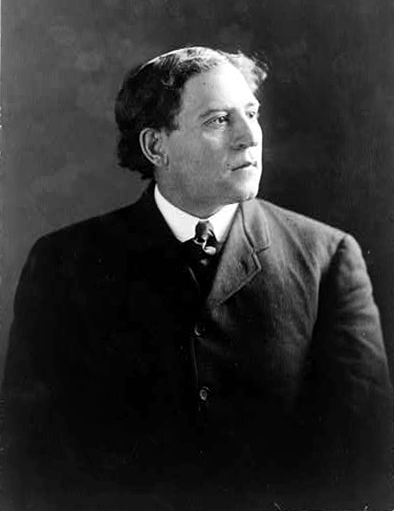
Amos Alonzo Stagg, inducted in 1959

Year	Inductee	Achievements	Ref.
1959	(United States) Luther H. Gulick	Head of Physical Education at School for Christian Workers (1887–1900); Chairman of Amateur Athletic Union (AAU) Basketball Committee (1895–1905)	
1959	(United States) Edward J. "Ed" Hickox	Represented New England in Olympic Trials (Springfield College, 1936); five New England championships (Springfield College); Board of Directors of Basketball Hall of Fame (1959–66); National Association of Basketball Coaches (NABC) historian (1944–66)	
1959	(United States) Ralph Morgan	Founded Collegiate Basketball Rules Committee (1905); Secretary and Treasurer of Rules Committee (1905–31); Founded Eastern Intercollegiate Basketball League (now the Ivy League) (1910); Secretary and Treasurer of Eastern Intercollegiate Basketball League (1910–31)	
1959	(Canada) (United States) James Naismith	Physical education instructor (Springfield College, 1890–95); invented the game of "basket ball", (now called basketball); developed basketball's original 13 rules; physical education professor (Kansas, 1917–37), FIBA Hall of Fame (2007)	
1959	(United States) Harold G. Olsen	Big Ten Championships (Ohio State; 1925, 1933, 1939, 1944, 1946); helped found NCAA tournament (1939); Chairman of NCAA Rules Committee; first Coach of Basketball Association of America's (BAA) Chicago Stags (1946–49)	
1959	(United States) Amos Alonzo Stagg	Played in the first public basketball game at Springfield and scored the team's only basket in a 5–1 loss; 7 Big Ten titles during late 19th century and early 20th century (Chicago)	
1959	(United States) Oswald Tower	Member of Basketball Rules Committee (1910–60); Editor of Official Basketball Guide (1915–60); official rules interpreter (1915–60); coach of Wilbraham (MA) Academy (1907–10)	
1960	(United States) Henry V. Porter	First representative for high schools on the National Basketball Rules Committee; pioneered use of motion pictures to study proper playing techniques; edited the first high school rule book (1936); edited the first state high school association publication, the Illinois High School Athlete	
1961	(United States) John J. O'Brien	President, Metropolitan Basketball League (1922–28, 1931–33); President and chairman of the board, American Basketball League (1928–31, 1933–53); dedicated to the advancement of professional basketball in the East; supporter of referees and one of the first league administrators to begin fining players	
1961	(United States) Arthur A. Schabinger	Officiated in the Missouri Valley Conference, Big Eight, Kansas and Missouri Conferences, and the national AAU championships; one of the founders of the NABC; author of the NABC's Constitution and By-Laws, and designer of its emblem; promoted the adoption of molded basketball by colleges	
1961	(United States) Arthur L. Trester	Commissioner of Indiana High School Athletic Association (1922–44); coach and referee in Indiana; known as the "Czar" of Indiana high school athletics	
1962	(United States) Pop Morgenweck	Operated and coached professional teams in 14 cities in the National, New England, Western Massachusetts, Hudson River, Central, New York State, Inter-State, Metropolitan, Eastern States, and American leagues (1901–32); National League championship (Camden, 1904); Metropolitan League championships (Patterson, 1923; Kingston, 1928)	
1962	(United States) Lynn W. St. John	Lobbied for formal national and international rules for amateur basketball for three decades; served on NCAA Rules Committee with James Naismith (1912–37); chairman, Rules Committee (1919–37); Member, Olympic Basketball Committee (1936)	
1963	(United States) William A. Reid	Director of athletics, University of Detroit (1919); Director of athletics, Colgate University (1936–55); President, Eastern Collegiate Athletic Conference (ECAC) (1944–45); Director ECAC Executive Council (1945–49)	
1964	(United States) John W. Bunn	Coached Stanford to Pacific Coast Conference championships (1936–38); Helms Athletic Foundation Championship (Stanford, 1937); chairman, Basketball Hall of Fame (1949–63); Editor, College Guide and Official Rules Interpreter (1959–60). John Bunn Award (1973).	
1964	(United States) Edward S. "Ned" Irish	Basketball director, Madison Square Garden (1934); integral in formation of BAA (1946); founded the New York Knicks (1946); President, New York Knicks (1946–74)	
1964	(United Kingdom) R. William Jones	Co-founded the International Amateur Basketball Federation (FIBA) (1932); organized men's and women's European Championships (1935–63); organized men's and women's World Championships (1950–63); organized Olympic Basketball Tournament (1936–60), FIBA Hall of Fame (2007)	
1965	(United States) Walter A. Brown	President of the Boston Garden (1937–64); founded the Boston Celtics (1946); Celtics owner (1946–64); spearheaded the formation of the NBA (1949); President of the International Ice Hockey Federation	
1965	(United States) Paul D. "Tony" Hinkle	Helms Athletic Foundation Championship (Butler, 1924, 1929); President, NABC (1954–55); chairman, Rules Committee of the National Basketball Committee of U.S. and Canada; coached the Great Lakes Navy teams during World War II	
1965	(United States) William G. "Bill" Mokray	Started concept of college basketball doubleheaders at the Boston Garden (1944–45); first Chairman of the Hall of Fame Honors Committee (1959–64); owned the world's largest basketball library; considered the number-one authority on the game's history	
1968	(United States) Clair F. Bee	Influential in the development of 3-second rule; developed the 1-3-1 zone defense; National Invitation Tournament (NIT) championship (Long Island University, 1939, 1941); Author, Chip Hilton's Sports Stories for Young People'; Coach of the Baltimore Bullets (1952–54)	
1969	(United States) Charles H. "Chuck" Taylor	Shoe salesman; Organized first basketball clinic at North Carolina State University (1922); developed the popular Converse Basketball Yearbook (1922); selected All-America teams (1932); The Chuck Taylor "All-Star" was the official shoe of the Olympics (1936–68)	
1971	(United States) Abraham M. "Abe" Saperstein	Owner of the Harlem Globetrotters. Saperstein's Globetrotters played before 55 million fans in 87 countries; the Globetrotters were part of the first basketball sellout ever at Madison Square Garden; led the Globetrotters to the World Professional Title (1940); won the International Cup with the Globetrotters (1943–44)	
1972	(United States) Robert L. "Bob" Douglas	Owned and coached New York Renaissance (1922–49); World Professional Championship with Renaissance (1939); known as "The Father of Black Professional Basketball"	
1972	(United States) Eddie Gottlieb	BAA Championship (Philadelphia Warriors, 1947); NBA Championship (Philadelphia Warriors, 1956); Coach and Owner of Warriors (1946–55 and 1946–62); Chairman of NBA Rules Committee for 25 years; served as NBA schedule maker for 30 years. John Bunn Award (1979).	
1972	(United States) W.R. Clifford "Cliff" Wells	50 district, regional, and invitational tournaments, including two championships (Indiana state; 1919, 1934); first President, Indiana High School Coaching Association; member of National Rules Committee (1952–56); first full-time executive secretary and director of Naismith Memorial Basketball Hall of Fame (1963–66)	
1973	(United States) Elmer H. Ripley	2 NCAA Tournament (Georgetown; 1941, 1943); Eastern Championship (Georgetown, 1943); Israeli Olympic team coach (Melbourne, 1956); Canadian Olympic team coach (Rome, 1960)	
1974	(United States) Harry A. Fisher	2 Helms Athletic Foundation Championship (Columbia; 1904–05); Helms Athletic Foundation All-America (Columbia; 1904–05); Eastern Intercollegiate League championship (Columbia; 1911–12, 1914); editor of Collegiate Guide (1905–15)	
1974	(United States) Maurice Podoloff	Served as NBA's first commissioner (1949–63); negotiated NBA's first TV contract (1954); arranged for construction and use of the first 24-second clock (1954); NBA's MVP Award was named in his honor until 2021.	
1975	(United States) Emil S. Liston	2 Kansas Conference Championship (Baker University; 1930, 1937); President of Kansas Conference Coaches Association (1936–38); created National Association of Intercollegiate Basketball (NAIB)/National Association of Intercollegiate Athletics (NAIA) tournament (1937); served as NAIA executive secretary (1940–49)	
1979	(United States) John B. McLendon	3 NAIA championship (Tennessee State; 1957–59); NAIA Coach of the Year (1958); 8 CIAA championships (1941, 1943–44, 1946–47, 1949–50, 1952); first African-American coach with Cleveland Pipers of the American Basketball League, later coach of the Denver Rockets (ABA)	
1979	(United States) Peter F. "Pete" Newell	NCAA Championship (California; 1959); NIT Championship (San Francisco, 1949); Olympic Gold Medal (Rome, 1960) with the 1960 United States Olympic Team inducted as a unit in 2010; National Coach of the Year (1960), FIBA Hall of Fame (2009)	
1980	(United States) Lester "Les" Harrison	Organized Rochester Seagrams, Ebers, and Pros (1920s–40s); Owner of Rochester Royals (1945–1958); NBA championship (Rochester Royals, 1951); instrumental in formation of NBA (1949); organized Kodak Classic Collegiate Tournament (now Rochester Basketball Classic)	
1981	(Hungary) Ferenc Hepp	Member of FIBA Technical Commission (1948–56); President of Hungarian Basketball Federation (1954); member of FIBA Central Board (1956); member of FIBA Commission of Finances and Amateurism (1960–80), FIBA Hall of Fame (2007)	
1981	(United States) James Walter Kennedy	Public Relations Director (BAA/NBA; 1946–51); Public Relations Director (Harlem Globetrotters, 1950s); NBA Commissioner (1963–75); John Bunn Award (1975); NBA named their citizenship award in his honor	
1982	(United States) Alva O. Duer	NAIB Finals appearance (Pepperdine; 1945); Director and founder of NAIB/NAIA National Basketball Championship Tournament (1949–75); member of U.S. Basketball Association Ethics Committee (1960–64); Board of Directors, U.S. Olympic Committee	
1983	(United States) Louis G. Wilke	Chairman, AAU Basketball Committee, seven terms; chairman and team manager, Olympic Basketball Committee (1948); Executive board member, U.S. Olympic Committee (1956, 1960); Vice-chairman, Pan American Federation and FIBA Rules Committee (1962)	
1984	(United States) Clifford B. "Cliff" Fagan	Executive Secretary of Wisconsin Interscholastic Athletic Association (1947–57); Secretary of National Basketball Rules Committee (1958–77); executive director of the National Federation of State High School Athletic Associations (1958–77); member of U.S. Olympic Committee Board of Directors (1961–76). John Bunn Award (1977).	
1984	(United States) Edward S. "Ed" Steitz	Instrumental in the reinstatement of the dunk (1976); eliminated jump ball with the exception of the start of the game and overtime (1981); advocate of the 45-second shot clock and three-point shot (1985); NIT Selection Committee (1962–68), FIBA Hall of Fame (2007)	
1985	(United States) Senda Berenson Abbott	Director of Physical Education (Smith College; 1892–11); organized first women's game at Smith College (March 22, 1893); author, Basketball Guide for Women (1901–07); chairperson, Basketball Committee for Women (1905–17)	
1985	(United States) Bertha F. Teague	8 Oklahoma state championships and 7 runners-up; compiled 36 20-plus win seasons, including 28 consecutive (1930–57); founded the first girls' basketball clinic and camp in the Southwest; coach of the Decade (1930s, 1940s, 1960s) by Jim Thorpe Athletic Awards Committee (1974)	
1991	(United States) Lawrence "Larry" Fleisher	NBA Players Association general counsel (1963–87); developed free-agent system (1976); established antidrug agreement; involved in ABA–NBA merger	
1991	(United States) Lawrence F. "Larry" O'Brien	NBA Commissioner (1975–84); The Sporting News Sportsman of the Year (1976); created NBA college scholarship program (1980); developed antidrug program (1984); President, Basketball Hall of Fame (1985–87). John Bunn Award (1984).	
1991	(Socialist Federal Republic of Yugoslavia) (Serbia) Borislav "Boris" Stankovic	Italian national championship (Oransoda team, 1968); oversaw the introduction of the three-point line in international competition; overseen reorganization of FIBA into zonal administration system; member of International Olympic Committee, FIBA Hall of Fame (2007)	
1999	(United States) Wayne R. Embry	Five-time NBA All-Star (1961–65); NBA championship (Boston Celtics, 1968); first African American NBA general manager (Milwaukee Bucks, 1971–79); later GM of the Cleveland Cavaliers; The Sporting News NBA Executive of the Year (1992, 1998)	
1999	(United States) Fred Zollner	Owner of the Fort Wayne Zollner Pistons/Detroit Pistons (1941–1974); NBL championship (Fort Wayne Zollner Pistons, 1944–45); key figure in the merger of the BAA and NBL to form the NBA; NBA Finals appearance (Fort Wayne Pistons, 1955–56); named "Mr. Pro Basketball" at the 1975 Silver Anniversary All-Star Game	
2000	(United States) Daniel "Danny" Biasone	President and founder (Syracuse Nationals, 1946–63); inventor of 24-second shot clock (1954); NBA championship (Syracuse Nationals, 1955); John Bunn Award (1982)	
2000	(United States) Charles Martin Newton	NCAA Championship (Kentucky, 1951); Southeastern Conference (SEC) Coach of the Year (1972 and 1976 with Alabama, 1988 and 1989 with Vanderbilt); President, USA Basketball (1992–96); John Bunn Award (1997)	
2003	(United States) Francis D. "Chick" Hearn	Los Angeles Lakers broadcaster; Three-time National Sportscaster of the Year (1959, 1965, 1987); Curt Gowdy Media Award (1992); Emmy Award for Excellence in Basketball Coverage (1965); Star on Hollywood Walk of Fame (1986)	
2003	(United States) Meadowlark Lemon	Longtime player for the Harlem Globetrotters; John Bunn Award (1998); played in more than 16,000 games; known as the "Clown Prince of Basketball"	
2003	(United States) Earl F. Lloyd	CIAA "Player of the Decade" for the 1940s; NAIA Silver and Golden Anniversary Teams; first African American to play in an NBA game (1950); NBA Championship Team (1955); first African American bench coach (1968)	
2004	(United States) Jerry Colangelo	Owner and GM of the Phoenix Suns; The Sporting News NBA Executive of the Year (1976, 1981, 1989, 1993); youngest general manager in professional sports (1968); enshrined in Illinois Basketball Hall of Fame (1995); former chairman and CEO of the Arizona Diamondbacks; GM of the U.S. Men's National Basketball team (2005–present)	
2005	(United States) Hubert "Hubie" Brown	Coach of the Atlanta Hawks; New York Knicks and Memphis Grizzlies; Two-time NBA Coach of the Year (1978, 2004); ABA Championship (Kentucky Colonels, 1975); Curt Gowdy Media Award (2000); nominated for a Sports Emmy (1994, 1999)	
2006	(United States) Dave Gavitt	Coach, 1980 United States Olympic Team; five-time New England Coach of the Year; founder of the Big East Conference; John Bunn Lifetime Achievement Award (1987); Naismith Outstanding Contribution to Basketball Award winner (1993)	
2008	(United States) William Davidson	Principal owner, Detroit Pistons (1974–2009); NBA championships (Detroit Pistons, 1989–90, 2004); Women's National Basketball Association (WNBA) championships (Detroit Shock, 2003, 2006, 2008); first owner in North American sports history to win championships in three different major professional leagues (NBA, WNBA, and National Hockey League (NHL))	
2008	(United States) Richard "Dick" Vitale	ESPN Broadcaster; Sports Personality of the Year by the American Sportscasters Association (1989); Curt Gowdy Media Award (1998); NABC Cliff Wells Appreciation Award (2000); Books include Time Out Baby!, Campus Chaos, Living a Dream and Holding Court	
2010	(United States) Jerry Buss	Owner of the Los Angeles Lakers (1979–2013) and Los Angeles Sparks (1997–2006); 10 NBA championships (Lakers, 1980, 1982, 1985, 1987–88, 2000–02, 2009–10); 2 WNBA championships (Sparks, 2001–02)	
2011	(United States) Tom "Satch" Sanders	Player with the Boston Celtics (1960–73); 8 NBA championships (1961–66, 1968, 1969); later coach of the Celtics and Harvard University; key developer of the NBA's Rookie Transition Program and founder of many of the league's player programs; John Bunn Award (2007)	
2011	(United States) Tex Winter	Architect of the triangle offense; two NCAA Final Fours at Kansas State University (1958, 1964); UPI National Coach of the Year (1958); NABC president, 1982–83; nine NBA titles as an assistant (Chicago Bulls, 1991–1993, 1996–1998; Los Angeles Lakers, 2000–2002); John Bunn Award (1998)	
2012	(United States) Donald "Don" Barksdale	First African American to be named to a major college All-America team (Helms Foundation, 1947, with UCLA); first African American to play for and win Olympic gold with Team USA (1948); first African American to play in the NBA All-Star Game (1953)	
2012	(United States) Phil Knight	Co-founder of Nike, "credited with expanding the game of basketball around the world through its innovative products and influential marketing" and "the first sports brand to incorporate top athletes to connect with consumers emotionally"	
2013	(United States) Russ Granik	NBA executive from 1976 to 2006, "involved in every major negotiation including television contracts, collective bargaining, and league expansion" during his tenure; also president of USA Basketball who helped oversee the inclusion of NBA players in the 1992 Olympic "Dream Team"	
2013	(United States) Edwin Bancroft Henderson	Dubbed the "Father of Black Basketball"; introduced the sport to the black community in Washington, D.C., in the early 20th century and formed many organizations to govern and promote the sport among African Americans	
2014	(United States) David Stern	NBA commissioner from 1984 to 2014, during which time the league expanded by seven teams and signed several lucrative TV deals. Also responsible for the creation of the WNBA, the draft lottery, and several league outreach organizations. FIBA Hall of Fame (2016).	
2015	(United States) George Raveling	Longtime college coach and broadcaster who served on the boards of many major basketball organizations, among them the NABC, NCAA, USA Basketball, and Nike, also serving as Nike's director of grassroots and international basketball. John Bunn Award (2013).	
2016	(United States) Jerry Reinsdorf	Owner and chairman of the Chicago Bulls since 1985, turning the franchise into a lucrative business that won six NBA Championships in the 1990s (1991–1993 and 1996–1998)	
2017	(United States) Rebecca Lobo	She was a member of the NCAA National Champion Connecticut Huskies (1995). She won several awards including; AP Female Athlete of the Year, the Wade Trophy, the Naismith Award, WBCA National Player of the Year and USBWA National Player of the Year.	
2017	(United States) Mannie Jackson	A Harlem Globetrotters star, He saved the team from extinction by buying it and becoming its CEO from 1993 to 2007. Mannie Jackson is the First African-American to own a major International sports and entertainment organization. He was also the Chairman of the Naismith Memorial Basketball Hall of Fame (2007–2009).	
2017	(United States) Tom Jernstedt	An NCAA administrator with a career of 38 years. He formerly played for Oregon Ducks as a quarterback. He helped in increasing the revenue of NCAA Basketball television contract from $1.2 billion when he arrived to $10.8 billion when he left in 2010. John Bunn Award (2001).	
2017	(United States) Jerry Krause	Was Executive Vice President & general manager of the Chicago Bulls during their Michael Jordan-led dynasty years. Won 6 NBA championships as Bulls' GM (1991, 1992, 1993, 1996, 1997, 1998), and also won the NBA Executive of the Year Award twice (1988 & 1996).	
2018	(United States) Rod Thorn	Player, coach, general manager and league executive. 2002 NBA Executive of the Year. John Bunn Award (2015).	
2018	(United States) Rick Welts	President and chief executive officer of the Phoenix Suns (2002–2011), and the Golden State Warriors (2011–2021); Won 3 NBA championships as Warriors' President (2015, 2017, 2018) in a 5-year span (2015–2019).	
2019	(United States) Al Attles	1975 NBA champion as a coach for the Warriors. No. 16 retired by the Golden State Warriors. No. 22 retired by North Carolina A&T. John Bunn Award (2014).	
2020	(Switzerland) Patrick Baumann	Secretary General of the FIBA (2003–2018). Primarily focused on the youth sector and the expansion of 3x3 basketball as a global game, while developing programs and events to grow basketball worldwide.	
2021	(United States) Val Ackerman	Widely regarded as a trailblazing basketball executive and significant contributor to women's and men's basketball on the collegiate, professional and international level. Served as WNBA President from the league's inception in 1996 to 2005, and USA Basketball's first female President from 2005 to 2008. Since 2013, led the BIG EAST Conference as Commissioner, launching several initiatives including BIG EAST Serves, the Digital Network, the Student-Athlete Well-Being Forum, and winning two NCAA basketball national championships (Villanova 2016, 2018). A recipient of the John Bunn Lifetime Achievement Award (2008), the Edward Steitz Award (2013) and the Women's Sports Foundation Billie Jean King Award (2016), as well as an enshrinee of the Women's Basketball Hall of Fame (2011).	
2021	(United States) Howard Garfinkel	Co-founder and longtime director of Five-Star Basketball Camp, which revolutionized scouting, recruiting, and coaching development. Five-Star's drill-station style became the standard for basketball camps and countless participants went on to play in the NBA. Prior to Five-Star, he started High School Basketball Illustrated in 1965, the first high school scouting report. He was inducted into the Collegiate Basketball Hall of Fame in 2013.	
2022	(United States) Lawrence "Larry" Costello	Player and coach. Played for the Philadelphia Warriors, Syracuse Nationals/Philadelphia 76ers and Wilkes-Barre Barons (1954–1968). Coached the Milwaukee Bucks, Chicago Bulls, Milwaukee Does and Utica College (1968–1987). NBA champion as a player with the 76ers in 1967. NBA champion as a coach with the Bucks in 1971. Six-time NBA All-Star.	
2022	(United States) Delmer "Del" Harris	Coach or assistant coach at the collegiate, professional and international levels from 1965 to 2012, including six NBA teams. Named 1995 Coach of the Year with the Los Angeles Lakers. John Bunn Award (2019).	
2023	(United States) Jim Valvano	1983 NCAA championship with North Carolina State, 1989 ACC Coach of the Year, 1993 Arthur Ashe Award for Courage.	
2024	(United States) Doug Collins	4X NBA All-Star, 1972 Olympic silver medalist, 1973 first team All-American. Long time NBA coach and TV analyst	
2024	(United States) Herb Simon	Owner of the Indiana Pacers and Indiana Fever. Longest tenured NBA and WNBA owner. 2 NBA Finals appearances (2000, 2025), 3 WNBA Finals appearances (2009, 2012, 2015), and 1 WNBA championship (2012).	
2024	(United States) Jerry West	2X NBA Executive of the Year, 6X NBA championships as executive with the Los Angeles Lakers, 2X NBA championships as executive with the Golden State Warriors.	
2025	(United States) Micky Arison	Owner of the Miami Heat, who led the franchise to three NBA championships (2006, 2012, 2013) and seven Eastern Conference titles.	
2026	(United States) (Italy) Mike D'Antoni	2X NBA Coach of the Year (2005, 2017), Coach of "Seven Seconds or Less" Phoenix Suns that redefined NBA offenses, Assistant coach on gold-medal-winning 2012 Olympic team	

=== Players ===
As part of the inaugural class of 1959, four players were inducted, including George Mikan, who was the first NBA player to be enshrined. In total, 177 or 178 players, depending on Nathaniel Clifton's classification, have been inducted into the Hall of Fame. Of these, 110 or 111, again depending on Clifton's classification, have played in the NBA. The 1993 class had the most player inductees, with eight. No players were inducted in 1965, 1967, 1968 and 2007. Five players have also been inducted as coaches: John Wooden in 1973, Lenny Wilkens in 1998, Bill Sharman in 2004, Tom Heinsohn in 2015, and Bill Russell in 2021.

Thirty-seven player inductees are women: Lusia Harris-Stewart (1992), Nera D. White (1992), Ann E. Meyers (1993), Uļjana Semjonova (1993), Carol A. Blazejowski (1994), Anne T. Donovan (1994), Cheryl Miller (1995), Nancy I. Lieberman (1996), Joan Crawford (1997), Denise M. Curry (1997), Lynette Woodard (2004), Hortência de Fatima Marcari (2005), Cynthia Cooper-Dyke (2010), Teresa Edwards (2011), Katrina McClain Johnson (2012), Dawn Staley (2013), Lisa Leslie (2015), Sheryl Swoopes (2016), Rebecca Lobo (2017), Katie Smith (2018), Tina Thompson (2018), Teresa Weatherspoon (2019), Tamika Catchings (2020), Yolanda Griffith (2021), Lauren Jackson (2021), Pearl Moore (2021), Swin Cash (2022), Theresa Grentz (2022), Lindsay Whalen (2022), Becky Hammon (2023), Seimone Augustus (2024), Sue Bird (2025), Sylvia Fowles (2025), Maya Moore (2025), Elena Delle Donne (2026), Chamique Holdsclaw (2026) and Candace Parker (2026). Among these, Lieberman, Woodard, Cooper-Dyke, Edwards, Staley, Leslie, Smith, Swoopes, Lobo, Thompson, Weatherspoon, Catchings, Griffith, Jackson, Cash, Whalen, Hammon, Augustus, Bird, Fowles, Moore, Delle Donne, Holdsclaw, and Parker have played in the Women's National Basketball Association. Harris-Stewart is the only female drafted by an NBA team, while Meyers is the only one to have been signed by an NBA team.

Two player inductees have won the John Bunn Award—Bob Cousy and Wooden.

Twenty player inductees were born outside the United States. Canadian-born Robert J. "Bob" Houbregs (inducted 1987) was drafted by NBA's Milwaukee Hawks in 1953 and played five seasons in the league. Four inductees were born in the former Soviet Union: Sergei A. Belov, Šarūnas Marčiulionis, Arvydas Sabonis, and Uljana Semjonova. Belov, inducted in 1992, was born in modern-day Russia; Sabonis and Marčiulionis, respectively inducted in 2011 and 2014, were born in today's Lithuania. All three players won gold medals for the USSR at the Olympic Games. Marčiulionis and Sabonis each added two bronze medals for Lithuania after the restoration of its independence in 1990; Marčiulionis is also credited by the Hall with resurrecting the Lithuania national team after independence. Semjonova, inducted in 1993, was born in what is now Latvia. She won two Olympic golds with the USSR women's team.

Krešimir Ćosić, Dražen Petrović, Dražen Dalipagić, Dino Rađa, Vlade Divac, Toni Kukoč and Radivoj Korać (inducted in 1996, 2002, 2004, 2018, 2019, 2021 and 2022 respectively) represented Yugoslavia internationally during their careers. Petrović, Rađa and Kukoč represented Croatia after the initial breakup of Yugoslavia in 1991. Italian-born Dino Meneghin (inducted 2003) spent his entire career playing in the Italian A League.

Three Brazilians have represented their homeland internationally: Hortência de Fatima Marcari (inducted in 2005) for the women's national team, Maciel "Ubiratan" Pereira (inducted in 2010) and Oscar Schmidt (inducted in 2013) for the men's national team. Dikembe Mutombo (inducted in 2015) was born in the country now known as the Democratic Republic of the Congo. Yao Ming, inducted in 2016, was born and raised in China. Manu Ginóbili, inducted in 2022, was born and raised in Argentina. He was 4 times NBA champion and won a Gold Medal in Athens 2004 against the United States Basketball Team for the first time since NBA players were allowed on the roster

American Dominique Wilkins, inducted in 2006, was born in France during his father's posting in that country as a member of the U.S. Air Force. John Isaacs (inducted in 2015) was born in Panama but raised in Harlem. Although born in New Jersey, 2017 inductee Nikos Galis played the whole of his professional career in Greece. 2018 inductee Steve Nash was born in Johannesburg, South Africa, and grew up in Canada.

=== Referees ===
The Referee category has existed since the beginning of the Hall of Fame and the first referee was inducted in 1959. Since then, eighteen referees have been inducted. Ernest C. Quigley, born in Canada, is the only inductee in this category born outside of the United States.

Year	Inductee	Achievements^{[a]}	Ref.
1959	(United States) Matthew P. "Pat" Kennedy	Officiated high school, college, and professional games (1924–56); officiated in NCAA and NIT tournaments; BAA/NBA supervisor of referees (1946–50); officiated for the Harlem Globetrotters (1950–56)	
1960	(United States) George T. Hepbron	Conducted first national rules seminar; editor of AAU Basketball Guide (1901–14); secretary of the Olympic Basketball Committee (1903)	
1961	(United States) George H. Hoyt	Founded Eastern Massachusetts Board of Approved Basketball Officials; founded New England Interscholastic Basketball Tournament; chief of officials for the Eastern Massachusetts High School Tournament; refereed high school and college games	
1961	(Canada) (United States) Ernest C. Quigley	Supervisor of NCAA tournament officials (1940–42); member of NCAA Football Rules Committee (1946–54); officiated more than 1,500 games in 40-year career; was Major League Baseball umpire for 25 years	
1961	(United States) David "Dave" Tobey	Officiated in the Eastern Intercollegiate Conference, the Eastern Conference, the Ivy League, and in the National Invitation Tournament; Executive Committee of the New York City High School Coaches Association; honorary member of the International Association of Approved Basketball Officials (IAABO)	
1962	(United States) David H. Walsh	New Jersey State championship at Hoboken High School (1924); associate director of Collegiate Basketball Officials Bureau (1941–56); co-author of first Manual of Basketball Officiating; officiated in the Eastern Intercollegiate Basketball Conference and the Eastern Conference	
1978	(United States) John P. Nucatola	Officiated in 18 NCAA tournaments, in 18 National Invitation Tournaments; original referee in the BAA and NBA (1946–54); officiated in the Olympics (Helsinki, 1952, Melbourne, 1956)	
1979	(United States) James E. "Jim" Enright	Officiated in Olympic playoffs (London, 1948, Helsinki, 1952), in NCAA Final Four (1954), in NCAA regional tournaments (1952, 1953); officiated two Major League Baseball All-Star Games (1950, 1962)	
1980	(United States) J. Dallas Shirley	Officiated in the Olympics (Rome, 1960); chief official of Pan American Games (1959); Chairman of U.S. Olympic Basketball Officials Committee (1976); conducted clinics in the U.S. and 13 foreign countries	
1983	(United States) Lloyd R. Leith	Officiated NCAA championship game between Kentucky and Kansas State (1951); officiated in the NCAA tournament for 16 years; became the tenth referee enshrined into the Hall; supervisor of officials of the Pacific Intercollegiate Athletic Conference (1955–62)	
1986	(United States) Zigmund J. "Red" Mihalik	Officiated 6 NCAA championship finals; refereed 3 NAIA Finals and 3 NIT Finals; officiated in the Olympics (Tokyo, 1964, Mexico City, 1968); best referee by Dell Publications	
1995	(United States) Earl Strom	Officiated in 7 NBA All-Star Games, in 29 NBA and ABA Finals; officiated in 2,400 regular season and 295 playoff games; NBA crew chief (1967–68)	
2007	(United States) Marvin "Mendy" Rudolph	Officiated 2,112 NBA games, a record at the time of his retirement; first referee to officiate more than 2,000 NBA games; referee of 8 NBA All-Star Games and at least 1 game of the NBA Finals for 22 consecutive seasons; NBA Head of Officials	
2012	(United States) Hank Nichols	Officiated six NCAA men's Division I championship games, including 1975 (the final game of John Wooden) and 1979 (the start of the rivalry between Larry Bird and Magic Johnson), and 10 Final Fours; only official to work the NCAA and NIT championship games in the same year; first NCAA Coordinator of Men's Basketball Officials (1986); often called the "John Wooden of officials"	
2015	(United States) Richard "Dick" Bavetta	Officiated in the NBA for 39 years, never missing a game in his entire career (2,635 games), including 27 NBA Finals games, over 250 playoff games, and three All-Star Games; first NBA official to call an Olympic game (1992)	
2016	(United States) Darell Garretson	Officiated in the NBA for 27 years from 1967 to 1994, and later served as NBA Supervisor of Officials for 17 years from 1981 to 1998. Credited for creating and heading the first union for NBA referees, known as the National Association of Basketball Referees, a predecessor to the present day NBRA.	
2022	(United States) Hubert "Hugh" Evans	Officiated in the NBA for 28 years from 1973 to 2001, including 1,969 regular season games, 35 NBA Finals games, over 170 playoff games and four All-Star Games. Served as the NBA Assistant Supervisor of Officials	
2025	(United States) Danny Crawford	Officiated in the NBA for 32 years from 1985 to 2017, including more than 2,000 regular season games, more than 300 playoff games, and in 23 consecutive NBA Finals games.	
2026	(United States) Joey Crawford	Referee for 39 seasons (1977-2016), Officiated 2,561 regular-season (second all time), 374 playoff (first), 50 NBA Finals games (first)	

=== Teams ===
The Team category has existed since the beginning of the Hall of Fame and the first teams were inducted in 1959. Four teams were enshrined before 1963, but the fifth was not enshrined until 2002. All told, 14 teams have been inducted, with the most recent being the 2008 United States Olympic Team inducted in 2025.

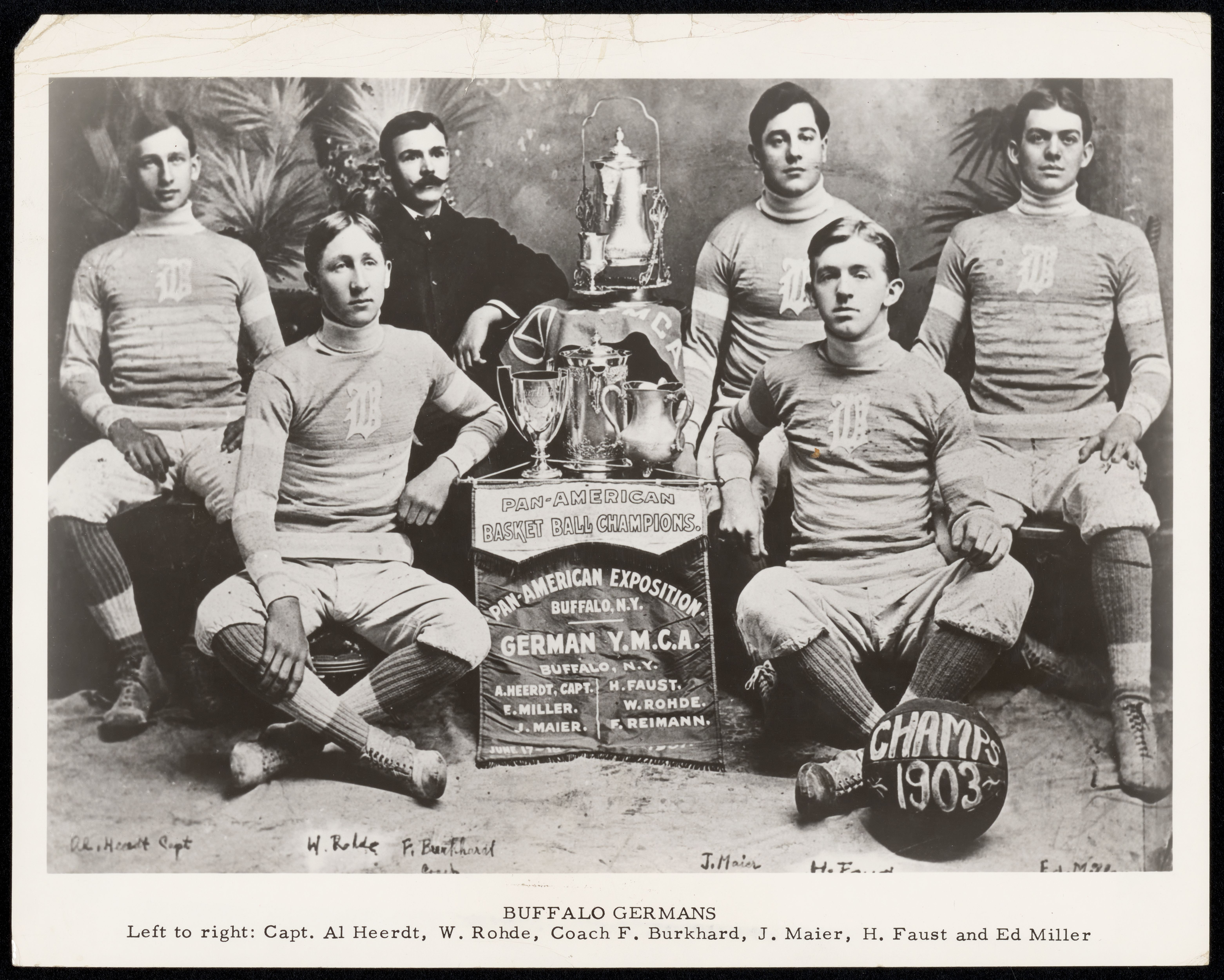
Buffalo Germans, inducted in 1961

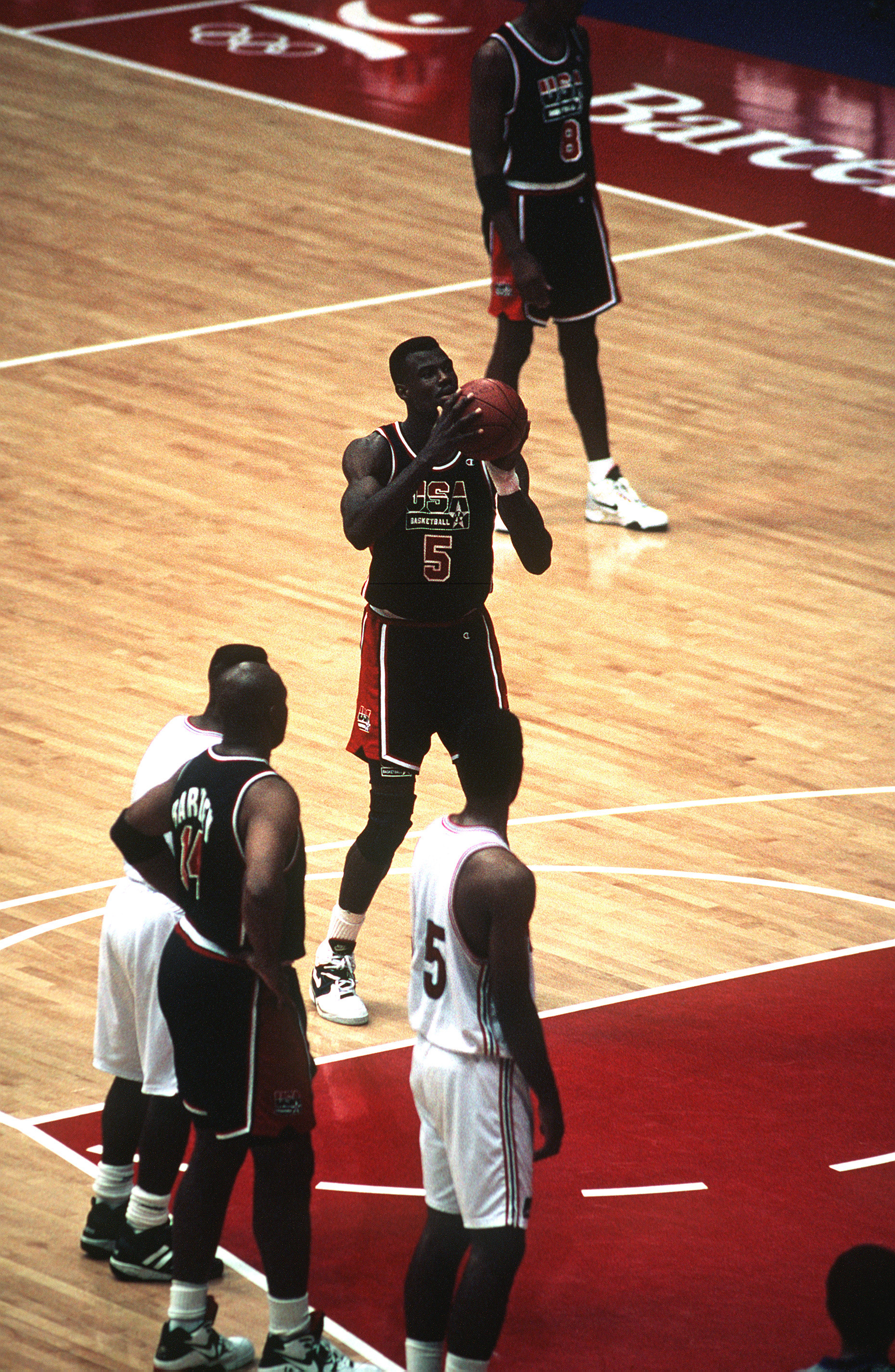
The 1992 United States national men basketball team playing at the 1992 Summer Olympics at Barcelona. The team was inducted in 2010.

Year	Inductee	Achievements^{[a]}	Ref.
1959	First Team	Founded during a class at the Springfield YMCA; first game of basketball played on December 21, 1891, and consisted of 18 players, 9 to a side; score of first game was 1–0; toured U.S. and helped popularize basketball in the months following its invention	
1959	Original Celtics	First professional team to sign exclusive player contracts; 2 American Basketball League (ABL) championships (1926–27); introduced post play, zone defenses, and switching man-to-man defense	
1961	Buffalo Germans	Pan American Championship (1901); Olympic exhibition title (St. Louis, 1904); went undefeated in 5 of first 18 seasons; won 111 straight games (1908–10)	
1963	New York Renaissance	Pioneering all-black team, compiled record of 2588–539 in the 1920s, 30s and 40s, Founded and owned by Hall of Famer Robert L. Douglas; World Professional Tournament (1939)	
2002	Harlem Globetrotters	Played more than 20,000 games in more than 100 countries; the 25th anniversary tour was highlighted by a game before 75,000 fans in Berlin's Olympic Stadium (1951); won John Bunn Award (1999)	
2007	Texas Western	Won the 1966 NCAA National Championship, started 5 African-American players (Bobby Joe Hill, David Lattin, Orsten Artis, Willie Worsley, & Harry Flournoy); finished the season with a 28–1 record; coached by Hall of Famer Don Haskins	
2010	1960 United States Olympic Team	Widely considered the greatest collegiate team ever assembled; won the gold medal at the 1960 Summer Olympics with an 8–0 record and an average victory margin of over 40 points; roster (Jay Arnette, Walt Bellamy, Bob Boozer, Terry Dischinger, Burdette Haldorson, Darrall Imhoff, Allen Kelley, Lester Lane, Jerry Lucas, Oscar Robertson, Adrian Smith, Jerry West) included four future Hall of Fame players (Bellamy, Lucas, Robertson, West) and 10 future NBA players, with four named consecutively as Rookies of the Year (Robertson, Bellamy, Dischinger, Lucas from 1961 to 1964) and three named among the 50 Greatest Players in NBA History in 1996 (Lucas, Robertson, West); coaching staff (Pete Newell, Warren Womble, Dutch Lonborg) included two future Hall of Famers (Newell and Lonborg)	
2010	1992 United States Olympic Team ("Dream Team")	Called by the Hall of Fame "the greatest collection of basketball talent on the planet"; won the gold medal at the 1992 Summer Olympics with an 8–0 record and an average victory margin of nearly 44 points; roster (Charles Barkley, Larry Bird, Clyde Drexler, Patrick Ewing, Magic Johnson, Michael Jordan, Christian Laettner, Karl Malone, Chris Mullin, Scottie Pippen, David Robinson, John Stockton) included 11 Hall of Fame players (all except Laettner) and 10 named among the NBA's 50 Greatest as well as NBA's 75 Greatest (all except Laettner and Mullin); coaching staff (Chuck Daly, Lenny Wilkens, Mike Krzyzewski, P. J. Carlesimo) included three Hall of Famers (Daly, Wilkens, Krzyzewski), FIBA Hall of Fame (2017)	
2012	All American Red Heads	All-women's team founded in 1936 playing against men's teams under men's rules; won 96 straight games at one point; credited by the Hall with "shattering stereotypes about female athletes and overcoming social barriers that existed on and off the basketball court"	
2014	Immaculata College	Called by the Hall "the first dynasty in women's college basketball"; won three consecutive AIAW national championships (1972–1974), including one undefeated season and a 35-game winning streak	
2019	Tennessee A&I State Teams of 1957, 1958, 1959	First African-American college team to win a major national championship and first college program to win three consecutive basketball national championships, led by Hall of Fame coach John McLendon (1979 & 2016) and players Dick Barnett and John "Rabbit" Barnhill.	
2019	Wayland Baptist Women's Teams of 1948–82	Held a 151-game winning streak from 1953 to 1958 and 10 overall AAU National Championships. They were inducted into the Women's Basketball Hall of Fame in 2013 along with these individuals: Harley Redin, coach 1955–73 (1999); Katherine Washington, 1957–60 (2000); Dean Weese, coach 1973–79 (2000); Claude Hutcherson, sponsor 1950–77 (2003); Patsy Neal, 1956–60 (2003); Marsha Sharp, player 1970-72 & coach 1972–74 (2003); Jill Rankin Schneider, 1975–78 (2011)	
2023	1976 United States Women's Olympic Team	The first time the United States had fielded a women's basketball team in the Olympics	
2025	2008 United States Olympic Team ("Redeem Team")	"Redeem Team" because the US got back-to-back bronze medals during the 2004 Summer Olympics and the 2006 FIBA World Championship; won the gold medal at the 2008 Summer Olympics with an 8–0 record and an average victory margin of nearly 28 points; roster (Carmelo Anthony, Carlos Boozer, Chris Bosh, Kobe Bryant, Dwight Howard, LeBron James, Jason Kidd, Chris Paul, Tayshaun Prince, Michael Redd, Dwyane Wade, Deron Williams) included 6 Hall of Fame players; coaching staff (Mike Krzyzewski, Jim Boeheim, Nate McMillan, Mike D'Antoni) included two Hall of Famers (Krzyzewski, Boeheim)	
2026	1996 United States Women's Olympic Team	The U.S. women's Olympic team won their third gold medal at the event. The team is considered to be one of the best in women's basketball history.	

== Notes ==
- ^{a} According to individuals' pages on the official website
