= John Bunn Award =

American annual basketball award

The John Bunn Award—in full, the John W. Bunn Lifetime Achievement Award—is an annual basketball award given by the Naismith Memorial Basketball Hall of Fame to an individual who has contributed significantly to the sport of basketball. Named after John Bunn, the first chairman of the Basketball Hall of Fame Committee from 1949 to 1969, the award is the highest and the most prestigious honor presented by the Basketball Hall of Fame other than enshrinement.

== Honorees ==
*	Elected to the Basketball Hall of Fame

Year	Recipient	Note
1973	John Bunn*	Inducted to the Hall of Fame as a contributor in 1964
1974	John Wooden*	Inducted to the Hall of Fame as a player in 1960 and a coach as 1973
1975	J. Walter Kennedy*	Inducted to the Hall of Fame as a contributor in 1981
1976	Henry P. Iba*	Inducted to the Hall of Fame as a coach in 1969
1977	Cliff Fagan*	Inducted to the Hall of Fame as a contributor in 1984
1978	Curt Gowdy	Another Hall of Fame award, the Curt Gowdy Media Award, is named after him
1979	Eddie Gottlieb*	Inducted to the Hall of Fame as a contributor in 1972
1980	Arnold "Red" Auerbach*	Inducted to the Hall of Fame as a coach in 1969
1981	Ray Meyer*	Inducted to the Hall of Fame as a coach in 1979
1982	Danny Biasone*	Inducted to the Hall of Fame as a contributor in 2000
1983	Robert J. Cousy*	Inducted to the Hall of Fame as a player in 1971; Another Hall of Fame award, the Bob Cousy Award, is named after him
1984	Lawrence F. O'Brien*	Inducted to the Hall of Fame as a contributor in 1991
1985	Lee Williams	
1986	Grady W. Lewis	
1987	Dave R. Gavitt*	Inducted to the Hall of Fame as a contributor in 2006
1988	Haskell Hillyard	
1989	George E. Killian	
1990	Pat Head Summitt*	Inducted to the Hall of Fame as a coach in 2000
1991	Morgan B. Wootten*	Inducted to the Hall of Fame as a coach in 2000
1992	Will Robinson	
1993	Joe Vancisin	
1994	Bill Wall	
1995	P. J. Carlesimo	
1996	Vic Bubas	
1997	C. M. Newton*	Inducted to the Hall of Fame as a contributor in 2000
1998	Tex Winter*	Inducted into the Hall of Fame as a contributor in 2011
1999	Harlem Globetrotters*	Inducted to the Hall of Fame as a team in 2002
2000	Meadowlark Lemon*	Inducted to the Hall of Fame as a contributor in 2003
2001	Tom Jernstedt*	Inducted to the Hall of Fame as a contributor in 2017
2002	Harvey Pollack	
2003	Joe O'Brien	
2004	Zelda Spoelstra	
2005	Marty Blake	
2006	Betty Jaynes	
2007	Thomas "Satch" Sanders	Inducted into the Hall of Fame as a contributor in 2011
2008	Val Ackerman	Inducted into the Hall of Fame as a contributor in 2021
2009	Johnny Kerr	
2010	Don Meyer	
2011	Brian McIntyre	
2012	Pat Williams	
2013	George Raveling	Inducted into the Hall of Fame as a contributor in 2015.
2014	Alvin Attles	Inducted to the Hall of Fame as a contributor in 2019
2015	Rod Thorn	Inducted into the Hall of Fame as a contributor in 2018.
2016	Jim Delany	
2017	Michael Goldberg	
2017	Donald Rowe	
2018	Jim Host	
2018	Harley Redin	
2019	Harry Glickman	
2019	Del Harris	Inducted into the Hall of Fame as a contributor in 2022.
2020	Timothy Nugent	
2021	Carol Stiff	
2022	Reggie Minton	
2023	Tom Konchalski	
2024	JoAn Scott	
2025	Jeff Twiss	
2026	Leah Wilcox	
