= Val Ackerman =

American sports administrator

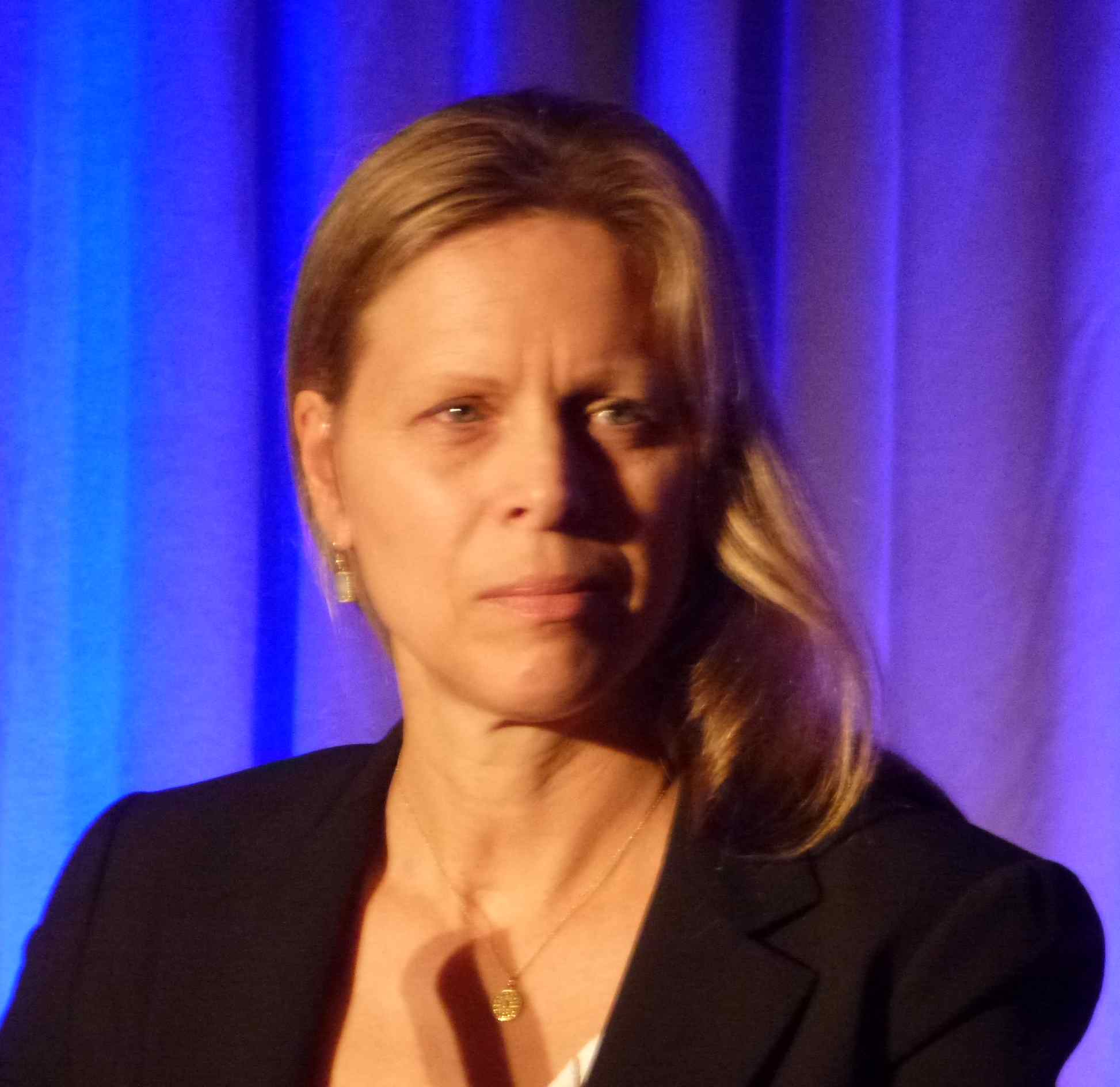

1st President of the Women's National Basketball Association
- In office August 7, 1996 – February 1, 2005
- Preceded by: position established
- Succeeded by: Donna Orender

Personal details
- Born: November 7, 1959 (age 66) Lakewood Township, New Jersey, U.S.
- Spouse: Charles Rappaport
- Children: 2
- Education: University of Virginia (BA); University of California, Los Angeles (JD)
- Occupation: Sports Executive

Valerie B. Ackerman (born November 7, 1959) is an American sports executive, lawyer, and former basketball player. She is the current commissioner of the Big East Conference. She is best known for being the first president of the Women's National Basketball Association (WNBA), serving from 1996 to 2005. She was inducted into the Women's Basketball Hall of Fame in 2011 and the Basketball Hall of Fame in 2021.

== Early life ==
Ackerman was born in 1959 in Lakewood Township, New Jersey, but grew up in Pennington, New Jersey, United States. She was raised Roman Catholic. Her grandfather was director of athletics for Trenton State College, and her father was director of athletics at her own high school.

She graduated in 1977 from Hopewell Valley Central High School in Hopewell Township, Mercer County, New Jersey. Her 1466 points set the school's varsity basketball career record for points scored by any basketball player, male or female, and she set the school's career scoring record as a halfback in field hockey, topped off by graduating second in her class. She also ran on her school's track team. She was inducted into the New Jersey State Interscholastic Athletic Association Hall of Fame in 1997.

== College years ==
Ackerman was a 1979 student initiate of Omicron Delta Kappa from the University of Virginia, where she graduated in 1981. She was among the school's first female students to receive an athletic scholarship. She was a starter all four years, captain three years, and twice named Academic All-American for the women's basketball team; she was the school's first basketball player to score 1,000 points. She earned her B.A. in Political and Social Thought. In 1997 she received U. Va.'s Distinguished Alumna Award from the University's Women's Center. In 2003, she was named a member of the Atlantic Coast Conference's 50th Anniversary Women's Basketball Team. She earned a J.D. degree from the University of California, Los Angeles (UCLA), and worked for two years as a corporate and banking associate at the New York City law firm of Simpson Thacher & Bartlett.

== Career ==
Ackerman played professional basketball in France for one season. In 1988, she was hired as a staff attorney for the National Basketball Association and later served as special assistant to NBA Commissioner David Stern, before being promoted to vice-president of business affairs, prior to her appointment to head the WNBA in 1996.

In 1989, she was one of the NBA's first appointees to the board of directors of USA Basketball — the organization responsible for the selection and training of the teams that represent the United States in international tournaments, including both the World Cup and the Olympics. In that capacity, she acted as a liaison between the NBA and USA Basketball regarding the 1992 Olympics, 1994 World Championships and 1996 Olympics. From 1995 to 1996, she was a driving force behind the creation of the USA Basketball Women's National Team program that culminated with a 60–0 record and the gold medal at the 1996 Atlanta Olympics.

On August 7, 1996, she was named president of the WNBA. Over the course of her historic eight-year term, she would become the first woman ever to successfully launch and operate a women's team sports league. On February 1, 2005, she stepped down, and Donna Orender was named as her successor; Laurel Richie succeeded Orender in 2011. In April 2005, Ackerman was named to Sports Business Journal's list of "the 20 Most Influential Women in Sports Business."

In May 2005, she became the first female president of USA Basketball for the 2005–2008 term, succeeding Tom Jernstedt from the NCAA, who served from 2000 to 2004. During her term, she oversaw a restructuring of the USA Basketball Board of Directors, and gold medal performances by the men's and women's basketball teams at the Beijing Olympics.

In 2006, she was named the U.S. delegate to the Central Board of the International Basketball Federation (FIBA), which is basketball's worldwide governing body, and was elected for a second four-year term in 2010. She is also a member of FIBA's Competition Commission. Since 2013, she serves or has served on the Executive Committee of the Naismith Memorial Basketball Hall of Fame, the Board of Directors of the Women's Basketball Hall of Fame, the Knight Commission on Intercollegiate Athletics, and both the NCAA's Women's Basketball Competition Committee and its Honors Committee. She is a past member of the national board of directors of Girls Incorporated, the Board of Directors of the Virginia Athletics Foundation, and the National Board of Trustees for the March of Dimes.

Since 2009, she has been a member of the adjunct faculty for Columbia University's Master of Science in Sports Management Program, where she has taught Leadership and Personnel Management with Neal Pilson, former President of CBS Sports.

On June 26, 2013, she was named as the first commissioner of the newly reorganized Big East Conference, after the seven non-football sponsoring schools split from the ten football-playing schools (which formed themselves into the American Athletic Conference) that year.

She has also been a contributing columnist for ESPNW.com.

== Awards and honors ==
Ackerman's honors have included the Brandweek Co-Marketer of the Year Award in 1997, which she shared with Rick Welts, then President of NBA Properties; the New Jersey Sportswriters Association Executive of the Year Award in 1998; the March of Dimes Sports Achievement Award in 1997; induction into the GTE Academic All-America Hall of Fame in 1999; and the National Mother's Day Committee's Outstanding Mother Award in 2002. She has also been inducted into the International Scholar-Athlete Hall of Fame, and received the National Women of Distinction Award from Girl Scouts of the USA.

In 2006, she was named a recipient of the NCAA's Silver Anniversary Award, which is awarded to former student athletes who have achieved personal distinction since graduation. In 2008, she received the IOC's Women of Distinction diploma, and the John Bunn Lifetime Achievement Award from the Naismith Memorial Basketball Hall of Fame.

In 2010, she was named an inductee of the Women's Basketball Hall of Fame's Class of 2011. She was inducted into the Women's Basketball Hall of Fame in 2011. In 2011, she was named a Champion in Sports Business by Sports Business Journal. The Women's Sports Foundation named her one of its "40 for 40" honorees as part of its celebration of the 40th anniversary of Title IX in 2012. In 2013 she received USA Basketball's Edward S. Steitz Award.

In 2021 she was inducted into the Basketball Hall of Fame, and is a "Life Trustee" of the Hall, which is the "highest honor a Hall of Fame Board member can receive".

== Ackerman report ==
In November 2012, Ackerman was hired by the National Collegiate Athletic Association (NCAA) to study the women's game and come up with recommendations for improvement. She conveyed preliminary conclusions in a presentation at a Women's Basketball Coaches Association convention, and followed up with a formal written report in June 2013. Some of the proposals including cutting the number of scholarships (to improve parity), changing the dates or locations of the NCAA Tournament, and possible rules changes such as reducing the shot clock.

== Personal life ==
Ackerman lives in New York City with her husband, Charles Rappaport. They have two grown daughters, Emily and Sally.
