= Shelley Matheson =

Australian wheelchair basketball player (born 1984)

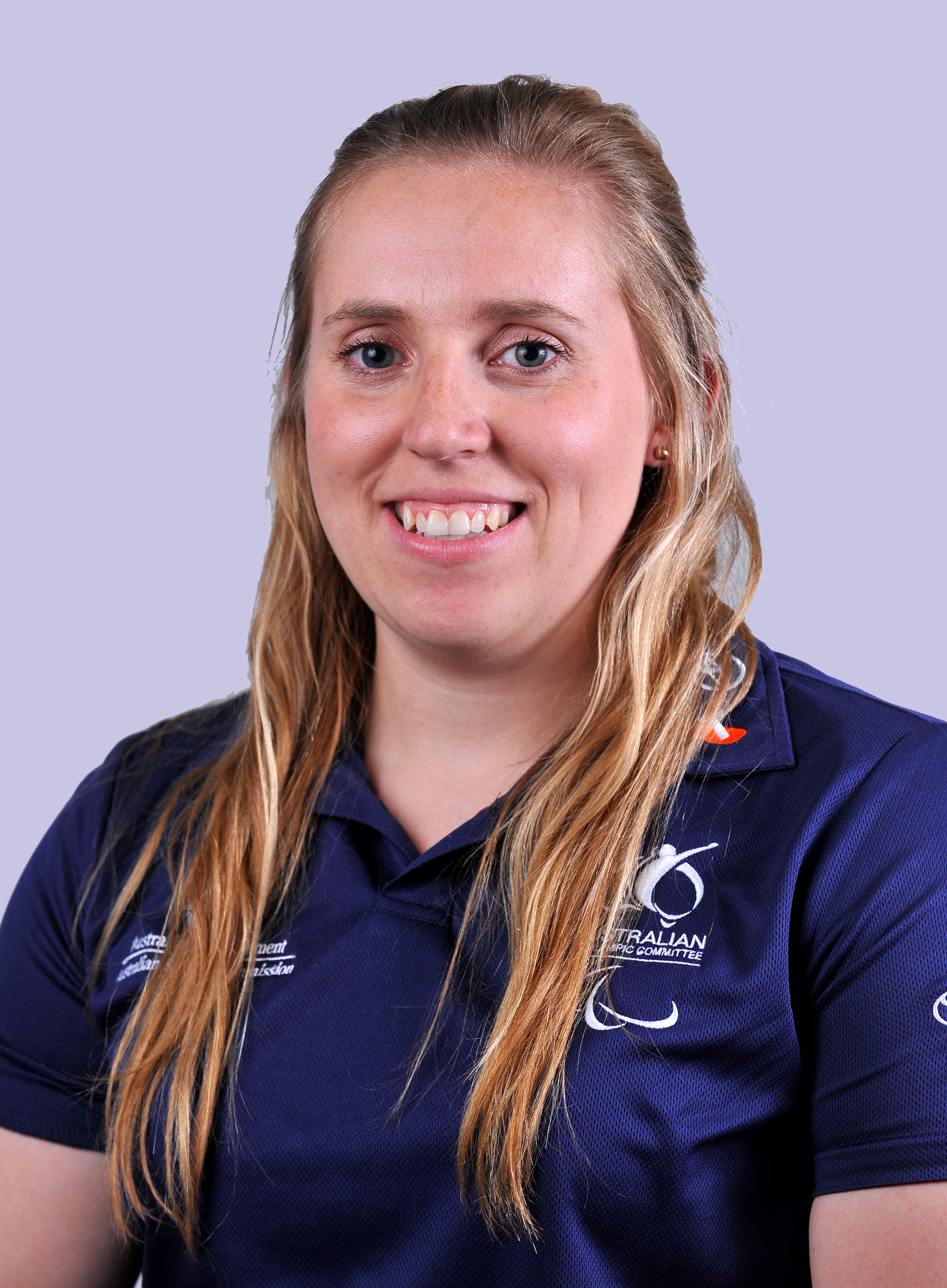
- 2012 Australian Paralympic team portrait of Chaplin

Personal information
- Nickname: Chappers
- Born: 4 September 1984 (age 42)

Sport
- Country: Australia
- Sport: Wheelchair basketball
- Disability class: 3.5
- Event: Women's team
- Club: Victoria
Medal record
Wheelchair basketball
Paralympic Games
Silver medal – second place	2004 Athens	Women's wheelchair basketball
Bronze medal – third place	2008 Beijing	Women's wheelchair basketball
Silver medal – second place	2012 London	Women's wheelchair basketball

Shelley Matheson (née Chaplin) (born 4 September 1984) is an Australian 3.5-point player wheelchair basketball player. She participated in the 2004 Summer Paralympics in Athens, where she won a silver medal; in the 2008 Summer Paralympics in Beijing, where she won a bronze medal, and the 2012 Summer Paralympics in London, where she won a second silver medal, a win she dedicated to her lifelong friend Shannon.

Chaplin began playing wheelchair basketball in 1999, after initially contemplating developing her archery skills, and made her debut in the Women's National Wheelchair Basketball League (WNWBL) in 2000. She was part of the WNWBL championship Dandenong Rangers sides in 2011 and 2012. She was first selected for the Australia women's national wheelchair basketball team, known as the Gliders, in 2001, and first represented Australia in 2002, winning a bronze medal as part of the team at the 2002 World Wheelchair Basketball Championship. She played for the University of Illinois Urbana-Champaign wheelchair basketball team, and was named an All-American in the 2006/07 season. Her team won the national championships in 2009.

== Personal life ==
An interview with Shelley Chaplin in January 2013.

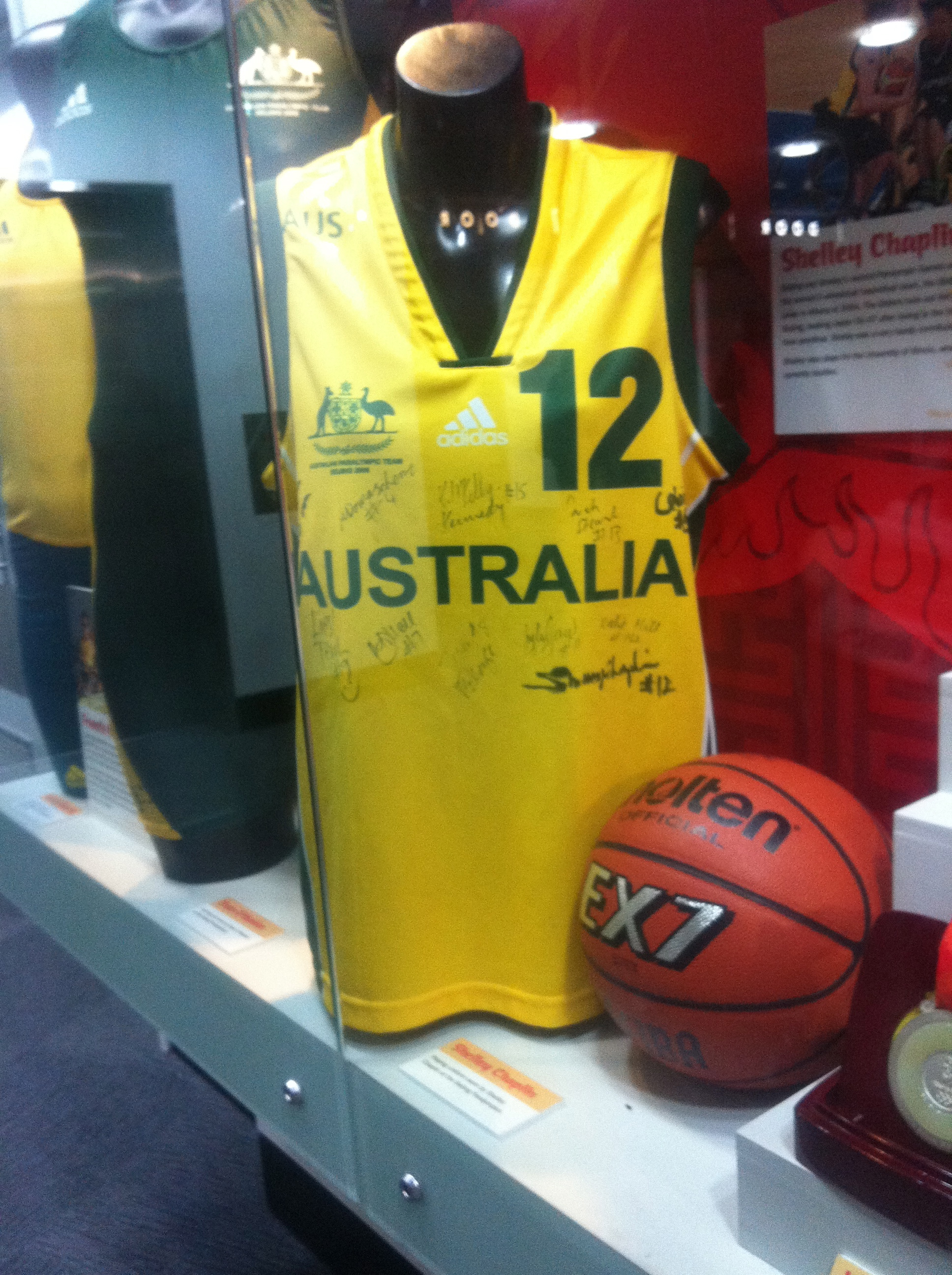
A Gliders guernsey that Chaplin wore at the 2008 Paralympics on display at the Australian Institute of Sport. It is signed by her teammates.

Nicknamed Chappers, Chaplin was born in Bendigo, Victoria, on 4 September 1984, with incomplete paraplegia. She grew up in Bendigo, and went to Girton Grammar School. In 2010, she graduated from the University of Illinois Urbana-Champaign with a Bachelor of Science degree in Recreation, Sport and Tourism.

After completing her studies at the University of Illinois Chaplin took up a position at Australian Broadcasting Corporation. At the ABC Chaplin was a Production Assistant on Adam Hills Tonight in 2013 and Spicks and Specks in 2014.

Chaplin is married Kieran Matheson and they have two children.

== Basketball ==
A 3.5-point player, Chaplin began playing wheelchair basketball in 1999. In financial year 2012/2013, the Australian Sports Commission gave her a A$20,000 grant as part of their Direct Athlete Support program. She received $20,000 in 2012/13, $17,000 in 2011/12 and 2010/11, $5,571.42 in 2009/10 and $5,200 in 2008/09.

=== Club ===
Chaplin made her debut in the Women's National Wheelchair Basketball League (WNWBL) in 2000 when she played for the Whittlesea Pacers. She played for the Dandenong Rangers in 2011 when her team won the WNWBL title, and in 2012 was the captain of the Victoria Dandenong Rangers. In a round four game against Sydney Uni Flames that the Rangers won 55–44, she scored 22 points. Her team qualified for the league finals, where she scored 16 points in the game against the Stacks Goudkamp Bears for her team to walk away as champions by a score of 77–54. That season, she was named the league's Most Valuable 3 Point Player and a member of the 2012 All Star Five.

=== University ===
Chaplin played for the University of Illinois Wheelchair Basketball team in the country's first division. In 2006/07, she was coached by Mike Frogley, and was the team's starting point guard. Early in the 2006/07 season, her wheelchair broke and she had to play in one that was not hers. After three games played in the borrowed chair, she had bloody and bruised knees. She was named an All-American in the 2006/07 season.

In two games that Chaplin's team won against RIC Express and the University of Alabama in December 2006, she scored 35 total points, made 13 rebounds and 7 assists. She was named the Most Valuable Player (MVP) of the series. Her team finished that series with a record of 10–0. In a January 2009 game against 7th ranked Alabama that her team won 52–47, she scored 22 points. The game was part of a tournament where her team also defeated Oklahoma State University 53–49, and the University of Missouri, 48–27. That season, her team won the national championships after defeating the Phoenix Mercury 53–36 in the championship game.

In 2007/08, Chaplin's team won the national championship and she was named the tournament's MVP. In the team's 44–43 victory over the University of Alabama, she scored 12 points. That year, she was a junior and played point guard for the team. Her team played against a number of men's teams during that season. In January 2008, the team lost three games to men's teams, including a 61–41 loss to Southwest Minnesota State where she scored 14 points, a 54–35 loss to Edinboro where she scored 10 points in a 74–20 loss to Wisconsin-Whitewater. In April 2010, Chaplin was named the First Team All-Tournament at the national championships. For the 2009/10 season, she was also named the University of Illinois Women's Wheelchair Basketball Player of the Year.

=== National team ===
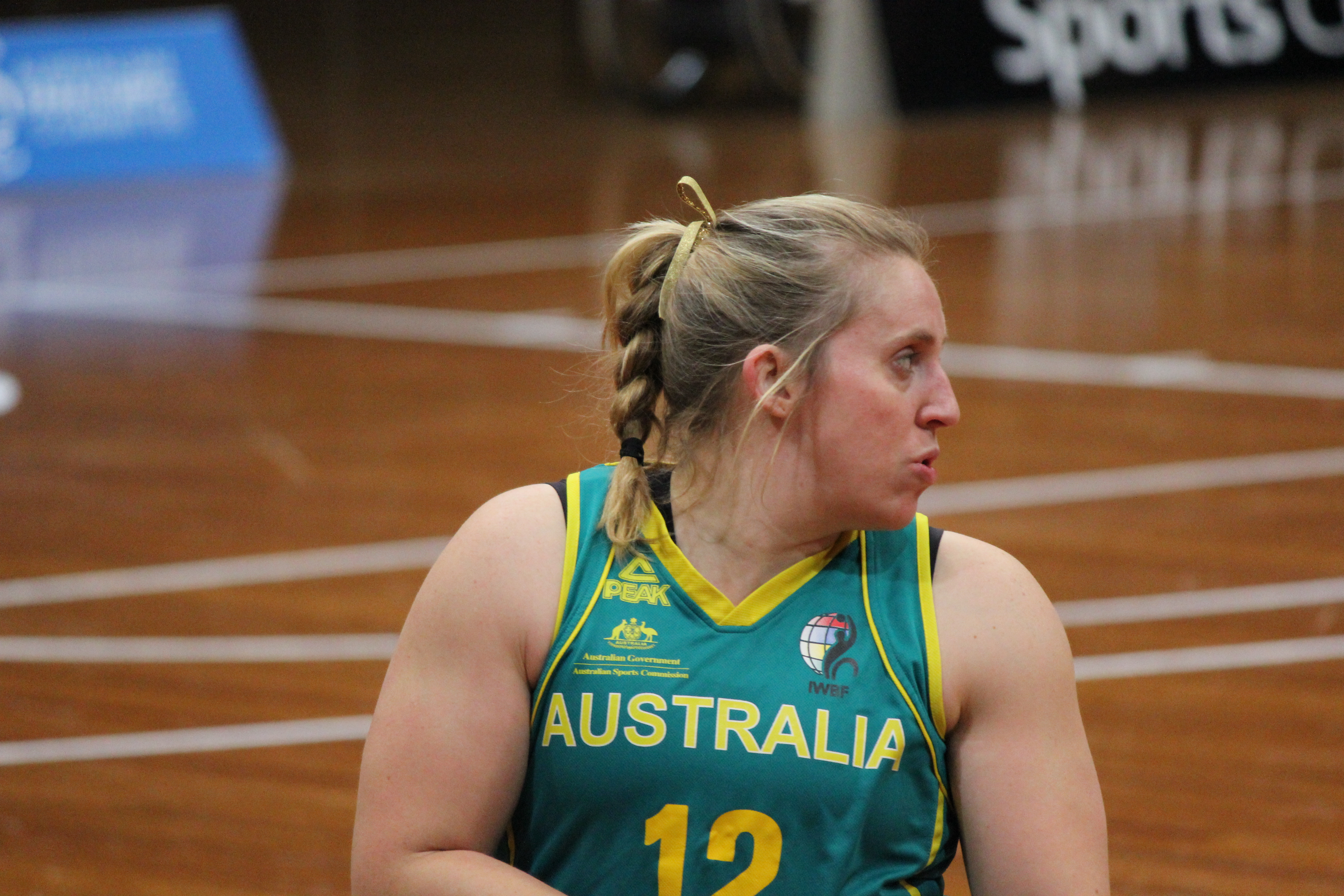
Chaplin at a 2012 game in Sydney

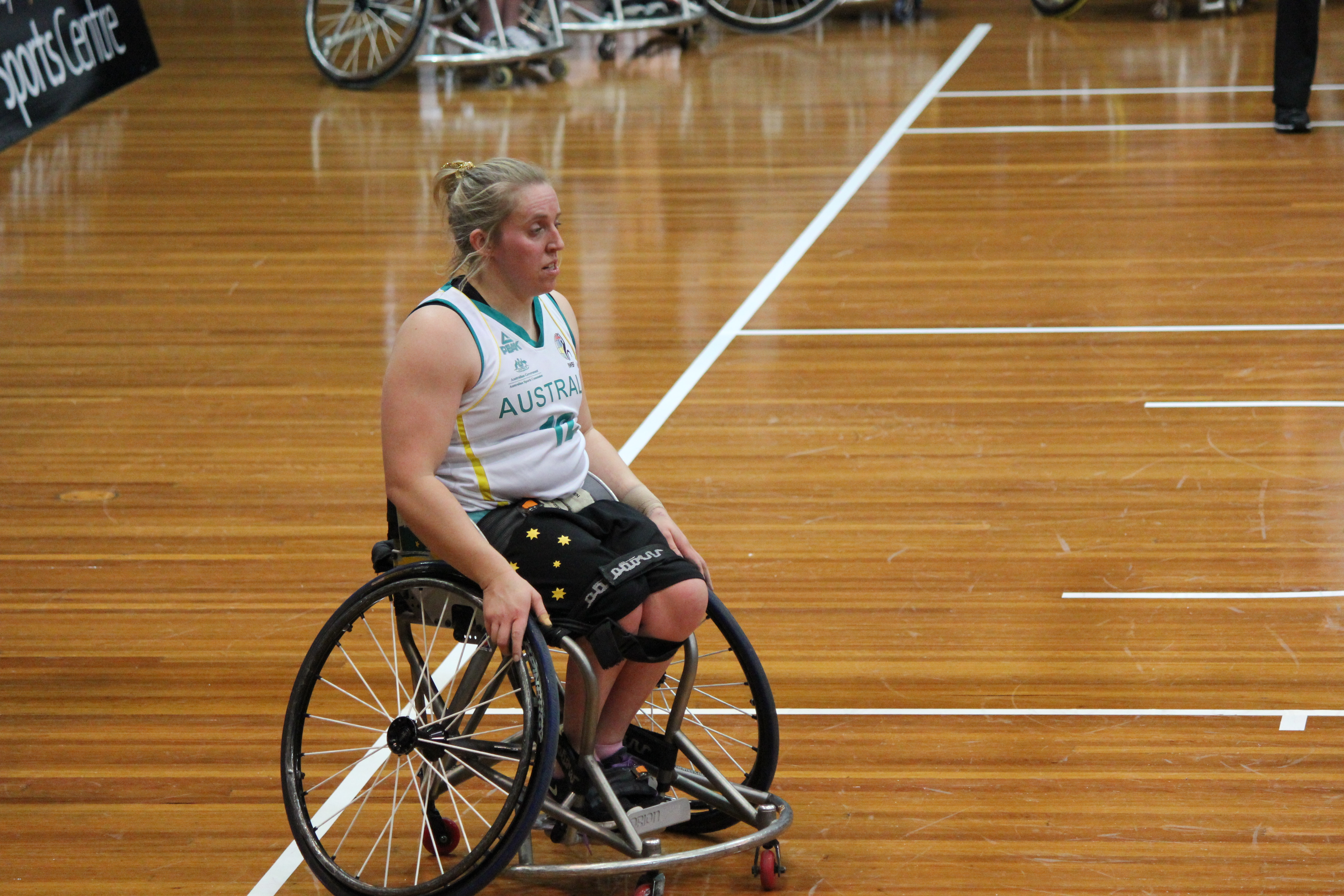
Chaplin at a 2012 game in Sydney

Chaplin was first selected for the Australia women's national wheelchair basketball team, known as the Gliders, in 2001, and first represented Australia in 2002, winning a bronze medal as part of the team at the 2002 World Wheelchair Basketball Championship.

Chaplin was part of the Gliders team at the 2010 IWBF World Championships where her team came fourth, and the team that won the Osaka Cup in Japan in 2008, 2009 and 2010. In February 2013, she was captain of the Gliders at the Osaka Cup, where the Gliders successfully defended the title they had won in 2012. Chaplin was named MVP of the tournament.

After five years absence and the birth of two children, Matheson was selected to play for the Gliders in qualification tournaments for the 2024 Paris Paralympics.

=== Paralympics ===
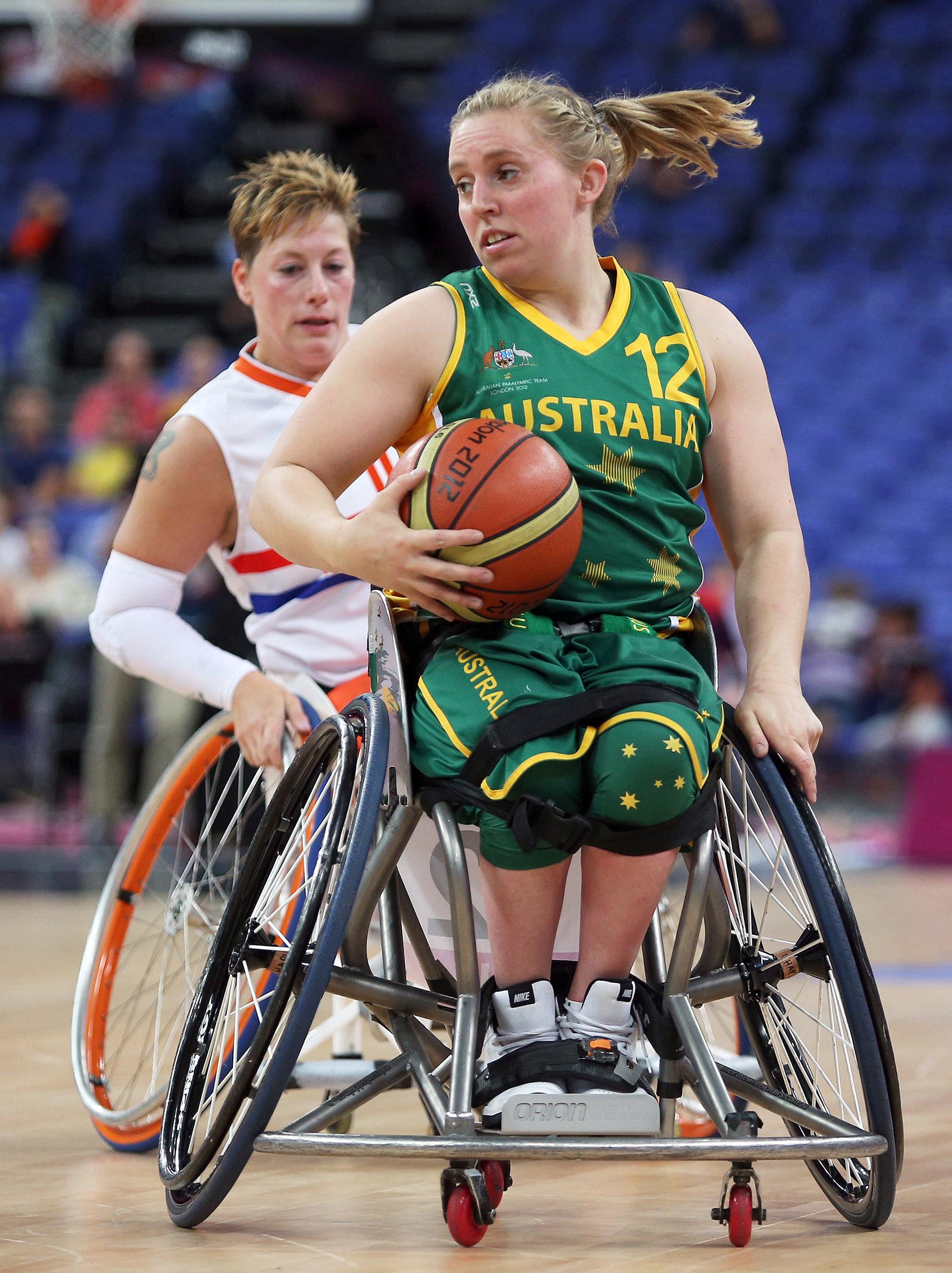
Chaplin at the 2012 London Paralympics

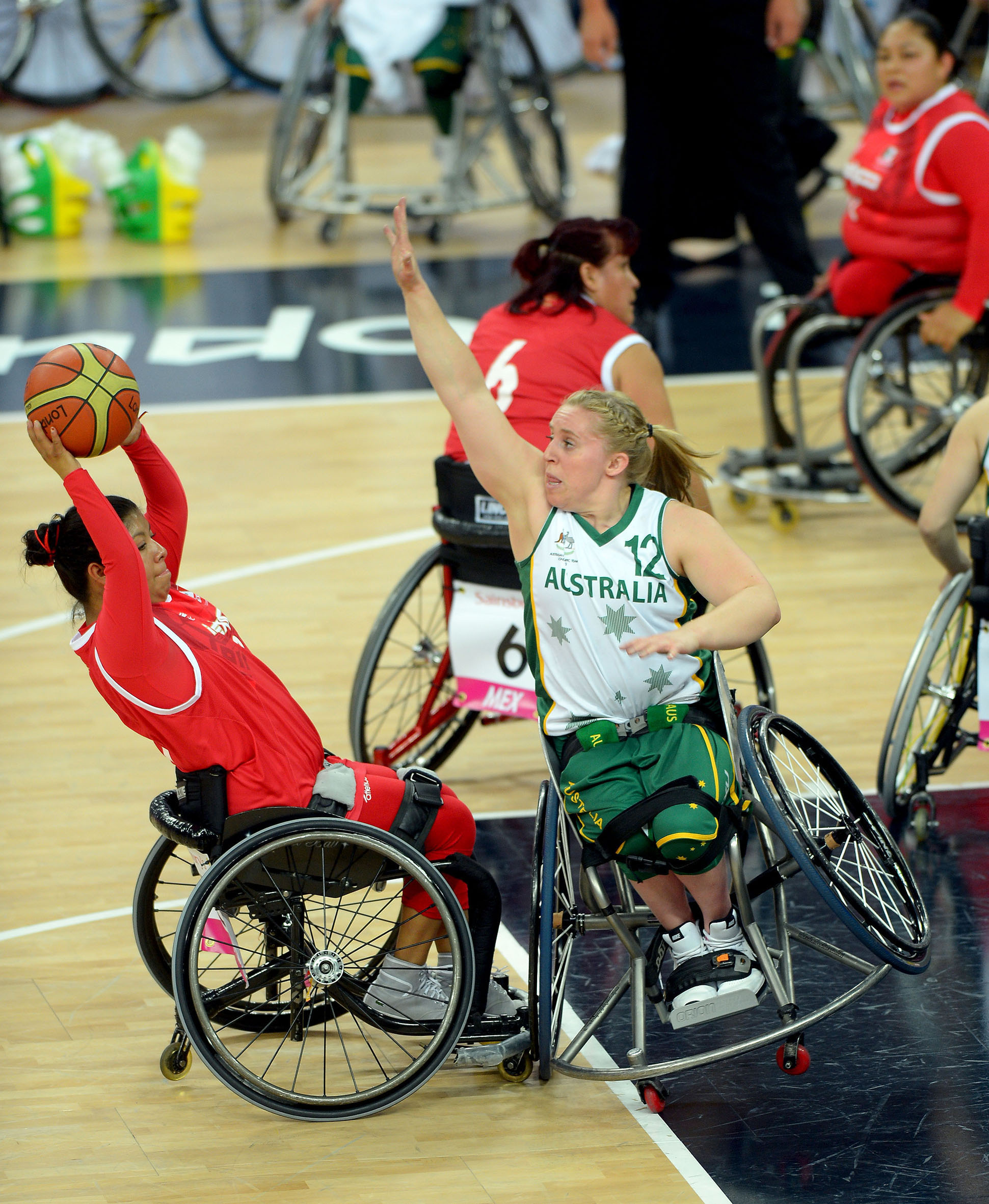
Chaplin at the 2012 London Paralympics

Chaplin was part of the Gliders at the 2004 Athens, 2008 Beijing, and 2012 London Paralympics, and won two silver medals, in 2004 and 2012, and a bronze medal in 2008 as part of the team.

Chaplin competed with the Gliders at the 2012 Summer Paralympics.In the group stage, the Australia women's national wheelchair basketball team at the 2012 Summer Paralympics posted wins against Brazil, Great Britain, and the Netherlands, but lost to the Canada. This was enough to advance the Gliders to the quarter-finals, where they beat Mexico. The Gliders then defeated the United States by a point to set up a final clash with Germany. In the gold medal game, the Gliders lost 44–58, and earned a silver medal. She scored 8 points in the game, in which she played 26:58 minutes.

== Statistics ==
Season statistics
Competition	Season	Matches	FGM–FGA	FG%	3FGM–3FGA	3FG%	FTM–FTA	FT%	TOT	AST	PTS
WNWBL	2013	16	113–243	46.5	0–3	0	18–46	39.1	7.1	6.3	15.3
WNWBL	2012	14	81–208	38.9	0–8	0	10–22	45.5	5.7	8.1	12.5
WNWBL	2011	18	120–233	51.5	0–1	0	24–71	33.8	5.3	7.6	14.7
WNWBL	2010	5	32–74	43.2	0–0	0	5–9	55.6	3.2	4.4	13.8
WNWBL	2009	6	54–126	42.9	0–2	0	16–38	42.1	8.3	3.7	20.7

Key
FGM, FGA, FG%: field goals made, attempted and percentage
3FGM, 3FGA, 3FG%: three-point field goals made, attempted and percentage
FTM, FTA, FT%: free throws made, attempted and percentage
PTS: points, average per game
TOT: turnovers average per game
AST: assists average per game
