= University of Illinois Wheelchair Basketball =

Illinois Fighting Illini wheelchair basketball
- Nickname: Fighting Illini
- Leagues: National Wheelchair Basketball Association
- Founded: 1948 (men's); 1970 (women's)
- Arena: Activities and Recreation Center
- Location: Champaign, Illinois
- Team colors: Blue and orange
- Head coach: Jacob Tyree (men's) (United States) Stephanie Wheeler (women's)
- Championships: Men's National Championships (15); Women's National Championships (14)
- Website: illinoiswheelchairbasketball.com/
Home	Away

The University of Illinois Wheelchair Basketball teams are the oldest teams of their kind in the United States.

== History ==
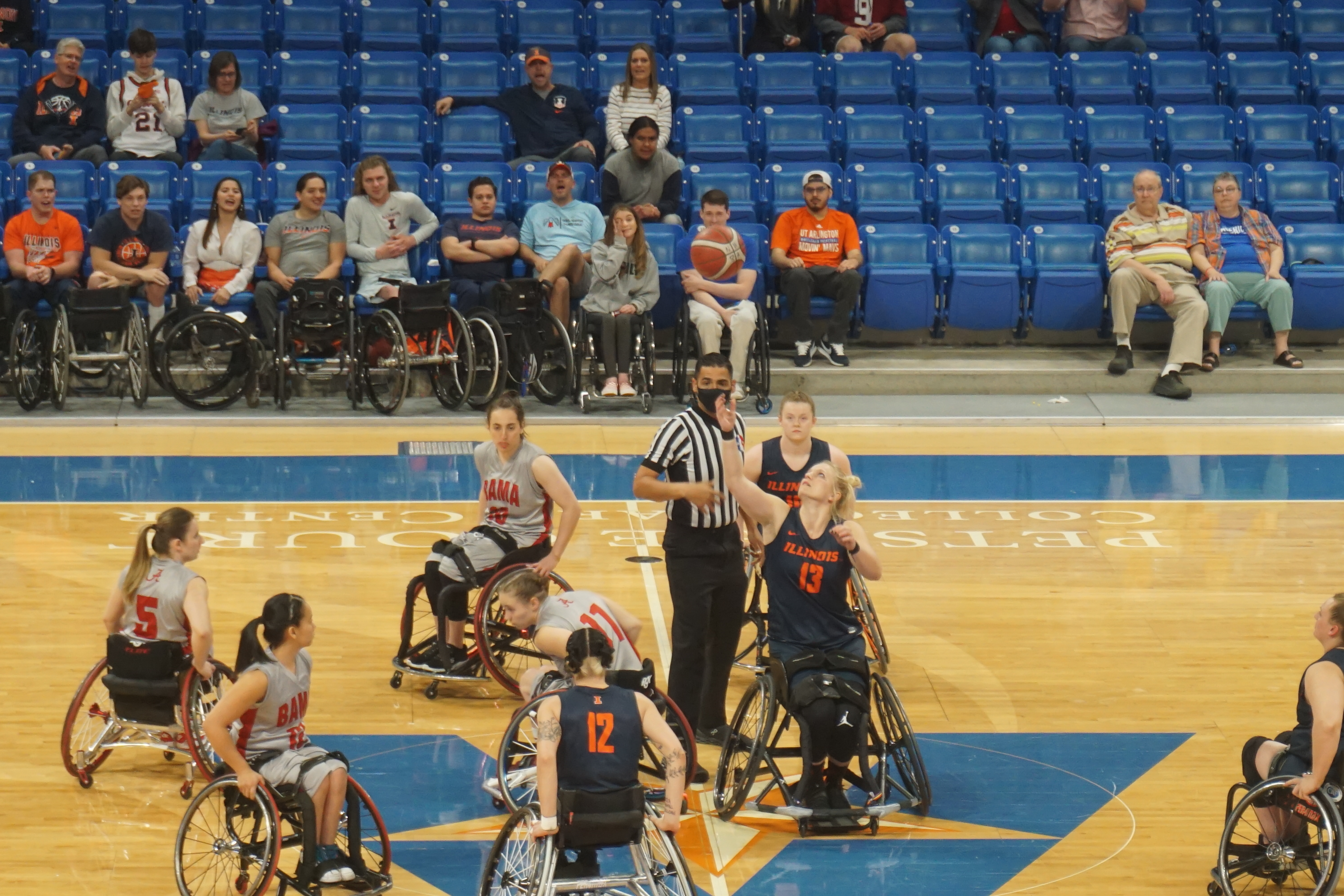
Women's team playing the Alabama Crimson Tide in the 2022 National Intercollegiate Wheelchair Basketball Tournament Women's Championship

In 1948 the University of Illinois was the first college in the United States to establish a collegiate wheelchair basketball team, the University of Illinois Gizz Kids. Under the management and coaching of Dr. Timothy Nugent the U of I wheelchair basketball team held the first National Wheelchair Basketball Tournament in April 1949. Later in 1970, the University of Illinois formed the Ms. Kids, the first women’s wheelchair basketball team in country. After twenty nine years of wheelchair basketball, the university hosted the First Intercollegiate Wheelchair Basketball Tournament. Since then, the University of Illinois has hosted a number of Intercollegiate Wheelchair Basketball Tournaments claiming a total of 29 national championships between the men and women’s teams with the men holding 15 titles and the women 14 respectively. Today, the men’s team is led by head coach Jacob Tyree, and the women’s head coach Stephanie Wheeler.

== Camps ==
The University of Illinois annually hosts two camps in the summer. Premier Camp is a wheelchair basketball skills camp that is designed for experienced wheelchair basketball athletes who are looking to enhance their abilities on the court as they transition from the Junior Wheelchair Basketball Division into the Intercollegiate Wheelchair Basketball Division. Individual Camp is for athletes who are looking to learn basic wheelchair basketball skills that are the fundamentals at every level of competition.
