= Wheelchair basketball in the United States =

Wheelchair basketball in the United States is governed by the National Wheelchair Basketball Association (NWBA). The International Wheelchair Basketball Federation (IWBF), and the US Olympic Committee recognize the NWBA as the official national organization. Internationally, both the men's and women's national teams participate in Paralympic and World Championships as well as regional tournaments.

== Divisions ==
There are currently eight divisions in domestic wheelchair basketball competition in the US.

=== Junior Prep ===
This division is for children aged 13 and younger. This is the only division where an aspect of the court is altered, the basket is lowered to 8.5 ft.

=== Junior (Varsity) ===
This division is for children ages 13 to 18, and they must be enrolled in school. There are no alterations to the court for this division.

=== Division III ===
This division is for adult teams and allows newer players and newer or lesser developed teams the ability to play at a developmental or recreational level. New adult teams begin in this division. As they compete, they have opportunities to advance to Division II.

=== Division II ===
This division is for adult teams and allows experienced and more developed players and teams to play mid-level competition. Teams in this division have opportunities for promotion to Division I.

=== Division I ===
This division is for adult teams. Formerly known as Championship Division, it allows elite level and experienced individuals and teams to play at the highest level of domestic competition.

=== Intercollegiate Men's ===
This division is for men attending a University that has a sponsored team. Intercollegiate Division features collegiate athletes promoting their schools through wheelchair basketball. Some of the most enthusiastic crowds can be found at these games.

=== Intercollegiate Women's ===
This division is for women attending a university that has a sponsored team. Most of the time, but not always, a college that has a women's wheelchair basketball team also has a men's wheelchair team. The Intercollegiate Women's Division features some of the best college level women athletes. The ball used is the standard women's size basketball.

=== Women's ===
This division is for women aged 15 and older. The Women's Division features a number of community teams solely developed for the women's game. The ball used is the standard women's size basketball.

== International competition ==
=== Men ===
The United States men's national wheelchair basketball team has participated in the Summer Paralympic Games since the first edition in 1960. As of the 2016 Summer Paralympics they have won six gold, one silver and three bronze medals. The team also competes internationally in the IWBF World Wheelchair Basketball Championships, the Parapan American Games, and in the IWBF U23 World Wheelchair Basketball Championships.

=== Women ===
As of the 2016 Summer Paralympics the United States women's national wheelchair basketball team have won four gold, one silver and three bronze medals. As of the 2014 edition, the team's record at World Championships is two gold and four silver medals.
