= Lee Williams (basketball) =

American basketball coach and executive

Biographical details
- Born: June 27, 1918; Oswego, New York, U.S.
- Died: June 11, 1997 (aged 78); Colorado Springs, Colorado, U.S.

Playing career
- 1937–1940: Cortland State

Coaching career (HC unless noted)
- 1941–1943: Great Lakes Navy (asst.)
- 1943–1944: Dartmouth (asst.)
- 1944–1945: Isla Grande Navy
- 1945–1946: Merchant Marine (asst.)
- 1946–1965: Colby

Administrative career (AD unless noted)
- 1952–1965: Colby

Head coaching record
- Overall: 252–212

Leon Palmer "Lee" Williams (June 27, 1918 – June 11, 1997) was an American basketball coach and athletics administrator. He coached at Colby College from 1946 to 1965, and was the executive director of the Naismith Memorial Basketball Hall of Fame from 1966 to 1985.

== Biography ==
Williams graduated from Owego Free Academy and Cortland State Teachers College and played three seasons of varsity basketball at each school. In 1941, he became a teacher and coach at Geneseo High School. He enlisted in the United States Navy later that year and was assigned to the physical education program. He was sent to Naval Station Great Lakes, where he was the pitching coach for Mickey Cochrane's baseball team and an assistant coach for the base's basketball team, which won 34 of 37 games while Williams was on the staff. In 1943, he was sent to Dartmouth College as part of the V-12 Navy College Training Program. He was an assistant coach of the Dartmouth Big Green men's basketball team under Earl Brown. The following year, he was transferred to Naval Air Station Isla Grande in San Juan, Puerto Rico, where he was the base's athletic officer and coach of its baseball and basketball teams. He was discharged on September 23, 1945 and joined Brown as an assistant basketball coach at the United States Merchant Marine Academy.

In 1946, Williams was appointed head basketball coach at Colby College. In his 19 seasons with the team, he amassed a 252–212 record and won ten Maine Intercollegiate Athletic Association championships. He became the school's athletic director in 1952, but continued to coach. In 1954, he served as Colby's baseball coach after Eddie Roundy suffered a heart attack shortly before the season began.

Williams went on sabbatical in 1965. He did not return to the school, instead accepting the position of executive director of the Naismith Basketball Hall of Fame, in July 1966. Under his leadership, the Hall of Fame completed construction of its first facility and opened on February 17, 1968. He was a driving force behind the construction of the Hall's second building, which opened shortly after his retirement in June 1985.

== Honors ==
In 1985, Williams received the Naismith Memorial Basketball Hall of Fame's John Bunn Award for his contributions to the sport of basketball. In 1991, he was inducted into the Maine Sports Hall of Fame. In 1997, he received the Carl Nelson Sports Achievement Award, an annual award given to a member of the Colby community for distinguished achievement in athletics.

== Later life and death ==
Williams retired to Colorado Springs, Colorado. He died in a hospice care facility there on June 11, 1997.
