= William Reid (basketball) =

American basketball player, coach, and administrator

William A. Reid (September 26, 1893 – October 10, 1955) was an American basketball coach and administrator born in Detroit, Michigan.

As a high school player in Adrian, Michigan he led his Adrian High School team to a 1912 state title in basketball and then played in two sports in Colgate University. He returned to Colgate as a basketball coach and coached the Raiders from 1919 to 1928 with a record of 135–52. Beginning in 1936, he served as Colgate's director of athletics for 20 years.

Reid was a president of Eastern College Athletic Conference (ECAC) from 1944 to 1945 and vice-president of the National Collegiate Athletic Association (NCAA) from 1942 to 1946. He was enshrined in the Basketball Hall of Fame in 1963.
