= Harry Vines =

Harry Doyle Vines (September 12, 1938 – February 11, 2006) was a prominent member of the wheelchair basketball community, winning national and international championships. Born in Caldwell, Arkansas and later residing in Sherwood, Arkansas, he served on several commissions and boards, including the Governor's Commission on People with Disabilities and the Arkansas Community Service Commission.

== Early life ==
Harry Vines was born in Caldwell, Arkansas. He was a member of the Little Rock Central High School Tigers, leading the team to a Big 8 championship and earned a high school All American award in 1957. He played at Oklahoma City University, and upon graduation from OCU in 1961 became a basketball coach at Southwest Junior High in Little Rock.

== Collegiate career ==
Vines played college basketball at Oklahoma City University from the 1958–59 to 1960–61 seasons.

== Wheelchair basketball ==
Vines graduated from Oklahoma City University in 1961, and became the basketball coach at Southwestern Junior High in Little Rock. In 1978, he began coaching a new wheelchair basketball team - the Arkansas Rollin' Razorbacks of the National Wheelchair Basketball Association (NWBA). Over the next 22 years, Vines led his team to 21 winning seasons. He coached the Rollin' Razorbacks to five national championships (1991, 1993, 1994, 1996 and 2000). Vines later coached US national teams in the World Cup and Paralympics.

In 1987, Harry coached the United States team in World Wheelchair Games (formerly known as the Stoke Mandeville Games) to its first world championship. In 1990, President George H. W. Bush awarded him with the President's Service Award (later known as the President's Community Service Award) for his outstanding volunteer contributions as a coach.

Harry had served the NWBA as Conference Commissioner of the Arkansas Valley Conference, 1st Vice President of the NWBA and President of the NWBA. In recent years, he was the NWBA representative on the board of directors to USA Basketball. Vines was inducted in the NWBA's Hall of Fame in 2001 and the Arkansas Sports Hall of Fame in 2014.
