= Michael Goldberg (sports executive) =

Michael Goldberg (March 16, 1943 – January 20, 2017) was executive director of the National Basketball Coaches Association in the United States for more than 30 years. He began as the general counsel of the fledgling American Basketball Association in 1974 and later helped engineer the merger of the National Basketball Association and American Basketball Association in 1976. He became the executive director of NBCA in 1980 and was credited with improving the retirement and insurance plans of coaches.

The Basketball Hall of Fame announced it would be giving the John W. Bunn Lifetime Achievement Award to him in 2017. The NBCA announced that they would be creating a coach-of-the-year award, which would be named for Goldberg.

He was known for preferring to wear a bow tie, and after his death in 2017, a number of NBA coaches wore bow ties during games in his honor.

In 1981, he founded and continued to be CEO of a sports marketing company, National Media Group. He claimed to be responsible for getting the face of gymnast Mary Lou Retton, one of his clients, on the front of a Wheaties cereal box.

He is a graduate of New York University and the St. John’s University School of Law.
