= Marty Blake =

American basketball executive (1927–2013)

Marty Blake (March 22, 1927 – April 7, 2013) was a general manager of the Atlanta Hawks franchise, and the NBA's longtime Director of Scouting. He was a recipient of the Basketball Hall of Fame's John Bunn Award.

== Life ==
Born in Paterson, New Jersey in 1927, the son of two Russian Jewish immigrants, Blake served in the US Army at the end of World War II and attended Wilkes College in Wilkes-Barre, Pennsylvania. He spent his early career promoting local boxing matches, stock car races, and baseball games. He later worked for several professional baseball and football teams, and helping to found the Continental Basketball Association.

Blake became manager of the Hawks in 1954, when the team was based in Milwaukee. From 1954 to 1970, Blake guided the team to seven division titles and one NBA championship (1958). One of Blake's most notable player acquisitions for the Hawks was Lenny Wilkens, a point guard from Providence College whom Blake had watched in the 1960 National Invitation Tournament. Blake selected Wilkens with the seventh pick of the 1960 NBA draft, and Wilkens went on to have a Hall of Fame career as a player and a coach.

At the 1970 NBA draft, Blake became the first general manager in NBA history to select a player from a foreign league by drafting Mexico's Manuel Raga in the 10th round. Blake followed that selection with Italy's Dino Meneghin in the 11th round. Neither player ever signed with the Hawks, since the team could not afford to buy out their contracts, but the draft selections set the stage for the later influx of global talent into the NBA.

In 1970, Blake left the Hawks to become president of the Pittsburgh Condors, a team in the rival American Basketball Association. He spent one season with them before founding his own basketball scouting service, Marty Blake and Associates.

When the ABA-NBA merger occurred in 1976, Blake was named NBA Director of Scouting Services. Blake and his associates were credited with discovering such players as Jack Sikma, Terry Porter, Dennis Rodman, Scottie Pippen, Tim Hardaway, Ben Wallace, Karl Malone, and Joe Dumars. Official NBA publications referred to Blake as the "Godfather of the NBA Draft" because of his ability to identify skilled players at smaller colleges.

In 2005, Blake received the Bunn Lifetime Achievement Award from the Basketball Hall of Fame, the hall's most prestigious honor outside of enshrinement. He once maintained a blog at NBA.com called "On the Road with Marty Blake." Blake died in suburban Atlanta in 2013.
