= Statue of Tom Jernstedt =

Outdoor sculpture in Indianapolis, Indiana, U.S.

- The statue at night, 2024
- Medium: Bronze sculpture
- Subject: Tom Jernstedt
- Location: Indianapolis, Indiana, U.S.; 39°45′51.5″N 86°9′35.4″W

A life-sized bronze statue of Tom Jernstedt is installed at the corner of Georgia and Illinois streets in Indianapolis, Indiana, United States. Indianapolis mayor Joe Hogsett and NCAA president Charlie Baker attended the unveiling ceremony on April 21, 2023.

== See also ==
- List of public art in Indianapolis
