= Joe Vancisin =

American basketball coach (1922–2021)

Biographical details
- Born: June 4, 1922; Bridgeport, Connecticut, U.S.
- Died: March 23, 2021 (aged 98); Atlanta, Georgia, U.S.

Playing career
- 1943–1944: Dartmouth

Coaching career (HC unless noted)
- 1944–1945: Dartmouth (freshmen)
- 1947–1948: Michigan (assistant)
- 1948–1956: Minnesota (assistant)
- 1956–1975: Yale

Head coaching record
- Overall: 206–242

Accomplishments and honors

Awards
- John Bunn Award (1993)
- College Basketball Hall of Fame; Inducted in 2011

Joseph Richard Vancisin (June 4, 1922 – March 23, 2021) was an American basketball coach and executive. He coached at Yale University from 1956 to 1975, and later was the executive director of the National Association of Basketball Coaches from 1975 to 1992. He is a member of the College Basketball Hall of Fame. In 1993, he received the John Bunn Award. Vancisin died in Atlanta, Georgia, in March 2021 at the age of 98.

== Early life ==
Born in Bridgeport on June 4, 1922, Vancisin attended Bassick High School, where he played and lettered in basketball and baseball in 1939 and 1940. In his senior season, Vancisin was the captain of the state and New England Championship team as well as being selected to the All State and All New England High school teams in addition to being recognized as the Outstanding High School Player in the state of Connecticut.

== Playing career and military service ==
After graduating from Bassick High School in 1940, Vancisin attended Dartmouth College, where he played basketball and baseball. He was selected captain of the Dartmouth freshman basketball team and lettered in both basketball and baseball during the 1940 and 1944 seasons, and sat out his sophomore and junior year seasons due to illness. Vancisin was the starting guard on the Dartmouth Eastern Intercollegiate Championship team in 1944 and played on the runner-up NCAA team which lost to Utah 44–42 in overtime.

Following his graduation from Dartmouth College in 1944 with a Bachelor of Arts degree, Vancisin began coaching basketball in the service and with several teams in the Big Ten Conference and in the Ivy League. Following his coaching apprenticeship with the Dartmouth freshman team in 1945, Vancisin was stationed in Washington, D.C. as a corporal for the United States Air Force Strategic Air Command Basketball Championship before he moved on to collegiate coaching.

== Postwar career ==
Vancisin assisted the University of Michigan basketball team, with Ozzie Cowles, in 1948 to a Big Ten Championship and spent the next seven seasons (1949 to 1956) with the University of Minnesota basketball program and received his Masters of Arts in Education in 1955. He aided the Golden Gophers to a Big Ten and NCAA baseball championship in 1955 before his move to Yale University as head coach of the Yale Bulldogs men's basketball hoop team for 19 years from 1956 to 1975. During his tenure, Vancisin's squad won two Ivy League championships during the 1956–57 season and the 1962–63 season. He claimed 207 victories while at Yale. As the freshman gold coach at Yale University for 14 seasons, he claimed a record of 72–25–1. The Bulldogs captured the 1969 Rainbow Classic in Hawaii, knocking off Pete Maravich's LSU team in the championship game. Vancisin helped develop Yale stars John Lee, Rick Kaminsky (both All-Americans), Larry Downs, Bill Madden, Ed Goldstone, Rick Stoner and Jim Morgan.

Vancisin traveled and gave clinics around the world and was a member of two American Olympic basketball staffs. For his basketball accomplishments, Vancisin earned a spot on the 1976 Olympic gold medal-winning basketball staff with University of North Carolina coach Dean Smith in 1976 and a member of the Olympic Staff in 1980, coached by Dave Gavitt.

Vancisin was an active member of the National Association of Basketball Coaches NABC, served on the board of directors and was the NABC president in 1974. He succeeded Bill Wall as NABC executive director in 1975 and was the recipient of the John Bunn Award from the Naismith Memorial Basketball Hall of Fame in 1993. Under his leadership, the NABC debuted its college all-star game at the NCAA Final Four, elected its first African-American president in Georgetown's John Thompson (basketball), and adopted a code of ethics.
