= Bertha Teague =

American basketball coach

Bertha F. Teague (September 17, 1906 – June 13, 1991) was an American basketball coach, born in Carthage, Missouri, USA. She coached the Byng High School girls' team in Byng, Oklahoma (near Ada, Oklahoma) for 42 years (from 1927 to 1969) with a career record of 1,157-115 (.910 winning percentage). Her teams won 8 Oklahoma state titles and 98 consecutive games from 1936 to 1939. She was named Coach of the Decade for 1930s, 1940s and 1970s by the Jim Thorpe Athletic Awards Committee in 1974. She was enshrined as a coach in the Basketball Hall of Fame in 1985 and in the Women's Basketball Hall of Fame in 1999.
