= NCAA tournament =

NCAA tournament may refer to a number of tournaments organized by the National Collegiate Athletic Association:

== Men's sports ==
- NCAA Division I men's basketball tournament, the most common usage of this term
- NCAA Division II men's basketball tournament, established in 1957, previously the College Division
- NCAA Division III men's basketball tournament
- NCAA Division I Baseball Championship, more often called by the name of its eight-team final round, the College World Series
- College Football Playoff National Championship, NCAA Division I Football Bowl Subdivision (FBS)
- NCAA Division I Football Championship, NCAA Division I Football Championship Subdivision (FCS)
- NCAA Division II Football Championship, began in 1973
- NCAA Division III Football Championship, began in 1973
- NCAA Men's Ice Hockey Championship, tournament determines the top men's ice hockey team in NCAA Division I and Division III
- NCAA Men's Lacrosse Championship, tournament determines the top men's field lacrosse team in the NCAA Division I, Division II, and Division III
- NCAA Division I Men's Soccer Championship, the semifinal and final rounds of which are known as the "College Cup"
- NCAA Division II Men's Soccer Championship
- NCAA Division III Men's Soccer Championship
- NCAA Division I Men's Swimming and Diving Championships
- NCAA Men's Tennis Championship, held to crown a team, individual, and doubles champion in American college tennis
- NCAA Men's National Collegiate Volleyball Championship
- NCAA Division III Men's Volleyball Championship, launched in 2012

== Women's sports ==
- NCAA Division I women's basketball tournament, an annual college basketball tournament for women
- NCAA Division II women's basketball tournament
- NCAA Division III women's basketball tournament
- NCAA Women's Ice Hockey Tournament
- NCAA Women's Lacrosse Championship, tournament determines the top women's lacrosse team in the NCAA Division I, Division II, and Division III
- NCAA Division I women's soccer tournament, 1982–present
- NCAA Division II women's soccer tournament, 1988–present
- NCAA Division III women's soccer tournament, 1986–present
- NCAA Division I softball tournament, more often called by the name of its eight-team final round, the Women's College World Series
- NCAA Division I Women's Swimming and Diving Championships
- NCAA Women's Tennis Championship, to determine the Team Championships, Singles Championships, and Doubles Championships in Women's Tennis
- NCAA Women's Volleyball Championship

== See also ==
- NCAA basketball tournament (disambiguation)
- NCAA (Philippines) Championships, championships within NCAA (Philippines)
