= Timothy Nugent =

- Born: January 10, 1923
- Died: November 11, 2015 (aged 92)
- Education: Tarleton State University; University of Wisconsin–La Crosse; University of Wisconsin–Madison

Timothy Nugent (January 10, 1923- November 11, 2015), also known as the "Father of Accessibility," founded the first comprehensive program of higher education for individuals with disabilities in 1948. He served as professor of rehabilitation education and director of the Rehabilitation Education Center and the Division of Rehabilitation Education Services (DRES) at the University of Illinois. He retired in 1985. He founded the National Wheelchair Basketball Association in 1949 and served as commissioner for the first 25 years. He also founded Delta Sigma Omicron, a national rehabilitation service fraternity. He was president of the National Paraplegia Foundation (now National Spinal Cord Injury Association) for four terms. He has been an international lecturer and consultant, as well as an advocate, publisher, and researcher on behalf of people with disabilities. He was a leader in the development of architectural accessibility standards, public transportation, adaptive equipment, and recreation activities for people with disabilities. He has been and continues to be active in many professional organizations, including the American National Standards Institute, the Illinois State Legislative Commission on the Hospitalization of Spinal Cord Injured, the Committee on Technical Aids, Housing and Transportation of Rehabilitation International, and the Institute for the Advancement of Prosthetics.

== Early life and education ==
Timothy Nugent was born January 10, 1923. He holds degrees from Tarleton State University, Texas; University of Wisconsin at LaCrosse, Wisconsin; and the University of Wisconsin at Madison, Wisconsin. He also has honorary degrees from Springfield College in Massachusetts, Mount Mary College in Wisconsin, and the University of Illinois at Urbana-Champaign.

== Career ==
Timothy Nugent's work was committed to making the educational benefits of the GI Bill available to all veterans.

=== Innovations ===
Nugent founded the first, and for many years the only, comprehensive program of disability services in higher education. By refusing to abandon his vision for veterans with disabilities, Nugent made the University of Illinois an institution of firsts: the first curb cuts, the first buses equipped with wheelchair lifts, and research that developed architectural accessibility standards that were later adopted nationally. He also created a comprehensive program of adapted sports for students with disabilities, leading to the founding of the National Wheelchair Basketball Association. He served as commissioner of the association for 25 years. Nugent also founded Delta Sigma Omicron, the first rehabilitation service fraternity.

=== Wheelchair basketball ===
In 1948 the University of Illinois was the first college in the United States to establish a collegiate wheelchair basketball team, the University of Illinois Wheelchair Basketball's Gizz Kids. Under the management and coaching of Nugent, the U of I wheelchair basketball team held the first National Wheelchair Basketball Tournament in April 1949. Later in 1970, the University of Illinois formed the Ms. Kids, the first women's wheelchair basketball team in country.

=== Awards and honors ===
In 2019, Nugent was inducted into the United States Olympic & Paralympic Hall of Fame as a "special" contributor, the only one to have such an honor.
