= National Wheelchair Basketball Association =

American wheelchair basketball league

- Sport: Wheelchair basketball
- Founded: 1949
- No. of teams: 181
- Country: United States
- Most recent champion: Determined at Nationals at the end of every season
- Website: nwba.org

National Wheelchair Basketball Association (NWBA) is composed of 181 wheelchair basketball teams within twenty-two conferences. Founded in 1949 by Timothy Nugent, the NWBA today consists of men's, women's, intercollegiate, and youth teams throughout the United States and Canada. The league is made up of various divisions for athletes ranging from the ages of 5 to 18 for junior divisions, and 7 adult divisions.

The International Wheelchair Basketball Federation (IWBF) recognizes the NWBA as the National Organization for Wheelchair Basketball (NOWB) for the United States.

In April 2023, the NWBA held its first Military Division Tournament.

== See also ==
- Wheelchair basketball in the United States
- Harry Vines (1938–2006), former NWBA president and Hall of Fame member
- Deborah Dillon Lightfoot (1956–2007), former NWBA secretary and Hall of Fame member
- Sarah Castle, former NWBA president and Hall of Fame member

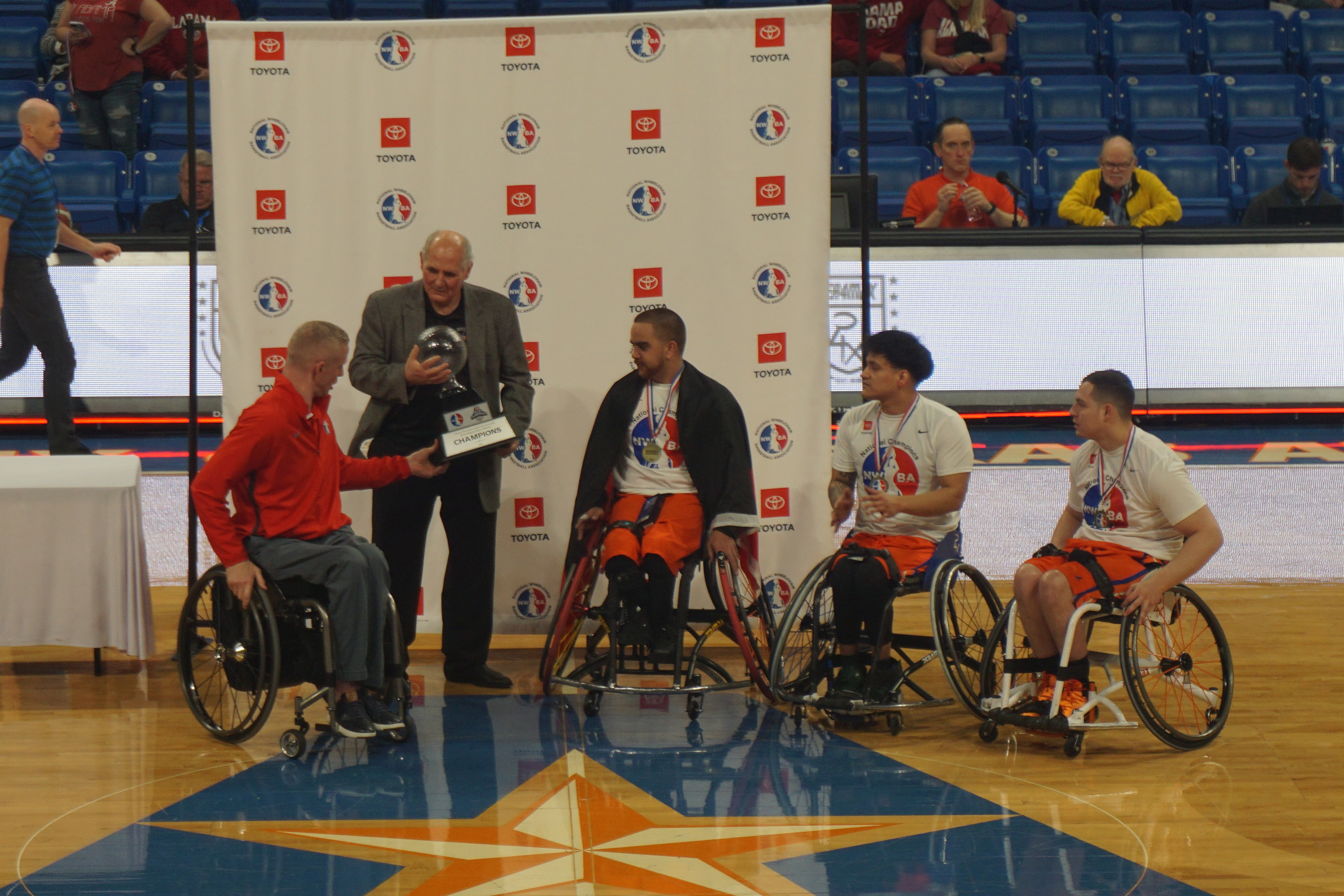
Trophy presentation after the 2022 National Intercollegiate Wheelchair Basketball Tournament Men's Championship
