= The First Team =

First basketball team

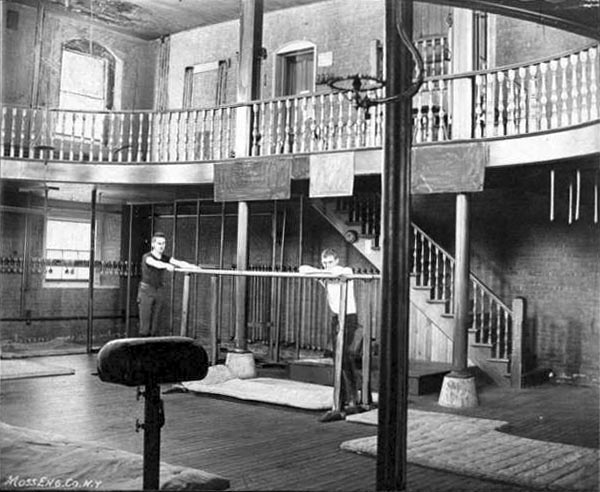
The gymnasium where basketball was invented in the School for Christian Workers (now Springfield College), c. 1887

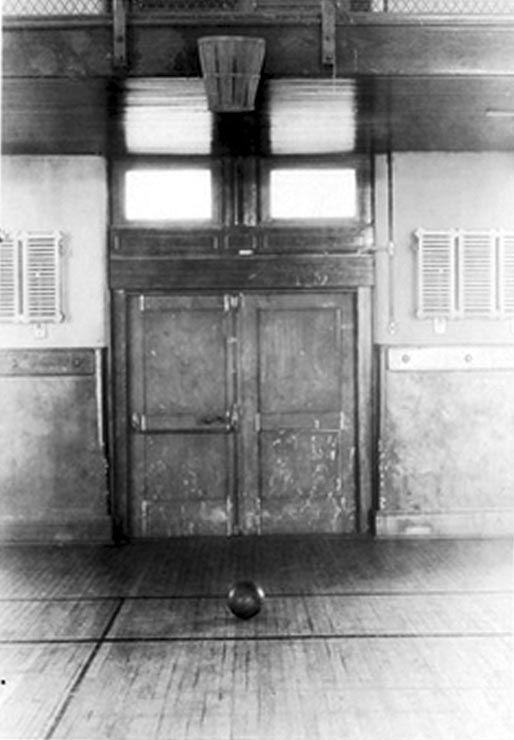
The original 1891 "Basket Ball" court in Springfield College. It used a peach basket attached to the wall

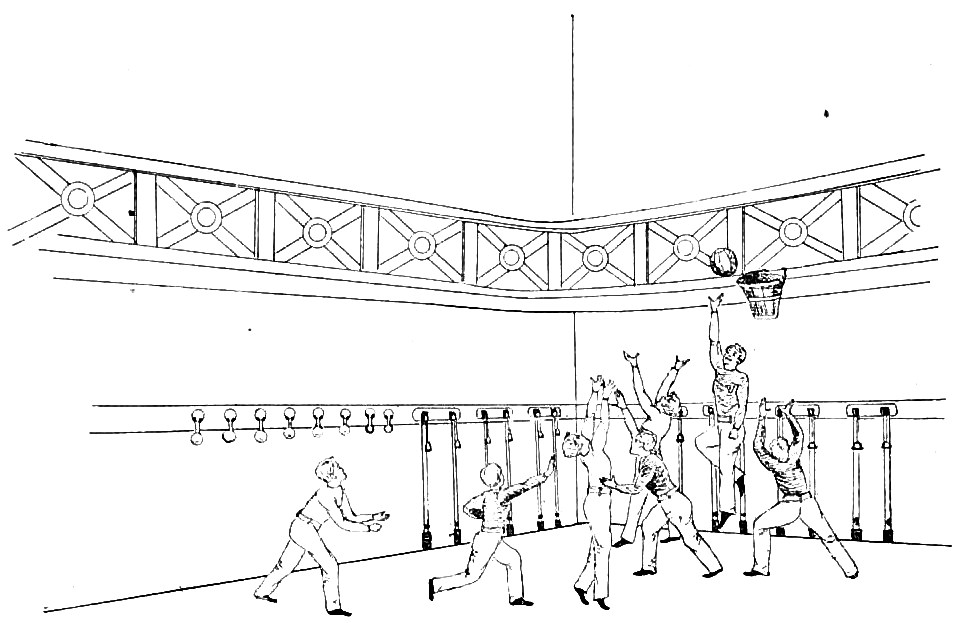
An illustration of the first game by participant Genzabaro Ishikawa

The First Team were the first players known to have played the sport of basketball, having been taught the game in 1891 by James Naismith, who is recognized as the inventor of the sport. The team comprised 18 players who were studying in Springfield, Massachusetts to become executive secretaries of the YMCA and who, as part of their coursework, studied physical education with Naismith, who is said to have invented the game to teach teamwork skills to his charges. The team was inducted as a group into the Naismith Memorial Basketball Hall of Fame as part of that organization's inaugural 1959 induction class for their efforts in popularizing the sport and as the game's first practitioners.

T. B. Patten and C. B. Libby were designated captains of the sides, who played a game that looked distinctly different from what fans would see in future years. With nine men to a side, each team had three forwards, three guards and three centers. The three positions were divided into three sections of the court. The guards were split up with one "goalkeeper" and two guards. While the forwards were split up with two forwards and one "home" position (described by James Naismith himself as the "home man"). And only the centers were allowed to roam freely around the court. The final score of the first game was 1–0 with William Chase scoring the first basket in the history of the sport.

In 1937, a re-enactment of the contest was played at Madison Square Garden in New York City using Naismith's 13 original rules, a soccer ball and peach baskets. Six members of the first team were interviewed by the organizers of the event to ensure it was true to the original game.

== Team members ==
The following are recognized by the Basketball Hall of Fame as members of "The First Team":

- Lyman Walker Archibald (July 3, 1868 – November 10, 1947)
- Franklin Everts Barnes (August 28, 1868 – October 3, 1947)
- Wilbert Franklin Carey (October 31, 1868 – June 16, 1940)
- William Richmond Chase (June 23, 1867 – August 30, 1951)
- William Henry Davis (July 31, 1867 – October 9, 1919)
- George Edward Day (September 21, 1864 – October 31, 1919)
- Benjamin Snell French (July 14, 1871 – March 21, 1910)
- Henry Gelan (September 13, 1863 – March 16, 1910)
- Ernest Gotthold Hildner (October 26, 1873 – July 15, 1968)
- Genzabaro Sadakni Ishikawa (July 27, 1866 – December 7, 1956)
- Raymond Pimlott Kaighn (December 8, 1869 – August 16, 1962)
- Donald Freas (December 24, 1865 - June 7, 1942)
- Eugene Samuel Libby (April 28, 1865 – September 1, 1948)
- Finlay Grant MacDonald (April 1, 1870 – March 29, 1951)
- Frank Hoyt Mahan (October 17, 1867 – February 11, 1905)
- Thomas Duncan Patton (April 15, 1865 – April 1, 1944)
- Edwin Pakenham Ruggles (January 5, 1873 – June 19, 1940)
- John George Thompson (September 10, 1859 – August 17, 1933)
- George Radford Weller (August 25, 1870 – February 11, 1956)
