= George Hoyt =

American basketball referee

George H. Hoyt (August 9, 1883 – November 11, 1962) was a basketball referee. He was nicknamed "Mr. Basketball" in New England, having officiated games in the region for 34 years. He often officiated two games a day at both the high school and college level. Hoyt was a proponent of developing a uniform set of rules and procedures, and wrote The Theory and Practice of Basketball Officiating, a textbook discussing many refereeing distinctions, including the difference between Eastern and Western referees.

== Biography ==
Hoyt was born on August 9, 1883, in Boston. After years of officiating both high school and college games, he was inducted into the Basketball Hall of Fame as a referee in 1961. He was an early proponent of the more open style of play that later became common in basketball, creating rules to discourage defensive holding and free up offensive players. He helped found the Eastern Massachusetts Board of Approved Basketball Officials and served as its president for two years. While serving as Chief of Officials for the Eastern Massachusetts High School Basketball Tournament (becoming Honorary Chief Official on retirement), he helped establish the New England Interscholastic Basketball Tournament. Hoyt died on November 11, 1962.
