= Tom Jernstedt =

American basketball administrator (1944–2020)

Thomas Walter Jernstedt (November 24, 1944 – September 6, 2020) was an American basketball administrator, working for the NCAA from 1972 until 2010. He was enshrined into the National Collegiate Basketball Hall of Fame as a contributor in 2010 and the Naismith Memorial Basketball Hall of Fame in 2017. Jernstedt died in Tequesta, Florida.

== Early life and education ==
Jernstedt was born in McMinnville, Oregon, and raised in Carlton, Oregon, and was a three-sport athlete at Yamhill Carlton High School. He received his Bachelor of Science and Master of Science degrees from the University of Oregon in 1967 and 1973, respectively. He was a football student-athlete while at Oregon, playing quarterback from 1964 to 1966 before injuries derailed his career. He was named senior class president in 1966. After graduation, Jernstedt spent two years in private business and then joined the athletic department at his alma mater, where he served in administrative positions between 1969 and 1972.

== Career ==
=== NCAA ===
The NCAA hired Jernstedt in 1972 as a director of events. He is credited with guiding the NCAA Men's Division I Basketball Championship to what it is today. Jernstedt oversaw his first Final Four in March 1973. He was promoted to assistant executive director in 1974. He held a number of senior-level management positions over the next 29 years, culminating in his appointment in 2003 as executive vice president. Jernstedt's duties included everything from managing events and overseeing branding to negotiating TV and corporate-sponsorship contracts. Jernstedt was let go after new NCAA President Mark Emmert took over in 2011.

In 2013, Jernstedt was selected to be a member of the first-ever College Football Playoff selection committee

=== USA basketball ===
Jernstedt first became associated with USA Basketball in 1975, serving as a member of its council. Jernstedt was vice president for men from 1976 to 1980 and served another stint as vice president for men from 1992 to 1996. He was USA Basketball's vice president from 1997 to 2000 and was the organization's president from 2001 to 2004. Under Jernstedt's tenure, the men's basketball team had disappointing results with a sixth-place finish in the 2002 FIBA World Championship and a bronze finish at the 2004 Olympics, leading to changes in how the team was selected.

== Awards and honors ==
- 2001 John Bunn Award
- 2009 USA Basketball's Edward S. Steitz Award
- 2017 Naismith Memorial Basketball Hall of Fame inductee
- In April 2023, a statue memorializing Jernstedt was unveiled in downtown Indianapolis, Indiana
