= United States women's William Jones Cup basketball team =

The R. Williams Jones Cup Team is one of the teams under the auspices of the USA Basketball organization. The R. William Jones Cup competition is an international basketball tournament for men's and women's teams held in Taipei, Taiwan almost annually since the inaugural event in 1977. The event is named after Renato William Jones, the founding secretary-general of FIBA, the International Basketball Federation. USA Basketball organized the USA Women's team entry from the time of the inaugural event through the year 2000. In most years, the team was selected from university and high school all stars. In some years, the team was predominantly selected from one university or conference. For example, the 1990 entry was predominantly the North Carolina State team, plus four other players. The 1991 team was composed of all-star players from the Pac-10 Conference.

== Record ==
- 1977: Fifth
- 1979: 1st
- 1980: 3rd
- 1981: 2nd
- 1982: 2nd
- 1983: Seventh
- 1984: 1st
- 1985: 1st
- 1987: 1st
- 1988: 2nd
- 1990: Sixth
- 1991: 3rd
- 1992: 1st
- 1993: 3rd
- 1994: 1st
- 1995: 3rd
- 1996: 1st
- 1997: 2nd
- 1998: 1st
- 2000: 1st

== Year by year results ==
=== 1979 ===
Head coach: Pat Summitt (at the time, Pat Head). Assistant coach: Betty Jo Crumm.

The USA team had recently completed the World Championship, so were able to bypass the preliminary rounds. They won all six contests and won the gold medal. Four of the USA team member were named to the 12 player all-tournament team:

- Carol Blazejowski
- Tara Heiss
- Nancy Lieberman
- Rosie Walker

=== 1980 ===
Head coach: Cherri Rapp. Assistant coach: C. Vivian Stringer.

The team started out strong, winning their first three games. Then they faced the Republic of China – Blue team, who beat the USA 86–81. They won their next fours games, including a close match against the undefeated Republic of China – White team, which they won 84–82, and a rematch against the Blue team, which they won 66–62. With a 4–0 record in medal round play, they simply had to beat their last opponent, South Korea, who had a 3~1 record, to win the gold. However, South Korea won the game 90–79. The Republic of China – White also won. leaving three teams tied with 4–1 records. The tie-breaker was point differential, and this left the USA team with the bronze medal. The all-tournament team included two members of the USA team:

- Mary Ostrowski
- Valerie Still

=== 1981 ===
Head coach: Linda Sharp. Assistant coach: Aki Hill.

The team won their first four games easily, then faced the Republic of China – Blue team. Although the USA had an early ten-point lead, the Blue team came back to lead by four points at halftime. The USA opened the second half with a 9–2 run to reclaim the lead for good and went on to win the game. They then went on to win their next two games easily, and faced the defending champions South Korea in the final. The game was very close, throughout much of the game, including a tie at 49 points each with about ten minutes to go. The South Koreans then pulled out to a nine-point lead with under two minutes left. The USA team pulled the margin back to three points, but could not close the gap. The South Korean team won, and the USA team received the silver medal. The all-tournament team included three members of the USA team:

- Jackie White
- Joyce Walker
- June Olkowski

=== 1982 ===
Head coach: Marian Washington. Assistant coach: Joan Bonvicini.

The team started out strongly, winning their first four games by 16 or more points. In the fifth game, they were matched against Australia. The game was close until the end. With a half-minute remaining, the USA held a one-point margin. The USA extended the lead to three points on two free throws, the Aussies brought it back to one with two free throws of their own, and the USA hit two free throws with two second left in the game to secure the 65–62 victory. The next two games were easy victories, then the USA based unbeaten Canada in the final game. The game was very close, but the USA fell to Canada 70–67 to finish with a single loss and the silver medal. The all-tournament team included two members of the USA team:

- Lea Henry
- Paula McGee

=== 1983 ===
Head coach: Juliene Simpson. Assistant coach: Lisa Williams.

The 1983 team was composed mainly of members of the Arizona State team, plus two players from California and one from Colorado. The game-by-game results and statistics are not available, although the final standings are known. The USA team finished seventh.

=== 1984 ===
Head coach: Pat Summitt. Assistant coaches: Nancy Darsch and Kay Yow.

The team chosen to represent the USA was the team expected to be selected as the National Team for the Olympics. This resulted in a very strong team which was able to dominate the competition. In the opening game against Australia, the USA won 82–20. While other games were closer, Italy's 23-point loss to the USA was the closest of the eight games. The USA won all eight games, and won the gold medal. The USA team was led by Cheryl Miller, who led the team in scoring at over 15 points per game, rebounding, free throw percentage, assists and steals. The all-tournament team included three members of the USA team:

- Cheryl Miller
- Lynette Woodard
- Denise Curry.

=== 1985 ===
Head coach: Theresa Grentz. Assistant coach: Chris Weller.

The team opened with a lopsided 92–18 victory over the Philippines, then faced Sweden in the second game. The game was close in the first half, and the half ended with the game tied at 31 points each. The USA pulled out to a six-point lead early in the second half but Sweden responded by scoring thirteen consecutive points to take a lead they would not relinquish. The USA team next faced undefeated South Korea. The game was tied again at the half, but this time the USA took a lead in the second half and held on to the lead for the win. They next played undefeated Republic of China and managed to come away with a win by the slimmest of margins, 56–55. After defeating Germany, they had another challenge from Canada, who raced out to a 42–30 lead by halftime. The Canadians still had a twelve-point lead late in the game, but the USA mounted a comeback, and out scored their opponent 18–4 to win the game 65–63. After beating Brazil, they faced Japan in the final game of the competition. Japan was in the lead with five minutes to go in the game, but the USA came back to win with a two-point margin 56–54. The win clinched the championship and the gold medal for the USA team. The all-tournament team included two members of the USA team:

- Suzie McConnell
- Fran Harris

=== 1987 ===
Head coach: Joann Rutherford. Assistant coach: Frankie Porter.

The team started out against Japan, and fell behind at the half. Seven consecutive points to start the second half put the USA team back in the lead, a lead they would not give up, and they went on to win 71–66. The next game against Belgium was also close, with a tie game at halftime, but the USA team managed a three-point victory, 54—51. After easily beating Malaysia, the USA team faced undefeated Republic of China, who kept the game close until halftime. Then the USA went out to a large lead and won 83–74. After beating their next two opponents, the USA team faced an undefeated South Korea. The USA led early but the game was tied at 70 points each with a minute left to go. Tonya Edwards hit two free throws to give the USA a lead, but South Korea hit a three-pointer to take the lead back. Nikita Lowry scored in the final seconds to give the USA team the win, and the gold medal with an overall 7–0 record. The all-tournament team included three members of the USA team:

- Nikita Lowry
- Tonya Edwards
- Edna Campbell

=== 1990 ===
Head coach: Kay Yow. Assistant coaches: Karen Freeman and Que Tucker.

The 1990 team was made up primarily of players from North Carolina State University. In addition, Katie Meier from Duke and Faith Mimnaugh from Loyola were on the team. The team started out with victories over Malaysia and the Netherlands. In the next game the USA faced the defending Jones cup champions South Korea. The USA team was down by eight points at halftime but close the gap and tied the score up at 76 points late in the game. However South Korea scored the final four points of the game to earn the victory. The USA then went on to lose to Taiwan and Hungary before facing Malaysia again and earning a win. In the final game the USA lost by three points to Japan and ended up with a 3–4 record.

=== 1992 ===
Head coach: Chris Weller. Assistant coaches: Kay James and Marynell Meadors.

The USA team started out with an eight-point win over Japan, then won their next five with double-digit margins. In their game against Australia, they trailed at halftime, but came back to win by ten points. In their next-to-last game, the USA faced South Korea, who gave the USA the toughest challenge yet, but the USA prevailed 91–84. The final game, for the gold medal, was a rematch against Australia. The score was tied late in the first half, but the USA team finished the half with seven straight point, taking a lead they would not give up. The USA completed the competition with an 8–0 record and won the gold medal. Lisa Leslie, at age 19 was playing in her first Jones cup competition. She was the leading scorer and rebounder on the USA team. Future Georgia Tech Head Coach MaChelle Joseph was the #3 scorer on the team; Joseph was making her second appearance on a USA Women's National Team.

=== 1993 ===
Head coach: Marynell Meadors. Assistant coaches: Evelyn Blalock and Kay James.

The team did not start well, losing the opening game to Japan, and followed that with a three-point loss to Republic of China – Cathay Life. The USA went on to win the next five contests, including a close 74–72 win against Russia, which propelled them to a medal context. That game was a rematch against Russia, and again the results were close. The USA team won 71–69 to win the bronze medal.

=== 1994 ===
Head coach: Sylvia Hatchell. Assistant coaches: Marti Gasser and Jim Lewis.

Despite having four players averaging double-digit scoring, including Wendy Palmer at almost 19 points per game, the USA had some close matches. After winning the opening game, the USA team faced the champions of the prior year, Republic of China – Cathay Life. The game came down to the final seconds, resulting in an 82–81 win. Palmer had 31 points, all needed. In the game against Kazakhstan, the USA was behind by two points at halftime, but came back to win. The USA repeated the feat against Canada, falling behind two points at halftime, but finishing with a win. The USA next faced unbeaten South Korea and came away with a win. Despite not losing a game, the USA needed to beat Republic of China – Nan Ya to advance to the gold medal game, and succeeded, with a 72–64 win. In the final game against South Korea, the teams were tied at the end of regulation and went into overtime. The USA was down with just over a minute to go when Palmer hit a basket to give the USA a one-point lead. After two free throws, South Korea scored, and had the ball on the final possession with a chance to win, but was unable to get up a shot in time. The USA won the gold medal with an 8–0 performance, but with many close games.

=== 1995 ===
Head coach: Lin Dunn. Assistant coaches: Amy Ruley and Trudi Lacey.

The USA team won its first six games, but four of the six were won by single-digit margins. Their seventh game was against Russia, and they fell 100–84. The final game was against South Korea, and a victory would assure the gold medal, but the South Korean team won 80–76 to win the gold medal. The USA team won the bronze medal.

=== 1996 ===
Head coach: Jane Albright-Dieterle. Assistant coaches: Gary Blair and Tori Harrison.

The USA team was dominant, winning their games by an average off 33 points per game. The USA team won their opening seven games, behind the scoring leadership of Sheri Sam, who averaged 13 points per game. In the eighth game, they played undefeated Slovakia, in a game that would determine the gold medal. The USA fell behind; Slovakia had a 22–15 lead. The USA came back, but was still behind at halftime. The game was tied at 45 all, when the USA hit several free throws to take a lead they would not give up. The USA team won he game and the championship 72–62. In the final game, the USA beat South Korea to finish the competition with a perfect 9-0 record.

=== 1997 ===
Head coach: Gail Goestenkors. Assistant coaches: Carolyn Peck and Jody Runge.

The USA team won their first six games. Four of the six were decided by six points or fewer, including the semifinal game against Japan which went to overtime. In the gold medal game, the USA faced undefeated South Korea. The USA team played to a six-point margin early in the second half, but could not extend the margin. South Korea came back, took the lead, and held on to win the championship and the gold medal 76-71.

=== 1998 ===
Head coach: Nell Fortner. Assistant coaches: Angie Lee and Trina Patterson

The opening game was against Republic of China. The USA held a small lead at halftime, jumped out to a larger lead and survived a comeback attempt from China to win the game 62–55. The remaining games would not be close, as the USA team beat South Korea, Senegal and Thailand by 27 points, and beat Japan by 42. The USA finished with a 5–0 record, and won the gold medal.

=== 2000 ===
Head coach: Bonnie Henrickson. Assistant coaches: Stephanie Gaitley and David 'Rusty' Ponton.

The USA team started strong with a 32-point win over the host team, the Republic of China National Team. They then beat South Korea easily and faced Japan in the third game. Japan started out strongly, and had an 18-point lead in the first half. The USA then out scored Japan 23–3 to take a small lead at the half. The USA built a ten-point lead, but Japan cut it back to three with under a minute to go. Kelly Schumacher grabbed an offensive rebound and scored to bring the lead back to five points and the team held on for the win. Schumacher had 24 points to help the USA team beat Japan 83–80. The final game was against Malaysia, but it wasn't close, with the USA winning 79–24, to secure a 4–0 record for the competition and the gold medal.

== Coaches and results ==
The USA competed in the R. William Jones Cup competition under the auspices of USA Basketball from the inaugural event in 1977 until 2000.

Name	Position	Coached at	Year	W–L	Results
Mildred Barnes	Head coach	Central Missouri State	1977	3–4	Fifth
Betty Jo Crumm	Assistant coach	Weatherford College (TX)	1977	3–4	Fifth
Pat Head Summitt	Head coach	Tennessee	1979	6–0	Gold
Betty Jo Crumm	Assistant coach	Weatherford College (TX)	1979	6–0	Gold
Cherri Rapp	Head coach	Texas A&M	1980	7–2	Bronze
C. Vivian Stringer	Assistant coach	Cheney State (PA)	1980	7–2	Bronze
Linda Sharp	Head coach	Southern California	1981	7–1	Silver
Aki Hill	Assistant coach	Oregon State	1981	7–1	Silver
Marian Washington	Head coach	Kansas	1982	7–1	Silver
Joan Bonvicini	Assistant coach	Cal State-Long Beach	1982	7–1	Silver
Juliene Simpson	Head coach	Arizona State	1983	n/a	Seventh
Lisa Williams	Assistant coach	Arizona State	1983	n/a	Seventh
Pat Head Summitt	Head coach	Tennessee	1984	8–0	Gold
Nancy Darsch	Assistant coach	Tennessee	1984	8–0	Gold
Kay Yow	Assistant coach	North Carolina State	1984	8–0	Gold
Theresa Grentz	Head coach	Rutgers	1985	7–1	Gold
Chris Weller	Assistant coach	Maryland	1985	7–1	Gold
Joann Rutherford	Head coach	Missouri	1987	7–0	Gold
Frankie Porter	Assistant coach	Anderson J. C. (SC)	1987	7–0	Gold
Ceal Barry	Head coach	Colorado	1988	5–2	Silver
Debbie Leonard	Assistant coach	Duke (NC)	1988	5–2	Silver
Kay Yow	Head coach	North Carolina State	1990	3–4	Sixth
Karen Freeman	Assistant coach	North Carolina State	1990	3–4	Sixth
Que Tucker	Assistant coach	North Carolina State	1990	3–4	Sixth
Elwin Heiny	Head coach	University of Oregon	1991	5–2	Bronze
Harold Rhodes	Assistant coach	Washington State University	1991	5–2	Bronze
Chris Weller	Head coach	Maryland	1992	8–0	Gold
Kay James	Assistant coach	Southern Mississippi	1992	8–0	Gold
Marynell Meadors	Assistant coach	Florida State	1992	8–0	Gold
Marynell Meadors	Head coach	Florida State	1993	5–2	Bronze
Evelyn Blalock	Assistant coach	Kilgore College (TX)	1993	5–2	Bronze
Kay James	Assistant coach	Southern Mississippi	1993	5–2	Bronze
Sylvia Hatchell	Head coach	North Carolina	1994	8–0	Gold
Marti Gasser	Assistant coach	U.S. Air Force Academy (C)	1994	8–0	Gold
Jim Lewis	Assistant coach	George Mason (VA)	1994	8–0	Gold
Lin Dunn	Head coach	Purdue	1995	6–2	Bronze
Trudi Lacey	Assistant coach	South Florida	1995	6–2	Bronze
Amy Ruley	Assistant coach	North Dakota State	1995	6–2	Bronze
Jane Albright-Dieterle	Head coach	Wisconsin	1996	9–0	Gold
Gary Blair	Assistant coach	University of Arkansas	1996	9–0	Gold
Tori Harrison	Assistant coach	Coppin State College (MD)	1996	9–0	Gold
Gail Goestenkors	Head coach	Duke	1997	6–1	Silver
Carolyn Peck	Assistant coach	Purdue (IN)	1997	6–1	Silver
Jody Runge	Assistant coach	Oregon	1997	6–1	Silver
Nell Fortner	Head coach	USA Basketball	1998	5–0	Gold
Angie Lee	Assistant coach	Iowa	1998	5–0	Gold
Trina Patterson	Assistant coach	College of William & Mary (VA)	1998	5–0	Gold
Bonnie Henrickson	Head coach	Virginia Tech	2000	4–0	Gold
Stephanie Gaitley	Assistant coach	St. Joseph's (PA)	2000	4–0	Gold
David 'Rusty' Ponton	Assistant coach	Grambling State (LA)	2000	4–0	Gold

== Players ==
The following players participated on the USA Basketball William Jones Cup teams:

Name	Played at	Year	Results
Kathy Anderson	Central Missouri State	1977	Fifth
Anne Donovan	Paramus H.S. (NJ)	1977	Fifth
Cindy Ely	Cherokee H.S. (GA)	1977	Fifth
Debra Groover	Cherokee H.S. (GA)	1977	Fifth
Katy Harte	Farmington H.S. (MI)	1977	Fifth
Trudi Lacey	Clifton Forge H.S. (VA)	1977	Fifth
June Olkowski	Santa Maria Goretti H.S. (PA)	1977	Fifth
Angela Paccione	Cornwall Central H.S. (NY)	1977	Fifth
Jill Rhodes	Delta State	1977	Fifth
Tammie Romstad	Truman H.S. (MO)	1977	Fifth
Helen Shereda	Oakland (MI)	1977	Fifth
Jane Zivalich	Maryland	1977	Fifth
Carol Blazejowski	Montclair State College	1979	Gold
Barbara Brown	Stephen F. Austin	1979	Gold
Denise Curry	UCLA	1979	Gold
Tara Heiss	Maryland	1979	Gold
Kris Kirchner	Maryland	1979	Gold
Nancy Lieberman	Old Dominion	1979	Gold
Ann Meyers	UCLA	1979	Gold
Jill Rankin	Wayland Baptist College	1979	Gold
Jackie Swaim	Texas	1979	Gold
Jan Trombly	Old Dominion	1979	Gold
Rosie Walker	Stephen F. Austin	1979	Gold
Holly Warlick	Tennessee	1979	Gold
Cathy Boswell	Illinois State	1980	Bronze
Laura Buehning	Cal Poly	1980	Bronze
Pam Crawford	Stephen F. Austin	1980	Bronze
Cindy Davies	Indiana Area H.S. (PA)	1980	Bronze
Janet Davis	Alta Loma H.S. (CA)	1980	Bronze
Corinne Gulas	Penn State	1980	Bronze
Lea Henry	Tennessee	1980	Bronze
Diane Hiemstra	Yarkton H. S. (SD)	1980	Bronze
June Olkowski	Rutgers	1980	Bronze
Mary Ostrowski	Rutgers	1980	Bronze
Beth Schroeder	Long Beach State	1980	Bronze
Valerie Still	Kentucky	1980	Bronze
Cynthia Cooper	Locke H. S. (CA)	1981	Silver
Ronda Falkena	North Carolina State	1981	Silver
Janet Gabriel	Oklahoma	1981	Silver
Diane Jones	Jackson State C.C.	1981	Silver
Barbara Kennedy	Clemson	1981	Silver
Robyn Mayo	Duval H.S. (MD)	1981	Silver
July Olkowski	Rutgers	1981	Silver
Cara Priddy	Kirtland Central H.S. (NM)	1981	Silver
Regina Street	Mitchell H. S. (TN)	1981	Silver
Joyce Walker	Louisiana State	1981	Silver
Jackie White	Louisiana State	1981	Silver
Yvette Angel	Ohio State	1982	Silver
Cathy Boswell	Illinois State	1982	Silver
Janet Davis	Old Dominion	1982	Silver
Shelia Foster	South Carolina	1982	Silver
Tanya Haave	Tennessee	1982	Silver
Lea Henry	Tennessee	1982	Silver
Paula McGee	Southern California	1982	Silver
Michelle Pennefather	Machebeuf H.S. (CO)	1982	Silver
Marcia Richardson	Maryland	1982	Silver
Valerie Still	Kentucky	1982	Silver
Lisa VanGoor	Colorado	1982	Silver
Valerie Walker	Cheney State	1982	Silver
Cynthia Cook	California	1983	Seventh
Kym Hampton	Arizona State	1983	Seventh
Lin Henley	Arizona State	1983	Seventh
Olivia Jones	Arizona State	1983	Seventh
Jodi Ratbun	Arizona State	1983	Seventh
Beckie Smatana	Arizona State	1983	Seventh
Barbara Smith	Arizona State	1983	Seventh
Karen Smith	California	1983	Seventh
Anna Van	Arizona State	1983	Seventh
Lisa VanGoor	Colorado	1983	Seventh
Jessica Wiley	Arizona State	1983	Seventh
Maria Wise	Arizona State	1983	Seventh
Cathy Boswell	Illinois State	1984	Gold
Denise Curry	UCLA	1984	Gold
Anne Donovan	Old Dominion	1984	Gold
Teresa Edwards	Georgia	1984	Gold
Lea Henry	Tennessee	1984	Gold
Janice Lawrence	Louisiana Tech	1984	Gold
Pam McGee	Southern California	1984	Gold
Carol Menken-Schaudt	Oregon State	1984	Gold
Cheryl Miller	Southern California	1984	Gold
Kim Mulkey	Louisiana Tech	1984	Gold
Cindy Noble	Tennessee	1984	Gold
Lynette Woodard	Kansas	1984	Gold
Lisa Becker	Iowa	1985	Gold
Debbie Black	St. Joseph's	1985	Gold
Anucha Browne	Northwestern	1985	Gold
Sarah Campbell	Missouri	1985	Gold
Belitta Croley	Kentucky	1985	Gold
Fran Harris	Texas-Austin	1985	Gold
Gay Hemphill	Texas-Austin	1985	Gold
Kahadeejah Herbert	Penn State	1985	Gold
Pam Leake	North Carolina	1985	Gold
Suzie McConnell	Penn State	1985	Gold
Lisa O'Connor	Georgia	1985	Gold
Trena Trice	North Carolina State	1985	Gold
Susan Anderson	Texas	1987	Gold
Shanda Berry	Iowa	1987	Gold
Edna Campbell	Maryland	1987	Gold
Tonya Edwards	Tennessee	1987	Gold
Vicki Hall	Brebeuf Prep H.S. (IN)	1987	Gold
Kerri Hobbs	North Carolina State	1987	Gold
Stephanie Howard	Radford	1987	Gold
Nikita Lowry	Ohio State	1987	Gold
Janet Malouf	Rugers	1987	Gold
Carla McGhee	Tennessee	1987	Gold
Franthea Price	Iowa	1987	Gold
Jodie Whitaker	Kentucky	1987	Gold
Jennifer Azzi	Stanford	1988	Silver
Felicia Braddy	Kansas	1988	Silver
Edna Campbell	Maryland	1988	Silver
Lisa Cline	Ohio State	1988	Silver
Tonya Edwards	Tennessee	1988	Silver
Shelia Frost	Tennessee	1988	Silver
Portia Hill	Stephen F. Austin	1988	Silver
Dale Hodges	St. Joseph's	1988	Silver
Jolette Law	Iowa	1988	Silver
Angelique Lee	Long Beach State	1988	Silver
Nikita Lowry	Ohio State	1988	Silver
Deanna Tate	Maryland	1988	Silver
Ashley Hancock	North Carolina State	1990	Sixth
Kerri Hobbs	North Carolina State	1990	Sixth
Krista Kilburn	North Carolina State	1990	Sixth
Jenny Kuziemski	North Carolina State	1990	Sixth
Krissy Kuziemski	North Carolina State	1990	Sixth
Sharon Manning	North Carolina State	1990	Sixth
Katie Meier	Duke	1990	Sixth
Faith Mimnaugh	Loyola	1990	Sixth
Danyel Parker	North Carolina State	1990	Sixth
Gerri Robuck	North Carolina State	1990	Sixth
Teri Whyte	North Carolina State	1990	Sixth
Marsha Williams	South Carolina	1990	Sixth
Monique Ambers	Arizona State	1991	Bronze
Nicole Anderson	UCLA	1991	Bronze
Tara Davis	Washington	1991	Bronze
Laura Moore	Washington	1991	Bronze
Judy Shannon	Oregon State	1991	Bronze
Jovonne Smith	Arizona State	1991	Bronze
Trisha Stafford	California	1991	Bronze
Rehema Stephens	UCLA	1991	Bronze
Tamryn Story	Southern California	1991	Bronze
Camille Thompson	Washington State	1991	Bronze
Staci Wallenborn	Oregon	1991	Bronze
Val Whiting	Stanford	1991	Bronze
Malissa Boles	Maryland	1992	Gold
Heather Burge	Virginia	1992	Gold
Katrina Colleton	Maryland	1992	Gold
Peggy Evans	Tennessee	1992	Gold
LeJuana Hardmon	Georgia	1992	Gold
Dena Head	Tennessee	1992	Gold
Karen Jennings	Nebraska	1992	Gold
MaChelle Joseph	Purdue	1992	Gold
Lisa Leslie	Southern California	1992	Gold
Joyce Pierce	Georgia Tech	1992	Gold
Dawn Staley	Virginia	1992	Gold
Andrea Stinson	North Carolina State	1992	Gold
Kina Brown	Western Michigan	1993	Bronze
Anita Clinton	Illinois	1993	Bronze
Tracy Conner	Wake Forest	1993	Bronze
Nekeshia Henderson	Texas	1993	Bronze
Anita Kaplan	Stanford	1993	Bronze
Kristen Mulligan	Auburn	1993	Bronze
Charisse Sampson	Kansas	1993	Bronze
Rhonda Smith	Washington	1993	Bronze
Vonda Ward	Tennessee	1993	Bronze
Samantha Williams	Auburn	1993	Bronze
Sara Wilson	Oregon	1993	Bronze
Falisha Wright	San Diego State	1993	Bronze
Stacy Coffey	Oklahoma State	1994	Gold
Tracy Conner	Wake Forest	1994	Gold
Latina Davis	Tennessee	1994	Gold
Barb Franke	Wisconsin	1994	Gold
La'Keshia Frett	Georgia	1994	Gold
Angela Gorsica	Vanderbilt	1994	Gold
Wendy Palmer	Virginia	1994	Gold
Stacey Reed	Kentucky	1994	Gold
Nykesha Sales	Bloomfield H.S. (CT)	1994	Gold
Charisse Sampson	Kansas	1994	Gold
Raquel Spurlock	Louisiana Tech	1994	Gold
Tora Suber	Virginia	1994	Gold
Kisha Ford	Georgia Tech	1995	Bronze
Angela Gorsica	Vanderbilt	1995	Bronze
Jennifer Jacoby	Purdue	1995	Bronze
Shannon Johnson	South Carolina	1995	Bronze
Stacey Lovelace	Purdue	1995	Bronze
Jannon Roland	Purdue	1995	Bronze
Saudia Roundtree	Georgia	1995	Bronze
Nykesha Sales	Connecticut	1995	Bronze
Sheri Sam	Vanderbilt	1995	Bronze
Charisse Sampson	Kansas	1995	Bronze
Erin Scholz	Colorado	1995	Bronze
Olympia Scott	Stanford (CA)	1995	Bronze
Sylvia Crawley	North Carolina	1996	Gold
Niesa Johnson	Alabama	1996	Gold
Shannon Johnson	South Carolina	1996	Gold
Michelle M. Marciniak	Tennessee	1996	Gold
Jennifer Rizzotti	Connecticut	1996	Gold
Nykesha Sales	Connecticut	1996	Gold
Sheri Sam	Vanderbilt	1996	Gold
Charlotte Smith	North Carolina	1996	Gold
Katie Smith	Ohio State	1996	Gold
Tina Thompson	Southern California	1996	Gold
Natalie Williams	UCLA	1996	Gold
Kara Wolters	Connecticut	1996	Gold
Nadine Domond	Iowa	1997	Silver
Tyish Hall	Duke (NC)	1997	Silver
Monica Maxwell	Louisiana Tech	1997	Silver
Kira Orr	Duke (NC)	1997	Silver
Murriel Page	Florida	1997	Silver
Katrina Price	Stephen F. Austin (TX)	1997	Silver
Jannon Roland	Purdue	1997	Silver
Paige Sauer	Connecticut	1997	Silver
Tangela Smith	Iowa	1997	Silver
Alicia Thompson	Texas Tech	1997	Silver
Michele VanGorp	Duke (NC)	1997	Silver
Stephanie White	Purdue (IN)	1997	Silver
Angie Braziel	Texas Tech	1998	Gold
Edwina Brown	Texas	1998	Gold
Peppi Browne	Duke	1998	Gold
Erin Buescher	UC Santa Barbara	1998	Gold
Tamika Catchings	Tennessee	1998	Gold
Summer Erb	North Carolina State	1998	Gold
Erica Gomez	UCLA	1998	Gold
Becky Hammon	Colorado State	1998	Gold
Lynn Pride	Kansas	1998	Gold
Semeka Randall	Tennessee	1998	Gold
Tamika Whitmore	Memphis	1998	Gold
Chanel Wright	North Carolina	1998	Gold
Chantelle Anderson	Vanderbilt	2000	Gold
Sue Bird	Connecticut	2000	Gold
Camille Cooper	Purdue	2000	Gold
Marie Ferdinand	Louisiana State	2000	Gold
Deanna Jackson	Alabama-Birmingham	2000	Gold
Loree Payne	Washington	2000	Gold
Shea Ralph	Connecticut	2000	Gold
Kelly Schumacher	Connecticut	2000	Gold
Michelle Snow	Tennessee	2000	Gold
Jackie Stiles	Southwest Missouri State	2000	Gold
Brooke Wyckoff	Florida State	2000	Gold
Angela Zampella	St. Joseph's	2000	Gold

== See also ==
- USA Basketball
- United States women's national basketball team
- United States women's World University Games basketball team
