= Carol Eckman Award =

College women's basketball award

- Awarded for: coach who best demonstrates the character of the late Carol Eckman
- Country: United States
- Presented by: Women's Basketball Coaches Association (WBCA)
- First award: 1986
- Currently held by: Mark Campbell, Union
- Website: Official site

The Carol Eckman Award is an award given annually since 1986 to the women's college basketball coach that "best demonstrates the character of the late Carol Eckman, the mother of the collegiate women's basketball national championship". Given by the Women's Basketball Coaches Association (WBCA), the award is named for former women's head coach Carol Eckman, best known for establishing in 1969 the first National Invitational Women's Intercollegiate Basketball Tournament.

Eckman, who served as head coach at West Chester State College, Indiana University of Pennsylvania, and Lock Haven State College, started the national tournament while at West Chester State College. She started the sixteen team tournament in 1969. Eckman invited 15 teams to the West Chester campus, charging each $25 to cover officials and awards. This tournament served as a springboard for the formation of the AIAW two years later, which administered national championships for many sports, including basketball, from 1971 until 1982, when the NCAA became involved in women's sports.

The criteria for the award include:

- Sportsmanship
- Commitment to the student-athlete
- Honesty
- Ethical behavior
- Courage

== Winners ==
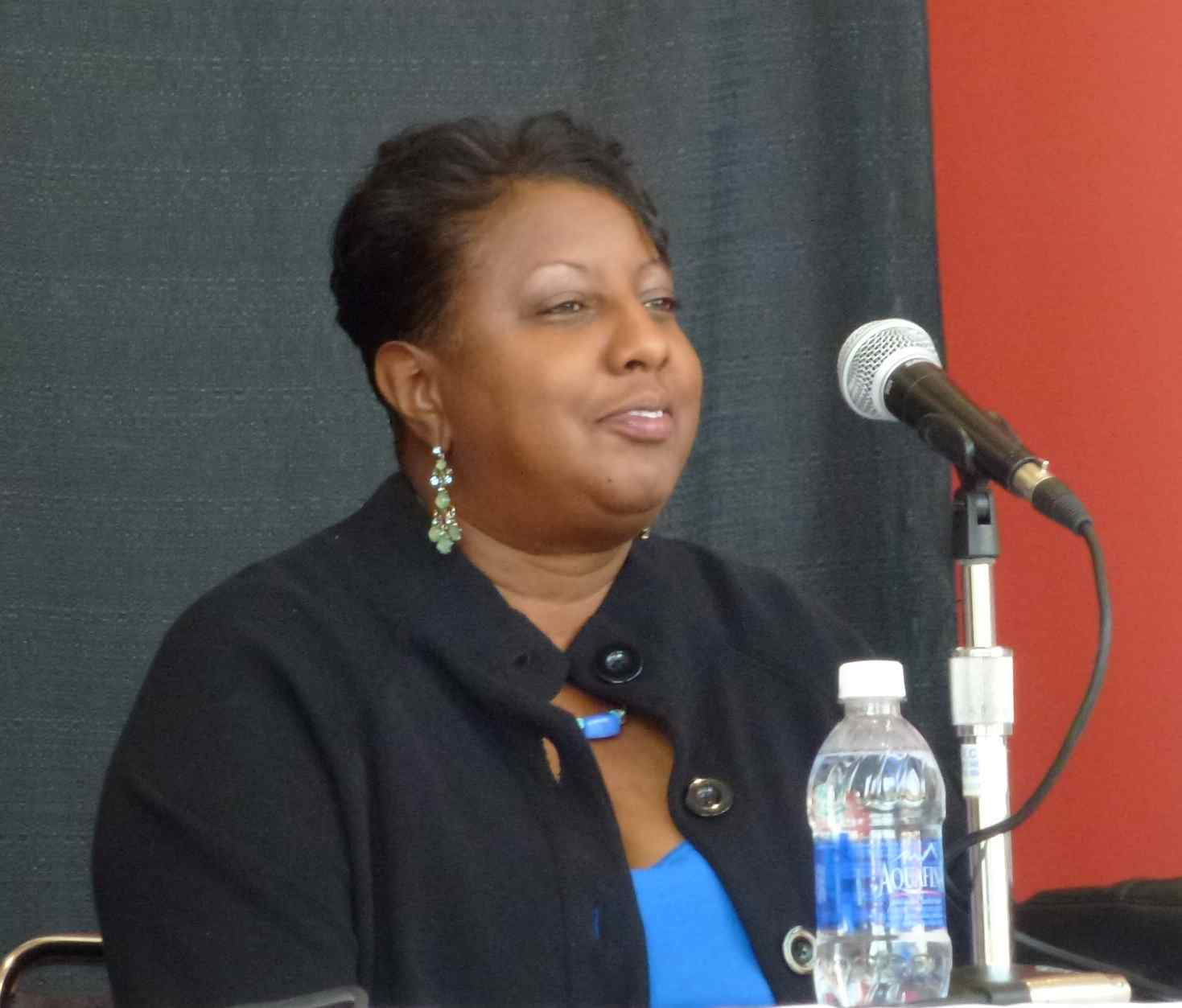
Susan Sommers, 1999 Award Winner

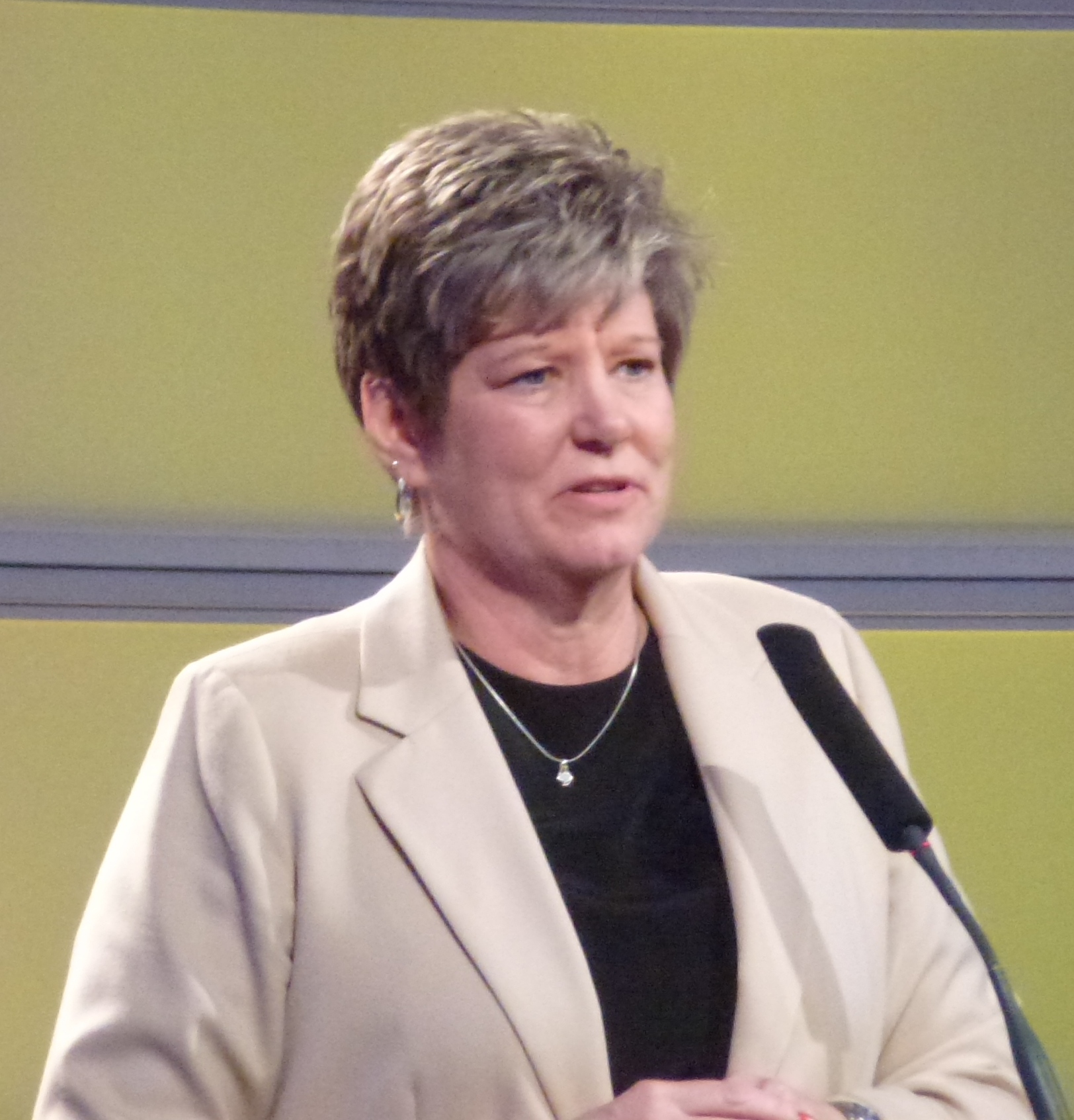
Sue Ramsey, 2012 Award winner

Year	Coach	School	Ref.
1986	Laura Mapp	Bridgewater	
1987	Jody Conradt	Texas	
1988	Kay Yow	NC State	
1989	Linda Hill-MacDonald	Minnesota	
1990	Maryalyce Jeremiah	Cal State Fullerton	
1991	Marian Washington	Kansas	
1992	Jill Hutchison	Illinois State	
1993	C. Vivian Stringer	Iowa	
1994	Sue Gunter	LSU	
1995	Ceal Barry	Colorado	
1996	Joann Rutherford	Missouri	
1997	Amy Ruley	North Dakota State	
1998	Kay James	Southern Miss	
1999	Susan Summons	Miami-Dade Community College	
2000	Kathy Delaney-Smith	Harvard	
2001	Juliene B. Simpson	East Stroudsburg	
2002	Barbara Stevens	Bentley	
2003	Marsha Sharp	Texas Tech	
2004	Deirdre Kane	West Chester	
2005	Bonnie Henrickson	Kansas	
2006	Gail Goestenkors	Duke	
2007	Theresa Grentz	Illinois	
2008	Doug Bruno	DePaul	
2009	Muffet McGraw	Notre Dame	
2010	Kevin Cook	Gallaudet	
2011	Joanne Boyle	California	
2012	Sue Ramsey	Ashland	
2013	Jan Ross	Oklahoma	
2014	Jane Albright	Nevada	
2015	Lisa Bluder	Iowa	
2016	Ginger Colvin	Campbellsville	
2017	Naomi Graves	Springfield (MA)	
2018	Tara VanDerveer	Stanford	
2019	Agnus Berenato	Kennesaw State	
2020	Harry Perretta	Villanova	
2021	Dixie Jeffers	Capital	
2022	Tricia Cullop	Toledo	
2023	Coquese Washington	Rutgers	
2024	Cori Close	UCLA	
2025	Joni Taylor	Texas A&M	
2026	Mark Campbell	Union	

== Sources ==
- VanDerveer, Tara (1998). Shooting from the outside : how a coach and her Olympic team transformed women's basketball. New York: Avon Books. ISBN 0380794985.
