= Theresa Grentz =

American basketball player-coach

Biographical details
- Born: March 24, 1952 (age 74); Spangler, Pennsylvania, U.S.

Playing career
- 1971–1974: Immaculata

Coaching career (HC unless noted)
- 1974–1976: Saint Joseph's
- 1976–1995: Rutgers
- 1995–2007: Illinois
- 2014–2015: Lafayette (assistant)
- 2015–2017: Lafayette

Head coaching record
- Overall: 681–362 (.653)
- Tournaments: AIAW Division I: 21–9; NCAA Division I: 14–14; WNIT: 5–5

Accomplishments and honors

Championships
- AIAW Division I (1982); 4× Atlantic 10 Tournament (1987–88, 1993–94); 8× Atlantic 10 regular season (1984, 1986–90, 1993–94); Big Ten regular season (1997)

Awards
- WBCA/Converse National Coach of the Year (1987); 4× Atlantic 10 Coach of the Year (1987–88, 1993–94); March of Dimes Coach of the Year (1991); Metropolitan Women's Basketball Association Coach of the Year (1993); 2× Big Ten Coach of the Year (1997–98); Carol Eckman Award (2007); Joe Lapchick Character Award (2013)
- Women's Basketball Hall of Fame
Medal record
Women's basketball
Representing United States
World University Games
| Silver medal – second place | 1973 Moscow | Team competition |
Head Coach for United States
Olympic Games
| Bronze medal – third place | 1992 Barcelona | Team competition |
FIBA World Championship for Women
| Gold medal – first place | 1990 Kuala Lumpur | Team competition |
Goodwill Games
| Gold medal – first place | 1990 Seattle | Team competition |
William Jones Cup
| Gold medal – first place | 1985 Taipei | Team competition |

Theresa Marie Shank Grentz (born March 24, 1952) is an American college basketball coach. Her coaching career spanned five decades, with over 680 career wins, multiple national and conference coaching awards, and a national championship. She is a member of the Women's Basketball Hall of Fame and the Naismith Memorial Basketball Hall of Fame.

Grentz grew up in Glenolden, Pennsylvania and played college basketball at Immaculata College, where she earned three All-American honors and was part of three consecutive AIAW national championship teams from 1972 to 1974. After graduating from college, Grentz was head coach at a recently created women's basketball program at Saint Joseph's College from 1974 to 1976.

From 1976 to 1995, Grentz was head women's basketball coach at Rutgers University–New Brunswick during a time when the Rutgers program was transitioning from the AIAW to NCAA levels. Grentz led Rutgers to the final AIAW national championship in 1982, after which Rutgers moved to the NCAA and joined the Atlantic 10 Conference in 1983. Rutgers won eight Atlantic 10 regular season and four Atlantic 10 tournament championships and appeared in nine consecutive NCAA Tournaments, and Grentz earned four Atlantic 10 Coach of the Year honors and three national honors. After Rutgers, Grentz was head coach at the University of Illinois at Urbana-Champaign from 1995 to 2007, taking Illinois to 10 postseason appearances and the 1997 Big Ten Conference regular season title. After a seven-year hiatus from coaching, Grentz returned to college basketball at Lafayette College, first as an assistant coach in 2014–15 then head coach from 2015 to 2017.

Outside of college basketball, Grentz also was head coach for the United States women's national basketball team for several international competitions from 1985 to 1992, including the 1992 Olympic bronze team.

== Early life and education ==
Born Theresa Marie Shank in Spangler, Pennsylvania, Grentz was raised in Glenolden, Pennsylvania and attended Cardinal O'Hara High School. She intended to go to college out of state, but when she was a high school senior, her family's home was destroyed by a fire, so she attended Immaculata College, then a women's college, closer to home. She graduated with a B.S. in Biology in 1974.

While a student at Immaculata, she played basketball for the Immaculata Mighty Macs. Under coach Cathy Rush, Grentz helped Immaculata win three straight AIAW National Championships between 1972 and 1974. The March 23, 1974 title game was the first ever live coverage of a US women's basketball game. She scored over 1,000 points in her career and earned three first-team All-American honors. Immaculata retired her jersey, number 12. She was named the AMF Collegiate Player of the Year. The Mighty Macs, as a team were inducted into the Naismith Hall of Fame in 2014.

== Team USA playing career ==
In 1973, Grentz was named to the team representing the US at the 1973 World University Games competition in Moscow, Soviet Union. It was the eighth such competition, but the first one in which the USA competed in women's basketball. The USA team had to play the Soviet Union in the opening round, and lost to the hosts, 92–43. The USA team bounced back and won their next two games. After preliminary play, the teams moved into medal rounds, where the first round loss carried over. In the medal round, the USA won their next three games, including a match against 6–0 Cuba, which the USA won 59–44. That sent them to the gold medal game, but against the host Soviet Union, now 7–0. The USSR won to capture the gold medal, while the USA finished with a silver in their first competition.

== College coaching career ==
=== Saint Joseph's (1974–1976) ===
After graduating from Immaculata in 1974, Grentz began teaching sixth grade at an elementary school, while working as a part-time assistant coach at Saint Joseph's College (now University) in Philadelphia. The women's basketball program at Saint Joseph's had only begun play in 1973. Grentz later became head coach and compiled a 27–5 record in two seasons from 1974 to 1976, including an appearance in the 1976 AIAW Large College Regionals.

=== Rutgers (1976–1995) ===
From 1976 to 1995, Grentz was head coach at Rutgers University–New Brunswick, where she became the first full-time women's basketball head coach in the U.S. In her first six seasons, Rutgers qualified for the AIAW Tournament every season and won the 1982 AIAW national championship.

In the 1980s, Rutgers moved from the AIAW to NCAA Division I, starting as an independent, non-conference member in 1981–82 before joining the Atlantic 10 Conference in 1983. The 1985–86 Rutgers team finished a perfect 16–0 in Atlantic 10 play and made the first of two consecutive Elite Eight appearances; The Star-Ledger awarded Grentz its Coach of the Year honor in women's basketball that season. Grentz's most successful season at Rutgers was in 1986–87 with a 30–3 record, Atlantic 10 regular season and conference titles, and Elite Eight appearance. That season, she won the Converse National Coach of the Year award from the Women's Basketball Coaches Association (WBCA). She was also named the March of Dimes Coach of the Year in 1990–91 and the Metropolitan Women's Basketball Association Coach of the Year in 1992–93.

In the Atlantic 10, Grentz led Rutgers to eight regular season conference titles in 1984, 1986, 1987, 1988, 1989, 1990, 1993, and 1994 and four conference tournament titles in 1986, 1987, 1993, and 1994. Rutgers also appeared in nine straight NCAA Tournaments from 1986 to 1994, including Elite Eight appearances in 1986 and 1987. The Atlantic 10 named Grentz the Coach of the Year in women's basketball in 1987, 1988 (shared), 1993, and 1994. In 19 seasons as Rutgers head coach, Grentz had a cumulative 434–150 record. At Rutgers, Grentz developed three All-American players: Kris Kirchner, June Olkowski, and Sue Wicks. Also, Wicks won National Player of the Year honors in 1987 and 1988 and was the sixth overall pick in the 1997 WNBA draft.

=== Illinois (1995–2007) ===
In 1995, Grentz was hired as head basketball coach by the University of Illinois at Urbana-Champaign. After going 13–15 in her debut season, Grentz led Illinois to a 24–8 record, no. 13 final national ranking, and Sweet 16 appearance in the 1997 NCAA tournament. Then in 1997–98, Illinois had a second straight trip to the Sweet 16 in a 20–10 season with a no. 14 final ranking. These were the first of seven consecutive postseason appearances; Illinois would later make the 1999 and 2000 NCAA Tournaments, the 2001 and 2002 Women's National Invitation Tournaments, and 2003 NCAA tournament.

Illinois fell to 10–18 in 2003–04, the worst season in Grentz's tenure, before improving with three consecutive winning seasons and WNIT appearances from 2005 to 2007. In the 2005 WNBA draft, Illinois forward Angelina Williams became the highest drafted Illinois player; she would be part of the 2006 Detroit Shock WNBA championship team.

Grentz resigned from Illinois on April 17, 2007. In her final season, she won the Carol Eckman Award from the WBCA. In 12 seasons, Grentz compiled a record of 210–156, the 1996–97 Big Ten Conference regular season title, five NCAA Tournament appearances, and five WNIT appearances.

=== Lafayette (2014–2017) ===
In the 2014–15 season, Grentz was an assistant coach at Lafayette College under Dianne Nolan on a 14–17 team. After Nolan retired, on April 20, 2015, Lafayette College announced Theresa Grentz as their new head women's basketball coach. Grentz went 10–51 in two seasons at Lafayette before being fired in April 2017.

== USA Basketball coaching ==
Grentz was selected as the head coach of the team representing the US in 1985 at the William Jones Cup competition in Taipei, Taiwan. The team opened with a lopsided 92–18 victory over the Philippines, then faced Sweden in the second game. The game was close in the first half, and the half ended with the game tied at 31 points each. The USA pulled out to a six-point lead early in the second half but Sweden responded by scoring thirteen consecutive points to take a lead they would not relinquish. The USA team next faced undefeated South Korea. The game was tied again at the half, but this time the USA took a lead in the second half and held on to the lead for the win. They next played undefeated Republic of China and managed to come away with a win by the slimmest of margins, 56–55. After defeating Germany, they had another challenge from Canada, who raced out to a 42–30 lead by halftime. The Canadians still had a twelve-point lead late in the game, but the USA mounted a comeback, and out scored their opponent 18–4 to win the game 65–63. After beating Brazil, they faced Japan in the final game of the competition. Japan was in the lead with five minutes to go in the game, but the USA came back to win with a two-point margin 56–54. The win clinched the championship and the gold medal for the USA team.

Grentz served as coach of the USA team at the 1990 Goodwill games, and the 1990 World Championships. The 1990 team won the gold medal in Kuala Lumpur, Malaysia. Grentz served as head coach of the 1992 Olympic team in Barcelona, which won the bronze medal.

Grentz had other USA Basketball experience. In 1981, she directed the U.S. Dial Junior National Team in Belgrade, Yugoslavia, and the U.S. Maccabiah Team in Israel, where the team won a silver medal. Grentz coached the U.S. World University Games team in Toronto in 1989 before heading the 1990 U.S. World Championships team in Malaysia and the U.S. Goodwill Games team in Seattle. Both of her 1990 national teams won gold medals in their respective tournaments. In 1990, Grentz was the head coach for the USA National team at the World Championships in Kuala Lumpur, Malaysia. The team, behind the 22 point per game scoring of Teresa Edwards, won all eight contests, with only the win over Cuba decided by single digits. The USA team faced Yugoslavia in the gold medal game, and won 88–78.

== Other work ==
In 2012, Grentz founded Grentz Elite Coaching, a basketball education program for children and coaches. Grentz has also been a consultant with Blue Star Basketball.

== Personal life ==
Grentz's father was an order selector at an A&P warehouse, and her mother was a nurse at the Mercy Fitzgerald Hospital in Darby, Pennsylvania.

In 1974, Grentz married Karl Grentz. They have two children.

== Head coaching record ==
Sources for records from 1974 to 2007:

Record table
| Season | Team | Overall | Conference | Standing | Postseason |
|---|---|---|---|---|---|
Saint Joseph's Hawks (Association of Intercollegiate Athletics for Women) (1974–1976)
| 1974–75 | Saint Joseph's | 9–2 | | | |
| 1975–76 | Saint Joseph's | 18–3 | | | AIAW Regional |
| Saint Joseph's: | | 27–5 (.844) | | | |
Rutgers Scarlet Knights (Association of Intercollegiate Athletics for Women) (1976–1981)
| 1976–77 | Rutgers | 17–11 | | | |
| 1977–78 | Rutgers | 16–12 | | | |
| 1978–79 | Rutgers | 26–4 | | | AIAW Consolation |
| 1979–80 | Rutgers | 28–5 | | | AIAW Quarterfinals |
| 1980–81 | Rutgers | 27–6 | | | AIAW second round |
| Rutgers (AIAW): | | 116–38 (.753) | | | |
Rutgers Scarlet Knights (NCAA Division I independent) (1981–1983)
| 1981–82 | Rutgers | 25–7 | | | AIAW Champions |
| 1982–83 | Rutgers | 19–10 | | | |
| Rutgers (NCAA Div. I ind.): | | 44–17 (.721) | | | |
Rutgers Scarlet Knights (Atlantic 10 Conference) (1983–1995)
| 1983–84 | Rutgers | 20–9 | 7–1 | 1st | |
| 1984–85 | Rutgers | 19–9 | 5–3 | T–4th | |
| 1985–86 | Rutgers | 29–4 | 16–0 | 1st | NCAA Division I Elite Eight |
| 1986–87 | Rutgers | 30–3 | 17–1 | 1st | NCAA Division I Elite Eight |
| 1987–88 | Rutgers | 27–5 | 17–1 | 1st | NCAA Division I Sweet 16 |
| 1988–89 | Rutgers | 24–7 | 16–2 | T–1st | NCAA Division I second round |
| 1989–90 | Rutgers | 20–10 | 16–2 | T–1st | NCAA Division I first round |
| 1990–91 | Rutgers | 23–7 | 15–3 | T–2nd | NCAA Division I first round |
| 1991–92 | Rutgers | 21–11 | 11–5 | T–2nd | NCAA Division I second round |
| 1992–93 | Rutgers | 22–9 | 12–2 | 1st | NCAA Division I second round |
| 1993–94 | Rutgers | 22–8 | 13–3 | T–1st | NCAA Division I first round |
| 1994–95 | Rutgers | 17–13 | 11–5 | T–3rd | |
| Rutgers (A-10): | | 274–95 (.743) | 156–28 (.848) | | |
| Rutgers (overall): | | 434–150 (.743) | 156–28 (.848) | | |
Illinois Fighting Illini (Big Ten Conference) (1995–2007)
| 1995–96 | Illinois | 13–15 | 6–10 | 8th | |
| 1996–97 | Illinois | 24–8 | 12–4 | T–1st | NCAA Division I Sweet 16 |
| 1997–98 | Illinois | 20–10 | 12–4 | 2nd | NCAA Division I Sweet 16 |
| 1998–99 | Illinois | 19–12 | 10–6 | 3rd | NCAA Division I second round |
| 1999–2000 | Illinois | 23–11 | 11–5 | 4th | NCAA Division I second round |
| 2000–01 | Illinois | 17–16 | 9–7 | 6th | WNIT second round |
| 2001–02 | Illinois | 15–14 | 7–9 | 8th | WNIT second round |
| 2002–03 | Illinois | 17–12 | 9–7 | 6th | NCAA Division I first round |
| 2003–04 | Illinois | 10–18 | 4–12 | T–8th | |
| 2004–05 | Illinois | 17–13 | 7–9 | 4th | WNIT first round |
| 2005–06 | Illinois | 16–15 | 6–10 | T–7th | WNIT second round |
| 2006–07 | Illinois | 19–12 | 8–8 | 4th | WNIT third round |
| Illinois: | | 210–156 (.574) | 101–91 (.526) | | |
Lafayette Leopards (Patriot League) (2015–2017)
| 2015–16 | Lafayette | 6–23 | 4–14 | T–8th | |
| 2016–17 | Lafayette | 4–28 | 2–16 | 10th | |
| Lafayette: | | 10–51 (.164) | 6–30 (.167) | | |
| Total: | | 681–362 (.653) | | | |
National champion Postseason invitational champion Conference regular season champion Conference regular season and conference tournament champion Division regular season champion Division regular season and conference tournament champion Conference tournament champion

== See also ==
- List of college women's basketball career coaching wins leaders
