= Olkowski =

Olkowski (feminine: Olkowska, plural: Olkowscy) is a Polish surname. Notable people with the surname include:

- Paweł Olkowski (born 1990), Polish footballer
- June Olkowski (born 1960), American former basketball player and coach, 2012 inductee to the National Polish-American Sports Hall of Fame
