= Joann Rutherford =

American basketball coach

Medal record

Women's basketball

Head Coach for United States

William Jones Cup
Gold medal – first place	1987 Taipei, Taiwan	Team competition

Joann Rutherford (born July 4, 1949) is an American retired basketball coach. She was the head women's basketball coach at the University of Missouri from 1975 to 1998. She holds school records for longest tenured head coach, most wins by a head coach with 422, and highest career winning percentage (.617). Her career record spanning 23 seasons is 422-263. She guided the Tigers to winning campaigns in 19 out of 23 seasons. She led the Tigers to four Big Eight Conference championships in 1984, 1985, 1987 and 1990.

Missouri also won five conference tournament championships, in 1978, 1983, 1985, 1986, and 1994. She is a three-time Big Eight coach of the year winner, getting honors in 1984, 1985, and 1990. In the 1980s, she was named Big Eight coach of the decade, after compiling a 213-98 record during that span. At the time of her retirement, she ranked 35th on the all-time list of coaching wins.

She has recorded 20 wins in 11 seasons, and has guided the Tigers to six berths in the NCAA tournament. Her 1982 team reached the Elite Eight, which is the furthest tournament run in school history. From 1983 to 1986, Missouri won three out of four Big Eight titles going 41-14 in conference play during that span.

== USA Basketball ==
Rutherford was selected as the head coach of the team representing the USA in 1987 at the William Jones Cup competition in Taipei, Taiwan. The team started out against Japan, and fell behind at the half. Seven consecutive points to start the second half put the USA team back in the lead, a lead they would not give up, and they went on to win 71–66. The next game against Belgium was also close, with a tie game at halftime, but the USA team managed a three-point victory, 54—51. After easily beating Malaysia, the USA team faced undefeated Republic of China, who kept the game close until halftime. Then the USA went out to a large lead and won 83–74. After beating their next two opponents, the USA team faced an undefeated South Korea. The USA led early but the game was tied at 70 points each with a minute left to go. Tonya Edwards hit two free throws to give the USA a lead, but South Korea hit a three-pointer to take the lead back. Nikita Lowry scored in the final seconds to give the USA team the win, and the gold medal with an overall 7–0 record.

Preceded by Alexis Jarrett	Missouri Women's Basketball Head Coach; 1975-1998	Succeeded by Cindy Stein

== Awards and honors ==
- 1996—Carol Eckman Award
