= Marian Washington =

American women's basketball coach

Biographical details
- Born: August 26, 1946 (age 80); West Chester, Pennsylvania, U.S.

Coaching career (HC unless noted)

Basketball
- 1972–1973: Kansas (assistant)
- 1973–2004: Kansas
- 1982: United States
- 1996: United States (assistant)

Track and field
- 1972–1973: Kansas

Administrative career (AD unless noted)
- 1974–1979: Kansas (women's)

Head coaching record
- Overall: 560–363 (basketball)
- Women's Basketball Hall of Fame

Marian Elizabeth Washington (born August 26, 1946) is an American former women's basketball coach, mostly known for her career at the University of Kansas, a post she held for over 30 years. Throughout her career, Washington achieved multiple awards and accomplishments which include achieving membership in the Women's Basketball Hall of Fame, leading KU to extensive victories, coaching her team in a number of NCAA Tournaments, and receiving the Black Coaches Association Lifetime Achievement Award. Washington was inducted into the Women's Basketball Hall of Fame in 2004.

== Early years ==
Raised on a farm near West Chester, Pennsylvania, Washington played seven sports at Henderson High School in West Chester.

== College ==
Washington attended West Chester State College (now known as West Chester University), where she played basketball on the team that won the first national women's tournament in 1969. That tournament was held under the auspices of the CIAW, a predecessor to the AIAW women's basketball tournament.

== Coaching ==
After one year as an assistant coach, Washington served as head coach for the Kansas Jayhawks women's basketball team at the University of Kansas from 1973 to 2004. Washington was also women's athletic director at Kansas from 1974 to 1979.

== USA Basketball ==
Washington was chosen as the head coach of the team representing the USA in 1982 at the William Jones Cup competition in Taipei, Taiwan. The team started out strongly, winning their first four games by 16 or more points. In the fifth game, they were matched against Australia. The game was close until the end. With a half-minute remaining, the USA held a one-point margin. The USA extended the lead to three points on two free throws, the Aussies brought it back to one with two free throws of their own, and the USA hit two free throws with two second left in the game to secure the 65–62 victory. The next two games were easy victories, then the USA faced unbeaten Canada in the final game. The game was very close, but the USA fell to Canada 70–67 to finish with a single loss and the silver medal. USA players Lea Henry and Paula McGee were named to the All-Tournament Team.

In 1996, Washington served as an assistant coach on the USA National Team, which went on to win the gold medal at the 1996 Summer Olympics in Atlanta, Georgia.

== Head coaching record ==
=== Basketball ===
Record table
Season	Team	Overall	Conference	Standing	Postseason
Kansas Jayhawks (Association of Intercollegiate Athletics for Women) (1973–1975)
1973–74	Kansas	11–8			
1974–75	Kansas	7–17			
Kansas Jayhawks (Big Eight Conference) (1975–1996)
1975–76	Kansas	13–14		5th	
1976–77	Kansas	11–15		4th	
1977–78	Kansas	22–11		2nd	NWIT
1978–79	Kansas	30–8		1st	AIAW Sectional
1979–80	Kansas	29–8		1st	AIAW Sectional
1980–81	Kansas	27–5		1st	AIAW Sectional
1981–82	Kansas	16–14		2nd	
1982–83	Kansas	13–15	9–5	3rd	
1983–84	Kansas	11–16	7–7	5th	
1984–85	Kansas	19–10	9–5	3rd	
1985–86	Kansas	18–10	9–5	T–2nd	
1986–87	Kansas	20–13	9–5	T–1st	NCAA second round
1987–88	Kansas	22–10	8–6	T–3rd	NCAA second round
1988–89	Kansas	13–14	5–9	T–6th	
1989–90	Kansas	20–9	9–5	T–4th	
1990–91	Kansas	20–13	7–7	5th	WNIT
1991–92	Kansas	25–6	12–2	1st	NCAA first round
1992–93	Kansas	21–9	9–5	T–3rd	NCAA first round
1993–94	Kansas	22–6	11–3	2nd	NCAA second round
1994–95	Kansas	20–11	8–6	3rd	NCAA first round
1995–96	Kansas	22–10	11–3	1st	NCAA Sweet 16
Kansas (Big Eight):		414–227 (.646)	123–73 (.628)		
Kansas Jayhawks (Big 12 Conference) (1996–2004)
1996–97	Kansas	25–6	14–2	1st	NCAA second round
1997–98	Kansas	23–9	11–5	T–3rd	NCAA Sweet 16
1998–99	Kansas	23–10	11–5	3rd	NCAA second round
1999–2000	Kansas	20–10	11–5	4th	NCAA first round
2000–01	Kansas	12–17	5–11	9th	
2001–02	Kansas	5–25	0–16	12th	
2002–03	Kansas	11–18	3–13	9th	
2003–04	Kansas	9–16*	2–11*	(resigned)*	
Kansas (Big 12):		128–111 (.536)	57–68 (.456)		
Total:		560–363 (.607)			
National champion Postseason invitational champion Conference regular season champion Conference regular season and conference tournament champion Division regular season champion Division regular season and conference tournament champion Conference tournament champion

*Washington resigned with three games remaining in the 2003–04 season; assistant Lynette Woodard served as head coach for the remainder of the season and went 0–3 for a cumulative season record of 9–19 (2–14 Big 12) and 11th place finish.

== Awards and honors ==
- 1991 — Carol Eckman Award
