= Kay Yow =

American basketball coach (1942–2009)

Biographical details
- Born: March 14, 1942; Gibsonville, North Carolina, U.S.
- Died: January 24, 2009 (aged 66); Cary, North Carolina, U.S.

Coaching career (HC unless noted)
- 1971–1975: Elon
- 1975–2009: NC State

Head coaching record
- Overall: 737–344 (.682)

Accomplishments and honors

Championships
- 5× ACC regular season (1978, 1980, 1983, 1985, 1990); 4× ACC tournament (1980, 1985, 1987, 1991)

Awards
- Jimmy V ESPY for Perseverance (2007); FIBA Hall of Fame (2009)
- Basketball Hall of Fame; Inducted in 2002
- Women's Basketball Hall of Fame
Medal record
Women's basketball
Head coach for United States
Olympic Games
Gold medal – first place	1988 Seoul	Team competition
FIBA World Championship for Women
Gold medal – first place	1986 Moscow	Team competition
Goodwill Games
Gold medal – first place	1986 Moscow	Team competition
World University Games
Silver medal – second place	1981 Bucharest	Team competition
Assistant coach for United States
William Jones Cup
Gold medal – first place	1984 Taipei	Team competition
Olympic Games
Gold medal – first place	1984 Los Angeles	Team competition
Pan American Games
Gold medal – first place	1983 Caracas	Team competition
World University Games
Gold medal – first place	1979 Mexico City	Team competition

Sandra Kay Yow (March 14, 1942 – January 24, 2009) was an American basketball coach. She was the head coach of the NC State Wolfpack women's basketball team from 1975 to 2009. A member of the Naismith Hall of Fame, she had more than 700 career wins. She also coached the U.S. women's basketball team to an Olympic gold medal in 1988 despite having been diagnosed with breast cancer in 1987. In 2000, Yow was inducted into the Women's Basketball Hall of Fame. In 2009, she was inducted into the FIBA Hall of Fame.

In April 2010, CollegeInsider.com created a new award called the Kay Yow National Coach of the Year Award in her honor. It is presented annually to the women's college basketball head coach who displays great personal character on and off the court.

== Education and coaching career ==
Yow received her Bachelor of Science degree in English from East Carolina University in 1964, she was a member of the Delta Zeta sorority. After graduation she worked as an English teacher, librarian and girls' basketball coach at Allen Jay High School in High Point, North Carolina. She then earned her Master's degree in Physical Education from UNC-Greensboro in 1970 and then took the position of women's athletics coordinator and women's basketball coach at Elon College.

In 1975, Yow became NC State's first full-time women's basketball coach and also coached women's volleyball and softball. She led the women's basketball team to an ACC championship in the first season of league play in 1978.

On January 11, 2001, she reached the 600-win milestone for her career with a 71–64 win over Temple University. On February 5, 2007, she reached the 700-win milestone for her career with a 68–51 win over Florida State University. At the time of her death, she ranked as the fifth winningest active NCAA Division I women's basketball coach. In recognition for her dedication and success, Yow was selected for induction into the Women's Basketball Hall of Fame in 2000 and the Naismith Memorial Basketball Hall of Fame on June 5, 2002, the fifth female coach to be selected. On February 16, 2007, the basketball court at Reynolds Coliseum was renamed Kay Yow Court in her honor. On July 11, 2007, Yow received the inaugural Jimmy V ESPY Award for Perseverance, an award named for fellow NC State basketball coach and friend Jim Valvano. She received a standing ovation.

Yow also coached the silver-medal-winning U.S. women's basketball team in the 1981 World University Games; the 1986 gold-winning U.S. teams in the Goodwill Games and the FIBA World Championship; and the gold-medal-winning U.S. women's basketball team in the 1988 Seoul Olympics.

== USA Basketball ==
Yow was the assistant coach of the team representing the US at the World University Games held in Mexico City, Mexico in August 1979. The opening game was against Costa Rica, and the USA almost outscored them by triple digits, falling just shy at 132–34. The next three games were closer, but all margins were in double digits. The fifth game was against the USSR who had won the event in 1973 and 1977. The Soviet team led at halftime, but the USA team outscored the USSR by three points in the second half to win 83–81, the first win by the USA over the USSR in a major competition in two decades. The next game was a rematch against Canada, the team they had beaten by 14 points a few days earlier. This time the Canadian team would take a nine-point lead at halftime, but the USA team came back and won 68–60. The final game of the competition was against Cuba, which the USA won 73–60 to claim their first gold medal in a World University Games event.

Yow was the head coach of the team representing the US at the World University Games held in Bucharest, Romania in July 1981. The team started with a game against Finland and won easily, 68–49. They trailed at halftime in their next game against China, but came back to win a close game 76–74. After beating Poland, they played Czechoslovakia in a game that was close at the half, but the USA team went on to win 86–67. In the following game against Canada, the USA team was again behind at the half, but played a close match in the second half and pulled ahead to win 79–76. Despite being undefeated, they needed a win against Romania to advance to the gold medal game. They had only a one-point lead at halftime, but went on to win 75–64 to meet the undefeated USSR for the gold medal. The USA fell behind by sixteen and could not close the gap—the USSR team won 98–79 to claim the gold medal, leaving the US with the silver. Denise Curry was the leading scorer for the USA team with 18.1 points per game. Anne Donovan led the team in rebounds with 6.7 per game.

Yow served as an assistant coach of the team representing the US in 1984 at the William Jones Cup competition in Taipei, Taiwan. The team chosen to represent the USA was the team expected to be selected as the National Team for the Olympics. This resulted in a very strong team which was able to dominate the competition. In the opening game against Australia, the USA won 82–20. While other games were closer, Italy's 23-point loss to the USA was the closest of the eight games. The USA won all eight games, and won the gold medal. The USA team was led by Cheryl Miller, who led the team in scoring at over 15 points per game, rebounding, free throw percentage, assists and steals. Miller was named to the All-Tournament Team, along with Lynette Woodard, and Denise Curry.

Yow was named head coach of the USA National Team which would compete at the 1986 World Championships and the 1990 Olympics. The World Championships were held in Moscow, Soviet Union in August. The USA team started strong with a more than 50-point victory over Taipei. The USA team continued to dominate their opponents, winning the next three preliminary rounds games, with a 15-point victory over Hungary being the closest margin, then advanced to the medal play rounds. They defeated China in the quarterfinals, and Canada in the semifinals, to set up the championship match against the undefeated host Soviet Union. Although the USA had recently defeated the Soviets in the Goodwill Games, Americans wanted to demonstrate that the victory was no "fluke". The Soviet team was taller, but the USA team was able to outscore them. The USA team started the game with the first eight points, and had a 15–1 run during the second half, and won in convincing fashion 108–88 to win the gold medal and the world championship. Every one of the starters achieved double-digit scoring in the final game, led by Cheryl Miller who had 24 points along with 15 rebounds in the championship game.

All-Time College Coaching Record
Season	Team	Record	Postseason	AP Poll
1971–72	Elon	5-11		
1972–73	Elon	13-3	NCAIAW State Tournament	
1973–74	Elon	20-1	AIAW Regionals	
1974–75	Elon	19-4	AIAW Regionals	
1975–76	NC State	19-7	Women's NIT Quarterfinals	
1976–77	NC State	21-3	AIAW Region II	10
1977–78	NC State	29-5	AIAW Elite Eight	3
1978–79	NC State	27-7	AIAW Region II	11
1979–80	NC State	28-8	AIAW Sweet 16	10
1980–81	NC State	21-10	AIAW Sweet 16	13
1981–82	NC State	24-7	NCAA Sweet 16	12
1982–83	NC State	22-8	NCAA 1st Round	16
1983–84	NC State	23-9	NCAA Sweet 16	16
1984–85	NC State	25-6	NCAA Sweet 16	12
1985–86	NC State	18-11	NCAA 2nd Round	
1986–87	NC State	24-7	NCAA Sweet 16	13
1987–88	NC State	10-17		
1988–89	NC State	24-7	NCAA Sweet 16	13
1989–90	NC State	25-6	NCAA Sweet 16	11
1990–91	NC State	27-6	NCAA Sweet 16	7
1991–92	NC State	16-12		
1992–93	NC State	14-13		
1993–94	NC State	13-14		
1994–95	NC State	21-10	NCAA Sweet 16	24
1995–96	NC State	20-10	NCAA 2nd Round	23
1996–97	NC State	19-12	NCAA 1st Round	
1997–98	NC State	25-7	NCAA Final Four	10
1998–99	NC State	17-12	NCAA 2nd Round	
1999–00	NC State	20-9	NCAA 1st Round	23
2000–01	NC State	22-11	NCAA Sweet 16	19
2001–02	NC State	14-15		
2002–03	NC State	11-17		
2003–04	NC State	17-15	NCAA 1st Round	
2004–05	NC State	21-8	NCAA 1st Round	21
2005–06	NC State	19-12	NCAA 1st Round	
2006–07	NC State	15-4	NCAA Sweet 16	18
2007–08	NC State	21-13	Women's NIT Semifinals	
2008–09	NC State	8-7		
Overall		737-344	.682	

ACC Regular Season Champion
ACC Tournament Champion
ACC Regular Season and Tournament Champion

== Personal life ==
Yow lived in Cary, North Carolina.

Yow and her two sisters are natives of Gibsonville, North Carolina. They were all three active in collegiate sports. Deborah Yow was the athletic director at North Carolina State University, and Susan Yow coached women's basketball at the University of North Carolina at Wilmington, Kansas State University, Drake University, East Tennessee State University, Providence College, and Belmont Abbey College. Susan Yow was in her second season as head coach at Belmont Abbey College. Susan served as an assistant coach for two now-defunct WNBA teams, the Charlotte Sting and the Cleveland Rockers. In 2006, Susan was named as an assistant coach with the Minnesota Lynx, but resigned along with head coach Suzie McConnell-Serio on July 23, 2006.

After her 1987 breast cancer diagnosis, Yow became active in raising awareness as well as money to battle the disease. In 2007, the Kay Yow/WBCA Cancer Fund was instituted by the Women's Basketball Coaches Association and the V Foundation for Cancer Research, of which she served on the board of directors. Her cancer recurred in November 2004 and she began radiation treatments the following month after having surgery.

== Death ==
Yow had been on a leave of absence from coaching since early January 2009 because of her disease. She died from stage 4 breast cancer on January 24, 2009, in Cary, North Carolina. In her obituary, the Charlotte Observer said, "Yow never lost her folksy, easygoing manner and refused to dwell on her health issues, though they colored everything she did almost as much as basketball. Ultimately, her philosophy on both were the same."

Yow planned her own funeral before she died and recorded a 25-minute video to be played at the service. More than 1,400 people attended the funeral on January 30 at Colonial Baptist Church in Cary, as Yow thanked her supporters on the video. "And now I say farewell," she bade the mourners, "and it's been a wonderful journey, especially since the time I accepted Jesus as my Lord and Savior".

== Awards ==
- 1987—Amos Alonzo Stagg Coaching Award
- 1988—Carol Eckman Award
- 1990—Russell Athletic/WBCA National Coach of the Year
- 2007—Coach Yow received the Mildred "Babe" Didrikson Zaharias Courage Award from the United States Sports Academy in recognition of courageous action in overcoming adversity to excel in sport.
- 2007 — Jimmy V ESPY Award for Perseverance
- 2009—FIBA Hall of Fame

== See also ==
- List of college women's basketball career coaching wins leaders
