= Rutgers Scarlet Knights women's basketball =

Women's basketball team of Rutgers University

| 2026–27 Rutgers Scarlet Knights women's basketball team |
- University: Rutgers University–New Brunswick
- Head coach: Gary Redus II (1st season)
- Location: Piscataway, New Jersey
- Arena: Jersey Mike's Arena (capacity: 8,000)
- Conference: Big Ten
- Nickname: Scarlet Knights
- Colors: Scarlet

NCAA Division I tournament runner-up
- 2007
Other NCAA Division I tournament results
| Final Four | 2000, 2007 |
| Elite Eight | 1986, 1987, 1999, 2000, 2005, 2007, 2008 |
| Sweet Sixteen | 1986, 1987, 1988, 1998, 1999, 2000, 2005, 2006, 2007, 2008, 2009 |
| Appearances | 1986, 1987, 1988, 1989, 1990, 1991, 1992, 1993, 1994, 1998, 1999, 2000, 2001, 2003, 2004, 2005, 2006, 2007, 2008, 2009, 2010, 2011, 2012, 2015, 2019, 2021 |

AIAW tournament champions
- 1982
Other AIAW tournament results
| Final Four | 1982 |
| Quarterfinals | 1982 |
| Appearances | 1979, 1980, 1981, 1982 |

Conference tournament champions
- A-10: 1987, 1988, 1993, 1994; Big East: 2007

Conference regular-season champions
- 1984, 1986, 1987, 1988, 1989, 1990, 1993, 1994, 1998, 1999, 2005, 2006

Uniforms
| Home | Away |

The Rutgers Scarlet Knights women's basketball team is the intercollegiate women's basketball program representing Rutgers University–New Brunswick. The school competes in the Big Ten Conference in Division I of the National Collegiate Athletic Association (NCAA). The Scarlet Knights play home basketball games at the Jersey Mike's Arena on the university campus in Piscataway, New Jersey.

== History ==
The Scarlet Knights (known as the Lady Knights until 1995) began play in 1974, winning their first ever game against Princeton 76–60. In 1976, Theresa Shank Grentz was hired as head coach, becoming the first full-time female basketball coach. The Scarlet Knights won the AIAW National Tournament 83–77 over Texas at the Palestra with the help of Restrepo-Pinero, who scored 30 points while being named MVP. In 2007, C. Vivian Stringer became the first coach to ever lead three teams (including Rutgers) to the Final Four.

== Retired Numbers ==
Rutgers Scarlet Knights retired numbers
| No. | Player | Date of retirement | Career |
| 23 | Sue Wicks | April 26, 1998 | 1984–1988 |
| 25 | Cappie Pondexter | December 1, 2016 | 2002–2006 |
| 45 | June Olkowski | January 2, 1988 | 1978–1982 |

== All-Time Statistical Leaders ==
=== Career leaders ===
- Points scored: 2,655 (Sue Wicks – 1984–88)
- Assists: 839 (Tasha Pointer – 1997-01)
- Rebounds: 1,357 (Sue Wicks – 1984–88)
- Steals: 294 (Cappie Pondexter – 2002–06)
- Blocks: 332 (Rachel Hollivay – 2012–2016)

=== Single season leaders ===
- Points scored: 793 (Sue Wicks- 1987–88)
- Assists: 257 (Tasha Pointer – 2000–01)
- Rebounds: 404 (Sue Wicks – 1986–87)
- Steals: 117 (Liz Hanson – 1993–94)
- Blocks: 127 (Rachel Hollivay – 2013–14)

=== Single game leaders ===
- Points scored: (44 by Sue Wicks vs George Washington −12/05/1987)
- Assists: (18 by Tasha Pointer vs Stephen F. Austin – 03/17/2001)
- Rebounds: (26 by Sandy Tupurins vs William Paterson – 03/01/1977)
- Steals: (10 by Syessence Davis vs Penn State – 01/10/2015 & 10 by Denise Kenney vs Saint Joseph’s – 02/16/1978)
- Blocks: (11 by Sue Wicks vs West Virginia – 01/03/1987)

== Awards and honors ==
- Naismith/U.S. Basketball Writers Association/Women’s Basketball News Service/Street & Smith’s National Player of the Year – Sue Wicks, 1988 winner.
- Big East Conference Coach of the Year – C. Vivian Stringer, 1998 & 2005.
- Atlantic-10 Conference Coach of the Year – Theresa Grentz, 1986, 1988 (co), 1993, & 1994.

=== International ===
- Mael Gilles Canada: 2017 Summer Universiade
- Kahleah Copper United States 2024 Paris Olympics

== Coaching history ==
As of the beginning of the 2024–25 season, the Knights have had five head coaches and two interim coaches.

| Coach | Tenure | Record | Conference record |
|---|---|---|---|
| Ellen Johns | 1974–1975 | 6–5 | n/a |
| Dottie McCrea | 1975–1976 | 5–9 | n/a |
| Theresa Grentz | 1976–1995 | 434–150 | 156–28 |
| C. Vivian Stringer | 1995–2022 | 477–267 | 243–136† |
| Carlene Mitchell (interim) | 2010 | 1–0 | 0–0 |
| Timothy Eatman (interim) | 2018 | 4–2 | 3-0 |
| Coquese Washington | 2022–2026 | 42-84 | 11-61 |
| Gary Redus II | 2026–present | 0-0 | 0-0 |
| Totals | | 941–462 | 404–181 |

† Denotes combined conference record (202–94 record with the Big East Conference (1979-2013), 12–6 record with the American Athletic Conference, and 19–15 record with the Big Ten Conference)

== 2026-27 Coaching Staff ==
| Name | Position | Consecutive season at Rutgers in current position |
|---|---|---|
| Gary Redus II | Head coach | 1st |
| Daphne Mitchell | Assistant coach | 1st |
| Lauren Hansen | Assistant coach | 1st |
| Manisha Redus | Assistant coach | 1st |
| Preston Beverly | Assistant coach | 1st |
| Matthew Brune | General Manager | 1st |

== Roster ==
2026–27 Rutgers Scarlet Knights women's basketball team
Players
Coaches

| Pos. | # | Name | Height | Year | Previous school | Hometown |
|---|---|---|---|---|---|---|
| G | 1 | Lauren Swann | 5 ft 7 in (1.7 m) | Jr | Arizona | Queens, NY |
| G | 5 | Deja Young | 5 ft 9 in (1.75 m) | Sr | Hampton | Teaneck, NJ |
| F | 7 | Precious Gem Wheeler | 6 ft 3 in (1.91 m) | So | Franklin | Franklin, NJ |
| G/F | 22 | Zachara Perkins | 6 ft 3 in (1.91 m) | Jr | Summer Creek | Houston, TX |
| F | 30 | Imani Lester | 6 ft 3 in (1.91 m) | Sr | Kansas State | Raleigh, NC |
| G | 33 | Kennedy Brandt | 5 ft 10 in (1.78 m) | Sr | Glenbard West | Glen Ellyn, IL |
| G | 44 | Tara Dye | 5 ft 10 in (1.78 m) | Sr | Purdue | Newark, NJ |
| G | 3 | Mia Pauldo | 5 ft 6 in (1.68 m) | So | Tennessee | Paterson, NJ |
| G | 2 | Mya Pauldo | 5 ft 6 in (1.68 m) | So | Tennessee | Paterson, NJ |
| F | tbd | Fatima Diakhate | 6 ft 5 in (1.96 m) | Sr | Pittsburgh | Dakar, SEN |
| F | 24 | Zennia Thomas | 6 ft 2 in (1.88 m) | Sr | Howard | Cleveland, OH |
| G | 10 | Jaylah Lampley | 6 ft 1 in (1.85 m) | So | Mississippi State | Fishers, IN |

Head coach

- Gary Redus II (South Alabama)

Assistant coach(es)

- Daphne Mitchell (Georgia Tech)
- Manisha Redus (Alabama)
- Preston Beverly (VMI)
- LaDazhia Williams (LSU)
- Lauren Hansen (Michigan)

Legend

- (C) Team captain
- (S) Suspended
- (I) Ineligible
- (W) Walk-on
- Injured
- Current redshirt

== Year by year results ==
| Season | Team | Overall | Conference | Standing | Postseason | Coaches' poll | AP poll |
|---|---|---|---|---|---|---|---|
Ellen Johns (Independent) (1974–1975)
| 1974–75 | Ellen Johns | 6–5 | – | | | | |
| Ellen Johns: | | 6–5 | – | | | | |
Dottie McCrea (Independent) (1975–1976)
| 1975–76 | Dottie McCrea | 5–9 | – | | | | |
| Dottie McCrea: | | 5–9 | – | | | | |
Theresa Grentz (Independent) (1976–1981)
| 1976–77 | Theresa Grentz | 17–11 | – | | | | |
| 1977–78 | Theresa Grentz | 16–12 | – | | | | |
| 1978–79 | Theresa Grentz | 26–4 | – | | AIAW Consolation | | 7 |
| 1979–80 | Theresa Grentz | 28–5 | – | | AIAW Quarterfinals | | 8 |
| 1980–81 | Theresa Grentz | 27–6 | – | | AIAW second round | | 9 |
| 1981–82 | Theresa Grentz | 25–7 | – | | AIAW Champions | | 8 |
| 1982–83 | Theresa Grentz | 19–10 | – | | | | |
| Theresa Grentz: | | 160–55 | – | | | | |
Theresa Grentz (Atlantic 10 Conference) (1983–1995)
| 1983–84 | Theresa Grentz | 20–9 | 7–1 | 1st | | | |
| 1984–85 | Theresa Grentz | 19–9 | 5–3 | T-4th | | | |
| 1985–86 | Theresa Grentz | 29–4 | 16–0 | 1st | NCAA Elite Eight | | 10 |
| 1986–87 | Theresa Grentz | 30–3 | 17–1 | 1st | NCAA Elite Eight | | 5 |
| 1987–88 | Theresa Grentz | 27–5 | 17–1 | 1st | NCAA Sweet Sixteen | | 8 |
| 1988–89 | Theresa Grentz | 24–7 | 16–2 | T-1st | NCAA Second Round | | |
| 1989–90 | Theresa Grentz | 20–10 | 16–2 | T-1st | NCAA First Round | | |
| 1990–91 | Theresa Grentz | 23–7 | 15–3 | T-2nd | NCAA First Round | | 20 |
| 1991–92 | Theresa Grentz | 21–11 | 11–5 | T-2nd | NCAA Second Round | | |
| 1992–93 | Theresa Grentz | 22–9 | 12–2 | 1st | NCAA Second Round | | |
| 1993–94 | Theresa Grentz | 22–8 | 13–3 | T-1st | NCAA First Round | | |
| 1994–95 | Theresa Grentz | 17–13 | 11–5 | T-3rd | | | |
| Theresa Grentz: | | 274–95 | 156–28 | | | | |
C. Vivian Stringer (Big East Conference) (1995–2013)
| 1995–96 | C. Vivian Stringer | 13–15 | 8–10 | 5th (BE7) | | | |
| 1996–97 | C. Vivian Stringer | 11–17 | 8–10 | T-2nd (BE7) | | | |
| 1997–98 | C. Vivian Stringer | 22–10 | 14–4 | 1st (BE7) | NCAA Sweet Sixteen | | |
| 1998–1999 | C. Vivian Stringer | 29–6 | 17–1 | T-1st | NCAA Elite Eight | | 9 |
| 1999–2000 | C. Vivian Stringer | 26–8 | 12–4 | T-3rd | NCAA Final Four | 4 | 8 |
| 2000–01 | C. Vivian Stringer | 23–8 | 13–3 | 3rd | NCAA Second Round | 17 | 11 |
| 2001–02 | C. Vivian Stringer | 9–20 | 5–11 | 11th | | | |
| 2002–03 | C. Vivian Stringer | 21–8 | 13–3 | 2nd | NCAA Second Round | | 23 |
| 2003–04 | C. Vivian Stringer | 21–12 | 10–6 | T-6th | NCAA First Round | | |
| 2004–05 | C. Vivian Stringer | 28–7 | 14–2 | 1st | NCAA Elite Eight | 7 | 9 |
| 2005–06 | C. Vivian Stringer | 27–5 | 16–0 | 1st | NCAA Sweet Sixteen | 9 | 9 |
| 2006–07 | C. Vivian Stringer | 27–9 | 12–4 | T-2nd | NCAA Runner-up | 2 | 15 |
| 2007–08 | C. Vivian Stringer | 27–7 | 14–2 | 3rd | NCAA Elite Eight | 6 | 7 |
| 2008–09 | C. Vivian Stringer | 21–13 | 9–7 | 7th | NCAA Sweet Sixteen | 21 | |
| 2009–10 | C. Vivian Stringer | 18–15 | 9–7 | T–6th | NCAA First Round | | |
| 2010–11 | C. Vivian Stringer | 20–13 | 11–5 | 4th | NCAA Second Round | | |
| 2011–12 | C. Vivian Stringer | 22–10 | 10–6 | 6th | NCAA First Round | | 23 |
| 2012–13 | C. Vivian Stringer | 16–14 | 7–9 | T-9th | | | |
| C. Vivian Stringer: | | 381–197 | 202–94 | | | | |
C. Vivian Stringer (American Athletic Conference) (2013–2014)
| 2013–14 | C. Vivian Stringer | 28–9 | 12–6 | 4th | WNIT Champions | | |
| C. Vivian Stringer: | | 28–9 | 12–6 | | | | |
C. Vivian Stringer (Big Ten Conference) (2014–2022)
| 2014–15 | C. Vivian Stringer | 23–10 | 12–6 | T-4th | NCAA Second Round | 22 | |
| 2015–16 | C. Vivian Stringer | 19–15 | 7–9 | T-9th | WNIT Second Round | | |
| 2016–17 | C. Vivian Stringer | 6–24 | 3–13 | T-11th | | | |
| 2017–18 | C. Vivian Stringer | 20–12 | 7–9 | T-9th | | | |
| 2018–19 | C. Vivian Stringer | 22–10 | 13–5 | 3rd | NCAA First Round | | |
| 2019–20 | C. Vivian Stringer | 22–9 | 11–7 | T-5th | Cancelled due to Covid-19 | | |
| 2020–21 | C. Vivian Stringer | 14–5 | 10–3 | 3rd | NCAA First Round | | 21 |
| 2021–22 | C. Vivian Stringer | 11–20 | 3–14 | 13th | | | |
| C. Vivian Stringer: | | 137–105 | 66–66 | | | | |
Coquese Washington (Big Ten Conference) (2022–2026)
| 2022–23 | Coquese Washington | 12–20 | 5–13 | 11th | | | |
| 2023–24 | Coquese Washington | 8–24 | 2–16 | 14th | | | |
| 2024–25 | Coquese Washington | 13–20 | 3–15 | 15th | WNIT Great 8 | | |
| 2025–26 | Coquese Washington | 9–20 | 1–17 | 18th | | | |
| Coquese Washington: | | 42–84 | 11–61 | | | | |
Gary Redus II (Big Ten Conference) (2026–present)
| 2026–27 | Gary Redus II | 0–0 | 0–0 | | | | |
| Gary Redus II: | | 0–0 | 0–0 | | | | |
| Total: | | 1033–559 | | | | | |
National champion Postseason invitational champion Conference regular season champion Conference regular season and conference tournament champion Division regular season champion Division regular season and conference tournament champion Conference tournament champion

== Postseason results ==
=== NCAA Division I ===
Rutgers has appeared in the NCAA Division I women's basketball tournament 26 times. They have a record of 36–26.

| Year | Seed | Round | Opponent | Result |
|---|---|---|---|---|
| 1986 | #2 | Second Round; Sweet Sixteen; Elite Eight | #7 Villanova #3 Penn State #4 W. Kentucky | W 85–58; W 85–72; L 74–89 |
| 1987 | #2 | Second Round; Sweet Sixteen; Elite Eight | #7 Duke #3 NC State #1 Texas | W 78–64; W 75–60; L 77–85 |
| 1988 | #3 | Second Round; Sweet Sixteen | #6 Old Dominion #2 Virginia | W 88–78; L 75–89 |
| 1989 | #7 | First Round; Second Round | #10 Southern Miss #2 NC State | W 95–73; L 73–75 |
| 1990 | #11 | First Round | #6 Vanderbilt | L 75–78 |
| 1991 | #6 | First Round | #11 Toledo | L 65–83 |
| 1992 | #8 | First Round; Second Round | #9 Southern Miss #1 Tennessee | W 93–63; L 56–97 |
| 1993 | #9 | First Round; Second Round | #8 Vermont #1 Ohio State | W 80–74; L 60–91 |
| 1994 | #5 | First Round | #12 W. Kentucky | L 73–84 |
| 1998 | #5 | First Round; Second Round; Sweet Sixteen | #12 Oregon #4 Iowa State #1 Tennessee | W 79–76; W 62–61; L 60–92 |
| 1999 | #3 | First Round; Second Round; Sweet Sixteen; Elite Eight | #14 Dartmouth #6 Arizona #2 Texas Tech #1 Purdue | W 84–70; W 90–47; W 53–42; L 62–75 |
| 2000 | #2 | First Round; Second Round; Sweet Sixteen; Elite Eight; Final Four | #15 Holy Cross #10 St. Joseph's #11 UAB #1 Georgia #1 Tennessee | W 91–70; W 59–39; W 60–45; W 59–51; L 54–64 |
| 2001 | #4 | First Round; Second Round | #13 Stephen F. Austin #5 SW Missouri State | W 80–43; L 53–60 |
| 2003 | #4 | First Round; Second Round | #13 W. Kentucky #5 Georgia | W 64–52; L 64–74 |
| 2004 | #7 | First Round | #10 Chattanooga | L 69–74 |
| 2005 | #3 | First Round; Second Round; Sweet Sixteen; Elite Eight | #14 Hartford #6 Temple #2 Ohio State #1 Tennessee | W 62–37; W 61–54; W 64–58; L 49–59 |
| 2006 | #3 | First Round; Second Round; Sweet Sixteen | #14 Dartmouth #11 TCU #2 Tennessee | W 63–58; W 82–48; L 69–76 |
| 2007 | #4 | First Round; Second Round; Sweet Sixteen; Elite Eight; Final Four; Title Game | #13 East Carolina #5 Michigan State #1 Duke #3 Arizona State #3 LSU #1 Tennessee | W 77–34; W 70–57; W 53–52; W 64–45; W 59–35; L 46–59 |
| 2008 | #2 | First Round; Second Round; Sweet Sixteen; Elite Eight | #15 Robert Morris #7 Iowa State #6 George Washington #1 Connecticut | W 85–42; W 69–58; W 53–42; L 56–66 |
| 2009 | #7 | First Round; Second Round; Sweet Sixteen | #10 VCU #2 Auburn #6 Purdue | W 57–51; W 80–52; L 61–67 |
| 2010 | #9 | First Round | #8 Iowa | L 63–70 |
| 2011 | #7 | First Round; Second Round | #10 Louisiana Tech #2 Texas A&M | W 76–51; L 48–70 |
| 2012 | #6 | First Round | #11 Gonzaga | L 73–86 |
| 2015 | #8 | First Round; Second Round | #9 Seton Hall #1 Connecticut | W 79–66; L 55–91 |
| 2019 | #7 | First Round | #10 Buffalo | L 71–82 |
| 2021 | #6 | First Round | #11 BYU | L 66–69 |

=== AIAW Division I ===
The Scarlet Knights made four appearances in the AIAW National Division I basketball tournament, with a combined record of 7–4.

| Year | Round | Opponent | Result |
|---|---|---|---|
| 1979 | First Round; Quarterfinals | Tennessee; Long Beach State | W 73–66; L 51–69 |
| 1980 | First Round; Quarterfinals | Central Missouri State; Providence; Old Dominion | W 87–75; W 70–54; L 62–84 |
| 1981 | First Round; Quarterfinals | Clemson; Long Beach State | W 99–76; L 73–77 |
| 1982 | First Round; Quarterfinals; Semifinals; Championship Game | Georgia Southern; Minnesota; Villanova; Texas | W 89–79; W 83–75; W 83–75; W 83–77 |

== Notable Players ==
=== Scarlet Knights drafted to the WNBA ===
| Player | Draft | Seasons | Teams |
|---|---|---|---|
| Erica Wheeler | 2013 | 13 | Atlanta Dream, New York Liberty, Indiana Fever, Los Angeles Sparks, Atlanta Dream, Indiana Fever, Seattle Storm, Los Angeles Sparks |
| Kahleah Copper | 2016 | 11 | Washington Mystics, Chicago Sky, Phoenix Mercury |
| Betnijah Laney-Hamilton | 2015 | 12 | Chicago Sky, Connecticut Sun, Indiana Fever, Atlanta Dream, New York Liberty, Washington Mystics |
| Essence Carson | 2008 | 7 | New York Liberty, Los Angeles Sparks, Phoenix Mercury, Washington Mystics, Connecticut Sun |
| Epiphanny Prince | 2010 | 14 | Chicago Sky, New York Liberty, Las Vegas Aces, Seattle Storm |
| Cappie Pondexter | 2006 | 12 | Phoenix Mercury, New York Liberty, Chicago Sky, Los Angeles Sparks, Indiana Fever |
| Arella Guirantes | 2021 | 2 | Los Angeles Sparks, Seattle Storm |
| Rachel Hollivay | 2016 | 1 | Atlanta Dream |
| Matee Ajavon | 2008 | 9 | Houston Comets, Washington Mystics, Atlanta Dream |
| Sue Wicks | 1997 | 5 | New York Liberty |
| Tasha Pointer | 2001 | 4 | Portland Fire, New York Liberty |
| Rachel Hollivay | 2016 | 2 | Atlanta Dream |
