= Chris Weller =

American basketball player and coach

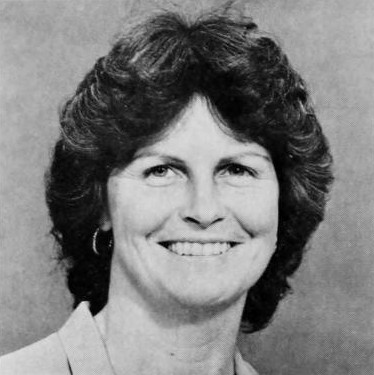
- Weller, circa 1985–86

Biographical details
- Born: July 12, 1944 (age 82)
- Education: Maryland

Playing career
- 1963–1966: Maryland

Coaching career (HC unless noted)
- 1975–2002: Maryland

Head coaching record
- Overall: 499–286 (.636)

Accomplishments and honors

Awards
- 2× NCAA Regional—Final Four (1982, 1989); National Coach of the Year (ACC and American Sports Foundation) (1989); Naismith College Coach of the Year (1992); USBWA National Coach of the Year (1992)
- Women's Basketball Hall of Fame
Medal record
Women's basketball
Head coach for United States
William Jones Cup
Gold medal – first place	1992 Taipei	Team competition

Chris Weller (born July 12, 1944) is a former University of Maryland, College Park women's basketball coach who led the Lady Terps for 27 seasons from 1975 until 2002. Weller was inducted into the Women's Basketball Hall of Fame in 2010.

== Education ==
Weller attended the University of Maryland in the 1960s, graduating in 1966. During her time as a student, she participated in basketball, swimming, and lacrosse.

She was a four-year varsity letterwinner in basketball. After graduation, Weller taught and coached at John F. Kennedy High School in Silver Spring, Maryland. In 1973, she returned to the University of Maryland to earn her master's degree, and at the same time became an assistant under her predecessor, Dottie McKnight. In 1975, while Weller was still an assistant, the team won their second state championship.

== Career ==
Weller became the Terps' head coach in 1975, and served as the University of Maryland's first Assistant Athletic Director for Women from 1975 until 1980. During her tenure, the Terps' record was 499–286 (.636). Her teams attained many notable achievements, including eight ACC championships, two NCAA Final 4 appearances, and one AIAW Final Four appearance. In 1978, Weller led the Terps in winning the first ever women's basketball ACC tournament championship. Many of Weller's players have gone on to experience personal success as well. Her teams produced five Olympians, three Kodak All-Americans, 28 athletes who have participated on national teams, and several players who were active in professional basketball. In 2002, Weller retired as head coach, and was replaced by the current women's basketball coach, Brenda Frese.

Outside of her Maryland coaching career, Weller was also an assistant coach for the U.S. National Jones Cup Team in 1985 and the head coach of the U.S. Select Team in 1986, 1992 and 1994. She is an advocate for the growth of women's basketball in Maryland, and promoted the formation of the Maryland Coaches' Association. Weller has also served as the chairperson of the WBCA Legislative Committee and the committee chairperson of EAIAW Basketball. Weller was also a member of the Kodak All-American Committee and the U.S. Olympic Committee.

== USA Basketball ==
Weller was selected as an assistant coach of the team representing the US in 1985 at the William Jones Cup competition in Taipei, Taiwan. The team opened with a lopsided 92–18 victory over the Philippines, then faced Sweden in the second game. The game was close in the first half, and the half ended with the game tied at 31 points each. The USA pulled out to a six-point lead early in the second half but Sweden responded by scoring thirteen consecutive points to take a lead they would not relinquish. The USA team next faced undefeated South Korea. The game was tied again at the half, but this time the USA took a lead in the second half and held on to the lead for the win. They next played undefeated Republic of China and managed to come away with a win by the slimmest of margins, 56–55. After defeating Germany, they had another challenge from Canada, who raced out to a 42–30 lead by halftime. The Canadians still had a twelve-point lead late in the game, but the USA mounted a comeback, and out scored their opponent 18–4 to win the game 65–63. After beating Brazil, they faced Japan in the final game of the competition. Japan was in the lead with five minutes to go in the game, but the USA came back to win with a two-point margin 56–54. The win clinched the championship and the gold medal for the USA team.

Weller was selected as the head coach of the team representing the US in 1992 at the William Jones Cup competition in Taipei, Taiwan. The USA team started out with an eight-point win over Japan, then won their next five with double-digit margins. In their game against Australia, they trailed at halftime, but came back to win by ten points. In their next-to-last game, the USA faced South Korea, who gave the USA the toughest challenge yet, but the USA prevailed 91–84. The final game, for the gold medal, was a rematch against Australia. The score was tied late in the first half, but the USA team finished the half with seven straight point, taking a lead they would not give up. The USA completed the competition with an 8–0 record and won the gold medal. Lisa Leslie, at age 19 was playing in her first Jones cup competition. She was the leading scorer and rebounder on the USA team.

== Personal life ==
Chris Weller is living with her pets, a cat named Jasper and Shih Tzu Buddy in Silver Spring.

== Awards and honors ==
- She was named the ACC and American Sports Foundation's National Coach of the Year in 1989.
- She was named the Naismith College Coach of the Year, the United States Basketball Writers Association National Coach of the Year, and the ACC National Coach of the Year in 1992.
- She was inducted into the Women's Basketball Hall of Fame as part of the class of 2010.
