= Cathy Boswell =

American basketball player

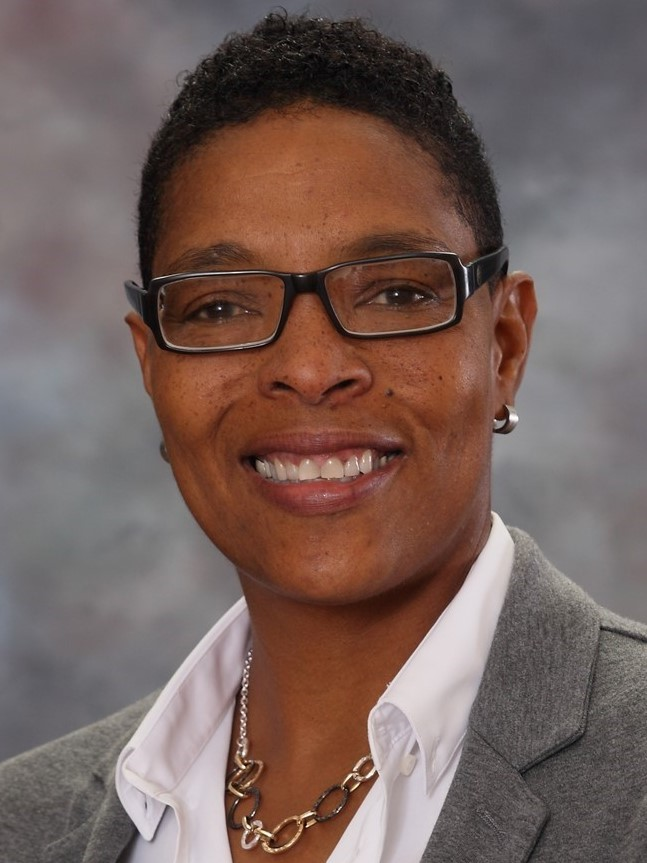

Personal information
- Full name: Catherine La Ora Boswell
- Born: November 10, 1962 (age 63) Joliet, Illinois, U.S.
- Height: 5 ft 9 in (175 cm)

Sport
- University team: Illinois State Redbirds 1979–83
Medal record
Women's basketball
Representing the United States
Olympic Games
Gold medal – first place	1984 Los Angeles	Team competition
World University Games
Gold medal – first place	1983 Edmonton	Team competition
Jones Cup
Bronze medal – third place	1980 Taipei	Team competition
Silver medal – second place	1982 Taipei	Team competition
Gold medal – first place	1984 Taipei	Team competition

Catherine La Ora Boswell (born November 10, 1962) is an American former basketball player who competed in the 1984 Summer Olympics. She played college basketball for Illinois State University before playing professionally around the world. She has 31 years of competitive basketball experience, including 24 years of professional basketball.

== Illinois State University ==
Boswell played for the Illinois State Redbirds from 1979 to 1983. She came to Illinois State as a 16-year-old freshman and, in her first year, the Redbirds quadrupled their overall win total and tripled their Missouri Valley Conference win total from the previous year. During her first two seasons at Illinois State, she led the Redbirds to a 51–18 record, an AIAW State Championship, and a WNIT bid. She surpassed 1,000 points in her first two years and has held the ISU freshman and sophomore records for scoring average, field goals, and rebounds. Boswell led the Redbirds to 90 wins during her career. She was the first Redbird to eclipse 2,000 points and is the ISU career record-holder in field goals and rebounding average. She is also in the top-10 for scoring, assists, blocks, and steals.

During her time at ISU, she was a two-time WBCA Kodak All-American and two-time Wade Trophy finalist. She finished her collegiate career with an NCAA Tournament berth in 1983, a 15th-place finish in the AIAW National Tournament in 1981, and two WNIT bids in 1980 and 1982.

In 1997 Boswell was officially inducted into the Illinois State University athletic department's hall of fame. Her ISU number is retired and hanging in the rafters of Redbird Arena.

Boswell returned to her alma mater to join the women's basketball staff as an assistant coach in 2015. She was later placed into the Women’s Basketball Hall of Fame in 2023.

== USA Basketball ==
Boswell was named to the team representing the USA at the 1980 William Jones Cup competition in Taipei, Taiwan. The USA team ended with a 7–2 record, which was a three-way tie for first place. The tie-breaker was point differential, and the USA did not win the tie-breaker, so ended up with the bronze medal. She was also named to the squad presenting the USA in 1982. The team won their first seven games, but then ran into undefeated Canada, who beat the USA 70–67, leaving the USA with the silver medal.

In 1983, Boswell represented the USA on the World University games team, coached by Jill Hutchison and held in Edmonton, Alberta, Canada. Although the USA lost to Romania in the preliminary rounds, and had to win every remaining game to remain in contention for a medal, the USA team bounced back to win a close game against Yugoslavia 86–85 and a rematch against Romania. The USA team was behind at halftime, but came back in the second half to win the game 83–61 and the gold medal. Boswell averaged 4.7 points per game.

In 1984, the USA sent its national team to the 1984 William Jones Cup competition in Taipei, Taiwan, for pre-Olympic practice. The team easily beat each of the eight teams they played, winning by an average of just under 50 points per game. Boswell averaged 7.0 points per game.

She continued with the national team to represent the USA at the 1984 Olympics. The team won all six games to claim the gold medal. Boswell averaged 4.0 points per game.

== Achievements ==
- 1979 Wyle White Award winner
- Illinois State University’s highest field goal percentage (.599)
- Illinois State University’s most free throws scored (101)
- Illinois State University’s most free throws attempted (119)
- Illinois State University’s highest free throw percentage (.848)
- Illinois State University’s most field goals scored (274)
- Led ISU Redbirds to 90 wins and NCAA Tournament berth in 1983
- Member of 1984 Women’s Olympic Basketball team
- Two-time Kodak All-Region selection
- Two-time Wade Trophy finalist
- Two-time WBCA All-American
