= Lea Henry =

American basketball player (born 1961)

Personal information
- Born: November 22, 1961 (age 64) Colquitt, Georgia, U.S.
- Listed height: 5 ft 4 in (163 cm)

Career information
- College: Tennessee

Career history

Coaching
- 1989–1990: Florida
- 1990–1994: Mercer
- 1995–2010: Georgia State

Career highlights
- 3x Atlantic Sun Coach of the Year (1991, 1992, 2000)
Medals
Women's basketball
Representing the United States
Olympic Games
Gold medal – first place	1984 Los Angeles	Team competition
World University Games
Gold medal – first place	1981 Bucharest	Team competition
Gold medal – first place	1983 Edmonton	Team competition
Jones Cup
Gold medal – first place	1984 Taipei	Team competition
Silver medal – second place	1982 Taipei	Team competition
Bronze medal – third place	1980 Taipei	Team competition

Ludi "Lea" Henry (born November 22, 1961) is an American former basketball player who competed in the 1984 Summer Olympics.

== USA Basketball ==
Henry was chosen to represent the USA on the USA Basketball team at the 1981 World University games, held in Bucharest, Romania and coached by Kay Yow. After winning the opening game, the USA was challenged by China, who held a halftime lead. The USA came back to win by two points, helped by 26 points from Denise Curry. The USA also was challenged by Canada, who led at halftime, but the USA won by three points 79–76. The USA beat host team Romania to set up a match with undefeated Russia for the gold medal. The Russian team was too strong, and won the gold, leaving the US with the silver medal. Henry averaged 5.1 points per game.

Henry traveled to Taiwan with the team representing the US at the 1980 Women's R. William Jones Cup competition. The team had a record of 7–2, and won the bronze medal. Henry returned with the USA team to the Jones Cup competition in 1982. This time, the USA posted a 7–1 record to earn the silver medal. Henry was the leading scorer for the USA team with 19.6 points per game which earned her a position on the Jones Cup All-Tournament team. Henry also competed in the 1984 Jones Cup tournament. The USA sent the 1984 Olympic team to the tournament as part of their pre-Olympic training. This team won all eight games to earn the gold medal.

Henry also played on the 1981 and 1983 World University Games teams, both coached by Jill Hutchison. She helped each team win the gold medal for the USA.
