= Amy Ruley =

American basketball player and coach

Biographical details
- Born: October 24, 1955 (age 71); Lowell, Indiana, U.S.

Playing career
- 1975–1978: Purdue
- Position: Point guard

Coaching career (HC unless noted)
- 1979–2008: North Dakota State

Head coaching record
- Overall: 671–198
- Women's Basketball Hall of Fame
Medal record
Women’s Basketball
Assistant coach for United States
William Jones Cup
Bronze medal – third place	1995 Taipei, Taiwan	Team competition

Amy Ruley (born October 24, 1955) is a former women's head basketball coach at North Dakota State University. Ruley has the greatest number of victories of any women's coach at NDSU, with over 600 wins, and led the Bison to 5 NCAA Division II championships. She was inducted into the Women's Basketball Hall of Fame in 2004. She is a graduate of Purdue University, where she was a member of the first varsity Purdue Boilermakers team, scoring the program's first points.

On Monday, March 3, 2008, Ruley announced that she would step down as coach after the game that evening against Centenary College (La.) and remained at NDSU until August 2017. She joined the Minnesota State University of Moorhead (MSUM) Foundation as Senior Director of Development for Athletics in 2017. She had since joined the Sanford Health Foundation in 2019, with plans to retire in February 2022.

== Purdue statistics ==
Legend
GP	Games played	GS	Games started	MPG	Minutes per game
FG%	Field goal percentage	3P%	3-point field goal percentage	FT%	Free throw percentage
RPG	Rebounds per game	APG	Assists per game	SPG	Steals per game
BPG	Blocks per game	PPG	Points per game	**Bold**	Career high

Year	Team	GP	Points	FG%	FT%	RPG	APG	SPG	PPG
1975–76	Purdue	16	117	0.0%	39.2%	1.9	0.6	0.0	7.3
1976–77	Purdue	**23**	**212**	40.5%	**73.9%**	2.2	**2.9**	**1.7**	**9.2**
1977–78	Purdue	19	131	**54.0%**	31.4%	**2.5**	1.7	1.4	6.9
Career	Purdue	58	460	0.0%	51.4%	1.9	1.9	1.1	7.9

== USA Basketball ==
In 1995, Ruley served as the assistant coach to the R. William Jones Cup Team. The competition was held in Taipei, Taiwan. The USA team won its first six games, but four of the six were won by single-digit margins. Their seventh game was against Russia, and they fell 100–84. The final game was against South Korea, and a victory would assure the gold medal, but the South Korean team won 80–76 to win the gold medal. The USA team won the bronze medal.

== Awards ==
- 1997 – Carol Eckman Award
- 2000 – Inducted into North Dakota Sports Hall of Fame
- 2001 – Coach Ruley received the United States Sports Academy's C. Vivian Stringer Coaching Award in recognition of her outstanding achievements as a coach.
- 2004 – Inducted into Purdue Boilermakers Athletic Hall of Fame
- 2004 – Women's Basketball Hall of Fame

== Head coaching record ==
Record table
Season	Team	Overall	Conference	Standing	Postseason
**North Dakota State** (North Central Conference) (1979–2006)
1979–1980	North Dakota State	14–15	0–0	4th	
1980–1981	North Dakota State	19–12	0–0	5th	Region
1981–1982	North Dakota State	22–10	0–0	2nd	4th
1982–1983	North Dakota State	16–10	0–0	3rd	
1983–1984	North Dakota State	15–12	0–0	4th	
1984–1985	North Dakota State	19–8	0–0	4th	
1985–1986	North Dakota State	24–9	0–0	2nd	2nd
1986–1987	North Dakota State	26–4	0–0	1st	t-5th
1987–1988	North Dakota State	28–3	0–0	1st	t-3rd
1988–1989	North Dakota State	23–7	0–0	1st	Region
1989–1990	North Dakota State	25–5	0–0	2nd	Region
1990–1991	North Dakota State	31–2	0–0	2nd	1st
1991–1992	North Dakota State	29–4	0–0	1st	2nd
1992–1993	North Dakota State	30–2	0–0	1st	1st
1993–1994	North Dakota State	27–5	0–0	2nd	1st
1994–1995	North Dakota State	32–0	0–0	1st	1st
1995–1996	North Dakota State	30–2	0–0	1st	1st
1996–1997	North Dakota State	28–1	0–0	1st	Region
1997–1998	North Dakota State	22–6	0–0	2nd	Region
1998–1999	North Dakota State	24–5	0–0	2nd	Region
1999–2000	North Dakota State	28–4	0–0	1st	2nd
2000–2001	North Dakota State	25–8	0–0	2nd	Region
2001–2002	North Dakota State	18–10	0–0	t-3rd	
2002–2003	North Dakota State	26–7	0–0	t-3rd	Region
2003–2004	North Dakota State	24–7	0–0	t-1st	Region
2004–2005	North Dakota State	26–1	0–0		
2005–2006	North Dakota State	9–17	0–0		
2006–2007	North Dakota State	14–11	0–0		
**North Dakota State** (The Summit League) (2007–present)
2007–2008	North Dakota State	17–11	12–6	T2nd	
Total:		671–198			
National champion Postseason invitational champion Conference regular season champion Conference regular season and conference tournament champion Division regular season champion Division regular season and conference tournament champion Conference tournament champion

== See also ==
- List of college women's basketball career coaching wins leaders
