= Southern Miss Lady Eagles basketball =

Southern Miss Lady Eagles women's basketball
2025–26 Southern Miss Lady Eagles basketball team
- University: University of Southern Mississippi
- Head coach: Missy Bilderback (1st season)
- Location: Hattiesburg, Mississippi
- Arena: Reed Green Coliseum (capacity: 8,095)
- Conference: Sun Belt
- Nickname: Lady Eagles
- Colors: Black and gold

NCAA Division I tournament Sweet Sixteen
- 1994

NCAA Division I tournament appearances
- 1985, 1987, 1989, 1990, 1992, 1994, 1995, 1996

Conference tournament champions
- 1987, 1990, 1992, 1995

Conference regular-season champions
- Metro: 1989, 1993, 1994; Sun Belt: 2022

Uniforms
Home	Away	Alternate

The Southern Miss Lady Eagles women's basketball team represents the University of Southern Mississippi in women's basketball. The school competes in the Sun Belt Conference in Division I of the National Collegiate Athletic Association (NCAA). The Lady Eagles play home basketball games at Reed Green Coliseum in Hattiesburg, Mississippi.

== History ==
As of the end of the 2022–23 season, the Lady Eagles have a 801–598 all-time record.

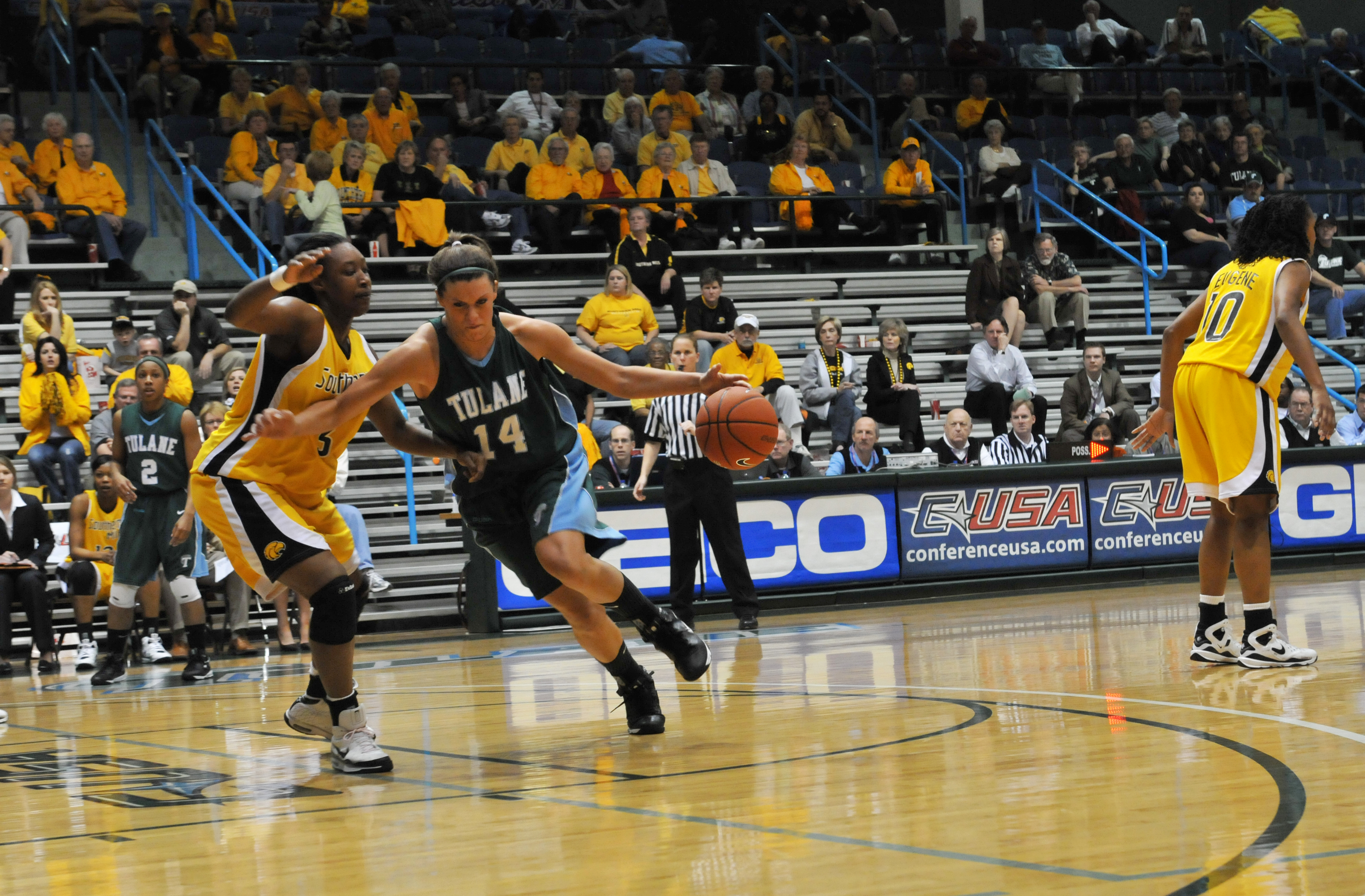
Southern Miss (in gold kit) vs Tulane game in 2009

Season	Record	Conference Record	Coach
1975–76	5–14	n/a	Bob McBee
1976–77	16–14	n/a	Bob McBee & Hershal Peddicord
1977–78	15–10	n/a	Kay James
1978–79	16–10	n/a	Kay James
1979–80	15–11	n/a	Kay James
1980–81	22–7	n/a	Kay James
1981–82	16–11	n/a	Kay James
1982–83	17–10	n/a	Kay James
1983–84	18–10	5–5 (4th in Metro)	Kay James
1984–85	21–9	8–2 (T-2nd in Metro)	Kay James
1985–86	12–15	4–6 (T-4th in Metro)	Kay James
1986–87	21–9	6–6 (4th in Metro)	Kay James
1987–88	12–16	6–6 (4th in Metro)	Kay James
1988–89	26–5	10–2 (T-1st in Metro)	Kay James
1989–90	27–5	11–3 (2nd in Metro)	Kay James
1990–91	17–12	8–6 (T-4th in Metro)	Kay James
1991–92	21–10	9–2 (2nd in Metro)	Kay James
1992–93	20–8	10–2 (1st in Metro)	Kay James
1993–94	26–5	10–2 (1st in Metro)	Kay James
1994–95	21–9	7–5 (T-3rd in Metro)	Kay James
1995–96	22–8	11–3 (2nd in Conference USA)	Kay James
1996–97	13–14	6–8 (7th in Conference USA)	Kay James
1997–98	14–13	8–8 (6th in Conference USA)	Kay James
1998–99	11–17	5–11 (10th in Conference USA)	Kay James
1999-00	17–13	10–6 (4th in Conference USA)	Rick Reeves
2000–01	12–16	5–11 (10th in Conference USA)	Rick Reeves
2001–02	11–17	4–10 (11th in Conference USA)	Rick Reeves
2002–03	14–15	6–8 (8th in Conference USA)	Rick Reeves
2003–04	14–13	2–12 (T-13th in Conference USA)	Rick Reeves
2004–05	9–19	3–11 (12th in Conference USA)	Joye Lee-McNelis
2005–06	14–15	10–6 (4th in Conference USA)	Joye Lee-McNelis
2006–07	15–15	9–7 (T-6th in Conference USA)	Joye Lee-McNelis
2007–08	21–14	8–8 (5th in Conference USA)	Joye Lee-McNelis
2008–09	20–12	11–5 (T-2nd in Conference USA)	Joye Lee-McNelis
2009–10	9–21	5–11 (12th in Conference USA)	Joye Lee-McNelis
2010–11	10–20	5–11 (11th in Conference USA)	Joye Lee-McNelis
2011–12	13–18	6–10 (T-9th in Conference USA)	Joye Lee-McNelis
2012–13	15–16	6–10 (T-10th in Conference USA)	Joye Lee-McNelis
2013–14	27–7	13–3 (2nd in Conference USA)	Joye Lee-McNelis
2014–15	25–11	13–3 (2nd in Conference USA)	Joye Lee-McNelis
2015–16	14–16	7–11 (9th in Conference USA)	Joye Lee-McNelis
2016–17	23–11	13–5 (3rd in Conference USA)	Joye Lee-McNelis
2017–18	15–15	7–9 (7th in Conference USA)	Joye Lee-McNelis
2018–19	18–14	9–7 (T-7th in Conference USA)	Joye Lee-McNelis
2019–20	15–15	7–11 (T-8th in Conference USA)	Joye Lee-McNelis
2020–21	7–12	5–11 (5th in Conference USA (West))	Joye Lee-McNelis
2021–22	18–12	9–8 (3rd in Conference USA (West))	Joye Lee-McNelis
2022–23	21–10	13–5 (T-1st in Sun Belt)	Joye Lee-McNelis

== NCAA tournament results ==
Southern Miss has reached the NCAA Division I women's basketball tournament eight times. They have a record of 4–8.

Year	Seed	Round	Opponent	Result
1985	#7	First Round	#2 Ole Miss	L 68–81
1987	#10	First Round	#7 Tennessee Tech	L 66–78
1989	#10	First Round	#7 Rutgers	L 73–95
1990	#8	First Round; Second Round	#9 LSU #1 Louisiana Tech	W 75–65; L 70–89
1992	#9	First Round	#8 Rutgers	L 63–93
1994	#4	First Round; Second Round; Sweet Sixteen	#13 Tennessee State #12 Western Kentucky #1 Connecticut	W 86–72; W 72–69; L 64–78
1995	#7	First Round	#10 SMU	L 95–96 (OT)
1996	#9	First Round; Second Round	#8 Utah #1 Louisiana Tech	W 74–66; L 46–84
