= Kay James (basketball) =

American basketball player and coach

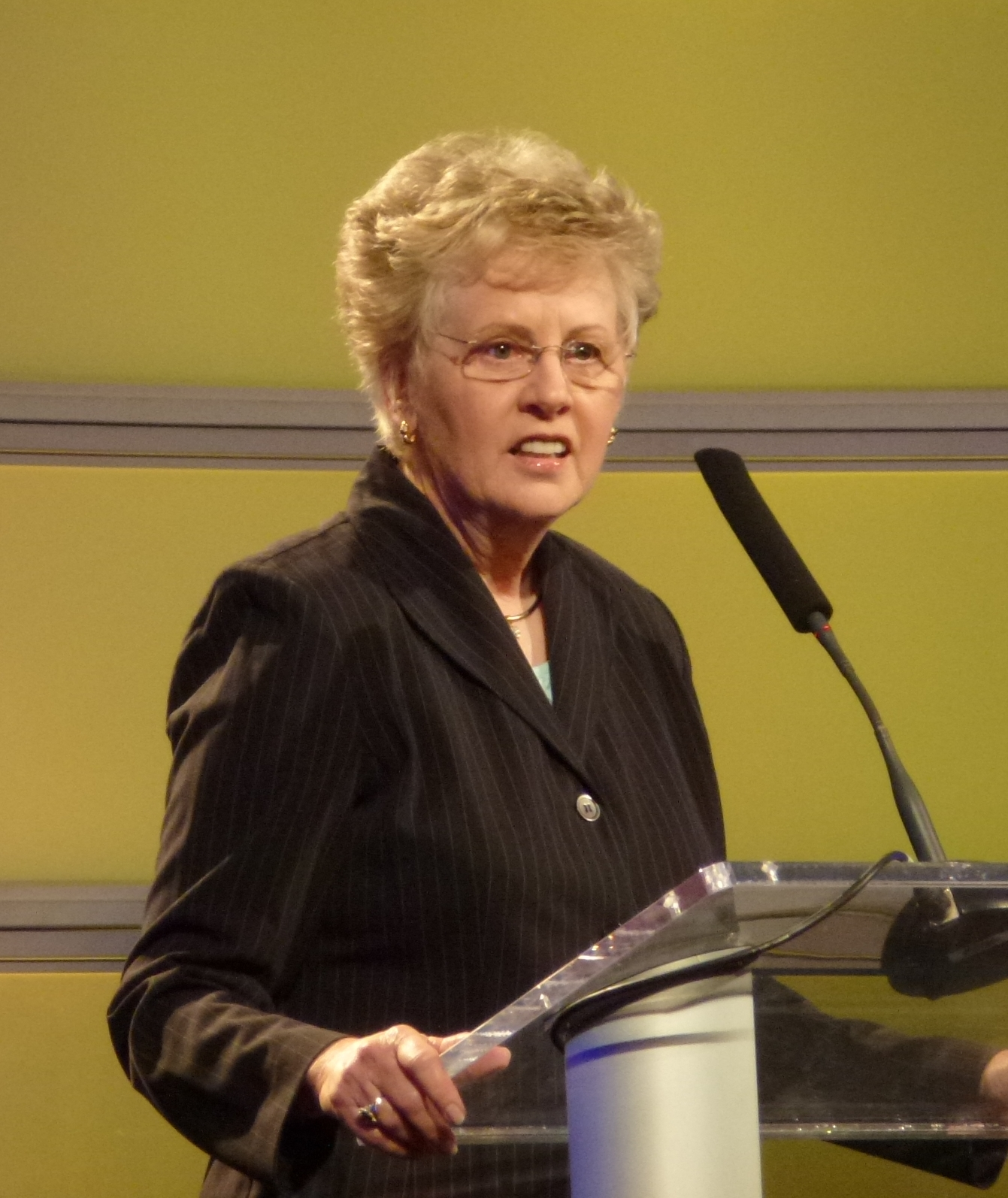
- Kay James at the WBCA Awards ceremony

Biographical details
- Born: June 28, 1947 (age 78); Gulfport, Mississippi, U.S.

Coaching career (HC unless noted)
- 1970: Southern Miss (assistant)
- 1972–1977: Berry
- 1977–1999: Southern Miss
- 2001–2002: Seattle Storm (assistant)

Head coaching record
- Overall: 488–244 (.667)

Diana Kay James (born June 28, 1947) is a color analyst for Southern Miss Lady Eagles basketball games since 2005. Before starting her radio career, James was a high school gym teacher in Ocilla, Georgia during the early 1970s. As a basketball coach for Berry College from 1972 to 1977, her women's team won the 1976 AIAW National Small College Basketball Championship. After her team were consolation game champions at the 1977 AIAW National Small College Basketball Championship, James left Berry that year with 85 wins and 20 losses.

In 1977, James continued her women's basketball coaching career with the University of Southern Mississippi. As an AIAW team in 1981, James and Southern Mississippi reached the quarterfinals at the AIAW Region 3 women's basketball tournament. In the NCAA Division I, Southern Miss competed in the regional semifinals of the 1994 NCAA Division I women's basketball tournament. Following her last season in 1999, James finished her head coaching career at Southern Miss with 403 wins and 224 losses. James received the Carol Eckman Award in 1998 from the Women's Basketball Coaches Association and joined the Mississippi Sports Hall of Fame in 2016.

== Early life and education ==
James was born in Gulfport, Mississippi on June 28, 1947. Growing up, she lived with her three siblings and started playing basketball while in middle school. James played basketball at the 1965 Mississippi championship for Class AA schools with Harrison Central High School. Throughout the remainder of the 1960s, James attended Perkinston Junior College and Mississippi State College for Women for her post-secondary education.

During this time period, James won the doubles tennis title at the Mississippi Junior College Conference tournament in 1967 alongside Nancy Vogle while at Perkinston. The following year, James was part of the team that reached the National Amateur Athletic Union basketball tournament with Mississippi State College. During 1970, James finished her education at the University of Southern Mississippi, while also a member of the women's basketball coaching staff.

== Head coaching career ==
=== Berry College (1972–1977) ===
In 1970, James began working in Ocilla, Georgia as a gym teacher for Irwin County High School. Two years later in 1972, she started her coaching career in volleyball and basketball for Berry College. She held both coaching positions through 1974.

With the women's basketball team, James and Berry won the 1976 AIAW National Small College Basketball Championship. This was the only AIAW championship and first overall for Berry. The following year, they were the consolation game champions at the 1977 AIAW National Small College Basketball Championship. Apart from coaching, James was "an associate professor of physical education and intramural director" that year. Overall, she had 85 wins and 20 losses before she left Berry.

=== Southern Miss (1977–1999) ===
In 1977, James was hired by the University of Southern Mississippi as a gym teacher. For her head coaching career, James joined their tennis and women's basketball teams that year. By the end of the 1970s, James was holding her tennis coaching position for the women at Southern Miss. In 1981, James's team were at the AIAW Region 3 women's basketball tournament and reached the quarterfinals.

That year, Southern Miss joined the NCAA Division I. In 1982, they competed at the National Women's Invitational Tournament. Between 1987 and 1995, James and Southern Miss were four-time winners of the Metro Conference women's basketball tournament. During this time period, James also worked as a sports administrator during 1992 while in her coaching position. Her team reached the regional semifinals at the 1994 NCAA Division I women's basketball tournament. The following year, James turned down an offer to become the women's basketball coach at Mississippi State University.

After the Metro Conference ended in 1995, Southern Miss joined Conference USA in 1996. At the Conference USA women's basketball tournament, James's team were semifinalists in 1996. James remained in her basketball coaching position until 1999 when Southern Mississippi ended her position. With Southern Mississippi, she had 403 wins and 224 losses.

In 2000, James continued working as a physical education teacher at Southern Miss. In 2005, she was a color analyst at WXHB-FM 96.5 for Southern Miss Lady Eagles basketball games. With the Southern Miss Sports Network, James continued her radio position leading up to the early 2020s.

=== Additional positions ===
From 1985 to 1996, James was an assistant coach for the United States women's national basketball team. Her teams won medals at the U.S. Olympic Festival, R. William Jones Cup and World University Games.

In 2001, James became an assistant coach for the Seattle Storm. She remained with the WNBA team until 2002.

== Awards and honors ==
As part of the Metro Conference, James received the Coach of the Year award in 1989. She won this award again in 1992 and 1994. With the Conference USA, James was the Coach of the Year in 1996. From Southern Miss, James became part of the M-Club Hall of Fame in 1994 and the Golden Eagle Legends Club in 2003. The university created Kay James Drive in 2005 and Kay James Day in 2017.

From the Mississippi Gulf Coast Community College, she joined their Athletics Hall of Fame in 2004. James was given the Carol Eckman Award in 1998 and the Jostens-Berenson Lifetime Achievement Award in 2012 by the Women's Basketball Coaches Association. From Hattiesburg, James received their key to the city in 2003. She also joined the Mississippi Sports Hall of Fame in 2016.

== Personal life ==
James continued her basketball experience as a coach for religious youth in Hattiesburg from the early to late 2000s.
