= Denise Curry =

American former basketball player and college and professional basketball coach

Personal information
- Born: August 22, 1959 (age 67) Fort Benton, Montana, U.S.

Career information
- High school: Davis Senior (Davis, California)
- College: UCLA (1977–1981)

Career highlights
- USA Basketball Female Athlete of the Year (1981); 3× Kodak All-American (1979–1981)
- Women's Basketball Hall of Fame
Medals
Women's Basketball
Representing United States
Pan American Games
Silver medal – second place	1979 Puerto Rico	Team competition
Gold medal – first place	1983 Venezuela	Team competition
FIBA World Championship
Gold medal – first place	1979 Seoul	Team competition
Silver medal – second place	1983 Brazil	Team competition
World University Games
Silver medal – second place	1981 Romania	Team competition
Olympic Games
Gold medal – first place	1984 Los Angeles	Team competition
Jones Cup
Gold medal – first place	1979 Taipei	Team competition
Gold medal – first place	1984 Taipei	Team competition

Denise Curry (born August 22, 1959) is an American former basketball player and college and professional basketball coach. Curry was inducted in the inaugural class at the Women's Basketball Hall of Fame in 1999. She was inducted into the Naismith Memorial Basketball Hall of Fame in 1997.

== College basketball ==
Born in Fort Benton, Montana, Curry moved to Davis, California by the time she was in high school. She graduated from Davis Senior High School. During her college playing career she led UCLA to AIAW National Championship in 1978, has been named All-America three times (1979, 1980, 1981), set fourteen school records and was all-time leading scorer (3,198 points) and rebounder (1,310 points). She scored in double figures in every one of the 130 games she played for UCLA. She averaged 24.6 points per game. Only one other Bruin player, Natalie Williams, averaged over 20 points per game at 20.4. As of 2008, she is still the top record holder in 10 categories for UCLA.

She was named MVP of Western Collegiate Athletic Conference three times and UCLA All-University Athlete of the Year in 1981. She was named the USA Basketball Female Athlete of the Year in 1981.

=== UCLA statistics ===
Legend
GP	Games played	GS	Games started	MPG	Minutes per game
FG%	Field goal percentage	3P%	3-point field goal percentage	FT%	Free throw percentage
RPG	Rebounds per game	APG	Assists per game	SPG	Steals per game
BPG	Blocks per game	PPG	Points per game	**Bold**	Career high

Year	Team	GP	Points	FG%	FT%	RPG	APG	SPG	BPG	PPG
1980-81	UCLA	**36**	**930**	60.3%	78.1%	10.0	**3.7**	**1.6**	0.6	25.8
1979-80	UCLA	30	855	60.3%	**89.3%**	**11.2**	2.8	1.4	0.4	**28.5**
1978-79	UCLA	34	803	60.6%	80.9%	10.0	2.8	1.6	**0.7**	23.6
1977-78	UCLA	30	610	**62.1%**	76.9%	9.1	1.4	1.5	0.5	20.3
Career	UCLA	130	3198	60.7%	81.8%	10.1	2.7	1.5	0.6	24.6

?

== Amateur and Olympic competition ==
For the US national team, she won gold medals in the Los Angeles Olympics in 1984, Pan American Games in 1983, World Championships in 1979, and silver medals at World Championships in 1983, World University Games in 1981 and Pan American Games in 1979.

Curry was chosen to represent the USA on the USA Basketball team at the 1981 World University games, held in Bucharest, Romania. After winning the opening game, the USA was challenged by China, who held a halftime lead. The USA came back to win by two points, helped by 26 points from Curry. The USA also was challenged by Canada, who led at halftime, but the USA won by three points 79–76. The USA beat host team Romania to set up a match with undefeated Russia for the gold medal. The Russian team was too strong, and won the gold, leaving the US with the silver medal. Curry averaged 18.3 points per game to lead the team in scoring.

Curry was named to the team representing the US at the 1979 William Jones Cup competition in Taipei, Taiwan. The USA team won all six games en route to the gold medal. She then qualified for the 1980 U.S. Olympic team but was unable to compete due to the 1980 Summer Olympics boycott. In 2007 she received one of 461 Congressional Gold Medals created especially for the spurned athletes.

Curry was a member of the USA National team at the 1983 World Championships, held in Sao Paulo, Brazil. The team won six games, but lost two against the Soviet Union. In an opening round game, the USA team had a nine-point lead at halftime, but the Soviets came back to take the lead, and a final shot by the USA failed to drop, leaving the USSR team with a one-point victory 85–84. The USA team won their next four games, setting up the gold medal game against USSR. This game was also close, and was tied at 82 points each with six seconds to go in the game. The Soviets Elena Chausova received the inbounds pass and hit the game winning shot in the final seconds, giving the USSR team the gold medal with a score of 84–82. The USA team earned the silver medal. Curry averaged 13.6 points per game, including 28 points in the overtime victory against China.

In 1984, the USA sent its National team to the 1984 William Jones Cup competition in Taipei, Taiwan, for pre-Olympic practice. The team easily beat each of the eight teams they played, winning by an average of just under 50 points per game. Curry averaged 9.0 points per game.

== Professional basketball ==
With her professional team, Stade Francais, she won French National championships in 1986 and 1987.

== Coaching ==
Curry served as an assistant coach at the University of California, Berkeley. She was an assistant in the San Jose Lasers of the Women's American Basketball League. She became the head basketball coach at Cal State Fullerton for three seasons from 1997 to 1998 through 1999–2000. She had a coaching record of 16 wins and 64 losses as the head coach of the Titans. She was an assistant basketball coach for the Cal State Long Beach women's basketball team for six years but retired from coaching in March 2009.

== Honors ==
Curry is a member of the Basketball (enshrined in 1997), Women's Basketball (enshrined in 1999), and Amateur Athletic Union Halls of Fame.

She was inducted into the UCLA Athletics Hall of Fame in 1994.

Her #12 basketball jersey was one of the first four retired by UCLA. She was honored on February 3, 1990, in a ceremony in Pauley Pavilion, along with Ann Meyers (#15), Kareem Abdul-Jabbar (#33), and Bill Walton (#32). This was the key moment in the "Pauley at 25" celebration of twenty-five years of the arena. The primary criteria for being chosen was that all four players were three-time All-Americans.

== Bibliography ==
- UCLA Bruins Women's basketball media guide (PDF copy available at www.uclabruins.com)
