= June Olkowski =

American basketball player and coach

Personal information
- Born: November 3, 1960 (age 66)

Career information
- High school: St. Maria Goretti (Philadelphia, Pennsylvania)
- College: Rutgers University

Career highlights
- Kodak All-American (1982)
Medals
Women's basketball
Representing United States
World University Games
| Gold medal – first place | 1979 Mexico City | Team competition |
Jones Cup
| Bronze medal – third place | 1980 Taipei | Team competition |
| Silver medal – second place | 1981 Taipei | Team competition |

June Olkowski (born November 3, 1960) is a former college basketball player and coach, who was head coach of the women's teams at the University of Arizona, Butler University, and Northwestern University.

Olkowski, a 6-foot-0-inch (1.83 m) forward, attended St. Maria Goretti High School in Philadelphia. She played college basketball at Rutgers University, where, as a senior, she was a member of the 1982 team that won the final AIAW women's basketball tournament. She then entered coaching, holding the following positions with women's college basketball teams:

- Assistant coach, University of Maryland, 1982–1985
- Assistant coach, University of Arizona, 1985–1987
- Head coach, University of Arizona, 1987–1991
- Assistant coach, Auburn University, 1991–1993
- Head coach, Butler University, 1993–1999
- Head coach, Northwestern University, 1999–2004

Olkowski was elected to the National Polish-American Sports Hall of Fame in 2012.

== USA Basketball ==
Olkowski was named to the team representing the US at the inaugural William Jones Cup competition in Taipei, Taiwan. In subsequent years, the teams would be primarily college age players, but in the inaugural event, eight of the twelve players, including Olkowski, were in high school. The USA team had a record of 3–4, finishing in fifth place, although one of the wins was over South Korea, who would go on to win the gold medal.

Olkowski was named to the team representing the US at the 1979 World University Games, held in Mexico City, Mexico. The USA team won all seven games to take the gold medal. The USA team played and beat Cuba twice, the team that had defeated them at the Pan Am games. Olkowski averaged 4.3 points per game.

Olkowski was named to the team representing the US at the 1980 William Jones Cup competition in Taipei, Taiwan. The USA team ended with a 7–2 record, which was a three-way tie for first place. The tie-breaker was point differential, and the USA did not win the tie-breaker, so ended up with the bronze medal.

Olkowski was named to represent the US at the 1981 William Jones Cup competition in Taipei, Taiwan. The team won seven of eight games to win the silver medal for the event. Olkowski scored 10.3 points per game and recorded a team high eleven assists, earning a spot on the All-Tournament team.
