= Big West Conference Women's Basketball Coach of the Year =

College basketball award

Big West Coach of the Year
- Awarded for: the top women's basketball coach in the Big West Conference

History
- First award: 1983–84
- First winner: Sheila Strike-Bolla & Jim Bolla, UNLV
- Most wins: 8, Hawaii & UC Santa Barbara
- Most recent: Tamara Inoue, UC Irvine

The Big West Conference Women's Basketball Coach of the Year is an annual college basketball award given to head coaches in the Big West Conference.

The award was first given at the end of the 1983–84 season, when the conference was known as the Pacific Coast Athletic Association (PCAA), to husband and wife co-coaches Sheila Strike and Jim Bolla of UNLV. The programs with the most awards are Hawaii and UC Santa Barbara with 8, with Mark French's conference-leading 7 awards and Laura Beeman garnering the award in 2025. Jennifer Gross is the only head coach to win five consecutive coach of the year honors, her most recent being after the 2020–21 season.

== Winners ==
Season	Coach	School	Source(s)
1983–84	Sheila Strike-Bolla; Jim Bolla	UNLV	
1984–85	Sheila Strike-Bolla (2); Jim Bolla (2)	UNLV (2)	
1985–86	Joan Bonvicini	Long Beach State	
1986–87	Bill Nepfel	Hawaii	
1987–88	Maryalyce Jeremiah	Cal State Fullerton	
1988–89	Vince Goo	Hawaii (2)	
1989–90	Jim Bolla (3)	UNLV (3)	
1990–91	Maryalyce Jeremiah (2)	Cal State Fullerton (2)	
1991–92	Mark French	UC Santa Barbara	
1992–93	Vince Goo (2)	Hawaii (3)	
1993–94	Vince Goo (3)	Hawaii (4)	
1994–95	Colleen Matsuhara	UC Irvine	
1995–96	Mark French (2)	UC Santa Barbara (2)	
1996–97	Mark French (3)	UC Santa Barbara (3)	
1997–98	Mark French (4)	UC Santa Barbara (4)	
1998–99	Tina Slinker	North Texas	
1999–2000	Mark French (5)	UC Santa Barbara (5)	
1999–2000	Faith Mimnaugh	Cal Poly	
2000–01	Mark French (6)	UC Santa Barbara (6)	
2001–02	Jennifer Young	UC Riverside	
2002–03	Mark French (7)	UC Santa Barbara (7)	
2003–04	Mike Divilbiss	Idaho	
2004–05	Tammy Holder	Cal State Northridge	
2005–06	Mary Hegarty	Long Beach State (2)	
2006–07	John Margaritis	UC Riverside (2)	
2007–08	Sandy Simpson	UC Davis	
2008–09	Lindsay Gottlieb	UC Santa Barbara (8)	
2009–10	Sandy Simpson (2)	UC Davis (2)	
2010–11	Faith Mimnaugh (2)	Cal Poly (2)	
2011–12	Jason Flowers	Cal State Northridge (2)	
2012–13	Lynne Roberts	Pacific	
2013–14	Jason Flowers (2)	Cal State Northridge (3)	
2014–15	Laura Beeman	Hawaii (5)	
2015–16	John Margaritis (2)	UC Riverside (3)	
2016–17	Jennifer Gross	UC Davis (3)	
2017–18	Jennifer Gross (2)	UC Davis (4)	
2018–19	Jennifer Gross (3)	UC Davis (5)	
2019–20	Jennifer Gross (4)	UC Davis (6)	
2020–21	Jennifer Gross (5)	UC Davis (7)	
2020–21	Tamara Inoue	UC Irvine (2)	
2021–22	Laura Beeman (2)	Hawaii (6)	
2022–23	Jeff Cammon	Long Beach State (3)	
2023–24	Laura Beeman (3)	Hawaii (7)	
2024–25	Laura Beeman (4)	Hawaii (8)	
2025–26	Tamara Inoue (2)	UC Irvine (3)	

== Winners by school ==
School	Winners	Years
UC Santa Barbara	8	1992, 1996, 1997, 1998, 2000, 2001, 2003, 2009
Hawaii (Note: Hawaii left the Big West Conference in 1996 to join the Western Athletic Conference, and rejoined the Big West in 2012.)	8	1987, 1989, 1993, 1994, 2015, 2022, 2024, 2025
UC Davis	7	2008, 2010, 2017, 2018, 2019, 2020, 2021
Cal State Northridge	3	2005, 2012, 2014
Long Beach State	3	1986, 2006, 2023
UC Irvine	3	1995, 2021, 2026
UC Riverside	3	2002, 2007, 2016
UNLV (Note: UNLV left the Big West Conference for the Mountain West Conference in 1996.)	3	1984, 1985, 1990
Cal State Fullerton	2	1988, 1991
Cal Poly	2	2000, 2011
Idaho (Note: Idaho left the Big West Conference for the Western Athletic Conference in 2005 and is currently a member of the Big Sky Conference.)	1	2005
North Texas (Note: North Texas left the Big West Conference for the Sun Belt Conference in 2000 and is currently a member of the American Athletic Conference.)	1	1999
Pacific (Note: Pacific left the Big West Conference for the West Coast Conference in 2013.)	1	2013

- Among current Big West members, Bakersfield and UC San Diego have yet to have an honored coach.
- Boise State, Fresno State, Nevada, New Mexico State, San Diego State, San Jose State, and Utah State never had an honored coach during their Big West tenures. Another former member, Cal State Los Angeles, left what was then known as the PCAA before the conference sponsored women's sports.
