= Big West Conference women's basketball tournament =

College women's basketball tournament in the United States

- Sport: College basketball
- Conference: Big West Conference
- Number of teams: 8
- Format: Single-elimination tournament
- Current stadium: Lee's Family Forum
- Current location: Henderson, NV
- Played: 1984–present
- Last contest: 2026
- Current champion: UC San Diego
- Most championships: UCSB (14)
- TV partner: ESPN+

The Big West Conference women's basketball tournament is the conference championship tournament in basketball for the Big West Conference. It is a single-elimination tournament and seeding is based on regular season records. The winner, declared conference champion, receives the conference's automatic bid to the NCAA Women's Division I Basketball Championship. The women's tournament has been played every year since 1983.

== Tournament champions ==
Year	Champion	Score	Runner-up	Location
1984	UNLV	90–55	UC Irvine	UNLV (Note: 1984 Tournament was played at location of highest remaining seed.)
1985	UNLV	61–60	UC Irvine	UC Irvine
1986	UNLV	99–89	Long Beach State	First Round at Long Beach State; L.A. Forum (Inglewood, California)
1987	Long Beach State	98–57	UNLV	L.A. Forum (Inglewood, California)
1988	Long Beach State	79–58	UNLV	L.A. Forum (Inglewood, California)
1989	Long Beach State	89–81	UNLV	Opening qualifying game at Long Beach State; Long Beach Arena (Long Beach, California)
1990	UNLV	67–64	Long Beach State	Long Beach Arena (Long Beach, California)
1991	Long Beach State	71–60	Cal State Fullerton	Long Beach Arena (Long Beach, California)
1992	UCSB	68–60	Long Beach State	Long Beach Arena (Long Beach, California)
1993	UCSB	80–77	Hawai'i	Long Beach Arena (Long Beach, California)
1994	UNLV	78–60	Hawai'i	Thomas & Mack Center (Paradise, Nevada)
1995	UC Irvine	65–53	Pacific	Thomas & Mack Center (Paradise, Nevada)
1996	Hawai'i	68–64	Pacific	Lawlor Events Center (Reno, Nevada)
1997	UCSB	81–66	UC Irvine	Lawlor Events Center (Reno, Nevada)
1998	UCSB	86–69	Boise State	Lawlor Events Center (Reno, Nevada)
1999	UCSB	94–67	Long Beach State	Lawlor Events Center (Reno, Nevada)
2000	UCSB	79–69	Long Beach State	Lawlor Events Center (Reno, Nevada)
2001	UCSB	79–76	Long Beach State	Anaheim Convention Center (Anaheim, California)
2002	UCSB	64–53	Pacific	Anaheim Convention Center (Anaheim, California)
2003	UCSB	68–50	Pacific	Anaheim Convention Center (Anaheim, California)
2004	UCSB	68–51	Idaho	Anaheim Convention Center (Anaheim, California)
2005	UCSB	74–66	Idaho	Anaheim Convention Center (Anaheim, California)
2006	UC Riverside	59–58	UCSB	Anaheim Convention Center (Anaheim, California)
2007	UC Riverside	70–67	UCSB	Anaheim Convention Center (Anaheim, California)
2008	UCSB	74–59	UC Davis	Anaheim Convention Center (Anaheim, California)
2009	UCSB	64–57	Cal Poly SLO	Anaheim Convention Center (Anaheim, California)
2010	UC Riverside	71–67	UC Davis	Anaheim Convention Center (Anaheim, California)
2011	UC Davis	66–49	Cal Poly	Opening round at campus sites, semifinals and finals at Honda Center (Anaheim, California)
2012	UCSB	63–54	Long Beach State	Opening round at campus sites, semifinals and finals at Honda Center (Anaheim, California)
2013	Cal Poly	63–49	Pacific	Honda Center (Anaheim, California)
2014	Cal State Northridge	73–58	Cal Poly	Honda Center (Anaheim, California)
2015	Cal State Northridge	67–60	Hawai'i	First two rounds at Titan Gym, semifinals and finals at Honda Center (Anaheim, California)
2016	Hawai'i	78–59	UC Davis	First two rounds at Bren Events Center, semifinals and finals at Honda Center (Anaheim, California)
2017	Long Beach State	56–55	UCSB	First two rounds at Walter Pyramid, semifinals and finals at Honda Center (Anaheim, California)
2018	Cal State Northridge	63–55	UC Davis	First two rounds at Titan Gym, semifinals and finals at Honda Center (Anaheim, California)
2019	UC Davis	58–50	Hawai'i	First two rounds at Bren Events Center, semifinals and finals at Honda Center (Anaheim, California)
2020	Canceled due to the COVID-19 pandemic.			
2021	UC Davis	61–42	UC Irvine	Michelob Ultra Arena (Paradise, Nevada)
2022	Hawai'i	59–48	UC Irvine	Dollar Loan Center (Henderson, Nevada)
2023	Hawai'i	61–59	UCSB	Dollar Loan Center (Henderson, Nevada)
2024	UC Irvine	53–39	UC Davis	Dollar Loan Center (Henderson, Nevada)
2025	UC San Diego	75–66	UC Davis	Lee's Family Forum (Henderson, Nevada)
2026	UC San Diego	60–48	Hawai'i	Lee's Family Forum (Henderson, Nevada)
2027				Lee's Family Forum (Henderson, Nevada)
2028				Lee's Family Forum (Henderson, Nevada)
2029				Lee's Family Forum (Henderson, Nevada)
2030				Lee's Family Forum (Henderson, Nevada)

== Performance by school ==
School	Championships	Championship Years
UC Santa Barbara	14	1992, 1993, 1997, 1998, 1999, 2000, 2001, 2002, 2003, 2004, 2005, 2008, 2009, 2012
UNLV	5	1984, 1985, 1986, 1990, 1994
Long Beach State	5	1987, 1988, 1989, 1991, 2017
Hawai'i	4	1996, 2016, 2022, 2023
Cal State Northridge	3	2014, 2015, 2018
UC Davis	3	2011, 2019, 2021
UC Riverside	3	2006, 2007, 2010
UC Irvine	2	1995, 2024
UC San Diego	2	2025, 2026
Cal Poly	1	2013
Cal State Fullerton	0	
Cal State Bakersfield	0	

- Teams in pink represent former conference members. UC Davis and Hawaii plan to leave in 2026 while UC San Diego and UC Santa Barbara plan to leave in 2027.

== See also ==
- Big West Conference men's basketball tournament
