= 1984 Pacific Coast Athletic Association women's basketball tournament =

- Classification: Division I
- Teams: 3
- Site: Thomas & Mack Center; Las Vegas, Nevada
- Champions: UNLV (1st title)
- Winning coach: Jim Bolla and Sheila Strike (1st title)

1983–84 Pacific Coast Athletic Association women's basketball standings
	Conf.				Overall
Team	W		L	PCT	W		L	PCT
UNLV †	4	–	0	1.000	24	–	7	.774
UC Irvine	2	–	2	.500	20	–	9	.690
UC Santa Barbara	0	–	4	.000	3	–	25	.107
† 1984 PCAA tournament winner Rankings from AP Poll

The 1984 Pacific Coast Athletic Association women's basketball tournament took place March 4–6, 1984. All games were held at the brand new Thomas & Mack Center in Las Vegas, Nevada. UNLV won the inaugural tournament title and received the conference's automatic bid to the 1984 NCAA Women's Division I Basketball Tournament.

== Format ==
All three teams from the regular season standings qualified for the tournament. The top seed received a bye to the final while the number two and number threes seeds started play in the semifinal round.

== Bracket ==
Semifinals; Thursday, March 4			Championship game Saturday, March 6
			1	UNLV	90
			2	UC Irvine	55
3	UC Santa Barbara	64	2	UC Irvine	55
2	UC Irvine	74
