= 1985 Pacific Coast Athletic Association women's basketball tournament =

- Classification: Division I
- Teams: 4
- Site: Crawford Hall; Irvine, California
- Champions: UNLV (2nd title)
- Winning coach: Jim Bolla and Sheila Strike (2nd title)

1984–85 Pacific Coast Athletic Association women's basketball standings
	Conf.				Overall
Team	W		L	PCT	W		L	PCT
UNLV †	8	–	0	1.000	26	–	5	.839
UC Irvine	6	–	2	.750	21	–	7	.750
UC Santa Barbara	3	–	5	.375	12	–	16	.429
Hawaii	2	–	6	.250	20	–	12	.625
Pacific	1	–	7	.125	7	–	20	.259
† 1985 PCAA tournament winner Rankings from AP Poll

The 1985 Pacific Coast Athletic Association women's basketball tournament took place March 9–11, 1985. All games were held at Crawford Hall in Irvine, California. UNLV won the tournament title for the second straight time and received the conference's automatic bid to the 1985 NCAA Women's Division I Basketball Tournament.

== Format ==
The top four teams, out of five, from the regular season standings qualified for the tournament.

All participating teams started play in the semifinal round. The top seed was matched with the four seed while the two seed was matched with the three seed.

== Bracket ==
Semifinals; Thursday, March 9
1	UNLV	68
4	Hawaii	49
3	UC Santa Barbara	41
2	UC Irvine	64

Championship game Saturday, March 11
1	UNLV	61
2	UC Irvine	60
