= 1986 Pacific Coast Athletic Association women's basketball tournament =

- Classification: Division I
- Teams: 8
- Site: The Forum; Inglewood, California
- Quarterfinals site: Long Beach Arena; Long Beach, California
- Champions: UNLV (3rd title)
- Winning coach: Jim Bolla and Sheila Strike (3rd title)
- MVP: Misty Thomas (UNLV)

1985–86 Pacific Coast Athletic Association women's basketball standings
	Conf.				Overall
Team	W		L	PCT	W		L	PCT
Long Beach State	14	–	0	1.000	29	–	5	.853
UNLV †	11	–	3	.786	22	–	9	.710
Cal State Fullerton	8	–	6	.571	11	–	18	.379
UC Irvine	6	–	8	.429	14	–	14	.500
San Diego State	6	–	8	.429	14	–	17	.452
Hawaii	5	–	9	.357	12	–	16	.429
Pacific	5	–	9	.357	11	–	17	.393
UC Santa Barbara	1	–	13	.071	6	–	22	.214
† 1986 PCAA tournament winner Rankings from AP Poll

The 1986 Pacific Coast Athletic Association women's basketball tournament took place March 6–8, 1986. The quarterfinal round was played at Long Beach Arena in Long Beach, California, while the semifinals and championship were held at The Forum in Inglewood, California. UNLV won the tournament title for the third straight time and received the conference's automatic bid to the 1986 NCAA Women's Division I Basketball Tournament.

== Format ==
The top eight teams, out of ten, from the regular season standings qualified for the tournament.

All eight participating teams were placed into the first round, with teams seeded and paired based on regular-season records. After the first round, teams were re-seeded so the highest-remaining team was paired with the lowest-remaining time in one semifinal with the other two teams slotted into the other semifinal.

== Bracket ==
Quarterfinals; Wednesday, March 6
1	Long Beach State	94
8	UC Santa Barbara	63
4	UC Irvine	56
5	San Diego State	73
3	Cal State Fullerton	78
6	Hawaii	69
2	UNLV	77
7	Pacific	70

Semifinals (Re-Seeded); Friday, March 7
1	Long Beach State	116
5	San Diego State	74
3	Cal State Fullerton	75
2	UNLV	80

Championship game Saturday, March 8
1	Long Beach State	89
2	UNLV	99

== All-Tournament Team ==
- Cindy Brown, Long Beach State
- Dee Dee Duncan, San Diego State
- Robin Holmes, Cal State Fullerton
- Donya Moore, UNLV
- Misty Thomas, UNLV (MVP)
