= 1990 Big West Conference women's basketball tournament =

- Classification: Division I
- Teams: 10
- Site: Long Beach Arena; Long Beach, California
- Champions: UNLV (4th title)
- Winning coach: Joan Bonvicini (4th title)
- MVP: Geannine Jordan (UNLV)

1988–89 Big West Conference women's basketball standings
	Conf.				Overall
Team	W		L	PCT	W		L	PCT
UNLV †	17	–	1	.944	28	–	3	.903
Hawaii	16	–	2	.889	26	–	4	.867
Long Beach State	14	–	4	.778	25	–	9	.735
Fresno State	11	–	7	.611	21	–	12	.636
Cal State Fullerton	9	–	9	.500	14	–	14	.500
UC Santa Barbara	8	–	10	.444	13	–	15	.464
Pacific	7	–	11	.389	15	–	15	.500
San Diego State	6	–	12	.333	7	–	23	.233
San Jose State	2	–	16	.111	5	–	24	.172
UC Irvine	0	–	18	.000	1	–	27	.036
† 1990 Big West tournament winner Rankings from AP Poll

The 1990 Big West Conference women's basketball tournament took place March 7–10, 1990. All games were held at the Long Beach Arena in Long Beach, California. UNLV won their fourth tournament title and received the conference's automatic bid to the 1990 NCAA Women's Division I Basketball Tournament.

== Format ==
All ten teams from the regular season standings qualified for the tournament.

The opening round featured two games, matching the eight versus nine seeds and the seven versus ten seeds. The remaining top seven teams were placed into the quarterfinal round, with teams seeded and paired based on regular-season records.

== Bracket ==
First round Wednesday, March 7
8	San Diego State	59
9	San Jose State	81
7	Pacific	71
10	UC Irvine	51

Quarterfinals; Thursday, March 8
1	UNLV	102
9	San Jose State	67
4	Fresno State	72
5	Cal State Fullerton	60
3	Long Beach State	89
6	UC Santa Barbara	59
2	Hawaii	63
7	Pacific	68

Semifinals; Friday, March 9
1	UNLV	91
4	Fresno State	71
3	Long Beach State	85
7	Pacific	83

Championship game Saturday, March 10
1	UNLV	67
3	Long Beach State	64

== All-Tournament Team ==
- Tine Freil, Pacific
- Geannine Jordan, UNLV (MVP)
- Pauline Jordan, UNLV
- Angie Lee, Long Beach State
- Penny Moore, Long Beach State
- Julie Szukalski, Pacific
