= 1980–81 AIAW Division I women's basketball rankings =

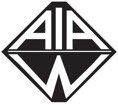
- Season: 1980–81
- AIAW Tournament: 1981
- Preseason No. 1: Louisiana Tech
- AIAW Tournament Champions: Louisiana Tech
AIAW Division I women's basketball rankings
| ← 1979–80 |

A single human poll represents the 1980–81 AIAW Division I women's basketball rankings, the AP Poll, in addition to various publications' preseason polls. The AP poll was initially a poll of coaches conducted via telephone, where coaches identified top teams and a list of the Top 20 team was produced. The contributors continued to be coaches until 1994, when the AP took over administration of the poll from Mel Greenberg, and switched to a panel of writers. The AP poll is currently a poll of sportswriters. The AP conducts polls weekly through the end of the regular season and conference play.

== Legend ==
| – | Not ranked |
| (#) | Ranking |

== AP Poll ==
| Team | 25-Nov | 2-Dec | 9-Dec | 16-Dec | 23-Dec | 30-Dec | 5-Jan | 13-Jan | 20-Jan | 27-Jan | 3-Feb | 10-Feb | 17-Feb | 24-Feb | 3-Mar | 8-Mar | 15-Mar | 26-Mar |
|---|---|---|---|---|---|---|---|---|---|---|---|---|---|---|---|---|---|---|
| Louisiana Tech | 1 | 1 | 1 | 1 | 1 | 1 | 1 | 1 | 1 | 1 | 1 | 1 | 1 | 1 | 1 | 1 | 1 | 1 |
| Tennessee | 3 | 3 | 3 | 6 | 7 | 7 | 9 | 7 | 7 | 10 | 11 | 7 | 7 | 4 | 3 | 3 | 2 | 2 |
| Old Dominion | 2 | 2 | 2 | 2 | 2 | 2 | 2 | 2 | 2 | 3 | 2 | 2 | 3 | 6 | 6 | 6 | 3 | 3 |
| Southern California | 12 | 13 | 12 | 12 | 12 | 12 | 12 | 12 | 10 | 8 | 7 | 8 | 8 | 8 | 9 | 9 | 4 | 4 |
| Cheyney | 10 | 9 | 9 | 9 | 9 | 11 | 11 | 9 | 8 | 9 | 8 | 9 | 10 | 7 | 7 | 8 | 5 | 5 |
| Long Beach St. | 6 | 5 | 5 | 4 | 4 | 4 | 4 | 4 | 4 | 6 | 6 | 5 | 4 | 2 | 2 | 2 | 7 | 6 |
| UCLA | 16 | 12 | 10 | 10 | 8 | 8 | 5 | 6 | 6 | 4 | 5 | 6 | 5 | 9 | 8 | 7 | 10 | 7 |
| Maryland | 14 | 16 | 16 | 18 | 17 | 17 | 17 | 14 | 14 | 11 | 9 | 12 | 11 | 13 | 13 | 13 | 9 | 8 |
| Rutgers | 4 | 4 | 4 | 3 | 3 | 3 | 3 | 3 | 3 | 2 | 4 | 4 | 2 | 5 | 5 | 5 | 8 | 9 |
| Kansas | 9 | 7 | 7 | 5 | 5 | 5 | 6 | 5 | 5 | 5 | 3 | 3 | 6 | 3 | 4 | 4 | 6 | 10 |
| Kentucky | 17 | 17 | 14 | 15 | 14 | 14 | 14 | 11 | 9 | 7 | 10 | 10 | 9 | 10 | 10 | 10 | 11 | 11 |
| Oregon | 13 | 11 | 15 | 17 | 15 | 15 | 15 | 20 | 18 | 16 | 17 | 14 | 14 | 12 | 12 | 12 | 14 | 12 |
| North Carolina St. | 11 | 10 | 11 | 11 | 10 | 9 | 7 | 10 | 12 | 13 | 15 | 13 | 15 | 17 | 16 | 14 | 13 | 13 |
| Stephen F. Austin | 7 | 15 | 17 | 14 | 13 | 13 | 13 | 16 | 17 | 12 | 12 | 17 | 19 | T20 | 19 | 19 | 16 | 14 |
| Illinois St. | – | – | – | – | – | – | – | 19 | 20 | – | – | – | – | – | – | – | – | 15 |
| Texas | 8 | 8 | 8 | 7 | 6 | 6 | 8 | 8 | 11 | 14 | 14 | 11 | 13 | 11 | 11 | 11 | 12 | 16 |
| Jackson St. | – | – | – | – | – | – | T20 | 17 | 19 | – | – | – | – | – | – | – | – | 17 |
| Minnesota | – | – | – | – | – | – | – | – | – | 18 | 19 | 18 | 18 | 15 | 15 | 15 | 15 | 18 |
| Oregon St. | – | – | – | – | – | – | – | – | – | – | – | – | – | – | – | – | 18 | 19 |
| Clemson | 19 | 19 | 19 | 16 | 19 | 18 | – | – | – | 20 | – | 19 | 16 | 19 | – | 16 | 20 | 20 |
| Auburn | – | – | – | – | – | – | – | – | – | – | 20 | T20 | 20 | T20 | 18 | 17 | – | – |
| Colorado | – | – | – | 20 | 20 | 19 | 18 | – | – | – | – | – | – | – | – | 18 | 17 | – |
| East Carolina | – | – | – | – | – | – | – | – | – | 19 | 18 | – | – | 18 | 17 | 20 | – | – |
| Georgia St. | – | – | – | – | – | – | – | – | – | – | – | – | – | – | – | – | 19 | – |
| Kansas St. | 15 | 14 | 13 | 13 | 16 | 16 | 16 | 15 | 16 | – | – | – | – | – | – | – | – | – |
| Mercer | 18 | 18 | 18 | – | – | – | – | – | – | – | – | – | – | – | – | – | – | – |
| Penn St. | 20 | – | – | 19 | 18 | – | – | – | – | – | – | – | – | – | – | – | – | – |
| San Diego St. | – | – | – | – | – | – | – | – | – | – | – | T20 | – | – | – | – | – | – |
| San Francisco | – | – | – | – | – | 20 | 19 | – | – | – | – | – | – | – | – | – | – | – |
| South Carolina | 5 | 6 | 6 | 8 | 11 | 10 | 10 | 13 | 13 | 15 | 13 | 15 | 12 | 14 | 14 | – | – | – |
| Virginia | – | – | – | – | – | – | T20 | 18 | 15 | 17 | 16 | 16 | 17 | 16 | 20 | – | – | – |
| Wayland Baptist | – | 20 | 20 | – | – | – | – | – | – | – | – | – | – | – | – | – | – | – |
