= Mimnaugh =

Mimnaugh is a surname. Notable people with the surname include:

- Faith Mimnaugh (born 1963), American basketball coach
- Reegan Mimnaugh (born 2001), Scottish footballer
