= Jamie Craighead =

American college basketball coach

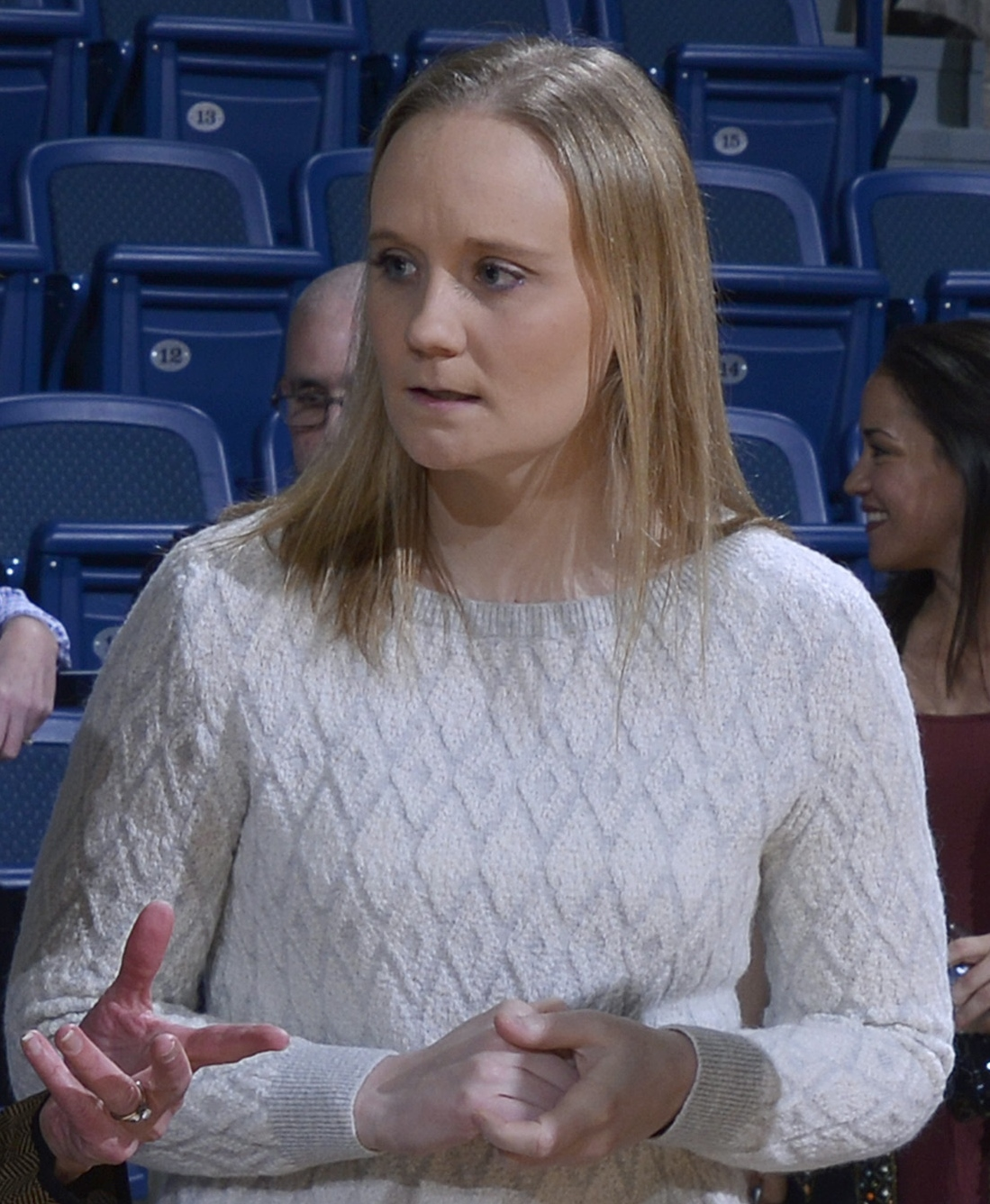
- Craighead at Clune Arena in 2017

Current position
- Title: Associate head coach and general manager
- Team: San Francisco
- Conference: WCC

Biographical details
- Born: May 23, 1980 (age 46); McCleary, Washington, U.S.

Playing career
- 1998–2002: Oregon
- Position: Point guard

Coaching career (HC unless noted)
- 2002–2005: Seattle Pacific (asst.)
- 2005–2007: Portland State (asst.)
- 2007–2008: Sacramento State (asst.)
- 2008–2009: Sacramento State (assoc. HC)
- 2009–2013: Sacramento State
- 2013–2022: San Jose State
- 2024–present: San Francisco (assoc. HC)

Head coaching record
- Overall: 140–230 (.378)

Accomplishments and honors

Championships
- As player: WNIT (2002)

Jamie Lynn Craighead Turner (née Craighead; born May 23, 1980) is an American women's college basketball coach who is currently associate head coach at San Francisco. A basketball coach since 2002, Craighead was previously an assistant and head coach at Sacramento State, then head coach at San Jose State from 2013 to 2022.

Craighead grew up in Elma, Washington and played college basketball at the University of Oregon, where she was part of the 2002 Women's National Invitation Tournament championship team as a senior. Her first coaching job was as an assistant coach at Seattle Pacific from 2002 to 2005; she helped Seattle Pacific finish as national runners-up in the 2005 NCAA Division II women's basketball tournament. Craighead was later assistant coach at Portland State from 2005 to 2007 and Sacramento State from 2007 to 2009. In 2009, Craighead got her first head coaching job at Sacramento State. Craighead's debut season had 15 wins, as many wins as the previous two seasons combined. Craighead led the 2012–13 Sacramento State team to the first winning season in 19 years.

Just two months before the season was to begin, Craighead was hired as San Jose State head coach in 2013. Her second season had San Jose State advance to the 2015 Mountain West tournament semifinals after an upset of no. 1 seed Colorado State. The 2015–16 team improved from eighth to fourth place in the Mountain West Conference standings and resulted in a contract extension for Craighead. After three straight losing seasons, San Jose State had 19 wins in 2019–20, the most successful season in 15 years. Although San Jose State entered 2020–21 picked by fellow conference coaches to finish second in the standings, the team ended its season after only four games due to repeated COVID-19 issues. Following a last place finish in conference standings, Craighead was fired in 2022.

== Early life and college playing career ==
Born in McCleary, Washington, Craighead grew up in nearby Elma. A 1998 graduate of Elma High School, Craighead earned four first-team all-league honors in basketball and was Washington 2A Player of the Year as a senior.

Craighead then attended the University of Oregon from 1998 to 2002. As a freshman, she played 12 games as a reserve, in a season where Oregon finished first in the Pac-10 and made the 1999 NCAA tournament. In her sophomore season (1999–2000), Craighead moved up on the depth chart, as she became the team's second-leading three-point shooter and played in Oregon's 2000 NCAA tournament first-round game, an overtime loss to UAB. Oregon again won the Pac-10 in 2000.

In the 2000–01 season, Craighead started 28 games and averaged 11.4 points and 2.7 rebounds, in her third straight season on an Oregon team that made an NCAA tournament.

As a senior in 2001–02 under new coach Bev Smith, Craighead started 35 of 35 games and averaged 7.9 points and 2.4 rebounds, helping Oregon win the 2002 Women's National Invitation Tournament. In the WNIT title game, Craighead made a three-pointer with 1:20 left to put Oregon ahead of Houston, 51-50. Oregon would win 54-52. Craighead graduated from Oregon with a B.A. in educational studies.

=== Oregon statistics ===
Legend
GP	Games played	GS	Games started	MPG	Minutes per game
FG%	Field goal percentage	3P%	3-point field goal percentage	FT%	Free throw percentage
RPG	Rebounds per game	APG	Assists per game	SPG	Steals per game
BPG	Blocks per game	PPG	Points per game	**Bold**	Career high

Year	Team	GP	Points	FG%	3P%	FT%	RPG	APG	SPG	BPG	PPG
1998-99	Oregon	12	15	37.5%	25.0%	33.3%	0.5	0.7	0.6	0.1	1.3
1999-00	Oregon	31	145	33.5%	30.6%	50.0%	1.8	2.2	0.7	0.2	4.7
2000-01	Oregon	29	**331**	37.6%	38.0%	64.7%	**2.7**	**3.1**	**1.2**	**0.3**	**11.4**
2001-02	Oregon	**35**	277	**40.3%**	**39.9%**	**81.8%**	2.4	2.6	0.5	0.1	7.9
Career		107	768	37.6%	37.0%	66.7%	2.1	2.4	0.8	0.2	7.2

== Coaching career ==
=== Early coaching career (2000–2009) ===
Craighead became an assistant coach at Division II Seattle Pacific University in 2002 under Gordy Presnell. By Craighead's third season on staff, Seattle Pacific made the championship round of the 2005 NCAA tournament.

Moving up to the Division I level, Craighead was an assistant at Portland State from 2005 to 2007 under Charity Elliott.

After two seasons at Portland State, Craighead joined Dan Muscatell's staff at Sacramento State in 2007. Craighead was promoted to associate head coach for the 2008–09 season. Sacramento State won just 15 games in these two seasons.

=== Sacramento State (2009–2013) ===
Sacramento State promoted Craighead to head coach in 2009 after Muscatell resigned to become an assistant coach at Oregon. In her first season as head coach, Craighead led the Hornets to a 15–15 record with a 10–6 record in Big Sky Conference games, good enough for a three-way tie for second place. The season had as many wins as the past two seasons combined and was the first season with 10 or more wins since 1995–96. However, the program struggled in the next two seasons with a 4–25 record in 2010–11 and 13–18 in 2011–12.

In Craighead's final season in 2012–13, Sacramento State went 19–12 (13–7 Big Sky), with both total and conference win totals reaching or meeting historic highs. That season was Sacramento State's first winning season since 1993–94.

=== San Jose State (2013–2022) ===
Following the surprise resignation of women's basketball head coach Tim LaKose, San Jose State hired Craighead on September 16, 2013 to replace La Kose. In her second season, Craighead led the #8 seed Spartans to the semifinals of the Mountain West tournament after an upset of #1 seed Colorado State, in a 15–17 season that also saw San Jose State break school and conference records by scoring 119 points against Columbia.

Craighead's third season with San Jose State in 2015–16 ended with a 13–17 record, including an 11–7 Mountain West record and fourth-place finish, the highest Mountain West win total and conference standing in Craighead's tenure. On June 30, 2016, San Jose State extended Craighead's contract through the 2020–21 season. In the next three seasons, San Jose State went 11–21 in 2016–17, 7–23 in 2017–18, and 6–24 in 2018–19.

In the 2019–20 season, Craighead had her most successful season at San Jose State with a 19–12 record (12–6 MW) and tie for third place in the MW standings. This was San Jose State's best win–loss record in 15 years. In April 2020, Craighead signed a new contract through the 2022–23 season.

Heading into the 2020–21 season, San Jose State was picked second in the Mountain West preseason coaches' poll. However, San Jose State played only four games, with a 2–2 (1–2 MW) record, before canceling the season in January due to repeated COVID-19 issues.

In 2021–22, San Jose State had its worst season under Craighead with a 5–25 (2–16 MW) record and last place finish in conference standings. On March 11, 2022, San Jose State fired Craighead with one year remaining on her contract.

=== San Francisco associate head coach (2024–present) ===
In August 2024, Craighead returned to college basketball as associate head coach at the University of San Francisco under head coach Molly Goodenbour. With Craighead on staff, San Francisco finished 15–16 in 2024–25 and 19–15 in 2025–26.

== Personal life ==
Craighead is married to Melanie Turner, a former University of San Francisco women's basketball player. They have one child.

== Head coaching record ==
Record table
Season	Team	Overall	Conference	Standing	Postseason
Sacramento State Hornets (Big Sky Conference) (2009–2013)
2009–10	Sacramento State	15–15	10–6	T–2nd	
2010–11	Sacramento State	4–25	1–15	9th	
2011–12	Sacramento State	13–18	7–9	T–6th	
2012–13	Sacramento State	19–12	13–7	4th	
Sacramento State:		51–70 (.421)	31–37 (.456)		
San Jose State Spartans (Mountain West Conference) (2013–present)
2013–14	San Jose State	11–19	5–13	10th	
2014–15	San Jose State	15–17	7–11	8th	
2015–16	San Jose State	13–17	11–7	4th	
2016–17	San Jose State	11–21	7–11	8th	
2017–18	San Jose State	7–23	4–14	11th	
2018–19	San Jose State	6–24	5–13	9th	
2019–20	San Jose State	19–12	12–6	T–3rd	
2020–21	San Jose State	2–2	1–2	(opted out)	
2021–22	San Jose State	5–25	2–16	11th	
San Jose State:		89–160 (.357)	54–93 (.367)		
Total:		140–230 (.378)			
