= Dan Muscatell =

American college basketball coach (born 1960)

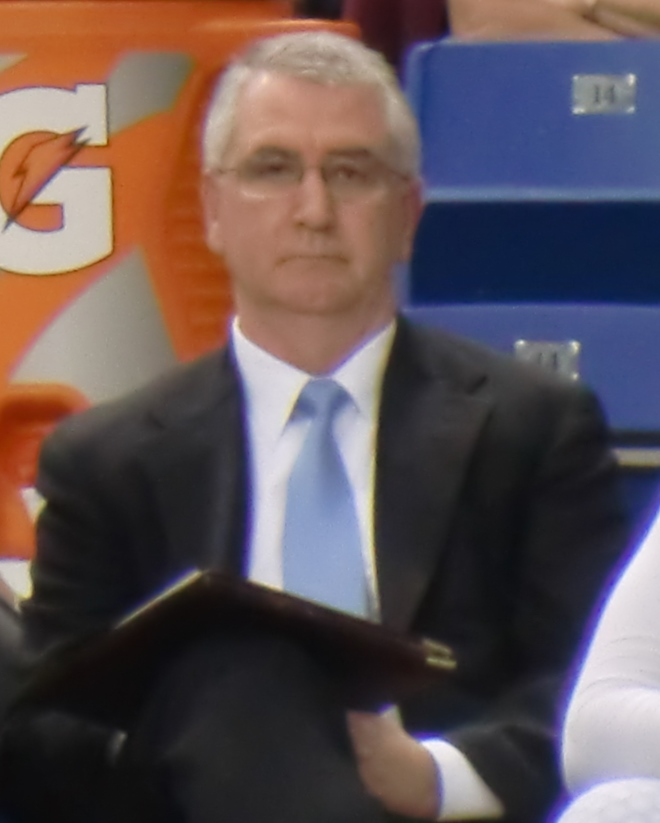
- Muscatell in 2016

Biographical details
- Born: May 24, 1960 (age 66); Everett, Washington, U.S.

Playing career
- 1978–1980: Green River CC
- 1980–1982: Western Washington
- Position: Guard

Coaching career (HC unless noted)
- 1982–1990: Meridian HS (boys')
- 1994–1999: Rochester HS (boys')
- 1999–2003: Oregon (asst.)
- 2003–2009: Sacramento State
- 2009–2014: Oregon (asst.)
- 2014–2018: San Jose State (asst.)

Administrative career (AD unless noted)
- 2018–2019: San Jose State (special asst.)

Head coaching record
- Overall: 36–133 (.213) (college)

Accomplishments and honors

Championships
- As assistant coach: Pac-10 regular season (2000); WNIT (2002)

Daniel Ray Muscatell (born May 24, 1960) is an American college basketball coach who was most recently women's basketball assistant coach at San Jose State.

== Early life and education ==
Born in Everett, Washington, Muscatell graduated from Cascade High School in 1978. He began his college basketball career at Green River Community College before transferring to Western Washington University in 1980. For two years, Muscatell played at guard for the Western Washington Vikings. In both his seasons at Western Washington, Muscatell led the team in assists. Muscatell completed his bachelor's degree in physical education and psychology in 1983 and went on to earn a master's degree in public administration in 1990 also from Western Washington.

== Coaching career ==
From 1982 to 1990, Muscatell was boys' varsity basketball coach at Meridian HS in Laurel, Washington. In his first season, the team qualified for the postseason, after winning just three games in the two prior seasons. Muscatell earned county and regional "Coach of the Year" honors after leading Meridian to a school-record second-place district finish. At Meridian, Muscatell also taught physical education, math, psychology, and leadership between 1985 and 1990 and was also an assistant principal from 1986 to 1990.

Muscatell later became a teacher at Rochester High School in Rochester, Washington. From 1994 to 1999, Muscatell was also boys' varsity basketball head coach. His teams made the postseason in all five of his seasons, and Muscatell earned conference Coach of the Year honors in 1996 and 1998 and regional honors in 1999.

In 1999, Muscatell moved up to the collegiate level as a women's basketball assistant coach at Oregon. He served under Jody Runge from 1999 to 2001 and Bev Smith from 2001 to 2003. Muscatell helped Oregon win the Pac-10 regular season title in 2000 and 2002 WNIT. Oregon finished the 1999–00 and 2000–01 seasons with top-ten rankings and NCAA tournament appearances.

From 2003 to 2009, Muscatell was head coach at Sacramento State. He inherited a program that won just six games in the past three seasons. Muscatell ended his six-season tenure with a 36–133 overall record but had 21 wins in Big Sky Conference play, the most for any coach in program history.

Muscatell returned to Oregon in 2009 for his second tenure as assistant coach, this time under Paul Westhead. During Muscatell's second tenure, Oregon made the 2010 WNIT.

In 2014, Muscatell came to San Jose State to be an assistant coach under Jamie Craighead, who Muscatell coached from 1999 to 2002. Muscatell helped San Jose State upset #1 seed Colorado State in the Mountain West tournament and advance to the semifinal round. In 2015–16, San Jose State finished with an 11–7 record in Mountain West play for its best conference record in nearly a decade. After the 2017–18 season, Craighead reassigned Muscatell to a special assistant position where he oversaw budgeting, scheduling, travel, and other business operations. Muscatell retired from San Jose State after the 2018–19 season.

== Head coaching record ==
Record table
Season	Team	Overall	Conference	Standing	Postseason
Sacramento State Hornets (Big Sky Conference) (2003–2009)
2003–04	Sacramento State	1–26	1–13	8th	
2004–05	Sacramento State	8–20	4–10	6th	
2005–06	Sacramento State	9–17	4–10	7th	
2006–07	Sacramento State	3–27	1–15	9th	
2007–08	Sacramento State	6–22	4–12	8th	
2008–09	Sacramento State	9–21	7–9	T–4th	
Sacramento State:		36–133 (.213)	21–69 (.233)		
Total:		36–133 (.213)			
