= Jennifer Gross (basketball) =

American basketball coach

Current position
- Title: Head coach
- Team: UC Davis
- Conference: Mountain West
- Record: 281–177 (.614)

Playing career
- 1993–1997: UC Davis

Coaching career (HC unless noted)
- 1998–2000: University City HS (CA) (assistant)
- 2000–2002: University City HS
- 2002–2004: San Diego State (assistant)
- 2004–2008: UC Davis (assistant)
- 2008–2011: UC Davis (associate HC)
- 2011–present: UC Davis

Head coaching record
- Overall: 281–177 (.614) (college)
- Tournaments: 0–2 (NCAA); 5–4 (WNIT)

Accomplishments and honors

Championships
- 5 Big West regular season (2017–2021); 2 Big West tournament (2019, 2021)

Awards
- 5× Big West Coach of the Year (2017–2021); 1× Finalist for Women's Naismith College Coach of the Year (2018)

Jennifer Gross (born 1976) is an American basketball coach who is currently the head women's basketball coach at UC Davis.

== Playing career ==
Gross was a four-year player at UC Davis from 1993 to 1997, where she set school records for career assists, steals, and three-pointers made. She had a brief professional career playing overseas in Denmark and Israel before turning towards coaching.

== Coaching career ==
Gross started as an assistant at her alma mater University City High School in San Diego, also spending time as a head coach there before joining the San Diego State staff as an assistant.

=== UC Davis ===
Gross joined her alma mater in 2004 as an assistant coach, and was promoted to associate head coach before the 2008–09 season. She was named the successor to head coach Sandy Simpson before the 2010–11 season after he announced his retirement.

Gross signed an extension to remain at UC Davis in 2021. The five-year deal also has automatic renewal extensions for the next five years after that, making it the longest contract extension given to a head coach in UC Davis athletic department history.

== Head coaching record ==
- UC Davis
- Big West

Record table
Season	Team	Overall	Conference	Standing	Postseason
UC Davis Aggies (Big West Conference) (2011–2026)
2011–12	UC Davis	17–13	9–7	4th	WNIT First Round
2012–13	UC Davis	12–18	7–11	7th	
2013–14	UC Davis	15–16	9–7	T–4th	
2014–15	UC Davis	15–16	8–8	T–5th	
2015–16	UC Davis	19–13	10–6	4th	
2016–17	UC Davis	25–8	14–2	1st	WNIT Third Round
2017–18	UC Davis	28–7	14–2	1st	WNIT Quarterfinal
2018–19	UC Davis	25–7	15–1	1st	NCAA Division I Round of 64
2019–20	UC Davis	17–12	12–4	1st	Postseason not held due to COVID-19
2020–21	UC Davis	13–3	9–1	1st	NCAA Division I Round of 64
2021–22	UC Davis	15–13	8–8	6th	
2022–23	UC Davis	16–14	12–7	4th	
2023–24	UC Davis	20–14	13–7	T-3rd	
2024–25	UC Davis	21–12	13–7	T-3rd	
2025–26	UC Davis	23–11	13–7	3rd	WNIT First Round
UC Davis Aggies (Mountain West Conference) (2026–present)
2026–27	UC Davis	0–0	0–0		
UC Davis:		281–177 (.614)	140–71 (.664)		
Total:		281–177 (.614)			
National champion Postseason invitational champion Conference regular season champion Conference regular season and conference tournament champion Division regular season champion Division regular season and conference tournament champion Conference tournament champion
