= Jason Flowers (basketball) =

American basketball coach

Current position
- Title: Head Men’s Basketball Coach
- Team: Los Angeles City College
- Conference: SCC

Biographical details
- Born: August 10, 1979 (age 47); Inglewood, California
- Education: UCLA (2001)

Playing career
- 1997–1999: UC Irvine
- 1999–2001: UCLA
- Position: Guard

Coaching career (HC unless noted)

Men's basketball
- 2001–2003: UCLA (volunteer asst.)

Women's basketball
- 2003–2004: Santa Ana Valley HS (CA)
- 2004–2008: Long Beach State (asst.)
- 2008–2010: UC Riverside (asst.)
- 2010–2020: Cal State Northridge

Administrative career (AD unless noted)
- 2020–2022: California Baptist (director of player development)

Head coaching record
- Overall: 150–169 (.470) (college)
- Tournaments: 0–3 (NCAA); 0–1 (WNIT)

Accomplishments and honors

Championships
- Big West regular season (2014); 3 Big West tournament (2014, 2015, 2018)

Awards
- 2× Big West Coach of the Year (2012, 2014)

Jason Flowers (born August 10, 1979) is an American basketball coach who is currently the men's basketball head coach at Los Angeles City College (LACC). Prior to LACC, Flowers was the director of player development for the women's basketball team at California Baptist University. Prior to Cal Baptist, he was the head women's basketball coach at Cal State Northridge from 2010 to 2020, where he was a two-time Big West Conference Coach of the Year as well as winning three Big West Conference tournament titles.

== Personal life ==
A former guard at UC Irvine and UCLA, Flowers is married to Tairia Flowers (née Mims), a former Olympic gold medalist in softball who is currently the head softball coach at Loyola Marymount. They have three children, two daughters and a son.

== Head coaching record ==
Record table
Season	Team	Overall	Conference	Standing	Postseason
Cal State Northridge Matadors (Big West Conference) (2010–2020)
2010–11	Cal State Northridge	4–26	4–12	9th	
2011–12	Cal State Northridge	17–14	11–5	2nd	WNIT First Round
2012–13	Cal State Northridge	16–16	9–9	T–5th	
2013–14	Cal State Northridge	18–15	12–4	1st	NCAA Division I Round of 64
2014–15	Cal State Northridge	23–10	11–5	2nd	NCAA Division I Round of 64
2015–16	Cal State Northridge	7–24	5–11	7th	
2016–17	Cal State Northridge	18–14	10–6	3rd	
2017–18	Cal State Northridge	19–16	8–8	5th	NCAA Division I Round of 64
2018–19	Cal State Northridge	16–15	10–6	T–2nd	
2019–20	Cal State Northridge	12–19	7–9	7th	
Cal State Northridge:		150–169 (.470)	87–75 (.537)		
Total:		150–169 (.470)			
National champion Postseason invitational champion Conference regular season champion Conference regular season and conference tournament champion Division regular season champion Division regular season and conference tournament champion Conference tournament champion
