= Faith Mimnaugh =

American collegiate basketball coach

Biographical details
- Born: 1963 (age 62–63); Hoopeston, Illinois, U.S.

Playing career
- 1981–1985: Loyola (IL)
- 1987–1989: Newcastle Scorpions
- Position: Point guard

Coaching career (HC unless noted)
- 1989–1993: NC State (assistant)
- 1993–1996: Evansville
- 1997–2022: Cal Poly

Head coaching record
- Overall: 325–454 (.417)
- Tournaments: 0–1 (NCAA), 0–3 (WNIT)

Accomplishments and honors

Championships
- Big West Conference (2013)

Awards
- 2× Big West Coach of the Year (2000, 2011)

Faith Mimnaugh (born 1963) is an American collegiate basketball coach, who until 2022, was the head women's basketball coach at Cal Poly, a position she held since 1997. Prior to Cal Poly, she served as head coach at Evansville from 1994 to 1996.

Mimnaugh recorded her 300th career win as coach in November 2019. While her 325 coaching victories at Cal Poly are recognized as the most wins in Mustang Women's basketball history, her 392 losses rank her as the coach with the most losses in the history of the university and Big West Conference. Additionally, under her leadership, her Cal Poly teams experienced 8 winning seasons out of 25 she coached. Mimnaugh's Mustangs also earned one NCAA Tournament and three WNIT Tournament bids during her tenure, however, the Mustangs lost each opening round game.

== Biography ==
Faith Mimnaugh and her fraternal twin sister Joy were born prematurely in Hoopeston, Illinois, and raised in Elk Grove Village. She would attend her older brother Tim's basketball games at Elk Grove High School and wanted to play the sport herself. Since there was not a girls' basketball team at her middle school, she played and became a starter for the boys' team. In her senior year of high school (1981), she helped the Elk Grove Grenadiers win the Class AA state championship.

== Playing career ==
Mimnaugh played collegiately at Loyola University Chicago. In the 1984–85 season, she led the nation in assists (316) and still holds the school career record of 1,000. Upon graduating, she toured the world with a Christian-based sports group and was asked to play semi-professionally in Newcastle, New South Wales, where she also helped coach, from 1987 to 1989.

== Coaching career ==
Seeking employment in the United States, Mimnaugh applied and was accepted as an assistant coach for Kay Yow at North Carolina State University. The Wolfpack won the regular season title, in Mimnaugh's first year, and the ACC tournament title, the following year (1991). In 1993, the University of Evansville named Mimnaugh as the head coach of its women's basketball team. During her tenure, the Purple Aces transitioned from the Midwest Collegiate Athletic Conference to the Missouri Valley Conference. She resigned as head coach midway through the 1995–96 season with a 7–62 record.

In 1996, Mimnaugh became an assistant coach at Cal Poly and was promoted to head coach, the following year. In 2011 and 2012, her teams were regular season champions; in 2013, the Mustangs won the Big West tournament and advanced to the NCAA tournament for the first time in program history.

=== Head coaching record ===
Record table
Season	Team	Overall	Conference	Standing	Postseason
Evansville Purple Aces (MWCC*/MVC) (1993–1996)
1993–94	Evansville	2–25	0–12*		
1994–95	Evansville	4–22	2–16		
1995–96	Evansville	1–15 (resigned)	1–8		
Evansville:		7–62 (.101)	3–36 (.077)		
Cal Poly Mustangs (Big West Conference) (1997–2022)
1997–98	Cal Poly	6–20	3–12		
1998–99	Cal Poly	8–18	2–13		
1999–2000	Cal Poly	9–19	5–10		
2000–01	Cal Poly	12–17	5–9		
2001–02	Cal Poly	11–17	7–9		
2002–03	Cal Poly	10–17	6–10		
2003–04	Cal Poly	14–14	10–8		
2004–05	Cal Poly	11–16	5–13		
2005–06	Cal Poly	13–14	7–7		
2006–07	Cal Poly	14–14	9–5		
2007–08	Cal Poly	13–19	8–8		
2008–09	Cal Poly	21–11	11–5		
2009–10	Cal Poly	18–11	11–5		
2010–11	Cal Poly	18–13	12–4		WNIT First Round
2011–12	Cal Poly	17–15	12–4		WNIT First Round
2012–13	Cal Poly	21–11	13–5		NCAA first round
2013–14	Cal Poly	18–14	11–5		WNIT First Round
2014–15	Cal Poly	15–14	10–6		
2015–16	Cal Poly	15–16	7–9		
2016–17	Cal Poly	11–18	7–9		
2017–18	Cal Poly	17–12	11–5		
2018–19	Cal Poly	6–21	3–13		
2019–20	Cal Poly	11–18	6–10		
2020–21	Cal Poly	13-11	8-8		
2021–22	Cal Poly	3-22	2-13		
Cal Poly:		325–392 (.453)	201–205 (.495)		
Total:		332–454 (.422)			
