= Sharon Chatman =

American basketball player (1947–2020)

Biographical details
- Born: December 15, 1947; Texas, U.S.
- Died: December 22, 2020 (aged 73); Santa Clara County, California, U.S.

Playing career
- 1968–1970: Cal Poly
- Position: Point guard

Coaching career (HC unless noted)
- 1970–1973: Andrew Hill HS
- 1973–1974: Cal Poly
- 1974–1976: De Anza
- 1976–1986: San Jose State

Head coaching record
- Overall: 148–133 (college); 61–3 (junior college)
- Tournaments: 0–4

Accomplishments and honors

Championships
- NorCal Conference (1978, 1979)

Sharon Ann Chatman (December 15, 1947 – December 22, 2020) was an American college basketball coach, a lawyer, and a judge.

Chatman was the head coach at San Jose State from 1976 to 1986. Chatman subsequently change careers, graduated from law school, served as a deputy district attorney, and was a senior judge of the Superior Court of Santa Clara County, California, prior to her death.

== Early life and education ==
Born in Texas, Chatman grew up in Bakersfield, California. After high school, Chatman attended Bakersfield College and transferred to California Polytechnic State University, where she played point guard for the Cal Poly Mustangs women's basketball team from 1968 to 1970 and graduated with a B.S. in physical education and later a master's degree. During her college basketball career, she twice achieved triple-doubles.

== Coaching career ==
After graduating from Cal Poly, she was a physical education teacher and girls' basketball coach at Andrew P. Hill High School in San Jose from 1970 to 1973. For the 1973–74 school year, Chatman returned to Cal Poly as a women's basketball coach, where she had a 5–12 record.

From 1974 to 1976, Chatman was head women's basketball coach at De Anza College, a junior college in Cupertino, California. In two seasons, her De Anza Dons teams compiled a win-loss record of 61–3.

Chatman was head coach at San Jose State from 1976 to 1986. She is the only coach in the history of the Spartans basketball team to compile a winning record; her ten-season overall win-loss record was 143–121, with a conference win-loss record of 60–54. For six consecutive seasons under Chatman, the Spartans had a winning record. They won 24 and 22 games in 1979 and 1980, respectively, and won the NorCal Conference championship both years. Chatman is the only women's basketball coach to lead the Spartans in post-season tournament play, coaching them to four consecutive AIAW tournament berths from 1978, 1979, 1980 and 1981.

In recognition of the achievements of her Spartans teams, she was honored as the San Jose State University Women's Basketball Coach of the Century, and she was inducted into the SJSU Sports Hall of Fame in 2004.

== Legal career ==
Chatman changed careers in 1986, retired from coaching, and attended the University of California, Hastings College of Law at the age of 38. After graduating from Hastings in 1989, she accepted a position as a deputy prosecutor in the Santa Clara County District Attorney's Office, where she prosecuted gang violence, sexual assault and murder cases over ten years.

=== Judicial career ===
While Chatman was a prosecutor, she was recruited by Judge Eugene Hyman to accept a position as a judge. Chatman eventually became Gov. Gray Davis' first superior court appointment in Santa Clara County in 2000. During here tenure as judge, she has supervised the Superior Court's three dedicated domestic violence courts where she helped to develop many changes, including a specialized court for mentally ill domestic violence defendants and a special project for defendants with children. She presided over numerous sexual assault and murder trials and is currently assigned to the Family Law Division.

Chatman served on the national faculty for the National Judicial Institute on Domestic Violence and National Institute on Fatherhood, Visitation and Domestic Violence. She made frequent presentations and appearances at schools and community groups, and was the inspiration for the 2005 founding Building Peaceful Families (BPF), a nonprofit entity whose mission is to foster the health and safety of children through better parenting.

Chatman presided over the trial of Robert Roy Farmer, who pled guilty to killing 21 cats and sexually abusing a dead cat. The high-profile trial went from 2015 to 2017; Chatman sentenced Farmer to 16 years in jail.

Chatman retired from the bench in early 2020. She died at home on December 22, 2020, due to complications from a brain tumor.

== Awards and honors ==
She was the recipient of numerous community service awards, including the Santa Clara County Bar Association's Unsung Hero Award; the NAACP Social Justice Award; the Commission on the Status of Women - Woman of Vision Award; the California Judges Association – Alba Witkins Humanitarian Award for outstanding service to the community; 10 Most Influential African Americans in the Bay Area; and California Probation Officers Chief's Association Judicial Officer of the Year.

== Head coaching record ==
Record table
Season	Team	Overall	Conference	Standing	Postseason
Cal Poly Mustangs (Southern California Athletic Association) (1973–1974)
1973–74	Cal Poly	5–12	2–8		
San Jose State:		5–12 (.294)	2–8 (.200)		
San Jose State Spartans (NorCal Conference) (1976–1982)
1976–77	San Jose State	10–10	4–7	4th	
1977–78	San Jose State	17–10	12–0	1st	
1978–79	San Jose State	24–4	12–0	1st	
1979–80	San Jose State	22–9	9–3	2nd	
1980–81	San Jose State	14–13	8–4	2nd	
1981–82	San Jose State	15–12	7–5	3rd	
San Jose State Spartans (NorPac Conference) (1982–1986)
1982–83	San Jose State	17–9	8–6	5th	
1983–84	San Jose State	9–17	5–9	6th	
1984–85	San Jose State	9–17	3–9	7th	
1985–86	San Jose State	6–20	1–11	7th	
San Jose State:		143–121 (.542)	64–54 (.542)		
Total:		148–133 (.527)			
National champion Postseason invitational champion Conference regular season champion Conference regular season and conference tournament champion Division regular season champion Division regular season and conference tournament champion Conference tournament champion

== See also ==
- List of African-American jurists
