= Maryalyce Jeremiah =

American basketball coach (born 1943)

Maryalyce Jeremiah (born March 4, 1943) is an American former basketball coach and executive. From the late 1960s to early 1980s, Jeremiah was a high school coach before she continued her experience at Cedarville College and the University of Dayton. With Dayton, her team were the runner-ups at the 1979 AIAW National Small College Basketball Championship and won the 1980 AIAW National Division II Basketball Championship. While at Indiana University between 1980 and 1986, her team reached the regional semifinals at the 1983 NCAA Division I women's basketball tournament. That year, Jeremiah was a coach at the National Sports Festival. After joining Cal State Fullerton in 1985, her team was in the second round of the 1991 NCAA Division I women's basketball tournament.

During this time period with Fullerton, she received two Big West Conference Women's Basketball Coach of the Year awards and the Carol Eckman Award. Between 1991 and 2003, Jeremiah stopped coaching to work as a women's administrator and associate athletic director with Fullerton. With the NCAA Division I Women's Basketball Committee, she started a four-year tenure in 1998 and became their chairperson in 2000. After resuming coaching in 2003, Jeremiah had a combined total of 440 wins and 348 losses in women's basketball upon ending her career in 2009. In the mid-2010s, she was the Interim Director of Athletics for California State University, Dominguez Hills. Jeremiah became part of the Cedarville University Athletic Hall of Fame in 1984 and the Ohio Basketball Hall of Fame in 2008.

== Early life and education ==
Jeremiah was born in Toledo, Ohio on March 4, 1943. During her youth, Jeremiah participated on a high school basketball team. From 1961 to 1965, she played basketball for Cedarville College. With the volleyball and basketball teams, she received Most Valuable Player awards during the mid-1960s. She was also on their softball team during this time period. By 1967, Jeremiah had also attended Central State College and Ohio State University. During the early 1970s, Jeremiah continued her studies with Ohio State.

== Career ==
=== Ohio ===
As a teacher throughout the late 1960s, Jeremiah started out at Fairborn Junior High School before going to the University of Dayton. During this time period, Jeremiah was a coach while at Fairborn and with a junior varsity team at Dayton. In 1966, she became a basketball referee. During 1969, she started her women's basketball coach position at Cedarville. The following year, they appeared at the Women's Invitational Intercollegiate Basketball Tournament. While competing in the Association for Intercollegiate Athletics for Women, the school was a semifinalist during the 1973 Midwest Regional Women's Intercollegiate Basketball Tournament. She accumulated 104 wins and 75 losses before ending her coaching position in 1978.

That year, Jeremiah joined the women's basketball team at Dayton. At the 1979 AIAW National Small College Basketball Championship, Jeremiah's team were runner-ups. That year, she became a commissioner for the AIAW. The following year, her team won the 1980 AIAW National Division II Basketball Championship. She had 69 wins and 5 losses upon leaving Dayton in 1980.

In other positions, Jeremiah became an assistant professor for Cedarville's Physical Education Department in 1973. By 1975, Jeremiah was working as a professor. That year, she was an AAU basketball player with Ted's Marathon. As the women's tennis coach for Cedarville during the mid-1970s, her team had 4 wins and 8 losses. In 1978, she was a sports information director while at Dayton. Two years later, she led the MAIAW Division II Basketball Committee.

=== Indiana ===
During 1980, Jeremiah joined Indiana University to continue her coaching career. At the time, Ohio State and Seattle University were her other options. In 1981, Indiana was a quarter-finalist in the Midwest Regionals as an AIAW school. That year, Indiana joined the NCAA Division I. During the 1983 NCAA Division I women's basketball tournament, her team reached the semifinals of the Mideast Regional. She had 90 wins and 63 losses when she left Indiana in 1985. Outside of basketball, she had considered working in medicine by the early 1980s.

=== California ===
In 1985, Jeremiah began her coaching tenure at Cal State Fullerton. At the time of her hiring, she considered studying law. Fullerton played in the first round of the 1989 NCAA Division I women's basketball tournament. With Jeremiah as their coach, it was the first time that Fullerton competed at the NCAA event. At the 1991 NCAA Division I women's basketball tournament, they reached the second round.

In 1991, Jeremiah became Fullerton's senior women's administrator temporarily. She was selected to help "find a replacement for men's basketball coach John Sneed" while working at Fullerton during April 1992. In May 1992, Jeremiah stopped working as a coach when she was selected as their permanent administrator. She also became Fullerton's associate athletic director that month. During a November 1992 proposal, she was one of several people that agreed to end football at Fullerton. In 1997, she helped find a new women's basketball coach when Deborah Ayres left the position. In the early 2000s, Jeremiah held her directorship in a senior position. Jeremiah was also a "[finalist] to become athletic director" during 2001.

In 2003, Jeremiah resumed her coaching tenure at Fullerton after she ended her directorship. After finishing her coaching tenure in 2009, she had a combined total of 177 wins and 205 losses for Fullerton. That year, Fullerton named her as an emeritus. In November 2014, she was working with Hope International University as part of their Sports Management department when she became the Interim Director of Athletics for California State University, Dominguez Hills. She remained with Dominguez Hills until June 2015.

=== Additional positions ===
As an author, Jeremiah released Coaching Basketball: Ten Winning Concepts in 1979 and Basketball: The Woman's Game in 1983. At the 1983 National Sports Festival, she was the women's basketball coach for the North. During the event, her players finished in fourth place. In 1991, she worked on the planned creation of the Women's Basketball Hall of Fame.

After Jeremiah started a four-year tenure on the NCAA Division I Women's Basketball Committee in 1998, she became the chairperson in 2000. In the early 2000s, Jeremiah helped organize the NCAA Division I women's basketball tournament. By the early 2010s, she had become a motivational speaker. During March 2015, she was chosen to be a sports commentator at the Women's Basketball Championship held by the Golden State Athletic Conference.

== Awards and honors ==
While at Dayton, Jeremiah was the AIAW Coach of the Year for small colleges during the 1980 Margaret Wade Trophy Dinner. From the Women's Sports Foundation, she was also the Division II Coach of the Year. At Indiana, Jeremiah was an NCAA Division I Coach of the Year nominee during 1983. For Cal State Fullerton, she was the Big West Conference Women's Basketball Coach of the Year during 1988 and 1991.

Jeremiah received the Carol Eckman Award from the Women's Basketball Coaches Association in 1990. Jeremiah joined the Cedarville University Athletic Hall of Fame in 1984 and the Ohio Basketball Hall of Fame in 2008. She was one of the Atlantic 10 Basketball Legends for 2014.
