= Dan Ayala =

American basketball coach (1937–2018)

Biographical details
- Born: April 29, 1937; Roswell, New Mexico, U.S.
- Died: September 17, 2018 (aged 81); Las Vegas, Nevada, U.S.

Coaching career (HC unless noted)
- 1973–1975: UNLV (assistant)
- 1975–1980: UNLV

Head coaching record
- Overall: 109–23

Dan Ayala (April 29, 1937 – September 17, 2018) was an American college basketball coach. He was the women's basketball head coach at the University of Nevada, Las Vegas from 1975 to 1980.

He died on September 17, 2018, in Las Vegas, Nevada at age 81.
