= 2014 Big West Conference women's basketball tournament =

- Classification: Division I
- Season: 2013–14
- Teams: 8
- Site: Walter Pyramid; Honda Center; Long Beach, CA; Anaheim, California
- Champions: Cal State Northridge (1st title)
- Winning coach: Jason Flowers (1st title)
- Television: ESPN3; FS PRIME/FCS Pacific

2013–14 Big West women's basketball standings
	Conf.				Overall
Team	W		L	PCT	W		L	PCT
Cal State Northridge†	12	–	4	.750	18	–	15	.545
Cal Poly	11	–	5	.688	18	–	14	.563
Hawaii	10	–	6	.625	17	–	14	.548
UC Irvine	9	–	7	.563	17	–	15	.531
UC Davis	9	–	7	.563	15	–	16	.484
Long Beach State	8	–	8	.500	17	–	15	.531
Cal State Fullerton	8	–	8	.500	12	–	18	.400
UC Santa Barbara	3	–	13	.188	8	–	22	.267
UC Riverside	2	–	14	.125	6	–	23	.207
† 2014 Big West tournament winner As of 10:03, 1 April 2014 (UTC); Rankings from AP poll

The 2014 Big West Conference women's basketball tournament took place March 11–15, 2014. The first two rounds took place at Walter Pyramid while the semifinals and championship were at the Honda Center in Anaheim, California. The winner of the tournament received the conference's automatic bid to the 2014 NCAA Women's Division I Basketball Tournament.

== Format ==
The top eight teams qualified for the 2014 Big West tournament. Seeds 1 & 2 received a double-bye while seeds 3 and 4 receive a single bye. The first round featured 5 vs. 8 and 6 vs. 7. The lowest remaining seed moved on to play seed 3 in the quarterfinals while the other winner moved on to play seed 4 in the quarterfinals. The lowest remaining seed from the quarterfinals moved on to play seed 1 in the semifinals while the other remaining seed played seed 2 in the semifinals.

== Bracket ==
First round Tuesday, March 11; ESPN3
5	UC Davis	58
8	UC Santa Barbara	57
6	Long Beach State	64
7	Cal State Fullerton	60

Quarterfinals (Re-Seeded); Wednesday, March 12; ESPN3
4	UC Irvine	74
5	UC Davis	70
3	Hawaiʻi	52
6	Long Beach State	49

Semifinals (Re-Seeded); Friday, March 14; ESPN3
1	Cal State Northridge	78
4	UC Irvine	60
2	Cal Poly	66
3	Hawaiʻi	52

Championship game Saturday, March 15; FS PRIME/FCS Pacific
1	Cal State Northridge	73
2	Cal Poly	58
