= 2019 Big West Conference women's basketball tournament =

Women's Basketball Tournament

- Classification: Division I
- Season: 2018–19
- Teams: 8
- First round site: Bren Events Center; Irvine, CA
- Quarterfinals site: Bren Events Center; Irvine, CA
- Semifinals site: Honda Center; Anaheim, CA
- Finals site: Honda Center; Anaheim, CA
- Champions: UC Davis (2nd title)
- Winning coach: Jennifer Gross (2nd title)
- Television: ESPN3

2018–19 Big West women's basketball standings
	Conf.				Overall
Team	W		L	PCT	W		L	PCT
UC Davis †	15	–	1	.938	25	–	7	.781
UC Riverside	10	–	6	.625	17	–	15	.531
Cal State Northridge	10	–	6	.625	16	–	15	.516
Hawai'i	10	–	6	.625	15	–	16	.484
UC Irvine	8	–	8	.500	20	–	11	.645
Cal State Fullerton	6	–	10	.375	14	–	16	.467
Long Beach State	5	–	11	.313	9	–	22	.290
UC Santa Barbara	5	–	11	.313	8	–	22	.267
Cal Poly	3	–	13	.188	6	–	21	.222
† 2019 Big West tournament winner As of March 17, 2019; Rankings from AP poll

The 2019 Big West Conference women's basketball tournament was the postseason women's basketball tournament that took place March 12–16, 2019, at two venues in the Los Angeles area. The first two rounds were scheduled for the Bren Events Center in Irvine, California, while the semifinals and championship were held at the Honda Center in Anaheim. The winner of the Big West tournament receives the conference's automatic bid to the 2019 NCAA Women's Division I Basketball Tournament. UC Davis won the conference tournament championship game over Hawai'i, 58–50.

== Seeds ==
Seed	School	Conference	Overall	Tiebreaker
1	UC Davis	15–1	23–6	
2	Hawaii	10–6	14–15	2–0 vs. UCSB
3	UC Riverside	10–6	16–14	1–1 vs. UCSB, 2–0 vs. UCI
4	Cal State Northridge	10–6	16–14	1–1 vs. UCSB, 1–1 vs. UCI
5	UC Irvine	8–8	18–10	
6	Cal State Fullerton	6–10	14–15	
7	Long Beach State	5–11	8–21	1–1 vs. UCSB, 1–1 vs. CSUF
8	UC Santa Barbara	5–11	8–21	1–1 vs. LGBU, 0–2 vs. CSUF

== Schedule ==
Session	Game	Time*	Matchup^{#}	Television	Attendance
First round – Tuesday, March 12
1	1	6:00 PM	#5 UC Irvine vs. #8 UC Santa Barbara	ESPN3	
1	2	8:30 PM	#6 Cal State Fullerton vs. #7 Long Beach State	ESPN3	
Quarterfinals – Wednesday, March 13
2	3	6:00 PM	#3 UC Riverside vs. #7 Long Beach State	ESPN3	
2	4	8:30 PM	#4 Cal State Northridge vs. #5 UC Irvine	ESPN3	
Semifinals – Friday, March 15
3	5	12:00 PM	#1 UC Davis vs. #5 UC Irvine	ESPN3	
3	6	2:30 PM	#2 Hawaii vs. #3 UC Riverside	ESPN3	
Championship Game – Saturday, March 16
4	7	3:30 PM	#1 UC Davis vs. #2 Hawaii	ESPN3	
*Game Times in PT. #-Rankings denote tournament seeding.

== Bracket ==
First round Tuesday, March 12; ESPN3
5	UC Irvine	53
8	UCSB	46
6	Cal State Fullerton	54
7	Long Beach State	60

Quarterfinals (Re-Seeded); Wednesday, March 13; ESPN3
4	Cal State Northridge	57
5	UC Irvine	59
3	UC Riverside	67
7	Long Beach State	50

Semifinals (Re-Seeded); Friday, March 15; ESPN3
1	UC Davis	82
5	UC Irvine	50
2	Hawaii	66
3	UC Riverside	58

Championship game Saturday, March 16; ESPN3
1	UC Davis	58
2	Hawaii	50

== See also ==
- 2019 Big West Conference men's basketball tournament
