= Pam DeCosta =

Personal information
- Born: August 27, 1964 (age 62) Denver, Colorado, U.S.

Career information
- High school: Lutheran (Denver, Colorado)
- College: Mesa State (1982–1986)
- Playing career: 1986–1987
- Coaching career: 1990–present

Career history

Playing
- 1986–1987: Oberhausen

Coaching
- 1990–1992: Metro State (asst.)
- 1992–1993: Denver East HS (girls' varsity)
- 1993–1996: Kansas (asst.)
- 1996–1998: Oklahoma (asst.)
- 1998–2003: Kansas (asst.)
- 2003–2007: Lynn
- 2007–2011: San Jose State
- 2011–2019: Oklahoma (asst.)

Career highlights
- As player: First-team All-RMAC (1986)

Pamela Suzette DeCosta (born August 27, 1964) is an American college basketball coach, most recently as a women's basketball assistant coach at Oklahoma. Born in Denver, DeCosta played college basketball at Mesa State College and received her bachelor's degree at Metropolitan State University of Denver in 1991.

== Head coaching record ==
Record table
Season	Team	Overall	Conference	Standing	Postseason
Lynn Fighting Knights (Sunshine State Conference) (2003–2007)
2003–04	Lynn	5–22	1–13		
2004–05	Lynn	12–16	6–10		
2005–06	Lynn	11–17	6–10		
2006–07	Lynn	17–11	9–7	4th	
Lynn:		45–66 (.405)	22–40 (.355)		
San Jose State Spartans (Western Athletic Conference) (2007–2011)
2007–08	San Jose State	3–28	1–15	9th	
2008–09	San Jose State	2–28	1–15	9th	
2009–10	San Jose State	6–23	2–14	9th	
2010–11	San Jose State	2–27	2–14	9th	
San Jose State:		13–106 (.109)	6–58 (.094)		
Total:		58–167 (.258)			
