= Janice Joseph-Richard =

American basketball coach and former player

Biographical details
- Born: February 19, 1964; Alexandria, Louisiana, U.S.
- Died: December 1, 2010 (aged 46); Alexandria, Louisiana, U.S.

Playing career
- 1982–1986: Louisiana College
- 1987–1991: PS Karlsruhe Lions
- Position: Point guard

Coaching career (HC unless noted)
- 1987–1992: Southeastern Louisiana (AC)
- 1992–1998: Xavier (LA)
- 1999–2006: San Jose State
- 2007–2010: Louisiana College

Head coaching record
- Overall: 307–163 (.653)

Accomplishments and honors

Awards
- GCAC Coach of the Year (1994, 1996, 1997, 1998); WAC Coach of the Year (2002); ASC East Coach of the Year (2010); Louisiana Sports Hall of Fame (2016); Xavier athletics Hall of Fame (2022)

Janice Joseph-Richard (née Richard; February 19, 1964 – December 1, 2010) was an American basketball coach who coached the San Jose State Spartans, Xavier Gold Nuggets, and Louisiana College Lady Wildcats.

== Early life ==
Joseph-Richard was born on February 19, 1964, and raised in Alexandria, Louisiana, where she attended and played basketball at Peabody Magnet High School. After graduating, she went on to play for Louisiana College (now Louisiana Christian University), where, in 1986, she would lead to team to a #1 ranking and a third-place finish at the NAIA National Championship. While at Louisiana College, she amassed over 2,300 points had had 700 assists and was selected as an NAIA first-team All-American selection in both 1985 and 1986.

After graduating, Joseph Richard played basketball in Europe for the PS Karlsruhe Lions, winning a European league title.

== Coaching career ==
In 1987, Richard would become an assistant coach at Southeastern Louisiana under former Louisiana College head coach, Frank Schneider. In 1992, she became the head coach of the Xavier Gold Nuggets, coaching the team to five consecutive NAIA tournament appearances and being named the GCAC Coach of the Year four times. In 1998, she resigned as head coach at Xavier to move to California for a marriage.

A year later, she returned to coaching, being hired as the head coach for the San Jose State Spartans. Over her tenure as the Spartans' head coach, she guided the team to its first winning season in 18 years, though fell shy of a conference title. She was named as the 2002 WAC coach for her turnaround of the team. She coached the team for seven seasons, before taking medical leave to fight breast cancer, and moving back to Louisiana.

After recovering from her cancer treatments, she was hired to coach for her alma mater, the Louisiana College Lady Wildcats. As head coach Joseph-Richard lead the team to a first round appearance at the 2010 NCAA Division III Tournament.

After the 2009–10 season, Joseph-Richard again took a leave of absence to treat her breast cancer, though she would not return, passing from her cancer on December 1, 2010.

== Legacy ==
In 2016, Joseph-Richard was inducted to the Louisiana Sports Hall of Fame. In 2022, she was inducted to Xavier athletics' Hall of Fame.

== Head coaching record ==
Record table
Season	Team	Overall	Conference	Standing	Postseason
Xavier Gold Nuggets (Gulf Coast Athletic Conference) (1992–1998)
1992–93	Xavier	21–8	12–4	3rd	
1993–94	Xavier	28–4	15–1	T–1st	NAIA Division I First Round
1994–95	Xavier	25–5	14–2	1st	NAIA Division I Second Round
1995–96	Xavier	28–6	16–2	1st	NAIA Division I Second Round
1996–97	Xavier	29–7	16–2	1st	NAIA Division I Second Round
1997–98	Xavier	28–4	18–0	1st	NAIA Division I Second Round
Xavier:		159–34 (.824)			
San Jose State Spartans (Western Athletic Conference) (1999–2006)
1999–2000	San Jose State	3–24	1–13	8th	
2000–01	San Jose State	13–16	4–12	T–7th	
2001–02	San Jose State	17–11	12–6	4th	
2002–03	San Jose State	13–15	9–9	T–4th	
2003–04	San Jose State	16–13	7–11	T–6th	
2004–05	San Jose State	18–12	12–9	T–4th	
2005–06	San Jose State	13–15	8–8	T–4th	
San Jose State:		93–106 (.467)	53–68 (.438)		
Louisiana College Lady Wildcats (American Southwest Conference) (2007–2010)
2007–08	Louisiana College	16–10	12–8	4th (East)	
2008–09	Louisiana College	16–19	12–8	T–3rd (East)	
2009–10	Louisiana College	24–3	17–2	1st (East)	NCAA Division III First Round
Louisiana College:		55–23 (.705)	41–18 (.695)		
Total:		307–163 (.653)			
National champion Postseason invitational champion Conference regular season champion Conference regular season and conference tournament champion Division regular season champion Division regular season and conference tournament champion Conference tournament champion
