= 1981 NAIA women's basketball tournament =

- Teams: 8
- Finals site: , Kansas City, Missouri
- Champions: Kentucky State (1st title, 1st title game, 1st Fab Four)
- Runner-up: Texas Southern (1st title game, 1st Fab Four)
- Semifinalists: Northern State (1st Fab Four); Azusa Pacific (1st Fab Four)
- Chuck Taylor MVP: Carolyn Walker (Kentucky State)
- Top scorer: Nerissa Redo (Texas Southern) (59 points)

The 1981 NAIA women's basketball tournament was the inaugural tournament held by the NAIA to determine the national champion of women's college basketball among its members in the United States and Canada.

Kentucky State defeated Texas Southern in the championship game, 73–67, to claim the Thorobrettes' first NAIA national title.

The tournament was played in Kansas City, Missouri.

== Qualification ==
The inaugural tournament field was set at eight teams. All teams were seeded.

The tournament utilized a simple single-elimination format, with an additional third-place game for the two semifinal losers.

Qualified Teams
School	Appearance	Last Bid
Azusa Pacific	1st	Never
Berry	1st	Never
Kentucky State	1st	Never
Missouri Western	1st	Never
Northern State	1st	Never
Saginaw Valley State	1st	Never
Texas Southern	1st	Never
Virginia State	1st	Never

== Bracket ==
Quarterfinals
1	Texas Southern	85
8	Virginia State	57
5	Northern State	57
4	Missouri Western	53
3	Azusa Pacific	65
6	Saginaw Valley	53
7	Kentucky State	66
2	Berry	65

Semifinals
1	Texas Southern	76
5	Northern State	58
3	Azusa Pacific	56
7	Kentucky State	65

National championship
1	Texas Southern	67
7	Kentucky State	73
National third place
5	Northern State	74
3	Azusa Pacific	65

== See also ==
- 1981 AIAW National Division I Basketball Championship
- 1981 AIAW National Division II Basketball Championship
- 1981 AIAW National Division III Basketball Championship
- 1981 NAIA men's basketball tournament
