= 1981 AIAW National Division III Basketball Championship =

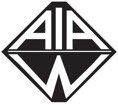

Tournament information
- Administrator: Association for Intercollegiate Athletics for Women
- Host(s): University of Wisconsin–La Crosse
- Venue(s): La Crosse, Wisconsin
- Participants: 16

Final positions
- Champions: Wisconsin–La Crosse (1st title)
- Runner-up: Mount Mercy

Tournament statistics
- Matches played: 16

The 1981 AIAW National Division III Basketball Championship was the second annual tournament hosted by the Association for Intercollegiate Athletics for Women to determine the national champion of collegiate basketball among its Division III members in the United States.

The tournament was held at the University of Wisconsin–La Crosse in La Crosse, Wisconsin.

Wisconsin–La Crosse defeated Mount Mercy in the championship game, 79–71, to capture the Roonies' first AIAW Division III national title.

== Format ==
Sixteen teams participated in a single-elimination tournament, a decrease in eight teams from the previous year's championship.

The tournament also included a third-place game for the two teams that lost in the semifinal games.

== Tournament bracket ==
First round
Worcester State	68
Wisconsin–Whitewater	66
Elizabethtown	71
Columbia (SC)	56
UC Davis	67
Concordia (OR)	48
Mount Mercy	68
Spring Arbor	52
Pitt Johnstown	79
Bethany	58
Knoxville	72
Rhode Island College	60
San Francisco State	56
Tarleton State	54
Wisconsin–La Crosse	87
Roanoke	77

Quarterfinals
Worcester State	67
Elizabethtown	59
UC Davis	53
Mount Mercy	58
Pitt Johnstown	54
Knoxville	47
San Francisco State	71
Wisconsin–La Crosse	78

Semifinals
Worcester State	61
Mount Mercy	66
Pitt Johnstown	60
Wisconsin–La Crosse	70

National championship
Mount Mercy	71
Wisconsin–La Crosse	79
Third place final
Worcester State	82*
Pitt Johnstown	78

== See also ==
- 1981 AIAW National Division I Basketball Championship
- 1981 AIAW National Division II Basketball Championship
- 1981 NAIA women's basketball tournament
