= Misty Thomas =

Canadian basketball player

Personal information
- Born: 1 July 1964 (age 61); Santa Monica, California, U.S.

Career highlights
- PCAA Tournament MVP (1986)

Misty Thomas (born 1 July 1964) is a Canadian basketball player. She competed in the women's tournament at the 1984 Summer Olympics, and became the first Canadian to compete at both the Olympics and the Paralympics.

== Biography ==
Thomas was born in Santa Monica, California, before moving to Windsor, Ontario when she was five years old. Thomas took up basketball as a student at Vincent Massey High School, and also became a junior champion in volleyball and badminton. At school, she was the leading points-scorer, and was part of the team that won the Ontario Basketball Championship in 1980. Thomas then went to University of Nevada, Las Vegas (UNLV ), where she also became the top scorer for the basketball team.

Thomas was part of the Canadian team at the 1983 Summer Universiade, the 1984 Summer Olympics, and the 1987 Pan American Games, winning a bronze medal at the latter. However, in 1985, Thomas suffered an ACL tear, which would require multiple knee operations, and go on to end her career. Thomas went on to work with the Canadian Wheelchair Basketball Association, and played with the national wheelchair team.

In 2008, Thomas represented Canada at the 2008 Summer Paralympics in Beijing, competing in the wheelchair basketball tournament.

Thomas was inducted into the UNLV Hall of Fame in 1997, and in 1998, became the youngest player to be inducted into the Canadian Basketball Hall of Fame.
