= 2018–19 UC Davis Aggies women's basketball team =

Intercollegiate basketball season

2018–19 UC Davis Aggies women's basketball
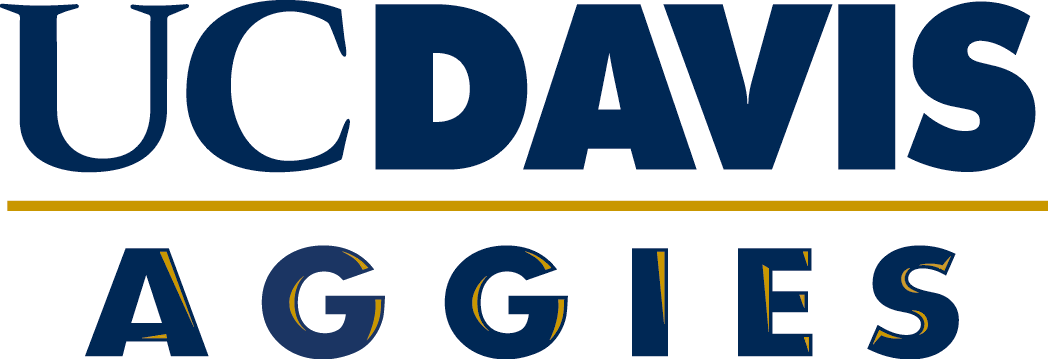

Big West regular-season champions Big West women's tournament champions

NCAA tournament, first round
- Conference: Big West Conference
- Record: 25–7 (15–1 Big West)
- Head coach: Jennifer Gross (9th season)
- Assistant coaches: Joe Teramoto; Des Abeyta; Matt Klemin
- Home arena: The Pavilion

2018–19 Big West women's basketball standings
	Conf.				Overall
Team	W		L	PCT	W		L	PCT
UC Davis †	15	–	1	.938	25	–	7	.781
UC Riverside	10	–	6	.625	17	–	15	.531
Cal State Northridge	10	–	6	.625	16	–	15	.516
Hawai'i	10	–	6	.625	15	–	16	.484
UC Irvine	8	–	8	.500	20	–	11	.645
Cal State Fullerton	6	–	10	.375	14	–	16	.467
Long Beach State	5	–	11	.313	9	–	22	.290
UC Santa Barbara	5	–	11	.313	8	–	22	.267
Cal Poly	3	–	13	.188	6	–	21	.222
† 2019 Big West tournament winner As of March 17, 2019; Rankings from AP poll

The 2018–19 UC Davis Aggies women's basketball team represented University of California, Davis during the 2018–19 NCAA Division I women's basketball season. The Aggies, led by ninth-year head coach Jennifer Gross, played their home games at The Pavilion in Davis, California as members of the Big West Conference. They finished the season 25–7, 15–1 in Big West play, to win the Big West regular-season title. They also won the Big West women's tournament and earned an automatic trip to the NCAA women's tournament for the first time since 2011. They lost to Stanford in the first round.

== Roster ==
2018–19 UC Davis Aggies women's basketball team
Players
Coaches

Pos.	#	Name	Height	Year	Previous school	Hometown
G	00	Mackenzie Trpcic	5 ft 7 in (1.7 m)	Jr	St. Mary's Catholic	Hamilton, ON
G	1	Brittany Nguyen	5 ft 4 in (1.63 m)	RS So	Pleasant Grove	Elk Grove, CA
G	2	Kourtney Eaton	5 ft 9 in (1.75 m)	Sr	Mark Morris	Longview, WA
G/F	3	Karley Eaton	5 ft 9 in (1.75 m)	Sr	Mark Morris	Longview, WA
F	5	Nina Bessolo	5 ft 11 in (1.8 m)	Jr	Castro Valley	Hayward, CA
G	10	Cierra McKeown	5 ft 9 in (1.75 m)	Jr	Touchet; Walla Walla CC	Touchet, WA
C	11	Sage Stobbart	6 ft 3 in (1.91 m)	RS Fr	Seycove Secondary	North Vancouver, BC
G	13	Katie Toole	5 ft 10 in (1.78 m)	RS Jr	Viewmont; Utah State	Farmington, UT
F/C	14	Emma Gibb	6 ft 2 in (1.88 m)	RS So	Western Mennonite	McMinnville, OR
G	15	Kaitlyn Hsu	5 ft 6 in (1.68 m)	Jr	Northwood	Irvine, CA
G	20	Makaila Sanders	5 ft 8 in (1.73 m)	Fr	Foothill	Sacramento, CA
F	21	Sophia Song	5 ft 11 in (1.8 m)	Jr	Mark Keppel	Monterey Park, CA
F	22	Morgan Bertsch	6 ft 4 in (1.93 m)	RS Sr	Santa Rosa	Santa Rosa, CA
F	23	Kayla Konrad	6 ft 0 in (1.83 m)	RS Fr	Valencia	Valencia, CA
F	32	Cierra Hall	6 ft 0 in (1.83 m)	So	Fairmont Prep	Cypress, CA

Head coach

- Jennifer Gross (UC Davis)

Assistant coach(es)

- Joe Teramoto (Cal Poly)
- Des Abeyta (UC Davis)
- Matt Klemin (Cal Poly)

Legend

- (C) Team captain
- (S) Suspended
- (I) Ineligible
- (W) Walk-on
- Injured
- Current redshirt

Roster
Last update: February 1, 2025

== Schedule and results ==
Date time, TV	Rank^{#}	Opponent^{#}	Result	Record	Site (attendance) city, state
Exhibition
November 1, 2018*; 5:30 p.m.		Cal State East Bay	W 94–41		The Pavilion; Davis, CA
Non-conference regular season
November 7, 2018*; 7:00 p.m.		at No. 7 Stanford	L 43–71	0–1	Maples Pavilion (2,471); Stanford, CA
November 11, 2018*; 2:00 p.m.		Pacific	L 80–83	0–2	The Pavilion (734); Davis, CA
November 16, 2018*; 6:00 p.m.		at Portland State	L 50–65	0–3	Viking Pavilion (342); Portland, OR
November 18, 2018*; 1:00 p.m.		at Washington State	W 75–62	1–3	Beasley Coliseum (585); Pullman, WA
November 23, 2018*; 5:00 p.m.		Southern Utah	W 68–45	2–3	The Pavilion (433); Davis, CA
November 27, 2018*; 12:00 p.m.		at Loyola Marymount	L 53–60	2–4	Gersten Pavilion (1,878); Los Angeles, CA
December 1, 2018*; 11:00 a.m.		vs. Nevada; 38th Lady Griz Classic semifinals	W 84–68	3–4	Dahlberg Arena (427); Missoula, MT
December 2, 2018*; 1:00 p.m.		at Montana; 38th Lady Griz Classic championship	L 56–62	3–5	Dahlberg Arena (2,443); Missoula, MT
December 5, 2018*; 7:00 p.m.		at Sacramento State	W 109–60	4–5	Hornets Nest (516); Sacramento, CA
December 9, 2018*; 1:00 p.m.		Seattle	W 76–59	5–5	The Pavilion (572); Davis, CA
December 15, 2018*; 3:00 p.m.		at San Francisco	W 70–68	6–5	War Memorial Gymnasium (432); San Francisco, CA
December 17, 2018*; 6:00 p.m.		Saint Mary's	W 76–74	7–5	The Pavilion (414); Davis, CA
December 29, 2018*; 2:00 p.m.		Doninican (CA)	W 92–42	8–5	The Pavilion (484); Davis, CA
Big West regular season
January 5, 2019; 2:00 p.m., ESPN3		at UC Riverside	W 67–59	9–5 (1–0)	SRC Arena (230); Riverside, CA
January 12, 2019; 3:00 p.m.		at Hawaii	L 60–65	9–6 (1–1)	Stan Sheriff Center (1,340); Honolulu, HI
January 17, 2019; 5:00 p.m.		Cal State Fullerton	W 75–51	10–6 (2–1)	The Pavilion (3,189); Davis, CA
January 19, 2019; 2:30 p.m.		UC Irvine	W 80–57	11–6 (3–1)	The Pavilion (2,090); Davis, CA
January 24, 2019; 7:00 p.m., ESPN3		at Cal State Northridge	W 60–49	12–6 (4–1)	Matadome (427); Northridge, CA
January 26, 2019; 2:00 p.m.		at Cal State Fullerton	W 75–39	13–6 (5–1)	Titan Gym (260); Fullerton, CA
January 31, 2019; 6:00 p.m.		Long Beach State	W 70–50	14–6 (6–1)	The Pavilion (451); Davis, CA
February 2, 2019; 2:00 p.m.		Cal State Northridge	W 70–54	15–6 (7–1)	The Pavilion (815); Davis, CA
February 7, 2019; 7:00 p.m.		at UC Santa Barbara	W 70–44	16–6 (8–1)	The Thunderdome (211); Santa Barbara, CA
February 9, 2019; 2:00 p.m.		at Cal Poly	W 70–44	17–6 (9–1)	Mott Athletic Center (964); San Luis Obispo, CA
February 14, 2019; 6:00 p.m.		UC Riverside	W 72–59	18–6 (10–1)	The Pavilion (488); Davis, CA
February 23, 2019; 2:00 p.m.		Hawaii	W 72–46	19–6 (11–1)	The Pavilion (934); Davis, CA
February 28, 2019; 7:00 p.m.		at Long Beach State	W 66–49	20–6 (12–1)	Walter Pyramid (497); Long Beach, CA
March 2, 2019; 2:00 p.m.		at UC Irvine	W 63–44	21–6 (13–1)	Bren Events Center (412); Irvine, CA
March 6, 2019; 6:00 p.m.		Cal Poly	W 87–54	22–6 (14–1)	The Pavilion (635); Davis, CA
March 9, 2019; 2:30 p.m.		UC Santa Barbara	W 80–44	23–6 (15–1)	The Pavilion (2,117); Davis, CA
Big West women's tournament
March 15, 2019; 12:00 p.m., ESPN3	(1)	vs. (5) UC Irvine; Semifinals	W 82–50	24–6	Honda Center; Anaheim, CA
March 16, 2019; 3:30 p.m., ESPN3	(1)	vs. (2) Hawaii; Championship game	W 58–50	25–6	Honda Center (1,346); Anaheim, CA
NCAA women's tournament
March 23, 2019*; 3:00 p.m., ESPN2	(15 C)	at (2 C) No. 7 Stanford; First Round	L 54–79	25–7	Maples Pavilion (3,456); Stanford, CA
*Non-conference game. ^{#}Rankings from AP poll. (#) Tournament seedings in parentheses. C=Chicago Region. All times are in Pacific.

== See also ==
- 2018–19 UC Davis Aggies men's basketball team
