= Cal Poly Mustangs women's basketball =

Cal Poly Mustangs
2026–27 Cal Poly Mustangs women's basketball team
- University: California Polytechnic State University, San Luis Obispo
- Head coach: Shanele Stires (5th season)
- Location: San Luis Obispo, California
- Arena: Mott Athletics Center (capacity: 3,032)
- Conference: Big West
- Nickname: Mustangs
- Colors: Poly green, copper gold, and stadium gold

NCAA Division I tournament appearances
- 2013

Conference tournament champions
- 2013

Conference regular-season champions
- 2011, 2012

Uniforms
Home	Away

The Cal Poly Mustangs women's basketball team represents California Polytechnic State University, located in San Luis Obispo, California. The school's team currently competes in the Big West Conference, which they have played in since 1996, two years after joining Division I. The team plays its home games in Mott Athletics Center.

== History ==
Cal Poly began playing women's basketball at the intercollegiate level in 1974 in the AIAW, with NCAA-sponsored play beginning in 1981.

The Mustangs have had three teams tie for the school record for wins (21) in a season: the 1981–82 squad coached by Marilyn McNeil and the 2008–09 and 2012–13 squads coached by Faith Mimnaugh.

Following Sharon Chatman (1974–75) and Mary Stallard (1975–79), McNeil coached Cal Poly from 1979 to 1986 before becoming an athletics administrator on campus. In 1994, McNeil departed Cal Poly to become the athletic director at Monmouth University, from which she retired in 2021. Taking over after Jill Orrock (1986–95) and Karen Booker (1995–97), Mimnaugh served as head coach from 1997 to 2022. Shanele Stires, former WNBA player and head coach at Cal State East Bay, was hired as the team's seventh head coach on April 14, 2022.

The furthest the team has advanced came in March 2013, when Cal Poly defeated Pacific 63–49 to win the Big West Conference women's basketball tournament, their first conference tournament championship after two previous years of regular-season titles. Seeded 14th in their ensuing NCAA Tournament appearance, they lost 85-55 to Penn State in the first round. Cal Poly qualified for the semifinal round of the Big West Tournament in March 2020, but the postseason was abruptly canceled due to COVID-19 after the Mustangs had won comfortably twice in the tournament's earlier rounds.

The team has made four WNIT appearances, losing to California (Berkeley) in 2011, Washington in 2012, San Diego in 2014, and Pacific in 2024.

== Division I Season-by-Season Results ==
Record table
Season	Coach	Overall	Conference	Standing	Postseason
Karen Booker (American West) (1995–1996)
1995-1996	Karen Booker	5–23	2–4		Member of American West during transition from DII to DI
Karen Booker (Big West Conference) (1996–1997)
1996–1997	Karen Booker	4–23	3–12	6th (West)	
Karen Booker win–loss total:		9–46			
Faith Mimnaugh (Big West Conference) (1997–2022)
1997–98	Faith Mimnaugh	6–20	3–12	6th (West)	
1998–99	Faith Mimnaugh	8–18	2–13	T–5th (West)	
1999–00	Faith Mimnaugh	9–19	5–10	T–4th (West)	
2000–01	Faith Mimnaugh	12–17	5–9	6th	
2001–02	Faith Mimnaugh	11–17	7–9	5th	
2002-03	Faith Mimnaugh	10–17	6–10	6th	
2003–04	Faith Mimnaugh	14–14	10–8	4th	
2004–05	Faith Mimnaugh	11–16	5–13	9th	
2005–06	Faith Mimnaugh	13–14	7–7	T–3rd	
2006–07	Faith Mimnaugh	14–14	9–5	T–3rd	
2007–08	Faith Mimnaugh	13–19	8–8	T–5th	
2008–09	Faith Mimnaugh	21–11	11–5	3rd	
2009–10	Faith Mimnaugh	18–11	11–5	T–2nd	
2010–11	Faith Mimnaugh	18–13	12–4	1st	WNIT First Round
2011–12	Faith Mimnaugh	17–15	12–4	1st	WNIT First Round
2012–13	Faith Mimnaugh	21–11	13–5	2nd	NCAA Tournament First Round
2013–14	Faith Mimnaugh	18–14	11–5	2nd	WNIT First Round
2014–15	Faith Mimnaugh	15–14	10–6	3rd	
2015–16	Faith Mimnaugh	15–16	7–9	6th	
2016–17	Faith Mimnaugh	11–18	7–9	7th	
2017–18	Faith Mimnaugh	17–12	11–5	2nd	
2018–19	Faith Mimnaugh	6–21	3–13	9th	
2019–20	Faith Mimnaugh	11–18	6–10	8th	Cancelled
2020–21	Faith Mimnaugh	13–11	8–8	6th	
2021–22	Faith Mimnaugh	3–22	2–13	11th	
Faith Mimnaugh win–loss total:		325–392			
Shanele Stires (Big West Conference) (2022–Present)
2022–23	Shanele Stires	10–18	7–12	7th	
2023–24	Shanele Stires	17–14	13–7	4th	WNIT First Round
2024–25	Shanele Stires	14–18	8–12	8th	
2025–26	Shanele Stires	4–26	2–18	11th	
Shanele Stires win–loss total:		45–76			
Total:		{{{overall}}}			
National champion Postseason invitational champion Conference regular season champion Conference regular season and conference tournament champion Division regular season champion Division regular season and conference tournament champion Conference tournament champion

== NCAA tournament results ==
Year	Seed	Round	Opponent	Result
2013	#14	First Round	#3 Penn State	L 55−85

== Pro Basketball Alumni ==
- Former Cal Poly forward Kristina Santiago won three consecutive (2013–15) Bulgarian NBL Playoffs MVP awards after leading her club, Dunav 8806, to consecutive titles. After a stint with Hapoel Rishon LeZion in Israel, Santiago rejoined Dunav 8806 in December 2013. The former All-America honorable mention then signed with Helios in Vétroz, Switzerland, before being acquired by BC Alte Kanti Aarau of the Swiss Ligue Nationale. She averaged 22.4 points (on 55.6-percent shooting) and 9.3 rebounds for Aarau in 2016-17.
- Rachel Clancy, a former third-team Academic All-American, played for Real Canoe Natación in Madrid during the fall of 2011.
- Molly Schlemer signed with the ChemCats Chemnitz of Germany in October 2014. In September 2015, following her All-EuroBasket rookie season, Schlemer was picked up by Urla Belediyesi Gencli in Turkey, where she was the TKBL’s third-leading scorer on the way to all-league second-team honors. Most recently in 2018, Schlemer led Edirne Belediyesi averaging 22.3 points (ranking No. 1 in the Turkish league) along with 11.7 rebounds (fourth throughout the TKBL).
- In 2019, alumni Dynn Leaupepe and Lynn Leaupepe became the fourth and fifth former Mustangs women's basketball players to embark on pro careers. Dynn Leaupepe, with Basketball Klubben Amager in the Copenhagen suburb of Kastrup, Denmark, finished her rookie year winning the Dameligaen Player of the Year accolade after leading her club to the Danish title, 3-1 in a five-game series over Stevnsgade.
- Meanwhile Lynn Leaupepe plays for the Sunbury Jets in Victoria, Australia. Sunbury, coached by Kennedy Kereama, trains at Boardman Stadium just over 25 miles northwest of Melbourne.
- In 2021-22, former Mustang Sierra Campisano played in the preseason with the WNBA's Chicago Sky, before signing with BKG Prima in Hungary. She averaged 16.7 points and 6.8 rebounds as a rookie overseas.
- Cal Poly graduate Kirsty Brown signed with the Leicester Riders of the Women's British Basketball League in August 2022.

== USA Basketball Participants ==
- (United States) Laura Buehning, a first-team WBCA College Division All-American in 1982 while playing for Cal Poly, played for Team USA at the 1980 William Jones Cup in Taiwan.
