= Tim LaKose =

American basketball coach

Current position
- Title: Head coach
- Team: Dominican (CA)
- Conference: PacWest
- Record: 65–48 (.575)

Biographical details
- Born: May 28, 1969 (age 57)
- Education: California State University, Northridge; California Lutheran University

Coaching career (HC unless noted)
- 1992–1993: Royal HS (JV)
- 1993–2001: Cal Lutheran
- 2001–2011: Cal State Bakersfield
- 2011–2013: San Jose State
- 2014–present: Dominican (CA)

Head coaching record
- Overall: 466–269 (.634)
- Tournaments: 1–2 (NCAA D-I Ind.); 6–5 (NCAA D-II); 1–4 (NCAA D-III); 3–2 (WBI)

Timothy Brian LaKose (born May 28, 1969) is an American college basketball coach who is currently head women's basketball coach at the Dominican University of California.

== Early life and education ==
LaKose attended Northview High School in Covina, California, where he was a two-time honorable mention Los Angeles Times basketball all-star, as a junior in 1986 and senior in 1987. LaKose then attended California State University, Northridge and graduated with a bachelor's degree in kinesiology in 1991.

== Coaching career ==
LaKose was assistant athletic trainer for California Lutheran University women's basketball. In the 1992–93 season, LaKose was junior varsity coach at Royal High School in Simi Valley, California. In July 1993, LaKose returned to Cal Lutheran to become women's basketball head coach. In eight seasons, LaKose had a 136–67 record with Cal Lutheran and led the Regals to five SCIAC titles and four NCAA Division III Tournaments.

LaKose then was head coach at Cal State Bakersfield from 2001 to 2011. During this time, Cal State Bakersfield moved up from Division II to Division I. He finished his tenure with a 211–87 record.

From 2011 to 2013, LaKose was head coach at San Jose State. In 2012, LaKose earned WAC Coach of the Year honors for turning around a program that had only 13 wins in the four years prior to an 11–19 record in the 2011–12 season. San Jose State posted another 11–19 record the following season but improved to 8–10 in WAC play. Citing personal reasons, LaKose suddenly resigned on August 30, 2013, just over a week into the 2013 fall semester. However, in 2016, the NCAA revealed that LaKose violated NCAA rules by conducting impermissible practices and allowed an academic non-qualifier to participate in practices.

In 2014, LaKose returned to coaching at the Dominican University of California, a Division II school in San Rafael. Dominican improved from 9–18 the previous season to 13–13 in LaKose's first season.

LaKose joined the Nicasio School District as a part-time physical education teacher in 2016.

== Head coaching record ==
Record table
Season	Team	Overall	Conference	Standing	Postseason
Cal Lutheran Regals (Southern California Intercollegiate Athletic Conference) (1993–2001)
1993–94	Cal Lutheran	8–15	4–8	6th	
1994–95	Cal Lutheran	23–3	11–1	1st	NCAA Division III First Round
1995–96	Cal Lutheran	13–3	9–3	T–1st	
1996–97	Cal Lutheran	15–10	7–5	4th	
1997–98	Cal Lutheran	17–8	11–1	1st	NCAA Division III First Round
1998–99	Cal Lutheran	22–5	10–2	T–1st	NCAA Division III First Round
1999–2000	Cal Lutheran	19–7	11–1	1st	NCAA Division III Second Round
2000–01	Cal Lutheran	19–6	8–4	3rd	
Cal Lutheran:		136–67 (.670)	71–25 (.740)		
Cal State Bakersfield Roadrunners (California Collegiate Athletic Association) (2001–2006)
2001–02	Cal State Bakersfield	23–6	18–4	2nd	NCAA Division II Second Round
2002–03	Cal State Bakersfield	29–2	21–1	1st	NCAA Division II Elite Eight
2003–04	Cal State Bakersfield	23–6	18–4	1st	NCAA Division II Second Round
2004–05	Cal State Bakersfield	20–8	14–6	4th	NCAA Division II First Round
2005–06	Cal State Bakersfield	24–5	16–4	3rd	NCAA Division II Second Round
Cal State Bakersfield Roadrunners (NCAA Division I independent) (2006–2011)
2006–07	Cal State Bakersfield	23–6			
2007–08	Cal State Bakersfield	12–17			NCAA Division I Ind. Runner-Up
2008–09	Cal State Bakersfield	19–10			
2009–10	Cal State Bakersfield	16–13			WBI first round
2010–11	Cal State Bakersfield	22–12			WBI Runner-Up
Cal State Bakersfield:		211–85 (.713)	87–19 (.821)		
San Jose State Spartans (Western Athletic Conference) (2011–2013)
2011–12	San Jose State	11–19	6–8	T–4th	
2012–13	San Jose State	11–19	8–10	T–6th	
San Jose State:		22–38 (.367)	14–18 (.438)		
Dominican Penguins (Pacific West Conference) (2014–present)
2014–15	Dominican (CA)	13–13	10–10	7th	
2015–16	Dominican (CA)	18–11	13–7	5th	
2016–17	Dominican (CA)	16–12	12–8	T–6th	
2017–18	Dominican (CA)	18–12	11–9	T–6th	
2018–19	Dominican (CA)	21–7	18–4	T–2nd	NCAA Division II first round
2019–20	Dominican (CA)	10–18	7–15	T–9th	
2020–21	Dominican (CA)	1–6	1–6	3rd (Northern California)	
2021–22	Dominican (CA)	18–10	15–5	2nd	
2022–23	Dominican (CA)	18–11	15–5	2nd	
Dominican (CA):		123–100 (.552)	102–69 (.596)		
Total:		466–269 (.634)			
National champion Postseason invitational champion Conference regular season champion Conference regular season and conference tournament champion Division regular season champion Division regular season and conference tournament champion Conference tournament champion
