= Jim Bolla =

American college basketball coach (1952–2022)

Biographical details
- Born: March 27, 1952; Pittsburgh, Pennsylvania, U.S.
- Died: October 21, 2022 (aged 70)

Playing career
- 1971–1975: Pittsburgh
- Position: Center

Coaching career (HC unless noted)
- 1975–1977: Pittsburgh (men's volunteer asst.)
- 1977–1978: Pittsburgh (men's grad. asst.)
- 1978–1979: Pittsburgh (men's asst.)
- 1979–1980: Pittsburgh (women's asst.)
- 1981–1982: UNLV (assistant)
- 1982–1996: UNLV
- 2004–2009: Hawaii

Administrative career (AD unless noted)
- 1996–2001: UNLV (dir. of development)

Head coaching record
- Overall: 364–200
- Tournaments: 3–7 (NCAA); 3–3 (NWIT)

Accomplishments and honors

Championships
- 4× PCAA/Big West regular season (1984, 1985, 1990, 1991); 5× PCAA/Big West tournament (1984–1986, 1990, 1994)

James Daniel Bolla Jr. (March 27, 1952 – October 21, 2022) was an American college basketball coach. He was the head women's basketball coach at the University of Nevada, Las Vegas from 1982 to 1996, with his 300 games won the most in the team's history.

== Early life and education ==
Born in Pittsburgh, Bolla graduated from Bishop Canevin High School in 1970. He played college basketball at the University of Pittsburgh from 1971 to 1975 and was the starting center from 1973 to 1975. The 1974 team was ranked at 10th in the nation, and featured a school record 22-game winning streak. The Panthers advanced to the Elite Eight of the 1974 NCAA tournament. Bolla graduated in August 1976 with a degree in physical education.

== Coaching career ==
From 1975 to 1977, Bolla was a volunteer assistant coach for Pittsburgh men's basketball. He was promoted to graduate assistant in 1977 and full assistant in 1978. In the 1979–80 season, Bolla moved to the Pittsburgh women's basketball program to be an assistant coach.

Bolla joined UNLV in 1981 as an assistant coach, then was head coach from 1982 to 1996. In those 14 years, Bolla had a 300–120 (.714) record, including seven NCAA tournament appearances and 11 seasons with 20 or more wins. His 300 wins with the team were the most by a UNLV women's basketball coach at the time of his death, while his 71.4 winning percentage was second to Dan Ayala. During the 1989–90 season, UNLV moved to second in the nation, the highest ranking in school history. That team finished with a 28–3 record, the best mark in school history. He is a three-time Big West coach of the year award winner, because of his work at UNLV. He coached six all-Americans, three Big West player of the year winners, and 24 all-conference selections. UNLV won seven Big West titles under his leadership.

From 2004 to 2009, Bolla was head coach at Hawaii before being fired for cause on April 6, 2009. Bolla was later cleared of the accusation as a practice incident of coaching that was misinterpreted by the player. The firing followed unfound accusations of verbal and physical abuse from a few players who merely wanted a new coach over playing time.

== Career outside coaching ==
In the 1980–81 season, Bolla was a photographer for the Eastern Eight (now Atlantic 10) Conference.

From 1996 to 2001, Bolla was director of athletic development at UNLV. In that position, he was in charge of fundraising for the athletic department. Bolla secured a $3.1 million gift for the softball and golf programs among nearly $5 million he helped raise. Bolla went into private business after UNLV declined to renew his contract.

In 2015, Bolla began co-hosting a daily sports talk show on KDWN radio in Las Vegas, Coaches' Corner with his friend, longtime NVHOF Las Vegas sportscaster Rich Perez, and later with former Raider Greg Townsend.

== Personal life ==
Bolla was married to Dallas Boychuk. They later divorced just prior to his death. Together, they had one daughter, Sasha. Previously, Bolla was married to Sheila Strike, who was co-head coach with him at UNLV. He resided in Las Vegas during his later years.

Bolla was diagnosed with cancer in August 2017. He died on the evening of October 21, 2022, at the age of 70.

== Head coaching record ==
Record table
Season	Team	Overall	Conference	Standing	Postseason
UNLV Lady Rebels (NCAA Division I independent) (1982–1983)
1982–83	UNLV	24–4			
UNLV Lady Rebels (Pacific Coast Athletic Association/Big West Conference) (1983–1996)
1983–84	UNLV	24–7	4–0	1st	NCAA First Round
1984–85	UNLV	26–5	8–0	1st	NCAA First Round
1985–86	UNLV	22–9	11–3	2nd	NCAA First Round
1986–87	UNLV	21–9	13–5	T–2nd	
1987–88	UNLV	25–9	14–4	2nd	NWIT Third Place
1988–89	UNLV	27–7	13–5	T–2nd	NCAA Sweet 16
1989–90	UNLV	28–3	17–1	1st	NCAA First Round
1990–91	UNLV	25–7	15–3	T–1st	NCAA Second Round
1991–92	UNLV	16–10	13–5	T–2nd	
1992–93	UNLV	24–7	15–3	2nd	NWIT Consolation
1993–94	UNLV	23–7	14–4	T–2nd	NCAA First Round
1994–95	UNLV	11–15	10–8	T–5th	
1995–96	UNLV	4–21	3–15	T–9th	
UNLV:		300–120 (.714)	100–56 (.641)		
Hawaii Rainbow Wahine (Western Athletic Conference) (2004–2009)
2004–05	Hawaii	11–15	7–11	7th	
2005–06	Hawaii	18–10	9–7	3rd	
2006–07	Hawaii	15–14	9–7	T–4th	
2007–08	Hawaii	12–18	6–10	6th	
2008–09	Hawaii	8–23	4–12	8th	
Hawaii:		64–80 (.444)	35–47 (.427)		
Total:		364–200 (.645)			
National champion Postseason invitational champion Conference regular season champion Conference regular season and conference tournament champion Division regular season champion Division regular season and conference tournament champion Conference tournament champion
