= 2013–14 Cal State Northridge Matadors women's basketball team =

Intercollegiate basketball season

2013–14 Cal State Northridge Matadors women's basketball
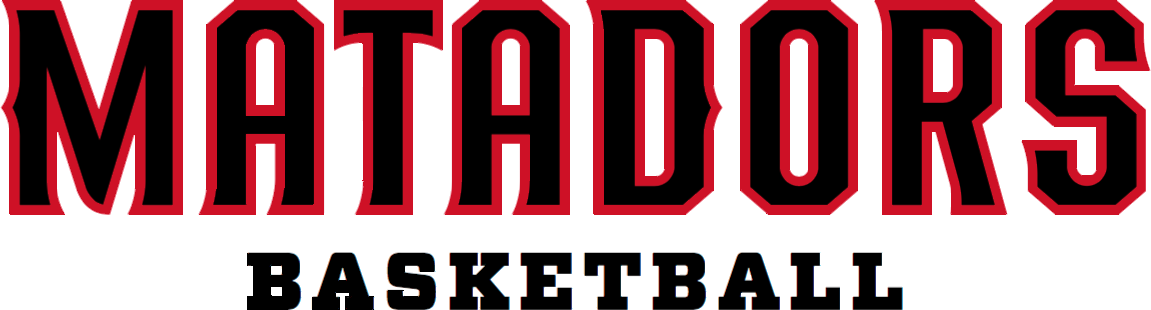

2014 Big West Champions
- Conference: Big West Conference
- Record: 18–14 (12–4 Big West)
- Head coach: Jason Flowers (4th season)
- Assistant coaches: Lindsey Foster; Mario Trutanic; Christine Collins-Kiernan
- Home arena: Matadome

2013–14 Big West women's basketball standings
	Conf.				Overall
Team	W		L	PCT	W		L	PCT
Cal State Northridge†	12	–	4	.750	18	–	15	.545
Cal Poly	11	–	5	.688	18	–	14	.563
Hawaii	10	–	6	.625	17	–	14	.548
UC Irvine	9	–	7	.563	17	–	15	.531
UC Davis	9	–	7	.563	15	–	16	.484
Long Beach State	8	–	8	.500	17	–	15	.531
Cal State Fullerton	8	–	8	.500	12	–	18	.400
UC Santa Barbara	3	–	13	.188	8	–	22	.267
UC Riverside	2	–	14	.125	6	–	23	.207
† 2014 Big West tournament winner As of 10:03, 1 April 2014 (UTC); Rankings from AP poll

The 2013–14 Cal State Northridge Matadors women's basketball team represented California State University, Northridge during the 2013–14 NCAA Division I women's basketball season. The Matadors, led by fourth year head coach Jason Flowers, played their home games at the Matadome as members of the Big West Conference.

== Roster ==
2013–14 Cal State Northridge Matadors women's basketball team
Players
Coaches

Pos.	#	Name	Height	Year	Previous school	Hometown
G	0	Breeyon Alexander	5 ft 10 in (1.78 m)	So	Long Beach Poly	Long Beach, CA
G	2	Haley White	5 ft 9 in (1.75 m)	Sr	Colony	Ontario, CA
G	3	Janae Sharp	5 ft 7 in (1.7 m)	RS Jr	Rialto	Rialto, CA
C	4	Camille Mahlknecht	6 ft 2 in (1.88 m)	Jr	Agoura	Agoura, CA
G	5	Ashlee Guay	5 ft 7 in (1.7 m)	Jr	Academy of Our Lady of Peace	San Diego, CA
G	11	Cinnamon Lister	5 ft 5 in (1.65 m)	RS Jr	Santiago	Corona, CA
G	14	Emily Cole	5 ft 11 in (1.8 m)	Fr	West Hills	Santee, CA
F	21	Travis Newman	6 ft 0 in (1.83 m)	Jr	Chaminade	Simi Valley, CA
G	22	Randi Friess	6 ft 0 in (1.83 m)	Jr	Savannah Christian	Savannah, GA
F	23	Destini Price	6 ft 0 in (1.83 m)	So	Antelope Valley	Lancaster, CA
F	33	Mikayla Thielges	6 ft 2 in (1.88 m)	Sr	Silverado	Las Vegas, NV
F	35	Jasmine Johnson	6 ft 0 in (1.83 m)	So	Canyon Springs	Moreno Valley, CA
C	53	Bernadette Fong	6 ft 3 in (1.91 m)	So	Liberty	Brentwood, CA
G	55	Katelin King	5 ft 9 in (1.75 m)	Fr	River City	West Sacramento, CA

Head coach

- Jason Flowers (UCLA)

Assistant coach(es)

- Lindsey Foster (Northern Arizona)
- Mario Trutanic (Antioch)
- Christine Collins-Kiernan (Cal State Fullerton)

Legend

- (C) Team captain
- (S) Suspended
- (I) Ineligible
- (W) Walk-on
- Injured
- Current redshirt

== Schedule and results ==
Date time, TV	Rank^{#}	Opponent^{#}	Result	Record	Site (attendance) city, state
Exhibition
11/01/2013*; 5:00 pm		Cal State San marcos	W 83–41	–	Matadome (N/A); Northridge, CA
Regular season
11/08/2013*; 5:05 pm		at Sacramento State	L 73–92	0–1	Colberg Court (468); Sacramento, CA
11/10/2013*; 1:05 pm		at Montana State	L 69–85	0–2	Worthington Arena (1,127); Bozeman, MT
11/17/2013*; 1:00 pm		at Clemson	W 69–53	1–2	Littlejohn Coliseum (407); Clemson, SC
11/19/2013*; 7:00 pm		at Georgia Southern	W 70–58	2–2	Hanner Fieldhouse (326); Statesboro, GA
11/23/2013*; 4:00 pm		BYU	L 66–82	2–3	Matadome (320); Northridge, CA
11/29/2013*; 7:30 pm		Santa Clara; Radisson Hotel Chatsworth Thanksgiving Basketball Classic	L 61–66	2–4	Matadome (359); Northridge, CA
11/30/2013*; 5:00 pm		Utah State; Radisson Hotel Chatsworth Thanksgiving Basketball Classic	L 67–75	2–5	Matadome (254); Northridge, CA
12/04/2013*; 7:00 pm		at Washington State	L 59–68	2–6	Beasley Coliseum (612); Pullman, WA
12/06/2013*; 6:00 pm		at Eastern Washington	L 53–73	2–7	Reese Court (628); Cheney, WA
12/10/2013*; 6:00 pm		Seattle	W 65–64	3–7	Matadome (406); Northridge, CA
12/19/2013; 7:00 pm		at Northern Arizona	W 64–52	4–7	Matadome (226); Northridge, CA
12/21/2013*; 4:00 pm		Saint Mary's	L 60–72	4–8	Matadome (213); Northridge, CA
12/29/2013*; 4:05 pm		at Oregon	L 61–96	4–9	Matthew Knight Arena (1,121); Eugene, OR
01/02/2014*; 7:00 pm		Cal State Bakersfield	L 73–74 ^{OT}	4–10	Matadome (347); Northridge, CA
01/09/2014; 7:00 pm		at UC Davis	W 56–52	5–10 (1–0)	The Pavilion (483); Davis, CA
01/12/2014; 5:05 pm, OC Sports		at Hawaiʻi	L 44–54	5–11 (1–1)	Stan Sheriff Center (1,750); Honolulu, HI
01/16/2014; 7:00 pm		Cal Poly	W 81–76	6–11 (2–1)	Matadome (268); Northridge, CA
01/18/2014; 2:00 pm		at UC Santa Barbara	W 64–46	7–11 (3–1)	UC Santa Barbara Events Center (349); Santa Barbara, CA
01/23/2014; 7:00 pm		UC Irvine	L 73–83	7–12 (3–2)	Matadome (346); Northridge, CA
01/25/2014; 4:00 pm		Long Beach State	W 77–54	8–12 (4–2)	Matadome (264); Northridge, CA
01/30/2014; 7:00 pm		at UC Riverside	W 71–61	9–12 (5–2)	UC Riverside Student Recreation Center (384); Riverside, CA
02/01/2014; 4:00 pm		Hawaiʻi	W 75–72 ^{OT}	10–12 (6–2)	Matadome (321); Northridge, CA
02/06/2014; 7:00 pm		UC Davis	L 74–82	10–13 (6–3)	Matadome (318); Northridge, CA
02/08/2014; 6:00 pm		at Cal State Fullerton	W 76–54	11–13 (7–3)	Titan Gym (257); Fullerton, CA
02/13/2014; 7:05 pm		at Cal Poly	W 83–57	12–13 (8–3)	Mott Gym (454); San Luis Obispo, CA
02/15/2014; 4:00 pm		UC Santa Barbara	W 78–54	13–13 (9–3)	Matadome (392); Northridge, CA
02/22/2014; 4:00 pm, ESPN3		at UC Irvine	L 72–76	13–14 (9–4)	Bren Events Center (289); Irvine, CA
02/27/2014; 7:00 pm		Cal State Fullerton	W 79–59	14–14 (10–4)	Matadome (467); Northridge, CA
03/01/2014; 4:00 pm		UC Riverside	W 77–75	15–14 (11–4)	Matadome (423); Northridge, CA
03/06/2014; 7:00 pm		at Long Beach State	W 52–49	16–14 (12–4)	Walter Pyramid (739); Long Beach, CA
Big West tournament
03/14/2014; 12:00 pm, ESPN3	(1)	vs. (4) UC Irvine; Semifinals	W 78–60	17–14	Honda Center (N/A); Anaheim, CA
03/15/2014; 1:00 pm, FS PRIME	(1)	vs. (2) Cal Poly; Championship	W 73–58	18–14	Honda Center (1,321); Anaheim, CA
NCAA tournament
03/23/2014*; 2:30 pm, ESPN2	(16)	vs. (1) No. 8 South Carolina; First Round	L 58–73	18–15	Alaska Airlines Arena (1,365); Seattle, WA
*Non-conference game. ^{#}Rankings from AP Poll. (#) Tournament seedings in parentheses. All times are in Pacific Time.
