= 1981 AIAW National Division I Basketball Championship =

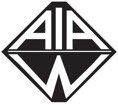

Tournament information
- Dates: March 18, 1981–March 29, 1981
- Administrator: Association for Intercollegiate Athletics for Women
- Host(s): University of Oregon
- Venue(s): Eugene, Oregon
- Participants: 24

Final positions
- Champions: Louisiana Tech
- Runner-up: Tennessee

Tournament statistics
- Matches played: 23

The 1981 AIAW National Division I Basketball Championship was held on March 18–29, 1981. Twenty-four teams were invited, with eight teams receiving first round byes. First round games were played at on-campus locations. Louisiana Tech University was crowned national champion at the conclusion of the tournament. Louisiana Tech finished undefeated (34–0), becoming the third undefeated national champion.

The host site for the Final Four was Eugene, Oregon, and the championship game was again broadcast live on NBC.

This was the first year that the National Association of Intercollegiate Athletics sponsored a competing women's basketball championship for its collegiate members and the last year before the NCAA began sponsoring tournaments for its three divisions and their members.

== Opening rounds ==
=== Central Regional ===
First Round; March 18/19, 1981
Jackson State	68
Minnesota	65
UCLA	72
Oregon State	65

Second Round; March 21, 1981
Jackson State	50
Louisiana Tech	97
Kansas	71
UCLA	73

Quarterfinals; March 24, 1981
Louisiana Tech	87
UCLA	54

=== West Regional ===
First Round; March 18/19, 1981
Oregon	75
Colorado	74
North Carolina State	95
Georgia State	86

Second Round; March 21, 1981
Oregon	64
Southern California	67
Cheyney State	88
North Carolina State	72

Quarterfinals; March 24, 1981
Southern California	67
Cheyney State	58

=== South Regional ===
First Round; March 18/19, 1981
Illinois State	66
Texas	63
Kentucky	81
Syracuse	80

Second Round; March 21, 1981
Illinois State	63
Tennessee	78
Maryland	83
Kentucky	82

Quarterfinals; March 24, 1981
Tennessee	79
Maryland	67

=== East Regional ===
First Round; March 18/19, 1981
Stephen F. Austin	88
Northwestern	67
Rutgers	99
Clemson	76

Second Round; March 21, 1981
Stephen F. Austin	54
Old Dominion	60
Long Beach State	77
Rutgers	73

Quarterfinals; March 24, 1981
Old Dominion	76
Long Beach State	60

=== Final Four – Eugene, OR ===
Semifinals; March 27, 1981
Louisiana Tech	66
Southern California	50
Tennessee	68
Old Dominion	65

Final; March 29, 1981
Louisiana Tech	79
Tennessee	59
Third place
Southern California	65
Old Dominion	68

== See also ==
- 1981 AIAW National Division II Basketball Championship
- 1981 AIAW National Division III Basketball Championship
- 1981 NAIA women's basketball tournament
