= San Jose State Spartans women's basketball =

Women's basketball team of San Jose State University, California

San Jose State Spartans
| 2026–27 San Jose State Spartans women's basketball team |
- University: San Jose State University
- First season: 1895–96
- Head coach: Jonas Chatterton (3rd season)
- Location: San Jose, California
- Arena: Provident Credit Union Event Center (capacity: 5,000)
- Conference: Mountain West
- Nickname: Spartans
- Colors: Gold, white, and blue

Conference regular-season champions
- 1978, 1979

Uniforms
| Home | Away |

The San Jose State Spartans women's basketball is the team that represents San José State University in NCAA Division I college basketball as they are a member of the Mountain West Conference currently.

== History ==
The women's basketball program at San Jose State University, then San Jose Normal School, began in 1895. By 1968, San Jose State College established its first intercollegiate-sponsored women's basketball team that became formally established in the 1971–72 season with the Association of Intercollegiate Athletics for Women.

Carolyn Lewis became head coach at San Jose State in 1974. In 1975, the women's basketball program offered its first scholarship.

Sharon Chatman succeeded Lewis as head coach in 1976, the year the team joined the NorCal Conference. In Chatman's 10 seasons as head coach, she compiled a 143–121 record and led the Spartans to NorCal championships in 1978 and 1979 and the AIAW women's basketball tournament every year from 1978 to 1981. In 1982, San Jose State women's athletics programs moved from the AIAW to the National Collegiate Athletic Association (NCAA), and the women's basketball team moved from the NorCal Conference to the NorPac Conference.

Chatman posted losing records during each of her final three seasons (1983–1986), and the team continued to post losing records throughout the six-season tenure of Tina Krah from 1986 to 1992 and coach Karen Smith's first season in 1992–93. Krah was 17–143 as head coach. San Jose State women's basketball joined the men's basketball program in the Pacific Coast Athletic Association (now the Big West Conference) in 1986, Krah's first season. In 1993–94, Karen Smith led the Spartans to their first winning season since 1982–83. This would be the only winning season in Karen Smith's tenure, during which San Jose State moved from the Big West to the Western Athletic Conference in 1996.

Janice Richard replaced Smith in 1999, and the Spartans' next winning season would be in 2001–02 with a 17–11 record. Richard also led the Spartans to two straight winning seasons in 2004 and 2005. Lamisha Augustine became the first San Jose State women's basketball player drafted to the WNBA in April 2006, when the Sacramento Monarchs selected Augustine in the third round of the 2006 WNBA draft. In August 2006, Richard took a medical leave of absence to seek treatment for breast cancer.

Assistant coaches Greg Lockridge and Derrick Allen served as interim head coaches for the 2006–07 season, a season in which the Spartans fell from 13–15 the previous season to 5–27. Lockridge was head coach for the first six games (posting an 0–6 record), and Allen took over for the last 21 games (going 5–21). The university placed Lockridge on paid administrative leave on November 30, 2006, a week after a San Jose Mercury News report that leading scorer Amber Jackson transferred after "difficulty in dealing with" Lockridge.

In April 2007, San Jose State hired former Lynn University head coach Pam DeCosta as the Spartans' head coach. DeCosta served as head coach for four seasons, during which she posted a 13–106 record.

Tim La Kose became the women's basketball head coach in April 2011 after ten seasons as head coach at Cal State Bakersfield. Under La Kose, the Spartans improved to 11–19 in 2011–12, following a 2–27 season. The Spartans had another 11–19 season in 2012–13, their final season in the WAC. San Jose State athletics programs joined the Mountain West Conference on July 1, 2013.

On August 30, 2013, during the first week of the fall semester, La Kose resigned, citing personal reasons. Athletic director Gene Bleymaier hired Sacramento State head coach Jamie Craighead on September 16, to replace La Kose. San Jose State had its third straight 11–19 (5–13 MWC) season under Craighead in 2013–14. In Craighead's second season, the team improved to 15–17 (7–11 MWC). Entering the Mountain West Conference women's basketball tournament as the #8 seed, San Jose State made the semifinals by upsetting #1 Colorado State in the second round. This marked the first time in tournament history the #8 seed beat the #1 seed. On January 21, 2015, Ta'rea Cunnigan broke the San Jose State career scoring record previously set by Ricky Berry (1,768 in 1988). Cunnigan ended her career with 2,062 points.

== All-time record vs. current Mountain West teams ==
As of the conclusion of the 2023–24 NCAA Division I women's basketball season:

| Opponent | Won | Lost | Percentage | Streak | First Meeting |
|---|---|---|---|---|---|
| Air Force | 14 | 11 | .560 | L2 | 1997 |
| Boise State | 14 | 29 | .326 | L4 | 1994 |
| Colorado State | 7 | 21 | .250 | W1 | 1984 |
| Fresno State | 24 | 64 | .273 | L2 | 1974 |
| Nevada | 31 | 34 | .477 | W1 | 1976 |
| New Mexico | 4 | 17 | .190 | L5 | 1999 |
| San Diego State | 10 | 29 | .256 | L6 | 1977 |
| UNLV | 9 | 41 | .180 | L7 | 1978 |
| Utah State | 17 | 20 | .459 | L1 | 1980 |
| Wyoming | 3 | 18 | .143 | L13 | 1997 |
| Totals | 132 | 281 | .320 | | |

== Head coaches ==
As of the conclusion of the 2025–26 NCAA Division I women's basketball season:

| Coach | Seasons | Years | Record | Win PCT |
|---|---|---|---|---|
| Carolyn Lewis | 2 | 1975–1976 | 8–15 | .348 |
| Sharon Chatman | 10 | 1977–1986 | 143–121 | .542 |
| Tina Krah | 6 | 1987–1992 | 17–146 | .104 |
| Karen Smith | 7 | 1993–1999 | 49–141 | .216 |
| Janice Richard | 7 | 1999–2006 | 93–106 | .467 |
| Greg Lockridge | * | 2006–2007 | 0–6 | .000 |
| Derrick Allen | 1* | 2006–2007 | 5–21 | .192 |
| Pam DeCosta | 4 | 2008–2011 | 13–106 | .109 |
| Tim La Kose | 2 | 2012–2013 | 22–38 | .367 |
| Jamie Craighead | 9 | 2014–2022 | 89–160 | .357 |
| April Phillips | 3 | 2022–2025 | 23–71 | .245 |
| Jonas Chatterton | 1 | 2025–present | 4-28 | .125 |
| Totals | 50 | | 465-954 | .328 |

*Greg Lockridge was an interim coach (0–6) during part of the 2006–07 season, Derrick Allen was the interim coach (5–21) for the remainder of the 2006–07 season.

== Conference affiliations ==
- AIAW Independent (1974–1976)
- Northern California Athletic Conference (1976–1982)
- NorPac Conference (1982–1986)
- Pacific Coast Athletic Association/Big West Conference (1986–1996)
- Western Athletic Conference (1996–2013)
- Mountain West Conference (2013–present)
