= UC Davis Aggies women's basketball =

2026–27 UC Davis Aggies women's basketball team
- University: University of California, Davis
- Head coach: Jennifer Gross (16th season)
- Location: Davis, California
- Arena: University Credit Union Center (capacity: 5,931)
- Conference: Mountain West
- Nickname: Aggies
- Colors: Yale blue and gold

NCAA Division I tournament Elite Eight
- 1997*
Other NCAA Division I tournament results
Sweet Sixteen	1991*, 1992*, 1995*, 1996*, 1997*, 1998*, 1999*
Appearances	1986*, 1988*, 1990*, 1991*, 1992*, 1993*, 1994*, 1995*, 1996*, 1997*, 1998*, 1999*, 2011, 2019, 2021

AIAW tournament quarterfinals
- Division III: 1981
Other AIAW tournament results
Appearances	Division III: 1981

Conference tournament champions
- Big West: 2011, 2019, 2021

Conference regular-season champions
- Golden State: 1978, 1980 NCAC: 1986, 1988, 1991, 1992, 1993, 1995, 1996, 1997, 1998 CCCA: 1999 Big West: 2010, 2017, 2018, 2019, 2020, 2021
- * at Division II level

The UC Davis Aggies Women's Basketball team is representing the University of California, Davis in Davis, California, United States. The school's team currently competes in the Mountain West Conference (MW).

== History ==
UC Davis formerly was part of NCAA Division II. In the Golden State Conference, they won the regular season title twice in 1978 and 1980. They later joined the Northern California Athletic Conference and played there for the next decade before joining the California Collegiate Athletic Association in the late 1990s.

After taking part in an NCAA Division II program, the UC Davis women's basketball team transitioned to the NCAA Division I level in 2003–04, officially competing as a member of the Big West Conference in 2007–08.

Entering the 2020–21 season, the Aggies have won five Big West Conference regular season titles (2009–10, 2016–17, 2017–18, 2018–19, 2019–20) and two Big West Tournament titles (2011, 2019) in their combined 13 Division I seasons. UC Davis is one of the three schools in league history to win at least four consecutive Big West regular season titles, joining UC Santa Barbara (1996–2005) and Long Beach State (1985–1989).

The Aggies have twice advanced to the NCAA Tournament (2011, 2019) as the automatic qualifier out of the Big West Conference. They have earned five berths to the WNIT, including an Elite Eight appearance in 2018 and a Sweet Sixteen appearance in 2017.

As of 2020, UC Davis has posted a 248–160 (.608) overall record as a Division I program, including a 135–69 (.662) record in Big West Conference play.

=== National Affiliations ===
- AIAW Division III: 1971–72 to 1980–81
- NCAA Division II: 1981–82 to 2002–03
- NCAA Division I: 2003–04 to present (provisional from 2003 to 2007)

=== Conference affiliations ===
- Golden State Conference: 1977–78 to 1981–82
- Northern California Athletic Conference: 1982–83 to 1997–98
- California Collegiate Athletic Association: 1998–99 to 2003–04
- Independent: 2004–05 to 2006–07
- Big West Conference: 2007–08 to present

== Season records ==
Season	Record	Conference record	Place	Coach	Postseason
1971–72	14–3	—	—	Deanna Sciaraffa	NCAIC Champions
1972—73	—	—	—	—	—
1973–74	—	—	—	—	—
1974–75	9–7	—	—	Pam Gill	—
1975–76	13–7	—	—	Pam Gill	—
1976–77	5–11	—	—	Pam Gill	—
1977–78	15–8	12–2	1st	Pam Gill	—
1978–79	17–8	10–4	3rd	Pam Gill	—
1979–80	20–9	10–2	T-1st	Royal Morrison	—
1980–81	23–8	11–3	2nd	Pam Gill	AIAW Division III Quarterfinals
1981–82	11–16	7–7	4th	Pam Gill	—
1982–83	14–12	9–5	3rd	Pam Gill	—
1983–84	15–12	11–3	2nd	Pam Gill	NCAC Shaughnessy First Round
1984–85	7–19	6–8	3rd	Pam Gill	NCAC Shaughnessy First Round
1985–86	17–10	10–2	1st	Pam Gill	NCAA Division II West Region First Round
1986–87	16–12	8–4	T-2nd	Ellen O'Connor	NCAC Shaughnessy Final
1987–88	18–11	10–2	T-1st	Pam Gill-Fisher	NCAA Division II West Region First Round
1988–89	20–6	12–2	2nd	Jorja Hoehn	NCAC Shaughnessy First Round
1989–90	20–8	11–3	2nd	Jorja Hoehn	NCAA Division II West Region First Round
1990–91	26–5	13–1	T-1st	Jorja Hoehn	NCAA Division II West Region Final
1991–92	25–3	11–1	1st	Jorja Hoehn	NCAA Division II West Region Final
1992–93	19–7	9–3	T-1st	Jorja Hoehn	NCAA Division II West Region First Round
1993–94	22–7	9–3	2nd	Jorja Hoehn	NCAA Division II West Region Second Round
1994–95	25–4	11–1	1st	Jorja Hoehn	NCAA Division II West Region Final
1995–96	25–4	14–0	1st	Jorja Hoehn	NCAA Division II West Region Final
1996–97	29–3	14–0	1st	Sandy Simpson	NCAA Division II Elite Eight
1997–98	23–7	12–2	T-1st	Jorja Hoehn	NCAA Division II West Region Final
1998–99	25–4	18–2	1st	Sandy Simpson	NCAA Division II West Region Final
1999–00	17–8	14–6	2nd	Sandy Simpson	—
2000–01	16–11	12–10	T-6th	Sandy Simpson	—
2001–02	18–9	14–8	4th	Sandy Simpson	—
2002–03	17–10	13–9	4th	Sandy Simpson	—
2003–04	16–12	11–11	T-6th	Sandy Simpson	—
2004–05	9–18	—	—	Sandy Simpson	—
2005–06	16–12	—	—	Sandy Simpson	—
2006–07	13–16	—	—	Sandy Simpson	—
2007–08	19–12	9–3	2nd	Sandy Simpson	WNIT First Round
2008–09	11–18	7–9	5th	Sandy Simpson	Big West Tournament First Round
2009–10	21–11	11–3	1st	Sandy Simpson	WNIT First Round
2010–11	24–9	10–6	4th	Sandy Simpson	Big West Tournament Champions; NCAA Tournament – First Round
2011–12	17–13	9–7	4th	Jennifer Gross	Big West Tournament First Round; WNIT First Round
2012–13	12–18	7–11	7th	Jennifer Gross	Big West Tournament First Round
2013–14	15–16	9–7	T-4th	Jennifer Gross	Big West Tournament Quarterfinals
2014–15	15–16	8–8	T-5th	Jennifer Gross	Big West Tournament Semifinals
2015–16	19–13	10–6	4th	Jennifer Gross	Big West Tournament Championship Game
2016–17	25–8	14–2	1st	Jennifer Gross	Big West Tournament Semifinals; WNIT Sweet Sixteen
2017–18	28–7	14–2	1st	Jennifer Gross	Big West Tournament Championship Game; WNIT Elite Eight
2018–19	25–7	15–1	1st	Jennifer Gross	Big West Tournament Champions; NCAA Tournament – First Round
2019–20	17–12	12–4	1st	Jennifer Gross	Cancelled due to COVID-19 pandemic
2020–21	13–3	9–1	1st	Jennifer Gross	Big West Tournament Champions; NCAA Tournament – First Round
2021–22	15–13	8–8	7th	Jennifer Gross	Big West Tournament Semifinals
2022–23	16–14	12–7	4th	Jennifer Gross	Big West Tournament Quarterfinals
2023–24	20–14	13–7	5th	Jennifer Gross	Big West Tournament Finals

== Coaches ==
All coaching records as of the 2022–23 season.

Coach	Seasons	Years	Wins	Losses	Pct.
Deanne Sciaraffa	1971–1972	1	14	3	.824
Pam Gill-Fisher	1975–1979; 1981–1986; 1987–1988	12	164	129	.560
Royal Morrison	1979–1980	1	20	9	.690
Ellen O'Connor	1986–1987	1	16	12	.571
Jorja Hoehn	1988–1997	9	205	51	.801
Sandy Simpson	1996–1997; 1998–2011	14	251	153	.621
Jennifer Gross	2011–present	12	252	162	.609

Head coach Pam Gill–Fisher was a student-athlete (basketball, softball, volleyball, tennis, and field hockey), coach, and administrator, at UC Davis. She was inducted into the Cal Aggie Athletics Hall of Fame twice, once as a student-athlete in 1984 and once as a coach and administrator in 2012. She led UC Davis women's basketball to a total of 164 wins over 12 seasons, earning Northern California Athletic Conference Coach of the Year honours in 1986. She also served as head coach for the Aggies' women's volleyball and tennis teams, including an NCAA Division II national title in tennis in 1990.

Jorja Hoehn ranks second in wins with 205 victories in nine seasons, won the WBCA 1995 Division II National Coach of the Year, and Northern California Athletic Conference Coach of the Year in 1995 and 1996. The Aggies reached the NCAA Division II West Regional Final six times and reached the NCAA Tournament in eight of her nine campaigns. She was inducted into the Cal Aggie Athletics Hall of Fame in 2005.

Sandy Simpson coached the team for 14 seasons and holds the school record for coaching victories with 251. He played for the Aggie men's team and was an assistant for the women's program before becoming the interim head coach for the 1996–97 where he was named the Northern California Athletic Conference Coach of the Year in 1997. He was the interim coach again in 1998–99, earning the California Collegiate Athletic Association Coach of the Year, and was named the permanent head coach in 1999. He was the coach during the transition to Division I and earned the Big West Conference Coach of the Year in 2008 and 2010. In 2008, he led UC Davis to a second-place finish in the standings and advanced to the Big West Tournament championship game, becoming only the second team in league history to reach the championship game and earn a postseason berth in its first year in the conference. In his final season, led fourth-seeded UC Davis to the Big West Tournament Championship over top-seeded Cal Poly in 2011 and the program's first berth in the NCAA Division I women's basketball tournament

Jennifer Gross served as an assistant and associate head coach under Sandy Simpson from 2004 until he retired in 2011. She has since won both the Big West Conference Championship and the Big West Conference Coach of the Year in five consecutive seasons from 2017 to 2021 and was a finalist for the WBCA 2018 National Coach of the Year Award. She was inducted into the Cal Aggie Athletics Hall of Fame in 2003 as a student-athlete for her four seasons with the Aggies from 1993 to 1997, setting school records for career assists (448), steals (300), and three-pointers made (163). Gross, along with her assistant coaches, Joe Teramoto, Matt Klemin, & Des Abeyta lead the program to 2 Big West Championships in 2019, and 2021. On February 8, 2025, Gross became the winningest coach in program history, when her Aggies beat CSU Fullerton. This was Gross's 252nd win, passing the previous head coach, Sandy Simpson. Gross is currently married to assistant coach, Joe Teramoto and they have 2 kids, Josh and Amelia.

== Postseason ==
=== NCAA Division I tournament results ===
UC Davis has advanced to the NCAA Division I women's basketball tournament three times, all as an automatic qualifier from the Big West Conference. The Aggies are 0–3 in NCAA Tournament play.

Season	Seed	Round	Opponent	Result	Location
2011	#16	First Round	#1 Stanford	L, 86–59	Stanford, California
2019	#15	First Round	#2 Stanford	L, 79–54	Stanford, California
2021	#12	First Round	#5 Missouri State	L, 70–51	San Antonio, Texas

=== Women's National Invitation Tournament results ===
UC Davis has made six appearances in the Women's National Invitation Tournament (WNIT). The Aggies are 5–6 all-time in the WNIT, including an Elite Eight appearance in 2018 and a "Sweet 16" appearance in 2017. The wins over Utah and Colorado State in 2017 were the program's first postseason wins as a Division I program. The five WNIT victories overall are the most of any Big West Conference school as of 2019–20, while the Elite Eight berth in 2018 marked the furthest that any Big West Conference school had advanced in that tournament under its current format that began in 1998.

Year	Round	Opponent	Result	Location
2008	First Round	Gonzaga	L, 81–60	Spokane, Washington
2010	First Round	California	L, 74–69	Berkeley, California
2012	First Round	Oregon State	L, 66–48	Corvallis, Oregon
2017	First Round; Second Round; Sweet 16	Utah; Colorado State; Washington State	W, 72–62; W, 58–57; L, 71–62	Salt Lake City, Utah; Fort Collins, Colorado; Pullman, Washington
2018	First Round; Second Round; Sweet 16; Elite Eight	Idaho; Wyoming; Kansas State; Indiana	W, 82–62; W, 74–64; W, 71–69; L, 81–66	Davis, California; Laramie, Wyoming; Manhattan, Kansas; Bloomington, Indiana
2026	First Round	Pepperdine	L, 68–71	Malibu, California

=== NCAA Division II Tournament results ===
UC Davis made 12 appearances in the NCAA Division II women's basketball tournament with a 12–12 record. The Aggies advanced to the Elite Eight of the 1997 NCAA Division II Tournament, reaching the semifinals before falling to Southern Indiana, 70–62, and finishing third nationally with a 76–61 win over Bentley in the third-place game.

Season	Round	Opponent	Result	Location
1986	First Round	Cal State Northridge	L, 68–57	Northridge, California
1988	First Round	Cal Poly Pomona	L, 88–52	Pomona, California
1990	First Round	Stanislaus State	L, 78–70	Davis, California
1991	First Round; Regional Final	Stanislaus State; Cal Poly Pomona	W, 64–45; L, 58–56	Turlock, California; Pomona, California
1992	First Round; Regional Final	Cal Poly Pomona; Portland State	W, 69–49; L, 83–56	Pomona, California; Portland, Oregon
1993	First Round	Portland State	L, 64–61	Portland, Oregon
1994	First Round; Second Round	Cal Poly Pomona; Cal State San Bernardino	W, 58–56; L, 85–62	Pomona, California; Portland, Oregon
1995	First Round; Second Round	Cal State Dominguez Hills; Portland State	W, 52–42; L, 82–71	Portland, Oregon
1996	Second Round; Regional Final	Chico State; Portland State	W, 80–52; L, 70–66	Davis, California
1997	Second Round; Regional Final; Elite Eight 1st Round; Elite Eight Semifinal; Elite Eight 3rd Place	Cal Poly Pomona; Seattle Pacific; West Texas A&M; Southern Indiana; Bentley	W, 79–52; W, 74–69; W, 73–70; L, 70–62; W, 76–61	Davis, California; Davis, California; Grand Forks, North Dakota; Grand Forks, North Dakota; Grand Forks, North Dakota
1998	First Round; Second Round; Regional Final	Cal Poly Pomona; Montana State Billings; Seattle Pacific	W, 72–61; W, 69–66; L, 91–82 (OT)	Seattle, Washington

=== AIAW Division III tournament results ===
The Aggies made one appearance in the AIAW National Division III basketball tournament, with a combined record of 0–1.

Year	Round	Opponent	Result
1981	First Round	Concordia (OR)	L, 52–68
