= Sheila Strike =

Canadian basketball player

Personal information
- Nationality: Canadian
- Born: 2 November 1954 (age 71) Vancouver, British Columbia, Canada
- Height: 6 ft 3 in (191 cm)

Sport
- Sport: Basketball

Sheila Strike (born 2 November 1954) was a Canadian women's basketball player. The 6 ft 3in tall Strike, who played centre, competed in the women's tournament at the 1976 Summer Olympics.
