= UNLV Lady Rebels basketball =

UNLV Lady Rebels
2026–27 UNLV Lady Rebels basketball team
- University: University of Nevada, Las Vegas
- Head coach: Lindy La Rocque (7th season)
- Location: Paradise, Nevada
- Arena: The Pavilion (capacity: 3,000)
- Conference: Mountain West
- Nickname: Lady Rebels
- Colors: Scarlet and gray

NCAA Division I tournament Sweet Sixteen
- 1989

NCAA Division I tournament appearances
- 1984, 1985, 1986, 1989, 1990, 1991, 1994, 2002, 2022, 2023, 2024

Conference tournament champions
- 1984, 1985, 1986, 1990, 1994, 2022, 2023, 2024

Conference regular-season champions
- 2018, 2022, 2023, 2024, 2025

Uniforms
Home	Away	Alternate

The UNLV Lady Rebels basketball team is the women's basketball team that represents the University of Nevada, Las Vegas in Paradise, Nevada. The team currently competes in the Mountain West Conference and plays at The Pavilion. Since beginning in 1974, the Lady Rebels have an all-time record of 935–572. In the 1988/89 season, UNLV had their most successful season in school history. That year, they went to their lone Sweet Sixteen and lost to the Texas Longhorns 88–77. The Lady Rebels are currently coached by Lindy La Rocque, who is in her seventh year at UNLV.

== Retired Numbers ==
UNLV has retired four jersey numbers in its history. Three held school records for the Lady Rebels, with Misty Thomas being the all-time leader in scoring (since passed) and assists. Pauline Jordan being the all-time leader in blocks and Linda Frohlich being the all-time scoring leader and rebounder. Desi - Rae Young is the latest Lady Rebel to have her jersey retired at UNLV in 23 years. Young, is one of only two Lady Rebels to score over 2,017 Points and 1,081 Rebounds in her four year's at UNLV along with Linda Frohlich.

UNLV Lady Rebels retired numbers
No.	Player	Position	Tenure	Jersey Year Retired
4	Misty Thomas	PG	1982–1986	1986
50	Pauline Jordan	C	1987–1990	1995
13	Linda Fröhlich	F	1998–2002	2003
23	Desi - Rae Young	C	2020-2024	2026

== NCAA Tournament results ==
The UNLV Lady Rebels, have been to the NCAA Tournament eleven times. Their overall combined record is 3–11.

Year	Seed	Round	Opponent	Result
1984	#7	First Round	#2 Long Beach State	L 58–78
1985	#4	First Round	#5 San Diego State	L 68–70
1986	#5	Second Round	#4 North Carolina	L 76–82
1989	#6	First Round; Second Round; Sweet Sixteen	#11 Utah #3 Colorado #2 Texas	W 67–53; W 84–74; L 77–88
1990	#4	Second Round	#5 Ole Miss	L 62–66
1991	#8	First Round; Second Round	#9 Texas Tech #1 Georgia	W 70–65; L 62–86
1994	#10	First Round	#7 Montana	L 67–77
2002	#12	First Round	#5 Minnesota	L 54–71
2022	#13	First Round	#4 Arizona	L 67–72
2023	#11	First Round	#6 Michigan	L 59–71
2024	#10	First Round	#7 Creighton	L 73–87
