= Alabama Crimson Tide women's basketball =

Alabama Crimson Tide
| 2026–27 Alabama Crimson Tide women's basketball team |
- University: University of Alabama
- Head coach: Pauline Love (1st season)
- Location: Tuscaloosa, Alabama
- Arena: Coleman Coliseum (capacity: 15,383)
- Conference: SEC
- Nickname: Crimson Tide
- Colors: Crimson and white

NCAA Division I tournament Final Four
- 1994
Other NCAA Division I tournament results
| Elite Eight | 1994 |
| Sweet Sixteen | 1984, 1994, 1995, 1996, 1997, 1998 |
| Appearances | 1984, 1988, 1992, 1993, 1994, 1995, 1996, 1997, 1998, 1999, 2021, 2023, 2024, 2025, 2026 |

Uniforms
| Home | Away |

The Alabama Crimson Tide women's basketball program represents the University of Alabama in the sport of women's basketball. The team competes in the Southeastern Conference and National Collegiate Athletic Association. They are currently coached by first-year head coach Pauline Love.

== History ==
The Crimson Tide has appeared in 14 NCAA women's basketball tournaments, including an eight-year streak of consecutive appearances in the tournament stretching from 1992 to 1999. In 14 NCAA tournament appearances, Alabama has advanced to the "Sweet Sixteen" six times and the "Elite Eight" and the "Final Four" once, in 1994.

Notable seasons include 1980–81 (21–12 record, 2nd-place finish in the SEC, a 77–71 victory over Tennessee, coached by Ann Cronic), 1983–84 (21–9 record, a 2nd-place finish in the SEC, an 85–66 victory over Tennessee, and a final AP National Ranking of No. 12, coached by Ken Weeks), 1985–86 (20–9 record, coached by 1986 SEC Coach of the Year recipient, Lois Myers), 1991–92 (a 23–7 record, SEC 3rd place, final AP National Ranking of No. 18, coached by Rick Moody), 1993–94 (a 26–7 record, 4th place SEC, Midwest Regional Tournament Champion, Final Four Participant, coached by Rick Moody), 1994–95 (a 22–9 record, final AP national ranking of No. 13, coached by Rick Moody), 1995–96 (a 24–8 record, 3rd place SEC, final national AP ranking of No. 10, coached by Rick Moody), 1996–97 (a 25–7 record, midseason No. 2 national ranking, 2nd place SEC (10–2), final AP national ranking of No. 8, coached by Rick Moody), 1997–98 (a 24–10 record, 2nd place SEC, final AP national ranking of No. 11, coached by Rick Moody).

Former NCAA All-American and WNBA player Dominique Canty played for the Crimson Tide 1995–1999. Other former Alabama players include Shalonda Enis, Niesa Johnson, Navonda Moore, and Tausha Mills.

The University of Alabama also has a Women's Wheelchair Basketball Program that began in 2003. The Crimson Tide compiled a record of 34–2 in 2009 (with both losses to men's teams) and won the national championship that year against top-ranked Illinois, then won the championship again against Illinois in 2010, against UW–Whitewater in 2011, and later won the championship in 2021. They were also the runner-up to Illinois in 2008.

== Coaches ==
| Name | Year |
|---|---|
| Stephanie Schleuder | 1974–1977 |
| Ed Nixon | 1977–1980 |
| Ann Cronic | 1980–1981 |
| Ken Weeks | 1981–1985 |
| Lois Myers | 1985–1989 |
| Rick Moody | 1989–2005 |
| Stephany Smith | 2005–2008 |
| Wendell Hudson | 2008–2013 |
| Kristy Curry | 2013–2026 |
| Pauline Love | 2026–present |

== 2026-27 Coaching Staff ==
| Name | Position | Consecutive season at Alabama in current position |
|---|---|---|
| Pauline Love | Head coach | 1st |
| Tyus Hooks | Assistant coach | 1st |

== Year-by-year results ==
Record table
| Season | Coach | Overall | Conference | Standing | Postseason |
|---|---|---|---|---|---|
Alabama Crimson Tide (Independent) (1974–1979)
| 1974–75 | Stephanie Schleuder | 13–12 | | | AIAW Championship |
| 1975–76 | Stephanie Schleuder | 13–9 | | | |
| 1976–77 | Stephanie Schleuder | 13–15 | | | NWIT |
| 1977–78 | Ed Nixon | 21–10 | | | AAIAW Championship |
| 1978–79 | Ed Nixon | 13–13 | | | AAIAW Championship |
| AIAW Total: | | 73–59 | | | |
Alabama Crimson Tide (Southeastern Conference) (1979–present)
| 1979–80 | Ed Nixon | 12–15 | 3–5 | | |
| 1980–81 | Ann Cronic | 21–12 | 4–3 | | |
| 1981–82 | Ken Weeks | 17–11 | 4–3 | | |
| 1982–83 | Ken Weeks | 16–13 | 2–6 | | |
| 1983–84 | Ken Weeks | 23–9 | 5–3 | | NCAA Sweet Sixteen |
| 1984–85 | Ken Weeks | 18–10 | 3–5 | | |
| 1985–86 | Lois Myers | 20–9 | 2–7 | | |
| 1986–87 | Lois Myers | 19–10 | 2–7 | | |
| 1987–88 | Lois Myers | 18–10 | 5–4 | | NCAA First Round |
| 1988–89 | Lois Myers | 14–15 | 1–8 | | |
| 1989–90 | Rick Moody | 16–12 | 4–5 | 7th | |
| 1990–91 | Rick Moody | 17–12 | 3–6 | 9th | |
| 1991–92 | Rick Moody | 23–7 | 7–4 | 3rd | NCAA Round of 32 |
| 1992–93 | Rick Moody | 22–9 | 6–5 | 5th | NCAA Round of 32 |
| 1993–94 | Rick Moody | 26–7 | 7–4 | 4th | NCAA Final Four |
| 1994–95 | Rick Moody | 22–9 | 7–4 | 6th | NCAA Sweet Sixteen |
| 1995–96 | Rick Moody | 24–8 | 7–4 | 4th | NCAA Sweet Sixteen |
| 1996–97 | Rick Moody | 25–7 | 10–2 | 2nd | NCAA Sweet Sixteen |
| 1997–98 | Rick Moody | 24–10 | 10–4 | 2nd | NCAA Sweet Sixteen |
| 1998–99 | Rick Moody | 20–11 | 7–7 | 5th | NCAA Round of 32 |
| 1999–2000 | Rick Moody | 15–14 | 5–9 | 8th | WNIT First Round |
| 2000–01 | Rick Moody | 19–12 | 5–9 | 8th | WNIT Second Round |
| 2001–02 | Rick Moody | 19–12 | 7–7 | 8th | WNIT Quarterfinals |
| 2002–03 | Rick Moody | 13–15 | 3–11 | 10th | |
| 2003–04 | Rick Moody | 12–16 | 4–10 | 10th | |
| 2004–05 | Rick Moody | 14–15 | 4–10 | 9th | |
| 2005–06 | Stephany Smith | 9–19 | 3–11 | 11th | |
| 2006–07 | Stephany Smith | 10–20 | 0–14 | 12th | |
| 2007–08 | Stephany Smith | 8–22 | 1–13 | 12th | |
| 2008–09 | Wendell Hudson | 13–17 | 1–13 | 12th | |
| 2009–10 | Wendell Hudson | 12–18 | 4–12 | 11th | |
| 2010–11 | Wendell Hudson | 18–15 | 5–11 | 10th | WNIT Third Round |
| 2011–12 | Wendell Hudson | 12–19 | 2–14 | 11th | |
| 2012–13 | Wendell Hudson | 13–18 | 2–14 | T-13th | |
| 2013–14 | Kristy Curry | 14–16 | 7–9 | T-6th | |
| 2014–15 | Kristy Curry | 13–19 | 2–14 | 14th | |
| 2015–16 | Kristy Curry | 15–16 | 4–12 | 12th | WNIT First Round |
| 2016–17 | Kristy Curry | 22–14 | 5–11 | T-11th | WNIT Quarterfinals |
| 2017–18 | Kristy Curry | 20–14 | 7–9 | 8th | WNIT Quarterfinals |
| 2018–19 | Kristy Curry | 14–17 | 5–11 | 11th | |
| 2019–20 | Kristy Curry | 18–12 | 8–8 | 8th | Postseason Canceled |
| 2020–21 | Kristy Curry | 17–10 | 8–8 | 7th | NCAA Round of 32 |
| 2021–22 | Kristy Curry | 20–14 | 6–10 | T–10th | WNIT Quarterfinals |
| 2022–23 | Kristy Curry | 20–11 | 9–7 | T-5th | NCAA Round of 64 |
| 2023–24 | Kristy Curry | 24–10 | 10–6 | T-4th | NCAA Round of 32 |
| 2024–25 | Kristy Curry | 24–8 | 10–6 | T-6th | NCAA Round of 32 |
| 2025–26 | Kristy Curry | 24–11 | 7–9 | T–10th | NCAA Round of 32 |
| NCAA Total: | | 829–610 | 233–374 | | |
| Total: | | 902–669 | | | |
National champion Postseason invitational champion Conference regular season champion Conference regular season and conference tournament champion Division regular season champion Division regular season and conference tournament champion Conference tournament champion

== NCAA tournament results ==
The Crimson Tide have appeared in the NCAA Division I women's basketball tournament fifteen times. Their record is 20–14.

| Year | Seed | Round | Opponent | Result |
|---|---|---|---|---|
| 1984 | #2 | First Round; Sweet Sixteen | #7 Central Michigan #3 Tennessee | W 78−70; L 58–65 |
| 1988 | #9 | First Round | #8 South Carolina | L 63–77 |
| 1992 | #5 | First Round; Second Round | #12 Tennessee Tech #4 Western Kentucky | W 100−87; L 68–98 |
| 1993 | #5 | First Round; Second Round | #12 Georgia Southern #4 North Carolina | W 102−70; L 73–74 (OT) |
| 1994 | #6 | First Round; Second Round; Sweet Sixteen; Elite Eight; Final Four | #11 Oregon State #3 Iowa #2 Texas Tech #1 Penn State #4 Louisiana Tech | W 96−86; W 84–78; W 73–68; W 96–82; L 66–69 |
| 1995 | #4 | First Round; Second Round; Sweet Sixteen | #13 Mount St. Mary's #5 Duke #1 Connecticut | W 82−55; W 121–120 (4OT); L 56–87 |
| 1996 | #4 | First Round; Second Round; Sweet Sixteen | #13 Appalachian State #5 NC State #1 Stanford | W 95−66; W 88–68; L 76–78 |
| 1997 | #2 | First Round; Second Round; Sweet Sixteen | #15 Saint Francis (PA) #7 St. Joseph's #6 Notre Dame | W 94−50; W 61–52; L 71–87 |
| 1998 | #2 | First Round; Second Round; Sweet Sixteen | #15 UNC Greensboro #7 UCLA #3 Louisiana Tech | W 94−46; W 75–74; L 57–71 |
| 1999 | #5 | First Round; Second Round | #12 Grambling #4 North Carolina | W 80−68; L 56–70 |
| 2021 | #7 | First Round; Second Round | #10 North Carolina #2 Maryland | W 80–71; L 64–100 |
| 2023 | #10 | First Round | #7 Baylor | L 74–78 |
| 2024 | #8 | First Round; Second Round | #9 Florida State #1 Texas | W 82–74; L 54–65 |
| 2025 | #5 | First Round; Second Round | #12 Green Bay #4 Maryland | W 81–67; L 108–111 (2OT) |
| 2026 | #6 | First Round; Second Round | #11 Rhode Island #3 Louisville | W 68–55; L 68–69 |

== WNIT Tournament results ==
| Year | Round | Opponent | Result |
|---|---|---|---|
| 2000 | First | Chattanooga | L 70–68 |
| 2001 | First | Memphis | W 77–67 |
| 2001 | Second | Alabama–Birmingham | L 84–72 |
| 2002 | First | Missouri | W 68–67 |
| 2002 | Second | Eastern Kentucky | W 99–77 |
| 2002 | Quarterfinals | Michigan State | L 79–61 |
| 2011 | First | Memphis | W 80–69 |
| 2011 | Second | Northwestern | W 72–70 |
| 2011 | Regional semifinals | Toledo | L 74–59 |
| 2016 | Round 1 | Tulane | L 53–52 |
| 2017 | Round 1 | Mercer | W 81–57 |
| 2017 | Round 2 | Little Rock | W 55–53 |
| 2017 | Round 3 | Tulane | W 72–64 |
| 2017 | Quarterfinals | Georgia Tech | L 76–66 |
| 2018 | Round 1 | Southern | W 69–56 |
| 2018 | Round 2 | UCF | W 80–61 |
| 2018 | Round 3 | Georgia Tech | W 61–59 |
| 2018 | Quarterfinals | Virginia Tech | L 74–67 |
| 2022 | Round 1 | Troy | W 82–79 |
| 2022 | Round 2 | Tulane | W 81–77 |
| 2022 | Round 3 | Houston | W 79–64 |
| 2022 | Quarterfinals | South Dakota State | L 78–73 |
