= Rick Moody (coach) =

American basketball coach (born 1954)

Biographical details
- Born: May 26, 1954 (age 72)
- Education: Troy University

Coaching career (HC unless noted)
- 1989–2005: Alabama
- 2007–2008: Syracuse (assistant)

Head coaching record
- Overall: 311–176

Rick Moody (born May 26, 1954) is a former women's basketball assistant coach at Syracuse University, arriving in 2007. He previously served as the head coach for Alabama Crimson Tide women's basketball from 1990 to 2005. He is Alabama's all-time leader in games won among basketball coaches at Alabama in terms of wins and winning percentage. His 310 total wins are more than all other Crimson Tide women's basketball coaches combined.

Coach Moody led his Alabama squads to 11 post-season tournaments including eight trips to the NCAA Tournament. In the NCAA Tournaments involving Alabama while coached by Moody, Alabama advanced to five straight Sweet Sixteen appearances, as well as its only Final Four appearance in 1994. Alabama women's basketball enjoyed eight seasons of winning 20 or more games while Moody was the head coach. The 1994 team was the only Alabama team, men's or women's, to make the Final Four until Nate Oats took his Alabama men's team to the Final Four 30 years later.

He also led the Tide to a record 26 wins in the 1993–94 season. Under his direction, Alabama reached a final top-25 ranking eight times. In addition, they recorded 44 wins over nationally ranked opponents including nine versus top-10 squads. His coaching career is also highlighted by outstanding numbers, including 19 regular-season tournament titles, 145 home victories, 97 regular-season SEC wins and 13 SEC Tournament victories.

== Head coaching record ==
Record table
Season	Team	Overall	Conference	Standing	Postseason
Alabama Crimson Tide (Southeastern Conference) (1989–2005)
1989–90	Alabama	16–12	4–5	7th	
1990–91	Alabama	17–12	3–6	9th	
1991–92	Alabama	23–7	7–4	3rd	NCAA second round
1992–93	Alabama	22–9	6–5	5th	NCAA second round
1993–94	Alabama	26–7	7–4	4th	NCAA Final Four
1994–95	Alabama	22–9	7–4	6th	NCAA sweet sixteen
1995–96	Alabama	24–8	7–4	4th	NCAA sweet sixteen
1996–97	Alabama	25–7	10–2	2nd	NCAA sweet sixteen
1997–98	Alabama	24–10	10–4	2nd	NCAA sweet sixteen
1998–99	Alabama	20–11	7–7	5th	NCAA second round
1999–2000	Alabama	15–14	5–9	8th	WNIT first round
2000–01	Alabama	19–12	5–9	8th	WNIT second round
2001–02	Alabama	19–12	7–7	8th	WNIT quarterfinals
2002–03	Alabama	13–15	3–11	10th	
2003–04	Alabama	12–16	4–10	10th	
2004–05	Alabama	14–15	4–10	9th	
Alabama:		311–176 (.639)	96–101 (.487)		
Total:		311–176 (.639)			
National champion Postseason invitational champion Conference regular season champion Conference regular season and conference tournament champion Division regular season champion Division regular season and conference tournament champion Conference tournament champion
