= Georgia Tech Yellow Jackets women's basketball =

Women's college basketball team

2026–27 Georgia Tech Yellow Jackets women's basketball team
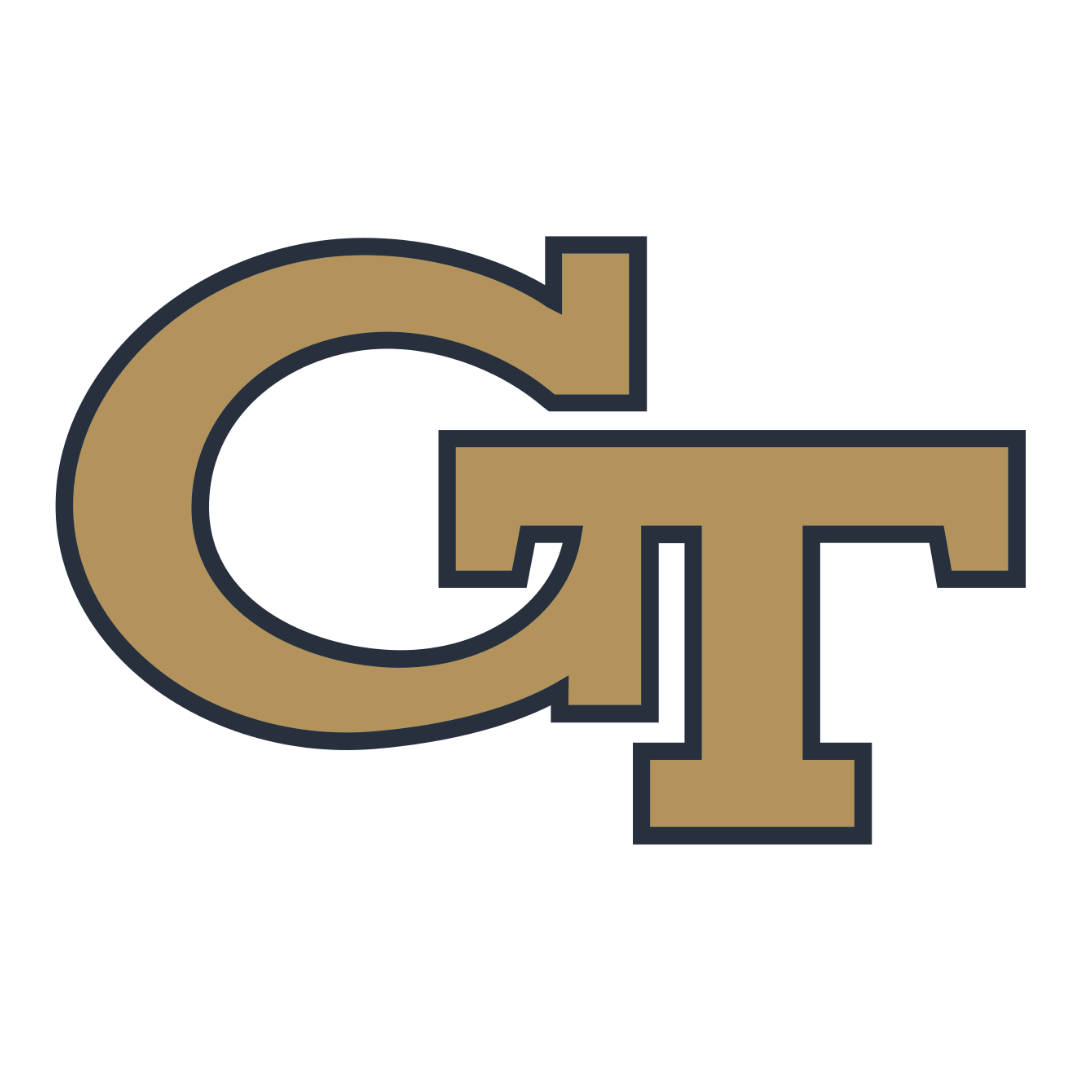
- University: Georgia Institute of Technology
- Head coach: Karen Blair (2nd season)
- Location: Atlanta, Georgia
- Arena: McCamish Pavilion (capacity: 8,600)
- Conference: Atlantic Coast Conference
- Nickname: Yellow Jackets
- Colors: Gold and white

NCAA Division I tournament Sweet Sixteen
- 2012, 2021

NCAA Division I tournament appearances
- 1993, 2003, 2007, 2008, 2009, 2010, 2011, 2012, 2014, 2021, 2022, 2025

Uniforms
Home	Away	Alternate

The Georgia Tech Yellow Jackets women's basketball team is the college basketball program representing the Georgia Institute of Technology in the Atlantic Coast Conference (ACC) of NCAA Division I. The team plays its home games at McCamish Pavilion.

== Players ==
Notable players who have played with the Yellow Jackets include Niesha Butler, Kisha Ford, and Chioma Nnamaka.

== Stadium ==
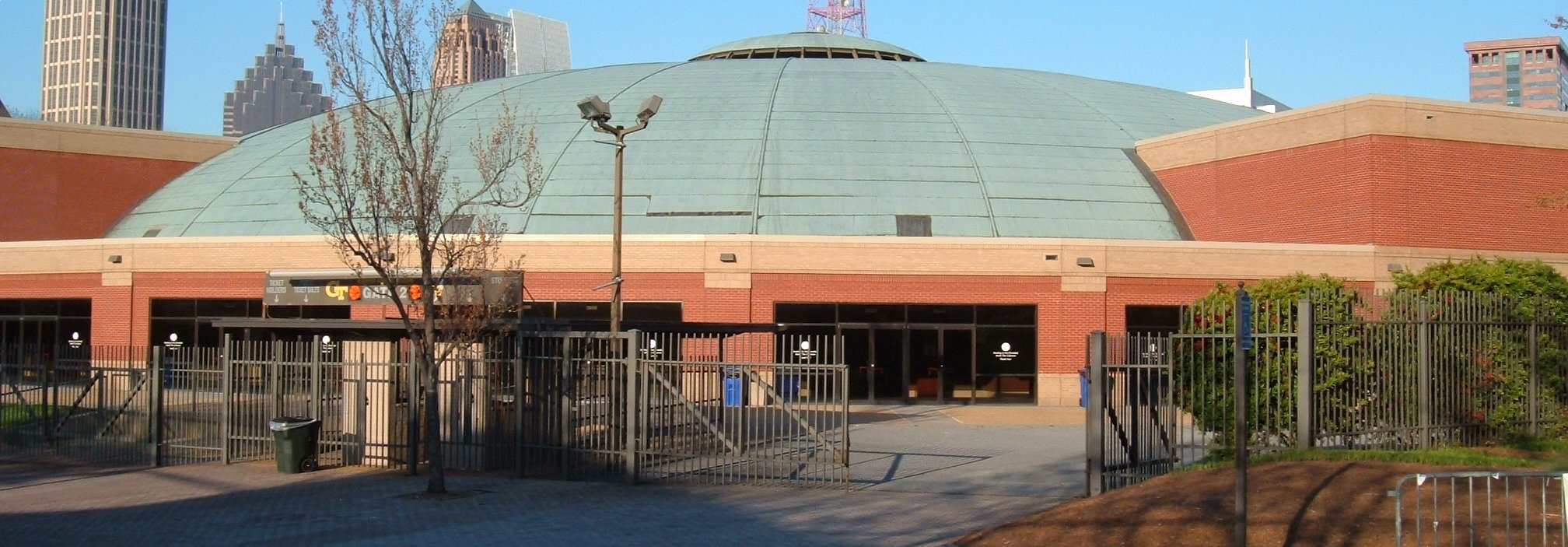
McCamish Pavilion has been home to the Yellow Jackets since 1956.

McCamish Pavilion (also nicknamed "The Thrillerdome") is an indoor arena located in Atlanta, Georgia. It is the home of the Georgia Tech basketball teams and hosted the Atlanta Hawks of the National Basketball Association from 1968 to 1972 and again from 1997 to 1999. Tech's women's volleyball team has occasionally used the facility as well, primarily for NCAA tournament games and other matches that draw crowds that would overflow the O'Keefe Gymnasium.

During the 2011–12 basketball season, Alexander Memorial Coliseum was rebuilt as McCamish Pavilion. Except for the final home game, the Georgia Tech women's basketball team played its home games at The Arena at Gwinnett Center in suburban Duluth.

== Year by year results ==
Conference tournament winners noted with # Source

Season	Team	Overall	Conference	Standing	Postseason	Coaches' poll	AP poll
Jim Culpepper (Independent, ACC) (1974–1980)
1974–75	Jim Culpepper	6–16	–		GAIAW State Tournament		
1975–76	Jim Culpepper	2–24	–		GAIAW State Tournament		
1976–77	Jim Culpepper	19–8	–		GAIAW State Tournament		
1977–78	Jim Culpepper	23–4	–		GAIAW State Tournament		
1978–79	Jim Culpepper	18–8	–		GAIAW State Tournament		
Atlantic Coast Conference
1979–80	Jim Culpepper	2–23	1–7	7th	GAIAW State Tournament		
Jim Culpepper:		70–83	1–8				
Benny Dees (ACC) (1980–1981)
1980–81	Benny Dees	8–19	1–6	7th			
Benny Dees:		8–19	1–6				
Bernadette McGlade (ACC) (1981–1988)
1981–82	Bernadette McGlade	9–16	2–9	7th			
1982–83	Bernadette McGlade	10–19	2–11	7th			
1983–84	Bernadette McGlade	9–19	1–13	8th			
1984–85	Bernadette McGlade	11–16	0–14	8th			
1985–86	Bernadette McGlade	10–17	1–13	8th			
1986–87	Bernadette McGlade	14–13	5–9	6th			
1987–88	Bernadette McGlade	11–16	3–11	T-7th			
Bernadette McGlade:		74–116	14–80				
Agnus Berenato (ACC) (1988–2003)
1988–89	Agnus Berenato	14–14	5–9	6th			
1989–90	Agnus Berenato	13–17	4–10	T-6th			
1990–91	Agnus Berenato	15–13	3–11	7th			
1991–92	Agnus Berenato	20–13	6–10	7th	NWIT Champions		
1992–93	Agnus Berenato	16–11	8–8	T-4th	NCAA First Round		
1993–94	Agnus Berenato	12–15	5–11	7th			
1994–95	Agnus Berenato	14–16	5–11	6th			
1995–96	Agnus Berenato	14–13	5–11	8th			
1996–97	Agnus Berenato	15–12	7–9	7th			
1997–98	Agnus Berenato	11–17	3–13	8th			
1998–99	Agnus Berenato	13–14	6–10	6th			
1999–2000	Agnus Berenato	17–14	7–9	6th	WNIT Quarterfinals		
2000–01	Agnus Berenato	14–15	5–11	8th	WNIT First Round		
2001–02	Agnus Berenato	15–14	7–9	T-5th	WNIT First Round		
2002–03	Agnus Berenato	20–11	8–8	T-4th	NCAA First Round		
Agnus Berenato:		223–209	84–150				
MaChelle Joseph (ACC) (2003–2019)
2003–04	MaChelle Joseph	14–15	5–11	8th			
2004–05	MaChelle Joseph	13–14	4–10	T-8th			
2005–06	MaChelle Joseph	14–15	2–12	T-11th			
2006–07	MaChelle Joseph	21–12	9–5	6th	NCAA Second Round		
2007–08	MaChelle Joseph	22–10	7–7	T-5th	NCAA First Round		
2008–09	MaChelle Joseph	22–10	8–6	T-5th	NCAA Second Round		
2009–10	MaChelle Joseph	23–10	8–6	4th	NCAA First Round		
2010–11	MaChelle Joseph	24–11	9–8	T-4th	NCAA Second Round		24
2011–12	MaChelle Joseph	26–9	12–4	T-4th	NCAA Sweet Sixteen	10	15
2012–13	MaChelle Joseph	14–16	7–11	T-7th			
2013–14	MaChelle Joseph	20–12	9–7	7th	NCAA First Round		
2014–15	MaChelle Joseph	19–15	7–9	11th	WNIT Second Round		
2015–16	MaChelle Joseph	20–13	8–8	8th	WNIT Second Round		
2016–17	MaChelle Joseph	22–15	5–11	10th	WNIT Runner-Up		RV
2017–18	MaChelle Joseph	20–14	6–10	10th	WNIT Third Round		
2018–19	MaChelle Joseph	17–13	7–9	9th			
MaChelle Joseph:		311–204	113–131				
Nell Fortner (ACC) (2019–2025)
2019–20	Nell Fortner	20–11	10–8	7th			
2020–21	Nell Fortner	17–9	12–6	3rd	NCAA Sweet Sixteen	22	
2021–22	Nell Fortner	21–11	11–7	6th	NCAA First Round		
2022–23	Nell Fortner	13–17	4–14	14th			
2023–24	Nell Fortner	17–16	7–11	T-10th	WBIT First Round		
2024–25	Nell Fortner	22–11	9–9	T-8th	NCAA First Round		
Nell Fortner:		110–75	53–55				
Karen Blair (ACC) (2025–present)
2025–26	Karen Blair	14–19	8–10	T–11th			
Karen Blair:		14–19	8–10				
Total:		810–725 (.528)					
National champion Postseason invitational champion Conference regular season champion Conference regular season and conference tournament champion Division regular season champion Division regular season and conference tournament champion Conference tournament champion

== NCAA tournament results ==
Georgia Tech has appeared in the NCAA Division I women's basketball tournament twelve times. They have a record of 7–12.

Year	Seed	Round	Opponent	Result
1993	#9	First round	#8 Northwestern	L 90–62
2003	#10	First round	#7 Virginia Tech	L 61–59
2007	#7	First round Second round	#10 DePaul #2 Purdue	W 55–54; L 76–63
2008	#10	First round	#7 Iowa State	L 58–55
2009	#9	First round Second round	#8 Iowa #1 Oklahoma	W 76–62; L 69–50
2010	#6	First round	#11 Arkansas-Little Rock	L 63–53
2011	#5	First round Second round	#12 Bowling Green #4 Ohio State	W 69–58; L 67–60
2012	#4	First round Second round Sweet Sixteen	#13 Sacred Heart #5 Georgetown #1 Baylor	W 76–50; W 76–64; L 83–68
2014	#10	First round	#7 LSU	L 98–78
2021	#5	First round Second round Sweet Sixteen	#12 Stephen F. Austin #4 West Virginia #1 South Carolina	W 54–52 (OT); W 73–56; L 65–76
2022	#9	First round	#8 Kansas	L 58–77
2025	#9	First round	#8 Richmond	L 49–74

== Roster ==
2026–27 Georgia Tech Yellow Jackets women's basketball team
Players
Coaches

Pos.	#	Name	Height	Year	Previous school	Hometown
G	0	Kyndal Walker	5 ft 9 in (1.75 m)	Jr	Maryland	Beltsville, MD
G	3	Erica Moon	5 ft 6 in (1.68 m)	Sr	Texas A&M	Atlanta, GA
G	4	Leyre Urdiain	5 ft 11 in (1.8 m)	RS So	Sansueña	Zaragoza, Spain
G	5	Sofia Muñoz	5 ft 8 in (1.73 m)	So	UAB	Canóvanas, Puerto Rico
G	10	Autumn Washington	6 ft 0 in (1.83 m)	Fr	Ardrey Kell	Charlotte, NC
F	11	Penda Dieng	6 ft 3 in (1.91 m)	So	Xavier	Louga, Senegal
G	12	Jordan Ode	6 ft 0 in (1.83 m)	So	Michigan State	Maple Grove, MN
C	13	Déborah Mukeba	6 ft 5 in (1.96 m)	Jr	Boston College	Fleurus, Belgium
C	20	Ariadna Termis	6 ft 6 in (1.98 m)	Sr	IES Joaquím Blume	Zaragoza, Spain
G	21	Talayah Walker	5 ft 10 in (1.78 m)	Jr	Penn State	Odenton, MD
G	22	Inés Noguero	5 ft 11 in (1.8 m)	GS	IES Joaquím Blume	Gijón, Spain
G	23	La'Nya Foster	5 ft 10 in (1.78 m)	Sr	Austin Peay	Riverdale, GA
G	24	Anna Conza	5 ft 8 in (1.73 m)	Jr	Oglethorpe	Long Island, NY
G/F	35	Antonia Bates	6 ft 3 in (1.91 m)	GS	Rutgers	Easton, PA

Head coach

- Karen Blair (SMU)

Assistant coach(es)

- Marsha Frese (Rice)
- Chris Meadows (St. Bonaventure)
- Ben Kantor (Illinois)
- Morgan Williams (Georgetown)
- Caleb Currier (Tennessee)

Legend

- (C) Team captain
- (S) Suspended
- (I) Ineligible
- (W) Walk-on
- Injured
- Current redshirt

Roster
Last update: August 30, 2026
