= Audra Smith =

American basketball coach

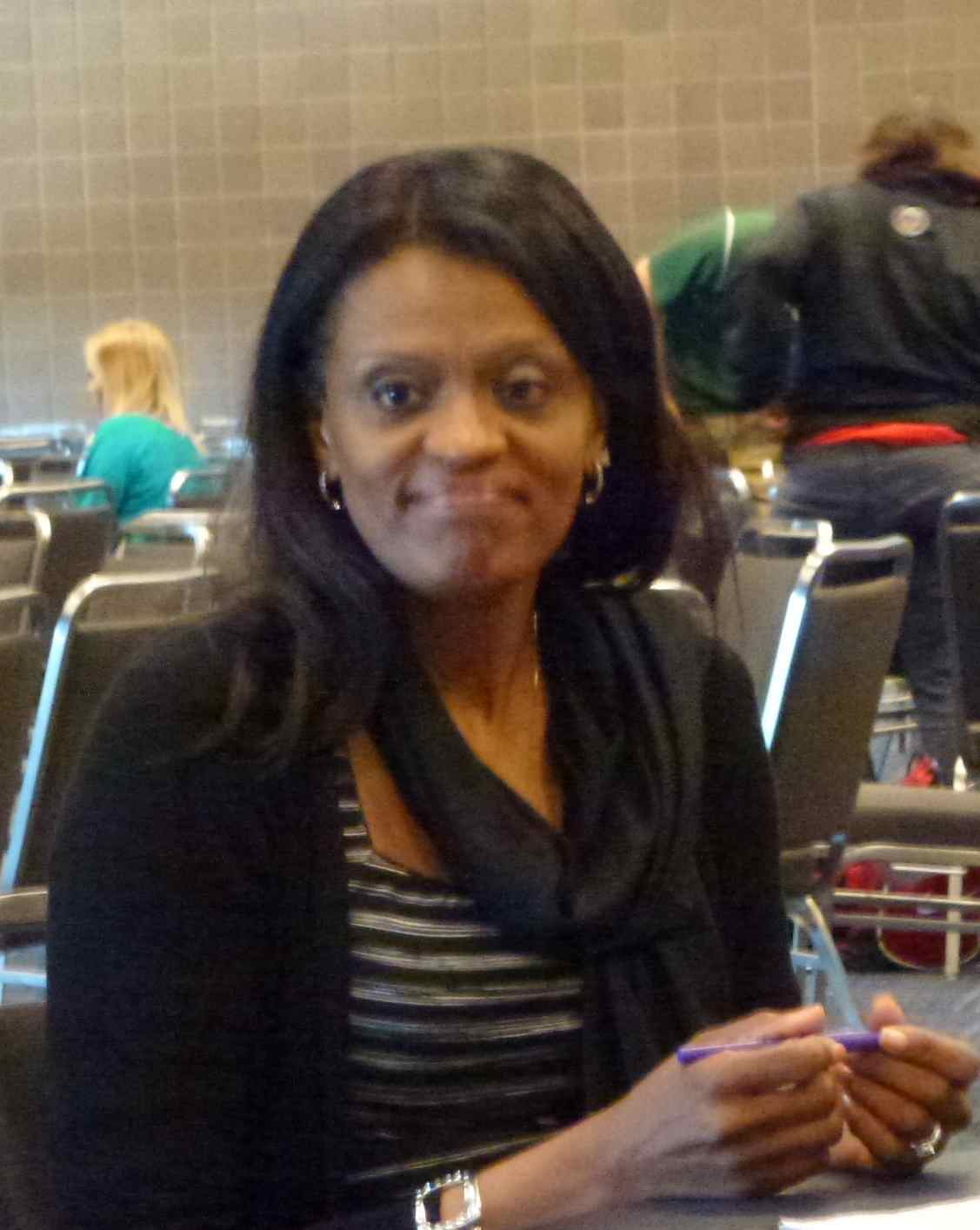

Biographical details
- Born: January 23, 1970 (age 56); Milledgeville, Georgia

Playing career
- 1988–1992: Virginia

Coaching career (HC unless noted)
- 1994–2004: Virginia (asst.)
- 2004–2012: UAB
- 2012–2018: Clemson
- 2018–2022: South Carolina State

Head coaching record
- Overall: 214–310 (.408)

Accomplishments and honors

Awards
- Miss Georgia Basketball (1988)

Audra Smith (born January 23, 1970) is a head women's basketball coach .

== Career ==
Smith played basketball at the University of Virginia, graduating with a degree in sociology in 1992. Beginning in 1994, she served as an assistant coach for the Cavaliers for 10 seasons.

In the 2004–05 season, Smith became head coach at the University of Alabama Birmingham. She coached UAB for eight seasons. During the 2006 season, UAB went 19–13, including a 12–4 Conference USA mark, as UAB set records for most Conference USA wins in a season. UAB was selected to the Women's National Invitation Tournament (WNIT) tournament that year, reaching the second round. In the 2005 season, she posted a 14–14 record and a 7–9 CUSA record.

On April 8, 2013, Smith was announced as the head coach of the Clemson Tigers, where she remained until 2018.

On June 7, 2018, Smith was announced as the next head coach of South Carolina State.

== Head coaching record ==
Record table
Season	Team	Overall	Conference	Standing	Postseason
UAB (Conference USA) (2004–2012)
2004–05	UAB	7-21	4-10	T-10th	
2005–06	UAB	14-14	7-9	9th	
2006–07	UAB	19-13	13-4	2nd	WNIT Second Round
2007–08	UAB	14-16	10-6	3rd	
2008–09	UAB	10-20	5-11	T-5th	
2009–10	UAB	17-15	8-8	6th	
2010–11	UAB	20-15	7-9	T-7th	WBI Champions
2011–12	UAB	19-11	9-7	T-3rd	
2012–13	UAB	18-13	9-7	4th	WNIT First Round
UAB:		138–138 (.500)	72–71 (.503)		
Clemson (Atlantic Coast Conference) (2013–2018)
2013–14	Clemson	13-19	4-12	T-12th	
2014–15	Clemson	9-21	1-15	T-14th	
2015–16	Clemson	4-24	0-15	15th	
2016–17	Clemson	15-16	3-13	T-13th	
2017–18	Clemson	11-19	1-15	15th	
Clemson:		52–99 (.344)	9–70 (.114)		
South Carolina State (Mid-Eastern Athletic Conference) (2018–present)
2018–19	South Carolina State	16–16	8–8	T-6th	
2019–20	South Carolina State	3–27	2–14	11th	
2020–21	South Carolina State	1–9	0–2	4th (South)	
2021–22	South Carolina State	4–21*	4–7*		
South Carolina State:		24–73 (.247)	14–31 (.311)	* Fired before the end of the season	
Total:		214–310 (.408)			
National champion Postseason invitational champion Conference regular season champion Conference regular season and conference tournament champion Division regular season champion Division regular season and conference tournament champion Conference tournament champion
