= Jimmy Dykes (basketball) =

American coach and broadcaster (born 1961)

Biographical details
- Born: May 3, 1961 (age 65)
- Education: Arkansas

Coaching career (HC unless noted)
- 1984–1985: Arkansas (asst.)
- 1985–1986: Sacramento State (asst.)
- 1986–1987: Appalachian State (asst.)
- 1987–1989: Kentucky (asst.)
- 1989–1990: Arkansas-Little Rock (asst.)
- 1990–1991: Oklahoma State (asst.)
- 1991–1993: Seattle SuperSonics (scout)
- 2014–2017: Arkansas

Head coaching record
- Overall: 43–49
- Tournaments: 1–1

Jimmy Dykes (born May 3, 1961) is a former American college basketball coach and current sportscaster for ESPN and SEC Network. He was the women's basketball head coach at the University of Arkansas until resigning in March 2017.

Before making the transition to working for ESPN the first time, Dykes served as a men's assistant basketball coach at University of Arkansas, Appalachian State University, University of Kentucky, Arkansas State University, University of Arkansas at Little Rock, and Oklahoma State University. He has also served as a scout for the NBA's Seattle SuperSonics. Dykes also served as Shiloh Christian School's (located in Springdale, Arkansas) Director of Athletics, hiring Gus Malzahn as the school’s head football coach in 1996.

== Head coaching career ==
=== Arkansas (2014–17) ===
Jimmy Dykes was announced as the new head coach of the University of Arkansas women's basketball team on March 30, 2014. Dykes replaced Tom Collen as the women's head coach at Arkansas after Collen was fired at the end of the 2013–2014 season.

In his first year at Arkansas, Dykes led his team of nine players to the NCAA tournament after finishing in the middle of the pack of the SEC. His Razorbacks defeated 7 seed Northwestern before falling to second seeded Baylor in the second round.

Dykes' second year saw the team finish 10th in the SEC and with a losing record overall, at 12–18. His third team finished last in the conference, winning only two league games.

== Personal life ==
Dykes is a 1985 graduate of the University of Arkansas, where he played basketball for the Razorbacks and former head coach Eddie Sutton.

Dykes currently resides in Johnson, Arkansas. He is married to Tiffany Beasley, a former Razorback cheerleader. The two have one daughter, Kennedy, born in 2005. Dykes is a Christian.

Jimmy lived in Nashville early in his career for 9 months while pursuing a career in country music.

== Head coaching record ==
Record table
Season	Team	Overall	Conference	Standing	Postseason
Arkansas Razorbacks (Southeastern Conference) (2014–2017)
2014–15	Arkansas	18–14	6–10	T–9th	NCAA Division I Second Round
2015–16	Arkansas	12–18	7–9	10th	
2016–17	Arkansas	13–17	2–14	14th	
Arkansas:		43–49 (.467)	15–33 (.313)		
Total:		43–49 (.467)			
