= Wendell Hudson =

American basketball coach and player (born 1951)

Personal information
- Born: April 16, 1951 (age 75) Birmingham, Alabama, U.S.
- Listed height: 6 ft 6 in (1.98 m)
- Listed weight: 185 lb (84 kg)

Career information
- High school: A. H. Parker (Birmingham, Alabama)
- College: Alabama (1969–1973)
- NBA draft: 1973: 2nd round, 30th overall pick
- Drafted by: Chicago Bulls
- Position: Forward
- Number: 20
- Coaching career: 1974–2013

Career history

Coaching
- 1974–1979: Alabama (assistant)
- 1979–1982: North Alabama (assistant)
- 1982–1983: Rice (assistant)
- 1983–1985: Ole Miss (assistant)
- 1985–1986: Baylor (assistant)
- 1986–1999: McLennan CC (women's HC)
- 2001–2003: McLennan CC (men's HC)
- 2008–2013: Alabama (women's HC)

Career highlights
- As player: SEC Player of the Year – AP (1973); No. 20 retired by Alabama Crimson Tide
- Stats at Basketball Reference

Wendell Hudson (born April 16, 1951) is a retired American basketball player and former Associate Athletics Director for Alumni Relations and the former women's basketball program head coach of Alabama Crimson Tide women's basketball. In 1969, Hudson signed for Alabama coach C.M. Newton and thus became the first African-American scholarship athlete in any sport at the University of Alabama. On April 22, 2013, Hudson resigned after he served five seasons as head coach of the Alabama women's basketball team. He now serves in an administrative role in the athletic department.

On February 17, 2020, Hudson's number 20 jersey was retired by the Alabama men's basketball team, becoming the first and only player to have their jersey number retired by the program.

== Head coaching record ==
=== NCAA Division I women ===
Record table
Season	Team	Overall	Conference	Standing	Postseason
Alabama (Southeastern Conference) (2008–2013)
2008–09	Alabama	13–17	1–13	12th	
2009–10	Alabama	12–18	4–12	11th	
2010–11	Alabama	18–15	5–11	10th	WNIT Third Round
2011–12	Alabama	12–19	2–14	11th	
2012–13	Alabama	13–18	2–14	T–13th	
Alabama:		68–87	14–64		
Total:		68–87 (.439)			
National champion Postseason invitational champion Conference regular season champion Conference regular season and conference tournament champion Division regular season champion Division regular season and conference tournament champion Conference tournament champion
