= Arkansas Razorbacks women's basketball =

2026–27 Arkansas Razorbacks women's basketball team
- University: University of Arkansas
- First season: 1976–77; 50 years ago
- Athletic director: Hunter Yurachek
- Head coach: Kelsi Musick (2nd season)
- Location: Fayetteville, Arkansas
- Arena: Bud Walton Arena (capacity: 19,200)
- Conference: SEC
- Nickname: Razorbacks
- Colors: Cardinal and white
- All-time record: 895–618 (.592)

NCAA Division I tournament Final Four
- 1998
Other NCAA Division I tournament results
Elite Eight	1990, 1998
Sweet Sixteen	1990, 1991, 1998
Appearances	1986, 1989, 1990, 1991, 1995, 1998, 2001, 2002, 2003, 2012, 2015, 2021, 2022

AIAW tournament appearances
- 1982

Conference tournament champions
- 1991 (SWC)

Conference regular-season champions
- 1990, 1991 (SWC)

WNIT champions
- 1999

NWIT champions
- 1987

Uniforms
Home	Away

The Arkansas Razorbacks women's basketball team represents the University of Arkansas in Fayetteville, Arkansas, United States in NCAA Division I women's basketball competition. The school's team currently competes in the Southeastern Conference.

The basketball team plays its home games in Bud Walton Arena on the University of Arkansas campus and are led by first-year head coach Kelsi Musick.

== History ==
Women's basketball has been a part of the fabric of the University of Arkansas for almost a century. Teams of female students took to outdoor courts and peach baskets just after the turn of the century. While the women waited until 1976 for the first varsity team to officially represent the University, these early photos show how the game captured what was then deemed “the fairer sex” in action.

Arkansas' women's basketball history can be definitively traced to the 1976–77 season when the University began keeping records. Since that time, the Razorback women's basketball team has made two SWAIAW Regional appearances, one AIAW Sweet 16 appearance, 8 NWIT and WNIT appearances, and 11 NCAA Tournament appearances including reaching the Final Four in 1998, winning the WNIT in 1999, beating Wisconsin 67–64, and winning the NWIT in 1987, beating California 112-80.

=== SWC Title ===
Arkansas was the first team to beat Texas and the first team to win a share, then later an outright, Southwest Conference championship besides the Lady Longhorns. In 1991, Arkansas also ended the Texas’ dominance of the SWC tournament by defeating Texas Tech for the title. These three trophies— the 1990 and 1991 regular season championships and 1991 SWC Classic tournament title—are the only SWC women’s basketball trophies in captivity outside the state of Texas.

=== NCAA Final Four ===
In 1998, Arkansas made NCAA Tournament history as the lowest seed–#9 in the West—to advance to the Final Four. They were the first unranked team in women’s basketball history during the modern era to reach the Final Four. And, they were the lowest finishing team in conference play—tied for sixth in the SEC—to reach the Final Four. Arkansas spent two weeks in the Bay Area. Along the way, the Razorbacks beat three conference champions—WAC, Pacific, Ivy and ACC—and three ranked teams—Hawai’i, Kansas and Duke—to face conference rival Tennessee at Kansas City.

Arkansas played all four of its pre-Final Four games on late night TV, earning the nickname of Good Morning America’s team. Every member of the team contributed to the run, starting with a 24-point effort by Karyn Karlin in the opening round win over #20 Hawai’i, 76–70. Then it was freshman Wendi Willits’ turn with a near-NCAA record six three-pointers to blow open Arkansas’ second round contest with Harvard, 82–64. In the opening round games held at Stanford, Christy Smith had zero turnovers and 16 assists.

At the West Regionals in Oakland, junior Sytia Messer stepped to the front as Arkansas’ leading scorer in both wins, earning herself the honor as the most outstanding player at the West Regional. Messer had 23 points as Arkansas used an impressive 54-point second half to dispatch Kansas, 79–63, in the Sweet 16. Fellow junior Treva Christensen announced herself with 14 points off the bench against Duke to earn all-tournament selection. Junior Tennille Adams was 6-of-9 with 14 off the bench including the go-ahead bucket in the closing minutes against Duke.

Smith calmly sank four free throws in the final seconds to send Arkansas to the Final Four for the first time with a 77–72 win over ACC champion Duke.

== List of head coaches ==
- Sharon Ogle (1976–1978)
- Joan Henn (1978–1981)
- Matilda Willis (1981–1984)
- John Sutherland (1984–1993)
- Gary Blair (1993–2003)
- Susie Gardner (2003–2007)
- Tom Collen (2007–2014)
- Jimmy Dykes (2014–2017)
- Mike Neighbors (2017–2025)
- Kelsi Musick (2025–present)

== Postseason ==
=== NCAA Division I ===
The Razorbacks have appeared in the NCAA Division I women's basketball tournament thirteen times. Their record is 14–13.

Year	Seed	Round	Opponent	Result
1986	#8	First Round	#9 Missouri	L 65–66
1989	#12	First Round	#5 Purdue	L 63–91
1990	#7	First Round; Second Round; Sweet Sixteen; Elite Eight	#10 UCLA #2 Georgia #3 Stephen F. Austin #1 Stanford	W 90–80 (OT); W 81–70; W 87–82; L 87–114
1991	#3	Second Round; Sweet Sixteen	#6 Northwestern #10 Lamar	W 105–68; L 75–91
1995	#6	First Round; Second Round	#11 San Francisco #3 Washington	W 67–58; L 50–54
1998	#9	First Round; Second Round; Sweet Sixteen; Elite Eight; Final Four	#8 Hawaii #16 Harvard #5 Kansas #2 Duke #1 Tennessee	W 76–70; W 82–64; W 79–63; W 77–72; L 58–86
2001	#9	First Round; Second Round	#8 Baylor #1 Duke	W 68–59; L 54–75
2002	#6	First Round; Second Round	#11 Clemson #3 Kansas State	W 78–68; L 68–82
2003	#7	First Round; Second Round	#10 Cincinnati #2 Texas	W 71–57; L 50–67
2012	#6	First Round; Second Round	#11 Dayton #3 Texas A&M	W 72–55; L 59–61
2015	#10	First Round; Second Round	#7 Northwestern #2 Baylor	W 57–55; L 44–73
2021	#4	First Round	#13 Wright State	L 62–66
2022	#10	First Round	#7 Utah	L 69–92

=== WNIT ===
Overtime period - *

Year	Round	Opponent	Result
1999	First	Northwestern State	W 78–60
1999	Second	Oklahoma	W 97–93*
1999	Quarterfinals	Rice	W 76–60
1999	Semi finals	Drake	W 67–64
1999	Finals	Wisconsin	W 80–77
2000	First	Wichita State	W 83–63
2000	Second	Missouri	W 89–88
2000	Quarterfinals	Georgia Tech	W 78–67
2000	Semi finals	Florida	L 83–62
2005	First	UNLV	W 61–48
2005	Second	Arkansas State	L 98–84
2009	Round 2	Oklahoma State	W 61–60 *
2009	Round 3	Kansas	L 75–59
2011	First	Lamar	W 91–65
2011	Second	Missouri State	W 65–64
2011	Regional semifinals	Oral Roberts	W 78–59
2011	Regional finals	Illinois State	L 60–49
2013	First	Memphis	W 67–57
2013	Second	Tulane	L 60–48
2019	Round 1	Houston	W 88–80 *
2019	Round 2	UAB	W 100–52
2019	Round 3	TCU	L 82–78
2023	Round 1	Louisiana Tech	W 69–47
2023	Round 2	Stephen F. Austin	W 60–37
2023	Super 16	Texas Tech	W 71–66
2023	Great 8	Kansas	L 78–64

=== AIAW Division I ===
The Razorbacks made one appearance in the AIAW National Division I basketball tournament, with a combined record of 0–1.

Year	Round	Opponent	Result
1982	First Round	California	L, 62–66
