= Tom Collen =

American college basketball coach

Biographical details
- Born: December 21, 1953 (age 72); Lancaster, Ohio, U.S.
- Education: BGSU ('77)

Coaching career (HC unless noted)
- 1981–1984: Miami (OH) (asst.)
- 1984–1986: Utah (asst.)
- 1986–1993: Purdue (asst.)
- 1993–1997: Arkansas (asst.)
- 1997–2002: Colorado State
- 2003–2007: Louisville
- 2007–2014: Arkansas

Head coaching record
- Overall: 349–160 (.686)

Thomas Duane Collen (born December 21, 1953) is an American college basketball coach who was most recently the women's basketball head coach at the University of Arkansas.

== Early life ==
Collen was born December 21, 1953 in Lancaster, Ohio, and received his bachelor's degree in physical education from Bowling Green State University in 1977. He earned a master's degree in health education from Miami University (of Ohio) in 1982, and another in 1983 in recreational programming.

== Coaching career ==
Collen began his coaching career at Miami University in 1981, where he worked for three seasons. He was assistant coach at the University of Utah from 1984 to 1986, and at the Purdue University from 1986 to 1993.

In 1993, he moved to the University of Arkansas, where he was assistant coach and recruiting coordinator under head coach Gary Blair until 1997. He was named assistant head coach for his last two seasons. The year after he left, Arkansas went to the 1998 Final Four of the NCAA Women's Division I Basketball Championship. Arkansas' women's athletic director Bev Lewis said "his reputation as a recruiter is among the best in the country."

Collen left the University of Arkansas in 1997 to take the head coaching job at Colorado State University. Colorado State went to the NCAA Tournament four times in five seasons under his leadership. In 1999, his team played in the NCAA Sweet Sixteen, and Collen was named coach of the year. His winning percentage of 79.6% (129 wins and 33 losses) ranked fourth among Division I women's basketball coaches at the time.

After the 2001–2002 season, Collen accepted a position at Vanderbilt University but resigned the next day over a discrepancy discovered on his resume. He had listed two master's degrees from Miami University, but Miami had reported only one degree in two subjects. Miami later acknowledged its mistake. By then both Vanderbilt and Colorado State had new head coaches. Collen took a year off from coaching, working as a television commentator and a consultant for the WNBA.

On March 11, 2003, the University of Louisville hired Collen as women's basketball head coach; this was the second time athletic director Tom Jurich hired Collen to that position after doing the same at Colorado State in 1997. During Collen's four seasons, Louisville had an 87–37 record and made the NCAA tournament three times.

In 2007, Collen returned to Arkansas, this time as women's basketball head coach. Under his leadership the team began the 2007 season with a school record 15 consecutive wins.

Collen was dismissed from his position at the University of Arkansas on March 7, 2014, following a 19–11 season.

== Head coaching record ==
Record table
Season	Team	Overall	Conference	Standing	Postseason
Colorado State (Western Athletic Conference) (1997–2002)
1997–98	Colorado State	24–6	11–3	T-2nd	NCAA 2nd Round
1998–99	Colorado State	33–3	14–0	1st	NCAA Sweet Sixteen
1999–00	Colorado State	23–10	10–4	3rd	WNIT Quarterfinals
2000–01	Colorado State	25–7	10–4	3rd	NCAA 2nd Round
2001–02	Colorado State	24–7	12–2	1st	NCAA 1st Round
Colorado State:		129–33 (.796)	57–13 (.814)		
Louisville (Conference USA) (2003–2005)
2003–04	Louisville	20–10	11–3	T-2nd	WNIT 1st Round
2004–05	Louisville	22–9	11–3	2nd	NCAA 1st Round
Louisville (C-USA):		42–19 (.689)	22–6 (.786)		
Louisville Cardinals (Big East Conference) (2005–2007)
2005–06	Louisville	19–10	10–6	5th	NCAA 1st Round
2006–07	Louisville	27–8	10–6	T-5th	NCAA 2nd Round
Louisville (Big East):		46–18 (.719)	20–12 (.625)		
Louisville (Overall):		88–37 (.704)			
Arkansas (Southeastern Conference) (2007–2014)
2007–08	Arkansas	17–13	2–12	11th	
2008–09	Arkansas	19–14	6–8	8th	WNIT 3rd Round
2009–10	Arkansas	12–18	4–12	T-12th	
2010–11	Arkansas	21–12	6–10	9th	WNIT Quarterfinals
2011–12	Arkansas	24–9	10–6	T-4th	NCAA 2nd Round
2012–13	Arkansas	20–13	6–10	T-8th	WNIT 2nd Round
2013–14	Arkansas	19–11	6–10	T-11th	
Arkansas:		132–90 (.595)	40–68 (.370)		
Total:		349–160 (.686)			
National champion Postseason invitational champion Conference regular season champion Conference regular season and conference tournament champion Division regular season champion Division regular season and conference tournament champion Conference tournament champion
