= Stephany Smith =

American basketball player and coach (born 1965)

Biographical details
- Born: August 10, 1965 (age 61); Brookhaven, Mississippi
- Education: Harding ('88)

Coaching career (HC unless noted)
- 1988–1989: Harding (GA)
- 1989–1993: UAB (Asst.)
- 1993–1997: Middle Tennessee (Asst.)
- 1997–2005: Middle Tennessee
- 2005–2008: Alabama

Head coaching record
- Overall: 180–149 (.547)

Stephany Smith (born August 10, 1965) was the head women's basketball coach at the University of Alabama from 2005 to 2008 and at Middle Tennessee State University from 1997 to 2005.

On March 12, 1997, Lewis Bivens announced his retirement as head coach of the Middle Tennessee State women's basketball team. At the time of his announcement, Smith was promoted to head coach for the 1997–1998 season. During her tenure with the Blue Raiders, Smith led Middle Tennessee to three NCAA Tournament appearances, two Ohio Valley Conference championships and back-to-back Sun Belt Conference championships. She compiled an overall record of 153 wins and 88 losses (153–88) with the Blue Raiders.

In April 2005, Smith was hired to replace Rick Moody as head basketball coach at Alabama, and became only the school's 7th head coach in school history. Smith was 29–90 with four Southeastern Conference wins in three seasons at Alabama. The team ended the 2007–2008 season with a 14-game losing streak, and as a result Smith was removed from her position on March 11, 2008, by athletics director Mal Moore.

== Head coaching record ==
Record table
Season	Team	Overall	Conference	Standing	Postseason
Middle Tennessee (Ohio Valley Conference) (1997–2000)
1997–1998	Middle Tennessee	18–12	11–7	4th	NCAA First Round
1998–1999	Middle Tennessee	18–10	14–4	T–1st	WNIT First Round
1999–2000	Middle Tennessee	18–11	13–5	2nd	
Middle Tennessee (Sun Belt Conference) (2000–2005)
2000–2001	Middle Tennessee	17–13	9–7	3rd East	WNIT First Round
2001–2002	Middle Tennessee	16–13	7–7	3rd East	
2002–2003	Middle Tennessee	18–12	9–5	T–2nd East	
2003–2004	Middle Tennessee	24–8	10–4	T–1st East	NCAA Second Round
2004–2005	Middle Tennessee	24–9	11–3	T–2nd East	NCAA Second Round
Middle Tennessee:		153–88	84–42		
Alabama (Southeastern Conference) (2005–2008)
2005–2006	Alabama	9–19	3–11	11th	
2006–2007	Alabama	10–20	0–14	12th	
2007–2008	Alabama	8–22	1–13	12th	
Alabama:		27–61	4–39		
Total:		180–149 (.547)			
National champion Postseason invitational champion Conference regular season champion Conference regular season and conference tournament champion Division regular season champion Division regular season and conference tournament champion Conference tournament champion
