= Stephanie Smith (disambiguation) =

Stephanie Smith is an American singer-songwriter.

Stephanie Smith may also refer to:

- Stephanie Smith (1947–1969), American artist and the source of the SLE antigen (LSm § Discovery of the Smith antigen)
- Stephanie M. Smith (born 1981), American politician
- Stephanie Murray Smith (born 1987), American television personality and beauty pageant titleholder
- Stephany Smith (born 1965), American basketball coach
