= Pauline Love =

American basketball coach (born 1987)

Current position
- Title: Head coach
- Team: Alabama
- Conference: SEC
- Record: 0–0 (–)

Biographical details
- Born: April 5, 1987 (age 39); Luxora, Arkansas, U.S.

Playing career
- 2006–2007: Jones College
- 2007–2010: Southern Miss

Coaching career (HC unless noted)
- 2012–2013: McNeese (assistant)
- 2013–2017: Southern Miss (assistant)
- 2017–2024: Arkansas (assistant)
- 2024–2025: Alabama (assistant)
- 2025–2026: Oklahoma (Associate HC)
- 2026–present: Alabama

Head coaching record
- Overall: 0–0 (–)

Pauline Love (born April 5, 1987) is an American former basketball player and current head coach for Alabama.

== Playing career ==
Love began her college basketball career at Jones College. During her freshman year she averaged 15.9 points and 13.7 rebounds, and was named All-MACJC and was selected as an NJCAA All-American, the school's first in over a decade. In 2023, she was inducted into the Mississippi Community College Sports Hall of Fame.

Following her freshman season, she transferred to Southern Miss. In three years at Southern Miss, she averaged a career double-double, and earned three first-team All-Conference USA selections. She finished her collegiate career in the top 10 all-time at Southern Miss in nine different categories, and remains among the program’s all-time leaders in scoring average, rebounding average, field goals made and minutes played.

On April 23, 2010, she signed a training camp contract with the Connecticut Sun. She was waived by the Sun on May 6, 2010.

== Coaching career ==
Following her playing career, Love began her coaching career as an assistant coach for McNeese. She then served as an assistant coach at her alma-mater, Southern Miss, from 2013 to 2017.

On May 31, 2017, she was named an assistant coach and recruiting coordinator for Arkansas. In seven seasons with Arkansas, she helped lead the Razorbacks to two NCAA Tournament appearances and signed three McDonald's All-Americans.

On April 19, 2024, she was named an assistant coach and recruiting coordinator for Alabama. During the 2024–25 season, she helped lead the Crimson Tide to a 24–9 record and the second round of the 2025 NCAA tournament.

On May 7, 2025, she was named associate head coach for Oklahoma during the 2025–26 season. In one season with Oklahoma, she helped lead the Sooners to a 26–8 record, and the Sweet Sixteen of the 2026 NCAA tournament.

On April 1, 2026, she was named the head coach for Alabama, replacing Kristy Curry, who left for the South Florida head coaching job.
