= Wisconsin Miss Basketball =

Wisconsin basketball award

Each year the Wisconsin Miss Basketball award is given to the person chosen as the best high school girls basketball player in the U.S. state of Wisconsin.

The award has been given since 1983. Winners are chosen by the Wisconsin Basketball Coaches Association at the time of their annual All-State selections. Most of the award winners have gone on to play at the highest levels of college basketball, and some have gone on to play in the Women's National Basketball Association.

Voting is done by the members of the WBCA. Each member can vote and the winner is determined by the player with the most votes. Coaches may not put votes in for players on their own team. If it is done anyway, the vote is thrown out. The award can only be given to a senior; this has been in effect since 2003 as Mistie Bass won the award 3 years in a row.

== Annual award winners ==
Year	Winner	High school	University	WNBA Draft
2026	Natalie Kussow	Hartland Arrowhead	Minnesota	
2025	Amy Terrian	Pewaukee	Michigan State	
2024	Allie Ziebell	Neenah	UConn	
2023	Kamorea "KK" Arnold	Germantown	UConn	
2022	Kamy Peppler	Hortonville	Milwaukee/Green Bay	
2021	Bailey Butler	Black Hawk	Green Bay	
2020	Lexi Donarski	La Crosse Aquinas	Iowa State/North Carolina	
2019	McKenna Warnock	Monona Grove	Iowa	
2018	Hailey Oskey	Seymour	Green Bay	
2017 (tie)	Estella Moschkau	Edgewood	Stanford/Wisconsin	
2017 (tie)	Sidney Cooks	St. Joseph	Michigan State/Mississippi State/Seton Hall	
2016	Hannah Whitish	Barneveld	Nebraska	
2015	Arike Ogunbowale	Divine Savior Holy Angels	Notre Dame	2019 WNBA draft: 1st Rnd, 5th overall by the Dallas Wings
2014	Gabrielle Ortiz	The Prairie School	Oklahoma	
2013	Samantha Terry	Baraboo	Green Bay	
2012	Nicole Bauman	New Berlin Eisenhower	Wisconsin	
2011	Samantha Logic	Racine Case	Iowa	2015 WNBA draft: 1st Rnd, 10th overall by the Atlanta Dream
2010	Nicole Griffin	Milwaukee Vincent	Oklahoma	
2009	Adrian Ritchie	De Pere	Green Bay	
2008	Rachael Hencke	Grafton	Miami (OH)	
2007	Lin Zastrow	Jefferson	Wisconsin	
2006	Ellie Radke	Monroe	Canisius College	
2005	Erin Monfre	Waukesha South	Marquette	
2004	Jolene Anderson	South Shore	Wisconsin	2008 WNBA draft: 2nd Rnd, 23rd overall by the Connecticut Sun
2003	Meredith Onson	Oshkosh West	Milwaukee	
2002	Mistie Bass	Janesville Parker	Duke	2006 WNBA draft: 2nd Rnd, 21st overall by the Houston Comets
2001	Mistie Bass	Janesville Parker	Duke	2006 WNBA draft: 2nd Rnd, 21st overall by the Houston Comets
2000	Mistie Bass	Janesville Parker	Duke	2006 WNBA draft: 2nd Rnd, 21st overall by the Houston Comets
1999	Candas Smith	Madison West	Wisconsin	
1998	Kelly Auger	Milwaukee Pius XI	Marquette	
1997	LaTonya Sims	Racine Park	Wisconsin	
1996	Kelly Paulus	La Crosse Central	Wisconsin	
1995	Amy Wiersma	Randolph	Wisconsin	
1994	Anna DeForge	Niagara	Nebraska	
1993	Katie Voigt	Lakeland	Wisconsin	
1992	Keisha Anderson	Racine Park	Arizona/Wisconsin	
1991	Lori Goerlitz	Oshkosh North	Marquette	
1990	Darlene Rademaker	Thorp	Wisconsin	
1989	Melissa Smith	D.C. Everest	Tennessee/Northwestern	
1988	Martha Richards	Hudson	Stanford	
1987	Sonja Henning	Racine Horlick	Stanford	1999 WNBA draft: 2nd Rnd, 24th overall by the Houston Comets
1986	Julie Garske	Amherst	Notre Dame	
1985	Heidi Bunek	Milwaukee Pius XI	Notre Dame	
1984	Kelly Byrne	Brookfield East	Northwestern	
1983	Tammy McKay	McFarland	Iowa	

== See also ==
Wisconsin Mr. Basketball Award
