= 1999 Women's National Invitation Tournament =

College basketball postseason tournament

- Teams: 32
- Finals site: Bud Walton Arena, Fayetteville, AR
- Champions: Arkansas (1st title)
- Runner-up: Wisconsin (1st title game)
- Semifinalists: Drake (4th semifinal); Memphis (2nd semifinal)
- Winning coach: Gary Blair (1st title)
- MVP: Lonniya Bragg (Arkansas)
- Attendance: 14,163 (championship)

The 1999 Women's National Invitation Tournament was a single-elimination tournament of 32 NCAA Division I teams that were not selected to participate in the 1999 Women's NCAA tournament. It was the second edition of the postseason Women's National Invitation Tournament (WNIT). The tournament was expanded from 16 teams in 1998 to 32 teams.

The final four of the tournament paired the Wisconsin Badgers against the Memphis Tigers with the Arkansas Razorbacks facing the Drake Bulldogs. Wisconsin beat Memphis 92–73 and Arkansas beat Drake 80–66.

== Bracket ==
Games marked signify overtime.

=== North bracket ===
First Round; March 11
at Wisconsin	80
Indiana State	43
Siena	86
Georgetown	73
Michigan	73
at Western Michigan	64
at Michigan State	78
Akron	65

Second Round; March 14
at Wisconsin	107
Siena	85
at Michigan	68
Michigan State	69

Quarterfinals; March 17
at Wisconsin	70*
Michigan State	69

=== Midwest bracket ===
First Round; March 11
at Kansas State	71
Creighton	60
Arkansas State	78
New Hampshire	65
at Memphis	71
Middle Tennessee	61
Tennessee–Martin	77
Mississippi	67

Second Round; March 14
Kansas State	70
at Arkansas State	83
at Memphis	87
Tennessee–Martin	73

Quarterfinals; March 17
Arkansas State	86
at Memphis	101

=== West bracket ===
First Round; March 11 & 12
at Drake	70
Utah	62
Colorado	70
BYU	53
at New Mexico	81
Papperdine	69
Washington	67
Portland	63

Second Round; March 14
Drake	82
at Colorado	66
at New Mexico	81
Washington	63

Quarterfinals; March 17
Drake	73
at New Mexico	60

=== South bracket ===
First Round; March 11 & 12
at Arkansas	78
Northwestern State	60
Oklahoma	75
Wichita State	67
Baylor	71
Texas–Arlington	60
at Rice	65
Miami	58

Second Round; March 14
at Arkansas	97*
Oklahoma	93
at Baylor	60
Rice	62

Quarterfinals; March 17
at Arkansas	76
Rice	70

=== Semifinals and championship game ===
Semifinals; March 20
N	at Wisconsin	92
MW	Memphis	73
W	Drake	56
S	at Arkansas	80

Finals; March 23
Wisconsin	64
at Arkansas	67

== All-tournament team ==
- Sytia Messer, Arkansas
- Lonniya Bragg, Arkansas (MVP)
- LaTonya Sims, Wisconsin
- Tamara Moore, Wisconsin
- Tammi Blackstone, Drake
- Tamika Whitmore, Memphis

== See also ==
- 1999 National Invitation Tournament
