= James Madison Dukes women's basketball =

2025–26 James Madison Dukes women's basketball team
- University: James Madison University
- Head coach: Sean O'Regan (10th season)
- Location: Harrisonburg, Virginia
- Arena: Atlantic Union Bank Center (capacity: 8,500)
- Conference: Sun Belt Conference (American by 2027–28)
- Nickname: Dukes
- Colors: Purple and gold
- Student section: Electric Zoo

NCAA Division I tournament Sweet Sixteen
- 1986, 1987, 1988, 1991

NCAA Division I tournament appearances
- 1986, 1987, 1988, 1989, 1991, 1996, 2007, 2010, 2011, 2014, 2015, 2016, 2023, 2026

AIAW tournament appearances
- 1975

Conference tournament champions
- CAA: 1986, 1987, 1988, 1989, 2010, 2011, 2014, 2015, 2016; Sun Belt: 2023, 2026

Conference regular-season champions
- CAA: 1986, 1987, 1988, 1989, 1991, 2011, 2014, 2015, 2016, 2018, 2019; Sun Belt: 2023, 2025

Uniforms
Home	Away

The James Madison Dukes women's basketball team is the basketball team that represents James Madison University in Harrisonburg, Virginia, United States. The school's team currently competes in the Sun Belt Conference after previously playing in the Colonial Athletic Association (CAA). The Dukes are led by ninth-year head coach Sean O'Regan.

The Dukes have appeared in the NCAA Division I tournament thirteen times, most recently in 2023. Including Women's National Invitation Tournament (WNIT) berths, the Dukes played in a post-season tournament each season from 2006 through 2019.

== History ==
James Madison's women's basketball program is among the oldest in the nation, having been founded in 1920. The program's first coach, Althea Loose Johnston, coached the team to a 106-33-5 record during her 22-year career. Through the end of the 2022–23 season, the Dukes have compiled a record of 1200-585 (.672), the fourth most wins among all Division I programs, and one of only four with over 1,200 wins.

In the 1986 and 1991 NCAA women's tournaments, they upset the #1 seed (Virginia in the former and Penn State in the latter) while ranked #8 (the lowest seed at the time), being the first team to ever do that on the women's side (the size of the tournament for the former was 40 while the latter had 48 teams). They are one of only three schools to upset a #1 seed while ranked as the lowest seed (the other being Southwest Missouri State in 1992 and Harvard in 1998). They have made the NCAA Tournament in 1986, 1987, 1988, 1989, 1991, 1996, 2007, 2010, 2011, 2014, 2015, 2016, and 2023. They have made the WNIT in 2001, 2006, 2008, 2009, 2012, 2013, 2017, 2018, and 2019, finishing as runner-up in 2012.

== Postseason results ==
=== NCAA Division I ===
The Dukes have appeared in the NCAA Division I women's basketball tournament fourteen times. Their overall record in tournament games is 8–14.

Year	Round	Seed	Opponent	Result
1986	First Round; Second Round; Sweet Sixteen	#8	Providence; Virginia; Western Kentucky	W 55–53; W 71–62; L 72–51
1987	Second Round; Sweet Sixteen	#4	Vanderbilt; Texas	W 68–60; L 91–51
1988	Second Round; Sweet Sixteen	#4	Clemson; Tennessee	W 70–63; L 72–52
1989	First Round; Second Round	#6	Providence; Ohio State	W 94–74; L 81–66
1991	First Round; Second Round; Sweet Sixteen	#8	Kentucky; Penn State; Clemson	W 70–62; W 73–71; L 57–55
1996	First Round	#13	Duke	L 85–53
2007	First Round	#9	Pittsburgh	L 71–61
2010	First Round	#9	Temple	L 65–53
2011	First Round	#11	Oklahoma	L 86–72
2014	First Round; Second Round	#11	Gonzaga; Texas A&M	W 72–63; L 85–69
2015	First Round	#12	Ohio State	L 90–80
2016	First Round	#11	DePaul	L 97–67
2023	First Round	#14	Ohio State	L 80–66
2026	First Round	#12	Kentucky	L 56–71

=== WNIT ===
The Dukes have appeared in the Women's National Invitation Tournament (WNIT) nine times. They have an overall tournament record of 22–9. In the 2012 tournament, the Dukes finished as runners-up to Oklahoma State.

Year	Round	Opponent	Result
2001	First Round; Second Round; Third Round; Quarterfinals	Temple; Georgetown; Mississippi State; Ohio State	W 59–57; W 78–74; W 63–61; L 74–65
2006	First Round	Charlotte	L 70–62
2008	First Round; Second Round; Third Round	Radford; Indiana; Kentucky	W 80–58; W 86–81^{OT} L 84–76
2009	First Round; Second Round	American; Richmond	W 61–59; L 59–57
2012	First Round; Second Round; Third Round; Quarterfinals; Semifinals; Championship	Davidson; Wake Forest; South Florida; Virginia; Syracuse; Oklahoma State	W 64–49; W 84–76^{OT} W 72–45; W 68–59; W 74–71; L 75–68
2013	First Round; Second Round; Third Round; Quarterfinals	North Carolina A&T; NC State; Fordham; Florida	W 77–64; W 72–66; W 77–61; L 85–80
2017	First Round; Second Round; Third Round	Radford; Virginia; Villanova	W 80–59; W 61–55; L 69–67^{OT}
2018	First Round; Second Round; Third Round	ETSU; Radford; West Virginia	W 60–52; W 62–35; L 67–55
2019	First Round; Second Round; Third Round; Quarterfinals; Semifinals	North Carolina A&T; South Florida; Virginia Tech; Georgetown; Northwestern	W 48–37; W 71–54; W 70–66; W 54–44; L 74–69

=== WBIT ===
The Dukes have appeared in the Women's Basketball Invitation Tournament (WBIT) two times. They have an overall tournament record of 2–2.

Year	Round	Opponent	Result
2024	First Round	Stony Brook	L 81–70
2025	First Round; Second Round; Quarterfinals	Davidson; Marquette; Belmont	W 77–50; W 80–76^{OT} L 90–45

=== AIAW Division I ===
The Dukes, then the Madison College Dukes, made one appearance in the AIAW National Division I basketball tournament, with a combined record of 0–2.

Year	Round	Opponent	Result
1975	First Round; Consolation First Round	Queens (NY); William Penn	L, 50–83; L, 40–76
