= Adrian Ritchie =

American basketball player

Personal information
- Born: De Pere, Wisconsin, U.S.
- Listed height: 5 ft 11 in (1.80 m)

Career information
- High school: De Pere (De Pere, Wisconsin)
- College: Green Bay (2009–2013)
- Position: Guard
- Number: 13

Career history
- 2013-2014: Nottingham Wildcats

Career highlights
- Horizon League Tournament MVP (2013); First-team All-Horizon League (2013); Second-team All-Horizon League (2012); Horizon League All-Defensive Team (2013); Wisconsin Miss Basketball (2009)

Adrian Ritchie is a former American basketball player who played collegiately for the Green Bay Phoenix of the Horizon League and professionally for the Nottingham Wildcats.

Ritchie hails from De Pere, Wisconsin and attended De Pere High School, a WIAA Division 1 school. In Adrian's senior year (2009) of her prep basketball career, she averaged 15.4 points, 7.7 rebounds, 5.1 assists, and 3.9 steals and helped lead the team to the WIAA state semifinals. She was unanimously voted to the AP's all-state first team (along with future Green Bay teammate Sarah Eichler) and tabbed Wisconsin Miss Basketball in 2009.

== College career ==
In her 4-year career with the Green Bay Phoenix, Ritchie finished on the school's Division I career top 10 in games played (129), points (1360), three-pointers made (196), free-throw percentage (81.3%), assists (361), and steals (234).

Green Bay's record during Adrian's tenure was 122–16 overall and 84–4 in conference play. Additionally, the team won four regular season titles and three tournament titles in the Horizon League, and earned four NCAA Tournament bids, reaching the second round twice and the Sweet 16 in 2011.

=== Freshman season ===
As a freshman, Ritchie played in all of Green Bay's 33 games off the bench. In her collegiate debut on November 13, 2009, she recorded 12 points and six rebounds at North Dakota. On March 21, 2010, in the first round of the 2010 NCAA Tournament, Adrian scored 14 points in Green Bay's win against Virginia.

=== Sophomore season ===
To open her sophomore season, Ritchie scored 24 points against George Washington on November 13, 2010. She played in 31 games and started the first 16 before but suffered a right knee injury at Cleveland State on January 8, 2011, causing her to miss five games. On March 13, Ritchie scored 18 points on 70% shooting in a 74–63 win over Butler in the Horizon League Tournament final. On March 22, she scored 20 points on 4-of-5 from three-point land in their 2nd round win of the NCAA Tournament against Michigan State 65–56, helping guide the team to their first ever Sweet 16 appearance.

=== Junior season ===
As a junior, Ritchie started in all 33 games averaging 12.3 points and 4.7 rebounds per game by shooting 46% from the field and 84% at the free throw line. On November 26, 2011, she scored 17 points, including the game tying 3-pointer with 0.7 seconds left in regulation, in a 67–62 overtime win over Georgia Tech at the 2011 San Juan Shootout. In a 77–72 overtime win at Youngstown State on February 18, 2012, Adrian poured in career-high 26 points with scoring 9 in the final 35 seconds of the 2nd half helping force OT. At the end of the regular season, she was voted onto the All-Horizon League Second Team. In Green Bay's return to the NCAA Tournament, she scored 15 points in their first round win at Iowa State.

=== Senior season ===
Ahead her senior season, Ritchie was selected to the Horizon League Preseason First Team. She started in all 32 games and led Green Bay in scoring and rebounding with 14.3 points and 5.1 rebounds per game, including a total of 71 made three-pointers. Defensively, Ritchie led the team with 2.6 steals per game, which also ranked 2nd in the league. She notched her first career double-double with 25 points and 10 rebounds against Central Michigan on November 17, 2012. On January 8, 2013, Ritchie collected 7 steals along with 19 points and 4 assists against Detroit Mercy. She recorded a season-high of 8 assists on three occasions, one of those games at Valparaiso on January 26, 2013, where she also logged 15 points and 8 rebounds. On the week of March 11, Ritchie earned League Player of the Week honor for averaging 18 points and shot 8 of 12 on three-pointers in a two-game span, both wins over Loyola and at Milwaukee.

At the end of the regular season, Ritchie was voted onto the All-Horizon League First Team and All-Defensive Team with teammate Sarah Eichler. In their Horizon League tournament title run, she scored a career-high 27 points against Valparaiso in the quarterfinal with 7 made three-pointers, notched 17 points with 7 rebounds against Detroit Mercy in the semis, and 15 points with 9 rebounds in the championship game win against Loyola (Chicago). She was named to the All-Tournament Team and crowned Tournament MVP. Her final game in a Phoenix uniform was in the NCAA Tournament first round, scoring 16 points at LSU.
