= 2011 Women's Basketball Invitational =

American women's college basketball tournament

- Teams: 16
- Champions: UAB

The 2011 Women's Basketball Invitational (WBI) was a single-elimination tournament of 16 National Collegiate Athletic Association (NCAA) Division I teams that did not participate in the 2011 NCAA Division I women's basketball tournament or 2011 Women's National Invitation Tournament. All games were hosted by the higher seed throughout the tournament, unless the higher seed's arena was unavailable. The championship game was hosted by the school with the higher end of the season RPI. The UAB Blazers defeated the Cal State Bakersfield Roadrunners in the final.

== West Region ==
#8 IPFW and #7 South Dakota hosted first round games

1st Round; March 17,18
1	Cleveland State	73
8	IPFW	62
4	Eastern Illinois	64
5	Chicago State	73
2	Idaho	47
7	South Dakota	62
3	Cal State Bakersfield	83
6	Northern Colorado	74

Quarterfinals; March 21
1	Cleveland State	50
5	Chicago State	68
7	South Dakota	64
3	Cal State Bakersfield	90

Semi-finals; March 25
5	Chicago State	92
3	Cal State Bakersfield	93^{OT}

== East Region ==
#5 Morehead State, and #7 Central Arkansas hosted first round games
#3 Elon hosted quarterfinal game
#5 Manhattan hosted semifinal game

1st Round; March 17,18
1	Wright State	82
8	Buffalo	79
4	Sacred Heart	48
5	Manhattan	52
2	UAB	58
7	Central Arkansas	54
3	Elon	103
6	USC Upstate	72

Quarterfinals; March 21
1	Wright State	73
5	Manhattan	75
2	UAB	59
3	Elon	50

Semi-finals; March 25
5	Manhattan	43
2	UAB	62

== WBI Championship Game ==
Hosted by UAB

Championship game March 27
3W	Cal State Bakersfield	60
2E	UAB	68
