= Allie Ziebell =

American basketball player (born 2005)

No. 11 – UConn Huskies
- Position: Guard
- League: Big East Conference

Personal information
- Born: September 21, 2005 (age 21) Neenah, Wisconsin , U.S.
- Listed height: 6 ft 0 in (1.83 m)

Career information
- High school: Neenah (Neenah, Wisconsin)
- College: UConn (2025–present)

Career highlights
- NCAA champion (2025); Wisconsin Miss Basketball (2024); McDonald's All-American (2024); Nike Hoop Summit (2024)
Medals
Women's basketball
Representing the United States
FIBA Under-19 World Cup
Gold medal – first place	2023 Spain	Team

Allie Ziebell (born September 21, 2005) is an American college basketball player for the UConn Huskies of the Big East Conference. She was a five-star recruit and one of the top players in the 2024 class.

== Early life and high school career ==
Ziebell was born to Mark and Stephanie Ziebell and has two older brothers, Alex and Austin. She attended Neenah High School in Neenah, Wisconsin. During her junior year, she averaged 25.5 points, 8.6 rebounds, 4.5 assists, 2.0 steals and 1.1 blocks per game, and was named the Wisconsin Gatorade Player of the Year.

During her senior year, she averaged 27.5 points, 8.7 rebounds, 3.0 assists and 1.6 steals per game, and was named the Wisconsin Gatorade Player of the Year for the second consecutive year. She helped lead Neenah to the WIAA Division 1 state championship game where she scored 35 points in a 59–69 loss to Arrowhead High School. She was also named Wisconsin Miss Basketball, the Associated Press state player of the year and a unanimous first-team all-state selection.

She finished her high school career with 2,819 points, and 859 rebounds. She set a Neenah High School program record, and ranked fourth overall in the state of Wisconsin for career points. She was selected to play in the 2024 McDonald's All-American Girls Game, where she scored eight points, including two three-point field goals. She was rated a five-star recruit, and the No. 7 overall player in the class of 2024 by ESPN. On December 3, 2022, she committed to play college basketball for UConn.

== College career ==
During the 2024–25 season, in her freshman year, she appeared in 33 games off the bench and averaged 2.8 points in 8.2 minutes per game. She made her collegiate debut during the season opener on November 7, 2024, against Boston University and scored six points. She helped UConn win their record 12th national championship.

On November 30, 2025, in a game against Xavier, she scored a then career-high 16 points, including five three pointers, in 16 minutes off the bench. On January 28, 2026, in a game against Xavier, she scored a career-high 34 points in 29 minutes off the bench, setting a program record for points off the bench, surpassing the previous record of 31 points set by Maya Moore in 2007. She recorded ten three-pointers, tying a single-game program record. She became the first UConn player to make ten three-pointers in a game since Katie Lou Samuelson in 2017. She scored ten points the next game against Tennessee on February 1, 2026. She averaged 22.0 points shooting 66.7 percent from the floor, 63.2 percent from three-point land, and 80.0 percent from the foul line in the wins over Xavier and Tennessee. She was subsequently named the Big East Player of the Week for the week ending February 2, 2026. She became the second UConn reserve player to receive the honor, and the first since Shea Ralph in 1998.

== National team career ==
Ziebell represented the United States at the 2023 FIBA Under-19 Women's Basketball World Cup. During the tournament she averaged 6.7 points, 1.7 rebounds and 1.4 assists in seven games, and helped the United States win a gold medal.

== Career statistics ==
Legend
GP	Games played	GS	Games started	MPG	Minutes per game	RPG	Rebounds per game
APG	Assists per game	SPG	Steals per game	BPG	Blocks per game	PPG	Points per game
TO	Turnovers per game	FG%	Field-goal percentage	3P%	3-point field-goal percentage	FT%	Free-throw percentage
**Bold**	Career best	°	League leader

*	Denotes seasons in which Ziebell won an NCAA Championship

=== College ===
Year	Team	GP	GS	MPG	FG%	3P%	FT%	RPG	APG	SPG	BPG	TO	PPG
2024–25*	UConn	33	0	8.2	39.5	34.4	50.0	0.5	0.3	0.2	0.1	0.2	2.8
**Career**		33	0	8.2	39.5	34.4	50.0	0.5	0.3	0.2	0.1	0.2	2.8
Statistics retrieved from Sports-Reference.
