= 2006 Women's National Invitation Tournament =

College basketball postseason tournament

- Teams: 40
- Finals site: Bramlage Coliseum, Manhattan, Kansas
- Champions: Kansas State (1st title)
- Runner-up: Marquette (1st title game)
- Semifinalists: Pittsburgh; Western Kentucky
- Winning coach: Deb Patterson (1st title)
- Attendance: 13,340 (championship game)

The 2006 Women's National Invitation Tournament was a single-elimination tournament of 40 NCAA Division I teams that were not selected to participate in the 2006 Women's NCAA tournament. It was the ninth edition of the postseason Women's National Invitation Tournament and the first to be played with a 40-team field, expanded from 32 the year prior.

== Tournament bracket ==
=== Region 1 ===
*Host • Source

March 15
Jackson State	48
Rice*	64
Western Illinois	37
Illinois*	58

March 16–18
Indiana*	67
Rice	57
Eastern Michigan	57
Indiana State*	79
Green Bay	71
Iowa State* (OT)	79
Illinois	44
Marquette	64

March 20
Indiana*	68
Indiana State	62
Iowa State*	63
Marquette	68

March 24
Indiana	54
Marquette*	57

=== Region 2 ===
*Host • Source

March 16
Northern Iowa	49
Kansas*	59
Cincinnati	75
FIU* (OT)	81

March 18–19
Ole Miss	78
Kansas*	76
Delaware	57
Pittsburgh*	64
Saint Joseph's	42
Virginia*	48
FIU	83
Miami*	95

March 22
Ole Miss	76
Pittsburgh*	85
Virginia*	83
Miami	72

March 24
Pittsburgh*	68
Virginia	56

=== Region 3 ===
*Host • Source

March 15
Stony Brook	65
Hofstra*	92
Belmont	55
Tennessee Tech*	56

March 17–18
Villanova*	71
Hofstra	44
South Carolina	65
Xavier* (OT)	70
James Madison	62
Charlotte*	70
Tennessee Tech	66
Western Kentucky*	83

March 20–21
Villanova*	59
Xavier	47
Charlotte	68
Western Kentucky*	81

March 23
Villanova*	81
Western Kentucky	94

=== Region 4 ===
*Host • Source

March 16
Santa Clara	48
Oregon State*	74
UC Santa Barbara	59
Fresno State*	78

March 16–19
Wyoming*	67
Oregon State	49
Drake	59
Nebraska*	62
Idaho State	68
Kansas State*	88
Fresno State*	77
UNLV	57

March 22
Wyoming*	67
Nebraska	72
Kansas State*	64
Fresno State	61

March 24
Nebraska	63
Kansas State*	77

=== Semifinals and final ===
*Host • Source

March 27–28
R1	Marquette*	77
R2	Pittsburgh	64
R3	Western Kentucky	56
R4	Kansas State* (OT)	57

March 31
R1	Marquette	65
R4	Kansas State*	77

March 31, 2006

Report

Marquette 65, Kansas State 77
Scoring by half: 39–38, 26–39

Bramlage Coliseum
Manhattan, Kansas

== See also ==
- 2006 National Invitation Tournament
