= 2001 Women's National Invitation Tournament =

College basketball postseason tournament

- Teams: 32
- Finals site: University Arena, Albuquerque, New Mexico
- Champions: Ohio State (1st title)
- Runner-up: New Mexico (1st title game)
- Semifinalists: Hawaii (2 semifinal); James Madison (1 semifinal)
- Winning coach: Beth Burns (1 title)
- MVP: Jamie Lewis (Ohio State)
- Attendance: 18,018

The 2001 Women's National Invitation Tournament was a single-elimination tournament of 32 NCAA Division I teams that were not selected to participate in the 2001 Women's NCAA tournament. It was the fourth edition of the postseason Women's National Invitation Tournament (WNIT).

The final four of the tournament paired Hawaii against New Mexico and Ohio State against James Madison. New Mexico beat Hawaii 68–43 and Ohio State took down James Madison 74–65.

== Bracket ==
Visiting teams in first round are listed first. Games marked signify overtime. Source

=== West Regional bracket ===
First Round; March 15 & 16
BYU | 78
Oregon State | 63
Santa Clara | 57
Hawaii | 73
UNLV | 59
Loyola Marymount | 56
North Texas | 67
Oklahoma State | 79

Second Round; March 18 & 19
BYU | 73
at Hawaii | 77*
UNLV | 67
at Oklahoma State | 71

Quarterfinals; March 21
at Hawaii | 51
Oklahoma State | 51

=== South Regional bracket ===
First Round; March 15 & 16
Memphis | 67
Alabama | 77
FIU | 83
Alabama–Birmingham | 96
Pepperdine | 65
Arizona | 85
Houston | 49
New Mexico | 72

Second Round; March 17 & 18
Alabama | 72
at Alabama–Birmingham | 84
Arizona | 62
at New Mexico | 75

Quarterfinals; March 21
Alabama–Birmingham | 55
at New Mexico | 77

=== East Regional bracket ===
First Round; March 14 & 15
Georgetown | 66
George Mason | 56
Temple | 57
James Madison | 59
Georgia Tech | 73
Mississippi State | 77
Wisconsin–Green Bay | 79
Illinois | 96

Second Round; March 17 & 18
Georgetown | 74
at James Madison | 78
Mississippi State | 86
at Illinois | 77

Quarterfinals; March 20
James Madison | 63
at Mississippi State | 61

=== Midwest Regional bracket ===
First Round; March 14 & 16
Mississippi | 92
Western Kentucky | 95
Middle Tennessee | 63
Indiana | 66
Northern Iowa | 73
DePaul | 75*
Cincinnati | 60
Ohio State | 61

Second Round; March 17 & 18
at Western Kentucky | 64
Indiana | 63
DePaul | 62
at Ohio State | 73

Quarterfinals; March 20
at Western Kentucky | 61
Ohio State | 70

=== Semifinals and championship game ===
Semifinals
W | Hawaii | 43
S | at New Mexico | 68
E | James Madison | 65
MW | at Ohio State | 74

Finals
at New Mexico | 61
Ohio State | 62

== All-tournament team ==
- Jame Lewis, Ohio State (MVP)
- Courtney Coleman, Ohio State
- Jordan Adams, New Mexico
- Chelsea Grear, New Mexico
- Janka Gabrielova, Hawaii
- Shanna Price, Wisconsin–Green Bay

== See also ==
- 2001 National Invitation Tournament
