= 2000 Women's National Invitation Tournament =

College basketball postseason tournament

- Teams: 32
- Finals site: Kohl Center, Madison, WI
- Champions: Wisconsin (1st title)
- Runner-up: Florida (2nd title game)
- Semifinalists: Colorado State (1st semifinal); Arkansas (4th semifinal)
- Winning coach: Jane Albright (1st title)
- MVP: Tamara Moore (Wisconsin)
- Attendance: 13,006 (championship)

The 2000 Women's National Invitation Tournament was a single-elimination tournament of 32 NCAA Division I teams that were not selected to participate in the 2000 Women's NCAA tournament. It was the third edition of the postseason Women's National Invitation Tournament (WNIT).

The final four of the tournament paired Arkansas against Florida with the other match-up being Wisconsin and Colorado State. Wisconsin beat Colorado State 78–60 and Florida beat Arkansas 83–62.

== Bracket ==
Games marked signify overtime.

=== North bracket ===
First Round; March 15
at Wisconsin	83
Fairfield	46
DePaul	69
Western Michigan	64
at Michigan State	74
Villanova	62
Cincinnati	76
Pittsburgh	60

Second Round; March 18 & 19
at Wisconsin	82
DePaul	76
Michigan State	88
Cincinnati	83

Quarterfinals; March 22
at Wisconsin	77
Michigan State	45

=== West bracket ===
First Round; March 16
Long Beach State	87
at New Mexico	63
St. Mary's	75
Hawaii	60
at Colorado State	66
Arizona State	54
USC	71
Santa Clara	64

Second Round; March 18
Long Beach State	73
at St. Mary's	48
at Colorado State	66
USC	56

Quarterfinals; March 22
Long Beach State	63
at Colorado State	65

=== Midwest bracket ===
First Round; March 15 & 16
at Arkansas	83
Wichita State	63
at Missouri	84*
Evansville	81
at Georgia Tech	76
Southern Miss	71
Chattanooga	70
Alabama	68

Second Round; March 18
at Arkansas	89
Missouri	88
Georgia Tech	81
at Chattanooga	74

Quarterfinals; March 21
at Arkansas	78
Georgia Tech	67

=== East bracket ===
First Round; March 15 & 16
at Maryland	63
Georgetown	46
Virginia Tech	80
Georgia State	56
Memphis	76
Arkansas State	74
Florida	97
at Dayton	93

Second Round; March 17 & 18
Maryland	68*
at Virginia Tech	60
at Memphis	71
Florida	74

Quarterfinals; March 21
Maryland	57
at Florida	77

=== Semifinals and championship game ===
Semifinals; March 25
N	at Wisconsin	78
W	Colorado State	60
MW	at Arkansas	62
E	Florida	83

Finals; March 29
at Wisconsin	75
Florida	74

== All-tournament team ==
- Tamara Moore, Wisconsin (MVP)
- LaTonya Sims, Wisconsin
- Naomi Mobley, Florida
- Tonya Washington, Florida
- Angie Gordon, Colorado State
- Lonniya Bragg, Arkansas

== See also ==
- 2000 National Invitation Tournament
