= Women's National Invitation Tournament =

Postseason women's college basketball tournament

- Current season, competition or edition: 2026 Women's National Invitation Tournament
- Sport: Basketball
- Founded: 1994 (preseason); 1998 (postseason)
- Founder: Triple Crown Sports
- First season: 1994 (preseason); 1998 (postseason)
- Folded: 2023 (preseason)
- No. of teams: 16 (preseason); 48 (postseason)
- Country: United States
- Last champions: Baylor (preseason); Marshall (postseason)
- Broadcaster: CBS Sports Network
- Related competitions: Women's Basketball Invitation Tournament; Women's Basketball Invitational
- Website: www.womensnit.com

The Women's National Invitation Tournament (WNIT) is a women's national college basketball tournament. It used to feature both a preseason and postseason version played every year, but the preseason tournament was last held in 2023. It is operated in a similar fashion to the men's college National Invitation Tournament (NIT) and NIT Season Tip-Off. Unlike the NIT, the women's tournament is not run by the National Collegiate Athletic Association (NCAA), but is an independent tournament. Triple Crown Sports, a company based in Fort Collins, Colorado that specializes in the promotion of amateur sporting events, created the WNIT in 1994 as a preseason counterpart to the then-current National Women's Invitational Tournament (NWIT). After the NWIT folded in 1996, Triple Crown Sports resurrected the postseason version in 1998 under the NWIT name, but changed the following season to the current name.

== Format ==
=== Preseason ===
The WNIT began in 1994 as a 16-team preseason tournament; the preseason version has remained at that field size throughout its history except for the 2021 event, which was reduced to eight teams due to ongoing COVID-19 issues. Originally, the preseason WNIT was a single-elimination tournament, but since the 2007 edition has used a format which guarantees all participating teams three games. Since it is classified by the NCAA as an "exempt" event, a team can only participate in the preseason WNIT once every four years; additionally, only one team per conference may participate.

The 2021 event involved eight teams divided into four-team pods, one hosted by Kansas State and the other by NC State. Each team played a full round-robin within its pod, followed by Kansas State traveling to NC State for a final game. No overall champion was crowned, and a separate all-tournament team was named for each pod.

In 2022 it featured 4 teams: Colorado, Jackson State, Louisiana and Texas Tech, with Texas Tech the winner.

In 2023 the "tournament" featured just 3 teams and 2 games, with Baylor the only undefeated team of the 3.

There was no preseason WNIT in 2024.

=== Postseason ===
The postseason WNIT started in 1998 as a 16-team tournament. It was doubled to a 32-team tournament in 1999, and once more in 2021. In 2006, competing schools assumed more responsibility, hosting the early rounds of the tourney, and additional expansion was made to forty teams. At that time, schools which won their regular-season conference title but were excluded from the NCAA tournament by having lost their conference tournament were awarded automatic bids. The field was further expanded in 2007 to 48 teams, with automatic bids awarded to each Division I conference. The tournament was expanded to 64 teams in 2021, but will be reduced to 48 from 2024 & hereafter. This most recent change came shortly after the NCAA announced it would create the Women's Basketball Invitation Tournament, a 32-team event whose first edition will be held in 2024.

Through the 2023 edition, the postseason field consisted of 32 automatic berths – one from each conference – and 32 at-large teams. Thirty-two spots in the Postseason WNIT were filled automatically by the best item available in each of the nation's 32 conferences. If a conference's automatic qualifier team declined the WNIT invitation, the conference forfeited that automatic spot, and that selection went into the pool of at-large schools. The remaining 32 team slots in the Postseason WNIT were filled by the top teams available. Any team from a Division I conference, or a Division I independent team, may be considered. Any team considered for an at-large berth must have an overall record of .500 or better. The format won't affect the WNIT's automatic bid to any regular season conference champion not making the 76-team field, since 2027. Bids are announced on the evening of the same day that the NCAA tourney bids are made. Triple Crown Sports has not yet announced the future 48-team format.

The 64-team tournament had 32 first-round games, followed by 16 second-round games, eight third-round games, four quarterfinal games, two semifinal games, and the championship. Since the WNIT is a for-profit tournament, all games are played on the site of the higher bidding team. The national championship game is currently carried on CBS Sports Network. Teams can host in the first round for a guarantee of $6,500 a game and in the second round for $7,500 a game. Early-round pairings are regionalized as much as possible in order to minimize missed class time and travel costs.

Since 2024, this 48-team tourney has 16 games each for the first two rounds, eight third-round games, four quarterfinal games, two semifinal games and the championship.

== Championship history ==
=== Postseason ===
Year	Champion		Runner-up		Venue and city	
1998*	Penn State	59	Baylor	56	Ferrell Center	Waco, Texas
1999	Arkansas	67	Wisconsin	64	Bud Walton Arena	Fayetteville, Arkansas
2000	Wisconsin	75	Florida	74	Kohl Center	Madison, Wisconsin
2001	Ohio State	62	New Mexico	61	University Arena	Albuquerque, New Mexico
2002	Oregon	54	Houston	52	McArthur Court	Eugene, Oregon
2003	Auburn	64	Baylor	63	Ferrell Center	Waco, Texas
2004	Creighton	73	UNLV	52	Omaha Civic Auditorium	Omaha, Nebraska
2005	SW Missouri State	78	West Virginia	70	Hammons Student Center	Springfield, Missouri
2006	Kansas State	77	Marquette	65	Bramlage Coliseum	Manhattan, Kansas
2007	Wyoming	72	Wisconsin	56	Arena-Auditorium	Laramie, Wyoming
2008	Marquette	81	Michigan State	66	Breslin Student Events Center	East Lansing, Michigan
2009	South Florida	75	Kansas	71	Allen Fieldhouse	Lawrence, Kansas
2010	California	73	Miami (FL)	61	Haas Pavilion	Berkeley, California
2011	Toledo	76	USC	68	Savage Arena	Toledo, Ohio
2012	Oklahoma State	75	James Madison	68	Gallagher-Iba Arena	Stillwater, Oklahoma
2013	Drexel	46	Utah	43	Daskalakis Athletic Center	Philadelphia, Pennsylvania
2014	Rutgers	56	UTEP	54	Don Haskins Center	El Paso, Texas
2015	UCLA	62	West Virginia	60	Charleston Civic Center	Charleston, West Virginia
2016	South Dakota	71	Florida Gulf Coast	65	DakotaDome	Vermillion, South Dakota
2017	Michigan	89	Georgia Tech	79	Calihan Hall	Detroit, Michigan
2018	Indiana	65	Virginia Tech	57	Simon Skjodt Assembly Hall	Bloomington, Indiana
2019	Arizona	56	Northwestern	42	McKale Center	Tucson, Arizona
2020	No tournament because of COVID-19 pandemic.					
2021	Rice	71	Ole Miss	58	My Town Movers Fieldhouse	Collierville, Tennessee
2022	South Dakota State	82	Seton Hall	50	Frost Arena	Brookings, South Dakota
2023	Kansas	66	Columbia	59	Allen Fieldhouse	Lawrence, Kansas
2024	Saint Louis	69	Minnesota	50	Sam M. Vadalabene Center	Edwardsville, Illinois
2025	Buffalo	88	Troy	84	Alumni Arena	Amherst, New York
2026	Marshall	66	Illinois State	41	Cam Henderson Center	Huntington, West Virginia

*Was called National Women's Invitational Tournament.

=== Preseason ===
Year	Champion		Runner-up		Final venue and city	
1994 (Note: The event was known at this time as the National Women's Invitational Tournament.)	Washington	79	Texas Tech	75	Lubbock Municipal Coliseum	Lubbock, Texas
1995	Colorado	73	Arkansas	71	Bud Walton Arena	Fayetteville, Arkansas
1996	Louisiana Tech	66	Tennessee	64	Thomas Assembly Center	Ruston, Louisiana
1997	Connecticut	71	Nebraska	61	Gampel Pavilion	Storrs, Connecticut
1998	Colorado State	71	Rutgers	60	Moby Arena	Fort Collins, Colorado
1999	Georgia	85	UC Santa Barbara	64	Assembly Hall	Champaign, Illinois
2000	Louisiana Tech	68	Purdue	63	Mackey Arena	West Lafayette, Indiana
2001	Connecticut	69	Vanderbilt	50	Gampel Pavilion	Storrs, Connecticut
2002	Kansas State	88	Penn State	66	Bramlage Coliseum	Manhattan, Kansas
2003	Texas Tech	73	Rutgers	45	United Spirit Arena	Lubbock, Texas
2004	Notre Dame	66	Ohio State	62	Joyce Center	Notre Dame, Indiana
2005	Connecticut	82	Oklahoma	62	Gampel Pavilion	Storrs, Connecticut
2006	Purdue	69	Baylor	55	Ferrell Center	Waco, Texas
2007	Maryland	75	LSU	62	Comcast Center	College Park, Maryland
2008	North Carolina	80	Oklahoma	79	Lloyd Noble Center	Norman, Oklahoma
2009	Ohio State	93	Oklahoma State	72	Value City Arena	Columbus, Ohio
2010	Purdue	67	DePaul	58	Mackey Arena	West Lafayette, Indiana
2011	Baylor	94	Notre Dame	81	Ferrell Center	Waco, Texas
2012	North Carolina	77	Iowa	64	Carver–Hawkeye Arena	Iowa City, Iowa
2013	Louisville	97^{OT}	Oklahoma	92	Lloyd Noble Center	Norman, Oklahoma
2014	Mississippi State	88	Western Kentucky	77	Humphrey Coliseum	Mississippi State, Mississippi
2015	Baylor	86	DePaul	72	Ferrell Center	Waco, Texas
2016	Notre Dame	71	Washington	60	Joyce Center	Notre Dame, Indiana
2017	Louisville	74	Oregon	61	KFC Yum! Center	Louisville, Kentucky
2018	Iowa State	75	Miami (FL)	52	Hilton Coliseum	Ames, Iowa
2019	Oregon State	80	Missouri State	69	Gill Coliseum	Corvallis, Oregon
2020	No tournament because of COVID-19 pandemic.					
2021	Due to continued COVID-19 issues, no champion was crowned.				Bramlage Coliseum; Reynolds Coliseum (Note: Hosted final game of this season's event.)	Manhattan, Kansas; Raleigh, North Carolina
2022	Texas Tech	64	Louisiana	48	Cajundome	Lafayette, Louisiana
2023	Baylor	66	Utah	59	Ferrell Center	Waco, TX

== See also ==
- NCAA Division I women's basketball tournament
- Women's Basketball Invitation Tournament
- Women's Basketball Invitational
- National Women's Invitational Tournament
