= Colorado State Rams women's basketball =

American college basketball team

2026–27 Colorado State Rams women's basketball team
- University: Colorado State University
- Head coach: Ryun Williams (14th season)
- Location: Fort Collins, Colorado
- Arena: Moby Arena (capacity: 8,745)
- Conference: Pac-12
- Nickname: Rams
- Colors: Green and gold

NCAA Division I tournament Sweet Sixteen
- 1999

NCAA Division I tournament appearances
- 1996, 1998, 1999, 2001, 2002, 2016, 2026

Conference tournament champions
- 2001, 2016, 2026

Conference regular-season champions
- 1996, 2002, 2014, 2015, 2016, 2017

Uniforms
Home	Away	Alternate

The Colorado State Rams women's basketball team represents Colorado State University, located in Fort Collins, in the U.S. state of Colorado, in NCAA Division I basketball competition. They play their home games at the Moby Arena and are members of the Pac-12 Conference. They are led by head coach Ryun Williams.

== History ==
They have made the NCAA Tournament seven times, in 1996, 1998, 1999, 2001, 2002, 2016, and 2026. They made the Sweet Sixteen in 1999 after beating Cal State Northridge 71–59 and Southwest Missouri State 86–70 before losing to UCLA 77–68. They made the second round in 1996, 1998, and 2001. They also have made the WNIT in 2000, 2003, 2004, 2014, 2015, and 2022 with semifinal appearances in 2000 and 2003.

Season	Coach	Record	Conference Record
1974–75	Kathleen Wallace	11–6	n/a
1975–76	Paul Havenar	3–14	n/a
1976–77	Paul Havenar	3–16	0–13 (14th)
1977–78	Ann Matlock	6–13	2–11 (13th)
1978–79	Ann Matlock	7–19	1–12 (14th)
1979–80	Ann Matlock	11–14	2–8
1980–81	Ann Matlock	17–14	5–5
1981–82	Ann Matlock	23–9	6–4
1982–83	Ann Matlock	14–13	5–6 (3rd)
1983–84	Lee Swayze	12–15	4–6 (4th)
1984–85	Lee Swayze	13–15	4–8 (5th)
1985–86	Lee Swayze	7–21	4–8 (4th)
1986–87	Brian Berger	9–19	3–9 (6th)
1987–88	Brian Berger	13–15	3–7 (5th)
1988–89	Brian Berger	13–15	3–7 (T-4th)
1989–90	Brian Berger; Jan Martin	12–16	3–7 (4th)
1990–91	Greg Williams	11–16	4–8 (5th)
1991–92	Greg Williams	8–19	3–11 (7th)
1992–93	Greg Williams	13–14	4–10 (T-6th)
1993–94	Greg Williams	15–14	5–9 (T-5th)
1994–95	Greg Williams	14–13	6–8 (4th)
1995–96	Greg Williams	26–5	12–2 (T-1st)
1996–97	Greg Williams	21–7	12–4 (2nd in Pacific Division)
1997–98	Tom Collen	24–6	11–3 (1st in Mountain Division)
1998–99	Tom Collen	33–3	14–0 (1st in Mountain Division)
1999-00	Tom Collen	23–10	9–5 (T-3rd)
2000–01	Tom Collen	25–7	10–4 (2nd)
2001–02	Tom Collen	24–7	12–2 (1st)
2002–03	Chris Denker	21–13	8–6 (T-3rd)
2003–04	Chris Denker	17–12	8–6 (4th)
2004–05	Chris Denker	15–13	6–8 (6th)
2005–06	Jen Warden	9–20	2–14 (8th)
2006–07	Jen Warden	8–21	3–13 (8th)
2007–08	Jen Warden	4–28	0–16 (9th)
2008–09	Kristen Holt	10–21	4–12 (8th)
2009–10	Kristen Holt	13–17	5–11 (8th)
2010–11	Kristen Holt	14–16	7–9 (4th)
2011–12	Kristen Holt	13–17	9–5 (3rd)
2012–13	Ryun Wiliams	11–19	7–9 (6th)
2013–14	Ryun Wiliams	25–8	15–3 (1st)
2014–15	Ryun Wiliams	23–8	15–3 (1st)
2015–16	Ryun Wiliams	31–2	18–0 (1st)
2016–17	Ryun Wiliams	25–9	15–3 (1st)
2017–18	Ryun Wiliams	21–12	11–7 (T-4th)
2018–19	Ryun Wiliams	8–22	2–16 (11th)
2019–20	Ryun Wiliams	12–18	6–12 (10th)
2020–21	Ryun Wiliams	15–6	11–5 (3rd)
2021–22	Ryun Wiliams	21–12	9–9 (6th)
2022–23	Ryun Wiliams	20–12	12–6 (3rd)
2023–24	Ryun Wiliams	20–11	10–8 (T-4th)
2024-25	Ryun Wiliams	22–10	13–5
2025-26	Ryun Wiliams		15–5

== NCAA tournament results ==
Colorado State has appeared in seven NCAA Tournaments with a record of 5–7.

Year	Seed	Round	Opponent	Result
1996	#8	First Round; Second Round	#9 Nebraska #1 Stanford	W 76–72; L 63–94
1998	#12	First Round; Second Round	#5 Drake #4 Purdue	W 81–75; L 63–77
1999	#2	First Round; Second Round; Sweet Sixteen	#15 Cal State Northridge #7 SW Missouri State #3 UCLA	W 71–59; W 86–70; L 68–77
2001	#9	First Round; Second Round	#8 Maryland #1 Connecticut	W 83–69; L 44–89
2002	#7	First Round	#10 Tulane	L 69–73
2016	#11	First Round	#6 South Florida	L 45–48
2026	#12	First Round	#5 Michigan State	L 62–65

== See also ==
- Colorado State Rams men's basketball
