= Michigan State Spartans women's basketball =

Women's college basketball team

Michigan State Spartans
| 2026–27 Michigan State Spartans women's basketball team |
- University: Michigan State University
- Head coach: Robyn Fralick (3rd season)
- Location: East Lansing, Michigan
- Arena: Breslin Student Events Center (capacity: 16,280)
- Conference: Big Ten
- Nickname: Spartans
- Colors: Green and white

NCAA Division I tournament runner-up
- 2005
Other NCAA Division I tournament results
| Final Four | 2005 |
| Elite Eight | 2005 |
| Sweet Sixteen | 2005, 2006, 2009 |
| Appearances | 1991, 1996, 1997, 2003, 2004, 2005, 2006, 2007, 2009, 2010, 2011, 2012, 2013, 2014, 2016, 2017, 2019, 2021, 2024, 2025, 2026 |

AIAW tournament appearances
- 1977

Conference tournament champions
- 2005

Conference regular-season champions
- 1997, 2005, 2011, 2014

Uniforms
| Home | Away |

The Michigan State Spartans women's basketball team is the intercollegiate women's basketball program representing Michigan State University. The school competes in the Big Ten Conference in Division I of the National Collegiate Athletic Association (NCAA). The Spartans play home basketball games at the Breslin Student Events Center on the university campus in East Lansing, Michigan.

== History ==
The Spartans began play in 1972. In 1991, the Spartans made their first ever NCAA Division I women's basketball tournament, their first postseason appearance since the 1977 AIAW women's basketball tournament. In 2005, the Spartans won 33 games (a school record), advancing all the way to the NCAA Division I women's basketball tournament championship, before losing 84–62 to Baylor. The Spartans have been to 21 NCAA Tournaments in their history, with their most recent trip coming in 2026.

== Coaching history ==
| Coach | Years | Record | Conference record | Conference titles |
| Mikki Baile | 1972–1975 | 32–12 | 0–0 | 0 |
| Dominic Marino | 1975–1976 | 6–16 | 0–0 | 0 |
| Karen Langeland | 1976–2000 | 376–290 | 156–165 | 1 |
| Joanne P. McCallie | 2000–2007 | 149–75 | 68–44 | 1 |
| Suzy Merchant | 2007–2023 | 327–187 | 159-112 | 2 |
| Robyn Fralick | 2023–Present | 55-20 | 23-14 | 0 |
| Totals | | 945–600 | 406–335 | 4 |

== Postseason results ==
=== NCAA Division I ===
The Spartans have made twenty-one appearances in the NCAA Division I women's basketball tournament. Their combined record is 21–21.

| Year | Seed | Round | Opponent | Result |
|---|---|---|---|---|
| 1991 | #4 | Second Round† | #5 Oklahoma State | L 96–94^{(3OT)} |
| 1996 | #9 | First Round; Second Round | #8 UMass #1 Connecticut | W 60–57^{(OT)} L 88–68 |
| 1997 | #8 | First Round; Second Round | #9 Portland #1 North Carolina | W 75–70^{(OT)} L 81–71 |
| 2003 | #8 | First Round | #9 TCU | L 50–47 |
| 2004 | #8 | First Round; Second Round | #9 Arizona #1 Texas | W 72–60; L 80–61 |
| 2005 | #1 | First Round; Second Round; Sweet Sixteen; Elite Eight; Final Four; Championship Game | #16 Alcorn State #8 USC #5 Vanderbilt #2 Stanford #1 Tennessee #2 Baylor | W 73–41; W 61–59; W 76–64; W 76–69; W 68–64; L 84–62 |
| 2006 | #4 | First Round; Second Round; Sweet Sixteen | #13 Wisconsin-Milwaukee #5 Kentucky #1 Duke | W 65–46; W 67–63; L 86–61 |
| 2007 | #5 | First Round; Second Round | #12 Delaware #4 Rutgers | W 69–58; L 70–57 |
| 2009 | #9 | First Round; Second Round; Sweet Sixteen | #8 Middle Tennessee State #1 Duke #4 Iowa State | W 60–59; W 63–49; L 69–68 |
| 2010 | #5 | First Round; Second Round | #12 Bowling Green #4 Kentucky | W 72–62; L 70–52 |
| 2011 | #4 | First Round; Second Round | #13 Northern Iowa #5 Green Bay | W 69–66; L 65–56 |
| 2012 | #10 | First Round | #7 Louisville | L 67–55 |
| 2013 | #5 | First Round; Second Round | #12 Marist #4 Maryland | W 55–47; L 74–49 |
| 2014 | #5 | First Round; Second Round | #12 Hampton #4 North Carolina | W 91–61; L 62–53 |
| 2016 | #4 | First Round; Second Round | #13 Belmont #5 Mississippi State | W 74–60; L 74–72 |
| 2017 | #9 | First Round | #8 Arizona State | L 73–61 |
| 2019 | #9 | First Round; Second Round | #8 Central Michigan #1 Notre Dame | W 89–88; L 91–63 |
| 2021 | #10 | First Round | #7 Iowa State | L 79–72 |
| 2024 | #9 | First Round | #8 North Carolina | L 56–59 |
| 2025 | #7 | First Round; Second Round | #10 Harvard #2 NC State | W 64–50; L 49–83 |
| 2026 | #5 | First Round; Second Round | #12 Colorado State #4 Oklahoma | W 65–62; L 71–77 |

† The Spartans received a bye into the Second Round.

=== WNIT ===
The Spartans have made five appearances in the Women's National Invitation Tournament. Their combined record is 12–5.

| Year | Round | Opponent | Results |
|---|---|---|---|
| 1999 | First Round; Second Round; Quarterfinals | Akron; Michigan; Wisconsin | W 78–65; W 69–68; L 69–70^{OT} |
| 2000 | First Round; Second Round; Quarterfinals | Villanova; Cincinnati; Wisconsin | W 74–62; W 88–83; L 45–77 |
| 2002 | First Round; Second Round; Quarterfinals; Semifinals | DePaul; Illinois; Alabama; Oregon | W 87–76; W 70–57; W 79–61; L 54–65 |
| 2008 | First Round; Second Round; Quarterfinals; Semifinals; Championship Game | Bowling Green; Kansas; Michigan; NC State; Marquette | W 74–66; W 58–54; W 45–40; W 58–57; L 66–81 |
| 2018 | First Round; Second Round; Third Round | Wright State; Toledo; South Dakota | W 81–50; W 68–66; L 83–85^{OT} |

=== AIAW Division I ===
The Spartans made one appearance in the AIAW women's basketball tournament, with a combined record of 0–2.

| Year | Round | Opponent | Result |
|---|---|---|---|
| 1977 | First Round; Consolation First Round | Tennessee; Utah | L, 62–76; L, 62–63 |

== Big Ten Medal of Honor ==
- 1983 – Karen Wells
- 1985 – Kelly Belanger
- 1986 – Julie Polakowski
- 1990 – Eileen Shea
- 2006 – Liz Shimek
- 2010 – Allyssa DeHaan

== Big Ten Coach of the Year ==
- 1988 – Karen Langeland
- 2005 – Joanne P. McCallie
- 2011 – Suzy Merchant
