= LaTonya Sims =

American basketball player

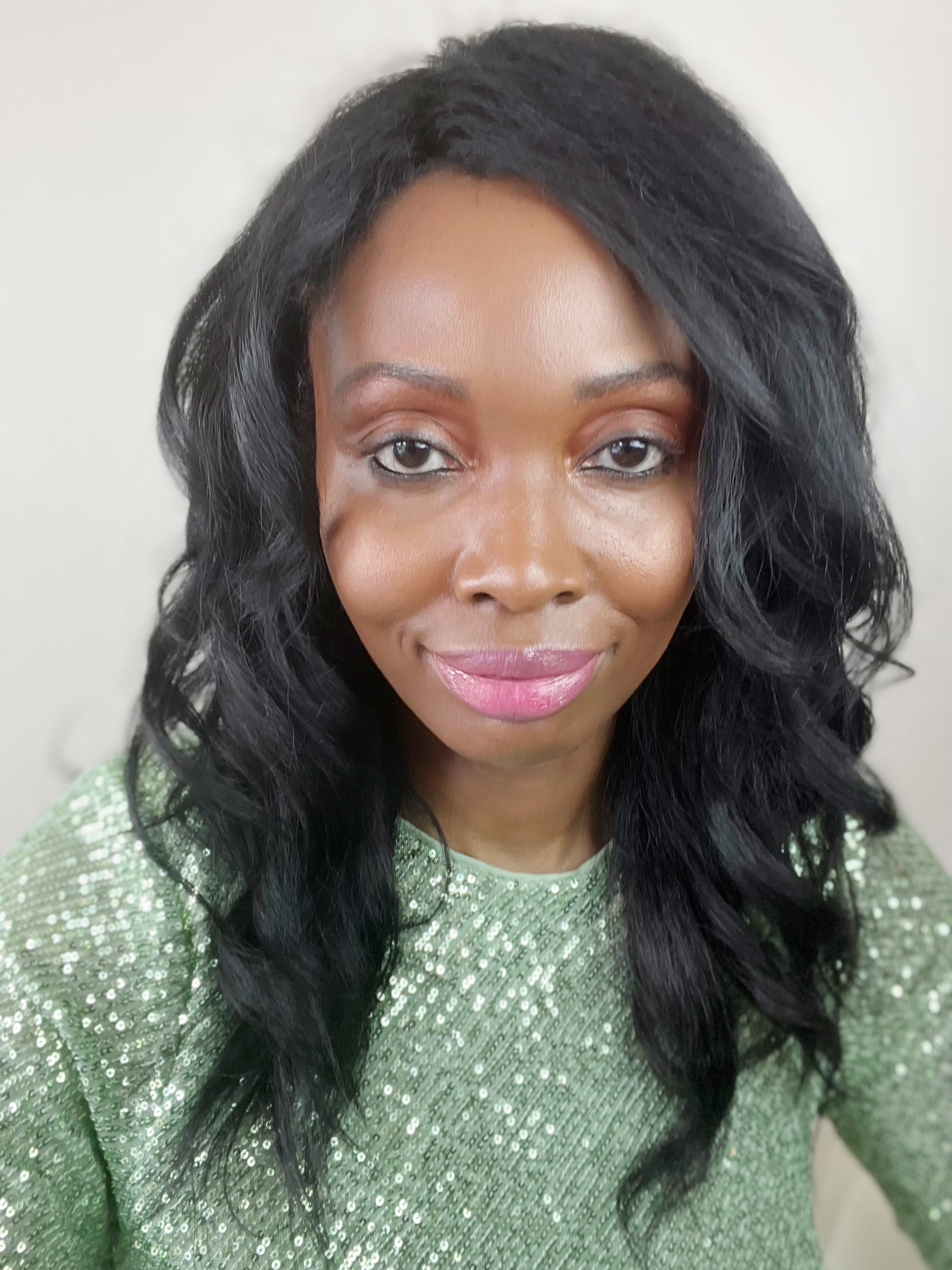

Personal information
- Born: January 8, 1979 (age 47)
- Listed height: 6 ft 3 in (1.91 m)

Career information
- High school: Racine Park High School
- College: Wisconsin
- Position: Forward

Career highlights
- Big Ten Freshman of the Year (1998); Wisconsin Miss Basketball (1997)

LaTonya Sims (Tonya Sims) (born January 8, 1979) is an American former basketball player for the Polish professional basketball league(PLKK) in Europe and the WNBA. She was a back-to-back girls' high school basketball All-American and Wisconsin Gatorade Player of the Year for Racine Park High School in Racine, Wisconsin. In 1997, she was named a first team high school All-American and rated the fifth best prospect in the country, making her the highest rated girls' basketball prospect in Wisconsin to date. She was also named Miss Wisconsin Basketball and went on to play for the University of Wisconsin.

In 2003 she was signed by the Minnesota Lynx, although she did not make the opening day roster.

In 2013, she was inducted into the Racine County sports Hall of Fame.

== Wisconsin statistics ==
Ratios
Year	Team	GP	FG%	3P%	FT%	RBG	APG	BPG	SPG	PPG
1997-98	Wisconsin	31	50.2%	-	65.7%	6.90	0.71	0.61	1.00	12.65
1998-99	Wisconsin	32	48.2%	29.4%	69.5%	6.70	1.03	0.84	1.47	18.00
1999-00	Wisconsin	33	41.9%	27.1%	67.6%	8.36	1.46	0.85	1.58	14.61
2000-01	Wisconsin	28	46.1%	29.0%	76.9%	6.40	2.10	0.60	1.00	14.50
Career		124	46.4%	28.5%	69.4%	7.11	1.30	0.74	1.28	14.98

Totals
Year	Team	GP	FG	FGA	3P	3PA	FT	FTA	REB	A	BK	ST	PTS
1997-98	Wisconsin	31	152	303	0	0	88	134	214	22	19	31	392
1998-99	Wisconsin	32	222	461	10	34	123	177	213	33	27	47	577
1999-00	Wisconsin	33	177	422	13	48	115	170	276	48	28	52	482
2000-01	Wisconsin	28	153	332	20	69	80	104	179	58	18	29	406
Career		124	704	1518	43	151	406	585	882	161	92	159	1857
