= 2002 Women's National Invitation Tournament =

College basketball postseason tournament

- Teams: 32
- Finals site: McArthur Court, Eugene, Oregon
- Champions: Oregon (1st title)
- Runner-up: Houston (1st title game)
- Winning coach: Bev Smith (1st title)
- MVP: Cathrine Kraayeveld (Oregon)
- Attendance: 6,835

The 2002 Women's National Invitation Tournament was a single-elimination tournament of 32 NCAA Division I teams that were not selected to participate in the 2002 Women's NCAA tournament. It was the fifth edition of the postseason Women's National Invitation Tournament (WNIT).

The final four of the tournament paired Houston against Virginia Tech and Michigan State against Oregon. Houston upended Virginia Tech, 77–72, while Oregon beat Michigan State, 65–54.

The final pitted Houston and Oregon. In a close game, Oregon pulled out the victory for their first WNIT Championship, 54–52. Oregon had previously won the National Women's Invitational Tournament (NWIT) title in 1989.

== Bracket ==
Visiting teams in first round are listed first. Source

=== South Regional bracket ===
First Round
Miami (FL)	73
Georgia Tech	64
Rice	65
Houston	67
Valparaiso	62
Michigan	49
Louisville	84
Ball State	95

Second Round
Miami (FL)	76
Houston	83
Valparaiso	77
Ball State	69

Quarterfinals
Houston	61
Valparaiso	53

=== East Regional bracket ===
First Round
Siena	55
Saint Joseph's (PA)	84
Holy Cross	63
Vermont	70
Delaware	71
George Washington	78
North Carolina-Greensboro	45
Virginia Tech	51

Second Round
Saint Joseph's (PA)	55
Vermont	60
George Washington	52
Virginia Tech	68

Quarterfinals
Vermont	48
Virginia Tech	76

=== Midwest Regional bracket ===
First Round
Alabama	68
Missouri	67
Eastern Kentucky	72
Southwest Missouri State	65 (OT)
DePaul	76
Michigan State	87
Western Kentucky	84
Illinois	91

Second Round
Alabama	99
Eastern Kentucky	77
Michigan State	70
Illinois	57

Quarterfinals
Alabama	61
Michigan State	79

=== West Regional bracket ===
First Round
Hawai'i	50
Oregon State	62
Saint Mary's (CA)	61
Oregon	72
Southern California	72
San Francisco	53
North Texas	61
Washington	82

Second Round
Oregon State	48
Oregon	50
Southern California	87
Washington	97

Quarterfinals
Oregon	77
Washington	73

=== Semifinals and championship game ===
Semifinals, March 23, 2002
S	Houston	77
E	Virginia Tech	72
MW	Michigan State	54
W	Oregon	65

Finals, March 27, 2002
Houston	52
Oregon	54

== All-tournament team ==
- Cathrine Kraayeveld, Oregon (MVP)
- Shaquala Williams, Oregon
- Chandi Jones, Houston
- Valerie Muoneke, Houston
- Vnemina Reese, Michigan State
- Ieva Kubliņa, Virginia Tech

== See also ==
- 2002 National Invitation Tournament
