= UAB Blazers women's basketball =

American college basketball team

| 2025–26 UAB Blazers women's basketball team |
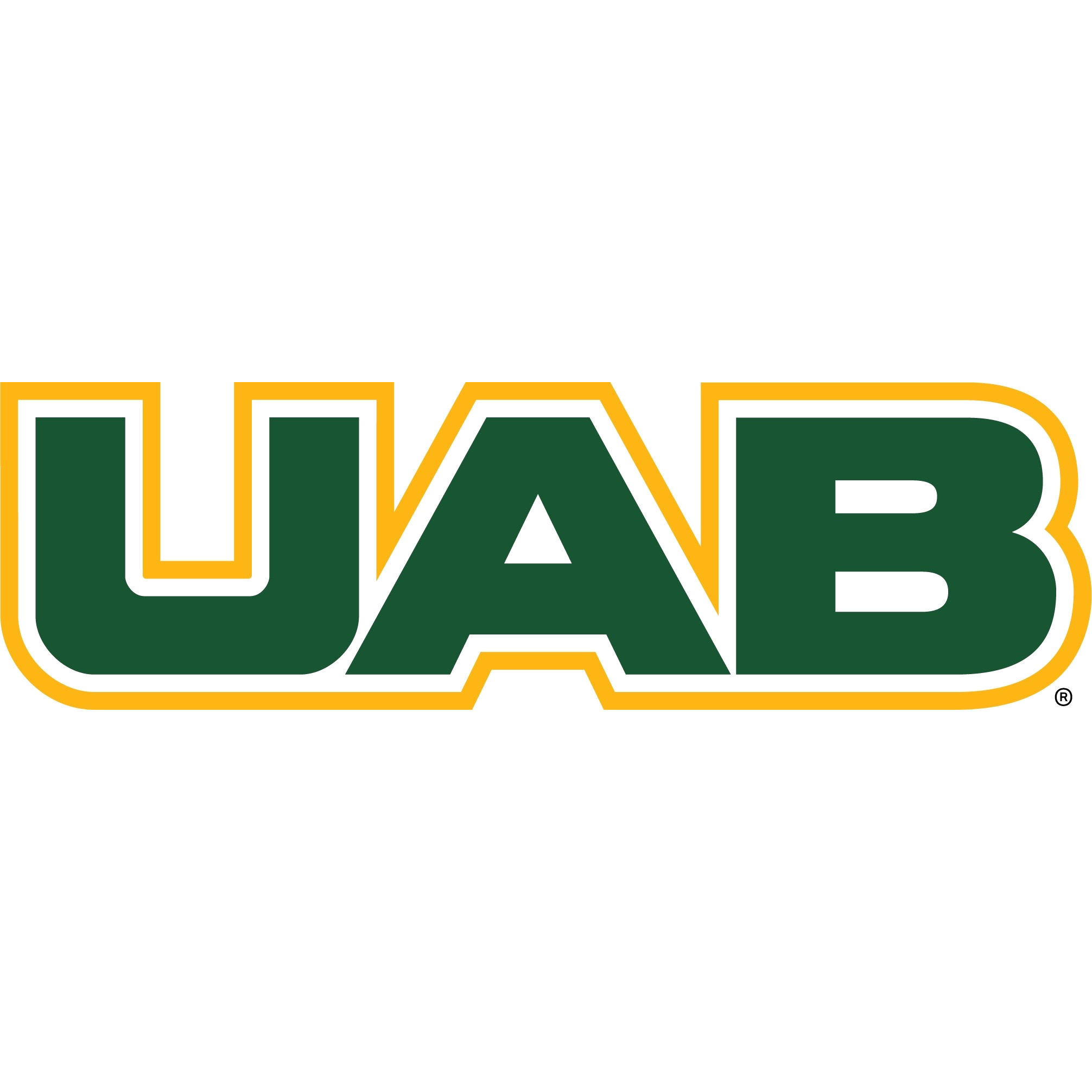
- University: University of Alabama at Birmingham
- Head coach: Randy Norton (13th season)
- Location: Birmingham, Alabama
- Arena: Bartow Arena (capacity: 8,508)
- Conference: The American
- Nickname: Blazers
- Colors: UAB Green and UAB Gold

NCAA Division I tournament Sweet Sixteen
- 2000

NCAA Division I tournament appearances
- 1994, 2000

Conference tournament champions
- 1994

Conference regular-season champions
- 1990, 1991, 1992, 1994, 2018

Uniforms
| Home | Away | Alternate |

The UAB Blazers women's basketball team represents the University of Alabama at Birmingham in women's basketball. The school competes in the American Conference in Division I of the National Collegiate Athletic Association (NCAA). The Blazers play home basketball games at Bartow Arena in Birmingham, Alabama.

== History ==
The UAB Blazers women's basketball program was established in 1978 and played its inaugural season in 1978–79 as an NCAA Division 1 independent. The program's early history was marked by transitions through various head coaches, including Fran Braasch (1978–1981), Avie Bridges (1981–1984), and Bill Ivey (1984–1987). During this formative era, the Blazers competed in the Sun Belt Conference starting in the 1984–85 season.

The program reached new heights during the tenure of Jeannie Milling, the longest-tenured head coach in program history, who led the team from 1987 to 2004. Under Milling, the Blazers won the Great Midwest Conference regular-season championship in 1993-94 and transitioned into Conference USA. The high point of this era occurred in 2000, when the team made its second NCAA Tournament appearance and advanced to the Sweet 16. Throughout the late 20th and early 21st centuries, the team also made multiple appearances in the National Women's Invitational Tournament (NWIT) and Women's National Invitation Tournament (WNIT) postseason tournaments.

Following Milling's departure, Audra Smith took over as head coach from 2004 to 2013. A significant milestone during her tenure was winning the 2011 Women's Basketball Invitational (WBI) championship. Randy Norton was subsequently hired in 2013. Between 2017 and 2020, Norton led the Blazers to three consecutive 20-win seasons—a first for the program—and secured the Conference USA regular-season title in 2017–18. Norton was named the 2017-18 C-USA Coach of the Year for this record-setting campaign.

In 2023, UAB transitioned from Conference USA to the American Conference (AC). In their debut season in the AC, the Blazers finished with a 9–9 conference record. Most recently, the Blazers continued their postseason presence with an appearance in the 2025 WNIT.

== Conference affiliations ==
American logo in UAB's colors

NCAA

- 1978–79 – 1983–84 NCAA Division I Independent
- 1984–85 to 1990–91 – Sun Belt Conference
- 1991–92 to 1994–95 – Great Midwest Conference
- 1995–96 to 2022–23 – Conference USA
- 2023–24 to present – American Conference

== Head Coaches ==
UAB Blazers women's basketball head coaches
| Coach | Seasons | Tenure | Record |
|---|---|---|---|
| Fran Braasch | 3 | 1978–1981 | 58–33 |
| Avie Bridges | 3 | 1981–1984 | 37–44 |
| Bill Ivey | 3 | 1984–1987 | 38–50 |
| Jeannie Milling | 17 | 1987–2004 | 265–230 |
| Audra Smith | 9 | 2004–2013 | 134–145 |
| Randy Norton | 13 (current) | 2013–present | 222–178 |

== Year by year results ==
UAB Blazers women's basketball year-by-year results
| Season | Coach | Overall | Conf. | Postseason |
Independent (1978–1984)
| 1978–79 | Fran Braasch | 15–11 | — | |
| 1979–80 | Fran Braasch | 21–10 | — | |
| 1980–81 | Fran Braasch | 22–12 | — | AIAW Region III |
| 1981–82 | Avie Bridges | 19–6 | — | |
| 1982–83 | Avie Bridges | 14–14 | — | |
| 1983–84 | Avie Bridges | 4–24 | — | |
Sun Belt Conference (1984–1991)
| 1984–85 | Bill Ivey | 14–15 | 3–3 | |
| 1985–86 | Bill Ivey | 12–16 | 3–3 | |
| 1986–87 | Bill Ivey | 12–19 | 1–5 | |
| 1987–88 | Jeannie Milling | 15–14 | 3–3 | |
| 1988–89 | Jeannie Milling | 8–20 | 1–5 | |
| 1989–90 | Jeannie Milling | 19–11 | 4–2 | |
| 1990–91 | Jeannie Milling | 24–8 | 6–0 | NWIT (5th) |
Great Midwest Conference (1991–1995)
| 1991–92 | Jeannie Milling | 24–8 | 8–2 | NWIT (7th) |
| 1992–93 | Jeannie Milling | 9–18 | 4–6 | |
| 1993–94 | Jeannie Milling | 23–6 | 11–0 | NCAA First Round |
| 1994–95 | Jeannie Milling | 19–9 | 6–6 | |
Conference USA (1995–2023)
| 1995–96 | Jeannie Milling | 18–11 | 9–5 | |
| 1996–97 | Jeannie Milling | 14–14 | 5–9 | |
| 1997–98 | Jeannie Milling | 9–19 | 4–12 | |
| 1998–99 | Jeannie Milling | 13–14 | 8–8 | |
| 1999–2000 | Jeannie Milling | 21–13 | 8–8 | NCAA Sweet 16 |
| 2000–01 | Jeannie Milling | 20–11 | 10–6 | WNIT Elite Eight |
| 2001–02 | Jeannie Milling | 12–16 | 3–10 | |
| 2002–03 | Jeannie Milling | 8–19 | 4–10 | |
| 2003–04 | Jeannie Milling | 9–19 | 3–11 | |
| 2004–05 | Audra Smith | 7–21 | 4–10 | |
| 2005–06 | Audra Smith | 14–14 | 7–9 | |
| 2006–07 | Audra Smith | 19–13 | 12–4 | WNIT Second Round |
| 2007–08 | Audra Smith | 14–16 | 10–6 | |
| 2008–09 | Audra Smith | 10–20 | 5–11 | |
| 2009–10 | Audra Smith | 17–15 | 8–8 | |
| 2010–11 | Audra Smith | 20–15 | 7–9 | WBI Champion |
| 2011–12 | Audra Smith | 19–11 | 9–7 | |
| 2012–13 | Audra Smith | 18–13 | 9–7 | WNIT First Round |
| 2013–14 | Randy Norton | 16–15 | 7–9 | |
| 2014–15 | Randy Norton | 18–13 | 11–7 | |
| 2015–16 | Randy Norton | 15–16 | 7–11 | |
| 2016–17 | Randy Norton | 15–15 | 8–10 | |
| 2017–18 | Randy Norton | 27–7 | 13–3 | WNIT Second Round |
| 2018–19 | Randy Norton | 26–7 | 12–4 | WNIT Second Round |
| 2019–20 | Randy Norton | 20–11 | 12–6 | |
| 2020–21 | Randy Norton | 10–13 | 3–11 | |
| 2021–22 | Randy Norton | 16–15 | 8–10 | |
| 2022–23 | Randy Norton | 14–17 | 5–15 | |
American (2023–present)
| 2023–24 | Randy Norton | 18–14 | 9–9 | WNIT First Round |
| 2024–25 | Randy Norton | 16–16 | 7–11 | WNIT First Round |

== Postseason ==
=== NCAA Division I women's basketball tournament ===
The Blazers have appeared in the NCAA Division I women's basketball tournament twice. They have a record of 2-2.

| Year | Round | Opponent | Result |
|---|---|---|---|
| 1994 | First Round | George Washington | L 66–74 |
| 2000 | First Round; Second Round; Sweet Sixteen | Oregon; Mississippi State; Rutgers | W 80–79 (OT); W 78–72; L 45–60 |

== UAB Basketball facilities ==
=== Bartow Arena ===
UAB moved their home games to an on-campus facility starting with the 1988–89 season. Originally known as UAB Arena, the name was officially changed to Bartow Arena on January 25, 1997. The 8,508-seat arena is named after Coach Gene Bartow. In 2026 the arena will undergo a $15.4 Million renovation that will expand the lobby, add a premium club, and provide student seating along the sideline.

=== Basketball Practice Facility ===
UAB's basketball practice facility, housed in a renovated 35,000-square-foot Physical Education Building, serves the men's and women's basketball programs. It includes two full-length practice courts, locker rooms, player lounges, film rooms, workout rooms, and coaching offices.
