= 2011 Women's National Invitation Tournament =

College basketball postseason tournament

- Teams: 64
- Finals site: Savage Arena, Toledo, Ohio
- Champions: Toledo (1st title)
- Runner-up: USC (1st title game)
- Winning coach: Tricia Cullop (1st title)
- MVP: Naama Shafir (Toledo)
- Attendance: 7,301 (championship game)

The 2011 Women's National Invitation Tournament (WNIT) was a single-elimination tournament of 64 National Collegiate Athletic Association (NCAA) Division I teams that were not selected to participate in the 2011 NCAA Division I women's basketball tournament. The tournament was played entirely on campus sites. The highest-ranked team in each conference that did not receive a bid to the NCAA Tournament received an automatic bid to this tournament. The remaining slots were filled by the WNIT Selection Committee. In the championship game, the Toledo Rockets defeated the USC Trojans, 76–68, before a sellout crowd of 7,301 at Savage Arena in Toledo, Ohio. The tournament MVP, Naama Shafir, scored a career-high 40 points to lead the Rockets.

== 2010 Preseason WNIT ==
At the beginning of the season, there is a Preseason WNIT.

=== Round 1 ===
- The games for round one were played on November 12.

==== Bracket 1 ====
- Purdue* 93, Austin Peay 53
- Toledo* 71, St. Francis (PA) 66
- South Dakota State* 87, Utah Valley 38
- Hampton 69, James Madison* 64

==== Bracket 2 ====
- DePaul* 84, Valparaiso 53
- Missouri State* 83, Lamar 60
- Charlotte* 72, Iona 40
- Florida* 77, Central Florida 67

=== Round 2 ===
- The games for round two were played on November 15.

==== Bracket 1 ====
- Purdue* 79, Toledo 66
- South Dakota State* 76, Hampton 64

==== Bracket 2 ====
- DePaul 82, Missouri State* 66
- Florida* 76, Charlotte 70

=== Semifinals and Finals ===
Semifinals; November 17–18
Purdue*	73
South Dakota State	40
DePaul*	74
Florida	73

Finals; November 21
Purdue*	67
DePaul	58

Note: Asterisk denotes home team

=== Consolation Bracket ===
==== Round 1 ====
- The games for Consolation round one were played on Friday, November 19.
  - Central Florida 59, Iona 48
  - James Madison 64, St. Francis (PA) 49
  - Valparaiso 72, Austin Peay 57
  - Lamar 83, Utah Valley 66

==== Round 2 ====
- The games for Consolation round two were played on Saturday, November 20.
  - James Madison 82, Central Florida 78 (OT)
  - Lamar 74, Valparaiso 58
  - St. Francis (PA) 77, Iona 64
  - Austin Peay 73, Utah Valley 69

==== Round 3 ====
- The games for Consolation round three were played on November 19 or 20.
  - Charlotte 64, Hampton 57
  - Missouri State 73, Toledo 69

== 2011 Postseason WNIT ==
The 2011 Women's National Invitation Tournament (WNIT) is a single-elimination tournament of 64 National Collegiate Athletic Association (NCAA) Division I teams that did not participate in the 2010 NCAA Division I women's basketball tournament. The 43rd annual tournament was played from March 16, 2011 to April 2, 2011, entirely on campus sites. The highest-ranked team in each conference that did not receive a bid to the NCAA Tournament received an automatic bid to this tournament. The remaining slots were filled by the WNIT Selection Committee.

== Participants ==
=== Automatic bids ===
Legend	School	Conference
1	UMBC	America East
2	Duquesne	Atlantic 10
3	Boston College	Atlantic Coast
4	Florida Gulf Coast	Atlantic Sun
5	Kansas	Big 12
6	Syracuse	Big East
7	Portland State	Big Sky
8	Liberty	Big South
9	Michigan	Big Ten
10	Cal Poly	Big West
11	Old Dominion	Colonial
12	Rice	Conference USA
13	Butler	Horizon
14	Yale	Ivy League
15	Morgan State	MEAC
16	Loyola-Maryland	Metro Atlantic
17	Toledo	Mid-American
18	Illinois State	Missouri Valley
19	Brigham Young	Mountain West
20	Monmouth	Northeast
21	Tennessee Tech	Ohio Valley
22	Arizona	Pac-10
23	Lehigh	Patriot
24	South Carolina	SEC
25	Appalachian State	Southern
26	Lamar	Southland
27	Oral Roberts	Summit
28	Denver	Sun Belt
29	Southern	SWAC
30	Utah State	WAC
31	Saint Mary's	West Coast

=== At-large bids ===
Legend	School	Conference
1	Alabama	SEC
2	Arkansas	SEC
3	Auburn	SEC
4	California	Pac-10
5	Central Michigan	Mid-American
6	Charlotte	Atlantic 10
7	Colorado	Big 12
8	Creighton	Missouri Valley
9	Delaware	Colonial
10	Drexel	Colonial
11	Eastern Michigan	Mid-American
12	Florida	SEC
13	Kent State	Mid-American
14	Memphis	Conference USA
15	Missouri State	Missouri Valley
16	Nevada	WAC
17	Northwestern	Big Ten
18	Oklahoma State	Big 12
19	Pepperdine	West Coast
20	Richmond	Atlantic 10
21	Southern California	Pac-10
22	St. Bonaventure	Atlantic 10
23	St. Joseph's (PA)	Atlantic 10
24	TCU	Mountain West
25	Tulane	Conference USA
26	UC Riverside	Big West
27	UC Santa Barbara	Big West
28	UNC Wilmington	Colonial
29	VCU	Colonial
30	Virginia	Atlantic Coast
31	Wichita State	Missouri Valley
32	Wisconsin	Big Ten
33	Wyoming	Mountain West

== Brackets ==
Results to date (* by score indicates game went to overtime; H indicates host school):

=== Region 1 ===
First round March 16–18
(H)	Colorado	71
UC Riverside	62
(H)	Cal Poly	60
California	74
(H)	Oklahoma State	81
Pepperdine	74
(H)	Wyoming	79
Portland State	44
(H)	USC	67
UC Santa Barbara	64
(H)	St. Mary's	62
Nevada	65
(H)	Utah State	103
Arizona	95
(H)	BYU	75
Denver	60

Second round March 19–21
(H)	Colorado	81
California	65
Oklahoma State	71
(H)	Wyoming	75
USC	78
(H)	Nevada	59
Utah State	63
(H)	BYU	102

Regional semifinals March 23–24
Colorado	70
(H)	Wyoming	58
USC	62
(H)	BYU	50

Regional finals March 27
(H)	Colorado	70
USC	87

=== Region 2 ===
First round March 16–18
(H)	Wisconsin	68
Butler	48
(H)	Illinois State	72
Central Michigan	59
(H)	Duquesne	64
Kent State	56
(H)	Kansas	79
Wichita State	58
(H)	Missouri State	76
Rice	65
(H)	Arkansas	91
Lamar	65
(H)	Tulane	61
Southern	31
(H)	TCU	74
Oral Roberts	78

Second round March 19–21
(H)	Wisconsin	59
Illinois State	62
Duquesne	80
(H)	Kansas	63
(H)	Missouri State	64
Arkansas	65
Tulane	86
(H)	Oral Roberts	92

Regional semifinals March 23–24
(H)	Illinois State	79
Duquesne	66
Arkansas	78
(H)	Oral Roberts	59

Regional finals March 27
(H)	Illinois State	60
Arkansas	49

=== Region 3 ===
First round March 16–18
(H)	St. Bonaventure	77
Lehigh	43
(H)	Syracuse	77
Monmouth	53
(H)	Eastern Michigan	67
Michigan	59
(H)	Richmond	54
UNC Wilmington	63
(H)	Northwestern	89
Creighton	63
Memphis	69
Alabama	80
(H)	Tennessee Tech	54
Auburn	68
(H)	Toledo	58
Delaware	55

Second round March 19–21
St. Bonaventure	50
(H)	Syracuse	63
Eastern Michigan	63
(H)	UNC Wilmington	54
(H)	Northwestern	70
Alabama	72
Auburn	52
(H)	Toledo	67

Regional semifinals March 23–24
(H)	Syracuse	72
Eastern Michigan	63
Alabama	59
(H)	Toledo	74

Regional finals March 27
Syracuse	68
(H)	Toledo	71*

=== Region 4 ===
First round March 16–18
(H)	Yale	61
Boston College	85
(H)	St. Joseph's	72
VCU	66
(H)	Old Dominion	65
Loyola-Maryland	67
(H)	Virginia	69
Morgan State	56
(H)	Charlotte	62
Liberty	56
(H)	South Carolina	67
Appalachian State	54
(H)	Florida	59
UMBC	47
(H)	Florida Gulf Coast	73
Drexel	67

Second round March 19–21
(H)	Boston College	86
St. Joseph's	59
(H)	Loyola-Maryland	49
Virginia	71
Charlotte	69
(H)	South Carolina	57
Florida	74
(H)	Florida Gulf Coast	69

Regional semifinals March 24
Boston College	48
(H)	Virginia	53
(H)	Charlotte	81*
Florida	77

Regional finals March 26
(H)	Virginia	74
Charlotte	79

=== Semifinals and championship game ===
Played at host schools

Semifinals; March 30
USC	63
(H)	Illinois State	36
Charlotte	60
(H)	Toledo	83

Championship Game; April 2
USC	68
(H)	Toledo	76

== All-tournament team ==
- Naama Shafir, Toledo (MVP)
- Yolanda Richardson, Toledo
- Ashley Corral, USC
- Briana Gilbreath, USC
- Shannon McCallum, Charlotte
- Emily Hanley, Illinois State

== See also ==
- 2011 National Invitation Tournament
