= 2021–22 Hawaii Rainbow Wahine basketball team =

American college basketball season

2021–22 Hawaii Rainbow Wahine basketball

Big West regular season champions; Big West tournament champions

NCAA tournament, first round
- Conference: Big West Conference
- Record: 20–10 (13–3 Big West)
- Head coach: Laura Beeman (10th season)
- Assistant coaches: Alex Delanian; Khalilah Mitchell; Derrick Florence
- Home arena: Stan Sheriff Center (Capacity: 10,300)

2021–22 Big West women's basketball standings
	Conf.				Overall
Team	W		L	PCT	W		L	PCT
Hawaiʻi †	13	–	3	.813	20	–	10	.667
UC Irvine	14	–	4	.778	21	–	12	.636
Long Beach State	12	–	6	.667	19	–	9	.679
UC Riverside	10	–	6	.625	14	–	11	.560
UC San Diego*	10	–	8	.556	13	–	14	.481
UC Santa Barbara	9	–	8	.529	15	–	12	.556
UC Davis	8	–	8	.500	15	–	13	.536
Cal State Fullerton	5	–	12	.294	11	–	18	.379
Cal State Northridge	5	–	12	.294	9	–	19	.321
Cal State Bakersfield	3	–	11	.214	5	–	20	.200
Cal Poly	2	–	13	.133	3	–	22	.120
† 2022 Big West tournament winner * ineligible for the 2022 NCAA tournament due to transition period

The 2021–22 Hawaii Rainbow Wahine basketball team represented the University of Hawaiʻi at Mānoa during the 2021–22 NCAA Division I women's basketball season. The Rainbow Wahine, led by Laura Beeman in her 10th season as head coach, played their home games at SimpliFi Arena at Stan Sheriff Center in Honolulu as a member of the Big West Conference.

The Rainbow Wahine finished the season with a 20–10 record, including a 13–3 mark in Big West conference play that netted them the regular season championship and the top overall seed in the Big West Conference tournament. The team won the conference tournament and the automatic bid to the NCAA tournament, where they lost to Baylor in the first round.

== Previous season ==
The Rainbow Wahine finished the 2020–21 season with an overall record of 9–8 (7–6 in Big West play), to finish fifth in the Big West conference standings. The team beat Cal State Bakersfield in the first round of the Big West Conference tournament 81–67 before losing to the eventual conference champions UC Davis in the semifinal round, 64–52.

== Roster ==
2021–22 Hawaii Rainbow Wahine women's basketball team
Players
Coaches

Pos.	#	Name	Height	Year	Previous school	Hometown
G	1	Kelsie Imai	5 ft 7 in (1.7 m)	Fr	Waiakea HS	Pahoa, HI
G	2	Ashley Thoms (W)	5 ft 7 in (1.7 m)	RS So	Campolindo HS; Weber State	Lafayette, CA
F	11	Kallin Spiller (C)	6 ft 3 in (1.91 m)	GS	Lakeside School (WA); Columbia; Seattle	Seattle, WA
G	13	Hallie Birdsong (W)	5 ft 3 in (1.6 m)	Fr	Kalani HS	Honolulu, HI
F	14	Nnenna Orji	6 ft 2 in (1.88 m)	Fr	Etiwanda HS	Rancho Cucamonga, CA
G	15	Daejah Phillips	5 ft 10 in (1.78 m)	Fr	Centennial HS (NV)	Las Vegas, NV
G	20	McKenna Haire (injured) (C)	5 ft 10 in (1.78 m)	GS	Myers Park HS; Princeton	Charlotte, NC
G	23	Meilani McBee	5 ft 10 in (1.78 m)	Fr	Kennewick HS	Kennewick, WA
G	24	Nae Nae Calhoun (C)	5 ft 5 in (1.65 m)	So	John W. North HS	Riverside, CA
F	25	Amy Atwell (C)	6 ft 0 in (1.83 m)	GS	Penrhos College	South Perth, AUS
G	32	Eva Ongoongotau	5 ft 10 in (1.78 m)	Fr	Pleasant Grove HS (UT)	Pleasant Grove, UT
C	33	Maeve Donnelly (injured)	6 ft 5 in (1.96 m)	Jr	Susquehanna Valley HS; Massachusetts	Vestal, NY
F	34	Jacque David	5 ft 11 in (1.8 m)	Fr	William Chrisman HS	Independence, MO
G	45	Olivia Davies	5 ft 9 in (1.75 m)	RS Fr	Mat-Su Career Tech	Anchorage, Alaska

Head coach

- Laura Beeman (Cal State San Bernardino)

Assistant coach(es)

- Alex Delanian (USC)
- Khalilah Mitchell (LSU)
- Derrick Florence (Morehouse)

Support staff

- Teneshia Ruff (Jacksonville)
  Director of Operations
- Jason Hill (USC)
  Director of Player Development

Legend

- (C) Team captain
- (S) Suspended
- (I) Ineligible
- (W) Walk-on
- Injured
- Current redshirt

Roster
Last update: December 1, 2022

== Schedule and results ==
Date time, TV	Rank^{#}	Opponent^{#}	Result	Record	High points	High rebounds	High assists	Site (attendance) city, state
Exhibition
November 3, 2021; 7:00 p.m.		Hawaii Pacific	W 86–76		23 – Atwell	15 – Phillips	3 – Calhoun	Stan Sheriff Center (457); Honolulu, HI
Regular season
November 9, 2021*; 3:00 p.m.		at San Diego	L 53–86	0–1	20 – Phillips	8 – Spiller	2 – Calhoun	Jenny Craig Pavilion; San Diego, CA
November 11, 2021*; 5:00 p.m.		at USC	L 50–90	0–2	14 – Spiller	10 – Spiller	4 – Imai	Galen Center (1,147); Los Angeles, CA
November 19, 2021*; 7:00 p.m., Spectrum Sports		Portland; Bank of Hawaii Classic	L 77–91	0–3	30 – Atwell	8 – Haire	6 – Calhoun	Stan Sheriff Center (1,123); Honolulu, HI
November 20, 2021*; 5:00 p.m., Spectrum Sports		Portland State; Bank of Hawaii Classic	W 71–68	1–3	29 – Atwell	8 – Spiller	8 – Calhoun	Stan Sheriff Center (1,029); Honolulu, HI
November 26, 2021*; 2:30 p.m.		Eastern Illinois; Rainbow Wahine Showdown	W 71–50	2–3	16 – Atwell	10 – Orji	6 – Phillips	Stan Sheriff Center (981); Honolulu, HI
November 27, 2021*; 2:30 p.m.		Utah; Rainbow Wahine Showdown	L 57–73	2–4	19 – Phillips	5 – Orji	5 – Calhoun	Stan Sheriff Center (1,026); Honolulu, HI
November 28, 2021*; 2:30 p.m.		Gonzaga; Rainbow Wahine Showdown	L 49–68	2–5	16 – Atwell	7 – Phillips	4 – Phillips	Stan Sheriff Center (1,017); Honolulu, HI
December 5, 2021*; 5:00 p.m., Spectrum Sports		Loyola Marymount	W 76–63	3–5	24 – Atwell	6 – Davies	6 – Calhoun	Stan Sheriff Center (1,032); Honolulu, HI
December 21, 2021*; 12:00 p.m.		at UNLV	L 63–70	3–6	28 – Atwell	6 – Atwell	6 – Calhoun	Cox Pavilion (649); Paradise, NV
December 30, 2021; 5:00 p.m.		at UC Riverside	Cancelled due to COVID-19 issues					SRC Arena; Riverside, CA
January 1, 2022; 12:00 p.m.		at UC Davis	Cancelled due to COVID-19 issues					University Credit Union Center; Davis, CA
January 6, 2022; 7:00 p.m.		Long Beach State	Cancelled due to COVID-19 issues					Stan Sheriff Center; Honolulu, HI
January 8, 2022; 7:00 p.m., Spectrum Sports		Cal State Fullerton	W 54–52	4–6 (1–0)	20 – Atwell	12 – Atwell	5 – Imai	Stan Sheriff Center; Honolulu, HI
January 13, 2022; 5:00 p.m., ESPN+		at UC San Diego	L 58–82	4–7 (1–1)	16 – Atwell	12 – Atwell	9 – Imai	RIMAC Arena; La Jolla, CA
January 15, 2022; 2:00 p.m., ESPN+		at UC Irvine	W 77–73	5–7 (2–1)	20 – Atwell	8 – Phillips	3 – 3 players	Bren Events Center (290); Irvine, CA
January 20, 2022*; 7:00 p.m., Spectrum Sports		Cal State Bakersfield	W 69–52	6–7	16 – Phillips	9 – Phillips	5 – Phillips	Stan Sheriff Center (892); Honolulu, HI
January 22, 2022; 7:00 p.m., Spectrum Sports		Cal State Bakersfield	W 73–66	7–7 (3–1)	33 – Atwell	10 – Atwell	4 – Atwell	Stan Sheriff Center (974); Honolulu, HI
January 27, 2022; 5:00 p.m., ESPN+		at UC Santa Barbara	L 51–65	7–8 (3–2)	11 – David	5 – Phillips	4 – Calhoun	Thunderdome (150); Santa Barbara, CA
January 29, 2022; 12:00 p.m., ESPN+		at Cal State Northridge	W 76–67	8–8 (4–2)	15 – 2 players	6 – Phillips	2 – 4 players	Matadome (120); Northridge, CA
February 3, 2022; 7:00 p.m., Spectrum Sports		UC Davis	W 57–50	9–8 (5–2)	17 – Davies	12 – Spiller	2 – 2 players	Stan Sheriff Center (1,126); Honolulu, HI
February 5, 2022; 6:00 p.m., Spectrum Sports		UC Riverside	W 76–57	10–8 (6–2)	21 – Atwell	8 – Atwell	3 – Davies	Stan Sheriff Center (1,079); Honolulu, HI
February 10, 2022; 5:00 p.m.		at Cal State Fullerton	W 55–46	11–8 (7–2)	18 – Atwell	12 – Spiller	5 – Davies	Titan Gym (214); Fullerton, CA
February 11, 2022; 2:00 p.m., ESPN+		at Long Beach State	W 72–64	12–8 (8–2)	25 – Atwell	12 – Atwell	5 – Phillips	Walter Pyramid (554); Long Beach, CA
February 17, 2022; 7:00 p.m., Spectrum Sports		UC San Diego	L 60–62	12–9 (8–3)	24 – Phillips	8 – Atwell	3 – Phillips	Stan Sheriff Center (1,121); Honolulu, HI
February 19, 2022; 3:30 p.m., Spectrum Sports		UC Irvine	W 67–57	13–9 (9–3)	25 – Atwell	13 – Atwell	6 – Phillips	Stan Sheriff Center (1,171); Honolulu, HI
February 24, 2022; 5:00 p.m., ESPN+		at No. Cal State Bakersfield	W 75–61	14–9 (10–3)	19 – 2 players	7 – 2 players	3 – Imai	Icardo Center (421); Bakersfield, CA
February 26, 2022; 12:00 p.m.		at Cal Poly	W 73–49	15–9 (11–3)	22 – Phillips	7 – Phillips	6 – Imai	Mott Athletics Center (681); San Luis Obispo, CA
March 3, 2022; 7:00 p.m., Spectrum Sports		Cal State Northridge	W 75–62	16–9 (12–3)	26 – Atwell	7 – Phillips	5 – Phillips	Stan Sheriff Center (1,276); Honolulu, HI
March 5, 2022; 7:00 p.m., Spectrum Sports		UC Santa Barbara	W 58–52	17–9 (13–3)	10 – Davies	11 – Atwell	5 – Atwell	Stan Sheriff Center (1,607); Honolulu, HI
Big West tournament
March 9, 2022; 10:00 a.m., ESPN+	(1)	vs. (9) Cal State Bakersfield; Quarterfinals	W 48–47	18–9	11 – Davies	7 – David	3 – Davies	Dollar Loan Center; Henderson, NV
March 11, 2022; 10:00 a.m., ESPN+	(1)	vs. (4) UC Riverside; Semifinals	W 69–55	19–10	22 – Atwell	13 – Atwell	4 – Davies	Dollar Loan Center; Henderson, NV
March 12, 2022; 3:00 p.m., ESPN+	(1)	vs. (2) UC Irvine; Championship	W 59–48	20–9	14 – Davies	10 – Phillips	5 – Phillips	Dollar Loan Center; Henderson, NV
NCAA tournament
March 18, 2022*; 10:00 a.m., ESPN2	(15 W)	at (2 W) No. 7 Baylor; First Round	L 49–89	20–10	29 – Atwell	13 – Atwell	3 – Phillips	Ferrell Center; Waco, TX
*Non-conference game. ^{#}Rankings from AP Poll. (#) Tournament seedings in parentheses. All times are in Hawaii–Aleutian Time. Source:
