= Amy Atwell =

Australian basketball player (born 1998)

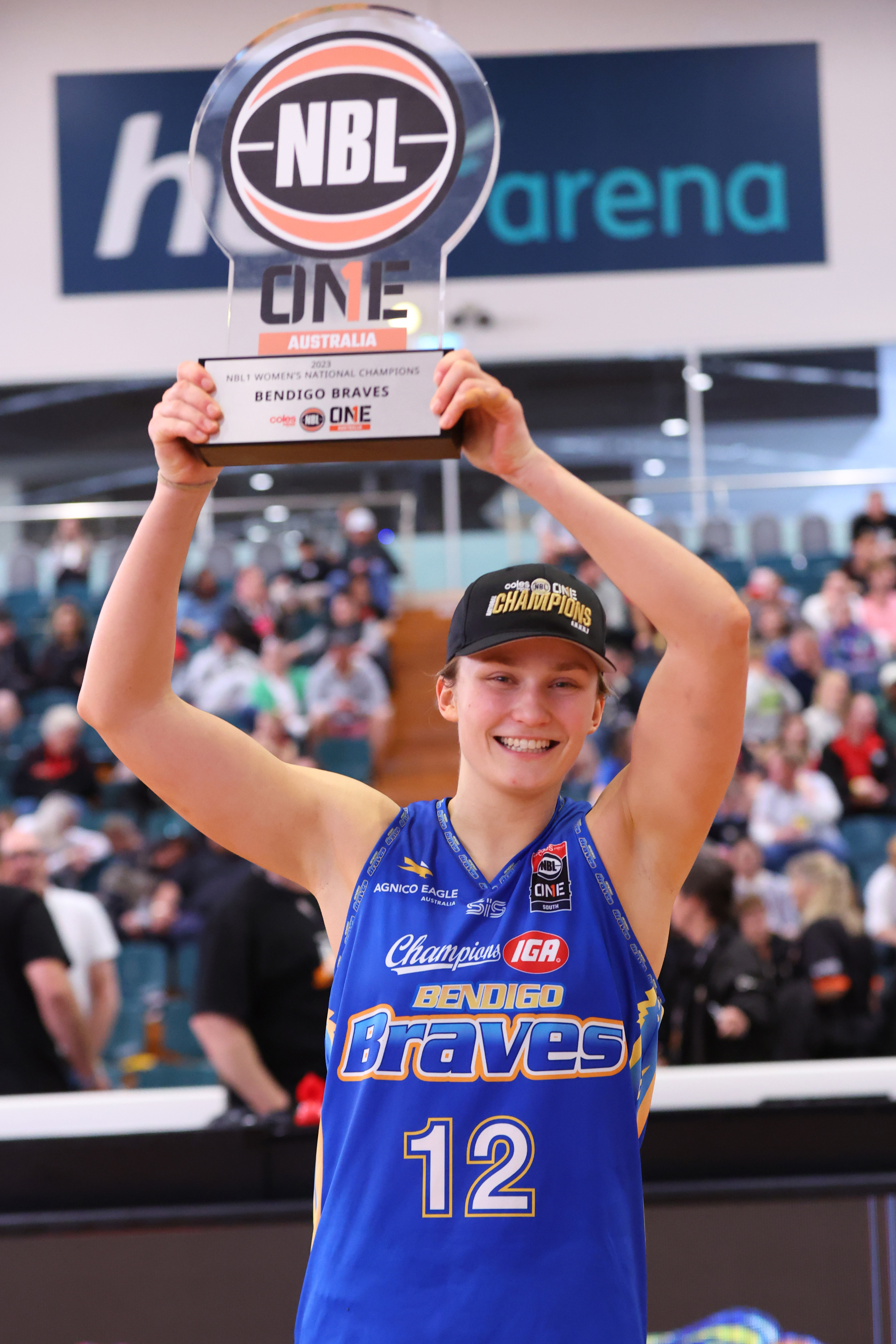
- Atwell with the Bendigo Braves in 2023

No. 25 – Rockingham Flames
- Position: Shooting guard
- League: NBL1 West

Personal information
- Born: 30 June 1998 (age 28) Perth, Western Australia, Australia
- Listed height: 6 ft 0 in (1.83 m)
- Listed weight: 165 lb (75 kg)

Career information
- High school: Penrhos College (Perth, Western Australia)
- College: Hawaii (2017–2022)
- WNBA draft: 2022: 3rd round, 27th overall pick
- Drafted by: Los Angeles Sparks
- Playing career: 2022–present

Career history
- 2022: Los Angeles Sparks
- 2022–2026: Perth Lynx
- 2023–2024: Bendigo Braves
- 2024: Phoenix Mercury
- 2026–present: Rockingham Flames
- 2026–present: University of Canberra Capitals

Career highlights
- All-WNBL Second Team (2024); NBL1 National champion (2023); NBL1 National Finals All-Star Five (2023); NBL1 South champion (2023); NBL1 South Grand Final MVP (2023); NBL1 South All-Star Five (2024); Big West Player of the Year (2022); Big West tournament MVP (2022); First-team All-Big West (2022); Second-team All-Big West (2021); Big West Best Sixth Player (2020)
- Stats at WNBA.com
- Stats at Basketball Reference
Medals
Representing Australia
Women's basketball
Olympic Games
| Bronze medal – third place | 2024 Paris | Team |
Asia Cup
| Bronze medal – third place | 2023 Australia |
Women's 3x3 basketball
FIBA 3x3 World Cup
| Silver medal – second place | 2026 Warsaw | Team |
Asia Cup
| Gold medal – first place | 2026 Singapore | Team |
Commonwealth Games
| Gold medal – first place | 2026 Glasgow | Team |

Amy Atwell (born 30 June 1998) is an Australian professional basketball player for the Rockingham Flames of the NBL1 West. She is also contracted with the University of Canberra Capitals of the Women's National Basketball League (WNBL). She played college basketball for the Hawaii Rainbow Wahine, where she won the Big West Conference Player of the Year in 2022. She had brief stints in the Women's National Basketball Association (WNBA) in 2022 with the Los Angeles Sparks and in 2024 with the Phoenix Mercury. Between 2022 and 2026, she played for the Perth Lynx of the WNBL.

== Early life ==
Atwell was born in Perth, Western Australia. She attended Penrhos College and played basketball for the Willetton Tigers as a junior. She also played softball growing up.

== College career ==
Atwell moved to the United States in 2016 to play college basketball for the Hawaii Rainbow Wahine. After redshirting the 2016–17 season due to injury, she debuted in the 2017–18 season. In 2019–20, she was named Big West Conference Best Sixth Player and Big West Conference Honorable Mention. In 2020–21, she was named second-team All-Big West. In 2021–22, she was named Big West Player of the Year and first-team All-Big West. She became the 23rd member of the 1,000 point club for the Rainbow Wahine and finished No. 1 in made 3-pointers with 205. She also helped the Rainbow Wahine win the 2022 Big West tournament behind her tournament MVP performance.

== Professional career ==
=== WNBA ===
Atwell was selected by the Los Angeles Sparks in the third round (27th overall) of the 2022 WNBA draft. She made the opening night roster and made her first career start against the Chicago Sky on 6 May. After appearing in four games, Atwell was waived by the Sparks on 7 June 2022.

In April 2024, Atwell received a training camp invite from the Phoenix Mercury of the WNBA. She returned to the Mercury in September 2024 on a seven-day contract, debuting against the Washington Mystics and scoring two points in four minutes in a 13-point loss. Her contract was extended by the Mercury for another seven days and then for the remainder of the season ahead of the WNBA playoffs.

In February 2025, Atwell was signed by the Mercury to a training camp deal, but was quickly waived prior to it starting.

=== WNBL and NBL1 ===
On 4 June 2022, Atwell signed with the Perth Lynx for the 2022–23 WNBL season. She had a 27-point game in January 2023 and averaged 13 points, 4.8 rebounds and 1.3 assists for the season.

Atwell joined the Bendigo Braves of the NBL1 South for the 2023 season. She led the Braves to the NBL1 South championship behind her grand final MVP performance of 36 points, eight rebounds and two assists in an 83–78 win over the Waverley Falcons. Atwell and the Braves went on to win the NBL1 National championship. She was named to the NBL1 National Finals All-Star Five.

On 19 May 2023, Atwell re-signed with the Lynx for the 2023–24 WNBL season. She was named team vice captain. On 27 December 2023, she had a career-high 36 points and seven 3-pointers in a 98–90 win over the UC Capitals. In game one of the Lynx's grand final series against the Southside Flyers, Atwell had a game-high 30 points and a career-high nine 3-pointers in a 101–79 win. They went on to lose the series 2–1.

Atwell re-joined the Bendigo Braves for the 2024 NBL1 South season. In 12 games, she averaged 27.17 points, 5.08 rebounds, 1.92 assists and 1.83 steals per game.

On 22 July 2024, Atwell re-signed with the Lynx for the 2024–25 WNBL season. She was named co-captain of the team alongside Anneli Maley. Atwell missed the first seven games of the season with a knee injury, returning in early December. She underwent post-season surgery, which saw Atwell spend the winter recovering.

On 9 July 2025, Atwell re-signed with the Lynx for the 2025–26 WNBL season, returning as co-captain for a second season. She helped the Lynx reach the WNBL grand final series, where they lost 2–0 to the Townsville Fire.

Atwell joined the Rockingham Flames of the NBL1 West for the 2026 season. In the preliminary final, the Flames lost 90–86 in overtime to the Warwick Senators despite 47 points from Atwell.

On 14 May 2026, Atwell signed with the University of Canberra Capitals for the 2026–27 WNBL season.

== National team career ==
In July 2024, Atwell was named in the Australian Opals' squad for the Paris Olympics as a replacement for Rebecca Allen. She earned a bronze medal in the competition.

In April 2026, Atwell played for the Australia women's national 3x3 team at the 2026 FIBA 3x3 Asia Cup, helping the team win the gold medal. In June 2026, she played for the Gangurrus at the FIBA 3x3 World Cup, where she won a silver medal and was named to the all-tournament team. Later that month, she was selected for the Australian 3x3 team for the 2026 Commonwealth Games in Glasgow. The team went on to win the gold medal.

== Career statistics ==
=== WNBA ===
Legend
| GP | Games played | GS | Games started | MPG | Minutes per game | RPG | Rebounds per game |
| APG | Assists per game | SPG | Steals per game | BPG | Blocks per game | PPG | Points per game |
| TO | Turnovers per game | FG% | Field-goal percentage | 3P% | 3-point field-goal percentage | FT% | Free-throw percentage |
| **Bold** | Career best | ° | League leader |

==== Regular season ====
Stats current through end of 2024 season

WNBA regular season statistics
| Year | Team | GP | GS | MPG | FG% | 3P% | FT% | RPG | APG | SPG | BPG | TO | PPG |
|---|---|---|---|---|---|---|---|---|---|---|---|---|---|
| 2022 | Los Angeles | 4 | **1** | 8.0 | .111 | .167 | .000 | 0.5 | 0.5 | 0.0 | 0.0 | 0.5 | 0.8 |
| 2023 | Did not appear in league | | | | | | | | | | | | |
| 2024 | Phoenix | **6** | 0 | **9.8** | **.267** | **.231** | **.800** | **1.0** | **1.0** | 0.0 | **0.2** | **0.3** | **2.5** |
| **Career** | 2 years, 2 teams | 10 | 1 | 9.1 | .208 | .211 | .800 | 0.8 | 0.8 | 0.0 | 0.1 | 0.4 | 1.8 |

==== Playoffs ====
WNBA playoff statistics
| Year | Team | GP | GS | MPG | FG% | 3P% | FT% | RPG | APG | SPG | BPG | TO | PPG |
|---|---|---|---|---|---|---|---|---|---|---|---|---|---|
| 2024 | Phoenix | 1 | 0 | 1.0 | — | — | — | 0.0 | 0.0 | 0.0 | 0.0 | 0.0 | 0.0 |
| **Career** | 1 year, 1 team | 1 | 0 | 1.0 | — | — | — | 0.0 | 0.0 | 0.0 | 0.0 | 0.0 | 0.0 |

=== College ===
| Year | Team | GP | Points | FG% | 3P% | FT% | RPG | APG | SPG | BPG | PPG |
|---|---|---|---|---|---|---|---|---|---|---|---|
| 2017–18 | Hawaii | 24 | 102 | .477 | .281 | .692 | 2.4 | 0.5 | 0.4 | 0.1 | 4.3 |
| 2018–19 | Hawaii | 28 | 133 | .429 | .368 | .833 | 2.4 | 0.6 | 0.6 | 0.1 | 4.8 |
| 2019–20 | Hawaii | 27 | 286 | .476 | .453 | .719 | 4.9 | 0.7 | 0.5 | 0.3 | 10.6 |
| 2020–21 | Hawaii | 17 | 215 | .383 | .319 | .750 | 5.9 | 0.6 | 0.7 | 0.4 | 12.6 |
| 2021–22 | Hawaii | 30 | 534 | .438 | .380 | .859 | 6.9 | 1.0 | 1.5 | 0.6 | 17.8 |
| Career | | 126 | 1270 | .438 | .380 | .806 | 4.5 | 0.7 | 0.7 | 0.3 | 10.1 |

== Personal life ==
Atwell is the daughter of Ray and Shelley Atwell. She has an older sister, Hayley, and a younger brother, Ryan. Her grandfather is former Australian rules football player Mal Atwell.

As of February 2026, Atwell's partner is fellow basketball player and Perth Lynx teammate Ally Wilson.
