= List of Hawaii Rainbow Wahine head basketball coaches =

The Hawaii Rainbow Wahine basketball program is a college basketball team that represents the University of Hawaiʻi at Mānoa. They play at the Division I level of the National Collegiate Athletic Association (NCAA).

Hawaii's current head coach is Laura Beeman who was hired in 2012. She is the second all-time winningest coach in program history after Vince Goo who coached from 1987 until 2004.

== Key ==
General
#	Number of coaches (Note: A running total of the number of coaches of the Rainbow Wahine. Thus, any coach who has two or more separate terms as head coach is counted only once.)
CCs	Conference championships
*	Conference tournament champion

Overall
GC	Games coached
OW	Wins
OL	Losses
OT	Ties
O%	Winning percentage

Conference
CW	Wins
CL	Losses
C%	Winning percentage

Post-season
PW	Wins
PL	Losses

== Coaches ==
Statistics are correct as of the end of the 2023–24 NCAA Division I women's basketball season.

#	Name	Term	GC	OW	OL	O%	CW	CL	C%	PW	PL	CCs	Awards
1	Patsy Dung	1974–1979	51	31	20	.608	—	—	—	—	—	—	—
2	Milo Griffin	1979–1982	74	25	49	.338	—	—	—	—	—	—	—
3	Jerry Busone	1982–1984	58	35	23	.603	—	—	—	—	—	—	—
4	Bill Nepfel	1984–1987	88	53	35	.602	20	20	.500	—	—	—	—
5	Vince Goo	1987–2004	450	334	116	.742	194	96	.669	7	9	2 – (1993, 1994)	Big West Coach of the Year (1989, 1993, 1994)
6	Jim Bolla	2004–2009	144	64	80	.444	35	47	.427	—	—	—	—
7	Dana Takahara-Dias	2009–2012	90	32	58	.356	17	27	.386	—	—	—	—
8	Laura Beeman	2012–present	359	222	169	.568	146	73	.667	0	9	4 – (2015, 2022, 2024, 2025)	Big West Coach of the Year (2015, 2022, 2024, 2025)

== See also ==
- List of Hawaii Rainbow Warriors head basketball coaches
