= 2016 Big West Conference women's basketball tournament =

- Classification: Division I
- Season: 2015–16
- Teams: 8
- Site: Bren Events Center; Honda Center; Irvine, CA; Anaheim, CA
- Champions: Hawai'i (2nd title)
- Winning coach: Laura Beeman (1st title)
- MVP: Ashleigh Karaitiana (Hawaii)
- Television: ESPN3; FS PRIME/FCS Pacific

2015–16 Big West women's basketball standings
	Conf.				Overall
Team	W		L	PCT	W		L	PCT
UC Riverside	16	–	0	1.000	23	–	9	.719
Long Beach State	12	–	4	.750	24	–	9	.727
Hawaii †	12	–	4	.750	21	–	11	.656
UC Davis	10	–	6	.625	19	–	12	.613
UC Santa Barbara	8	–	8	.500	12	–	20	.375
Cal Poly	7	–	9	.438	15	–	16	.484
Cal State Northridge	5	–	11	.313	7	–	24	.226
UC Irvine	1	–	15	.063	4	–	27	.129
Cal State Fullerton	1	–	15	.063	3	–	27	.100
† 2016 Big West tournament winner As of March 19, 2016; Rankings from AP poll

The 2016 Big West Conference women's basketball tournament took place March 8–12, 2016. The first two rounds occurred at Bren Events Center while the semifinals and championship were at the Honda Center in Anaheim, California. The winner of the tournament received the conference's automatic bid to the 2016 NCAA Women's Division I Basketball Tournament.

CSUN were the defending champions, but were eliminated by Cal Poly in the first round. The tournament was won by Hawai'i, who defeated UC Davis in the championship game.

== Format ==
The top eight teams qualified for the 2016 Big West tournament. Seeds 1 and 2 received a double-bye while seeds 3 and 4 received a single bye. The first round featured 5 vs. 8 and 6 vs. 7. The lowest seed from round 1 moved on to play seed 3 in the quarterfinals while the other winner moved on to play seed 4 in the quarterfinals. The semifinals once again had the lowest seed from the quarterfinals move on to play seed 1 while the other remaining seed played seed 2 in the semifinals.

== Bracket ==
First round Tuesday, March 8 ESPN3
5	UC Santa Barbara	62
8	UC Irvine	43
6	Cal Poly	72
7	CSUN	51

Quarterfinals (Re-Seeded); Wednesday, March 9 ESPN3
4	UC Davis	71
5	UC Santa Barbara	67
3	Long Beach State	54
6	Cal Poly	52

Semifinals (Re-Seeded); Friday, March 11; ESPN3
1	UC Riverside	72
4	UC Davis	81
2	Hawaii	76
3	Long Beach State	60

Championship game Saturday, March 12; FS PRIME/FCS Pacific
4	UC Davis	59
2	Hawaii	78
