= 2022–23 Hawaii Rainbow Wahine basketball team =

American college basketball season

2022–23 Hawaii Rainbow Wahine basketball

Big West tournament champions

NCAA tournament, first round
- Conference: Big West Conference
- Record: 18–15 (13–7 Big West)
- Head coach: Laura Beeman (11th season)
- Assistant coaches: Alex Delanian; Derrick Florence; DeAudra Brown
- Home arena: Stan Sheriff Center (Capacity: 10,300)

2022–23 Big West women's basketball standings
	Conf.				Overall
Team	W		L	PCT	W		L	PCT
UC Irvine	16	–	2	.889	25	–	7	.781
Long Beach State	17	–	3	.850	23	–	10	.697
Hawai'i†	13	–	7	.650	18	–	15	.545
UC Davis	12	–	7	.632	16	–	14	.533
UC Santa Barbara	12	–	8	.600	21	–	12	.636
UC San Diego*	10	–	10	.500	13	–	17	.433
Cal State Fullerton	9	–	11	.450	14	–	16	.467
Cal Poly	7	–	12	.368	10	–	18	.357
Cal State Northridge	6	–	14	.300	7	–	24	.226
Cal State Bakersfield	3	–	17	.150	8	–	23	.258
UC Riverside	3	–	17	.150	6	–	26	.188
† 2023 Big West tournament winner * ineligible for the 2023 NCAA tournament due to transition period As of March 20, 2023

The 2022–23 Hawaii Rainbow Wahine basketball team represented the University of Hawaiʻi at Mānoa during the 2022–23 NCAA Division I women's basketball season. The Rainbow Wahine, led by Laura Beeman in her 11th season as head coach, played their home games at SimpliFi Arena at Stan Sheriff Center in Honolulu as a member of the Big West Conference.

The Wahine finished third in the Big West during the regular season and won the Big West tournament. They were eliminated in the first round of the NCAA tournament.

== Previous season ==
The Rainbow Wahine finished the season with a 20–10 record, including a 13–3 mark in Big West conference play that netted them the regular season championship and the top overall seed in the Big West Conference tournament. The team won the conference tournament and the automatic bid to the NCAA tournament, where they lost to Baylor in the first round.

== Roster ==
2022–23 Hawaii Rainbow Wahine women's basketball team
Players
Coaches

Pos.	#	Name	Height	Year	Previous school	Hometown
F	0	Avery Watkins	6 ft 0 in (1.83 m)	Fr	Kennedy Catholic HS	Seattle, WA
G	1	Kelsie Imai	5 ft 7 in (1.7 m)	So	Waiakea HS	Pahoa, HI
G	2	Ashley Thoms	5 ft 7 in (1.7 m)	RS Jr	Campolindo HS; Weber State	Lafayette, CA
G	3	Lily Wahinekapu	5 ft 7 in (1.7 m)	So	ʻIolani School; Cal State Fullerton	Kane‘ohe, O‘ahu
G	4	Jovi Lefotu	5 ft 8 in (1.73 m)	Fr	ʻIolani School	Kane‘ohe, O‘ahu
F	11	Kallin Spiller (C)	6 ft 3 in (1.91 m)	GS	Lakeside School (WA); Columbia/Seattle	Seattle, WA
F	12	Imani Perez	6 ft 4 in (1.93 m)	Fr	Mullen HS	Seattle, WA
G	13	Hallie Birdsong	5 ft 3 in (1.6 m)	So	Kalani HS	Honolulu, HI
F	14	Nnenna Orji	6 ft 2 in (1.88 m)	So	Etiwanda HS	Rancho Cucamonga, CA
G	15	Daejah Phillips	5 ft 10 in (1.78 m)	So	Centennial HS (NV)	Las Vegas, NV
G	20	McKenna Haire (C)	5 ft 10 in (1.78 m)	GS	Myers Park HS; Princeton	Charlotte, NC
G	23	Meilani McBee	5 ft 10 in (1.78 m)	So	Kennewick HS	Kennewick, WA
G	32	Eva Ongoongotau	5 ft 10 in (1.78 m)	So	Pleasant Grove HS (UT)	Pleasant Grove, UT
F	34	Jacque David	5 ft 11 in (1.8 m)	So	William Chrisman HS	Independence, MO
G	45	Olivia Davies	5 ft 9 in (1.75 m)	RS So	Mat-Su Career Tech	Anchorage, AK

Head coach

- Laura Beeman (Cal State San Bernardino)

Assistant coach(es)

- Alex Delanian (USC)
  Associate Head Coach
- Derrick Florence (Morehouse)
- DeAudra Brown (Elizabeth City State)

Legend

- (C) Team captain
- (S) Suspended
- (I) Ineligible
- (W) Walk-on
- Injured
- Current redshirt

Roster

== Schedule and results ==
Date time, TV	Rank^{#}	Opponent^{#}	Result	Record	Site (attendance) city, state
Exhibition
November 1, 2023*; 7:00 p.m.		Hawaii Pacific	W 73–49		Stan Sheriff Center (1,306); Honolulu, HI
Non-conference regular season
November 7, 2023*; 3:30 p.m.		at Oregon State	L 60–61	0–1	Gill Coliseum (3,663); Corvallis, OR
November 9, 2023*; 3:00 p.m.		at Portland	L 54–70	0–2	Chiles Center (492); Portland, OR
November 18, 2023*; 2:30 p.m.		Florida Gulf Coast; Bank of Hawaii Classic	L 45–65	0–3	Stan Sheriff Center (1,239); Honolulu, HI
November 20, 2023*; 2:00 p.m., Spectrum Sports		Lipscomb; Bank of Hawaii Classic	L 69–73 ^{OT}	0–4	Stan Sheriff Center (1,416); Honolulu, HI
November 25, 2023*; 2:30 p.m.		Grambling State; Rainbow Wahine Showdown	W 63–47	1–4	Stan Sheriff Center (1,349); Honolulu, HI
November 26, 2022*; 2:30 p.m.		Florida Gulf Coast; Rainbow Wahine Showdown	L 50–63	1–5	Stan Sheriff Center (1,340); Honolulu, HI
November 27, 2022*; 2:30 p.m., Spectrum Sports		No. 2 Stanford; Rainbow Wahine Showdown	L 39–68	1–6	Stan Sheriff Center (2,152); Honolulu, HI
December 11, 2022*; 2:00 p.m., Spectrum Sports		UNLV	L 66–76	1–7	Stan Sheriff Center; Honolulu, HI
December 21, 2022*; 12:00 p.m.		at San Jose State	W 54–43	2–7	Provident Credit Union Event Center (402); San Jose, CA
Big West regular season
December 29, 2022; 4:00 p.m.		at UC Davis	W 70–62	3–7 (1–0)	University Credit Union Center (494); Davis, CA
December 31, 2022; 12:00 p.m.		at Cal Poly	W 50–47	4–7 (2–0)	Mott Athletics Center (642); San Luis Obispo, CA
January 5, 2023; 7:00 p.m., Spectrum Sports		UC San Diego	L 57–60	4–8 (2–1)	Stan Sheriff Center (1,265); Honolulu, HI
January 7, 2023; 7:00 p.m., Spectrum Sports		Cal State Fullerton	W 66–53	5–8 (3–1)	Stan Sheriff Center (1,813); Honolulu, HI
January 14, 2023; 1:00 p.m., SPECSN		at Long Beach State	W 66–53	5–9 (3–2)	Walter Pyramid (688); Long Beach, CA
January 16, 2023; 5:00 p.m., ESPN+		at Cal State Northridge	W 76–60	6–9 (4–2)	Premier America Credit Union Arena (211); Northridge, CA
January 19, 2023; 7:00 p.m., Spectrum Sports		UC Irvine	L 67–71 ^{OT}	6–10 (4–3)	Stan Sheriff Center (1,400); Honolulu, HI
January 21, 2023; 7:00 p.m., Spectrum Sports		UC Riverside	W 55–51	7–10 (5–3)	Stan Sheriff Center (1,477); Honolulu, HI
January 26, 2023; 5:00 p.m., ESPN+		at UC Santa Barbara	L 69–72	7–11 (5–4)	The Thunderdome (313); Santa Barbara, CA
January 28, 2023; 12:00 p.m., ESPN+		at Cal State Bakersfield	W 51–47	8–11 (6–4)	Icardo Center (439); Bakersfield, CA
February 2, 2023; 7:00 p.m., Spectrum Sports		UC Davis	L 47–57	8–12 (6–5)	Stan Sheriff Center (1,380); Honolulu, HI
February 4, 2023; 7:00 p.m., Spectrum Sports		Cal Poly	W 80–58	9–12 (7–5)	Stan Sheriff Center (1,641); Honolulu, HI
February 9, 2023; 5:00 p.m., ESPN+		at UC San Diego	W 61–58	10–12 (8–5)	LionTree Arena (429); San Diego, CA
February 11, 2023; 4:00 p.m., ESPN+		at Cal State Fullerton	W 60–54	11–12 (9–5)	Titan Gym (252); Fullerton, CA
February 18, 2023; 7:00 p.m., Spectrum Sports		Long Beach State	L 47–48	11–13 (9–6)	Stan Sheriff Center (1,657); Honolulu, HI
February 20, 2023; 2:00 p.m., Spectrum Sports		Cal State Bakersfield	W 65–52	12–13 (10–6)	Stan Sheriff Center (1,370); Honolulu, HI
February 23, 2023; 4:00 p.m., ESPN+		at UC Riverside	W 60–49	13–13 (11–6)	SRC Arena (302); Riverside, CA
February 25, 2023; 12:00 p.m., ESPN+		at UC Irvine	L 66–68 ^{OT}	13–14 (11–7)	Bren Events Center (973); Irvine, CA
March 2, 2023; 7:00 p.m., Spectrum Sports		Cal State Northridge	W 66–58	14–14 (12–7)	Stan Sheriff Center (1,382); Honolulu, HI
March 4, 2023; 7:00 p.m., Spectrum Sports		UC Santa Barbara	W 68–58	15–14 (13–7)	Stan Sheriff Center (2,248); Honolulu, HI
Big West tournament
March 8, 2023; 6:30 p.m., ESPN+	(3)	vs. (6) Cal State Fullerton; Quarterfinals	W 82–75 ^{2OT}	16–14	Dollar Loan Center (959); Henderson, NV
March 10, 2023; 12:30 p.m., ESPN+	(3)	vs. (2) Long Beach State; Semifinals	W 67–62	17–14	Dollar Loan Center (1,119); Henderson, NV
March 11, 2023; 1:00 p.m., ESPN+	(3)	vs. (5) UC Santa Barbara; Championship	W 61–59	18–14	Dollar Loan Center (1,216); Henderson, NV
NCAA tournament
March 18, 2023*; 11:30 a.m., ESPN2	(14 G2)	at (3 G2) No. 9 LSU; First Round	L 50–73	18–15	Pete Maravich Assembly Center (8,608); Baton Rouge, LA
*Non-conference game. ^{#}Rankings from AP Poll. (#) Tournament seedings in parentheses. G2=Greenville 2. All times are in Hawaii–Aleutian Time. Source:

== See also ==
- 2022–23 Hawaii Rainbow Warriors basketball team
