= 2023 Big West Conference women's basketball tournament =

Women's Basketball postseason tournament 2023 Nevada

- Classification: Division I
- Season: 2022–23
- Teams: 10
- Site: Dollar Loan Center; Henderson, Nevada
- Champions: Hawai'i (4th title)
- Winning coach: Laura Beeman (3rd title)
- MVP: Daejah Phillips (Hawai'i)
- Television: ESPN+

2022–23 Big West women's basketball standings
	Conf.				Overall
Team	W		L	PCT	W		L	PCT
UC Irvine	16	–	2	.889	25	–	7	.781
Long Beach State	17	–	3	.850	23	–	10	.697
Hawai'i†	13	–	7	.650	18	–	15	.545
UC Davis	12	–	7	.632	16	–	14	.533
UC Santa Barbara	12	–	8	.600	21	–	12	.636
UC San Diego*	10	–	10	.500	13	–	17	.433
Cal State Fullerton	9	–	11	.450	14	–	16	.467
Cal Poly	7	–	12	.368	10	–	18	.357
Cal State Northridge	6	–	14	.300	7	–	24	.226
Cal State Bakersfield	3	–	17	.150	8	–	23	.258
UC Riverside	3	–	17	.150	6	–	26	.188
† 2023 Big West tournament winner * ineligible for the 2023 NCAA tournament due to transition period As of March 20, 2023

The 2023 Big West Conference Women's basketball tournament was the postseason women's basketball tournament for the Big West Conference of the 2022–23 NCAA Division I women's basketball season. It was held March 7–11, 2023, at the Dollar Loan Center in Henderson, Nevada. Hawai'i won the tournament, their fourth title, and received the conference's automatic bid to the 2023 NCAA tournament. The women's championship was broadcast exclusively on ESPN's over-the-top service, ESPN+.

== Seeds ==
Of the 11 conference teams, 10 are eligible for the tournament. UC San Diego is ineligible for the tournament, as it is in the third year of the four-year transition required for teams transferring to Division I from Division II. Teams are seeded based on their performance within the conference, and teams with identical conference records are seeded using a tiebreaker system. Unlike previous years, reseeding teams after the quarterfinals will not take place for the 2023 tournament.

Seed	School	Record	Tiebreaker
1	UC Irvine	16-2	
2	Long Beach State	17-3	
3	Hawai'i	13-7	
4	UC Davis	12-7	
5	UC Santa Barbara	12-8	
6	Cal State Fullerton	9-11	
7	Cal Poly	7-12	
8	Cal State Northridge	6-14	
9	Cal State Bakersfield	3-17	2-0 vs. UC Riverside
10	UC Riverside	3-17	0-2 vs. Cal State Bakersfield

== Schedule and results ==
Game	Time	Matchup	Score	Television
First round – Tuesday, March 7
1	12:00 pm	No. 8 Cal State Northridge vs. No. 9 Cal State Bakersfield	52-55	ESPN+
2	2:30 pm	No. 7 Cal Poly vs. No. 10 UC Riverside	54-63	ESPN+
Quarterfinals – Wednesday, March 8
3	12:00 pm	No. 1 UC Irvine vs No. 9 Cal State Bakersfield	59-61^{2OT}	ESPN+
4	2:30 pm	No. 4 UC Davis vs. No. 5 UC Santa Barbara	36-70	ESPN+
5	6:00 pm	No. 2 Long Beach State vs No. 10 UC Riverside	55-49	ESPN+
6	8:30 pm	No. 3 Hawai'i vs. No. 6 Cal State Fullerton	82-75^{2OT}	ESPN+
Semifinals – Friday, March 10
7	12:00 pm	No. 9 Cal State Bakersfield vs No. 5 UC Santa Barbara	66-75	ESPN+
8	2:30 pm	No. 2 Long Beach State vs No. 3 Hawai'i	62-67	ESPN+
Final – Saturday, March 11
9	3:00 pm	No. 5 UC Santa Barbara vs No. 3 Hawai'i	59-61	ESPN+
*Game times in PST. Rankings denote tournament seed

== Bracket ==
First round March 7 ESPN+
8	Cal State Northridge	52
9	Cal State Bakersfield	55
7	Cal Poly	54
10	UC Riverside	63

Quarterfinals; March 8 ESPN+
1	UC Irvine	59
9	Cal State Bakersfield	61**
4	UC Davis	36
5	UC Santa Barbara	70
2	Long Beach State	55
10	UC Riverside	49
3	Hawai'i	82**
6	Cal State Fullerton	75

Semifinals; March 10; ESPN+
9	Cal State Bakersfield	66
5	UC Santa Barbara	75
2	Long Beach State	62
3	Hawai'i	67

Championship; March 11; ESPN+
5	UC Santa Barbara	59
3	Hawai'i	61

Note: * denotes overtime
