= 2009–10 Hawaii Rainbow Wahine basketball team =

Intercollegiate basketball season

2009–10 Hawaii Rainbow Wahine basketball
- Conference: Western Athletic Conference

Ranking
- Coaches: No. NR
- AP: No. NR
- Record: 10-20 (4-12 WAC)
- Head coach: Dana Takahara-Dias
- Assistant coaches: Da Houl; Serenda Valdez; Patrick Knapp
- Home arena: Stan Sheriff Center

The 2009–10 Hawaii Rainbow Wahine basketball team represented the University of Hawaiʻi at Mãnoa in the 2009–10 NCAA Division I women's basketball season. The Rainbow Wahine, coached by Dana Takahara-Dias, are a member of the Western Athletic Conference.

== Offseason ==
- May 28: Former University of Hawaiʻi women’s basketball player and assistant Dana Takahara-Dias has been selected as the school’s new head women’s basketball coach. Takahara-Dias was a four-year UH letterwinner from 1984 to 1988. She is the program’s seventh head coach since becoming a varsity sport in 1974 and first woman head coach since Patsy Dung (1974–79).
- June 16: Shawna Kuehu signed a scholarship agreement for the 2009-10 season. Kuehu won three state titles at Punahou School. She was named the State Player of the Year her sophomore and senior seasons. In her freshman year, she was first team All-State. In the state championship game her sophomore season, she scored a record 37 points. Her senior year, she scored 20 points and grabbed 13 rebounds in the state title victory.

== Exhibition ==
Date	Opponent	Location	Time	Score
11/4/2009	HPU (Exhibition)	Honolulu, HI	7 p.m.	W 73-70

== Regular season ==
The Rainbow Wahine participated in several tournaments. The Jack in the Box Rainbow Wahine Classic was held from November 27–29. The Hukilau Tournament was played from December 4–5. On December 19, the school participated in the Duel in the Desert. From December 29–31, the Rainbow Wahine played in the Waikiki Beach Marriott Resort Classic.

=== Roster ===
Number	Name	Height	Position	Class
2	Briauna Linton	5-10	Guard	Sophomore
4	Jennifer Hamilton	5-6	Guard	Sophomore
5	Dita Liepkalne	6-1	Forward	Senior
10	Megan Tinnin	5-10	Guard	Senior
11	Katie Wilson	6-3	Center	Sophomore
12	Breanna Arbuckle	6-0	Forward	Sophomore
14	Julita Bungaite	6-2	Forward/Center	Junior
15	Leilani Galdones	5-6	Guard	Junior
20	Shawna Kuehu	5-10	Guard/Forward	Freshman
21	Keisha Kanekoa	5-6	Guard	Junior
22	Rebecca Dew	6-3	Center	Sophomore
24	Allie Patterson	6-1	Guard/Forward	Junior
25	Mai Ayabe	5-4	Guard	Junior
31	Courtney Gaddis	5-11	Guard	Junior

=== Schedule ===
Date	Opponent	Location	Time	Score
11/17/2009	at UC Riverside	Riverside, CA	3 p.m. PT	W 63-58
11/19/2009	at UCLA	Los Angeles, CA	7 p.m.PT	L 52-98
11/21/2009	at CS Bakersfield	Bakersfield, CA	7 p.m.PT	75-105
11/27/2009	Arizona State	Honolulu, HI	5 p.m.	L 53-65
11/29/2009	East Tennessee State	Honolulu, HI	5 p.m.	L 83-94 (OT)
12/3/2009	San Francisco	Honolulu, HI	7 p.m.	W 58-48
12/4/2009	at BYU-Hawaii	Laie, O'ahu	4 p.m.	W 76-46
12/5/2009	at BYU	Provo, Utah	1 p.m.	L 44-81
12/19/2009	at Kansas State	Las Vegas, Nev.	7:30 p.m.PT	W 71-61
12/20/2009	at UNLV	Las Vegas, Nev. 2:30 p.m.	7:30 p.m.	L 54-67
12/21/09	at Florida State	Las Vegas, Nev.	5:00 p.m.PT	L 39-83
12/29/2009	Kent State	Honolulu, HI	7 p.m.	W 54-53
12/30/2009	Kent State	Honolulu, HI	7 p.m.	W 63-60
1/6/2010	at Fresno State*	Fresno, CA	7 p.m.PT	L 42-83
1/9/2010	at New Mexico State*	Las Cruces, NM	7 p.m.MT	L 51-73
1/13/2010	Idaho*	Honolulu, HI	7 p.m.	W 62-52
1/16/2010	Nevada*	Honolulu, HI	7 p.m.	L 62-80
1/18/2010	Utah State*	Honolulu, HI	5 p.m.	W 69-56
1/21/2010	at Louisiana Tech*	Ruston, LA	7 p.m.CT	L 62-75
1/23/2010	at Boise State*	Boise, ID	7 p.m.MT	L 64-73
1/27/2010	San Jose State*	Honolulu, HI	7 p.m.	W 63-49
2/6/2010	Fresno State*	Honolulu, HI	5 p.m.	L 69-78
2/10/2010	New Mexico State*	Honolulu, HI	7 p.m.	L 67-75
2/13/2010	at Idaho*	Moscow, ID	2 p.m.PT	L 59-74
2/15/2010	at Nevada*	Reno, Nev.	TBA	L 56-76
2/17/2010	at San Jose State*	San Jose, CA	7 p.m.PT	L 61-68
2/20/2010	Louisiana Tech*	Honolulu, HI	5 p.m.	L 71-79
2/24/2010	Boise State*	Honolulu, HI	7 p.m.	W 66-64
3/6/2010	at Utah State*	Logan, UT	3 p.m.MT	L 51-53
3/9/2010	at WAC Tournament Fresno State	Reno, Nev.	TBA	L 55-83
