= Rabia Siddique =

Australian lawyer

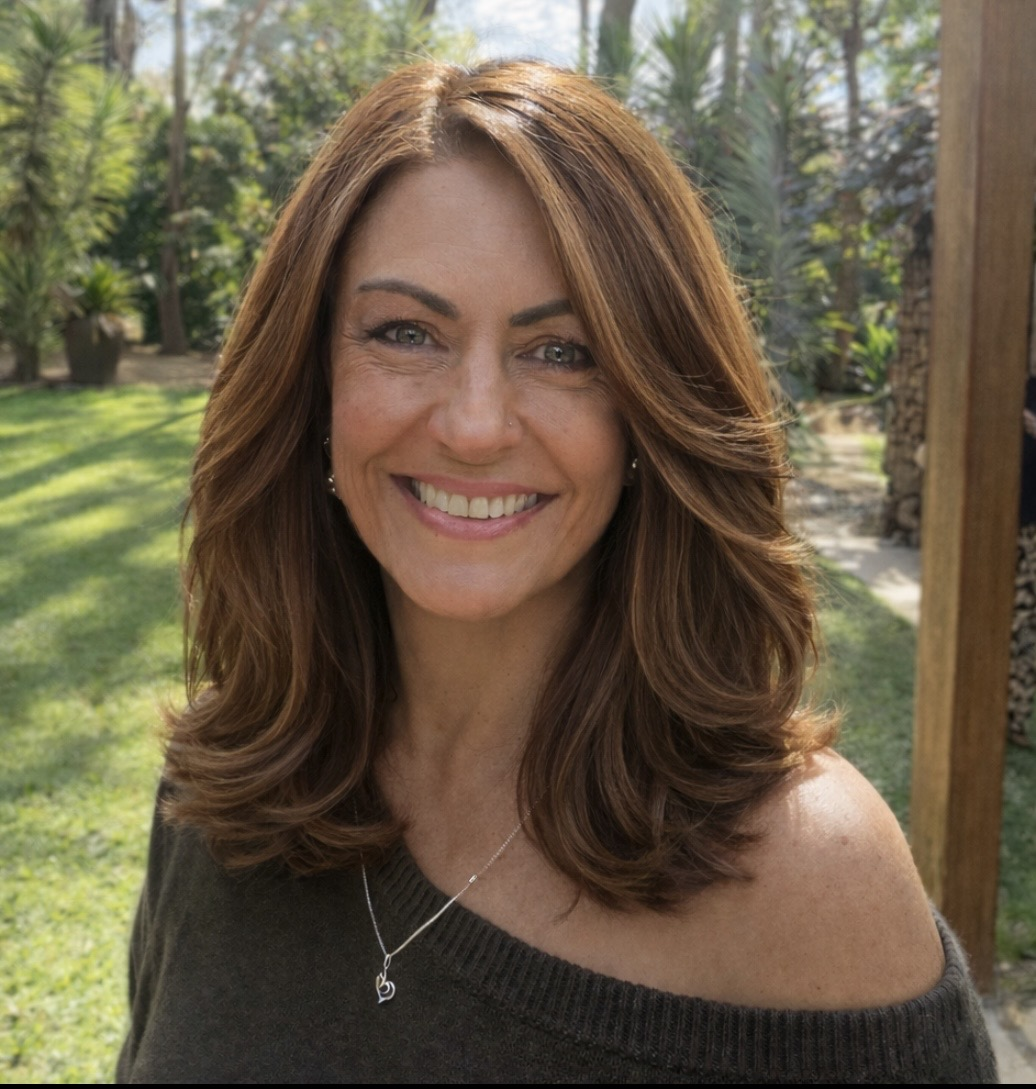
- Born: November 25, 1971 (age 54); Perth, Western Australia, Australia
- Education: University of Western Australia
- Occupations: Lawyer; author; professional speaker
- Years active: 1994–present
- Known for: Al-Jameat hostage crisis; Human rights advocacy; Discrimination case against the UK Ministry of Defence
- Notable work: Equal Justice – My Journey as a Woman, a Soldier and a Muslim
- Children: 3
- Awards: Queen's Commendation for Valuable Service
- Military career
- Allegiance: United Kingdom
- Branch: British Army
- Service years: 2001–2008
- Rank: Major
- Conflicts: Iraq War

Rabia Siddique (born 25 November 1971) is an international human rights and criminal lawyer, retired British Army officer, best selling author, professional speaker and hostage survivor.

In 2008, she sued the UK Ministry of Defence for discrimination, alleging it failed to acknowledge her role in the rescue of two captured Special Forces soldiers in Iraq.

== Education and early career ==
Siddique was born in Perth, Western Australia, to an Indian Muslim father and Australian mother. Her early childhood was spent in India and her family returned to Perth when she was five. She attended Manning Primary School and Penrhos College where she was school captain in her final year.

Siddique graduated from the University of Western Australia with a Bachelor of Laws in 1994, and a Bachelor of Arts in 1996.

== Legal career ==
As a university student, Siddique volunteered for the Aboriginal Legal Services. Her early career included working in Singapore representing prisoners seeking clemency on death row. She returned to Perth to work for the Legal Aid Commission of Western Australia , where she became an accredited criminal duty solicitor in Western Australia, before becoming a Federal Prosecutor with the Commonwealth Director of Public Prosecutions, the youngest in the country at that time.

From 1997 to 1998, Siddique served as a criminal prosecutor with the Commonwealth DPP in Perth. She was President of the Australian Young Lawyers Committee and an elected member of the Council of the Law Society of Western Australia.

Moving to London in 1998, she worked in public liability, and as a criminal defence lawyer.

She was admitted as a solicitor of the Supreme Court of England and Wales in January 1999, having previously been admitted as a barrister and solicitor of the Supreme Court of Western Australia and of the High Court and Federal Court of Australia in March 1996. She later obtained Higher Rights of Audience (Criminal Proceedings) as a solicitor advocate in England and Wales in February 2000, and became an accredited Criminal Duty Solicitor in England and Wales (August 2000).

== Military career ==
In September 2001, Siddique commissioned as an officer in the British Army Legal Services. She undertook specialist training in International Humanitarian Law and the Law of Armed Conflict (2004–2005) and became an accredited Equality and Diversity Solicitor and Mediator (2006–2008). In early 2005, after being promoted to the rank of major, Siddique was deployed for a seven-month tour as the sole legal advisor to 12th Mechanised Brigade in Basra, Iraq.

=== The al-Jameat hostage crisis ===
On 19 September 2005, two British Special Forces soldiers were captured and illegally detained while investigating the infiltration of the police force by Shi'ite extremists. They were taken to the Jameat, or al-Jameat, a police compound in the Iraqi port city of Basra.

Major James Woodham, head of the brigade’s surveillance unit, was sent to negotiate the soldiers’ release. When talks collapsed, the Iraqi representative, Judge Raghib, refused to deal with anyone except “Major Rabia”.

Despite having no hostage negotiation training, Siddique was ordered by her chief of staff, Major Rupert Jones, to take over. She secured initial concessions, including the removal of the soldiers’ hoods and chains, and negotiated draft release terms. Before agreement, the compound was overrun by a crowd incited by local police, who falsely claimed the soldiers were Israeli spies.

Siddique and Woodham were taken hostage along with others. During the standoff, she was threatened at gunpoint. After nearly ten hours, British Warrior armoured vehicles intervened and freed the group. The operation then continued to a Hezbollah safe house, where the two captured soldiers, who had been transferred there, were recovered.

=== Military career post al-Jameat and Basra ===
Woodham was awarded a Military Cross for bravery in the al-Jameat incident. Siddique was not mentioned in official reports and she was not invited to take part in a Whitehall inquiry into the incident.

She was posted to the armed forces employment law branch where she trained soldiers and officers on equality and diversity in 2006.. On one occasion Siddique was chosen to train a cohort of officers in training at the Royal Military Academy Sandhurst that included the then Officer Cadet Wales, His Royal Highness Prince William.

At this time her image was used to promote women and minorities in the British Army, and she became the Army’s ‘poster girl’ for diversity.

In 2006, Siddique was awarded the Queen's Commendation for Valuable Service (QCVS) for her humanitarian work in Iraq, including coordinating a class action on behalf of 17 victims of human rights abuses in the Iraqi Central Criminal Court and successfully proposing the establishment of an Independent Police Complaints Commission, which was approved by the Iraqi Government.

=== Legal battle ===
Siddique submitted a formal grievance with the Army Board, suing the UK Ministry of Defence for race and sex discrimination in May 2007. When news of the case was leaked, the British press portrayed Siddique as money-grabbing and a medal hunter. There were efforts by the British Army to pursue a medical discharge, and by the Ministry of Defence to have the case heard privately on national security grounds, though neither of these routes was successful.

In June 2008, the UK Ministry of Defence persuaded Siddique to settle out of court. She was awarded an undisclosed sum as damages, a letter of apology and praise about her role at al-Jameat from the Chief of the General Staff, Sir Richard Dannatt.

== Post-military career ==
For three years Siddique worked as a Crown Advocate in the Counterterrorism Division of the Crown Prosecution Service. Returning to Perth with her family in 2011, Siddique worked for a year as a senior legal officer in the West Australian Corruption and Crime Commission and for three years as Commissioner's Legal Counsel for the Western Australian Police.

She also served as Deputy National Coordinator for Domestic and Violent Extremism prosecutions from 2008 to 2011.

Returning to Perth in 2011, Siddique worked at the West Australian Corruption and Crime Commission as a Principal Lawyer, acting briefly as Director of Legal Services and serving as Chief Legal Officer for CHOGM 2011. She then spent two years with the Western Australia Police as Senior Legal Counsel and later Commissioner's Legal Counsel.

She is an adjunct faculty member at UNSW's Australian Graduate School of Management since 2022.

She has advised on or represented parties in several high-profile matters, including the Christchurch mosque shootings, the murder case of Maldivian student Raudha Athif, and native title mediations with the offshore petroleum industry.

== Awards and achievements ==
In 2006 Siddique was awarded the Queen's Commendation for Valuable Service for her human rights work in Iraq.

In 2009 she was the Runner-up for Australian Woman of the Year UK. She is a Telstra Business Women's Award Finalist and in 2014 was named one of Westpac and the Australian Financial Review's 100 Women of Influence.

In 2015, an audience of 1700 people gave her a standing ovation for her TEDx talk Courage Under Fire, and in 2016 Siddique was a state finalist in the Australian of the Year Awards.

Since 2014, Siddique has gained an international reputation as a motivational speaker, and is sometimes thought of as a leader and/or reformer. An active human rights advocate and philanthropist, Siddique is a patron and ambassador for several not-for-profit and charity organizations.

In 2016 she was appointed as a Director of the International Foundation of Non-Violence.

In 2017 she won the Professional Speakers Australia Breakthrough Speaker of the Year award.

In 2026 she was inducted into the Western Australia Women’s Hall of Fame for services to the community.

== Personal life ==
Rabia currently lives in Perth, Australia with triplet sons, who were born in 2008 in Salisbury, England.

== Major published work ==
In 2013 Siddique published her memoir, Equal Justice – My Journey as a Woman, a Soldier and a Muslim (Pan Macmillan, 2013), which became a best seller.
