= Khalilah Mitchell =

American basketball coach

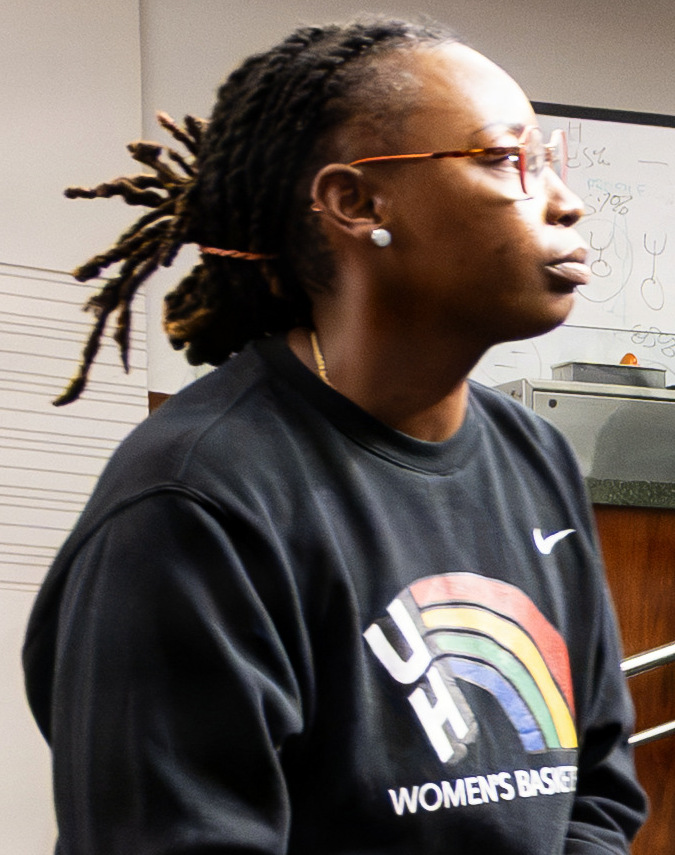
- Mitchell in 2026

Current position
- Title: Head coach
- Team: Hawaii
- Conference: Mountain West
- Record: 0–0 (–)

Biographical details
- Born: December 25, 1985 (age 40); Atlanta, Georgia, U.S.

Playing career
- 2003–2008: LSU
- Position: Guard

Coaching career (HC unless noted)
- 2009–2011: UCF (GA)
- 2011–2014: UCF (assistant)
- 2018–2022: Hawaii (assistant)
- 2022–2023: San Jose State (assistant)
- 2023–2026: Hawaii (assistant)
- 2026–present: Hawaii

Head coaching record
- Overall: 0–0 (–)

Khalilah Renee Mitchell (born December 25, 1985) is an American basketball coach who is currently the head coach of the University of Hawaiʻi women's basketball team.

== Playing career ==
Mitchell played college basketball at LSU from 2003 to 2008, redshirting her true freshman season due to a practice injury. LSU made the Final Four all five seasons Mitchell was with the program, making her and her teammate Marian Whitfield one of the few players to be part of five Final Four teams.

== Coaching career ==
Mitchell began her coaching career at UCF as an graduate assistant before being elevated to an assistant coach in 2011 and remaining in that role until the 2013–14 season. Mitchell was an AAU assistant coach from 2014 to 2016 before being named an assistant coach at Hawaii prior to the 2018–19 season under Laura Beeman. She left after the 2021–22 season to join the coaching staff at San Jose State as an assistant coach.

=== Hawaii (second stint) ===
Mitchell returned to Hawaii prior to the 2023–24 season as an assistant coach. She was promoted to head coach on April 21, 2026, following the retirement of Beeman.

== Head coaching record ==
Record table
| Season | Team | Overall | Conference | Standing | Postseason |
|---|---|---|---|---|---|
Hawaii Rainbow Wahine (Mountain West Conference) (2026–present)
| 2026–27 | Hawaii | 0–0 | | | |
| Hawaii: | | 0–0 (–) | 0–0 (–) | | |
| Total: | | 0–0 (–) | | | |
National champion Postseason invitational champion Conference regular season champion Conference regular season and conference tournament champion Division regular season champion Division regular season and conference tournament champion Conference tournament champion
