= 2022 Big West Conference women's basketball tournament =

- Classification: Division I
- Season: 2021–22
- Teams: 10
- Site: Dollar Loan Center; Henderson, Nevada
- Champions: Hawai'i (3rd title)
- Winning coach: Laura Beeman (2nd title)
- MVP: Amy Atwell (Hawaii)
- Television: ESPN+

2021–22 Big West women's basketball standings
	Conf.				Overall
Team	W		L	PCT	W		L	PCT
Hawaiʻi †	13	–	3	.813	20	–	10	.667
UC Irvine	14	–	4	.778	21	–	12	.636
Long Beach State	12	–	6	.667	19	–	9	.679
UC Riverside	10	–	6	.625	14	–	11	.560
UC San Diego*	10	–	8	.556	13	–	14	.481
UC Santa Barbara	9	–	8	.529	15	–	12	.556
UC Davis	8	–	8	.500	15	–	13	.536
Cal State Fullerton	5	–	12	.294	11	–	18	.379
Cal State Northridge	5	–	12	.294	9	–	19	.321
Cal State Bakersfield	3	–	11	.214	5	–	20	.200
Cal Poly	2	–	13	.133	3	–	22	.120
† 2022 Big West tournament winner * ineligible for the 2022 NCAA tournament due to transition period

The 2022 Big West Conference women's basketball tournament was the postseason women's basketball tournament for the Big West Conference of the 2021–22 NCAA Division I women's basketball season. It was held March 8–12, 2022, at the Dollar Loan Center in Henderson, Nevada. The winner received the conference's automatic bid to the 2022 NCAA tournament.

Hawaii won its third title, and its second since rejoining the Big West, for their seventh NCAA Tournament appearance.

== Seeds ==
Of the 11 conference teams, 10 are eligible for the tournament. UC San Diego remains ineligible for the Big West tournament, as they are in the second year of the four-year transition required for teams transferring to Division I from Division II, despite their games counting in the standings, unlike their men’s counterparts.

For this year only, teams were seeded by winning percentage within the conference due to unpredictability with COVID-19, with normal additional tiebreakers in place, if necessary. Unlike previous years until 2020, reseeding teams after the quarterfinals does not take place.

Seed	School	Record	Tiebreaker
1	Hawai'i	13–3	
2	UC Irvine	14-4	
3	Long Beach State	12-6	
4	UC Riverside	10-6	
5	UC Santa Barbara	9-8	
6	UC Davis	8-8	
7	Cal State Fullerton	5–12	2-0 vs. Cal State Northridge
8	Cal State Northridge	5-12	0-2 vs. Cal State Fullerton
9	Cal State Bakersfield	3-11	
10	Cal Poly	2–13	

== Schedule and results ==
Game	Time	Matchup	Score	Television
First round – Tuesday, March 8
1	12:00 pm	No. 8 CSUN vs. No. 9 CSU Bakersfield	62-63*	ESPN+
2	2:30 pm	No. 7 Cal State Fullerton vs. No. 10 Cal Poly	70-64	ESPN+
Quarterfinals – Wednesday, March 9
3	12:00 pm	No. 1 Hawai'i vs. No. 9 CSU Bakersfield	48-47	ESPN+
4	2:30 pm	No. 4 UC Riverside vs. No. 5 UC Santa Barbara	46-42	ESPN+
5	6:00 pm	No. 2 UC Irvine vs. No. 7 Cal State Fullerton	80-68	ESPN+
6	8:30 pm	No. 3 Long Beach State vs. No. 6 UC Davis	45-55	ESPN+
Semifinals – Friday, March 11
7	12:00 pm	No. 1 Hawai'i vs. No. 4 UC Riverside	69-55	ESPN+
8	2:30 pm	No. 2 UC Irvine vs. No. 6 UC Davis	84-75*	ESPN+
Final – Saturday, March 12
9	5:00 pm	No. 1 Hawai'i vs. No. 2 UC Irvine	59-48	ESPN+
*Game times in PST. Rankings denote tournament seed

== Bracket ==
First round March 8 ESPN+
8	Cal State Northridge	62
9	Cal State Bakersfield	63
7	Cal State Fullerton	70
10	Cal Poly	64

Quarterfinals; March 9 ESPN+
1	Hawai'i	48
9	Cal State Bakersfield	47
4	UC Riverside	46
5	UC Santa Barbara	42
2	UC Irvine	80
7	Cal State Fullerton	68
3	Long Beach State	45
6	UC Davis	55

Semifinals; March 11; ESPN+
1	Hawaii	69
4	UC Riverside	55
2	UC Irvine	84*
6	UC Davis	75

Championship; March 12; ESPN+
1	Hawaii	59
2	UC Irvine	48
