= List of Hawaii Rainbow Warriors head basketball coaches =

The following is a list of Hawaii Rainbow Warriors basketball head coaches. There have been 22 head coaches of the Rainbow Warriors in their 103-season history.

Hawaii's current head coach is Eran Ganot. He was hired as the Rainbow Warriors' head coach in April 2015, replacing Benjy Taylor, who was not retained after serving as interim coach for the 2014–15 season.

No.	Tenure	Coach	Years	Record	Pct.
–	1912–1916 (Note: Hawaii did not field a team for the 1913–14 season.)	No coach	3	13–6	.684
1	1918–1919	David L. Crawford	1	2–5	.286
2	1919–1920	Edward Williford	1	2–5	.286
3	1921–1923	Otto Klum	2	13–8	.619
4	1923–1926	Charles Jones	3	12–11	.522
5	1926–1929	Leslie Harrison	3	12–10	.545
6	1929–1930	Claude Swann	1	3–4	.429
7	1930–1941	Eugene Gill	11	88–47	.652
8	1941–1947 (Note: Hawaii did not field teams from 1942 to 1946 due to World War II.)	Bert Chan Wa	2	12–13	.480
9	1947–1951	Art Gallon	4	83–37	.692
10	1954–1957	Ah Chew Goo	3	31–46	.403
11	1951–1954; 1957–1963	Al Saake	9	92–124	.426
12	1963–1973	Red Rocha	10	112–136	.452
13	1973–1976	Bruce O'Neil	3	42–32	.568
14	1976* (Note: Pitino served as interim head coach for the final 6 games of the 1975–76 season after Bruce O'Neil was fired for NCAA violations.)	Rick Pitino	1	2–4	.333
15	1976–1985	Larry Little	9	103–143	.419
16	1985–1987	Frank Arnold	2	11–45	.196
17	1987–2007	Riley Wallace	20	334–265	.558
18	2007–2010	Bob Nash	3	34–56	.378
19	2010–2014 (Note: Hawaii vacated 36 wins from the 2012–13 and 2013–14 seasons. Arnold's on-court record is 72–55 (.567).)	Gib Arnold	4	36–55	.396
20	2014–2015* (Note: Taylor served as interim head coach for the entirety of the 2014–15 season after Gib Arnold was fired for NCAA violations.)	Benjy Taylor	1	22–13	.629
21	2015–present (Note: Gerlufsen served as acting head coach for the first 13 games of the 2019–20 season after Eran Ganot took a medical leave of absence.)	Eran Ganot	10	171–118	.592
22	2019*	Chris Gerlufsen	1	8–5	.615
Totals		22 coaches	103 seasons	1,258–1,177	.517
Records updated through end of 2023–24 season * - Denotes interim head coach. Source

== See also ==
- List of Hawaii Rainbow Wahine head basketball coaches
