= 2015–16 Hawaii Rainbow Wahine basketball team =

Intercollegiate basketball season

2015–16 Hawaii Rainbow Wahine basketball

Big West tournament Champion

NCAA tournament, First round
- Conference: Big West Conference
- Record: 22–11 (12–4 Big West)
- Head coach: Laura Beeman (4th season)
- Assistant coaches: Mary Wooley (associate head coach, 4th season); Dekita Williams (3rd season); Alex Delanian (2nd season)
- Home arena: Stan Sheriff Center

2015–16 Big West women's basketball standings
	Conf.				Overall
Team	W		L	PCT	W		L	PCT
UC Riverside	16	–	0	1.000	23	–	9	.719
Long Beach State	12	–	4	.750	24	–	9	.727
Hawaii †	12	–	4	.750	21	–	11	.656
UC Davis	10	–	6	.625	19	–	12	.613
UC Santa Barbara	8	–	8	.500	12	–	20	.375
Cal Poly	7	–	9	.438	15	–	16	.484
Cal State Northridge	5	–	11	.313	7	–	24	.226
UC Irvine	1	–	15	.063	4	–	27	.129
Cal State Fullerton	1	–	15	.063	3	–	27	.100
† 2016 Big West tournament winner As of March 19, 2016; Rankings from AP poll

The 2015–16 Hawaii Rainbow Wahine women's basketball team represented the University of Hawaii at Manoa during the 2015–16 NCAA Division I women's basketball season. The Wahine, led by fourth-year head coach Laura Beeman, played their home games at the Stan Sheriff Center as members of the Big West Conference. They finished the season 22–11, including 12–4 in Big West play to finish tied for second place with Long Beach State. Hawaii won the Big West tournament. With that conference tournament title, Hawaii earned an automatic bid to the NCAA tournament and lost in the first round to UCLA.

== Previous season ==
The Wahine finished the 2014–15 season 23–9 (14–2 Big West), good for first place in the conference. After losing the championship round of the Big West tournament, Hawaii earned an automatic bid to the WNIT by virtue of winning its regular season conference title and lost in the first round.

== Departures ==
Shawna-Lei Kuehu, Morgan Mason, and Shawlina Segovia, all seniors from the 2014–15 team, departed from the team due to graduation. In addition, freshmen Breana Jones and Jasmine Redmon left the team.

== Recruits ==
On December 3, 2014, guard Olivia Crawford from Lakes High School in Lakewood, Washington signed her national letter of intent to play for Hawaii.

On May 28, 2015, Hawaii announced the signings of combo guard Andrea Easley out of Horizon High School in Scottsdale, Arizona, as well as twin sisters and forwards Lahni and Leah Salanoa, both from Rio Mesa High School in Oxnard, California.

== Roster ==
2015–16 Hawaii Rainbow Wahine women's basketball team
Players
Coaches

Pos.	#	Name	Height	Year	Previous school	Hometown
C	00	Brianna Kennedy	6 ft 3 in (1.91 m)	RS Jr	Bonita HS; Loyola Marymount	La Verne, CA
G	3	Marissa Wimbley	5 ft 5 in (1.65 m)	Sr	Pleasant Grove HS	Elk Grove, CA
PG	4	Briana Harris	5 ft 7 in (1.7 m)	Jr	Saint Monica Catholic HS	Inglewood, CA
G	5	Sarah Toeaina	5 ft 11 in (1.8 m)	So	Kentwood HS	Covington, WA
F	12	Leah Salanoa	5 ft 10 in (1.78 m)	Fr	Rio Mesa HS	Oxnard, CA
G	20	Olivia Crawford	5 ft 5 in (1.65 m)	Fr	Lakes HS	Lakewood, WA
F	21	Lahni Salanoa	5 ft 11 in (1.8 m)	Fr	Rio Mesa HS	Oxnard, CA
G	22	Ashleigh Karaitiana	6 ft 0 in (1.83 m)	RS Sr	Endeavour Sports HS	Hamilton, New Zealand
F	24	Dalayna Sampton	6 ft 0 in (1.83 m)	So	Florin HS	Vallejo, CA
C	31	Megan Huff	6 ft 3 in (1.91 m)	So	Todd Beamer HS	Federal Way, WA
C	32	Kalei Adolpho	6 ft 1 in (1.85 m)	RS Sr	Moloka'i HS	Hoʻolehua, HI
C	33	Connie Morris	6 ft 4 in (1.93 m)	Sr	Virgin Valley HS; Salt Lake CC	Mesquite, NV
G/F	34	Destiny King	5 ft 9 in (1.75 m)	Sr	Long Beach Poly HS	Long Beach, CA

Head coach

- Laura Beeman (Cal State San Bernardino)

Assistant coach(es)

- Mary Wooley (South Carolina–Aiken)
- Dekita Williams (Louisiana)
- Alex Delanian (USC)

Legend

- (C) Team captain
- (S) Suspended
- (I) Ineligible
- (W) Walk-on
- Injured
- Current redshirt

Roster
Last update: 2016-03-06

== Schedule ==
Date time, TV	Rank^{#}	Opponent^{#}	Result	Record	Site (attendance) city, state
Exhibition
10/28/2015*; 7:00 pm		Hawaii–Hilo	W 86–39		Stan Sheriff Center (1,738); Honolulu, HI
Non-conference regular season
11/13/2015*; 11:00 am		Grand Canyon	W 74–41	1–0	GCU Arena (623); Phoenix, AZ
11/15/2015*; 11:00 am		at Northern Arizona	W 61–52	2–0	Rolle Activity Center (378); Flagstaff, AZ
11/20/2015*; 7:00 pm, OC Sports		Loyola Marymount; Rainbow Wahine Classic	W 65–51	3–0	Stan Sheriff Center (2,088); Honolulu, HI
11/22/2015*; 5:00 pm, OC Sports		Washington State; Rainbow Wahine Classic	L 52–62	3–1	Stan Sheriff Center (2,342); Honolulu, HI
11/27/2015*; 5:00 pm		Cal State Bakersfield; Rainbow Wahine Shootout	W 74–60	4–1	Stan Sheriff Center (2,020); Honolulu, HI
11/28/2015*; 4:00 pm		No. 16 Arizona State; Rainbow Wahine Shootout	L 49–75	4–2	Stan Sheriff Center (2,152); Honolulu, HI
11/29/2015*; 5:00 pm		No. 2 South Carolina; Rainbow Wahine Shootout	L 51–67	4–3	Stan Sheriff Center (2,073); Honolulu, HI
12/03/2015*; 6:00 pm		vs. BYU; Tom Weston Classic	L 56–67	4–4	Cannon Activities Center (257); Laie, HI
12/04/2015*; 5:00 pm		vs. No. 12 Texas A&M; Tom Weston Classic	L 41–82	4–5	Cannon Activities Center (150); Laie, HI
Exhibition
12/10/2015*; 7:00 pm		BYU–Hawaii	W 68–57	4–5	Stan Sheriff Center (1,708); Honolulu, HI
Non-conference regular season
12/20/2015*; 3:00 pm		at Sacramento State	W 74–72	5–5	Hornets Nest (311); Sacramento, CA
12/22/2015*; 1:00 pm		at San Jose State	W 76–73	6–5	Event Center Arena (1,236); San Jose, CA
12/30/2015*; 5:00 pm		at Cal State Bakersfield	W 65–55	7–5	Icardo Center (476); Bakersfield, CA
01/02/2016*; 8:00 pm, OC Sports		Penn	L 54–64	7–6	Stan Sheriff Center (1,810); Honolulu, HI
Big West regular season
01/07/2016; 5:00 pm		at Long Beach State	W 67–55	8–6 (1–0)	Walter Pyramid (630); Long Beach, CA
01/09/2016; 12:00 pm		at UC Davis	L 58–60	8–7 (1–1)	The Pavilion (508); Davis, CA
01/14/2016; 7:00 pm, OC Sports		Cal State Northridge	W 77–50	9–7 (2–1)	Stan Sheriff Center (1,881); Honolulu, HI
01/16/2016; 7:00 pm, OC Sports		UC Riverside	L 74–77	9–8 (2–2)	Stan Sheriff Center (2,405); Honolulu, HI
01/21/2016; 5:00 pm		at UC Irvine	W 83–65	10–8 (3–2)	Bren Events Center (175); Irvine, CA
01/23/2016; 5:00 pm		at Cal State Northridge	L 60–63	10–9 (3–3)	Matadome (365); Northridge, CA
01/28/2016; 7:05 pm, OC Sports		Cal State Fullerton	W 62–53	11–9 (4–3)	Stan Sheriff Center (1,773); Honolulu, HI
01/30/2016; 5:35 pm, OC Sports		UC Irvine	W 59–35	12–9 (5–3)	Stan Sheriff Center (10,300); Honolulu, HI
02/04/2016; 5:05 pm		at Cal Poly	W 64–58	13–9 (6–3)	Mott Athletic Center (382); San Luis Obispo, CA
02/06/2016; 12:00 pm		at UC Santa Barbara	W 63–62	14–9 (7–3)	UC Santa Barbara Events Center (407); Santa Barbara, CA
02/11/2016; 5:30 pm, OC Sports		Long Beach State	W 60–42	15–9 (8–3)	Stan Sheriff Center; Honolulu, HI
02/18/2016; 7:00 pm, OC Sports		UC Davis	W 70–50	16–9 (9–3)	Stan Sheriff Center (1,987); Honolulu, HI
02/25/2016; 5:00 pm, ESPN3		at Cal State Fullerton	W 70–50	17–9 (10–3)	Titan Gym (244); Fullerton, CA
02/27/2016; 5:00 pm		at UC Riverside	L 77–81	17–10 (10–4)	UC Riverside Student Recreation Center (623); Riverside, CA
03/03/2016; 7:05 pm, OC Sports		UC Santa Barbara	W 59–45	18–10 (11–4)	Stan Sheriff Center (1,945); Honolulu, HI
03/05/2016; 7:05 pm, OC Sports		Cal Poly	W 68–47	19–10 (12–4)	Stan Sheriff Center (2,884); Honolulu, HI
Big West tournament
03/11/2016; 12:30 pm	(2)	vs. (3) Long Beach State; Semifinal	W 76–70	20–10	Honda Center (1,048); Anaheim, CA
03/12/2016; 1:00 pm	(2)	vs. (4) UC Davis; Final	W 78–59	21–10	Honda Center (1,523); Anaheim, CA
NCAA Tournament
03/19/2016*; 1:30 pm, ESPN2	(14 B)	at (3 B) No. 10 UCLA; First Round	L 50–66	21–11	Pauley Pavilion (2,552); Los Angeles, CA
*Non-conference game. ^{#}Rankings from AP Poll. (#) Tournament seedings in parentheses. B=Bridgeport Region. All times are in Hawaii–Aleutian Time.

== See also ==
- 2015–16 Hawaii Rainbow Warriors basketball team
