= 2020–21 Hawaii Rainbow Wahine basketball team =

American college basketball season

2020–21 Hawaii Rainbow Wahine basketball
- Conference: Big West Conference
- Record: 9–8 (7–6 Big West)
- Head coach: Laura Beeman (9th season)
- Assistant coaches: Alex Delanian; Khalilah Mitchell; Jason Hill
- Home arena: Stan Sheriff Center (Capacity: 10,300)

2020–21 Big West women's basketball standings
	Conf.				Overall
Team	W		L	PCT	W		L	PCT
UC Davis †	9	–	1	.900	13	–	3	.813
UC Irvine	11	–	4	.733	15	–	9	.625
Long Beach State	11	–	7	.611	12	–	9	.571
Hawaiʻi	7	–	6	.538	9	–	8	.529
Cal State Bakersfield	7	–	6	.538	9	–	9	.500
Cal Poly	8	–	8	.500	13	–	11	.542
UC Santa Barbara	7	–	9	.438	7	–	14	.333
UC San Diego*	6	–	9	.400	6	–	9	.400
UC Riverside	5	–	9	.357	7	–	12	.368
Cal State Fullerton	2	–	14	.125	4	–	18	.182
† 2021 Big West tournament winner * ineligible for the 2021 NCAA tournament due to transition period Rankings from AP poll NOTE: Cal State Northridge will not play in the 2020–21 season due to COVID-19 concerns.

The 2020–21 Hawaii Rainbow Wahine basketball team represented the University of Hawaii at Manoa during the 2020–21 NCAA Division I women's basketball season. The Rainbow Wahine, led by ninth-year head coach Laura Beeman, played their home games at the Stan Sheriff Center in Honolulu, Hawaii. Hawaii is a member of the Big West Conference, and participated in their ninth season in that conference.

== Previous season ==
The Rainbow Wahine finished the 2019–20 season 15–17 (10–6 in Big West play), to finish fourth in the Big West standings. They defeated Cal State Fullerton in the first round of the Big West Conference tournament, 72–59. They did not play any other games beyond that as the tournament was canceled due to the COVID-19 pandemic.

== Departures ==
Name	Number	Position	Height	Year	Hometown	Reason for departure	Source
Julissa Tago	0	G	5' 9"	Senior	Medford, OR	Graduated	
Courtney Middap	2	G	5' 10"	Senior	Wynyard, Australia	Graduated	
MaKayla Edwards	3	F	5' 10"	Freshman	Vallejo, CA	Transferred to Jacksonville	
Savannah Reier	4	G	5' 7"	Senior	Tuscaloosa, AL	Graduated	
Myrrah Joseph	5	F	5' 10"	Sophomore	Carson, CA	Transferred to Long Beach State	
Lauren Rewers	14	C	6' 4"	Junior	Coeur d'Alene, ID	Transferred to Michigan State	
Lamarria Johnson	22	G	5' 8"	Redshirt Freshman	Chicago, IL	Transferred to Wabash Valley College	

=== Incoming transfers ===
Name	Position	Height	Year	Hometown	Notes
Alicja Falkowska	C	6' 5"	Junior	Łomianki, Poland	Junior college transfer from Panola College
Channel Noah	C	6' 4"	Junior	Cameroon	Junior college transfer from South Plains College
Dakota Viena	G	5' 8"	Junior	Waipahu, HI	Transferred from Hope International University

== 2020 commitments ==
College recruiting information
Name	Hometown	School	Height	Weight	Commit date
Kelsie Imai; G	Pahoa, HI	Waiakea High School	5 ft 7 in (1.70 m)	N/A	
Kelsie Imai; G	Recruit ratings: No ratings found				
Meilani McBee; G	Kennewick, WA	Kennewick High School	5 ft 10 in (1.78 m)	N/A	
Meilani McBee; G	Recruit ratings: No ratings found				
Teioni McDaniel; G	Las Vegas, NV	Centennial High School	5 ft 8 in (1.73 m)	N/A	
Teioni McDaniel; G	Recruit ratings: No ratings found				
Nnenna Orji; F	Rancho Cucamonga, CA	Etiwanda High School	6 ft 2 in (1.88 m)	N/A	
Nnenna Orji; F	Recruit ratings: No ratings found				
Daejah Phillips; G	Las Vegas, NV	Centennial High School	5 ft 10 in (1.78 m)	N/A	
Daejah Phillips; G	Recruit ratings: No ratings found				
Kylie Yung; G	Honolulu, HI	ʻIolani School	5 ft 8 in (1.73 m)	N/A	
Kylie Yung; G	Recruit ratings: No ratings found				
Overall recruit ranking:
Note: In many cases, Scout, Rivals, 247Sports, On3, and ESPN may conflict in their listings of height and weight.; In these cases, the average was taken. ESPN grades are on a 100-point scale.; Sources: "2020 Team Ranking". Rivals.

== Roster ==
2020–21 Hawaii Rainbow Wahine women's basketball team
Players
Coaches

Pos.	#	Name	Height	Year	Previous school	Hometown
G	0	Daejah Phillips	5 ft 10 in (1.78 m)	Fr	Centennial HS (NV)	Las Vegas, NV
G	1	Kelsie Imai	5 ft 7 in (1.7 m)	Fr	Waiakea HS	Pahoa, HI
G	2	Teionni McDaniel	5 ft 8 in (1.73 m)	Fr	Centennial HS (NV)	Las Vegas, NV
F	4	Nnenna Orji	6 ft 2 in (1.88 m)	Fr	Etiwanda HS	Rancho Cucamonga, CA
G	10	Dakota Viena	5 ft 8 in (1.73 m)	Jr	Maryknoll School; Hope International	Waipahu, HI
G	11	Olivia Davies	5 ft 9 in (1.75 m)	RS Fr	Mat-Su Career Tech	Anchorage, AK
F	15	Jadynn Alexander	5 ft 10 in (1.78 m)	Sr	Monroe HS (WA)	Monroe, WA
C	20	Alicja Falkowska	6 ft 5 in (1.96 m)	Jr	Panola College	Kosów Lacki, Poland
F	21	Kasey Neubert	6 ft 1 in (1.85 m)	So	Highlands Ranch HS	Elizabeth, CO
G	22	Kylie Yung	5 ft 8 in (1.73 m)	Fr	ʻIolani School	Honolulu, HI
G	23	Meilani McBee	5 ft 10 in (1.78 m)	Fr	Kennewick HS	Kennewick, WA
G	24	Nae Nae Calhoun	5 ft 5 in (1.65 m)	So	John W. North HS	Riverside, CA
F	25	Amy Atwell	6 ft 0 in (1.83 m)	RS Sr	Penrhos College	South Perth, Australia
C	35	Channel Noah	6 ft 4 in (1.93 m)	Jr	Francois Combes; South Plains College	Cameroon
C	44	Barbara Rangel	6 ft 2 in (1.88 m)	Sr	Ventura High School; Moorpark College	Ventura, CA

Head coach

- Laura Beeman (Cal State San Bernardino)

Assistant coach(es)

- Alex Delanian (USC)
- Khalilah Mitchell (LSU)
- Jason Hill (USC)

Support staff

- Teneshia Ruff (Jacksonville)
  Director of operations

Athletic trainer(s)

- Erin Tillman
  Assistant athletic tainer

Legend

- (C) Team captain
- (S) Suspended
- (I) Ineligible
- (W) Walk-on
- Injured
- Current redshirt

Roster
Last update: November 16, 2020

== Schedule and results ==
Date time, TV	Rank^{#}	Opponent^{#}	Result	Record	High points	High rebounds	High assists	Site (attendance) city, state
Non-conference regular season
December 13, 2020*; 5:00 p.m., Spectrum Sports		Hawaii Pacific	L 74–82	0–1	21 – Atwell	9 – Atwell	2 – Tied	Stan Sheriff Center (0); Honolulu, HI
December 20, 2020*; 2:00 p.m., Spectrum Sports		Hawaii–Hilo	W 71–54	1–1	22 – Phillips	11 – Atwell	4 – Phillips	Stan Sheriff Center (0); Honolulu, HI
Big West regular season
December 27, 2020		at Cal Poly	Cancelled due to the COVID-19 pandemic					Mott Athletic Center; San Luis Obispo, CA
December 28, 2020		at Cal Poly	Cancelled due to the COVID-19 pandemic					Mott Athletics Center; San Luis Obispo, CA
January 8, 2020		UC Riverside	Cancelled due to the COVID-19 pandemic					Stan Sheriff Center; Honolulu, HI
January 9, 2020		UC Riverside	Cancelled due to the COVID-19 pandemic					Stan Sheriff Center; Honolulu, HI
January 15, 2021; 2:00 p.m.		at Cal State Bakersfield	L 57–64	1–2 (0–1)	12 – Alexander	5 – Phillips	5 – Imai	Icardo Center; Bakersfield, CA
January 16, 2021; 2:00 p.m.		at Cal State Bakersfield	L 43–51	1–3 (0–2)	23 – Atwell	10 – Tied	3 – Tied	Icardo Center; Bakersfield, CA
January 22, 2021; 7:00 p.m., Spectrum Sports		Cal State Fullerton	W 49–47	2–3 (1–2)	17 – Davies	8 – Neubert	2 – Imai	Stan Sheriff Center; Honolulu, HI
January 23, 2021; 7:00 p.m., Spectrum Sports		Cal State Fullerton	W 57–43	3–3 (2–2)	15 – Alexander	8 – Neubert	4 – Imai	Stan Sheriff Center; Honolulu, HI
January 29, 2021; 2:00 p.m.		at UC Irvine	L 68–82	3–4 (2–3)	16 – Atwell	9 – Neubert	6 – Imai	Bren Events Center; Irvine, CA
January 30, 2021		at UC Irvine	Cancelled due to the COVID-19 pandemic					Bren Events Center; Irvine, CA
February 5, 2021; 2:00 p.m.		at Cal Poly	L 71–79 ^{OT}	3–5 (2–4)	19 – McBee	7 – Phillips	8 – Imai	Mott Athletics Center; San Luis Obispo, CA
February 6, 2021; 2:00 p.m.		at Cal Poly	W 66–60	4–5 (3–4)	16 – Alexander	8 – Neubert	7 – Imai	Mott Athletics Center; San Luis Obispo, CA
February 12, 2021; 3:00 p.m.		at UC Santa Barbara	W 72–62	5–5 (4–4)	19 – Neubert	15 – Neubert	10 – Imai	The Thunderdome; Santa Barbara, CA
February 13, 2021; 3:00 p.m.		at UC Santa Barbara	L 50–72	5–6 (4–5)	16 – Phillips	8 – Neubert	2 – Tied	The Thunderdome; Santa Barbara, CA
February 19, 2021		Cal State Northridge	Cal State Northridge opted out of the 2020–21 season					Stan Sheriff Center; Honolulu, HI
February 20, 2021		Cal State Northridge	Cal State Northridge opted out of the 2020–21 season					Stan Sheriff Center; Honolulu, HI
February 26, 2021; 2:00 p.m.		at Long Beach State	W 77–75	6–6 (5–5)	25 – Atwell	11 – Neubert	5 – Imai	Walter Pyramid; Long Beach, CA
February 27, 2021; 2:00 p.m.		at Long Beach State	W 76–73 ^{OT}	7–6 (6–5)	23 – Atwell	9 – Neubert	6 – Phillips	Walter Pyramid; Long Beach, CA
March 5, 2021; 7:00 p.m., Spectrum Sports		UC Davis	W 70–60	8–6 (7–5)	16 – Atwell	12 – Imai	4 – Imai	Stan Sheriff Center; Honolulu, HI
March 6, 2021; 6:00 p.m., Spectrum Sports		UC Davis	L 46–54	8–7 (7–6)	13 – Davies	9 – Tied	3 – Imai	Stan Sheriff Center; Honolulu, HI
Big West tournament
March 10, 2021; 12:00 p.m., ESPN3	(5)	vs. (4) Cal State Bakersfield; Quarterfinals	W 81–67	9–7	17 – Alexander	9 – Phillips	3 – Phillips	Michelob Ultra Arena; Paradise, NV
March 12, 2021; 10:00 a.m., ESPN3	(5)	vs. (1) UC Davis; Semifinals	L 52–64	9–8	14 – Atwell	8 – Atwell	2 – Phillips	Michelob Ultra Arena; Paradise, NV
*Non-conference game. ^{#}Rankings from AP poll. (#) Tournament seedings in parentheses. All times are in Hawaii–Aleutian. Source:
