= Vince Goo =

American basketball coach

Biographical details
- Born: January 16, 1947 (age 79); Honolulu, Hawaii, U.S.
- Education: Southern Oregon State (B.S.)

Coaching career (HC unless noted)

Men's basketball
- 1969–1971: Castle HS (JV)
- 1971–1977: Castle HS
- 1977–1979: Kaiser HS (HI) (asst.)
- 1979–1984: Kaiser HS

Women's basketball
- 1984–1987: Hawaii (asst.)
- 1987–2004: Hawaii

Head coaching record
- Overall: 334–116 (.742) (college)
- Tournaments: 1–4 (NCAA); 4–4 (WNIT); 2–1 (NWIT)

Accomplishments and honors

Championships
- 2 x Big West regular season (1993, 1994); WAC regular season (1998); Big West tournament (1996)

Awards
- 3× Big West Coach of the Year (1989, 1993, 1994)

Vince Goo (born January 16, 1947) is an American former basketball coach who was most recently the head coach of the women's basketball team at the University of Hawaiʻi at Mānoa. He is the winningest coach in program history with a record of 334–116 (.742).

The son of former Hawaii Rainbow Warriors basketball coach Ah Chew Goo, Goo got his start coaching men's basketball at the high school level in Hawaii, coaching the junior varsity squad at Castle High School for two years before being named the varsity coach. He later coached the varsity team at Kaiser High School, spending the first two seasons as an assistant before being promoted to head coach.

Goo joined the women's basketball staff at Hawaii as an assistant under Bill Nepfel, and was promoted to head coach before the 1987–88 season. Under Goo, the Rainbow Wahine made five NCAA tournaments and four WNIT tournaments, and all 41 players who completed their eligibility at Hawaii playing for him all completed their degrees.

Goo announced he would retire from coaching at the end of the 2004 season after the Rainbow Wahine had their worst season under him.

Goo currently resides in Hawaii Kai with his wife Gay; he and his wife have four children.

== Head coaching record ==
Record table
Season	Team	Overall	Conference	Standing	Postseason
Hawaii Rainbow Wahine (Pacific Conference Athletic Association) (1987–1988)
1987–88	Hawaii	14–14	8–10	7th	
Hawaii Rainbow Wahine (Big West Conference) (1988–1996)
1988–89	Hawaii	20–10	13–5	T–2nd	NCAA Division I Round of 48
1989–90	Hawaii	26–4	16–2	2nd	NCAA Division I Round of 24
1990–91	Hawaii	12–15	6–12	8th	
1991–92	Hawaii	25–7	13–5	T–2nd	NWIT Final
1992–93	Hawaii	28–4	17–1	1st	
1993–94	Hawaii	25–5	16–2	1st	NCAA Division I Round of 64
1994–95	Hawaii	6–20	4–14	9th	
1995–96	Hawaii	23–6	15–3	2nd	NCAA Division I Round of 64
Hawaii Rainbow Wahine (Western Athletic Conference) (1996–2004)
1996–97	Hawaii	21–8	12–4	T–2nd	
1997–98	Hawaii	24–4	13–1	1st	NCAA Division I Round of 64
1998–99	Hawaii	17–10	9–5	T–3rd	
1999–2000	Hawaii	20–9	11–3	2nd	WNIT first round
2000–01	Hawaii	26–8	12–4	2nd	WNIT Semifinals
2001–02	Hawaii	23–8	14–4	T–2nd	WNIT First Round
2002–03	Hawaii	16–14	9–9	T–4th	WNIT First Round
2003–04	Hawaii	8–20	6–12	8th	
Hawaii:		334–116 (.742)	194–96 (.669)		
Total:		334–116 (.742)			
National champion Postseason invitational champion Conference regular season champion Conference regular season and conference tournament champion Division regular season champion Division regular season and conference tournament champion Conference tournament champion
