= 2022–23 LSU Tigers women's basketball team =

American college basketball season

2022–23 LSU Tigers women's basketball

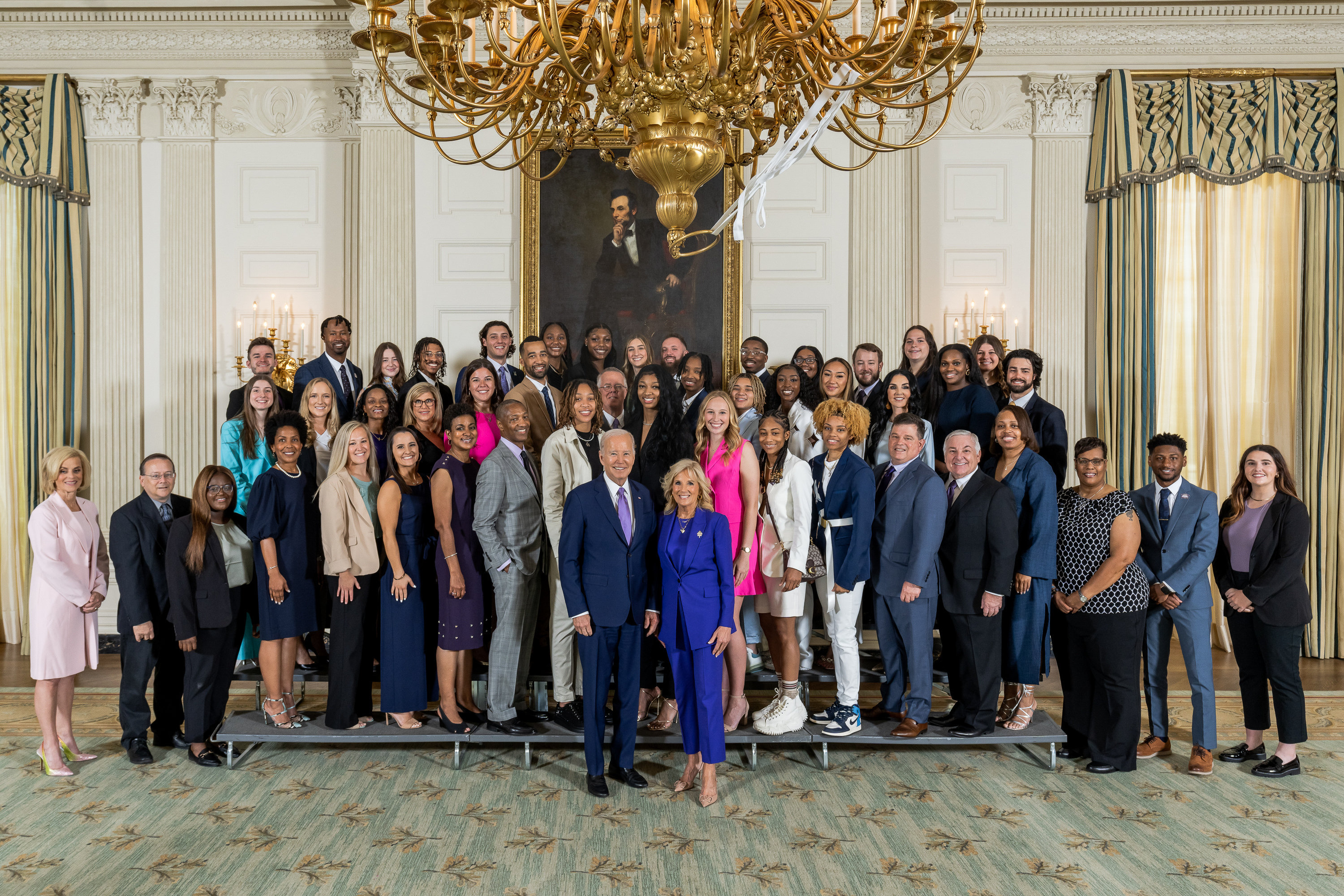

NCAA Tournament National Champions
- Conference: Southeastern Conference

Ranking
- Coaches: No. 1
- AP: No. 9
- Record: 34–2 (15–1 SEC)
- Head coach: Kim Mulkey (2nd season)
- Associate head coach: Bob Starkey
- Assistant coaches: Daphne Mitchell; Gary Redus II
- Home arena: Pete Maravich Assembly Center

2022–23 SEC women's basketball standings
	Conf.				Overall
Team	W		L	PCT	W		L	PCT
No. 1 South Carolina†	16	–	0	1.000	36	–	1	.973
No. 9 LSU	15	–	1	.938	34	–	2	.944
No. 24 Tennessee	13	–	3	.813	25	–	12	.676
Ole Miss	11	–	5	.688	25	–	9	.735
Mississippi State	9	–	7	.563	22	–	11	.667
Georgia	9	–	7	.563	22	–	12	.647
Alabama	9	–	7	.563	20	–	11	.645
Arkansas	7	–	9	.438	24	–	13	.649
Missouri	6	–	10	.375	18	–	14	.563
Florida	5	–	11	.313	19	–	14	.576
Auburn	5	–	11	.313	16	–	15	.516
Vanderbilt	3	–	13	.188	12	–	19	.387
Kentucky	2	–	14	.125	12	–	19	.387
Texas A&M	2	–	14	.125	9	–	20	.310
† 2023 SEC tournament winner As of April 2, 2023; Rankings from AP poll

The 2022–23 LSU Tigers women's basketball team represented Louisiana State University in the 2022–23 college basketball season. Led by second year head coach Kim Mulkey, the team played their games at Pete Maravich Assembly Center and are members of the Southeastern Conference. This team achieved numerous milestones for LSU women's basketball, including the team's first ever national championship and Final Four wins.

== Previous season ==
The Tigers finished the season 26–6 (13–3 SEC) to finish second in the conference. They lost in the quarterfinals of SEC women's tournament. They received an at-large bid to the NCAA women's tournament as a 3rd seed in the Spokane regional where they defeated Jackson State in the first round before losing to Ohio State in the second round.

== Offseason ==
=== Departures ===
LSU Departures
Name	Number	Pos.	Height	Year	Hometown	Reason for departure
Autumn Newby	0	F	6'2"	(redshirt) Senior	Lawrenceville, GA	Graduated
Jailin Cherry	1	G	5'8"	(redshirt) Senior	Pascagoula, MS	Graduated
Khayla Pointer	3	G	5'7"	(redshirt) Senior	Marietta, GA	Graduated/2022 WNBA draft; selected 13th overall by Las Vegas Aces
Ryann Payne	10	G	5'7"	Senior	Valencia, CA	Quit the team to focus on academics
Logyn McNeil	13	F	6'3"	Freshman	Rockwall, TX	Transferred to Houston
Sarah Shematsi	14	G/F	6'2"	Senior	Annecy, France	Graduate transferred to Kansas State
Ajae Petty	15	F	6'3"	Sophomore	Baltimore, MD	Transferred to Kentucky
Timia Ware	21	G	5'6"	Freshman	Chicago, IL	TBD
Faustine Aifuwa	24	C	6'5"	(redshirt) Senior	Dacula, GA	Graduated/2022 WNBA draft; selected 35th overall by Las Vegas Aces
Grace Hall	30	F	6'1"	Freshman	Homewood, IL	Transferred to Wabash Valley College
Awa Trasi	32	F	6'1"	(redshirt) Senior	Toulouse, France	Graduated

=== Incoming transfers ===
LSU incoming transfers
Name	Number	Pos.	Height	Year	Hometown	Previous school
LaDazhia Williams	0	F	6'4"	GS Senior	Bradenton, FL	Missouri
Jasmine Carson	2	G	5'10"	GS Senior	Memphis, TN	West Virginia
Angel Reese	10	F	6'3"	Sophomore	Baltimore, MD	Maryland
Last-Tear Poa	13	G	5'11"	Sophomore	Melbourne, Australia	Northwest Florida State College
Kateri Poole	55	G	5'8"	Sophomore	Bronx, NY	Ohio State

=== 2022 recruiting class ===
College recruiting information
Name	Hometown	School	Height	Weight	Commit date
Flau'jae Johnson; G	Marietta, GA	Sprayberry HS	5 ft 10 in (1.78 m)	N/A	
Flau'jae Johnson; G	Recruit ratings: ESPN: (95)				
Sa'Myah Smith; F	DeSoto, TX	DeSoto HS	6 ft 2 in (1.88 m)	N/A	
Sa'Myah Smith; F	Recruit ratings: ESPN: (94)				
Overall recruit ranking:
Note: In many cases, Scout, Rivals, 247Sports, On3, and ESPN may conflict in their listings of height and weight.; In these cases, the average was taken. ESPN grades are on a 100-point scale.; Sources: "2022 Player Commits". ESPN.

== Roster ==
2022–23 LSU Tigers women's basketball team
Players
Coaches

Pos.	#	Name	Height	Year	Previous school	Hometown
F	0	LaDazhia Williams	6 ft 4 in (1.93 m)	GS	Lakewood Ranch HS; Missouri	Bradenton, FL
G	2	Jasmine Carson	5 ft 10 in (1.78 m)	GS	McEachern HS; West Virginia	Memphis, TN
G	4	Flau'jae Johnson	5 ft 10 in (1.78 m)	Fr	Sprayberry HS	Savannah, GA
F	5	Sa'Myah Smith	6 ft 2 in (1.88 m)	Fr	DeSoto HS	DeSoto, TX
F	10	Angel Reese	6 ft 3 in (1.91 m)	Jr	St. Frances Academy; Maryland	Baltimore, MD
F	11	Emily Ward	5 ft 11 in (1.8 m)	Sr	Benton HS	Bossier City, LA
G	13	Last-Tear Poa	5 ft 11 in (1.8 m)	So	UC Senior Secondary College; Northwest Florida State College	Melbourne, Australia
G	14	Izzy Besselman	5 ft 10 in (1.78 m)	Fr	Episcopal HS	Baton Rouge, LA
F	15	Alisa Williams	6 ft 2 in (1.88 m)	Fr	Braswell HS	Denton, TX
C	20	Hannah Gusters (T)	6 ft 5 in (1.96 m)	Jr	MacArthur HS; Baylor	Dallas, TX
F	23	Amani Bartlett	6 ft 3 in (1.91 m)	So	Houston Christian HS	Cleveland, TX
G	45	Alexis Morris	5 ft 6 in (1.68 m)	RS Sr	Legacy Christian Academy; Texas A&M	Beaumont, TX
G	55	Kateri Poole	5 ft 8 in (1.73 m)	So	South Shore HS; Ohio State	Bronx, NY

Head coach

- Kim Mulkey (Louisiana Tech)

Assistant coach(es)

- Bob Starkey
- Daphne Mitchell (Georgia Tech)
- Gary Redus II (South Alabama)

Legend

- (C) Team captain
- (S) Suspended
- (I) Ineligible
- (W) Walk-on
- Injured
- Current redshirt

Roster

== Schedule and results ==
Date time, TV	Rank^{#}	Opponent^{#}	Result	Record	Site (attendance) city, state
Exhibition
October 27, 2022*; 7:00 p.m., SECN+	No. 16	Mississippi College	W 88–35		Pete Maravich Assembly Center (1,385); Baton Rouge, LA
November 3, 2022*; 7:00 p.m., SECN+	No. 16	Langston	W 121–46		Pete Maravich Assembly Center (1,254); Baton Rouge, LA
Non-conference regular season
November 7, 2022*; 7:00 p.m., SECN+	No. 16	Bellarmine	W 125–50	1–0	Pete Maravich Assembly Center (6,109); Baton Rouge, LA
November 11, 2022*; 7:00 p.m., SECN+	No. 16	Mississippi Valley State	W 111–41	2–0	Pete Maravich Assembly Center (6,009); Baton Rouge, LA
November 13, 2022*; 3:00 p.m., SECN	No. 16	Western Carolina	W 107–34	3–0	Pete Maravich Assembly Center (6,618); Baton Rouge, LA
November 16, 2022*; 11:00 a.m., SECN+	No. 15	Houston Christian	W 101–47	4–0	Pete Maravich Assembly Center (12,498); Baton Rouge, LA
November 20, 2022*; 2:00 p.m., SECN+	No. 15	Northwestern State	W 100–45	5–0	Pete Maravich Assembly Center (5,318); Baton Rouge, LA
November 24, 2022*; 1:00 p.m.	No. 12	vs. George Mason; Goombay Splash	W 80–52	6–0	Gateway Christian Academy (255); Bimini, Bahamas
November 26, 2022*; 1:00 p.m., FloSports	No. 12	vs. UAB; Goombay Splash	W 99–64	7–0	Gateway Christian Academy (259); Bimini, Bahamas
November 29, 2022*; 7:00 p.m., SECN+	No. 11	Southeastern Louisiana	W 63–55	8–0	Pete Maravich Assembly Center (6,592); Baton Rouge, LA
December 4, 2022*; 4:00 p.m., ESPN+	No. 11	at Tulane	W 85–72	9–0	Devlin Fieldhouse (1,592); New Orleans, LA
December 14, 2022*; 7:00 p.m., SECN+	No. 11	Lamar	W 88–42	10–0	Pete Maravich Assembly Center (5,654); Baton Rouge, LA
December 17, 2022*; 10:00 p.m.	No. 11	vs. Montana State; Maui Classic	W 91–52	11–0	South Maui Gymnasium; Maui, HI
December 18, 2022*; 10:00 p.m.	No. 11	vs. Oregon State; Maui Classic	W 87–55	12–0	South Maui Gymnasium; Maui, HI
SEC regular season
December 29, 2022; 6:00 p.m., ESPN2	No. 9	at No. 24 Arkansas	W 69–45	13–0 (1–0)	Bud Walton Arena (5,285); Fayetteville, AR
January 1, 2023; 2:00 p.m., SECN+	No. 9	Vanderbilt	W 88–63	14–0 (2–0)	Pete Maravich Assembly Center (7,285); Baton Rouge, LA
January 5, 2023; 8:00 p.m., SECN	No. 7	Texas A&M	W 74–34	15–0 (3–0)	Pete Maravich Assembly Center (6,549); Baton Rouge, LA
January 8, 2023; 1:00 p.m., SECN+	No. 7	at Kentucky	W 67–48	16–0 (4–0)	Memorial Coliseum (3,410); Lexington, KY
January 12, 2023; 6:00 p.m., SECN	No. 5	at Missouri	W 77–57	17–0 (5–0)	Mizzou Arena (2,791); Columbia, MO
January 15, 2023; 2:00 p.m., SECN+	No. 5	Auburn	W 84–54	18–0 (6–0)	Pete Maravich Assembly Center (11,475); Baton Rouge, LA
January 19, 2023; 8:00 p.m., SECN	No. 3	Arkansas	W 79–76	19–0 (7–0)	Pete Maravich Assembly Center (7,293); Baton Rouge, LA
January 23, 2023; 6:00 p.m., SEC	No. 4	at Alabama	W 89–51	20–0 (8–0)	Coleman Coliseum (2,586); Tuscaloosa, AL
January 30, 2023; 6:00 p.m., ESPN2	No. 3	Tennessee	W 76–68	21–0 (9–0)	Pete Maravich Assembly Center (15,157); Baton Rouge, LA
February 2, 2023; 7:00 p.m., SECN+	No. 3	Georgia	W 82–77 ^{OT}	22–0 (10–0)	Pete Maravich Assembly Center (8,716); Baton Rouge, LA
February 5, 2023; 1:00 p.m., ESPN2	No. 3	at Texas A&M	W 72–66	23–0 (11–0)	Reed Arena (6,482); College Station, TX
February 12, 2023; 2:00 p.m., ESPN	No. 3	at No. 1 South Carolina	L 64–88	23–1 (11–1)	Colonial Life Arena (18,000); Columbia, SC
February 16, 2023; 8:00 p.m., SECN	No. 5	Ole Miss	W 69–60	24–1 (12–1)	Pete Maravich Assembly Center (8,753); Baton Rouge, LA
February 19, 2023; 1:00 p.m., SECN	No. 5	at Florida	W 90–79	25–1 (13–1)	O'Connell Center (3,498); Gainesville, FL
February 23, 2023; 6:30 p.m., SECN+	No. 5	at Vanderbilt	W 82–63	26–1 (14–1)	Memorial Gymnasium (3,274); Nashville, TN
February 26, 2023; 5:00 p.m., SECN	No. 5	Mississippi State	W 74–59	27–1 (15–1)	Pete Maravich Assembly Center (15,721); Baton Rouge, LA
SEC Tournament
March 3, 2023; 5:00 p.m., SECN	(2) No. 4	vs. (7) Georgia; Quarterfinals	W 83–66	28–1	Bon Secours Wellness Arena; Greenville, SC
March 4, 2023; 6:00 p.m., ESPNU	(2) No. 4	vs. (3) Tennessee; Semifinals	L 67–69	28–2	Bon Secours Wellness Arena (10,471); Greenville, SC
NCAA Tournament
March 17, 2023*; 4:30 p.m., ESPN2	(3 G2) No. 9	(14 G2) Hawaiʻi; First round	W 73–50	29–2	Pete Maravich Assembly Center (8,608); Baton Rouge, LA
March 19, 2023*; 6:30 p.m., ESPN	(3 G2) No. 9	(6 G2) No. 18 Michigan; Second round	W 66–42	30–2	Pete Maravich Assembly Center (10,108); Baton Rouge, LA
March 24, 2023*; 4:00 p.m., ESPN	(3 G2) No. 9	vs. (2 G2) No. 8 Utah; Sweet Sixteen	W 66–63	31–2	Bon Secours Wellness Arena; Greenville, SC
March 26, 2023*; 7:00 p.m., ESPN	(3 G2) No. 9	vs. (9 G2) Miami (FL); Elite Eight	W 54–42	32–2	Bon Secours Wellness Arena (7,988); Greenville, SC
March 31, 2023*; 6:00 p.m., ESPN	(3 G2) No. 9	vs. (1 S3) No. 4 Virginia Tech; Final Four	W 79–72	33–2	American Airlines Center; Dallas, TX
April 2, 2023*; 3:30 p.m., ABC	(3 G2) No. 9	vs. (2 S4) No. 3 Iowa; Championship	W 102–85	34–2	American Airlines Center (19,482); Dallas, TX
*Non-conference game. ^{#}Rankings from AP Poll. (#) Tournament seedings in parentheses. G2=Greenville 2 S3=Seattle 3. All times are in Central.

== Rankings ==
Ranking movements Legend: ██ Increase in ranking ██ Decrease in ranking т = Tied with team above or below ( ) = First-place votes
	Week																				
Poll	Pre	1	2	3	4	5	6	7	8	9	10	11	12	13	14	15	16	17	18	19	Final
AP	16	16	15	12	11	11	11	10	9	7	5	3	4	3	3	5	5	4	9	9	Not released
Coaches	14	14	15	13	12	11	10	10	9	6	5	4	3	3	2	4	4	3	4т	6	1 (30)

== See also ==
- 2022–23 LSU Tigers men's basketball team
