= 2021 Big West Conference women's basketball tournament =

American collegiate tournament

- Classification: Division I
- Season: 2020–21
- Teams: 9
- Site: Michelob Ultra Arena; Paradise, Nevada
- Champions: UC Davis (3rd title)
- Winning coach: Jennifer Gross (3rd title)
- Television: ESPN3

2020–21 Big West women's basketball standings
	Conf.				Overall
Team	W		L	PCT	W		L	PCT
UC Davis †	9	–	1	.900	13	–	3	.813
UC Irvine	11	–	4	.733	15	–	9	.625
Long Beach State	11	–	7	.611	12	–	9	.571
Hawaiʻi	7	–	6	.538	9	–	8	.529
Cal State Bakersfield	7	–	6	.538	9	–	9	.500
Cal Poly	8	–	8	.500	13	–	11	.542
UC Santa Barbara	7	–	9	.438	7	–	14	.333
UC San Diego*	6	–	9	.400	6	–	9	.400
UC Riverside	5	–	9	.357	7	–	12	.368
Cal State Fullerton	2	–	14	.125	4	–	18	.182
† 2021 Big West tournament winner * ineligible for the 2021 NCAA tournament due to transition period Rankings from AP poll NOTE: Cal State Northridge will not play in the 2020–21 season due to COVID-19 concerns.

The 2021 Big West Conference women's basketball tournament (officially known as the Air Force Reserve Big West Women's Basketball Championship due to sponsorship reasons) was the postseason women's basketball tournament for the 2020–21 season in the Big West Conference. The tournament was held March 9–13, 2021. The tournament winner received an automatic invitation to the 2021 NCAA Division I women's basketball tournament. UC Davis won the conference tournament championship game over UC Irvine, 61–42.

== Seeds ==
Teams are seeded by record within the conference, with a tie–breaker system to seed teams with identical conference records. Only the top nine teams in the conference will qualify for the tournament.

Seed	School	Conference	Tiebreaker 1
1	UC Davis	9–1	
2	UC Irvine	11–4	
3	Long Beach State	11–7	
4	CSU Bakersfield	7–6	2–0 vs. Hawai'i
5	Hawai'i	7–6	0–2 vs. CSUB
6	Cal Poly	8–8	
7	UC Santa Barbara	7–9	
8	UC Riverside	5–9	
9	Cal State Fullerton	2–14	

== Schedule ==
Game	Time*	Matchup^{#}	Score	Television
First round – Tuesday, March 9, 2021
1	12:00 p.m.	No. 8 UC Riverside vs. No. 9 Cal State Fullerton	51-55	ESPN3
Quarterfinals – Wednesday, March 10, 2021
2	11:00 a.m.	No. 1 UC Davis vs. No. 9 Cal State Fullerton	61-54	ESPN3
3	2:00 p.m.	No. 4 CSU Bakersfield vs. No. 5 Hawai'i	67-81	ESPN3
4	5:00 p.m.	No. 2 UC Irvine vs. No. 7 UC Santa Barbara	92-90	ESPN3
5	8:00 p.m.	No. 3 Long Beach State vs. No. 6 Cal Poly	60-61	ESPN3
Semifinals – Friday, March 12, 2021
6	12:00 p.m.	No. 5 Hawai'i vs. No. 1 UC Davis	52-64	ESPN3
7	3:00 p.m.	No. 6 Cal Poly vs. No. 2 UC Irvine	59-68	ESPN3
Championship – Saturday, March 13, 2021
8	5:00 p.m.	No. 1 UC Davis vs. No. 2 UC Irvine	61-42	ESPN3
*All times Pacific. ^{#}Rankings denote tournament seeding.

== Bracket ==
First round Tuesday, March 9
8	UC Riverside	51
9	Cal State Fullerton	55

Quarterfinals; Wednesday, March 10
1	UC Davis	61
9	Cal State Fullerton	54
4	CSU Bakersfield	67
5	Hawai'i	81
7	UC Santa Barbara	90
2	UC Irvine	92
3	Long Beach State	60
6	Cal Poly	61

Semifinals; Friday, March 12
1	UC Davis	64
5	Hawai'i	52
2	UC Irvine	68
6	Cal Poly	59

Championship; Saturday, March 13
1	UC Davis	61
2	UC Irvine	42

== See also ==
- 2021 Big West Conference men's basketball tournament
- Big West Conference women's basketball tournament
