= Laura Beeman =

American college basketball coach

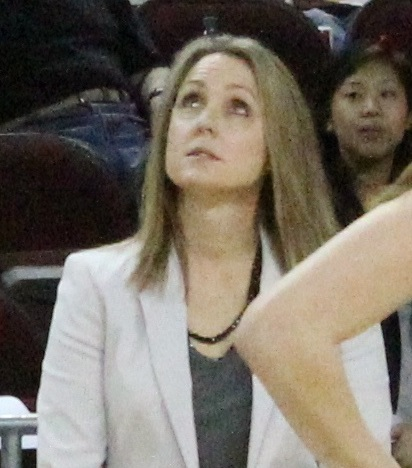
- Beeman in 2011

Current position
- Title: Associate athletics director
- Team: Hawaii
- Annual salary: $190,008

Biographical details
- Born: April 16, 1968 (age 58); San Bernardino, California, U.S.

Playing career
- 1987–1988: UC Riverside
- 1989–1991: Cal State San Bernardino
- Position: Guard

Coaching career (HC unless noted)
- 1992–1994: Redlands (asst.)
- 1994–1995: Mt. San Antonio (asst.)
- 1995–2010: Mt. San Antonio
- 2008–2009: Los Angeles Sparks (asst.)
- 2010–2012: USC (asst.)
- 2012–2026: Hawaii

Administrative career (AD unless noted)
- 2026–present: Hawaii (associate AD)

Head coaching record
- Overall: 244–180 (.575) (college); 390–110 (.780) (junior college)
- Tournaments: 0–3 (NCAA); 0–4 (WNIT); 0–2 (WBIT)

Accomplishments and honors

Championships
- 4× CCCAA (2004, 2006–08); 4× Big West regular season (2015, 2022, 2024, 2025); 3× Big West tournament (2016, 2022, 2023)

Awards
- 4× Big West Coach of the Year (2015, 2022, 2024, 2025)

Laura Lynne Beeman (born April 16, 1968) is a retired American college basketball coach who was the head women's basketball coach at the University of Hawaii from 2012 to 2026. Beeman is currently the associate athletics director for student-athlete success at Hawaii, a role she was appointed to in May 2026.

== Early life and education ==
Born and raised in San Bernardino, California, Beeman attended San Gorgonio High School in ninth grade before transferring to San Bernardino High School and graduating in 1986. She redshirted a year due to a knee injury, then played 24 games for then-Division II UC Riverside in the 1987–88 season under coach Nancy Simpson. Beeman averaged 2.1 points and 1.2 rebounds.

Beeman then transferred to then-Division III Cal State San Bernardino and played from 1989 to 1991. As a sophomore in 1989–90, Beeman averaged 7.3 points and 3.0 rebounds and helped Cal State San Bernardino to a 24–4 season and a berth in the NCAA Tournament. In 1990–91, her junior year, Beeman averaged 6.5 points and 3.7 rebounds. Beeman left the team after that season and graduated with a degree in business marketing in 1992.

== Coaching career ==
Also enrolling as a graduate student, Beeman became a women's basketball assistant coach at the University of Redlands in 1992. She completed her M.Ed. in counseling in 1994.

At the junior college level, Beeman became a women's basketball assistant coach at Mt. San Antonio College in 1994. She also enrolled at Azusa Pacific University that year and earned a master's degree in physical education in 1996. Beeman also was promoted to head coach at Mt. San Antonio in 1995. At Mt. San Antonio, Beeman led the program to four CCCAA titles (2004, 2006, 2007, 2008), ten South Coast Conference titles, and a 390–110 record in 15 seasons from 1995 to 2010.

Beeman was an assistant coach for the Los Angeles Sparks of the WNBA under Michael Cooper in the 2008 and 2009 seasons. From 2010 to 2012, Beeman was an assistant coach at USC, again under Cooper.

In 2012, the University of Hawaii at Manoa hired Beeman as head coach for Hawaii Rainbow Wahine basketball. In eleven seasons, Beeman led Hawai'i to four WNIT appearances (2013, 2014, 2015, 2019) and three NCAA tournament appearances (2016, 2022, 2023). Hawaii won the Big West Conference regular season title in 2015, 2022 and 2024 and Big West tournament in 2016, 2022 and 2023.

Beeman announced her retirement from coaching after the 2025–26 season.

== Head coaching record ==
=== NCAA ===
Record table
Season	Team	Overall	Conference	Standing	Postseason
Hawaii Rainbow Wahine (Big West Conference) (2012–2026)
2012–13	Hawai'i	17–14	13–5	T–2nd	WNIT First Round
2013–14	Hawai'i	17–14	10–6	3rd	WNIT First Round
2014–15	Hawai'i	23–9	14–2	1st	WNIT First Round
2015–16	Hawai'i	21–11	12–4	T–2nd	NCAA First Round
2016–17	Hawai'i	12–18	7–9	T–6th	
2017–18	Hawai'i	12–18	5–11	8th	
2018–19	Hawai'i	15–17	10–6	T–2nd	WNIT First Round
2019–20	Hawai'i	16–14	9–7	T–2nd	
2020–21	Hawai'i	9–8	7–6	5th	
2021–22	Hawai'i	20–10	13–3	1st	NCAA First Round
2022–23	Hawai'i	18–15	13–7	3rd	NCAA First Round
2023–24	Hawai'i	20–11	17–3	1st	WBIT First Round
2024–25	Hawai'i	22–10	16–4	1st	WBIT First Round
2025–26	Hawai'i	22–11	14–6	4th	
Hawaii:		244–180 (.575)	160–79 (.669)		
Total:		244–180 (.575)			
National champion Postseason invitational champion Conference regular season champion Conference regular season and conference tournament champion Division regular season champion Division regular season and conference tournament champion Conference tournament champion
