= Penrhos College, Perth =

School in Como, Western Australia

Penrhos College

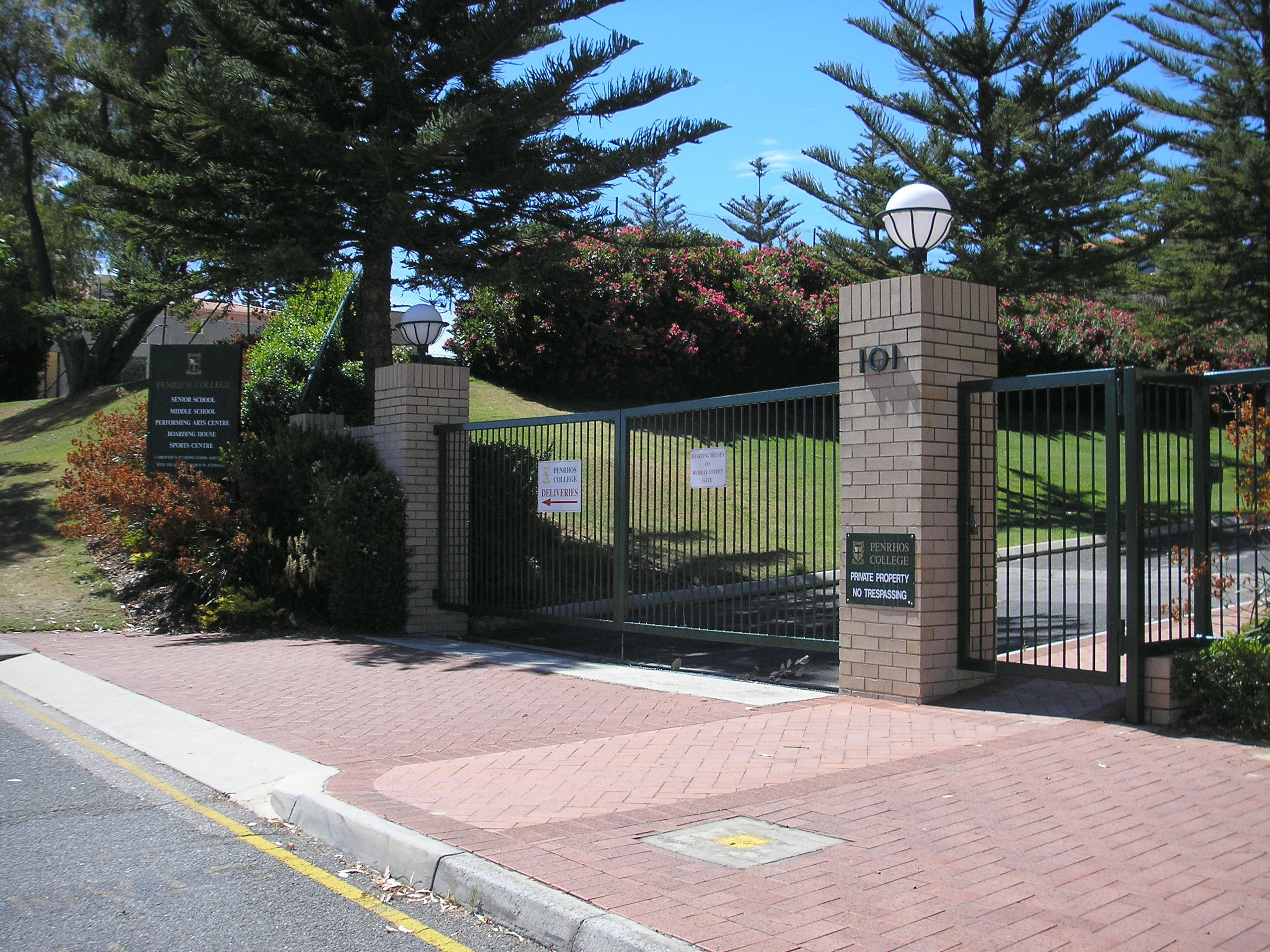
- Entrance to the College, in 2006

Location
- Como, Perth, Western Australia; Australia; 31°59′50″S 115°52′19″E

Information
- Former name: Methodist Ladies' College, South Perth
- Type: Independent single-sex primary and secondary day and boarding school
- Motto: Strive for the Highest
- Denomination: Uniting Church
- Established: 1952; 74 years ago
- Educational authority: WA Department of Education
- Principal: Ms Kalea Haran
- Employees: ~121
- Years: K–12
- Gender: Girls
- Enrolment: ~1,400 (2007)
- Area: 8 hectares (20 acres)
- Campus type: Suburban
- Colours: Green, gold and white
- Athletics: Independent Girls Schools Sports Association
- Affiliations: Association of Heads of Independent Schools of Australia; Junior School Heads Association of Australia; Australian Boarding Schools' Association; Alliance of Girls' Schools Australasia
- Brother school: Wesley College
- Website: www.penrhos.wa.edu.au

Penrhos College is an independent Uniting Church single-sex primary and secondary day and boarding school for girls, located in Como, a southern suburb of Perth, Western Australia.

Founded in 1952 as the Methodist Ladies' College, South Perth, Penrhos has a non-selective enrolment policy and currently caters for approximately 1,400 students from Kindergarten to Year 12, including 105 boarders in Years 7 to 12.

The college is affiliated with the Association of Heads of Independent Schools of Australia (AHISA), the Junior School Heads Association of Australia (JSHAA), the Australian Boarding Schools' Association (ABSA), the Alliance of Girls' Schools Australasia (AGSA), and is a member of the Independent Girls Schools Sports Association (IGSSA). The school takes pride in its 17 consecutive wins in the IGSSA athletics, and almost as many in the cross country and swimming events.

Penrhos College's brother school is Wesley College located in South Perth.

== History ==
Penrhos College was established in 1952 as the Methodist Ladies' College, South Perth and was originally located on Angelo Street, South Perth across from the Perth Zoo. The school moved to its present site in Como, 6 kilometres (3.7 mi) south of Perth, in 1971. The school was originally a subdivision of the Methodist Ladies' College, Claremont (1907), but both now operate independently. It educates from pre-kindergarten to year 12.

In 1977, the Methodist Ladies' College, South Perth was awarded to the Uniting Church in Australia following Church Union, and became known as Penrhos College. The school's new name was drawn from Penrhos College, in Colwyn Bay, North Wales, which was established in 1880 by the Methodist Church, for the special education of girls. Penrhos is a Welsh word meaning "Peak of the Moor".

== Campus ==
Penrhos College is situated on a single suburban campus in an elevated position, on a former pine plantation. The school is 8 hectares (20 acres) in size, featuring a parkland setting and modern cream brick and terracotta-tiled buildings.

== Academics ==
The school has had consistently good WACE results and appears regularly in the top 30 schools for the WACE.

Year	% +75 in WACE (Note: Based on the number of Stage 3 course enrolments in the school where a WACE course score of 75 or above was achieved)	State ranking (Note: Ranking of school compared to other schools in the state)	% +65 in WACE (Note: Based on the number of Stage 3 course enrolments in the school where a WACE course score of 65 or above was achieved)	State ranking	% graduation (Note: Percentage of Year 12 cohort that graduated with a WACE certificate)
2014	28.15	9	54.73	11	99.1
2013	20.79	9	52.06	9	99.33
2012	27.64	6	57.76	9	100
2011	16.24	29	56.75	16	100
2010	29.77	7	66.83	7	100
2009		3		9	100

== Alumni ==
Alumni of Penrhos College are known as Old Girls and may elect to join the school's alumni association, The Penrhos College Alumni Inc. Some notable Penrhos Old Girls include:

- Kate Atkinson – actress
- Amber Bradley – rower; world champion and Olympian
- Haylie Ecker – first violin of classical string quartet 'Bond'
- Tessa Parkinson – sailor; competed in Olympics
- Amanda Platell – journalist and television presenter
- Rabia Siddique – international humanitarian and criminal lawyer, terrorism prosecutor, former senior officer in the British Army, professional public speaker, author
- Zoe Ventoura – actress
- Maddie Phillips – actress

== See also ==
- List of schools in the Perth metropolitan area
- List of boarding schools in Australia
- Methodism
