= Hawaii Rainbow Wahine basketball =

Women's college basketball team

2026–27 Hawaii Rainbow Wahine basketball team
- University: University of Hawaiʻi at Mānoa
- Athletic director: Matt Elliott
- Head coach: Khalilah Mitchell (1st season)
- Location: Honolulu, Hawaii
- Arena: SimpliFi Arena at the Stan Sheriff Center (capacity: 10,000)
- Conference: Mountain West
- Nickname: Rainbow Wahine
- Colors: Green, black, silver, and white

NCAA Division I tournament round of 32
- 1990

NCAA Division I tournament appearances
- 1989, 1990, 1994, 1996, 1998, 2016, 2022, 2023

Conference tournament champions
- 1996, 2016, 2022, 2023

Conference regular-season champions
- Big West: 1993, 1994, 2015, 2022, 2024, 2025; WAC: 1998

Uniforms
Home	Away

The Hawaii Rainbow Wahine basketball team competes in the Mountain West Conference (MW) for the University of Hawaiʻi at Mānoa.

== Season-by-season results ==
Record table
Season	Coach	Overall	Conference	Standing	Postseason
Patsy Dung (1974–1979)
1974–75	Patsy Dung	4–2			
1975–76	Patsy Dung	5–2			
1976–77	Patsy Dung	4–4			
1977–78	Patsy Dung	7–6			
1978–79	Patsy Dung	11–6			
Patsy Dung:		31–20 (.608)			
Milo Griffin (1979–1982)
1979–1980	Milo Griffin	9–16			
1980–1981	Milo Griffin	8–15			
1981–1982	Milo Griffin	8–18			
Milo Griffin:		25–49 (.338)			
Jerry Busone (1982–1984)
1982–83	Jerry Busone	18–12			
1983–84	Jerry Busone	17–11			
Jerry Busone:		35–23 (.603)			
Bill Nepfel (Pacific Coast Athletic Association) (1984–1987)
1984–85	Bill Nepfel	20–12	2–6	4th	
1985–86	Bill Nepfel	12–16	5–9	6th	
1986–87	Bill Nepfel	21–7	13–5	2nd	
Bill Nepfel:		53–35 (.602)	20–20 (.500)		
Vince Goo (Pacific Coast Athletic Association) (1987–1988)
1987–88	Vince Goo	14–14	8–10	7th	
Vince Goo (Big West Conference) (1988–1996)
1988–89	Vince Goo	20–10	13–5	T–2nd	NCAA First Round
1989–90	Vince Goo	26–4	16–2	2nd	NCAA Second Round
1990–91	Vince Goo	12–15	6–12	8th	
1991–92	Vince Goo	25–7	13–5	T–2nd	NWIT Final
1992–93	Vince Goo	28–4	17–1	1st	
1993–94	Vince Goo	25–5	16–2	1st	NCAA First Round
1994–95	Vince Goo	6–20	4–14	9th	
1995–96	Vince Goo	23–6	15–3	2nd	NCAA First Round
Hawaii Rainbow Wahine (Western Athletic Conference) (1996–2004)
1996–97	Vince Goo	21–8	12–4	T–2nd	
1997–98	Vince Goo	24–4	13–1	1st	NCAA First Round
1998–99	Vince Goo	17–10	9–5	T–3rd	
1999–2000	Vince Goo	20–9	11–3	2nd	WNIT First Round
2000–01	Vince Goo	26–8	12–4	2nd	WNIT Semifinals
2001–02	Vince Goo	23–8	14–4	T–2nd	WNIT First Round
2002–03	Vince Goo	16–14	9–9	T–4th	WNIT First Round
2003–04	Vince Goo	8–20	6–12	8th	
Vince Goo:		334–116 (.742)	194–96 (.669)		
Jim Bolla (Western Athletic Conference) (2004–2009)
2004–05	Jim Bolla	11–15	7–11	7th	
2005–06	Jim Bolla	18–10	9–7	3rd	
2006–07	Jim Bolla	15–14	9–7	T–4th	
2007–08	Jim Bolla	12–18	6–10	6th	
2008–09	Jim Bolla	8–23	4–12	8th	
Jim Bolla:		64–80 (.444)	35–47 (.427)		
Dana Takahara-Dias (Western Athletic Conference) (2009–2012)
2009–10	Dana Takahara-Dias	10–20	6–8	8th	
2010–11	Dana Takahara-Dias	11–19	5–11	7th	
2011–12	Dana Takahara-Dias	11–19	6–8	6th	
Dana Takahara-Dias:		32–58 (.356)	17–27 (.386)		
Laura Beeman (Big West Conference) (2012–2026)
2012–13	Laura Beeman	17–14	13–5	T–2nd	WNIT First Round
2013–14	Laura Beeman	17–14	10–6	3rd	WNIT First Round
2014–15	Laura Beeman	23–9	14–2	1st	WNIT First Round
2015–16	Laura Beeman	21–11	12–4	T–2nd	NCAA First Round
2016–17	Laura Beeman	12–18	7–9	T–6th	
2017–18	Laura Beeman	12–18	5–11	8th	
2018–19	Laura Beeman	15–17	10–6	T–2nd	WNIT First Round
2019–20	Laura Beeman	16–14	9–7	T–2nd	
2020–21	Laura Beeman	9–8	7–6	5th	
2021–22	Laura Beeman	20–10	13–3	1st	NCAA First Round
2022–23	Laura Beeman	18–15	13–7	3rd	NCAA First Round
2023–24	Laura Beeman	20–11	17–3	1st	WBIT First Round
2024–25	Laura Beeman	22–10	16–4	1st	WBIT First Round
2025–26	Laura Beeman	22–11	14–6	4th	
Laura Beeman:		244–180 (.575)	160–79 (.669)		
Total:		818–561 (.593)			
National champion Postseason invitational champion Conference regular season champion Conference regular season and conference tournament champion Division regular season champion Division regular season and conference tournament champion Conference tournament champion

== Postseason appearances ==
=== NCAA Tournament appearances ===
The Rainbow Wahine have appeared in eight NCAA Tournaments, with a combined record of 1–8.

Year	Seed	Round	Opponent	Result
1989	12	First round	(5) Washington	L 79–87
1990	9	First round Second round	(8) Montana (1) Stanford	W 83–78; L 76–106
1994	12	First round	(5) San Diego State	L 75–81
1996	11	First round	(6) Auburn	L 53–73
1998	8	First round	(9) Arkansas	L 70–76
2016	14	First round	(3) UCLA	L 50–66
2022	15	First round	(2) Baylor	L 49–89
2023	14	First round	(3) LSU	L 50-73

=== WBIT appearances ===
The Rainbow Wahine have appeared in two Women's Basketball Invitation Tournaments, with a record of 0–2.

Year	Seed	Round	Opponent	Result
2024		First round	(2) California	L 60–65
2025		First round	(2) UNLV	L 46–63

=== WNIT appearances ===
The Rainbow Wahine have appeared in eight Women's National Invitation Tournaments, with a combined record of 3–8.

Year	Round	Opponent	Result
2000	First round	Saint Mary's	L 60–75
2001	First round Second round Quarterfinals; Semifinals	Santa Clara; BYU; Oklahoma State; New Mexico	W 73–57; W 77–73 ^{OT} W 52–51; L 43–68
2002	First round	Oregon State	L 50–62
2003	First round	Arizona State	L 44–57
2013	First round	San Diego	L 49–61
2014	First round	Washington	L 50–67
2015	First round	Saint Mary's	L 88–92 ^{OT}
2019	First round	Saint Mary's	L 67–43

=== NWIT appearances ===
The Rainbow Wahine competed in one National Women's Invitational Tournament in 1992 losing to Georgia Tech in the final 72—90.

Year	Round	Opponent	Result
1992	First round Semifinals; Final	Florida International; Arkansas State; Georgia Tech	W 83–73; W 83–73; L 72–90

== Retired numbers ==
The Rainbow Wahine retired their first number in 2015, honoring number 32 for the program's all-time leader in points and rebounds, Judy Mosley-McAfee.

Hawaii Rainbow Wahine retired numbers
No.	Player	Career	Year retired
32	Judy Mosley-McAfee	1986–1990	2015
