= CCAA men's basketball tournament =

US collegiate basketball tournament

- Conference basketball championship
- Sport: Basketball
- Conference: California Collegiate Athletic Association
- Number of teams: 8
- Format: Single-elimination tournament
- Current stadium: Fitzpatrick Arena
- Current location: Turlock, CA
- Played: 1986–1995, 2008–present
- Current champion: Cal State East Bay (1st)
- Most championships: Cal State Bakersfield (5); UC San Diego (5)
- Official website: CCAA men's basketball

The California Collegiate Athletic Association men's basketball tournament is the annual conference basketball championship tournament for the California Collegiate Athletic Association. The tournament was held annually between 1986 and 1995, discontinued between 1996 and 2007, and then held annually again after it was re-established in 2008. It is a single-elimination tournament and seeding is based on regular season records.

The winner, declared conference champion, receives the conference's automatic bid to the NCAA Men's Division II Basketball Championship.

== Tournament format ==
Between 1986 and 1995, the tournament consisted of 4 teams playing a single-elimination tournament on the campus of one of the four teams. After the tournament was re-established in 2008, the tournament expanded to eight teams; first round matches were played on campus sites while the semifinal and final rounds were both played at one single site. Between 2008 and 2012, this site rotated between different campus gyms. After 2013, however, the tournament has been played at a pre-determined neutral arena.

== Results ==
Year	Champion	Score	Runner-up	Venue
1986	UC Riverside	72–71	Cal Poly–SLO	Mott Athletic Center (San Luis Obispo, CA)
1987	Cal State Dominguez Hills	70–58	Cal Poly–SLO	Mott Athletic Center (San Luis Obispo, CA)
1988	Cal State Bakersfield	66–56	Cal Poly–SLO	Icardo Center (Bakersfield, CA)
1989	UC Riverside	87–83	Chapman	UC Riverside Gymnasium (Riverside, CA)
1990	Cal State Bakersfield	78–74	UC Riverside	Icardo Center (Bakersfield, CA)
1991	Cal State Bakersfield	85–74	Cal Poly Pomona	Icardo Center (Bakersfield, CA)
1992	Cal State Bakersfield	69–65	UC Riverside	Icardo Center (Bakersfield, CA)
1993	Cal State Bakersfield	64–61	UC Riverside	Icardo Center (Bakersfield, CA)
1994	UC Riverside	73–68	Cal State Bakersfield	UC Riverside Student Recreation Center (Riverside, CA)
1995	Grand Canyon	72–65	UC Riverside	UC Riverside Student Recreation Center (Riverside, CA)
Tournament discontinued between 1996 and 2007
2008	UC San Diego	64–56	Cal Poly Pomona	Icardo Center (Bakersfield, CA)
2009	Cal State San Bernardino	80–78	Cal State Monterey Bay	Icardo Center (Bakersfield, CA)
2010	Cal State San Bernardino	58–52	Cal Poly Pomona	Lumberjack Arena (Arcata, CA)
2011	Cal State Dominguez Hills	51–50	Humboldt State	Pioneer Gym (Hayward, CA)
2012	Humboldt State	89–76	Chico State	RIMAC (La Jolla, CA)
2013	Cal Poly Pomona	78–64	Chico State	Citizens Business Bank Arena (Ontario, CA)
2014	Cal State Stanislaus	82–70	Chico State	Citizens Business Bank Arena (Ontario, CA)
2015	Cal Poly Pomona	62–57 ^{OT}	Chico State	Stockton Arena (Stockton, CA)
2016	Humboldt State	80–68	UC San Diego	Stockton Arena (Stockton, CA)
2017	UC San Diego	78–63	San Francisco State	The Sports Center (San Marcos, CA)
2018	UC San Diego	88–66	Cal Poly Pomona	Kellogg Arena (Pomona, CA)
2019	UC San Diego	71–62	Cal Poly Pomona	Pioneer Gym (Hayward, CA)
2020	UC San Diego	76–62	Cal Poly Pomona	RIMAC Arena (La Jolla, CA)
2021	Cancelled due to the COVID-19 pandemic			
2022	Cal State San Marcos	85–71	Cal State San Bernardino	Lumberjack Arena (Arcata, CA)
2023	Cal State San Bernardino	88–81	Cal State San Marcos	Fitzpatrick Arena (Turlock, CA)
2024	Cal State Los Angeles	73–62	Cal State San Bernardino	Coussoulis Arena (San Bernardino, CA)
2025	Cal State Dominguez Hills	74–68	Chico State	The Sports Center (San Marcos, CA)
2026	Cal State East Bay	80–63	Cal Poly Humboldt	Kellogg Arena (Pomona, CA)

== Championship records ==
School	Finals record	Finals appearances	Years
Cal State Bakersfield	5–1	6	1988, 1990, 1991, 1992, 1993
UC San Diego	5–1	6	2008, 2017, 2018, 2019, 2020
UC Riverside	3–4	7	1986, 1989, 1994
Cal State San Bernardino	3–2	5	2009, 2010, 2023
Cal State Dominguez Hills	3–0	3	1987, 2011, 2025
Cal Poly Pomona	2–6	8	2013, 2015
Cal Poly Humboldt	2–2	4	2012, 2016
Cal State San Marcos	1–1	2	2022
Cal State East Bay	1–0	1	2026
Cal State Los Angeles	1–0	1	2024
Cal State Stanislaus	1–0	1	2014
Grand Canyon	1–0	1	1995
Chico State	0–5	5	
Cal Poly–SLO	0–3	3	
San Francisco State	0–1	1	
Cal State Monterey Bay	0–1	1	
Chapman	0–1	1	

- UC Merced has not yet qualified for the CCAA tournament finals.
- Cal State Northridge, Sonoma State, and UC Davis never qualified for the CCAA tournament finals as conference members. Sonoma State will return to CCAA competition in 2027–28.
- Schools highlighted in pink are former members of the CCAA.

== See also ==
- CCAA women's basketball tournament
