= Renee Jimenez =

American basketball coach (born 1981)

Current position
- Title: Head coach
- Team: UC Santa Barbara
- Conference: Big West
- Record: 38–23 (.623)

Biographical details
- Born: December 22, 1981 (age 44)

Playing career
- 2000–2001: Ventura College
- 2001–2004: San Francisco State

Coaching career (HC unless noted)
- 2005–2008: San Diego State (assistant)
- 2008–2013: Cal State Monterey Bay
- 2013–2015: Cal State San Bernardino
- 2015–2024: Cal State San Marcos
- 2024–present: UC Santa Barbara

Administrative career (AD unless noted)
- 2004–2005: Stanford (video coord.)

Head coaching record
- Overall: 308–174 (.639)
- Tournaments: 8–6 (NCAA Division II)

Accomplishments and honors

Championships
- NCAA Division II Regional – Final Four (2024); 4× CCAA regular season (2011, 2020, 2022, 2024); 2× CCAA tournament (2012, 2023)

Awards
- 4× CCAA Coach of the Year (2011, 2020, 2022, 2024)

Renee Yvonne Jimenez (born December 22, 1981) is an American college basketball coach who is currently the head coach of the UC Santa Barbara Gauchos women's basketball team. She previously served as a head coach at the NCAA Division II level with Cal State Monterey Bay, Cal State San Bernardino, and Cal State San Marcos.

== Early life and playing career ==
Jimenez grew up in an athletic family in Ventura, California, and began playing basketball "around the age of eight or nine" in her driveway. She also went to UC Santa Barbara women's basketball games and camps from an early age. Jimenez attended Ventura High School in Ventura, where she played basketball. As a junior in 1999, she was an honorable mention all-Channel League selection. As a senior, Jimenez helped the Cougars win the Santa Barbara Nike Tournament of Champions Large Schools title at the Thunderdome on her 18th birthday and earned second-team all-Channel League honors. She also played on a club team called the Ventura Stars.

Jimenez played one year at Ventura College under head coach Ned Mircetic and won the 2001 California junior college championship before transferring to San Francisco State University (SFSU). She played three seasons for the Gators from 2001 to 2004 and finished her career as the program's all-time leader in three-pointers made (131) and attempted (397). A team captain for two years, Jimenez also set school records for most three-pointers made (62) and attempted (195) in a single season. She earned her bachelor's degree from SFSU in 2004 after studying a major in liberal studies with an emphasis in kinesiology and a minor in athletic coaching.

== Coaching career ==
While still in high school, Jimenez helped teach at local girls' basketball clinics. In a 2021 interview with The Cougar Chronicle, she stated that she decided to pursue a coaching career while she was in college. After graduating from San Francisco State in 2004, Jimenez worked basketball camps at Stanford University, where she soon accepted a coaching intern position with the women's basketball team under head coach Tara VanDerveer and served as their video coordinator among other responsibilities, such as organizing youth clinics and helping with recruiting evaluations. Jimenez then served as an assistant coach at San Diego State under head coach Beth Burns from 2005 to 2008. She helped rebuild the program, going from 4–25 in her first season to 19–13 in her third. "Part of what I loved about San Diego State was taking a team that was almost non-existent in the basketball world and making a name for ourselves," Jimenez later explained.

=== Cal State Monterey Bay ===
I never wanted to inherit anything already successful. I wanted to build something and call it my own and put my own stamp on it.

— Jimenez on her decision to accept the Cal State Monterey Bay coaching job.

On June 12, 2008, Jimenez was named the head women's basketball coach at Cal State Monterey Bay (CSUMB). She became one of the first two full-time head coaches in the athletic program's history alongside men's basketball coach Rob Bishop, who was hired the same day. At age 26, Jimenez also became the youngest women's basketball coach in the California Collegiate Athletic Association (CCAA). She quickly hired Tina Samaniego, a former teammate in high school and junior college, as an assistant coach.

The Otters were considered "the CCAA's chronic underachievers," having gone 3–24 the year before her arrival. Jimenez led the team to an 11–15 record in her first season as a head coach. She earned her first career win on November 15, 2008, a 95–87 double overtime victory over the University of Mary. Jimenez prioritized recruiting locally, employing a starting lineup that included four Ventura College transfers in 2009–10. "I grew up in the area and played in the area, so I know the talent and there is a lot of Division II talent there," said Jimenez. "It is my opportunity to give back to where I am from because I think there are a lot of good players who have been passed by, and I intend to keep those kids to myself." In her second year at the helm in 2009–10, Jimenez led the Otters to a fourth-place conference finish in the regular season. They qualified for the CCAA tournament for the first time in program history and finished the season with a record of 18–9, 14–8 in the CCAA.

Jimenez was named the CCAA Coach of the Year for the 2010–11 season. She guided CSUMB to the No. 1 ranking in the Division II Western region after winning their first 16 games of the season, which did not include a 53–49 preseason exhibition win over Division I UC Santa Barbara. The team captured the first CCAA regular-season title in school history and reached the championship game of the CCAA tournament, where they lost to Cal Poly Pomona. The Otters earned their first-ever invitation to the NCAA Division II tournament, where they beat Dixie State 69–58 in the first round before losing to Grand Canyon 55–35 in the second round. They set program records for overall wins and conference wins in a single season, finishing with a record of 27–4, 20–2 in CCAA play. CSUMB also had the best scoring defense in the nation, allowing just 51.2 points per game on the season, including a CCAA record-setting 21 points allowed in a 51–21 victory over Cal State East Bay on February 3, 2011.

Coming into her fourth season at the helm in 2011–12, the Otters were picked to finish fourth in the preseason polls after having graduated 75 percent of its scoring. Despite the lower expectations, Jimenez led the team to a record of 21–9, finishing second in the CCAA at 15–7. In the CCAA tournament, CSUMB beat Cal State East Bay and Chico State to reach the championship game, where they defeated Cal State Los Angeles 71–69 on a buzzer-beater to win their first CCAA tournament title in program history. They also clinched an automatic bid to the NCAA Division II tournament, where they lost in the first round to Western Washington. In 2012–13, Jimenez guided the Otters to a third-place finish in the CCAA regular-season standings before losing to UC San Diego in the semifinals of the CCAA tournament. They received an invitation to the NCAA Division II tournament, where they beat Chico State 66–64 in the first round before suffering a 71–63 defeat to Western Washington in the second round.

In five seasons at CSUMB, Jimenez led the Otters to a CCAA regular-season title, a CCAA tournament title, three straight NCAA tournament appearances, and an overall record of 97–46, which gave her the best winning percentage as a head coach of any sport in school history. She was credited with taking the program "from infancy to national relevance." Additionally, Jimenez sustained a 100 percent graduation rate among her players.

=== Cal State San Bernardino ===
On May 30, 2013, Jimenez was announced as the head women's basketball coach at Cal State San Bernardino (CSUSB) – the seventh head coach in program history. She replaced Kevin Becker, who resigned after 17 seasons with the program.

After suffering four straight losses to start the 2013–14 season, Jimenez earned her first victory with the Coyotes in their fifth game, a 60–52 win over Metro State on November 30. After a winless December, the team earned its second victory – and first conference victory – on January 10, 2014, against Jimenez's former team, CSUMB. The Coyotes beat the Otters, 47–46, at home in her first game against her former program. The following day, Jimenez earned her 100th career win as a head coach when CSUSB defeated Cal State East Bay, 71–64, after overcoming a 19-point deficit. On February 15, the Coyotes beat the Otters, 67–51, in Jimenez's return to the CSUMB campus. The matchup was the CBS Sports Network Division II Game of the Week and was notably the first national telecast of a CCAA women's basketball game. "It was a nice homecoming, but my team knew how bad we wanted it, and I knew they would come out and play hard," she said. The Coyotes won five of their last six games of the season, finishing their campaign with a record of 9–16, 8–14 in CCAA play. That offseason, Jimenez extended offers to the entire starting lineup at her alma mater, Ventura College, after the team won the state junior college championship.

The Coyotes began the 2014–15 season with six consecutive victories, tying the best start in school history. They opened their campaign in mid November by winning the Disney Tip-Off Classic with victories over the University of Mary and California Baptist. Later that month, CSUSB won the UC San Diego Thanksgiving Classic by beating Azusa Pacific and Academy of Art, thereby going undefeated in nonconference play. On February 14, 2015, Jimenez led the Coyotes to a 62–60 victory over Stanislaus State on a game-winning three-pointer, which clinched their spot in the CCAA tournament. They earned the fifth seed in the conference tournament, where they beat UC San Diego 69–58 in the opening round before suffering a 69–66 overtime loss to top-seeded Cal State Dominguez Hills in the semifinals. The Coyotes finished the season with a record of 19–9, 14–8 in the CCAA, and were the 13th most improved team in Division II.

In two seasons at CSUSB, Jimenez led the Coyotes to a CCAA tournament appearance and an overall record of 28–25.

=== Cal State San Marcos ===
==== 2015–2020: Initial years ====
This is [Cal State] Monterey Bay all over again. Maybe I am just addicted to the challenge of building a program.

— Jimenez comparing the Cal State San Marcos job to her first head coaching position at Cal State Monterey Bay.

On May 22, 2015, Jimenez was announced as the head women's basketball coach at Cal State San Marcos (CSUSM), which was set to transition to Division II that season as a member of the CCAA. She had applied for the same position at Division I UC Santa Barbara and was a finalist in the selection process, which she credited with changing her perspective. "It really made me go back and re-evaluate what I wanted," she explained. "That (San Marcos) is a place I can see myself for 20, 25 years. I was not a disgruntled employee. It’s more about the lifestyle than anything else. That’s going to be a great place for me and my family." Louis Brewster of the Inland Valley Daily Bulletin called her decision "a surprising move" and "a stunning development," especially considering most of the CSUSB players were returning. Additionally, CSUSM did not have a home gym and instead played at a local community college – MiraCosta College.

Jimenez guided the Cougars to their first-ever CCAA win, a 73–61 victory over Sonoma State, in their Homecoming game on December 5, 2015. The team finished its first season in Division II with a record of 7–18, 5–15 in the CCAA. The following year, Jimenez helped the Cougars improve their record to 13–12, 10–10 in CCAA play. CSUSM tied for seventh in the conference standings and would have qualified for the CCAA tournament, though they were ineligible for postseason play as part of their transition from Division II. In 2017–18, the Cougars dropped to 11th in the conference standings with a record of 8–18, 8–14 in the CCAA. On November 9, 2018, Jimenez led CSUSM to its first ever season-opening win – a 64–57 victory over Hawaii Pacific. The following month, the Cougars beat Cal State Los Angeles 89–87 in the first triple-overtime game in program history. CSUSM finished the regular season on a six-game winning streak to earn their first ever CCAA tournament berth. Jimenez helped the Cougars achieve a historic 75–69 victory over Cal State Dominguez Hills in the first round before suffering a 70–63 loss to undefeated UC San Diego in the semifinals. CSUSM finished the 2018–19 season with a record of 18–10, 14–8 in the CCAA.

In her fifth season at the helm in 2019–20, Jimenez was named the CCAA Coach of the Year after achieving several more program firsts with the Cougars. To begin the season, she guided CSUSM to the No. 2 ranking in the Division II Western region after winning their first seven games, including a 69–63 victory over No. 6 UC San Diego on November 21, 2019, which was both their first win over the Tritons and their first win over a ranked opponent as NCAA members. On March 7, 2020, they beat UC San Diego again on Senior day, 75–57, to secure a share of the CCAA regular-season title – the first in school history – as well as the No. 1 seed in the CCAA tournament. CSUSM beat Sonoma State in the opening round and Cal State East Bay in the semifinal, setting a program-record 11-game winning streak, before falling to UC San Diego in the championship game. The Cougars were set to make their debut appearance in the NCAA Division II tournament against Azusa Pacific, even making the trip to Hawaii, though the competition was cancelled due to the COVID-19 pandemic. Jimenez led the team to a record of 25–5, 18–4 in the CCAA, setting a program record for most wins in a season.

==== 2020–2024: Return from COVID and Final Four appearance ====
At this point, my team would play barefoot with the court on fire.

— Jimenez on her team's eagerness to return to the court in November 2021 following an 18-month break due to COVID.

In November 2020, CSUSM was named in an article by NCAA.com as one of five Division II women's basketball teams to watch during the 2020–21 season. However, shortly thereafter, the CCAA cancelled all sports for the 2020–21 school year, the only Division II conference to do so. As a result, Jimenez was not allowed to access her campus office for 15 months and met with her players only via Zoom. Prior to the Cougars' return to play in 2021–22, the team was picked by CCAA coaches as the preseason favorite to win the conference title.

Jimenez earned her second consecutive (and third overall) CCAA Coach of the Year award for the 2021–22 season. On December 2, 2021, Jimenez earned her 200th win as a head coach when she led CSUSM to a 71–65 victory over Cal State Dominguez Hills. A month later, the Cougars set a program record by sinking 13 three-pointers in a 75–54 win over Cal State Los Angeles. The team finished the regular season on a 17-game winning streak to capture their second consecutive CCAA regular-season title. In the CCAA tournament, CSUSM beat Chico State in the semifinals before they were upset by Cal State East Bay in the championship game, ending their program-record winning streak at 18 games. The Cougars were awarded with a bid to the NCAA Division II tournament, where they suffered an 89–86 overtime defeat to Azusa Pacific in the first round. CSUSM finished its season with a record of 22–4, 19–1 in CCAA play, which was the best season in program history by winning percentage. Despite being selected as the preseason favorites to win the conference title again in 2022–23, the Cougars finished second in the CCAA regular-season standings. However, the team won their first CCAA tournament title in program history, cemented by a 74–62 victory over Cal State Dominguez Hills in the championship game, and entered the West regional of the NCAA Division II tournament as the No. 3 seed. CSUSM beat Central Washington and Azusa Pacific to reach the West regional final, where they suffered a 73–51 loss to league rival Cal State Dominguez Hills. Jimenez led the Cougars to a record of 25–6, 18–4 in the CCAA, tying the program record set three years earlier for most wins in a season.

Jimenez guided the program to its best season ever in 2023–24. On January 11, 2024, CSUSM recorded a 75–41 blowout victory over Cal State San Bernardino, achieving its the largest margin of victory in the Division II era. Then, on February 1, the Cougars made a program-record 15 three-pointers in a 74–69 win over Cal Poly Pomona. Jimenez led the Cougars to their third CCAA regular-season title in four seasons, entering the conference tournament as the top seed. They beat Cal State Los Angeles and Chico State en route to their second consecutive CCAA tournament title. In the NCAA Division II tournament, CSUSM won the West regional title with consecutive victories over Point Loma Nazarene, Western Washington, and Montana State Billings. This punched their ticket to the Elite Eight in St. Joseph, Missouri, where they earned an 85–80 overtime victory over top-seeded Gannon, which The San Diego Union-Tribune described as the biggest win in program history. The Cougars advanced to the Final Four, where they suffered a 70–68 loss to Minnesota State. CSUSM finished its season ranked No. 5 in the WBCA Top 25 Coaches Poll after posting a record of 27–7, 18–4 in the CCAA, setting a new program record for most wins in a season.

In eight seasons with CSUSM, Jimenez led the Cougars to three CCAA regular-season titles, two CCAA tournament titles, four straight NCAA tournament berths (including a Final Four run), and an overall record of 145–80. She left as the program's all-time leader in wins and winning percentage.

=== UC Santa Barbara ===
On April 17, 2024, Jimenez was named the head coach at UC Santa Barbara, replacing Bonnie Henrickson.

== Head coaching record ==
Record table
Season	Team	Overall	Conference	Standing	Postseason
Cal State Monterey Bay (California Collegiate Athletic Association) (2008–2013)
2008–09	Cal State Monterey Bay	11–15	6–14	9th	
2009–10	Cal State Monterey Bay	18–9	14–8	4th	
2010–11	Cal State Monterey Bay	27–4	20–2	1st	NCAA Division II Second Round
2011–12	Cal State Monterey Bay	21–9	15–7	2nd	NCAA Division II First Round
2012–13	Cal State Monterey Bay	20–9	15–7	3rd	NCAA Division II Second Round
Cal State Monterey Bay:		97–46 (.678)	70–38 (.648)		
Cal State San Bernardino (California Collegiate Athletic Association) (2013–2015)
2013–14	Cal State San Bernardino	9–16	8–14	10th	
2014–15	Cal State San Bernardino	19–9	14–8	5th	
Cal State San Bernardino:		28–25 (.528)	22–22 (.500)		
Cal State San Marcos (California Collegiate Athletic Association) (2015–2024)
2015–16	Cal State San Marcos	7–18	5–15	T–10th	
2016–17	Cal State San Marcos	13–12	10–10	T–7th	
2017–18	Cal State San Marcos	8–18	8–14	T–10th	
2018–19	Cal State San Marcos	18–10	14–8	4th	
2019–20	Cal State San Marcos	25–5	18–14	T–1st	Postseason not held
2020–21	Cal State San Marcos	–	–		
2021–22	Cal State San Marcos	22–4	19–1	1st	NCAA Division II First Round
2022–23	Cal State San Marcos	25–6	18–4	2nd	NCAA Division II Sweet 16
2023–24	Cal State San Marcos	27–7	18–4	1st	NCAA Division II Final Four
Cal State San Marcos:		145–80 (.644)	110–60 (.647)		
UC Santa Barbara (Big West Conference) (2024–present)
2024–25	UC Santa Barbara	18–13	12–8	T–5th	
2025–26	UC Santa Barbara	20–10	12–8	6th	
UC Santa Barbara:		38–23 (.623)	24–16 (.600)		
Total:		308–174 (.639)			
National champion Postseason invitational champion Conference regular season champion Conference regular season and conference tournament champion Division regular season champion Division regular season and conference tournament champion Conference tournament champion

== Personal life ==
Jimenez has a wife named Chelsea and a daughter named Quinn. The couple later had twins.
