= CSUSB College of Natural Sciences =

College of California State University, San Bernardino

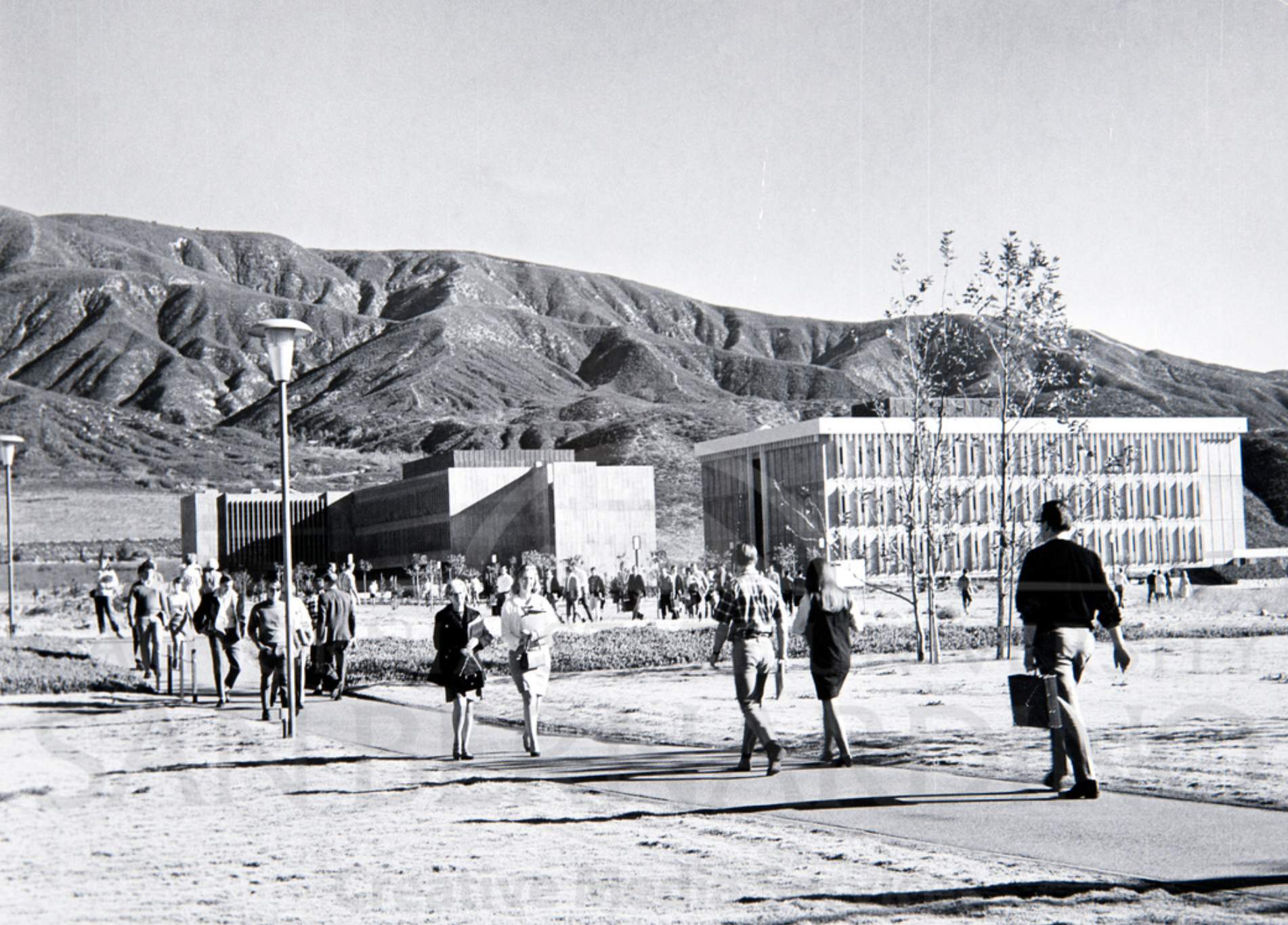
Biology and Physical Sciences buildings in 1965

The California State University, San Bernardino College of Natural Sciences is the San Bernardino region's largest center for science education and research. With nine departments and various specialties, it has many accredited programs, including bachelor's and master's degree programs, and curricula for pre-professional students in medicine, veterinary medicine and dentistry. It provides scientific literacy for all California State University, San Bernardino graduates, and participates in the training of future mathematics and science teachers.

== Academics ==
=== Degrees ===
- BA
- BS
- MA
- MS
- Ed.D
- D.O.

=== Departments/Schools ===
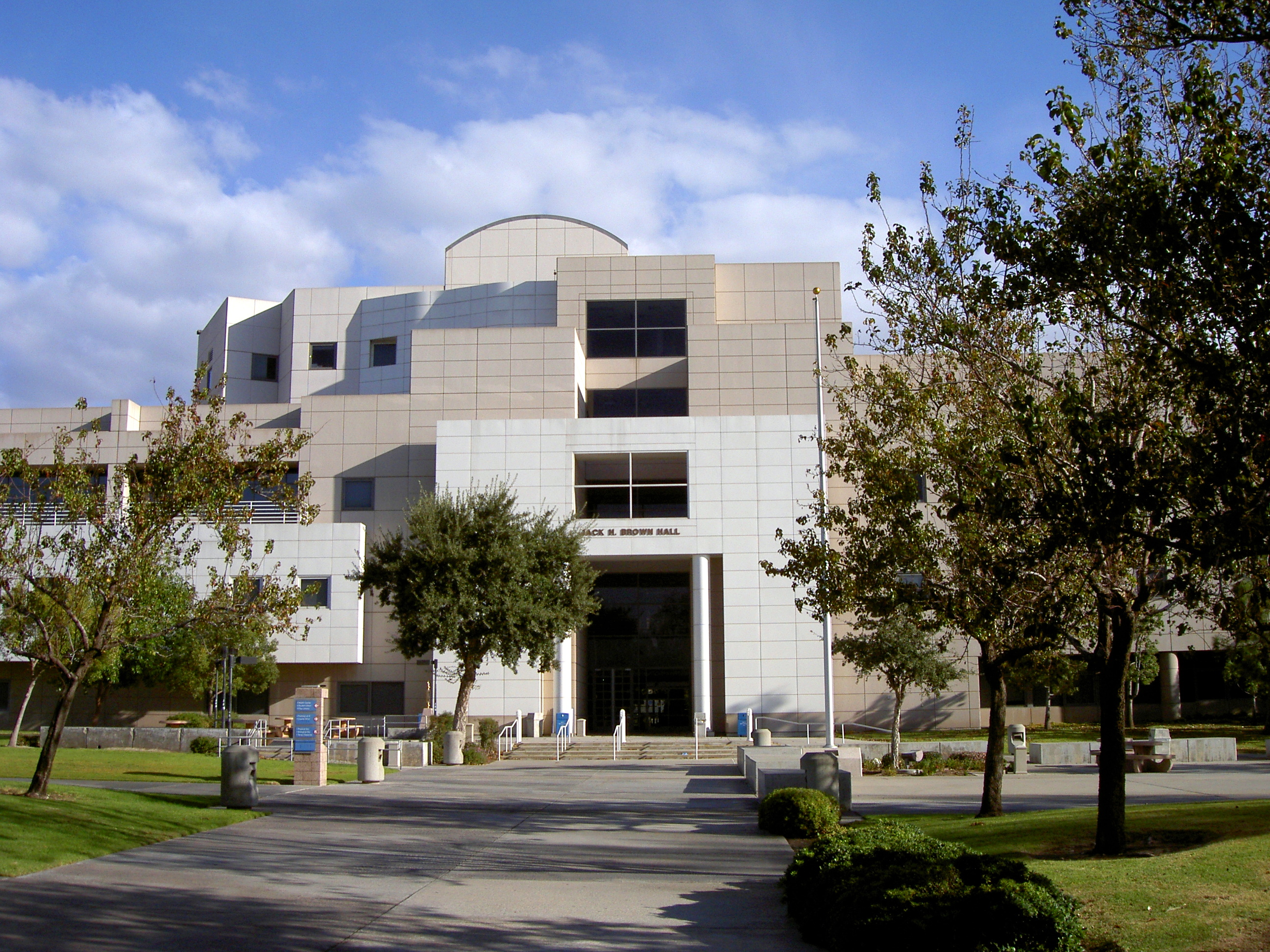
Jack Brown Hall, home of the Department of Mathematics and the School of Computer Science and Engineering.

The college includes several academic departments/schools:

- Biology
- Chemistry & Biochemistry
- School of Computer Science & Engineering
- Geological Sciences
- Health Science and Human Ecology
- Kinesiology
- Mathematics
- Nursing
- Physician Assistant Studies
- Physics and Astronomy
- Pre-Professional Studies (medicine, veterinary medicine, and dentistry)

=== Special Programs ===
- Bioinformatics
- Computational Science
  - Computational Science Research Center (CSRC)
- Doctor of Osteopathic Medicine, D.O. (via Western University)
- Environmental Sciences
- Materials Science
- Mathematics & Science Education
- Pre-Veterinary

==== Institutes/Research Centers ====
- Center for Enhancement of Mathematics Education
- Center for Advanced Functional Materials
- Desert Studies Center
- Murillo Family Observatory
- Southern California Marine Institute
- Water Resources Center

== See also ==
- California State University, San Bernardino
