= CCAA women's basketball tournament =

US collegiate basketball tournament

- Conference basketball championship
- Sport: Basketball
- Conference: California Collegiate Athletic Association
- Number of teams: 8
- Format: Single-elimination tournament
- Current stadium: RIMAC Arena
- Current location: San Diego, CA
- Played: 1986–1995, 2008–present
- Current champion: Cal State Los Angeles (1st)
- Most championships: Cal Poly Pomona (11)
- Official website: CCAA women's basketball

Host stadiums
- Campus Sites (2008–2012, 2017–present); Citizens Business Bank Arena (2013–2014); Stockton Arena (2015–2016)

Host locations
- Campus Sites (2008–2012, 2017–present); Ontario, CA (2013–2014); Stockton, CA (2015–2016)

The California Collegiate Athletic Association women's basketball tournament is the annual conference women's basketball championship tournament for the California Collegiate Athletic Association. The tournament was held annually between 1986 and 1998, discontinued between 1999 and 2007, and then held annually again after it was re-established in 2008. It is a single-elimination tournament and seeding is based on regular season records.

The winner receives the CCAA's automatic bid to the NCAA Women's Division II Basketball Championship.

== Results ==
=== First tournament (1986–1998) ===
Year	Champions	Score	Runner-up
1986	Cal Poly Pomona	69–61	Cal State Northridge
1987	Cal Poly Pomona	80–46	Cal State Northridge
1988	Cal Poly Pomona	71–59	Cal State Los Angeles
1989	Cal Poly Pomona	75–62	Cal State Northridge
1990	Cal Poly Pomona	79–47	Cal State Northridge
1991	Cal Poly Pomona	76–47	Cal State Los Angeles
1992	Cal Poly Pomona	57–45	Cal State Dominguez Hills
1993	Cal Poly Pomona	80–72	Cal State San Bernardino
1994	Cal State San Bernardino	70–57	Cal State Dominguez Hills
1995	Cal State Dominguez Hills	69–66	UC Riverside
1996	UC Riverside	66–58	Cal State Dominguez Hills
1997	Cal Poly Pomona	76–52	Cal State Dominguez Hills
1998	Cal Poly Pomona	70–55	Cal State Dominguez Hills

=== Second tournament (2008–present) ===
Year	Champions	Score	Runner-up	Arena
2008	Chico State	69–63	UC San Diego	Coussoulis Arena (San Bernardino, CA)
2009	Cal State Dominguez Hills	74–69	Humboldt State	Coussoulis Arena (San Bernardino, CA)
2010	Humboldt State	85–55	Chico State	Lumberjack Arena (Arcata, CA)
2011	Cal Poly Pomona	59–53	Cal State Monterey Bay	Pioneer Gymnasium, (Hayward, CA)
2012	Cal State Monterey Bay	71–69	Cal State Los Angeles	RIMAC Arena (La Jolla, San Diego, CA)
2013	UC San Diego	66–61	Cal State Los Angeles	Citizens Business Bank Arena (Ontario, CA)
2014	Cal State Dominguez Hills	65–61	Cal Poly Pomona	Citizens Business Bank Arena (Ontario, CA)
2015	Cal State Dominguez Hills	76–57	Cal State East Bay	Stockton Arena (Stockton, CA)
2016	Cal State East Bay	68–53	Cal State Dominguez Hills	Stockton Arena (Stockton, CA)
2017	Cal State East Bay	62–53	UC San Diego	The Sports Center (San Marcos, CA)
2018	Humboldt State	76–75	UC San Diego	Kellogg Arena (Pomona, CA)
2019	UC San Diego	72–60	Cal Poly Pomona	Pioneer Gymnasium (Hayward, CA)
2020	UC San Diego	73–62	Cal State San Marcos	RIMAC Arena (La Jolla, San Diego, CA)
2021	Cancelled due to the COVID-19 pandemic			
2022	Cal State East Bay	80–66	Cal State San Marcos	Lumberjack Arena (Arcata, CA)
2023	Cal State San Marcos	72–62	Cal State Dominguez Hills	Fitzpatrick Arena (Turlock, CA)
2024	Cal State San Marcos	61–59	Chico State	Coussoulis Arena (San Bernardino, CA)
2025	Cal State Dominguez Hills	77–54	Cal Poly Pomona	The Sports Center (San Marcos, CA)
2026	Cal State Los Angeles	78–62	Cal Poly Pomona	Kellogg Arena (Pomona, CA)

== Championship records ==
School	Finals Record	Finals Appearances	Years
Cal Poly Pomona	11–4	15	1986, 1987, 1988, 1989, 1990, 1991, 1992, 1993, 1997, 1998, 2011
Cal State Dominguez Hills	5–7	12	1995, 2009, 2014, 2015, 2025
UC San Diego	3–3	6	2013, 2019, 2020
Cal State East Bay	3–1	4	2016, 2017, 2022
Cal State San Marcos	2–2	4	2023, 2024
Humboldt State	2–1	3	2010, 2018
Cal State Los Angeles	1–4	5	2026
Chico State	1–2	3	2008
Cal State Monterey Bay	1–1	2	2012
UC Riverside	1–1	2	1996
Cal State San Bernardino	1–1	2	1994
Cal State Northridge	0–4	4	

- Cal State Stanislaus, UC Merced, and San Francisco State have not yet qualified for the CCAA tournament finals.
- Cal Poly San Luis Obispo, Cal State Bakersfield, Chapman, Grand Canyon, and Sonoma State never qualified for the CCAA tournament finals as conference members.
- Schools highlighted in pink are former members of the CCAA.

== See also ==
- CCAA men's basketball tournament
