= CSUSB College of Arts and Letters =

College of California State University, San Bernardino

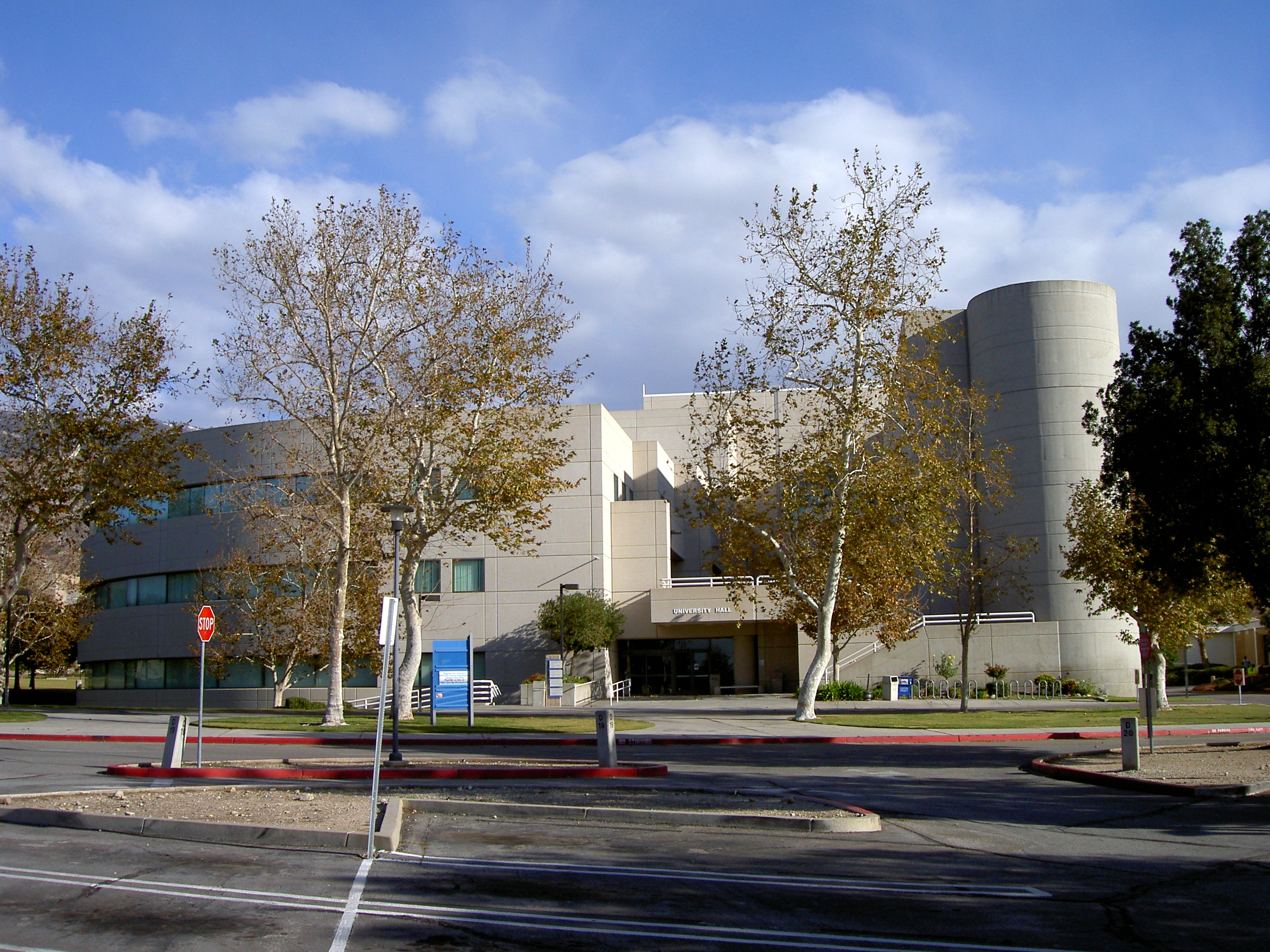
University Hall, home to the College of Arts and Letters

The California State University - San Bernardino College of Arts & Letters provides liberal arts education at CSUSB. The college contains nineteen academic departments and a number of interdisciplinary programs, each of which is designed to help students understand their role in society and to develop aesthetic sensibilities. With 300 permanent faculty and many associated lecturers, this is the largest of the seven colleges, and is responsible for over one-third of the instruction at CSUSB. Because the college occupies an important role in general education, virtually all CSUSB students take courses here.

== Academics ==
=== Departments ===
The College of Arts & Letters includes several academic departments:

- Art
- Communication Studies
- English
- Liberal Studies
- Music
- Philosophy
- Theatre Arts
- World Languages & Literatures

=== Special programs ===
- Asian Studies
- African American Studies
- Institute for International Security and Conflict Resolution (ISCOR)
- Latin American Studies

==== Institutes, research centers and facilities ====
- Visual Resource Center
- Robert and Frances Fullerton Museum of Art

==== Publications and media ====
- Coyote Chronicle
- Coyote Radio

== See also ==
- California State University, San Bernardino
