= UC San Diego Tritons men's basketball =

UC San Diego's men's basketball team

2026–27 UC San Diego Tritons men's basketball team
- University: University of California, San Diego
- First season: 1965; 61 years ago
- Head coach: Clint Allard (2nd season)
- Location: La Jolla, California
- Arena: LionTree Arena (capacity: 4,200)
- Conference: Big West Conference (WCC in 2027–28)
- Nickname: Tritons
- Colors: Blue and gold
- All-time record: 712–683 (.510)

NCAA Division I tournament Sweet Sixteen
- Division III: 1991; Division II: 2016, 2017

NCAA Division I tournament appearances
- Division III: 1990, 1991, 1992, 1994; Division II: 2008, 2016, 2017, 2018, 2019; Division I: 2025

Conference tournament champions
- CCAA; 2008, 2017, 2018, 2019, 2020; Big West: 2025

Conference regular-season champions
- CCAA: 2017, 2019, 2020; Big West: 2025

Uniforms
Home	Away

The UC San Diego Tritons men's basketball team is the men's college basketball program that represents the University of California, San Diego. The Tritons compete in NCAA Division I as a member of the Big West Conference (BWC). The team plays its home games at LionTree Arena. They made their first appearance in the NCAA Division I men's basketball tournament in 2025, their first eligible year after transitioning from NCAA Division II.

== History ==
At the end of the 2007–08 season, they won the CCAA tournament and advanced to the first round of the NCAA West Regionals. After a relatively dry spell, the team has seen most of its success in recent years under Eric Olen. In 2015–16, they were the NCAA West Region runners-up. The 2016–17 season was the first in which they won the CCAA regular-season title; they also won the CCAA Tournament and were again NCAA West Region runners-up. The team won the CCAA Tournament again in 2017–18, but dropped in the NCAA West Regional quarterfinals. The Tritons have the most CCAA Tournament titles of any current or former CCAA member school, with five.

Triton basketball transitioned to NCAA Division I and the Big West Conference in 2020. They became eligible to participate in March Madness in 2025 following a four-year transition period. In that year, UC San Diego won the Big West Conference tournament to earn an automatic bid to the NCAA tournament for the first time in program history.

== Postseason results ==
=== NCAA Division I tournament results ===
The Tritons appeared in the NCAA Division I men's basketball tournament one time. They have a record of 0–1.

Year	Seed	Round	Opponent	Result
2025	#12	First Round	#5 Michigan	L 65–68

=== NCAA Division II tournament results ===
The Tritons appeared in the NCAA Division II men's basketball tournament five times. They have a record of 5–5.

Year	Round	Opponent	Result
2008	First Round	Alaska Anchorage	L 60–80
2016	First Round; Second Round; Sweet Sixteen	Chico State; Cal Baptist; Western Oregon	W 76–64; W 71–69; L 55–60
2017	First Round	Dixie State; California Baptist; Chico State	W 94–68; W 84–80; L 86–94
2018	First Round	California Baptist	L 67–81
2019	First Round; Second Round	Cal Poly Pomona; Point Loma Nazarene	W 61–50; L 50–73
2020	First Round	Western Washington	Cancelled

=== NCAA Division III tournament results ===
UC San Diego appeared in the NCAA Division III men's basketball tournament four times. They had a record of 2–4.

Year	Round	Opponent	Result
1990	Second Round	Nebraska Wesleyan	L 75–77
1991	Second Round; Sectional Semifinal	Claremont-Mudd-Scripps; Otterbein	W 76–72; L 95–108
1992	Second Round	Cal Lutheran	L 70–88
1994	First Round; Second Round	Pomona-Pitzer; Cal Lutheran	W 67–66; L 81–95

=== CBI results ===
The Tritons have appeared in the College Basketball Invitational (CBI) once in 2024. Their combined record is 0–1.

Year	Round	Opponent	Result
2024	First Round	Chicago State	L 75–77

== Yearly records ==
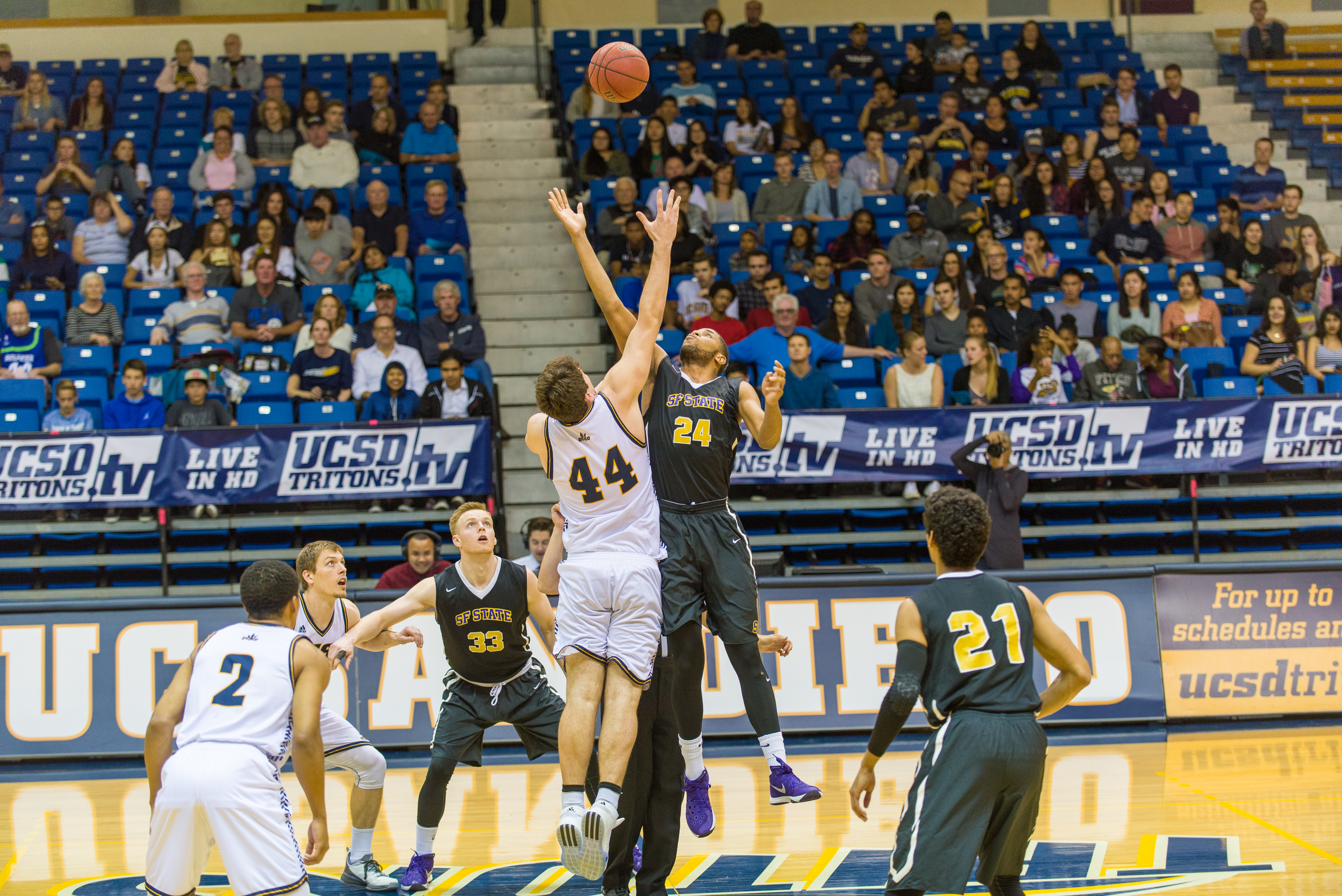
The Tritons tip off a 2016 home game against SFSU

Record table
Season	Coach	Overall	Conference	Standing	Postseason
Pre-Division II (1965–2000)
1965–66	Jack Shawcroft	1–1 (.500)			
1966–67	Neale Stoner	9–10			
1967–68	Neale Stoner	10–14			
1968–69	Neale Stoner	19–8			
Neale Stoner:		38–32 (.543)			
1969–70	Barry Cunningham	13–14			
1970–71	Barry Cunningham	14–12			
1971–72	Barry Cunningham	13–13			
Barry Cunningham (1969–72):		40–39 (.506)			
1972–73	Bill Reeves	13–13			
1973–74	Bill Reeves	14–12			
Bill Reeves:		27–25 (.519)			
1974–75	Barry Cunningham	13–13			
1975–76	Barry Cunningham	11–15			
Barry Cunningham (1974–76):		24–28 (.462)			
1976–77	Dick Satterlee	4–24 (.143)			
1977–78	Barry Cunningham	8–19			
1978–79	Barry Cunningham	9–21			
Barry Cunningham (1977–79):		17–40 (.298)			
Barry Cunningham (overall):		81–107 (.431)			
1979–80	Ron Carter	17–13 (.567)			
1980–81	John Block	9–17			
1981–82	John Block	10–16			
1982–83	John Block	13–13			
John Block:		32–46 (.410)			
1983–84	Tom Marshall	11–17			
1984–85	Tom Marshall	13–13			
1985–86	Tom Marshall	14–12			
1986–87	Tom Marshall	18–8			
1987–88	Tom Marshall	17–9			
1988–89	Tom Marshall	9–17			
1989–90	Tom Marshall	20–7			NCAA DIII West Region 2nd round
1990–91	Tom Marshall	23–4			NCAA DIII Sectional Semifinal
1991–92	Tom Marshall	22–5			NCAA DIII West Region 2nd round
1992–93	Tom Marshall	17–8			
1993–94	Tom Marshall	21–5			NCAA DIII West Region 2nd round
Tom Marshall:		185–105 (.638)			
1994–95	Greg Lanthier	12–13			
1995–96	Greg Lanthier	11–14			
1996–97	Greg Lanthier	17–8			
1997–98	Greg Lanthier	18–7			
1998–99	Greg Lanthier	20–5			
1999–2000	Greg Lanthier	5–20			
Greg Lanthier (Div. III):		83–67 (.553)			
Pre-Division II Era:		185–105 (.638)			
Division II Era (California Collegiate Athletic Association) (2000–2020)
2000–01	Greg Lanthier	4–23	3–19	12th	
2001–02	Greg Lanthier	8–21	5–17	11th	
2002–03	Greg Lanthier	7–21	6–16	10th	
2003–04	Greg Lanthier	9–18	9–13	7th	
Greg Lanthier (Div. II):		28–83 (.252)	23–65 (.261)		
Greg Lanthier:		111–149 (.427)	23–65 (.261)		
2004–05	Bill Carr	11–16	7–13	8th	
2005–06	Bill Carr	15–14	12–8	T-4th	
2006–07	Bill Carr	11–16	7–13	8th	
Bill Carr:		38–45 (.458)	29–33 (.468)		
2007–08	Chris Carlson	18–12	11–9	T-3rd	NCAA DII West Region Quarterfinals
2008–09	Chris Carlson	17–11	13–7	T-5th	CCAA tournament semifinals
2009–10	Chris Carlson	8–17	7–15	9th	
2010–11	Chris Carlson	11–17	6–16	11th	
2011–12	Chris Carlson	10–17	6–16	11th	
2012–13	Chris Carlson	11–15	10–12	7th	CCAA Tournament quarterfinals
Chris Carlson:		75–89 (.457)	53–75 (.414)		
2013–14	Eric Olen	15–11	11–11	7th	
2014–15	Eric Olen	16–11	14–8	T-4th	CCAA Tournament quarterfinals
2015–16	Eric Olen	24–8	15–5	2nd	NCAA DII West Region Final
2016–17	Eric Olen	27–6	17–3	1st	NCAA DII West Region Final
2017–18	Eric Olen	21–11	15–7	T-3rd	NCAA DII West Region quarterfinal
2018–19	Eric Olen	26–8	17–5	T-1st	NCAA DII West Region semifinal
2019–20	Eric Olen	30–1	21–1	1st	NCAA DII West Region Tournament (Cancelled due to COVID-19)
Division II Era:		300–273 (.524)	215–213 (.502)		
Division I Era (Big West Conference) (2020–Present)
2020–21	Eric Olen	7–10	-–	No Placement	
2021–22	Eric Olen	13–16	-–	11th*	
2022–23	Eric Olen	10–20	5–13	9th	
2023–24	Eric Olen	21–12	15–5	2nd	CBI First Round
2024–25	Eric Olen	30–5	18–2	1st	NCAA Division I Round of 64
Eric Olen:		210–114 (.648)	130–58 (.691)		
Total:		849–751 (.531)			
National champion Postseason invitational champion Conference regular season champion Conference regular season and conference tournament champion Division regular season champion Division regular season and conference tournament champion Conference tournament champion

- Games against Big West opponents during the 2020-21 and 2021-22 season are considered non-conference games by the Big West Conference due to DI Reclassification.
- UC San Diego was not eligible for conference or NCAA postseason events until the 2024-25 season due to DI reclassification restrictions.
