= UC Riverside Highlanders women's basketball =

College women's basketball team at the University of California, Riverside

UC Riverside Highlanders
2025–26 UC Riverside Highlanders women's basketball team
- University: University of California, Riverside
- Head coach: Brad Langston (3rd season)
- Conference: Big West
- Location: Riverside, California
- Arena: Student Recreation Center Arena (capacity: 3,168)
- Nickname: Highlanders
- Colors: Blue and gold

NCAA tournament appearances
- 1993*, 1994*, 1995*, 2006, 2007, 2010

AIAW tournament appearances
- 1973

Conference tournament champions
- CCAA: 1996; Big West: 2006, 2007, 2010

Conference regular-season champions
- 2007, 2016
- * Division II

The UC Riverside Highlanders women's basketball team represents the University of California, Riverside in Riverside, California, United States. The school's team currently competes in the Big West Conference. They play their home games at the Student Recreation Center Arena.

== History ==
The Highlanders have appeared in the NCAA Tournament three times since joining Division I, making it in 2006, 2007, and 2010 after winning the Big West title. They have also made the WNIT in 2009, 2011, and 2016.

== Year by Year Records ==
Season	Record	Conference record	Coach
2018–19	0–0	0–0	John Margaritis

== Postseason results ==
=== NCAA Division I ===
The Highlanders have made three appearances in the NCAA Division I women's basketball tournament. They have a combined record of 0–3.

Year	Seed	Round	Opponent	Result
2006	#16	First Round	#1 North Carolina	L 51−75
2007	#14	First Round	#3 Arizona State	L 50−57
2010	#16	First Round	#1 Stanford	L 47−79

=== NCAA Division II ===
The Highlanders made three appearances in the NCAA Division II women's basketball tournament. They had a combined record of 0–3.

Year	Round	Opponent	Result
1993	First Round	Cal Poly Pomona	L 49–62
1994	First Round	Cal State Dominguez Hills	L 53–57
1995	First Round	Chico State	L 59–68

=== AIAW Division I ===
The Highlanders made one appearance in the AIAW National Division I basketball tournament, with a combined record of 1–2.

Year	Round	Opponent	Result
1973	First Round; Consolation First Round; Consolation Second Round	Queens (NC); Utah State; South Carolina	L, 36–62; W 47–41; L 36–49
