= CSUSB Jack H. Brown College of Business and Public Administration =

College of California State University, San Bernardino

Coordinates: 34.1815°N 117.3232°W

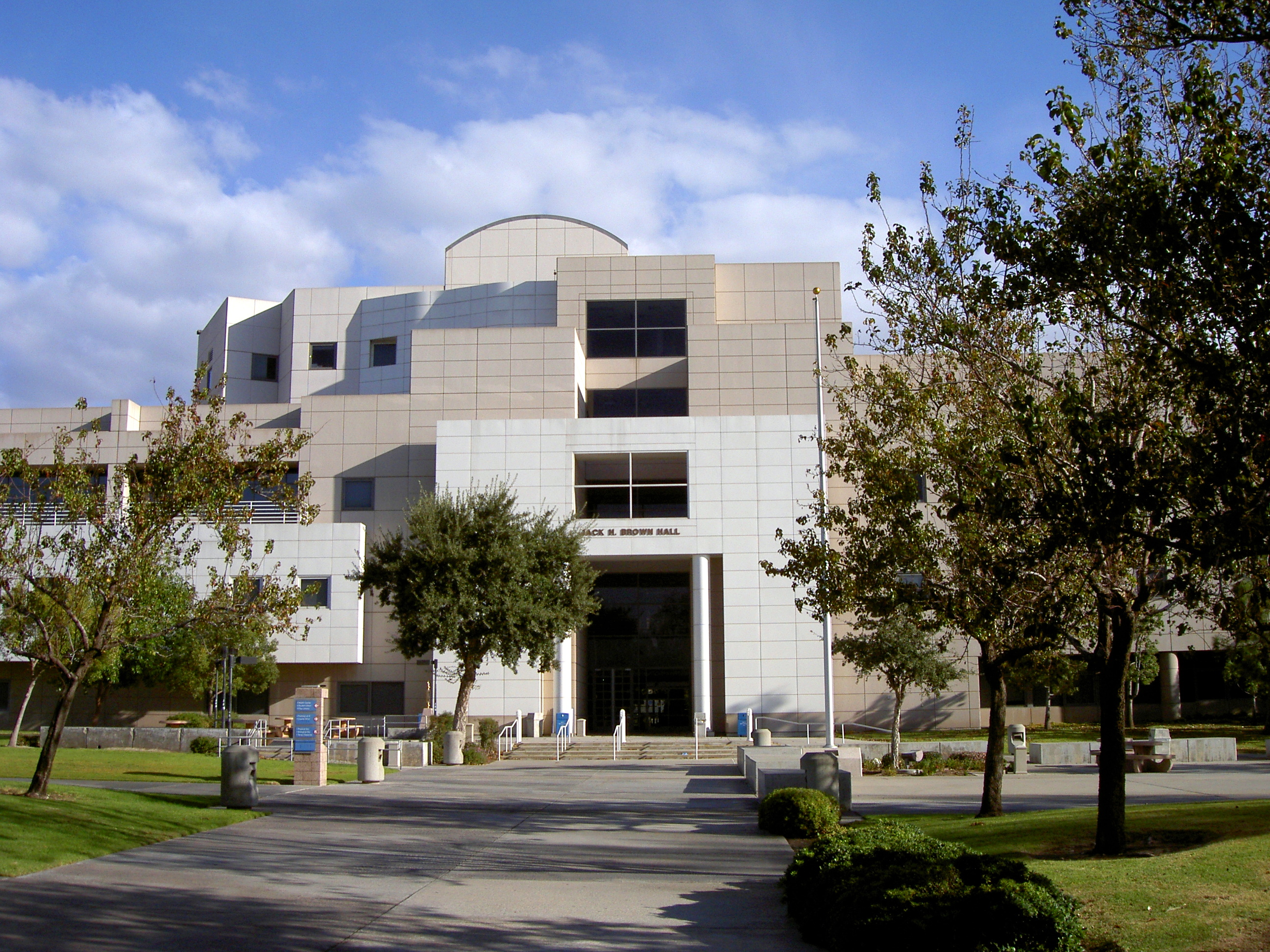
Jack Brown Hall, home of the College of Business and Public Administration

The California State University, San Bernardino's Jack H. Brown College of Business and Public Administration is a California State University, San Bernardino business school in San Bernardino, California, United States. Comprising seven departments/schools and various specialties, the College offers bachelor's and master's. The College states that its mission is to prepare graduates with foundational knowledge in their fields and professional skills relevant to local and regional industries. The College has many accredited programs.

Many CSUSB programs have earned specialized national and international accreditation, including the business program, which was the first in the Inland Empire to gain Association to Advance Collegiate Schools of Business (AACSB) Accreditation at both the graduate and undergraduate levels. AACSB describes its accreditation as the highest standard of achievement for business schools worldwide. Less than 5% of the world's 13,000 business programs have earned AACSB Accreditation. AACSB claims that its accredited schools produce graduates who are more desirable to employers than those from non-accredited schools. The business and entrepreneurship programs are nationally recognized, as evidenced by CSUSB's 2006 ranking of fourth in the United States for graduate entrepreneur programs and the AACSB's Entrepreneurship Spotlight determined the School of Entrepreneurship and the Inland Empire Center for Entrepreneurship among the Top 35 Globally ranked programs for fostering entrepreneurship. The university's College of Business and Public Administration was also listed in the 2008 edition and the 2013 edition of The Princeton Review's "Best 290 Business Schools.". In 2011, California State University, San Bernardino’s College of Business and Public Administration was recognized by European CEO Magazine as one of the top 22 schools of business in the world, In addition, CSUSB's advanced accounting students provide free tax preparation services to local low-income, elderly, disabled, non-English-speaking residents.

== Academics ==
=== Departments ===
The Jack H. Brown College of Business and Public Administration at CSUSB includes:

- Accounting & Finance
- Information & Decision Sciences
- Management
- Marketing
- Public Administration
- School of Entrepreneurship
