= UC Santa Barbara Gauchos women's basketball =

UC Santa Barbara Gauchos
2026–27 UC Santa Barbara Gauchos women's basketball team
- University: University of California, Santa Barbara
- Head coach: Renee Jimenez (3rd season)
- Location: Santa Barbara, California
- Arena: UC Santa Barbara Events Center (capacity: 5,600)
- Conference: Big West Conference (WCC in 2027–28)
- Nickname: Gauchos
- Colors: Blue and gold

NCAA Division I tournament Sweet Sixteen
- 2004

NCAA Division I tournament appearances
- 1992, 1993, 1997, 1998, 1999, 2000, 2001, 2002, 2003, 2004, 2005, 2008, 2009, 2012

Conference tournament champions
- 1992, 1993, 1997, 1998, 1999, 2000, 2001, 2002, 2003, 2004, 2005, 2008, 2009, 2012

Conference regular-season champions
- 1992, 1996, 2001, 2002, 2003, 2004, 2005, 2006, 2008, 2009, 2011

The UC Santa Barbara Gauchos women's basketball team is the basketball team that represents University of California, Santa Barbara in Santa Barbara, California, United States. The school's team currently competes in the Big West Conference.

== History ==
As of the end of the 2015–16 season, the Gauchos have an all-time record of 699–581. They previously played in the SCWIAC from 1972–1976, the SCAA from 1976–1981, Independent status from 1981–1983, and the PCAA from 1983–1987 before it rebranded as the Big West Conference in 1987. UCSB has the most Big West Conference tournament titles with 14, with 11 regular season titles in addition. advanced to the Sweet Sixteen in 2004 after beating Colorado 76–49 and Houston 56–52. They lost 63–57 to Connecticut to end their run.

== Year by Year Records ==
Season	Record	Conference record	Coach
2018–19	0–0	0–0	Bonnie Henrickson

== NCAA tournament results ==
UC Santa Barbara has appeared in the NCAA Division I women's basketball tournament fourteen times. They have a record of 7–14.

Year	Seed	Round	Opponent	Result
1992	#9	First Round; Second Round	#8 Houston #1 Stanford	W 80−69; L 73–82
1993	#5	First Round; Second Round	#12 BYU #4 Colorado	W 88−79; L 54–81
1997	#13	First Round	#4 Tulane	L 69–72
1998	#11	First Round; Second Round	#6 Vanderbilt #3 Illinois	W 76−71; L 65–69
1999	#10	First Round	#7 SW Missouri State	L 70–72
2000	#4	First Round	#13 Rice	L 64–67
2001	#14	First Round	#3 Purdue	L 62–75
2002	#12	First Round; Second Round	#5 Louisiana Tech #4 Texas	W 57−56; L 60–76
2003	#7	First Round; Second Round	#10 Xavier #2 Texas Tech	W 71−62; L 48–71
2004	#11	First Round; Second Round; Sweet Sixteen	#6 Colorado #3 Houston #2 Connecticut	W 76−49; W 56–52; L 57–63
2005	#13	First Round	#4 Notre Dame	L 51–61
2008	#13	First Round	#4 Virginia	L 52–86
2009	#15	First Round	#2 Stanford	L 39–74
2012	#16	First Round	#1 Baylor	L 40–81
