= Alexander Sokoloff =

American geneticist

Alexander Sokoloff (May 16, 1920 – March 23, 2011) was a biologist and geneticist who conducted genetic research on the red flour beetle Tribolium castaneum, a world-wide pest species. From 1965 to 1990 he was a Professor of Biology at California State University, San Bernardino, serving for part of that time as Department Chair.

== Early life and education ==
Born in Japan, Sokoloff grew up in Mexico City, where his family moved after the Tokyo earthquake. In high school, Sokoloff's early interests in biology and genetics lead him to work as a field assistant for the evolutionary population geneticist Theodosius Dobzhansky.

At the age of 15, Sokoloff emigrated to the U.S. to study biology. He earned his B.S. degree in Zoology at the University of California, Los Angeles and his Ph.D degree at the University of Chicago in the laboratory of Thomas Park. During his graduate work in the late 1950s, Sokoloff studied the genetics of Tribolium, discovering and describing hundreds of genetic mutants,

== Career ==
During the second world war, Sokoloff served in the Army Air Force. After the war, he engaged in research in genetics and evolution at Hofstra University, Northern New York Agriculture Research Institute, the Botanical Association at University of California Los Angeles, and the University of California Berkeley.

In 1965, Sokoloff became Professor of Biology at the newly constructed California State College, San Bernardino, where he served as Chair in the Department of biology. mentoring students in genetic research, and teaching genetics, entomology and evolution until his retirement in 1990.

Many of the genetic mutants discovered by Sokoloff are still in use and are housed in the world Tribolium Stock Center at the USDA-ARS Center for Grain and Animal Health Research in Manhattan, Kansas. This work led to further arthropod genomics research by other biologists, culminating in the publication of complete genome sequence of Tribolium castaneum in 2008

== Publications ==
Between 1959 and 2002, Sokoloff published over 200 research papers. He also wrote a three volume scientific textbook series on Tribolium, entitled The genetic of tribolium and related species (1966), The biology of Tribolium Vol. ll (1974) and The biology of Tribolium Vol. lll (1977), which continues to serve as the authoritative source for information on Tribolium genetics and biology.

He further functioned as publisher and editor of the Tribolium Information Bulletin. In 2006, Sokoloff self-published his memoir 'Letters from my mentors: Professor Theodosius Dobzhansky and the Reverend E. L. Yeats', which includes his letter correspondence with Theodosius Dobzhansky.
