= John M. Pfau Library =

Library

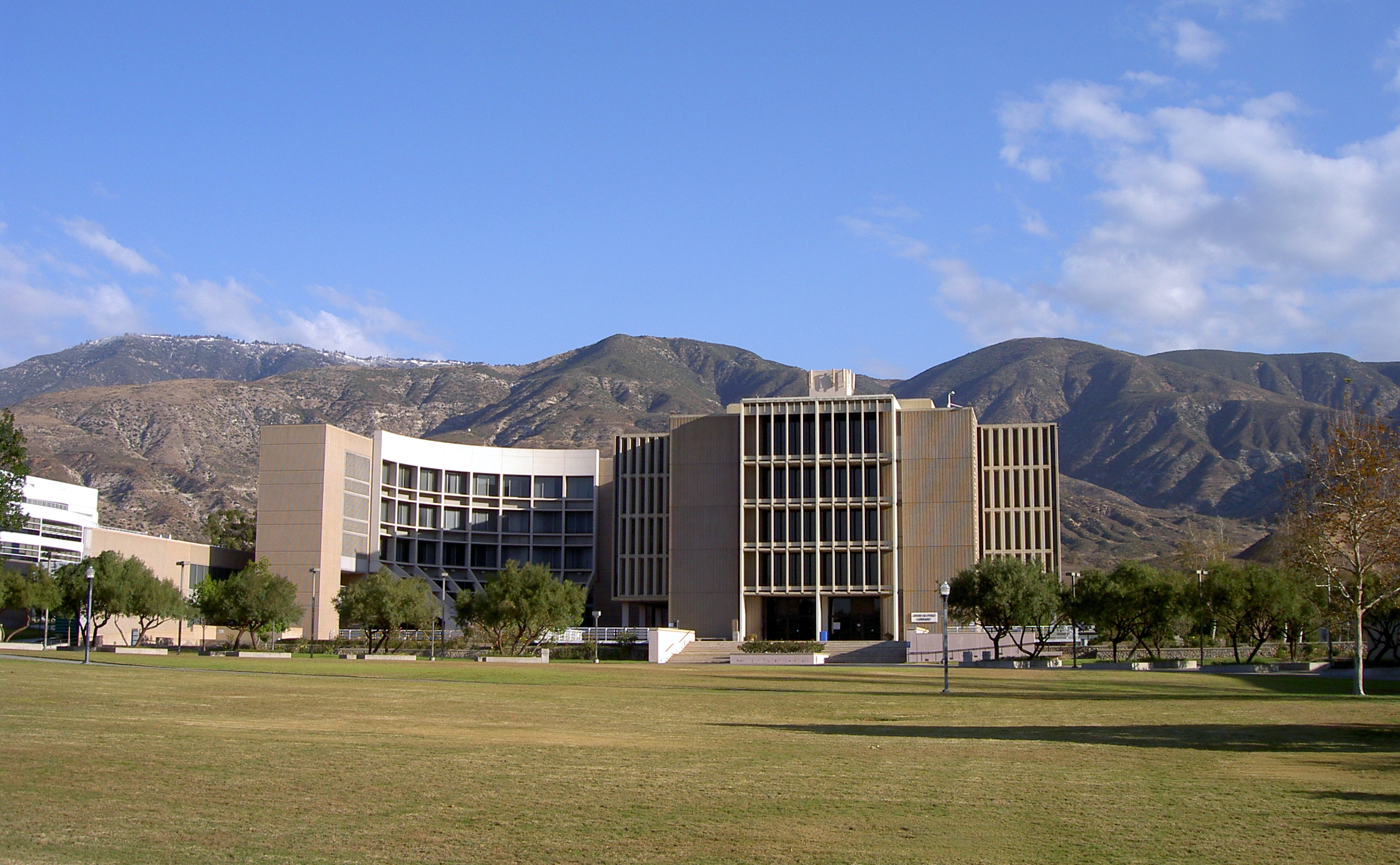
- John M. Pfau Library
- Location: University District, San Bernardino, California, United States
- Type: Academic library
- Scope: Research
- Established: 1965
- Architects: William Francis Cody, Criley & McDowell
- Branches: 1 (Helene A. Hixon Information Center, Palm Desert Campus)

Collection
- Size: 750,000 books; 21,000 electronic journals

Access and use
- Members: CSU San Bernardino faculty, staff, and students as well as community members

Other information
- Director: Cesar Caballero
- Website: http://www.lib.csusb.edu/

The John M. Pfau Library is the library on the campus of California State University, San Bernardino in San Bernardino, California, United States. It is named after the founding president of the university, Dr. John Martin Pfau. It has two sections totaling 294,000 square feet.

The first library director, Arthur E. Nelson, was appointed by Dr. Pfau in 1963. Nelson began accumulating materials in a local warehouse and by 1965 had 50,000 books to move into Sierra Hall, one of the first (multipurpose) buildings on the campus. In 1968, construction began on the current library building which was occupied in 1971. Later on, a new wing was added which was completed in 1994.
