= CSUSB College of Extended Learning =

College of CSUSB

California State University, San Bernardino College of Extended and Global Education
- Established: 2019; 7 years ago
- Location: San Bernardino, California, United States; 34.1832°N 117.3231°W
- Website: www.csusb.edu/cege

The California State University, San Bernardino College of Extended and Global Education is one of the several colleges of the California State University, San Bernardino, located on the third floor of the Center for Global Innovation building on the main university campus in the University District of San Bernardino, California.

== Programs ==
The College of Extended and Global Education provides continuing education and international extension programs, including degree and certificate programs, an English Language program, customized training, and other professional development opportunities. The College also has an Open University program, which allows prospective students to take courses from the University's offerings on a space-available basis without going through the formal admission process. Lastly, the College is home to the Center for International Studies and Programs at California State University, San Bernardino.
