= California State University, San Bernardino =

Public university in San Bernardino, California

- Motto: "We define the future"
- Type: Public research university
- Established: 1965; 61 years ago
- Parent institution: California State University
- Accreditation: WSCUC
- Academic affiliations: CUMU; Space-grant
- Endowment: $57.6 million (2023-24)
- Budget: $335.8 million (2024-25)
- President: S. Terri Gomez
- Faculty: 505 full-time (2019)
- Students: 17,900 (Fall 2024)
- Undergraduates: 14,993 (Fall 2024)
- Postgraduates: 2,907 (Fall 2024)
- Location: San Bernardino, California, United States
- Campus: 441 acres (178 ha); Large city
- Other campuses: Palm Desert
- Newspaper: Coyote Chronicle
- Colors: Coyote blue and black
- Nickname: Coyotes
- Sporting affiliations: NCAA Division II – CCAA
- Mascot: Cody the Coyote
- Website: csusb.edu

California State University, San Bernardino (Cal State San Bernardino or CSUSB) is a public research university in San Bernardino, California, United States. Founded in 1965, it is part of the California State University system. The main campus sits on 441 acres (178 ha) in the University District of San Bernardino, with a branch campus of 169 acres (68 ha) in Palm Desert, California, opened in 1986. Cal State San Bernardino's fall 2025 enrollment was 19,049. In fall 2025, it had 1,084 faculty, of which 436 were on the tenure track. Total staff (excluding student employees) were 952.

The university offers 232 degrees; a full list of all available bachelor's, master's, doctoral, and certificates can be found online at the above links.

CSUSB's sports teams are known as the Coyotes and play in the California Collegiate Athletic Association in the Division II of the National Collegiate Athletic Association. The nickname was inspired by the coyotes that inhabit the area around the campus, which lies in the foothills of the San Bernardino Mountains. Men's sports include Baseball, Basketball, Golf, and Soccer. Women's sports include Basketball, Cross Country, Soccer, Softball, Volleyball, and Track and Field.

The university is a Hispanic-serving institution and a Minority-serving institution.

== History ==
California State University, San Bernardino was created by the state legislature on April 29, 1960, as the San Bernardino-Riverside State College. On February 8, 1963, the California State College system's board of trustees chose a 430-acre (170 ha) site in the city of San Bernardino and the college's official name was changed to California State College at San Bernardino. It opened in 1965, with 293 students and 30 faculty members. CSUSB earned its university status in 1984, officially becoming California State University, San Bernardino. Today, the university has more than 19,000 students and over 130,000 alumni. It includes two campuses, one in San Bernardino County and one in the Coachella Valley (the Palm Desert Campus), each of which is a four-year campus offering undergraduate and graduate degrees.

The campus' five presidents from its founding are: Dr. John M. Pfau, Dr. Anthony "Tony" Evans, Dr. Albert "Al" K. Karnig, Dr. Tomás D. Morales, and Dr. S. Terri Gomez.

== Campus ==
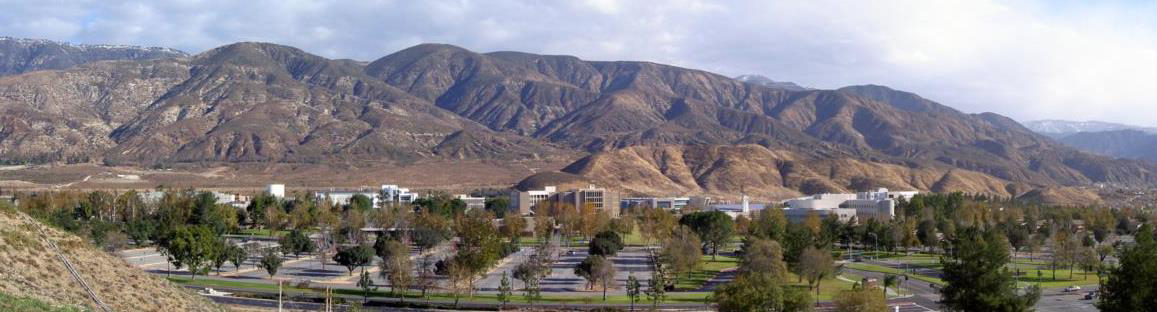
Panoramic view of the CSUSB campus against the San Bernardino Mountains (2009)

Built atop 441 acres (178 ha) of bedrock on the city's north side, CSUSB is framed to the north by the San Bernardino Mountains. Under President Al Karnig, more than 1,300,000 square feet (120,000 m^{2}) of new facilities were built to meet students' academic and social needs. Under President Tomás D. Morales, an additional 552,612 gross square feet, total, were added to both the San Bernardino and the Palm Desert campuses.

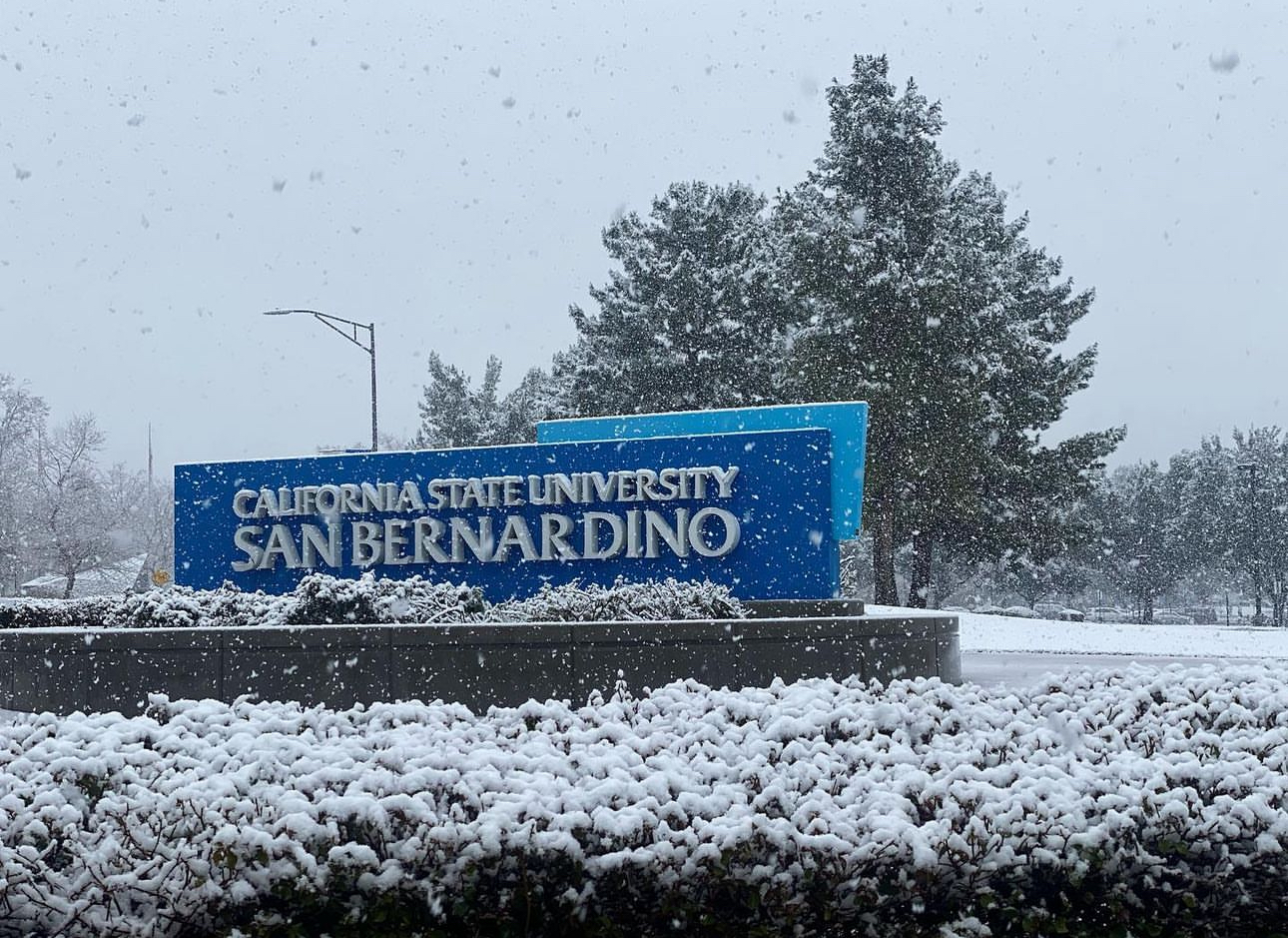
Entrance along University Parkway

Since 2013, the new buildings or additions include: The Center for Global Innovation; the Performing Arts Center (opened in 2026); the Student Union Expansion also known as SMSU North; Coyote Walk; at the Pfau Library, the Faculty Center for Excellence, the Staff Development Center, the Cave 24/7 Study Space, and Starbucks; Coyote Commons; Coyote Village’s Cajon Hall and Running Springs; Einsteins Bagels at the College of Social and Behavioral Sciences; the Alumni Center as well as the renovation of the old Commons into a home for CSUSB’s Alumni Office; the electrical substation and other related campus infrastructure—projects that literally help to keep the lights on; electric vehicle charging stations and charging ports at the Palm Desert Campus; and the PDC’s forthcoming Student Success Center, the first state-funded project on that campus.

The John M. Pfau Library, named after the university's first president, sits at the very center of the campus. Other distinctive university landmarks include: the clock tower above the Santos Manuel Student Union, the Robert V. Fullerton Art Museum, the James & Aerianthi Coussoulis Arena, Legacy Fountain, and the Wild Song statue that students rub for luck before exams.

In 2009, the university received a major donation from the Pauline Murillo family to construct a $2 million research observatory on the campus. The W.M. Keck Foundation and the California Portland Cement Co. also made substantial contributions.

The university is a Hispanic-serving institution and a Minority-serving institution.

=== Robert and Frances Fullerton Museum of Art ===
The Robert and Frances Fullerton Museum of Art (formerly the Robert V. Fullerton Art Museum) is among the 4 percent of museums in the United States accredited by the American Alliance of Museums. The RAFFMA's permanent collections consist of three distinct kinds of art: ancient, ceramic, and contemporary. A world-class collection of about 200 Egyptian artifacts and a smaller selection of Italian pottery are part of the museum's permanent holdings. Rotating shows feature artists from throughout the region and country. One gallery of the museum is dedicated to exhibiting the work of the school's own art students. The museum celebrated its 30th anniversary in 2026 and received accreditation by the American Alliance of Museums in 2008.

=== Palm Desert Campus ===
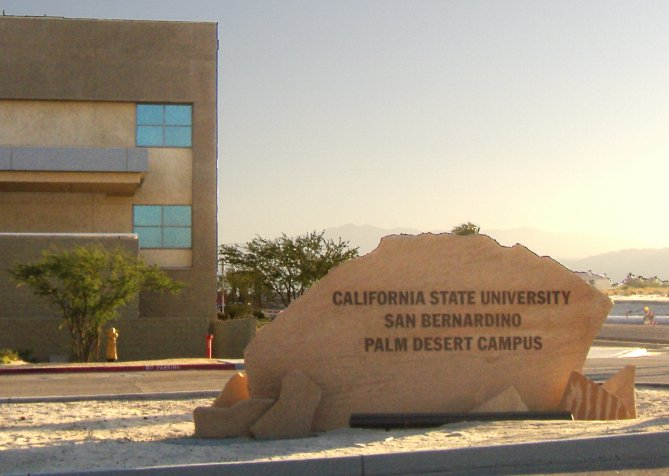
Palm Desert Campus

Opened in 1986, the California State University, San Bernardino Palm Desert Campus in Palm Desert, California (33°46′34″N 116°21′16″W) is a four-year college offering undergraduate and graduate degrees.

The Palm Desert Campus was initially built entirely with private funds. This public-private partnership was featured in a front-page story in the Sunday, August 3, 2003, edition of the New York Times. Its first state-funded building, the Student Success Center, is currently under construction (2025-2027). When completed, its 48,000 gross square feet will include a robust collection of student services (including the library).

Its highlighted list of programs include Hospitality Management, Cybersecurity, Entrepreneurship, Social Work, Kinesiology, and Child Development. Hospitality Management was developed specifically for the PDC.

=== Murillo Family Observatory ===
The Murillo Family Observatory is a teaching and research observatory at CSUSB, located on Badger Hill on the northern portion of campus. It is the newest research observatory in the Inland Empire and in the California State University system. The observatory consists of two telescopes which are used for research and teaching; a 20-inch Ritchey-Chretien and a 17-inch Corrected Dall-Kirkham Astrograph. It serves as both an academic and community resource, with public viewing nights and special astronomy events for the community.

== Organization and administration ==
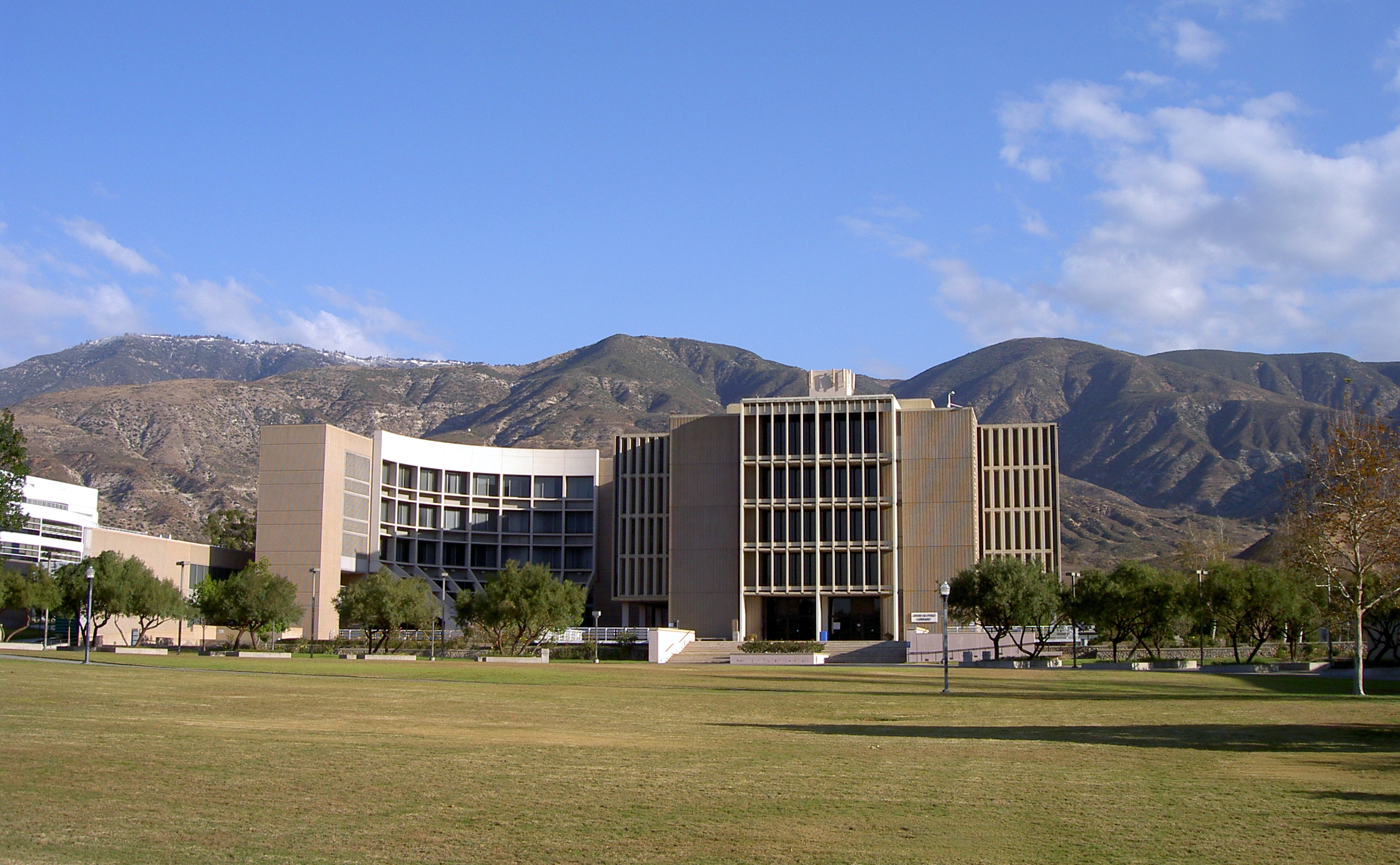
The John M. Pfau Library sits at the center of the San Bernardino campus.

San Bernardino-Riverside State College became a part of the California College System (now called the California State University system) in 1965 and eventually became California State University, San Bernardino in 1984. It, along with 21 other campuses, now forms the California State University system, which is the largest senior system of higher education in the United States.

The current president is S. Terri Gomez, who was chosen in 2026. A first-generation college student from California’s Inland Empire, she is the university’s fifth president and the first woman to serve in the position. Her most recent role was provost and vice president for academic affairs at Cal Poly Pomona.

== Academics ==
Undergraduate admission statistics
	Fall 2025	Fall 2024	Fall 2023	Fall 2022	Fall 2021
First-time Freshmen
Applicants	14,947	14,630	13,988	15,581	13,057
Admits	14,095	13,632	12,548	14,119	11,878
Admit rate	94%	93%	90%	91%	91%
Enrolled	2,162	2,090	2,244	2,324	2,001
Yield rate	15%	15%	18%	16%	17%
Transfers
Applicants	7,356	7,011	7,126	8,568	9,648
Admits	6,497	5,973	5,712	6,796	8,021
Admit rate	88%	85%	80%	79%	83%
Enrolled	2,633	2,243	2,010	2,468	2,830
Yield rate	41%	38%	35%	36%	35%

The university offers degree, credential, and certificate programs. It is divided into three Liberal Arts colleges,

- College of Arts and Letters
- College of Natural Sciences
- College of Social and Behavioral Sciences

and three vocational colleges:

- Jack H. Brown College of Business and Public Administration
- College of Education
- College of Extended Learning

Popular majors for undergraduates in 2018 included Business Administration (Management and Operations) at 23.01%, Psychology (General) at 14.31%, Criminal Justice and Corrections at 6.40%. For graduates, popular majors included Business Administration, Management and Operations at 17.47%, Social Work at 14.21%, and Education (General) at 10.82%.

The five most popular majors for 2019 graduates were:

- Business, Management, Marketing, and related support services at 25%
- Psychology at 14%
- Social Sciences at 10%
- Health Professions and related programs at 7%
- Homeland Security, Law Enforcement, Firefighting and related protective services at 6%

Cal State San Bernardino has taken a role in furthering the study and understanding Middle Eastern Cultures, and is the only CSU campus offering Arabic language and Islamic history courses. CSUSB's University Center for Developmental Disabilities is a clinical training program that provides evaluation, assessment, training, and support for autistic children, their parents, and siblings. CSUSB also offers a burgeoning program in Egyptology, with a Certificate in Egyptology offered through the Department of History and the opportunity to learn about Ancient Egypt at the Robert and Frances Fullerton Museum of Art RAFFMA that houses one of the largest collections of ancient Egyptian objects on the West Coast.

=== Business and National Security Studies ===
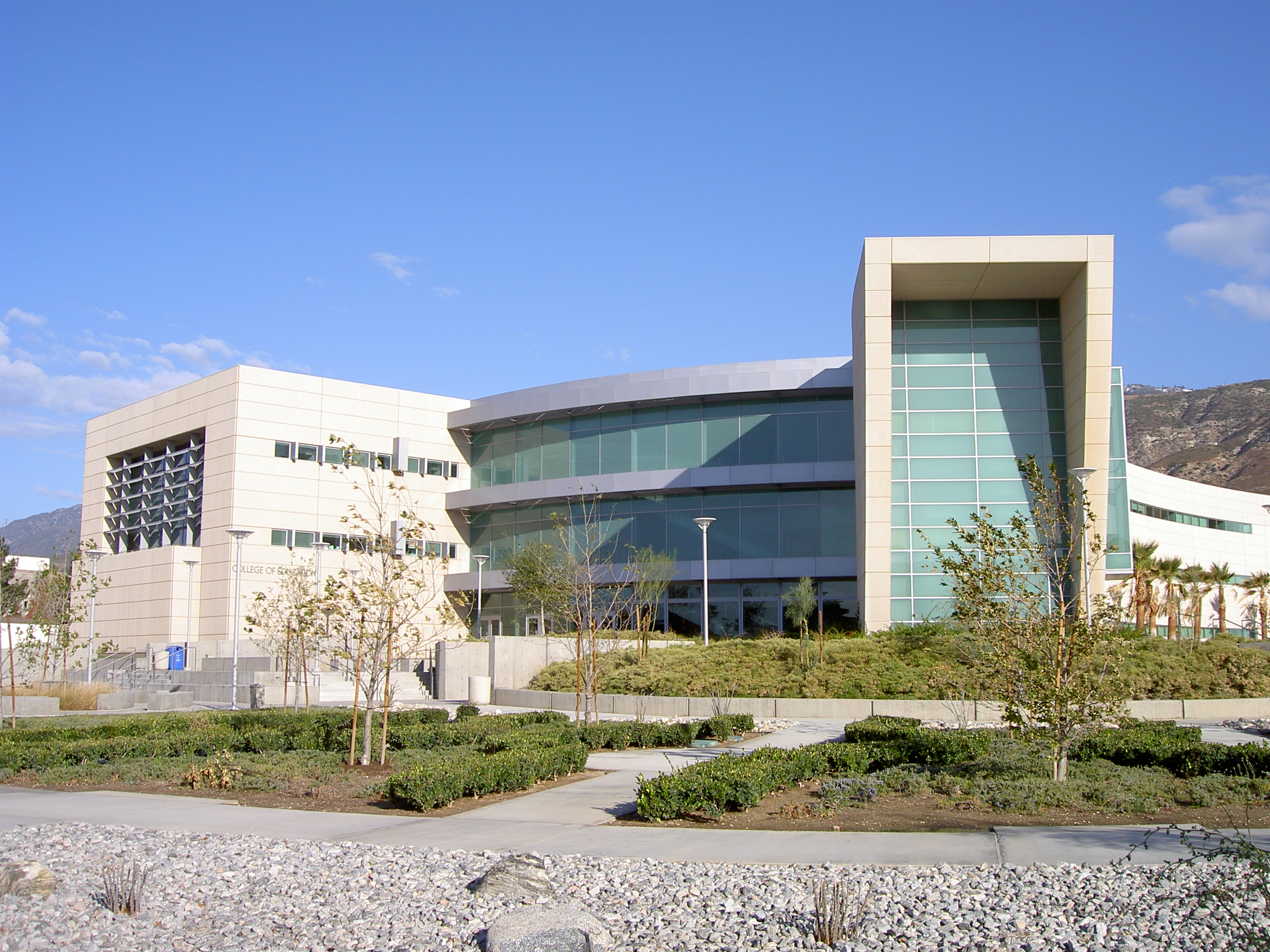
College of Education building

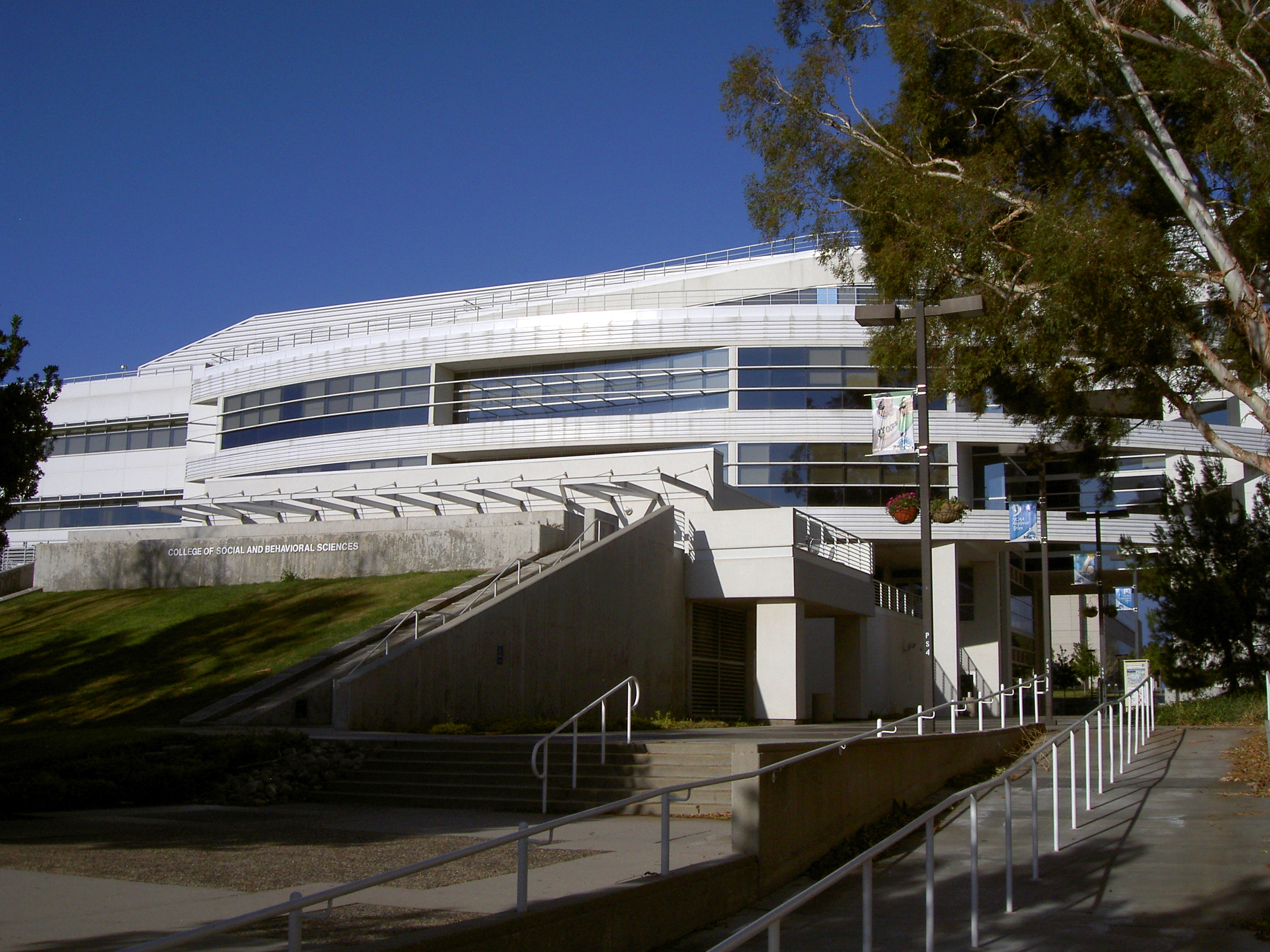
College of Social and Behavioral Sciences

Many CSUSB programs have earned specialized national and international accreditation, including the business program, which was the first in the Inland Empire to gain AACSB accreditation at both the graduate and undergraduate levels. AACSB accreditation represents the highest standard of achievement for business schools worldwide. Less than 5% of the world's 13,000 business programs have earned AACSB accreditation. AACSB-accredited schools produce graduates that are highly skilled and more desirable to employers than other non-accredited schools. The business and entrepreneurship programs are nationally recognized, as evidenced by CSUSB's 2006 ranking of fourth in the United States for graduate entrepreneur programs. The university's College of Business and Public Administration was also listed in the 2008 edition and the 2013 edition of The Princeton Review's "Best 290 Business Schools". In 2011, California State University, San Bernardino's Jack H. Brown College of Business and Public Administration was recognized by European CEO Magazine as one of the top 20 schools of business in the world and one of the world's 18 most innovative business schools.

The National Security Studies master of arts program is a nationally renown, two-year program that offers a comprehensive curriculum for students interested in pursuing careers in national service. It is one of three such programs in the country and the only one in the California State University system. The university also has collaborative educational programs with nearby Fort Irwin. In addition, CSUSB's advanced accounting students provide free tax preparation services to local low-income, elderly, disabled, non-English-speaking residents.

=== Jack Brown Hall ===
Many business and public administration classes take place in Jack Brown Hall, which was funded by Jack Brown, chairman of the board and chief executive officer of Stater Bros., and opened on September 23, 1991. Jack Brown pledged $1 million to building enhancements in 1992, which was the largest donation CSUSB had ever received at the time; as a result, CSUSB named the building after him. He also provided student scholarships.

=== Education ===
The university is one of the region's largest teacher-training institutions. In 2007, the university welcomed its first class of doctoral degree candidates. The Ed.D. in educational leadership is a research-based program that prepares pre-K through 12 and community college leaders to contribute to the study, development and implementation of educational reforms.

=== Admissions, enrollment and retention ===
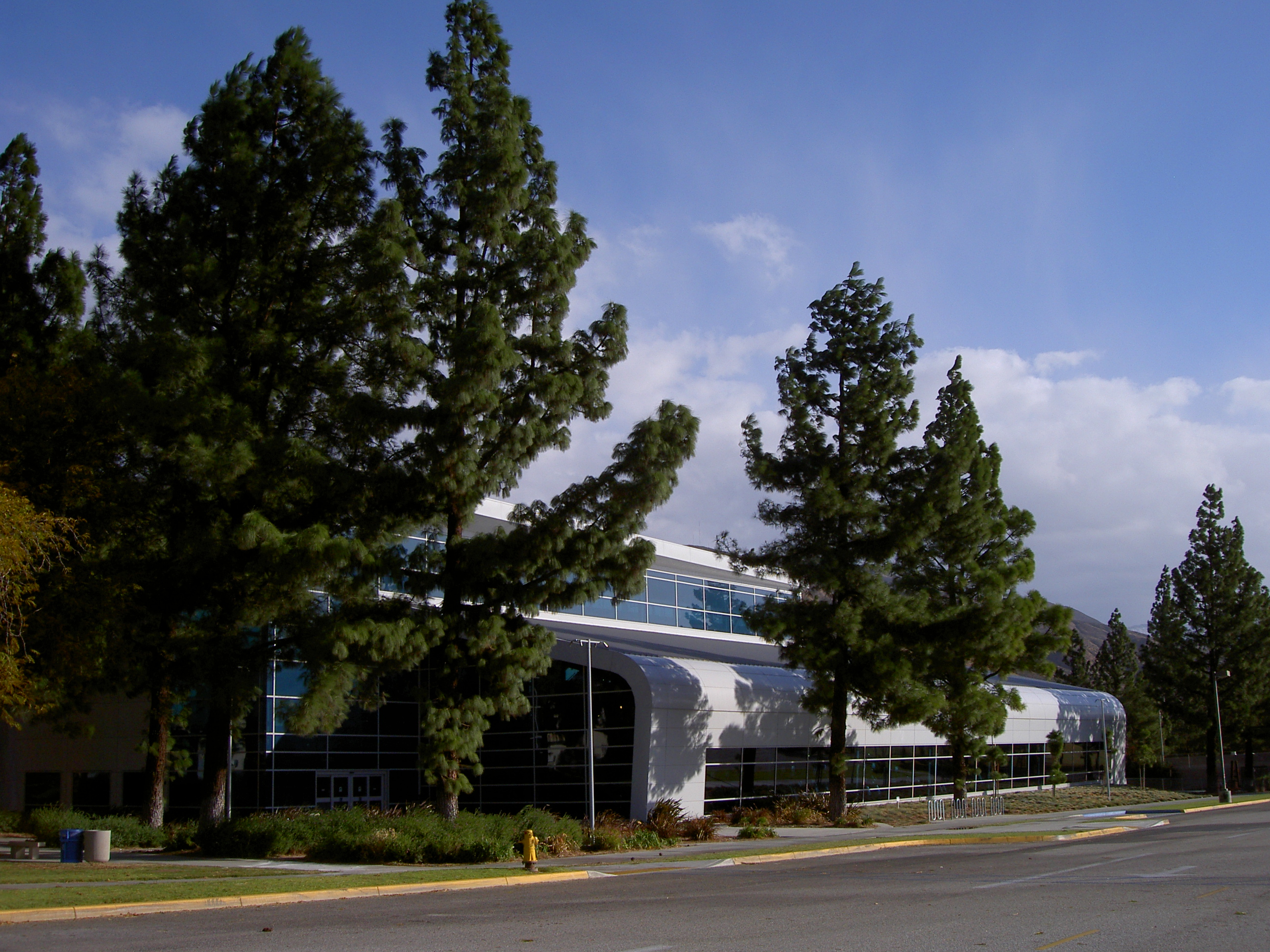
Student Recreation and Fitness Center

Admission to CSUSB is based on a combination of the applicant's high school cumulative grade point average (GPA) and standardized test scores. These factors are used to determine the applicant's California State University (CSU) eligibility index. More specifically, the eligibility index is a weighted combination of high school grade point average during the final three years of high school and a score on either the SAT or ACT. The average grade point average for incoming freshmen was 3.34. The average composite ACT score was 20 and the average SAT score was 900. Overall, 58.2% of applicants are accepted to CSUSB.

Enrollment has increased by more than a third in recent years, and freshman enrollment has doubled. Due to the large number of applicants in the fall 2010 quarter, CSUSB declared "campus impaction" for the first time in its history.

More than 70 percent of CSUSB students are the first generation of their families to attend college. Latino and African American student enrollments are the third highest of any university in California.

CSUSB students are awarded on average 13 percent of CSU system scholarships, despite representing only 4 percent of the CSU's overall enrollment. 57 percent of full-time undergraduate students at CSUSB receive sufficient scholarships and grants to pay all fees and another 10 percent pay less than the full fees. Almost 75 percent of CSUSB students receive financial aid.

More than three-quarters of the incoming 2009 freshmen class required remediation in either English or math, or both.

=== President's Academic Excellence Scholarship program ===
Initiated in 2002 by university president, Albert K. Karnig, the President's Academic Excellence Scholarship program invites the top 1 percent of graduating high school seniors in San Bernardino County to attend Cal State San Bernardino. The program provides a full scholarship, including tuition, books and a small stipend, to eligible students and is renewable for up to four academic years. The program is designed to attract the best and brightest students to CSUSB who might otherwise be lured to colleges outside the area. As of fall 2010, there were 132 enrolled presidential scholars. The first major donor to this program was Evelyn Magnuson, who extended her legacy in 2008 through a planned gift, making CSUSB a beneficiary of her $2.4 million estate.

=== Rankings ===
Academic rankings

National
- Forbes: 425
- U.S. News & World Report: 171
- Washington Monthly: 31
- WSJ/College Pulse: 401–500

2024-2025 U.S. News & World Report rankings
Top Performers on Social Mobility	12
Best Value University	48
Best Undergraduate Engineering Programs (nationwide, at schools where doctorate not offered)	78
Top Public University	92
Nursing	182
Economics	293-318

2024-2025 USNWR graduate school rankings
Program	Ranking
Rehabilitation Counseling	49
Education	114
Social Work	120
Public Affairs Programs	129
Public health	168
Fine Arts Programs	178

CEO Magazine ranked Cal State San Bernardino Tier One Top Global MBA Program and Best Value Schools ranked 1 Cal State San Bernardino on Best Online Criminal Justice Degree Program.

Money ranked Cal State San Bernardino 70th in the country out of the 744 schools it evaluated for its 2019–20 Best Value Colleges ranking.

Washington Monthly ranked Cal State San Bernardino 3rd in 2020 among 614 master's universities in the U.S. based on its contribution to the public good, as measured by social mobility, research, and promoting public service.

The Daily Beast ranked Cal State San Bernardino 115th in the country out of the nearly 2000 schools it evaluated for its 2013 Best Colleges ranking.

CSUSB Jack H. Brown College of Business and Public Administration ranks as one of the top 20 schools of business in the world and one of the world's 18 most innovative business schools.

The Princeton Review 2013 Edition ranked CSUSB Jack H. Brown College of Business as one of the top 296 "Best Business Schools" in 2013 worldwide.

== Student life ==
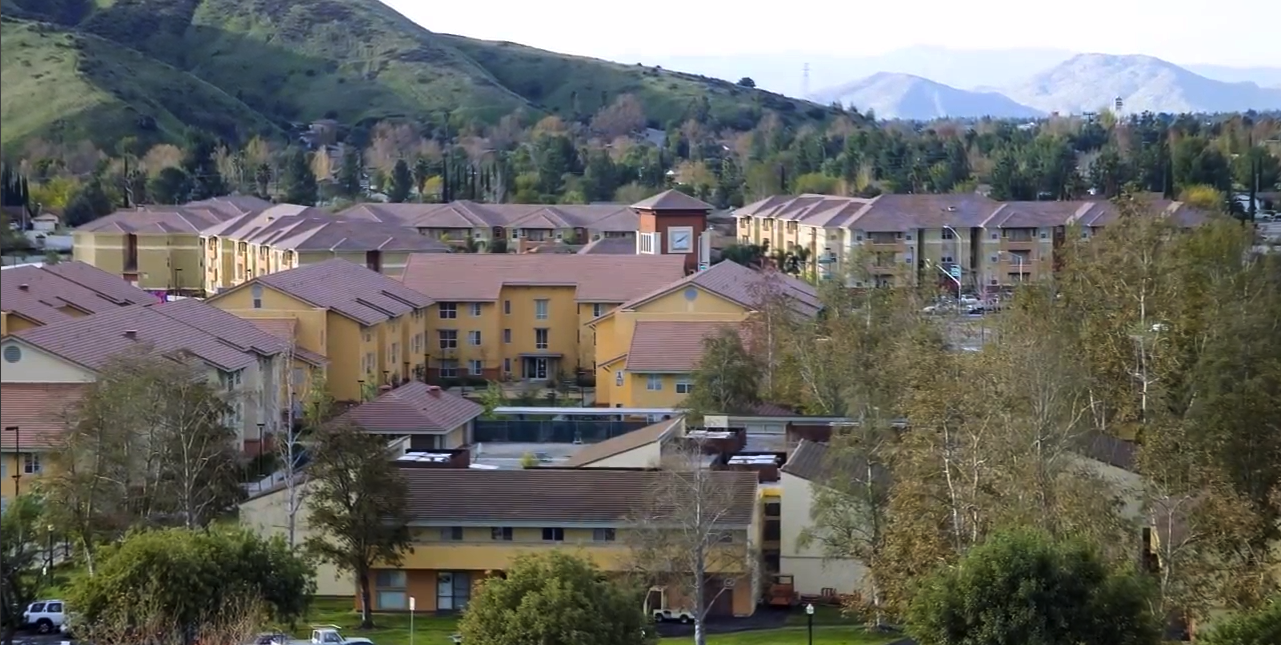
The villages on the campus of CSUSB

Like many other universities, much of the student life on campus revolves around extensive local outreach and retention programs. As of fall 2018 CSU San Bernardino has the largest enrollment percentage of Mexican Americans in the California State University system. CSUSB also has a very diverse campus of different ethnicities and nationalities. CSUSB is home to more than 100 student clubs and organizations.

=== Student newspaper ===

The Coyote Chronicle is the student newspaper. When classes are in session, it publishes every Monday throughout the school year. The current executive editor is Richard Bowie.

=== Student residence halls ===
Cal State San Bernardino's residence halls consist of three structures—Coyote Village, Arrowhead Village, and the University Village—which houses more than 1,400 students.

=== Student organizations, and activities ===
Student media organizations include the Coyote Chronicle, the student newspaper that is a part of the college media network, and Coyote Radio, a popular station for music, local news, talk and campus information. It is also one of only 50 college stations around the world listed as an official iTunes college station, and finished third in the MTVU Woodie Awards for best college radio station.

Undergraduate demographics as of Fall 2023
Race and ethnicity	Total
Hispanic	72%
White	10%
Asian	6%
Black	5%
Two or more races	3%
Unknown	2%
Foreign national	1%
Economic diversity
Low-income (Note: The percentage of students who received an income-based federal Pell grant intended for low-income students.)	59%
Affluent (Note: The percentage of students who are a part of the American middle class at the bare minimum.)	41%

=== Greek organizations ===
CSUSB has 15 social fraternity and sorority chapters.

=== Athletics ===
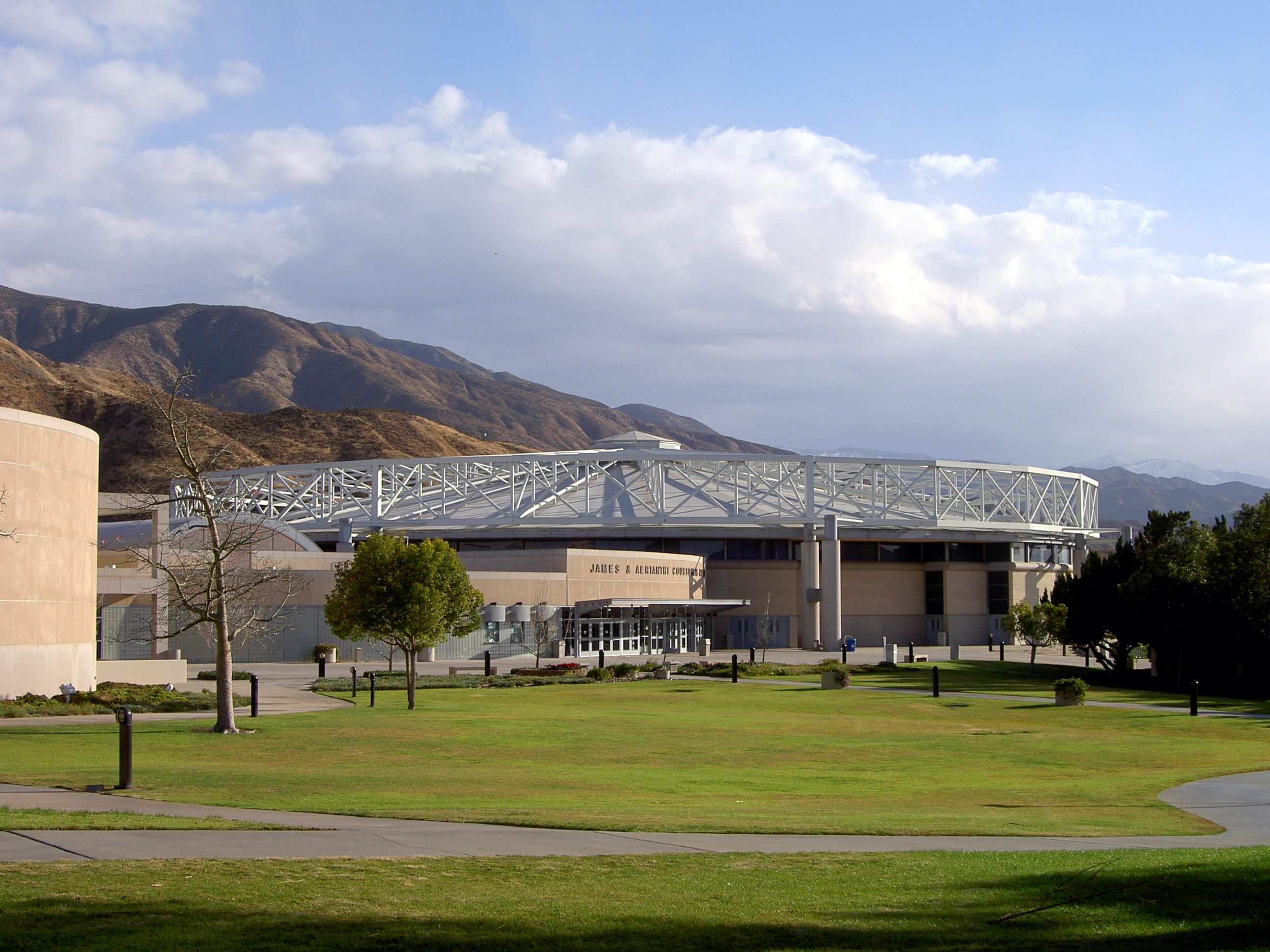
Coussoulis Arena

In 2009, CSUSB intercollegiate athletics celebrated its 25th anniversary. Established in 1984, the program offers men's and women's soccer and basketball, men's golf and baseball and women's softball, cross country, volleyball and track & field along with the Coyotes Spirit Squad. The school's athletic mascot is the Coyote and the school colors are blue (Pantone 300) and black.

The Coyotes play in the California Collegiate Athletic Association (CCAA) in the NCAA's Division II. The men's and women's basketball and women's volleyball teams play in the James & Aerianthi Coussoulis Arena, and the baseball team plays at Fiscalini Field in Perris Hill Park.

Since 1984, the Coyotes have taken many local and regional championships and regularly finish high up in national tournaments. The men's soccer team went to the NCAA Division III national semi-finals in 1987 and captured the university's first NCAA Division II California Collegiate Athletic Association title in 1991. In 1997, Scott Householder grabbed the university's sole national championship to date with a 273 for 72 holes, a record that still stands. Men's golf has finished third in the national tournament three times in its history.

The CSUSB women's volleyball team has won 15 CCAA and 8 West Region titles, has gone to the NCAA Division II quarter finals in 2017, semi-finals in 2003, in 2008, when it advanced to the finals, and three times, 2009, 2011 and 2019 when it won the final. Besides both being located in the east of California, but one in the south and the other in the north, San Bernardino and Stanisaus have competed heavily as conference rivals.

== Notable alumni and faculty ==
There are currently more than 84,000 alumni members in all 50 states and in over 35 countries.

=== Politics and government ===
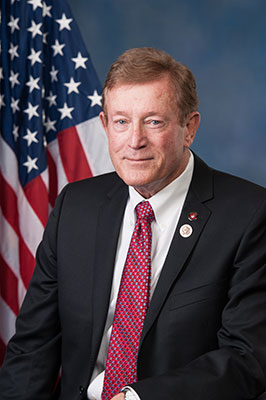
Paul Cook

- Anthony Adams, B.A. political science 1999 – California State Assemblyman, 59th district
- Joe Baca Jr., B.A. M.A. member of the California State Assembly from the 62nd District from 2004 until 2006.
- John J. Benoit, M.P.A. 1993 – California State Senate, 37th district
- Wilmer Carter, B.A. English 1972, M.A. education 1976 – California State Assemblymember, 62nd district since 2002
- Paul Cook, M.P.A. 1996 – Congressman serving California's 8th district; California State Assemblyman, 65th district 2006–2012
- Pedro Nava, B.A. sociology 1993 – California State Assemblyman, 35th district

=== Military ===
- Robert Eatinger – United States Navy, National Security Agency, and CIA lawyer
- Sandra Finan, B.A. 1978 – U.S. Air Force Brigadier General

=== Business ===
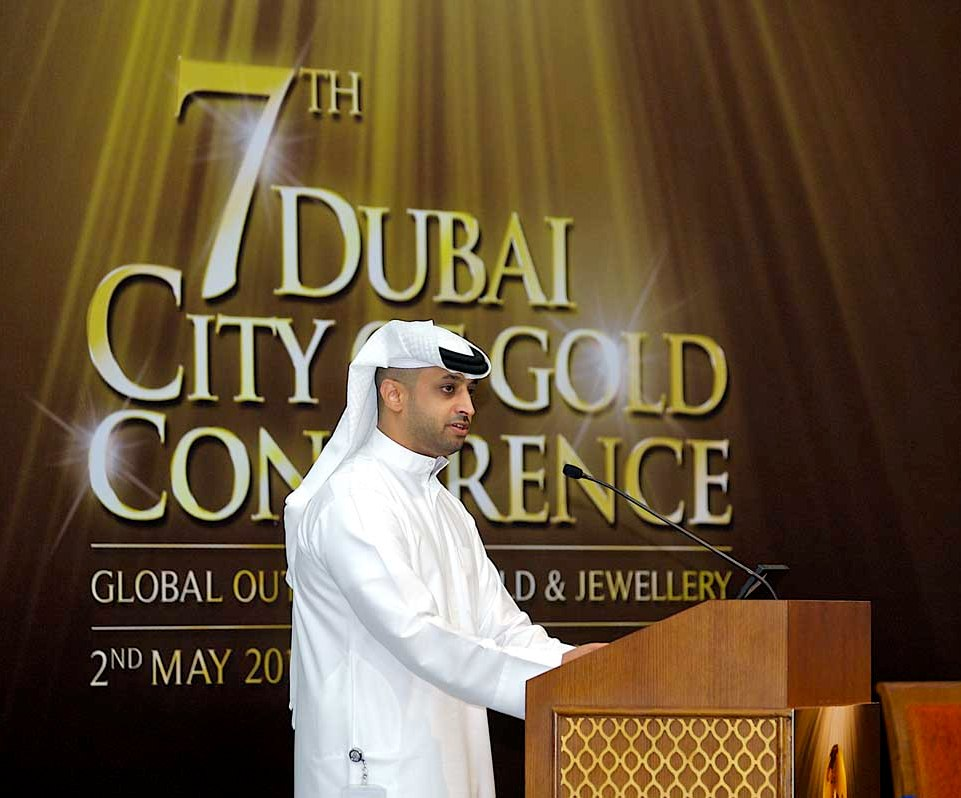
Ahmed Sultan Bin Sulayem

- Isabel Quintero B.A. in English; M.A. in English Composition

=== Athletics ===
- Jimmy Alapag – ember of Philippine National Basketball Team and basketball player
- Ernest Chavez – mixed martial artist, current UFC Lightweight
- James Cotton – basketball player in the NBA
- Abdi Faras – player for Somalia's national basketball team
- Alida Gray – judoka and MMA fighter
- Ivan Johnson, 2006–2007 – basketball player

=== Entertainers ===
- Abi Carter, B.A. 2023 – singer
- Sharon Jordan, M.A. 1986 – actress

=== Faculty ===
- Frances F. Berdan – professor of archaeology
- Gerald Scherba – professor of biology
- Alexander Sokoloff – geneticist, professor of biology. and department chair

== See also ==
- California Master Plan for Higher Education
