= Robert and Frances Fullerton Museum of Art =

- Established: 1996
- Location: San Bernardino, California
- Coordinates: 34°11′2″N 117°19′34″W
- Type: Art museum
- Website: http://raffma.csusb.edu

The Robert and Frances Fullerton Museum of Art, also known as RAFFMA, is an art museum of the California State University, San Bernardino main campus in San Bernardino, California.

RAFFMA's permanent collections includes a world-class collection of about 200 Ancient Egyptian artifacts, a smaller selection of Italian pottery and Asian ceramics, African art and contemporary art. Rotating shows feature artists from throughout the region and country. One gallery of the museum is dedicated to exhibiting the work of the school's own art students.

The museum celebrated its 20th anniversary in 2006 and received accreditation by the American Alliance of Museums in 2008. The museum is among the 4 percent of museums in the United States accredited by the American Alliance of Museums. The museum is the only accredited art museum in San Bernardino county.

The museum currently has the Journey to the Beyond exhibit available digitally online.
