= Murillo Family Observatory =

- Alternative names: Murillo Observatory
- Named after: Pauline Murillo
- Organization: California State University, San Bernardino
- Location: Badger Hill, San Bernardino, California
- Coordinates: 34.1869036°N 117.3179494°W
- Established: November 2011

Telescopes
- 20-inch Ritchey-Chretien
- 17-inch Corrected Dall-Kirkham Astrograph

Murillo Family Observatory is a teaching and research observatory for California State University, San Bernardino, located on Badger Hill on the northern portion of campus, in San Bernardino, the U.S. state of California. As of 2010, it was the newest research observatory in the Inland Empire and in the California State University system. The observatory consists of two telescopes which are used for research and teaching; a 20-inch Ritchey-Chretien and a 17-inch Corrected Dall-Kirkham Astrograph. In addition to the research telescopes the observatory has an observation deck with piers where small telescopes may be set up for undergraduate laboratory classes or open house nights. It serves as both an academic and community resource, with public viewing nights and special astronomy events for the community.
