= Coussoulis Arena =

Arena in San Bernardino, California, US

James & Aerianthi Coussoulis Arena
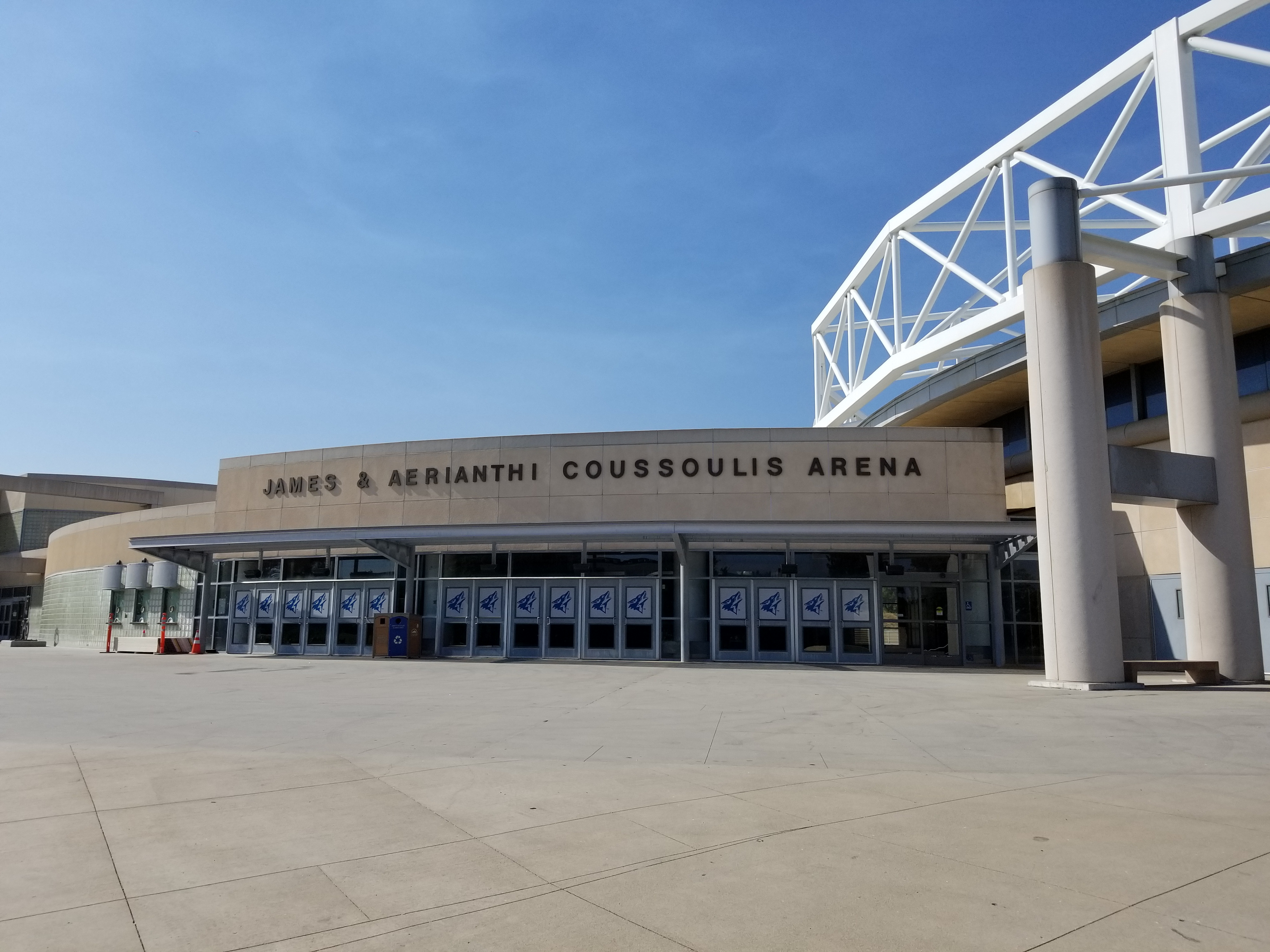
- Interactive map of James & Aerianthi Coussoulis Arena
- Location: San Bernardino, California
- Coordinates: 34.1831°N 117.3240°W
- Owner: California State University, San Bernardino
- Operator: California State University, San Bernardino
- Capacity: 4,140
- Surface: Multi-surface

Construction
- Opened: September 22, 1995

Tenants
- Cal State San Bernardino Coyotes men's basketball (NCAA); Cal State San Bernardino Coyotes women's basketball (NCAA); Cal State San Bernardino Coyotes women's volleyball (NCAA)

James and Aerianthi Coussoulis Arena or Coussoulis Arena is a 4,140-seat multi-purpose arena in San Bernardino, California, United States, on the campus of California State University, San Bernardino. It is named for James & Aerianthi Coussoulis.

It is home to the Cal State San Bernardino Coyotes men's basketball, women's basketball and women's volleyball teams. It hosts many other functions including commencement, concerts, Harlem Globetrotters basketball, WWE professional wrestling, comedy shows, band competitions and arts and music festivals.

== See also ==
- Cal State San Bernardino Coyotes
