= Cal State San Bernardino Coyotes =

Athletic teams of California State University, San Bernardino

- University: California State University, San Bernardino
- Conference: CCAA
- NCAA: Division II
- President: Tomás D. Morales
- Athletic director: Shareef Amer
- Location: San Bernardino, California
- First season: 1984
- Varsity teams: 10 (4 men's, 6 women's)
- Basketball arena: Coussoulis Arena
- Baseball stadium: Fiscalini Field
- Softball stadium: CSUSB Softball Park
- Soccer stadium: Premier Field
- Mascot: Cody Coyote
- Nickname: Yotes
- Colors: Blue, black, and white
- Website: csusbathletics.com
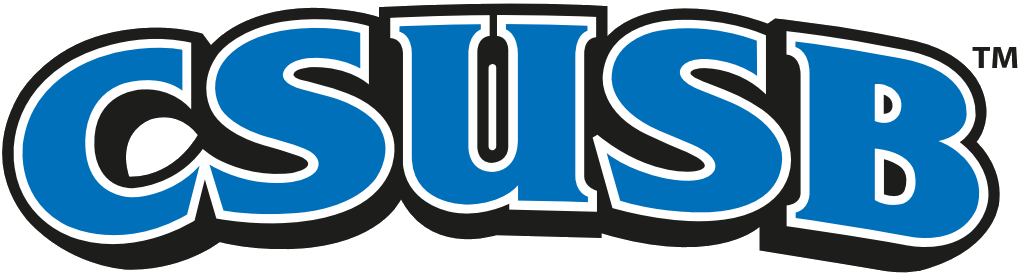

Team NCAA championships
- 1

Individual and relay NCAA champions
- 1

The Cal State San Bernardino Coyotes are the men's and women's intercollegiate athletic teams of California State University, San Bernardino. The athletic department was established in 1984 and the school's athletic mascot is the Coyotes, sometimes shortened as “Yotes” during cheers. The school's official colors are coyote blue and black.

The Coyotes compete in the California Collegiate Athletic Association (CCAA) in the NCAA's Division II.

== History ==
Cal State San Bernardino's athletics department started in 1984 and originally competed at the NCAA Division III level. In 1991-92, the department transitioned to NCAA Division II and joined the California Collegiate Athletics Association, where they have remained members since. The Yotes are the fourth-oldest team in the conference behind Cal State LA, Cal Poly Pomona, and Cal State Dominguez Hills.

== Mascot & Brand ==
From 1984 to 2020, CSUSB's athletics programs went exclusively by the Coyotes. In August 2019, the department began to roll out the Yotes brand. In August 2020, the department fully released the Yotes logo, as well as an updated coyote head mascot that replaced all gray with white. The names Yotes and Coyotes are both still used, though Yotes has become more common.

== Sports ==
Men's sports	Women's sports
Baseball	Basketball
Basketball	Cross country
Golf	Soccer
Soccer	Softball
	Track and field^{1}
	Volleyball
^{1} – includes both indoor and outdoor

The athletics department offers 10 sports, including: baseball, men's and women's basketball, women's cross country, men's golf, men's and women's soccer, softball, women's track and field, and women's volleyball.

== Championships ==
Since 1984, the Yotes have won one team and one individual national championship. In 2019, the Women's Volleyball team became only the third school in NCAA Division II history to go undefeated at 33-0 on its way to winning the national championship. CSUSB has also won many local and regional championships and regularly finishes high up in national tournaments. The men's soccer team went to the NCAA Division III national semifinals in 1987 and captured the university's first NCAA Division II California Collegiate Athletic Association title in 1991. In 1997, Scott Householder grabbed the university's first individual national championship with a 273 for 72 holes, a record that still stands. Men's golf has finished third in the national tournament three times in its history.

The men's baseball team took West Region titles in 1990 and 1991, advancing to the DIII College World Series both times. The men's basketball team has won four West Region titles, 11 CCAA regular season championships, 3 CCAA tournament championships, and has made two appearances in the NCAA Division II national semifinals.

The CSUSB women's volleyball team has won 14 CCAA and 8 West Region titles, went to the NCAA Division II quarterfinals (2017), semifinals three times, (2003, 2008), advanced to the finals, (2008, 2009, 2011) and 2019 when it won the final.

=== NCAA Appearances ===
The CSUSB Yotes competed in the NCAA Tournament across 8 active sports (3 men's and 4 women's) 65 times at the Division II level.

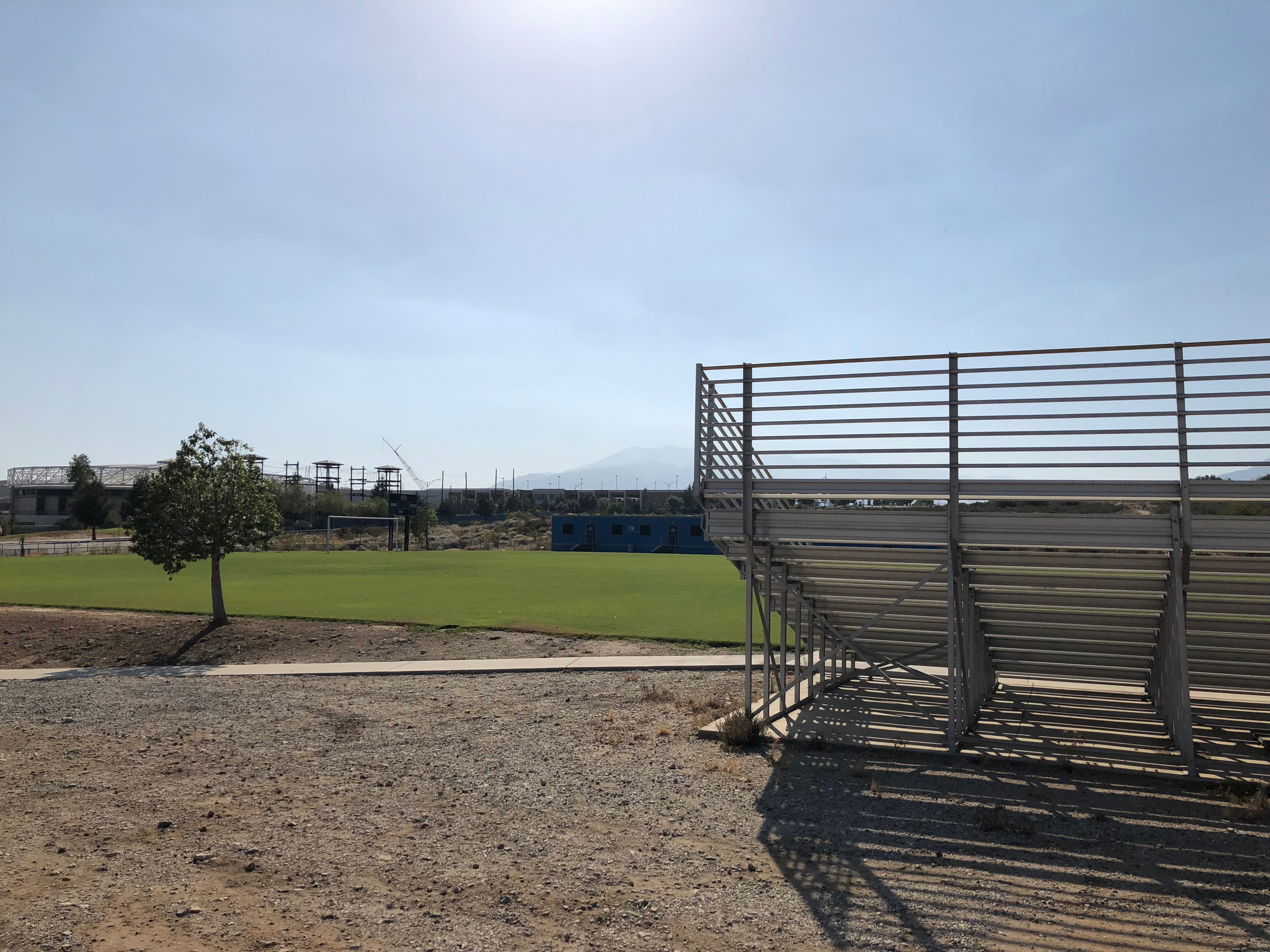
Coyote Premier Field, soccer venue

- Baseball (3): 1990, 1991, 2023
- Men's Basketball (17): 1999, 2000, 2001, 2002, 2003, 2004, 2005, 2007, 2008, 2009, 2010, 2013, 2014, 2020, 2022, 2023, 2024
- Women's Basketball (5): 1994, 1998, 2007, 2008, 2011
- Men's Golf (11): 1992, 1996, 1997, 1998, 2006, 2007, 2008, 2009, 2015, 2022, 2023
- Men's Soccer (3): 1991, 2009, 2010
- Women's Soccer (2): 2003, 2013
- Softball (5): 2008, 2011, 2017, 2018, 2023
- Women's Volleyball (22): 2000, 2001, 2002, 2003, 2004, 2005, 2006, 2007, 2008, 2009, 2010, 2011, 2012, 2013, 2014, 2015, 2016, 2017, 2018, 2019, 2021, 2022, 2023

=== Individual ===
Cal State San Bernardino has one individual NCAA championship at the Division II level.

NCAA individual championships
Order	School year	Athlete(s)	Sport	Source
1	1996–97	Scott Householder	Men's golf	

== Facilities ==
The men's and women's basketball and women's volleyball teams play in the James & Aerianthi Coussoulis Arena and the baseball team plays at Fiscalini Field. Both soccer teams compete at Premier Field while Softball plays at CSUSB Softball Park.
