= List of Clemson Tigers women's basketball seasons =

Intercollegiate basketball season

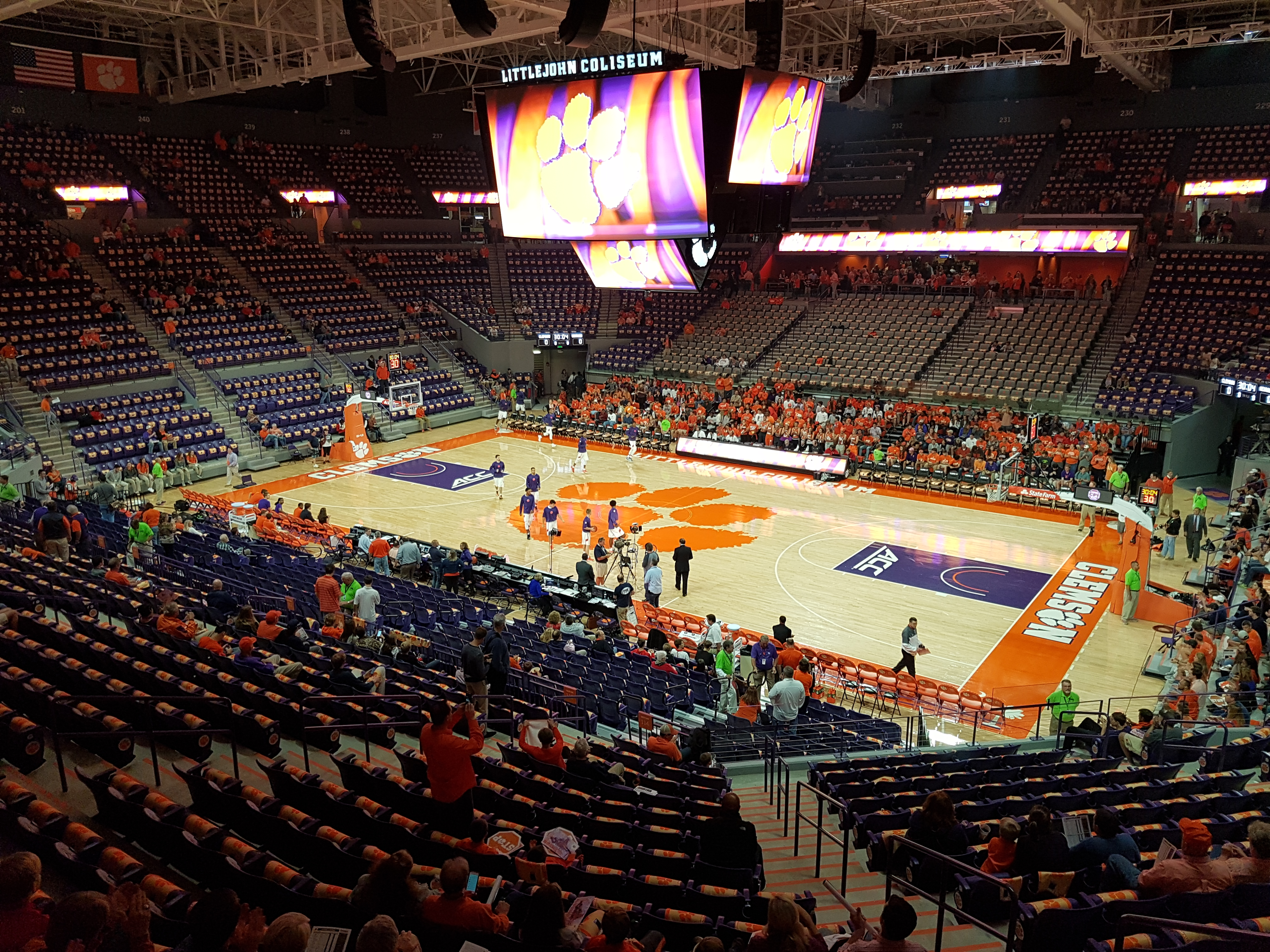
Clemson plays their home games in Littlejohn Coliseum.

The Clemson Tigers women's college basketball team competes in the National Collegiate Athletic Association's (NCAA) Division I, representing Clemson University in the Atlantic Coast Conference. Clemson has played its home games at Littlejohn Coliseum in Clemson, South Carolina since the team's inception in 1975.

Clemson started a women's basketball team during the 1975–76 season. They spent two years as an independent before the Atlantic Coast Conference began sponsoring the sport in 1977–78. The Tigers have reached the final of the ACC tournament on five occasions, winning twice in 1996 and 1999. Clemson received their first national postseason bid in 1980 to the National Women's Invitation Tournament (NWIT) and have participated in the tournament and its successor, the Women's National Invitation Tournament four times. In 1982, the Tigers were invited to the inaugural NCAA tournament. Their best NCAA showing to date was reaching the Elite Eight in 1991.

== Seasons ==
| Conference tournament champions* | Conference regular season champions^{‡} | Postseason bid^ |

| Season | Head coach | Conference | Season results | | | | | | | Tournament results | | Final poll (Note: The Associated Press began women's basketball team rankings during the 1976–77 season, and issues its final poll after the regular season. The Coaches' Poll began publishing its rankings during the 1985–86 season, and issues its final poll after the NCAA Tournament.) | |
| Season | Head coach | Conference | Overall | | | Conference | | | | Conference | Postseason | AP | Coaches' |
| Season | Head coach | Conference | Wins | Losses | % | Wins | Losses | % | Finish | Conference | Postseason | AP | Coaches' |
|---|---|---|---|---|---|---|---|---|---|---|---|---|---|
| 1975–76 | Mary King | Independent | 14 | 11 | .560 | — | — | — | — | — | AIAW Region II^ | N/A | N/A |
| 1976–77 | Annie Tribble | Independent | 22 | 9 | .710 | — | — | — | — | — | AIAW Region II^ | — | N/A |
| 1977–78 | Annie Tribble | Atlantic Coast Conference | 21 | 11 | .656 | 4 | 4 | .500 | 4th | Semifinal | AIAW Region II First Round^ | — | N/A |
| 1978–79 | Annie Tribble | Atlantic Coast Conference | 20 | 10 | .667 | 6 | 2 | .750 | 3rd | Semifinal | AIAW Region II First Round^ | — | N/A |
| 1979–80 | Annie Tribble | Atlantic Coast Conference | 24 | 12 | .667 | 6 | 3 | .667 | 3rd | Semifinal | AIAW Region II First Round; NWIT^ | — | N/A |
| 1980–81^{‡} | Annie Tribble | Atlantic Coast Conference | 23 | 8 | .742 | 6 | 1 | .857 | 1st^{‡} | Semifinal | AIAW Region II First Round; AIAW National second round^ | 20 | N/A |
| 1981–82 | Annie Tribble | Atlantic Coast Conference | 20 | 12 | .625 | 6 | 3 | .667 | 4th | final | NCAA first round^ | — | N/A |
| 1982–83 | Annie Tribble | Atlantic Coast Conference | 12 | 17 | .414 | 5 | 8 | .385 | 5th | Semifinal | — | — | N/A |
| 1983–84 | Annie Tribble | Atlantic Coast Conference | 21 | 10 | .677 | 9 | 5 | .643 | T-3rd | first round | NWIT^ | — | N/A |
| 1984–85 | Annie Tribble | Atlantic Coast Conference | 18 | 9 | .667 | 8 | 6 | .571 | 4th | first round | — | — | N/A |
| 1985–86 | Annie Tribble | Atlantic Coast Conference | 12 | 16 | .429 | 4 | 10 | .286 | T-6th | first round | — | — | — |
| 1986–87 | Annie Tribble | Atlantic Coast Conference | 7 | 21 | .250 | 3 | 11 | .214 | T-7th | first round | — | — | — |
| 1987–88 | Jim Davis | Atlantic Coast Conference | 21 | 9 | .700 | 8 | 6 | .571 | 4th | Semifinal | NCAA second round^ | — | 20 |
| 1988–89 | Jim Davis | Atlantic Coast Conference | 20 | 11 | .645 | 9 | 5 | .643 | 3rd | Semifinal | NCAA Sweet 16^ | — | 13 |
| 1989–90 | Jim Davis | Atlantic Coast Conference | 22 | 10 | .688 | 10 | 4 | .714 | 3rd | Semifinal | NCAA Sweet 16^ | — | 19 |
| 1990–91 | Jim Davis | Atlantic Coast Conference | 22 | 11 | .667 | 8 | 6 | .571 | 4th | final | NCAA Elite 8^ | 21 | 8 |
| 1991–92 | Jim Davis | Atlantic Coast Conference | 21 | 10 | .677 | 9 | 7 | .563 | T-3rd | Semifinal | NCAA first round^ | — | 19 |
| 1992–93 | Jim Davis | Atlantic Coast Conference | 19 | 11 | .633 | 8 | 8 | .500 | T-4th | Semifinal | NCAA second round^ | 20 | — |
| 1993–94 | Jim Davis | Atlantic Coast Conference | 20 | 10 | .667 | 11 | 5 | .688 | 3rd | Semifinal | NCAA second round^ | — | 22 |
| 1994–95 | Jim Davis | Atlantic Coast Conference | 21 | 11 | .656 | 9 | 7 | .563 | 5th | Quarterfinal | NWIT^ | — | — |
| 1995–96* | Jim Davis | Atlantic Coast Conference | 23 | 8 | .742 | 11 | 5 | .688 | 4th | Champions | NCAA second round^ | 14 | 17 |
| 1996–97 | Jim Davis | Atlantic Coast Conference | 19 | 11 | .633 | 8 | 8 | .500 | 6th | final | NCAA first round^ | 21 | 25 |
| 1997–98 | Jim Davis | Atlantic Coast Conference | 25 | 8 | .758 | 12 | 4 | .750 | T-2nd | final | NCAA second round^ | 14 | 21 |
| 1998–99* | Jim Davis | Atlantic Coast Conference | 26 | 6 | .813 | 11 | 5 | .688 | T-3rd | Champions | NCAA Sweet 16^ | T-10 | T-10 |
| 1999–2000 | Jim Davis | Atlantic Coast Conference | 19 | 12 | .613 | 9 | 7 | .563 | 4th | Quarterfinal | NCAA second round^ | — | — |
| 2000–01 | Jim Davis | Atlantic Coast Conference | 21 | 10 | .677 | 10 | 6 | .625 | 2nd | Semifinal | NCAA second round^ | 22 | 22 |
| 2001–02 | Jim Davis | Atlantic Coast Conference | 17 | 12 | .586 | 9 | 7 | .563 | T-3rd | Quarterfinal | NCAA first round^ | — | — |
| 2002–03 | Jim Davis | Atlantic Coast Conference | 14 | 15 | .483 | 5 | 11 | .313 | 7th | Quarterfinal | — | — | — |
| 2003–04 | Jim Davis | Atlantic Coast Conference | 17 | 12 | .586 | 7 | 9 | .438 | 5th | Quarterfinal | WNIT First Round^ | — | — |
| 2004–05 | Jim Davis | Atlantic Coast Conference | 8 | 20 | .286 | 2 | 12 | .143 | 11th | first round | — | — | — |
| 2005–06 | Cristy McKinney | Atlantic Coast Conference | 8 | 21 | .276 | 2 | 12 | .143 | T-11th | first round | — | — | — |
| 2006–07 | Cristy McKinney | Atlantic Coast Conference | 12 | 18 | .400 | 4 | 10 | .286 | 9th | first round | — | — | — |
| 2007–08 | Cristy McKinney | Atlantic Coast Conference | 12 | 19 | .387 | 4 | 10 | .286 | 9th | Quarterfinal | — | — | — |
| 2008–09 | Cristy McKinney | Atlantic Coast Conference | 14 | 17 | .452 | 2 | 12 | .143 | T-10th | Quarterfinal | — | — | — |
| 2009–10 | Cristy McKinney | Atlantic Coast Conference | 13 | 18 | .419 | 4 | 10 | .286 | T-10th | first round | — | — | — |
| 2010–11 | Itoro Coleman | Atlantic Coast Conference | 10 | 20 | .333 | 3 | 11 | .214 | 11th | first round | — | — | — |
| 2011–12 | Itoro Coleman | Atlantic Coast Conference | 6 | 22 | .214 | 2 | 14 | .125 | T-11th | first round | — | — | — |
| 2012–13 | Itoro Coleman | Atlantic Coast Conference | 9 | 21 | .300 | 5 | 13 | .278 | T-9th | first round | — | — | — |
| 2013–14 | Audra Smith | Atlantic Coast Conference | 13 | 19 | .419 | 4 | 12 | .250 | T-12th | second round | — | — | — |
| 2014–15 | Audra Smith | Atlantic Coast Conference | 9 | 21 | .300 | 1 | 15 | .063 | T-14th | first round | — | — | — |
| 2015–16 | Audra Smith | Atlantic Coast Conference | 4 | 26 | .133 | 0 | 16 | .000 | 15th | first round | — | — | — |
| 2016–17 | Audra Smith | Atlantic Coast Conference | 15 | 16 | .484 | 3 | 13 | .188 | T-13th | second round | — | — | — |
| 2017–18 | Audra Smith | Atlantic Coast Conference | 11 | 19 | .367 | 1 | 15 | .063 | 15th | first round | — | — | — |
| 2018–19 | Amanda Butler | Atlantic Coast Conference | 20 | 13 | .606 | 9 | 7 | .563 | 7th | quarterfinals | NCAA Second Round^ | — | — |
| 2019–20 | Amanda Butler | Atlantic Coast Conference | 8 | 23 | .258 | 3 | 15 | .167 | 14th | second round | — | — | — |
| 2020–21 | Amanda Butler | Atlantic Coast Conference | 12 | 14 | .462 | 5 | 12 | .294 | 11th | quarterfinals | WNIT, second round^ | — | — |
| 2021–22 | Amanda Butler | Atlantic Coast Conference | 10 | 21 | .323 | 3 | 15 | .167 | 13th | second round | — | — | — |
| 2022–23 | Amanda Butler | Atlantic Coast Conference | 19 | 16 | .543 | 7 | 11 | .389 | 10th | second round | WNIT, Super 16^ | — | — |
| Totals | | Atlantic Coast Conference | 774 | 687 | .530 | 275 | 398 | .409 | | | | | |
