= Clemson Tigers women's basketball, 1975–1979 =

American college basketball seasons

The Clemson Tigers women's basketball teams of 1975–1979 represented Clemson University in college basketball competition.

== 1975–76 ==
1975–76 Clemson Tigers women's basketball
- Conference: Independent
- Record: 14–11
- Head coach: Mary King
- Home arena: Littlejohn Coliseum

| Date time, TV | Opponent | Result | Record | Site city, state |
|---|---|---|---|---|
| December 6, 1975* | Davidson | W 55–51 | 1–0 | Littlejohn Coliseum; Clemson, South Carolina |
| January 7, 1976* | Erskine | W 66–52 | 2–0 | Littlejohn Coliseum; Clemson, South Carolina |
| January 10, 1976* | at South Carolina rivalry | W 66–61 | 3–0 | Carolina Coliseum; Columbia, South Carolina |
| January 14, 1976* | Anderson (SC) | L 70–85 | 3–1 | Littlejohn Coliseum; Clemson, South Carolina |
| January 16, 1976* | at College of Charleston | L 68–87 | 3–2 | Charleston, South Carolina |
| January 17, 1976* | at Charleston Southern | W 68–66 | 4–2 | CSU Field House; North Charleston, South Carolina |
| January 23, 1976* | at Francis Marion; Francis Marion Invitational | W 76–64 | 5–2 | Smith University Center; Florence, South Carolina |
| January 24, 1976* | vs. Anderson (SC); Francis Marion Invitational | L 60–75 | 5–3 | Smith University Center; Florence, South Carolina |
| January 28, 1976* | Furman | W 97–47 | 6–3 | Littlejohn Coliseum; Clemson, South Carolina |
| January 30, 1976* | at Columbia (SC) | L 56–60 | 6–4 | Porter Gymnasium; Columbia, South Carolina |
| February 3, 1976* | at Winthrop | L 70–82 | 6–5 | Rock Hill, South Carolina |
| February 5, 1976* | vs. North Carolina; Virginia Invitational | L 71–85 | 6–6 | University Hall; Charlottesville, Virginia |
| February 6, 1976* | vs. VCU; Virginia Invitational | W 65–51 | 7–6 | University Hall; Charlottesville, Virginia |
| February 11, 1976* | North Greenville | L 54–69 | 7–7 | Littlejohn Coliseum; Clemson, South Carolina |
| February 14, 1976* | Columbia (SC) | W 85–43 | 8–7 | Littlejohn Coliseum; Clemson, South Carolina |
| February 16, 1976* | at Anderson (SC) | L 55–89 | 8–8 | Anderson, South Carolina |
| February 21, 1976* | South Carolina rivalry | W 73–62 | 9–8 | Littlejohn Coliseum; Clemson, South Carolina |
| February 25, 1976* | at Erskine | W 67–66 | 10–8 | Due West, South Carolina |
| February 28, 1976* | Charleston Southern | W 88–44 | 11–8 | Littlejohn Coliseum; Clemson, South Carolina |
| March 4, 1976* | vs. Columbia (SC); SCAIAW Tournament | W 75–56 | 12–8 | Anderson, South Carolina |
| March 5, 1976* | vs. College of Charleston; SCAIAW Tournament | L 72–84 | 12–9 | Anderson, South Carolina |
| March 6, 1976* | vs. South Carolina State; SCAIAW Tournament | W 73–60 | 13–9 | Anderson, South Carolina |
| March 11, 1976* | vs. Bridgewater; AIAW Region II Tournament | W 68–63 | 14–9 | Covington, Kentucky |
| March 12, 1976* | vs. Union (TN); AIAW Region II Tournament | L 77–92 | 14–10 | Covington, Kentucky |
| March 13, 1976* | vs. High Point; AIAW Region II Tournament | L 78–105 | 14–11 | Covington, Kentucky |
*Non-conference game. (#) Tournament seedings in parentheses.

== 1976–77 ==
1976–77 Clemson Tigers women's basketball
- Conference: Independent
- Record: 22–9
- Head coach: Annie Tribble
- Home arena: Littlejohn Coliseum

| Date time, TV | Opponent | Result | Record | Site city, state |
|---|---|---|---|---|
| December 1, 1976* | Columbia (SC) | W 88–47 | 1–0 | Littlejohn Coliseum; Clemson, South Carolina |
| December 4, 1976* | Charleston Southern | W 104–36 | 2–0 | Littlejohn Coliseum; Clemson, South Carolina |
| December 11, 1976* | NC State | L 82–94 | 2–1 | Littlejohn Coliseum; Clemson, South Carolina |
| December 13, 1976* | at Lander | W 63–57 | 3–1 | Greenwood, South Carolina |
| December 17, 1976* | vs. No. 19 Tennessee; Mississippi University for Women Christmas Tournament | L 61–87 | 3–2 | Pohl Gymnasium; Columbus, Mississippi |
| December 18, 1976* | vs. Central Missouri State; Mississippi University for Women Christmas Tournament | L 76–86 | 3–3 | Pohl Gymnasium; Columbus, Mississippi |
| December 19, 1976* | vs. Pittsburgh; Mississippi University for Women Christmas Tournament | L 74–87 | 3–4 | Pohl Gymnasium; Columbus, Mississippi |
| January 8, 1977* | College of Charleston | L 61–71 | 3–5 | Littlejohn Coliseum; Clemson, South Carolina |
| January 12, 1977* | at Erskine | W 74–42 | 4–5 | Due West, South Carolina |
| January 15, 1977* | North Carolina | W 79–59 | 5–5 | Littlejohn Coliseum; Clemson, South Carolina |
| January 19, 1977* | Georgia State | L 78–83 | 5–6 | Littlejohn Coliseum; Clemson, South Carolina |
| January 22, 1977* | at South Carolina rivalry | W 92–60 | 6–6 | Carolina Coliseum; Columbia, South Carolina |
| January 26, 1977* | at Furman | W 97–51 | 7–6 | Alley Gymnasium; Greenville, South Carolina |
| January 29, 1977* | Winthrop | W 97–74 | 8–6 | Littlejohn Coliseum; Clemson, South Carolina |
| February 1, 1977* | Erskine | W 70–49 | 9–6 | Littlejohn Coliseum; Clemson, South Carolina |
| February 3, 1977* | Francis Marion | W 83–70 | 10–6 | Littlejohn Coliseum; Clemson, South Carolina |
| February 5, 1977* | at Charleston Southern | W 103–47 | 11–6 | CSU Field House; North Charleston, South Carolina |
| February 9, 1977* | at Davidson | W 83–38 | 12–6 | Davidson, North Carolina |
| February 12, 1977* | at Columbia (SC) | W 79–45 | 13–6 | Porter Gymnasium; Columbia, South Carolina |
| February 16, 1977* | South Carolina State | W 93–77 | 14–6 | Littlejohn Coliseum; Clemson, South Carolina |
| February 19, 1977* | at Francis Marion | L 82–83 | 14–7 | Smith University Center; Florence, South Carolina |
| February 22, 1977* | at Georgia State | W 74–66 | 15–7 | GSU Sports Arena; Atlanta, Georgia |
| February 23, 1977* | South Carolina rivalry | W 80–74 | 16–7 | Littlejohn Coliseum; Clemson, South Carolina |
| February 26, 1977* | Gardner–Webb | W 136–39 | 17–7 | Littlejohn Coliseum; Clemson, South Carolina |
| March 4, 1977* | vs. Winthrop; SCAIAW Tournament | W 88–83 | 18–7 | Charleston, South Carolina |
| March 4, 1977* | vs. Claflin; SCAIAW Tournament | W 74–68 | 19–7 | Charleston, South Carolina |
| March 5, 1977* | at College of Charleston; SCAIAW Tournament | L 67–81 | 19–8 | Charleston, South Carolina |
| March 5, 1977* | vs. North Greenville; SCAIAW Tournament | W 88–76 | 20–8 | Charleston, South Carolina |
| March 10, 1977* | vs. No. 10 Tennessee; AIAW Region II Tournament | L 46–84 | 20–9 | Memphis Fieldhouse; Memphis, Tennessee |
| March 10, 1977* | vs. Morehead State; AIAW Region II Tournament | W 82–66 | 21–9 | Memphis Fieldhouse; Memphis, Tennessee |
| March 10, 1977* | at No. 16 Memphis State; AIAW Region II Tournament | W 79–72 | 22–9 | Memphis Fieldhouse; Memphis, Tennessee |
*Non-conference game. (#) Tournament seedings in parentheses.

== 1977–78 ==
1977–78 Clemson Tigers women's basketball
- Conference: Atlantic Coast Conference
- Record: 21–11 (4–4 ACC)
- Head coach: Annie Tribble
- Home arena: Littlejohn Coliseum

| Date time, TV | Opponent | Result | Record | Site city, state |
|---|---|---|---|---|
| November 28, 1977* | at No. 1 Tennessee | L 70–88 | 0–1 | Stokely Athletic Center; Knoxville, Tennessee |
| December 3, 1977* | Mercer | W 95–81 | 1–1 | Littlejohn Coliseum; Clemson, South Carolina |
| December 5, 1977 | at Wake Forest | W 108–53 | 2–1 (1–0) | Winston-Salem, North Carolina |
| December 7, 1977* | Claflin | W 95–51 | 3–1 (1–0) | Littlejohn Coliseum; Clemson, South Carolina |
| December 10, 1977* | at South Carolina rivalry | L 66–69 | 3–2 (1–0) | Carolina Coliseum; Columbia, South Carolina |
| December 17, 1977* | Appalachian State | W 101–81 | 4–2 (1–0) | Littlejohn Coliseum; Clemson, South Carolina |
| December 20, 1977* | vs. Mercer; North Carolina Christmas Classic | W 109–66 | 5–2 (1–0) | Carmichael Arena; Chapel Hill, North Carolina |
| December 21, 1977 | vs. No. 5 NC State; North Carolina Christmas Classic | L 82–84 | 5–3 (1–1) | Carmichael Arena; Chapel Hill, North Carolina |
| December 22, 1977 | at North Carolina; North Carolina Christmas Classic | L 79–95 | 5–4 (1–2) | Carmichael Arena; Chapel Hill, North Carolina |
| January 4, 1978* | Georgia State | W 94–58 | 6–4 (1–2) | Littlejohn Coliseum; Clemson, South Carolina |
| January 7, 1978* | South Carolina rivalry | W 69–66 | 7–4 (1–2) | Littlejohn Coliseum; Clemson, South Carolina |
| January 11, 1978 | Duke | W 118–59 | 8–4 (2–2) | Littlejohn Coliseum; Clemson, South Carolina |
| January 13, 1978* | Yale; Clemson Lady Tiger Invitational | W 101–66 | 9–4 (2–2) | Littlejohn Coliseum; Clemson, South Carolina |
| January 14, 1978* | South Carolina; Clemson Lady Tiger Invitational, rivalry | W 79–66 | 10–4 (2–2) | Littlejohn Coliseum; Clemson, South Carolina |
| January 16, 1978* | at Francis Marion | W 73–71 | 11–4 (2–2) | Smith University Center; Florence, South Carolina |
| January 19, 1978 | at No. 8 Maryland | L 86–91 | 11–5 (2–3) | Cole Field House; College Park, Maryland |
| January 21, 1978 | Virginia | W 86–58 | 12–5 (3–3) | Littlejohn Coliseum; Clemson, South Carolina |
| January 23, 1978* | at College of Charleston | L 82–91 | 12–6 (3–3) | Charleston, South Carolina |
| January 26, 1978 | at No. 2 NC State | L 74–98 | 12–7 (3–4) | Reynolds Coliseum; Raleigh, North Carolina |
| January 28, 1978* | at North Carolina | W 76–73 | 13–7 (4–4) | Carmichael Arena; Chapel Hill, North Carolina |
| February 1, 1978* | Winthrop | W 81–67 | 14–7 (4–4) | Littlejohn Coliseum; Clemson, South Carolina |
| February 4, 1978* | College of Charleston | W 93–60 | 15–7 (4–4) | Littlejohn Coliseum; Clemson, South Carolina |
| February 8, 1978* | Erskine | W 84–42 | 16–7 (4–4) | Littlejohn Coliseum; Clemson, South Carolina |
| February 9, 1978* | at Virginia; ACC Tournament | W 73–59 | 17–7 (4–4) | University Hall; Charlottesville, Virginia |
| February 10, 1978* | vs. No. 7 Maryland; ACC Tournament | L 76–98 | 17–8 (4–4) | University Hall; Charlottesville, Virginia |
| February 13, 1978* | Lander | W 94–50 | 18–8 (4–4) | Littlejohn Coliseum; Clemson, South Carolina |
| February 15, 1978* | South Carolina State | L 61–81 | 18–9 (4–4) | SHM Memorial Center; Orangeburg, South Carolina |
| February 18, 1978* | Francis Marion | W 78–72 | 19–9 (4–4) | Littlejohn Coliseum; Clemson, South Carolina |
| February 23, 1978* | Erskine; SCAIAW Large College Qualifying | W 89–57 | 20–9 (4–4) | Littlejohn Coliseum; Clemson, South Carolina |
| February 24, 1978* | College of Charleston; SCAIAW Large College Qualifying | L 67–78 | 20–10 (4–4) | Littlejohn Coliseum; Clemson, South Carolina |
| February 25, 1978* | Francis Marion; SCAIAW Large College Qualifying | W 80–75 | 21–10 (4–4) | Littlejohn Coliseum; Clemson, South Carolina |
| March 3, 1978* | vs. College of Charleston; AIAW Regional Qualifying | L 95–97 | 21–11 (4–4) | Aiken, South Carolina |
*Non-conference game. (#) Tournament seedings in parentheses.

== 1978–79 ==
1978–79 Clemson Tigers women's basketball
- Conference: Atlantic Coast Conference
- Record: 20–10 (6–2 ACC)
- Head coach: Annie Tribble
- Home arena: Littlejohn Coliseum

| Date time, TV | Rank^{#} | Opponent^{#} | Result | Record | Site city, state |
|---|---|---|---|---|---|
| November 27, 1978* | | Georgia | W 77–53 | 1–0 | Littlejohn Coliseum; Clemson, South Carolina |
| November 29, 1978* | | No. 1 Tennessee | L 66–75 | 1–1 | Littlejohn Coliseum; Clemson, South Carolina |
| December 2, 1978* | | at Mercer | W 93–81 | 2–1 | Porter Gym; Macon, Georgia |
| December 6, 1978* | | at South Carolina rivalry | L 60–77 | 2–2 | Carolina Coliseum; Columbia, South Carolina |
| December 9, 1978* | | Francis Marion | W 118–64 | 3–2 | Littlejohn Coliseum; Clemson, South Carolina |
| December 16, 1978* | | North Georgia | W 89–62 | 4–2 | Littlejohn Coliseum; Clemson, South Carolina |
| December 21, 1978* | | vs. Pittsburgh; North Carolina Christmas Classic | W 75–68 | 5–2 | Carmichael Arena; Chapel Hill, North Carolina |
| December 22, 1978 | | at North Carolina; North Carolina Christmas Classic | W 79–66 | 6–2 (1–0) | Carmichael Arena; Chapel Hill, North Carolina |
| December 23, 1978* | | vs. Kansas State; North Carolina Christmas Classic | L 70–73 | 6–3 (1–0) | Carmichael Arena; Chapel Hill, North Carolina |
| January 10, 1979* | | William & Mary; Clemson Lady Tiger Invitational | W 102–49 | 7–3 (1–0) | Littlejohn Coliseum; Clemson, South Carolina |
| January 11, 1979* | | East Carolina; Clemson Lady Tiger Invitational | W 61–60 | 8–3 (1–0) | Littlejohn Coliseum; Clemson, South Carolina |
| January 13, 1979 | | No. 3 Maryland | L 71–84 | 8–4 (1–1) | Littlejohn Coliseum; Clemson, South Carolina |
| January 17, 1979 | | Wake Forest | W 111–59 | 9–4 (2–1) | Littlejohn Coliseum; Clemson, South Carolina |
| January 19, 1979 | | No. 7 NC State | W 86–73 | 10–4 (3–1) | Littlejohn Coliseum; Clemson, South Carolina |
| January 20, 1979 | | at Virginia | W 62–59 | 11–4 (4–1) | University Hall; Charlottesville, Virginia |
| January 23, 1979* | No. 20 | at College of Charleston | L 63–72 | 11–5 (4–1) | Charleston, South Carolina |
| January 27, 1979 | No. 20 | North Carolina | W 91–63 | 12–5 (5–1) | Littlejohn Coliseum; Clemson, South Carolina |
| January 30, 1979* | | South Carolina State | L 60–69 | 12–6 (5–1) | Littlejohn Coliseum; Clemson, South Carolina |
| February 1, 1979* | | Winthrop | W 84–68 | 13–6 (5–1) | Littlejohn Coliseum; Clemson, South Carolina |
| February 3, 1979* | | South Carolina rivalry | W 70–63 | 14–6 (5–1) | Littlejohn Coliseum; Clemson, South Carolina |
| February 5, 1979 | | at Duke | W 94–58 | 15–6 (6–1) | Cameron Indoor Stadium; Durham, North Carolina |
| February 8, 1979* | | vs. Duke; ACC Tournament | W 81–56 | 16–6 (6–1) | Reynolds Coliseum; Raleigh, North Carolina |
| February 9, 1979* | | at No. 5 NC State; ACC Tournament | L 65–94 | 16–7 (6–1) | Reynolds Coliseum; Raleigh, North Carolina |
| February 14, 1979* | | Erskine | W 71–65 | 17–7 (6–1) | Littlejohn Coliseum; Clemson, South Carolina |
| February 16, 1979* | | at UAB | W 84–72 | 18–7 (6–1) | Birmingham–Jefferson Civic Center; Birmingham, Alabama |
| February 21, 1979* | | College of Charleston | W 72–69 | 19–7 (6–1) | Littlejohn Coliseum; Clemson, South Carolina |
| February 24, 1979* | | Claflin | W 112–53 | 20–7 (6–1) | Littlejohn Coliseum; Clemson, South Carolina |
| February 27, 1979 | | at No. 9 NC State | L 67–82 | 21–8 (6–2) | Reynolds Coliseum; Raleigh, North Carolina |
| March 1, 1979* | | at No. 18 South Carolina; SCAIAW Tournament, rivalry | L 74–75 | 20–9 (6–2) | Spartanburg, South Carolina |
| March 8, 1979* | | at No. 8 Tennessee; AIAW Region II Tournament | L 61–89 | 20–10 (6–2) | Stokely Athletic Center; Knoxville, Tennessee |
*Non-conference game. ^{#}Rankings from AP Poll. (#) Tournament seedings in parentheses.
