= 1994–95 Clemson Tigers women's basketball team =

Women's college basketball season

1994–95 Clemson Tigers women's basketball

NWIT, Fifth Place
- Conference: Atlantic Coast Conference
- Record: 21–11 (9–7 ACC)
- Head coach: Jim Davis (8th season)
- Home arena: Littlejohn Coliseum

The 1994–95 Clemson Tigers women's basketball team represented Clemson University during the 1994–95 NCAA Division I women's basketball season. The Tigers were led by eighth year head coach Jim Davis. The Tigers, members of the Atlantic Coast Conference, played their home games at Littlejohn Coliseum.

== Schedule ==
Date time, TV	Rank^{#}	Opponent^{#}	Result	Record	Site city, state
November 27, 1994*		vs. No. 21 Western Kentucky	L 86–94	0–1	Murphy Center; Murfreesboro, Tennessee
November 30, 1994*		Western Carolina	W 85–35	1–1	Littlejohn Coliseum; Clemson, South Carolina
December 3, 1994*		Furman	W 70–65	2–1	Littlejohn Coliseum; Clemson, South Carolina
December 5, 1994*		Coastal Carolina	W 84–37	3–1	Littlejohn Coliseum; Clemson, South Carolina
December 8, 1994*		at South Carolina rivalry	L 73–79	3–2	Carolina Coliseum; Columbia, South Carolina
December 10, 1994*		Charleston Southern	W 77–50	4–2	Littlejohn Coliseum; Clemson, South Carolina
December 17, 1994*		East Carolina	W 99–59	5–2	Littlejohn Coliseum; Clemson, South Carolina
December 19, 1994*		vs. Army; Northern Lights Invitational	W 82–56	6–2	Seawolf Sports Complex; Anchorage, Alaska
December 20, 1994*		vs. Providence; Northern Lights Invitational	W 88–79	7–2	Seawolf Sports Complex; Anchorage, Alaska
December 21, 1994*		vs. UCLA; Northern Lights Invitational	W 79–62	8–2	Seawolf Sports Complex; Anchorage, Alaska
December 29, 1994*		South Carolina State	W 102–42	9–2	Littlejohn Coliseum; Clemson, South Carolina
January 1, 1995		No. 11 Virginia	L 67–76	9–3 (0–1)	Littlejohn Coliseum; Clemson, South Carolina
January 5, 1995*		at College of Charleston	W 81–27	10–3 (0–1)	John Kresse Arena; Charleston, South Carolina
January 8, 1995		Florida State	W 72–68	11–3 (1–1)	Littlejohn Coliseum; Clemson, South Carolina
January 11, 1995		at Maryland	W 66–57	12–3 (2–1)	Cole Field House; College Park, Maryland
January 14, 1995		No. 4 North Carolina	L 73–77	12–4 (2–2)	Littlejohn Coliseum; Clemson, South Carolina
January 19, 1995		at Wake Forest	W 67–59	13–4 (3–2)	LJVM Coliseum; Winston-Salem, North Carolina
January 21, 1995		at NC State	L 66–72	13–5 (3–3)	Reynolds Coliseum; Raleigh, North Carolina
January 26, 1995		Georgia Tech	W 68–56	14–5 (4–3)	Littlejohn Coliseum; Clemson, South Carolina
January 28, 1995		at No. 12 Virginia	W 78–55	14–6 (4–4)	University Hall; Charlottesville, Virginia
February 1, 1995		No. 14 Duke	W 78–64	15–6 (5–4)	Littlejohn Coliseum; Clemson, South Carolina
February 6, 1995		at Florida State	W 67–64	16–6 (6–4)	Tallahassee–Leon County Civic Center; Tallahassee, Florida
February 11, 1995		Maryland	W 74–56	17–6 (7–4)	Littlejohn Coliseum; Clemson, South Carolina
February 15, 1995		at No. 9 North Carolina	L 69–82	17–7 (7–5)	Carmichael Arena; Chapel Hill, North Carolina
February 18, 1995		Wake Forest	W 72–57	18–7 (8–5)	Littlejohn Coliseum; Clemson, South Carolina
February 20, 1995		at No. 19 Duke	W 88–82	19–7 (9–5)	Cameron Indoor Stadium; Durham, North Carolina
February 23, 1995		NC State	L 55–68	19–8 (9–6)	Littlejohn Coliseum; Clemson, South Carolina
February 25, 1995		at Georgia Tech	L 60–68	19–9 (9–7)	Alexander Memorial Coliseum; Atlanta, Georgia
ACC Tournament
March 3, 1995*		vs. No. 22 Duke; ACC Tournament quarterfinal	L 71–78	19–10 (9–7)	Winthrop Coliseum; Rock Hill, South Carolina
NWIT
March 23, 1995*		vs. Northwestern State; NWIT quarterfinal	L 64–80	19–11 (9–7)	Amarillo Civic Center; Amarillo, Texas
March 24, 1995*		vs. Pacific; NWIT consolation round	W 80–75	20–11 (9–7)	Amarillo Civic Center; Amarillo, Texas
March 25, 1995*		vs. East Tennessee St. NWIT fifth place game	W 107–66	21–11 (9–7)	Amarillo Civic Center; Amarillo, Texas
*Non-conference game. ^{#}Rankings from AP Poll. (#) Tournament seedings in parentheses.
