= 1979–80 Clemson Tigers women's basketball team =

Women's college basketball season

1979–80 Clemson Tigers women's basketball
- Conference: Atlantic Coast Conference
- Record: 24–12 (6–3 ACC)
- Head coach: Annie Tribble (4th season)
- Home arena: Littlejohn Coliseum

The 1979–80 Clemson Tigers women's basketball team represented Clemson University during the 1979–80 women's college basketball season. The Tigers were led by fourth year head coach Annie Tribble. The Tigers, members of the Atlantic Coast Conference, played their home games at Littlejohn Coliseum.

== Schedule ==
Date time, TV	Rank^{#}	Opponent^{#}	Result	Record	Site city, state
November 23, 1979*		vs. Valdosta State; Tennessee Tech Invitational	W 81–39	1–0	Eblen Center; Cookeville, Tennessee
November 24, 1979*		at No. 13 Tennessee Tech; Tennessee Tech Invitational	L 77–94	1–1	Eblen Center; Cookeville, Tennessee
November 28, 1979*		at Georgia	W 83–81	2–1	Stegeman Coliseum; Athens, Georgia
November 30, 1979*		at No. 1 Old Dominion	L 58–112	2–2	Old Dominion University Fieldhouse; Norfolk, Virginia
December 1, 1979		at Wake Forest	W 104–58	3–2 (1–0)	Winston-Salem, North Carolina
December 5, 1979*		No. 13 South Carolina; Rivalry	W 75–73	4–2 (1–0)	Littlejohn Coliseum; Clemson, South Carolina
December 8, 1979*		Berry	W 96–67	5–2 (1–0)	Littlejohn Coliseum; Clemson, South Carolina
December 15, 1979*		Louisville	W 91–83	6–2 (1–0)	Littlejohn Coliseum; Clemson, South Carolina
December 17, 1979*		Georgia Southern	W 94–76	7–2 (1–0)	Littlejohn Coliseum; Clemson, South Carolina
December 20, 1979*		vs. Indiana; UNC Christmas Classic	W 77–58	8–2 (1–0)	Carmichael Arena; Chapel Hill, North Carolina
December 21, 1979*		vs. East Carolina; UNC Christmas Classic	W 83–78	9–2 (1–0)	Carmichael Arena; Chapel Hill, North Carolina
December 22, 1979		at North Carolina; UNC Christmas Classic	W 80–77	10–2 (2–0)	Carmichael Arena; Chapel Hill, North Carolina
January 5, 1980*		at East Tennessee State	W 84–76	11–2 (2–0)	Johnson City, Tennessee
January 7, 1980		at North Carolina	W 76–75	12–2 (3–0)	Carmichael Arena; Chapel Hill, North Carolina
January 9, 1980	No. 18	Duke	W 111–56	13–2 (4–0)	Littlejohn Coliseum; Clemson, South Carolina
January 11, 1980*	No. 18	James Madison; Clemson Lady Tiger Invitational	W 90–68	14–2 (4–0)	Littlejohn Coliseum; Clemson, South Carolina
January 12, 1980*	No. 18	Mississippi University for Women; Clemson Lady Tiger Invitational	W 94–74	15–2 (4–0)	Littlejohn Coliseum; Clemson, South Carolina
January 16, 1980	No. 16	at No. 15 Maryland	L 69–85	15–3 (4–1)	Cole Field House; College Park, Maryland
January 19, 1980	No. 16	Virginia	W 88–71	16–3 (5–1)	Littlejohn Coliseum; Clemson, South Carolina
January 23, 1980*	No. 16	No. 18 Mercer	W 88–85	17–3 (5–1)	Littlejohn Coliseum; Clemson, South Carolina
January 26, 1980*	No. 16	at South Carolina State	W 92–89	18–3 (5–1)	SHM Memorial Center; Orangeburg, South Carolina
January 28, 1980	No. 16	at No. 10 NC State	L 65–87	18–4 (5–2)	Reynolds Coliseum; Raleigh, North Carolina
January 31, 1980	No. 16	Georgia Tech	W 103–67	19–4 (6–2)	Littlejohn Coliseum; Clemson, South Carolina
February 2, 1980*	No. 16	No. 7 South Carolina; Rivalry	L 72–88	19–5 (6–2)	Carolina Coliseum; Columbia, South Carolina
February 5, 1980*	No. 16	Francis Marion	W 71–70	20–5 (6–2)	Littlejohn Coliseum; Clemson, South Carolina
February 8, 1980*	No. 16	vs. Virginia; ACC Tournament Quarterfinal	W 78–76	21–5 (6–2)	Cole Field House; College Park, Maryland
February 9, 1980*	No. 16	vs. No. 14 Maryland; ACC Tournament Semifinal	L 61–92	21–6 (6–2)	Cole Field House; College Park, Maryland
February 12, 1980*	No. 16	Carson–Newman	W 95–83	22–6 (6–2)	Littlejohn Coliseum; Clemson, South Carolina
February 16, 1980	No. 16	No. 9 NC State	L 72–74	22–7 (6–3)	Littlejohn Coliseum; Clemson, South Carolina
February 18, 1980*	No. 16	at No. 4 Tennessee	L 72–89	22–8 (6–3)	Stokely Athletic Center; Knoxville, Tennessee
February 23, 1980*	No. 16	College of Charleston	W 77–69	23–8 (6–3)	Littlejohn Coliseum; Clemson, South Carolina
March 1, 1980*	No. 16	vs. No. 7 South Carolina; SCAIAW Tournament, Rivalry	L 55–89	23–9 (6–3)	Florence, South Carolina
March 5, 1980*	No. 16	at No. 3 Tennessee; AIAW Region II Tournament	L 79–95	23–10 (6–3)	Stokely Athletic Center; Knoxville, Tennessee
March 20, 1980*		at Drake; National Women's Invitational Tournament	L 85–86	23–11 (6–3)	Amarillo Civic Center; Amarillo, Texas
March 21, 1980*		at Mississippi College; National Women's Invitational Tournament	L 85–87	23–12 (6–3)	Amarillo Civic Center; Amarillo, Texas
March 22, 1980*		at Wayland Baptist; National Women's Invitational Tournament	W 71–70	24–12 (6–3)	Amarillo Civic Center; Amarillo, Texas
*Non-conference game. ^{#}Rankings from AP Poll. (#) Tournament seedings in parentheses.
