= 1992–93 Clemson Tigers women's basketball team =

Women's college basketball season

1992–93 Clemson Tigers women's basketball

NCAA Tournament, Second Round
- Conference: Atlantic Coast Conference
- Record: 19–11 (8–8 ACC)
- Head coach: Jim Davis (6th season)
- Home arena: Littlejohn Coliseum

The 1992–93 Clemson Tigers women's basketball team represented Clemson University during the 1992–93 NCAA Division I women's basketball season. The Tigers were led by sixth year head coach Jim Davis. The Tigers, members of the Atlantic Coast Conference, played their home games at Littlejohn Coliseum.

== Schedule ==
Date time, TV	Rank^{#}	Opponent^{#}	Result	Record	Site city, state
December 2, 1992*		at Furman	W 72–58	1–0	Greenville Memorial Auditorium; Greenville, South Carolina
December 5, 1992*		South Carolina State	W 87–60	2–0	Littlejohn Coliseum; Clemson, South Carolina
December 16, 1992		at Georgia Tech	L 68–86	2–1 (0–1)	Alexander Memorial Coliseum; Atlanta, Georgia
December 18, 1992*		vs. Eastern Illinois; Alabama Classic	W 94–58	3–1 (0–1)	Coleman Coliseum; Tuscaloosa, Alabama
December 19, 1992*		at Alabama; Alabama Classic	W 79–68	4–1 (0–1)	Coleman Coliseum; Tuscaloosa, Alabama
December 27, 1992*		vs. No. 11 Texas; Rutgers/Bell Atlantic Tournament	W 78–75	5–1 (0–1)	Louis Brown Athletic Center; Piscataway, New Jersey
December 29, 1992*	No. 24	at Rutgers; Rutgers/Bell Atlantic Tournament	W 68–67	6–1 (0–1)	Louis Brown Athletic Center; Piscataway, New Jersey
January 3, 1993	No. 24	NC State	W 89–66	7–1 (1–1)	Littlejohn Coliseum; Clemson, South Carolina
January 6, 1993	No. 19	No. 3 Maryland	L 60–64	7–2 (1–2)	Littlejohn Coliseum; Clemson, South Carolina
January 13, 1993	No. 17	No. 8 Virginia	W 61–60 ^{OT}	8–2 (2–2)	Littlejohn Coliseum; Clemson, South Carolina
January 16, 1993	No. 17	No. 21 North Carolina	L 56–59	8–3 (2–3)	Littlejohn Coliseum; Clemson, South Carolina
January 18, 1993	No. 17	at Wake Forest	W 71–51	9–3 (3–3)	LJVM Coliseum; Winston-Salem, North Carolina
January 20, 1993*	No. 18	Alabama State	W 92–35	10–3 (3–3)	Littlejohn Coliseum; Clemson, South Carolina
January 24, 1993	No. 18	at NC State	L 71–79	10–4 (3–4)	Reynolds Coliseum; Raleigh, North Carolina
January 26, 1993	No. 19	Georgia Tech	W 85–80	11–4 (4–4)	Littlejohn Coliseum; Clemson, South Carolina
January 28, 1993*	No. 19	Chattanooga	W 74–60	12–4 (4–4)	Littlejohn Coliseum; Clemson, South Carolina
January 31, 1993	No. 19	Duke	W 88–63	13–4 (5–4)	Littlejohn Coliseum; Clemson, South Carolina
February 3, 1993*	No. 19	at South Carolina rivalry	L 54–55	13–5 (5–4)	Carolina Coliseum; Columbia, South Carolina
February 6, 1993	No. 19	at Florida State	W 84–69	14–5 (6–4)	Tallahassee–Leon County Civic Center; Tallahassee, Florida
February 10, 1993	No. 21	Wake Forest	W 68–58	15–5 (7–4)	Littlejohn Coliseum; Clemson, South Carolina
February 15, 1993	No. 21	at Duke	L 65–67	15–6 (7–5)	Cameron Indoor Stadium; Durham, North Carolina
February 18, 1993	No. 20	at No. 12 Maryland	L 73–81	15–7 (7–6)	Cole Field House; College Park, Maryland
February 20, 1993	No. 20	at No. 11 Virginia	L 70–87	15–8 (7–7)	University Hall; Charlottesville, Virginia
February 24, 1993	No. 24	Florida State	W 70–63	16–8 (8–7)	Littlejohn Coliseum; Clemson, South Carolina
February 27, 1993	No. 24	at No. 18 North Carolina	L 63–70	16–9 (8–8)	Carmichael Arena; Chapel Hill, North Carolina
March 1, 1993*		UNC Greensboro	W 75–66	17–9 (8–8)	Littlejohn Coliseum; Clemson, South Carolina
ACC Tournament
March 6, 1993*		vs. Georgia Tech; ACC Tournament quarterfinal	W 87–66	18–9 (8–8)	Winthrop Coliseum; Rock Hill, South Carolina
March 7, 1993*		vs. No. 10 Virginia; ACC Tournament semifinal	L 71–79 ^{OT}	18–10 (8–8)	Winthrop Coliseum; Rock Hill, South Carolina
NCAA Tournament
March 17, 1993*		Xavier; NCAA Tournament first round	W 70–64	19–10 (8–8)	Littlejohn Coliseum; Clemson, South Carolina
March 21, 1993*		at No. 12 Stephen F. Austin; NCAA Tournament second round	L 78–89	19–11 (8–8)	William R. Johnson Coliseum; Nacogdoches, Texas
*Non-conference game. ^{#}Rankings from AP Poll. (#) Tournament seedings in parentheses.
