= 1980–81 Clemson Tigers women's basketball team =

Women's college basketball season

1980–81 Clemson Tigers women's basketball

ACC Regular Season Champion
- Conference: Atlantic Coast Conference

Ranking
- AP: No. 20
- Record: 23–8 (6–1 ACC)
- Head coach: Annie Tribble (5th season)
- Home arena: Littlejohn Coliseum

The 1980–81 Clemson Tigers women's basketball team represented Clemson University during the 1980–81 women's college basketball season. The Tigers were led by fifth year head coach Annie Tribble. The Tigers, members of the Atlantic Coast Conference, played their home games at Littlejohn Coliseum.

== Schedule ==
Date time, TV	Rank^{#}	Opponent^{#}	Result	Record	Site city, state
December 1, 1980*	No. 19	at Carson–Newman	W 66–57	1–0	Holt Fieldhouse; Jefferson City, Tennessee
December 3, 1980	No. 19	North Carolina	W 85–70	2–0 (1–0)	Littlejohn Coliseum; Clemson, South Carolina
December 6, 1980*	No. 19	at No. 6 South Carolina rivalry	W 86–67	3–0 (1–0)	Carolina Coliseum; Columbia, South Carolina
December 13, 1980	No. 19	No. 16 Maryland	W 64–61	4–0 (2–0)	Littlejohn Coliseum; Clemson, South Carolina
December 16, 1980*	No. 16	Tennessee Tech	W 92–83	5–0 (2–0)	Littlejohn Coliseum; Clemson, South Carolina
December 18, 1980*	No. 16	vs. Middle Tennessee; Mississippi University for Women Invitational	W 66–63	6–0 (2–0)	Pohl Gymnasium; Columbus, Mississippi
December 19, 1980*	No. 16	vs. Mercer; Mississippi University for Women Invitational	L 83–85	6–1 (2–0)	Pohl Gymnasium; Columbus, Mississippi
December 20, 1980*	No. 16	vs. Florida State; Mississippi University for Women Invitational	W 78–59	7–1 (2–0)	Pohl Gymnasium; Columbus, Mississippi
January 2, 1981*	No. 18	vs. Fresno State; University of the Pacific Classic	W 76–60	8–1 (2–0)	Alex G. Spanos Center; Stockton, California
January 3, 1981*	No. 18	at Pacific; University of the Pacific Classic	L 70–78	8–2 (2–0)	Alex G. Spanos Center; Stockton, California
January 4, 1981*	No. 18	at California	L 78–83	8–3 (2–0)	Haas Pavilion; Berkeley, California
January 7, 1981		at Georgia Tech	W 75–61	9–3 (3–0)	Alexander Memorial Coliseum; Atlanta, Georgia
January 9, 1981*		Appalachian State; Clemson Lady Tiger Invitational	W 95–53	10–3 (3–0)	Littlejohn Coliseum; Clemson, South Carolina
January 10, 1981*		Alabama; Clemson Lady Tiger Invitational	W 79–72	11–3 (3–0)	Littlejohn Coliseum; Clemson, South Carolina
January 12, 1981		at No. 20 Virginia	L 67–77	11–4 (3–1)	University Hall; Charlottesville, Virginia
January 14, 1981		No. 10 NC State	W 73–70	12–4 (4–1)	Littlejohn Coliseum; Clemson, South Carolina
January 17, 1981*		Auburn	W 68–59	13–4 (4–1)	Littlejohn Coliseum; Clemson, South Carolina
January 19, 1981*		East Tennessee State	W 98–71	14–4 (4–1)	Littlejohn Coliseum; Clemson, South Carolina
January 21, 1981*		No. 7 Tennessee	W 72–64	15–4 (4–1)	Littlejohn Coliseum; Clemson, South Carolina
January 28, 1981	No. 20	Wake Forest	W 93–74	16–4 (5–1)	Littlejohn Coliseum; Clemson, South Carolina
January 31, 1981*	No. 20	at Louisville	W 78–77	17–4 (5–1)	Freedom Hall; Louisville, Kentucky
February 2, 1981	No. 20	at Duke	W 67–54	18–4 (6–1)	Cameron Indoor Stadium; Durham, North Carolina
February 7, 1981*		No. 13 South Carolina rivalry	W 78–70	19–4 (6–1)	Littlejohn Coliseum; Clemson, South Carolina
February 10, 1981*	No. 19	No. 2 Old Dominion	W 73–64	20–4 (6–1)	Littlejohn Coliseum; Clemson, South Carolina
February 12, 1981*	No. 19	Wake Forest; ACC Tournament quarterfinal	W 90–58	21–4 (6–1)	Littlejohn Coliseum; Clemson, South Carolina
February 13, 1981*	No. 19	No. 13 NC State; ACC Tournament semifinal	L 68–83	21–5 (6–1)	Littlejohn Coliseum; Clemson, South Carolina
February 18, 1981*	No. 16	Francis Marion	W 77–63	22–5 (6–1)	Littlejohn Coliseum; Clemson, South Carolina
February 21, 1981*	No. 16	at Mercer	L 78–79 ^{OT}	22–6 (6–1)	Macon Coliseum; Macon, Georgia
February 28, 1981*	No. 19	District of Columbia	W 72–67	23–6 (6–1)	Littlejohn Coliseum; Clemson, South Carolina
March 10, 1981*	No. 16	South Carolina; AIAW Region II Tournament, rivalry	L 64–81	23–7 (6–1)	Littlejohn Coliseum; Clemson, South Carolina
March 18, 1981*	No. 20	at No. 8 Rutgers; AIAW National Tournament second round	L 76–99	23–8 (6–1)	Rutgers Athletic Center; Piscataway, New Jersey
*Non-conference game. ^{#}Rankings from AP Poll. (#) Tournament seedings in parentheses.
