= 1983–84 Clemson Tigers women's basketball team =

Women's college basketball season

1983–84 Clemson Tigers women's basketball

NWIT, third place
- Conference: Atlantic Coast Conference
- Record: 21–10 (9–5 ACC)
- Head coach: Annie Tribble (8th season)
- Home arena: Littlejohn Coliseum

The 1983–84 Clemson Tigers women's basketball team represented Clemson University during the 1983–84 NCAA Division I women's basketball season. The Tigers were led by eighth year head coach Annie Tribble. The Tigers, members of the Atlantic Coast Conference, played their home games at Littlejohn Coliseum.

== Schedule ==
Date time, TV	Rank^{#}	Opponent^{#}	Result	Record	Site city, state
November 24, 1983*		vs. Oklahoma State; Wayland Baptist Classic	W 99–81	1–0	Hutcherson Center; Plainview, Texas
November 25, 1983*		at Wayland Baptist; Wayland Baptist Classic	W 67–57	2–0	Hutcherson Center; Plainview, Texas
November 26, 1983*		vs. Stephen F. Austin; Wayland Baptist Classic	W 95–75	3–0	Hutcherson Center; Plainview, Texas
November 30, 1983*	No. 19	UNC–Charlotte	W 87–67	4–0	Littlejohn Coliseum; Clemson, South Carolina
December 3, 1983*	No. 19	South Carolina rivalry	W 80–77	5–0	Littlejohn Coliseum; Clemson, South Carolina
December 6, 1983	No. 15	at Duke	W 78–72	6–0 (1–0)	Cameron Indoor Stadium; Durham, North Carolina
December 15, 1983*	No. 15	at Mississippi State	W 80–75 ^{OT}	7–0 (1–0)	Humphrey Coliseum; Starkville, Mississippi
December 17, 1983*	No. 15	at Jackson State	L 62–71	7–1 (1–0)	Williams Assembly Center; Jackson, Mississippi
December 29, 1983*	No. 17	at Ohio State; Ohio State Buckeye Classic	W 73–67	8–1 (1–0)	St. John Arena; Columbus, Ohio
December 30, 1983*	No. 17	vs. No. 3 Georgia; Ohio State Buckeye Classic	L 64–78	8–2 (1–0)	St. John Arena; Columbus, Ohio
January 5, 1984	No. 18	at Virginia	L 75–83	8–3 (1–1)	University Hall; Charlottesville, Virginia
January 7, 1984	No. 18	at No. 12 NC State	W 73–67	9–3 (2–1)	Reynolds Coliseum; Raleigh, North Carolina
January 11, 1984	No. 17	Georgia Tech	W 82–70	10–3 (3–1)	Littlejohn Coliseum; Clemson, South Carolina
January 14, 1984	No. 17	No. 13 Maryland	W 70–63	11–3 (4–1)	Littlejohn Coliseum; Clemson, South Carolina
January 17, 1984	No. 14	Duke	W 79–73	12–3 (5–1)	Littlejohn Coliseum; Clemson, South Carolina
January 21, 1984	No. 14	No. 19 Virginia	L 76–77	12–4 (5–2)	Littlejohn Coliseum; Clemson, South Carolina
January 23, 1984*	No. 17	Pittsburgh	W 94–72	13–4 (5–2)	Littlejohn Coliseum; Clemson, South Carolina
January 25, 1984	No. 17	at Georgia Tech	W 79–72	14–4 (6–2)	Alexander Memorial Coliseum; Atlanta, Georgia
January 28, 1984	No. 17	Wake Forest	W 100–58	15–4 (7–2)	Littlejohn Coliseum; Clemson, South Carolina
January 30, 1984	No. 14	at No. 15 North Carolina	L 61–69	15–5 (7–3)	Carmichael Arena; Chapel Hill, North Carolina
February 4, 1984	No. 14	No. 18 NC State	L 104–105 ^{2OT}	15–6 (7–4)	Littlejohn Coliseum; Clemson, South Carolina
February 8, 1984*	No. 19	Carson–Newman	W 70–51	16–6 (7–4)	Littlejohn Coliseum; Clemson, South Carolina
February 11, 1984*	No. 19	at South Carolina rivalry	W 81–73	17–6 (7–4)	Carolina Coliseum; Columbia, South Carolina
February 13, 1984*	No. 17	at Chattanooga	L 81–88	17–7 (7–4)	UTC Arena; Chattanooga, Tennessee
February 18, 1984	No. 17	at Wake Forest	W 79–75	18–7 (8–4)	Winston-Salem War Memorial Coliseum; Winston-Salem, North Carolina
February 23, 1984		at No. 13 Maryland	L 74–80	18–8 (8–5)	Cole Field House; College Park, Maryland
February 26, 1984	No. 20	North Carolina	W 98–76	19–8 (9–5)	Littlejohn Coliseum; Clemson, South Carolina
ACC Tournament
March 2, 1984*	No. 20	vs. North Carolina	L 73–74	19–9 (9–5)	Civic Center; Fayetteville, North Carolina
National Women's Invitational Tournament
March 22, 1984*		vs. Illinois State; NWIT quarterfinal	W 81–61	20–9 (9–5)	Amarillo Civic Center; Amarillo, Texas
March 23, 1984*		vs. No. 20 Chattanooga; NWIT semifinal	L 66–70	20–10 (9–5)	Amarillo Civic Center; Amarillo, Texas
March 24, 1984*		vs. Western Kentucky; NWIT third place	W 110–106 ^{OT}	21–10 (9–5)	Amarillo Civic Center; Amarillo, Texas
*Non-conference game. ^{#}Rankings from AP Poll. (#) Tournament seedings in parentheses.
