= 1986–87 Clemson Tigers women's basketball team =

Women's college basketball season

1986–87 Clemson Tigers women's basketball
- Conference: Atlantic Coast Conference
- Record: 7–21 (3–11 ACC)
- Head coach: Annie Tribble (11th season)
- Home arena: Littlejohn Coliseum

The 1986–87 Clemson Tigers women's basketball team represented Clemson University during the 1986–87 NCAA Division I women's basketball season. The Tigers were led by head coach Annie Tribble in her eleventh and final season. The Tigers, members of the Atlantic Coast Conference, played their home games at Littlejohn Coliseum.

== Schedule ==
Date time, TV	Rank^{#}	Opponent^{#}	Result	Record	Site city, state
November 28, 1986*		vs. No. 4 Auburn; Minnesota Classic	L 50–91	0–1	Williams Arena; Minneapolis, Minnesota
November 29, 1986*		vs. Northern Illinois; Minnesota Classic	W 72–71	1–1	Williams Arena; Minneapolis, Minnesota
December 3, 1986		at Duke	L 72–78	1–2 (0–1)	Cameron Indoor Stadium; Durham, North Carolina
December 6, 1986*		South Carolina rivalry	L 65–74	1–3 (0–1)	Littlejohn Coliseum; Clemson, South Carolina
December 13, 1986*		Baptist	W 103–53	2–3 (0–1)	Littlejohn Coliseum; Clemson, South Carolina
December 15, 1986*		at Florida	L 66–67	2–4 (0–1)	Stephen C. O'Connell Center; Gainesville, Florida
December 17, 1986		No. 20 NC State	L 75–87	2–5 (0–2)	Littlejohn Coliseum; Clemson, South Carolina
December 20, 1986*		Alabama	L 79–85	2–6 (0–2)	Littlejohn Coliseum; Clemson, South Carolina
January 3, 1987		at No. 15 NC State	L 65–83	2–7 (0–3)	Reynolds Coliseum; Raleigh, North Carolina
January 6, 1987*		at UAB	L 69–75	2–8 (0–3)	BJCC Arena; Birmingham, Alabama
January 10, 1987		at Wake Forest	L 54–90	2–9 (0–4)	Winston-Salem War Memorial Coliseum; Winston-Salem, North Carolina
January 12, 1987		at No. 20 Maryland	L 69–92	2–10 (0–5)	Cole Field House; College Park, Maryland
January 15, 1987*		at No. 12 Georgia	L 62–65	2–11 (0–5)	Stegeman Coliseum; Athens, Georgia
January 17, 1987		North Carolina	L 79–98	2–12 (0–6)	Littlejohn Coliseum; Clemson, South Carolina
January 21, 1987		Georgia Tech	L 78–81	2–13 (0–7)	Littlejohn Coliseum; Clemson, South Carolina
January 24, 1987*		New Orleans	L 76–81	2–14 (0–7)	Littlejohn Coliseum; Clemson, South Carolina
January 29, 1987*		at S.C. State	W 72–55	3–14 (0–7)	SHM Memorial Center; Orangeburg, South Carolina
January 31, 1987		No. 6 Virginia	L 77–83	3–15 (0–8)	Littlejohn Coliseum; Clemson, South Carolina
February 2, 1987*		at East Tennessee State	W 91–60	4–15 (0–8)	Memorial Center; Johnson City, Tennessee
February 4, 1987		at North Carolina	L 70–72	4–16 (0–9)	Carmichael Arena; Chapel Hill, North Carolina
February 7, 1987		Maryland	W 82–80	5–16 (1–9)	Littlejohn Coliseum; Clemson, South Carolina
February 9, 1987		Duke	W 79–76	6–16 (2–9)	Littlejohn Coliseum; Clemson, South Carolina
February 11, 1987*		at South Carolina rivalry	L 54–57	6–17 (2–9)	Carolina Coliseum; Columbia, South Carolina
February 14, 1987		at No. 8 Virginia	L 66–82	6–18 (2–10)	University Hall; Charlottesville, Virginia
February 18, 1987*		South Alabama	L 86–95	6–19 (2–10)	Littlejohn Coliseum; Clemson, South Carolina
February 21, 1987		Wake Forest	W 95–82	7–19 (3–10)	Littlejohn Coliseum; Clemson, South Carolina
February 23, 1987		at Georgia Tech	L 66–82	7–20 (3–11)	Alexander Memorial Coliseum; Atlanta, Georgia
ACC Tournament
February 28, 1987*		vs. No. 16 NC State; ACC Tournament quarterfinal	L 58–79	7–21 (3–11)	Civic Center; Fayetteville, North Carolina
*Non-conference game. ^{#}Rankings from AP Poll. (#) Tournament seedings in parentheses.
