= 1984–85 Clemson Tigers women's basketball team =

Women's college basketball season

1984–85 Clemson Tigers women's basketball
- Conference: Atlantic Coast Conference
- Record: 18–9 (8–6 ACC)
- Head coach: Annie Tribble (9th season)
- Home arena: Littlejohn Coliseum

The 1984–85 Clemson Tigers women's basketball team represented Clemson University during the 1984–85 NCAA Division I women's basketball season. The Tigers were led by ninth year head coach Annie Tribble. The Tigers, members of the Atlantic Coast Conference, played their home games at Littlejohn Coliseum.

== Schedule ==
Date time, TV	Rank^{#}	Opponent^{#}	Result	Record	Site city, state
November 23, 1984*		vs. Wisconsin; Nebraska Invitational	W 87–54	1–0	Bob Devaney Sports Center; Lincoln, Nebraska
November 24, 1984*		at Nebraska; Nebraska Invitational	W 99–84	2–0	Bob Devaney Sports Center; Lincoln, Nebraska
December 5, 1984*		at South Carolina rivalry	W 70–62	3–0	Carolina Coliseum; Columbia, South Carolina
December 8, 1984*		Tennessee Tech	L 70–71	3–1	Littlejohn Coliseum; Clemson, South Carolina
December 16, 1984*		vs. Oregon State; Giusti Tournament	L 75–82	3–2	Viking Pavilion; Portland, Oregon
December 17, 1984*		vs. Wyoming; Giusti Tournament	W 95–74	4–2	Viking Pavilion; Portland, Oregon
December 18, 1984*		vs. Portland; Giusti Tournament	W 79–66	5–2	Viking Pavilion; Portland, Oregon
December 29, 1984*		Virginia Tech	W 101–90	6–2	Littlejohn Coliseum; Clemson, South Carolina
December 31, 1984		at Duke	L 76–84	6–3 (0–1)	Cameron Indoor Stadium; Durham, North Carolina
January 2, 1985		North Carolina	L 70–75	6–4 (0–2)	Littlejohn Coliseum; Clemson, South Carolina
January 5, 1985		NC State	L 74–79	6–5 (0–3)	Littlejohn Coliseum; Clemson, South Carolina
January 9, 1985		at Georgia Tech	W 84–81 ^{OT}	7–5 (1–3)	Alexander Memorial Coliseum; Atlanta, Georgia
January 12, 1985		Maryland	W 66–61	8–5 (2–3)	Littlejohn Coliseum; Clemson, South Carolina
January 14, 1985		Duke	L 70–76	8–6 (2–4)	Littlejohn Coliseum; Clemson, South Carolina
January 19, 1985		No. 15 Virginia	W 75–67	9–6 (3–4)	Littlejohn Coliseum; Clemson, South Carolina
January 24, 1985		at North Carolina	L 71–74	9–7 (3–5)	Carmichael Arena; Chapel Hill, North Carolina
January 30, 1985		Wake Forest	W 76–68	10–7 (4–5)	Littlejohn Coliseum; Clemson, South Carolina
February 2, 1985*		Georgia State	W 84–73	11–7 (4–5)	Littlejohn Coliseum; Clemson, South Carolina
February 6, 1985		at NC State	L 72–87	11–8 (4–6)	Reynolds Coliseum; Raleigh, North Carolina
February 9, 1985*		Mars Hill	W 100–63	12–8 (4–6)	Littlejohn Coliseum; Clemson, South Carolina
February 11, 1985		Georgia Tech	W 95–75	13–8 (5–6)	Littlejohn Coliseum; Clemson, South Carolina
February 15, 1985		at Wake Forest	W 71–63	14–8 (6–6)	Winston-Salem War Memorial Coliseum; Winston-Salem, North Carolina
February 17, 1985*		Western Carolina	W 91–62	15–8 (6–6)	Littlejohn Coliseum; Clemson, South Carolina
February 20, 1985		at No. 16 Virginia	W 66–63	16–8 (7–6)	University Hall; Charlottesville, Virginia
February 23, 1985		at Maryland	W 87–83	17–8 (8–6)	Cole Field House; College Park, Maryland
February 25, 1985*		South Carolina rivalry	W 83–61	18–8 (8–6)	Littlejohn Coliseum; Clemson, South Carolina
ACC Tournament
March 1, 1985*		vs. Duke; ACC Tournament quarterfinal	L 76–81	18–9 (8–6)	Civic Center; Fayetteville, North Carolina
*Non-conference game. ^{#}Rankings from AP Poll. (#) Tournament seedings in parentheses.
