= 1987–88 Clemson Tigers women's basketball team =

Women's college basketball season

1987–88 Clemson Tigers women's basketball
- Conference: Atlantic Coast Conference
- Record: 21–9 (8–6 ACC)
- Head coach: Jim Davis (1st season)
- Home arena: Littlejohn Coliseum

The 1987–88 Clemson Tigers women's basketball team represented Clemson University during the 1987–88 NCAA Division I women's basketball season. The Tigers were led by first year head coach Jim Davis. The Tigers, members of the Atlantic Coast Conference, played their home games at Littlejohn Coliseum.

== Schedule ==
Date time, TV	Rank^{#}	Opponent^{#}	Result	Record	Site city, state
November 27, 1987*		vs. Southern Mississippi; Georgia Southern Classic	W 78–64	1–0	Hanner Fieldhouse; Statesboro, Georgia
November 28, 1987*		at Georgia Southern; Georgia Southern Classic	W 64–52	2–0	Hanner Fieldhouse; Statesboro, Georgia
December 2, 1987*		South Carolina State	W 87–51	3–0	Littlejohn Coliseum; Clemson, South Carolina
December 5, 1987		NC State	W 76–72	4–0 (1–0)	Littlejohn Coliseum; Clemson, South Carolina
December 12, 1987*		UNC–Charlotte	W 81–64	5–0 (1–0)	Littlejohn Coliseum; Clemson, South Carolina
December 14, 1987*		at South Alabama	W 75–71	6–0 (1–0)	Jag Gym; Mobile, Alabama
December 16, 1987*		at New Orleans	L 55–59	6–1 (1–0)	Lakefront Arena; New Orleans, Louisiana
December 30, 1987*		Boston University	W 77–53	7–1 (1–0)	Littlejohn Coliseum; Clemson, South Carolina
January 4, 1988		at No. 9 Duke	L 61–68	7–2 (1–1)	Cameron Indoor Stadium; Durham, North Carolina
January 6, 1988		at NC State	W 72–66	8–2 (2–1)	Reynolds Coliseum; Raleigh, North Carolina
January 14, 1988		No. 14 Maryland	L 78–79 ^{OT}	8–3 (2–2)	Littlejohn Coliseum; Clemson, South Carolina
January 16, 1988		Wake Forest	L 64–70	8–4 (2–3)	Littlejohn Coliseum; Clemson, South Carolina
January 18, 1988*		Radford	W 92–58	9–4 (2–3)	Littlejohn Coliseum; Clemson, South Carolina
January 23, 1988		at North Carolina	W 73–50	10–4 (3–3)	Carmichael Arena; Chapel Hill, North Carolina
January 27, 1988		Georgia Tech	W 94–72	11–4 (4–3)	Littlejohn Coliseum; Clemson, South Carolina
January 30, 1988*		at South Carolina rivalry	W 62–60	12–4 (4–3)	Carolina Coliseum; Columbia, South Carolina
February 1, 1988		No. 17 Duke	W 78–65	13–4 (5–3)	Littlejohn Coliseum; Clemson, South Carolina
February 3, 1988		at Georgia Tech	W 90–74	14–4 (6–3)	Alexander Memorial Coliseum; Atlanta, Georgia
February 6, 1988		at No. 6 Virginia	L 64–67	14–5 (6–4)	University Hall; Charlottesville, Virginia
February 8, 1988		at No. 11 Maryland	L 67–84	14–6 (6–5)	Cole Field House; College Park, Maryland
February 10, 1988*		South Carolina rivalry	W 72–62	15–6 (6–5)	Littlejohn Coliseum; Clemson, South Carolina
February 13, 1988*		No. 13 Georgia	W 73–65	16–6 (6–5)	Littlejohn Coliseum; Clemson, South Carolina
February 15, 1988*		at UNC–Charlotte	W 77–44	17–6 (6–5)	Belk Gymnasium; Charlotte, North Carolina
February 17, 1988*		Georgia State	W 96–64	18–6 (6–5)	Littlejohn Coliseum; Clemson, South Carolina
February 20, 1988		No. 7 Virginia	W 85–77	19–6 (7–5)	Littlejohn Coliseum; Clemson, South Carolina
February 25, 1988	No. 20	at Wake Forest	L 78–83	19–7 (7–6)	Winston-Salem War Memorial Coliseum; Winston-Salem, North Carolina
February 27, 1988	No. 20	North Carolina	W 66–60	20–7 (8–6)	Littlejohn Coliseum; Clemson, South Carolina
ACC Tournament
March 5, 1988*		vs. Duke; ACC Tournament quarterfinal	W 81–65	21–7 (8–6)	Civic Center; Fayetteville, North Carolina
March 6, 1988*		vs. No. 9 Virginia; ACC Tournament semifinal	L 57–66	21–8 (8–6)	Civic Center; Fayetteville, North Carolina
NCAA Tournament
March 19, 1988*		at No. 14 James Madison; NCAA Tournament East Region second round	L 63–70	21–9 (8–6)	JMU Convocation Center; Harrisonburg, Virginia
*Non-conference game. ^{#}Rankings from AP Poll. (#) Tournament seedings in parentheses.
