= 2011–12 Clemson Tigers women's basketball team =

Women's college basketball season

2011–12 Clemson Tigers women's basketball
- Conference: Atlantic Coast Conference
- Record: 6–22 (2–14 ACC)
- Head coach: Itoro Coleman (2nd season)
- Home arena: Littlejohn Coliseum

The 2011–12 Clemson Tigers women's basketball team represented Clemson University during the 2011–12 NCAA Division I women's basketball season. The Tigers were led by second year head coach Itoro Coleman. The Tigers, members of the Atlantic Coast Conference, played their home games at Littlejohn Coliseum.

== Schedule ==
| Date time, TV | Rank^{#} | Opponent^{#} | Result | Record | Site city, state |
|---|---|---|---|---|---|
| November 11, 2011* | | Davidson | W 72–62 | 1–0 | Littlejohn Coliseum; Clemson, South Carolina |
| November 13, 2011* | | South Carolina State | W 83–38 | 2–0 | Littlejohn Coliseum; Clemson, South Carolina |
| November 17, 2011* | | South Carolina rivalry | L 48–65 | 2–1 | Littlejohn Coliseum; Clemson, South Carolina |
| November 21, 2011* | | at North Carolina A&T | L 66–76 | 2–2 | Corbett Sports Center; Greensboro, North Carolina |
| November 28, 2011* | | at Furman | W 68–67 | 3–2 | Timmons Arena; Greenville, South Carolina |
| December 1, 2011* | | Illinois; ACC–Big Ten Women's Challenge | L 50–61 | 3–3 | Littlejohn Coliseum; Clemson, South Carolina |
| December 4, 2011* | | Charleston Southern | L 77–82 | 3–4 | Littlejohn Coliseum; Clemson, South Carolina |
| December 9, 2011* | | at Oakland | L 51–63 | 3–5 | Athletics Center O'rena; Auburn Hills, Michigan |
| December 18, 2011* | | North Carolina Central | W 68–48 | 4–5 | Littlejohn Coliseum; Clemson, South Carolina |
| December 22, 2011* | | at Providence | L 63–73 | 4–6 | Alumni Hall; Providence, Rhode Island |
| December 30, 2011* | | at UAB | L 36–51 | 4–7 | Bartow Arena; Birmingham, Alabama |
| January 2, 2012 | | Virginia Tech | L 33–55 | 4–8 (0–1) | Littlejohn Coliseum; Clemson, South Carolina |
| January 5, 2012 | | at Florida State | L 47–59 | 4–9 (0–2) | Donald L. Tucker Civic Center; Tallahassee, Florida |
| January 8, 2012 | | Virginia | L 47–54 | 4–10 (0–3) | Littlejohn Coliseum; Clemson, South Carolina |
| January 12, 2012 | | at No. 21 North Carolina | W 52–47 | 5–10 (1–3) | Carmichael Arena; Chapel Hill, North Carolina |
| January 19, 2012 | | NC State | L 46–62 | 5–11 (1–4) | Littlejohn Coliseum; Clemson, South Carolina |
| January 22, 2012 | | at Wake Forest | L 65–94 | 5–12 (1–5) | LJVM Coliseum; Winston-Salem, North Carolina |
| January 27, 2012 | | No. 5 Duke | L 37–81 | 5–13 (1–6) | Littlejohn Coliseum; Clemson, South Carolina |
| January 29, 2012 | | No. 24 Georgia Tech | L 54–63 | 5–14 (1–7) | Littlejohn Coliseum; Clemson, South Carolina |
| February 3, 2012 | | at Virginia Tech | W 55–51 ^{OT} | 6–14 (2–7) | Cassell Coliseum; Blacksburg, Virginia |
| February 5, 2012 | | at No. 7 Miami (FL) | L 47–68 | 6–15 (2–8) | BankUnited Center; Miami, Florida |
| February 9, 2012 | | No. 8 Maryland | L 61–91 | 6–16 (2–9) | Littlejohn Coliseum; Clemson, South Carolina |
| February 12, 2012 | | at Virginia | L 36–68 | 6–17 (2–10) | John Paul Jones Arena; Charlottesville, Virginia |
| February 16, 2012 | | at Boston College | L 53–56 | 6–18 (2–11) | Conte Forum; Chestnut Hill, Massachusetts |
| February 19, 2012 | | Wake Forest | L 51–63 | 6–19 (2–12) | Littlejohn Coliseum; Clemson, South Carolina |
| February 23, 2012 | | at Florida State | L 52–74 | 6–20 (2–13) | Donald L. Tucker Civic Center; Tallahassee, Florida |
| February 26, 2012 | | at No. 17 Georgia Tech | L 50–62 | 6–21 (2–14) | Alexander Memorial Coliseum; Atlanta, Georgia |
ACC Tournament
| March 1, 2012* | | vs. North Carolina; ACC Tournament first round | L 51–90 | 6–22 (2–14) | Greensboro Coliseum; Greensboro, North Carolina |
*Non-conference game. ^{#}Rankings from AP Poll. (#) Tournament seedings in parentheses.
