= 2004–05 Clemson Tigers women's basketball team =

Women's college basketball season

2004–05 Clemson Tigers women's basketball
- Conference: Atlantic Coast Conference
- Record: 8–20 (2–12 ACC)
- Head coach: Jim Davis (18th season)
- Home arena: Littlejohn Coliseum

The 2004–05 Clemson Tigers women's basketball team represented Clemson University during the 2004–05 NCAA Division I women's basketball season. The Tigers were led by head coach Jim Davis in his eighteenth and final season. The Tigers, members of the Atlantic Coast Conference, played their home games at Littlejohn Coliseum.

== Schedule ==
Date time, TV	Rank^{#}	Opponent^{#}	Result	Record	Site city, state
November 19, 2004*		Western Carolina	W 62–55	1–0	Littlejohn Coliseum; Clemson, South Carolina
November 21, 2004*		Appalachian State	L 62–67	1–1	Littlejohn Coliseum; Clemson, South Carolina
November 24, 2004*		at UCLA	L 52–83	1–2	Pauley Pavilion; Los Angeles, California
November 26, 2004*		at San Diego	L 73–74	1–3	Jenny Craig Pavilion; San Diego, California
November 30, 2004*		Furman	L 59–76	1–4	Littlejohn Coliseum; Clemson, South Carolina
December 3, 2004*		at South Carolina rivalry	W 87–79 ^{OT}	2–4	Colonial Life Arena; Columbia, South Carolina
December 5, 2004*		Morehead State	W 72–48	3–4	Littlejohn Coliseum; Clemson, South Carolina
December 11, 2004*		Pittsburgh	W 51–38	4–4	Littlejohn Coliseum; Clemson, South Carolina
December 16, 2004*		at Wagner	W 80–50	5–4	Spiro Sports Center; Staten Island, New York
December 18, 2004*		at No. 22 Rutgers	L 51–66	5–5	Louis Brown Athletic Center; Piscataway, New Jersey
December 21, 2004*		vs. Mississippi	L 54–67	5–6	BancorpSouth Center; Tupelo, Mississippi
January 2, 2005		Georgetown	W 71–62	6–6	Littlejohn Coliseum; Clemson, South Carolina
January 9, 2005		NC State	W 78–65	7–6 (1–0)	Littlejohn Coliseum; Clemson, South Carolina
January 13, 2005		Florida State	L 57–68	7–7 (1–1)	Littlejohn Coliseum; Clemson, South Carolina
January 16, 2005		at Virginia	L 49–68	7–8 (1–2)	University Hall; Charlottesville, Virginia
January 20, 2005		No. 23 Virginia Tech	L 66–81	7–9 (1–3)	Littlejohn Coliseum; Clemson, South Carolina
January 23, 2005		at Wake Forest	L 71–86	7–10 (1–4)	LJVM Coliseum; Winston-Salem, North Carolina
January 26, 2005		at Georgia Tech	L 48–53	7–11 (1–5)	Alexander Memorial Coliseum; Atlanta, Georgia
January 31, 2005		Miami	L 69–83	7–12 (1–6)	Littlejohn Coliseum; Clemson, South Carolina
February 4, 2005		at No. 6 North Carolina	L 55–99	7–13 (1–7)	Carmichael Arena; Chapel Hill, North Carolina
February 6, 2005		No. 20 Maryland	L 82–87	7–14 (1–8)	Littlejohn Coliseum; Clemson, South Carolina
February 9, 2005		at No. 24 Florida State	L 61–82	7–15 (1–9)	Donald L. Tucker Civic Center; Tallahassee, Florida
February 13, 2005*		vs. No. 18 Georgia; Russell Athletic Shootout	L 60–88	7–16 (1–9)	Arena at Gwinnett Center; Duluth, Georgia
February 17, 2005		at No. 3 Duke	L 48–72	7–17 (1–10)	Cameron Indoor Stadium; Durham, North Carolina
February 21, 2005		Wake Forest	L 60–68	7–18 (1–11)	Littlejohn Coliseum; Clemson, South Carolina
February 24, 2005		Georgia Tech	W 58–49	8–18 (2–11)	Littlejohn Coliseum; Clemson, South Carolina
February 28, 2005		at No. 19 NC State	L 45–69	8–19 (2–12)	Reynolds Coliseum; Raleigh, North Carolina
ACC Tournament
March 4, 2005*		vs. No. 25 Maryland; ACC Tournament first round	L 55–66	8–20 (2–12)	Greensboro Coliseum; Greensboro, North Carolina
*Non-conference game. ^{#}Rankings from AP Poll. (#) Tournament seedings in parentheses.
