= 1985–86 Clemson Tigers women's basketball team =

Women's college basketball season

1985–86 Clemson Tigers women's basketball
- Conference: Atlantic Coast Conference
- Record: 12–16 (4–10 ACC)
- Head coach: Annie Tribble (10th season)
- Home arena: Littlejohn Coliseum

The 1985–86 Clemson Tigers women's basketball team represented Clemson University during the 1985–86 NCAA Division I women's basketball season. The Tigers were led by tenth year head coach Annie Tribble. The Tigers, members of the Atlantic Coast Conference, played their home games at Littlejohn Coliseum.

== Schedule ==
Date time, TV	Rank^{#}	Opponent^{#}	Result	Record	Site city, state
November 25, 1985*		No. 2 Georgia	L 68–87	0–1	Littlejohn Coliseum; Clemson, South Carolina
November 27, 1985*		at Virginia Tech	W 77–76	1–1	Cassell Coliseum; Blacksburg, Virginia
November 29, 1985*		vs. Middle Tennessee; Kentucky Invitational	L 88–90	1–2	Memorial Coliseum; Lexington, Kentucky
November 30, 1985*		vs. Cleveland State; Kentucky Invitational	W 104–72	2–2	Memorial Coliseum; Lexington, Kentucky
December 2, 1985*		Florida	W 69–65	3–2	Littlejohn Coliseum; Clemson, South Carolina
December 4, 1985*		Presbyterian	W 100–40	4–2	Littlejohn Coliseum; Clemson, South Carolina
December 7, 1985*		South Carolina rivalry	W 62–61	5–2	Littlejohn Coliseum; Clemson, South Carolina
December 14, 1985*		East Tennessee State	W 79–47	6–2	Littlejohn Coliseum; Clemson, South Carolina
December 16, 1985		at Georgia Tech	W 90–80	7–2 (1–0)	Alexander Memorial Coliseum; Atlanta, Georgia
December 18, 1985		at NC State	L 72–76	7–3 (1–1)	Reynolds Coliseum; Raleigh, North Carolina
December 21, 1985*		at Tennessee Tech	L 78–85	7–4 (1–1)	Eblen Center; Cookeville, Tennessee
January 4, 1986		No. 18 NC State	L 62–75	7–5 (1–2)	Littlejohn Coliseum; Clemson, South Carolina
January 11, 1986		No. 4 Virginia	L 89–96 ^{OT}	7–6 (1–3)	Littlejohn Coliseum; Clemson, South Carolina
January 13, 1986		No. 20 Duke	L 77–93	7–7 (1–4)	Littlejohn Coliseum; Clemson, South Carolina
January 15, 1986		Maryland	L 73–77	7–8 (1–5)	Littlejohn Coliseum; Clemson, South Carolina
January 18, 1986		Georgia Tech	W 84–73	8–8 (2–5)	Littlejohn Coliseum; Clemson, South Carolina
January 22, 1986		at No. 15 North Carolina	L 91–95	8–9 (2–6)	Carmichael Arena; Chapel Hill, North Carolina
January 25, 1986		Wake Forest	L 73–88	8–10 (2–7)	Littlejohn Coliseum; Clemson, South Carolina
February 1, 1986*		at Alabama	L 69–88	8–11 (2–7)	Coleman Coliseum; Tuscaloosa, Alabama
February 3, 1986*		at South Carolina rivalry	L 72–86	8–12 (2–7)	Carolina Coliseum; Columbia, South Carolina
February 8, 1986		at No. 17 Duke	L 76–80	8–13 (2–8)	Cameron Indoor Stadium; Durham, North Carolina
February 10, 1986		at Maryland	L 59–62	8–14 (2–9)	Cole Field House; College Park, Maryland
February 12, 1986*		UAB	W 79–75	9–14 (2–9)	Littlejohn Coliseum; Clemson, South Carolina
February 15, 1986		No. 13 North Carolina	W 80–65	10–14 (3–9)	Littlejohn Coliseum; Clemson, South Carolina
February 17, 1986		at Wake Forest	W 92–67	11–14 (4–9)	Winston-Salem War Memorial Coliseum; Winston-Salem, North Carolina
February 22, 1986		at No. 3 Virginia	L 79–90	11–15 (4–10)	University Hall; Charlottesville, Virginia
February 26, 1986*		South Carolina State	W 88–63	12–15 (4–10)	Littlejohn Coliseum; Clemson, South Carolina
ACC Tournament
March 1, 1986*		vs. No. 17 North Carolina; ACC Tournament quarterfinal	L 83–88	12–16 (4–10)	Civic Center; Fayetteville, North Carolina
*Non-conference game. ^{#}Rankings from AP Poll. (#) Tournament seedings in parentheses.
