= 2010–11 Clemson Tigers women's basketball team =

Women's college basketball season

2010–11 Clemson Tigers women's basketball
- Conference: Atlantic Coast Conference
- Record: 10–20 (3–11 ACC)
- Head coach: Itoro Coleman (1st season)
- Home arena: Littlejohn Coliseum

The 2010–11 Clemson Tigers women's basketball team represented Clemson University during the 2010–11 NCAA Division I women's basketball season. The Tigers were led by first year head coach Itoro Coleman. The Tigers, members of the Atlantic Coast Conference, played their home games at Littlejohn Coliseum.

== Schedule ==
Date time, TV	Rank^{#}	Opponent^{#}	Result	Record	Site city, state
November 12, 2010*		UNC Greensboro	W 71–55	1–0	Littlejohn Coliseum; Clemson, South Carolina
November 14, 2010*		Charleston Southern	W 85–52	2–0	Littlejohn Coliseum; Clemson, South Carolina
November 18, 2010*		at South Carolina rivalry	L 59–73	2–1	Colonial Life Arena; Columbia, South Carolina
November 21, 2010*		Kennesaw State	W 68–57	3–1	Littlejohn Coliseum; Clemson, South Carolina
November 23, 2010*		Furman	W 62–53	4–1	Littlejohn Coliseum; Clemson, South Carolina
November 28, 2010*		South Carolina State	W 66–44	5–1	Littlejohn Coliseum; Clemson, South Carolina
December 2, 2010*		Indiana; ACC–Big Ten Women's Challenge	L 51–65	5–2	Littlejohn Coliseum; Clemson, South Carolina
December 5, 2010*		Presbyterian	W 61–49	6–2	Littlejohn Coliseum; Clemson, South Carolina
December 12, 2010*		at Samford	L 48–58	6–3	Pete Hanna Center; Homewood, Alabama
December 15, 2010*		at UAB	L 64–67	6–4	Bartow Arena; Birmingham, Alabama
December 18, 2010*		Oakland	L 49–73	6–5	Littlejohn Coliseum; Clemson, South Carolina
December 20, 2010*		vs. No. 2 Baylor; Bahamas Sunsplash Shootout	L 40–82	6–6	Kendal Isaacs National Gymnasium; Nassau, Bahamas
December 22, 2010*		vs. No. 23 Syracuse; Bahamas Sunsplash Shootout	L 58–77	6–7	Kendal Isaacs National Gymnasium; Nassau, Bahamas
December 30, 2010*		at No. 18 Georgetown	L 54–75	6–8	McDonough Gymnasium; Washington, D. C.
January 3, 2011*		North Carolina A&T	W 77–71	7–8	Littlejohn Coliseum; Clemson, South Carolina
January 6, 2011		at NC State	W 76–74	8–8 (1–0)	Reynolds Coliseum; Raleigh, North Carolina
January 9, 2011		Georgia Tech	L 53–64	8–9 (1–1)	Littlejohn Coliseum; Clemson, South Carolina
January 14, 2011		at No. 22 Miami (FL)	L 48–77	8–10 (1–2)	BankUnited Center; Miami, Florida
January 16, 2011		No. 13 Maryland	L 59–80	8–11 (1–3)	Littlejohn Coliseum; Clemson, South Carolina
January 20, 2011		No. 16 Florida State	L 73–83	8–12 (1–4)	Littlejohn Coliseum; Clemson, South Carolina
January 23, 2011		at Wake Forest	W 77–73 ^{OT}	9–12 (2–4)	LJVM Coliseum; Winston-Salem, North Carolina
January 26, 2011		at No. 3 Duke	L 37–92	9–13 (2–5)	Cameron Indoor Stadium; Durham, North Carolina
January 30, 2011		Virginia	W 84–74	10–13 (3–5)	Littlejohn Coliseum; Clemson, South Carolina
February 6, 2011		at Boston College	L 49–78	10–14 (3–6)	Conte Forum; Chestnut Hill, Massachusetts
February 10, 2011		No. 10 North Carolina	L 47–60	10–15 (3–7)	Littlejohn Coliseum; Clemson, South Carolina
February 14, 2011		Virginia Tech	L 56–68	10–16 (3–8)	Littlejohn Coliseum; Clemson, South Carolina
February 17, 2011		at Georgia Tech	L 46–72	10–17 (3–9)	Alexander Memorial Coliseum; Atlanta, Georgia
February 24, 2011		Wake Forest	L 64–86	10–18 (3–10)	Littlejohn Coliseum; Clemson, South Carolina
February 27, 2011		at No. 12 Florida State	L 50–67	10–19 (3–11)	Donald L. Tucker Civic Center; Tallahassee, Florida
ACC Tournament
March 3, 2011*		vs. North Carolina; ACC Tournament first round	L 64–78	10–20 (3–11)	Greensboro Coliseum; Greensboro, North Carolina
*Non-conference game. ^{#}Rankings from AP Poll. (#) Tournament seedings in parentheses.
