= Mary King (basketball) =

Mary Kennerty King
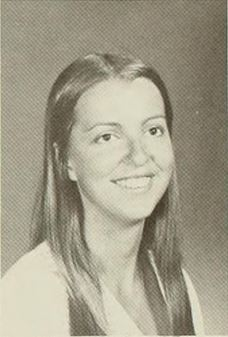
- King in 1973

Biographical details
- Education: Clemson (BA 1973)

Coaching career (HC unless noted)
- 1973–1974: Russell HS (GA)
- 1975–1976: Clemson

Head coaching record
- Overall: 14–11 (.560)

Mary Cecile King (née Kennerty) is a former college basketball and tennis coach. A native of Charleston, South Carolina, she attended Clemson University, graduating in 1973 with a degree in secondary education. She taught history and coached girls' basketball at Russell High School in East Point, Georgia, in 1973–74, before returning to Clemson for graduate school. King was named head coach of the women's basketball and women's tennis teams in 1975 for both teams' inaugural seasons. After a 14–11 season in basketball, she handed the team to coach Annie Tribble for 1976–77, but continued coaching the tennis team until 1982.
