= Carolina Fieldhouse =

Arena in Columbia, South Carolina

Coordinates: 33.9952°N 81.0296°W

Carolina Fieldhouse was a 3,200 seat multi-purpose arena in Columbia, South Carolina. It opened in 1927. It was home to the University of South Carolina Gamecocks basketball teams until it was destroyed by a fire in 1968. Its games were then played at the Carolina Coliseum.
