= Barbara Kennedy =

American basketball player (1960–2018)

Personal information
- Born: January 19, 1960 San Diego, California, U.S.
- Died: July 23, 2018 (aged 58)

Career information
- College: Clemson (1978–1982)

Career highlights
- 2× First-team All-American (1981, 1982); 3× First-team All-ACC (1980–1982); Second-team All-ACC (1979); 2× ACC tournament MVP (1981, 1982); All-ACC Rookie Team (1979); NCAA season scoring leader (1982); No. 42 retired by Clemson Tigers; ACC 50th Anniversary Team
- Women's Basketball Hall of Fame

Barbara Elaine Kennedy-Dixon (January 19, 1960 – July 23, 2018) was an American basketball player. She played college basketball at Clemson. In 1981–82, her senior season with the Tigers, the National Collegiate Athletic Association (NCAA) began to officially sponsor women's basketball. She finished that season becoming the first player to lead Division I women's basketball in scoring.

== Early life ==
Kennedy-Dixon was born on January 19, 1960, in San Diego, California. She grew up in Rome, Georgia, where she attended East Rome High School.

== College career ==
Kennedy-Dixon played for the Clemson Tigers from 1978 to 1982. As a freshman, Kennedy-Dixon was named second-team All-Atlantic Coast Conference (ACC) and selected to the All-ACC Rookie Team. Kennedy-Dixon would be a first-team All-ACC selection in each of her final three seasons at Clemson. She was also named a first-team All-American by the American Women's Sports Foundation in 1981 and Kodak in 1982.

In 1981–82, her senior season, the NCAA began to officially sponsor women's basketball. In her senior day game against North Carolina, she scored 42 points. During this time period of college basketball, universities often scheduled double-headers featuring both their women's and men's basketball programs. Kennedy-Dixon returned to the court for the men's game following her senior day game to sing the national anthem. On March 12, 1982, Kennedy-Dixon scored the first points in the inaugural NCAA women's basketball tournament, playing against Notre Dame. She finished the game with 43 points, though Clemson would lose to Penn State. Following the 2023 tournament, it remains the sixth-highest scoring output in NCAA Division I women's tournament history. She finished her senior season leading Division I women's basketball in scoring, with 29.3 points per game. As her senior season coincided with the NCAA beginning to officially sponsor women's basketball, she was the first player to finish as Division I's scoring leader.

Kennedy-Dixon finished her collegiate career averaging 24.5 ppg in 127 games played. She also scored at least 20 points in a record 93 games. She remains the all-time Clemson and ACC leader in many statistical categories including total points, with 3,113.

== National team career ==
Kennedy-Dixon represented the United States in 1982.

== Administrative career ==
After finishing her playing career at Clemson, Kennedy-Dixon played for some professional leagues that eventually folded. She then returned to Clemson and became an administrator for the university. She served Clemson's athletic department in various roles for 31 years. From 2005 to 2014, she served as Clemson's Senior Women's Administrator. Then from 2014 to 2017, she was the university's Assistant Athletic Director for Athletic Academic Services. In July 2017, she retired from her administrative career. In her final years with Clemson prior to retiring, she helped implement the Tiger Trust Program. The program aims to encourage former student-athletes who left Clemson early in pursuit of a professional career to return and finish their requirements.

== NCAA career records ==
- Career points (3,113) – Clemson and ACC
- Career rebounds (1,252) – Clemson and ACC
- Career field goals made (1,349) – Clemson and ACC
- Career field goals attempted (2,688) – Clemson and ACC
- Single-season points (908 in 1981–82) – Clemson and ACC
- Single-season points per game (29.3 in 1981–82) – Clemson and ACC
- Single-season rebounds (400 in 1981–82) – Clemson and ACC
- Single-season rebounds per game (12.9 in 1981–82) – Clemson and ACC
- Single-season field goals made (392 in 1981–82) – Clemson and ACC
- Single-season field goals attempted (760 in 1981–82) – Clemson and ACC

== Personal life and death ==
She married Marvin S. Dixon on May 27, 1989. The couple had two children: Marvin Jalen and Jasmine Elaine. Kennedy-Dixon died on July 23, 2018, as a result of cancer.

== Legacy ==
In 1989, Kennedy-Dixon was inducted into the Clemson Athletic Hall of Fame. She was the first woman inducted into the Clemson Ring of Honor in 2000. She was named to the ACC's 50th anniversary team in 2002, and was later honored as Clemson women's basketball's ACC Legend in 2005. Kennedy-Dixon was also inducted into the South Carolina Athletic Hall of Fame as well. Clemson honored Kennedy-Dixon in a 2019 game against North Carolina. In 2022, the Clemson Undergraduate Student Government renamed its Leadership Grant-in-Aid program after Kennedy-Dixon.

== See also ==
- List of NCAA Division I women's basketball season scoring leaders
