= Mercer Bears women's basketball =

American women's collegiate basketball team

Mercer Bears
2024–25 Mercer Bears women's basketball team
- University: Mercer University
- Head coach: Michelle Clark-Heard (1st season)
- Location: Macon, Georgia
- Arena: Hawkins Arena (capacity: 3,500)
- Conference: SoCon
- Nickname: Bears
- Colors: Black and orange
- Student section: Mercer Maniacs

NCAA Division I tournament Final Four
- NCAA Division II; 1985
Other NCAA Division I tournament results
Elite Eight	NCAA Division II; 1985
Sweet Sixteen	NCAA Division II; 1985
Appearances	NCAA Division II; 1985 NCAA Division I 2018, 2019, 2021, 2022

AIAW tournament quarterfinals
- 1973
Other AIAW tournament results
Appearances	1973, 1980

Conference tournament champions
- SWAC; 1972 GAIAW; 1974, 1976, 1979, 1980 SoCon; 2018, 2019, 2021, 2022

Conference regular-season champions
- SWAC; 1972 GAIAW; 1980, 1982 (GAIAW) NSAWC/TWAC; 1991, 1992 SoCon; 2016, 2017, 2018, 2019, 2022

The Mercer Bears women's basketball team represents Mercer University in Macon, Georgia, United States. The school's team currently competes in the Southern Conference.

== History ==
Mercer began play in 1970. As of the end of the 2017–18 Southern Conference season, they had an all-time record of 688–670. Mercer played in the Southern Women's Athletic Conference for one season (1971–72) before joining the Georgia AIAW in 1972, playing until 1981. In the 1973 AIAW Tournament, they beat Long Beach State 55–46 before losing to South Connecticut State 58–46 in the quarterfinals. They lost to Texas in the 1980 AIAW National Division I Basketball Championship 81–80. They played as an independent from 1982 to 1985 before joining the New South Women's Athletic Conference in 1985. The conference merged with the Trans-America Athletic Conference in 1991, with the conference name changing to the Atlantic Sun Conference in 2001. Mercer played in the conference until 2014, when they joined the Southern Conference. Mercer played in the 1985 NCAA Division II basketball tournament, making the Final Four after beating North Alabama 90–86 (in OT) and Quinnipiac 86–76 before losing to Central Missouri 82–79. The Bears did not make another postseason appearance until the 2013 Women's Basketball Invitational. They made the WBI again in 2015 and the WNIT in 2016. The Bears won their second-straight Division I conference championship in 2019, defeating Furman 68–66 to win the Southern Conference title, earning their second appearance in the Division I NCAA basketball tournament.

== Postseason ==
=== NCAA Division I tournament results ===
The Bears have appeared in the NCAA Division I Tournament four times. Their combined record is 0–4.

Year	Seed	Round	Opponent	Result
2018	#13	First Round	#4 Georgia	L 63–68
2019	#15	First Round	#2 Iowa	L 61–66
2021	#16	First Round	#1 South Carolina	L 53–79
2022	#15	First Round	#2 Connecticut	L 83–38

=== NCAA Division II tournament results ===
The Bears appeared in one NCAA Division II Tournament. Their combined record was 2–1.

Year	Round	Opponent	Result
1985	Regional Finals; Elite Eight; Final Four	North Alabama; Quinnipiac; Central Missouri State	W, 90–86 (OT); W, 86–76; L, 79–82
