= Jim Davis (basketball coach) =

American college basketball coach

Current position
- Record: 554–334 (college); 127–35 (junior college); 197–93 (high school)

Biographical details
- Born: September 29, 1946 (age 80); Englewood, Tennessee, U.S.

Coaching career (HC unless noted)
- 1967–1969: Englewood JHS
- 1969–1979: Madisonville HS; Charleston HS; McMinn County HS
- 1979–1985: Roane State CC
- 1985–1986: Florida (asst.)
- 1986–1987: Middle Tennessee
- 1987–2005: Clemson
- 2009: Minnesota Lynx (asst.)
- 2010–2012: Young Harris (asst.)
- 2012–2016: Tennessee Tech
- 2018–2019: Young Harris

Accomplishments and honors

Championships
- NJCAA (1984); OVC regular season (1986); 2× ACC tournament (1996, 1999); OVC East Division (2013)

Awards
- 2× ACC Coach of the Year (1990, 1994); TJCCAA Hall of Fame (1996)

James Lee Davis (born September 29, 1946) is an American former college basketball coach. He was most recently the women's head coach at Young Harris.

== Head coaching record ==
Record table
Season	Team	Overall	Conference	Standing	Postseason
Middle Tennessee Blue Raiders (Ohio Valley Conference) (1986–1987)
1986–87	Middle Tennessee	19–8	12–2	T–1st	
Middle Tennessee:		19–8 (.704)	12–2 (.857)		
Clemson Tigers (Atlantic Coast Conference) (1987–2005)
1987–88	Clemson	21–9	8–6	4th	NCAA First Round
1988–89	Clemson	20–11	9–5	3rd	NCAA Second Round
1989–90	Clemson	22–10	10–4	3rd	NCAA Sweet 16
1990–91	Clemson	22–11	8–6	4th	NCAA Elite Eight
1991–92	Clemson	21–10	9–7	T–3rd	NCAA Second Round
1992–93	Clemson	19–11	8–8	T–4th	NCAA 2nd Round
1993–94	Clemson	20–10	11–5	3rd	NCAA Second Round
1994–95	Clemson	21–11	9–7	5th	WNIT Quarterfinals
1995–96	Clemson	23–8	9–7	4th	NCAA Second Round
1996–97	Clemson	19–11	8–8	6th	NCAA First Round
1997–98	Clemson	25–8	12–4	T–2nd	NCAA Second Round
1998–99	Clemson	26–6	11–5	T–3rd	NCAA Sweet 16
1999–2000	Clemson	19–12	9–7	4th	NCAA Second Round
2000–01	Clemson	21–10	10–6	2nd	NCAA Second Round
2001–02	Clemson	17–12	9–7	T–3rd	NCAA First Round
2002–03	Clemson	14–15	5–11	7th	
2003–04	Clemson	17–12	7–9	T–5th	WNIT First Round
2004–05	Clemson	8–20	2–12	11th	
Clemson:		355–197 (.643)	154–124 (.554)		
Tennessee Tech Golden Eagles (Ohio Valley Conference) (2012–2016)
2012–13	Tennessee Tech	19–12	12–4	1st (East)	
2013–14	Tennessee Tech	12–18	9–7	T–2nd (East)	
2014–15	Tennessee Tech	6-23	3–13	6th (East)	
2015–16	Tennessee Tech	10-19	6–10	4th (East)	
Tennessee Tech:		47–72 (.395)	30–34 (.469)		
Young Harris Mountain Lions (Peach Belt Conference) (2018–2019)
2018–19	Young Harris	6–22	4–18	12th	
Total:		554-334 (.624)			
National champion Postseason invitational champion Conference regular season champion Conference regular season and conference tournament champion Division regular season champion Division regular season and conference tournament champion Conference tournament champion
