= Charleston Southern Buccaneers women's basketball =

2026–27 Charleston Southern Buccaneers women's basketball team
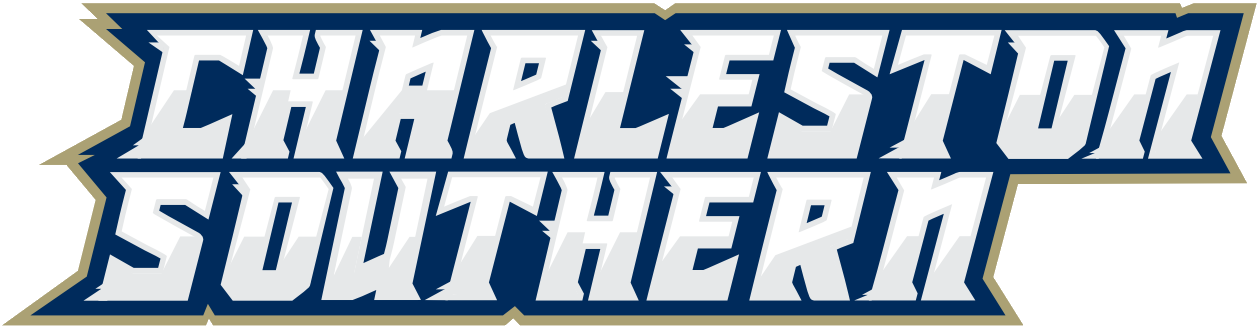
- University: Charleston Southern University
- Head coach: Tim Hays (1st season)
- Location: North Charleston, South Carolina
- Arena: Buccaneer Field House (capacity: 881)
- Conference: Big South
- Nickname: Buccaneers
- Colors: Blue and gold

The Charleston Southern Buccaneers women's basketball team is a basketball team that represents Charleston Southern University in North Charleston, South Carolina, United States. The school's team currently competes in the Big South Conference.

== History ==
Charleston Southern began play in 1976. They joined the Big South Conference in 2000. They competed in the 2012 Women's Basketball Invitational, their first ever postseason appearance. They were beaten 80-51 by Minnesota in the first round. As of the end of the 2015-16 season, the Buccaneers have an all-time record of 324-718.

== Postseason ==
Charleston Southern has made three appearances in the Women's Basketball Invitational. They have a record of 0-3.

Year	Round	Opponent	Result
2010	First Round	Appalachian State	L 47–62
2012	First Round	Minnesota	L 51–80
2017	First Round	UNC Greensboro	L 37–45
