= National Women's Invitational Tournament =

College basketball tournament, 1969–1996

- Sport: Basketball
- Founded: 1969
- Founder: Unknown
- Last season: 1996
- Folded: 1996
- No. of teams: 8
- Country: United States
- Most titles: Wayland Baptist – 9
- Related competitions: Women's NIT; Women's Basketball Invitational

The National Women's Invitational Tournament (NWIT) was a post-season tournament for women's intercollegiate basketball programs that was contested from 1969 to 1996. The original sponsorship information appears to have been lost over the ensuing years. After the NWIT folded in 1996, the concept was resurrected in 1998 by Triple Crown Sports under the same name, but the name was changed the following season to the Women's National Invitation Tournament (also known as the WNIT).

== Format ==
Begun in the same year as the Commission on Intercollegiate Athletics for Women's invitational tournament (which was assumed by the now-defunct Association for Intercollegiate Athletics for Women in 1972), the NWIT was an eight team, consolation bracket tournament held at the Amarillo Civic Center in Amarillo, Texas. Through 1974, the tournament included teams from both four-year colleges and junior colleges.

== Championship history ==
Year	Champion		Runner-up	
1969	Wayland Baptist	54	Ouachita Baptist	34
1970	Wayland Baptist	50	Midwestern State	46
1971	Wayland Baptist	63	Parsons	44
1972	Wayland Baptist	48	John F. Kennedy College	41
1973	Wayland Baptist	52	John F. Kennedy College	49
1974	Wayland Baptist	59	John F. Kennedy College	52
1975	Wayland Baptist	79	UCLA	41
1976	Wayland Baptist	90	UCLA	77
1977	Wayland Baptist	79	UCLA	75
1978	Old Dominion	70	Texas	60
1979	South Carolina	74	Drake	71
1980	Oregon State	71	North Carolina	62
1981	Georgia	75*	Arizona State	73
1982	Oregon State	76	Florida State	60
1983	New Orleans	68	Memphis State	58
1984	Vanderbilt	67	Chattanooga	66
1985	LSU	74	Florida	54
1986	Idaho	100	Northwestern State	91
1987	Arkansas	112	California	80
1988	DePaul	83	Purdue	55
1989	Oregon	67	San Diego State	64
1990	Kentucky	85	Toledo	76
1991	Santa Clara	71	Indiana	68
1992	Georgia Tech	90	Hawaiʻi	72
1993	Arkansas State	67	SMU	54
1994	Oklahoma	69	Arkansas State	65
1995	Texas A&M	85	Northwestern State	81
1996	Arizona	79	Northwestern	63

*Overtime

== See also ==
- NCAA Women's Division I Basketball Championship
- NCAA Women's Division II Basketball Championship
- NCAA Women's Division III Basketball Championship
- Women's National Invitation Tournament
- Women's Basketball Invitational
- NAIA Women's Basketball Championships
- AIAW women's basketball tournament
