= Furman Paladins women's basketball =

Furman University women's basketball team in South Carolina

2025–26 Furman Paladins women's basketball team
- University: Furman University
- Head coach: Pierre Curtis (3rd season)
- Location: Greenville, South Carolina
- Arena: Timmons Arena (capacity: 4,000)
- Conference: SoCon
- Nickname: Paladins
- Colors: Royal purple and white

NCAA Division I tournament appearances
- 1995, 2000

Conference tournament champions
- 1995, 2000

Conference regular-season champions
- 1990, 1992, 1993, 1997

The Furman Paladins women's basketball team is the basketball team that represents Furman University in Greenville, South Carolina, United States. The school's team currently competes in the Southern Conference.

== History ==
The Paladins began play in 1969. As of the end of the 2015–16 season, they have an all-time record of 535–577. In their two NCAA Tournament appearances, they lost in the first round each time, 90–52 to Louisiana Tech and 90–38 to Tennessee, respectively. They lost 74–68 to Auburn in their only WNIT appearance in 2014.

== NCAA tournament results ==
The Paladins have appeared in two NCAA Tournaments, with a combined record of 0–2.

Year	Seed	Round	Opponent	Result
1995	#15	First Round	#2 Louisiana Tech	L 52–90
2000	#16	First Round	#1 Tennessee	L 38–90
