= Annie Tribble =

American basketball coach (1932–2013)

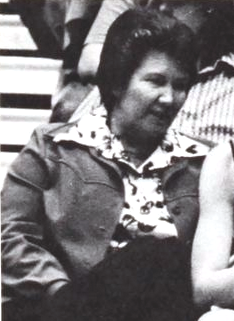
- Tribble in 1977

Biographical details
- Born: September 18, 1932; Anderson, South Carolina
- Died: April 18, 2013 (aged 80); Anderson, South Carolina
- Education: Clemson (BA 1966, MA 1969)

Coaching career (HC unless noted)
- 1967–1976: Anderson (SC)
- 1976–1987: Clemson

Head coaching record
- Overall: 200–135 (.597) (NCAA)

Accomplishments and honors

Championships
- 3 AIAW Juco (1973–74, 1974–75, 1975–76)

Annie Claire Tribble (née Stephens, September 18, 1932 – April 18, 2013) was an American college basketball coach.

Born in Anderson, South Carolina, she attended Anderson Junior College and Clemson University, graduating in 1966. She became the intramural director and instructor in physical education at Anderson in 1965, and was named the school's first women's basketball coach in 1967. Tribble led Anderson to a 155–33 record over nine seasons, and won three AIAW Junior College National Championships in 1973–74, 1974–75, and 1975–76.

In 1976, she was hired by Clemson to take over the year-old women's basketball program. Over 11 seasons at Clemson, Tribble led the Tigers to the Atlantic Coast Conference regular season championship in 1980–81 and 7 postseason tournaments, including the inaugural NCAA Tournament in 1982.

Tribble was inducted into the Anderson and Clemson athletic halls of fame, and the State of South Carolina Athletic Hall of Fame. Anderson University's home court is named in her honor.

Tribble died from cancer.

== Coaching record ==
Record table
| Season | Team | Overall | Conference | Standing | Postseason |
|---|---|---|---|---|---|
Anderson Trojans () (1967–1976)
| Anderson (SC): | | 155–33 (.824) | | | |
Clemson Tigers (Atlantic Coast Conference) (1976–1987)
| 1976–77 | Clemson | 22–9 | — | — | AIAW Region II |
| 1977–78 | Clemson | 21–11 | 4–4 | 4th | AIAW Regional |
| 1978–79 | Clemson | 20–10 | 6–2 | 3rd | AIAW Region II First Round |
| 1979–80 | Clemson | 24–12 | 6–3 | 3rd | AIAW Region II First Round; NWIT |
| 1980–81 | Clemson | 23–8 | 6–1 | 1st | AIAW National First Round |
| 1981–82 | Clemson | 20–12 | 6–3 | 4th | NCAA First Round |
| 1982–83 | Clemson | 12–17 | 5–8 | 5th | |
| 1983–84 | Clemson | 21–10 | 9–5 | T-3rd | NWIT |
| 1984–85 | Clemson | 18–9 | 8–6 | 4th | |
| 1985–86 | Clemson | 12–16 | 4–10 | T-6th | |
| 1986–87 | Clemson | 7–21 | 3–11 | T-7th | |
| Clemson: | | 200–135 (.597) | 57–53 (.518) | | |
| Total: | | 355–168 (.679) | | | |
National champion Postseason invitational champion Conference regular season champion Conference regular season and conference tournament champion Division regular season champion Division regular season and conference tournament champion Conference tournament champion
