= Carolina Coliseum =

Arena in Columbia, South Carolina

Coordinates: 33°59′37″N 81°01′57″W

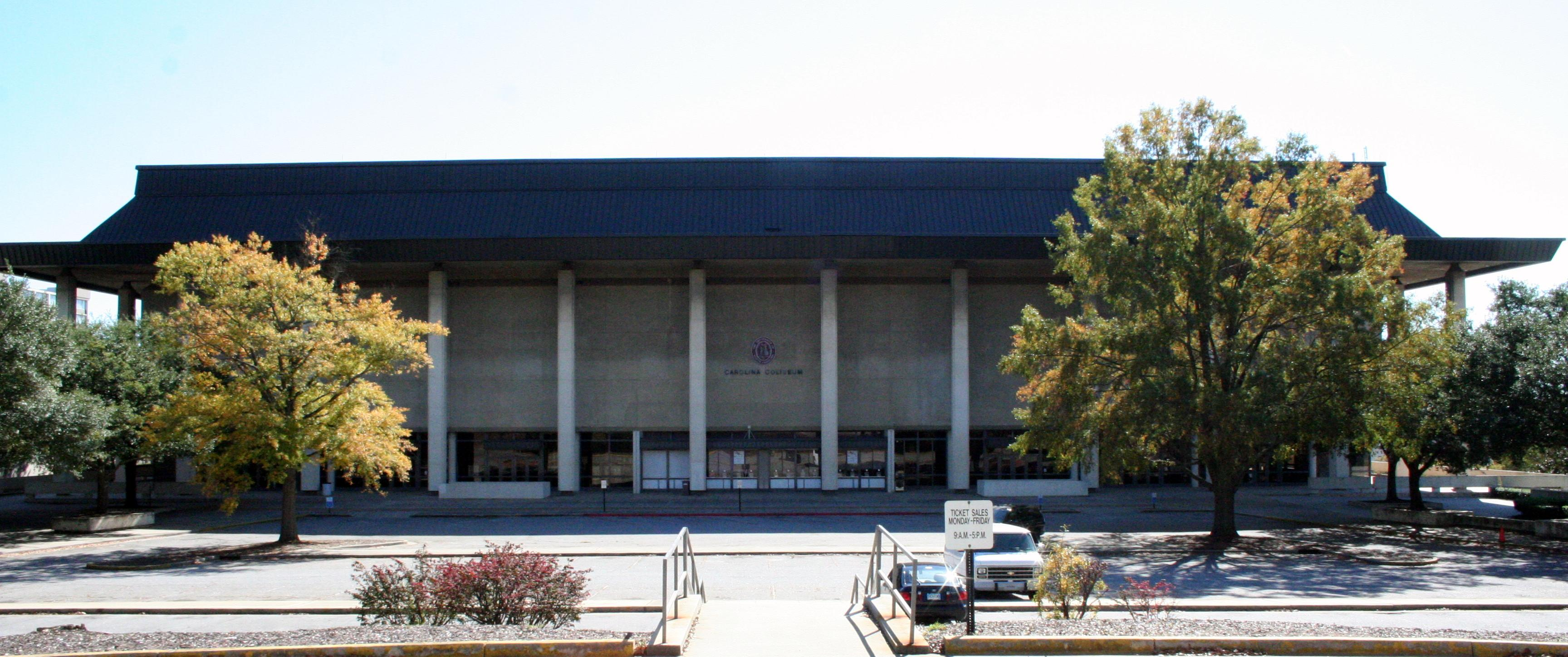
- Interactive map of Carolina Coliseum
- Location: 701 Assembly Street; Columbia, South Carolina 29201
- Owner: University of South Carolina
- Operator: University of South Carolina
- Capacity: 12,401

Construction
- Opened: November 1968
- Architects: Lyles, Bissett, Carlisle, and Wolff (LBC&W)

Tenants
- South Carolina Gamecocks (NCAA) (1968–2002; as backup venue, 2013–2014); Columbia Inferno (ECHL) (2001–2008)

Carolina Coliseum is a 12,401-seat former multi-purpose arena in Columbia, South Carolina, built in 1968 by the University of South Carolina. The Coliseum was the largest arena in South Carolina at the time of its completion. It was the home of the USC men's and women's basketball teams from 1968 to 2002, as well as Columbia's main events venue until 2002, when the Colonial Life Arena, opened a block away on Greene Street.

The Coliseum was also home to the Columbia Inferno hockey team, a franchise in the East Coast Hockey League (ECHL), until poor ticket sales caused the Inferno to fold.

The facility was unique at the time, being built to serve not only as an entertainment venue but also as a home to university classrooms with classes held in the lower levels. The high school commencement ceremonies of many high schools in the South Carolina Midlands were held annually in the arena as many school venues are too small for such ceremonies. Many of these have since moved to the Colonial Life Arena.

Prior to the building of the Coliseum, the Gamecocks had played in Carolina Fieldhouse from 1927 until it burned in 1968, and the Carolina Gymnasium (now the Longstreet Theater) prior to that.

The Coliseum was the host of the NCAA Basketball Tournament East Regional in 1970. Until 2002, when Greenville's Bon Secours Wellness Arena served as host, it was the only time the tournament was played in South Carolina. The Metro Conference men's basketball tournament was held here in 1989.

In 1977, the playing surface was renamed "Frank McGuire Arena" after then head basketball coach Frank McGuire. McGuire had been inducted into the Basketball Hall of Fame a few weeks earlier. That same year, Elvis Presley held a concert at the Coliseum, his last time performing in South Carolina.

In 2002, the Colonial Life Arena replaced the Coliseum. From 2002 to 2014, the Coliseum served as a practice facility and backup arena. In the fall of 2014, 3,000 seats were removed, and the arena floor was converted into two practice courts for the Gamecock men's and women's teams. The old Coliseum playing surface was auctioned in January for $23,215.
