= ACC women's basketball tournament =

College basketball tournament

ACC Women's Basketball Tournament
- Conference basketball championship
- Sport: College basketball
- Conference: Atlantic Coast Conference
- Number of teams: 15
- Format: Single-elimination tournament
- Current stadium: First Horizon Coliseum
- Current location: Greensboro, North Carolina
- Played: 1978–present
- Last contest: 2025
- Current champion: Duke
- Most championships: Duke, Maryland (10)
- TV partner(s): ACC Network, ESPN
- Official website: theACC.com

Sponsors
- Ally Financial

The ACC women's basketball tournament is the conference championship tournament in basketball for the Atlantic Coast Conference (ACC). The tournament has been held every year since 1978, several years before the first NCAA championships for women. It is a single-elimination tournament and seeding is based on regular season records. The winner, declared conference champion, receives the conference's automatic bid to the NCAA Women's Division I Basketball Championship.

== Championship game results ==
Date	Champion	Runner-up	Score	Location	Attendance
February 11, 1978	#2 Maryland	#1 NC State	89–82	University Hall, Charlottesville, Virginia	1,500
February 10, 1979	#1 Maryland	#2 NC State	75–73	Reynolds Coliseum, Raleigh, North Carolina	3,500
February 10, 1980	#1 NC State	#2 Maryland	85–75	Cole Field House, College Park, Maryland	N/A
February 14, 1981	#3 Maryland	#4 NC State	64–63	Littlejohn Coliseum, Clemson, South Carolina	300
February 28, 1982	#3 Maryland	#4 Clemson	93–81	Reynolds Coliseum, Raleigh, North Carolina	500
March 6, 1983	#3 Maryland	#1 NC State	84–81	Civic Center, Fayetteville, North Carolina	2,134
March 4, 1984	#5 North Carolina	#3 NC State	99–76	Civic Center, Fayetteville, North Carolina	3,733
March 3, 1985	#1 NC State	#2 North Carolina	81–80	Civic Center, Fayetteville, North Carolina	3,907
March 3, 1986	#5 Maryland	#2 North Carolina	92–74	Civic Center, Fayetteville, North Carolina	2,632
March 2, 1987	#2 NC State	#1 Virginia	57–56	Civic Center, Fayetteville, North Carolina	2,987
March 7, 1988	#2 Maryland	#1 Virginia	76–70	Civic Center, Fayetteville, North Carolina	1,223
March 6, 1989	#1 Maryland	#2 NC State	73–57	Civic Center, Fayetteville, North Carolina	2,975
March 5, 1990	#2 Virginia	#1 NC State	67–64 ^{OT}	Civic Center, Fayetteville, North Carolina	2,765
March 4, 1991	#3 NC State	#4 Clemson	84–61	Civic Center, Fayetteville, North Carolina	4,102
March 9, 1992	#1 Virginia	#7 Georgia Tech	70–69	Winthrop Coliseum, Rock Hill, South Carolina	4,154
March 8, 1993	#1 Virginia	#2 Maryland	106–103 ^{3OT}	Winthrop Coliseum, Rock Hill, South Carolina	3,716
March 7, 1994	#2 North Carolina	#1 Virginia	77–60	Winthrop Coliseum, Rock Hill, South Carolina	4,386
March 5, 1995	#2 North Carolina	#4 Duke	95–70	Winthrop Coliseum, Rock Hill, South Carolina	5,724
March 3, 1996	#4 Clemson	#2 Duke	71–54	Winthrop Coliseum, Rock Hill, South Carolina	5,067
March 2, 1997	#1 North Carolina	#6 Clemson	62–58	Independence Arena, Charlotte, North Carolina	5,543
March 1, 1998	#4 North Carolina	#2 Clemson	81–50	Independence Arena, Charlotte, North Carolina	5,534
March 1, 1999	#4 Clemson	#3 North Carolina	87–72	Independence Arena, Charlotte, North Carolina	6,021
March 6, 2000	#2 Duke	#5 North Carolina	79–76	Greensboro Coliseum, Greensboro, North Carolina	8,090
March 5, 2001	#1 Duke	#3 NC State	57–45	Greensboro Coliseum, Greensboro, North Carolina	8,933
March 4, 2002	#1 Duke	#2 North Carolina	87–80	Greensboro Coliseum, Greensboro, North Carolina	9,204
March 10, 2003	#1 Duke	#2 North Carolina	77–59	Greensboro Coliseum, Greensboro, North Carolina	11,127
March 8, 2004	#1 Duke	#2 North Carolina	63–47	Greensboro Coliseum, Greensboro, North Carolina	11,466
March 7, 2005	#1 North Carolina	#2 Duke	88–67	Greensboro Coliseum, Greensboro, North Carolina	11,578 *
March 5, 2006	#1 North Carolina	#3 Maryland	91–80	Greensboro Coliseum, Greensboro, North Carolina	10,746
March 4, 2007	#2 North Carolina	#4 NC State	60–54	Greensboro Coliseum, Greensboro, North Carolina	11,538
March 9, 2008	#1 North Carolina	#3 Duke	86–73	Greensboro Coliseum, Greensboro, North Carolina	11,132
March 8, 2009	#1 Maryland	#3 Duke	92–89 ^{OT}	Greensboro Coliseum, Greensboro, North Carolina	9,943
March 7, 2010	#1 Duke	#6 NC State	70–60	Greensboro Coliseum, Greensboro, North Carolina	9,432
March 6, 2011	#1 Duke	#6 North Carolina	81–67	Greensboro Coliseum, Greensboro, North Carolina	9,890
March 4, 2012	#3 Maryland	#4 Georgia Tech	68–65	Greensboro Coliseum, Greensboro, North Carolina	9,122
March 10, 2013	#1 Duke	#3 North Carolina	92–73	Greensboro Coliseum, Greensboro, North Carolina	8,166
March 9, 2014	#1 Notre Dame	#2 Duke	69–53	Greensboro Coliseum, Greensboro, North Carolina	8,190
March 8, 2015	#1 Notre Dame	#2 Florida State	71–58	Greensboro Coliseum, Greensboro, North Carolina	6,874
March 6, 2016	#1 Notre Dame	#3 Syracuse	68–57	Greensboro Coliseum, Greensboro, North Carolina	5,017
March 5, 2017	#1 Notre Dame	#3 Duke	84–61	HTC Center, Conway, South Carolina	3,600
March 4, 2018	#1 Louisville	#2 Notre Dame	74–72	Greensboro Coliseum, Greensboro, North Carolina	7,424
March 10, 2019	#1 Notre Dame	#2 Louisville	99–79	Greensboro Coliseum, Greensboro, North Carolina	10,104
March 8, 2020	#2 NC State	#4 Florida State	71–66	Greensboro Coliseum, Greensboro, North Carolina	7,324
March 7, 2021	#2 NC State	#1 Louisville	58–56	Greensboro Coliseum, Greensboro, North Carolina	2,063
March 6, 2022	#1 NC State	#7 Miami	60–47	Greensboro Coliseum, Greensboro, North Carolina	9,253
March 5, 2023	#3 Virginia Tech	#4 Louisville	75–67	Greensboro Coliseum, Greensboro, North Carolina	6,802
March 10, 2024	#4 Notre Dame	#2 NC State	55–51	Greensboro Coliseum, Greensboro, North Carolina	9,102
March 9, 2025	#3 Duke	#1 NC State	76–62	First Horizon Coliseum, Greensboro, North Carolina	11,823
March 8, 2026	#1 Duke	#2 Louisville	70–65 ^{OT}	Gas South Arena, Duluth, Georgia	6,592
2027				Spectrum Center, Charlotte, North Carolina	

* record attendance.

== Tournament most valuable players ==
Year	Player	School
1978	Tara Heiss	Maryland
1979	Kris Kirchner	Maryland
1980	Genia Beasley	NC State
1981	Barbara Kennedy	Clemson
1982	Marcia Richardson	Maryland
1982	Barbara Kennedy	Clemson
1983	Linda Page	NC State
1983	Jasmina Perazić	Maryland
1984	Tresa Brown	North Carolina
1985	Dawn Royster	North Carolina
1986	Deanna Tate	Maryland
1987	Donna Holt	Virginia
1988	Deanna Tate	Maryland
1989	Vicky Bullett	Maryland
1990	Andrea Stinson	NC State
1991	Sharon Manning	NC State
1992	Dawn Staley	Virginia
1993	Heather Burge	Virginia
1994	Charlotte Smith	North Carolina
1995	Charlotte Smith	North Carolina
1996	Laura Cottrell	Clemson
1997	Marion Jones	North Carolina
1998	Tracy Reid	North Carolina
1999	Itoro Umoh	Clemson
2000	Nikki Teasley	North Carolina
2001	Georgia Schweitzer	Duke
2002	Monique Currie	Duke
2003	Iciss Tillis	Duke
2004	Iciss Tillis	Duke
2005	Ivory Latta	North Carolina
2006	Ivory Latta	North Carolina
2007	Ivory Latta	North Carolina
2008	Erlana Larkins	North Carolina
2009	Marissa Coleman	Maryland
2010	Jasmine Thomas	Duke
2011	Jasmine Thomas	Duke
2012	Alyssa Thomas	Maryland
2013	Alexis Jones	Duke
2014	Jewell Loyd	Notre Dame
2015	Jewell Loyd	Notre Dame
2016	Madison Cable	Notre Dame
2017	Lindsay Allen	Notre Dame
2018	Myisha Hines-Allen	Louisville
2019	Jackie Young	Notre Dame
2020	Aislinn Konig	NC State
2021	Elissa Cunane	NC State
2022	Elissa Cunane	NC State
2023	Georgia Amoore	Virginia Tech
2024	Hannah Hidalgo	Notre Dame
2025	Oluchi Okananwa	Duke
2026	Taina Mair	Duke

== Performance by school ==
Italics indicate a school no longer in the conference.

School	Winner	Runner-up	First tournament
Duke	2000, 2001, 2002, 2003, 2004, 2010, 2011, 2013, 2025, 2026 (10)	1995, 1996, 2005, 2008, 2009, 2014, 2017 (7)	1978
Maryland	1978, 1979, 1981, 1982, 1983, 1986, 1988, 1989, 2009, 2012 (10)	1980, 1993, 2006 (3)	1978
North Carolina	1984, 1994, 1995, 1997, 1998, 2005, 2006, 2007, 2008 (9)	1985, 1986, 1999, 2000, 2002, 2003, 2004, 2011, 2013 (9)	1978
NC State	1980, 1985, 1987, 1991, 2020, 2021, 2022 (7)	1978, 1979, 1981, 1983, 1984, 1989, 1990, 2001, 2007, 2010, 2024, 2025 (12)	1978
Notre Dame	2014, 2015, 2016, 2017, 2019, 2024 (6)	2018 (1)	2014
Virginia	1990, 1992, 1993 (3)	1987, 1988, 1994 (3)	1978
Clemson	1996, 1999 (2)	1982, 1991, 1997, 1998 (4)	1978
Louisville	2018 (1)	2019, 2021, 2023, 2026 (4)	2015
Virginia Tech	2023 (1)		2005
Georgia Tech		1992, 2012 (2)	1980
Florida State		2015, 2020 (2)	1992
Syracuse		2016 (1)	2014
Miami		2022 (1)	2005
Wake Forest			1978
Boston College			2006
Pittsburgh			2014

Wake Forest reached the semifinals in 1986, 1988, and 2012; Boston College reached the semifinals in 2010 and 2020; Virginia Tech reached the semifinals in 2022; Pittsburgh reached the 2nd round in 2015, 2016, and 2020.

== Tournament sites ==
Tenure	Arena	Location
1978 (1)	University Hall	Charlottesville, Virginia
1979, 1982 (2)	Reynolds Coliseum	Raleigh, North Carolina
1980 (1)	Cole Field House	College Park, Maryland
1981 (1)	Littlejohn Coliseum	Clemson, South Carolina
1983–1991 (9)	Civic Center	Fayetteville, North Carolina
1992–1996 (5)	Winthrop Coliseum	Rock Hill, South Carolina
1997–1999 (3)	Independence Arena	Charlotte, North Carolina
2000–2016, 2018–2025 (26*)	First Horizon Coliseum	Greensboro, North Carolina
2017 (1)	HTC Center	Conway, South Carolina
2026	Gas South Arena	Duluth, Georgia
2027	Spectrum Center	Charlotte, North Carolina

On May 15, 2014, it was announced that the tournament will be held in Greensboro through 2022. However, the ACC moved the 2017 tournament to the Myrtle Beach area as part of an all conference political protest against North Carolina's Public Facilities Privacy & Security Act.

== See also ==
- ACC men's basketball tournament
