= Wake Forest Demon Deacons women's basketball =

2026–27 Wake Forest Demon Deacons women's basketball team
- University: Wake Forest University
- Head coach: Megan Gebbia (5th season)
- Location: Winston-Salem, North Carolina
- Arena: Lawrence Joel Veterans Memorial Coliseum
- Conference: Atlantic Coast Conference
- Nickname: Demon Deacons
- Colors: Old gold and black

NCAA Division I tournament second round
- 1988

NCAA Division I tournament appearances
- 1988, 2021

Uniforms
Home	Away	Alternate

The Wake Forest Demon Deacons women's basketball team represents Wake Forest in women's basketball. The school competes in the Atlantic Coast Conference in Division I of the National Collegiate Athletic Association (NCAA). The Demon Deacons play their home games at Lawrence Joel Veterans Memorial Coliseum in Winston-Salem, North Carolina.

== Year-by-year record ==
The Demon Deacons have a 718–930 all-time record through the 2025–26 season. They have made two appearances in the NCAA Tournament (1988 & 2021), and have an overall record of 1–2.

Season	Coach	Record	Conference record
1971–72	Nora Lynn Finch	5–6	n/a
1972–73	Nora Lynn Finch	12–4	n/a
1973–74	Gail Klock	5–5	n/a
1974–75	Sharron Perkins	9–11	n/a
1975–76	Sharron Perkins	4–10	n/a
1976–77	Barbara Warren	6–14	n/a
1977–78	Barbara Warren	4–19	2–4
1978–79	Barbara Warren	2–19	0–7
1979–80	Wanda Briley	7–20	1–8
1980–81	Wanda Briley	10–18	0–8
1981–82	Wanda Briley	13–17	1–9
1982–83	Wanda Briley	14–14	0–7
1983–84	Wanda Briley	13–14	2–12
1984–85	Wanda Briley	14–13	4–10
1985–86	Joe Sanchez	16–13	4–10
1986–87	Joe Sanchez	13–15	3–11
1987–88	Joe Sanchez	23–8	9–5
1988–89	Joe Sanchez	16–12	6–8
1989–90	Joe Sanchez	16–14	5–9
1990–91	Joe Sanchez	15–13	5–9
1991–92	Joe Sanchez	10–18	1–15
1992–93	Karen Freeman	14–14	4–12
1993–94	Karen Freeman	8–19	3–13
1994–95	Karen Freeman	11–16	4–12
1995–96	Karen Freeman	13–14	6–10
1996–97	Karen Freeman	12–16	3–13
1997–98	Charlene Curtis	4–23	0–16
1998–99	Charlene Curtis	8–20	3–13
1999-00	Charlene Curtis	7–21	3–13
2000–01	Charlene Curtis	11–17	3–13
2001–02	Charlene Curtis	12–16	5–11
2002–03	Charlene Curtis	13–15	3–13
2003–04	Charlene Curtis	12–17	4–12
2004–05	Mike Petersen	17–15	3–11
2005–06	Mike Petersen	12–16	3–11
2006–07	Mike Petersen	9–20	0–14
2007–08	Mike Petersen	15–15	2–12
2008–09	Mike Petersen	19–12	5–9
2009–10	Mike Petersen	18–14	7–7
2010–11	Mike Petersen	15–17	5–9
2011–12	Mike Petersen	20–14	7–9
2012–13	Jen Hoover	13–19	5–13
2013–14	Jen Hoover	15–16	5–11
2014–15	Jen Hoover	13–20	2–14
2015–16	Jen Hoover	17–16	6–10
2016–17	Jen Hoover	16–16	6–10
2017–18	Jen Hoover	14–17	5–11
2018–19	Jen Hoover	10–20	1–15
2019–20	Jen Hoover	16–16	7–11
2020–21	Jen Hoover	12–13	8–10
2021–22	Jen Hoover	16–17	4–14
2022–23	Megan Gebbia	17–17	5–13
2023–24	Megan Gebbia	7–25	2–16
2024–25	Megan Gebbia	9–20	2–16
2025–26	Megan Gebbia	14–18	4–14

=== NCAA tournament results ===
Year	Seed	Round	Opponent	Result
1988	#9	First Round; Second Round	#8 Villanova #1 Tennessee	W 53–51; L 94–66
2021	#9	First Round	#8 Oklahoma State	L 84–61

=== WNIT results ===
The Demon Deacons have appeared in the Women's National Invitation Tournament (WNIT) seven times. They have a combined record of 6–7.

Year	Round	Opponent	Result
2005	First Round; Second Round; Quarterfinals	Charlotte; South Florida; West Virginia	W 100–75; W 78–63; L 52–65
2009	First Round	Georgetown	L 61–72
2010	First Round	North Carolina A&T	L 49–79
2012	First Round; Second Round	Charlotte; James Madison	W 72–61; L 76–84^OT
2016	First Round; Second Round	Charleston; Florida Gulf Coast	W 72–69; L 58–67
2017	First Round; Second Round	Bethune Cookman; Middle Tennessee	W 71–41; L 66–73
2022	First Round; Second Round	Akron; Middle Tennessee	W 71–59; L 55–67
2023	First Round; Second Round	Morgan State; Florida	W 75–49; L 63–80
2026	First Round	Maryland Eastern Shore	L 48–59

== Roster ==
2026–27 Wake Forest Demon Deacons women's basketball team
Players
Coaches

Pos.	#	Name	Height	Year	Previous school	Hometown
G	1	Adora Nwude	5 ft 8 in (1.73 m)	Fr	Bullis School	Vienna, VA
G	3	Alexis Cashdollar	5 ft 9 in (1.75 m)	Fr	Mars Area	Mars, PA
G/F	4	Ramiyah Byrd	5 ft 11 in (1.8 m)	RS Jr	Cincinnati	Colorado Springs, CO
G	5	Aurora Sørbye	5 ft 9 in (1.75 m)	Jr	Metis	Bergen, Norway
F	7	Savannah Metcalfe	6 ft 5 in (1.96 m)	So	Penrhos	Perth, Australia
G	8	Breauna Ware	5 ft 7 in (1.7 m)	GS	Wisconsin	Queens, NY
F	9	Opal Bird	6 ft 3 in (1.91 m)	So	Australian Institute of Sport	Sydney, Australia
F	10	Helena Danielewicz	6 ft 2 in (1.88 m)	Fr	Pawel Adamowicz	Kościerzyna, Poland
G/F	14	Mary Carter	6 ft 3 in (1.91 m)	Sr	Antelope	Rocklin, CA
G/F	22	Madisyn Jordan	6 ft 1 in (1.85 m)	Sr	Panther Creek	Morrisville, NC
G	23	Oshauna Holland	5 ft 8 in (1.73 m)	Fr	Stuart W. Cramer	Belmont, NC
F	24	Mckenzie Swanson	6 ft 3 in (1.91 m)	RS So	Butler	Rochester, MI
G	35	Grace Galbavy	6 ft 0 in (1.83 m)	So	Perkiomen Valley	Pennsburg, PA

Head coach

- Megan Gebbia (Towson)

Assistant coach(es)

- Emily Stallings (East Stroudsburg)
- Jimmy Colloton (Wittenberg)
- Joey White (West Virginia)
- Teren Hart (Miami (FL))

Legend

- (C) Team captain
- (S) Suspended
- (I) Ineligible
- (W) Walk-on
- Injured
- Current redshirt

Roster
Last update: September 2, 2026
