= Clemson Tigers women's basketball =

Clemson Tigers
2026–27 Clemson Tigers women's basketball team
- University: Clemson University
- First season: 1975–76
- Head coach: Shawn Poppie (3rd season)
- Location: Clemson, South Carolina
- Arena: Littlejohn Coliseum (capacity: 9,000)
- Conference: Atlantic Coast Conference
- Nickname: Tigers
- Colors: Orange and regalia
- All-time record: 771–681

NCAA Division I tournament Elite Eight
- 1991
Other NCAA Division I tournament results
Sweet Sixteen	1989, 1990, 1991, 1999
Appearances	1982, 1988, 1989, 1990, 1991, 1992, 1993, 1994, 1996, 1997, 1998, 1999, 2000, 2001, 2002, 2019, 2026

AIAW tournament appearances
- 1981

Conference tournament champions
- 1996, 1999

Conference regular-season champions
- 1981

Uniforms
Home	Away	Alternate

The Clemson Tigers women's basketball team represents Clemson University in women's college basketball competition. The Tigers compete in NCAA Division I as a member of the Atlantic Coast Conference (ACC). Clemson won the ACC women's basketball tournament in 1996 and 1999, and won the ACC regular season title in 1981. They are coached by Shawn Poppie.

== Team history ==
Clemson began sponsoring a women's basketball team in the 1975–76 season. After winning the ACC regular season championship in 1980–81, the Tigers were invited to the inaugural NCAA Women's Division I Basketball Championship in 1982. In total, Clemson has participated in 15 NCAA Tournaments. The Tigers won two ACC women's basketball tournaments in 1996 and 1999, under coach Jim Davis. Back in the 1982-83 season, the Clemson Women’s team was still getting established as an NCAA program under coach Annie Tribble. Competing in the ACC, the team put up a 12-17 record overall. Forward, Barbra Kennedy was the main star, on that roster. Finishing her college career as one of the best glass-cleaners in school history. That early decade helped set up the program a later success when they started making later post season runs.

=== Awards ===
ACC Coach of the Year

- Jim Davis - 1990, 1994
- Amanda Butler - 2019

ACC Player of the Year

- Jessica Barr - 1994

ACC Rookie of the Year

- Barbara Kennedy - 1979
- Sheila Cobb - 1980
- Kerry Boyatt - 1990

ACC 50th Anniversary Team

- Jessica Barr
- Chrissy Floyd
- Barbara Kennedy
- Itoro Umoh

All-Americans

- 1981 - Barbara Kennedy (Street & Smith)
- 1982 - Barbara Kennedy (Kodak, WBCA, Basketball Weekly)
- 1994 - Jessica Barr (Kodak)

ACC All-Defensive Team

- Erin Batth - 2000, 2001
- Chrissy Floyd - 2002
- Lele Hardy - 2009, 2010

Retired Jersey

- 42 - Barbara Kennedy

All-ACC First Team

- Donna Forester - 1978
- Cissy Bristol - 1979
- Barbara Kennedy - 1980, 1981, 1982
- Mary Anne Cubelic - 1982, 1983
- Janet Knight - 1985
- Shandy Bryan - 1993
- Jessica Barr - 1994
- Tara Saunooke - 1995
- Stephanie Ridgeway - 1996
- Amy Geren - 1998, 1999
- Itoro Umoh - 1999
- Chrissy Floyd - 2002, 2003
- Lakeia Stokes - 2004
- Delicia Washington - 2022

All-ACC Second Team

- Bobbie Mims - 1978
- Barbara Kennedy - 1979
- Janet Knight - 1984
- Jacqui Jones - 1984
- Sandy Bishop - 1985
- Karen Ann Jenkins - 1988
- Louise Greenwood - 1989
- Michelle Bryant - 1989
- Kerry Boyatt - 1990
- Jackie Farmer - 1991
- Cheron Wells - 1992
- Itoro Umoh - 1997, 1998
- Chrissy Floyd - 2000, 2001
- Erin Batth - 2001
- Lele Hardy - 2010
- Kobi Thornton – 2018
- Delicia Washington – 2021
- Amari Robinson – 2023, 2024
- Mia Moore – 2026

All-ACC Third Team

- Angie Cossey - 2000
- Marci Glenney - 2002
- Lele Hardy - 2009

== Coaching history ==
=== 2026–27 coaching staff ===
Name	Position	Seasons at Clemson
Shawn Poppie	Head Coach	3
Chris Ayers	Associate Head Coach	3
Sydni Means	Assistant Coach	1
Katelyn Grisillo	Assistant Coach	3
Jon Goldberg	Offensive Coordinator/Assistant Coach	3
Jayda Worthy	Assistant Coach	3

== Year by year results ==
Season	Team	Overall	Conference	Standing	Postseason	Coaches' poll	AP poll
Mary King (Independent) (1975–1976)
1975–76	Mary King	14–11	–		AIAW Region II Tournament		
Mary King:		14–11	–				
Annie Tribble (Independent, ACC) (1976–1987)
1976–77	Annie Tribble	22–9	–		AIAW Region II Tournament		
Atlantic Coast Conference
1977–78	Annie Tribble	21–11	4–4	4th	AIAW Region II Tournament		
1978–79	Annie Tribble	20–10	6–2	3rd	AIAW Region II Tournament		
1979–80	Annie Tribble	24–12	6–3	3rd	NWIT Seventh Place		
1980–81	Annie Tribble	23–8	6–1	1st	AIAW First Round		20
1981–82	Annie Tribble	20–12	6–3	4th	NCAA First Round		
1982–83	Annie Tribble	12–17	5–8	5th			
1983–84	Annie Tribble	21–10	9–5	T-3rd	NWIT Third Place		
1984–85	Annie Tribble	18–9	8–6	4th			
1985–86	Annie Tribble	12–16	4–10	T-6th			
1986–87	Annie Tribble	7–21	3–11	T-7th			
Annie Tribble:		200–135	57–53				
Jim Davis (ACC) (1987–2005)
1987-88	Jim Davis	21–9	8–6	4th	NCAA Second Round (Bye)	20	
1988-89	Jim Davis	20–11	9–5	3rd	NCAA Sweet Sixteen	13	
1989-90	Jim Davis	22–10	10–4	3rd	NCAA Sweet Sixteen	19	
1990-91	Jim Davis	22–11	8–6	4th	NCAA Elite Eight	8	21
1991-92	Jim Davis	21–10	9–7	T-3rd	NCAA Second Round (Bye)	19	20
1992-93	Jim Davis	19–11	8–8	T-4th	NCAA Second Round (Bye)		
1993-94	Jim Davis	20–10	11–5	3rd	NCAA Second Round	22	
1994-95	Jim Davis	21–11	9–7	5th	NWIT Fifth Place		
1995-96	Jim Davis	23–8	9–7	4th	NCAA Second Round	17	14
1996-97	Jim Davis	19–11	8–8	6th	NCAA First Round	25	21
1997-98	Jim Davis	25–8	12–4	T-2nd	NCAA Second Round	21	14
1998-99	Jim Davis	26–6	11–5	T-3rd	NCAA Sweet Sixteen	10	10
1999-2000	Jim Davis	19–12	9–7	4th	NCAA Second Round		
2000-01	Jim Davis	21–10	10–6	2nd	NCAA Second Round	22	22
2001-02	Jim Davis	17–12	9–7	T-3rd	NCAA First Round		
2002-03	Jim Davis	14–15	5–11	7th			
2003-04	Jim Davis	17–12	7–9	T-5th	WNIT First Round		
2004-05	Jim Davis	8–20	2–12	11th			
Jim Davis:		355–197	154–124				
Cristy McKinney (ACC) (2005–2010)
2005-06	Cristy McKinney	8–21	2–12	T-11th			
2006-07	Cristy McKinney	12–18	4–10	9th			
2007-08	Cristy McKinney	12–19	4–10	9th			
2008-09	Cristy McKinney	14–17	2–12	T-10th			
2009-10	Cristy McKinney	13–18	4–10	T-10th			
Cristy McKinney:		59–93	16–54				
Itoro Coleman (ACC) (2011–2014)
2010-11	Itoro Coleman	10–20	3–11	11th			
2011-12	Itoro Coleman	6–22	2–14	T-11th			
2012-13	Itoro Coleman	9–21	5–13	T-9th			
Itoro Coleman:		25–63	10–38				
Audra Smith (ACC) (2013–2018)
2013-14	Audra Smith	13–19	4–12	13th			
2014-15	Audra Smith	9–21	1–15	15th			
2015-16	Audra Smith	4–26	0–16	15th			
2016-17	Audra Smith	15–16	3–13	13th			
2017-18	Audra Smith	11–19	1–15	15th			
Audra Smith:		52–101	9–71				
Amanda Butler (ACC) (2018–2024)
2018–19	Amanda Butler	20–13	9–7	7th	NCAA Second Round		
2019–20	Amanda Butler	8–23	3–15	14th			
2020–21	Amanda Butler	12–14	5–12	11th	WNIT Second Round		
2021–22	Amanda Butler	10–21	3–15	13th			
2022–23	Amanda Butler	19–16	7–11	10th	WNIT Super 16		
2023–24	Amanda Butler	12–19	5–13	T–12th			
Amanda Butler:		81–106	32–73				
Shawn Poppie (ACC) (2024–present)
2024–25	Shawn Poppie	14–17	6–12	T–12th			
2025–26	Shawn Poppie	21–12	11–7	T-8th	NCAA First Round		
Shawn Poppie:		35–29	17–19				
Total:		792–693 (.533)					
National champion Postseason invitational champion Conference regular season champion Conference regular season and conference tournament champion Division regular season champion Division regular season and conference tournament champion Conference tournament champion

== Postseason results ==
=== NCAA Division I ===
Clemson has appeared in 17 NCAA Tournaments with a record of 15–17.

Year	Seed	Round	Opponent	Result
1982	#5	First round	#4 Penn State	L 96-75
1988	#5	Second round	#4 James Madison	L 70-63
1989	#4	Second round Sweet Sixteen	#5 Georgia #1 Auburn	W 78-65; L 71-60
1990	#5	First round Second round Sweet Sixteen	#12 Manhattan #4 Connecticut #1 Tennessee	W 79-55; W 61-59; L 80-62
1991	#4	Second round Sweet Sixteen; Elite Eight	#5 Providence #8 James Madison #3 Connecticut	W 103-91; W 57-55; L 60-57
1992	#5	First round Second round	#12 Chattanooga #4 West Virginia	W 76-72; L 73-72
1993	#5	First round Second round	#12 Xavier #4 Stephen F. Austin	W 70-64; L 89-78
1994	#9	First round Second round	#8 FIU #1 Tennessee	W 65-64; L 78-66
1996	#3	First round Second round	#14 Austin Peay #11 Stephen F. Austin	W 79-52; L 93-88
1997	#5	First round	#12 Marquette	L 70-66
1998	#6	First round Second round	#11 Miami (FL) #3 Louisiana Tech	W 60-49; L 74-52
1999	#2	First round Second round Sweet Sixteen	#15 Florida A&M #7 Illinois #3 Georgia	W 76-45; W 63-51; L 67-54
2000	#9	First round Second round	#8 Drake #1 Connecticut	W 64-50; L 83-45
2001	#5	First round Second round	#12 Chattanooga #4 Xavier	W 51-49; L 77-62
2002	#11	First round	#6 Arkansas	L 78-66
2019	#9	First round Second round	#8 South Dakota #1 Mississippi State	W 79-66; L 85-61
2026	#8	First round	#9 Southern California	L 67-71 (OT)

=== AIAW Division I ===
Clemson has appeared in one AIAW Division I Basketball Tournament with a record of 0–1.

Year	Round	Opponent	Result
1981	First round	Rutgers	L, 76–99

=== WNIT ===
Clemson has appeared in three Women's National Invitation Tournaments (WNIT) with a record of 3–3.

Year	Round	Opponent	Result
2004	Round 1	Charlotte	L 71–78
2021	First Round; Second Round	Ohio; Delaware	W 65–60; L 74–87
2023	Round 1 Round 2 Super 16	High Point; Auburn; Florida	W 66–46; W 56–55; L 63–73

== Roster ==
2026–27 Clemson Tigers women's basketball team
Players
Coaches

Pos.	#	Name	Height	Year	Previous school	Hometown
G	0	Holland Harris	6 ft 1 in (1.85 m)	So	Montverde Academy	Orlando, FL
G	1	Amaia Jackson	5 ft 8 in (1.73 m)	So	Montverde Academy	Rochester, NY
F	2	Ja'Kerra Butler	6 ft 1 in (1.85 m)	RS Fr	Hebron Christian	Lawrenceville, GA
G	3	Mackenzie Nelson	5 ft 8 in (1.73 m)	RS Jr	Virginia Tech	Greenwich, CT
F	7	Edie Clarke	6 ft 4 in (1.93 m)	Jr	Saint Mary's	Melbourne, Australia
F	8	Yakiya Milton	6 ft 5 in (1.96 m)	Sr	USC	Jacksonville, FL
G	11	Rusne Augustinaite	6 ft 0 in (1.83 m)	Sr	Georgia Tech	Šiauliai, Lithuania
F	20	Kimora Fields	6 ft 1 in (1.85 m)	Fr	Bradley Central	Cleveland, TN
F	21	Morgan Miller	6 ft 2 in (1.88 m)	Jr	Andover	Andover, MN
F	22	Julia Scott	6 ft 3 in (1.91 m)	Fr	Albertus Magnus	Nanuet, NY
G	23	Taliyah Henderson	6 ft 1 in (1.85 m)	So	North Carolina	Vail, AZ
G	24	Meeyah Green	5 ft 8 in (1.73 m)	Fr	Webb School of Knoxville	Knoxville, TN
F	34	Jenna Lawrence	6 ft 3 in (1.91 m)	So	Arkansas	Melbourne, AR

Head coach

- Shawn Poppie (Limestone)

Assistant coach(es)

- Chris Ayers (Florida A&M)
- Sydni Means (Mercer)
- Katelyn Grisillo (USC Aiken)
- Jon Goldberg (Emerson)
- Jayda Worthy (Radford)

Legend

- (C) Team captain
- (S) Suspended
- (I) Ineligible
- (W) Walk-on
- Injured
- Current redshirt

Roster
Last update: August 29, 2026
