= 2005–06 Clemson Tigers women's basketball team =

Women's college basketball season

2005–06 Clemson Tigers women's basketball
- Conference: Atlantic Coast Conference
- Record: 8–21 (2–12 ACC)
- Head coach: Cristy McKinney (1st season)
- Home arena: Littlejohn Coliseum

2005–06 ACC women's basketball standings
| | Conf. | | | | Overall |
| Team | W | | L | PCT | W | | L | PCT |
|---|---|---|---|---|---|---|---|---|
| No. 1 North Carolina † | 13 | – | 1 | .929 | 33 | – | 2 | .943 |
| No. 3 Maryland | 12 | – | 2 | .857 | 34 | – | 4 | .895 |
| No. 4 Duke | 12 | – | 2 | .857 | 31 | – | 4 | .886 |
| Florida State | 10 | – | 4 | .714 | 20 | – | 10 | .667 |
| NC State | 7 | – | 7 | .500 | 19 | – | 12 | .613 |
| Virginia Tech | 6 | – | 8 | .429 | 21 | – | 10 | .677 |
| Boston College | 6 | – | 8 | .429 | 21 | – | 12 | .636 |
| Miami (FL) | 6 | – | 8 | .429 | 17 | – | 13 | .567 |
| Virginia | 5 | – | 9 | .357 | 20 | – | 12 | .625 |
| Wake Forest | 3 | – | 11 | .214 | 12 | – | 16 | .429 |
| Georgia Tech | 2 | – | 12 | .143 | 14 | – | 15 | .483 |
| Clemson | 2 | – | 12 | .143 | 8 | – | 21 | .276 |
† 2006 ACC tournament winner Rankings from AP poll

The 2005–06 Clemson Tigers women's basketball team represented Clemson University during the 2005–06 NCAA Division I women's basketball season. The Tigers were led by first year head coach Cristy McKinney. The Tigers, members of the Atlantic Coast Conference, played their home games at Littlejohn Coliseum.

== Schedule ==
| Date time, TV | Rank^{#} | Opponent^{#} | Result | Record | Site city, state |
|---|---|---|---|---|---|
| November 11, 2005* | | vs. Missouri; BTI/WBCA Classic | L 54–78 | 0–1 | Wells Fargo Arena; Tempe, Arizona |
| November 12, 2005* | | vs. No. 17 Vanderbilt; BTI/WBCA Classic | L 49–86 | 0–2 | Wells Fargo Arena; Tempe, Arizona |
| November 18, 2005* | | Tennessee Tech | L 62–71 | 0–3 | Littlejohn Coliseum; Clemson, South Carolina |
| November 21, 2005* | | Mississippi | L 66–70 | 0–4 | Littlejohn Coliseum; Clemson, South Carolina |
| November 25, 2005* | | vs. Belmont; Lady Tiger Thanksgiving Classic | L 62–85 | 0–5 | Elma Roane Fieldhouse; Memphis, Tennessee |
| November 26, 2005* | | at Memphis; Lady Tiger Thanksgiving Classic | W 97–88 | 1–5 | Elma Roane Fieldhouse; Memphis, Tennessee |
| November 30, 2005* | | at Furman | W 82–55 | 2–5 | Timmons Arena; Greenville, South Carolina |
| December 3, 2005* | | No. 21 UCLA | L 63–76 | 2–6 | Littlejohn Coliseum; Clemson, South Carolina |
| December 11, 2005* | | San Diego | W 72–68 | 3–6 | Littlejohn Coliseum; Clemson, South Carolina |
| December 18, 2005* | | Wagner | W 94–66 | 4–6 | Littlejohn Coliseum; Clemson, South Carolina |
| December 20, 2005* | | Winthrop | W 52–51 | 5–6 | Littlejohn Coliseum; Clemson, South Carolina |
| December 23, 2005* | | Savannah State | W 97–62 | 6–6 | Littlejohn Coliseum; Clemson, South Carolina |
| December 30, 2005* | | at Georgetown | L 56–69 | 6–7 | McDonough Gymnasium; Washington, D. C. |
| January 2, 2006* | | South Carolina rivalry | L 46–77 | 6–8 | Littlejohn Coliseum; Clemson, South Carolina |
| January 6, 2006 | | at No. 5 North Carolina | L 61–102 | 6–9 (0–1) | Carmichael Arena; Chapel Hill, North Carolina |
| January 8, 2006 | | Georgia Tech | W 72–63 | 7–9 (1–1) | Littlejohn Coliseum; Clemson, South Carolina |
| January 12, 2006 | | Miami | L 52–74 | 7–10 (1–2) | Littlejohn Coliseum; Clemson, South Carolina |
| January 15, 2006 | | Wake Forest | W 75–68 | 8–10 (2–2) | Littlejohn Coliseum; Clemson, South Carolina |
| January 19, 2006 | | at Florida State | L 66–80 | 8–11 (2–3) | Donald L. Tucker Civic Center; Tallahassee, Florida |
| January 26, 2006 | | No. 2 Duke | L 65–97 | 8–12 (2–4) | Littlejohn Coliseum; Clemson, South Carolina |
| January 29, 2006 | | at Georgia Tech | L 64–83 | 8–13 (2–5) | Alexander Memorial Coliseum; Atlanta, Georgia |
| February 5, 2006 | | No. 23 Boston College | L 53–70 | 8–14 (2–6) | Littlejohn Coliseum; Clemson, South Carolina |
| February 9, 2006 | | at Virginia Tech | L 70–82 | 8–15 (2–7) | Cassell Coliseum; Blacksburg, Virginia |
| February 12, 2006 | | at Wake Forest | L 70–82 | 8–16 (2–8) | LJVM Coliseum; Winston-Salem, North Carolina |
| February 16, 2006 | | NC State | L 69–78 | 8–17 (2–9) | Littlejohn Coliseum; Clemson, South Carolina |
| February 19, 2006 | | Florida State | L 72–80 ^{OT} | 8–18 (2–10) | Littlejohn Coliseum; Clemson, South Carolina |
| February 23, 2006 | | at No. 4 Maryland | L 63–89 | 8–19 (2–11) | Comcast Center; College Park, Maryland |
| February 26, 2006 | | at Virginia | L 64–83 | 8–20 (2–12) | University Hall; Charlottesville, Virginia |
ACC Tournament
| March 2, 2006* | | vs. NC State; ACC Tournament first round | L 53–67 | 8–21 (2–12) | Greensboro Coliseum; Greensboro, North Carolina |
*Non-conference game. ^{#}Rankings from AP Poll. (#) Tournament seedings in parentheses.
