= 2005–06 Maryland Terrapins women's basketball team =

Intercollegiate basketball season

2005–06 Maryland Terrapins women's basketball
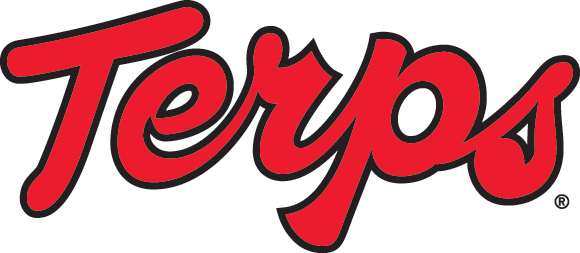

NCAA Tournament, National Champions Terrapin Classic champions

National Championship Game, W 78–75 ^{OT} vs. Duke
- Conference: Atlantic Coast Conference

Ranking
- Coaches: No. 1
- AP: No. 3
- Record: 34–4 (12–2 ACC)
- Head coach: Brenda Frese (4th season)
- Assistant coaches: Jeff Walz (4th season); Erica Floyd (4th season); Joanna Bernabei (3rd season)
- Home arena: Comcast Center

2005–06 ACC women's basketball standings
	Conf.				Overall
Team	W		L	PCT	W		L	PCT
No. 1 North Carolina †	13	–	1	.929	33	–	2	.943
No. 3 Maryland	12	–	2	.857	34	–	4	.895
No. 4 Duke	12	–	2	.857	31	–	4	.886
Florida State	10	–	4	.714	20	–	10	.667
NC State	7	–	7	.500	19	–	12	.613
Virginia Tech	6	–	8	.429	21	–	10	.677
Boston College	6	–	8	.429	21	–	12	.636
Miami (FL)	6	–	8	.429	17	–	13	.567
Virginia	5	–	9	.357	20	–	12	.625
Wake Forest	3	–	11	.214	12	–	16	.429
Georgia Tech	2	–	12	.143	14	–	15	.483
Clemson	2	–	12	.143	8	–	21	.276
† 2006 ACC tournament winner Rankings from AP poll

The 2005–06 Maryland Terrapins women's basketball team represented the University of Maryland, College Park in the 2005–2006 NCAA Division I basketball season. The Terps were coached by Brenda Frese. The Terps are a member of the Atlantic Coast Conference and won the NCAA championship.

== Roster ==
2005–06 Maryland Terrapins women's basketball team
Players
Coaches

Pos.	#	Name	Height	Year	Previous school	Hometown
G/F	32	Charmaine Carr	6 ft 1 in (1.85 m)	Sr	Gwynn Park	Accokeek, Maryland
G/F	25	Marissa Coleman	6 ft 1 in (1.85 m)	Fr	St. John's College H.S.	Cheltenham, Maryland
G	22	Shay Doron	5 ft 9 in (1.75 m)	Jr	Christ the King	Ramat Hasharon, Israel
F/C	15	Laura Harper	6 ft 4 in (1.93 m)	So	Cheltenham	Elkins Park, Pennsylvania
F/C	1	Crystal Langhorne	6 ft 2 in (1.88 m)	So	Willingboro	Willingboro, New Jersey
G	21	Ashleigh Newman	5 ft 10 in (1.78 m)	So	Shelbyville Central	Shelbyville, Tennessee
C	44	Aurelie Noirez	6 ft 2 in (1.88 m)	Jr	Lycée Arago Secondary (Reims)	Vandœuvre-lès-Nancy, France
F/C	55	Jade Perry	6 ft 1 in (1.85 m)	So	Muhlenberg North	Central City, Kentucky
F/C	40	Angel Ross	6 ft 2 in (1.88 m)	Sr	Midlothian	Midlothian, Virginia
G	20	Kristi Toliver	5 ft 7 in (1.7 m)	Fr	Harrisonburg	Harrisonburg, Virginia

Head coach

- Brenda Frese (Arizona)

Assistant coach(es)

- Jeff Walz (Northern Kentucky)
- Erica Floyd (Ohio State)
- Joanna Bernabei (West Liberty)

Legend

- (C) Team captain
- (S) Suspended
- (I) Ineligible
- (W) Walk-on
- Injured
- Current redshirt

Roster

== Schedule and results ==
Date time, TV	Rank^{#}	Opponent^{#}	Result	Record	High points	High rebounds	High assists	Site city, state
Non-Conference Regular Season
November 18, 2005*	No. 14	at Siena	W 107–66	1–0	23 – Doron	10 – Langhorne	7 – Doron	Alumni Recreation Center (3,780); Loudonville, New York
November 20, 2005*	No. 14	Xavier	W 93–68	2–0	23 – Doron	7 – Tied	7 – Toliver	Comcast Center (3,102); College Park, Maryland
November 24, 2005*	No. 10	vs. Gonzaga; Paradise Jam – Round Robin Game 1	W 88–50	3–0	21 – Coleman	11 – Perry	5 – Toliver	Sports and Fitness Center (2,879); St. Thomas, U.S. Virgin Islands
November 25, 2005*	No. 10	vs. No. 9 Michigan State; Paradise Jam – Round Robin Game 2	W 75–71	4–0	16 – Doron	12 – Langhorne	6 – Doron	Sports and Fitness Center; St. Thomas, U.S. Virgin Islands
November 26, 2005*	No. 10	vs. No. 2 Tennessee; Paradise Jam – Championship Game	L 75–80	4–1	19 – Langhorne	12 – Harper	4 – Harper	Sports and Fitness Center (2,940); St. Thomas, U.S. Virgin Islands
December 01, 2005*	No. 9	Appalachian State	W 118–59	5–1	20 – Doron	16 – Perry	11 – Toliver	Comcast Center (2,354); College Park, Maryland
December 04, 2005*	No. 9	Mount St. Mary's	W 102–53	6–1	30 – Langhorne	13 – Perry	6 – Doron	Comcast Center (2,712); College Park, Maryland
December 07, 2005*	No. 9	at Monmouth	W 88–55	7–1	22 – Coleman	11 – Perry	10 – Doron	Boylan Gymnasium (1,012); West Long Branch, New Jersey
December 11, 2005*	No. 9	Arizona	W 97–62	8–1	20 – Coleman	11 – Langhorne	13 – Doron	Comcast Center (4,018); College Park, Maryland
December 13, 2005*	No. 8	Coppin State	W 69–38	9–1	13 – Coleman	10 – Langhorne	3 – Coleman	Comcast Center (2,384); College Park, Maryland
December 22, 2005*	No. 6	at George Mason	W 70–33	10–1	21 – Newman	10 – Harper	7 – Doron	Patriot Center (1,215); Fairfax, Virginia
December 29, 2005*	No. 6	Central Connecticut; Terrapin Classic – Semifinals	W 94–57	11–1	26 – Doron	10 – Langhorne	6 – Coleman	Comcast Center (3,085); College Park, Maryland
December 30, 2005	No. 6	Furman; Terrapin Classic – Finals	W 92–58	12–1	26 – Doron	10 – Tied	6 – Doron	Comcast Center (2,763); College Park, Maryland
January 02, 2006*	No. 6	Manhattan	W 82–49	13–1	17 – Perry	10 – Perry	5 – Doron	Comcast Center (2,763); College Park, Maryland
ACC Regular Season
January 05, 2006	No. 6	at No. 19 Boston College	W 67–64 ^{OT}	14–1 (1–0)	24 – Langhorne	13 – Langhorne	3 – Tied	Conte Forum (1,280); Chestnut Hill, Massachusetts
January 08, 2006; 1:00 pm, CSN	No. 6	No. 2 Duke	L 68–86	14–2 (1–1)	12 – Tied	6 – Tied	7 – Doron	Comcast Center (16,097); College Park, Maryland
January 16, 2006; 4:30 pm, CSN	No. 6	Florida State	W 75–57	15–2 (2–1)	16 – Toliver	14 – Langhorne	4 – Tied	Comcast Center (7,194); College Park, Maryland
January 20, 2006; 7:00 pm, CSN	No. 6	at Virginia	W 84–74 ^{OT}	16–2 (3–1)	22 – Coleman	9 – Harper	10 – Toliver	University Hall (4,233); Charlottesville, Virginia
January 23, 2006; 7:00 pm, CSN	No. 6	at No. 25 Virginia Tech	W 68–62	17–2 (4–1)	21 – Langhorne	12 – Langhorne	3 – Perry	Cassell Coliseum (3,984); Blacksburg, Virginia
January 26, 2006	No. 6	Georgia Tech	W 79–71	18–2 (5–1)	23 – Langhorne	10 – Coleman	6 – Newman	Comcast Center (2,796); College Park, Maryland
January 29, 2006	No. 6	at Wake Forest	W 79–70 ^{OT}	19–2 (6–1)	34 – Langhorne	14 – Langhorne	4 – Newman	LJVM Coliseum (2,405); Winston-Salem, North Carolina
February 01, 2006	No. 6	Miami (FL)	W 88–77	20–2 (7–1)	26 – Doron	12 – Tied	4 – Tied	Comcast Center (3,080); College Park, Maryland
February 06, 2006	No. 6	Virginia	W 85–71	21–2 (8–1)	23 – Doron	10 – Harper	9 – Toliver	Comcast Center (9,099); College Park, Maryland
February 09, 2006	No. 6	at No. 1 North Carolina	W 98–95 ^{OT}	22–2 (9–1)	25 – Langhorne	9 – Coleman	8 – Toliver	Carmichael Auditorium (6,417); Chapel Hill, North Carolina
February 13, 2006; 7:00 pm, ESPN2	No. 6	at No. 1 Duke	L 80–90	22–3 (9–2)	20 – Coleman	7 – Harper	4 – Toliver	Cameron Indoor Stadium (6,047); Durham, North Carolina
February 16, 2006	No. 4	No. 18 Boston College	W 86–59	23–3 (10–2)	22 – Doron	15 – Coleman	7 – Toliver	Comcast Center (5,250); College Park, Maryland
February 19, 2006; 1:00 pm, FSN South	No. 4	at NC State	W 65–57	24–3 (11–2)	20 – Harper	10 – Coleman	9 – Doron	Reynolds Coliseum (7,781); Raleigh, North Carolina
February 23, 2006	No. 4	Clemson	W 89–63	25–3 (12–2)	20 – Coleman	10 – Tied	5 – Tied	Comcast Center (4,954); College Park, Maryland
February 26, 2006*	No. 4	Northern Colorado	W 89–53	26–3	17 – Toliver	10 – Coleman	7 – Coleman	Comcast Center (5,914); College Park, Maryland
ACC Tournament
March 03, 2006; 9:30 pm, CSN	(3) No. 4	(11) Georgia Tech; Quarterfinals	W 71–66	27–3	20 – Langhorne	7 – Langhorne	5 – Toliver	Greensboro Coliseum (8,965); Greensboro, North Carolina
March 04, 2006*; 4:00 pm, FSN	(3) No. 4	vs. (2) No. 2 Duke; Semifinals	W 78–70	28–3	17 – Harper	13 – Coleman	5 – Toliver	Greensboro Coliseum (10,019); Greensboro, North Carolina
March 05, 2006*; 1:00 pm, FSN	(3) No. 4	vs. (1) No. 1 North Carolina; Championship Game	L 80–91	28–4	18 – Perry	8 – Tied	4 – Toliver	Greensboro Coliseum (10,746); Greensboro, North Carolina
NCAA Tournament
March 19, 2006*; 2:30 pm, ESPN2	(2 ABQ) No. 3	vs. (15 ABQ) Sacred Heart; First Round	W 95–54	29–4	17 – Doron	13 – Harper	12 – Toliver	Bryce Jordan Center (3,990); State College, Pennsylvania
March 21, 2006*; 7:20 pm, ESPN2	(2 ABQ) No. 3	vs. (7 ABQ) St. John's; Second Round	W 81–74	30–4	30 – Langhorne	9 – Langhorne	8 – Toliver	Bryce Jordan Center; State College, Pennsylvania
March 25, 2006*; 9:00 pm, ESPN	(2 ABQ) No. 3	vs. (3 ABQ) No. 10 Baylor; Sweet Sixteen	W 82–63	31–4	34 – Langhorne	15 – Langhorne	5 – Doron	University Arena (7,122); Albuquerque, New Mexico
March 27, 2006*; 7:00 pm, ESPN	(2 ABQ) No. 3	vs. (5 ABQ) No. 18 Utah; Elite Eight	W 75–65 ^{OT}	32–4	28 – Toliver	11 – Tied	6 – Toliver	University Arena (6,823); Albuquerque, New Mexico
April 02, 2006*; 7:00 pm, ESPN	(2 ABQ) No. 3	vs. (1 CLE) No. 1 North Carolina; Final Four	W 81–70	33–4	24 – Harper	14 – Coleman	7 – Coleman	TD Banknorth Garden (18,642); Boston, Massachusetts
April 04, 2006*; 8:42 pm, ESPN	(2 ABQ) No. 3	vs. (1 BPT) No. 4 Duke; National Championship Game	W 78–75 ^{OT}	34–4	16 – Tied	14 – Coleman	4 – Tied	TD Banknorth Gaden (18,642); Boston, Massachusetts
*Non-conference game. ^{#}Rankings from AP Poll. (#) Tournament seedings in parentheses. All times are in Eastern Time. ABQ = Albuquerque, CLE = Cleveland, BPT = Bridgeport.

== Player statistics ==
Individual player statistics (Final)
			Minutes		Scoring		Total FGs			3-point FGs			Free-Throws			Rebounds							
Player	GP	GS	Tot	Avg	Pts	Avg	FG	FGA	Pct	3FG	3FA	Pct	FT	FTA	Pct	Off	Def	Tot	Avg	A	Stl	Blk	TO
Carr, Charmaine	37	2	395	10.7	67	1.8	24	54	.444	0	1	.000	19	31	.613	31	39	70	1.9	22	4	11	18
Coleman, Marissa	37	28	1155	31.2	510	13.8	183	363	.504	54	115	.470	90	108	.833	71	228	299	8.1	115	48	52	115
Doron, Shay	38	35	1192	31.4	511	13.4	160	401	.399	56	146	.384	135	163	.828	27	116	143	3.8	149	67	11	118
Harper, Laura	36	17	799	22.2	413	11.5	144	269	.535	0	0	.000	125	183	.683	82	176	258	7.2	26	31	70	80
Langhorne, Crystal	38	38	1089	28.7	654	17.2	248	370	.670	0	1	.000	158	228	.693	131	194	325	8.6	77	27	14	98
Newman, Ashleigh	38	25	1032	27.2	292	7.7	103	276	.373	47	131	.359	38	53	.736	50	82	132	3.5	84	44	6	81
Noirez, Aurelie	31	0	319	10.3	79	2.5	34	70	.486	0	0	.000	11	17	.647	27	30	57	1.8	10	5	3	17
Perry, Jade	38	20	714	18.8	250	6.6	98	215	.456	0	0	.000	54	72	.750	83	102	165	4.3	21	16	17	51
Ross, Angel	14	1	103	7.4	6	0.4	2	16	.125	0	0	.000	2	5	.400	1	20	21	1.5	3	3	4	3
Toliver, Kristi	33	24	952	28.8	384	11.6	134	329	.407	59	146	.404	57	64	.891	17	70	87	2.6	145	23	7	97
TEAM																68	95	163	4.3				10
Total	38		7750		3166	83.3	1130	2363	.478	216	540	.400	690	924	.747	568	1152	1720	45.3	652	268	195	688
Opponents	38		7750		2471	65.0	920	2470	.372	189	615	.307	442	633	.698	488	779	1267	33.3	494	332	114	612

Legend
GP	Games played	GS	Games started	Avg	Average per game
FG	Field-goals made	FGA	Field-goal attempts	Off	Offensive rebounds
Def	Defensive rebounds	A	Assists	TO	Turnovers
Blk	Blocks	Stl	Steals

== Awards and honors ==
- Laura Harper, Tournament Most Outstanding Player

== Team players drafted into the WNBA ==
- Marissa Coleman was selected second overall in the 2009 WNBA draft.
- Shay Doron was selected in the second round (16th overall) of the 2007 WNBA draft.
- Laura Harper was selected in the first round (10th overall) of the 2008 WNBA draft.
- Crystal Langhorne was selected in the first round (sixth overall) of the 2008 WNBA draft.
- Kristi Toliver was selected third overall in the 2009 WNBA draft.

== See also ==
- List of Atlantic Coast Conference women's basketball regular season champions
- List of Atlantic Coast Conference women's basketball tournament champions
