= 2005–06 North Carolina Tar Heels women's basketball team =

Intercollegiate basketball season

2005–06 North Carolina Tar Heels women's basketball

ACC Tournament Champions

NCAA Tournament, Final Four
- Conference: Atlantic Coast Conference

Ranking
- Coaches: No. 3
- AP: No. 1
- Record: 34–4 (11–3 ACC)
- Head coach: Sylvia Hatchell
- Assistant coaches: Andrew Calder; Tracey Williams-Johnson; Charlotte Smith
- Home arena: Carmichael Auditorium

2005–06 ACC women's basketball standings
	Conf.				Overall
Team	W		L	PCT	W		L	PCT
No. 1 North Carolina †	13	–	1	.929	33	–	2	.943
No. 3 Maryland	12	–	2	.857	34	–	4	.895
No. 4 Duke	12	–	2	.857	31	–	4	.886
Florida State	10	–	4	.714	20	–	10	.667
NC State	7	–	7	.500	19	–	12	.613
Virginia Tech	6	–	8	.429	21	–	10	.677
Boston College	6	–	8	.429	21	–	12	.636
Miami (FL)	6	–	8	.429	17	–	13	.567
Virginia	5	–	9	.357	20	–	12	.625
Wake Forest	3	–	11	.214	12	–	16	.429
Georgia Tech	2	–	12	.143	14	–	15	.483
Clemson	2	–	12	.143	8	–	21	.276
† 2006 ACC tournament winner Rankings from AP poll

The 2005–06 North Carolina Tar Heels Women's Basketball Team represented the University of North Carolina as a member of the Atlantic Coast Conference during the 2005–06 NCAA Division I women's basketball season. Led by head coach Sylvia Hatchell, the Tar Heels played their home games at Carmichael Auditorium in Chapel Hill, North Carolina. The Tar Heels won the ACC regular season and tournament titles. UNC was one of three ACC schools to play in the 2006 Final Four, joining Duke and Maryland.

== Roster ==
2005–06 North Carolina Tar Heels women's basketball team
Players
Coaches

Pos.	#	Name	Height	Year	Hometown
G		Ivory Latta	5 ft 6 in (1.68 m)	Jr	York, SC
F		Camille Little	6 ft 2 in (1.88 m)	Jr	Winston-Salem, NC

Head coach

- Sylvia Hatchell

Assistant coach(es)

Legend

- (C) Team captain
- (S) Suspended
- (I) Ineligible
- (W) Walk-on
- Injured
- Current redshirt

== Schedule and results ==
Date time, TV	Rank^{#}	Opponent^{#}	Result	Record	Site city, state
Exhibition
Nov 3, 2005*; 7:00 p.m.		Premier Players	W 96–85		Carmichael Auditorium; Chapel Hill, North Carolina
Nov 8, 2005*; 7:00 p.m.		Athletes in Action	W 80–57		Carmichael Auditorium; Chapel Hill, North Carolina
Regular season
Nov 18, 2005*; 7:00 p.m.	No. 7	Davidson	W 86–48	1–0	Carmichael Auditorium; Chapel Hill, North Carolina
Nov 21, 2005*; 7:00 p.m.	No. 7	Liberty	W 87–36	2–0	Carmichael Auditorium; Chapel Hill, North Carolina
Nov 25, 2005*; 2:40 p.m.		vs. Arizona State; Caribbean Classic	W 79–72	3–0	Cancun, Mexico
Nov 26, 2005*; 5:10 p.m.		vs. TCU; Caribbean Classic	W 77–54	4–0	Cancun, Mexico
Nov 29, 2005*; 6:00 p.m.		UNC Asheville	W 83–43	5–0	Carmichael Auditorium; Chapel Hill, North Carolina
Dec 1, 2005*; 7:00 p.m.		Charleston Southern	W 92–38	6–0	Carmichael Auditorium; Chapel Hill, North Carolina
Dec 2, 2005*; 7:00 p.m.		South Florida	W 71–47	7–0	Carmichael Auditorium; Chapel Hill, North Carolina
Dec 5, 2005*; 7:30 p.m.	No. 7	at No. 8 Connecticut; Jimmy V Classic	W 77–54	8–0	Hartford Civic Center; Hartford, Connecticut
Dec 8, 2005*; 7:00 p.m.		Wofford	W 87–50	9–0	Carmichael Auditorium; Chapel Hill, North Carolina
Dec 17, 2005*; 2:00 p.m.		Coastal Carolina	W 98–41	10–0	Carmichael Auditorium; Chapel Hill, North Carolina
Dec 20, 2005*; 7:00 p.m.		vs. Vanderbilt	W 87–67	11–0	Myrtle Beach, South Carolina
Dec 29, 2005*; 7:00 p.m.		at Old Dominion	W 88–80 ^{OT}	12–0	Norfolk, Virginia
Dec 31, 2005*; 2:00 p.m.		College of Charleston	W 101–48	13–0	Carmichael Auditorium; Chapel Hill, North Carolina
Jan 6, 2006; 7:00 p.m.	No. 5	Clemson	W 102–61	14–0 (1–0)	Carmichael Auditorium; Chapel Hill, North Carolina
Jan 9, 2006; 7:00 p.m.		at Miami (FL)	W 90–57	15–0 (2–0)	Coral Gables, Florida
Jan 15, 2006; 5:00 p.m.		at NC State	W 65–53	16–0 (3–0)	Raleigh, North Carolina
Jan 18, 2006; 7:00 p.m.		Georgia Tech	W 85–56	17–0 (4–0)	Carmichael Auditorium; Chapel Hill, North Carolina
Jan 22, 2006; 2:00 p.m.		Florida State	W 68–51	18–0 (5–0)	Carmichael Auditorium; Chapel Hill, North Carolina
Jan 27, 2006; 7:00 p.m.		at Wake Forest	W 91–57	19–0 (6–0)	Winston-Salem, North Carolina
Jan 29, 2006; 7:00 p.m.	No. 3	at No. 2 Duke	W 74–70	20–0 (7–0)	Cameron Indoor Stadium; Durham, North Carolina
Feb 2, 2006; 7:00 p.m.		NC State	W 75–58	21–0 (8–0)	Carmichael Auditorium; Chapel Hill, North Carolina
Feb 5, 2006; 2:00 p.m.		Georgia Tech	W 75–56	22–0 (9–0)	Carmichael Auditorium; Chapel Hill, North Carolina
Feb 9, 2006; 7:00 p.m.	No. 1	No. 6 Maryland	L 95–98 ^{OT}	22–1 (9–1)	Carmichael Auditorium; Chapel Hill, North Carolina
Feb 12, 2006; 5:25 p.m.		at Virginia	W 72–60	23–1 (10–1)	Charlottesville, Virginia
Feb 17, 2006; 6:30 p.m.		at Virginia Tech	W 84–75	24–1 (11–1)	Blacksburg, Virginia
Feb 20, 2006; 7:00 p.m.	No. 2	Boston College	W 69–62	25–1 (12–1)	Carmichael Auditorium; Chapel Hill, North Carolina
Feb 25, 2006; 2:00 p.m.	No. 2	No. 1 Duke	W 77–65	26–1 (13–1)	Carmichael Auditorium; Chapel Hill, North Carolina
ACC Tournament
Mar 3, 2006*; 11:00 a.m.	No. 1	vs. Virginia; Quarterfinals	W 82–56	27–1	Greensboro Coliseum; Greensboro, NC
Mar 4, 2006*; 1:30 p.m.	No. 1	vs. NC State; Semifinals	W 90–69	28–1	Greensboro Coliseum; Greensboro, NC
Mar 5, 2006*; 1:00 p.m.	No. 1	vs. No. 4 Maryland; Championship game	W 91–80	29–1	Greensboro Coliseum (10,746); Greensboro, NC
NCAA Tournament
Mar 18, 2006*; 8:00 p.m.	(1 CLE) No. 1	vs. (16 CLE) UC Riverside; First round	W 75–51	30–1	Memorial Gymnasium; Nashville, Tennessee
Mar 20, 2006*; 7:00 p.m.	(1 CLE) No. 1	at (8 CLE) Vanderbilt; Second round	W 89–70	31–1	Memorial Gymnasium; Nashville, Tennessee
Mar 26, 2006*; 2:30 p.m.	(1 CLE) No. 1	vs. (4 CLE) No. 11 Purdue; Regional Semifinal – Sweet Sixteen	W 70–68	32–1	Quicken Loans Arena; Cleveland, Ohio
Mar 28, 2006*; 7:00 p.m.	(1 CLE) No. 1	vs. (2 CLE) No. 6 Tennessee; Regional Final – Elite Eight	W 75–63	33–1	Quicken Loans Arena; Cleveland, Ohio
Apr 2, 2006*; 7:00 p.m.	(1 CLE) No. 1	vs. (2 ABQ) No. 3 Maryland; National Semifinal – Final Four	L 70–81	33–2	TD Garden; Boston, Massachusetts
*Non-conference game. ^{#}Rankings from Coaches' Poll. (#) Tournament seedings in parentheses. All times are in Eastern Time.

== Rankings ==
Ranking movements Legend: ██ Increase in ranking ██ Decrease in ranking
	Week																		
Poll	Pre	1	2	3	4	5	6	7	8	9	10	11	12	13	14	15	16	17	Final
AP	7	7	7	7	6	5	5	5	4	4	3	1	1	3	2	1	1	1	Not released
Coaches	8	8	8	6	6	5	5	5	4	3	2	1	1	2	2	1	1	1	3
