= 2005–06 Duke Blue Devils women's basketball team =

2005–06 Duke Blue Devils women's basketball season

2005–06 Duke Blue Devils women's basketball

NCAA tournament, Runner-up
- Conference: Atlantic Coast Conference

Ranking
- Coaches: No. 2
- AP: No. 4
- Record: 31–4 (12–2 ACC)
- Head coach: Gail Goestenkors (14th season)
- Assistant coaches: Tia Jackson (1st season); Shannon Perry; Gale Valley
- Home arena: Cameron Indoor Stadium

2005–06 ACC women's basketball standings
	Conf.				Overall
Team	W		L	PCT	W		L	PCT
No. 1 North Carolina †	13	–	1	.929	33	–	2	.943
No. 3 Maryland	12	–	2	.857	34	–	4	.895
No. 4 Duke	12	–	2	.857	31	–	4	.886
Florida State	10	–	4	.714	20	–	10	.667
NC State	7	–	7	.500	19	–	12	.613
Virginia Tech	6	–	8	.429	21	–	10	.677
Boston College	6	–	8	.429	21	–	12	.636
Miami (FL)	6	–	8	.429	17	–	13	.567
Virginia	5	–	9	.357	20	–	12	.625
Wake Forest	3	–	11	.214	12	–	16	.429
Georgia Tech	2	–	12	.143	14	–	15	.483
Clemson	2	–	12	.143	8	–	21	.276
† 2006 ACC tournament winner Rankings from AP poll

The 2005–06 Duke Blue Devils women's basketball team represented Duke University during the 2005–06 NCAA Division I women's basketball season. The team was led by head coach Gail Goestenkors in her 14th season at the school, and played its home games at Cameron Indoor Stadium in Durham, North Carolina as members of the Atlantic Coast Conference. They finished the season 31–4, 12–2 in ACC play to finish second in the regular season conference standings. They were defeated in the ACC tournament but received an at-large bid to the NCAA tournament. Playing as No. 1 seed in the Bridgeport region (East), the Blue Devils defeated Southern, USC, Michigan State, and UConn to reach the Final Four for the third time in five years. Duke was one of three ACC schools to play in the 2006 Final Four, joining North Carolina and Maryland. In the National semifinal round, the Blue Devils easily defeated LSU to advance to the National championship game where the team was beaten by conference foe Maryland, 78–75 in overtime.

== Roster ==
2005–06 Duke Blue Devils women's basketball team
Players
Coaches

Pos.	#	Name	Height	Year	Previous school	Hometown
F	1	Mistie Williams	6 ft 3 in (1.91 m)	Sr	George S. Parker	Janesville, WI
G	2	Emily Waner	5 ft 8 in (1.73 m)	So	ThunderRidge	Highlands Ranch, CO
G/F	3	Laura Kurz	6 ft 1 in (1.85 m)	So	Germantown Academy	Lower Gwynedd, PA
G	4	Abby Waner	5 ft 10 in (1.78 m)	Fr	ThunderRidge	Highlands Ranch, CO
G	10	Lindsey Harding	5 ft 8 in (1.73 m)	Sr	Cy-Fair	Houston, TX
C	11	Chante Black	6 ft 5 in (1.96 m)	So	East Forsyth	Winston-Salem, NC
G/F	22	Brittany Mitch	6 ft 2 in (1.88 m)	Fr	St. John's	McLean, VA
G	23	Wanisha Smith	5 ft 11 in (1.8 m)	So	Riverdale Baptist	Upper Marlboro, MD
G	24	Jessica Foley	6 ft 0 in (1.83 m)	Sr	AIS
G/F	25	Monique Currie	6 ft 0 in (1.83 m)	Sr	Bullis School	Washington, D.C.
F	30	Carrem Gay	6 ft 2 in (1.88 m)	Fr	Christ The King	New York, NY
G/F	31	Keturah Jackson	6 ft 0 in (1.83 m)	Fr	Dreher	Columbia, SC
C	43	Alison Bales	6 ft 7 in (2.01 m)	Jr	Beavercreek	Dayton, OH

Head coach

- Gail Goestenkors (Saginaw Valley State)

Assistant coach(es)

Legend

- (C) Team captain
- (S) Suspended
- (I) Ineligible
- (W) Walk-on
- Injured
- Current redshirt

Roster

== Schedule ==
Date time, TV	Rank^{#}	Opponent^{#}	Result	Record	Site (attendance) city, state
Regular season
Nov 18, 2005*	No. 1	at Penn State	W 93–67	1–0	Bryce Jordan Center; University Park, PA
Nov 20, 2005*	No. 1	at Old Dominion	W 93–56	2–0	Ted Constant Convocation Center; Norfolk, VA
Nov 22, 2005*	No. 1	Fairfield	W 110–44	3–0	Cameron Indoor Stadium; Durham, NC
Nov 26, 2005*	No. 1	Arkansas State; Duke Classic	W 110–56	4–0	Cameron Indoor Stadium; Durham, NC
Nov 27, 2005*	No. 1	Auburn; Duke Classic	W 69–37	5–0	Cameron Indoor Stadium; Durham, NC
Dec 4, 2005*	No. 1	at No. 16 Texas	W 84–70	6–0	Frank Erwin Center; Austin, TX
Dec 6, 2005*	No. 2	at TCU	W 92–52	7–0	Daniel–Meyer Coliseum; Fort Worth, TX
Dec 19, 2005*	No. 2	Ball State	W 110–24	8–0	Cameron Indoor Stadium; Durham, NC
Dec 22, 2005*	No. 2	Colorado State	W 99–52	9–0	Cameron Indoor Stadium; Durham, NC
Dec 28, 2005*	No. 2	vs. St. John's; San Diego Surf'N Slam Classic	W 105–57	10–0	San Diego, CA
Dec 30, 2005*	No. 2	at San Diego; San Diego Surf'N Slam Classic	W 119–52	11–0	San Diego, CA
Jan 2, 2006	No. 2	Wake Forest	W 100–54	12–0 (1–0)	Cameron Indoor Stadium; Durham, NC
Jan 5, 2006	No. 2	Florida State	W 87–68	13–0 (2–0)	Cameron Indoor Stadium; Durham, NC
Jan 8, 2006	No. 2	at No. 6 Maryland	W 86–68	14–0 (3–0)	Comcast Center; College Park, MD
Jan 11, 2006	No. 2	at Georgia Tech	W 67–59	15–0 (4–0)	Alexander Memorial Coliseum; Atlanta, GA
Jan 14, 2006	No. 2	at Boston College	W 66–52	16–0 (5–0)	Conte Forum; Chestnut Hill, MA
Jan 16, 2006*	No. 2	at Holy Cross	W 84–36	17–0	Hart Center; Worcester, MA
Jan 19, 2006	No. 2	NC State	W 77–57	18–0 (6–0)	Cameron Indoor Stadium; Durham, NC
Jan 23, 2006*	No. 2	No. 1 Tennessee	W 75–53	19–0	Cameron Indoor Stadium; Durham, NC
Jan 26, 2006	No. 2	at Clemson	W 97–56	20–0 (7–0)	Littlejohn Coliseum; Clemson, SC
Jan 29, 2006	No. 2	No. 3 North Carolina	L 70–74	20–1 (7–1)	Cameron Indoor Stadium; Durham, NC
Feb 6, 2006	No. 2	at Virginia Tech	W 73–62	21–1 (8–1)	Cassell Coliseum; Blacksburg, VA
Feb 10, 2006	No. 2	Virginia	W 88–65	22–1 (9–1)	Cameron Indoor Stadium; Durham, NC
Feb 13, 2006	No. 1	No. 4 Maryland	W 90–80	23–1 (10–1)	Cameron Indoor Stadium; Durham, NC
Feb 19, 2006	No. 1	at Miami (FL)	W 99–93	24–1 (11–1)	University of Miami Convocation Center; Coral Gables, FL
Feb 22, 2006	No. 1	Virginia Tech	W 93–51	25–1 (12–1)	Cameron Indoor Stadium; Durham, NC
Feb 25, 2006	No. 1	No. 2 North Carolina	L 65–77	25–2 (12–2)	Carmichael Auditorium; Chapel Hill, NC
ACC tournament
Mar 3, 2006*	No. 2	vs. Virginia Tech; Quarterfinals	W 69–56	26–2	Greensboro Coliseum; Greensboro, NC
Mar 4, 2006*	No. 2	vs. No. 4 Maryland; Semifinals	L 70–78	26–3	Greensboro Coliseum; Greensboro, NC
NCAA tournament
Mar 19, 2006*	(1 BPT) No. 4	vs. (16 BPT) Southern; First round	W 96–27	27–3	Ted Constant Convocation Center; Norfolk, VA
Mar 21, 2006*	(1 BPT) No. 4	vs. (8 BPT) Michigan State; Second round	W 85–51	28–3	Ted Constant Convocation Center; Norfolk, VA
Mar 26, 2006*	(1 BPT) No. 4	vs. (4 BPT) No. 16 Michigan State; Regional Semifinal – Sweet Sixteen	W 86–61	29–3	Bridgeport Arena at Harbor Yard; Bridgeport, CT
Mar 28, 2006*	(1 BPT) No. 4	vs. (2 BPT) No. 8 Connecticut; Regional Final – Elite Eight	W 63–61 ^{OT}	30–3	Bridgeport Arena at Harbor Yard; Bridgeport, CT
Apr 2, 2006*	(1 BPT) No. 4	vs. (1 SAN) No. 5 LSU; National Semifinal – Final Four	W 64–45	31–3	TD Garden; Boston, Massachusetts
Apr 4, 2006*	(1 BPT) No. 4	vs. (2 ABQ) No. 3 Maryland; National Championship	L 75–78 ^{OT}	31–4	TD Garden; Boston, Massachusetts
*Non-conference game. ^{#}Rankings from AP Poll,. (#) Tournament seedings in parentheses. All times are in Eastern Time.

== Rankings ==
Ranking movements Legend: ██ Increase in ranking ██ Decrease in ranking
	Week																		
Poll	Pre	1	2	3	4	5	6	7	8	9	10	11	12	13	14	15	16	17	Final
AP	1	1	1	2	2	2	2	2	2	2	2	2	2	1	1	2	4	4	Not released
Coaches	2	2	2	2	2	2	2	2	2	2	1	2	2	1	1	2	4	4	2

== See also ==
- 2005-06 Duke Blue Devils men's basketball team
