= Cathy Inglese =

American basketball coach (1958–2019)

Biographical details
- Born: December 16, 1958; Wallingford, Connecticut, U.S.
- Died: July 24, 2019 (aged 60); Manhasset, New York, U.S.

Playing career
- 1976–1980: Southern Connecticut
- Position: Guard / Forward

Coaching career (HC unless noted)
- 1980–1983: Glastonbury HS
- 1983–1986: New Hampshire (assistant)
- 1986–1993: Vermont
- 1993–2008: Boston College
- 2009–2014: Rhode Island
- 2017–2019: Fairleigh Dickinson (associate)
- 2019: Hofstra (assistant)

Accomplishments and honors

Awards
- Big East Coach of the Year (1999); 3× NAC Coach of the Year (1991–1993)

Catherine Mary Inglese (December 16, 1958 – July 24, 2019) was an American college basketball coach who served as the head coach for women's basketball programs for a total of 27 years, at the University of Vermont, Boston College, and the University of Rhode Island.

== Collegiate coaching ==
In 1983, Inglese became assistant basketball coach at the University of New Hampshire, a position she held for three years.

Inglese served as the head coach of the Vermont Catamounts women's basketball team at the University of Vermont for seven seasons, starting in 1986. She put together a string of 57 consecutive regular season wins over two seasons going 29–0 in 1992, and 28–0 in 1993. She posted a 120–74 overall record at Vermont.

Inglese was the head women's basketball coach for the Boston College Eagles women's basketball team at Boston College from May 1993 until April 2008. She posted eight 20-win seasons with the Eagles, with seven NCAA tournament appearances, including three trips to the "Sweet 16" (round-of-16). In 2004, the Eagles won a school record 27 games, capturing their first-ever Big East championship. Her team defeated number one seed Ohio State in the 2006 NCAA tournament. Inglese resigned her position at Boston College in April 2008, following a second-round exit from the ACC women's basketball tournament and a third-round exit from the Women's National Invitation Tournament (WNIT). Her overall record at Boston College was 273–129 (.604) in 15 seasons.

In April 2009, Inglese became head coach of the Rhode Island Rams women's basketball team at the University of Rhode Island. She coached the team for five seasons, compiling a record of 30–115 (.207). In March 2014, her contract was not renewed.

Inglese later worked at Fairleigh Dickinson University for two seasons (2017–18 and 2018–19), then was hired as an assistant coach at Hofstra University in June 2019.

== USA Basketball ==
Medal record

Women's basketball

Assistant coach for United States

Universiade
Gold medal – first place	İzmir 2005	Team

Inglese served as an assistant coach of the USA women's basketball team at the World University Games (also known as the Universiade) held in İzmir, Turkey, in August 2005, under head coach Kathy Delaney-Smith of Harvard. The US team played their first game against the Czech Republic and won, 88–64, with the 24-point margin in that contest being the closest any team would come to beating the US. The team then defeated South Africa, China, and Poland to advance to the quarterfinals. They then beat Chinese Taipei and Russia, each by more than 50 points, to advance to the title game with Serbia & Montenegro. The US won the championship, 79–63, finishing with a 7–0 record and winning the gold medal.

== Head coaching record ==
Record table
Season	Team	Overall	Conference	Standing	Postseason
Vermont Catamounts (North Atlantic Conference) (1986–1993)
1986–87	Vermont	13–14	6–8	4th	
1987–88	Vermont	8–18	4–10	T-5th	
1988–89	Vermont	7–18	5–9	6th	
1989–90	Vermont	13–5	6–6	4th	
1990–91	Vermont	22–7	8–2	2nd	
1991–92	Vermont	29–1	14–0	1st	NCAA first round
1992–93	Vermont	28–1	14–0	1st	NCAA first round
Vermont:		120–74 (.619)	57–35 (.620)		
Boston College Eagles (Big East Conference) (1993–2005)
1993–94	Boston College	13–14	9–9	5th	
1994–95	Boston College	6–21	3–15	10th	
1995–96	Boston College	10–17	7–11	T-4th (BE 6)	
1996–97	Boston College	18–10	13–5	3rd (BE 6)	
1997–98	Boston College	17–11	11–7	4th (BE 6)	
1998–99	Boston College	22–8	12–6	4th	NCAA second round
1999–2000	Boston College	26–9	12–4	T-3rd	NCAA second round
2000–01	Boston College	14–15	7–9	7th	
2001–02	Boston College	23–8	12–4	T-3rd	NCAA first round
2002–03	Boston College	22–9	12–4	T-3rd	NCAA Sweet Sixteen
2003–04	Boston College	27–7	11–5	T-4th	NCAA first round
2004–05	Boston College	20–10	10–6	T-4th	NCAA second round
Boston College Eagles (Atlantic Coast Conference) (2005–2008)
2005–06	Boston College	21–12	6–8	T-6th	NCAA Sweet Sixteen
2006–07	Boston College	13–16	3–11	10th	
2007–08	Boston College	21–12	7–7	T-5th	WNIT Sweet Sixteen
Boston College:		273–129 (.679)	119–85 Big East; 16–26 ACC		
Rhode Island Rams (Atlantic 10 Conference) (2009–2014)
2009–10	Rhode Island	9–20	2–12	T-12th	
2010–11	Rhode Island	7–21	1–13	T-13th	
2011–12	Rhode Island	1–28	0–14	14th	
2012–13	Rhode Island	6–23	1–13	T-15th	
2013–14	Rhode Island	7–23	2–14	11th	
Rhode Island:		30–115 (.207)	6–66 (.083)		
Total:		423–318 (.571)			
National champion Postseason invitational champion Conference regular season champion Conference regular season and conference tournament champion Division regular season champion Division regular season and conference tournament champion Conference tournament champion

== Coaching honors ==
- District I Coach of the Year (1991, 1992, 1993)
- National coach of the Year Finalist (1991, 1992, 1993)
- North Atlantic Conference Coach of the Year (1991, 1992, 1993)
- Big East Conference Coach of the Year (1999)
- New England Division I Coach of the Year (2004)

== Personal life ==
Inglese graduated magna cum laude from Southern Connecticut State University in 1980, and later earned a master of education in counseling from the University of New Hampshire in 1987.

She was an inductee of several halls of fame, including at Southern Connecticut State University, the University of Vermont, and Boston College.

Inglese suffered a traumatic brain injury in an apparent fall in a stairwell sustained on July 17, 2019. She later underwent surgery at North Shore University Hospital in Manhasset, New York. Inglese died from her injuries on July 24, 2019, at age 60.
