= 2005–06 Connecticut Huskies women's basketball team =

Intercollegiate basketball season

2005–06 Connecticut Huskies women's basketball

Big East tournament champions

NCAA tournament, Elite Eight
- Conference: Big East Conference

Ranking
- Coaches: No. 8
- AP: No. 8
- Record: 32–5 (14–2 Big East)
- Head coach: Geno Auriemma
- Associate head coach: Chris Dailey
- Assistant coach: Jamelle Elliott
- Home arena: Harry A. Gampel Pavilion

2005–06 Big East Conference women's basketball standings
	Conf.				Overall
Team	W		L	PCT	W		L	PCT
No. 9 Rutgers	16	–	0	1.000	27	–	5	.844
No. 8 Connecticut †	14	–	2	.875	32	–	5	.865
No. 13 DePaul	11	–	5	.688	27	–	7	.794
St. John's	11	–	5	.688	22	–	8	.733
Louisville	10	–	6	.625	19	–	10	.655
Marquette	9	–	7	.563	22	–	11	.667
Pittsburgh	9	–	7	.563	22	–	11	.667
Villanova	9	–	7	.563	21	–	11	.656
South Florida	9	–	7	.563	19	–	12	.613
Notre Dame	8	–	8	.500	18	–	12	.600
Cincinnati	7	–	9	.438	17	–	12	.586
West Virginia	4	–	12	.250	15	–	16	.484
Georgetown	3	–	13	.188	10	–	17	.370
Providence	3	–	13	.188	8	–	19	.296
Seton Hall	3	–	13	.188	6	–	21	.222
Syracuse	2	–	14	.125	9	–	18	.333
† 2006 Big East Tournament winner Rankings from AP poll

The 2005–06 Connecticut Huskies women's basketball team represented the University of Connecticut in the 2005–06 NCAA Division I women's basketball season. Coached by Geno Auriemma, the Huskies played their home games at the Hartford Civic Center in Hartford, Connecticut, and on campus at the Harry A. Gampel Pavilion in Storrs, Connecticut, and were a member of the Big East Conference. They returned the Elite Eight of the NCAA tournament, and finished the season 32–5 (14–2 Big East).

== Roster ==
2005–06 Connecticut Huskies women's basketball team
Players
Coaches

Pos.	#	Name	Height	Year	Previous school	Hometown
G	2	Tahirah Williams	6 ft 0 in (1.83 m)	Fr	Immaculate Heart Academy	Montclair, New Jersey
G	20	Renee Montgomery	5 ft 7 in (1.7 m)	Fr	South Charleston	St. Albans, West Virginia
G	21	Nicole Wolff	6 ft 0 in (1.83 m)	Sr	Walpole	Walpole, Massachusetts
G	25	Mel Thomas	5 ft 9 in (1.75 m)	So	Mount Notre Dame	Cincinnati, Ohio
G/F	33	Barbara Turner	6 ft 0 in (1.83 m)	Sr	East Technical	Cleveland, Ohio
G	43	Ann Strother	6 ft 2 in (1.88 m)	Sr	Highlands Ranch	Castle Rock, Colorado
F/C	51	Cassie Kerns	6 ft 3 in (1.91 m)	Fr	Valparaiso	Valparaiso, Ind.

Head coach

Geno Auriemma

Assistant coach(es)

Chris Dailey
Jamelle Elliott

Legend

- (C) Team captain
- (S) Suspended
- (I) Ineligible
- (W) Walk-on
- Injured
- Current redshirt

Roster

== Schedule ==
Date time, TV	Rank^{#}	Opponent^{#}	Result	Record	Site (attendance) city, state
Regular season
Nov 12, 2005*	No. 9	Marist	W 71–45	1–0	Gampel Pavilion; Storrs, CT
Nov 14, 2005*	No. 9	Indiana State	W 86–43	2–0	Gampel Pavilion; Storrs, CT
Nov 17, 2005*	No. 9	Boston College	W 60–46	3–0	Gampel Pavilion; Storrs, CT
Nov 25, 2005*	No. 8	Oklahoma	W 82–60	4–0	Gampel Pavilion; Storrs, CT
Nov 27, 2005*	No. 8	at Cleveland State	W 85–51	5–0	Wolstein Center; Cleveland, OH
Dec 1, 2005*	No. 8	Hartford	W 72–47	6–0	Gampel Pavilion; Storrs, CT
Dec 5, 2005*	No. 8	No. 7 North Carolina; Jimmy V Classic	L 54–77	6–1	Hartford Civic Center; Hartford, CT
Dec 8, 2005	No. 8	at Villanova	W 72–56	7–1 (1–0)	Palestra; Philadelphia, PA
Dec 19, 2005*	No. 8	Holy Cross	W 81–54	8–1	Gampel Pavilion; Storrs, CT
Dec 22, 2005*	No. 8	Hofstra	W 86–49	9–1	Gampel Pavilion; Storrs, CT
Dec 29, 2005*	No. 8	Albany	W 78–44	10–1	Gampel Pavilion; Storrs, CT
Dec 31, 2005*	No. 8	Army	W 85–46	11–1	Gampel Pavilion; Storrs, CT
Jan 2, 2006	No. 7	Georgetown	W 80–38	12–1 (2–0)	Gampel Pavilion; Storrs, CT
Jan 7, 2006	No. 7	vs. No. 1 Tennessee	L 80–89	12–2	Gaylord Entertainment Center; Nashville, TN
Jan 10, 2006	No. 7	at Seton Hall	W 93–53	13–2 (3–0)	Walsh Gymnasium; South Orange, NJ
Jan 12, 2006	No. 7	Cincinnati	W 92–71	14–2 (4–0)	Gampel Pavilion; Storrs, CT
Jan 14, 2006	No. 7	St. John's	W 70–53	15–2 (5–0)	Gampel Pavilion; Storrs, CT
Jan 16, 2006*	No. 5	No. 3 LSU	W 51–48	16–2	Gampel Pavilion; Storrs, CT
Jan 21, 2006	No. 5	at Pittsburgh	W 65–54	17–2 (6–0)	Petersen Events Center; Pittsburgh, PA
Jan 24, 2006	No. 5	USF	W 77–47	18–2 (7–0)	Gampel Pavilion; Storrs, CT
Jan 28, 2006	No. 5	at No. 12 DePaul	W 84–75	19–2 (8–0)	McGrath-Phillips Arena; Chicago, IL
Jan 31, 2006	No. 4	at Louisville	W 75–68	20–2 (9–0)	Freedom Hall; Louisville, KY
Feb 4, 2006	No. 4	West Virginia	W 58–50	21–2 (10–0)	Gampel Pavilion; Storrs, CT
Feb 7, 2006	No. 4	No. 8 Rutgers	L 56–60	21–3 (10–1)	Gampel Pavilion; Storrs, CT
Feb 12, 2006	No. 4	Texas	W 71–58	22–3	Frank Erwin Center; Austin, TX
Feb 15, 2006	No. 8	Providence	W 84–58	23–3 (11–1)	Gampel Pavilion; Storrs, CT
Feb 19, 2006	No. 8	at Notre Dame	W 79–64	24–3 (12–1)	Joyce Center; Notre Dame, IN
Feb 22, 2006	No. 8	at Syracuse	W 65–36	25–3 (13–1)	Manley Field House; Syracuse, NY
Feb 25, 2006	No. 7	Marquette	W 74–59	26–3 (14–1)	Gampel Pavilion; Storrs, CT
Feb 27, 2006	No. 7	at No. 6 Rutgers	L 42–48	26–4 (14–2)	Louis Brown Athletic Center; Piscataway, NJ
Big East tournament
Mar 5, 2006*	No. 9	Notre Dame; Quarterfinals	W 71–60	27–4	Hartford Civic Center; Hartford, CT
Mar 6, 2006*	No. 9	No. 13 DePaul; Semifinals	W 69–57	28–4	Hartford Civic Center; Hartford, CT
Mar 7, 2006*	No. 9	West Virginia; Championship game	W 50–44	29–4	Hartford Civic Center; Hartford, CT
NCAA tournament
Mar 19, 2006*	(2 BPT) No. 8	vs. (15 BPT) Coppin State; First round	W 77–54	30–4	Bryce Jordan Center; State College, PA
Mar 21, 2006*	(2 BPT) No. 8	vs. (7 BPT) Virginia Tech; Second round	W 79–56	31–4	Bryce Jordan Center; State College, PA
Mar 26, 2006*	(2 BPT) No. 8	vs. (3 BPT) No. 12 Georgia; Regional Semifinal – Sweet Sixteen	W 77–75	32–4	Bridgeport Arena at Harbor Yard; Bridgeport, CT
Mar 28, 2006*	(2 BPT) No. 8	vs. (1 BPT) No. 4 Duke; Regional Final – Elite Eight	L 61–63 ^{OT}	32–5	Bridgeport Arena at Harbor Yard; Bridgeport, CT
*Non-conference game. ^{#}Rankings from AP Poll. (#) Tournament seedings in parentheses. FRS=Fresno Region. All times are in Eastern Time.

== Rankings ==
Ranking movements Legend: ██ Increase in ranking ██ Decrease in ranking т = Tied with team above or below
	Week																		
Poll	Pre	1	2	3	4	5	6	7	8	9	10	11	12	13	14	15	16	17	Final
AP	9	8	8	8	9	8	8	7	7	5	5	4	4	8	8	7	9	8	Not released
Coaches	7	7	6	6	9	9	8	8	7	7	5	4	3	3	6	6T	7	7	6

== See also ==
- 2005–06 Connecticut Huskies men's basketball team
