= 2005–06 LSU Lady Tigers basketball team =

Intercollegiate basketball season

2005–06 LSU Lady Tigers basketball

SEC Regular season champions

NCAA Women's Tournament, Final Four
- Conference: Southeastern Conference

Ranking
- Coaches: No. 4
- AP: No. 5
- Record: 31–4 (13–1 SEC)
- Head coach: Pokey Chatman (2nd season)
- Assistant coaches: Bob Starkey; Christie Sides; Carla Berry
- Home arena: Pete Maravich Assembly Center

2005–06 SEC women's basketball standings
	Conf.				Overall
Team	W		L	PCT	W		L	PCT
No. 5 LSU	13	–	1	.929	31	–	4	.886
No. 6 Tennessee^{†}	11	–	3	.786	31	–	5	.861
No. 12 Georgia	10	–	4	.714	23	–	9	.719
Kentucky	9	–	5	.643	22	–	9	.710
Florida	8	–	6	.571	21	–	9	.700
Vanderbilt	8	–	6	.571	21	–	11	.656
South Carolina	7	–	7	.500	17	–	12	.586
Ole Miss	5	–	9	.357	17	–	14	.548
Arkansas	5	–	9	.357	13	–	15	.464
Auburn	4	–	10	.286	14	–	15	.483
Alabama	3	–	11	.214	9	–	19	.321
Mississippi State	1	–	13	.071	6	–	22	.214
† 2006 SEC tournament winner Rankings from AP poll

The 2005–06 LSU Lady Tigers basketball team represented Louisiana State University during the 2005–06 NCAA Division I women's basketball season college basketball season. The Lady Tigers, were led by second-year head coach Pokey Chatman, played their home games at Pete Maravich Assembly Center, and were members of the Southeastern Conference. They finished the season 31–4, 13–1 in SEC play to finish atop the conference regular season standings. As the one seed in the SEC women's tournament, they lost in the championship game to Tennessee. They received an at-large bid to the NCAA women's tournament as the No. 1 seed in the San Antonio (SAN) region. The Lady Tigers defeated Florida Atlantic, Washington, DePaul, and Stanford to reach the Final Four for the third straight season. LSU was beaten in the National semifinals by Duke.

== Roster ==
2005–06 LSU Tigers women's basketball team
Players
Coaches

Pos.	#	Name	Height	Year	Previous school	Hometown
G	4	Katie Antony	5 ft 10 in (1.78 m)	So	Anacoco; Vanderbilt	Anacoco, LA
G	5	Erica White	5 ft 3 in (1.6 m)	So	Ribault	Jacksonville, FL
G	10	Khaliah Mitchell	5 ft 11 in (1.8 m)	So	St. Mary's	New Orleans, LA
G	12	RaShonta LeBlanc	5 ft 7 in (1.7 m)	So	Memorial	Port Arthur, TX
G	15	Quianna Chaney	5 ft 11 in (1.8 m)	So	Southern Lab	Baton Rouge, LA
F	22	Florence Williams	6 ft 1 in (1.85 m)	Sr	Miami Edison	Miami, FL
G	24	Marian Whitfield	5 ft 9 in (1.75 m)	So	Glenn Hills	Augusta, GA
G	32	Scholanda Dorrell	5 ft 10 in (1.78 m)	Sr	Miami Edison	Miami, FL
G	33	Seimone Augustus	6 ft 1 in (1.85 m)	Sr	Capitol	Baton Rouge, LA
C	34	Sylvia Fowles	6 ft 6 in (1.98 m)	So	Miami Edison	Miami, FL
F	44	Kristen Morris	6 ft 2 in (1.88 m)	Fr	Detroit Country Day	Lathrup Village, MI
F	54	Ashley Thomas	6 ft 0 in (1.83 m)	So	Stephenson	Stone Mountain, GA

Head coach

- Pokey Chatman (LSU)

Assistant coach(es)

- Bob Starkey
- Christie Sides
- Carla Berry

Legend

- (C) Team captain
- (S) Suspended
- (I) Ineligible
- (W) Walk-on
- Injured
- Current redshirt

Roster

== Schedule and results ==
Date time, TV	Rank^{#}	Opponent^{#}	Result	Record	Site (attendance) city, state
Exhibition
Nov 2, 2005*		Everyone's Internet	W 84–66		Maravich Assembly Center; Baton Rouge, LA
Nov 7, 2005*		Henderson State	W 107–50		Maravich Assembly Center; Baton Rouge, LA
Regular season
Nov 13, 2005*	No. 3	at No. 13 Texas Tech; State Farm Tip-Off Classic	W 76–68	1–0	United Spirit Arena; Lubbock, TX
Nov 22, 2005*	No. 3	Southern	W 107–39	2–0	Maravich Assembly Center; Baton Rouge, LA
Nov 25, 2005*	No. 3	vs. Nebraska; Miami Thanksgiving Classic	W 74–55	3–0	Ransom Everglades HS; Miami, FL
Nov 26, 2005*	No. 3	vs. Texas A&M–Corpus Christi; Miami Thanksgiving Classic	W 74–45	4–0	Ransom Everglades HS; Miami, FL
Dec 12, 2005*	No. 3	New Orleans	W 72–41	5–0	Maravich Assembly Center; Baton Rouge, LA
Dec 15, 2005*	No. 3	at No. 4 Ohio State	W 64–48	6–0	St. John Arena; Columbus, OH
Dec 18, 2005	No. 3	at Kentucky	W 66–36	7–0 (1–0)	Memorial Coliseum; Lexington, KY
Dec 20, 2005*	No. 3	Tulane	W 89–60	8–0	Maravich Assembly Center; Baton Rouge, LA
Dec 28, 2005*	No. 3	No. 10 Michigan State	W 72–52	9–0	Maravich Assembly Center; Baton Rouge, LA
Dec 30, 2005*	No. 3	South Florida	W 87–44	10–0	Maravich Assembly Center; Baton Rouge, LA
Jan 1, 2006*	No. 3	North Carolina A&T	W 99–35	11–0	Maravich Assembly Center; Baton Rouge, LA
Jan 4, 2006	No. 3	at Auburn	W 65–38	12–0 (2–0)	Beard–Eaves–Memorial Coliseum; Auburn, AL
Jan 7, 2006*	No. 3	No. 15 Minnesota	W 66–45	13–0	Maravich Assembly Center; Baton Rouge, LA
Jan 12, 2006	No. 3	South Carolina	W 79–46	14–0 (3–0)	Maravich Assembly Center; Baton Rouge, LA
Jan 16, 2006*	No. 3	at No. 5 Connecticut	L 48–51	14–1	Gampel Pavilion; Storrs, CT
Jan 19, 2006	No. 3	Alabama	W 79–43	15–1 (4–0)	Maravich Assembly Center; Baton Rouge, LA
Jan 22, 2006	No. 3	at No. 13 Georgia	W 65–64	16–1 (5–0)	Stegeman Coliseum; Athens, GA
Jan 26, 2006	No. 4	No. 22 Vanderbilt	W 75–53	17–1 (6–0)	Maravich Assembly Center; Baton Rouge, LA
Jan 30, 2006*	No. 3	No. 10 Baylor	W 88–57	18–1	Maravich Assembly Center; Baton Rouge, LA
Feb 2, 2006	No. 3	at Arkansas	W 93–59	19–1 (7–0)	Bud Walton Arena; Fayetteville, AR
Feb 5, 2006	No. 3	Ole Miss	W 78–63	20–1 (8–0)	Maravich Assembly Center; Baton Rouge, LA
Feb 9, 2006	No. 3	at No. 5 Tennessee	W 72–69	21–1 (9–0)	Thompson–Boling Arena; Knoxville, TN
Feb 12, 2006	No. 3	No. 13 Georgia	W 68–61	22–1 (10–0)	Maravich Assembly Center; Baton Rouge, LA
Feb 16, 2006	No. 2	at Florida	L 78–79 ^{OT}	22–2 (10–1)	Stephen C. O'Connell Center; Gainesville, FL
Feb 19, 2006	No. 2	Arkansas	W 64–42	23–2 (11–1)	Maravich Assembly Center; Baton Rouge, LA
Feb 23, 2006	No. 3	at Alabama	W 86–61	24–2 (12–1)	Coleman Coliseum; Tuscaloosa, AL
Feb 26, 2006	No. 3	Mississippi State	W 62–48	25–2 (13–1)	Maravich Assembly Center; Baton Rouge, LA
SEC Women's Tournament
March 3, 2006*	(1) No. 3	vs. (8) Ole Miss; Quarterfinals	W 91–73	26–2	Alltel Arena; Little Rock, AR
March 4, 2006*	(1) No. 3	vs. (4) Kentucky; Semifinals	W 79–52	27–2	Alltel Arena; Little Rock, AR
March 5, 2006*	(1) No. 3	vs. (2) No. 8 Tennessee; Championship game	L 62–63	27–3	Alltel Arena; Little Rock, AR
NCAA Tournament
March 18, 2006*	(1 SAN) No. 5	vs. (16 SAN) Florida Atlantic; First round	W 72–48	28–3	Memorial Gymnasium; Nashville, TN
March 20, 2006*	(1 SAN) No. 5	vs. (9 SAN) Washington; Second round	W 72–49	29–3	Memorial Gymnasium; Nashville, TN
March 25, 2006*	(1 SAN) No. 5	vs. (4 SAN) No. 13 DePaul; Regional Semifinal – Sweet Sixteen	W 66–56	30–3	AT&T Center; San Antonio, TX
March 27, 2006*	(1 SAN) No. 5	vs. (3 SAN) No. 13 Stanford; Regional Final – Elite Eight	W 62–59	31–3	AT&T Center; San Antonio, TX
Apr 2, 2006*	(1 SAN) No. 5	vs. (1 BPT) No. 4 Duke; National Semifinal – Final Four	L 45–64	31–4	TD Garden; Boston, MA
*Non-conference game. ^{#}Rankings from AP Poll. (#) Tournament seedings in parentheses. SAN=San Antonio Region. All times are in Central Time.

== Rankings ==
Ranking movements Legend: ██ Increase in ranking ██ Decrease in ranking
	Week																		
Poll	Pre	1	2	3	4	5	6	7	8	9	10	11	12	13	14	15	16	17	Final
AP	3	3	3	3	3	3	3	3	3	3	4	3	3	2	3	3	5	5	Not released
Coaches	3	3	3	3	3	3	3	3	3	4	5	4	4	3	3	3	5	5	4
