= 2006 NCAA Division I women's basketball tournament =

- Teams: 64
- Finals site: TD Banknorth Garden, Boston, Massachusetts
- Champions: Maryland Terrapins (1st title, 1st title game, 3rd Final Four)
- Runner-up: Duke Blue Devils (2nd title game, 4th Final Four)
- Semifinalists: North Carolina Tar Heels (2nd Final Four); LSU Tigers (3rd Final Four)
- Winning coach: Brenda Frese (1st title)
- MOP: Laura Harper (Maryland)

The 2006 NCAA Division I women's basketball tournament was held from March 18 to April 4, 2006, at several sites, with the championship game held in Boston. The Maryland Terrapins, coached by Brenda Frese, won their first National Championship, beating the Duke Blue Devils, coached by Gail Goestenkors, 78–75 in overtime. Laura Harper of the Terrapins was named Most Outstanding Player.

The field is set at 64 teams, with 31 automatic bids and 33 at-large bids. Unlike the men's game, there is no play-in game. In addition, the first two rounds and regionals are usually played on "neutral" sites.

As of the 2023 tournament, this is the last Final Four where all four teams were coached by women.

Until the 2023 tournament, this was the last Women's final four not to include either Connecticut or Tennessee.

== Notable events ==
In the Albuquerque Regional, Boston College upset the number one seed, Ohio State, in the second round. BC went on to play fifth seeded Utah in the regional semifinal, but Utah won by three points. Utah then played Maryland in the Regional final. With under eight seconds to go in regulation, Utah was trailing by a single point, with Shona Thorburn at the free throw line for two shots. She only made one, and the game went into overtime. This was familiar territory for the Terrapins, who were now playing in the fifth overtime game of their season. They had won the previous four, and would outscore Utah 12–2 to advance to the Final Four.

In the Bridgeport Regional, Connecticut won their first two games easily, then faced Georgia in their home state. The Huskies started out poorly, going without a single point for a stretch of over six minutes and were down 25–10 with under seven minutes to go in the first half. Then UConn scored 22 of the next 23 points to take a six-point lead. Georgia did not quit, and with seconds left, had a one-point lead. UConn had the ball and set up a last-ditch play. The play broke down, but Barbara Turner, not known as a three-point shooter, hit a three-pointer to put Connecticut up by two points with under two seconds to play. Georgia took a desperation, length of the court shot which bounced off the rim, and Connecticut held on to advance to the regional final. UConn head coach Geno Auriemma was quoted as saying, "I told the guys in the locker room, there are times that if you are lucky, fate taps you on the shoulder and you are ready. And today, we were ready".

In the regional final, top seeded Duke faced second seed UConn. With Connecticut down by two points late in the game, the Huskies Mel Thomas hit a two pint jumper to tie the game at 55 points apiece. Duke had 20 seconds left to hit a shot to take the lead. They called a timeout to set up a play but it broke down, and they called a timeout with three seconds left. The inbound pass ended up near half court, where an attempted buzzer beater bounced off the backboard, and the game went into overtime. The Blue Devils pulled out to a five-point lead with under three minutes to go, but did not score another point. UConn had the ball for a final play, down by two points, but Charde Houston missed an open jumper, and Duke won the right to go to the Final Four in Boston.

The Cleveland Regional got off to a newsworthy start during Tennessee's opening round game against Army, when the Lady Vols' Candace Parker because first woman to dunk in an NCAA tournament game and the first woman to dunk twice in a college game. Ultimately though, the top four seeds advance to the regional semifinals, the top two to the final, and top seed North Carolina beat Tennessee to advance to the Final Four. It was their first trip to the Final Four for the Tarheels since 1994, when they had won the National Championship.

The San Antonio Regional also largely followed the seeding, although third-seeded Stanford upset Oklahoma to reach the regional final. Although top seeded LSU was down by five points at halftime, they came back to beat Stanford by three points to earn a trip to the Final Four. LSU had only a one-point lead, when Candice Wiggins drove to the basket but Seimone Augustus stood in the way and took a charge. Wiggins had passed the ball to Krista Rappahahn who hit a three-pointer, but it was waved off because of the charge.

LSU was one of just seven schools to place both their men's and women's basketball teams in the Final Four in the same year. But one night after the men lost by double digits to UCLA, the women lost as well. Duke had a double-digit lead at halftime, which LSU cut to six points, but Duke then went on an 11–1 run to build the lead back up. Duke won the game 64–55 to head to the championship game.

North Carolina entered the other semifinal against Maryland with only a single loss on the season, but that loss was to Maryland. The first half was close, with Maryland holding just a two-point lead at the half. The Terrapins extended the lead in the second half to double digits, but North Carolina came back to cut the lead to three points with just over a minute left in the game. They would get no closer, and Maryland held on to win 81–70 to advance to the final game.

The semifinal wins set up an all-ACC championship game, between the two highest scoring teams in Division I. Duke had won 14 of the last 15 meetings between the two teams, but the sole win by Maryland in the streak was the most recent—the ACC semifinal match up. This game started as if it were a return to the usual results, with Duke reaching a double-digit lead at halftime, and extending to a 13-point lead in the second half. Maryland fought back, and with seconds to go in the game Kristi Toliver hit a three-pointer to tie the game. The game went into overtime, the sixth time this season Maryland had been in an overtime game. The Terrapins had won all five prior overtimes games, and this would be no different. Although down in overtime, Toliver hit two free throws to put her team back in front, and Maryland held on to win their first National Championship.

== Locations ==
2006 NCAA first and second round venues
2006 NCAA Regionals and Final Four

The tournament once again used the pod system, meaning that teams were more likely to play closer to home earlier in the tournament. The sites for the first two rounds were as follows:

- March 18 and 20:

Allstate Arena, Rosemont, Illinois (Host: DePaul University)
Pepsi Center, Denver, Colorado (Host: University of Colorado at Boulder and Big 12 Conference)
McKale Center, Tucson, Arizona (Host: University of Arizona)
Memorial Gymnasium, Nashville, Tennessee (Host: Vanderbilt University)

- March 19 and 21:

Ted Constant Convocation Center, Norfolk, Virginia (Host: Old Dominion University)
Sovereign Bank Arena, Trenton, New Jersey (Host: Rider University and Metro Atlantic Athletic Conference)
Bryce Jordan Center, State College, Pennsylvania (Host: Pennsylvania State University)
Mackey Arena, West Lafayette, Indiana (Host: Purdue University)

The Regional sites for this year (named after the city, a practice that is in use for the second consecutive year) were:

- March 25 and 27

Albuquerque Regional: The Pit, Albuquerque, New Mexico (Host: University of New Mexico)
San Antonio Regional: AT&T Center, San Antonio, Texas (Host: University of Texas at San Antonio)

- March 26 and 28

Bridgeport Regional: Bridgeport Arena at Harbor Yard, Bridgeport, Connecticut (Host: Fairfield University)
Cleveland Regional: Quicken Loans Arena, Cleveland, Ohio (Host: Cleveland State University and the Mid-American Conference)

The winners of the regionals advanced to the Final Four, held at TD Banknorth Garden, Boston, Massachusetts on April 2–4, 2006, hosted by Harvard University and Northeastern University.

== Tournament records ==
- Free throws—Erlana Larkins, North Carolina attempted 15 free throws in the national semifinal game against Maryland, tied for the most number of free throws attempted in an NCAA semifinal game.
- Rebounds—Khara Smith, DePaul, recorded 47 rebounds in three games. The 15.7 rebounds per game is the most ever occurring in an NCAA Tournament.
- Rebounds—Duke recorded 292 rebounds, the most ever recorded by a single team in an NCAA Tournament. South Carolina set a new record in 2022 with 294 rebounds.

== Qualifying teams - automatic ==
Sixty-four teams were selected to participate in the 2006 NCAA Tournament. Thirty-one conferences were eligible for an automatic bid to the 2006 NCAA tournament.

Automatic Bids
		Record		
Qualifying School	Conference	Regular Season	Conference	Seed
Army	Patriot League	20–10	11–3	15
Bowling Green	MAC	28–2	16–0	12
Chattanooga	Southern Conference	27–3	18–0	12
Coppin State	MEAC	22–8	18–0	15
Dartmouth	Ivy League	23–6	12–2	14
FAU	Atlantic Sun Conference	20–10	16–4	16
Hartford	America East	27–3	15–1	11
Liberty	Big South Conference	24–5	13–1	13
Louisiana Tech	WAC	26–4	15–1	11
Marist	MAAC	23–6	16–2	14
Middle Tennessee State	Sun Belt Conference	20–10	10–4	12
Milwaukee	Horizon League	21–8	14–2	13
Missouri State	Missouri Valley Conference	17–14	7–11	13
North Carolina	ACC	29–1	13–1	1
Northern Arizona	Big Sky Conference	22–10	9–5	14
Oakland	Mid-Continent	15–15	8–8	16
Ohio State	Big Ten	28–2	15–1	1
Oklahoma	Big 12	29–4	16–0	2
Old Dominion	Colonial	22–8	17–1	10
Pepperdine	West Coast Conference	14–16	8–6	15
Rutgers	Big East	25–4	16–0	3
Sacred Heart	Northeast Conference	26–4	16–2	15
Southeast Missouri State	Ohio Valley Conference	20–8	16–4	14
Southern	SWAC	20–10	14–4	16
Stanford	Pac-10	23–7	15–3	3
Stephen F. Austin	Southland	23–7	14–2	13
Temple	Atlantic 10	24–7	12–4	6
Tennessee	SEC	28-4	11-3	2
Tulsa	Conference USA	25–5	14–3	12
UC-Riverside	Big West Conference	16–14	7–7	16
Utah	Mountain West	24–6	12–4	5

== Qualifying teams - at-large ==
Thirty-three additional teams were selected to complete the sixty-four invitations.

At-large Bids
		Record		
Qualifying School	Conference	Regular Season	Conference	Seed
Arizona State	Pacific-10	24–6	14–4	4
Baylor	Big 12	24–6	12–4	3
Boston College	Atlantic Coast	19–11	6–8	8
BYU	Mountain West	25–5	13–3	7
UC-Berkeley	Pacific-10	18–11	10–8	10
Connecticut	Big East	29–4	14–2	2
DePaul	Big East	25–6	11–5	4
Duke	Atlantic Coast	26–3	12–2	1
Florida	Southeastern	21–8	8–6	6
Florida State	Atlantic Coast	19–9	10–4	6
George Washington	Atlantic 10	22–8	13–3	7
Georgia	Southeastern	21–8	10–4	3
Iowa	Big Ten	17–11	10–6	10
Kentucky	Southeastern	21–8	9–5	5
Louisville	Big East	19–9	10–6	9
LSU	Southeastern	27-3	13-1	1
Maryland	Atlantic Coast	28–4	12–2	2
Michigan State	Big Ten	22–9	11–5	4
Minnesota	Big Ten	19–9	11–5	8
Missouri	Big 12	21–9	10–6	10
New Mexico	Mountain West	21–9	11–5	11
N.C. State	Atlantic Coast	19–11	7–7	5
Notre Dame	Big East	18–11	8–8	9
Purdue	Big Ten	24–6	13–3	4
USF	Big East	18–11	9–7	9
USC	Pacific-10	18–11	11–7	8
St. John's	Big East	21–7	11–5	7
TCU	Mountain West	18–11	11–5	11
Texas A&M	Big 12	23–8	11–5	6
UCLA	Pacific-10	20–10	12–6	5
Vanderbilt	Southeastern	20–10	8–6	8
Virginia Tech	Atlantic Coast	20–9	6–8	7
Washington	Pacific-10	18–10	11–7	9

== Tournament seeds ==
Cleveland RegionalQuicken Loans Arena, Cleveland, Ohio
Seed	School	Conference	Record	Berth type
1	North Carolina	ACC	29-1	Automatic
2	Tennessee	SEC	28-4	Automatic
3	Rutgers	Big East	25-4	Automatic
4	Purdue	Big Ten	24-6	At-large
5	UCLA	Pac-10	20-10	At-large
6	Texas A&M	Big 12	23-8	At-large
7	George Washington	Atlantic 10	22-8	At-large
8	Vanderbilt	SEC	20-10	At-large
9	Louisville	Big East	19-9	At-large
10	Old Dominion	CAA	22-8	Automatic
11	TCU	Mountain West	18-11	At-large
12	Bowling Green	MAC	28-2	Automatic
13	Missouri State	Missouri Valley	17-14	Automatic
14	Dartmouth	Ivy	23-6	Automatic
15	Army	Patriot	20-10	Automatic
16	UC Riverside	Big West	16-14	Automatic

Bridgeport RegionalBridgeport Arena at Harbor Yard, Bridgeport, Connecticut
Seed	School	Conference	Record	Berth type
1	Duke	ACC	26-3	At-large
2	Connecticut	Big East	29-4	At-large
3	Georgia	SEC	21-8	At-large
4	Michigan State	Big Ten	22-9	At-large
5	Kentucky	SEC	21-8	At-large
6	Temple	Atlantic 10	24-7	Automatic
7	Virginia Tech	ACC	20-9	At-large
8	USC	Pac-10	18-11	At-large
9	South Florida	Big East	18-11	At-large
10	Missouri	Big 12	21-9	At-large
11	Hartford	America East	27-3	Automatic
12	Chattanooga	Southern	27-3	Automatic
13	Milwaukee	Horizon	21-8	Automatic
14	Marist	MAAC	23-6	Automatic
15	Coppin State	MEAC	22-8	Automatic
16	Southern	SWAC	20-10	Automatic

Albuquerque RegionalThe Pit, Albuquerque, New Mexico
Seed	School	Conference	Record	Berth type
1	Ohio State	Big Ten	28-2	Automatic
2	Maryland	ACC	28-4	At-large
3	Baylor	Big 12	24-6	At-large
4	Arizona State	Pac-10	24-6	At-large
5	Utah	Mountain West	24-6	Automatic
6	Florida	SEC	21-8	At-large
7	St. John's	Big East	21-7	At-large
8	Boston College	ACC	19-11	At-large
9	Notre Dame	Big East	18-11	At-large
10	California	Pac-10	18-11	At-large
11	New Mexico	Mountain West	21-9	At-large
12	Middle Tennessee	Sun Belt	20-10	Automatic
13	Stephen F. Austin	Southland	23-7	Automatic
14	Northern Arizona	Big Sky	22-10	Automatic
15	Sacred Heart	Northeast	26-4	Automatic
16	Oakland	Mid-Continent	15-15	Automatic

San Antonio RegionalAT&T Center, San Antonio, Texas
Seed	School	Conference	Record	Berth type
1	LSU	SEC	27-3	At-Large
2	Oklahoma	Big 12	29-4	Automatic
3	Stanford	Pac-10	23-7	Automatic
4	DePaul	Big East	25-6	At-large
5	NC State	ACC	19-11	At-large
6	Florida State	ACC	19-9	At-large
7	BYU	Mountain West	25-5	At-large
8	Minnesota	Big 10	19-9	At-large
9	Washington	Pac-10	18-10	At-large
10	Iowa	Big 10	17-11	At-large
11	Louisiana Tech	WAC	26-4	Automatic
12	Tulsa	Conference USA	25-5	Automatic
13	Liberty	Big South	24-5	Automatic
14	SE Missouri State (vacated)	Ohio Valley	20-8	Automatic
15	Pepperdine	West Coast	14-16	Automatic
16	Florida Atlantic	Atlantic Sun	20-10	Automatic

== Bids by conference ==
Thirty-one conferences earned an automatic bid. In twenty-three cases, the automatic bid was the only representative from the conference. Thirty-three additional at-large teams were selected from eight of the conferences.

Bids	Conference	Teams
7	Atlantic Coast	North Carolina, Boston College, Duke, Florida St., Maryland, North Carolina St., Virginia Tech
7	Big East	Rutgers, Connecticut, DePaul, Louisville, Notre Dame, South Fla., St. John's NY
6	Pacific-10	Stanford, Arizona St., California, Southern California, UCLA, Washington
6	Southeastern	LSU, Florida, Georgia, Kentucky, Tennessee, Vanderbilt
5	Big Ten	Ohio St., Iowa, Michigan St., Minnesota, Purdue
4	Big 12	Oklahoma, Baylor, Missouri, Texas A&M
4	Mountain West	Utah, BYU, New Mexico, TCU
2	Atlantic 10	Temple, George Washington
1	America East	Hartford
1	Atlantic Sun	Fla. Atlantic
1	Big Sky	Northern Ariz.
1	Big South	Liberty
1	Big West	UC Riverside
1	Colonial	Old Dominion
1	Conference USA	Tulsa
1	Horizon	Milwaukee
1	Ivy	Dartmouth
1	Metro Atlantic	Marist
1	Mid-American	Bowling Green
1	Mid-Continent	Oakland
1	Mid-Eastern	Coppin St.
1	Missouri Valley	Missouri St.
1	Northeast	Sacred Heart
1	Ohio Valley	Southeast Mo. St.
1	Patriot	Army
1	Southern	Chattanooga
1	Southland	Stephen F. Austin
1	Southwestern	Southern U.
1	Sun Belt	Middle Tenn.
1	West Coast	Pepperdine
1	Western Athletic	Louisiana Tech

== Bids by state ==
The sixty-four teams came from twenty-nine states, plus Washington, D.C. California had the most teams with six bids. Twenty-one states did not have any teams receiving bids.

NCAA Women's basketball Tournament invitations by state 2006

Bids	State	Teams
6	California	Pepperdine, Stanford, UC Riverside, California, Southern California, UCLA
4	Florida	Fla. Atlantic, Florida, Florida St., South Fla.
4	Tennessee	Chattanooga, Middle Tenn., Tennessee, Vanderbilt
4	Texas	Stephen F. Austin, Baylor, TCU, Texas A&M
3	Connecticut	Hartford, Sacred Heart, Connecticut
3	Louisiana	Louisiana Tech, LSU, Southern U.
3	Missouri	Missouri St., Missouri, Southeast Mo. St.
3	New York	Army, Marist, St. John's NY
3	North Carolina	North Carolina, Duke, North Carolina St.
3	Virginia	Liberty, Old Dominion, Virginia Tech
2	Arizona	Northern Ariz., Arizona St.
2	Indiana	Notre Dame, Purdue
2	Kentucky	Kentucky, Louisville
2	Maryland	Coppin St., Maryland
2	Michigan	Oakland, Michigan St.
2	Ohio	Bowling Green, Ohio St.
2	Oklahoma	Oklahoma, Tulsa
2	Utah	Utah, BYU
1	District of Columbia	George Washington
1	Georgia	Georgia
1	Illinois	DePaul
1	Iowa	Iowa
1	Massachusetts	Boston College
1	Minnesota	Minnesota
1	New Hampshire	Dartmouth
1	New Jersey	Rutgers
1	New Mexico	New Mexico
1	Pennsylvania	Temple
1	Washington	Washington
1	Wisconsin	Milwaukee

== Brackets ==
Data source
*-Overtime game.

=== Cleveland Regional ===
First round March 18 and 19
1	North Carolina	75
16	UC Riverside	51
Nashville, TN – Sat/Mon
8	Vanderbilt	76
9	Louisville	64
5	UCLA	74
12	Bowling Green	61
West Lafayette, IN – Sun/Tue
4	Purdue	73
13	Missouri State	54
6	Texas A&M	65
11	TCU	69
Trenton, NJ – Sun/Tue
3	Rutgers	63
14	Dartmouth	58
7	George Washington	87
10	Old Dominion	72
Norfolk, VA – Sun/Tue
2	Tennessee	102
15	Army	54

Second round March 20 and 21
1	North Carolina	89
8	Vanderbilt	70
5	UCLA	54
4	Purdue	61
11	TCU	48
3	Rutgers	82
7	George Washington	53
2	Tennessee	66

Regional semifinals March 26
1	North Carolina	70
4	Purdue	68
3	Rutgers	69
2	Tennessee	76

Regional finals March 28
1	North Carolina	75
2	Tennessee	63

=== Albuquerque Regional ===
First round March 18 and 19
1	Ohio State	68
16	Oakland (MI)	45
West Lafayette, IN – Sun/Tue
8	Boston College	78
9	Notre Dame	61
5	Utah	76
12	Middle Tennessee	71
Tucson, AZ – Sat/Mon
4	Arizona State	80
13	Stephen F. Austin	61
6	Florida	59
11	New Mexico	83
Tucson, AZ – Sat/Mon
3	Baylor	74
14	Northern Arizona	56
7	St. John's	78
10	California	68
State College, PA – Sun/Tue
2	Maryland	95
15	Sacred Heart	54

Second round March 20 and 21
1	Ohio State	69
8	Boston College	79
5	Utah	86
4	Arizona State	65
11	New Mexico	67
3	Baylor	87
7	St. John's	74
2	Maryland	81

Regional semifinals March 25
8	Boston College	54
5	Utah	57
3	Baylor	63
2	Maryland	82

Regional finals March 27
5	Utah	65
2	Maryland	75*

=== Bridgeport Regional ===
First round March 18 and 19
1	Duke	96
16	Southern	27
Norfolk, VA – Sun/Tue
8	USC	67
9	South Florida	65
5	Kentucky	69
12	Chattanooga	59
Rosemont, IL – Sat/Mon
4	Michigan State	65
13	Milwaukee	46
6	Temple	58
11	Hartford	64
Trenton, NJ – Sun/Tue
3	Georgia	75
14	Marist	60
7	Virginia Tech	82
10	Missouri	51
State College, PA – Sun/Tue
2	Connecticut	77
15	Coppin State	54

Second round March 20 and 21
1	Duke	85
8	USC	51
5	Kentucky	63
4	Michigan State	67
11	Hartford	54
3	Georgia	73
7	Virginia Tech	56
2	Connecticut	79

Regional semifinals March 26
1	Duke	86
4	Michigan State	61
3	Georgia	75
2	Connecticut	77

Regional finals March 28
1	Duke	63*
2	Connecticut	61

=== San Antonio Regional ===
First round March 18
1	LSU	72
16	Florida Atlantic	48
Nashville, TN
8	Minnesota	69
9	Washington	73
5	NC State	61
12	Tulsa	71
Rosemont, IL
4	DePaul	68
13	Liberty	43
6	Florida State	80
11	Louisiana Tech	71
Denver, CO
3	Stanford	72
14	SE Missouri State	45
7	BYU	67
10	Iowa	62
Denver, CO
2	Oklahoma	78
15	Pepperdine	66

Second round March 20
1	LSU	72
9	Washington	49
12	Tulsa	67
4	DePaul	71
6	Florida State	70
3	Stanford	88
7	BYU	70
2	Oklahoma	86

Regional semifinals March 25
1	LSU	66
4	DePaul	56
3	Stanford	88
2	Oklahoma	74

Regional finals March 27
1	LSU	62
3	Stanford	59

=== Final Four – Boston, Massachusetts ===
National Semifinals; April 2
Alb2	Maryland	81
Cle1	North Carolina	70
Bpt1	Duke	64
SA1	LSU	45

National Championship; April 4
Alb2	Maryland	78*
Bpt1	Duke	75

Alb-Albuquerque; Bpt-Bridgeport; Cle-Cleveland; SA-San Antonio.

== Record by conference ==
Conference	# of Bids	Record	Win %	Round of 32	Sweet Sixteen	Elite Eight	Final Four	Championship Game
Atlantic Coast	7	19–6	.760	6	4	3	3	2
Big East	7	8–7	.533	4	3	1	0	0
Southeastern	6	11–6	.647	5	3	2	1	0
Pacific-10	6	7–6	.538	5	1	1	0	0
Big Ten	5	5–5	.500	3	2	0	0	0
Mountain West	4	6–4	.600	4	1	1	0	0
Big 12	4	4–4	.500	2	2	0	0	0
Atlantic 10	2	1–2	.333	1	0	0	0	0
America East	1	1–1	.500	1	0	0	0	0
Conference USA	1	1–1	.500	1	0	0	0	0

Twenty-one conferences went 0-1: Atlantic Sun Conference, Big Sky Conference, Big South Conference, Big West Conference, Colonial, Horizon League, Ivy League, MAAC, MAC, Mid-Continent, MEAC, Missouri Valley Conference, Northeast Conference, Ohio Valley Conference, Patriot League, Southern Conference, Southland, SWAC, Sun Belt Conference, West Coast Conference, and WAC

== All-Tournament Team ==
- Laura Harper, Maryland
- Alison Bales, Duke
- Monique Currie, Duke
- Erlana Larkins, North Carolina
- Kristi Toliver, Maryland

== Game Officials ==
- Melissa Barlow (semifinal)
- Scott Yarbrough (semifinal)
- Eric Brewton (semifinal)
- Dee Kantner (semifinal)
- Denise Brooks-Clauser (semifinal)
- Michael Price (semifinal)
- Lisa Mattingly (final)
- Bob Trammell (final)
- Tina Napier (final)

== See also ==
- 2006 NCAA Division II women's basketball tournament
- 2006 NCAA Division III women's basketball tournament
- 2006 NAIA Division I women's basketball tournament
- 2006 NAIA Division II women's basketball tournament
- 2006 NCAA Division I men's basketball tournament
