= 2005–06 NCAA Division I women's basketball rankings =

- Season: 2005–06
- NCAA Tournament: 2006
- Preseason No. 1: Duke
- NCAA Tournament Champions: Maryland
NCAA Division I women's basketball rankings


Two human polls comprise the 2005–06 NCAA Division I women's basketball rankings, the AP Poll and the Coaches Poll, in addition to various publications' preseason polls. The AP poll is currently a poll of sportswriters, while the USA Today Coaches' Poll is a poll of college coaches. The AP conducts polls weekly through the end of the regular season and conference play, while the Coaches poll conducts a final, post-NCAA tournament poll as well.

== Legend ==
–	No votes
(#)	Ranking

== AP Poll ==
Team	2-Nov	21-Nov	28-Nov	5-Dec	12-Dec	19-Dec	26-Dec	2-Jan	9-Jan	16-Jan	23-Jan	30-Jan	6-Feb	13-Feb	20-Feb	27-Feb	6-Mar	13-Mar
North Carolina St.	23	–	–	25	23	–	–	–	25	–	–	24	–	–	–	–	–	–
St. John’s (NY)	–	–	–	–	–	–	–	–	–	–	–	25	23	–	–	–	–	–
2005–06 North Carolina Tar Heels women's basketball team North Carolina	7	7	7	7	6	5	5	5	4	4	3	1	1	3	2	1	1	1
Ohio St.	4	4	4	4	4	7	7	10	9	7	7	7	6	6	6	5	2	2
Arizona St.	20	16	15	15	12	12	11	9	15	15	19	18	16	15	11	11	15	15
Michigan St	10	9	13	13	11	11	10	11	9	12	16	17	15	14	14	16	16	16
Louisiana Tech	–	–	–	–	–	–	–	–	–	–	–	–	T24	24	20	19	17	17
Texas A&M	–	–	–	–	–	–	–	–	–	–	–	–	T24	21	25	25	22	20
Bowling Green	–	–	–	–	–	–	–	–	–	–	–	–	–	–	–	–	24	23
New Mexico	–	25	21	18	18	18	16	21	18	20	18	16	20	20	23	21	21	24
Boston College	–	–	–	–	–	23	24	19	22	22	–	23	21	18	T17	–	–	–
George Washington	–	–	–	–	–	–	–	–	–	25	–	–	–	–	–	–	–	–
Notre Dame	15	13	11	10	13	13	12	12	20	24	21	–	–	–	–	–	–	–
Ole Miss	–	–	–	–	–	24	–	–	–	–	–	–	–	–	–	–	–	–
Southern California	24	24	–	–	–	–	–	–	–	–	23	–	–	–	–	–	–	–
Texas Tech	13	14	24	–	–	–	–	–	–	–	–	–	–	–	–	–	–	–
Virginia Tech	–	–	–	–	–	–	25	25	21	18	25	–	–	–	–	–	–	–
Baylor	6	5	5	5	5	4	4	4	5	8	9	10	12	12	10	10	10	10
BYU	–	–	–	–	–	–	–	–	–	23	20	19	18	19	21	18	20	22
DePaul	18	17	14	T11	16	14	13	13	11	10	12	13	17	16	16	15	13	T13
Duke	1	1	1	2	2	2	2	2	2	2	2	2	2	1	1	2	4	4
Florida	–	–	–	–	–	–	–	–	–	–	24	–	–	–	–	T23	–	–
Georgia	8	11	17	17	17	15	17	17	13	13	15	14	13	13	13	12	14	12
Kentucky	–	–	–	–	–	–	–	–	–	–	–	21	–	–	–	–	–	–
LSU	3	3	3	3	3	3	3	3	3	3	4	3	3	2	3	3	5	5
Maryland	14	10	9	9	8	6	6	6	6	6	6	6	6	4	4	4	3	3
Minnesota	16	12	10	14	14	17	15	15	17	16	14	12	11	17	22	20	23	25
Missouri	–	–	–	–	–	–	–	–	24	–	–	–	–	–	–	–	–	–
Oklahoma	25	22	20	16	15	16	20	18	16	17	13	11	9	9	9	9	8	7
Purdue	19	19	22	24	20	21	18	14	12	11	8	8	10	10	12	14	12	11
Rutgers	5	6	6	6	7	9	9	8	10	9	10	9	8	7	7	6	6	9
Stanford	11	15	12	T11	10	10	14	16	14	14	11	15	14	11	15	13	11	T13
Temple	21	21	18	20	25	25	22	24	19	21	17	20	19	23	T17	22	18	19
Tennessee	2	2	2	1	1	1	1	1	1	1	1	5	5	5	5	8	7	6
Texas	12	18	16	19	19	20	19	23	–	–	–	–	–	–	–	–	–	–
UCLA	–	–	23	22	24	–	–	–	–	–	–	–	–	–	–	–	–	21
UConn	9	8	8	8	9	8	8	7	7	5	5	4	4	8	8	7	9	8
Utah	22	23	25	23	22	22	23	22	–	–	–	–	–	25	19	17	19	18
Vanderbilt	17	20	19	21	21	19	21	20	23	19	22	22	22	22	24	T23	25	–

== USA Today Coaches poll ==
Team	14-Nov	21-Nov	27-Nov	5-Dec	12-Dec	19-Dec	26-Dec	2-Jan	9-Jan	16-Jan	23-Jan	30-Jan	6-Feb	13-Feb	20-Feb	27-Feb	6-Mar	13-Mar	5-Apr
Maryland	14	10	9	8	8	T6	6	6	6	6	6	6	6	4	4	4	3	3	1
Duke	2	2	2	2	2	2	2	2	2	2	1	2	2	1	1	2	4	4	2
North Carolina	8	8	8	6	6	5	5	5	4	3	2	1	1	2	2	1	1	1	3
LSU	3	3	3	3	3	3	3	3	3	4	5	4	4	3	3	3	5	5	4
Tennessee	1	1	1	1	1	1	1	1	1	1	3	5	5	5	5	9	6	6	5
UConn	7	6	6	9	9	8	8	7	7	5	4	3	3	6	T6	7	7	7	6
Stanford	9	13	11	11	11	11	14	T16	15	15	13	15	14	12	15	14	14	14	7
Oklahoma	22	23	19	17	15	17	20	T16	16	17	14	13	12	9	9	8	8	8	8
Rutgers	6	7	7	7	7	9	9	8	9	9	9	9	8	8	8	6	9	9	9
Ohio St.	4	4	4	4	4	T6	7	10	8	7	7	7	7	7	T6	5	2	2	10
Purdue	24	24	23	23	20	20	17	14	11	11	8	8	9	10	11	11	11	11	11
Utah	21	20	22	22	21	21	22	22	–	–	–	–	–	–	24	22	21	19	12
Georgia	10	11	17	16	17	18	18	18	17	16	15	14	13	13	12	12	12	12	13
Baylor	5	5	5	5	5	4	4	4	5	8	10	10	11	11	10	10	10	10	14
DePaul	18	17	14	13	16	14	13	11	10	10	11	11	15	15	14	15	13	13	15
Michigan	11	9	15	15	13	13	12	13	12	14	16	17	16	14	16	17	17	17	16
Arizona St.	15	14	13	12	10	10	10	9	13	13	18	18	17	17	13	13	15	15	17
UCLA	–	–	–	25	24	–	–	–	–	–	–	–	–	–	–	–	–	23	18
Boston College	–	–	–	–	T25	24	24	21	22	21	24	22	22	20	19	25	–	–	19
BYU	–	–	–	–	–	–	–	–	–	23	20	19	18	18	18	16	19	20	20
New Mexico	–	25	21	18	18	16	16	20	18	18	17	16	T20	19	22	19	20	24	21
Vanderbilt	20	22	20	20	19	19	19	19	21	19	22	21	T20	21	23	23	24	25	22
Temple	19	19	16	19	23	22	21	23	20	20	19	20	19	22	17	20	18	18	23
Louisiana Tech	–	–	–	–	–	–	–	–	–	–	–	24	23	24	20	18	16	16	24
George Washington	–	–	–	–	–	–	–	–	–	25	–	–	–	–	–	–	–	–	25
Bowling Green	–	–	–	–	–	–	–	–	–	–	–	–	–	25	25	24	22	21	–
Florida	–	–	–	–	–	–	–	25	24	–	23	–	–	–	–	–	–	–	–
Kentucky	–	–	–	–	–	–	–	–	–	–	–	23	–	–	–	–	–	–	–
Minnesota	17	12	10	14	12	15	15	15	14	12	12	12	10	16	21	21	25	–	–
North Carolina St.	25	–	–	–	–	–	–	–	–	–	–	–	–	–	–	–	–	–	–
Notre Dame	16	15	12	10	14	12	11	12	19	22	21	–	–	–	–	–	–	–	–
Ole Miss	–	–	–	–	–	25	25	–	–	–	–	–	–	–	–	–	–	–	–
Southern California	23	21	25	24	T25	–	–	–	–	–	25	–	–	–	–	–	–	–	–
St. John’s (NY)	–	–	–	–	–	–	–	–	–	–	–	25	24	–	–	–	–	–	–
Texas	12	18	18	21	22	23	23	24	–	–	–	–	–	–	–	–	–	–	–
Texas A&M	–	–	–	–	–	–	–	–	–	–	–	–	25	23	–	–	23	22	–
Texas Tech	13	16	24	–	–	–	–	–	–	–	–	–	–	–	–	–	–	–	–
Virginia Tech	–	–	–	–	–	–	–	–	23	24	–	–	–	–	–	–	–	–	–
Washington	–	–	–	–	–	–	–	–	25	–	–	–	–	–	–	–	–	–	–
