= Coppin State Eagles women's basketball =

College level women's basketball team

2026–27 Coppin State Eagles women's basketball team
- University: Coppin State University
- Head coach: Darrell Mosley (2nd season)
- Location: Baltimore, Maryland
- Arena: Physical Education Complex (capacity: 4,100)
- Conference: MEAC
- Nickname: Eagles
- Colors: Blue and gold

NCAA Division I tournament appearances
- 2005, 2006, 2008

Conference tournament champions
- 1991, 2005, 2006, 2008

Conference regular-season champions
- 1993, 2005, 2006, 2007

The Coppin State Eagles women's basketball team represents Coppin State University in Baltimore, Maryland, United States. The school's team currently competes in the NCAA Division I in the Mid-Eastern Athletic Conference.

== History ==
Coppin State began play in 1985. They went winless in their first season, losing all 25 games. They recorded their first win 11 games into their second season, which was their only win of that season. They recorded their first winning season in 1990–91, going 19–8. That year, they won the MEAC Tournament, beating Delaware State, South Carolina State, and North Carolina A&T. At that time, MEAC Tournament winners were not invited to the NCAA Tournament, so the Eagles closed their season out with their first ever MEAC title. Two seasons later, they won a share of MEAC regular season title, going 20–9 and 12–4 in MEAC play to share the title with South Carolina State and Florida A&M. However, they lost to South Carolina State in the Third Round of the MEAC Tournament. In 2005, they won both the regular season and tournament title, going 23–8 and 15–3 in MEAC play while beating Norfolk State in the MEAC final to win their first tournament title in twelve years and go to their first ever NCAA Tournament. They won the regular season and tournament title the following year (2006), going to their second straight NCAA Tournament. They went to the NCAA Tournament for the third time in four years after beating North Carolina A&T in the tournament final. As of the end of the 2015–16 season, the Eagles have an all-time record of 412–482.

== Postseason appearances ==
=== NCAA appearances ===
Coppin State has appeared in the NCAA Division I women's basketball tournament three times. The Eagles have a record of 0–3.

Year	Seed	Round	Opponent	Result/Score
2005	#16	First Round	#1 North Carolina	L 62–97
2006	#15	First Round	#2 Connecticut	L 54–77
2008	#16	First Round	#1 Maryland	L 66–80

=== WNIT appearances ===
The Eagles are 1–2 in WNIT appearances.

Year	Round	Opponent	Result/Score
2007	First Round; Second Round	Saint Joseph's; South Florida	W 67–52; L 49–66
2009	First Round	West Virginia	L 40–70
