= Virginia Tech Hokies women's basketball =

NCAA Division 1 program

2026–27 Virginia Tech Hokies women's basketball team
- University: Virginia Tech
- Head coach: Megan Duffy (3rd season)
- Location: Blacksburg, Virginia
- Arena: Cassell Coliseum
- Conference: Atlantic Coast Conference
- Nickname: Hokies
- Colors: Chicago maroon and burnt orange

NCAA Division I tournament Final Four
- 2023
Other NCAA Division I tournament results
Elite Eight	2023
Sweet Sixteen	1999, 2023
Appearances	1994, 1995, 1998, 1999, 2001, 2003, 2004, 2005, 2006, 2021, 2022, 2023, 2024, 2026

Conference tournament champions
- Metro: 1994 Atlantic 10: 1998 ACC: 2023

Conference regular-season champions
- Atlantic 10: 1999 ACC: 2024

Uniforms
Home	Away	Alternate

The Virginia Tech Hokies women's basketball team represents Virginia Tech in women's basketball. The school competes in the Atlantic Coast Conference in Division I of the National Collegiate Athletic Association (NCAA). They are currently coached by Megan Duffy.

== Year by year results ==
As of the 2015–16 season, the Hokies have a 622–546 all-time record, with 9 appearances in the NCAA Tournament. They played in the Metro Conference from the 1981–82 season to the 1994–95 season. They played in the Atlantic 10 Conference from the 1995–96 season to the 1999–00 season. They played in the Big East Conference from the 2000–01 season to the 2003–04 season. They have played in the Atlantic Coast Conference since the 2004–05 season.

Season	Record	Conference Record	Coach
1976–77	7–9	n/a	John Wetzel
1977–78	8–16	n/a	Carolyn Owen
1978–79	9–15	n/a	Carol Alfano
1979–80	17–12	n/a	Carol Alfano
1980–81	13–17	n/a	Carol Alfano
1981–82	16–12	0–5	Carol Alfano
1982–83	13–12	2–3	Carol Alfano
1983–84	15–15	4–6	Carol Alfano
1984–85	16–13	4–6	Carol Alfano
1985–86	13–15	4–6	Carol Alfano
1986–87	15–14	7–5	Carol Alfano
1987–88	12–16	4–8	Carol Alfano
1988–89	16–13	7–5	Carol Alfano
1989–90	14–14	8–6	Carol Alfano
1990–91	12–15	8–6	Carol Alfano
1991–92	10–18	3–9	Carol Alfano
1992–93	20–8	8–4	Carol Alfano
1993–94	24–6	9–3	Carol Alfano
1994–95	22–9	10–2	Carol Alfano
1995–96	11–17	8–8	Carol Alfano
1996–97	10–21	4–12	Carol Alfano
1997–98	22–10	11–5	Bonnie Henrickson
1998–99	28–3	15–1	Bonnie Henrickson
1999-00	20–11	12–6	Bonnie Henrickson
2000–01	22–9	11–5	Bonnie Henrickson
2001–02	21–11	9–7	Bonnie Henrickson
2002–03	22–10	10–6	Bonnie Henrickson
2003–04	23–8	10–6	Bonnie Henrickson
2004–05	17–12	6–8	Beth Dunkenberger
2005–06	21–10	6–8	Beth Dunkenberger
2006–07	19–15	6–8	Beth Dunkenberger
2007–08	15–15	2–12	Beth Dunkenberger
2008–09	12–18	2–12	Beth Dunkenberger
2009–10	15–15	4–10	Beth Dunkenberger
2010–11	11–19	1–13	Beth Dunkenberger
2011–12	7–23	3–13	Dennis Wolff
2012–13	10–20	4–14	Dennis Wolff
2013–14	14–16	4–12	Dennis Wolff
2014–15	12–20	1–15	Dennis Wolff
2015–16	18–14	5–11	Dennis Wolff
2016–17	20–14	4–12	Kenny Brooks
2017–18	23–14	6–10	Kenny Brooks
2018–19	22–12	6–10	Kenny Brooks
2019–20	21–9	11–7	Kenny Brooks
2020–21	15–10	8–8	Kenny Brooks
2021–22	23–10	13–5	Kenny Brooks
2022–23	31–5	14–4	Kenny Brooks
2023–24	25–8	14–4	Kenny Brooks
2024–25	18–12	9–9	Megan Duffy
2025–26	23–10	12–6	Megan Duffy

== NCAA tournament results ==
Virginia Tech has reached the NCAA Division I women's basketball tournament 28 times. They have a record of 14–14.

Year	Seed	Round	Opponent	Result
1994	#8	First Round	#9 Auburn	L 60–51
1995	#8	First Round; Second Round	#9 St. Joseph's #1 Connecticut	W 62–52; L 91–45
1998	#11	First Round; Second Round	#6 Wisconsin #3 Florida	W 75–64; L 89–57
1999	#4	First Round; Second Round; Sweet Sixteen	#13 St. Peter's #5 Auburn #1 Tennessee	W 73–48; W 76–61; L 68–52
2001	#7	First Round; Second Round	#10 Denver #2 Texas Tech	W 77–57; L 73–52
2003	#7	First Round; Second Round	#10 Georgia Tech #2 Purdue	W 61–59; L 80–62
2004	#8	First Round; Second Round	#9 Iowa #1 Penn State	W 89–76; L 61–48
2005	#12	First Round	#5 DePaul	L 79–78
2006	#7	First Round; Second Round	#10 Missouri #2 Connecticut	W 82–51; L 79–56
2021	#7	First Round; Second Round	#10 Marquette #2 Baylor	W 70–63; L 90–48
2022	#5	First Round	#12 Florida Gulf Coast	L 84–81
2023	#1	First Round; Second Round; Sweet Sixteen; Elite Eight; Final Four	#16 Chattanooga #9 South Dakota State #4 Tennessee #3 Ohio State #3 LSU	W 58–33; W 72–60; W 73–64; W 84–74; L 72–79
2024	#4	First Round; Second Round	#13 Marshall #5 Baylor	W 92–49; L 72–75
2026	#9	First Round	#8 Oregon	L 60–70

== WBIT results ==
Year	Seed	Round	Opponent	Result
2025	#1	First Round; Second Round	North Carolina A&T; Texas Tech	W 61–48; L 59–69

== Roster ==
2026–27 Virginia Tech Hokies women's basketball team
Players
Coaches

Pos.	#	Name	Height	Year	Previous school	Hometown
G	1	Carleigh Wenzel	6 ft 0 in (1.83 m)	GS	Antonian College Prep	San Antonio, TX
G	2	Leila Wells	5 ft 9 in (1.75 m)	Jr	Chelsea	Chelsea, MI
G	4	Natalee Goff	5 ft 11 in (1.8 m)	Jr	Emmanuel	Lavonia, GA
C	6	Jessica Dimaro	6 ft 4 in (1.93 m)	Fr		Yenagoa, Nigeria
G	8	Francesca Baldassarre	5 ft 9 in (1.75 m)	Fr		Brindisi, Italy
G	10	Kaleo Anderson	6 ft 0 in (1.83 m)	Fr	King's	Mill Creek, WA
G/F	11	Lauren Hurst	6 ft 3 in (1.91 m)	So	Tennessee	Cleveland, TN
G	12	Samyha Suffren	5 ft 8 in (1.73 m)	RS Jr	Cannon	Charlotte, NC
G	13	Kate Sears	5 ft 9 in (1.75 m)	RS Fr	Watauga	Boone, NC
F	23	Alyssa Latham	6 ft 2 in (1.88 m)	GS	Tennessee	Glenwood, IL
F	24	Amani Jenkins	6 ft 3 in (1.91 m)	So	Johnston	Johnston, IA
F	25	Arianna Harris-Mott	6 ft 4 in (1.93 m)	Fr	St. Vincent Pallotti	Columbia, MD
F	30	Aniya Trent	6 ft 3 in (1.91 m)	So	Springboro	Springboro, OH

Head coach

- Megan Duffy (Notre Dame)

Assistant coach(es)

- Itoro Coleman (Clemson)
- Jen Hoover (Wake Forest)
- Sharnee Zoll (Virginia)
- Ke'Sha Blanton (Toledo)
- Jerod McCullen (Central Michigan)

Legend

- (C) Team captain
- (S) Suspended
- (I) Ineligible
- (W) Walk-on
- Injured
- Current redshirt

Roster
Last update: September 2, 2026
