= Boston College Eagles women's basketball =

Women's college basketball team

2026–27 Boston College Eagles women's basketball team
- University: Boston College
- Head coach: Kate Popovec-Goss (1st season)
- Location: Chestnut Hill, Massachusetts
- Arena: Conte Forum (capacity: 8,606)
- Conference: Atlantic Coast Conference
- Nickname: Eagles
- Colors: Maroon and gold

NCAA Division I tournament Sweet Sixteen
- 2003, 2004, 2006

NCAA Division I tournament appearances
- 1999, 2000, 2002, 2003, 2004, 2005, 2006

Conference tournament champions
- 2004 (Big East)

Uniforms
Home	Away	Alternate

Boston College Eagles Women's Basketball is the NCAA Division I women's basketball program that represents Boston College in Chestnut Hill, Massachusetts. The team has competed in the Atlantic Coast Conference (ACC) since 2005, having previously played in the Big East. The Eagles have appeared in 7 NCAA Tournaments in their history, most recently in 2006. They play home games at the Conte Forum, and are currently coached by Kate Popovec-Goss, entering her first year.

== History ==
The Boston College women's basketball team played its first game January 9, 1973, and lost to Eastern Nazarene 42–35. In its next game BC downed Jackson, 52–30, to win its first game in the program's history. The Eagles finished their first season 4–6 with wins over Mount Ida, Stonehill College and Radcliffe. In her second season as head coach, Maureen Enos lead BC to a 9–4 record for the team's first-ever winning record.

Margo Plotzke took over in time for the 1980 season and she would finish her 14-season career on The Heights with only five losing seasons and a 177 wins.

In 1982 the women's team joined the Big East, finishing the season with a then-BC record 17 wins, but going only 3–7 in the conference. In the Big East tourney Boston College beat UConn 69–57, but bowed out after a loss to Providence, 56–38. In 1984–85 BC went 19–9 – its best season to that date – but found itself on the short end of a loss to Vilanova in the league tournament, ending its season.

=== Cathy Inglese arrives ===
In 1993 Cathy Inglese was named head coach of the basketball team and, after several years of rebuilding, turned the team into a perennial NCAA tournament team. Since the 1998–99 season, BC has been invited to the NCAA tournament six times, won the 2004 Big East title and advanced to the Sweet Sixteen twice—in 2003 and 2004.

In the 1998–99 season Inglese lead the Eagles to its first ever NCAA tournament appearance, a 22–8 overall record and the Eagles went 12–6 in the Big East. In its first-ever NCAA tourney game, BC beat Ohio State and then ran into Pat Summitt and Tennessee and lost in the second round.

The next season was even better for the Eagles as they won 26 total games, but again found themselves eliminated in the second round of the NCAA tournament when Virginia edged them out, 74–70. A season plagued by injuries marred the 2000-01 team which finished at 14-15 and on the outside looking into The Dance. In 2001–02, BC—who finished the season ranked 21st—received another invitation to the NCAA tournament but were ousted in the first round this time when Mississippi State took care of the women's team 65–59.

=== Sweet Sixteen years ===
Coach Inglese lead Boston College to back-to-back appearances in the Sweet Sixteen in the 2002–03 and 2003–04 seasons. BC finished the 2003 season ranked No. 25 and entered the NCAA tourney with a 20–9 record and, as a No. 5 seed, squeaked by Old Dominion 73–72 in the first round, then won another thriller on an Amber Jacobs jumper, which blounced around the rim, and fell in with 2.5 seconds remaining — giving the Eagles an 86–85 overtime win over Vanderbilt. Boston College was then steamrolled by No. 1 UConn as Diana Taurasi and Co. bounced BC 70–49.

In 2004 the women's team exacted some postseason revenge when BC upset the University of Connecticut in the Big East Tournament, 73–70, in the semi-finals. Boston College, who defeated Syracuse and Miami en route to its March 8 win over the Huskies, downed Rutgers in the finals to capture the Big East Tournament title—becoming the first Big East team to win four games to take the tournament crown. For its tournament title, BC finished the year ranked No. 18 and headed into the NCAA's as a No. 3 seed. The Eagles downed Eastern Michigan 58–56 in the first round; BC had an easier time in the second round, routing Ohio State 63–48 to move onto its second Sweet Sixteen in as many years. The No. 7-seeded University of Minnesota scored a mild upset over the Eagles with a 76–63 win and eliminated BC from the tournament.

=== 2004–05 season ===
In its final year in the Big East the Boston College women's team finished the year at 20–10 with another trip to the NCAA's. In the regular season, BC finished a respectable 10–6 in conference play, but got bounced in its only game in the league tourney, losing 41–37 to Villanova. Then BC beat the University of Houston 65–43 in the first round of the NCAA tournament, but with a tough draw, were edged out by Duke 70–65.

=== 2005–06 season ===
Boston College entered the 2005–06 season as a participant of the Preseason NIT. Following a 51–44 win over Drexel and a 62–51 victory over Richmond, BC ran into and were stuffed by former Big East rival UConn 60–46 in the semifinal round. The women rebounded with 41-point win over Vermont, topping the Catamounts 79–38. Boston College entered league play with a 12–2 record and ranked no. 19 in the country, including a stunning win against then top-10 ranked Stanford University. In BC's first-ever ACC game, the women lost in overtime to Maryland 67–64. After a rough 0–4 start to ACC play, the Eagles bounced back to win seven straight games, including wins in six consecutive conference games. BC won its first-ever ACC game as a league member on January 26 when it downed Virginia 57–43. The Eagles then won at NC State on January 30, 75–66.

The winning streak came to an end when BC was confronted with two straight games against top-5 opponents. On February 16, No. 4 Maryland downed the Eagles 86–59; then the BC women fell again, losing to the No. 2 team in the country when North Carolina dropped Boston College on Tobacco Road, 69–62. The regular season ended on a sour note for Boston College as NC State and Florida State handed BC two more losses on February 24 and February 26 respectively, closing the regular season with four straight losses for the Eagles. The Boston College women stand at 19–11 overall (6–8 ACC) and are No. 25 in the coaches' poll as of March 7. BC senior forward Brooke Queenan was named All-ACC Second Team. Queenan led the Eagles with 14.8 points and 8.0 rebounds-per-game for BC in the regular season.

Boston College lost its first-round game in its first-ever ACC tournament as the No. 8 seed, falling to Virginia 57–54 on March 2. BC earned an at-large bid in the NCAA field. The Eagles received a No. 8 seed beat Notre Dame 78–61 following 17 days off between games. BC advanced to the field of 32 to face No. 1 seeded Ohio State, a team which had won twenty straight games coming in. The underdog Eagles beat the Buckeyes 79–69 largely behind the performance of BC guard Kindyll Dorsey, who scored a school NCAA tournament record six 3-pointers and 24 points overall. BC then lost to the No. 5 seeded Utah Utes in the Sweet Sixteen 57–54, missing three potential game-tying shots in the last 20 seconds.

After the season, forward Brooke Queenan was drafted by the New York Liberty of the WNBA in the second round, making her the third WNBA draft pick in BC history after Amber Jacobs and Cal Bouchard. Despite losing Queenan, All-ACC defensive teamer Aja Parham, and steady forward Lisa Macchia, BC headed into the offseason with a strong core of returning players including returning captain and point guard Sarah Marshall, senior guard Kindyll Dorsey, and senior center Kathrin Ress, as well as star incoming freshman, American Idol semifinalist, recording artist and McDonald's All-American Ayla Brown.

== Year by year results ==
Conference tournament winners noted with # Source

Season	Team	Overall	Conference	Standing	Postseason	Coaches' poll	AP poll
Maureen Enos (Independent) (1972–1976)
1972–73	Maureen Enos	4–6	–				
1973–74	Maureen Enos	9–4	–				
1974–75	Maureen Enos	8–7	–		MAIAW Tournament		
1975–76	Maureen Enos	11–8	–		EAIAW Invitational		
Maureen Enos:		32–25	–				
Mary Ellen Martin (Independent) (1976–1978)
1976–77	Mary Ellen Martin	7–12	–				
1977–78	Mary Ellen Martin	5–11	–				
Mary Ellen Martin:		12–23	–				
Carol Swindler (Independent) (1978–1980)
1978–79	Carol Swindler	5–15	–				
1979–80	Carol Swindler	11–12	–				
Carol Swindler:		16–27	–				
Margo Plotzke (Independent, Big East) (1980–1993)
1980–81	Margo Plotzke	12–11	–				
1981–82	Margo Plotzke	10–15	–				
Big East Conference (1979–2013)
1982–83	Margo Plotzke	17–9	2–6	8th			
1983–84	Margo Plotzke	11–16	2–6	T-7th			
1984–85	Margo Plotzke	19–9	11–5	3rd			
1985–86	Margo Plotzke	16–13	9–7	5th			
1986–87	Margo Plotzke	17–12	8–8	6th			
1987–88	Margo Plotzke	17–11	10–6	T-3rd			
1988–89	Margo Plotzke	15–13	9–7	T-4th			
1989–90	Margo Plotzke	16–13	9–7	4th			
1990–91	Margo Plotzke	12–16	6–10	6th			
1991–92	Margo Plotzke	5–23	3–15	10th			
1992–93	Margo Plotzke	10–17	4–14	T-9th			
Margo Plotzke:		177–178	73–91				
Cathy Inglese (Big East, ACC) (1993–2008)
1993–94	Cathy Inglese	13–14	9–9	5th			
1994–95	Cathy Inglese	6–21	3–15	10th			
1995–96	Cathy Inglese	10–17	7–11	T-4th (BE 6)			
1996–97	Cathy Inglese	18–10	13–5	3rd (BE 6)			
1997–98	Cathy Inglese	17–11	11–7	4th (BE 6)			
1998–99	Cathy Inglese	22–8	12–6	4th	NCAA Second Round		
1999–2000	Cathy Inglese	26–9	12–4	T-3rd	NCAA Second Round	17	17
2000–01	Cathy Inglese	14–15	7–9	7th			
2001–02	Cathy Inglese	23–8	12–4	T-3rd	NCAA First Round		21
2002–03	Cathy Inglese	22–9	12–4	T-3rd	NCAA Sweet Sixteen	17	25
2003–04	Cathy Inglese	27–7	11–5	T-4th	NCAA Sweet Sixteen	14	18
2004–05	Cathy Inglese	20–10	10–6	T-4th	NCAA Second Round	23	25
Atlantic Coast Conference
2005–06	Cathy Inglese	21–12	6–8	T-6th	NCAA Sweet Sixteen	19	
2006–07	Cathy Inglese	13–16	3–11	10th			
2007–08	Cathy Inglese	21–12	7–7	T-5th	WNIT Third Round		
Cathy Inglese:		273–179	119–85				
Sylvia Crawley (ACC) (2008–2012)
2008–09	Sylvia Crawley	23–12	7–7	7th	WNIT Semifinals		
2009–10	Sylvia Crawley	17–15	6–8	T-7th	Declined WNIT Invitation		
2010–11	Sylvia Crawley	20–12	5–9	T-7th	WNIT Third Round		
2011–12	Sylvia Crawley	7–23	2–14	T-11th			
Sylvia Crawley:		67–62	20–38				
Erik Johnson (ACC) (2012–2018)
2012–13	Erik Johnson	12–19	5–13	T-9th			
2013–14	Erik Johnson	12–19	3–13	T-14th			
2014–15	Erik Johnson	13–17	5–11	12th			
2015–16	Erik Johnson	15–16	2–14	14th			
2016–17	Erik Johnson	9–21	2–14	15th			
2017–18	Erik Johnson	7–23	2–14	T-13th			
Erik Johnson:		68–115	19–79				
Joanna Bernabei-McNamee (ACC) (2018–2026)
2018–19	Joanna Bernabei-McNamee	14–16	3–13	13th			
2019–20	Joanna Bernabei-McNamee	20–12	11–7	T–4th			
2020–21	Joanna Bernabei-McNamee	7–12	2–11	13th			
2021–22	Joanna Bernabei-McNamee	21–12	10–8	T–7th	WNIT Third Round		
2022–23	Joanna Bernabei-McNamee	16–17	5–13	T–11th			
2023–24	Joanna Bernabei-McNamee	14–19	5–13	T–12th			
2024–25	Joanna Bernabei-McNamee	16–18	6–12	T–12th	WBIT First Round		
2025–26	Joanna Bernabei-McNamee	5–26	1–17	T–17th			
Joanna Bernabei-McNamee:		113–132	43–94				
Total:		758–741 (.506)					
National champion Postseason invitational champion Conference regular season champion Conference regular season and conference tournament champion Division regular season champion Division regular season and conference tournament champion Conference tournament champion

== Postseason results ==
=== NCAA tournament results ===
The Eagles have appeared in the NCAA tournament seven times. Their combined record is 9–7.

Year	Seed	Round	Opponent	Result
1999	#8	First round Second Round	#9 Ohio State #1 Tennessee	W 72–59; L 89–62
2000	#5	First round Second Round	#12 Nebraska #4 Virginia	W 93–76; L 74–70
2002	#5	First round	#12 Mississippi State	L 65–59
2003	#5	First round Second Round; Sweet Sixteen	#12 Old Dominion #4 Vanderbilt #1 Connecticut	W 73–72; W 86–85; L 70–49
2004	#3	First round Second Round; Sweet Sixteen	#14 Eastern Michigan #6 Ohio State #7 Minnesota	W 58–56; W 63–48; L 76–63
2005	#7	First round Second Round	#10 Houston #2 Duke	W 65–43; L 70–65
2006	#8	First round Second Round; Sweet Sixteen	#9 Notre Dame #1 Ohio State #5 Utah	W 78–61; W 79–69; L 57–54

=== WNIT results ===
The Eagles have appeared in the Women's National Invitational Tournament (WNIT) four times. Their combined record is 8–4.

Year	Round	Opponent	Result
2008	Round 2 Round 3	Vermont; St. John's	W 75–64; L 65–56
2009	Round 2 Round 3 Quarterfinals; Semifinals	Boston University; St. John's; Georgetown; South Florida	W 68–53; W 68–64; W 65–56; L 65–82
2011	First round Second Round; Regional semifinals	Yale; St. Joseph's; Virginia	W 85–61; W 86–59; L 48–53
2022	First round Second Round; Third round	Maine; Quinnipiac; Columbia	W 69–44; W 94–68; L 51–54

=== WBIT results ===
The Eagles have appeared in the Women's Basketball Invitation Tournament (WBIT) one time. Their combined record is 0–1.

Year	Round	Opponent	Result
2025	First round	Villanova	L 70–76

== Retired numbers ==
Boston College Eagles retired numbers
No.	Player	Position	Career	Year of Retirement
30	Carolyn Swords	C	2007-11	2023
33	Sarah Behn	G/F	1989-93	2003

== Roster ==
2026–27 Boston College Eagles women's basketball team
Players
Coaches

Pos.	#	Name	Height	Year	Previous school	Hometown
G	0	Athena Tomlinson	5 ft 5 in (1.65 m)	Jr	Clovis West	Fresno, CA
F	1	Samantha Davis	6 ft 0 in (1.83 m)	Fr	Aquinas	La Crosse, WI
G/F	3	Natalia Hall-Rosa	6 ft 0 in (1.83 m)	So	The Rivers School; Seton Hall	Randolph, MA
G	4	Jocelyne Grier	5 ft 8 in (1.73 m)	So	Winston Salem Christian School	Charlotte, NC
F	10	Nora Arozena	6 ft 1 in (1.85 m)	Fr		Azkoitia, Spain
G	11	Daniele Paunksnyte	5 ft 10 in (1.78 m)	Fr	Vilnius Ozo gymnasium	Mazeikiai, Lithuania
F	13	Grace Oliver	6 ft 1 in (1.85 m)	Jr	Noble & Greenough School; Wake Forest	Norwell, MA
F	14	Eunicia Salgado	6 ft 1 in (1.85 m)	Fr	Royal Crown School	Boucherville, QC
G	15	Megan Hollingsworth	6 ft 0 in (1.83 m)	So	Capital Courts Academy; Pittsburgh	Ottawa, ON
C	17	Gabriela Bernal Ortellado	6 ft 3 in (1.91 m)	Fr	Edison Academics	Asunción, Paraguay
F	23	Nuria Ausaverri	6 ft 1 in (1.85 m)	Fr	Colegio San José del Parque	Madrid, Spain
F	33	Eleanor Trout	6 ft 3 in (1.91 m)	RS So	Templestowe College	Melbourne, Australia

Head coach

- Kate Popovec-Goss (Northwestern)

Assistant coach(es)

- Carrie Banks (Detroit Mercy)
- Ollie Goss (Bowling Green)
- JerShon Cobb (Northwestern)
- Stephanie Miller (Michigan State)
- Jahari Smith (Central Michigan)

Legend

- (C) Team captain
- (S) Suspended
- (I) Ineligible
- (W) Walk-on
- Injured
- Current redshirt

Roster
Last update: August 8, 2026
