= NC State Wolfpack women's basketball =

Women's college basketball team

2026-27 NC State Wolfpack women's basketball team
- University: North Carolina State University
- Head coach: Wes Moore (14th season)
- Location: Raleigh, North Carolina
- Arena: Reynolds Coliseum (capacity: 5,500)
- Conference: ACC
- Nickname: Wolfpack Women
- Colors: Red and white
- All-time record: 1027–494 (.675)

NCAA Division I tournament Final Four
- 1998, 2024
Other NCAA Division I tournament results
Elite Eight	1998, 2022, 2024
Sweet Sixteen	1982, 1984, 1985, 1987, 1989, 1990, 1991, 1995, 1998, 2001, 2007, 2018, 2019, 2021, 2022, 2024, 2025
Appearances	1978, 1980, 1981, 1982, 1983, 1984, 1985, 1986, 1987, 1989, 1990, 1991, 1995, 1996, 1997, 1998, 1999, 2000, 2001, 2004, 2005, 2006, 2007, 2010, 2014, 2017, 2018, 2019, 2021, 2022, 2023, 2024, 2025, 2026

AIAW tournament quarterfinals
- 1978
Other AIAW tournament results
Second round	1978, 1980, 1981
Appearances	1978, 1980, 1981

Conference tournament champions
- 1980, 1985, 1987, 1991, 2020, 2021, 2022

Conference regular-season champions
- 1978, 1980, 1983, 1985, 1990, 2022, 2025

Uniforms
Home	Away

The NC State Wolfpack women's basketball team represents North Carolina State University in NCAA Division I women's basketball.

== History ==
=== The early years (1974–1981) ===
The women's basketball team at NC State had its beginnings in 1974. Under first head coach Robert "Peanut" Doak, North Carolina State won the first game it played 57–45 over the Virginia Cavaliers on December 7, 1974, en route to an 11–4 final record.

Kay Yow, the former head coach of the Elon Phoenix, was hired July 1, 1975 as coordinator of women's athletics and women's basketball coach. Coach Yow began her legendary coaching career on December 6, 1975, and recorded her first win with the Wolfpack, a 68–64 triumph over the College of Charleston Cougars, on January 10, 1976. On January 27, 1976, the Wolfpack beat the North Carolina Tar Heels 68–58 in the first televised women's basketball game in North Carolina history. In her first season as the head coach, Yow led her squad to the quarterfinals of the 1976 National Women's Invitation Tournament.

The 1977–78 season was a breakout year for the women's basketball program. On January 12, 1978, the Wolfpack beat the #1 Wayland Baptist Flying Queens 98–86 for its first ever win over a number one ranked team. In addition, the team won the inaugural ACC regular season championship and advanced to the Elite Eight of the AIAW Tournament where Wayland Baptist avenged its earlier season loss to the Wolfpack. NC State was ranked third in the final AP Poll of the 1977–78 season, its highest final ranking in school history.

On February 10, 1980, the Wolfpack won its first ACC tournament championship with an 85–75 victory over the Maryland Terrapins. NC State finished the season undefeated in conference play, capturing the ACC regular season title as well. The Wolfpack advanced to the second round, which was the Sweet 16, of the AIAW Tournament in both 1980 and 1981, foreshadowing the success NC State would later enjoy in the NCAA Tournament.

=== A legend emerges (1981–2009) ===
The NCAA began sanctioning women's college basketball during the 1981–82 season, and on March 13, 1982, the Wolfpack defeated the Northwestern Wildcats 75–71 in its first NCAA Tournament game. The team won the regular season ACC title for the third time in school history in the 1982–83 season.

On November 26, 1983, Yow won her 200th career game with a 60–54 triumph over the Miami Hurricanes.

The 1984–85 season was a very successful season, with the Wolfpack women winning their fourth regular season and second ACC tournament championships. The Wolfpack defeated North Carolina 81–80 on March 3, 1985, to claim the ACC tournament title. NC State won its third ACC tournament title on March 2, 1987, with a 57–56 win over Virginia.

On February 18, 1988, Coach Yow defeated the Wake Forest Demon Deacons 62–61 to collect her 100th career ACC victory. During the offseason, Yow led the United States Olympic women's basketball team to a gold medal in the 1988 Olympics.

NC State won its fifth regular season ACC championship to date in the 1989–90 season.

The Wolfpack women set an ACC record for the most points scored in a game on December 8, 1990. NC State defeated the Western Carolina Catamounts 137–65 in a record that still stands today. On January 12, 1991, #3 NC State lost a triple-overtime game 123–120 to #2 Virginia. The 243 total points scored is an ACC record.

The Wolfpack captured its fourth of seven ACC tournament titles to date on March 4, 1991, by beating Clemson 84–61.

NC State made its deepest NCAA tournament run in 1998. On March 23, the Wolfpack defeated the Connecticut Huskies 60–52 to earn a berth in the Final Four. On March 27, North Carolina State took the floor in Kansas City to take on the Louisiana Tech Lady Techsters, but the team ultimately fell 84–65.

On January 24, 1999, Coach Yow became the second coach to achieve 200 career ACC wins with NC State's 85–60 victory at Wake Forest. NC State retired the first set of women's basketball jerseys in school history on February 13, 2000. Genia Beasley, Trudi Lacey, Chasity Melvin, Linda Page, Andrea Stinson, Trena Trice, and Susan Yow each had her jersey retired.

On June 10, 2000, Coach Yow was one of 24 players and coaches inducted into the second class of the Women's Basketball Hall of Fame, and on September 27, 2002, Yow was enshrined into the Naismith Basketball Hall of Fame.

Nine Wolfpack players, Genia Beasley, Summer Erb, Trudi Lacey, Rhonda Mapp, Chasity Melvin, Linda Page, Andrea Stinson, Trena Trice and Susan Yow, were named to the ACC's 50th anniversary women's basketball team on September 25, 2002. The nine players were the second most of all ACC schools.

Coach Yow recorded her 600th win at NC State on December 2, 2004, with a 65–36 win over the Seton Hall Pirates. On January 22, 2006, Coach Yow coached her 1,000th career game when NC State beat the Dartmouth Big Green 78–43. She was one of only four NCAA Division I basketball coaches to coach 1,000 games. On February 5, 2007, she became just the sixth coach in Division I women's basketball history to win 700 games with a 68–51 victory over the Florida State Seminoles. The Reynolds Coliseum floor was renamed "Kay Yow Court" on February 16, 2007. That night, the Wolfpack upset #2 North Carolina 72–65. On March 18, 2007, Yow recorded her 650th win at NC State with an 84–52 defeat of the Robert Morris Colonials.

Kay Yow died on January 24, 2009, after a 21-year battle with breast cancer. In her legendary career at NC State, she won almost 700 games, guided her teams to 20 NCAA tournaments, advanced to the Sweet 16 eleven times, and recorded 29 winning seasons.

=== Kellie Harper era (2009–2013) ===
On April 16, 2009, former Tennessee Lady Volunteers player and Western Carolina Catamounts head coach Kellie Harper was named the third head coach in NC State women's basketball history. Lady Volunteers head coach Pat Summitt said, "North Carolina State is getting a young and rising star in the game in Coach Kellie Jolly Harper. I am proud for Kellie. I expect she will do a great job in a very competitive conference – she has what it takes to be successful."

Coach Harper picked up her first win as the Wolfpack head coach on November 13, 2009, with an 87–71 win over the Florida International Golden Panthers.

Harper was fired on March 25, 2013, after a four-year record of 70–64.

=== Wes Moore era (2013–present) ===
Wes Moore, head coach at University of Tennessee-Chattanooga, was named as the fourth head coach in program history on April 4, 2013. Since his hiring, Coach Moore has led a resurgence in Women's Basketball at NC State.

In his first season at NC State (2013–14), Moore led the Wolfpack to a 25–8 record, a fourth-place finish in the ACC standings, and an NCAA Tournament appearance. For his efforts, he was named the ESPNW ACC Coach of the Year. After an 18-15 campaign in 2014-15 and a 20–11 season in 2015–16, Moore led the Wolfpack to the NCAA Tournament Round of 32 in 2016–17 with an impressive 23–9 record (12-4 ACC). On March 1, 2017, he earned the official ACC Coach of the Year honor in votes by both the league's Blue Ribbon Panel and head coaches, earning the first such honor in the 43-year history of the NC State women's basketball program. He was also named a Naismith Women's College Coach of the Year Semifinalist after authoring upsets of four top-15 teams throughout the season: No. 2 Notre Dame, at No. 6 Florida State, No. 12 Duke, and at No. 7 Louisville.

In 2019 Coach Moore was the runner-up for the AP National Coach of the Year award.

His 2017-2018 and 2018–2019 teams make back-to-back trips to the Sweet Sixteen round of the NCAA Tournament. His 2019–2020 team won the Wolfpacks first ACC Tournament Championship since 1991 with senior point guard Aislinn Konig being named the tournament MVP.

The 2020–2021 team spent the entire regular season ranked inside the top 10, most of which was spent in the top 5, achieving a high rank of #2, matching a school record for highest ranking. On December 3, 2020, the #8 NCSU women beat the #1 ranked South Carolina team in Columbia with a final score of 54–46. The team was ranked #4 when they also beat the #1 ranked Louisville team in Louisville on February 1, 2020, by a score of 74–60. This was the first time a women's college basketball team has beaten a top ranked team twice in a season on the road. The team only experienced two losses in the regular season, both of which were away games which were later avenged with home wins. The team went into the conference tournament as the #2 seed and repeated as ACC Tournament Champions on March 7, 2021, beating the top seeded Louisville Cardinals 58–56. Junior Center Elissa Cunane was named the tournament MVP after averaging 23.3 points per game and 9.0 rebounds per game for the tournament. In their semifinal game against the #3 seeded Georgia Tech Yellow Jackets, the team overcame a 10-point deficit in the 4th quarter to win by a final score of 66–61. For the 2021 NCAA tournament, the team earned the program's first ever #1 seed. The Wolfpack advanced to the Sweet Sixteen before falling to fourth-seed Indiana.

In 2021–22, the team improved upon their regular season rankings and spent the entire season ranked in the top 5. They began the season by losing to #1 ranked South Carolina on November 9, 2021, but they would later defeat #2 ranked Maryland on November 25, 2021, by eighteen points. They again reached the #2 national ranking, but could not eclipse South Carolina for the #1 spot. They finished the ACC season 17–1 and won their first regular season conference championship since 1990. They followed up that regular season performance by winning the ACC Tournament for the third time in a row. They were again a first seed in the 2022 NCAA tournament, defeating Longwood, Kansas State, and Notre Dame on the way to the Elite Eight. This was the programs' second Elite Eight appearance in its history. The Wolfpack could not overcome UConn and lost in double overtime to end their season. NC State was the only #1 seed to not qualify for the Final Four that year.

In 2022–23, NC State underperformed, going 20–12 overall and 9–9 in the ACC. They still made the NCAA Tournament, although they were upset by Princeton in the First Round.

In 2023–24, NC State made it to the ACC Tournament Championship, losing to Notre Dame. In the NCAA Tournament, they earned a 3-seed and upset 2-seeded Stanford 77–67 to reach the Elite Eight in the Portland regional. There, they upset 1-seeded Texas 76–66 to advance to the school's second Final Four (and first since 1998). Hours later, the men's team also reached the Final Four with a 76–64 upset win over rival Duke. This marked the first time that both the NC State men's and women's teams have made the Final Four in the same season. In the Final Four, the Wolfpack Women lost 78–59 to the eventual national champion South Carolina.

== Year-by-year results ==
Conference tournament winners noted with #.

Season	Team	Overall	Conference	Standing	Postseason	Coaches' poll	AP poll
Robert R. "Peanut" Doak (Independent) (1974–1975)
1974–75	Robert R. "Peanut" Doak	11–4	–		State Class B Tournament		
Robert R. "Peanut" Doak:		11–4	–				
Kay Yow (Independent, Atlantic Coast Conference) (1975–2009)
1975–76	Kay Yow	19–7	–		NWIT Sixth Place		
1976–77	Kay Yow	21–3	–		AIAW Region II Tournament		10
Atlantic Coast Conference
1977–78	Kay Yow	29–5	9–0	1st	AIAW Elite Eight		3
1978–79	Kay Yow	27–7	7–2	2nd	AIAW Region II Tournament		11
1979–80	Kay Yow	28–8	9–0	1st	AIAW Sweet Sixteen		10
1980–81	Kay Yow	21–10	7–2	T-1st	AIAW Sweet Sixteen		13
1981–82	Kay Yow	24–7	12–4	2nd	NCAA Sweet Sixteen		12
1982–83	Kay Yow	22–8	12–1	1st	NCAA First Round		16
1983–84	Kay Yow	23–9	9–5	T-3rd	NCAA Sweet Sixteen		16
1984–85	Kay Yow	25–6	13–1	1st#	NCAA Sweet Sixteen		12
1985–86	Kay Yow	18–11	9–5	T-3rd	NCAA Second Round (Bye)		
1986–87	Kay Yow	24–7	11–3	2nd#	NCAA Sweet Sixteen	12	13
1987–88	Kay Yow	10–17	3–11	T-7th			
1988–89	Kay Yow	24–7	12–2	2nd	NCAA Sweet Sixteen	10	13
1989–90	Kay Yow	25–6	12–2	1st	NCAA Sweet Sixteen	10	11
1990–91	Kay Yow	27–6	9–5	T-2nd#	NCAA Sweet Sixteen	10	7
1991–92	Kay Yow	16–12	7–9	6th			
1992–93	Kay Yow	14–13	8–8	T-4th			
1993–94	Kay Yow	13–14	6–10	6th			
1994–95	Kay Yow	21–10	11–5	3rd	NCAA Sweet Sixteen	19	24
1995–96	Kay Yow	20–10	10–6	3rd	NCAA Second Round		23
1996–97	Kay Yow	19–12	9–7	T-3rd	NCAA First Round		
1997–98	Kay Yow	25–7	12–4	T-2nd	NCAA Final Four	4	10
1998–99	Kay Yow	17–12	9–7	5th	NCAA Second Round		
1999–2000	Kay Yow	20–9	11–5	3rd	NCAA First Round	23	23
2000–01	Kay Yow	22–11	9–7	T-3rd	NCAA Sweet Sixteen	16	19
2001–02	Kay Yow	14–15	7–9	T-5th			
2002–03	Kay Yow	11–17	6–10	6th			
2003–04	Kay Yow	17–15	8–8	T-3rd	NCAA First Round		
2004–05	Kay Yow	21–8	10–4	3rd	NCAA First Round		21
2005–06	Kay Yow	19–12	7–7	5th	NCAA First Round		
2006–07	Kay Yow	25–10	10–4	T-3rd	NCAA Sweet Sixteen	12	18
2007–08	Kay Yow	21–13	6–8	8th	WNIT Semifinals		
2008–09	Kay Yow	8–7	0–0				
Kay Yow:		680–325	280–161				
Stephanie Glance (Atlantic Coast Conference) (2006–2008)
2006–07	Stephanie Glance	10–6	–			12	18
2008–09	Stephanie Glance	5–10	5–9	T-8th			
Stephanie Glance:		15–16	5–9				
Kellie Harper (Atlantic Coast Conference) (2010–2014)
2009–10	Kellie Harper	20–14	7–7	T-6th	NCAA First Round		
2010–11	Kellie Harper	14–17	4–10	10th			
2011–12	Kellie Harper	19–16	5–11	9th	WNIT Second Round		
2012–13	Kellie Harper	17–17	7–11	T-7th	WNIT Second Round		
Kellie Harper:		70–64	23–39				
Wes Moore (Atlantic Coast Conference) (2013–present)
2013–14	Wes Moore	25–8	11–5	4th	NCAA First Round	16	21
2014–15	Wes Moore	18–15	7–9	10th	WNIT Third Round		
2015–16	Wes Moore	20–11	10–6	6th	Declined WNIT Invitation		
2016–17	Wes Moore	23–9	12–4	T–4th	NCAA Second Round	17	17
2017–18	Wes Moore	26–9	11–5	T–4th	NCAA Sweet Sixteen	21	16
2018–19	Wes Moore	28–6	12–4	T–3rd	NCAA Sweet Sixteen	10	9
2019–20	Wes Moore	28–4	14–4	2nd	Postseason cancelled (Note: Due to the COVID-19 pandemic, the 2020 NCAA tournament was cancelled entirely.)	8	8
2020–21	Wes Moore	22–3	13–2	2nd	NCAA Sweet Sixteen	3	7
2021–22	Wes Moore	32–4	17–1	1st	NCAA Elite Eight	5	3
2022–23	Wes Moore	20–12	9–9	T-8th	NCAA First Round		
2023–24	Wes Moore	31–7	13–5	T-2nd	NCAA Final Four	4	4
2024–25	Wes Moore	28–6	13–5	T-1st	NCAA Sweet Sixteen	9	10
2025–26	Wes Moore	21–11	13–5	4th	NCAA Second Round		
Wes Moore:		322–106 (.752)	158–61 (.721)				
Total:		1075–511 (.678)					
National champion Postseason invitational champion Conference regular season champion Conference regular season and conference tournament champion Division regular season champion Division regular season and conference tournament champion Conference tournament champion

== Postseason results ==
=== NCAA Division I ===
NC State has appeared in the NCAA Division I women's basketball tournament 31 times. They have a record of 36–31.

Year	Seed	Round	Opponent	Result
1982	#3	Second Round; Sweet Sixteen	#6 Northwestern #2 Cheyney	W 75–71; L 76–68
1983	#4	Second Round	#5 Penn State	L 94–80
1984	#4	Second Round; Sweet Sixteen	#5 Virginia #1 Old Dominion	W 86–73; L 73–71 (OT)
1985	#4	Second Round; Sweet Sixteen	#5 St. Joseph's #1 Old Dominion	W 67–63; L 77–67
1986	#6	Second Round	#3 Penn State	L 63–59
1987	#3	Second Round; Sweet Sixteen	#6 Villanova #2 Rutgers	W 68–67; L 75–60
1989	#2	Second Round; Sweet Sixteen	#7 Rutgers #3 Ole Miss	W 75–73; L 68–63
1990	#2	Second Round; Sweet Sixteen	#10 Michigan #3 Texas	W 81–64; L 72–63
1991	#2	Second Round; Sweet Sixteen	#10 George Washington #3 Connecticut	W 94–83; L 82–71
1995	#7	First Round; Second Round; Sweet Sixteen	#10 Marquette #2 Penn State #3 Georgia	W 77–62; W 76–74; L 98–71
1996	#5	First Round; Second Round	#12 Montana #4 Alabama	W 77–68; L 88–68
1997	#8	First Round	#9 Iowa	L 56–50
1998	#4	First Round; Second Round; Sweet Sixteen; Elite Eight; Final Four	#13 Maine #12 Youngstown State #1 Old Dominion #2 Connecticut #3 Louisiana Tech	W 89–64; W 81–61; W 74–72; W 60–52; L 84–65
1999	#10	First Round; Second Round	#7 Mississippi State #2 Texas Tech	W 76–57; L 85–78
2000	#5	First Round	#12 SMU	L 64–63
2001	#4	First Round; Second Round; Sweet Sixteen	#13 Delaware #5 Villanova #1 Connecticut	W 76–57; W 68–64; L 72–58
2004	#10	First Round	#7 Auburn	L 79–59
2005	#5	First Round	#12 Middle Tennessee State	L 60–58
2006	#5	First Round	#12 Tulsa	L 71–61
2007	#4	First Round; Second Round; Sweet Sixteen	#13 Robert Morris #5 Baylor #1 Connecticut	W 84–52; W 78–72 (OT); L 78–71
2010	#9	First Round	#8 UCLA	L 74–54
2014	#5	First Round	#12 BYU	L 72–57
2017	#6	First Round; Second Round	#11 Auburn #3 Texas	W 62–48; L 84–80
2018	#4	First Round; Second Round; Sweet Sixteen	#13 Elon #5 Maryland #1 Mississippi State	W 62–35; W 74–60; L 71–57
2019	#3	First Round; Second Round; Sweet Sixteen	#14 Maine #6 Kentucky #2 Iowa	W 63–51; W 72–57; L 79–61
2021	#1	First Round; Second Round; Sweet Sixteen	#16 North Carolina A&T #8 South Florida #4 Indiana	W 79–58; W 79–67; L 70–73
2022	#1	First Round; Second Round; Sweet Sixteen; Elite Eight	#16 Longwood #9 Kansas State #5 Notre Dame #2 Connecticut	W 96–68; W 89–57; W 66–63; L 87–91 (2OT)
2023	#7	First Round	#10 Princeton	L 63–64
2024	#3	First Round; Second Round; Sweet Sixteen; Elite Eight; Final Four	#14 Chattanooga #6 Tennessee #2 Stanford #1 Texas #1 South Carolina	W 64–45; W 79–72; W 77–67; W 76–66; L 59–78
2025	#2	First Round; Second Round; Sweet Sixteen	#15 Vermont #7 Michigan State #3 LSU	W 75–55; W 83–49; L 73–80
2026	#7	First Round; Second Round	#10 Tennessee #2 Michigan	W 76–61; L 63–92

=== AIAW Division I ===
The Wolfpack made three appearances in the AIAW women's basketball tournament, with a combined record of 3–3.

Year	Round	Opponent	Result
1978	First Round; Quarterfinals	Missouri; Wayland Baptist	W 70–64; L, 55–72
1980	First Round; Second Round	Detroit; Long Beach State	W 70–61; L, 72–86
1981	First Round; Second Round	Georgia State; Cheyney State	W 95–86; L, 72–88

== Roster ==
2026–27 NC State Wolfpack women's basketball team
Players
Coaches

Pos.	#	Name	Height	Year	Previous school	Hometown
G	2	Qadence Samuels	6 ft 0 in (1.83 m)	Sr	UConn	Forestville, MD
G	7	Ky'She Lunan	5 ft 10 in (1.78 m)	So	Millennium	Goodyear, AZ
G	10	Adelaide Jernigan	5 ft 11 in (1.8 m)	So	Bishop McGuinness	Winston-Salem, NC
F	11	Maddie Cox	6 ft 2 in (1.88 m)	Sr	Flower Mound	Flower Mound, TX
F	12	Khamil Pierre	6 ft 2 in (1.88 m)	Sr	Perry	Phoenix, AZ
G	35	Zoe Brooks	5 ft 10 in (1.78 m)	Sr	St. John Vianney	Plainfield, NJ
G	tbd	Kamora Pruitt	6 ft 2 in (1.88 m)	Fr	Legion Prep	St. Louis, MO
F	tbd	Annsley Trivette	6 ft 3 in (1.91 m)	Fr	Abingdon	Abingdon, VA
F	tbd	Khady Leye	6 ft 2 in (1.88 m)	Jr	Auburn	Louga, Senegal
G	tbd	Desiree Wooten	5 ft 8 in (1.73 m)	GS	Colorado	Dallas, TX
G	tbd	Audrey Ericksen	6 ft 0 in (1.83 m)	Sr	Boston University	Cary, NC
F	tbd	Favour Ossai	6 ft 2 in (1.88 m)	Fr	Fukushima Tōryō	Delta State, Nigeria

Head coach

- Wes Moore (Johnson)

Assistant coach(es)

- Nikki West (AHC) (Clemson)
- Ashley Williams (NC State)
- Brittany Morris (Seton Hall)
- Kevin Leatherwood (Carson–Newman)
- Kayla Jones (NC State)

Legend

- (C) Team captain
- (S) Suspended
- (I) Ineligible
- (W) Walk-on
- Injured
- Current redshirt

Roster
Last update: August 30, 2026
