= 1997–98 Louisiana Tech Lady Techsters basketball team =

1997-98 Louisiana Tech women's basketball season

1997–98 Louisiana Tech Lady Techsters basketball

Sun Belt regular season champion Sun Belt tournament champion

NCAA tournament, Runner-Up
- Conference: Sun Belt Conference

Ranking
- Coaches: No. 2
- AP: No. 4
- Record: 31–4 (13–1 Sun Belt Conference)
- Head coach: Leon Barmore (16th season)
- Assistant coach: Kim Mulkey
- Home arena: Thomas Assembly Center

1997–98 Sun Belt Conference women's basketball standings
	Conf.				Overall
Team	W		L	PCT	W		L	PCT
No. 4 Louisiana Tech †	13	–	1	.929	31	–	4	.886
No. 15 Western Kentucky	12	–	2	.857	26	–	9	.743
Arkansas State	11	–	3	.786	20	–	10	.667
New Orleans	7	–	7	.500	12	–	16	.429
Louisiana–Lafayette	7	–	7	.500	9	–	18	.333
South Alabama	4	–	10	.286	7	–	20	.259
Lamar	2	–	12	.143	5	–	22	.185
Texas-Pan American	0	–	14	.000	1	–	26	.037
† 1998 Sun Belt tournament winner

The 1997–98 Louisiana Tech Lady Techsters basketball team represented Louisiana Tech University during the 1997–98 NCAA Division I women's basketball season. The team was led by head coach Leon Barmore, who guided the team to a 31–4 record and a runner-up finish at the 1998 NCAA tournament. This was the program's sixth appearance in the NCAA championship game. The team played their home games at the Thomas Assembly Center in Ruston, Louisiana as a member of the Sun Belt Conference.

== Roster ==
1997–98 Louisiana Tech Lady Techsters women's basketball team
Players
Coaches

Pos.	#	Name	Height	Year	Hometown
G		LaQuan Stallworth	5 ft 7 in (1.7 m)	Jr	Silsbee, Texas
C		Alisa Burras	6 ft 3 in (1.91 m)	Sr
F	21	Monica Maxwell	5 ft 9 in (1.75 m)	Jr
F	30	Amanda Wilson	6 ft 0 in (1.83 m)	Jr
G	35	Tamicha Jackson	5 ft 5 in (1.65 m)	So	Dallas, Texas

Head coach

- Leon Barmore

Assistant coach(es)

- Kim Mulkey

Legend

- (C) Team captain
- (S) Suspended
- (I) Ineligible
- (W) Walk-on
- Injured
- Current redshirt

== Schedule and results ==
Date time, TV	Rank^{#}	Opponent^{#}	Result	Record	Site (attendance) city, state
Regular season
Nov 21, 1997*	No. 2	at No. 1 Tennessee	L 61–75	0–1	Thompson-Boling Arena (16,490); Knoxville, Tennessee
Nov 24, 1997*	No. 2	Texas–Arlington	W 83–38	1–1	Thomas Assembly Center; Ruston, Louisiana
Dec 6, 1997*	No. 4	vs. Iowa; Central Fidelity Invite	W 83–58	4–1	Richmond Coliseum; Richmond, Virginia
Dec 7, 1997*	No. 4	vs. No. 2 Old Dominion; Central Fidelity Invite	L 65–88	4–2	Richmond Coliseum; Richmond, Virginia
Dec 13, 1997*	No. 4	Florida State	W 86–60	5–2	Thomas Assembly Center; Ruston, Louisiana
Jan 21, 1998*	No. 4	Penn State	W 88–58	15–2	Thomas Assembly Center; Ruston, Louisiana
Jan 25, 1998	No. 4	at No. 16 Western Kentucky	L 86–88	15–3 (5–1)	E. A. Diddle Arena; Bowling Green, Kentucky
Feb 28, 1998	No. 4	at New Orleans	W 98–61	23–3 (13–1)	Lakefront Arena; New Orleans, Louisiana
Sun Belt tournament
Mar 5, 1998*	(1) No. 4	(8) Texas-Pan American	W 92–56	24–3	Thomas Assembly Center; Ruston, Louisiana
Mar 6, 1998*	(1) No. 4	(4) New Orleans	W 91–54	25–3	Thomas Assembly Center; Ruston, Louisiana
Mar 7, 1998*	(1) No. 4	(2) No. 15 Western Kentucky	W 69–68	26–3	Thomas Assembly Center; Ruston, Louisiana
NCAA tournament
Mar 14, 1998*	(3 MW) No. 4	(14 MW) Holy Cross; First round	W 86–58	27–3	Thomas Assembly Center; Ruston, Louisiana
Mar 16, 1998*	(3 MW) No. 4	(6 MW) No. 14 Clemson; Second round	W 74–52	28–3	Thomas Assembly Center; Ruston, Louisiana
Mar 21, 1998*	(3 MW) No. 4	vs. (2 MW) No. 11 Alabama; Regional Semifinal – Sweet Sixteen	W 71–57	29–3	Lubbock Municipal Coliseum; Lubbock, Texas
Mar 23, 1998*	(3 MW) No. 4	vs. (4 MW) No. 21 Purdue; Regional Final – Elite Eight	W 72–65	30–3	Lubbock Municipal Coliseum; Lubbock, Texas
Mar 27, 1998*	(3 MW) No. 4	vs. (4 E) No. 10 NC State; National Semifinal – Final Four	W 84–65	31–3	Kemper Arena (17,976); Kansas City, Missouri
Mar 29, 1998*	(3 MW) No. 4	vs. (1 ME) No. 1 Tennessee; National Championship	L 75–93	31–4	Kemper Arena (17,976); Kansas City, Missouri
*Non-conference game. ^{#}Rankings from AP Poll. (#) Tournament seedings in parentheses. MW=Midwest. All times are in Central.

== Rankings ==
Ranking movements Legend: ██ Increase in ranking ██ Decrease in ranking
	Week																		
Poll	Pre	1	2	3	4	5	6	7	8	9	10	11	12	13	14	15	16	17	Final
AP	2	2	4	4	4	4	4	4	4	4	4	4	4	4	4	4	4	4	Not released
Coaches	2	2	3	3	4	4	4	4	4	4	4	4	4	4	4	4	4	4	2

^Coaches did not release a Week 2 poll.
