= 1997–98 Arkansas Razorbacks women's basketball team =

Intercollegiate basketball season

1997–98 Arkansas Razorbacks women's basketball

NCAA tournament West Regional champions

NCAA tournament, Final Four
- Conference: Southeastern Conference

Ranking
- Coaches: No. 4
- Record: 22–11 (7–7 SEC)
- Head coach: Gary Blair (5th season)
- Home arena: Bud Walton Arena

1997–98 SEC women's basketball standings
	Conf.				Overall
Team	W		L	PCT	W		L	PCT
No. 1 Tennessee^{†}	14	–	0	1.000	39	–	0	1.000
No. 13 Florida	10	–	4	.714	23	–	9	.719
No. 11 Alabama	10	–	4	.714	24	–	10	.706
No. 18 Vanderbilt	9	–	5	.643	20	–	9	.690
Georgia	8	–	6	.571	17	–	11	.607
LSU	7	–	7	.500	19	–	13	.594
Arkansas	7	–	7	.500	22	–	11	.667
Kentucky	5	–	9	.357	13	–	15	.464
Mississippi State	4	–	10	.286	14	–	15	.483
Auburn	4	–	10	.286	16	–	11	.593
South Carolina	3	–	11	.214	13	–	15	.464
Ole Miss	3	–	11	.214	12	–	19	.387
† 1998 SEC tournament winner Rankings from AP poll

The 1997–98 Arkansas Razorbacks women's basketball team represented the University of Arkansas during the 1997-98 NCAA Division I women's basketball season. They were led by head coach and Gary Blair. They finished the season 22–11, 7–7 in SEC play. The Razorbacks won the West Regional and advanced to the Final Four of the NCAA tournament for the first and, so far, only time in program history.

== Roster ==
1997–98 Arkansas Razorbacks women's basketball team
Players
Coaches

Pos.	#	Name	Height	Year	Previous school	Hometown
G	10	Christy Smith	5 ft 7 in (1.7 m)	Sr
G	20	Wendi Willits	5 ft 8 in (1.73 m)	Fr
G	30	Sytia Messer	5 ft 8 in (1.73 m)	Jr
F	34	Karyn Karlin	6 ft 1 in (1.85 m)	So

Head coach

- Gary Blair (Arkansas)

Assistant coach(es)

Legend

- (C) Team captain
- (S) Suspended
- (I) Ineligible
- (W) Walk-on
- Injured
- Current redshirt

Roster

== Schedule ==
Date time, TV	Rank^{#}	Opponent^{#}	Result	Record	Site (attendance) city, state
Regular season
SEC Tournament
NCAA Tournament
Mar 14, 1998*	(9 W)	vs. (8 W) Hawaii; First round	W 76–70	19–10	Maples Pavilion; Stanford, California
Mar 16, 1998*	(9 W)	vs. (16 W) Harvard; Second round	W 82–64	20–10	Maples Pavilion; Stanford, California
Mar 21, 1998*	(9 W)	vs. (5 W) Kansas; Regional Semifinal – Sweet Sixteen	W 79–63	21–10	The Arena in Oakland; Oakland, California
Mar 23, 1998*	(9 W)	vs. (2 W) No. 8 Duke; Regional Final – Elite Eight	W 77–72	22–10	The Arena in Oakland; Oakland, California
Mar 27, 1998*	(9 W)	vs. (1 ME) No. 1 Tennessee; National Semifinal – Final Four	L 58–86	22–11	Kemper Arena (17,976); Kansas City, Missouri
*Non-conference game. ^{#}Rankings from AP Polls. (#) Tournament seedings in parentheses. All times are in Central Time.

== See also ==
- 1997–98 Arkansas Razorbacks men's basketball team
