= Len Garrett =

American football player (born 1947)

No. 88, 83, 82
- Position: Tight end

Personal information
- Born: December 18, 1947 (age 78); Silsbee, Texas, U.S.
- Listed height: 6 ft 3 in (1.91 m)
- Listed weight: 230 lb (104 kg)

Career information
- High school: Waldo Mathew (Silsbee, Texas)
- College: New Mexico Highlands (1967–1970)
- NFL draft: 1971: 15th round, 374th overall pick

Career history
- Green Bay Packers (1971–1973); New Orleans Saints (1973–1975); San Francisco 49ers (1975)

Career NFL statistics
- Games played: 55
- Receptions: 6
- Receiving yards: 96
- Stats at Pro Football Reference

Leonard Neal Garrett (born December 18, 1947) is an American former professional football player. A tight end, he played college football for the New Mexico Highlands Cowboys, earning honorable mention National Association of Intercollegiate Athletics (NAIA) All-American honors in 1969. He was selected by the Green Bay Packers of the National Football League (NFL) in the 15th round of the 1971 NFL draft and played three seasons for them, serving as their starting tight end in 1972. Garrett was traded to the New Orleans Saints mid-season in 1973 and played with them until 1975. He concluded his career with the San Francisco 49ers. After football, Garrett worked in academics, holding positions at Southeastern Louisiana University, Baton Rouge Community College, Louisiana Technical College, and Dallas College Mountain View.

== Early life ==
Garrett was born on December 18, 1947, in Silsbee, Texas. He was the third child and oldest boy of eight children born to his parents. His family grew up poor and had a small house without plumbing, and the eight children slept in two small rooms. In his memoir, A Man Called Graveyard, Garrett recalled eating only two simple meals a day and said that he was unaware of the "luxury" of tooth brushing until fifth or sixth grade. He said that his father beat his mother on a daily basis for years, until one day she packed her belongings in a suitcase, took her youngest child and left the family, telling Garrett, then aged five, that he was to be the new leader of the family. Garrett's father worked long hours each day, and thus Garrett ran the household when his father was away.

As he grew up, Garrett received his education in Silsbee. He attended Waldo Mathew High School, Silsbee's high school for black students, as the town maintained school segregation. At Waldo Mathew, he competed in football and basketball, receiving varsity letters in both sports in all four years. When he first tried out for the football team as a freshman in 1962, he had no knowledge of the positions and had never seen a game before. He recalled being placed at tackle to begin his football career and made the team despite his inexperience. He helped the team to a runner-up finish at the district championship in his freshman year and won the district title as a junior.

After high school, Garrett joined a Job Corps program in Grants, New Mexico. While there, he received his nickname "Graveyard", after a friend told him: "You have this sad look on your face all the time. You remind me of a lonely graveyard". He joined a Job Corps football team and recalled that his athletic ability impressed his advisor, who helped him visit several colleges in hopes of playing college football. He eventually enrolled at New Mexico Highlands University (NMHU) in Las Vegas, New Mexico, in 1967.

== College career ==
Garrett joined the New Mexico Highlands Cowboys football team, a member of the National Association of Intercollegiate Athletics (NAIA), as a freshman in 1967. He played as a tight end and the Las Vegas Optic that year described him as showing "excellent toughness and a good attitude". He was a backup to Kent Hiner at tight end and was also used on special teams, being a member of an NMHU team that compiled a 9–0 regular season record before a loss in the NAIA semifinals. The following year, after Hiner's graduation, Garrett won a starting role. He helped the Cowboys to a perfect record of 9–0 and a first-place national ranking, being named the team's offensive lineman of the week after a game in which he "blocked ferociously" and scored two touchdowns. However, due to actions by the NMHU basketball team, the school was placed on probation by the NAIA and thus was ineligible to compete in the 1968 playoffs despite being ranked number one in the nation.

Garrett continued starting during the 1969 season. He was one of their leading receivers and finished with 21 catches for 229 yards, averaging 10.9 yards per catch while gaining 28.6 yards per game. He helped the Cowboys to an undefeated regular season record of 8–0–1 before a loss in the NAIA semifinals, earning honorable mention NAIA All-America honors from the Associated Press as well as selection to the All-NAIA District 7 team. As a senior at NMHU in 1970, Garrett played alongside his brother Reggie, also a future NFL player. He helped the 1970 Cowboys compile a record of 9–2 with a fifth-place finish in the final NAIA rankings. The Las Vegas Optic described him as showing great blocking skills during his college career, stating that "Graveyard Garrett sent many an opponent looking for a tombstone while demonstrating some of that blocking ability and willingness to hit." Garrett graduated from New Mexico Highlands in 1971 and was later inducted into the school's hall of fame in 2001.

== Professional career ==
Garrett was selected by the Green Bay Packers in the 15th round (374th overall) of the 1971 NFL draft. Impressing the coaching staff with his blocking ability, he made the final roster over former starter John Hilton. He became the backup tight end to Rich McGeorge and was a member of most special teams units. While Cliff Christl in the Herald-Times-Reporter noted that many players disliked "the hazardous chore of special team employment", Garrett said that "I enjoy it and look forward to going down and hitting someone". The Green Bay Press-Gazette described him as "a highly physical performer who is invariably to be found around the ball while toiling on the special teams". He ended up appearing in all 14 games for the Packers in 1971 as a backup and special teams player, as the team compiled a record of 4–8–2.

Early in the 1972 season, Garrett was thrust into a starting position after McGeorge suffered a season-ending injury. In a game against the Chicago Bears, he caught a touchdown pass that was called back due to a holding penalty. He started 12 games during the 1972 season and caught four passes for 66 yards. The 1972 Packers placed first in their division with a record of 10–4 before losing in the divisional round of the playoffs to the Washington Redskins. In the offseason, Garrett worked as an assistant to his former NMHU coach John Levra with the Stephen F. Austin Lumberjacks, coaching the wide receivers and tight ends.

Garrett began the 1973 season as a backup tight end, but still saw significant playing time in the first two games. After the first two games, he was traded to the New Orleans Saints in exchange for an NFL draft pick. He appeared in the last 12 games of the season for the Saints, starting five and totaling two catches for 30 yards. He appeared in 10 games as a backup the next year, with the Saints compiling records of 5–9 in both seasons. In the offseasons when he was a member of the Saints, Garrett worked as a part-time teacher in the Jefferson Parish School System. He was one of four tight ends competing for a spot on the Saints in 1975. Although he initially made the team, he was released after the first game.

After being released by the Saints, Garrett received interest from the Philadelphia Bell and the San Antonio Wings of the World Football League (WFL). He flew in to meet with the Wings, but described being unimpressed with the league and did not sign, although he stayed to watch the team's practices that week. Shortly before a game against the Bell, the Wings coach offered him a contract, which Garrett said he refused to sign after hearing other players complain of not being paid. Despite this, he was convinced to travel to their next game against the Bell. He said that "I really didn't want to risk myself playing for no money, with no insurance and no contract. But I was there and had no way out. So I suited up and stood on the sidelines all night." After the team told players that they were not going to be paid until the next season, Garrett decided "I was out", and the league folded the next week. Toward the end of the year, he signed with the San Francisco 49ers in the NFL and played in two games as a backup. Garrett was initially re-signed for the 1976 season, but was released in training camp, ending his professional career.

== Personal life and post-football career ==
Garrett had a daughter and a son with his first wife, Stella; they divorced after the 1973 football season. He met his second wife, Carolyn, on a blind date, and had a daughter with her.

After his football career, Garrett returned to NMHU and received a degree in 1977. In 1978, he became a teacher and assistant coach at Capitol High School in Baton Rouge, Louisiana. He worked a summer at Louisiana State University (LSU) in 1979 as a counselor and advisor, then worked for the United States Census Bureau in 1980 as a coordinator.

In 1980, Garrett became director of student support services at Southeastern Louisiana University (SLU). He later became director of developmental education and assistant dean of student life. He was named chief student affairs officer in 1987 and in 1989, became acting dean of students, later being named full-time dean of students in 1990. In 1992, Garrett earned a doctorate of education from the University of Southern Mississippi. After 17 years at SLU, he left the college in 1996 when the new president, Sally Clausen, hired someone else to take his position as dean of students. Afterwards, he joined Baton Rouge Community College as vice president for student and administrative services. He worked at Baton Rouge until the chancellor fired the entire administrative staff in 1999. Garrett later served in the Louisiana Technical College system, becoming interim chancellor of several campuses in September 2002 before announcing his retirement within a few years. However, he later returned to the education field, joining Dallas College Mountain View in 2007 as vice president of student services and enrollment management services, serving there until his retirement in 2020.

In 2021, Garrett wrote an autobiography titled A Man Called Graveyard: The Inspirational Journey of Leonard Graveyard Garrett.
