= Reggie Garrett =

American football player (born 1951)

No. 86
- Position: Wide receiver

Personal information
- Born: November 21, 1951 (age 74); Silsbee, Texas, U.S.
- Listed height: 6 ft 1 in (1.85 m)
- Listed weight: 174 lb (79 kg)

Career information
- High school: Waldo Mathew (Silsbee)
- College: Eastern Michigan
- NFL draft: 1974: undrafted

Career history
- Pittsburgh Steelers (1974–1975)

Awards and highlights
- 2× Super Bowl champion (IX, X)

Career NFL statistics
- Receiving yards: 178
- Receptions: 13
- Receiving TDs: 1
- Games played: 28
- Stats at Pro Football Reference

Reginald Weldon Garrett (born November 21, 1951) is an American former professional football player who was a wide receiver for three seasons with the Pittsburgh Steelers in the National Football League (NFL). He played college football for the Eastern Michigan Eagles. He is currently the safety and security manager at U.S. Foods in Perth Amboy, New Jersey.

== Early life ==
Reggie Garrett was born in Silsbee, Texas, and attended Waldo Mathew High School (now Silsbee High School). He studied at New Mexico Highlands University and graduated from Eastern Michigan University.
