= 1997–98 Tennessee Lady Volunteers basketball team =

Intercollegiate basketball season

1997–98 Tennessee Lady Volunteers basketball

NCAA tournament National Champions SEC Tournament champions SEC regular season champions Northern Lights Invitational champions Big Apple Classic champions
- Conference: Southeastern Conference

Ranking
- Coaches: No. 1
- AP: No. 1
- Record: 39–0 (14–0 SEC)
- Head coach: Pat Summitt (24th season)
- Assistant coaches: Mickie DeMoss; Holly Warlick
- Home arena: Thompson-Boling Arena

1997–98 SEC women's basketball standings
	Conf.				Overall
Team	W		L	PCT	W		L	PCT
No. 1 Tennessee^{†}	14	–	0	1.000	39	–	0	1.000
No. 13 Florida	10	–	4	.714	23	–	9	.719
No. 11 Alabama	10	–	4	.714	24	–	10	.706
No. 18 Vanderbilt	9	–	5	.643	20	–	9	.690
Georgia	8	–	6	.571	17	–	11	.607
LSU	7	–	7	.500	19	–	13	.594
Arkansas	7	–	7	.500	22	–	11	.667
Kentucky	5	–	9	.357	13	–	15	.464
Mississippi State	4	–	10	.286	14	–	15	.483
Auburn	4	–	10	.286	16	–	11	.593
South Carolina	3	–	11	.214	13	–	15	.464
Ole Miss	3	–	11	.214	12	–	19	.387
† 1998 SEC tournament winner Rankings from AP poll

The 1997–98 Tennessee Lady Volunteers basketball team, coached by Pat Summitt, is considered to be one of the greatest teams in the history of U.S. women's college basketball, going 39–0, and winning their third consecutive national championship, while playing one of the toughest schedules in the nation. The Lady Vols started off the season ranked number one in the nation, a ranking that would not change. ESPN called it one of the top ten moments in women's sports of the 20th century. After the season, Summitt authored a book about the season, entitled "Raise the Roof".

== Preseason ==
The Lady Vols had just come off of a somewhat bittersweet season. While they had won the national championship, they had lost ten games, including two to rival Louisiana Tech. That team was the first Lady Vols team since 1991 that did not win either the SEC regular season or tournament championship.

However, the team did return several players, including All-American Chamique Holdsclaw, and had a freshman class that was being called the greatest ever, which included Tamika Catchings, Semeka Randall, Teresa Geter, and Kristen Clement. Tamika Catchings won Miss Basketball titles in two states: Illinois, her sophomore year, and Texas, her senior year. Additionally, she led her high school to a state championship and a 40–0 season her senior year. She also performed a quintuple-double in one of her games. Semeka Randall was also accomplished, named Parade's Player of the Year her senior year, a two-time Miss Basketball, as well as a two-time state tournament MVP. Kristen "Ace" Clement came out of Pennsylvania, where she had broken Wilt Chamberlain's scoring record in Philadelphia of 2,205 with 2,256 points. The record had stood for 40 years. The fourth freshman, Teresa Geter, was not as well-known, but was considered to be the best player in South Carolina, and had been named Miss Basketball, just like the others. Chamique, Tamika, and Semeka would become known as "The Meeks" as the season progressed.

== Regular season ==
=== Mississippi ===
After an exhibition rout of US Armed Forces, the Lady Vols opened up the season unusually, with a conference game against Mississippi. Semeka Randall did not start the game. However, four minutes into the game, the Lady Vols were only up 4–2. At this point, Randall was put into the game, and Tennessee scored fifteen straight, on a run fueled by her. Randall scored 24, and star Chamique Holdsclaw added 23. This season opener has caused a lot of anticipation, as it was expected that this would be the game where all four of Tennessee's freshman played together. However, during a November practice, Clement had injured her foot, resulting in a stress fracture. After a discussion with the team doctor, Clement agreed to sit out the Mississippi game in order to be able to play the next game, against Louisiana Tech.

=== Louisiana Tech ===
The Louisiana Tech Lady Techsters were ranked second in the country and was expected to challenge Tennessee for the national title. Tech returned all five of its starters from a team that had beaten the Vols twice the previous year. Tech came out on a 9–2 run, but led at the half by only a point. The teams played evenly for the beginning of the second half, before Louisiana Tech raised the lead to five with just over twelve minutes remaining. Summitt put her four freshman into the line-up, which went on a 12–0 run, giving Tennessee a lead they would never relinquish. Holdsclaw finished with a double-double (24 points, 11 rebounds), and Catchings contributed 17 points. Teresa Geter was a big contributor, as well, with five blocked shots. Clement was able to play the game, but it set her rehab back, and she would not play again for over a month.

=== Tennessee-Martin, Stanford, Portland, Texas, and the Big Apple Classic ===
The next game was against Summitt's alma mater, Tennessee-Martin. Martin was naming their court after Summitt, and the game was just an excuse to attract a large number of people. Their meeting was not much of a game, as Tennessee won 73–32. Summitt's team followed this game with a 40-point rout of Vermont. The team next went on a road trip to the West Coast for their annual game against rival Stanford. Stanford lit up the court in the first half, sinking 57 percent of their shots, but it was not enough to keep the Lady Vols away. Down by one at the half, the Lady Vols played great defense in the second, allowing just five field goals and winning by 18. Holdsclaw had 25 points, and Catchings had 20. The Lady Vols next traveled to Portland, as part of Summitt's yearly effort to play at least one game near the hometown of each player. This game was meant more as a homecoming for Laurie Milligan, instead of an actual challenge, and they cruised to a 74–51 victory. December opened up with a game against rival Texas, who shot out to a 47–32 lead at halftime, and went on to win by 34, behind Catchings' 26 points. Next up was the Big Apple Classic, a home trip for Holdsclaw. The Ladies rolled over both opponents, beating George Mason and Manhattan by 30 and 50 respectively.

=== SEC/Big-10 Challenge ===
The Vols then returned home for the SEC/Big-10 challenge. Florida lost by 10 to Purdue, and the Vols' game was against Illinois. The game featured an interesting match-up as Catchings' sister, Tauja, was a sophomore at Illinois at the time. Tennessee had a horrific start as they fell behind 41–19. By halftime, the lead had been cut to 41–24, despite only shooting 23%. In the second half, Tennessee cut the lead slowly, through turnovers and defense, finally taking the lead with 9:25 remaining. The Vols ended the game with a ten-point win.

=== Northern Lights Invitational ===
The next trip was up to Anchorage, for the Northern Lights Invitational, a three-day, eight-team tournament. The first game was an easy win against Akron, in which Summitt played her bench frequently. The semi-final game, against Texas A&M, was not much more difficult. The Ladies won handily, 105–81, leading by as much as 25. Texas A&M's 81 points would end up being the most a team would score on Tennessee that season. The championship game was against Wisconsin, a team ranked in the top 10, but this ranking did not mean much, as the team ended 1997 with an 87–66 victory. The Meeks were named to the All-Tournament team.

=== Arkansas and UConn ===
A rare New Year's Day game was played against SEC foe Arkansas, who was ranked just inside the top 25. Tennessee forced 26 turnovers, including 14 steals, en route to an 88–58 victory. This game was followed up with a home match with main rival UConn, who was ranked third in the nation. UConn led the series 4–3, but the Lady Vols had won the last matchup, and the undefeated Huskies wanted revenge. Thompson-Boling Arena seated nearly 25,000 fans, an NCAA women's record, and, as an experiment, the game was played in four quarters instead of two halves. The Lady Vols started off on a 10–0 run, but the lead was cut to 23–17 by the end of the first quarter. The second quarter saw Tennessee expand the lead, ending the quarter with a fourteen-point lead. However, UConn did not want to go away, and went on a tear in the third quarter, as a 20–7 run cut the Lady Vols lead to one point, before the team responded, ending the quarter with seven unanswered points. The final quarter was all Tennessee, and the game ended in an 84–69 win.

=== South Carolina and Florida ===
The team started their SEC schedule back up with a trip to South Carolina. The Gamecocks were not much of an opponent, as the ladies more than doubled their points at the half (53–26), and finished the game 94–52. This game was followed up with another highly ranked opponent, the twelfth-ranked Gators. Once again, the Vols ran a talented team into the ground, as they only allowed 18 first half points, ultimately winning by a score of 99–60.

=== Georgia, Kentucky, and DePaul ===
Tennessee had a three-game road trip up next, starting with the Bulldogs in Athens. Tennessee started the game strong, grabbing the lead, and finished the half on a 13–0 run. However, Georgia came back, cutting the lead down to nine with seven minutes remaining in the game. It was at this point that Semeka Randall scored thirteen points, sealing a 96–71 victory. This is the largest margin of victory in the Lady Bulldogs-Lady Vols series. Tennessee had 19 steals in the game, while shooting over 50%, and Holdsclaw and Catchings both scored over 20. The next game, against Kentucky, also had Tennessee making a late first half run, giving them a 19-point lead at the break. This lead was never given up, as the Lady Vols won by twenty-eight. The final game of the road trip was against DePaul, a good team who was, however, missing their two best players. Without these players, it was not much of a game, as Summitt's team started the game with twenty-one straight points and ended the game with a 125–46 victory, giving the team a 20–0 record. The team's 125 points were the second most in the history of the program.

=== Vanderbilt and Georgia ===
The Lady Vols returned home and resumed their SEC schedule against in-state foe Vanderbilt, who was ranked in the top 10. Throughout the first half, the game was about even, until the Lady Vols got a slight lead with under seven minutes left, which they took to the locker room, 37–31. The second half, however, started out much differently, beginning with a 20–0 Lady Vols run. Tennessee led by as many as 35 points in the game, and ended the game with an 86–54 win. Catchings was named the SEC Player of the Week for her role in the DePaul and Vanderbilt games, scoring 35 and 22 points respectively. The final game of the month was the rematch with Georgia. It ended up being a blowout. Tennessee shot better than 60%, and Holdsclaw scored more points in the first half than the entire Georgia team. Tennessee broke the 20-steal mark, as well as the 100-point mark, winning 102–43.

=== Alabama, Old Dominion, and Mississippi State ===
February began with another SEC match-up, this time against unranked Alabama. Starter Kyra Elzy tore her ACL during the game ending her season, during this game, while going up for a rebound. Meanwhile, Alabama was keeping close to the Lady Vols, by slowing the game down. At half time, Tennessee only had a 13-point lead. The team never did shake off the Crimson Tide, but did manage to pull out the win, 73–66. A trip to Ole Miss was next, and the team started off much better, score the first ten points of the game and having a 54–17 lead at halftime. Summitt let the bench play the rest of the game, ultimately winning 91–45. This game was followed up by a non-conference match against longtime rival Old Dominion, whom Tennessee had beaten in the previous year's national championship. The game was even for fifteen minutes, but in the last five minutes of the half, Tennessee was able to build a twelve-point lead. Holdsclaw took over the second half for the Lady Vols, scoring 24 points for an 85–61 victory, ODU's biggest loss in four years. This match was followed up with another conference game, this time against the Mississippi State Bulldogs. UT started out sloppily, and ended the half with only a nine-point lead. However, once again the team came out strong to open the second half, raising their lead and eventually had double State's points, with ten minutes remaining. The Bulldogs cut the lead to eleven, but then Summitt put Holdsclaw back in, scoring eight in a row, giving Tennessee another victory, 74–52.

=== Memphis, Auburn, Vanderbilt, and LSU ===
After a two-day rest, the Lady Vols resumed their season with three games in five days, starting with their final non-conference opponent, Memphis, on the road. UT started strong, taking a 16–6 lead to open up the game, only to give it back up. Memphis delighted its home crowd by taking a 38–31 lead with two minutes to go in the half, but Tennessee rallied and took a two-point lead to the locker room. Once again, Tennessee pulled away in the second half, 91–65, behind three players who scored over twenty: Holdsclaw (31), Randall (21), and Catchings (20). The next game was against Auburn, a program that is traditionally competitive within the conference. Once again, Summitt's team started the game strong, leading 32–16 before Auburn woke up, cutting the lead to five by the half. However, the Tigers would not get any closer than this, as Holdsclaw's 39 points helped Tennessee to yet another win, 79–63. The final game of this stretch was the rematch with Vanderbilt, played on President's Day in front of a sellout crowd at the Commodores' quirky Memorial Gymnasium and a national television audience on ESPN. The Commodores started off strong, taking a 16–7 lead in front of their home crowd. However Tennessee responded with seventeen straight points to take the lead, and led by nine at the halftime. As in previous games, the Lady Vols made a big run to open up the second half to put the game out of reach. UT won 91–60, with UT shooting over fifty percent yet again. The final game of the regular season came against LSU, a respectable SEC team which beat the Lady Vols the previous season in Baton Rouge, but still a few seasons away from becoming a national power. Tennessee played well on Senior Night, starting with a 32–8 lead that would never be given up. Tennessee completed the season with a 90–58 win, giving them a perfect 30–0 regular season.

== SEC tournament ==
After their first round bye, Tennessee faced Mississippi State again. Instead of Tennessee starting quickly, however, the Bulldogs did, taking a 9–2 lead. At this point though, the Vols went on one of their runs, this time a 15–2 one. State did not recover from this, and Tennessee advanced to the semi-finals, 88–60. Catchings had a double-double by halftime. In the semi-finals, UT met Vanderbilt for the third time, with an even better performance than the previous two. Catchings again had a double-double by halftime and the team shot 6 of 7 from beyond the three-point line, as they advanced to the championship 106–45. The SEC Championship was against Alabama, who had played within seven points of the Lady Vols in their previous match-up. Alabama used the same, slow style they had previously employed, and at the break were only down by three. Tennessee was able to slowly up the lead to ten during the first ten minutes of the second period, eventually reaching a fourteen-point lead, before Alabama started a comeback, cutting the lead to five with just over forty seconds remaining. Alabama was able to score the five points, but Tennessee made their foul shots, and won the title, 67–63. After the game, Holdsclaw was named the tournament's most outstanding player. UT was now 33–0, with the NCAA tournament coming up next.

== NCAA tournament ==
=== Opening Games ===
The Lady Vols were awarded the No. 1 seed in the Mideast Regional where their opponent was also undefeated. The 28–0 Lady Flames of Liberty were the champions of the Big South conference, giving them a berth in the tournament as a No. 16 seed. The usual #1-#16 blowout occurred, with Tennessee winning 102–58, although in another region this blowout did not occur: No. 16 seed Harvard upset injury-depleted No. 1 seed Stanford 71–67 in the West regional. This was the first time that a 16-seed had beaten a 1-seed in the NCAA tournament — men's or women's. Holdsclaw led Tennessee with 22 points, although Liberty's Sharon Wilkerson led all scorers with 26. Four other Lady Vols reached double figures, and both Holdsclaw and Catchings had double-doubles.

UT's second round opponent was 8-seeded Western Kentucky, who had lost only by to one to Louisiana Tech in the Sun Belt Tournament, and had defeated Stephen F. Austin in the first round, 88–76. Tennessee started slowly and Randall picked up two early fouls, resulting in Ace Clement taking her place in the lineup where she scored five quick points and helped the team to a twelve-point halftime lead. Western Kentucky pulled to within six early on in the second half, only to follow their run up by going 0 for 6 on their next shots. However, the Lady Toppers pulled back within six a second time. Once again, their run was short lived, as it was followed up with a spree of turnovers. The Lady Vols took advantage of this drought, and went on to win 82–62. Holdsclaw led all scorers with 34 and Catchings contributed 20, while Le Johnson was Western Kentucky's highest scorer, with 17.

The Regional Finals were not all that far away from Knoxville – the Lady Vols only had to travel a couple of hours, to Nashville, where they faced 5th-seeded Rutgers, who came in with a record of 22–9. Rutgers had survived two close games to reach this point, defeating 12th-seeded Oregon, 79–76, in the first round, and then upsetting 4th-seeded Iowa State, 62–61 in the second. Their third-round game was not quite so close. Although Rutgers only trailed by two towards the end of the first period, UT was able to outscore Rutgers by six to close it out, and opened the second half up by building the lead to sixteen. The Scarlet Knights never recovered, losing 92–60. Holdsclaw and Catchings were again the leading scorers, with 25 and 23. The Lady Vols shot 52.2% from the field and forced Rutgers to 27 turnovers. This game gave Tennessee their 36th win, breaking Connecticut's record of 35, as the Lady Vols advanced to the Regional Finals.

The Regional Championship matched Tennessee with the 2nd-seeded Tar Heels, who were coming off of a 6-point victory over 3rd-seeded Illinois. Summitt's team started off with a 17–11 lead, only to falter and allow Carolina to tie it up at 21. Tennessee responded with a 12–6 run to end the first, but Carolina answered by opening the second half with the first seven points, giving them a one-point lead, 34–33, and the first time an opponent had held a lead over Tennessee in over three months. Carolina slowly extended the lead as the game continued, until they were eventually leading 61–49, at which point Summitt sent several players, including Holdsclaw (who was on the bench due to a poor shooting performance) back onto the floor. A minute later, Tennessee had cut the deficit to five, and by the five-minute mark the game was tied again, at 62. The teams traded baskets, tying the game at 64 and 66, before Tennessee reached a 70–67 lead, with less than ninety seconds remaining. Carolina was soon forced to start fouling the Lady Vols, who made their free throws and advanced to the Final Four, 76–70. Holdsclaw once again led all scorers, this time with 29, and Semeka Randall had 20. North Carolina was led by Wright and Reid, who had 21 and 20.

=== Final Four ===
Tennessee's first Final Four game was against SEC foe, Arkansas, the 9th-seed out of the West Region. The Razorbacks had upset three different teams to reach the Final Four, Hawaiʻi, Kansas, and 2nd-seeded Duke. Despite a poor first half shooting performance, the Vols led 39–28 halfway through the game. The second half saw the Lady Vols make over half their shots, propelling the team to the national championship with an 86–58, the largest margin of victory in the Women's National Semifinals history.

Louisiana Tech knocked off NC State in their semifinal match, 84–65, making the national championship a match-up between the two teams that started the season ranked first and second. The game was not close. Seven and a half minutes through the first half, the Lady Vols were up by fifteen, and by halftime the score was 55–32. The 55 points was a record for most points in a half in a national championship game. Tech was not able to make a run until late in the second half, when they were able to cut the lead down to eighteen, only to see Kellie Jolly hit back-to-back three-pointers. The final score was 93 to 75. Three different Lady Vols scored twenty or more points: Holdsclaw (25), Catchings (27), and Jolly (20). Holdsclaw, who was named the Final Four MVP, her second consecutive, also won her seventh straight title (3 NCAA, 4 State). After the game, Louisiana Tech head coach Leon Balmore proclaimed this Lady Vols squad to be the "best ever", something Old Dominion Hall of Famer Nancy Lieberman has stated back in February. However, not everyone was positive, as ESPN analyst Mimi Griffin stated that Tennessee's dominance was becoming a detriment to the women's game.

The Lady Vols did not win another national championship until 2007, defeating Rutgers in the championship game in Cleveland. Tennessee lost three times to Connecticut in championship games (2000, 2003, 2004), but also suffered a humiliating loss to Xavier in the 2001 Sweet 16, marking only the second time since the NCAA first sanctioned women's basketball championships in 1982 the Lady Vols did not reach at least the Elite Eight. Connecticut would later match the Lady Vols' 39–0 mark in 2002, 2009, and 2010 before Baylor eclipsed the record in 2012 and tied by UConn themselves in 2014, as the only teams to win 40 straight games in a season.

== Schedule and results ==
Date time, TV	Rank^{#}	Opponent^{#}	Result	Record	Site city, state
Exhibition
Nov 9, 1997*	No. 1	U.S. Armed Forces	W 111–54	–	Thompson-Boling Arena; Knoxville, Tennessee
Regular season
Nov 18, 1997	No. 1	Ole Miss	W 92–54	1–0 (1–0)	Thompson-Boling Arena (7,798); Knoxville, Tennessee
Nov 21, 1997*	No. 1	No. 2 Louisiana Tech	W 75–61	2–0	Thompson-Boling Arena (16,490); Knoxville, Tennessee
Nov 23, 1997*	No. 1	Tennessee–Martin	W 73–32	3–0	Thompson-Boling Arena (6,834); Knoxville, Tennessee
Nov 25, 1997*	No. 1	Vermont	W 92–52	4–0	Thompson-Boling Arena (7,840); Knoxville, Tennessee
Nov 29, 1997*	No. 1	at No. 11 Stanford	W 88–70	5–0	San Jose Arena (8,025); San Jose, California
Nov 30, 1997*	No. 1	at Portland	W 74–51	6–0	Chiles Center (3,503); Portland, Oregon
Dec 3, 1997*	No. 1	Texas	W 98–64	7–0	Thompson-Boling Arena (8,556); Knoxville, Tennessee
Dec 6, 1997*	No. 1	vs. George Mason; Big Apple Classic	W 93–61	8–0	Draddy Gymnasium (1,108); Riverdale, New York
Dec 7, 1997*	No. 1	at Manhattan; Big Apple Classic	W 78–28	9–0	Draddy Gymnasium (1,214); Riverdale, New York
Dec 12, 1997*	No. 1	Illinois	W 78–68	10–0	Thompson-Boling Arena (9,208); Knoxville, Tennessee
Dec 18, 1997*	No. 1	vs. Akron; Northern Lights Invitational	W 98–63	11–0	Sullivan Arena (985); Anchorage, Alaska
Dec 19, 1997*	No. 1	vs. Texas A&M; Northern Lights Invitational	W 105–81	12–0	Sullivan Arena (828); Anchorage, Alaska
Dec 20, 1997*	No. 1	vs. No. 10 Wisconsin; Northern Lights Invitational	W 87–66	13–0	Sullivan Arena (1,350); Anchorage, Alaska
Jan 1, 1998	No. 1	Arkansas	W 88–58	14–0 (2–0)	Thompson-Boling Arena (15,390); Knoxville, Tennessee
Jan 3, 1998*	No. 1	No. 3 Connecticut	W 84–69	15–0	Thompson-Boling Arena (24,597); Knoxville, Tennessee
Feb 7, 1998*	No. 1	No. 3 Old Dominion	W 85–61	25–0	Thompson-Boling Arena (24,373); Knoxville, Tennessee
Feb 22, 1998	No. 1	No. 14 Vanderbilt	W 91–60	29–0 (13–0)	Memorial Gymnasium (14,848); Nashville, Tennessee
Feb 22, 1998	No. 1	No. 14 LSU	W 90–58	30–0 (14–0)	Thompson-Boling Arena (22,694); Knoxville, Tennessee
SEC tournament
Feb 27, 1998*	No. 1	Mississippi State; Quarterfinal	W 88–60	31–0	Columbus Civic Center (4,263); Columbus, Georgia
Feb 28, 1998*	No. 1	No. 14 Vanderbilt; Semifinal	W 106–45	32–0	Columbus Civic Center (7,438); Columbus, Georgia
Mar 1, 1998*	No. 1	No. 20 Alabama; Championship game	W 67–63	33–0	Columbus Civic Center (7,603); Columbus, Georgia
NCAA tournament
Mar 19, 1998*	(1 ME) No. 1	(16 ME) Liberty; First round	W 102–58	34–0	Thompson-Boling Arena (12,577); Knoxville, Tennessee
Mar 21, 1998*	(1 ME) No. 1	(8 ME) Western Kentucky; Second round	W 82–62	35–0	Thompson-Boling Arena (10,838); Knoxville, Tennessee
Mar 21, 1998*	(1 ME) No. 1	vs. (5 ME) Rutgers; Regional Semifinal – Sweet Sixteen	W 92–60	36–0	Memorial Gymnasium (14,711); Nashville, Tennessee
Mar 23, 1998*	(1 ME) No. 1	vs. (2 ME) No. 7 North Carolina; Regional Final – Elite Eight	W 76–70	37–0	Memorial Gymnasium (14,848); Nashville, Tennessee
Mar 27, 1998*	(1 ME) No. 1	vs. (9 W) Arkansas; National Semifinal – Final Four	W 86–58	38–0	Kemper Arena (17,976); Kansas City, Missouri
Mar 29, 1998*	(1 ME) No. 1	vs. (3 MW) No. 4 Louisiana Tech; National Championship	W 93–75	39–0	Kemper Arena (17,976); Kansas City, Missouri
*Non-conference game. ^{#}Rankings from AP Poll. (#) Tournament seedings in parentheses. ME=Mideast.

== Scores ==
Date	Opponent	Location	Score	Record
Nov 9	US Armed Forces	Knoxville, TN	111–54	Exhibition
Nov 18	Mississippi	Knoxville, TN	92–54	1–0 (1–0)
Nov 21	No. 2 Louisiana Tech	Knoxville, TN	75–61	2–0 (1–0)
Nov 23	Tennessee-Martin	Martin, TN	73–32	3–0 (1–0)
Nov 25	Vermont	Knoxville, TN	92–52	4–0 (1–0)
Nov 29	No. 11 Stanford	San Jose, CA	88–70	5–0 (1–0)
Nov 30	Portland	Portland, OR	74–51	6–0 (1–0)
Dec 3	Texas	Knoxville, TN	98–64	7–0 (1–0)
Dec 6	George Mason	Big Apple Classic – Riverdale, NY	93–61	8–0 (1–0)
Dec 7	Manhattan	Big Apple Classic – Riverdale, NY	78–28	9–0 (1–0)
Dec 12	Illinois	SEC/Big-10 Challenge – Knoxville, TN	78–68	10–0 (1–0)
Dec 18	Akron	Northern Lights Invitational – Anchorage, AK	98–63	11–0 (1–0)
Dec 19	Texas A&M	Northern Lights Invitational – Anchorage, AK	105–81	12–0 (1–0)
Dec 20	No. 10 Wisconsin	Northern Lights Invitational – Anchorage, AK	87–66	13–0 (1–0)
Jan 1	Arkansas	Knoxville, TN	88–58	14–0 (2–0)
Jan 3	No. 3 UConn	Knoxville, TN	84–69	15–0 (2–0)
Jan 6	South Carolina	Columbia, SC	94–52	16–0 (3–0)
Jan 10	No. 12 Florida	Knoxville, TN	99–60	17–0 (4–0)
Jan 14	No. 19 Georgia	Athens, GA	96–71	18–0 (5–0)
Jan 18	Kentucky	Lexington, KY	93–65	19–0 (6–0)
Jan 20	DePaul	Chicago, IL	125–46	20–0 (6–0)
Jan 25	No. 9 Vanderbilt	Knoxville, TN	86–54	21–0 (7–0)
Jan 28	No. 17 Georgia	Knoxville, TN	102–43	22–0 (8–0)
Feb 1	Alabama	Knoxville, TN	73–66	23–0 (9–0)
Feb 4	Mississippi	Oxford, MS	91–45	24–0 (10–0)
Feb 7	No. 3 Old Dominion	Knoxville, TN	85–61	25–0 (10–0)
Feb 9	Mississippi State	Starkville, MS	74–52	26–0 (11–0)
Feb 12	Memphis	Memphis, TN	91–65	27–0 (11–0)
Feb 14	Auburn	Auburn, AL	79–63	28–0 (12–0)
Feb 16	No. 14 Vanderbilt	Nashville, TN	91–60	29–0 (13–0)
Feb 22	LSU	Knoxville, TN	90–58	30–0 (14–0)
Feb 27	Mississippi State	SEC Tournament – Columbus, GA	88–60	31–0
Feb 28	No. 14 Vanderbilt	SEC Tournament – Columbus, GA	106–45	32–0
Mar 1	No. 20 Alabama	SEC Championship – Columbus, GA	67–63	33–0
Mar 14	Liberty	NCAA Tournament – 1st round Knoxville, TN	102–58	34–0
Mar 16	Western Kentucky	NCAA Tournament – 2nd round Knoxville, TN	82–62	35–0
Mar 21	Rutgers	NCAA Tournament – Mideast Regionals Semifinals; Nashville, TN	92–60	36–0
Mar 23	No. 7 North Carolina	NCAA Tournament – Mideast Regionals Finals; Nashville, TN	76–70	37–0
Mar 27	Arkansas	NCAA Tournament – National Semifinals; Kansas City, MO	86–58	38–0
Mar 29	No. 4 Louisiana Tech	NCAA National Championship; Kansas City, MO	93–75	39–0

== Awards and honors ==
- 2 Kodak All-Americans (Chamique Holdsclaw, Tamika Catchings)
- 1 AP First Team All-American (Chamique Holdsclaw)
- 1 AP Second Team All-American (Tamika Catchings)
- 1 U.S. Basketball Writers' Association All-American (Chamique Holdsclaw)
- AP Player of the Year (Chamique Holdsclaw)
- U.S. Basketball Writers' Association Player of the Year (Chamique Holdsclaw)
- Naismith Trophy Winner (Chamique Holdsclaw)
- Honda-Broderick Cup Winner (Chamique Holdsclaw)
- State Farm/WCBA Division I Player of the Year (Chamique Holdsclaw)
- AP Coach of the Year
- Naismith Coach of the Year
- U.S. Basketball Writers' Association Coach of the Year
- Russell Athletic/WCBA Division I Coach of the Year
- NCAA Final Four Most Outstanding Player (Chamique Holdsclaw)
- 3 All-Final Four Team Members (Chamique Holdsclaw, Kellie Jolly, Tamika Catchings)
- 3 All-SEC Tournament Team Members (Chamique Holdsclaw, Tamika Catchings, Semeka Randall)
- SEC Tournament MVP (Chamique Holdsclaw)
- 2 All-NCAA Mideast Regional Team Members (Chamique Holdsclaw, Semeka Randall)
- NCAA Mideast Regional Most Outstanding Player (Chamique Holdsclaw)
- SEC Freshman of the Year (Tamika Catchings)
- SEC Player of the Year (Chamique Holdsclaw)
- SEC Coach of the Year
- Swept SEC Coach, Player, and Freshman of the Year honors—a feat not repeated in the conference until Kentucky in 2010.
- 2 All-SEC First Team Members (Chamique Holdsclaw, Tamika Catchings)
- 1 All-SEC Second Team Member (Semeka Randall)
- 2 All-SEC Freshman Team Members (Tamika Catchings, Semeka Randall)
- 3 SEC Players of the Week (Chamique Holdsclaw (12/1, 1/5), Tamika Catchings (1/26))
- 1998 ESPY – Outstanding Female Athlete of the Year (Chamique Holdsclaw)
- 1998 ESPY – Outstanding Women's Hoops Performer of the Year (Chamique Holdsclaw)
- 2000 ESPY – College team of the decade – TIE (Florida State football)

== Records ==
=== NCAA records ===
- Most games played in a season (individual) – 39 (tied: Chamique Holdsclaw, Teresa Geter, Tamika Catchings, Kellie Jolly, LaShonda Stephens (All 1997–98 Tennessee))
- Most points in a season (team) – 3,464
- Most free throw attempts in a season (team) – 1,110
- Most victories in a season – 39 (tied: UConn, 2001–02)
- Most games played in a season (team) – 39 (tied: UConn, 2001–02)
- Most field goals in an NCAA tournament (player) – 64 (Chamique Holdsclaw)
- Most field goals attempted in an NCAA tournament (player) – 131 (Chamique Holdsclaw)

=== SEC records ===
- Most points in a season (team) – 3,464
- Most free throw attempts in a season (team) – 1,110
- Most free throws made in a season (team) – 782
- Most blocks in a season (team) – 238

=== School records ===
- Most free throws made in a season (player) – 166 (Chamique Holdsclaw)
- Most blocks in a season (player) – 93 (Teresa Geter)
- Most points in a season (team) – 3,464
- Most free throw attempts in a season (team) – 1,110
- Most free throws made in a season (team) – 782
- Most blocks in a season (team) – 238
- Most wins in a season – 39

== Roster ==
1997–98 Tennessee Lady Vols Basketball Roster
Number	Name	Position	Height	Year	Hometown	High School
3	Niya Butts	Forward	6–0	Junior	Americus, Georgia	Americus High School
5	Kyra Elzy	Forward	6–1	Sophomore	La Grange, Kentucky	Oldham County High School
11	Laurie Milligan	Guard	5–8	Senior	Tigard, Oregon	Tigard High School
13	Misty Greene	Guard/Forward	5–9	Junior	Decatur, Tennessee	Meigs County High School
14	Kellie Jolly	Guard	5–10	Junior	Sparta, Tennessee	White County High School
21	Semeka Randall	Guard	5–10	Freshman	Cleveland, Ohio	Trinity High School
23	Chamique Holdsclaw	Forward/Center	6–2	Junior	Astoria, New York	Christ the King High School
24	Tamika Catchings	Guard/Forward	6–1	Freshman	Duncanville, Texas	Duncanville High School
31	Brynae Laxton	Forward	6–0	Junior	Oneida, Tennessee	Oneida High School
33	Kristen "Ace" Clement	Guard	5–11	Freshman	Broomall, Pennsylvania	Cardinal O'Hara High School
34	LaShonda Stephens	Forward	6–3	Sophomore	Canton, Georgia	Sequoyah High School
40	Teresa "Tree" Geter	Center	6–3	Freshman	Columbia, South Carolina	Columbia High School

== Statistics ==
Player!	G	GS	MIN	AVG	FG	FGA	PCT	3P	3PA	PCT	FT	FTA	PCT	OFF	DEF	TOT	AVG	PF	DQ	AST	TO	BK	ST	PTS	AVG
Holdsclaw	39	39	1,168	29.9	370	678	.546	9	41	.220	166	217	.765	133	195	328	8.4	82	0	117	109	36	110	915	23.5
Catchings	39	37	1,123	28.87	253	471	.537	40	110	.364	165	217	.760	124	189	313	8.0	89	2	92	93	61	100	711	18.2
Randall	38	21	987	26.0	224	460	.487	1	11	.091	155	213	.728	108	92	200	5.3	71	3	50	84	5	102	604	15.9
Jolly	39	38	1,045	26.8	100	216	.463	36	86	.419	59	70	.843	21	67	88	2.3	56	0	148	64	6	72	295	7.6
Elzy	24	18	450	18.8	60	147	.408	0	2	.000	48	70	.686	56	41	97	4.0	48	1	37	36	13	35	168	7.0
Geter	39	9	815	20.9	98	179	.547	0	0	.000	48	77	.623	74	112	186	4.8	104	4	31	56	93	46	244	6.3
Clement	33	0	684	20.7	59	140	.421	11	36	.306	56	87	.644	19	55	74	2.2	59	0	107	79	5	49	185	5.6
Stephens	39	31	724	18.6	60	195	.308	0	1	.000	37	63	.587	60	71	131	3.4	90	3	6	41	14	22	157	4.0
Milligan	9	1	60	6.7	6	14	.429	2	7	.286	4	7	.571	1	3	4	0.4	5	0	6	4	0	4	18	2.0
Greene	34	0	275	8.1	24	83	.289	7	51	.137	12	14	.857	11	29	40	1.2	23	0	12	16	2	10	67	2.0
Butts	33	0	176	5.3	22	53	.415	0	0	.000	16	35	.457	15	21	36	1.1	25	0	11	21	1	11	60	1.8
Laxton	33	1	293	8.9	12	43	.279	0	0	.000	16	40	.400	27	36	63	1.9	24	0	7	28	2	6	40	1.2
TENN	39	–	7,800	–	1,288	2,679	.481	106	345	.307	782	1,110	.705	649	911	1,728	44.3	676	–	624	646	238	567	3,464	88.8
OPP	39	–	7,800	–	852	2,309	.369	132	477	.277	454	656	.692	579	824	1,403	36.0	856	–	428	1,000	113	273	2,290	58.7

== Team players drafted into the WNBA ==
Round	Pick	Player	NBA club
1	1	Chamique Holdsclaw	Washington Mystics
