= 1997–98 NC State Wolfpack women's basketball team =

Intercollegiate basketball season

1997–98 NC State Wolfpack women's basketball

NCAA tournament, Final Four
- Conference: Atlantic Coast Conference

Ranking
- Coaches: No. 4
- AP: No. 10
- Record: 25–7 (12–4 ACC)
- Head coach: Kay Yow (11th season)
- Home arena: Reynolds Coliseum

The 1997–98 NC State Wolfpack women's basketball team represented North Carolina State University during the 1997–98 NCAA Division I women's basketball season. The Wolfpack were led by eleventh-year head coach Kay Yow and played their home games at Reynolds Coliseum as members of the Atlantic Coast Conference.

The Wolfpack got off to a hot start to the season when they upset second ranked Connecticut in the second game of the season. The Wolfpack were unranked at the time, and vaulted to fourteenth in the nation with the win. They carried their momentum through the Paradise Jam, defeating number 3 Colorado to win the championship. After the tournament win, the team was ranked fifth. Following and ACC–SEC Challenge win over Vanderbilt and a win over Illinois State, the Wolfpack reached their season highest ranking of third. The Wolfpack finished off the non-conference season with three more wins, and finished that portion of the season undefeated. The Wolfpack started the ACC season with wins over Virginia and an overtime victory over number 22 Florida State. Their first loss of the season was not until January 7, 2024, when they lost away to number 13 Virginia Tech. They were upset two games later against Miami (FL), but then won five straight games, including a rivalry game against number 24 North Carolina and over number 15 Louisville. The Wolfpack were again ranked third before losing again to Virginia Tech, this time when the Hokies were ranked number 16. They defeated number 16 Notre Dame and survived an upset scare in overtime against Georgia Tech before losing their rivalry rematch with North Carolina and losing at Duke. They finished the season with an overtime win over number 19 Syracuse and a final game victory over Wake Forest.

The Wolfpack finished the season 31–7 overall and 13–5 in ACC play to finish in a three-way tie for second place. As the second seed in the ACC tournament, they earned a bye into the quarterfinals, where they defeated seventh seed Duke. They defeated sixth seed Florida State to reach the finals. They could not prevail in a low-scoring game, and lost 51–55. They received an at-large invitation to the NCAA Tournament, marking the sixth straight time the Wolfpack qualified for the tournament. As the third seed in the Portland 4 region, they defeated fourteenth seed Chattanooga in the first round, sixth seed Tennessee in the second round, second seed Stanford in the Sweet 16, and regional first seed Texas in the Elite Eight to qualify for the second Final Four in program history. In the Final Four, they could not overcome overall first seed South Carolina and lost 59–78 to end their season.

== Roster ==
1997–98 NC State Wolfpack women's basketball team
Players	Coaches
Pos. / # / Name / Height / Year / Previous school / Hometown; F/C / / Chasity Melvin / 6 ft 3 in (1.91 m) / Sr / Lakewood / Salemburg, NC	Head coach: Kay Yow; Assistant coach(es) Legend: (C) Team captain; (S) Suspended; (I) Ineligible; (W) Walk-on; Injured; Current redshirt; Roster

== Schedule and results ==
Date time, TV	Rank^{#}	Opponent^{#}	Result	Record	Site (attendance) city, state
Regular season
ACC tournament
NCAA tournament
Mar 21, 1998*	(4 E) No. 10	vs. (1 E) No. 2 Old Dominion; Regional Semifinal – Sweet Sixteen	W 55–54	24–6	UD Arena; Dayton, Ohio
Mar 23, 1998*	(4 E) No. 10	vs. (2 E) No. 3 Connecticut; Regional Final – Elite Eight	W 72–65	25–6	UD Arena; Dayton, Ohio
Mar 27, 1998*	(4 E) No. 10	vs. (3 MW) No. 4 Louisiana Tech; National Semifinal – Final Four	L 65–84	25–7	Kemper Arena (17,976); Kansas City, Missouri
*Non-conference game. ^{#}Rankings from AP Poll. (#) Tournament seedings in parentheses. All times are in Eastern.

== Rankings ==
Ranking movements Legend: ██ Increase in ranking ██ Decrease in ranking — = Not ranked т = Tied with team above or below
	Week																		
Poll	Pre	1	2	3	4	5	6	7	8	9	10	11	12	13	14	15	16	17	Final
AP	—	—	—	25	22	20	19	18	17	10	8	12	9	11	10	9	10	10	Not released
Coaches	—	—	—	23	20	14	14	14	13	9	7	9т	6	8	8	7	10	10	4

^Coaches did not release a Week 2 poll.
