= Linda Serrato =

American politician

Member of the New Mexico House of Representatives from the 45th district
- Incumbent
- Assumed office October 17, 2020
- Preceded by: Jim Trujillo

Personal details
- Born: Linda Michelle Serrato Chino, California, U.S.
- Party: Democratic
- Spouse: Matt Ybarra (m. 2012)
- Children: 1
- Education: Stanford University (BA)

Linda Michelle Serrato is an American politician and political advisor serving as a member of the New Mexico House of Representatives from the 45th district. Serrato is a candidate for the seat in the 2020 election, and was appointed to the seat on October 17, 2020 after the resignation of Jim Trujillo.

== Early life and education ==
Serrato was born and raised in Chino, California. She earned a Bachelor of Arts degree in public policy from Stanford University in 2007. As an undergraduate, Serrato directed a production of Stan Lai's Sand on a Distant Star.

== Political career ==
Serrato moved to New Mexico to work as a staffer on the Barack Obama 2008 presidential campaign, where she was assigned to the Eastern New Mexico region. After the Obama campaign, Serrato worked as the press secretary and legislative assistant in the office of Congressman Ben Ray Luján. Serrato then returned to Los Angeles, working as the deputy communications director for Parent Revolution, a non-profit school choice organization. She served as the California Press Secretary for the Barack Obama 2012 presidential campaign. In 2014 and 2015, she served as the communications director for Nury Martinez. From 2015 to 2017, she worked as the communications director for the Fairness Project, a 501(c)(4) charitable organization that supports progressive economic and social justice policies through ballot measures. In 2017, Serrato joined Ben Ray Luján's re-election campaign for Congress as political director and communications director.

After the 2017 inauguration of Donald Trump, Serrato participated in protests in Santa Fe County, New Mexico.

Serrato works as a political and communications consultant in Santa Fe, New Mexico. In 2020, she announced her candidacy for district 45 in the New Mexico House of Representatives. After the resignation of incumbent Democrat Jim Trujillo, Serrato was selected by the Santa Fe County Commission to serve for the remainder of his term. Serrato remains the Democratic nominee in the November general election.

She was reelected to represent New Mexico's 45th District on November 8, 2022.

=== LGBTQIA+ rights ===
Serrato supports transgender rights and supports providing gender affirming care to youth that identify as transgender.

== Personal life ==
Serrato and her husband, Matt Ybarra, have one daughter and live in Santa Fe, New Mexico.
