= Brandi McCain =

American basketball player

Personal information
- Born: September 21, 1979 (age 47) Silsbee, Texas, U.S.
- Listed height: 5 ft 3 in (1.60 m)
- Listed weight: 135 lb (61 kg)

Career information
- High school: Silsbee (Silsbee, Texas)
- College: Florida (1998–2002)
- WNBA draft: 2002: 2nd round, 24th overall pick
- Drafted by: Cleveland Rockers
- Playing career: 2002–2002
- Position: Guard
- Number: 11

Career history
- 2002: Cleveland Rockers

Career highlights
- First-team All-American (2001); 2× First-team All-SEC (1999, 2001)
- Stats at Basketball Reference
Medals
Women's basketball
Representing United States
World University Games
Silver medal – second place	1999 Palma de Mallorca	Team competition

Brandi McCain (born September 21, 1979) is an American former college and professional basketball player who was a guard in the Women's National Basketball Association (WNBA) for a single season in 2002. McCain played college basketball for the University of Florida, and the played professionally for the Cleveland Rockers of the WNBA.

== Early life ==
McCain attended Silsbee High School in Silsbee, Texas, and she played high school basketball for the Silsbee Tigers. She was recognized as a high school All-American by the Women's Basketball Coaches Association (WBCA), and participated in the WBCA High School All-America Game, during which she scored eight points.

== College career ==
McCain accepted an athletic scholarship to attend the University of Florida in Gainesville, Florida, and played for coach Carol Ross's Florida Gators women's basketball team from 1998 to 2002. As a Lady Gator, she was a first-team All-Southeastern Conference (SEC) selection in 1999 and 2001, a second-team selection in 2000, and a first-team All-American in 2001. McCain was also a team captain in 2000 and 2002. She graduated from the University of Florida with a bachelor's degree in 2002.

== International career ==
McCain played on the team presenting the US at the 1999 World University Games held in Palma de Mallorca, Spain. The team had a 4–2 record and earned the silver medal. McCain averaged 6.0 points per game.

== Professional career ==
The Cleveland Rockers picked McCain in the second round (twenty-fourth pick overall) in the 2002 WNBA draft, and she played a single season for the Rockers in 2002. She played mostly in a reserve role, appearing in thirty-one games and starting two of them.

== Career statistics ==
Legend
GP	Games played	GS	Games started	MPG	Minutes per game	RPG	Rebounds per game
APG	Assists per game	SPG	Steals per game	BPG	Blocks per game	PPG	Points per game
TO	Turnovers per game	FG%	Field-goal percentage	3P%	3-point field-goal percentage	FT%	Free-throw percentage
**Bold**	Career best	°	League leader

=== WNBA ===
WNBA regular season statistics
Year	Team	GP	GS	MPG	FG%	3P%	FT%	RPG	APG	SPG	BPG	TO	PPG
2002	Cleveland	31	2	12.6	.291	.362	.750	0.8	1.3	0.4	0.1	1.1	2.7
**Career**	1 year, 1 team	31	2	12.6	.291	.362	.750	0.8	1.3	0.4	0.1	1.1	2.7

=== College ===
NCAA statistics
Year	Team	GP	Points	FG%	3P%	FT%	RPG	APG	SPG	BPG	PPG
1998–99	Florida	**33**	428	**39.1**	**35.5**	50.2	3.3	**7.5**	2.4	0.0	13.0
1999-00	Florida	15	120	35.0	28.6	**90.3**	1.7	3.7	1.9	0.0	8.0
2000–01	Florida	29	**572**	38.2	31.4	80.6	2.6	4.3	2.6	0.0	**19.7**
2001–02	Florida	29	460	33.8	32.9	72.4	**3.7**	4.9	**3.1**	**0.1**	15.9
**Career**		106	1580	36.8	32.4	78.8	3.0	5.4	2.6	0.0	14.9

== See also ==
- List of Florida Gators in the WNBA
- List of University of Florida alumni
