= New Mexico Highlands University =

Public university in Las Vegas, New Mexico, US

Coordinates: 35°35′46″N 105°13′15″W

- Former names: New Mexico Normal School (1893–1902); New Mexico Normal University (1902–1941)
- Motto: Artes, Scientiae, Humanitates
- Type: Public research university
- Established: 1893
- Academic affiliations: Space-grant
- President: Neil Woolf
- Students: 2,842 (fall 2023)
- Undergraduates: 1,732 (fall 2023)
- Postgraduates: 1,110 (fall 2023)
- Location: Las Vegas, New Mexico, United States
- Campus: Suburban
- Colors: Purple and White
- Nickname: Cowboys and Cowgirls
- Sporting affiliations: NCAA Division II – Rocky Mountain
- Website: nmhu.edu
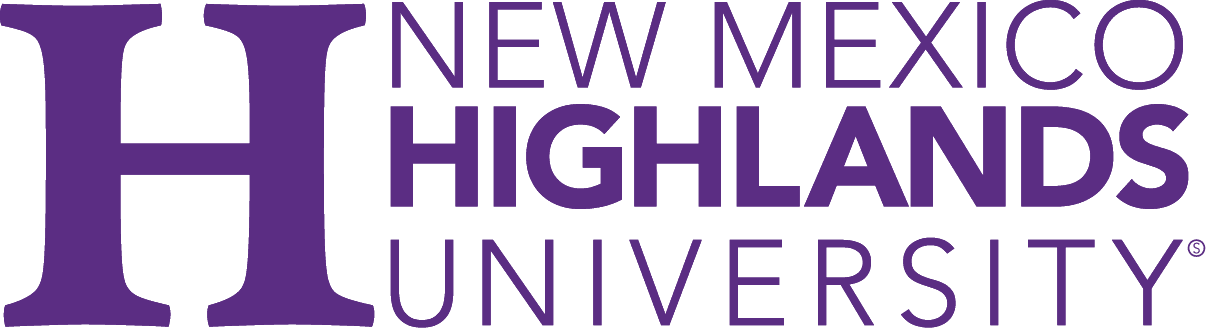

New Mexico Highlands University (NMHU or Highlands) is a public research university in Las Vegas, New Mexico, United States. Founded in 1893, it has satellite campuses in Santa Fe, Albuquerque, Rio Rancho, Farmington and Roswell. NMHU has an average annual enrollment of approximately 3,000 students and offers undergraduate and graduate degree programs across six schools and colleges.

== History ==
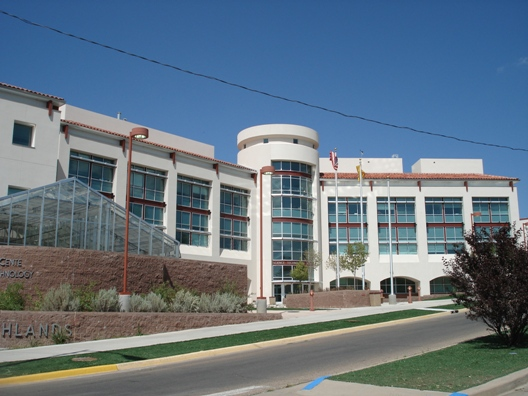
Ivan Hilton Science Center

NMHU was first established as "New Mexico Normal School" in 1893, with prominent archaeologist Edgar Lee Hewett serving as its first president. The institution became "New Mexico Normal University" in 1902, and primarily offered teacher education; it adopted its current name of New Mexico Highlands University in 1941, as it expanded its programs beyond teaching. NMHU now offers graduate and undergraduate programs in arts and sciences, business, education, nursing, and social work.

Located in Las Vegas, a city with a population of over 13,000, Highlands' main campus is close to recreational and wilderness areas and is within an hour's drive of Santa Fe and two hours from Albuquerque.

The majority of NMHU's approximately 3,765 students are from New Mexico and Latino; the university is recognized as a Hispanic Serving Institution by the U.S. Department of Education, which denotes a total undergraduate enrollment that is one-quarter or more Hispanic. Highlands' programs explicitly focus on its multiethnic student body, especially the Latino and American Indian cultures distinctive of New Mexico.

In November 2025, the American Council on Education designated New Mexico Highlands University a research university for the first time, shortly after the school announced the launch of its inaugural doctoral program in nursing beginning in spring 2026. NMHU is also planning to offer doctorate degrees in education and social work "in the near future".

== Accreditation ==
NMHU is accredited by the Higher Learning Commission and also has specialty accreditations for many programs. The School of Education received full accreditation by the National Council for Accreditation of Teacher Education (NCATE) in 2012. The School of Business is accredited by the Association of Collegiate Business Schools and Programs (ACBSP). The School of Social Work is accredited by the Council on Social Work Education (CSWE). The School of Social and Behavioral Sciences is accredited by the Master's in Psychology and Counseling Accreditation Council (MPCAC). The Department of Forestry is accredited by the Society of American Foresters (SAF).

== Academics ==
NMHU has several bachelor's and master's degree programs spanning six schools and colleges; these include business administration, counseling, nursing, social work, and the natural sciences. The school is launching a doctorate in nursing in spring 2026 and has announced plans for doctoral programs in education and social work.

According to U.S. News & World Report (USNWR), NMHU is one of the top 100 schools for economically disadvantaged students and ranks among the top 45-59 public schools nationwide. Out of 118 "Regional Universities West" in the 2026 USNWR rankings, Highlands ranked No. 97 overall, No. 52 among public schools, and No. 75 on social mobility.

NMHU is among the top 12 percent of schools in the 2022 Social Mobility Index, which measures the extent to which institutions provide opportunities for students with family incomes below the national median, based on metrics such as tuition cost, indebtedness among graduates, and post-graduate employment.

== Student life ==
Undergraduate demographics as of Fall 2023
Race and ethnicity	Total
Hispanic	61%
White	14%
American Indian/Alaska Native	9%
Black	6%
International student	5%
Two or more races	3%
Unknown	3%
Economic diversity
Low-income (Note: The percentage of students who received an income-based federal Pell grant intended for low-income students.)	52%
Affluent (Note: The percentage of students who are a part of the American middle class at the bare minimum.)	48%

== Athletics ==
NMHU's athletic teams are nicknamed the Cowboys / Cowgirls and compete in the NCAA's Division II Rocky Mountain Athletic Conference. Ten varsity athletics programs are offered, including women's soccer, men's and women's cross-country, women's track and field, volleyball, men's and women's basketball, wrestling, baseball, softball and football.

== Statewide centers ==
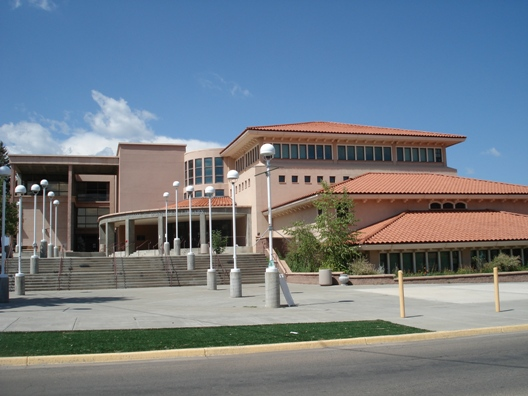
Donnelly Library

In the 1997–98 academic year, New Mexico Highlands University established an extended learning center in Rio Rancho and began offering upper-division undergraduate and graduate courses in business, accounting, education, and social work. The center has since added studies in criminal justice, public affairs administration, computer science and general and school counseling. NMHU also has centers in Albuquerque, Santa Fe, and Farmington.

== Notable alumni ==
- S. Omar Barker, legislator, soldier, writer
- Mary Camille Skora Bohannon, radio news anchor/reporter
- Mark Cotney, professional football player
- Charlie Cowan, professional football player
- Bill Dinwiddie, professional basketball player
- Carl Garrett, professional football player
- Len Garrett, professional football player
- Reggie Garrett, professional football player
- María Dolores Gonzáles, leader of bilingual education in New Mexico
- Anthony Edwards, professional football player
- Eddie Guerrero (1967–2005), professional wrestler
- Keith Jardine, football player; retired mixed martial artist, formerly for the Ultimate Fighting Championship, Strikeforce, and King of the Cage
- Leroy Lamis, sculptor
- Ben Ray Lujan, U.S. Senator from New Mexico (2021–present), former U.S. Representative from New Mexico (2009-2021)
- Ray Leger, educator and member of the New Mexico Senate
- Laura Montoya, New Mexico State Treasurer
- Chris Newsome, professional basketball player
- Frank Olmstead, mayor of Las Vegas, New Mexico and 18th Auditor of New Mexico
- Lionel Taylor, professional football player
- Patsy Trujillo, member of the New Mexico House of Representatives
- Kevon Williams, USA rugby player
- Sam Williams, professional football player
- Don Woods, professional football player
