= LaQuan Stallworth =

American basketball player

Personal information
- Born: Texas
- Listed height: 5 ft 7 in (1.70 m)
- Listed weight: 145 lb (66 kg)

Career information
- High school: Silsbee (Silsbee, Texas)
- College: Louisiana Tech (1995–1999)
- Playing career: 1999–2009 (FIBA) Texas HS Basketball Hall of Fame Class of 2025 Texas Black Sports Hall of Fame Class of 2026
- Position: Guard
- Number: 10
- Coaching career: Houston Spirit /Houston Red Storm (2013-present)- ABA–present

Career highlights
- Texas HS Basketball Hall of Fame Class 2025; Texas Black Sports Hall of Fame Class 2026; All-Sun Belt Team (1998); Sun Belt Defensive Player of the Year (1997); 3× Defensive Player of the Year; 1x Texas state champion game; 1x Texas state final four; NCAA champion runner-up; 2 Final Four / 1 Elite 8; Top 100 player all time in Texas; HS All-American; 4x All-State Team; 2x All-State Tournament Team; 1x TX HS Player of the Year; 1x Female Athlete of the Year; HS Newcomer of the Year; HS Ranked Top 20 in the Nation; TABC All-Star; USA Junior Team; Leading Scorer in Israel 37.8 points
- / Undrafted.html Stats at Basketball Reference

LaQuan Stallworth (born May 17) is a former professional women's basketball player. She played for coach Leon Barmore and Kim Mulkey to play for Louisiana Tech University. After successful collegiate playing years, LaQuan took her talents overseas for the next 8 years.

== Professional ==
Stallworth went to play international basketball for FIBA Maccabi Ashdod in Ashdod, Israel, Dynamo Kursk in Kursk, Russia, Sweden, Switzerland, USA Junior Olympic Team, China, Germany (Halle), and Ireland for Burnell. Stallworth was on the practice squad 2 times for WNBA Houston Comets (99 and 01)undrafted WNBA. Then 3 years of playing for the Adidas Travel Team. Stallworth retired from basketball in 2009. Stallworth is coach for the Houston Spirit and Houston Red Storm ABA (2013–present). She also train and develop the youth, participate in coaching AAU.

2018 - Named Coach of the Year - Texas Basketball Association

Texas HS Basketball Hall of Fame Class 2025

Stallworth’s Living Museum

Texas Black Sports Hall of Fame class of 2026

== USA ==
1998 Jones Cup Team

== College ==
Attended Louisiana Tech University, LaQuan has a Bachelor’s of Science in Computer Information Systems. LaTech women's basketball during her years went to 1 National championship as the runner-up, semi finals in the final four, and 2 years in the final 8 of the NCAA championships. LaQuan currently holds several records at Louisiana Tech such as Defensive Player of the Year (3 years), Most Steals in Game, #3 in Assist, #1 in Most Assist in a Game, and Most NCAA Tournaments and the 2nd Player in Tech history to record over 1000 pts and 500 assists. She holds record for Most Assist in NCAA Tournament.

BASKETBALL WALL OF FAME

== High school ==
LaQuan attended Silsbee High school, which was coached by Kim Albers, started all 4 years, 2 State Tournaments Championships Runner-up and Gatorade All-American throughout all 4 years. She received awards such as MVP of District (4 years) and All-State 1st Team (4 years). Newcomer of the Year as a freshman in high school. Stallworth's high school jersey was retired in 1995. She recorded over 3,349 points in her high school career. Stallworth received the proclamation from the Mayor of Silsbee and placed on the Wall of Fame at Silsbee High School in 2016. She was named one of the Top 100 Century athletes in the State of Texas. She is named one of the greatest basketball player in the State of Texas.

=== Achievements ===
- Louisiana Tech Lady Techsters basketball Single-Game Steals Record
- Louisiana Tech Lady Techsters basketball 3rd All-Time Assists Leader
- Louisiana Tech Lady Techsters basketball 1st Single-Game Assists Record
- NCAA Tournament Assists Leader
- 2nd Player in Louisiana Tech Lady Techsters basketball history to record over 1000 points and 500 assists

== Career statistics ==
Legend
GP	Games played	GS	Games started	MPG	Minutes per game	RPG	Rebounds per game
APG	Assists per game	SPG	Steals per game	BPG	Blocks per game	PPG	Points per game
TO	Turnovers per game	FG%	Field-goal percentage	3P%	3-point field-goal percentage	FT%	Free-throw percentage
**Bold**	Career best	°	League leader

=== College ===
Year	Team	GP	GS	MPG	FG%	3P%	FT%	RPG	APG	SPG	BPG	TO	PPG
1995–96	Louisiana Tech	31	2	-	37.4	33.1	82.5	2.2	2.5	0.6	**0.2**	-	4.7
1996–97	Louisiana Tech	**35**	33	-	38.4	38.2	89.4	3.2	6.9	**1.6**	0.1	-	10.1
1997–98	Louisiana Tech	**35**	33	-	**45.8**	**33.3**	**92.3**	**3.9**	**6.4**	**1.6**	0.1	-	**11.4**
1998-99	Louisiana Tech	35	34	-	44.5	39.1	88.5	4.4	4.8	0.6	**0.2**	-	12.7
**Career**		136	-	-	41.5	36.0	88.1	3.4	5.2	1.3	0.1	-	9.7
Statistics retrieved from Sports-Reference.

== Personal ==
LaQuan is an active member of the NAACP. She started playing basketball at the age of 4 years old. LaQuan is also a member of Delta Sigma Theta sorority. Stallworth wrote, produced, and directed her own indie film "Caught Between the Two" which discusses relationship issues and it was released in 2016 on Amazon.com. Stallworth will be working on her 2nd film "Sins of a Scorned Wife" for 2017 to be released late 2017 or early 2018. It was released in May 2019. The film stars Paul Ynfante, Whitney Skye, and debuting actor Joseph “JoJo” Brooks. Stallworth also coached in the men's American Basketball Association (ABA) as the head coach for the Houston Red Storm and minor league basketball team the Houston Spirit.

WALL OF FAME - BASKETBALL GREAT
