= Curtis Buckley =

American football player and coach (born 1970)

No. 28, 25, 26
- Position: Safety

Personal information
- Born: September 25, 1970 (age 56); Oakdale, Louisiana, U.S.
- Listed height: 6 ft 0 in (1.83 m)
- Listed weight: 186 lb (84 kg)

Career information
- High school: Silsbee (Silsbee, Texas)
- College: East Texas State
- NFL draft: 1993: undrafted

Career history
- Tampa Bay Buccaneers (1993–1995); San Francisco 49ers (1996–1998); New York Giants (1998); Washington Redskins (1999–2000)

Awards and highlights
- As player: Texas Junior College All-Conference (1990); 2× All-LSC First-team (1991, 1992); Second-team All-American (1992)

Career NFL statistics
- Tackles: 5
- Fumble recoveries: 5
- Stats at Pro Football Reference

Curtis LaDonn Buckley (born September 25, 1970) is an American former professional football player who was a cornerback in the National Football League (NFL) for the Tampa Bay Buccaneers, San Francisco 49ers, New York Giants, and Washington Redskins. He played college football at Kilgore College for two years and then East Texas State University (now Texas A&M University–Commerce), where he was a two-time All-American and two-time first-team all-conference selection.

== Early life ==
Buckley was born in Oakdale, Louisiana, and then moved to the Southeast Texas town of Silsbee. He attended Silsbee High School, where he was a standout in football. After graduation, Buckley took a scholarship to attend Kilgore College to play football.

== College career ==
=== Kilgore College ===
Buckley played two years for the Kilgore College Rangers football team, from 1989 to 1990. During the 1990 season he was All-Conference, helping the Rangers to a 9-2 record and a Texas Junior College Conference championship and a victory in the 1990 Shrine Bowl.

=== East Texas State ===
Buckley played for two years at East Texas State in Commerce under coach Eddie Vowell. During the 1991 season, Buckley led a Lion defense that was a top five ranked defense nationally and was first-team All-Conference and Honorable Mention All-American at Safety. The Lions finished second in the Lone Star Conference with an 8-4-1 record and qualified for the NCAA Division II playoffs, finishing as national quarterfinalists and the 19th ranked team in the country. During the 1991 season, in a game against eventual national champion Pittsburg State, his hit on Pittsburg State quarterback Brian Hutchins broke the quarterback's collarbone and helped the Lions take down the Gorillas, 20-13 to vault them to a # 4 national ranking. In the 1992 season, Buckley once again was First-team All-Conference and was Second-team All-American as the Lions finished 8-3 and ranked 14th in the nation.

== Professional career ==
Buckley went undrafted in the 1993 NFL draft but signed with the Tampa Bay Buccaneers. Head coach Sam Wyche was preparing to cut him in preseason before Buckley impressed his coaches by performing a flip on the field. Buckley became a fan favorite for his punishing hits on kick coverage and his propensity to perform acrobatics such as backflips in the end zone prior to kickoffs that followed Buccaneers' scores. With the addition of Kenneth Gant, the Bucs' other gunner, Buckley and Gant took it upon themselves to stoke the crowd after every score, with Gant's "shark dance" building the crowd into a crescendo that culminated in Buckley's flip just as the ball was kicked. In 1994, Buckley knocked Brian Mitchell unconscious during a Week 14 game. Buckley was not penalized, but was later fined. Both Wyche and Mitchell said that they thought that it was a clean hit. Buckley was waived by the Buccaneers after four seasons and spent three seasons with the San Francisco 49ers before brief stints with the Giants and Redskins. He was named a Pro Bowl alternate three times as a special teamer.

== Personal life ==
Buckley currently works as a behavioral health specialist in Dallas and resides in Mesquite, Texas with his family.
