= María Dolores Gonzáles (educator) =

Bilingual educator (1917-1975

- Born: February 25, 1917; Pecos, New Mexico
- Died: March 18, 1975 (aged 58); Albuquerque, New Mexico
- Occupation: Educator

María Dolores Gonzáles (1917–1975), known more popularly by her middle name Dolores, was an educator in New Mexico who was on the forefront of bilingual educator for Spanish language education programs. She was called "La Doctora" after receiving her PhD.

== Biography ==
María Dolores Gonzáles was born on February 25, 1917, in Pecos, New Mexico to parents Geronimo and Paulita Rivera de Gonzales. She was the third of nine children and called "Lola" as a nickname.

In 1940, census records indicate that she was married to Carlos Gonzales.

=== Education and career ===
Gonzáles attended Pecos public schools during her youth. She attended Highlands University and received a bachelor's degree in elementary education and English.

Gonzáles taught in Pecos for 17 years. She was a county principal for San Miguel County.

She attended University of Columbia for her master's degree, and Pennsylvania State University for her doctorate.

Gonzáles traveled to Latin America as an elementary advisor to the United States Agency for International Development of Education in Central and South America. In this role she worked with teachers in Latin American countries to compile textbooks for Spanish language classes.

Gonzales was an associate professor of Elementary Education at the University of New Mexico. She led the Bilingual Education Program Material Production Institute and developed the Tierra de Encanto or Land of Enchantment series. These were bilingual readers for elementary students that provided lessons in formal Spanish for students that spoke Spanish at home.

=== Death and legacy ===
Gonzales died on March 18, 1975, in Albuquerque, New Mexico.

In July 1975, the National Institute on Access to Higher Education for the Mexican American was dedicated in her memory.

The Dolores Gonzales Elementary School in Albuquerque, New Mexico is named for her. The school has a Dual Language Immersion Program and recognizes her work in promoting bilingual education.

At the school there is a marker from the New Mexico Historic Marker Initiative.

== See also ==
- Bilingual education
