= Silsbee High School =

Location
- 1575 Hwy 96 North; Silsbee, Texas, Hardin County 77656; United States; 30.344°N 94.153°W

Information
- Type: Public
- Opened: 2000
- School district: Silsbee Independent School District
- Principal: Scott Schwartz
- Teaching staff: 62.50 (FTE)
- Grades: 9-12
- Enrollment: 825 (2023–2024)
- Student to teacher ratio: 13.20
- Colors: Maroon and white
- Mascot: Tiger
- Newspaper: Focus
- Website: shs.silsbeeisd.org

Silsbee High School is a public high school in Silsbee, Hardin County, Texas. It is the only high school in the Silsbee Independent School District. Their mascot is the Tiger.

== Controversy ==
The school and the school district have been criticized for expelling a cheerleader from the school's cheerleading squad because of her refusal to cheer for a basketball player who pleaded guilty to sexually assaulting her. The charges were dropped down to assault a year later and the player was given probation. School officials also encouraged the victim to "keep a low profile" and avoid the school cafeteria.

The Fifth Circuit Court of Appeals ruled in November 2010 that the victim — who is identified only as H.S. — had no right to refuse to applaud her attacker, because as a cheerleader in uniform, she was an agent of the school. The Fifth Circuit dismissed her case as "frivolous" and sanctioned the girl, ordering her family to pay the school district's $35,000–45,000 legal fees. A later judgment ruled that one of the claims was not frivolous and ordered the amount owed recalculated based on this finding. The Supreme Court declined to review the case.

== Notable alumni and faculty ==
- Kalon Barnes, professional football cornerback who is a free agent
- Curtis Buckley - played cornerback for four seasons for the Tampa Bay Buccaneers, three seasons for the San Francisco 49ers, and one season for the New York Giants and the Washington Redskins
- William Graham - played safety for six seasons for the Detroit Lions
- H. Palmer Hall - poet, author, editor and librarian who taught two years at Silsbee
- Mark Henry - Olympic weightlifter and professional wrestler
- James Hunter - played seven seasons as a defensive back for the Detroit Lions
- Chloe Jones, adult actress and model
- Brandi McCain - basketball player, played one season with the WNBA Los Angeles Sparks
