= Jim Trujillo =

American politician (1939/1940 – 2024)

Member of the New Mexico House of Representatives from the 45th district
- In office 2003 – September 29, 2020
- Preceded by: Patsy Trujillo
- Succeeded by: Linda Serrato

Personal details
- Born: June 10, 1939
- Died: March 3, 2024 (aged 84) Santa Fe, New Mexico, U.S.
- Party: Democratic
- Education: College of Santa Fe

Jim Rudolfo Trujillo (June 10, 1939 – March 3, 2024) was an American politician and businessman who served as a Democratic member of the New Mexico House of Representatives from 2003 to 2020. Trujillo was appointed by Governor Bill Richardson to fill the vacancy caused by the resignation of Patsy Trujillo (no relation).

== Education ==
Jim R. Trujillo was born on June 10, 1939. He graduated from Pojoaque High School and studied architecture at the College of Santa Fe (now the Santa Fe University of Art and Design).

== Career ==
A businessman, Trujillo owned and operated a store. He was appointed to the New Mexico House of Representatives in 2003. In 2019, he announced that he would not seek re-election in 2020.

On September 29, 2020, Trujillo resigned from his seat prior to the end of his term, citing health concerns. After Trujillo's resignation, it was announced that the Santa Fe County Commission would appoint an interim successor to serve for the remainder of Trujillo's term. In October 2020, Linda Serrato, a businesswoman and former political advisor to Ben Ray Luján, was selected to fill the remainder of Trujillo's term.

== Death ==
Trujillo died from kidney failure in Santa Fe on March 3, 2024, at the age of 84.
