= Woodlawn Garden of Memories Cemetery =

United States historic place in Houston, Texas

- U.S. National Register of Historic Places
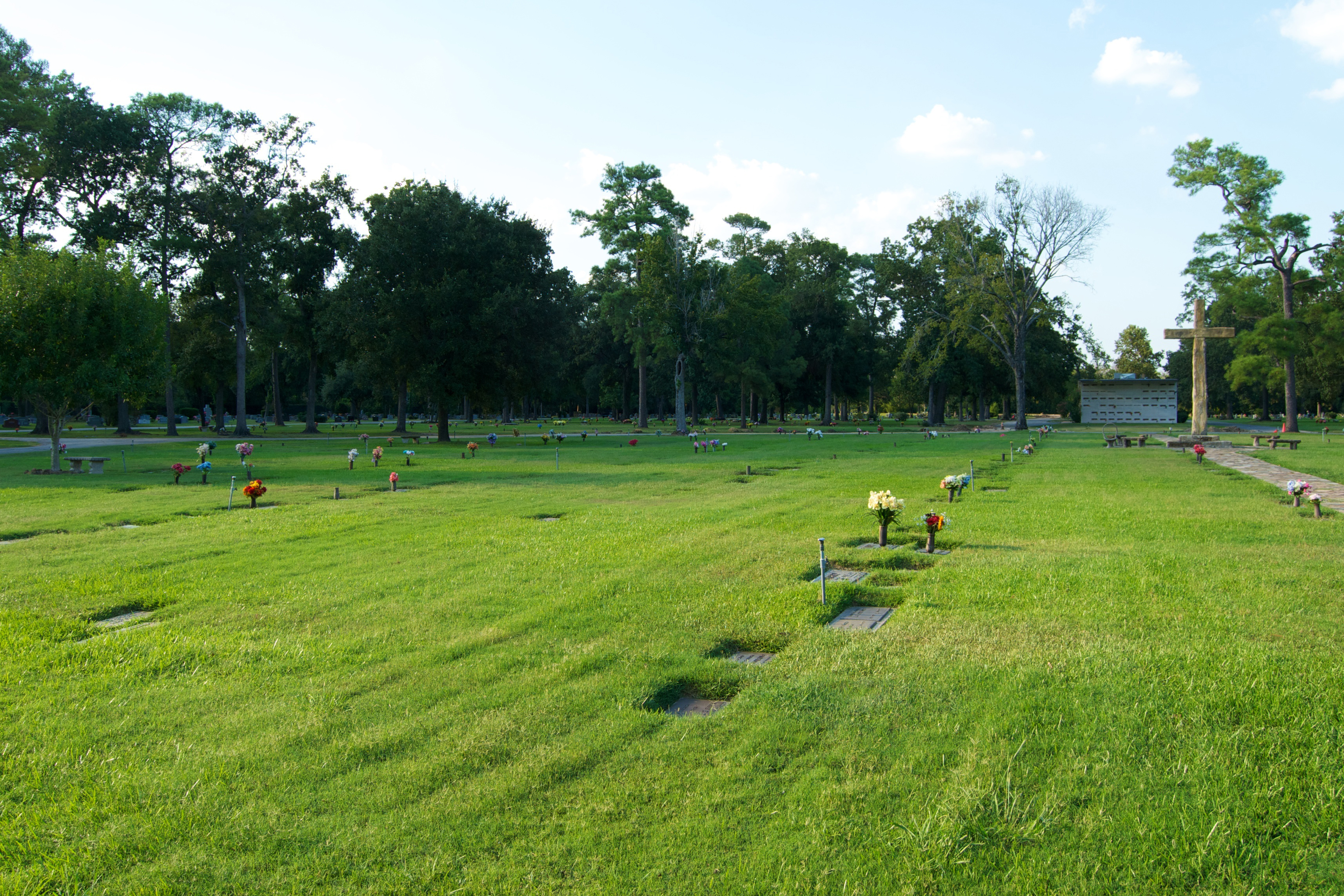

- Location within Texas Location within the United States
- Location: 1101 Antoine; Houston, Texas
- Coordinates: 29°47′18″N 95°28′41″W
- Area: 34.8 acres (14.1 ha)
- Built: 1931
- Architect: Dionicio Rodriguez
- Architectural style: Faux bois Sculpture
- MPS: Sculpture by Dionicio Rodriguez in Texas MPS
- NRHP reference No.: 04001174
- Added to NRHP: October 22, 2004

The Woodlawn Garden of Memories is a cemetery in Houston, Texas which is included in the National Register of Historic Places. NRHP lists Dionicio Rodriguez as the cemetery's architect.

== Notable burials ==
- Jennifer Ertman and Elizabeth Peña (1977 & 1978 – both died 1993), murder victims
- Chloe Jones (1975–2005), pornographic actress
- Marvin Zindler (1921–2007), TV reporter
