= Kalon Barnes =

American football player (born 1998)

Profile
- Position: Cornerback

Personal information
- Born: December 16, 1998 (age 27); Silsbee, Texas, U.S.
- Listed height: 5 ft 11 in (1.80 m)
- Listed weight: 187 lb (85 kg)

Career information
- High school: Silsbee
- College: Baylor (2018–2021)
- NFL draft: 2022: 7th round, 242nd overall pick

Career history
- Carolina Panthers (2022)*; Miami Dolphins (2022)*; Minnesota Vikings (2022); Pittsburgh Steelers (2023)*; New York Jets (2023)*; Cleveland Browns (2023)*; Pittsburgh Steelers (2024)*; San Antonio Brahmas (2025)*; Edmonton Elks (2025)*
- * Offseason or practice squad member only
- Stats at Pro Football Reference

Kalon Barnes (born December 16, 1998) is an American professional football cornerback. He played college football for the Baylor Bears, and was selected by the Carolina Panthers in the seventh round of the 2022 NFL draft.

== Early life ==
Barnes played wide receiver at Silsbee High School. Barnes was a three-star recruit coming out of high school and committed to play football at Baylor on May 4, 2017.

Also competing in track and field, Barnes won both the 100 metres and 200 metres at the UIL Track and Field Championships in 2017 and 2018, consecutively. He ran a wind-assisted (+3.2 m/s) 10.04 seconds in the 100 metres in 2018.

== College career ==
Barnes converted from wide receiver to cornerback before the 2018 season.

== Professional career ==
=== Pre-draft ===
Barnes ran a 4.23-second 40-yard dash at the NFL Combine, the third-fastest time at the combine since electronic timing was implemented in 1999 (behind only Xavier Worthy's and John Ross' 40-yard dash times, 4.21 seconds and 4.22 seconds respectively), and the fastest time by a defensive back.

Pre-draft measurables
Height	Weight	Arm length	Hand span	Wingspan	40-yard dash	10-yard split	20-yard split	20-yard shuttle	Three-cone drill	Vertical jump	Broad jump	Bench press
5 ft 11 1/2 in (1.82 m)	183 lb (83 kg)	31 3/4 in (0.81 m)	9 7/8 in (0.25 m)	6 ft 4 3/4 in (1.95 m)	4.23 s	1.49 s	2.50 s	4.58 s	7.44 s	40.0 in (1.02 m)	11 ft 1 in (3.38 m)	6 reps
All values from NFL Combine/Pro Day

=== Carolina Panthers ===
Barnes was selected by the Carolina Panthers in the seventh round (242nd overall) of the 2022 NFL draft. Panthers head coach Matt Rhule had coached Barnes for two seasons at Baylor, but downplayed his familiarity with Barnes as a reason for drafting him, instead citing his rare speed and athleticism. Barnes was waived by the Panthers as part of final roster cuts on August 30, 2022.

=== Miami Dolphins ===
On September 1, 2022, Barnes was signed to the practice squad of the Miami Dolphins.

=== Minnesota Vikings ===
On December 14, 2022, Barnes was signed by the Minnesota Vikings from the Dolphins practice squad. He was waived by the Vikings as part of final roster cuts on August 28, 2023

=== Pittsburgh Steelers (first stint) ===
On September 15, 2023, Barnes was signed to the Pittsburgh Steelers' practice squad. On September 26, Barnes was released from the Steelers practice squad.

=== New York Jets ===
On October 3, 2023, Barnes was signed to the New York Jets' practice squad. He was released on December 22.

=== Cleveland Browns ===
On January 10, 2024, Barnes was signed to the Cleveland Browns' practice squad. He became a free agent when his practice squad contract expired at the end of the season.

=== Pittsburgh Steelers (second stint) ===
On January 23, 2024, Barnes signed a reserve/futures contract with the Steelers. He was waived with an injury designation on August 12, and released on August 19.

=== San Antonio Brahmas ===
On December 4, 2024, Barnes signed with the San Antonio Brahmas of the United Football League (UFL). He was released on March 20, 2025.

=== Edmonton Elks ===
On April 9, 2025, Barnes signed with the Edmonton Elks of the Canadian Football League (CFL). He was released during training camp on May 14.
