= 1997–98 Clemson Tigers women's basketball team =

Women's college basketball season

1997–98 Clemson Tigers women's basketball

NCAA Tournament, Second Round
- Conference: Atlantic Coast Conference

Ranking
- Coaches: No. 21
- AP: No. 14
- Record: 25–8 (12–4 ACC)
- Head coach: Jim Davis (11th season)
- Home arena: Littlejohn Coliseum

The 1997–98 Clemson Tigers women's basketball team represented Clemson University during the 1997–98 NCAA Division I women's basketball season. The Tigers were led by eleventh year head coach Jim Davis. The Tigers, members of the Atlantic Coast Conference, played their home games at Littlejohn Coliseum.

== Schedule ==
Date time, TV	Rank^{#}	Opponent^{#}	Result	Record	Site city, state
November 14, 1997*		at Tennessee Tech; Preseason NWIT	W 61–46	1–0	Eblen Center; Cookeville, Tennessee
November 16, 1997*		at Northwestern; Preseason NWIT	L 66–70	1–1	Welsh–Ryan Arena; Evanston, Illinois
November 23, 1997*		Boise State	W 81–65	2–1	Littlejohn Coliseum; Clemson, South Carolina
November 25, 1997*		South Carolina rivalry	W 73–59	3–1	Littlejohn Coliseum; Clemson, South Carolina
November 30, 1997*		at No. 13 Georgia	L 67–70	3–2	Stegeman Coliseum; Athens, Georgia
December 4, 1997*		at Furman	W 83–70	4–2	Timmons Arena; Greenville, South Carolina
December 13, 1997		No. 11 Duke	W 72–61	5–2 (1–0)	Littlejohn Coliseum; Clemson, South Carolina
December 16, 1997		at Florida State	W 87–84	6–2 (2–0)	Tallahassee–Leon County Civic Center; Tallahassee, Florida
December 20, 1997*		vs. New Orleans	W 101–58	7–2 (2–0)	Myrtle Beach Convention Center; Myrtle Beach, South Carolina
December 22, 1997*		vs. Temple; Bahamas Shootout	W 65–39	8–2 (2–0)	Nassau, Bahamas
December 23, 1997*		vs. Idaho State; Bahamas Shootout	W 58–50	9–2 (2–0)	Nassau, Bahamas
December 30, 1997*		Winthrop	W 89–44	10–2 (2–0)	Littlejohn Coliseum; Clemson, South Carolina
January 2, 1998		No. 5 North Carolina	W 77–63	11–2 (3–0)	Littlejohn Coliseum; Clemson, South Carolina
January 5, 1998		No. 9 Virginia	W 74–67	12–2 (4–0)	Littlejohn Coliseum; Clemson, South Carolina
January 8, 1998		at No. 13 NC State	L 51–73	12–3 (4–1)	Reynolds Coliseum; Raleigh, North Carolina
January 11, 1998		Maryland	W 73–51	13–3 (5–1)	Littlejohn Coliseum; Clemson, South Carolina
January 15, 1998	No. 23	at Wake Forest	W 61–60	14–3 (6–1)	LJVM Coliseum; Winston-Salem, North Carolina
January 22, 1998	No. 19	Georgia Tech	W 79–56	15–3 (7–1)	Littlejohn Coliseum; Clemson, South Carolina
January 25, 1998	No. 19	at No. 24 Duke	L 59–78	15–4 (7–2)	Cameron Indoor Stadium; Durham, North Carolina
January 29, 1998	No. 21	Florida State	W 85–56	16–4 (8–2)	Littlejohn Coliseum; Clemson, South Carolina
February 1, 1998	No. 21	at No. 6 North Carolina	L 59–80	16–5 (8–3)	Carmichael Arena; Chapel Hill, North Carolina
February 5, 1998	No. 22	at No. 13 Virginia	L 55–72	16–6 (8–4)	University Hall; Charlottesville, Virginia
February 7, 1998	No. 22	No. 9 NC State	W 68–58 ^{OT}	17–6 (9–4)	Littlejohn Coliseum; Clemson, South Carolina
February 10, 1998*	No. 21	Wofford	W 102–55	18–6 (9–4)	Littlejohn Coliseum; Clemson, South Carolina
February 12, 1998	No. 21	at Maryland	W 74–70	19–6 (10–4)	Cole Field House; College Park, Maryland
February 15, 1998	No. 21	Wake Forest	W 64–41	20–6 (11–4)	Littlejohn Coliseum; Clemson, South Carolina
February 18, 1998*	No. 19	UNC Asheville	W 87–50	21–6 (11–4)	Littlejohn Coliseum; Clemson, South Carolina
February 22, 1998	No. 19	at Georgia Tech	W 89–58	22–6 (12–4)	Alexander Memorial Coliseum; Atlanta, Georgia
ACC Tournament
February 27, 1998*	No. 16	vs. Florida State; ACC Tournament quarterfinal	W 85–68	23–6 (12–4)	Independence Arena; Charlotte, North Carolina
February 28, 1998*	No. 16	vs. Maryland; ACC Tournament semifinal	W 63–44	24–6 (12–4)	Independence Arena; Charlotte, North Carolina
March 1, 1998*	No. 16	vs. No. 10 North Carolina; ACC Tournament final	L 50–81	24–7 (12–4)	Independence Arena; Charlotte, North Carolina
NCAA Tournament
March 14, 1998*	No. 14	vs. Miami; NCAA Tournament first round	W 60–49	25–7 (12–4)	Thomas Assembly Center; Ruston, Louisiana
March 16, 1998*	No. 14	at No. 4 Louisiana Tech; NCAA Tournament second round	L 52–74	25–8 (12–4)	Thomas Assembly Center; Ruston, Louisiana
*Non-conference game. ^{#}Rankings from AP Poll. (#) Tournament seedings in parentheses.
