= Patsy Trujillo =

American politician

Member of the New Mexico House of Representatives from the 45th district
- In office 1995–2003
- Succeeded by: Jim Trujillo

Personal details
- Born: 1953 (age 72–73) Santa Fe, New Mexico, U.S.
- Party: Democratic
- Education: New Mexico Highlands University (BA)

Patsy Trujillo (born 1953) is an American politician who served as a member of the New Mexico House of Representatives from 1995 until her resignation in 2003.

== Early life and education ==
Trujillo was born in Santa Fe, New Mexico and attended New Mexico Highlands University.

== Career ==
Elected to the House in 1994, she assumed office in 1995. Trujillo resigned from the House in 2003 and was succeeded by businessman Jim Trujillo (no relation). After resigning from the House, Trujillo worked in the administration of then-Governor Bill Richardson, where she served as the deputy director of the New Mexico Department of Aging and Long-Term Services. She was also appointed to serve as a member of a Latino outreach committee.

In 2007, Trujillo was mentioned as a candidate for New Mexico's 3rd congressional district after incumbent Representative Tom Udall announced that he would run for the United States Senate. Trujillo do not opt to run in the election, and Ben Ray Luján was elected to succeed Udall.

Trujillo served as a Latino outreach advisor on the Barack Obama 2008 presidential campaign.
