= Chloe Jones =

American actress

- Born: Melinda Dee Jones; June 17, 1975; Silsbee, Texas, U.S.
- Died: June 4, 2005 (aged 29); Houston, Texas, U.S.
- Resting place: Woodlawn Garden of Memories Cemetery
- Other name: Melinda Dee Taylor
- Education: Silsbee High School
- Occupations: Adult model; pornographic actress
- Height: 5 ft 6 in (1.68 m)
- Spouse: Michael Taylor
- Children: 3

Chloe Jones (née Melinda Dee Jones; June 17, 1975 – June 4, 2005) was an American pornographic actress.

== Early life and career ==
Melinda Mangoodoo Jones was born June 17, 1975, in Silsbee, Texas, where she also grew up. After graduating from Silspee High School in 1994, she arrived in California with $400 in her pocket to start her acting career. She appeared in Baywatch, Comedy shows, a movie with Anna Nicole Smith, a Marilyn Monroe movie, and more. She later became a Playboy model and appeared in Vanity Fair, Hustler, and Swank. Jones was the Penthouse magazine Pet of the Month in April 1998, and she reluctantly crossed over into adult movies in 2001. Jones signed an exclusive contract with adult film company New Sensations, followed by another contract with Vivid Entertainment in February 2003. Both associations were brief (her contract with Vivid lasted five months). She retired from the adult industry in 2004. After her retirement on camera in 2004, she continued to earn a living as an escort online and still received money from her website. Jones performed in around 18 films during this time. and, in March 2005, Jones appeared in a story in the National Enquirer claiming that Charlie Sheen was among her suitors in February, 2005. Sheen's agent disputed the claim, stating that Sheen had not seen Jones since 1996.

She appeared twice on The Howard Stern Show in 2003.

== Death ==
Jones had been in and out of the hospital for 3 years prior to her death from drug overdoses and complications due to her faulty liver. Since March 2005 her health had deteriorated. Jones died in her sleep at home on June 4, 2005, at around 4:00 am, two weeks shy of her 30th birthday. Her early death has been reported as due to liver failure caused by alcohol and prescription drug abuse. Jones had been on the list for a liver transplant, however people close to her say that she did not take it seriously and continued to drink, eat poorly and continued misusing medications. Jones was survived by her husband, her then 9 year old daughter, her then 8 year old twin sons, her mother Donna and her older sisters Michelle and Melanie. She was buried six days after her death at Woodlawn Garden of Memories Cemetery in Houston, Texas.
