= Silsbee Independent School District =

School district in Texas

Address
- 415 Highway 327 West Silsbee, Texas, 77656; United States

District information
- Type: Public
- Grades: PK–12
- Schools: 4
- NCES District ID: 4840230

Students and staff
- Students: 2,654 (2023–2024)
- Teachers: 200.92 (on an FTE basis) (2023–2024)
- Staff: 220.35 (on an FTE basis) (2023–2024)
- Student–teacher ratio: 13.21 (2023–2024)

Other information
- Website: www.silsbeeisd.org

Silsbee Independent School District is a public school district based in Silsbee, Texas (USA).

In 2009, the school district was rated "academically acceptable" by the Texas Education Agency.

== Schools ==
- Silsbee High (Grades 9-12)
- Edwards-Johnson Memorial Silsbee Middle (Grades 6-8)
- Silsbee Elementary (Grades 1-5)
- Laura Reeves Elementary (Grades PK-K)

== Controversy ==
Silsbee High School, the school district, superintendent Richard Bain, and then-principal Gaye Lokey have been criticized for expelling a cheerleader from the school's cheerleading squad because of her refusal to cheer for a basketball player who was convicted of assault against her, but was let back on the team because he was not convicted of the rape which was alleged to have attended the incident. Rakheem Jamal Bolton pleaded guilty to misdemeanor simple assault, having been originally indicted on a sexual assault charge. The girl's lawyer says the cheerleaders were supposed to yell, "Two, four, six, eight, ten, come on, Rakheem, put it in." School officials advised the cheerleader "to keep a low profile, such as avoiding the school cafeteria and not taking part in homecoming activities." The victim refused to take the "advice" and sued the school for removing her from the squad. The 5th U.S. Circuit of Appeals court later upheld the school's decision, and ordered the rape victim to pay the District's court costs for her lawsuit.

An online petition was formed to raise money for the rape victim and demand a public apology from Silsbee officials. The decision deeming the case "frivolous" and ordering the rape victim to pay the school's legal bills was later overruled.
