= 1998 SEC women's basketball tournament =

American college basketball postseason tournament

- Classification: Division I
- Teams: 12
- Site: Columbus Civic Center; Columbus, GA
- Champions: Tennessee (8th title)
- Winning coach: Pat Summitt (8th title)
- MVP: Chamique Holdsclaw (Tennsessee)
- Attendance: 29,584

The 1998 Southeastern Conference women's basketball tournament was the postseason women's basketball tournament for the Southeastern Conference (SEC) held at the Columbus Civic Center in Columbus, Georgia, from February 26 – March 1, 1998. The Tennessee Lady Volunteers won the tournament and earned an automatic bid to the 1998 NCAA Division I women's basketball tournament.

== Seeds ==
All teams in the conference participated in the tournament. Teams were seeded by their conference record.

Seed	School	Conference record	Overall record	Tiebreaker
1	Tennessee^{‡†}	14–0	39–0	
2	Florida^{†}	10–4	23–9	
3	Alabama^{†}	10–4	24–10	
4	Vanderbilt^{†}	9–5	20–9	
5	Georgia	8–6	17–11	
6	LSU	7–7	19–13	
7	Arkansas	7–7	22–11	
8	Kentucky	5–9	13–15	
9	Mississippi State	4–10	14–15	
10	Auburn	4–10	16–11	
11	South Carolina	3–11	13–15	
12	Ole Miss	3–11	12–19	
‡ – SEC regular season champions, and tournament No. 1 seed. † – Received a bye in the conference tournament. Overall records include all games played in the SEC Tournament.

== Schedule ==
Game	Matchup^{#}	Score
First Round – Thu, Feb 26
1	No. 8 Kentucky vs. No. 9 Mississippi State	48–67
2	No. 5 Georgia vs. No. 12 Ole Miss	73–77
3	No. 7 Arkansas vs. No. 10 Auburn	59–43
4	No. 6 LSU vs. No. 11 South Carolina	61–76
Quarterfinal – Fri, Feb 27
5	No. 1 Tennessee vs. No. 9 Mississippi State	88–60
6	No. 4 Vanderbilt vs. No. 12 Ole Miss	76–64
7	No. 2 Florida vs. No. 7 Arkansas	63–49
8	No. 3 Alabama vs. No. 11 South Carolina	92–72
Semifinal – Sat, Feb 28
9	No. 1 Tennessee vs. No. 4 Vanderbilt	106–45
10	No. 2 Florida vs. No. 3 Alabama	61–74
Championship – Sun, Mar 1
11	No. 1 Tennessee vs. No. 3 Alabama	67–63
# – Rankings denote tournament seed

== Bracket ==
First round Thu, Feb 26
8	Kentucky	48
9	Mississippi State	67
5	Georgia	73
12	Ole Miss	77
7	Arkansas	59
10	Auburn	43
6	LSU	61
11	South Carolina	76

Quarterfinals; Fri, Feb 27
1	Tennessee	88
9	Mississippi State	60
4	Vanderbilt	76
12	Ole Miss	64
2	Florida	63
7	Arkansas	49
3	Alabama	92
11	South Carolina	72

Semifinals; Sat, Feb 28
1	Tennessee	106
4	Vanderbilt	45
2	Florida	61
3	Alabama	74

Championship; Sun, Mar 1
1	Tennessee	67
3	Alabama	63
