= 1998 NCAA Division I women's basketball tournament =

American college basketball tournament

- Teams: 64
- Finals site: Kemper Arena, Kansas City, Missouri
- Champions: Tennessee Volunteers (6th title, 8th title game, 11th Final Four)
- Runner-up: Louisiana Tech Techsters (6th title game, 9th Final Four)
- Semifinalists: NC State Wolfpack (1st Final Four); Arkansas Razorbacks (1st Final Four)
- Winning coach: Pat Summitt (6th title)
- MOP: Chamique Holdsclaw (Tennessee)

The 1998 NCAA Division I women's basketball tournament began on March 13, 1998, and concluded on March 29, 1998, when Tennessee won the national title. The Final Four was held at Kemper Arena in Kansas City, Missouri, on March 27–29, 1998. Tennessee, Louisiana Tech, NC State, and Arkansas qualified for the Final Four. Tennessee and Louisiana Tech won their semi-final Final Four matchups and continued on to the championship. Tennessee defeated Louisiana Tech 93–75 to take their sixth title, and complete an undefeated season (39–0).

For the first time in the history of the women's tournament, and in the 64-team tournament era on both the men's and women's side, two teams – Tennessee and Liberty – entered the tournament unbeaten (this feat was replicated in 2014 by the women's teams from Connecticut and Notre Dame). In the opening round of the Mideast Regional, the top-seed Lady Vols blew out 16th-seeded Liberty 102–58. However, in the West Regional, the expected 1–16 blowout did not happen. In that matchup, Harvard defeated an injury-plagued #1 seed Stanford on its home court 71–67. This was the first time in the men's or women's tournament that a #16 seed had beaten a #1 seed, a feat that would not be repeated until 2018 in the men's tournament. No team seeded lower than 13 has won a round of 64 game in the women's tournament since.

In addition, the 9th-seeded Arkansas made the Final Four, becoming and remaining the lowest seeded team the lowest seeded team to ever reach the Final Four in the women's tournament. Only 10th-seeded Oregon in 2017, 10th-seeded Creighton in 2022 and 11th-seeded Gonzaga in 2011 have even reached an Elite Eight to be in position to break this record. In addition, Arkansas remains the only 9-seed to even reach the Elite Eight in the women's tournament. This is the last time that two number 1 seeds failed to make the Sweet 16, a feat not repeated until 2023 tournament.

== Tournament records ==
- Free throws – Chasity Melvin, North Carolina State, attempted 15 free throws in the semi-final game against Louisiana Tech, setting the record for most free throw attempts in a Final Four game.
- Winning margin – Tennessee defeated Arkansas 86–58 in the semi-final game. The winning margin of 28 points set the record for winning margin in a Final Four game.
- Three-point field goals – Julie Krommenhoek completed eight three-point field goals in a first round game in the West region, setting the record for most three-point field goals scored in an NCAA tournament game.
- Three-point field goal percentage – Kellie Jolly, Tennessee, hit four of five three-point field goal attempts(80%) in the championship game against Louisiana Tech, tying a record for three-point field goal percentage in a Final Four game, held by four other players.
- Steals – Ticha Penicheiro, Old Dominion, recorded fourteen steals, setting the record for most steals in an NCAA tournament game, since the statistic was first recorded in 1988.
- Free throws – Purdue made 39 free throws in a Midwest region first round game against Washington, setting the record for most free throws scored in an NCAA tournament game.
- Field goals made – Chamique Holdsclaw, Tennessee, scored 64 field goals in the tournament, setting the record for most field goals made in a tournament.
- Field goals attempted – Chamique Holdsclaw, Tennessee, attempted 131 field goals in the tournament, setting the record for most field goals attempted in a tournament.
- Steals – Ticha Penicheiro, Old Dominion, recorded 23 steals, setting the record for most steals in an NCAA tournament, since the statistic was first recorded in 1988. Louisville's Emily Engstler tied this record in 2022.
- Furthest advance – Harvard, as a 16 seed, advanced to the second round, representing the only time a 16 seed has advanced.

== Qualifying teams – automatic ==
Sixty-four teams were selected to participate in the 1998 NCAA Tournament. Thirty conferences were eligible for an automatic bid to the 1998 NCAA tournament.

Automatic bids
		Record		
Qualifying school	Conference	Regular Season	Conference	Seed
University of Connecticut	Big East	31–2	17–1	2
Drake University	Missouri Valley Conference	25–4	17–1	5
Fairfield University	MAAC	20–9	14–4	15
Florida International University	Trans America	28–1	15–1	7
Grambling State University	SWAC	23–6	14–2	16
University of Wisconsin–Green Bay	Horizon League	21–8	11–3	14
Harvard University	Ivy League	22–4	12–2	16
College of the Holy Cross	Patriot League	21–8	10–2	14
Howard University	MEAC	23–6	16–2	15
Kent State University	MAC	23–6	18–0	13
Liberty University	Big South Conference	28–0	12–0	16
Louisiana Tech University	Sun Belt Conference	26–3	13–1	3
University of Maine	America East	21–8	13–5	13
University of Memphis	Conference USA	22–7	14–2	5
Middle Tennessee State University	Ohio Valley Conference	18–11	11–7	15
University of Montana	Big Sky Conference	24–5	15–1	14
University of New Mexico	WAC	26–6	10–4	8
University of North Carolina	ACC	24–6	11–5	2
Old Dominion University	Colonial	27–2	16–0	1
Purdue University	Big Ten	20–9	10–6	4
Santa Clara University	West Coast Conference	23–7	11–3	14
St. Francis (PA)	Northeast Conference	22–7	14–2	16
Stanford University	Pac-10	21–5	17–1	1
Stephen F. Austin State University	Southland	25–3	15–1	9
University of Tennessee	SEC	33–0	14–0	1
Texas Tech University	Big 12 Conference	25–4	15–1	1
University of California, Santa Barbara	Big West Conference	26–5	14–1	11
University of North Carolina at Greensboro	Southern Conference	21–8	12–4	15
Virginia Tech	Atlantic 10	21–9	11–5	11
Youngstown State University	Mid-Continent	27–2	15–1	12

== Qualifying teams – at-large ==
Thirty-four additional teams were selected to complete the sixty-four invitations.

At-large bids
		Record		
Qualifying school	Conference	Regular Season	Conference	Seed
University of Alabama	Southeastern	22–9	10–4	2
University of Arizona	Pacific-10	21–6	14–4	3
University of Arkansas	Southeastern	18–10	7–7	9
Clemson University	Atlantic Coast	24–7	12–4	6
Colorado State University	Western Athletic	23–5	11–3	12
Duke University	Atlantic Coast	21–7	13–3	2
University of Florida	Southeastern	21–8	10–4	3
The George Washington University	Atlantic 10	19–9	12–4	10
University of Georgia	Southeastern	17–10	8–6	7
University of Hawaiʻi at Mānoa	Western Athletic	24–3	13–1	8
University of Illinois	Big Ten	18–9	12–4	3
University of Iowa	Big Ten	17–10	13–3	4
Iowa State University	Big 12	24–7	12–4	4
University of Kansas	Big 12	21–8	11–5	5
University of Louisville	Conference USA	19–11	12–4	10
Marquette University	Conference USA	22–6	13–3	10
University of Massachusetts	Atlantic 10	19–10	11–5	13
University of Miami	Big East	19–9	13–5	11
University of Michigan	Big Ten	19–9	10–6	10
Missouri State University	Missouri Valley	24–5	14–4	8
University of Nebraska–Lincoln	Big 12	22–9	11–5	9
North Carolina State University	Atlantic Coast	21–6	12–4	4
University of Notre Dame	Big East	20–9	12–6	9
University of Oregon	Pacific-10	17–9	13–5	12
Rutgers University	Big East	20–9	14–4	5
Southern Methodist University	Western Athletic	21–7	11–3	11
Tulane University	Conference USA	21–6	12–4	12
University of California, Los Angeles	Pacific-10	19–8	14–4	7
University of Utah	Western Athletic	21–5	11–3	7
Vanderbilt University	Southeastern	20–8	9–5	6
University of Virginia	Atlantic Coast	18–9	9–7	6
University of Washington	Pacific-10	18–9	9–9	13
Western Kentucky University	Sun Belt	25–8	12–2	8
University of Wisconsin–Madison	Big Ten	21–9	9–7	6

== Bids by conference ==
Thirty conferences earned an automatic bid. In nineteen cases, the automatic bid was the only representative from the conference. Thirty-four additional at-large teams were selected from eleven of the conferences.

Bids	Conference	Teams
6	Southeastern	Tennessee, Alabama, Arkansas, Florida, Georgia, Vanderbilt
5	Atlantic Coast	North Carolina, Clemson, Duke, North Carolina St., Virginia
5	Big Ten	Purdue, Illinois, Iowa, Michigan, Wisconsin
5	Pacific-10	Stanford, Arizona, Oregon, UCLA, Washington
5	Western Athletic	New Mexico, Colorado St., Hawaii, SMU, Utah
4	Big 12	Texas Tech, Iowa St., Kansas, Nebraska
4	Big East	Connecticut, Miami, Notre Dame, Rutgers
4	Conference USA	Memphis, Louisville, Marquette, Tulane
3	Atlantic 10	Virginia Tech, George Washington, Massachusetts
2	Missouri Valley	Drake, Missouri St.
2	Sun Belt	Louisiana Tech, Western Ky.
1	America East	Maine
1	Big Sky	Montana
1	Big South	Liberty
1	Big West	UC Santa Barb.
1	Colonial	Old Dominion
1	Horizon	Green Bay
1	Ivy	Harvard
1	Metro Atlantic	Fairfield
1	Mid-American	Kent St.
1	Mid-Continent	Youngstown St.
1	Mid-Eastern	Howard
1	Northeast	St. Francis (PA)
1	Ohio Valley	Middle Tenn.
1	Patriot	Holy Cross
1	Southern	UNC Greensboro
1	Southland	Stephen F. Austin
1	Southwestern	Grambling
1	Trans America	FIU
1	West Coast	Santa Clara

== First and second rounds ==
1998 NCAA NCAA first and second round venues

In 1998, the field remained at 64 teams. The teams were seeded, and assigned to four geographic regions, with seeds 1–16 in each region. In Round 1, seeds 1 and 16 faced each other, as well as seeds 2 and 15, seeds 3 and 14, seeds 4 and 13, seeds 5 and 12, seeds 6 and 11, seeds 7 and 10, and seeds 8 and 9. In the first two rounds, the top four seeds were given the opportunity to host the first round game. In all cases, the higher seed accepted the opportunity.

The following table lists the region, host school, venue and the sixteen first and second round locations:

Region	Rnd	Host	Venue	City	State
East	1&2	Old Dominion University	Old Dominion University Fieldhouse	Norfolk	Virginia
East	1&2	North Carolina State University	Reynolds Coliseum	Raleigh	North Carolina
East	1&2	University of Connecticut	Harry A. Gampel Pavilion	Storrs	Connecticut
East	1&2	University of Arizona	McKale Center	Tucson	Arizona
Mideast	1&2	University of North Carolina	Carmichael Auditorium	Chapel Hill	North Carolina
Mideast	1&2	University of Tennessee	Thompson-Boling Arena	Knoxville	Tennessee
Mideast	1&2	University of Illinois	Assembly Hall (Champaign)	Champaign	Illinois
Mideast	1&2	Iowa State University	Hilton Coliseum	Ames	Iowa
Midwest	1&2	Louisiana Tech University	Thomas Assembly Center	Ruston	Louisiana
Midwest	1&2	Purdue University	Mackey Arena	West Lafayette	Indiana
Midwest	1&2	University of Alabama	Coleman Coliseum	Tuscaloosa	Alabama
Midwest	1&2	Texas Tech University	Lubbock Municipal Coliseum	Lubbock	Texas
West	1&2	University of Iowa	Carver–Hawkeye Arena	Iowa City	Iowa
West	1&2	Stanford University	Maples Pavilion	Stanford	California
West	1&2	University of Florida	O'Connell Center	Gainesville	Florida
West	1&2	Duke University	Cameron Indoor Stadium	Durham	North Carolina

== Regionals and Final Four ==
1998 NCAA regionals and Final Four

The Regionals, named for the general location, were held from March 20 to March 23 at these sites:

- Mideast Regional Memorial Gymnasium (Vanderbilt University), Nashville, Tennessee (Host: Vanderbilt University)
- Midwest Regional Lubbock Municipal Coliseum, Lubbock, Texas (Host: Texas Tech University)
- East Regional University of Dayton Arena, Dayton, Ohio (Host: University of Dayton)
- West Regional Oracle Arena, Oakland, California (Host: University of California, Santa Barbara)

Each regional winner advanced to the Final Four held March 27 and March 29 in Kansas City, Missouri, at the Kemper Arena

== Bids by state ==
The sixty-four teams came from thirty-four states, plus Washington, D.C. Four states, California, Tennessee, Virginia and North Carolina each had the most teams with four bids. Sixteen states did not have any teams receiving bids.

NCAA Women's basketball Tournament invitations by state 1998

Bids	State	Teams
4	California	Santa Clara, Stanford, UC Santa Barb., UCLA
4	North Carolina	North Carolina, UNC Greensboro, Duke, North Carolina St.
4	Tennessee	Memphis, Middle Tenn., Tennessee, Vanderbilt
4	Virginia	Liberty, Old Dominion, Virginia Tech, Virginia
3	Florida	FIU, Florida, Miami
3	Iowa	Drake, Iowa, Iowa St.
3	Louisiana	Grambling, Louisiana Tech, Tulane
3	Massachusetts	Harvard, Holy Cross, Massachusetts
3	Texas	Stephen F. Austin, Texas Tech, SMU
3	Wisconsin	Green Bay, Marquette, Wisconsin
2	Connecticut	Connecticut, Fairfield
2	District of Columbia	Howard, George Washington
2	Indiana	Purdue, Notre Dame
2	Kentucky	Louisville, Western Ky.
2	Ohio	Kent St., Youngstown St.
1	Alabama	Alabama
1	Arizona	Arizona
1	Arkansas	Arkansas
1	Colorado	Colorado St.
1	Georgia	Georgia
1	Hawaii	Hawaii
1	Illinois	Illinois
1	Kansas	Kansas
1	Maine	Maine
1	Michigan	Michigan
1	Missouri	Missouri St.
1	Montana	Montana
1	Nebraska	Nebraska
1	New Jersey	Rutgers
1	New Mexico	New Mexico
1	Pennsylvania	St. Francis
1	Oregon	Oregon
1	South Carolina	Clemson
1	Utah	Utah
1	Washington	Washington

== Brackets ==
Data source

=== East Region - Dayton, OH ===
First round March 13
1	Old Dominion	92
16	Saint Francis	39
Norfolk, VA
8	New Mexico	59
9	Nebraska	76
5	Memphis	80
12	Youngstown State	91
Raleigh, NC
4	NC State	89
13	Maine	64
6	Virginia	77
11	SMU	68
Tucson, AZ
3	Arizona	75
14	Santa Clara	63
7	Georgia	72
10	George Washington	74
Storrs, CT
2	Connecticut	93
15	Fairfield	52

Second round March 15
1	Old Dominion	75
9	Nebraska	60
12	Youngstown State	61
4	NC State	88
6	Virginia	77
3	Arizona	94
10	George Washington	67
2	Connecticut	75

Regional semifinals March 21
1	Old Dominion	54
4	NC State	55
3	Arizona	57
2	Connecticut	74

Regional finals March 23
4	NC State	60
2	Connecticut	52

=== Mideast Region - Nashville, TN ===
First round March 13 and 14
1	Tennessee	102
16	Liberty	58
Knoxville, TN – Sat/Mon
8	Western Kentucky	88
9	Stephen F. Austin	76
5	Rutgers	79
12	Oregon	76
Ames, IA – Sat/Mon
4	Iowa State	79
13	Kent State	76
6	Vanderbilt	71
11	UC Santa Barbara	76
Champaign, IL – Sat/Mon
3	Illinois	82
14	Green Bay	58
7	FIU	59
10	Marquette	45
Chapel Hill, NC – Fri/Sun
2	North Carolina	91
15	Howard	71

Second round March 15 and 16
1	Tennessee	82
8	Western Kentucky	62
5	Rutgers	62
4	Iowa State	61
11	UC Santa Barbara	65
3	Illinois	69
7	FIU	72
2	North Carolina	85

Regional semifinals March 21
1	Tennessee	92
5	Rutgers	60
3	Illinois	74
2	North Carolina	80

Regional finals March 23
1	Tennessee	76
2	North Carolina	70

=== Midwest Region - Lubbock, TX ===
First round March 13 and 14
1	Texas Tech	87
16	Grambling State	75
Lubbock, TX – Fri/Sun
8	SW Missouri State	64
9	Notre Dame	78
5	Drake	75
12	Colorado State	81
West Lafayette, IN – Sat/Mon
4	Purdue	88
13	Washington	71
6	Clemson	60
11	Miami (FL)	49
Ruston, LA – Sat/Mon
3	Louisiana Tech	86
14	Holy Cross	58
7	UCLA	65
10	Michigan	58
Tuscaloosa, AL – Fri/Sun
2	Alabama	94
15	UNC Greensboro	46

Second round March 15 and 16
1	Texas Tech	59
9	Notre Dame	74
12	Colorado State	63
4	Purdue	77
6	Clemson	52
3	Louisiana Tech	74
7	UCLA	74
2	Alabama	75

Regional semifinals March 21
9	Notre Dame	65
4	Purdue	70
3	Louisiana Tech	71
2	Alabama	57

Regional finals March 23
4	Purdue	65
3	Louisiana Tech	72

=== West Region - Oakland, CA ===
First round March 14
1	Stanford	67
16	Harvard	71
Stanford, CA
8	Hawaii	70
9	Arkansas	76
5	Kansas	72
12	Tulane	68
Iowa City, IA
4	Iowa	77
13	Massachusetts	59
6	Wisconsin	64
11	Virginia Tech	75
Gainesville, FL
3	Florida	85
14	Montana	64
7	Utah	61
10	Louisville	69
Durham, NC
2	Duke	92
15	Middle Tennessee	67

Second round March 16
16	Harvard	64
9	Arkansas	82
5	Kansas	62
4	Iowa	58
11	Virginia Tech	57
3	Florida	89
10	Louisville	53
2	Duke	69

Regional semifinals March 21
9	Arkansas	79
5	Kansas	63
3	Florida	58
2	Duke	71

Regional finals March 23
9	Arkansas	77
2	Duke	72

=== Final Four – Kansas City, Missouri ===
National semifinals March 27
E4	NC State	65
MW3	Louisiana Tech	84
ME1	Tennessee	86
W9	Arkansas	58

National championship March 29
MW3	Louisiana Tech	75
ME1	Tennessee	93

E-East; ME-Mideast; MW-Midwest; W-West.

== Record by conference ==
Sixteen conferences had more than one bid, or at least one win in NCAA Tournament play:

Conference	# of Bids	Record	Win %	Round of 32	Sweet Sixteen	Elite Eight	Final Four	Championship Game
Southeastern	6	14–5	.737	4	4	2	2	1
Atlantic Coast	5	12–5	.706	5	3	3	1	–
Big Ten	5	6–5	.545	3	2	1	–	–
Pacific-10	5	3–5	.375	2	1	–	–	–
Western Athletic	5	1–5	.167	1	–	–	–	–
Big East	4	7–4	.636	3	3	1	–	–
Big 12	4	5–4	.556	4	1	–	–	–
Conference USA	4	1–4	.200	1	–	–	–	–
Atlantic 10	3	2–3	.400	2	–	–	–	–
Sun Belt	2	6–2	.750	2	1	1	1	1
Missouri Valley	2	0–2	–	–	–	–	–	–
Colonial	1	2–1	.667	1	1	–	–	–
Big West	1	1–1	.500	1	–	–	–	–
Ivy	1	1–1	.500	1	–	–	–	–
Mid-Continent	1	1–1	.500	1	–	–	–	–
Trans America	1	1–1	.500	1	–	–	–	–

Fourteen conferences went 0–1: America East, Big Sky Conference, Big South Conference, Horizon League, MAAC, MAC, MEAC, Northeast Conference, Ohio Valley Conference, Patriot League, Southern Conference, Southland, SWAC, and West Coast Conference

== All-Tournament team ==
- Chamique Holdsclaw, Tennessee
- Tamika Catchings, Tennessee
- Kellie Jolly, Tennessee
- Tamicha Jackson, Louisiana Tech
- Chasity Melvin, North Carolina St.

== Game officials ==
- Art Bomengen (semifinal)
- Melissa Barlow (semifinal)
- Karen Wilhite (semifinal)
- Dennis Mayer (semifinal)
- Scott Yarbrough (semifinal)
- Teresa Dahlem (semifinal)
- Sally Bell (final)
- Bob Trammell (final)
- Wesley Dean (final)

== See also ==
- 1997–98 Tennessee Lady Volunteers basketball team
- 1998 Harvard vs. Stanford women's basketball game
- 1998 NCAA Division I men's basketball tournament
- 1998 NCAA Division II women's basketball tournament
- 1998 NCAA Division III women's basketball tournament
- 1998 NAIA Division I women's basketball tournament
- 1998 NAIA Division II women's basketball tournament
