= 1997–98 NCAA Division I women's basketball rankings =

- Season: 1997–98
- NCAA Tournament: 1998
- Preseason No. 1: Tennessee
- NCAA Tournament Champions: Tennessee
NCAA Division I women's basketball rankings


Two human polls comprise the 1997–98 NCAA Division I women's basketball rankings, the AP Poll and the Coaches Poll, in addition to various publications' preseason polls. The AP poll is currently a poll of sportswriters, while the USA Today Coaches' Poll is a poll of college coaches. The AP conducts polls weekly through the end of the regular season and conference play, while the Coaches poll conducts a final, post-NCAA tournament poll as well.

== Legend ==
–	No votes
(#)	Ranking

== AP Poll ==
Team	7-Nov	17-Nov	24-Nov	1-Dec	8-Dec	15-Dec	22-Dec	29-Dec	5-Jan	12-Jan	19-Jan	26-Jan	2-Feb	9-Feb	16-Feb	23-Feb	2-Mar	9-Mar
Tennessee	1	1	1	1	1	1	1	1	1	1	1	1	1	1	1	1	1	1
Louisiana Tech	2	2	4	4	4	4	4	4	4	4	4	4	4	4	4	4	4	4
Old Dominion	3	3	2	2	2	2	2	2	2	2	2	3	3	3	3	3	2	2
Stanford	4	4	11	14	18	12	17	15	14	11	13	9	6	6	5	5	5	5
North Carolina	5	5	9	7	6	5	5	5	8	7	T11	T6	5	5	7	10	7	7
UConn	6	6	3	3	3	3	3	3	3	3	3	2	2	2	2	2	3	3
Illinois	7	7	8	6	5	13	13	13	11	8	6	8	12	T9	9	13	17	16
Texas Tech	8	8	6	8	7	6	6	6	5	5	5	5	7	7	6	6	6	6
Florida	9	9	5	13	10	15	12	12	12	12	10	14	10	8	12	12	13	13
Vanderbilt	10	10	7	5	9	8	7	7	6	6	9	T6	11	15	14	14	19	18
Alabama	11	15	17	21	23	25	–	–	–	–	–	–	–	24	17	20	12	11
Iowa	12	11	20	–	–	–	–	–	–	–	–	–	–	–	–	25	24	23
Virginia	13	12	10	9	12	10	10	9	9	15	T11	16	13	12	15	15	18	17
Georgia	14	13	13	10	15	11	15	17	20	19	18	17	24	–	–	–	–	–
Arizona	15	14	12	11	8	7	11	10	10	9	7	10	8	T9	8	7	9	9
Western Ky.	16	16	22	17	14	18	20	19	19	18	16	15	18	18	18	17	15	15
Stephen F. Austin	17	17	19	23	25	–	–	–	–	–	25	22	19	22	22	21	20	19
Colorado	18	18	16	16	21	21	18	21	–	–	–	–	–	–	–	–	–	–
Duke	19	19	15	15	11	17	23	23	25	25	24	13	14	13	11	8	8	8
Auburn	20	20	18	18	16	23	21	20	18	T21	–	–	–	–	–	–	–	–
Tulane	21	22	21	22	20	19	–	–	24	–	–	–	–	–	–	–	–	–
George Washington	22	23	–	–	–	–	–	–	–	–	–	–	–	–	–	–	–	–
Texas	23	25	–	–	–	–	–	–	–	–	–	–	–	–	–	–	–	–
Kansas	24	24	–	–	–	–	–	–	–	–	–	–	–	–	–	–	–	–
Arkansas	–	–	24	20	24	24	25	25	–	–	–	–	–	–	–	–	–	–
Clemson	–	–	–	–	–	–	–	–	–	23	19	21	22	21	19	16	14	14
Drake	–	–	–	–	–	–	–	–	–	–	–	–	–	–	–	–	–	22
FIU	–	–	–	–	–	–	24	22	21	T21	22	19	15	14	13	11	11	12
Hawaii	–	–	–	–	–	–	–	–	–	–	–	23	20	16	16	19	16	20
Iowa St.	–	–	–	–	–	–	–	–	–	–	–	24	–	23	24	22	22	24
Nebraska	–	21	14	12	13	16	14	14	16	20	21	–	25	–	–	–	25	–
North Carolina St.	–	–	–	25	22	20	19	18	17	10	8	12	9	11	10	9	10	10
Purdue	–	–	25	–	–	–	22	24	23	24	23	–	–	–	–	–	–	21
Southwest Mo. St.	–	–	–	–	–	22	16	16	13	16	20	25	23	25	25	–	–	–
UCLA	–	–	–	–	–	–	–	–	–	–	–	–	–	–	–	–	23	25
Utah	–	–	–	–	–	–	–	–	22	17	14	11	17	20	20	18	21	–
Washington	–	–	–	24	19	14	9	8	7	13	15	18	21	17	21	23	–	–
LSU	T25	–	–	–	–	–	–	–	–	–	–	–	–	–	–	–	–	–
Wisconsin	T25	–	23	19	17	9	8	11	15	14	17	20	16	19	23	24	–	–

== USA Today Coaches poll ==
Team	PS	25-Nov	2-Dec	9-Dec	16-Dec	23-Dec	30-Dec	6-Jan	13-Jan	20-Jan	27-Jan	3-Feb	10-Feb	17-Feb	24-Feb	3-Mar	10-Mar
Tennessee	1	1	1	1	1	1	1	1	1	1	1	1	1	1	1	1	1
Old Dominion	4	4	4	2	2	2	2	2	2	3	3	3	3	3	3	2	2
UConn	6	2	2	3	3	3	3	3	3	2	2	2	2	2	2	3	3
Louisiana Tech	2	3	3	4	4	4	4	4	4	4	4	4	4	4	4	4	4
Texas Tech	9	6	9	7	6	6	6	6	6	5	5	7	6	5	5	5	5
Stanford	3	10	14	18	13	17	16	15	14	14	12	8	7	6	6	6	6
North Carolina	5	9	7	6	5	5	5	7	7	11	7	5	5	7	9	7	7
Arizona	15	13	12	9	7	9	8	10	10	9	11	9	11	10	8	8	8
Duke	19	16	17	14	18	22	22	23	20	23	15	16	14	13	10	9	9
North Carolina St.	–	–	23	20	14	14	14	13	9	7	T9	6	8	8	7	10	10
Alabama	10	14	20	22	23	–	–	–	–	–	–	–	23	18	19	11	11
Florida	8	5	13	11	16	15	15	14	15	12	14	12	9	12	12	13	12
FIU	–	–	–	25	25	23	21	21	22	20	20	17	15	16	14	12	13
Clemson	–	–	–	–	–	–	–	–	23	22	22	21	21	19	17	14	14
Illinois	7	8	6	5	11	11	13	11	8	6	8	11	10	9	11	15	15
Vanderbilt	11	7	5	8	8	7	7	5	5	8	6	10	13	11	13	16	16
Virginia	13	12	10	17	12	10	9	9	12	10	13	13	12	14	15	18	17
Western Ky.	17	19	15	12	15	18	19	19	18	17	16	19	20	20	20	19	18
Hawaii	–	–	–	–	–	–	–	–	–	25	21	18	16	15	18	17	19
Stephen F. Austin	18	22	25	–	–	–	–	–	–	–	25	23	25	24	23	21	20
Utah	–	–	–	–	–	–	25	22	16	13	T9	14	18	17	16	20	21
Purdue	–	24	–	–	–	25	–	25	25	24	–	–	–	–	–	25	22
Iowa St.	–	–	–	–	–	–	–	–	–	–	–	–	22	25	24	24	23
Wisconsin	–	23	19	15	10	8	10	12	11	15	18	15	19	22	21	23	24
Nebraska	–	15	11	13	17	16	17	16	21	19	23	22	24	23	22	22	25
Arkansas	–	25	21	24	–	–	–	–	–	–	–	–	–	–	–	–	–
Auburn	20	20	18	16	21	21	20	20	24	–	–	–	–	–	–	–	–
Colorado	16	17	16	21	22	20	23	–	–	–	–	–	–	–	–	–	–
George Washington	21	–	–	–	–	–	–	–	–	–	–	–	–	–	–	–	–
Georgia	14	11	8	10	9	12	12	18	19	18	17	24	–	–	–	–	–
Iowa	12	18	24	–	–	–	–	–	–	–	–	–	–	–	–	–	–
Kansas	23	–	–	–	–	–	–	–	–	–	–	–	–	–	–	–	–
LSU	25	–	–	–	–	–	–	–	–	–	–	–	–	–	–	–	–
Missouri St.	–	–	–	–	24	19	18	17	17	21	24	25	–	–	–	–	–
Texas	24	–	–	–	–	–	–	–	–	–	–	–	–	–	–	–	–
Tulane	22	21	22	19	19	24	24	24	–	–	–	–	–	–	–	–	–
Washington	–	–	–	23	20	13	11	8	13	16	19	20	17	21	25	–	–
