= Silsbee, Texas =

- Town
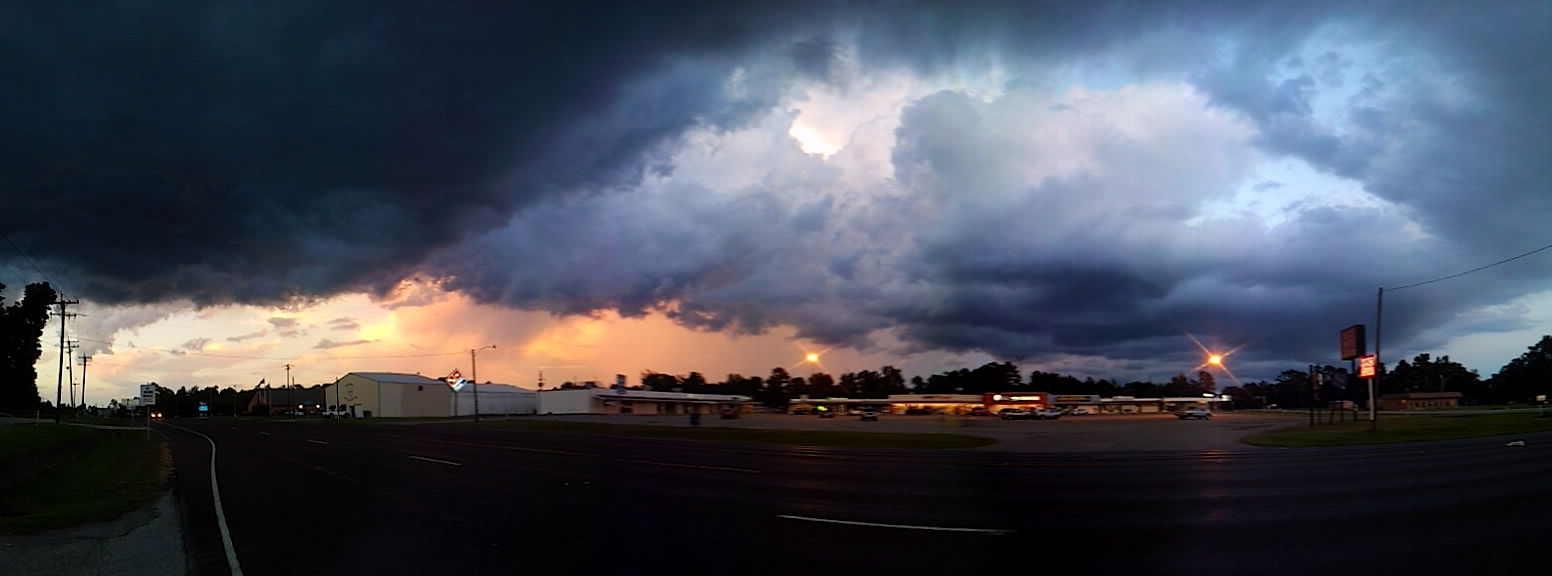
- Panoramic view of Silsbee at night

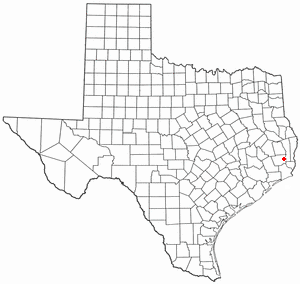
- Location of Silsbee, Texas

- Location within Texas Location within the United States Location within North America
- Coordinates: 30°20′44″N 94°10′35″W
- Country: United States
- State: Texas
- County: Hardin

Area
  - Total: 7.73 sq mi (20.02 km^{2})
  - Land: 7.68 sq mi (19.90 km^{2})
  - Water: 0.046 sq mi (0.12 km^{2})
- Elevation: 79 ft (24 m)

Population (2020)
  - Total: 6,935
  - Density: 861.3/sq mi (332.54/km^{2})
- Time zone: UTC-6 (Central (CST))
  - Summer (DST): UTC-5 (CDT)
- ZIP code: 77656
- Area code: 409
- FIPS code: 48-67832
- GNIS feature ID: 2411901
- Website: cityofsilsbee.com

Silsbee is a town in Hardin County, Texas, United States. Its population was 6,935 at the 2020 census. It is 21 miles (34 km) north of Beaumont and part of the Beaumont–Port Arthur metropolitan area.

== Geography ==
Silsbee is located in eastern Hardin County. U.S. Route 96, a four-lane bypass, forms the southeastern border of the city; the highway leads northeast 50 miles (80 km) to Jasper and south 21 miles (34 km) to Beaumont. Houston is 104 miles (167 km) southwest of Silsbee via Beaumont. Texas State Highway 327 runs through downtown Silsbee south of the city center, leading east to US 96 and west 9 miles (14 km) to Kountze, the Hardin County seat.

According to the United States Census Bureau, Silsbee has a total area of 7.7 square miles (20.0 km^{2}), of which 0.04 square miles (0.1 km^{2}), or 0.64%, is covered by water.

== Historical development ==
The site of Silsbee was reached by the Gulf, Beaumont, and Kansas City Railway in 1894 and a logging camp and then a sawmill were established thereafter. The community that grew up around the timber site was first called "Mill Town". The town was renamed in recognition of Nathaniel Devereux Silsbee, an investor (and grandson of Sen. Nathaniel Silsbee) from Boston, Massachusetts, who helped provide funds for the railway. The railroad was a project of John Henry Kirby, who established the Kirby Lumber Company in the city. This business was the main employer and strength of the Silsbee economy from the city's beginning.

== Demographics ==
Historical population
Census	Pop.	Note	%±
1940	2,525		—
1950	3,179		25.9%
1960	6,277		97.5%
1970	7,271		15.8%
1980	7,684		5.7%
1990	6,368		−17.1%
2000	6,393		0.4%
2010	6,611		3.4%
2020	6,935		4.9%
U.S. Decennial Census

Silsbee racial composition as of 2020 (NH = Non-Hispanic) (Note: Note: the US Census treats Hispanic/Latino as an ethnic category. This table excludes Latinos from the racial categories and assigns them to a separate category. Hispanics/Latinos can be of any race.)
Race	Number	Percentage
White (NH)	4,504	64.95%
Black or African American (NH)	1,782	25.07%
Native American or Alaska Native (NH)	10	0.14%
Asian (NH)	47	0.68%
Some other race (NH)	9	0.13%
Mixed/Multiracial (NH)	231	3.33%
Hispanic or Latino	352	5.08%
Total	6,935	

As of the 2020 United States census, 6,935 people, 2,441 households, and 1,745 families were residing in the city.

As of the 2010 census, 6,611 people, 2,520 households, and 1,763 families resided in the city. The population density was 881.5 inhabitants per square mile (340.3/km^{2}). The 2,790 housing units averaged 353.5 per square mile (136.5/km^{2}). The racial makeup of the city was 65.8% White, 30.3% African American, 0.4% Native American, 0.6% Asian, 0.015% Pacific Islander, 1.4% from other races, and 01.5% from two or more races. Hispanics or Latinos of any race were 4.0% of the population.

Of the 2,520 households, 30.8% had children under 18 living with them, 47.1% were married couples living together, 18.4% had a female householder with no husband present, and 30.0% were not families; 10.5% of all households were made up of individuals, and 12.0% had someone living alone who was 65 or older. The average household size was 2.52 and the average family size was 3.04.

In the city, the age distribution was 25.7% under 18, 8.2% from 19 to 24, 23.1% from 25 to 44, 25.6% from 45 to 64, and 17.4% who were 65 or older. The median age was 34.7 years. Of the entire population, 45.9% were male and 54.1% were female. Of those individuals 18 and over, 32.5% were male and 67.5% were female.

The median income for a household in the city was $49,121 and for a family was $51,518. About 16.6% of the population was below the poverty line; 14.0% of families were below the poverty line, while only 3.9% of married families were in poverty. Of those 65 or over, 4.4% were below the poverty line.

== Education ==
The town is served by the Silsbee Independent School District, with a total of four schools—Laura Reeves Elementary (prekindergarten and kindergarten), Silsbee Elementary (grades 1–5), Edwards-Johnson Memorial Silsbee Middle School (grages 6–8), and Silsbee High School (grades 9–12).

== Notable people ==
- Kalon Barnes, football player
- Curtis Buckley, football player
- Jefferson Fisher, lawyer and podcast host
- Len Garrett, football player
- Mark Henry, actor, Olympic weightlifter, wrestler
- James Hunter, football player
- Chloe Jones, pornographic actress
- Brandi McCain, basketball player
- Hannah Read, indie rock musician who performs under the stage name Lomelda
- LaQuan Stallworth, basketball player
- Michael Tuck, television newscaster in San Diego
