= Itoro Coleman =

American basketball player and coach (born 1977)

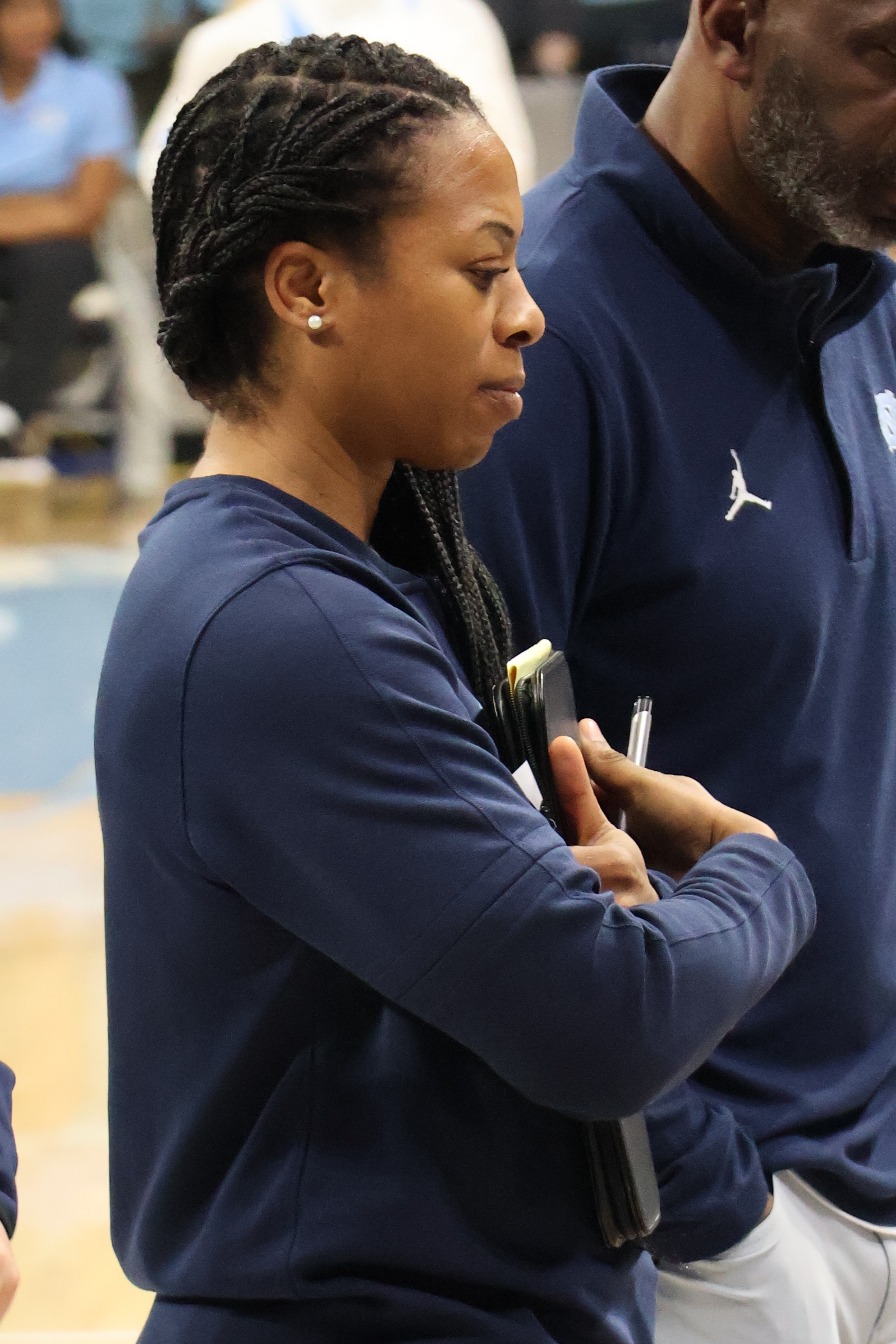
- Coleman coaching North Carolina in 2024

Personal information
- Born: February 21, 1977 (age 49) Washington, D.C., U.S.
- Listed height: 5 ft 7 in (1.70 m)
- Listed weight: 140 lb (64 kg)

Career information
- High school: Hephzibah (Hephzibah, Georgia)
- College: Clemson (1995–1999)
- WNBA draft: 1999: undrafted
- Playing career: 2003–2003
- Position: Guard

Career history

Playing
- 2003: Houston Comets

Coaching
- 1999–2000: Liberty (asst.)
- 2000–2002: Butler (asst.)
- 2002–2007: Penn State (asst.)
- 2007–2010: Clemson (asst.)
- 2010–2013: Clemson
- 2014–2019: Penn State (asst.)
- 2020–2021: Marquette (asst.)
- 2021–2024: North Carolina (asst.)
- 2024–present: Virginia Tech (associate HC)

Career highlights
- ACC Tournament MVP (1999); First-team All-ACC (1999)
- Stats at Basketball Reference
Medals
Women's basketball
Representing the United States
Pan American Games
Bronze medal – third place	1999 Winnipeg	Team

Itoro Coleman (born Itoro Umoh on February 21, 1977) is an American basketball coach and former player. Currently she is the associate head coach at Virginia Tech, Coleman played collegiately for the Clemson Tigers and later served as head women's coach for her alma mater. In 2002, she was selected for the Atlantic Coast Conference 50-year all-star women's basketball team, as well as the 25th Anniversary Tournament team.

== Early life ==
Born in Washington, D.C., Umoh grew up in Hephzibah, Georgia. She attended Hephzibah High School and played for the Lady Rebels under coach Wendell Lofton. She graduated in 1995.

== Playing career ==
During her sports playing career at Clemson University from 1995 to 1999, Umoh led the Lady Clemson Tigers to two ACC championships. While at Clemson, she played both point guard and shooting guard. During her 1995-1996 freshman year at Clemson, in which the university won the ACC Championship, Umoh led the team in assists and steals. At Clemson, she was a three-time All-ACC player.

She scored her 900th career point in 1998 during a Clemson-Wake Forest game in which coach Jim Davis won his 100th game.

During her 1999 senior ACC tournament, Umoh was awarded the MVP award in a rare unanimous vote. That same year, she was an honorable mention for the All-American team and Defensive All-American.

Coleman represented the United States during the 1999 Pan American Games, with the team winning a bronze medal.

She graduated with a degree in communications from Clemson in 2000.

She appeared in the 2002 romantic comedy film Juwanna Mann.

=== WNBA career ===
In 1999 Umoh was in the preseason camps of the Minnesota Lynx and Washington Mystics but did not make either team. In 2002, after attending WNBA league camp tryouts, she was assigned to the Indiana Fever training camp, but failed to make the team.

In 2003, Coleman became the first Clemson player to be named to an active WNBA roster after being signed by the Houston Comets early in the season to replace the injured Cynthia Cooper (she had previously been in the Comets training camp that year but was waived before the regular season started). She played in three games for the team before being waived again.

=== Nigerian national team ===
At the 2004 Summer Olympics in Athens, Coleman played for the Nigeria women's national basketball team. She played on the team with Joanne Aluka, a fellow Hephzibah High School alumna. Coleman also played for the Nigerian national team at the 2006 FIBA World Championship for Women. She had the highest number of assists in the tournament.

== Coaching ==
Coleman's first coaching job was as a student assistant for Liberty University in 1999. After graduation from college, she worked at Butler University, where she coached from 2000 to 2002. She accepted an assistant coaching job for the Lady Clemson Tigers in 2002. One of her major functions in the program was as a recruiter. She became the head coach of the team in 2010. After three years as head coach, she was fired by Clemson at the end of the 2013 season.

She was an assistant coach for Courtney Banghart at the University of North Carolina until April 12, 2024, when she was named the associate head coach at Virginia Tech.

== Career statistics ==
=== WNBA ===
==== Regular season ====
Year	Team	GP	GS	MPG	FG%	3P%	FT%	RPG	APG	SPG	BPG	TO	PPG
2003	Houston	3	0	2.0	0.0	0.0	0.0	0.0	0.3	0.0	0.0	0.3	0.0
Career	1 year, 1 team	3	0	2.0	0.0	0.0	0.0	0.0	0.3	0.0	0.0	0.3	0.0

=== College ===
Year	Team	GP	GS	MPG	FG%	3P%	FT%	RPG	APG	SPG	BPG	TO	PPG
1995–96	Clemson	31	-	-	44.4	28.1	66.7	2.2	2.1	1.9	0.2	-	7.2
1996–97	Clemson	30	-	-	43.4	22.0	72.6	5.1	2.5	2.3	0.3	-	13.0
1997–98	Clemson	33	-	-	38.5	28.6	76.3	4.6	4.1	2.2	0.1	-	12.0
1998–99	Clemson	32	-	-	38.7	26.8	74.0	5.3	5.7	2.0	0.2	-	12.5
Career		126	-	-	40.8	26.4	73.2	4.3	3.6	2.1	0.2	-	11.2
Statistics retrieved from Sports-Reference.

== Personal life ==
In December 1999, Umoh married Harold Coleman. Together, they have four children, three girls and a boy. They became the primary caregivers for her two younger siblings after the death of Itoro's mother in 2002. They also care for Harold Coleman's nephew.
