= Rex Kurzius =

American serial entrepreneur

- Education: Southern Methodist University (BBA)
- Occupations: Entrepreneur; business executive; investor
- Years active: 1993–present
- Known for: Founder of Asset Panda
- Title: Founder and CEO, Asset Panda
- Relatives: Dan Kurzius (brother)

Rex Kurzius is an American serial entrepreneur, investor, and business executive based in the Dallas–Fort Worth metroplex.

He is the founder and CEO of Asset Panda, a cloud-based SaaS platform and mobile app used globally for tracking, managing, and auditing fixed assets and equipment.

Kurzius started his first startup venture at the age of 23, and since then, he has started and sold several companies, notably Timberhorn IT Solutions, an IT staffing firm acquired by Ettain Group, and Resulte Universal, a Dallas-based professional services and staffing firm founded in 1997 that specialized in technology, accounting, and finance staff augmentation, acquired by Spherion. His companies have repeatedly landed on the Inc.500 list of fastest-growing private companies in America, alongside recognitions from the Deloitte Technology Fast 500 and Dallas 100.

He was named the 2018 Entrepreneur of the Year by the Chamber of Commerce in Frisco, Texas. Kurzius is also the former President of the Dallas Chapter of Entrepreneurs Organization and former Chairman of the North Texas Young Presidents Organization.

He holds a business degree from Southern Methodist University (SMU). Kurzius's older brother Dan Kurzius, is the co-founder of Mailchimp.
