= Ian Bell (CEO) =

American media executive (born 1976)

- Born: October 12, 1976 (age 49)
- Education: University of Oregon
- Occupation: CEO of Designtechnica Corp.
- Known for: Digital Trends, The Manual
- Board member of: The Outdoor Project

Ian Bell (born October 12, 1976) is co-founder of technology news and reviews site Digital Trends and men's lifestyle site The Manual, both owned by the privately held Designtechnica, where he is CEO. In 2017, he was a finalist in EY's Entrepreneur of the Year award in the Pacific Northwest. Before founding Digital Trends, Bell held positions at Intel, Lockheed Martin, and The Ostler Group, a strategic marketing firm.

== Career ==
=== Digital Trends ===
Bell co-founded Digital Trends in 2006 with Dan Gaul, who is CTO. The pair started the site above a small furniture store in Lake Oswego, Oregon. Their goal was "to share with the world their love for home theater, cars, and all things tech -- but from their unique viewpoint that technology should be fun, easy to use, and designed well." In May 2009, Digital Trends moved its headquarters from Lake Oswego into the US Bancorp Tower in Downtown Portland, Oregon. The company opened a second office in New York City in 2012, and in 2014, Bell launched Digital Trends en Español, a Spanish-language version of the technology site led by editor-in-chief Juan Garcia.

Bell has remained focused on maintaining a profitable business, even as the sites he co-founded have grown. "Being profitable has always been at the forefront of what we want to do," he told media and marketing news site Digiday in 2016. "You have to be a little more strategic; if you fail, you fail much quicker." In late summer of that year, Re/Code reported on a deal with Conde Nast to acquire Digital Trends for $120 million, noting that the site was expected to generate $30 million in revenue for the year and around $6 million in profit. Bell denied that his company was in talks but acknowledged that he "is periodically approached by would-be buyers." Digiday also wrote about the deal, comparing the site's traffic to "such properties as the Purch network, CNET, and The Verge, and ahead of USA Today Tech, Yahoo Tech, and Business Insider's Tech Insider."

== The Manual ==
Bell and Gaul co-founded the men's lifestyle site The Manual in 2012. According to the site, "The Manual is simple — we show men how to live a more engaged life. Whether it be fashion, food, drink, travel, grooming, or culture, we're here to provide insight into it all." The Manual is run by editor-in-chief Cator Sparks.

== Awards ==
- 2017 - Bell was named a finalist for EY's Entrepreneur of the Year award. 2016 winners include J.W. Bill Marriott, Ben Chestnut, founder of MailChimp, and Fitbit founder James Park.
- 2015 - Bell was named to the Portland Business Journal's 40 under 40.
- 2004–2011 – Bell received the Microsoft MVP award for Digital Media.
