= Darrell Baker Jr. =

American football player (born 1998)

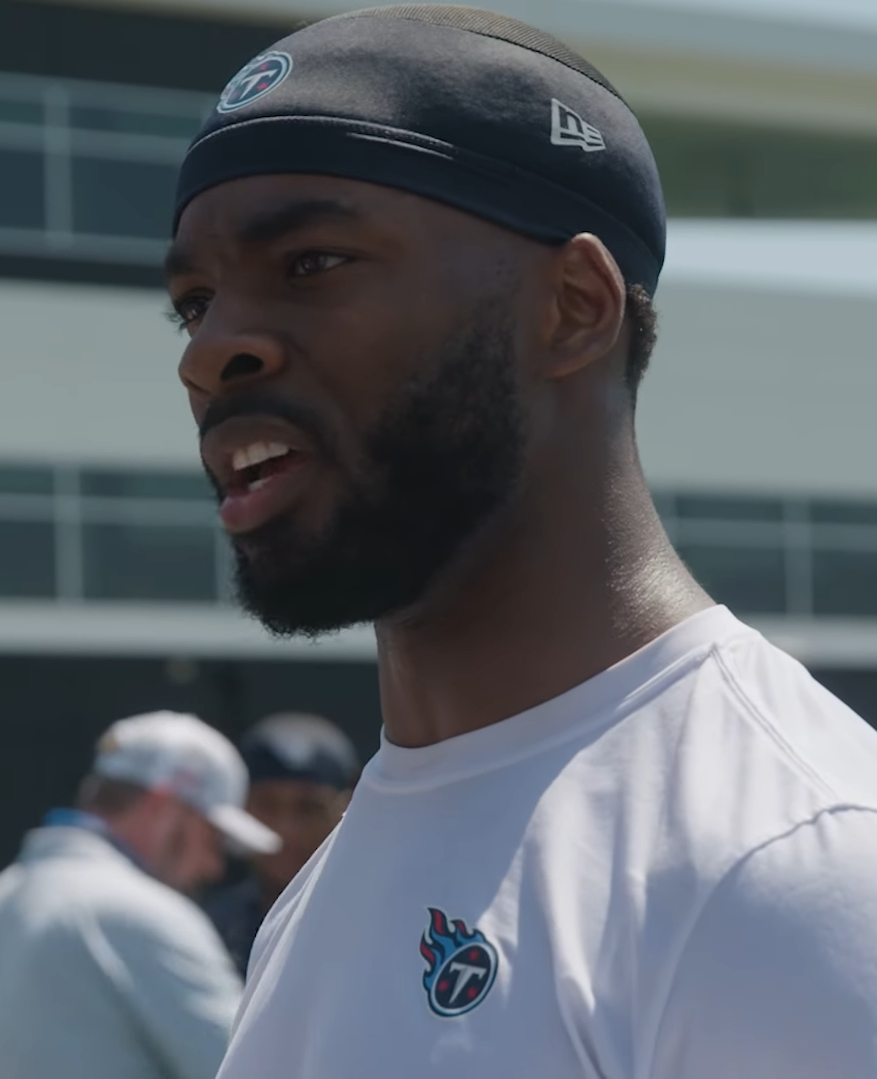
- Baker Jr. with the Tennessee Titans in 2025

No. 22 – Miami Dolphins
- Position: Cornerback
- Roster status: Active

Personal information
- Born: March 27, 1998 (age 28); Panama City, Panama
- Listed height: 6 ft 1 in (1.85 m)
- Listed weight: 197 lb (89 kg)

Career information
- High school: Hephzibah (Hephzibah, Georgia, U.S.)
- College: Georgia Southern (2016–2021)
- NFL draft: 2022: undrafted

Career history
- Arizona Cardinals (2022)*; Indianapolis Colts (2022–2023); Tennessee Titans (2024–2025); Miami Dolphins (2026–present)
- * Offseason or practice squad member only

Career NFL statistics as of 2025
- Total tackles: 130
- Pass deflections: 19
- Fumble recoveries: 1
- Stats at Pro Football Reference

Darrell Megail Baker Jr. (born March 27, 1998) is a Panamanian-American professional football cornerback for the Miami Dolphins of the National Football League (NFL). Born in Panama City, he grew up in Hephzibah, Georgia, and played college football for the Georgia Southern Eagles. He was signed by the Arizona Cardinals as an undrafted free agent in 2022.

== Early life ==
Baker was born on March 27, 1998, in Panama City, to two United States Army veterans. He was raised in Hephzibah, Georgia, and attended Hephzibah High School, where he participated in football and track and field, playing as a cornerback and wide receiver in the former. As a junior in football, he made several key plays in their regular season finale to help them reach the state playoffs, being named The Augusta Chronicle player of the week. As a senior in track, Baker won the state championship in the long jump and was named "Boys' track athlete of the year" by the Chronicle.

Baker began attending Georgia Southern University in 2016, and was a walk-on member of their football team. He spent his true freshman season as a redshirt. In 2017, his second year with the program, he played in 12 games, appearing on 377 snaps, and recorded 18 tackles and one interception along with a forced fumble. The following season, Baker appeared in nine matches and recorded six tackles and one interception, while appearing on 231 plays.

As a junior in 2019, Baker played in all 12 games and started three, recording two pass breakups as well as 23 tackles, while seeing action on a total of 280 snaps. He saw his first action as a full-time starter in 2020, starting all 12 games and posting 34 tackles, seven pass breakups and an interception. Baker was named third-team all-conference at the end of the season by Pro Football Focus (PFF).

After receiving an extra year of eligibility due to the COVID-19 pandemic, Baker opted to return to Georgia Southern for a sixth season in 2021. He started eight games and appeared in a total of 10, and tallied while playing 499 snaps 32 tackles, eight pass breakups and a forced fumble. He finished his college career with 111 tackles, three interceptions, two forced fumbles and 18 pass breakups.

== Professional career ==
Pre-draft measurables
Height	Weight	Arm length	Hand span	Wingspan	40-yard dash	10-yard split	20-yard split	20-yard shuttle	Three-cone drill	Vertical jump	Broad jump	Bench press
6 ft 0 7/8 in (1.85 m)	190 lb (86 kg)	32 in (0.81 m)	8 3/4 in (0.22 m)	6 ft 5 7/8 in (1.98 m)	4.43 s	1.53 s	2.50 s	4.25 s	7.07 s	41.5 in (1.05 m)	11 ft 4 in (3.45 m)	11 reps
All values from Pro Day

=== Arizona Cardinals ===
After going unselected in the 2022 NFL draft, Baker was signed by the Arizona Cardinals as an undrafted free agent. He was waived on August 29, during the roster cuts period. After being waived by Arizona, Baker had tryouts with the Green Bay Packers and Indianapolis Colts.

=== Indianapolis Colts ===
Baker was signed to the Colts' practice squad on September 13, 2022. He was elevated to the active roster for their Week 15 game against the Minnesota Vikings, and made his NFL debut in the 39–36 loss, appearing on 14 special teams snaps. He was signed to the active roster on December 28. Baker recovered a fumble in the Colts' Week 18 game against the Houston Texans.

Baker made the Colts final roster in 2023, playing in 14 games with six starts and finished second on the team in pass breakups.

On January 8, 2024, Baker signed a one-year contract extension with the Colts. On August 28, 2024, Baker was waived by the Colts.

=== Tennessee Titans ===
On August 29, 2024, Baker was claimed off waivers by the Tennessee Titans. He played all 17 games during the 2024 season, including nine starts. He finished with 40 tackles and five pass deflections.

On March 11, 2025, Baker signed a one-year contract extension with the Titans.

=== Miami Dolphins ===
On March 12, 2026, Baker signed a one-year contract with the Miami Dolphins.

== NFL career statistics ==
Legend
**Bold**	Career high

=== Regular season ===
Year	Team	Games		Tackles					Interceptions						Fumbles				
Year	Team	GP	GS	Cmb	Solo	Ast	Sck	TFL	Int	Yds	Avg	Lng	TD	PD	FF	Fmb	FR	Yds	TD
2022	IND	3	0	0	0	0	0.0	0	0	0	0.0	0	0	0	0	0	**1**	**7**	0
2023	IND	14	6	35	28	7	0.0	0	0	0	0.0	0	0	**7**	0	0	0	0	0
2024	TEN	17	9	40	32	8	0.0	**1**	0	0	0.0	0	0	5	0	0	0	0	0
2025	TEN	17	10	**55**	**39**	**16**	0.0	0	0	0	0.0	0	0	**7**	0	0	0	0	0
Career		51	25	130	99	31	0.0	1	0	0	0.0	0	0	19	0	0	1	7	0
