= Cross Creek High School =

Public high school in Hephzibah, Georgia, United States

Location
- 3855 Old Waynesboro Rd. Hephzibah, Georgia; United States; 33°21′22″N 82°00′05″W

Information
- Type: Public
- Established: 1999
- School board: Richmond County Board of Education
- School district: Richmond County School System
- Superintendent: Dr. Malinda Cobb
- Principal: Dr. David Yancey
- Staff: 89.20 (FTE)
- Enrollment: 1,124 (2023-2024)
- Student to teacher ratio: 12.60
- Colors: Crimson and gold
- Mascot: Razorback
- Website: Cross Creek High School

Cross Creek High School (CCHS) is a public high school located in the South Augusta area of Augusta, Georgia, United States. The school is located within the Richmond County School System.

== History ==
Cross Creek High School was opened in 1999, for convenience and to relieve overcrowding at nearby Hephzibah High School and Butler High School.

Cross Creek is one of the highest ranking schools in Georgia.

== Demographics ==
Demographics	Percent
White	40%
Black	60%
Asian	1%
Hispanic	2%
Unknown	3%

== Student activities ==
=== Athletics ===
The school has a variety of team sports and programs. Including football, soccer, softball, baseball, tennis, track, basketball, golf, volleyball, wrestling, cross country, and cheerleading.

=== Fine Arts ===
Cross Creek High School has an outstanding fine arts department and offers various arts related extracurriculars such as Marching Band, Majorette, Concert Band, Chorus, and Orchestra.

Their band and majorette dance line has received praise from all around the city of Augusta and throughout the state of Georgia. They have scored superior ratings multiple times at LGPE (Large Group Performance Evaluation) and have scored highly at various band battles.

Their band director, Mr. E. Fleming (2022- Present), has received awards such as Band Director of The Year Award (2024), RCSS Band of The Year Award (2024), and Teacher Of The Year Award (2026).
