= Cyfe =

Cyfe, Inc.
- Type: Private
- Industry: Business intelligence, Business Analysis, Software
- Founded: 2012
- Founder: Deven Patel
- Headquarters: Los Angeles, California
- Area served: Worldwide
- Key people: Ben Carpel(CEO)
- Services: Business analytics
- Website: www.cyfe.com

Cyfe, Inc. is a self-service cloud based business intelligence application software company based in Los Angeles, California. The company is known for its creation of the business dashboard app, designed to analyze, transform and report data from different integrated sources of business intelligence. It is a freemium application to track and monitor all business metrics in one single place. While its core markets are still located in United States, Cyfe has been expanding globally and now operates in 15 countries worldwide.

== History ==
Cyfe was founded in 2012, when Deven Patel, a serial entrepreneur and web software engineer, first attempted to look for simple applications that assembles current information from multiple sources into a single, consistent, and a coherent presentation format. Recognizing that many other individuals and organizations were facing similar issues with managing multiple social accounts, Patel realized that there was a potential market for an online business dashboard app, as small businesses and entrepreneurs spend most of their time in tracking and monitor their business data scattered across the web. Patel started developing an affordable mobile app with its team for small business that can connect to the social network, websites, blogs, email accounts, and others so that data can be recognized and displayed in a dashboard in the real time.

In 2012, Cyfe incorporated as a private company and launched it with a freemium pricing model. Within the same year, Cyfe introduced a Premium plan called Cyfe Premium for paid service tiers, including unlimited dashboards and widgets, historical data, exports and other premium options.

In 2013, the Cyfe dashboard was expanded to further support analytics, marketing, sales and infrastructure tools including Eventbrite, Aweber, GetResponse, Stripe, RSS Feeds and others.

In 2019, Alpine SG acquires Cyfe along with 5 other startups.

== Products ==
Cyfe Dashboard is an online dashboard platform for building real-time business dashboards. Cyfe provides a browser-based dashboard that allows business users to connect to many data services, automate data retrieval, analyze, and then transform and visualize the data for business intelligence. The product targeted non-technical end user by providing them a schema-less architecture to easily connect to data sources, and separates data from presentation and reuse data sources throughout the platform.

Cyfe Premium provides customized features and functions that can be used to edit built-in formula, to transform, integrate, and filter any data before visualizing in the front end dashboard. Users are able to access the dashboard from their desktop, tablet and mobile phone, and share it with others by granting access to the dashboard.

== Business model ==
Cyfe runs a freemium model and creates a dashboard for companies and organizations to join and analyze large data sets from multiple sources like Google Adwords, LinkedIn, Facebook, Mailchimp, Salesforce, Google Analytics, Google AdSense, Twitter, Shopify, Stripe, Zendesk, Flickr, Amazon web services, and other platforms.
