= Brandon Lynch =

American gridiron football player (born 1982)

Cleveland Browns
- Title: Defensive backs coach/pass game specialist

Personal information
- Born: January 31, 1982 (age 44); Augusta, Georgia, U.S.
- Listed height: 6 ft 0 in (1.83 m)
- Listed weight: 204 lb (93 kg)

Career information
- Position: Linebacker
- High school: Hephzibah (Hephzibah, Georgia)
- College: Middle Tennessee State
- NFL draft: 2004: undrafted

Career history

Playing
- Tennessee Titans (2004)*; Indianapolis Colts (2005–2006)*; Saskatchewan Roughriders (2007–2009)
- * Offseason or practice squad member only

Coaching
- Minnesota Vikings (2013) Bill Walsh minority intern; Northern Iowa (2013–2016); Secondary coach (2013-2014); Secondary/associate head coach for defense (2015-2016); East Carolina (2017-2019); Secondary coach (2017); Cornerbacks coach (2018-2019); Cleveland Browns (2020–present); Assistant defensive backs coach (2020-2022); Cornerbacks coach (2023–2025); Defensive backs coach/passing game specialist (2026–present)
- Stats at CFL.ca (archive)

Brandon Lynch (born January 31, 1982) is an American professional football coach and former linebacker. He is the Defensive backs coach/pass game specialist coach for the Cleveland Browns of the National Football League (NFL). Brandon played high school football at Hephzibah High School. He was originally signed by the Tennessee Titans as an undrafted free agent in 2004. He played college football at Middle Tennessee State. Lynch was also a member of the Indianapolis Colts and Saskatchewan Roughriders.

== Professional playing career ==
Lynch went undrafted in 2004 but he was signed by the Tennessee Titans as an undrafted free agent. He was signed and released to the Colts’ practice squad in 2005 and in 2006 when the Colts won the Super Bowl. In 2007, Lynch wanted to play so he began playing in the Canadian Football League. He played linebacker and safety for the Saskatchewan Roughriders for three seasons.
