= James Carpenter (offensive lineman) =

American football player (born 1989)

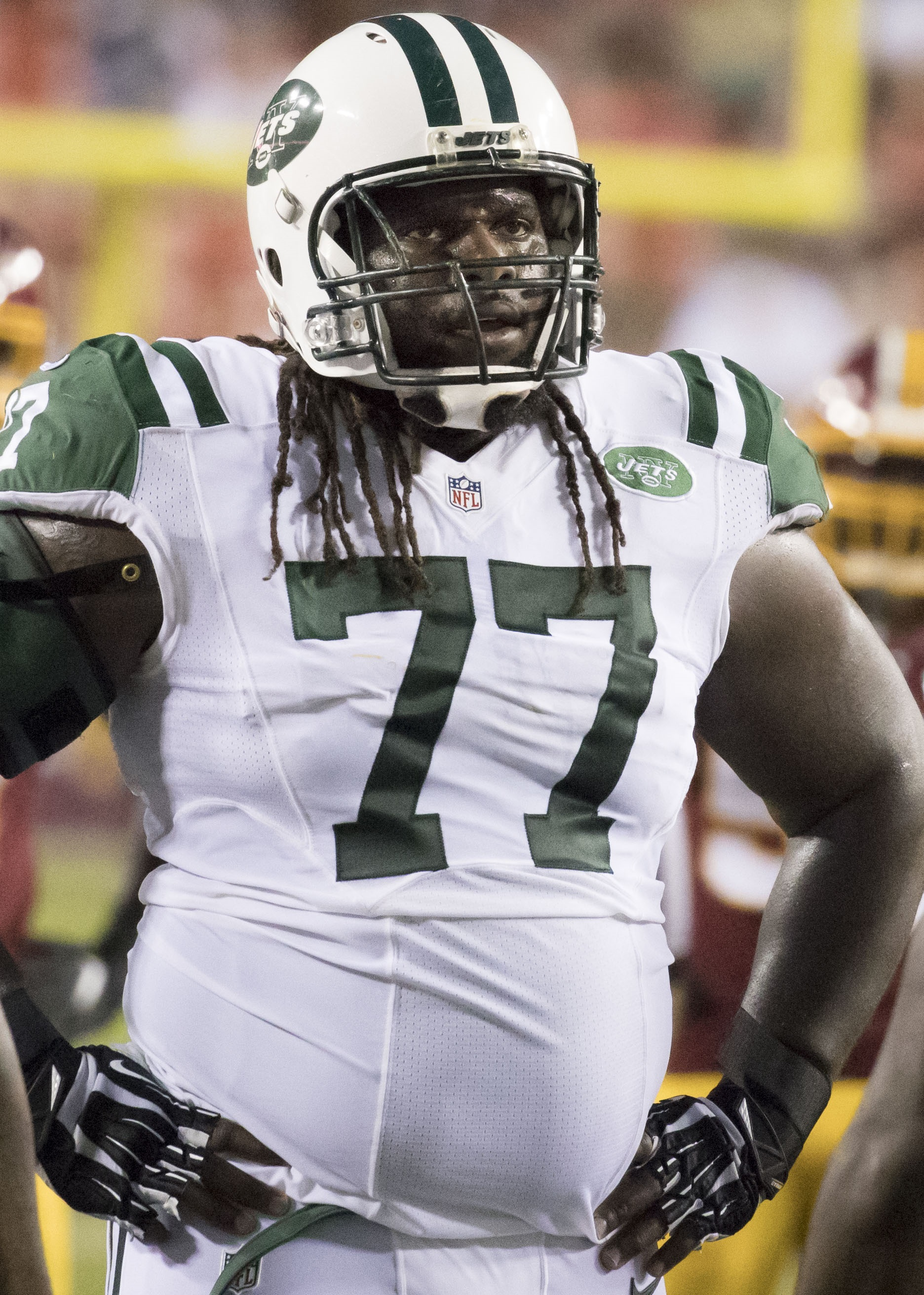
- Carpenter with the New York Jets in 2016

No. 75, 77
- Position: Guard

Personal information
- Born: March 22, 1989 (age 37); Augusta, Georgia, U.S.
- Listed height: 6 ft 5 in (1.96 m)
- Listed weight: 321 lb (146 kg)

Career information
- High school: Hephzibah (Hephzibah, Georgia)
- College: Coffeyville (2007–2008); Alabama (2009–2010)
- NFL draft: 2011: 1st round, 25th overall pick

Career history
- Seattle Seahawks (2011–2014); New York Jets (2015–2018); Atlanta Falcons (2019–2020); Baltimore Ravens (2021); New Orleans Saints (2021)

Awards and highlights
- Super Bowl champion (XLVIII); BCS national champion (2010); First-team All-SEC (2010); Second-team All-SEC (2009)

Career NFL statistics
- Games played: 132
- Games started: 122
- Stats at Pro Football Reference

James Edward Carpenter Jr. (born March 22, 1989) is an American former professional football player who was a guard in the National Football League (NFL). He was selected by the Seattle Seahawks as the 25th overall pick in the 2011 NFL draft. He played college football at Alabama.

== Early life ==
Carpenter attended Hephzibah High School in Hephzibah, Georgia, where he played offensive guard for the Hephzibah Rebels high school football team.

Considered a two-star recruit by Scout.com, Carpenter was listed as the No. 193 offensive guard in the nation in 2007.

Carpenter received only one offer, which was by Iowa State. He committed to the Cyclones on February 6, 2007, but he struggled academically and was placed at Coffeyville Community College by Iowa State.

== College career ==
=== Coffeyville Community College ===
In two seasons at Coffeyville Community College, Carpenter started every game at left tackle for the Red Ravens and earned All-Conference (KJCCC) honors twice. In 2008, he was named to the NJCAA All-American first-team.

Rated as a four-star recruit by Rivals.com, Carpenter was ranked as the No. 32 junior college prospect in 2009.

=== Alabama ===
Although he remained an Iowa State signee, he began visiting other schools "just [...] to make sure I make a good decision". He made official visits to Texas Tech, Oklahoma, and Ole Miss, before eventually committing to Alabama and head coach Nick Saban.

Carpenter faced the difficult task to replace All-American left tackle Andre Smith. While analysts did not expect him to dominate as a run blocker like Smith, they saw him as "a rock in pass protection".

Carpenter went on to start every game at left tackle for the Crimson Tide in 2009 and 2010. In the 2009 season, Carpenter was part of the undefeated Crimson Tide team that won the National Championship over the Texas Longhorns.

== Professional career ==
Pre-draft measurables
Height	Weight	Arm length	Hand span	Wingspan	40-yard dash	10-yard split	20-yard split	20-yard shuttle	Three-cone drill	Vertical jump	Broad jump	Bench press
6 ft 4 3/8 in (1.94 m)	321 lb (146 kg)	34 in (0.86 m)	9 3/4 in (0.25 m)	6 ft 8 5/8 in (2.05 m)	5.28 s	1.81 s	3.06 s	4.75 s	7.56 s	28.5 in (0.72 m)	8 ft 10 in (2.69 m)	23 reps
All values from NFL Combine/Pro Day

=== Seattle Seahawks ===
Carpenter had a good post-season performance and, according to Sports Illustrated, went "from a third-round choice to a player who could be a surprise pick late in round one". He was selected in the first round with the 25th overall pick in the 2011 NFL draft by the Seattle Seahawks. He was the fourth tackle to be selected that year. Carpenter started nine games in his rookie season before suffering a season ending ACL injury and being placed on the injured reserve.

Carpenter was limited to seven games in 2012 still recovering from an ACL injury from the previous year.

In the 2013 season, Carpenter appeared in 16 games with 10 starts. Carpenter earned a Super Bowl ring with the Seahawks in Super Bowl XLVIII where they defeated the Denver Broncos 43–8, giving Carpenter his first career championship title and the Seahawks their first Super Bowl win in franchise history.

In the offseason, Seattle declined the fifth-year option for Carpenter. In the 2014 season, Carpenter started all 13 games he appeared in and participated in the Seahawks making it to Super Bowl XLIX, where they lost to the New England Patriots by a score of 28–24.

=== New York Jets ===
On March 10, 2015, Carpenter signed a four-year contract with the New York Jets worth $19.1 million. He started in all 16 games for the Jets in the 2015 season.

At the start of the 2016 league year, Carpenter agreed to restructure his contract converting $3.96 million into bonuses creating $2.46 million in cap space. He started in all 16 games for the Jets in the 2016 season. In addition, he had a fumble recovery.

In the 2017 season, Carpenter started in all 16 games and had two fumble recoveries on the season.

In 2018, Carpenter started 10 games at left guard while dealing with a shoulder injury in Week 7. He aggravated the injury prior to Week 12 and was ultimately placed on injured reserve on November 28, 2018.

=== Atlanta Falcons ===
On March 13, 2019, Carpenter signed a four-year, $21 million contract with the Atlanta Falcons. He was named the Falcons starting left guard to begin the season. He started 11 games there before being placed on injured reserve on December 20, 2019, with a concussion. In the 2020 season, he appeared in and started 16 games.

The Falcons released Carpenter on March 9, 2021.

=== Baltimore Ravens ===
On October 19, 2021, Carpenter was signed to the Baltimore Ravens' practice squad. He was released by Baltimore on November 20.

=== New Orleans Saints ===
On December 8, 2021, Carpenter was signed to the New Orleans Saints' practice squad. He was promoted to the active roster on December 18. He appeared in five games and started one in the 2021 season.

=== NFL career statistics ===
Year	Team	GP	GS
2011	SEA	9	9
2012	SEA	7	7
2013	SEA	16	16
2014	SEA	13	13
2015	NYJ	16	16
2016	NYJ	16	16
2017	NYJ	16	16
2018	NYJ	10	10
2019	ATL	11	11
2020	ATL	13	13
2021	NO	5	1
Career		132	128
