= 1996–97 Clemson Tigers women's basketball team =

Women's college basketball season

1996–97 Clemson Tigers women's basketball

NCAA Tournament, First Round
- Conference: Atlantic Coast Conference

Ranking
- Coaches: No. 25
- AP: No. 21
- Record: 19–11 (8–8 ACC)
- Head coach: Jim Davis (10th season)
- Home arena: Littlejohn Coliseum

The 1996–97 Clemson Tigers women's basketball team represented Clemson University during the 1996–97 NCAA Division I women's basketball season. The Tigers were led by tenth year head coach Jim Davis. The Tigers, members of the Atlantic Coast Conference, played their home games at Littlejohn Coliseum.

== Schedule ==
Date time, TV	Rank^{#}	Opponent^{#}	Result	Record	Site city, state
November 24, 1996*	No. 25	VCU	W 55–46	1–0	Littlejohn Coliseum; Clemson, South Carolina
November 26, 1996*	No. 24	No. 2 Georgia	W 83–78	2–0	Littlejohn Coliseum; Clemson, South Carolina
December 3, 1996*	No. 20	Furman	W 93–49	3–0	Littlejohn Coliseum; Clemson, South Carolina
December 7, 1996	No. 20	at Maryland	L 53–72	3–1 (0–1)	Cole Field House; College Park, Maryland
December 15, 1996*	No. 22	Austin Peay	W 88–68	4–1 (0–1)	Littlejohn Coliseum; Clemson, South Carolina
December 18, 1996*	No. 22	at South Carolina rivalry	W 66–60	5–1 (0–1)	Carolina Coliseum; Columbia, South Carolina
December 21, 1996*	No. 22	vs. Washington State; Boise State Tournament	W 73–63	6–1 (0–1)	BSU Pavilion; Boise, Idaho
December 22, 1996*	No. 22	vs. Florida; Boise State Tournament	W 52–50	7–1 (0–1)	BSU Pavilion; Boise, Idaho
December 28, 1996*	No. 21	vs. Boston College; Dartmouth Tournament	W 55–52	8–1 (0–1)	Leede Arena; Hanover, New Hampshire
December 29, 1996*	No. 21	vs. Hofstra; Dartmouth Tournament	W 69–59	9–1 (0–1)	Leede Arena; Hanover, New Hampshire
January 2, 1997	No. 21	at Wake Forest	L 60–69	9–2 (0–2)	LJVM Coliseum; Winston-Salem, North Carolina
January 4, 1997	No. 21	at No. 9 Virginia	W 58–44	10–2 (1–2)	University Hall; Charlottesville, Virginia
January 8, 1997	No. 20	No. 11 NC State	W 60–54	11–2 (2–2)	Littlejohn Coliseum; Clemson, South Carolina
January 11, 1997	No. 20	Florida State	W 74–63	12–2 (3–2)	Littlejohn Coliseum; Clemson, South Carolina
January 13, 1997	No. 12	at Georgia Tech	W 67–59	13–2 (4–2)	Alexander Memorial Coliseum; Atlanta, Georgia
January 17, 1997	No. 12	Wake Forest	W 60–57	14–2 (5–2)	Littlejohn Coliseum; Clemson, South Carolina
January 20, 1997	No. 10	No. 9 North Carolina	L 63–75	14–3 (5–3)	Littlejohn Coliseum; Clemson, South Carolina
January 24, 1997	No. 10	at No. 24 Duke	L 61–70	14–4 (5–4)	Cameron Indoor Stadium; Durham, North Carolina
January 29, 1997	No. 17	No. 8 Virginia	L 65–75	14–5 (5–5)	Littlejohn Coliseum; Clemson, South Carolina
February 1, 1997*	No. 17	vs. No. 10 Texas; ACC–Big 12 Challenge	L 53–68	14–6 (5–5)	CU Events Center; Boulder, Colorado
February 5, 1997	No. 19	at No. 25 NC State	L 53–64	14–7 (5–6)	Reynolds Coliseum; Raleigh, North Carolina
February 8, 1997	No. 19	Georgia Tech	W 52–50	15–7 (6–6)	Littlejohn Coliseum; Clemson, South Carolina
February 11, 1997	No. 22	at No. 5 North Carolina	L 72–79	15–8 (6–7)	Carmichael Arena; Chapel Hill, North Carolina
February 16, 1997	No. 22	No. 18 Duke	W 72–69	16–8 (7–7)	Littlejohn Coliseum; Clemson, South Carolina
February 19, 1997	No. 21	at Florida State	W 71–47	17–8 (8–7)	Tallahassee–Leon County Civic Center; Tallahassee, Florida
February 22, 1997	No. 21	Maryland	L 64–70	17–9 (8–8)	Littlejohn Coliseum; Clemson, South Carolina
ACC Tournament
February 28, 1997*	No. 22	vs. NC State; ACC Tournament quarterfinal	W 87–75	18–9 (8–8)	Independence Arena; Charlotte, North Carolina
March 1, 1997*	No. 22	vs. No. 13 Virginia; ACC Tournament semifinal	W 77–75 ^{OT}	19–9 (8–8)	Independence Arena; Charlotte, North Carolina
March 2, 1997*	No. 22	vs. No. 5 North Carolina; ACC Tournament final	L 58–62	19–10 (8–8)	Independence Arena; Charlotte, North Carolina
NCAA Tournament
March 15, 1997*	No. 21	vs. Marquette; NCAA Tournament first round	L 66–70	19–11 (8–8)	Pete Maravich Assembly Center; Baton Rouge, Louisiana
*Non-conference game. ^{#}Rankings from AP Poll. (#) Tournament seedings in parentheses.
