= Arthur Marshall (American football) =

American football player (1969–2026)

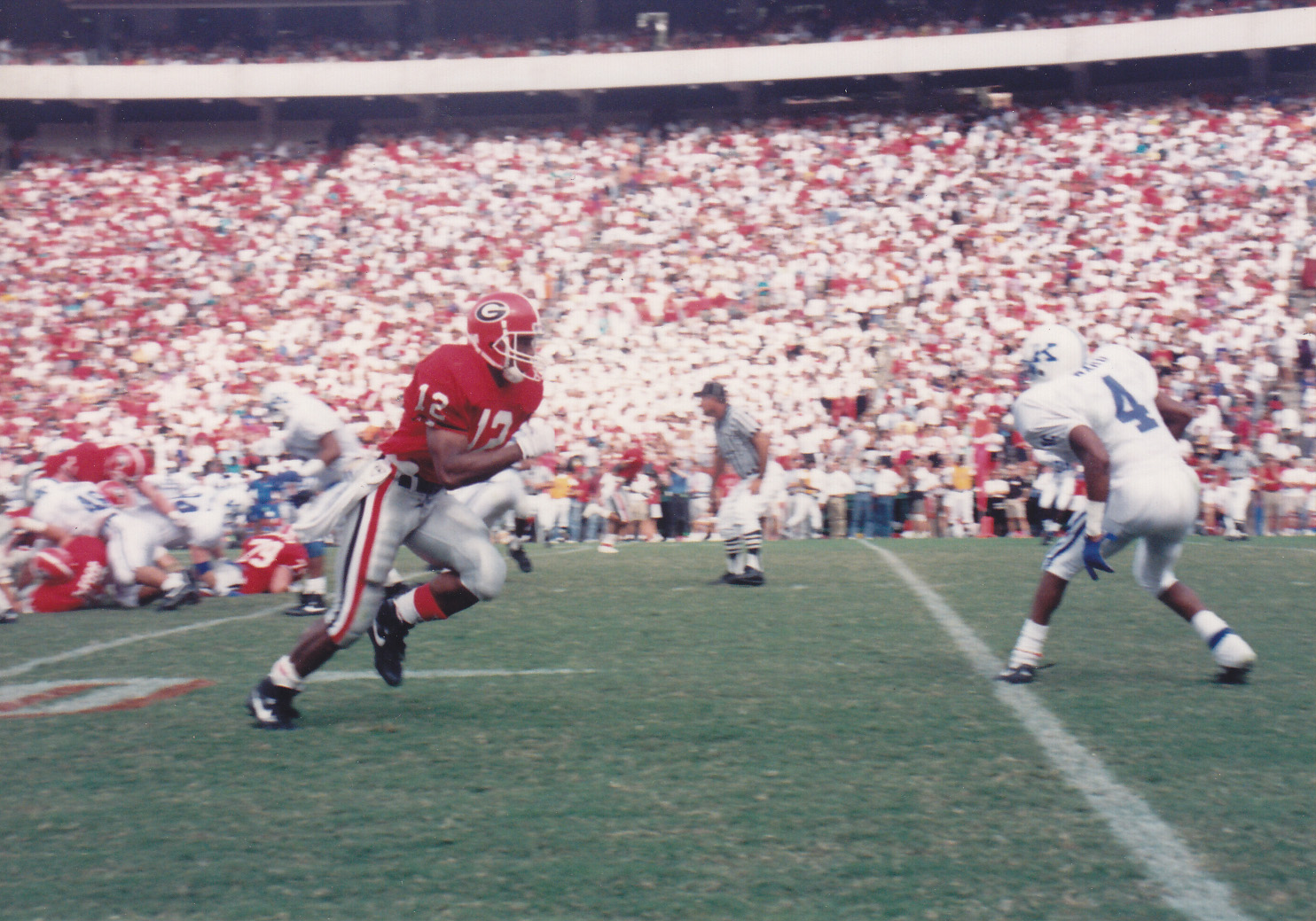
- Marshall (left) playing for UGA in 1991

No. 12, 83, 86
- Position: Wide receiver

Personal information
- Born: April 29, 1969; Hephzibah, Georgia, U.S.
- Died: August 31, 2026 (aged 57); Sarasota, Florida, U.S.
- Listed height: 5 ft 11 in (1.80 m)
- Listed weight: 186 lb (84 kg)

Career information
- High school: Hephzibah
- College: Georgia
- NFL draft: 1992: undrafted

Career history
- Denver Broncos (1992–1993); New York Giants (1994–1996)

Awards and highlights
- PFWA All-Rookie Team (1992)

Career NFL statistics
- Receptions: 87
- Receiving yards: 1,267
- Receiving touchdowns: 4
- Stats at Pro Football Reference

Arthur James Marshall Jr. (April 29, 1969 – August 31, 2026) was an American professional football player who was a wide receiver in the National Football League (NFL). He was signed by the Denver Broncos as an undrafted free agent in 1992. He played college football for the Georgia Bulldogs. Marshall also played for the New York Giants.

== Early life ==
Marshall, born in Hephzibah, Georgia, was one of eight siblings, which included three brothers and four sisters. He played high school football for Hephzibah High which is located in Hephzibah, Georgia. Marshall graduated from high school with a 92.167 average. He scored a 1,020 on his SAT which earned him the Scholar Athlete of the Year Award for the state.

== Collegiate career ==
Marshall was a stretch-the-field type of wide receiver for head coach Ray Goff and the University of Georgia from 1988 to 1991. The 5-11, 175-pound speedster hauled in 39 receptions for 524 yards during his senior season in 1991 as the Bulldogs completed a 9-3 season ranked No. 19 by the AP College Football Poll.

Additionally, Marshall returned kickoffs for Georgia as he had totalled 15 such returns for 347 yards averaging 23.1 per return during 1991.

During his junior year at Georgia Marshall broke his leg and had a rod inserted. It didn't impact him playing on the field but impacted his chances in the NFL draft.

=== Statistics ===
| | Receiving | | | | | Rushing | | | |
| YEAR | REC | YDS | AVG | LNG | TD | ATT | YDS | AVG | TD |
|---|---|---|---|---|---|---|---|---|---|
| 1988 | 10 | 317 | 31.7 | 81 | 1 | 2 | −1 | −0.5 | 0 |
| 1989 | 16 | 325 | 20.3 | 46 | 2 | 2 | 10 | 5.0 | 0 |
| 1990 | — | — | — | — | — | — | — | — | — |
| 1991 | 39 | 524 | 13.4 | 50 | 1 | — | — | — | — |
| Totals | 65 | 1,166 | 17.9 | 81 | 4 | 4 | 9 | 2.3 | 0 |

== Professional career ==
Pre-draft measurables
| Height | Weight | Arm length | Hand span | 40-yard dash | 10-yard split | 20-yard split | 20-yard shuttle | Vertical jump | Broad jump |
|---|---|---|---|---|---|---|---|---|---|
| 5 ft 9 5/8 in (1.77 m) | 179 lb (81 kg) | 29 7/8 in (0.76 m) | 9 1/4 in (0.23 m) | 4.67 s | 1.60 s | 2.68 s | 4.00 s | 38.0 in (0.97 m) | 10 ft 5 in (3.18 m) |
All values from NFL Combine

Marshall was picked up by the Denver Broncos after going undrafted in the 1992 NFL Draft. As a rookie, Marshall had solid numbers for a No. 2 wide receiver with 26 catches for 493 yards and a touchdown. Denver finished the 1992 season at 8–8 while Marshall also handled the return duties for the Broncos. He totalled 33 punt returns for 349 yards while averaging 10.6 yards per return. Marshall's longest punt return was 47 yards that year while he also covered some kickoff returns—eight for 132 yards and a 16.5 yard average.

In a game against the Dallas Cowboys, Marshall completed an 81-yard touchdown pass to Broncos' teammate Cedric Tillman. This tied a record held by Gary Hammond for the longest pass completion by a non-quarterback in NFL history. The record has since been equaled by Pittsburgh Steelers punter Josh Miller in 2003.

In 1993, Marshall's Denver Broncos finished third in the AFC West Division at 9–7. He remained as one of quarterback John Elway's top receivers by hauling in 28 receptions for 360 yards and two scores. Their season came to an end following an AFC Wild Card matchup that pitted them against the Los Angeles Raiders on January 9, 1994. The Raiders won the contest, 42–24.

Soon, Marshall joined his former Georgia Bulldogs teammate Rodney Hampton as he was picked up by Hampton's New York Giants in a trade made by Denver on April 26, 1994, for a seventh-round draft choice in return. Marshall's new team finished at 9-7 in '94 as he had 16 catches for 219 yards while playing in all 16 games. Also, Marshall resumed his kick return duties as he had 15 kickoff returns for 249 yards (16.6 average) that included a longest return of 30 yards.

His last two seasons in the NFL were spent with the same franchise as the New York Giants struggled going 5-11 and 6-10 in 1995 and 1996 respectively. Marshall totalled 17 catches for 195 yards and a touchdown in 1995. In 1996, Marshall was used as the team's punt returner as he recorded 13 returns for 144 yards (11.1 average) and a longest return of 36 yards.

=== Statistics ===
| | Receiving | | | | | | Rushing | | | | |
| YEAR | TEAM | REC | YDS | AVG | LNG | TD | ATT. | YDS | AVG | LNG | TD |
|---|---|---|---|---|---|---|---|---|---|---|---|
| 1992 | DEN | 26 | 493 | 19.0 | 80 | 1 | 11 | 56 | 5.1 | 16 | 0 |
| 1993 | DEN | 28 | 360 | 12.9 | 40 | 2 | 0 | 0 | 0.0 | 0 | 0 |
| 1994 | NYG | 16 | 219 | 13.7 | 34 | 0 | 2 | 8 | 4.0 | 6 | 0 |
| 1995 | NYG | 17 | 195 | 11.5 | 27 | 1 | 1 | 1 | 1.0 | 1 | 0 |
| 1996 | NYG | 0 | 0 | 0.0 | 0 | 0 | 0 | 0 | 0.0 | 0 | 0 |
| Totals | | 87 | 1,267 | 14.6 | 80 | 4 | 11 | 65 | 4.6 | 16 | 0 |

== Personal life and death ==
In June 2010, Marshall was sentenced to 69 months in prison for bank fraud. Marshall died of stomach cancer in Sarasota, Florida, on August 31, 2026, at the age of 57.
