= Digital Trends =

Tech news, lifestyle, and information website

- Screenshot Screenshot of Digital Trends from February 14, 2017
- Website type: Technology news, technology products
- Available in: English, Spanish
- Owner: Digital Trends Media Group
- Creators: Ian Bell, Dan Gaul
- Editor: Andrew Martonik
- Website: www.digitaltrends.com
- Commercial: Yes
- Registration: No
- Launched: June 2006; 20 years ago
- Current status: Online
- OCLC number: 810203593

Digital Trends is a Portland, Oregon-based tech news, lifestyle, and information website that publishes news, reviews, guides, how-to articles, descriptive videos and podcasts about technology and consumer electronics products. With offices in Portland, Oregon, New York City, Chicago, and other locations, Digital Trends is operated by Digital Trends Media Group, a media company that also publishes Digital Trends Español, focusing on Spanish speakers worldwide, and a men's lifestyle site The Manual.

The site offers reviews and information on a wide array of products that have been shaped by technology. That includes consumer electronics products such as smartphones, video games and systems, laptops, PCs and peripherals, televisions, home theater systems, digital cameras, video cameras, tablets, and more.

According to third-party web analytics provider SimilarWeb, the site received over 40 million visits per month As of June 2018. From 2014 to 2021, Digital Trends' editorial team was led by Editor-in-chief Jeremy Kaplan and guided by Co-founders Ian Bell and Dan Gaul. Kaplan left the site in May 2021. The website's About Us page lists former Mobile Section Editor Andrew Martonik as "interim editor in chief."

== History ==
Ian Bell and Dan Gaul founded Digital Trends in June 2006 in Lake Oswego, Oregon.

In May 2009, Digital Trends moved its headquarters from Lake Oswego into the US Bancorp Tower in Downtown Portland, Oregon. The company opened a second office in New York City in 2012. Digital Trends is a privately funded and owned corporation. Digital Trends en Español, a Spanish-language version of the site that offers original reporting focusing on the spanish speaking consumers worldwide, was launched in December 2014. Editor-in-Chief Juan Garcia leads an international team, among them Milenka Pena, an Emmy Award nominee and Silver Done Award recipient, who works as the News Editor for the Spanish site.

Digital Trends saw a surge in popularity in recent years; the site claimed a 100-percent increase in traffic in September 2015, reaching over 24 million unique readers globally and more than 13 million U.S. readers. It currently reaches approximately 30 million readers per month, who view over 100 million pages.

In addition to growth, 2015 saw a series of changes for Digital Trends. The site expanded its awards program to include several international trade shows, including Mobile World Congress in Barcelona and IFA in Berlin. It also launched its first car of the year awards and Smart Home awards, underscoring the site's growing investment in these areas. The company also launched DT Design, an in-house creative ad agency, to focus on branded content and high-impact advertising units.

In late summer of 2016, Re/Code reported on a deal with Conde Nast to acquire Digital Trends for $120 million, noting that the site is expected to generate $30 million in revenue this year and around $6 million in profit. Bell denied that his company was in talks, but acknowledged that the company "is periodically approached by would-be buyers." Digiday wrote about the deal as well, comparing the site's traffic to "such properties as the Purch network, CNET and The Verge, and ahead of USA Today Tech, Yahoo! Tech, and Business Insider's Tech Insider." In June 2020, as Digital Trends posted Black Lives Matter support statements, employees observed racial bias at a "Gin and Juice" party in 2018 and harassment at a 2017 holiday party. CEO Ian Bell noted "I'm not a proponent of cancel culture." In 2020, Gresham, Oregon Mayor Travis Stovall joined Digital Trends' board of directors.

As of 2021, Digital Trends built its advertising business around data, including intent-based audience segmentation. The company partnered with Valnet, the parent of Screen Rant, to pool resources and target larger news audiences.

== See also ==
- List of companies based in Oregon
