= Dan Kurzius =

American businessman (born 1971/72)

- Born: 1971 or 1972 (age 54–55)
- Occupation: Businessman
- Known for: Co-founder and chief customer officer, Mailchimp
- Children: 2

Dan Kurzius (born 1971/1972) is an American billionaire businessman, the co-founder and chief customer officer of Mailchimp.

== Early life ==
Kurzius's father ran a bakery-deli in Albuquerque, New Mexico that was "eventually forced out of business by big bakery chains", and he had a fatal heart attack a few years later, when Dan was 14.

== Career ==
Kurzius started out as a DJ then worked in real estate.

In 2001, Kurzius and Ben Chestnut were running a web design company and founded Mailchimp, which they own jointly, as a sideline. The company has always been self-funding, and has never had any outside funding.

As of March 2019, Forbes estimates Kurzius' net worth at $2.1 billion which makes him one of 13 residents from Georgia that are included in Forbes' 33rd annual ranking of the world's billionaires.

== Personal life ==
Kurzius is married with two daughters, and lives in Atlanta, Georgia.

He collects vintage skateboards.

Kurzius's younger brother Rex Kurzius is the founder and CEO of Asset Panda, a cloud-based SaaS platform and mobile app which is used for tracking, managing, and auditing fixed assets and equipment.
