= LemonStand =

Canadian e-commerce company

- Developer: LemonStand eCommerce Inc.
- Written in: PHP
- Operating system: Cross-platform
- Type: Shopping cart, Webshop
- License: Software as a service
- Website: lemonstand.com

LemonStand was a Canadian e-commerce company headquartered in Vancouver, British Columbia, that developed cloud-based computer software for online retailers. LemonStand was shut down on June 5, 2019.

== History ==
LemonStand Version 1 was launched on July 28, 2001. It is written in the PHP programming language.

Version 1 was released as an on-premises proprietary licensed software, and the commercial license was not free. However, there was a free trial license available.

June 2012, LemonStand raised seed funding from the BDC Venture Capital, and a group of angel investors.

December 20, 2013, a cloud-based SaaS version of the LemonStand eCommerce platform was released publicly.

May 9, 2014, LemonStand and Payfirma, a payments processing company, partnered to provide integrated services for online retailers.

May 3, 2016, LemonStand raised funding from BDC Venture Capital and Silicon Valley–based angel investors.

March 5, 2019, LemonStand announced their intention to shut down on June 5, 2019. LemonStand was quietly acquired by Mailchimp at the end of February.

== Pricing ==
LemonStand offered three levels of service plans. LemonStand did not charge any transaction fees.

== See also ==
- Shopping cart software
- Comparison of shopping cart software
