= Ben Chestnut =

American entrepreneur (born 1973/74)

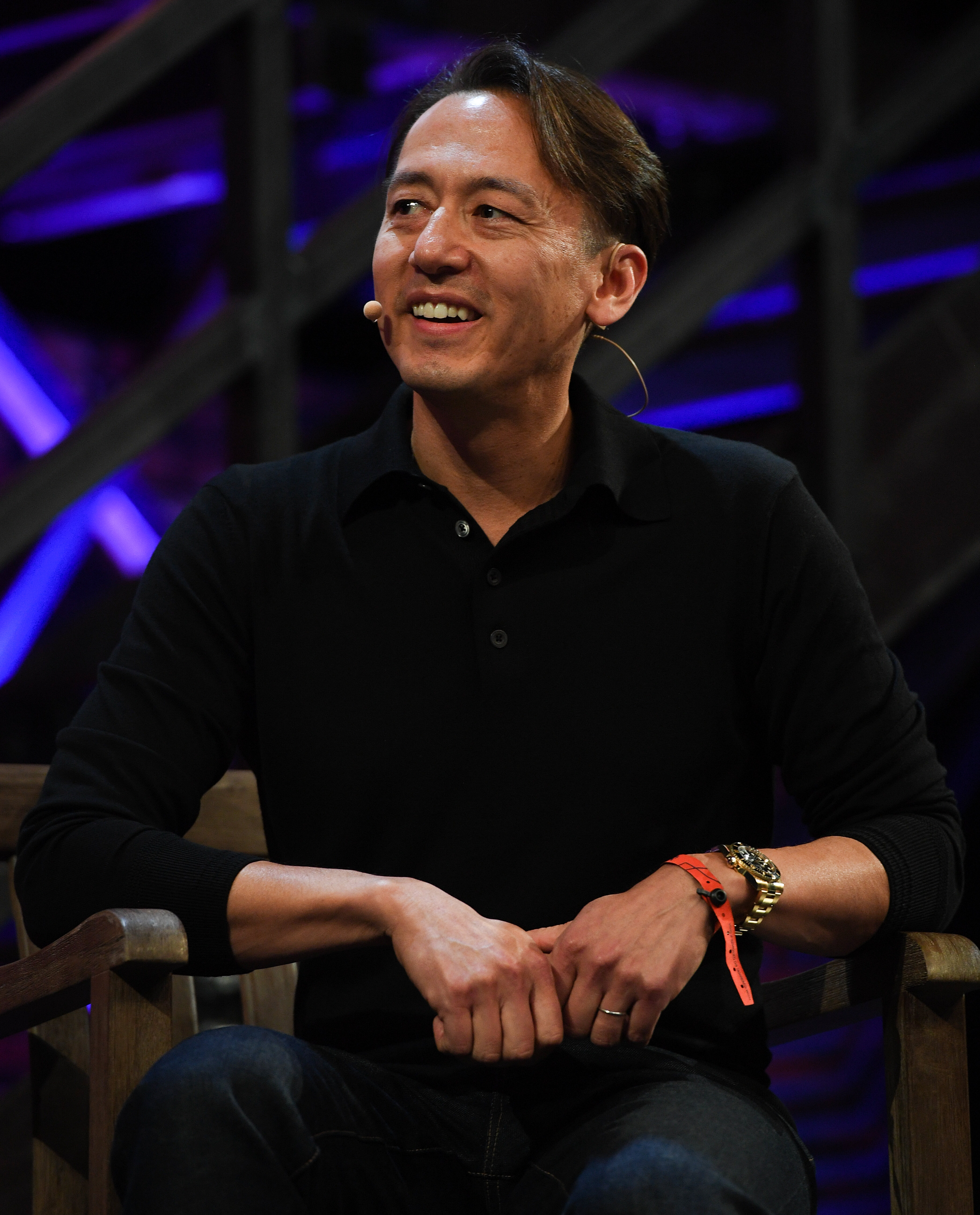
- Chestnut in 2019
- Born: 1973 or 1974 (age 51–52); Augusta, Georgia, US
- Education: University of Georgia; Georgia Institute of Technology
- Occupation: Internet entrepreneur
- Known for: Co-founder and former CEO of Mailchimp
- Children: 2

Ben Chestnut (born 1973/1974) is an American Internet entrepreneur. He is the co-founder (with Dan Kurzius) and former CEO of Mailchimp, an email marketing company. As of November 2022, his net worth was estimated at US$4.1 billion.

== Early life ==
Ben Chestnut was born and raised in Augusta, Georgia and attended high school in Hephzibah, Georgia. He studied physics at the University of Georgia and industrial design at the Georgia Institute of Technology.

== Career ==
He is the co-founder and former CEO of Rocket Science Group, commonly known as Mailchimp a CRM with 11 million users. In 2016, he was recognized as Ernst & Young's Entrepreneur of the Year. According to Atlanta Business Chronicle, in August 2017, Chestnut was awarded "Most Admired CEO". In October 2018, Forbes noted that Chestnut was a billionaire. In August 2022, Chestnut abruptly stepped down as CEO one month after sending a nearly 1,400-word email to a small group of employees identifying what he considered an alarming trend in his workforce: new hires introducing themselves in virtual meetings with their preferred pronouns.

== Personal life ==
Chestnut is married, with two children, and lives in Atlanta, Georgia.
