= Hephzibah High School =

Public high school in Hephzibah, Georgia, United States

Location
- 4558 Brothersville Road; Hephzibah, Georgia 30815; United States; 33°18′08″N 82°05′48″W

Information
- Type: Public
- Established: 1860
- School board: Richmond County Board of Education
- School district: Richmond County School System
- Superintendent: Kenneth Bradshaw
- Principal: Chris Nabahe
- Teaching staff: 86.00 (FTE)
- Grades: 9–12
- Student to teacher ratio: 12.87
- Colors: Red and black
- Mascot: Rebel
- Feeder schools: Hephzibah Middle School, Spirit Creek Middle School, Morgan Road Middle School
- Website: School website

Hephzibah High School is a high school located in south Richmond County in the town of Hephzibah, Georgia, United States. It is the largest high school, by attendance, in the Richmond County School System. It is located in a rural area and its students generally live in a rural or suburban setting.

== History ==
The school was established October 1860 by the Hephzibah Baptist Association and held its first session in temporary buildings until the first permanent building was completed in 1862. Hephzibah High is the second oldest high school in Richmond County. The Baptist Association, took their name, Hephzibah from Isaiah 62:4. They voted to put a school in the village called Brothersville. The association tried to rent the old Brothersville Academy that was started on James Anderson land in early 1840s. It's a common misconception that some think the two schools were the same. They were not. The Brothersville Academy was started by a Methodist, James Anderson, and closed a few short years after the death of the Anderson brothers. The Baptist Association tried to rent the old Brothersville Academy and a boarding house, but their efforts were futile. So, Baptist men, A. W. Rhodes donated 16 acres of land and Rev. J.H.T.Kilpatrick donated 50 acres of land. The association purchased 16 acres more and quickly began work on temporary building for the new school called The Hephzibah High School. The History of both Brothersville Academy and The Hephzibah High are told by Hephzibah's published historians, Rev. W. L. Kilpatrick in his work, The Hephzibah Baptist Centennial (1794–1894)and in A Lost Arcadia, by Walter A. Clark, published in 1909. These men were graduates of the old Brothersville Academy and saw it close and the new school built.

- Original schoolhouse:

Completed 1862 and served last class of 1924. It was torn down.

- Second school: 1925–1969. This school would serve as the junior high until 1983 and it also was torn down. Hephzibah elementary sits on its grounds today.
- Third school: 1969–present day

An explosion occurred in the school's gymnasium on November 19, 1953. It was caused by two boys smoking near a gas leak, and it resulted in five injuries and the death of six-year-old Gilda Joyce Martin.

In the 1998–1999 school year, Hephzibah's freshman class was housed at the Freshman Academy, in the old building for Floyd Graham Elementary School. This was done partially to ease overcrowding at the school and partially as a pilot project for the Richmond County Board of Education. Freshman Academy was shuttered after the construction of Cross Creek High School was completed in 1999 and made operating a second location for Hephzibah unnecessary. A new wing was added to the main facility that same year to finish the push to ease overcrowding at the school.

In 2008, Hephzibah unveiled its new football stadium whose construction caused a major redesign of its athletic facilities. A land swap occurred between the Richmond County School System and the Richmond County Recreational Department in order to provide enough land adjacent to Hephzibah to complete the design. The new stadium has double the capacity of its predecessor.

== Academics ==
Hephzibah offers two main tracks to graduation: vocational and college preparatory. The school offers Advanced Placement courses and honors-level courses within its college preparatory curriculum. The vocational track allows for a concentration in a particular vocation and offers programs in JROTC, agriculture, cosmetology, welding, and engine repair. The school also offers classes on the Christian Bible.

The high school meets many of the traditional markers of both failure and success in academics. On one hand, for the class of 2007, Hephzibah was cited as having a graduation rate of 39.7%. This statistic was found by the Augusta Chronicle by comparing the number of freshmen when the class entered high school to the number at graduation. Using the No Child Left Behind standard, which does not count students who have left school rolls without notice as dropouts, the school's graduation rate was 65.2% for the same year. Neither system has been verified with a student-by-student study of a given class. Many believe that the Augusta Chronicle's formula disadvantages schools like Hephzibah, given the large number of military children enrolled in classes. The school's proximity to Fort Gordon ensures that a number of students enroll and leave the school each year due to their parents' transience.

On the other hand, the school received an award for the largest positive change in average SAT score in the Georgia AAAA classification for the 2003–4 school year. The average SAT score for the 2006-2007 year was 1377.

== Student activities ==
=== Athletics ===
The school's mascots are the Rebels and Lady Rebels, and the school colors are red and black. With a student enrollment of 1,245, Hephzibah High is in the state's highest classification for varsity sports. Hephzibah's traditional athletic rival is nearby Butler High School, with many pranks between the two having been conducted since Butler's opening in 1960. When Cross Creek High School was opened in 1999, pulling students from these two rivals, Hephzibah High found a second rivalry.

The Lady Rebels basketball team is the most storied athletic team at Hephzibah High School. In 2005, they won the AAA Georgia State basketball championship. In the championship game, they defeated Kendrick High School to finish the season with a record of 33–0. Coach Wendell Lofton has led the team to more than 500 wins and has produced multiple NCAA Division I players. The Lady Rebels are 1–4 in state championship finals under Lofton. Le'coe Willingham, also a member of the Lady Rebels basketball team, won the 1998 AAAA state track and field high jump title. Two Hephzibah graduates, Itoro Umoh-Coleman and Joanne Aluka, played together on the Nigeria women's national basketball team at the 2004 Summer Olympics.

In 1972, the Rebel men's baseball team won Hephzibah's first state championship in any sport by defeating South Gwinnett High School in the Class A state baseball championship. This was after coming in second the year before to Roswell High School. The team was coached by a graduate of the class of 1952, Al Turner, who became the first inductee into the Hephzibah High School Hall of Fame. The entire baseball team was also inducted into the Hall. The baseball component of the athletic complex built in 2008 was named in Coach Turner's honor.

=== JROTC Rebel Battalion ===
Hephzibah High School's Army JROTC unit has been ranked as an honor unit with distinction since 1985. The unit's motto is "Rebel Battalion Leads the Way." In fall of 1998 the men's Raider Team were runners-up at the state competition. In 1999, they placed third in the same competition. In 2003, the women's Raider Team were runners-up in the state competition. The Raider Team also competed in the first Raider Team national championship, held in Athens, Georgia in 2007. The unit also has strong ties to the community, performing over 3,000 hours of community service in 2008.

In 2010, Hephzibah's rifle range facility was destroyed in an apparent arson. Five juveniles were arrested in connection with the crime.

=== Marching Band ===
Hephzibah's marching band is nicknamed the Big Red Marching Machine. For thirty years, the band was directed by Atys Kirkland as a traditional, high-stepping style marching band (such as those seen in the movie Drumline, as opposed to the styles of most colleges such as the Fightin' Texas Aggie Band). In the 1980s they were successful enough to be invited to perform at the Macy's Thanksgiving Day parade. They were forced to decline the invitation due to a lack of funding.

By the late 1990s, members of the Hephzibah community had become less comfortable with the increasing influence of hip hop and R&B on the band's style. This became evident with a media focus on the dancing corps of the band, known as the Rebelettes, who were deemed too "jiggy" to be appropriate. The dancing corps' style of dress and dance opened a greater dialogue about the shifting attitudes of appropriateness in the community in the 1990s. Briefly, the school performed in the corps style of marching, but it has since returned to its original marching style. The band also participates in the CSRA Classic, an annual traditional style marching band competition held in Augusta, Georgia.

Since 2014 the band has performed in such activities as the Atlanta Football Classic Parade, the CSRA Classic, Paine College Football Games, Border Bowl II, and most recently the Augusta MLK Parade, in addition most recently the band has performed at South Carolina State Band Day, the Aiken Black History Parade, and the Benedict College Band Day. They are also one of the flagship schools for the Augusta Mass Band.

== Notable alumni ==
Name	Class year	Notability	Reference(s)
Joanne Aluka	1997	2004 Athens Olympics, Nigerian Women's Basketball	
James Carpenter	2007	NFL player, Seattle Seahawks	
Wendell Chavous	2003 (approx.)	NASCAR driver	
Kalenna Harper	2000	Singer/songwriter, part of P. Diddy's group Dirty Money	
Brandon Lynch	2000	NFL player, Tennessee Titans, Indianapolis Colts	
Arthur Marshall	1987	NFL player, New York Giants, Denver Broncos	
Vaughn Taylor	1995	PGA Tour player	
Itoro Umoh-Coleman	1995	WNBA player, Houston Comets, Clemson head coach	
Le'coe Willingham	1999	WNBA player, Phoenix Mercury	

== See also ==
- Richmond County School System
