= Joanne Aluka-White =

Nigerian-American basketball coach (born 1979)

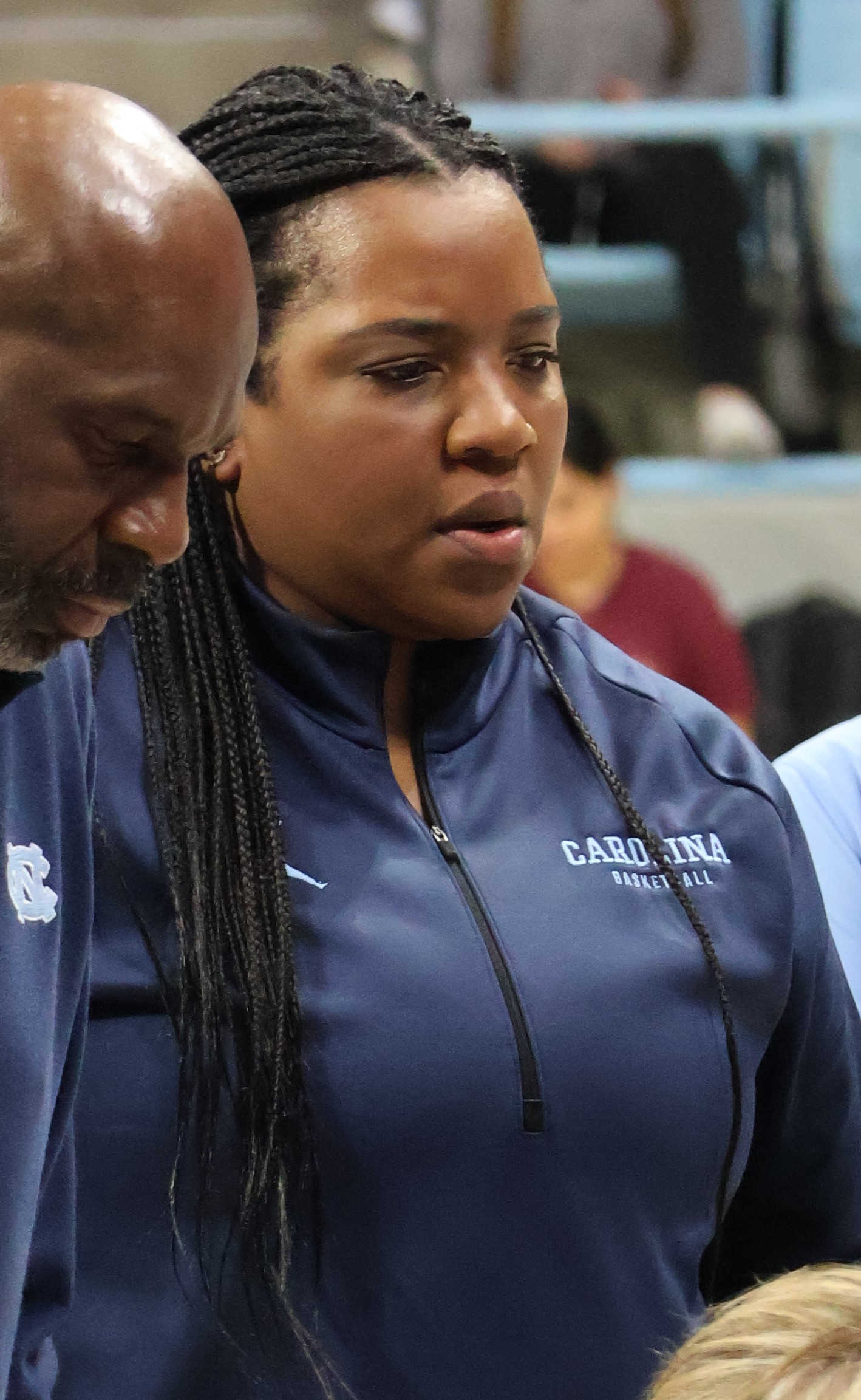

North Carolina Tar Heels
- Position: Associate Head Coach
- Conference: Atlantic Coast Conference

Personal information
- Born: April 26, 1979 (age 47) Jackson, Mississippi, U.S.
- Listed height: 5 ft 11 in (1.80 m)

Career information
- High school: Hephzibah (Augusta, Georgia)
- College: Middle Tennessee (1997–2001)
- Coaching career: 2006–present

Career history

Playing
- Dallas Fury

Coaching
- 2006–2012: FIU (assistant coach)
- 2012–2019: Charlotte (assistant coach, associate head coach)
- 2019–: North Carolina (assistant coach, associate head coach)

Joanne Aluka-White (born April 26, 1979) is a Nigerian-American basketball coach and former player who is currently an assistant coach for the North Carolina Tar Heels women's basketball team. She was previously an assistant coach at Charlotte and FIU. She played college basketball for the Middle Tennessee Blue Raiders and represented Nigeria at the 2004 Summer Olympics.

== Early life and education ==
She was born in Jackson, Mississippi, United States, and acquired Nigerian citizenship through her parents. She attended Hephzibah High School in the state of Georgia. She was a graduate of Middle Tennessee State with a bachelor's degree in behavioral science in 2001 and went further to complete her master's degree in human performance with a concentration in sports management in 2003. She married Fred White and they have twins, Daniel and Gabrielle.

== Playing career ==
Aluka competed at the 2004 Summer Olympics in Athens, Greece, with the Nigeria women's national basketball team. After the Olympics, Aluka joined and played for a while with the Dallas Fury in the National Women's Basketball League.

== Coaching career ==
Aluka experienced her first coaching job at FIU where her responsibilities included assisting with recruiting, on-floor game and practice coaching as well as promotions and camps.

Aluka-White became an assistant coach for North Carolina in 2019.

== Career statistics ==
Year	Team	GP	GS	MPG	FG%	3P%	FT%	RPG	APG	SPG	BPG	TO	PPG
1997–98	Middle Tennessee	30	-	-	44.9	0.0	51.8	6.0	0.7	2.7	0.3	-	9.5
1998–99	Middle Tennessee	Did not play due to injury											
1999–00	Middle Tennessee	29	-	-	54.8	0.0	57.3	6.3	1.0	0.9	0.1	-	11.0
2000–01	Middle Tennessee	30	-	-	54.4	0.0	58.0	6.5	0.8	1.0	0.1	-	11.7
2001–02	Middle Tennessee	23	-	-	40.7	33.3	66.7	3.7	0.9	0.4	0.2	-	5.9
Career		112	-	-	49.8	20.0	57.3	5.8	0.8	1.3	0.2	-	9.7
Statistics retrieved from Sports-Reference.

== Achievement ==
- Scoring over 1,000 career points
- Earned Ohio Valley Conference Freshman of the Year honors during her four-year career
- Team captain that helped the Blue Raiders capture an Ohio Valley Tournament Championship and a bid to the NCAA Tournament during her career
- Played professionally in Portugal and helped her team to the National Cup Championship game in 2004
