= Asset Panda =

Cloud-based asset management and asset tracking platform

- Industry: Technology; Information technology; Software development; Cloud computing
- Founded: 2012; 14 years ago
- Founders: Rex Kurzius
- Headquarters: Dallas, Texas, United States
- Area served: Worldwide
- Number of employees: ~200
- Website: assetpanda.com

Asset Panda is a cloud-based asset management and tracking platform designed to help organizations monitor, inspect and report on physical assets throughout their entire lifecycle. Instead of relying on manual spreadsheets, it centralizes data related to equipment, tools, IT hardware, vehicles, facility components, and inventory in one place.

It is mainly used in the healthcare, education, construction, government, nonprofit and manufacturing industries.

== History ==
Asset Panda was founded in 2012 by Rex Kurzius.

Between 2015 and 2018, the company posted 3,779% revenue growth landing at #33 on Deloitte's Technology Fast 500 in 2019.

Asset Panda earned a top-10 ranking in 2020 and was also honored in The Innovation Awards, presented by Dallas Innovates and D CEO. In 2021, the company was named as the 11th fastest-growing technology company in North Texas as part of Tech Titans’ Fast Tech program.

In 2022, the company expanded into GPS-enabled construction management.

In 2025, Asset Panda promoted its chief financial and revenue officer Justin Lackey to president. In December 2025 of the same year, Ursa AI was introduced as part of Asset Panda Pro to speed configuration work that traditionally slows enterprise deployments.

== Reception ==
- In September 2023, TechRepublic listed Asset Panda among the 8 Best IT Asset Management Software and Tools.
- In May 2025, TechRadar considered Asset Panda among the Best IT asset management software of 2025.
- In July 2025, Forbes considered Asset Panda among the 8 Best IT Asset Management Software.
- In January 2026, GBHackers considered Asset Panda among the 10 Best IT Asset Management Tools in 2026.
- In January 2026, Cyber Press listed Asset Panda among the 10 Best IT Asset Management Solutions (ITAM) in 2026.
- In February 2026, Forbes listed Asset Panda among the 10 Best Asset Management Software.
- In September 2026, Tech.Co listed Asset Panda as their top choice for the best fixed asset tracking software.
