= North Carolina Tar Heels women's basketball =

Women's college basketball team

2026–27 North Carolina Tar Heels women's basketball team
- University: University of North Carolina at Chapel Hill
- Head coach: Courtney Banghart (8th season)
- Location: Chapel Hill, North Carolina
- Arena: Carmichael Auditorium (1975–2008); Dean Smith Center (2008–2009); Carmichael Arena (2009–present) (capacity: 6,822)
- Conference: ACC
- Nickname: Tar Heels
- Colors: Carolina blue and white

NCAA Division I tournament champions
- 1994
Other NCAA Division I tournament results
Final Four	1994, 2006, 2007
Elite Eight	1994, 1998, 2005, 2006, 2007, 2008, 2014
Sweet Sixteen	1984, 1986, 1993, 1994, 1995, 1997, 1998, 1999, 2000, 2002, 2005, 2006, 2007, 2008, 2011, 2014, 2015, 2022, 2025, 2026
Appearances	1983, 1984, 1985, 1986, 1987, 1992, 1993, 1994, 1995, 1997, 1998, 1999, 2000, 2002, 2003, 2004, 2005, 2006, 2007, 2008, 2009, 2010, 2011, 2013, 2014, 2015, 2019, 2021, 2022, 2023, 2024, 2025, 2026

Conference tournament champions
- 1984, 1994, 1995, 1997, 1998, 2005, 2006, 2007, 2008

Conference regular-season champions
- 1997, 2005, 2006, 2008

Uniforms
Home	Away

The North Carolina Tar Heels women's basketball team represent the University of North Carolina at Chapel Hill in the Atlantic Coast Conference of NCAA Division I women's college basketball. They are led by head coach Courtney Banghart, who is in her sixth season.

== Home arenas ==
In 1930, the first team of Carolina female students played somes against high school teams under the name "Tar Heelettes." The first women's team played an intercollegiate game against Campbell in 1933, which the Carolina team lost 12–36.

While historic Carmichael Auditorium was under renovation, the women's team played the 2008–09 season at the Dean Smith Center to the south of campus. The final game at the old Carmichael was an 82–51 rout of local rivals Duke in front of a sell-out attendance of 8,010, completing an unbeaten home and conference season. Upon reopening, the building's name was changed to Carmichael Arena.

== Year by year results ==
The women's basketball team was officially established in 1971 as part of the Department of Physical Education. In 1974, basketball and several other women's sports came under the direction of the athletic department with Angela Lumpkin as coach. Conference play began in 1978, with a first qualification for the NCAA tournament in 1983.

Season	Team	Overall	Conference	Standing	Postseason	Coaches' poll	AP poll
Angela Lumpkin (Independent) (1974–1977)
1974–75	Angela Lumpkin	15–3			NWIT First Round		
1975–76	Angela Lumpkin	16–7			NCAIAW Tournament		
1976–77	Angela Lumpkin	8–16			NCAIAW Tournament		
Angela Lumpkin:		39–26					
Atlantic Coast Conference
Jennifer Alley (ACC) (1977–1986)
1977–78	Jennifer Alley	16–13	6–4	3rd	AIAW Southern Region II		
1978–79	Jennifer Alley	18–14	4–5	4th	AIAW Region II Tournament		
1979–80	Jennifer Alley	21–15	5–5	T-4th	NWIT Runner-Up		
1980–81	Jennifer Alley	17–14	5–4	5th	NCAIAW Tournament		
1981–82	Jennifer Alley	17–12	10–3	3rd			
1982–83	Jennifer Alley	22–8	10–3	T-2nd	NCAA First Round		18
1983–84	Jennifer Alley	24–8	9–5	T-3rd	NCAA Sweet Sixteen		14
1984–85	Jennifer Alley	21–11	11–3	2nd	NCAA First Round		
1985–86	Jennifer Alley	23–9	10–4	2nd	NCAA Sweet Sixteen	15	16
Jennifer Alley:		179–104	70–36				
Sylvia Hatchell (ACC) (1986–2019)
1986–87	Sylvia Hatchell	19–10	9–5	3rd	NCAA Second Round (Bye)		
1987–88	Sylvia Hatchell	10–17	4–10	6th			
1988–89	Sylvia Hatchell	10–20	1–13	8th			
1989–90	Sylvia Hatchell	13–15	3–11	8th			
1990–91	Sylvia Hatchell	12–16	2–12	8th			
1991–92	Sylvia Hatchell	22–9	9–7	T-3rd	NCAA Second Round (Bye)		
1992–93	Sylvia Hatchell	23–7	11–5	T-2nd	NCAA Sweet Sixteen	15	17
1993–94	Sylvia Hatchell	33–2	14–2	2nd	NCAA Champions	1	4
1994–95	Sylvia Hatchell	30–5	12–4	2nd	NCAA Sweet Sixteen	11	11
1995–96	Sylvia Hatchell	13–14	8–8	5th			
1996–97	Sylvia Hatchell	29–3	15–1	1st	NCAA Sweet Sixteen	9	4
1997–98	Sylvia Hatchell	27–7	11–5	4th	NCAA Elite Eight	3	7
1998–99	Sylvia Hatchell	28–8	11–5	T-3rd	NCAA Sweet Sixteen	14	14
1999–2000	Sylvia Hatchell	20–13	8–9	5th	NCAA Sweet Sixteen	18	
2000–01	Sylvia Hatchell	15–14	7–9	7th			
2001–02	Sylvia Hatchell	26–9	11–5	2nd	NCAA Sweet Sixteen	11	16
2002–03	Sylvia Hatchell	28–6	13–3	2nd	NCAA Second Round	15	12
2003–04	Sylvia Hatchell	24–7	12–4	2nd	NCAA First Round	21	12
2004–05	Sylvia Hatchell	30–4	12–2	T-1st	NCAA Elite Eight	6	4
2005–06	Sylvia Hatchell	33–2	13–1	1st	NCAA Final Four	3	1
2006–07	Sylvia Hatchell	34–4	11–3	2nd	NCAA Final Four	3	2
2007–08	Sylvia Hatchell	33–3	14–0	1st	NCAA Elite Eight	5	2
2008–09	Sylvia Hatchell	28–7	10–4	4th	NCAA Second Round	17	11
2009–10	Sylvia Hatchell	19–12	6–8	T-7th	NCAA First Round		
2010–11	Sylvia Hatchell	28–9	8–6	6th	NCAA Sweet Sixteen	12	14
2011–12	Sylvia Hatchell	20–11	9–7	T-6th		19	13
2012–13	Sylvia Hatchell	29–7	14–4	T-2nd	NCAA Second Round	18	13
2013–14	Sylvia Hatchell	27–10	10–6	T-5th	NCAA Elite Eight	12	13
2014–15	Sylvia Hatchell	26–9	10–6	6th	NCAA Sweet Sixteen	15	12
2015–16	Sylvia Hatchell	14–18	4–12	12th			
2016–17	Sylvia Hatchell	15–16	3–13	T–13			
2017–18	Sylvia Hatchell	14–15	4–12	13th			
2018–19	Sylvia Hatchell	18–15	8–8	8th	NCAA First Round		
Sylvia Hatchell:		751–324	297–209				
Courtney Banghart (ACC) (2019–present)
2019–20	Courtney Banghart	16–14	7–11	T–11th			
2020–21	Courtney Banghart	13–11	8–9	8th	NCAA First Round		
2021–22	Courtney Banghart	25–7	13–5	T–3rd	NCAA Sweet Sixteen	16	17
2022–23	Courtney Banghart	22–11	11–7	T–6th	NCAA Second Round	21	20
2023–24	Courtney Banghart	20–13	11–7	T–7th	NCAA Second Round		
2024–25	Courtney Banghart	29–8	13–5	T–4th	NCAA Sweet Sixteen	14	12
2025–26	Courtney Banghart	28–8	14–4	3rd	NCAA Sweet Sixteen	13	13
Courtney Banghart:		153–72	77–48				
Total:		1123–525 (.681)					
National champion Postseason invitational champion Conference regular season champion Conference regular season and conference tournament champion Division regular season champion Division regular season and conference tournament champion Conference tournament champion

== NCAA tournament results ==
North Carolina has appeared in the NCAA Division I women's basketball tournament 33. They have a record of 55–32.

Year	Seed	Round	Opponent	Result
1983	#7	First Round	#2 Georgia	L 72–70
1984	#2	First Round; Sweet Sixteen	#7 St. John's #3 Cheyney	W 81–79 (OT); L 73–72 (OT)
1985	#6	First Round	#3 Penn State	L 98–79
1986	#4	Second Round; Sweet Sixteen	#5 UNLV #1 USC	W 82–76; L 84–70
1987	#4	Second Round	#5 Old Dominion	L 76–58
1992	#7	First Round; Second Round	#10 Old Dominion #2 Miami (FL)	W 60–54; L 86–72
1993	#4	First Round; Second Round	#5 Alabama #1 Tennessee	W 74–73 (OT); L 74–54
1994	#3	First Round; Second Round; Sweet Sixteen; Elite Eight; Final Four; Championship	#14 Georgia Southern #6 Old Dominion #2 Vanderbilt #1 Connecticut #1 Purdue #3 Louisiana Tech	W 101–53; W 62–52; W 73–69; W 81–69; W 89–74; W 60–59
1995	#3	First Round; Second Round; Sweet Sixteen	#14 Western Illinois #6 Seton Hall #2 Stanford	W 89–48; W 59–45; L 81–71
1997	#1	First Round; Second Round; Sweet Sixteen	#16 Harvard #8 Michigan State #5 George Washington	W 78–53; W 81–71; L 55–46
1998	#2	First Round; Second Round; Sweet Sixteen; Elite Eight	#15 Howard #7 FIU #3 Illinois #1 Tennessee	W 91–71; W 85–72; W 80–74; L 76–70
1999	#4	First Round; Second Round; Sweet Sixteen	#13 Northeastern #5 Alabama #1 Purdue	W 64–55; W 70–56; L 82–59
2000	#5	First Round; Second Round; Sweet Sixteen	#12 Maine #13 Rice #1 Georgia	W 62–57; W 83–50; L 83–57
2002	#4	First Round; Second Round; Sweet Sixteen	#13 Harvard #5 Minnesota #1 Vanderbilt	W 85–58; W 72–69; L 70–61
2003	#3	First Round; Second Round	#14 Austin Peay #6 Colorado	W 72–70; L 86–67
2004	#4	First Round	#13 MTSU	L 67–62
2005	#1	First Round; Second Round; Sweet Sixteen; Elite Eight	#16 Coppin State #9 George Washington #5 Arizona State #2 Baylor	W 97–62; W 71–47; W 79–72; L 72–63
2006	#1	First Round; Second Round; Sweet Sixteen; Elite Eight; Final Four	#16 UC Riverside #8 Vanderbilt #4 Purdue #2 Tennessee #1 Maryland	W 75–51; W 89–70; W 70–68; W 75–63; L 81–70
2007	#1	First Round; Second Round; Sweet Sixteen; Elite Eight; Final Four	#16 Prairie View A&M #9 Notre Dame #5 George Washington #2 Purdue #1 Tennessee	W 95–38; W 60–51; W 70–56; W 84–72; L 56–50
2008	#1	First Round; Second Round; Sweet Sixteen; Elite Eight	#16 Bucknell #8 Georgia #4 Louisville #2 LSU	W 85–50; W 80–66; W 78–74; L 56–50
2009	#3	First Round; Second Round	#14 UCF #6 Purdue	W 85–80; L 85–70
2010	#10	First Round	#7 Gonzaga	L 82–76
2011	#5	First Round; Second Round; Sweet Sixteen	#12 Fresno State #4 Kentucky #1 Stanford	W 82–68; W 86–74; L 72–65
2013	#3	First Round; Second Round	#14 Albany #6 Delaware	W 59–54; L 78–69
2014	#4	First Round; Second Round; Sweet Sixteen; Elite Eight	#13 UT Martin #5 Michigan State #1 South Carolina #2 Stanford	W 60–58; W 62–53; W 65–58; L 74–65
2015	#4	First Round; Second Round; Sweet Sixteen	#13 Liberty #5 Ohio State #1 South Carolina	W 71–65; W 86–84; L 67–65
2019	#9	First Round	#8 California	L 92–72
2021	#10	First Round	#7 Alabama	L 71–80
2022	#5	First Round; Second Round; Sweet Sixteen	#12 Stephen F. Austin #4 Arizona #1 South Carolina	W 79–66; W 63–45; L 61–69
2023	#6	First Round; Second Round	#11 St. John's #3 Ohio State	W 61–59; L 69–71
2024	#8	First Round; Second Round	#9 Michigan State #1 South Carolina	W 59–56; L 41–88
2025	#3	First Round; Second Round; Sweet Sixteen	#14 Oregon State #6 West Virginia #2 Duke	W 70–49; W 58–47; L 38–47
2026	#4	First Round; Second Round; Sweet Sixteen	#13 Western Illinois #5 Maryland #1 UConn	W 83–51; W 74–66; L 42–63

== Retired numbers ==
North Carolina Tar Heels retired numbers
No.	Player	Position	Career	Year of retirement
12	Ivory Latta	G	2003-07	2008
23	Charlotte Smith	F	1991-95	1996

== Roster ==
2026–27 North Carolina Tar Heels women's basketball team
Players
Coaches

Pos.	#	Name	Height	Year	Previous school	Hometown
G	1	Jordan Zubich	5 ft 11 in (1.8 m)	Jr	Mountain Iron-Buhl	Mountain Iron, MN
G	3	Gabby White	5 ft 10 in (1.78 m)	So	Virginia	Chapel Hill, NC
G	4	Laila Hull	6 ft 1 in (1.85 m)	Sr	Zionsville Community	Zionsville, IN
G	5	Sophie Burrows	6 ft 2 in (1.88 m)	Sr	Syracuse	Lower Plenty, Victoria
G	7	Nyla Brooks	6 ft 1 in (1.85 m)	So	Bishop Ireton	Waldorf, MD
F	8	Achol Akot	6 ft 1 in (1.85 m)	Sr	Oklahoma State	Ottawa, Ontario
G	10	Reniya Kelly	5 ft 7 in (1.7 m)	Sr	Hoover	Hoover, AL
G	11	Kate Harpring	5 ft 7 in (1.7 m)	Sr	Hoover	Hoover, AL
G	13	Chloe Clardy	5 ft 9 in (1.75 m)	Sr	Stanford	Conway, AR
G	15	Sydney Barker	5 ft 7 in (1.7 m)	Sr	Jordan	Durham, NC
F	21	Ciera Toomey	6 ft 4 in (1.93 m)	RS Sr	Dunmore	Dunmore, PA
G	26	Taissa Queiroz	6 ft 1 in (1.85 m)	So	Cardinal Newman	Belo Horizonte, Brazil
C	34	Blanca Thomas	6 ft 5 in (1.96 m)	Jr	Charlotte Catholic	Charlotte, NC
C	52	Noelle Bofia	6 ft 4 in (1.93 m)	Fr	Xavier College Preparatory	Phoenix, AZ

Head coach

- Courtney Banghart (Dartmouth)

Assistant coach(es)

- Joanne Aluka-White (Middle Tennessee)
- Cory McNeill (Morgan State)
- Katherine Bixby (Ithaca)
- Daniel Metzelfeld (Trinity)
- Lexi Weger (Princeton)

Legend

- (C) Team captain
- (S) Suspended
- (I) Ineligible
- (W) Walk-on
- Injured
- Current redshirt

Roster
Last update: September 19, 2026
