= Hephzibah, Georgia =

- City
- Location in Richmond County and the state of Georgia

- Location within the state of Georgia Hephzibah (the United States)
- Coordinates: 33°18′15″N 82°5′53″W
- Country: United States
- State: Georgia
- County: Richmond

Area
  - Total: 19.56 sq mi (50.65 km^{2})
  - Land: 19.49 sq mi (50.47 km^{2})
  - Water: 0.069 sq mi (0.18 km^{2})

Population (2020)
  - Total: 3,830
  - Density: 196.6/sq mi (75.89/km^{2})
- ZIP code: 30815
- FIPS code: 13-38040
- Website: https://www.hephzibahga.gov/

Hephzibah (/ˈhɛpzɪbə/) is a city in southern Richmond County, in the U.S. state of Georgia. It is part of the Augusta metropolitan area as well as the Central Savannah River Area. The population was 4,011 at the 2010 census, and 3,830 in 2020. Hephzibah is a poetic name used in the Book of Isaiah (62:4) to refer to Jerusalem, meaning "My delight is in Her."

== History ==
Hephzibah was originally named Brothersville, in honor of three brothers who settled near one another. In October 1860, a Baptist seminary was established in Brothersville by a group of Appling residents. They established the Hephzibah Baptist Church in 1862. The prominence of these new religious institutions in the area swayed the state of Georgia to rename the town Hephzibah in 1870. In 1909, Walter A. Clark published a book of local history, named A Lost Arcadia - The Story of My Old Community, detailing the earliest days of Hephzibah.

In 1996 the governments of the city of Augusta and Richmond County combined to form a consolidated government. The residents of Hephzibah and nearby Blythe voted to maintain their separate city governments prior to this action. Some municipal services in Hephzibah are provided by the consolidated Augusta-Richmond County, while water, fire, and police services are maintained by the city.

== Geography ==
Hephzibah is located at 33°18′15″N 82°5′53″W (33.304126, -82.097923). According to the United States Census Bureau, the city has a total area of 19.4 square miles (50.2 km^{2}), of which 0.07 square miles (0.17 km^{2}), or 0.34%, is water.

== Demographics ==
Historical population
Census	Pop.	Note	%±
1900	541		—
1910	656		21.3%
1920	650		−0.9%
1930	646		−0.6%
1940	516		−20.1%
1950	525		1.7%
1960	676		28.8%
1970	987		46.0%
1980	1,452		47.1%
1990	2,466		69.8%
2000	3,880		57.3%
2010	4,011		3.4%
2020	3,830		−4.5%
U.S. Decennial Census

=== 2020 census ===
As of the 2020 census, there were 3,830 people, 1,424 households, and 1,022 families residing in the city. The median age was 43.2 years. 21.7% of residents were under the age of 18 and 18.4% of residents were 65 years of age or older. For every 100 females there were 97.1 males, and for every 100 females age 18 and over there were 95.0 males age 18 and over.

Hephzibah racial composition as of 2020
Race	Num.	Perc.
White (non-Hispanic)	2,168	56.61%
Black or African American (non-Hispanic)	1,319	34.44%
Native American	23	0.6%
Asian	9	0.23%
Pacific Islander	5	0.13%
Other/Mixed	190	4.96%
Hispanic or Latino	116	3.03%

0.0% of residents lived in urban areas, while 100.0% lived in rural areas.

Of all households, 32.2% had children under the age of 18 living in them. 51.7% were married-couple households, 16.2% were households with a male householder and no spouse or partner present, and 25.3% were households with a female householder and no spouse or partner present. About 21.8% of all households were made up of individuals, and 8.4% had someone living alone who was 65 years of age or older.

There were 1,564 housing units, of which 6.6% were vacant. The homeowner vacancy rate was 1.6% and the rental vacancy rate was 5.9%.

== Education ==
Richmond County School System, which covers all of Richmond County, operates public schools, including Hephzibah Elementary School, McBean Elementary, Hephzibah Middle School, Pine Hill Middle School, and Hephzibah High School.

There is also a charter school, Georgia School of Innovation and the Classics (GSIC).

== Highways ==
- US 25 / SR 121
- SR 88

== Notable people ==
- Darrell Blocker, CIA agent
- Wendell Chavous, NASCAR driver
- Ben Chestnut, founder and CEO of Mailchimp
- John Wesley Gilbert, first student and black professor of Paine College, one of the first black American archaeologists
- George Kitchens, Track and field athlete
- Arthur Marshall, former NFL wide receiver
- Marlon Riggs, filmmaker and educator
- Vaughn Taylor, PGA Tour golfer
- Itoro Umoh-Coleman, WNBA basketball player and Clemson assistant coach

== See also ==
- Hephzibah High School
