= Mailchimp =

US marketing automation platform and email marketing service

- Type: Subsidiary
- Industry: Email marketing
- Founded: 2001; 25 years ago
- Founders: Ben Chestnut; Mark Armstrong; Dan Kurzius
- Headquarters: Atlanta, Georgia
- Key people: Rania Succar (CEO)
- Products: Email marketing
- Revenue: $700 million (2019)
- Number of employees: 800+
- Parent: Intuit
- Divisions: TinyLetter
- Website: mailchimp.com

Mailchimp is a marketing automation and email marketing platform, operated by Rocket Science Group, a subsidiary of Intuit. Following its acquisition by Intuit in 2021, the platform has been branded as Intuit Mailchimp. The company was founded in 2001 by Ben Chestnut and Mark Armstrong, with Dan Kurzius later joining.

== History ==
Mailchimp was launched in 2001. The platform was named after one of their most popular e-greeting card characters, earning a few thousand dollars monthly. Mailchimp began as a paid service and added a freemium option in 2009. Within a year, its user base had grown from 85,000 to 450,000. By June 2014, it was sending over 10 billion emails per month on behalf of its users. As of 2020 more than 600 million emails are sent through the platform every two days.

In August 2017, it was reported that Mailchimp would be opening offices in Brooklyn and Oakland, California.

In February 2019, Mailchimp acquired LemonStand, a smaller competitor. Mailchimp later announced its plans to shift from mail distribution to offering a full marketing platform aimed at smaller organizations. This shift includes allowing customers to record and track customer leads within the platform, build landing pages and websites, and run ad retargeting advertisements on Facebook and Instagram. As part of this, Mailchimp acquired the London-based media and magazine company Courier Media in March 2020, with the stated goal of international growth. The magazine has a readership of 100,000 readers in more than 26 countries.

With founders Armstrong and Chestnut starting the company without outside funding or plans to go public, and never bringing on any outside investors thereafter, Mailchimp is considered an example of a successfully bootstrapped startup.

=== Acquisition by Intuit ===
After turning down repeated acquisition offers for 20 years, Bloomberg reported on August 31, 2021, that Mailchimp was talking with Intuit about being acquired. On September 13, 2021, Intuit confirmed it would acquire Mailchimp for approximately $12 billion in cash and stock. On November 1, 2021, Intuit officially completed the acquisition for $5.7bn in cash, $6.3bn in common stock, and 573,000 restricted stock units. At the time of the acquisition, Mailchimp had more than 13 million users globally, including approximately 2.4 million monthly active users.

After the acquisition, Intuit changed the name of the platform to Intuit Mailchimp. Following the acquisition, Intuit also integrated Mailchimp with its small business platform, including products such as QuickBooks and TurboTax, as part of a broader strategy to expand marketing automation and customer data capabilities for small businesses.

On November 19, 2026, Intuit announced that it will sell Intuit Mailchimp to Bending Spoons for $3.68 billion, of which $3.31 billion will be in cash. The acquisition is expected to close in early 2027, with the service changing its name back to Mailchimp.

== Marketing campaigns ==
As a podcast advertiser, Mailchimp sponsored the launch of Serial, a podcast exploring a murder case over multiple episodes.

Another ad became memorable for its inclusion of an unscripted mispronunciation of the company's name – "MailKimp" – as spoken by a 14-year-old girl from Norway waiting in line for an iPhone 6. The ad was parodied and "MailKimp" became a meme. In response, Mailchimp bought the domain name mailkimp.com and redirected traffic to mailchimp.com.

In 2018, Mailchimp underwent a brand redesign to help visually demonstrate an evolution from an email marketing tool to a larger marketing platform. This redesign included an updated logo, color palette, typeface, new imagery, and illustrations. It updated the Mailchimp wordmark to "Mailchimp" rather than "MailChimp" with an uppercase letter "C".

== Transactional email ==
In February 2016, Mailchimp announced it was merging Mandrill transactional email service into Mailchimp as an add-on feature and gave customers 60 days' notice to switch to the new pricing structure or find an alternative service platform. The new pricing structure required a paid Mailchimp plan before being able to purchase Mandrill credits, resulting in customers paying for two products to access Mandrill.

Previously, customers were able to purchase Mandrill credits for sending emails without signing up on Mailchimp. The credits were originally priced at $9.95 for 25,000 emails but increased to $20 for the same number of emails under the new pricing scheme. In addition to needing to purchase Mandrill credits, customers now need to be on a paid Mailchimp monthly plan (the minimum monthly plan being $10 a month), even if the customer has no need for Mailchimp services and only wants access to Mandrill. Mandrill was later renamed Mailchimp Transactional.

== Data breaches ==
In March 2022, Mailchimp suffered a data breach whereby intruders gained access to the data of 319 of their customers through social engineering. The exposed data includes email address, IP address, and the approximate location of their mailing list recipients.

A second data breach happened on January 11, 2024 when unauthorized actors gained access to an internal tool used by MailChimp customer support and account administration. The access was obtained through a social engineering attack on Mailchimp employees and contractors. The attackers compromised employee credentials and used them to access 133 Mailchimp accounts. The exposed data potentially included names, email addresses, and campaign information. Mailchimp has not confirmed this data breach and is still investigating the incident and assessing the full impact.

== See also ==
- Customer engagement
- Electronic mailing list
- Email marketing
- Email spam
- Marketing
- Digital marketing
