= 1984 NCAA Division I women's basketball championship game =

Women's basketball championship game

NCAA Division I women's basketball championship game
National championship game
Tennessee Lady Volunteers	USC Trojans
(23–9)	(28–4)
61	72
Head coach: Pat Summitt	Head coach: Linda Sharp
- AP: 15
- AP: 5
	1st half	2nd half	Total
Tennessee Lady Volunteers	28	33	61
USC Trojans	26	46	72
- Date: April 1, 1984
- Venue: Pauley Pavilion, Los Angeles, California
- MVP: Cheryl Miller, USC

United States TV coverage
- Network: CBS
- Announcers: Frank Glieber (play-by-play) and Ann Meyers (analyst)

The 1984 NCAA Division I women's basketball championship game was the final game of the 1984 NCAA Division I women's basketball tournament. It determined the champion of the 1983–84 NCAA Division I women's basketball season and was contested by the Tennessee Lady Volunteers and the USC Trojans. The game was played on April 1, 1984, at Pauley Pavilion in Los Angeles, California. After trailing by two points at halftime, No. 5 USC defeated No. 15 Tennessee 72–61 to capture back-to-back NCAA national championships. USC's Cheryl Miller was named the tournament's Most Outstanding Player once again.

== Participants ==
=== Tennessee Lady Volunteers ===
The Lady Volunteers, who represented the University of Tennessee in Knoxville, Tennessee, were led by head coach Pat Summitt, in her 10th season at the school. Tennessee opened the season ranked No. 5 in the AP poll. Playing one of the toughest schedules in the country, a program trademark, the Lady Volunteers saw their ranking slowing decline through the season and landed at No. 15 in the final poll.

In the NCAA tournament, Tennessee defeated Middle Tennessee State, Alabama, and No. 3 Georgia to reach their second NCAA Final Four in three seasons. They won 82–73 over No. 9 Cheyney State in the national semifinal to reach the national championship game with a 23–9 record.

=== USC Trojans ===
The Trojans, represented the University of Southern California in Los Angeles, California, were led by head coach Linda Sharp in her 7th season at the school. They began last season's title defense ranked No. 1 in the AP Poll, a spot they would hold for the first seven rankings. After losing three games in a 5-day span, to No. 6 Texas, No. 2 Louisiana Tech, and No. 7 Old Dominion, the team fell to No. 5. USC would peak at the No. 3 spot for five straight weeks before falling back to No. 5 – after a loss to No. 6 Long Beach State – for the final two polls of the season.

USC was the top seed in the West region of the NCAA tournament and defeated BYU, Montana, and Long Beach State to reach their second straight Final Four. In a rematch of the 1983 National championship game, the Trojans avenged a midseason loss and defeated No. 2 Louisiana Tech, 62–57, to move to 28–4 and set up the championship game matchup with the Lady Vols.

== Starting lineups ==
Tennessee	Position	USC
	G	Juliette Robinson
Lynne Collins	G	Amy Alkek
	F	Pamela McGee
Mary Ostrowski	F	Paula McGee
Tanya Haave	F	Cheryl Miller

== Game summary ==
CBS

April 1, 1984

No. 15 Tennessee Lady Volunteers 61, No. 5 USC Trojans 72
Scoring by half: 28–26, 33–46
Pts: 20; Rebs: 11; Asts:	Pts: Miller 27; Rebs: Asts:

Pauley Pavilion – Los Angeles, California

== Media coverage ==
The game was broadcast on CBS.
