= Naismith College Player of the Year =

Annual college basketball player award

- Awarded for: the most outstanding male and female basketball players in NCAA Division I
- Country: United States
- Presented by: Atlanta Tipoff Club

History
- First award: 1969 (men); 1983 (women)
- Most recent: Cameron Boozer, Duke (men); Sarah Strong, UConn (women)
- Website: Official website

The Naismith College Player of the Year is "the most prestigious national award presented annually to the men's and women's college basketball players of the year," as chosen by the Atlanta Tipoff Club's Board of Selectors. It is named in honor of James Naismith, the inventor of basketball.

== History and selection ==
First awarded exclusively to male players in 1969, the award was expanded to include female players in 1983. Annually before the college season begins in November, a "watchlist" consisting of 50 players is chosen by the Atlanta Tipoff Club board of selectors, comprising head coaches, administrators and media members from across the United States. By February, the list of nominees is narrowed down to 30 players based on performance. In March, four out of the 30 players are selected as finalists and are placed in the final ballot. The final winners are selected in April by both the board of selectors and fan voting via text messaging. The winners receive the Naismith Trophy.

Three award winners, two men and one woman, were born in United States territories:

- Alfred "Butch" Lee, who was born in the Commonwealth of Puerto Rico, and
- Tim Duncan and Aliyah Boston, both born in the U.S. Virgin Islands.

The only award winners who have been born outside the jurisdiction of the United States were:

- Andrew Bogut, born in Melbourne, Australia.
- Patrick Ewing, born in Kingston, Jamaica.
- Buddy Hield, born in Freeport, Bahamas.
- Oscar Tshiebwe, born in Lubumbashi, Democratic Republic of the Congo.
- Zach Edey, born in Toronto, Ontario, Canada.
- Sarah Strong, born in Madrid, Spain

Six of these players were developed at least partially in the U.S. proper—Lee was raised in Harlem from early childhood; Ewing immigrated to the Boston area at age 12; Boston moved to Worcester, Massachusetts at the same age; Hield attended high school in suburban Wichita, Kansas; Tshiebwe attended high schools in southwestern Virginia and western Pennsylvania; and Edey spent his last two high school years in Florida. Duncan did not move to the U.S. proper until he arrived at Wake Forest University, and Bogut lived in Australia until his arrival at the University of Utah.

Through 2025–26, Duke has the most male winners with 10, while UConn has the most female winners, with twelve awards won by eight individuals. The award has been won by a freshman six times: Kevin Durant (Texas, 2007), Anthony Davis (Kentucky, 2012), Zion Williamson (Duke, 2019), Paige Bueckers (UConn, 2021), Cooper Flagg (Duke, 2025), and Cameron Boozer (Duke, 2026).

== Key ==
Player (X)	Denotes the number of times the player has been awarded the Naismith Player of the Year Award at that point

== Winners ==
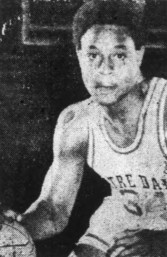
Austin Carr, Notre Dame, 1971

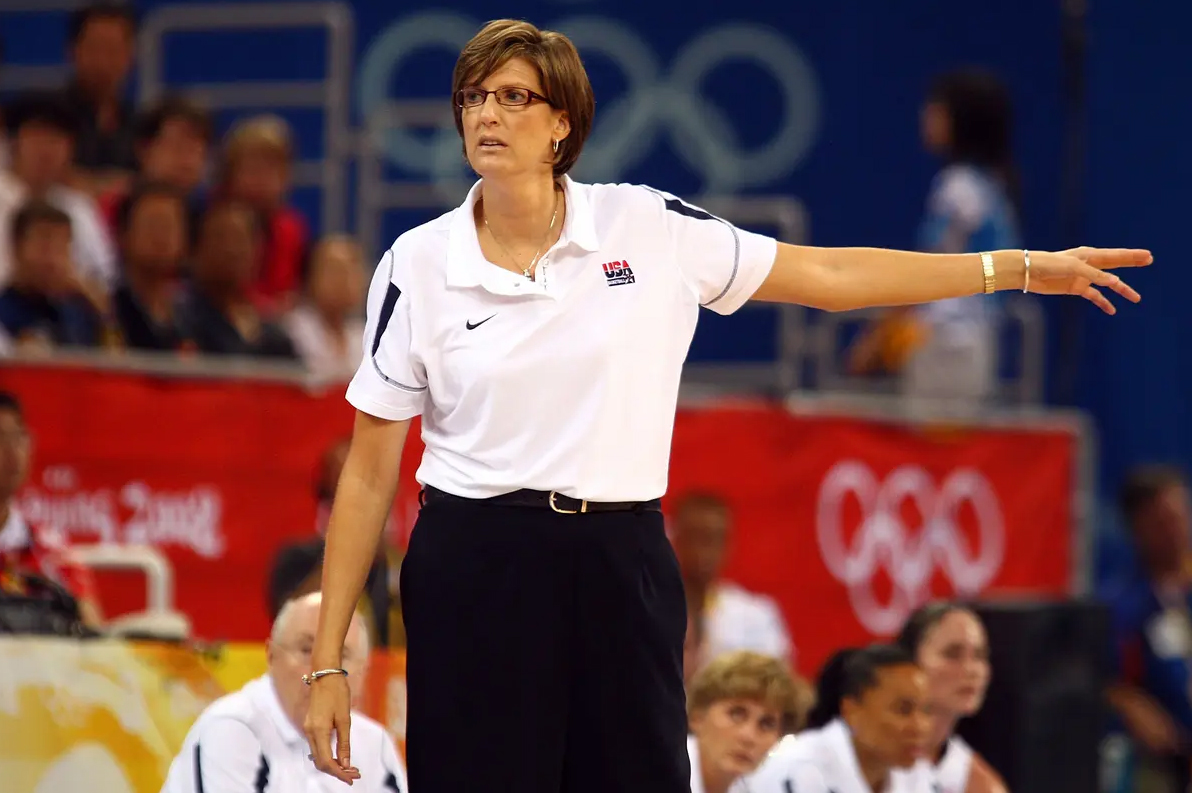
Anne Donovan, Old Dominion, 1983

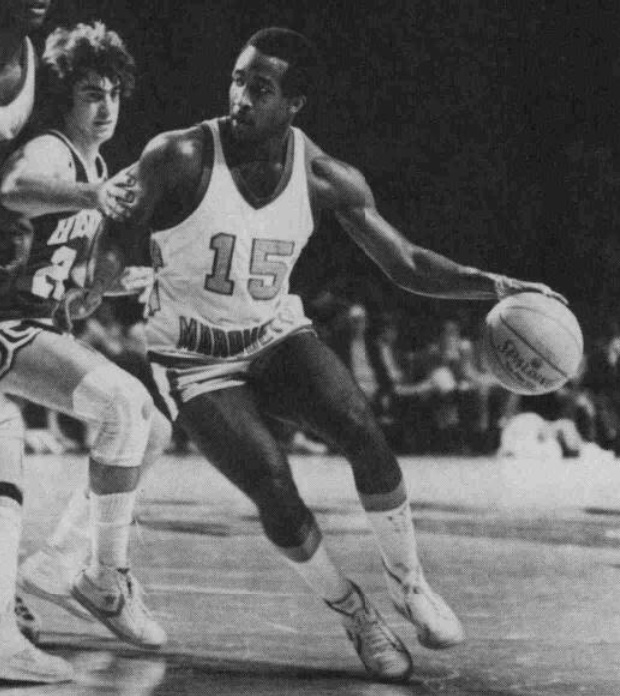
Butch Lee, Marquette, 1978

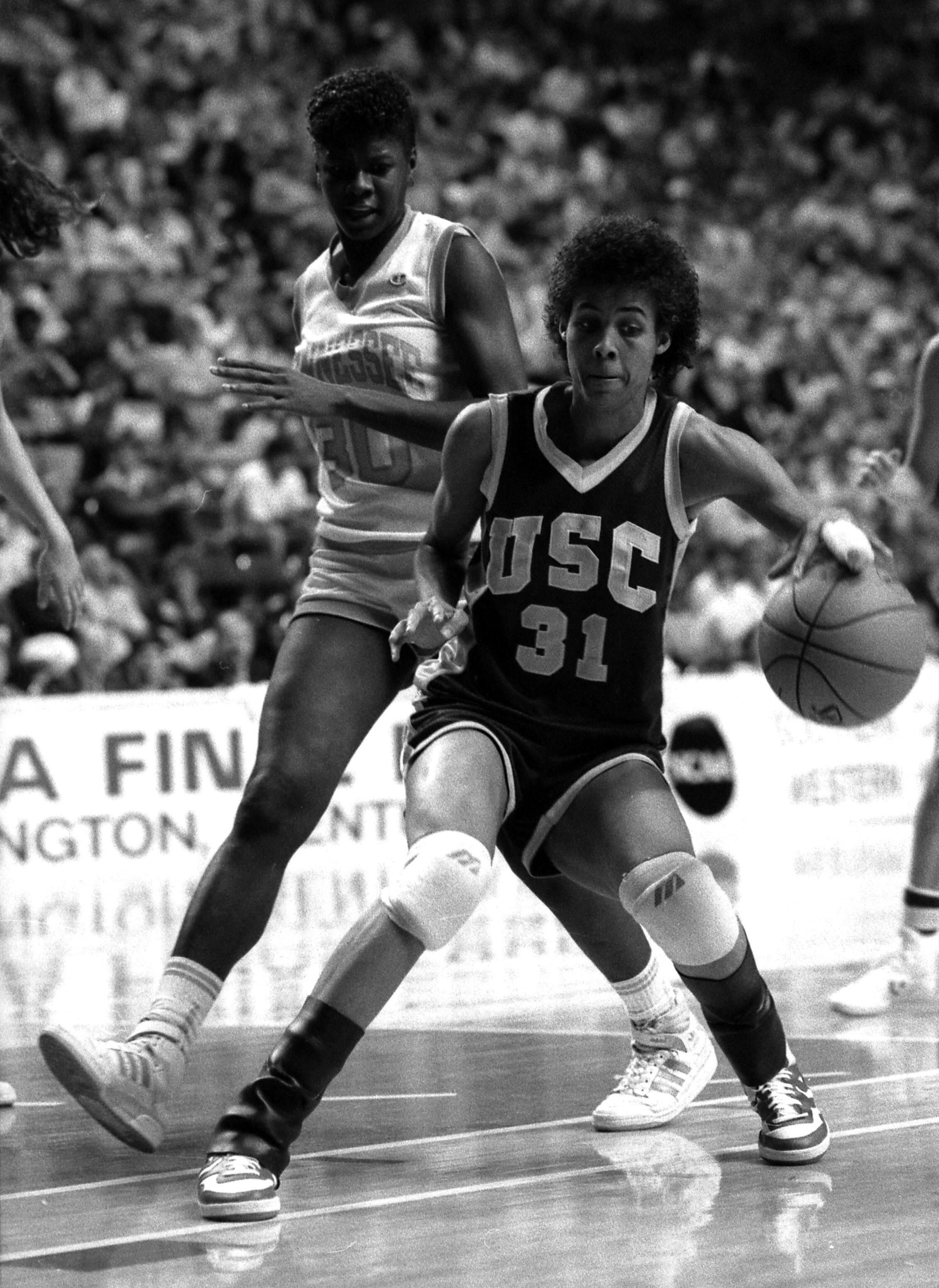
Cheryl Miller, USC, 1984 through 1986

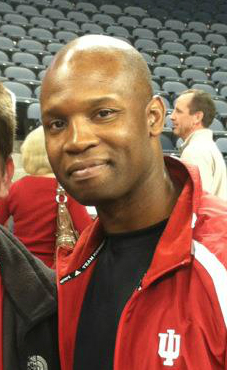
Calbert Cheaney, Indiana, 1993

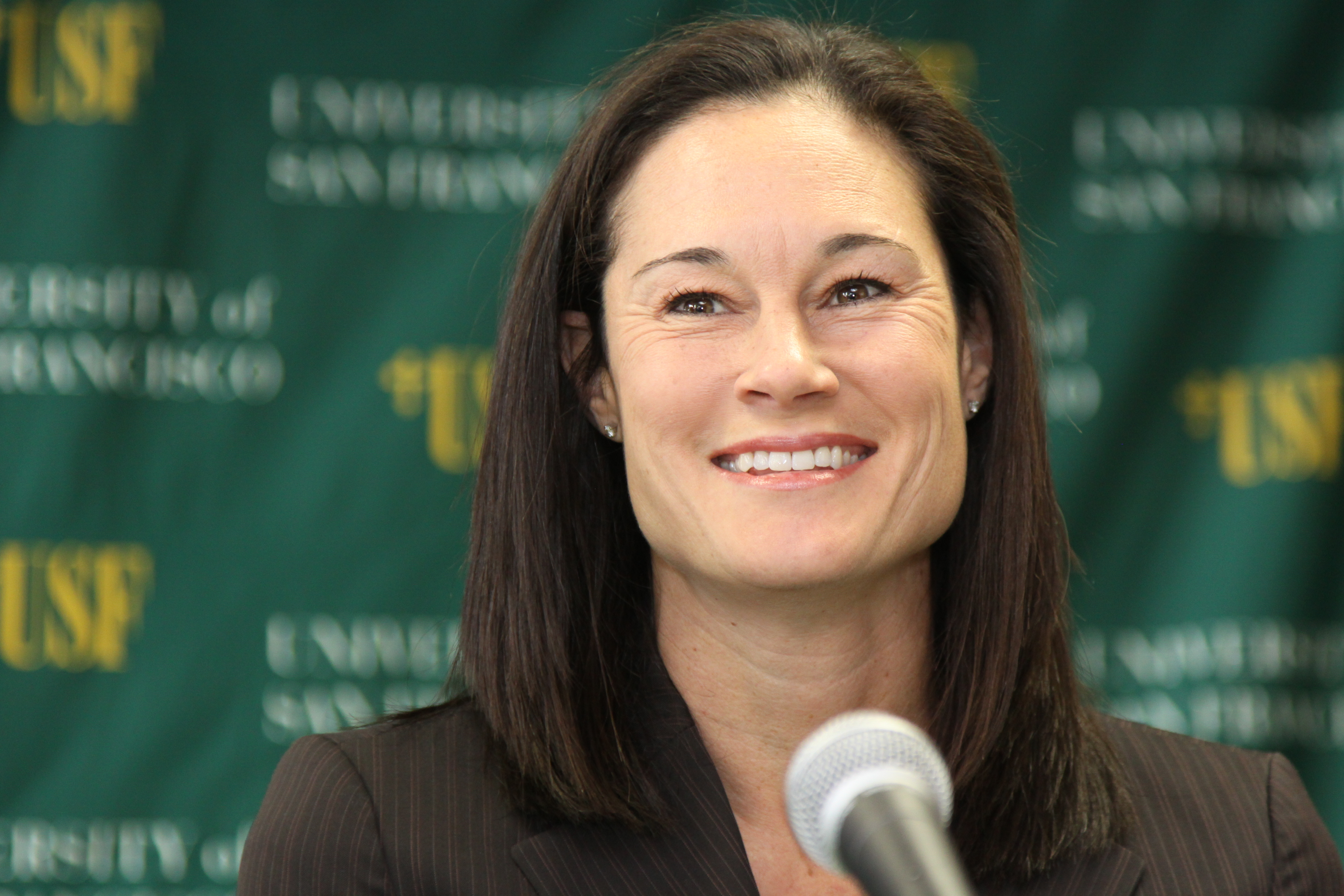
Jennifer Azzi, Stanford, 1990

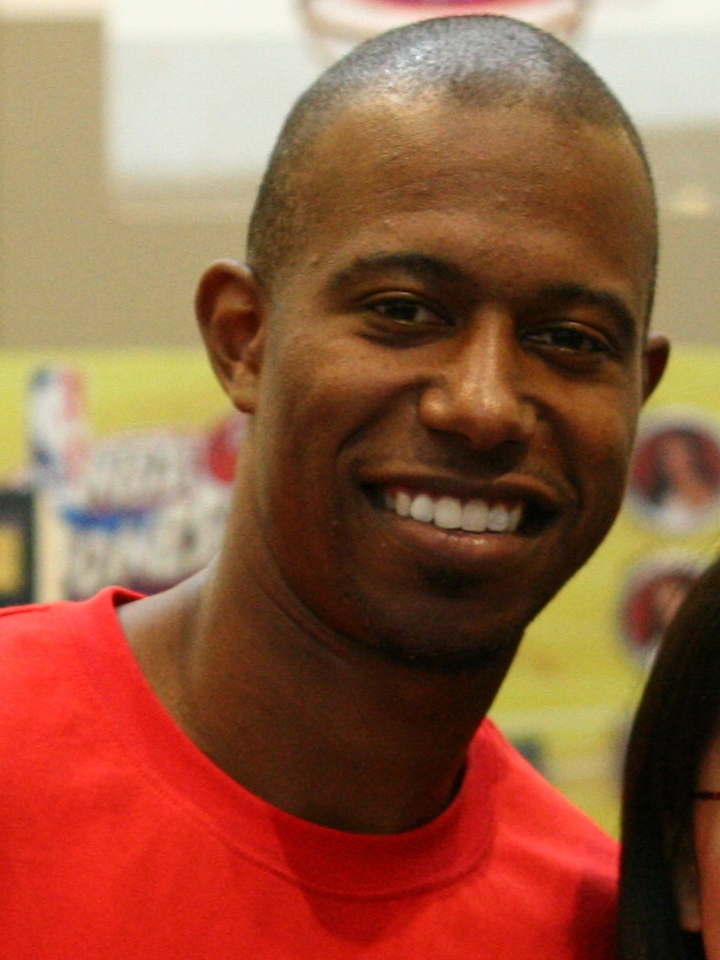
T. J. Ford, Texas, 2003

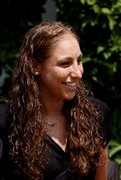
Diana Taurasi, UConn, 2003 and 2004

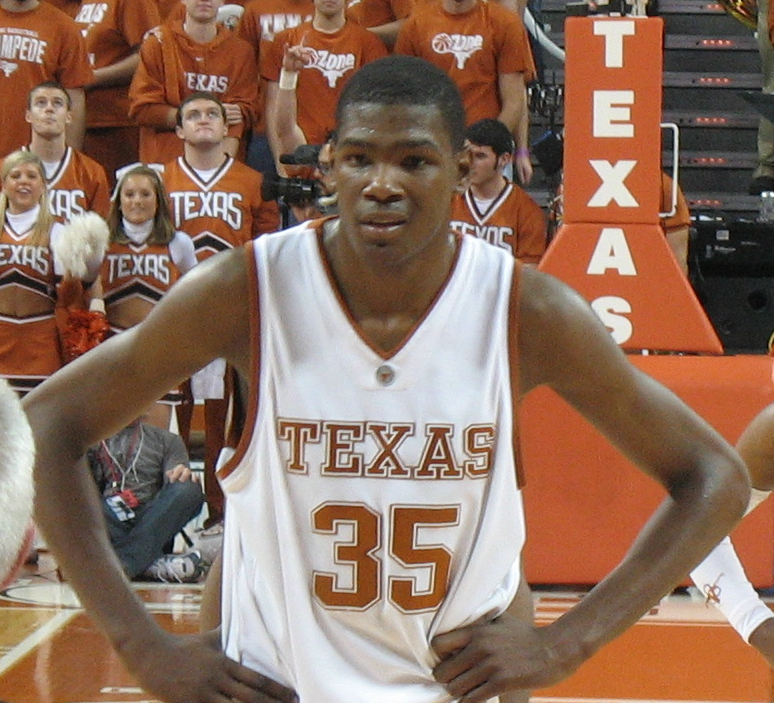
Kevin Durant, Texas, 2007

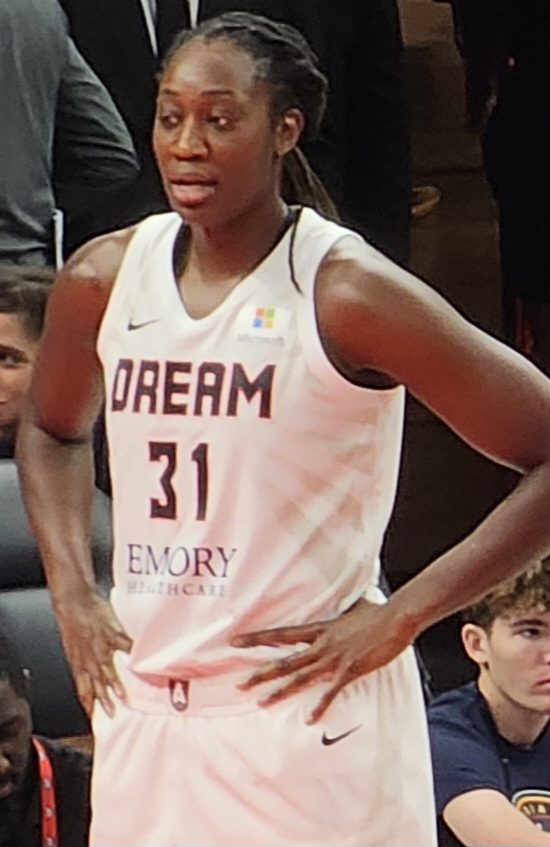
Tina Charles, UConn, 2010

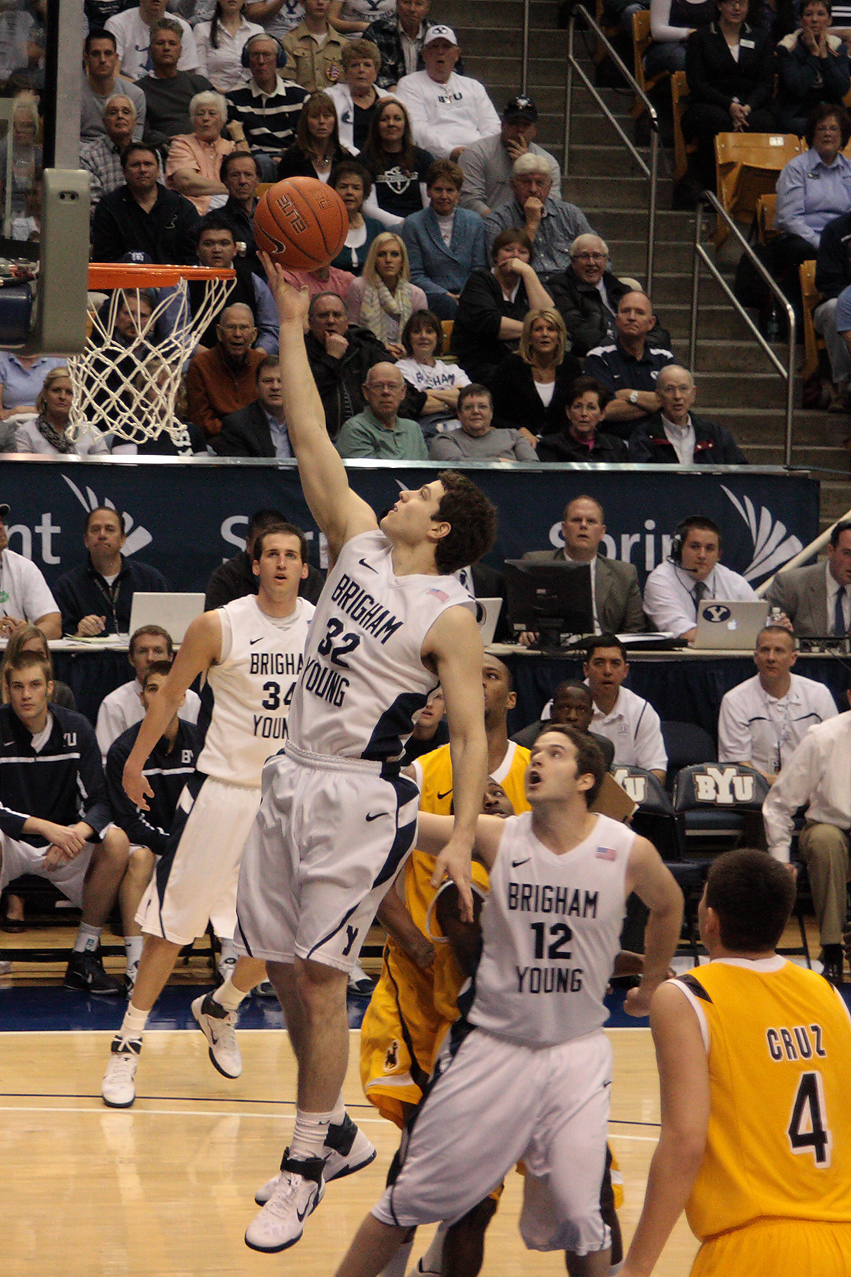
Jimmer Fredette, BYU, 2011

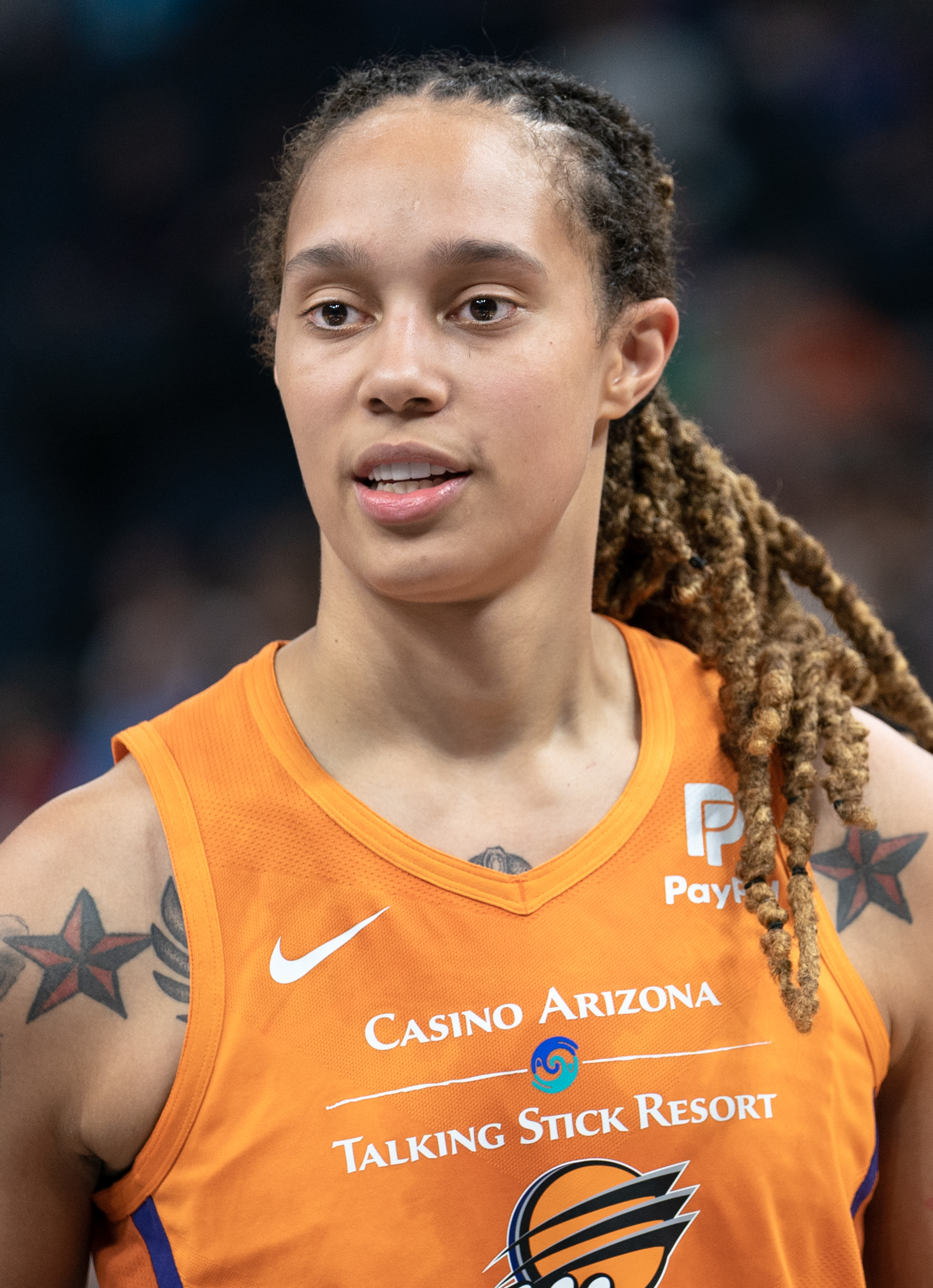
Brittney Griner, Baylor, 2012 and 2013

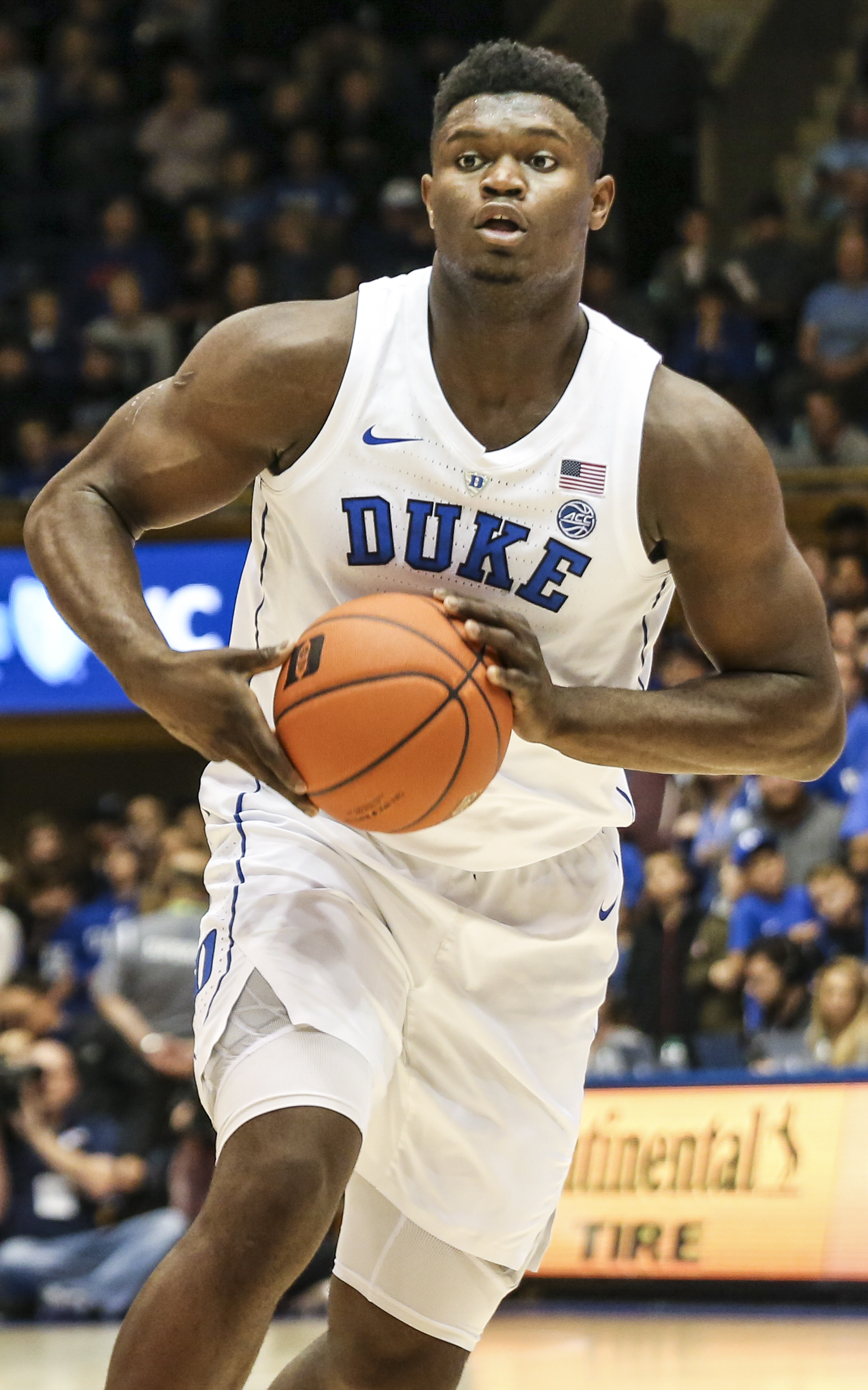
Zion Williamson, Duke, 2019

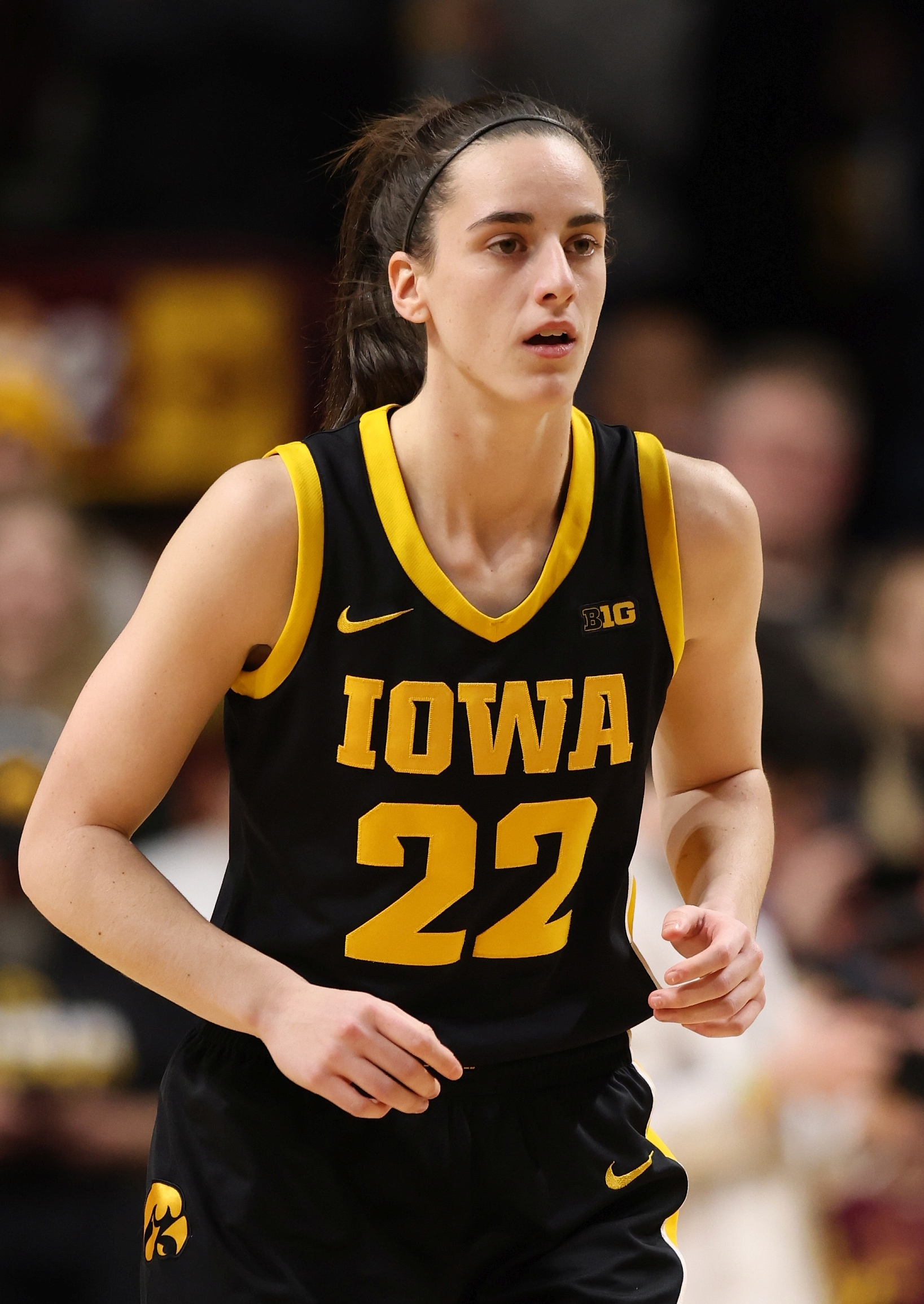
Caitlin Clark, Iowa, 2023 and 2024

Men
Season	Player	School	Position	Class	Reference
1968–69	Lew Alcindor^{[a]}	UCLA	C	Senior	
1969–70	Pete Maravich	LSU	PG	Senior	
1970–71	Austin Carr	Notre Dame	SG	Senior	
1971–72	Bill Walton	UCLA	C	Sophomore	
1972–73	Bill Walton (2)	UCLA	C	Junior	
1973–74	Bill Walton (3)	UCLA	C	Senior	
1974–75	David Thompson	NC State	SG / SF	Senior	
1975–76	Scott May	Indiana	SF	Senior	
1976–77	Marques Johnson	UCLA	G / F	Senior	
1977–78	Butch Lee	Marquette	PG	Senior	
1978–79	Larry Bird	Indiana State	SF	Senior	
1979–80	Mark Aguirre	DePaul	SF	Sophomore	
1980–81	Ralph Sampson	Virginia	C	Sophomore	
1981–82	Ralph Sampson (2)	Virginia	C	Junior	
1982–83	Ralph Sampson (3)	Virginia	C	Senior	
1983–84	Michael Jordan	North Carolina	SG	Junior	
1984–85	Patrick Ewing	Georgetown	C	Senior	
1985–86	Johnny Dawkins	Duke	PG	Senior	
1986–87	David Robinson	Navy	C	Senior	
1987–88	Danny Manning	Kansas	PF	Senior	
1988–89	Danny Ferry	Duke	PF / SF	Senior	
1989–90	Lionel Simmons	La Salle	SF	Senior	
1990–91	Larry Johnson	UNLV	PF	Senior	
1991–92	Christian Laettner	Duke	PF / C	Senior	
1992–93	Calbert Cheaney	Indiana	SF	Senior	
1993–94	Glenn Robinson	Purdue	SF	Junior	
1994–95	Joe Smith	Maryland	PF	Sophomore	
1995–96	Marcus Camby	UMass	C	Junior	
1996–97	Tim Duncan	Wake Forest	C	Senior	
1997–98	Antawn Jamison	North Carolina	SF	Junior	
1998–99	Elton Brand	Duke	C	Sophomore	
1999–00	Kenyon Martin	Cincinnati	F	Senior	
2000–01	Shane Battier	Duke	PF	Senior	
2001–02	Jason Williams	Duke	PG	Junior	
2002–03	T. J. Ford	Texas	PG	Sophomore	
2003–04	Jameer Nelson	Saint Joseph's	PG	Senior	
2004–05	Andrew Bogut	Utah	C	Sophomore	
2005–06	JJ Redick	Duke	SG	Senior	
2006–07	Kevin Durant	Texas	SF	Freshman	
2007–08	Tyler Hansbrough	North Carolina	PF	Junior	
2008–09	Blake Griffin	Oklahoma	PF	Sophomore	
2009–10	Evan Turner	Ohio State	SF	Junior	
2010–11	Jimmer Fredette	BYU	PG / SG	Senior	
2011–12	Anthony Davis	Kentucky	C	Freshman	
2012–13	Trey Burke	Michigan	PG	Sophomore	
2013–14	Doug McDermott	Creighton	SF	Senior	
2014–15	Frank Kaminsky	Wisconsin	PF	Senior	
2015–16	Buddy Hield	Oklahoma	SG	Senior	
2016–17	Frank Mason III	Kansas	PG	Senior	
2017–18	Jalen Brunson	Villanova	PG	Junior	
2018–19	Zion Williamson	Duke	PF	Freshman	
2019–20	Obi Toppin	Dayton	PF	Sophomore	
2020–21	Luka Garza	Iowa	C	Senior	
2021–22	Oscar Tshiebwe	Kentucky	C	Junior	
2022–23	Zach Edey	Purdue	C	Junior	
2023–24	Zach Edey (2)	Purdue	C	Senior	
2024–25	Cooper Flagg	Duke	SG / SF	Freshman	
2025–26	Cameron Boozer	Duke	PF	Freshman	

Women
Season	Player	School	Position	Class	Reference
1968–69	No award				
1969–70	No award				
1970–71	No award				
1971–72	No award				
1972–73	No award				
1973–74	No award				
1974–75	No award				
1975–76	No award				
1976–77	No award				
1977–78	No award				
1978–79	No award				
1979–80	No award				
1980–81	No award				
1981–82	No award				
1982–83	Anne Donovan	Old Dominion	C	Senior	
1983–84	Cheryl Miller	USC	SF	Sophomore	
1984–85	Cheryl Miller (2)	USC	SF	Junior	
1985–86	Cheryl Miller (3)	USC	SF	Senior	
1986–87	Clarissa Davis	Texas	F	Sophomore	
1987–88	Sue Wicks	Rutgers	F	Senior	
1988–89	Clarissa Davis (2)	Texas	F	Senior	
1989–90	Jennifer Azzi	Stanford	PG	Senior	
1990–91	Dawn Staley	Virginia	PG	Junior	
1991–92	Dawn Staley (2)	Virginia	PG	Senior	
1992–93	Sheryl Swoopes	Texas Tech	SG / SF	Senior	
1993–94	Lisa Leslie	USC	C	Senior	
1994–95	Rebecca Lobo	UConn	C	Senior	
1995–96	Saudia Roundtree	Georgia	G	Senior	
1996–97	Kate Starbird	Stanford	SG / SF	Senior	
1997–98	Chamique Holdsclaw	Tennessee	SF	Junior	
1998–99	Chamique Holdsclaw (2)	Tennessee	SF	Senior	
1999–00	Tamika Catchings	Tennessee	SF	Junior	
2000–01	Ruth Riley	Notre Dame	C	Senior	
2001–02	Sue Bird	UConn	PG	Senior	
2002–03	Diana Taurasi	UConn	PG / SG	Junior	
2003–04	Diana Taurasi (2)	UConn	PG / SG	Senior	
2004–05	Seimone Augustus	LSU	SG / SF	Junior	
2005–06	Seimone Augustus (2)	LSU	SG / SF	Senior	
2006–07	Lindsey Harding	Duke	PG	Senior	
2007–08	Candace Parker	Tennessee	PF	Senior	
2008–09	Maya Moore	UConn	PF	Sophomore	
2009–10	Tina Charles	UConn	C	Senior	
2010–11	Maya Moore (2)	UConn	PF	Senior	
2011–12	Brittney Griner	Baylor	C	Junior	
2012–13	Brittney Griner (2)	Baylor	C	Senior	
2013–14	Breanna Stewart	UConn	PF	Sophomore	
2014–15	Breanna Stewart (2)	UConn	PF	Junior	
2015–16	Breanna Stewart (3)	UConn	PF	Senior	
2016–17	Kelsey Plum	Washington	PG	Senior	
2017–18	A'ja Wilson	South Carolina	C	Senior	
2018–19	Megan Gustafson	Iowa	PF / C	Senior	
2019–20	Sabrina Ionescu	Oregon	PG	Senior	
2020–21	Paige Bueckers	UConn	PG	Freshman	
2021–22	Aliyah Boston	South Carolina	PF / C	Junior	
2022–23	Caitlin Clark	Iowa	PG	Junior	
2023–24	Caitlin Clark (2)	Iowa	PG	Senior	
2024–25	JuJu Watkins	USC	SG	Sophomore	
2025–26	Sarah Strong	UConn	SF	Sophomore	

- ^{a} Lew Alcindor changed his name to Kareem Abdul-Jabbar in 1971 after converting to Islam.

== See also ==
- List of U.S. men's college basketball national player of the year awards
- Naismith College Coach of the Year
