= 1983–84 Tennessee Lady Volunteers basketball team =

Intercollegiate basketball season

1983–84 Tennessee Lady Volunteers basketball

NCAA tournament, Runner-up
- Conference: Southeastern Conference

Ranking
- AP: No. 15
- Record: 23–10 (7–1 SEC)
- Head coach: Pat Summitt (10th season)
- Assistant coach: Nancy Darsch
- Home arena: Stokely Athletic Center

1983–84 SEC women's basketball standings
	Conf.				Overall
Team	W		L	PCT	W		L	PCT
Eastern Division
No. 3 Georgia †	7	–	1	.875	30	–	3	.909
No. 15 Tennessee	7	–	1	.875	23	–	10	.697
Vanderbilt	2	–	6	.250	23	–	9	.719
Florida	2	–	6	.250	19	–	9	.679
Kentucky	2	–	6	.250	15	–	13	.536
Western Division
No. 10 Ole Miss	6	–	2	.750	24	–	6	.800
No. 8 LSU	5	–	3	.625	23	–	7	.767
No. 12 Alabama	5	–	3	.625	23	–	9	.719
Auburn	4	–	4	.500	19	–	10	.655
Mississippi State	0	–	8	.000	12	–	14	-
† 1984 SEC tournament winner Rankings from AP poll

The 1983–84 Tennessee Lady Volunteers basketball team represented the University of Tennessee as a member of the Southeastern Conference during the 1983–84 women's college basketball season. Coached by Pat Summitt, the Lady Volunteers finished 23–10 and ranked No. 15 in the final poll, and reached the second NCAA Final Four in their rich program history.

== Roster ==
1983–84 Tennessee Lady Volunteers women's basketball team
Players
Coaches

Pos.	#	Name	Height	Year	Previous school	Hometown
G	10	Pam Marr	5 ft 6 in (1.68 m)	So		Winter Park, Florida
F	14	Mary Ostrowski	6 ft 2 in (1.88 m)	Sr		Parkersburg, West Virginia
G	15	Kristie Snyder	5 ft 6 in (1.68 m)	So		Knoxville, Tennessee
G	23	Shelley Sexton	5 ft 7 in (1.7 m)	Fr		Lake City, Tennessee
G	24	Pat Hatmaker	5 ft 8 in (1.73 m)	Sr		Knoxville, Tennessee
G	30	Shelia Collins	5 ft 9 in (1.75 m)	Jr		Colbert, Georgia
F	34	Lisa Webb	5 ft 9 in (1.75 m)	Fr		Milledgeville, Georgia
F	35	Linda Ray	5 ft 9 in (1.75 m)	Jr		Norris, Tennessee
G	40	Lynne Collins	6 ft 0 in (1.83 m)	Sr		Blacksburg, Virginia
F	42	Valerie Freeman	6 ft 0 in (1.83 m)	Fr		Milledgeville, Georgia
C	44	Cheryl Littlejohn	6 ft 3 in (1.91 m)	Fr		Gastonia, North Carolina
F	45	Tanya Haave	6 ft 2 in (1.88 m)	Sr		Evergreen, Colorado
F	51	Sonya Cannon	5 ft 8 in (1.73 m)	Sr		Maryville, Tennessee
F	53	Amy Gamble	5 ft 10 in (1.78 m)	Fr		Glen Dale, West Virginia
C	55	Paula Towns	6 ft 1 in (1.85 m)	Sr	Peach County	Fort Valley, Georgia

Head coach

- Pat Summitt

Assistant coach(es)

- Nancy Darsch

Legend

- (C) Team captain
- (S) Suspended
- (I) Ineligible
- (W) Walk-on
- Injured
- Current redshirt

Roster

== Schedule and results ==
Date time, TV	Rank^{#}	Opponent^{#}	Result	Record	Site city, state
Regular season
Nov 19, 1983*	No. 5	at West Virginia	W 52–47	1–0	Parkersburg, West Virginia
Nov 22, 1983*	No. 5	South Carolina State	W 85–69	2–0	Stokely Athletic Center; Knoxville, Tennessee
Nov 25, 1983*	No. 5	at Notre Dame; Notre Dame Thanksgiving Classic	W 71–56	3–0	Joyce Center; South Bend, Indiana
Nov 26, 1983*	No. 5	vs. No. 1 USC; Notre Dame Thanksgiving Classic	L 64–78	3–1	Joyce Center; South Bend, Indiana
Nov 29, 1983*	No. 5	No. 11 Old Dominion	W 67–63	4–1	Stokely Athletic Center; Knoxville, Tennessee
Dec 1, 1983*	No. 5	No. 4 Texas	L 65–66	4–2	Stokely Athletic Center; Knoxville, Tennessee
Dec 4, 1983*	No. 5	Minnesota	W 54–50	5–2	Stokely Athletic Center; Knoxville, Tennessee
Dec 8, 1983*	No. 7	at No. 1 USC	L 66–81	5–3	L.A. Sports Arena; Los Angeles, California
Dec 10, 1983*	No. 7	at UCLA	W 73–70	6–3	Pauley Pavilion; Los Angeles, California
Dec 13, 1983*	No. 9	at No. 5 Long Beach State	L 51–56	6–4	Gold Mine; Long Beach, California
Jan 18, 1984*	No. 12	No. 1 Louisiana Tech	L 63–81	10–6	Stokely Athletic Center; Knoxville, Tennessee
Jan 22, 1984	No. 12	No. 4 Georgia	W 64–59	11–6 (2–0)	Stokely Athletic Center; Knoxville, Tennessee
Feb 26, 1984	No. 10	Vanderbilt	W 74–72	19–8 (7–1)	Stokely Athletic Center; Knoxville, Tennessee
SEC tournament
Mar 3, 1984*	No. 10	vs. No. 17 Alabama; Quarterfinals	L 66–85	19–9	Stegeman Coliseum; Athens, Georgia
NCAA tournament
Mar 18, 1984*	(3 ME) No. 15	(6 ME) Middle Tennessee State; First round	W 70–52	20–9	Stokely Athletic Center; Knoxville, Tennessee
Mar 23, 1984*	(3 ME) No. 15	(2 ME) No. 10 Alabama; Regional Semifinal – Sweet Sixteen	W 65–58	21–9	Stokely Athletic Center; Knoxville, Tennessee
Mar 25, 1984*	(3 ME) No. 15	(1 ME) No. 3 Georgia; Regional Final – Elite Eight	W 73–61	22–9	Stokely Athletic Center; Knoxville, Tennessee
Mar 30, 1984*	(3 ME) No. 15	vs. (3 E) No. 9 Cheyney State; National Semifinal – Final Four	W 82–73	23–9	Pauley Pavilion; Los Angeles, California
Apr 1, 1984*	(3 ME) No. 15	vs. (1 W) No. 5 USC; National Championship	L 61–72	23–10	Pauley Pavilion; Los Angeles, California
*Non-conference game. ^{#}Rankings from AP Poll. (#) Tournament seedings in parentheses. ME=Mideast.
