= USC Women's Basketball =

USC women's basketball may refer to:

- South Carolina Gamecocks women's basketball, the collegiate women's basketball program of the University of South Carolina (often referred to as "SC" or "USC" in athletics)
- USC Trojans women's basketball, the collegiate women's basketball program of the University of Southern California
