= 1983–84 Louisiana Tech Lady Techsters basketball team =

1983-84 Louisiana Tech women's basketball season

1983–84 Louisiana Tech Lady Techsters basketball

NCAA tournament, Final Four
- Conference: Independent

Ranking
- AP: No. 2
- Record: 30–3
- Head coach: Sonja Hogg (10th season); Leon Barmore
- Assistant coach: Gary Blair
- Home arena: Thomas Assembly Center

The 1983–84 Louisiana Tech Lady Techsters basketball team represented Louisiana Tech University during the 1983–84 NCAA Division I women's basketball season. The team was led by co-head coaches Sonja Hogg and Leon Barmore, who guided the team to a 30–3 record and a third straight NCAA Final Four appearance at the 1984 NCAA tournament. After winning the inaugural NCAA title in 1982, the Lady Techsters lost to the eventual National champion, USC, for the season time in a row. This was the program's third consecutive appearance in the NCAA Final Four. The team played their home games at the Thomas Assembly Center in Ruston, Louisiana as an NCAA independent.

== Roster ==
1983–84 Louisiana Tech Lady Techsters women's basketball team
Players
Coaches

Pos.	#	Name	Height	Year	Hometown
G	20	Kim Mulkey	5 ft 4 in (1.63 m)	Sr	Hammond, Louisiana
G	22	Pam Gant	5 ft 7 in (1.7 m)	Jr
F		Pam Crawford	5 ft 7 in (1.7 m)	Sr
F	44	Debra Rodman	6 ft 2 in (1.88 m)	Sr	Dallas, Texas
C	51	Janice Lawrence	6 ft 3 in (1.91 m)	Sr	Lucedale, Mississippi

Head coach

- Sonja Hogg
- Leon Barmore

Assistant coach(es)

- Gary Blair

Legend

- (C) Team captain
- (S) Suspended
- (I) Ineligible
- (W) Walk-on
- Injured
- Current redshirt

== Schedule and results ==
Date time, TV	Rank^{#}	Opponent^{#}	Result	Record	Site (attendance) city, state
Regular season
Nov 29, 1983*	No. 2	at Arkansas	W 75–52	1–0	Barnhill Arena (2,632); Fayetteville, Arkansas
Nov 30, 1983*	No. 2	Mississippi College	W 109–60	2–0	Thomas Assembly Center (4,550); Ruston, Louisiana
Dec 2, 1983*	No. 2	No. 7 Kansas	W 103–71	3–0	Thomas Assembly Center (2,770); Ruston, Louisiana
Dec 3, 1983*	No. 2	No. 18 Western Kentucky	W 82–50	4–0	Thomas Assembly Center (3,610); Ruston, Louisiana
Dec 10, 1983*	No. 2	Indiana	W 76–47	5–0	Thomas Assembly Center (3,880); Ruston, Louisiana
Dec 12, 1983*	No. 2	at Northwestern State	W 82–46	6–0	Prather Coliseum (900); Natchitoches, Louisiana
Dec 17, 1983*	No. 2	vs. Ohio State	W 79–57	7–0	(1,000); Dallas, Texas
Jan 3, 1984*	No. 2	No. 1 USC	W 75–66	8–0	Thomas Assembly Center (8,370); Ruston, Louisiana
Jan 4, 1984*	No. 2	UCLA	W 94–58	9–0	Thomas Assembly Center (4,080); Ruston, Louisiana
Jan 6, 1984*	No. 1	No. 4 Long Beach State	W 73–57	10–0	Thomas Assembly Center (5,875); Ruston, Louisiana
Jan 12, 1984*	No. 1	Notre Dame	W 83–56	11–0	Thomas Assembly Center (4,325); Ruston, Louisiana
Jan 14, 1984*	No. 1	Northeast Louisiana	W 88–67	12–0	Thomas Assembly Center (8,825); Ruston, Louisiana
Jan 18, 1984*	No. 1	at No. 12 Tennessee	W 81–63	13–0	Stokely Athletic Center; Knoxville, Tennessee
Jan 20, 1984*	No. 1	vs. No. 10 Cheyney State	W 100–72	14–0	Rec Hall; University Park, Pennsylvania
Jan 21, 1984*	No. 1	at Penn State	W 86–61	15–0	Rec Hall; University Park, Pennsylvania
Jan 27, 1984*	No. 1	at Southeastern Louisiana	W 88–45	16–0	University Center (2,400); Hammond, Louisiana
Jan 28, 1984*	No. 1	UNLV	W 90–60	17–0	Thomas Assembly Center (4,715); Ruston, Louisiana
Feb 1, 1984*	No. 1	at Northeast Louisiana	W 86–72	18–0	Fant–Ewing Coliseum (7,543); Monroe, Louisiana
Feb 4, 1984*	No. 1	at No. 7 Old Dominion	L 64–66	18–1	Norfolk Scope; Norfolk, Virginia
Feb 6, 1984*	No. 1	at No. 13 Auburn	W 80–68	19–1	Beard–Eaves–Memorial Coliseum (1,550); Auburn, Alabama
Feb 10, 1984*	No. 1	at Jackson State	W 69–65	20–1	Williams Assembly Center (6,000); Jackson, Mississippi
Feb 11, 1984*	No. 1	at Memphis State	L 69–72	20–2	Memorial Fieldhouse (2,248); Memphis, Tennessee
Feb 16, 1984*	No. 2	at Stephen F. Austin	W 87–58	21–2	William R. Johnson Coliseum (1,300); Nacogdoches, Texas
Feb 18, 1984*	No. 2	Houston	W 92–58	22–2	Thomas Assembly Center (4,725); Ruston, Louisiana
Feb 21, 1984*	No. 2	Oral Roberts	W 98–61	23–2	Thomas Assembly Center (4,560); Ruston, Louisiana
Feb 25, 1984*	No. 2	at Cal Poly Pomona	W 83–43	24–2	Kellogg Arena (1,216); Pomona, California
Feb 28, 1984*	No. 2	at Hawaii	W 95–53	25–2	Stan Sheriff Center (343); Honolulu, Hawaii
Feb 29, 1984*	No. 2	at Hawaii Pacific	W 97–51	26–2	Neal S. Blaisdell Center (150); Honolulu, Hawaii
Mar 10, 1984*	No. 2	at McNeese State	W 87–43	27–2	Memorial Gymnasium (1,000); Lake Charles, Louisiana
NCAA tournament
Mar 16, 1984*	(1 MW) No. 2	(8 MW) Texas Tech; First Round	W 94–68	28–2	Thomas Assembly Center (5,170); Ruston, Louisiana
Mar 23, 1984*	(1 MW) No. 2	(5 MW) No. 8 LSU; Regional Semifinal – Sweet Sixteen	W 92–67	29–2	Thomas Assembly Center; Ruston, Louisiana
Mar 25, 1984*	(1 MW) No. 2	(2 MW) No. 1 Texas; Regional Final – Elite Eight	W 85–60	30–2	Thomas Assembly Center; Ruston, Louisiana
Mar 30, 1984*	(1 MW) No. 2	vs. (1 W) No. 5 USC; National Semifinal – Final Four	L 57–62	30–3	Pauley Pavilion; Los Angeles, California
*Non-conference game. ^{#}Rankings from AP Poll. (#) Tournament seedings in parentheses. MW=Midwest. All times are in Central.

== Rankings ==
Ranking movements Legend: ██ Increase in ranking ██ Decrease in ranking
	Week																
Poll	1	2	3	4	5	6	7	8	9	10	11	12	13	14	15	16	Final
AP	2	2	2	2	2	2	2	1	1	1	1	1	2	2	2	2	2

== Awards and honors ==
- Kim Mulkey – Frances Pomeroy Naismith Award
