= 1983–84 NCAA Division I women's basketball rankings =

- Season: 1983–84
- NCAA Tournament: 1984
- Preseason No. 1: USC
- NCAA Tournament Champions: USC
NCAA Division I women's basketball rankings
| |

A single human poll represents the 1983–84 NCAA Division I women's basketball rankings, the AP Poll, in addition to various publications' preseason polls.

The AP poll was initially a poll of coaches conducted via telephone, where coaches identified top teams and a list of the Top 20 team was produced. The contributors continued to be coaches until 1994, when the AP took over administration of the poll from Mel Greenberg, and switched to a panel of writers. The AP poll is currently a poll of sportswriters. The AP conducts polls weekly through the end of the regular season and conference play.

== Legend ==
| – | Not ranked |
| (#) | Ranking |

== AP Poll ==
| Team | 18-Nov | 27-Nov | 4-Dec | 11-Dec | 18-Dec | 25-Dec | 1-Jan | 8-Jan | 15-Jan | 22-Jan | 29-Jan | 5-Feb | 12-Feb | 19-Feb | 26-Feb | 4-Mar | 11-Mar |
|---|---|---|---|---|---|---|---|---|---|---|---|---|---|---|---|---|---|
| Southern California | 1 | 1 | 1 | 1 | 1 | 1 | 1 | 5 | 4 | 3 | 3 | 3 | 3 | 3 | 3 | 5 | 5 |
| Louisiana Tech | 2 | 2 | 2 | 2 | 2 | 2 | 2 | 1 | 1 | 1 | 1 | 1 | 2 | 2 | 2 | 2 | 2 |
| Georgia | 3 | 3 | 3 | 3 | 3 | 3 | 3 | 2 | 2 | 4 | 4 | 4 | 4 | 4 | 4 | 3 | 3 |
| Long Beach St. | 6 | 6 | 5 | 5 | 4 | 4 | 4 | 7 | 8 | 6 | 6 | 6 | 8 | 7 | 6 | 6 | 6 |
| LSU | 13 | 13 | 11 | 10 | 9 | 7 | 5 | 6 | 7 | 9 | 8 | 9 | 10 | 9 | 9 | 8 | 8 |
| Texas | 4 | 4 | 4 | 4 | 5 | 8 | 6 | 3 | 3 | 2 | 2 | 2 | 1 | 1 | 1 | 1 | 1 |
| Old Dominion | 7 | 11 | 12 | 11 | 11 | 10 | 7 | 4 | 6 | 8 | 7 | 5 | 5 | 5 | 5 | 4 | 4 |
| Ole Miss | 10 | 8 | 9 | 8 | 8 | 6 | 8 | 9 | 5 | 5 | 5 | 8 | 7 | 6 | 8 | 11 | 10 |
| Maryland | 8 | 9 | 8 | 7 | 7 | 5 | 9 | 13 | 17 | 14 | 16 | 17 | 19 | 13 | 13 | 17 | 17 |
| Kansas St. | 9 | 7 | 6 | 6 | 6 | 9 | 10 | 10 | 9 | 7 | 11 | 10 | 12 | 11 | 11 | 7 | 7 |
| Tennessee | 5 | 5 | 7 | 9 | 10 | 11 | 11 | 8 | 12 | 11 | 9 | 7 | 6 | 10 | 10 | 14 | 15 |
| North Carolina St. | 11 | 10 | 14 | 13 | 13 | 13 | 12 | 16 | 16 | T20 | 19 | 16 | 13 | 15 | 16 | 16 | 16 |
| Rutgers | 14 | 14 | 13 | 12 | 12 | 12 | 13 | 18 | 20 | – | – | – | – | – | – | – | – |
| Auburn | 12 | 12 | 10 | 14 | 14 | 15 | 14 | 15 | 13 | 12 | 10 | 13 | 15 | 16 | 18 | – | – |
| Cheyney State | 19 | 20 | 20 | 20 | 19 | 20 | 15 | 12 | 10 | 13 | 12 | 11 | 14 | 12 | 12 | 10 | 9 |
| Missouri | 15 | 17 | 16 | 16 | 15 | 16 | 16 | 14 | 11 | 10 | 13 | 12 | 9 | 8 | 7 | 9 | 11 |
| Alabama | – | – | 18 | 17 | 16 | 14 | 17 | 11 | 15 | 19 | 20 | – | 20 | 20 | 17 | 12 | 12 |
| Clemson | – | 19 | 15 | 15 | 17 | 17 | 18 | 17 | 14 | 17 | 14 | 19 | 17 | – | T20 | – | – |
| Florida | – | – | – | – | – | 19 | 19 | – | – | – | – | – | – | – | – | – | – |
| Arizona St. | 16 | – | – | – | – | – | – | – | – | – | – | – | – | – | – | – | – |
| Chattanooga | – | – | – | – | – | – | – | – | – | – | – | – | – | 19 | 19 | 19 | 20 |
| Kentucky | – | – | – | – | 20 | – | – | – | – | – | – | – | – | – | – | – | – |
| La.-Monroe | – | – | – | – | – | – | – | – | – | – | – | 20 | 18 | 17 | 14 | 13 | 13 |
| North Carolina | – | – | – | – | – | – | – | – | – | 18 | 15 | 15 | 16 | 18 | – | 15 | 14 |
| Ohio St. | 18 | 16 | – | – | – | – | – | – | – | – | – | – | – | – | T20 | 20 | 19 |
| Penn St. | 17 | 15 | 19 | 18 | – | – | – | – | – | – | – | – | – | – | – | – | – |
| South Carolina | 20 | – | – | – | – | – | – | – | – | – | – | – | – | – | – | – | – |
| St. John’s (NY) | – | – | – | – | – | – | 20 | 19 | 18 | 15 | 18 | 18 | – | – | – | – | – |
| Vanderbilt | – | – | – | – | – | – | – | – | – | T20 | – | – | – | – | – | – | – |
| Virginia | – | – | – | 19 | 18 | 18 | – | 20 | 19 | 16 | 17 | 14 | 11 | 14 | 15 | 18 | 18 |
| Western Ky. | – | 18 | 17 | – | – | – | – | – | – | – | – | – | – | – | – | – | – |
