= 1983–84 Cheyney State Lady Wolves basketball team =

1983-84 Cheyney State Wolves women's basketball season

1983–84 Cheyney State Lady Wolves basketball

NCAA tournament, Final Four
- Conference: Independent

Ranking
- AP: No. 9
- Record: 25–5
- Head coach: Winthrop McGriff (2nd season)
- Assistant coaches: Carlotta Schaffer (5th season); Ann Hill
- Home arena: Cope Hall

The 1983–84 Cheyney State Lady Wolves basketball team represented Cheyney State College as an NCAA independent during the 1983–84 NCAA Division I women's basketball season. The team was led by second–year head coach Winthrop McGriff and played their home games at Cope Hall in Cheyney, Pennsylvania. The Lady Wolves earned a record of 25–5 and a No. 9 ranking, were invited to the NCAA tournament, and reached their second Final Four in three seasons.

To date, Cheyney State is the only HBCU to reach the NCAA women's Final Four – doing so twice. They played for the NCAA championship in 1982, finishing runner-up.

== Roster ==
1983–84 Cheyney Wolves women's basketball team
Players
Coaches

Pos.	#	Name	Height	Year	Hometown
G	3	Sandra Giddins	5 ft 6 in (1.68 m)	Sr	Yonkers, New York
G	10	Karen Draughn	5 ft 8 in (1.73 m)	Sr	New Haven, Connecticut
F/C	15	Ann Strong	6 ft 1 in (1.85 m)	Jr	Toledo, Ohio
C	34	Shay Taylor	6 ft 4 in (1.93 m)	Sr	Jersey City, New Jersey
G	41	Paulette Bigelow	5 ft 7 in (1.7 m)	Jr	East Orange, New Jersey
G/F	44	Yolanda Laney	5 ft 10 in (1.78 m)	Sr	Philadelphia, Pennsylvania
F	51	Rosetta Guilford	5 ft 9 in (1.75 m)	Sr	Newark, New Jersey

Head coach

- Winthrop McGriff

Assistant coach(es)

- Ann Hill
- Carlotta "Bunny" Schaffer

Legend

- (C) Team captain
- (S) Suspended
- (I) Ineligible
- (W) Walk-on
- Injured
- Current redshirt

== Schedule and results ==
Date time, TV	Rank^{#}	Opponent^{#}	Result	Record	Site (attendance) city, state
Regular season
Dec 14, 1983*	No. 20	No. 18 Penn State	W 96–75	–	Cope Hall; Cheyney, Pennsylvania
Dec 17, 1983*	No. 20	at No. 11 Old Dominion; Optimist Classic	L 68–86	–	Norfolk Scope; Norfolk, Virginia
Dec 18, 1983*	No. 20	vs. Duquesne; Optimist Classic	W 85–41	–	Norfolk Scope; Norfolk, Virginia
Jan 20, 1984*	No. 10	vs. No. 1 Louisiana Tech	L 72–100	–	Rec Hall; University Park, Pennsylvania
Feb 14, 1984*	No. 14	at Penn State	W 88–82	–	Rec Hall; University Park, Pennsylvania
Feb 25, 1984*	No. 12	at No. 13 Maryland	W 83–76	–	Cole Field House; College Park, Maryland
PSAC tournament
NCAA tournament
Mar 16, 1984*	(6 E) No. 17	(3 E) No. 9 Maryland; First round	W 92–64	23–4	Cope Hall; Cheyney, Pennsylvania
Mar 22, 1984*	(2 E) No. 14	vs. (3 E) No. 9 North Carolina; Regional Semifinal – Sweet Sixteen	W 73–72	24–4	Norfolk Scope; Norfolk, Virginia
Mar 24, 1984*	(1 E) No. 4	at (3 E) No. 9 Old Dominion; Regional Final – Elite Eight	W 80–71	25–4	Norfolk Scope; Norfolk, Virginia
Mar 30, 1984*	(3 ME) No. 15	vs. (3 E) No. 9 Tennessee; National Semifinal – Final Four	L 73–82	25–5	Pauley Pavilion; Los Angeles, California
*Non-conference game. ^{#}Rankings from AP Poll. (#) Tournament seedings in parentheses. E=East. All times are in Eastern.

== Rankings ==
Ranking movements Legend: ██ Increase in ranking ██ Decrease in ranking
	Week																
Poll	1	2	3	4	5	6	7	8	9	10	11	12	13	14	15	16	Final
AP	19	20	20	20	19	20	15	12	10	13	12	11	14	12	12	10	9

== Awards and honors ==
- Yolanda Laney – All-American

== See also ==
- 1981–82 Cheyney State Lady Wolves basketball team
