= 1983–84 USC Trojans women's basketball team =

Intercollegiate basketball season

1983–84 USC Trojans women's basketball

NCAA tournament National champions WCAA co-champions
- Conference: Western Collegiate Athletic Association

Ranking
- AP: No. 5
- Record: 29–4 (13–1 WCAA)
- Head coach: Linda Sharp (7th season)
- Assistant coach: Kathy Ricks
- Home arena: L.A. Sports Arena

1983–84 West Coast Athletic Association women's basketball standings
	Conf.				Overall
Team	W		L	PCT	W		L	PCT
No. 5 USC	13	–	1	.929	29	–	4	.879
No. 6 Long Beach State	13	–	1	.929	25	–	6	.806
San Diego State	9	–	5	.643	24	–	6	.800
Cal State Fullerton	7	–	7	.500	17	–	11	.607
Arizona State	6	–	8	.429	17	–	11	.607
UCLA	6	–	8	.429	17	–	12	.586
Arizona	1	–	13	.071	8	–	20	.286
Stanford	1	–	13	.071	5	–	23	.179
As of April 2, 1984; Rankings from AP Poll

The 1983–84 USC Trojans women's basketball team represented the University of Southern California during the 1983–84 NCAA Division I women's basketball season. The squad was led by seventh-year head coach Linda Sharp and a talented roster of underclassmen. The Trojans played their home games at the L.A. Sports Arena and were members of the Western Collegiate Athletic Association.

The Women of Troy finished the regular season with a 24–4 record and the No. 5 ranking in the AP poll. As the top seed in the West region of the NCAA tournament, USC played the entire regional on their home court. The team defeated BYU, Montana, and Long Beach State to earn their second straight Final Four appearance. In the national semifinals, USC defeated Louisiana Tech, 62–57. In the National Championship Game, the Trojans played Tennessee, winning 71–62 to avenge a 1982 regional final loss and earn the program's second straight NCAA title.

== Previous season ==
The 1982–83 USC Trojans women's basketball team finished with an overall record of 31–2 and a No. 2 ranking in the final AP poll. They defeated No. 1 Louisiana Tech, 69–67, to win the women's NCAA tournament and the program's first NCAA title.

== Roster ==
1983–84 USC Trojans women's basketball team
Players
Coaches

Pos.	#	Name	Height	Year	Previous school	Hometown
F	11	Paula McGee	6 ft 3 in (1.91 m)	Jr	Flint Northern	Flint, Michigan
G	15	Juliette Robinson	5 ft 9 in (1.75 m)	Sr		Long Beach, California
G	21	Rhonda Windham (injured)	—	So	John F. Kennedy	Bronx, New York
G	22	M'Lis Ward	5 ft 8 in (1.73 m)	So	Whitney M. Young	Chicago, Illinois
F	30	Pamela McGee	6 ft 3 in (1.91 m)	Jr	Flint Northern	Flint, Michigan
F	31	Cheryl Miller	6 ft 2 in (1.88 m)	So	Riverside Polytechnic	Riverside, California
G	44	Cynthia Cooper	5 ft 10 in (1.78 m)	So	Locke	Los Angeles, California
G	50	Amy Alkek	5 ft 8 in (1.73 m)	Fr		Victoria, Texas

Head coach

- Linda Sharp (Cal State Fullerton)

Assistant coach(es)

- Kathy Ricks

Legend

- (C) Team captain
- (S) Suspended
- (I) Ineligible
- (W) Walk-on
- Injured
- Current redshirt

Roster

== Schedule ==
Date time, TV	Rank^{#}	Opponent^{#}	Result	Record	Site city, state
Regular season
Nov 25, 1983*	No. 1	vs. No. 8 Maryland; Notre Dame Thanksgiving Classic	W 86–68	1–0	Joyce Center; South Bend, Indiana
Nov 26, 1983*	No. 1	vs. No. 5 Tennessee; Notre Dame Thanksgiving Classic	W 78–64	2–0	Joyce Center; South Bend, Indiana
Nov 28, 1983*	No. 1	at Northwestern	W 67–65 ^{OT}	3–0	Welsh-Ryan Arena; Evanston, Illinois
Nov 30, 1983*	No. 1	at No. 17 Missouri	W 81–79	4–0	Hearnes Center; Columbia, Missouri
Dec 5, 1983*	No. 1	San Francisco	W 86–58	5–0	L.A. Sports Arena; Los Angeles, California
Dec 8, 1983*	No. 1	No. 7 Tennessee	W 81–66	6–0	L.A. Sports Arena; Los Angeles, California
Dec 15, 1983*	No. 1	No. 3 Georgia	W 82–74	7–0	L.A. Sports Arena; Los Angeles, California
Dec 23, 1983*	No. 1	Ohio State	W 102–73	8–0	L.A. Sports Arena; Los Angeles, California
Dec 29, 1983*	No. 1	Penn State; Winston Tire Classic	W 79–66	9–0	L.A. Sports Arena; Los Angeles, California
Dec 30, 1983*	No. 1	Oregon; Winston Tire Classic	W 91–57	10–0	L.A. Sports Arena; Los Angeles, California
Jan 2, 1984*	No. 1	at No. 6 Texas	L 68–77	10–1	Frank Erwin Center; Austin, Texas
Jan 3, 1984*	No. 1	at No. 2 Louisiana Tech	L 66–75	10–2	Thomas Assembly Center; Ruston, Louisiana
Jan 6, 1984*	No. 1	at No. 7 Old Dominion	L 90–102	10–3	Norfolk Scope; Norfolk, Virginia
Jan 8, 1984*	No. 5	at Rutgers	W 95–80	11–3	Rutgers Athletic Center; Piscataway, New Jersey
Jan 13, 1984	No. 5	at Arizona	W 74–53	12–3 (1–0)	McKale Center; Tucson, Arizona
Jan 14, 1984	No. 5	at Arizona State	W 101–67	13–3 (2–0)	ASU Activity Center; Tempe, Arizona
Mar 3, 1984	No. 3	vs. UCLA	W 85–63	24–3 (13–0)	Gersten Pavilion; Los Angeles, California
Mar 4, 1984	No. 5	at No. 6 Long Beach State	L 67–71	24–4 (13–1)	Gold Mine; Long Beach, California
NCAA tournament
Mar 12, 1984*	(1 W) No. 5	(8 W) BYU; First round	W 97–72	25–4	L.A. Sports Arena; Los Angeles, California
Mar 19, 1984*	(1 W) No. 5	(4 W) Montana; Regional Semifinal – Sweet Sixteen	W 76–51	26–4	L.A. Sports Arena; Los Angeles, California
Mar 21, 1984*	(1 W) No. 5	(2 W) No. 6 Long Beach State; Regional Final – Elite Eight	W 90–74	27–4	L.A. Sports Arena; Los Angeles, California
Mar 30, 1984*	(1 W) No. 5	vs. (1 MW) No. 2 Louisiana Tech; National Semifinal – Final Four	W 62–57	28–4	Pauley Pavilion; Los Angeles, California
Apr 1, 1984*	(1 W) No. 5	vs. (3 ME) No. 15 Tennessee; National Championship	W 72–61	29–4	Pauley Pavilion; Los Angeles, California
*Non-conference game. ^{#}Rankings from AP Poll. (#) Tournament seedings in parentheses. W=West. All times are in Pacific Time.

Source: USCTrojans.com

== Rankings ==
Ranking movements Legend: ██ Increase in ranking ██ Decrease in ranking
	Week																
Poll	1	2	3	4	5	6	7	8	9	10	11	12	13	14	15	16	Final
AP	1	1	1	1	1	1	1	5	4	3	3	3	3	3	3	5	5
