= Linda Sharp =

American basketball coach (born 1950)

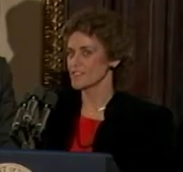
- Sharp at the White House in 1984 following USC's national championship.

Biographical details
- Born: March 14, 1950 (age 76); Okmulgee, Oklahoma, U.S.

Playing career
- 1968–1970: Fullerton JC
- 1970–1972: Cal State Fullerton
- Position: Guard

Coaching career (HC unless noted)
- 1974–1977: Mater Dei HS
- 1976–1977: USC (assistant)
- 1977–1989: USC
- 1989–1997: Southwest Texas State
- 1997: Los Angeles Sparks
- 2000: Phoenix Mercury (assistant)
- 2001–2008: Concordia (TX)
- 2002: Phoenix Mercury

Head coaching record
- Overall: 496–271 (.647) (college); 9–24 (.273) (WNBA)

Accomplishments and honors

Championships
- 2× NCAA Division I Champion (1983, 1984); 3× NCAA Regional—Final Four (1983, 1984, 1986)
- Women's Basketball Hall of Fame

Linda Kay Sharp (born March 14, 1950) is an American former collegiate women's basketball coach. Her coaching career spans 31 seasons with stints on all levels from elementary, junior high and high school to the collegiate and professional ranks, and she was inducted into the Women's Basketball Hall of Fame in 2001.

== Early life and education ==
Born in Okmulgee, Oklahoma and raised in Cypress, California, Sharp attended John F. Kennedy High School in Los Angeles and played at point guard on the basketball team. She enrolled at Fullerton Junior College in 1968 to begin her college basketball career and transferred to Cal State Fullerton in 1970. In her senior season, Cal State Fullerton finished third in the 1972 AIAW national championship.

== Coaching career ==
=== College ===
After graduating from Cal State Fullerton in 1973 with a physical education degree, Sharp taught part-time at a local Catholic school and also did substitute teaching before landing a full-time teaching and coaching position at Mater Dei High School in Santa Ana. Sharp taught American literature and physical education and coached girls' basketball, volleyball, and softball in addition to launching tennis and track programs.

In 1976, the University of Southern California (USC) hired Sharp as an assistant coach for its women's basketball program; Sharp was a part-time assistant at USC while still coaching at Mater Dei. After one year, USC promoted Sharp to head coach. In twelve seasons from 1977 to 1989, Sharp accumulated a 271-99 won-loss record.

Turning around a program that won only five games in 1976–77, USC won 21 games in Sharp's second season as head coach in 1978–79. Sharp led USC to back-to-back NCAA national championships in 1983 and 1984. For USC's 1984 national title, Sharp earned WCAA, Wade Trophy, and Sporting News Coach of the Year honors. While at USC, she was selected as the Pac-10 Conference "Coach of the Year" three times. In May 1989, she resigned from the program, citing a need for a new challenge while accepting the head coach position at Southwest Texas State University.

From 1989 to 1997, Sharp compiled a 138–85 record in eight seasons at Southwest Texas State (now Texas State).

For seven years, Sharp served on the NCAA Basketball Rules Committee.

In 2001, Sharp was hired as the head coach of the women's basketball team at Concordia University Texas, a Division III school. She coached the team for seven years and to an 87–87 won-loss record. On September 10, 2008, Sharp resigned from Concordia.

Sharp's career head coach record is 496–271 after 27 years coaching NCAA women's basketball.

=== WNBA ===
In 1997, she became the first head coach of the Los Angeles Sparks of the Women's National Basketball Association. Sharp later assisted her former player at USC, Cheryl Miller, with the Phoenix Mercury in 2000. Then in 2002, Sharp became the interim head coach for the Phoenix Mercury after Cynthia Cooper resigned from the position. Sharp had a 9–24 overall record as a WNBA head coach.

=== USA Basketball ===
Sharp was chosen as the head coach of the team representing the US in 1981 at the William Jones Cup competition in Taipei, Taiwan. The team won their first four games easily, then faced the Republic of China - Blue team. Although the USA had an early ten-point lead, the Blue team came back to lead by four points at halftime. The USA opened the second half with a 9–2 run to reclaim the lead for good and went on to win the game. They then went on to win their next two games easily, and faced the defending champions South Korea in the final. The game was very close, throughout much of the game, including a tie at 49 points each with about ten minutes to go. The South Koreans then pulled out to a nine-point lead with under two minutes left. The USA team pulled the margin back to three points, but could not close the gap. The South Korean team won, and the USA team received the silver medal.

Sharp was the head coach of the team representing the US at the World University Games held in Zagreb, Yugoslavia in July 1987. The team started out with a 35-point victory over Poland and followed that with a 41-point victory over Finland. In the third game, the USA faced the host team Yugoslavia. The USA hit a high percentage of their shots from the free throw line, 16 of 19, but the Yugoslav team earned 43 shots from the line, of which they made 34. With a home crowd behind them, the game came down to the wire, and was tied at the end of regulation. In overtime, Yugoslavia out scored the US and won the game 93–89. The USA still had a chance to make it to the medal round, but to do so had to win their next game against China, and do so by at least five points. The USA fell behind, and were down 16 points at halftime. They fell behind by 20 at one point, but made up the deficit and more in the second half. They went on to win the game, but by only a single point 84–83. They won their final game against Canada, but this left them in fifth place, the first time ever the USA team did not win a medal at the World University Games.

== Head coaching record ==
=== College ===
Source for USC:

Sources for Texas State:

Source for Concordia (TX):

Record table
Season	Team	Overall	Conference	Standing	Postseason
USC Trojans (Western Collegiate Athletic Association/Pacific West Conference) (1977–1986)
1977–78	USC	11–13	3–5	4th	
1978–79	USC	21–10	4–4	3rd	WAIAW Regionals
1979–80	USC	22–12	9–3	2nd	AIAW Regionals
1980–81	USC	26–8	9–3	2nd	AIAW Final Four
1981–82	USC	23–4	9–3	2nd	NCAA Regionals
1982–83	USC	31–2	13–1	1st	NCAA Champions
1983–84	USC	29–4	13–1	T–1st	NCAA Champions
1984–85	USC	21–9	10–4	T–2nd	NCAA Regionals
1985–86	USC	31–5	8–0	1st	NCAA Runner-up
USC Trojans (Pacific-10 Conference) (1986–1989)
1986–87	USC	22–8	15–3	1st	NCAA Regionals
1987–88	USC	22–8	15–3	2nd	NCAA Regionals
1988–89	USC	12–16	8–10	T–4th	
USC:		277–99 (.737)	106–40 (.726)		
Southwest Texas State Bobcats (Southland Conference) (1989–1997)
1989–90	Southwest Texas State	16–11	6–8	6th	
1990–91	Southwest Texas State	14–13	8–6	T–3rd	
1991–92	Southwest Texas State	17–12	13–5	3rd	
1992–93	Southwest Texas State	19–8	15–3	2nd	
1993–94	Southwest Texas State	20–8	13–5	4th	
1994–95	Southwest Texas State	17–11	11–7	3rd	
1995–96	Southwest Texas State	18–10	14–4	2nd	
1996–97	Southwest Texas State	17–12	11–5	T–2nd	NCAA first round
Southwest Texas State:		138–85 (.619)	91–43 (.679)		
Concordia Tornadoes (American Southwest Conference) (2001–2008)
2001–02	Concordia (TX)	13–12	7–7	5th (West)	
2002–03	Concordia (TX)	12–12	8–6	4th (West)	
2003–04	Concordia (TX)	16–9	8–6	T–3rd (West)	
2004–05	Concordia (TX)	16–10	15–7	4th (West)	
2005–06	Concordia (TX)	8–17	7–15	5th (West)	
2006–07	Concordia (TX)	8–16	8–13	5th (West)	
2007–08	Concordia (TX)	14–11	12–9	T–4th (West)	
Concordia (TX):		87–87 (.500)	65–63 (.508)		
Total:		496–271 (.647)			
National champion Postseason invitational champion Conference regular season champion Conference regular season and conference tournament champion Division regular season champion Division regular season and conference tournament champion Conference tournament champion

=== WNBA ===
Legend
Regular season	G	Games coached	W	Games won	L	Games lost	W–L %	Win–loss %
Playoffs	PG	Playoff games	PW	Playoff wins	PL	Playoff losses	PW–L %	Playoff win–loss %

Team	Year	G	W	L	W–L%	Finish	PG	PW	PL	PW–L%	Result
Los Angeles	1997	11	4	7	.364	(replaced)	—	—	—	—	—
Phoenix	2002	22	5	17	.227	7th in West	—	—	—	—	Missed playoffs
Career		33	9	24	.273		—	—	—	—	
