= 1984 NCAA Division I women's basketball tournament =

American college basketball tournament

- Teams: 32
- Finals site: Pauley Pavilion, Los Angeles, California
- Champions: USC (2nd title, 2nd title game, 2nd Final Four)
- Runner-up: Tennessee (1st title game, 2nd Final Four)
- Semifinalists: Cheyney (2nd Final Four); Louisiana Tech (3rd Final Four)
- Winning coach: Linda Sharp (2nd title)
- MOP: Cheryl Miller (USC)

The 1984 NCAA Division I women's basketball tournament began on March 16 and ended on April 1. It featured 32 teams, four fewer than the previous year. Tennessee, Louisiana Tech, Cheyney, and Southern California were the Final Four, with Southern California defeating Tennessee, 72–61, for its second straight title. USC's Cheryl Miller was named the Most Outstanding Player of the tournament. The semi-finals and finals were held in Pauley Pavilion on the campus of UCLA in Los Angeles, California.

== Notable events ==
Three of the four team earning a bid to the Final Four did so winning the Regional game on their own floor. The exception, the East Regional was held at a neutral site, the Norfolk Scope, but that was the home town of Old Dominion, who had won 45 consecutive home games, before meeting Cheyney State in the East Regional final. Cheyney State won by a score of 80–71. The win matched them up against the three seed Tennessee, who upset Georgia to win the Mideast Regional. The score of the semi-final was also 80–71, but this time the Lady Vols were the victor.

In 1983, USC and Louisiana Tech met in the National championship game, with USC prevailing. The two teams next played in the regular season in January 1984, with Louisiana Tech beating USC 75–66 in at the home court of La Tech.. In the 1984 Tournament, USC advanced to the Final Four by beating Long Beach State 90–74, in the West Region, while Louisiana Tech beat Texas 85–60, to win the Midwest Regional. This set up a rematch, in the national semifinal. The game was close, and tied at 57 points apiece with under three minutes to go, when Cheryl Miller scored the last five points of the game to help USC advance to the championship game 62–57.

The score of the championship game was reasonably close, 72–61, but according to Sports Illustrated, "USC outscored, out-passed, outdanced and just plain outflashed Tennessee". Led by Cheryl Miller and the McGee twins, Pamela and Paula, USC won its second consecutive National Championship. Helped by the school's proximity to the media outlets, Women's basketball received considerable media coverage, with the three stars of the team participating in many print interviews and almost 75 television appearances.

== Records ==
Mary Ostrowski hit nine of nine attempted free throws, the second most for an individual player in a Final Four game, the National Semi-final.

Over the two games of the Final four, she hit 15 of 15, the only player to hit every free throw (minimum 12 attempts) in Final Four games.

Tennessee, as a team, hit nine of nine attempted free throws, the second most for team in a Final Four game, in the National championship game.

Long Beach State scored 22 points in an overtime period, in the West Regional semi-final, the most ever scored in an NCAA tournament overtime period.

== Qualifying teams – automatic ==
Thirty-two teams were selected to participate in the 1984 NCAA Tournament. Seventeen conferences were eligible for an automatic bid to the 1984 NCAA tournament. (Not all conference records are available for 1984)

Automatic bids
		Record		
Qualifying school	Conference	Regular Season	Conference	Seed
BYU	High Country	18–7	9–1	8
Central Michigan	MAC	27–2	18–0	7
Drake	Gateway (Note: Drake is recognized in the NCAA record books as having been a member of both the Gateway Collegiate Athletic Conference (Gateway) and Missouri Valley Conference (MVC) in 1984, although the latter did not sponsor women's sports until the 1992–93 school year. The Gateway was founded in 1982 as a women's-only conference parallel to the MVC. In 1985, the Gateway added football as its only men's sport. When the women's side of the Gateway merged into the MVC in 1992, the football side remained in operation, and is now known as the Missouri Valley Football Conference.)	22–6	16–2	7
Georgia	SEC	28–2	7–1	1
Kansas State	Big Eight	25–5	12–2	3
UNLV	Pacific Coast	24–6	4–0	7
Louisville	Metro	16–15	7–3	8
Middle Tennessee State	Ohio Valley	19–9	12–2	6
Montana	Mountain West Athletic	25–3	14–0	4
North Carolina	ACC	23–7	9–5	2
Northeast Louisiana	Southland	22–3	12–0	6
Ohio State	Big Ten	22–6	17–1	5
Old Dominion	Sun Belt	22–4	-–-	1
Oregon	Northern Pacific	23–6	10–2	3
Penn State	Atlantic 10	19–11	6–2	8
St. John's	Big East	24–5	5–3	7
Texas	Southwest	30–2	16–0	2
USC	Western Collegiate	24–4	13–1	1

== Qualifying teams – at-large ==
Fifteen additional teams were selected to complete the thirty-two invitations.

At-large bids
		Record		
Qualifying school	Conference	Regular Season	Conference	Seed
Alabama	SEC	22–8	5–3	2
Cheyney State	Independent	22–4	-–-	3
Long Beach State	Western Collegiate	23–5	13–1	2
Louisiana Tech	Independent	27–2	-–-	1
LSU	SEC	22–6	5–3	5
Maryland	ACC	19–9	10–4	6
Ole Miss	SEC	23–5	6–2	4
Missouri	Big Eight	25–5	12–2	4
North Carolina State	ACC	22–8	9–5	4
Oregon State	Northern Pacific	21–7	9–3	5
San Diego State	Western Collegiate	23–5	9–5	6
Tennessee	SEC	19–9	7–1	3
Texas Tech	Southwest	23–6	13–3	8
Virginia	ACC	22–6	11–3	5

== Bids by conference ==
Seventeen conferences earned an automatic bid. In eleven cases, the automatic bid was the only representative from the conference. Twelve at-large teams were selected from six of the conferences. In addition, three independent (not associated with an athletic conference) teams earned at-large bids.

Bids	Conference	Teams
5	SEC	Alabama, Georgia, LSU, Ole Miss, Tennessee
4	ACC	Maryland, North Carolina, North Carolina State, Virginia
3	Western Collegiate	Long Beach State, San Diego State, USC
2	Big 8	Kansas State, Missouri
2	Independent	Cheyney, Louisiana Tech
2	Northern Pacific	Oregon, Oregon State
2	Southwest	Texas, Texas Tech
1	Atlantic 10	Penn State
1	Big East	St. John's
1	Big Ten	Ohio State
1	Gateway	Drake
1	High Country	BYU
1	MAC	Central Michigan
1	Metro	Louisville
1	Mountain West Athletic	Montana
1	Ohio Valley	Middle Tennessee State
1	Pacific Coast	UNLV
1	Southland	Northeast Louisiana
1	Sun Belt	Old Dominion

== First round ==
In 1984, the field returned to 32 teams, in the same format as in 1982. The teams were seeded, and assigned to four geographic regions, with seeds 1-8 in each region. In Round 1, the higher seed was given the opportunity to host the first-round game. In most cases, the higher seed accepted the opportunity. The exceptions:

- Ole Miss was a 4 seed, but unable to host, so the game was played at 5 seed Ohio State
- Alabama was a 2 seed, but played at Central Michigan, the 7 seed
- Missouri was a 4 seed, but played at LSU, the 5 seed
- Kansas State was a 3 seed, but played at Northeast Louisiana, the 6 seed
- Oregon was a 3 seed, but played at San Diego State, the 6 seed
- Long Beach State was a 2 seed, playing the 7 seed, University of Nevada, Las Vegas. The game was played at the University of Southern California (USC). For this reason there are only 15 first round venues, as all locations hosted one game except the Los Angeles Memorial Sports Arena, home of USC, which hosted two games.

The following table lists the region, host school, venue and the 15 first round locations.

1984 NCAA first round

Region	Host	Venue	City	State
East	Cheyney University of Pennsylvania	Cope Hall	Cheyney	Pennsylvania
East	Old Dominion University	Old Dominion University Fieldhouse	Norfolk	Virginia
East	North Carolina State University	Reynolds Coliseum	Raleigh	North Carolina
East	University of North Carolina	Carmichael Auditorium	Chapel Hill	North Carolina
Mideast	University of Tennessee	Stokely Athletic Center	Knoxville	Tennessee
Mideast	University of Georgia	Georgia Coliseum (Stegeman Coliseum)	Athens	Georgia
Mideast	Ohio State University	St. John Arena	Columbus	Ohio
Mideast	Central Michigan University	Daniel P. Rose Arena (McGuirk Arena)	Mount Pleasant	Michigan
Midwest	Louisiana Tech University	Thomas Assembly Center	Ruston	Louisiana
Midwest	Louisiana State University	LSU Assembly Center (Pete Maravich Assembly Center)	Baton Rouge	Louisiana
Midwest	Northeast Louisiana University	Ewing Coliseum	Monroe	Louisiana
Midwest	University of Texas at Austin	Frank Erwin Center	Austin	Texas
West	University of Southern California	Los Angeles Memorial Sports Arena	Los Angeles	California
West	San Diego State University	Peterson Gym	San Diego	California
West	University of Montana–Missoula	Dahlberg Arena	Missoula	Montana

== Regionals and Final Four ==
1984 NCAA regionals and Final Four

The regionals, named for the general location, were held from March 22 to March 25 at these sites:

- East Regional Norfolk Scope, Norfolk, Virginia (Host: Old Dominion University)
- Mideast Regional Stokely Athletic Center, Knoxville, Tennessee (Host: University of Tennessee)
- Midwest Regional Thomas Assembly Center, Ruston, Louisiana (Host: Louisiana Tech University)
- West Regional Los Angeles Memorial Sports Arena, Los Angeles, California (Host: University of California, Los Angeles)

Each regional winner advanced to the Final Four, held March 30 and April 1 in Los Angeles, California at Pauley Pavilion. UCLA served as the host institution.

== Bids by state ==
The thirty-two teams came from twenty-two states. California and Louisiana had the most teams with three each. Twenty-eight states did not have any teams receiving bids.

NCAA Women's basketball Tournament invitations by state 1984

Bids	State	Teams
3	California	USC, Long Beach State, San Diego State
3	Louisiana	Northeast Louisiana, Louisiana Tech, LSU
2	North Carolina	North Carolina, North Carolina State
2	Oregon	Oregon, Oregon State
2	Pennsylvania	Penn State, Cheyney
2	Tennessee	Middle Tennessee State, Tennessee
2	Texas	Texas, Texas Tech
2	Virginia	Old Dominion, Virginia
1	Alabama	Alabama
1	Georgia	Georgia
1	Iowa	Drake
1	Kansas	Kansas State
1	Kentucky	Louisville
1	Maryland	Maryland
1	Michigan	Central Michigan
1	Mississippi	Ole Miss
1	Missouri	Missouri
1	Montana	Montana
1	Nevada	UNLV
1	New York	St. John's
1	Ohio	Ohio State
1	Utah	BYU

== Brackets ==
=== Mideast regional – University of Tennessee - Knoxville, TN (Stokely Athletic Center) ===
First round March 16–18
1	Georgia	112
8	Louisville	69
4	Ole Miss	77
5	Ohio State	55
3	Tennessee	70
6	Middle Tennessee St	52
2	Alabama	78
7	Central Michigan	70

Regional semifinals March 22–23
1	Georgia	73
4	Ole Miss	63
3	Tennessee	65
2	Alabama	58

Regional finals March 25
1	Georgia	61
3	Tennessee	73

=== Midwest regional – Louisiana Tech - Ruston, LA (Thomas Assembly Center) ===
First round March 16–18
1	Louisiana Tech	94
8	Texas Tech	68
4	Missouri	82
5	LSU	92
3	Kansas State	73
6	Northeast Louisiana	78
2	Texas	96
7	Drake	60

Regional semifinals March 22–23
1	Louisiana Tech	92
5	LSU	67
6	Northeast Louisiana	91
2	Texas	99

Regional finals March 25
1	Louisiana Tech	85
2	Texas	60

=== East regional – Old Dominion - Norfolk, VA (Norfolk Scope) ===
First round March 16–18
1	Old Dominion	87
8	Penn State	65
4	NC State	86
5	Virginia	73
3	Cheyney State	92
6	Maryland	64
2	North Carolina	81
7	St. John's	79 (OT)

Regional semifinals March 22–23
1	Old Dominion	73
4	NC State	71 (OT)
3	Cheyney State	73
2	North Carolina	72

Regional finals March 24
1	Old Dominion	71
3	Cheyney State	80

=== West regional – Los Angeles, CA (Los Angeles Memorial Sports Arena) ===
First round March 12–14
1	USC	97
8	BYU	72
4	Montana	56
5	Oregon State	47
3	Oregon	63
6	San Diego State	70
2	Long Beach State	78
7	UNLV	58

Regional semifinals March 19
1	USC	76
4	Montana	51
6	San Diego State	73 (OT)
2	Long Beach State	91

Regional finals March 21
1	USC	90
2	Long Beach State	74

=== Final Four – University of Southern California Los Angeles, CA (Pauley Pavilion) ===
National semifinals March 30
3ME	Tennessee	80
3E	Cheyney State	71
1MW	Louisiana Tech	57
1W	USC	62

National championship April 1
3ME	Tennessee	61
1W	USC	72

== Record by conference ==
Ten conferences had more than one bid, or at least one win in NCAA Tournament play:

Conference	# of Bids	Record	Win %	Round of 32	Sweet Sixteen	Elite Eight	Final Four	Championship Game
Southeastern	5	9–5	.643	5	5	2	1	1
Atlantic Coast	4	2–4	.333	2	2	–	–	–
Western Collegiate	3	8–2	.800	3	3	2	1	1
Independent	2	6–2	.667	2	2	2	2	–
Southwest	2	2–2	.500	1	1	1	–	–
Big Eight	2	0–2	–	–	–	–	–	–
Northern Pacific	2	0–2	–	–	–	–	–	–
Sun Belt	1	2–1	.667	1	1	1	–	–
Mountain West Athletic	1	1–1	.500	1	1	–	–	–
Southland	1	1–1	.500	1	1	–	–	–

Eight conferences went 0–1: Atlantic 10, Big East, Big Ten, High Country, Metro, MAC, Missouri Valley Conference, Ohio Valley Conference, and the Pacific Coast

== All-Tournament team ==
- Cheryl Miller, Southern California
- Paula McGee, Southern California
- Pam McGee, Southern California
- Janice Lawrence, Louisiana Tech
- Mary Ostrowski, Tennessee

== Game officials ==
- Tommie Salerno (semifinal)
- Larry Sheppard (semifinal)
- Bob Olsen (semifinal, final)
- Marcy Weston (semifinal, final)

== See also ==
- 1984 NCAA Division I men's basketball tournament
- 1984 NCAA Division II women's basketball tournament
- 1984 NCAA Division III women's basketball tournament
- 1984 NAIA women's basketball tournament
