= Cheryl Miller =

American basketball player (born 1964)

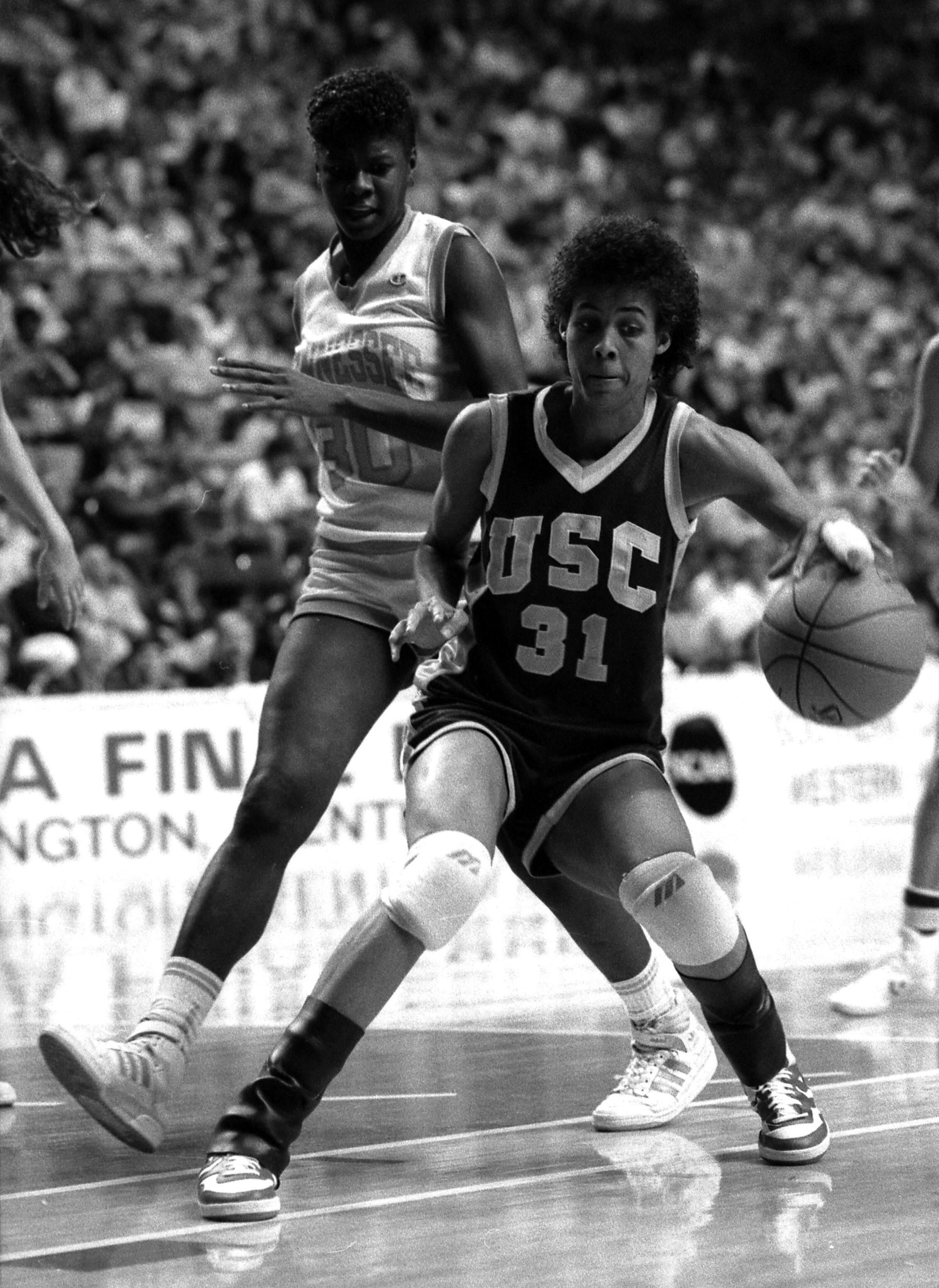
- Miller with USC during a game in 1986

Personal information
- Born: January 3, 1964 (age 62) Riverside, California, U.S.
- Listed height: 6 ft 2 in (1.88 m)
- Listed weight: 180 lb (82 kg)

Career information
- High school: Riverside Polytechnic (Riverside, California)
- College: USC (1982–1986)
- Position: Small forward
- Coaching career: 1986–present

Career highlights
- As player: 2× NCAA champion (1983, 1984); 2× NCAA Tournament MOP (1983, 1984); 3× Naismith Player of the Year (1984–1986); Wade Trophy (1985); 2× Honda Sports Award (1984, 1985); 2× USA Basketball Female Athlete of the Year (1984, 1986); Broderick Cup (1984); 2× WBCA Player of the Year (1985, 1986); 4× Kodak All-American (1983–1986); No. 31 retired by USC Trojans; As coach: WNBA All-Star Game coach (2024)
- Basketball Hall of Fame
- Women's Basketball Hall of Fame
- FIBA Hall of Fame
Medals
Women's basketball
Representing the United States
Olympic Games
Gold medal – first place	1984 Los Angeles	Team competition
Pan American Games
Gold medal – first place	1983 Caracas	Team competition
Goodwill Games
Gold medal – first place	1986 Moscow	Team competition
FIBA World Championship for Women
Silver medal – second place	1983 Rio de Janeiro	Team competition
Gold medal – first place	1986 Moscow	Team competition
Jones Cup
Gold medal – first place	1984 Taipei	Team competition

Cheryl Deann Miller (born January 3, 1964) is an American former basketball player. She was a sideline reporter for NBA games on TNT Sports and also works for NBA TV as a reporter and analyst, having worked previously as a sportscaster for ABC Sports, TBS Sports, and ESPN. She was also head coach and general manager of the WNBA's Phoenix Mercury.

Regarded as one of the greatest women’s basketball players of all time, in 1995 Miller was enshrined in the Naismith Memorial Basketball Hall of Fame in Springfield, Massachusetts. In 1999, she was inducted into the inaugural class of the Women's Basketball Hall of Fame, located in Knoxville, Tennessee. On August 20, 2010, Miller was also inducted into the FIBA Hall of Fame for her success in international play.

She is the sister of retired NBA star and fellow Hall of Famer Reggie Miller and former Major League Baseball catcher Darrell Miller.

== Early life ==
Miller played at Riverside Polytechnic High School (1978–1982) where she was a four-year letter winner and led her team to a 132–4 record. She was awarded the Dial Award for the national high-school scholar-athlete of the year in 1981. She was the first player, male or female, to be named an All-American by Parade magazine four times. Averaging 32.8 points and 15.0 rebounds a game, Miller was Street & Smith's National High School Player of the Year in both 1981 and 1982. In her senior year she scored 105 points in a game against Norte Vista High School. She set California state records for points scored in a single season (1156) and a high-school career (3405).

== College career ==
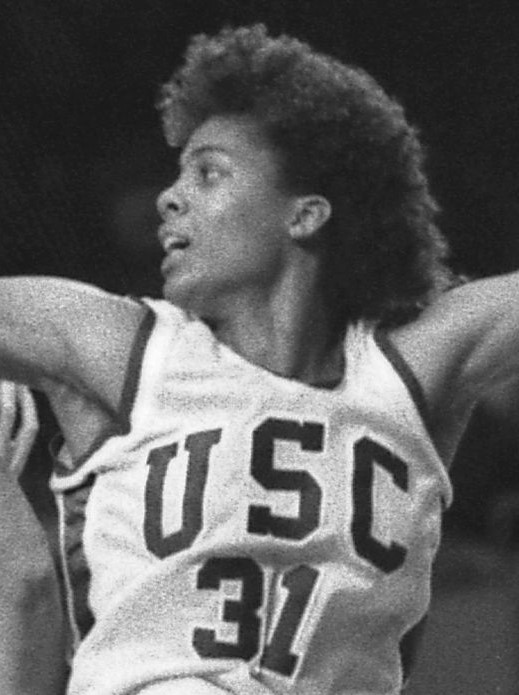
Miller in 1984, playing for USC

At the University of Southern California (USC), the 6-foot-2-inch (1.88 m) Miller played the forward position. A four-year letter winner, she scored 3,018 career points (10th all-time in NCAA history) and was a four-time All-American; her career rebounding mark of 1,534 ranks her third all-time in NCAA history. Miller was named Naismith College Player of the Year three times and earned the Wade Trophy (Player of the Year) once. At USC, Miller led the Trojans to a 112–20 record and NCAA champion titles in 1983 and 1984 and was named NCAA Tournament MOP both years. Miller's teammates included Cynthia Cooper, two-time WNBA MVP; Pamela McGee, 1984 Olympian and All-American; and Paula McGee, 1982 and 1983 All-American. Miller was coached by Linda K. Sharp, one of college basketball's winningest coaches. In her senior season, Miller picked up her third Naismith Award, the Broderick Award as the Female College Basketball Player of the Year and Sports Illustrated named her the best player in college basketball, male or female. Miller still holds numerous Trojan career records, including points (3,018, 23.6 ppg), rebounds (1,534, 12.0 rpg), field goals made (1,159), free throws made (700), games played (128), and steals (462). Miller's previous Trojan records in assists (414) was almost doubled by Rhonda Windham (735); Lisa Leslie topped her blocked shot record by one (321).

In 1986, Miller was nominated for the James E. Sullivan Award and USC retired her #31 jersey, the first retired jersey of a basketball player, male or female, at USC.

In October 2025, the Associated Press selected Miller as one of the greatest collegiate players in the women’s poll era alongside Diana Taurasi, Candace Parker, Breanna Stewart, and Caitlin Clark as the starting five players.

=== USC statistics ===
Legend
GP	Games played	GS	Games started	MPG	Minutes per game
FG%	Field goal percentage	3P%	3-point field goal percentage	FT%	Free throw percentage
RPG	Rebounds per game	APG	Assists per game	SPG	Steals per game
BPG	Blocks per game	PPG	Points per game	**Bold**	Career high

Cheryl Miller college statistics
Year	Team	GP	Points	FG%	FT%	RPG	APG	SPG	BPG	PPG
1982–83	USC	**33**	673	55.1%	73.7%	9.7	3.5	3.5	2.4	20.4
1983–84	USC	**33**	726	57.0%	75.2%	10.6	**3.6**	3.2	2.5	22.0
1984–85	USC	30	805	52.8%	69.6%	**15.8**	2.9	3.9	**2.7**	**26.8**
1985–86	USC	32	**814**	**60.9%**	**75.3%**	12.2	2.9	**4.0**	2.5	25.4
Career		128	3018	56.5%	73.5%	12.0	3.2	3.6	2.5	23.6

== USA Basketball ==
Miller played for the USA National team in the 1983 World Championships, held in São Paulo, Brazil. The team won six games, but lost two against the Soviet Union. In an opening round game, the USA team had a nine-point lead at halftime, but the Soviets came back to take the lead, and a final shot by the USA failed to drop, leaving the USSR team with a one-point victory 85–84, despite 23 points from Miller. The USA team won their next four games, setting up the gold medal game against USSR. This game was also close, and was tied at 82 points each with six seconds to go in the game. The Soviets' Elena Chausova received the inbounds pass and hit the game winning shot in the final seconds, giving the USSR team the gold medal with a score of 84–82. The USA team earned the silver medal. Miller led the team in scoring, averaging 17.6 points per game, and tied for the lead in rebounding at 4.4 per game.

In 1984, the USA sent its National team to the 1984 William Jones Cup competition in Taipei, Taiwan, for pre-Olympic practice. The team easily beat each of the eight teams they played, winning by an average of just under 50 points per game. Miller led the team in scoring, averaging 15.1 points per game, led the team in rebounding with 4.4 per game and led the team in steals with 27.

Miller led the U.S. team to the gold medal at the 1984 Summer Olympics in Los Angeles and was also part of the gold medal team at the 1983 Pan American Games in Caracas, Venezuela.

Miller was selected to represent the US at the inaugural Goodwill games, held in Moscow in July 1986. North Carolina State's Kay Yow served as head coach. The team opened up with a 72–53 victory over Yugoslavia, led by 19 points from Miller, and followed that with a 21-point win over Brazil 91–70. The third game was against Czechoslovakia and would be much closer. Miller was the scoring leader in this game, scoring 26 points to help the US to a 78–70 victory. The USA faced Bulgaria in the semi-final match up, and again won, this time 67–58. This set up the final against the Soviet Union, led by 7-foot-2 Uljana Semjonova, considered the most dominant player in the world. The Soviet team had a 152–2 record in major international competition over the prior three decades, including an 84–82 win over the US in the 1983 World Championships. The Soviets held the early edge, leading 21–19 at one time, before the USA went on a scoring run to take a large lead they would never relinquish. The final score was 83–60 in favor of the US, earning the gold medal for the USA squad. For the entire event, Miller averaged 20.6 points to lead the team in scoring.

Miller continued to represent the US with National team at the 1986 World Championships, held in Moscow, a month after the Goodwill games in Moscow. The USA team was even more dominant this time. The early games were won easily, and the semifinal against Canada, while the closest game for the USA so far, ended up an 82–59 victory. At the same time, the Soviet team was winning easily as well, and the final game pitted two teams each with 6–0 records. The Soviet team, having lost only once at home, wanted to show that the Goodwill games setback was a fluke. The USA team started by scoring the first eight points, and raced to a 45–23 lead, although the Soviets fought back and reduced the halftime margin to 13. The USA went on a 15–1 run in the second half to put the game away, and ended up winning the gold medal with a score of 108–88. Miller led all scorers in the game with 24 points.

== Post-college career ==
After graduating from USC in 1986, she was drafted by several professional basketball leagues, including the United States Basketball League, a men's league. In the late 1980s, however, Miller suffered knee injuries that prevented her from continuing her playing career. From 1986 to 1991, she was an assistant coach at USC and a television sportscaster.

In 1993 Miller took the head coaching job at her alma mater, USC, after the university chose to fire coach, Marianne Stanley. Miller coached two seasons (1993–95). Her teams had a combined 42–14 record and went to the NCAA tournament both seasons, making a Regional Final once. She then coached for four seasons (1997–2000) with the Phoenix Mercury of the WNBA, where she also served as general manager. "Run, run, run, run, run," Miller said about her kind of team. "Play some outstanding defense. I want this team to be physical, I want them to know the game." In 1998, Miller coached the Mercury to a 16–12 record and the WNBA Finals, where they lost to the Houston Comets. She resigned after the 2000 season, citing fatigue.

On April 30, 2014, she was named women's basketball coach at Langston University by athletic director Mike Garrett.

On May 26, 2016, she was named women's basketball coach at California State Los Angeles by athletic director Mike Garrett.

She is part-owner of the UpShot League, new development women's professional basketball league in the United States, set to have its debut season in May 2026.

== Coaching record ==
=== College ===
Record table
Season	Team	Overall	Conference	Standing	Postseason
USC Trojans (Pacific-10 Conference) (1993–1995)
1993–94	USC	26–4	16–2	1st	NCAA Division I Elite Eight
1994–95	USC	18–10	10–8	5th	NCAA Division I First Round
USC:		44–14 (.759)	26–10 (.722)		
Langston Lions (Red River Athletic Conference) (2014–2016)
2014–15	Langston	28–4	16–3		NAIA Division I Second Round
2015–16	Langston	20–8	14–4		NAIA Division I First Round
Langston:		48–12 (.800)	30–7 (.811)		
Cal State Los Angeles Golden Eagles (California Collegiate Athletic Association) (2016–2019)
2016–17	Cal State Los Angeles	15–14	12–8		
2017–18	Cal State Los Angeles	14–15	13–9		
2018–19	Cal State Los Angeles	9–17	6–16		
Cal State Los Angeles:		38–46 (.452)	31–33 (.484)		
Total:		130–72 (.644)			
National champion Postseason invitational champion Conference regular season champion Conference regular season and conference tournament champion Division regular season champion Division regular season and conference tournament champion Conference tournament champion

=== WNBA ===
Legend
Regular season	G	Games coached	W	Games won	L	Games lost	W–L %	Win–loss %
Playoffs	PG	Playoff games	PW	Playoff wins	PL	Playoff losses	PW–L %	Playoff win–loss %

Team	Year	G	W	L	W–L%	Finish	PG	PW	PL	PW–L%	Result
PHX	1997	28	16	12	.571	1st in West	1	0	1	.000	Lost in Semifinals
PHX	1998	30	19	11	.633	2nd in West	6	3	3	.500	Lost in WNBA Finals
PHX	1999	32	15	17	.469	4th in West	-	-	-		Missed playoffs
PHX	2000	32	20	12	.625	4th in West	2	0	2	.000	Lost in 1st Round
Career		122	70	52	.574		9	3	6	.333	

== Broadcast career ==
Cheryl Miller served as a sideline reporter for the NBA on TNT's Thursday night doubleheader coverage for TNT Sports. She also made appearances on NBA TV during the 2008-09 NBA season as a reporter and analyst. Miller joined Turner Sports in September 1995 as an analyst and reporter for the NBA on TBS and TNT. She made occasional appearances as a studio analyst for NBA games. In November 1996, became the first female analyst to call a nationally televised NBA game. She also served as the sideline reporter in 2K Sports' NBA 2K Series. She left the company after her contract expired in 2013.

Miller worked as a basketball commentator at the 1994 Goodwill Games. Miller worked as a basketball reporter and called weightlifting for the 2001 Goodwill Games. Miller served as women's basketball analyst and men's basketball reporter for NBC's coverage of the 1996 Atlanta Olympics.

Before joining Turner Sports, Miller also worked for ABC Sports/ESPN from 1987 to 1993, where she served as a reporter for ABC's Wide World of Sports and a commentator for the network's college basketball telecasts. She served as a field reporter for the 1987 Little League World Series and served as a correspondent for the 1988 Calgary Olympics.

Miller currently works as a studio analyst for NBC Sports' WNBA coverage alongside Maria Taylor and Sue Bird.

== Awards and honors ==
- 1984 – Winner of the Honda Sports Award for basketball
- 1984 – The Honda-Broderick Cup winner for all sports
- 1985 – Winner of the Honda Sports Award for basketball
- 1985 – Wade Trophy winner
- 1985, 1986 – Women's Basketball Coaches Association Player of the Year
- 1990 – National High School Hall of Fame
- 1991 – International Women's Sports Hall of Fame
- 2010 – FIBA Hall of Fame
- 2024 – California Hall of Fame

== See also ==
- List of basketball players who have scored 100 points in a single game
- List of NCAA Division I women's basketball players with 2,500 points and 1,000 rebounds
- List of NCAA Division I women's basketball career scoring leaders
- List of NCAA Division I women's basketball career rebounding leaders
