= Mary Ostrowski =

American basketball player

Personal information
- Born: April 22, 1962 Shreveport, Louisiana, U.S.
- Died: July 19, 2013 (aged 51) Abingdon, Virginia, U.S.
- Listed height: 6 ft 2 in (1.88 m)

Career information
- High school: Parkersburg Catholic (Parkersburg, West Virginia)
- College: Tennessee (1980–1984)
- Position: Forward
- Number: 14

Mary Ostrowski (April 22, 1962 – July 19, 2013) was an American basketball player. Known as Mary O, Mo, or Big O, she was a Hall of Fame member for the University of Tennessee Lady Volunteers.

== Early life ==
Mary Ostrowski was born on April 22, 1962, in Shreveport, Louisiana, the daughter of Chester Ostrowski and Freda Dowler Ostrowski, with three siblings. She grew up in Parkersburg, West Virginia. At Parkersburg Catholic High School, Ostrowski led her team to a state-record 88 consecutive wins and captured three West Virginia state titles, including Class A championships in 1977 and 1978.

She was a three-time recipient of the Russell A. Thom Award (1977–1979), which recognized the state’s top basketball player. In 1979, she became the only female athlete to be named West Virginia's Amateur Athlete of the Year. A noted Little League pitcher in her youth, Ostrowski was already commanding national attention by the time she entered high school.

In 1976, Tennessee coach Pat Summitt first noticed Ostrowski at a basketball camp in Fort Worth, Texas. Thinking she was watching a college player, Summitt was stunned to learn Ostrowski was only a high school freshman. That moment began a recruitment journey that ended with Ostrowski becoming the first No. 1-ranked recruit to sign with Tennessee, joining the Lady Vols in 1980.

== Career ==
=== Tennessee (1980–1984) ===
From 1980 to 1984, Ostrowski starred as a 6-foot-2 forward for the University of Tennessee Lady Volunteers. She earned a reputation for toughness, high basketball IQ, and fluid post play, particularly her signature hook shot.

Career Statistics

- 1,729 career points
- 994 rebounds
- Career averages: 13.8 points, 8.0 rebounds per game
- Senior year: 15.9 ppg, 8.6 rpg

Honors and accolades

- 1982 Kodak All-American
- All-SEC in 1982 and 1984
- SEC All-Tournament Team in 1982
- Led team in scoring in 1981–82 and 1983–84
- Led team in rebounding from 1981 to 1984

Ostrowski helped lead the Lady Vols to three NCAA Final Fours (1981, 1982, 1984). Her senior season in 1984 was especially dominant: she was named the NCAA Mideast Regional MVP, made the Final Four All-Tournament Team, and was the tournament’s leading scorer and rebounder.

=== International play and national recognition ===
Ostrowski was selected to the U.S. Junior National Team from 1978 to 1980, and then the U.S. National Team from 1981 to 1983. She helped the United States earn a gold medal at the 1983 World University Games.

== Legacy and honors ==
She graduated in 1985 with a degree in business administration.

- 2006: Inducted into the Lady Vol Hall of Fame
- 2011: The West Virginia Sports Writers Association renamed its annual Girls Basketball Player of the Year Award to the Mary Ostrowski Award
- 2012: Became the fifth woman inducted into the West Virginia Sports Hall of Fame

== Illness and death ==
In 2007, Ostrowski was diagnosed with multiple myeloma, a form of blood cancer. She died on July 19, 2013, at the age of 51 in Abingdon, Virginia.
