= Tanya Haave =

American basketball coach

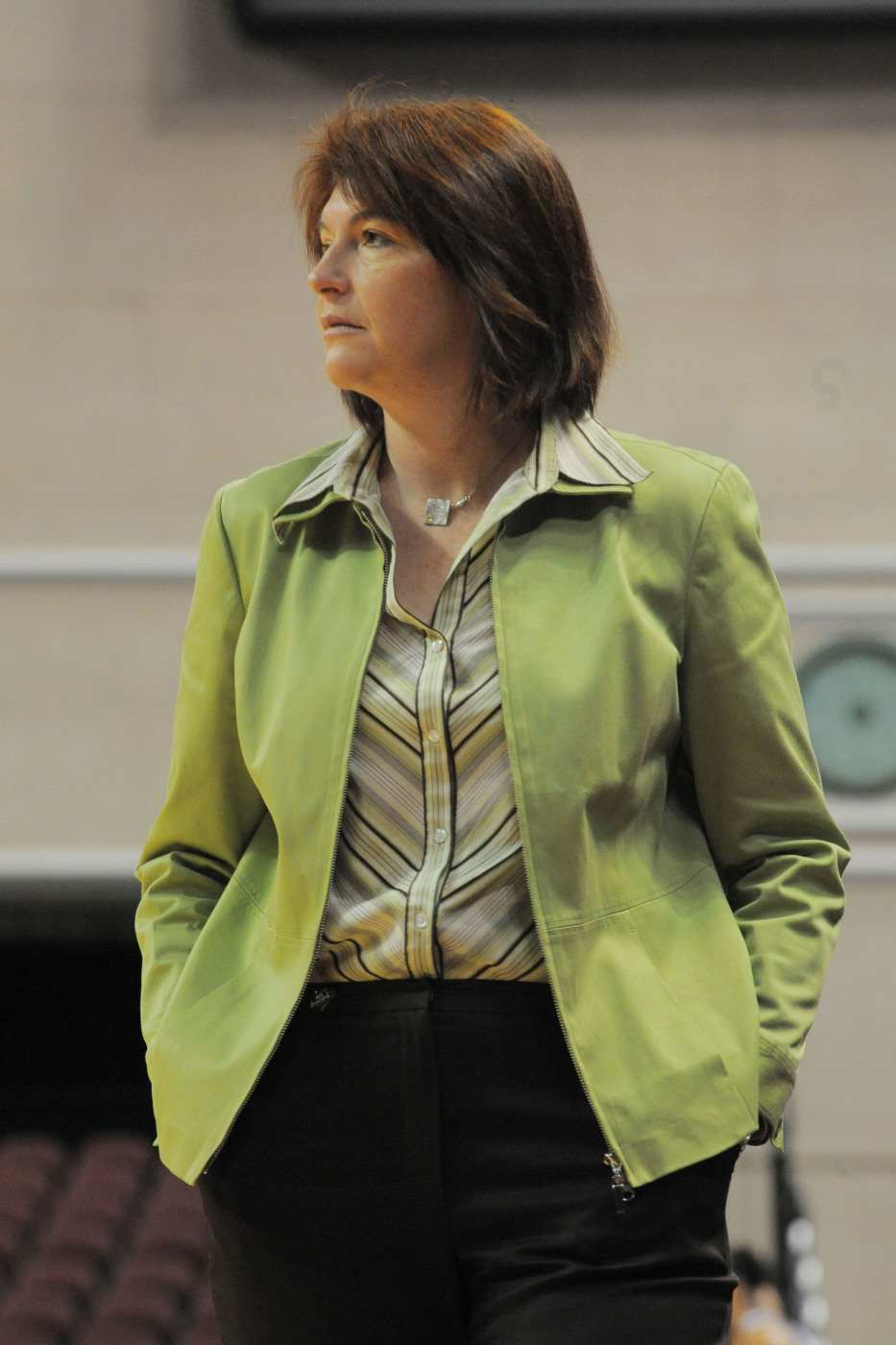
- Haave in 2009 while with the University of San Francisco

Current position
- Title: Head Coach
- Team: Metro State
- Conference: RMAC

Biographical details
- Born: 1963 (age 62–63); Evergreen, Colorado

Playing career
- 1980–1984: Tennessee

Coaching career (HC unless noted)
- 1999–2001: Regis (assistant)
- 2001–2005: Colorado (assistant)
- 2006: Denver
- 2006–2010: San Francisco
- 2010–present: Metro State

Accomplishments and honors

Awards
- Kodak All-American (1983)

Tanya Haave (born 1963) is an American collegiate head coach for the Metro State Roadrunners of the Rocky Mountain Athletic Conference. She played professional basketball in the Women's National Basketball League before becoming a head coach at Regis University. In 2003, she was inducted into the Colorado Sports Hall of Fame.

== Early life ==
Haave attended Evergreen High School where she competed in both basketball and volleyball. In 1980, she was named Sportswoman of the Year and later became the first woman to be named the Colorado Sports Hall of Fame High School Athlete of the Year. In her final year of high school, Haave set four basketball state tournament records, including recording a 100% single-game free throw record, and was named to a national All-America.

== Basketball career ==
=== Collegiate career ===
Haave attended the University of Tennessee (UT) from 1980 to 1984 under the guidance of coach Pat Summitt. As a member of the Lady Vols, she led the team to three NCAA Final Four appearances and two national championship games. As a result, she was named a 1983 Kodak All-American, and All-SEC and NCAA All-Regional team member twice. She became the first All-American for the Lady Vols and concluded her collegiate career as the all-time leading scorer in the programs history. In 1984, she received the Chancellor's Citation for Academic Excellence and Leadership and Woman of Achievement Award from the UT Commission for Women.

After graduating from Tennessee, she spent 14 years playing professional basketball overseas in France, Italy, Spain, Australia, and Sweden. She earned a silver medal with Team USA at the 1982 R. William Jones Cup.

=== Coaching career ===
Haave began her coaching career at Regis University from 1999 to 2001 before joining the Colorado Buffaloes women's basketball as an assistant coach. During her tenure with the Colorado Buffaloes, she was inducted into the Colorado Sports Hall of Fame. She stayed at Colorado until 2005, when she joined the Denver Pioneers women's basketball team as an assistant coach. In the year she left Colorado, Haave was inducted into the Tennessee Lady Vol Hall of Fame. While with the Denver Pioneers, she helped lead the team to a 15–13 overall record which included an appearance in the Sun Belt Conference tournament.

She stayed with the Pioneers for one year before earning her first NCAA Division I head coaching position with the University of San Francisco in 2006. During her four-year stay with the San Francisco Dons women's basketball team, Haave accumulated a 36–86 overall record and four straight seventh-place finishes in the West Coast Conference. This led to her being fired from San Francisco and hired for the Metro State Roadrunners of the Metropolitan State University of Denver. In her first year with the Roadrunners, she helped lead them to their first Rocky Mountain Athletic Conference Championship since 1998 and was named the Rocky Mountain Athletic Conference Coach of the Year. Her continued success with the team earned her a renewed contract with the university on May 13, 2013. By January 2015, Haave became the fastest Roadrunner coach to reach 100 wins in the schools history. She eventually tied former coach Darryl Smith for most Roadrunner wins in program history, with a 159–84 record. At the end of that season, where the Roadrunners finished second in the Rocky Mountain conference, Haave was named the Conference's Coach of the Year.
