= USC Trojans women's basketball =

American college basketball team

USC Trojans Women's Basketball
2026–27 USC Trojans women's basketball team
- University: University of Southern California
- Head coach: Lindsay Gottlieb (6th season)
- Location: Los Angeles, California
- Arena: Galen Center (capacity: 10,258)
- Conference: Big Ten
- Nickname: Trojans; Women of Troy
- Colors: Cardinal and gold
- All-time record: 847–560 (.602)

NCAA Division I tournament champions
- 1983, 1984
Other NCAA Division I tournament results
Runner-up	1986
Final Four	1983, 1984, 1986
Elite Eight	1982, 1983, 1984, 1986, 1992, 1994, 2024, 2025
Sweet Sixteen	1982, 1983, 1984, 1985, 1986, 1987, 1988, 1992, 1993, 1994, 2024, 2025
Appearances	1982, 1983, 1984, 1985, 1986, 1987, 1988, 1991, 1992, 1993, 1994, 1995, 1997, 2005, 2006, 2014, 2023, 2024, 2025, 2026

AIAW tournament Final Four
- 1981
Other AIAW tournament results
Appearances	1980, 1981

Conference tournament champions
- 2014, 2024

Conference regular-season champions
- Pac-12: 1983, 1984, 1986, 1987, 1994 Big Ten: 2025

Uniforms
Home	Away	Alternate

The USC Trojans women's basketball team, or the Women of Troy, is the collegiate women's basketball team that represents the University of Southern California, in the Big Ten Conference. The team rose to prominence in 1976, at which time scholarships became available to female basketball players. They were the first Division I team to give these scholarships.

== History ==
The Women of Troy made their first appearance in the Final Four in the 1981 AIAW Tournament. Following the successful 1982 season, in which USC reached the Elite Eight of the first NCAA tournament, the Trojans went on to win national championships in 1983 and 1984. The 1983 championship team included three All-Americans, Paula McGee, Cheryl Miller, and Rhonda Windham. The 1983 team went 31–2 in the regular and post-season combined. The 1983 team defeated Louisiana Tech by 2 points in the National Championship game with the final score being 69–67. The 1984 championship team went 29–4 in the regular and post season. The 1984 team faced University of Tennessee in the Championship game. The victory came by a healthy eleven points, with a final score of 72–61. USC made the National Championship again in 1986 but did not prevail. They lost to University of Texas 97–81. This is their most recent appearance in the National Championship game.

In 1987 and 1994 the Trojans won the Pac-10 Championship. The Trojans had begun their longest playoff drought in 1998, which was broken when the team made it to the playoff bracket in 2005. Not until 2011 did the Trojans make it to the postseason again. In 2006 USC opened the Galen Center, which was the new home of the Women of Troy. It can seat over 10,000 fans, and it was sold out in 2007 for a game between the Trojans and the UCLA Bruins. It was the first time in history that an NCAA women's basketball game was sold out. Every year since 1986, at least one member of the Trojans team has been honored in the Pac-10 awards. To date, eleven players who played for USC have won Olympic medals.

Given USC's early and iconic development of women's basketball, the legacy was featured in an HBO documentary entitled "Women of Troy," which premiered on March 10, 2020.

== Notable players ==
- Michelle Campbell, played 1993–1997, then played for the Washington Mystics of the WNBA in 2000.
- Cynthia Cooper, played 1982–1986. Cooper helped lead the team to its only national championships (1983, 1984) and in 1988 won an Olympic gold medal with the U.S. national basketball team in Seoul. She also played with the Houston Comets in the WNBA, where the team won titles in 1997, 1998, 1999, and 2000. Signed as head coach at Prairie View A&M University in 2005, then UNC Wilmington in 2010, followed by Texas Southern in 2012. She became the USC head coach for the 2013–14 season.
- Jacki Gemelos, played 2009–2012. She played on various WNBA teams as well as the Greek women's national basketball team. She is currently an assistant coach for the New York Liberty.
- Lisa Leslie, played 1990–1994. She set many records in points and rebounds, and in 1994, she was National Player of the Year. She got a contract with the WNBA in 1997, becoming one of the new league's first players, where she joined the Los Angeles Sparks. In 2001, she was the first WNBA player to win the regular season MVP, the All-Star Game MVP and the playoff MVP in the same season. Lisa also led the Los Angeles Sparks to two back-to-back WNBA Championships (2001, 2002). Lisa won 4 Olympic gold medals and was the first woman in the WNBA to make a slam-dunk during an official game. In 2009 she retired and is now a team owner of the Los Angeles Sparks.
- Nicky McCrimmon, played 1992–1994, then for the Los Angeles Sparks in 2000, and Houston Comets in 2005.
- Pamela McGee, played 1980–1984. She was a part of the NCAA championship team and earned an Olympic Gold for the United States in 1984. She also played in the WNBA.
- Dr. Paula McGee, played 1980–1984. She was a part of the NCAA championship team and is currently an academic and a public theologian.
- Cheryl Miller, played 1982–1986. She led the Women of Troy to two National Championships (1983, 1984) and won the NCAA tournament MVP both years. She also coached for the Women of Troy for 2 seasons (1993–1995). In her 2 seasons she had a combined 44–14 record and went to the NCAA tournament both seasons, making a Regional Final once. She then went on to coach in the WNBA for the Phoenix Mercury (1997–2000). She was inducted to the Women's Basketball Hall of Fame in 1999.
- Shay Murphy, played 2003–2007. She was a member of the Phoenix Mercury in 2014, when the squad won the WNBA championship.
- Tina Thompson, played 1993–1997. Thompson led USC to the NCAA tournament 3 times (1994, 1995, 1997) and to one Elite 8 (1994). In 1994 she was named Freshmen of the Year in the Pac-10 Conference and Freshmen All-America by Basketball Times. In 1997 she was the first overall draft pick in the WNBA by the Houston Comets, she became the first draftee in the history of the WNBA. She helped lead the Comets to 4 WNBA Championships in 1997, 1998, 1999 and 2000. Thompson played for Houston Comets from 1997 to 2008, the Los Angeles Sparks from 2009 to 2011, and the Seattle Storm from 2012 to 2013.
- Adrian Williams, played 1995–1999, then for the Minnesota Lynx, 2006–2007.
- JuJu Watkins, a rising sophomore for the Women of Troy who currently holds the record for the most points scored by a first-year women's college basketball player. She was the number 1 recruit for the class of 2023 and picked up countless conference and national accolades during her first season.

== Head coaches ==
- Linda Sharp (1977–1989) led the Women of Troy to 2 NCAA National Women Championships, 3 final four appearances. She ended her record with the Women of Troy with a 271–99 and was inducted into the Women's Basketball Hall of Fame in 2001.
- Marianne Stanley (1989–1993) led the Women of Troy to the NCAA tournament 3 years in a row and recruited future WNBA Stars Lisa Leslie, Tina Thompson and Nicky McCrimmon. She has been inducted into the Women's Basketball Hall of Fame in 2002.
- Cheryl Miller (1993–1995) coached only 2 seasons for the Women of Troy. In her 2 seasons she had a combined 44–14 record and went to the NCAA tournament both seasons, making a Regional Final once. Cheryl Miller is also a former player of the Women of Troy where she led the Women of Troy to two National Championships (1983, 1984) and won the NCAA tournament MVP both years. She then went on to coach in the WNBA for the Phoenix Mercury (1997–2000). She was inducted to the Women's Basketball Hall of Fame in 1999.
- Fred Willams (1995–1997) was assistant coach prior to serving as head coach. He went to coach in the WNBA after his final season at USC.
- Chris Gobrecht (1997–2004) played for the Women of Troy from 1974 to 1976.
- Mark Trakh (2004–2009) & (2017–2021) had two stints with the Women of Troy. His squads reached the NCAA tournament twice.
- Michael Cooper (2009–2013) resigned as head coach for the Women of Troy. Of his 4-season he ended with a record of 61–37 (.622).
- Cynthia Cooper-Dyke (2013–2017) a former Women of Troy player, who helped lead the team to its only National Championships (1983, 1984) and in 1988 won an Olympic gold medal with the U.S. national basketball team in Seoul. She also played with the Houston Comets in the WNBA, where she led the team to a record four consecutive WNBA championships (1997–2000). She took the head coaching job for the USC Women of Troy for the 2013–2014 season and remained until 2017.
- Lindsay Gottlieb (2021–) joined the Women of Troy after two seasons with the Cleveland Cavaliers as an assistant coach. Prior to her time in the NBA, Gottlieb was the head coach at California for 8 seasons, leading the team to 7 NCAA tournaments, including one final four appearance.

== Arenas ==
- Los Angeles Memorial Sports Arena was the Women of Troy's arena from 1977 until 2006. The Los Angeles Memorial Sports Arena was opened in 1959.
- Galen Center, which is 255,000 square feet, with a 45,000-square-foot pavilion, and has three practice courts and offices. The seating capacity is 10,258, and there are 22 private suites. Total construction cost was an estimated $147 million.
  The working of the Galen Center started in 2004 by a donation of $50 million by Louis Galen (a successful banker and long-time Trojan fan). The Galen Center opened in 2006.

== Roster ==
2025–26 USC Trojans women's basketball team
Players
Coaches

Pos.	#	Name	Height	Year	Previous school	Hometown
F	1	Sitaya Fagan	6 ft 4 in (1.93 m)	Fr	Centre of Excellence	Melbourne, AUS
G	2	Saniyah Hall	6 ft 0 in (1.83 m)	Fr	SPIRE Academy	Lorain, OH
C	3	Pania Davis	6 ft 6 in (1.98 m)	Sr	Florida State	Perth, AUS
G	4	Rian Forestier	5 ft 11 in (1.8 m)	Jr	Louis D. Brandeis	San Antonio, TX
F	6	Laura Williams	6 ft 1 in (1.85 m)	Jr	St. Paul VI Catholic	Fairfax, VA
G	9	Jazzy Davidson	6 ft 1 in (1.85 m)	So	Clackamas	Clackamas, OR
G	10	Ryann Bennett	5 ft 8 in (1.73 m)	Jr	UC Davis	Long Beach, CA
G	11	Kennedy Smith	6 ft 1 in (1.85 m)	Jr	Etiwanda	Chino, CA
G	12	JuJu Watkins	6 ft 2 in (1.88 m)	RS Jr	Sierra Canyon	Los Angeles, CA
G	13	Alesia Talkouskaya	6 ft 0 in (1.83 m)	Fr	Republic State College of Olympic Reserve	Smorgon, BLR
F	17	Sarah Okeke	6 ft 4 in (1.93 m)	Fr	DME Academy	Daytona Beach, FL
G	24	Brooklyn Shamblin	5 ft 8 in (1.73 m)	Jr	Oaks Christian School	Carpinteria, CA

Head coach

- Lindsay Gottlieb (Brown)

Assistant coach(es)

- Beth Burns (Ohio Wesleyan)
- Willnett Crockett (Connecticut)
- Nikki Blue (UCLA)
- Courtney Jaco (USC)
- Jonathan Yim (Cal State Fullerton)

Legend

- (C) Team captain
- (S) Suspended
- (I) Ineligible
- (W) Walk-on
- Injured
- Current redshirt

Roster
Last update: November 5, 2023

== Year by year results ==
Season	Team	Overall	Conference	Standing	Postseason	Coaches' poll	AP poll
Marci Cantrell (Independent, WCAA, Pac-8) (1976–1977)
1976–77	Marci Cantrell	5–16	1–7	4th (WCAA)			
Marci Cantrell:		5–16	1–7				
Linda Sharp (Independent, WCAA, Pac-10) (1977–1989)
1977–78	Linda Sharp	11–13	3–5	4th (WCAA)			
1978–79	Linda Sharp	21–10	4–4	3rd	WAIAW		
1979–80	Linda Sharp	22–12	9–3	3rd	AIAW First round		
1980–81	Linda Sharp	26–8	9–3	1st	AIAW Fourth Place		4
1981–82	Linda Sharp	23–4	9–3	2nd	NCAA Elite Eight		6
1982–83	Linda Sharp	31–2	13–1	1st	NCAA Champions		1
1983–84	Linda Sharp	29–4	13–1	1st	NCAA Champions		5
1984–85	Linda Sharp	21–9	10–4	2nd	NCAA Sweet Sixteen		15
1985–86	Linda Sharp	31–5	8–0	1st	NCAA Runner-up	2	3
Pac-12 Conference
1986–87	Linda Sharp	22–8	15–3	1st (Pac-12)	NCAA Sweet Sixteen	14	19
1987–88	Linda Sharp	22–8	15–3	2nd	NCAA Sweet Sixteen	13	15
1988–89	Linda Sharp	12–16	8–10	T-4th			
Linda Sharp:		271–99	116–40				
Marianne Stanley (Pac-10) (1989–1993)
1989–90	Marianne Stanley	8–19	6–12	7th			
1990–91	Marianne Stanley	18–12	11–7	3rd	NCAA Second round (Play-In)		
1991–92	Marianne Stanley	23–8	14–4	2nd	NCAA Elite Eight	12	23
1992–93	Marianne Stanley	22–7	14–4	2nd	NCAA Sweet Sixteen	14	15
Marianne Stanley:		71–46	45–27				
Cheryl Miller (Pac-10) (1993–1995)
1993–94	Cheryl Miller	26–4	16–2	1st	NCAA Elite Eight	9	7
1994–95	Cheryl Miller	18–10	10–8	5th	NCAA First round		
Cheryl Miller:		44–14	26–10				
Fred Williams (Pac-10) (1995–1997)
1995–96	Fred Williams	13–14	8–10	T-6th			
1996–97	Fred Williams	20–9	13–5	3rd	NCAA Second round		
Fred Williams:		33–23	21–15				
Chris Gobrecht (Pac-10) (1997–2004)
1997–98	Chris Gobrecht	12–15	7–11	6th			
1998–99	Chris Gobrecht	7–20	3–15	T-9th			
1999–2000	Chris Gobrecht	16–14	10–8	T-5th	WNIT Sixteen		
2000–01	Chris Gobrecht	13–15	8–10	T-6th			
2001–02	Chris Gobrecht	16–14	11–7	T-4th	WNIT Sixteen		
2002–03	Chris Gobrecht	14–17	8–10	T-5th			
2003–04	Chris Gobrecht	15–13	11–7	T-3rd			
Chris Gobrecht:		93–108	58–68				
Mark Trakh (Pac-10) (2004–2009)
2004–05	Mark Trakh	20–11	12–6	T-2nd	NCAA Second round	22	
2005–06	Mark Trakh	19–12	11–7	4th	NCAA Second round		
2006–07	Mark Trakh	17–13	10–8	5th			
2007–08	Mark Trakh	17–13	10–8	4th			
2008–09	Mark Trakh	17–15	9–9	T-4th			
Mark Trakh:		90–64	52–38				
Michael Cooper (Pac-10, Pac-12) (2009–2013)
2009–10	Michael Cooper	19–12	12–6	3rd			
2010–11	Michael Cooper	24–13	10–8	4th	WNIT Runner-up		
2011–12	Michael Cooper	18–12	12–6	3rd			
2012–13	Michael Cooper	11–20	7–11	7th			
Michael Cooper:		72–57	41–31				
Cynthia Cooper-Dyke (Pac-12) (2013–2017)
2013–14	Cynthia Cooper-Dyke	22–13	11–7	T-4th	NCAA First round		
2014–15	Cynthia Cooper-Dyke	15–15	7–11	T-7th			
2015–16	Cynthia Cooper-Dyke	19–13	6–12	8th			
2016–17	Cynthia Cooper-Dyke	14–16	5–13	9th			
Cynthia Cooper-Dyke:		70–57	29–43				
Mark Trakh (Pac-12) (2017–2021)
2017–18	Mark Trakh	19–10	9–9	7th			
2018–19	Mark Trakh	17–13	7–11	T-8th			
2019–20	Mark Trakh	17–14	8–10	7th	Postseason canceled due to COVID-19; WNIT bid was expected		
2020–21	Mark Trakh	11–12	8–10	8th			
Mark Trakh:		65–50 (155–114)	32–40 (84–78)				
Lindsay Gottlieb (Pac-12) (2021–2024)
2021–22	Lindsay Gottlieb	12–16	5–12	10th			
2022–23	Lindsay Gottlieb	21–10	11–7	T-4th	NCAA First Round		
2023–24	Lindsay Gottlieb	29–6	13–5	T-2nd	NCAA Elite Eight		
Lindsay Gottlieb (Big Ten) (2024–present)
2024–25	Lindsay Gottlieb	31–4	16–1	1st	NCAA Elite Eight		
2025–26	Lindsay Gottlieb	18-14	9-9	T-9th	NCAA Second Round		
Lindsay Gottlieb:		104–42	47–27				
Total:		892–571					
National champion Postseason invitational champion Conference regular season champion Conference regular season and conference tournament champion Division regular season champion Division regular season and conference tournament champion Conference tournament champion

== Postseason results ==
=== NCAA Division I ===
USC has appeared in the NCAA Division I women's basketball tournament twenty times. They have a record of 36–18.

Year	Seed	Round	Opponent	Result
1982	#1	First round Sweet Sixteen; Elite Eight	#8 Kent State #4 Penn State #2 Tennessee	W 99−55; W 73–70; L 90–91 (OT)
1983	#1	First round Sweet Sixteen; Elite Eight; Final Four; Title Game	#8 NE Louisiana #4 Arizona State #2 Long Beach State #2 Georgia #1 Louisiana Tech	W 99−85; W 96–59; W 81–74; W 81–57; W 69–67
1984	#1	First round Sweet Sixteen; Elite Eight; Final Four; Title Game	#8 BYU #4 Montana #2 Long Beach State #1 Louisiana Tech #3 Tennessee	W 97−72; W 76–51; W 90–74; W 62–57; W 72–61
1985	#4	First round Sweet Sixteen	#5 Idaho #1 Long Beach State	W 74−51; L 72–75
1986	#1	Second round Sweet Sixteen; Elite Eight; Final Four; Title Game	#8 Montana #4 North Carolina #2 Louisiana Tech #4 Tennessee #1 Texas	W 81−50; W 84–70; W 80–64; W 83–59; L 81–97
1987	#3	Second round Sweet Sixteen	#6 Western Kentucky #2 Ohio State	W 81−69; L 63–74
1988	#4	Second round Sweet Sixteen	#5 Nebraska #1 Iowa	W 100−82; L 67–79
1991	#5	First round Second round	#12 Utah #4 Long Beach State	W 63−52; L 58–83
1992	#3	Second round Sweet Sixteen; Elite Eight	#11 Montana #2 Stephen F. Austin #1 Stanford	W 71−59; W 61–57; L 62–82
1993	#3	Second round Sweet Sixteen	#6 Nebraska #2 Texas Tech	W 78−60; L 67–87
1994	#2	First round Second round Sweet Sixteen; Elite Eight	#15 Portland #7 George Washington #3 Virginia #4 Louisiana Tech	W 77−62; W 76–72; W 85–66; L 66–75
1995	#9	First round	#8 Memphis	L 72–74
1997	#6	First round Second round	#11 San Francisco #3 Florida	W 68−55; L 78–92
2005	#8	First round Second round	#9 Louisville #1 Michigan State	W 65−49; L 59–61
2006	#8	First round Second round	#9 South Florida #1 Duke	W 67−65; L 51–85
2014	#9	First round	#8 St. John's	L 68–71
2023	#8	First round	#9 South Dakota State	L 57–62 OT
2024	#1	First round Second round Sweet Sixteen; Elite Eight	#16 Texas A&M–Corpus Christi #8 Kansas #5 Baylor #3 UConn	W 84−55; W 73−55; W 74−70; L 73–80
2025	#1	First round Second round Sweet Sixteen; Elite Eight	#16 UNC Greensboro #9 Mississippi State #5 Kansas State #2 UConn	W 72−25; W 96−59; W 67−61; L 64−78
2026	#9	First round Second round	#8 Clemson #1 South Carolina	W 71−67 (OT); L 61−101

=== AIAW Division I ===
The Trojans made two appearances in the AIAW National Division I basketball tournament, with a combined record of 2–3.

Year	Round	Opponent	Result
1980	First round	South Carolina	L, 60–81
1981	Second round Quarterfinals; Semifinals; Third-place game	Oregon; Cheyney State; Louisiana Tech; Old Dominion	W, 67–64; W, 67–58; L, 50–66; L, 65–68

== Awards and achievements ==
=== Retired numbers ===
USC Trojans retired numbers
No.	Player	Year retired
11	Paula McGee	2012
14	Tina Thompson	2019
30	Pamela McGee	2012
31	Cheryl Miller	2006
33	Lisa Leslie	2006
44	Cynthia Cooper	2019

=== Career leaders ===
Rank	Points	3-pt FGs	Rebounds	Assists	Steals	Blocks
1.	3,018 - Cheryl Miller; 1982–86	292 - Ashley Corral; 2009–12	1,534 - Cheryl Miller; 1982–86	735 - Rhonda Windham; 1983–87	462 - Cheryl Miller; 1982–86	321 - Lisa Leslie; 1990–94
2.	2,474 - Cherie Nelson; 1986–88	213 - Courtney Jaco; 2014–17	1,255 -Pam McGee; 1981-84	473 -Thera Smith; 1979–82	309 - Tammy Story; 1998-2002	320 - Cheryl Miller; 1982–86
3.	2,414 - Lisa Leslie; 1990–94	183 - Brynn Cameron; 2004–09	1,232 - Cherie Nelson; 1986-89	466 -Camille Lenoir; 2004–09	256 - Cynthia Cooper; 1982-86	190 - Paula McGee; 1981-84
4.	2,346 - Paula McGee; 1981-84	181 - Eshaya Murphy; 2004–07	1,214 - Lisa Leslie; 1990–94	466 - Ashley Corral; 2009-12	249 - Ebony Hoffman; 2001–04	168 - Briana Gilbreath; 2009-12
5.	2,248 -Tina Thompson; 1993-97	177 - Aliyah Mazyck; 2015–2019	1,168 - Tina Thompson; 1993-97	450 - Minyon Moore; 2016–19	248 - Paula McGee; 1981–84	162 - Michelle Campbell; 1993-97
6.	2,214 - Pam McGee; 1981–84	154 - Camille Lenoir; 2004–09	1,155 - Paula McGee; 1981–84	422 - Tammy Story; 1989–92	241 - Briana Gilbreath; 2009-–12	139 - Chloe Kerr; 2004-07
7.	1,832 - Cassie Harberts; 2011–14	138 - Ariya Crook; 2012–14	1,003 - Ebony Hoffman; 2001–04	417 - Jamie Hagiya; 2004–07	234 -Eshaya Murphy; 2004–07	122 - Ebony Hoffman; 2001-04
8.	1,797- Kathy Hammond; 1978-81	132 - Jamie Hagiya; 2004–07	925- Cassie Harberts; 2011–14	414 - Cheryl Miller; 1982–86	228 - Lisa Leslie; 1990-94	119 -Pam McGee; 1982-84
9.	1,687 - Ebony Hoffman; 2001–04	118- Heather Oliver; 2007-10	917- Kristen Simon; 2014-18	395 - Brianna Barrett; 2013-16	221-Minyon Moore; 2016-19	110 - Nadia Parker; 2006-09
10.	1,608 - Briana Gilbreath; 2009–12	110 - Tammy Story; 1989-92	813 - Briana Gilbreath; 2009–12	381 - Cynthia Cooper; 1982-86	218-Karon Howell; 1986-89	109 - Cherie Nelson; 1986-99
