= Notre Dame Fighting Irish women's basketball =

American women's college basketball team

2026–27 Notre Dame Fighting Irish women's basketball team
- University: University of Notre Dame
- First season: 1977–78; 49 years ago
- Athletic director: Pete Bevacqua
- Head coach: Niele Ivey (7th season)
- Location: Notre Dame, Indiana
- Arena: Purcell Pavilion at the Edmund P. Joyce Center (capacity: 9,149)
- Conference: Atlantic Coast Conference
- Nickname: Fighting Irish
- Colors: Blue and gold

NCAA Division I tournament champions
- 2001, 2018
Other NCAA Division I tournament results
Runner-up	2011, 2012, 2014, 2015, 2019
Final Four	1997, 2001, 2011, 2012, 2013, 2014, 2015, 2018, 2019
Elite Eight	1997, 2001, 2011, 2012, 2013, 2014, 2015, 2017, 2018, 2019, 2026
Sweet Sixteen	1997, 1998, 2000, 2001, 2003, 2004, 2008, 2010, 2011, 2012, 2013, 2014, 2015, 2016, 2017, 2018, 2019, 2022, 2023, 2024, 2025, 2026
Appearances	1992, 1994, 1996, 1997, 1998, 1999, 2000, 2001, 2002, 2003, 2004, 2005, 2006, 2007, 2008, 2009, 2010, 2011, 2012, 2013, 2014, 2015, 2016, 2017, 2018, 2019, 2022, 2023, 2024, 2025, 2026

Conference tournament champions
- 1989, 1990, 1991, 1992, 1994 (MCC); 2013 (Big East); 2014, 2015, 2016, 2017, 2019, 2024 (ACC)

Conference regular-season champions
- 1985, 1986 (North Star); 1989, 1990, 1991, 1994, 1995 (MCC); 2001, 2012, 2013 (Big East); 2014, 2015, 2016, 2017, 2018, 2019, 2023, 2025 (ACC)

Uniforms
Home	Away	Alternate

The Notre Dame Fighting Irish women's basketball team is the intercollegiate women's basketball program representing University of Notre Dame in Notre Dame, Indiana. The program currently competes in the Atlantic Coast Conference of NCAA Division I. The Fighting Irish play their home games in the Purcell Pavilion at the Edmund P. Joyce Center, and are currently coached by Niele Ivey.

== History ==
=== Early growth and program foundations (1977–1996) ===
The Notre Dame women's basketball program commenced as a varsity sport in the 1977–78 season, gradually fostering a competitive identity while navigating through early conferences such as the North Star and Midwestern Collegiate Conference. Achievements during this period were modest yet noteworthy: Trena Keys earned consecutive North Star Conference Player of the Year honors in 1985 and 1986, and Karen Robinson followed with MCC Player of the Year recognition in 1990–91—reflecting the program's progress in establishing national relevance. In 1987–88, Notre Dame hired former Lehigh women's basketball coach Muffet McGraw as the programs new head coach. She had an immediate impact on the program and began building a national basketball powerhouse. During McGraw's tenure, the Irish won two national championships, appeared in 9 Final Fours, and captured multiple conference titles. She was a 4-time AP Coach of the Year (2001, 2013, 2014, 2018), 3-time Naismith Coach of the Year(2001, 2013, 2014), 3-time USBWA Coach of the Year (2001, 2013, 2014), and 3-time WBCA Coach of the Year, making her one of the most decorated coaches in women's basketball history.

Notre Dame's first milestone came in 1992, when the program earned its first NCAA Tournament appearance (lost in the first round), signaling that its developmental trajectory was reaching a broader stage.

=== First national strike: Final Four and 2001 championship (1996–2001) ===
Notre Dame's pivotal breakthrough arrived in 1997, as the Fighting Irish reached the program's first Final Four, laying the groundwork for elite status. They lost to eventual champion Tennessee that year in the National Semifinals, 80–66.

Four seasons later, in 2001, in an NCAA title game, Notre Dame erased a 12-point halftime deficit to defeat Purdue 68–66. All‑American center Ruth Riley hit crucial free throws with less than six seconds remaining. A 90–75 semifinal win over Connecticut had set the stage for this victory. This championship—a defining moment dubbed "Muffet and Her Miracles" —placed Notre Dame in the sport's upper echelon.

=== Building consistent success (2001–2010) ===
In the decade following the first title, Notre Dame sustained steady excellence. The team recorded numerous 20–win seasons, secured frequent NCAA bids, and reached the Sweet Sixteen regularly, even though another national championship remained elusive. These years were characterized by disciplined coaching and the laying of a foundation for future championship-caliber teams.

=== The golden era: Final Fours, championships, and rivalries (2010–2019) ===
The 2010s marked the pinnacle of Notre Dame women's basketball. In 2011, the Irish became the first team in NCAA tournament history to defeat both Tennessee and Connecticut in the same run, advancing to the championship game before falling 76–70 to Texas A&M. The following year, the Irish repeated the feat of reaching the title game, though they were defeated 80–61 by Baylor.

The 2012–13 season was a program high: a historic 31–1 record, flawless 16–0 Big East play, and the first Big East Tournament championship achieved with a dramatic 61–59 win over UConn. However, the Irish ultimately lost in the National Semifinals to Connecticut 83–65, ending their season with a 35–2 overall record. Transitioning to the ACC in 2013–14, the Irish reached the national championship game in an undefeated (37–0) campaign, only to succumb 79–58 to UConn (hindered by the loss of one of their top stars, Natalie Achonwa, who had torn her ACL in the Elite Eight).

In 2014–15, Notre Dame again contested for the national title after defeating South Carolina in a nail-bitter in the National Semifinals, 66–65. In the national championship game, they fell 63–53 to UConn for the second straight year. The Irish finished with a 36–3 record and were ranked No. 2 nationally across the final polls.

The defining highlight of the Fighting Irish's modern history arrived in 2017–18, when a seven-player roster overcame adversity to win a second national championship; Junior Arike Ogunbowale delivered consecutive buzzer-beaters—first in the National Semifinals to defeat previously undefeated UConn 91–89 in overtime, then in the title game to beat Mississippi State, 61–58.

The program returned to the Final Four in the 2018–19 season, defeating UConn in the National Semifinals for a second consecutive year, 81–76. In the championship game, the Irish narrowly lost 82–81 to Baylor in a rematch of the 2012 championship game. Over the 2010s decade, Notre Dame appeared in six national championship games, establishing itself as a consistent national powerhouse.

=== Transition and rebuilding (2020–2021) ===
Following Muffet McGraw's retirement in 2020, alumna Niele Ivey—herself a former standout guard and assistant—assumed head coaching duties, becoming the first Black woman to coach any sport at the university. The 2020–21 season was shaped by COVID-19 disruptions and developmental priorities. While this stretch lacked postseason milestones, it laid the foundation for the program's resurgence under Ivey's leadership.

=== Re-emergence and steady progress (2021–2023) ===
Under Ivey's stewardship, Notre Dame steadily regained national prominence. In 2021–22, the Irish advanced to the Sweet Sixteen before falling a close 66–63 to #1-seeded NC State. The 2022–23 season featured an ACC regular-season title and a 27–6 record, with another trip to the Sweet Sixteen—signaling the return of high-level competitiveness. The Irish lost to #2-seeded Maryland in the Sweet Sixteen, 76–59.

=== Return to the summit: ACC title and national excellence (2023–present) ===
In 2023–24, Notre Dame captured the ACC Tournament championship with a 55–51 victory over NC State, earning its sixth ACC title and the first under Ivey's leadership. They were awarded a #2 seed in the NCAA tournament where they advanced to the Sweet Sixteen for a third consecutive year, before falling to #3-seeded Oregon State, 70–65. Freshman guard Hannah Hidalgo was named MVP, showcasing the emerging stars of the roster.

During the 2024–25 season, the Irish ranked sixth nationally and posted early victories—including 102–58 over Purdue and 74–61 at USC—rising to No. 1 briefly. Despite an overtime defeat to NC State, Notre Dame completed a 28–6 (16–2 ACC) regular season, sharing the ACC regular-season title and finishing in the top 10 nationally. In the NCAA Tournament as a No. 3 seed in the Birmingham regional, the Irish advanced to the Sweet Sixteen after defeating Stephen F. Austin 106–54 and Michigan 76–55, before being eliminated by TCU 71–62. Sophomore star Hannah Hidalgo captured both ACC Player of the Year and Defensive Player of the Year, ranking among the nation's best in scoring and steals.

This year, the Irish will tip off their season in Rome. Playing Villanova on November 1st.

=== Legacy and program impact ===
Since the 1981–82 season, Notre Dame holds an overall record of 1,070–351 (.753), with 18 regular-season conference crowns, 12 conference tournament titles, 30 NCAA Tournament appearances, nine Final Fours, and two national championships.

== Awards and honors ==
=== National awards ===
==== Players ====
Naismith College Player of the Year

- Ruth Riley – 2001

AP National Player of the Year

- Ruth Riley – 2001

Sports Illustrated National Player of the Year

- Ruth Riley – 2001

NCAA basketball tournament Most Outstanding Player

- Ruth Riley – 2001
- Arike Ogunbowale – 2018

Nancy Lieberman Award

- Skylar Diggins – 2012, 2013

Elite 90 Award

- Nicole Benz – 2019

==== Coaches ====
Naismith College Coach of the Year

- Muffet McGraw – 2001, 2013, 2014

AP Coach of the Year

- Muffet McGraw – 2001, 2013, 2014, 2018

WBCA Coach of the Year

- Muffet McGraw – 2001, 2013, 2014

USBWA Coach of the Year

- Muffet McGraw – 2001, 2013, 2014

=== Conference awards ===
==== Players ====
ACC Athlete of the Year

- Arike Ogunbowale – 2018

ACC Player of the Year

- Jewell Loyd – 2015
- Hannah Hidalgo – 2025, 2026

ACC Defensive Player of the Year

- Brianna Turner – 2016, 2017, 2019
- Hannah Hidalgo – 2024, 2026

ACC Rookie of the Year

- Brianna Turner – 2015
- Maddy Westbeld – 2021
- Sonia Citron – 2022
- Hannah Hidalgo – 2024

Big East Player of the Year

- Ruth Riley – 2001
- Jacqueline Batteast – 2005
- Skylar Diggins – 2012, 2013

Big East Freshman of the Year

- Alicia Ratay – 2000
- Jacqueline Batteast – 2002
- Jewell Loyd – 2013

Big East Defensive Player of the Year

- Ruth Riley – 1999, 2000, 2001
- Devereaux Peters – 2011, 2012

Midwestern Collegiate Conference/Horizon League Player of the Year

- Karen Robinson – 1990, 1991

North Star Conference Player of the Year

- Trena Keys – 1985, 1986

==== Coaches ====
ACC Coach of the Year

- Muffet McGraw – 2014, 2016
- Niele Ivey – 2023

Big East Coach of the Year

- Muffet McGraw – 2001, 2013

Midwestern Collegiate Conference/Horizon League Coach of the Year

- Muffet McGraw – 1991

North Star Conference Coach of the Year

- Mary DiStanislao – 1985, 1986
- Muffet McGraw – 1988

== Year by year results ==
Record table
Season	Coach	Overall	Conference	Standing	Postseason
Sharon Petro (Independent) (1977–1980)
1977–78	Sharon Petro	13–4	—	—	—
1978–79	Sharon Petro	16–6	—	—	—
1979–80	Sharon Petro	20–10	—	—	—
Petro:		49–20 (.710)			
Mary DiStanislao (Independent) (1980–1983)
1980–81	Mary DiStanislao	10–18	—	—	—
1981–82	Mary DiStanislao	16–9	—	—	—
1982–83	Mary DiStanislao	20–7	—	—	—
Mary DiStanislao (North Star Conference) (1983–1987)
1983–84	Mary DiStanislao	14–14	6–4	—	—
1984–85	Mary DiStanislao	20–8	13–1	1st	—
1985–86	Mary DiStanislao	23–8	13–1	1st	—
1986–87	Mary DiStanislao	12–15	4–2	—	—
DiStanislao:		115–79 (.593)			
Muffet McGraw (North Star Conference) (1987–1988)
1987–88	Muffet McGraw	20–8	7–3	2nd	—
Muffet McGraw (Midwestern Collegiate Conference) (1987–1994)
1988–89	Muffet McGraw	21–11	12–2	T-1st	7th in NWIT
1989–90	Muffet McGraw	23–6	16–0	1st	—
1990–91	Muffet McGraw	23–9	15–1	1st	8th in NWIT
1991–92	Muffet McGraw	14–17	8–4	2nd	NCAA 1st Round
1992–93	Muffet McGraw	15–12	11–5	T-2nd	—
1993–94	Muffet McGraw	22–7	10–2	1st	NCAA 1st Round
1994–95	Muffet McGraw	21–10	15–1	1st	3rd in NWIT
Muffet McGraw (Big East) (1995–2013)
1995–96	Muffet McGraw	23–8	15–3	2nd	NCAA 2nd Round
1996–97	Muffet McGraw	31–7	17–1	2nd	NCAA Final Four
1997–98	Muffet McGraw	22–10	12–6	T-4th	NCAA Sweet Sixteen
1998–99	Muffet McGraw	26–5	15–3	3rd	NCAA 2nd Round
1999–00	Muffet McGraw	27–5	15–1	2nd	NCAA Sweet Sixteen
2000–01	Muffet McGraw	34–2	15–1	T-1st	NCAA Champions
2001–02	Muffet McGraw	20–10	13–3	2nd	NCAA 2nd Round
2002–03	Muffet McGraw	21–11	10–6	5th	NCAA Sweet Sixteen
2003–04	Muffet McGraw	21–11	12–4	T-2nd	NCAA Sweet Sixteen
2004–05	Muffet McGraw	27–6	13–3	T-2nd	NCAA 2nd Round
2005–06	Muffet McGraw	18–12	8–8	10th	NCAA 1st Round
2006–07	Muffet McGraw	20–12	10–6	5th	NCAA 2nd Round
2007–08	Muffet McGraw	25–9	11–5	4th	NCAA Sweet Sixteen
2008–09	Muffet McGraw	22–9	10–6	T-4th	NCAA 1st Round
2009–10	Muffet McGraw	29–6	12–4	T-4th	NCAA Sweet Sixteen
2010–11	Muffet McGraw	31–8	13–3	T-2nd	NCAA Runner-up
2011–12	Muffet McGraw	35–4	15–1	1st	NCAA Runner-up
2012–13	Muffet McGraw	35–2	16–0	1st	NCAA Final Four
Muffet McGraw (Atlantic Coast Conference) (2013–2020)
2013–14	Muffet McGraw	37–1	16–0	1st	NCAA Runner-up
2014–15	Muffet McGraw	36–3	15–1	1st	NCAA Runner-up
2015–16	Muffet McGraw	33–2	16–0	1st	NCAA Sweet Sixteen
2016–17	Muffet McGraw	33–4	15–1	1st	NCAA Elite Eight
2017–18	Muffet McGraw	35–3	15–1	T-1st	NCAA Champions
2018–19	Muffet McGraw	35–4	14–2	T-1st	NCAA Runner-Up
2019–20	Muffet McGraw	13–18	8–10	T-9th	Postseason cancelled (Note: Due to the COVID-19 pandemic, the 2020 NCAA tournament was cancelled entirely.)
Muffet McGraw:		848–248 (.774)	245–89 (.734)		
Niele Ivey (ACC) (2020–present)
2020–21	Niele Ivey	10–10	8–7	6th	
2021–22	Niele Ivey	24–10	13–5	T-3rd	NCAA Sweet Sixteen
2022–23	Niele Ivey	27–6	15–3	1st	NCAA Sweet Sixteen
2023–24	Niele Ivey	28–7	13–5	T-2nd	NCAA Sweet Sixteen
2024–25	Niele Ivey	28–6	16–2	T-1st	NCAA Sweet Sixteen
2025–26	Niele Ivey	25–11	12–6	T-5th	NCAA Elite Eight
Niele Ivey:		142–49 (.743)	77–28 (.747)		
Total:		1,154–396 (.745)			
National champion Postseason invitational champion Conference regular season champion Conference regular season and conference tournament champion Division regular season champion Division regular season and conference tournament champion Conference tournament champion

== NCAA Tournament history ==
Notre Dame has played in the NCAA Division I women's basketball tournament 31 times. They have a record of 78–29.

Year	Seed	Round	Opponent	Result
1992	#12	Round of 64	#5 UCLA	L 72–93
1994	#7	Round of 64	#10 Minnesota	L 76–81
1996	#12	Round of 64; Round of 32	#5 Purdue #4 Texas Tech	W 73–60; L 67–82
1997	#6	Round of 64; Round of 32; Sweet Sixteen; Elite Eight; Final Four	#11 Memphis #3 Texas #2 Alabama #5 George Washington #3 Tennessee	W 93–62; W 86–83; W 87–81; W 62–52; L 66–80
1998	#9	Round of 64; Round of 32; Sweet Sixteen	#8 Southwest Missouri State #1 Texas Tech #4 Purdue	W 78–64; W 62–52; L 65–70
1999	#5	Round of 64; Round of 32	#12 Saint Mary's (Calif) #4 LSU	W 61–57; L 64–74
2000	#2	Round of 64; Round of 32; Sweet Sixteen	#15 San Diego #7 George Washington #3 Texas Tech	W 87–61; W 95–60; L 65–69
2001	#1	Round of 64; Round of 32; Sweet Sixteen; Elite Eight; Final Four; National Championship	#16 Alcorn State #8 Michigan #5 Utah #3 Vanderbilt #1 Connecticut #3 Purdue	W 98–49; W 88–54; W 69–54; W 72–64; W 90–75; W 68–66
2002	#7	Round of 64; Round of 32	#10 New Mexico #2 Tennessee	W 58–44; L 50–89
2003	#11	Round of 64; Round of 32; Sweet Sixteen	#6 Arizona #3 Kansas State #2 Purdue	W 59–47; W 59–53; L 47–66
2004	#5	Round of 64; Round of 32; Sweet Sixteen	#5 Southwest Missouri State #13 Middle Tennessee #1 Penn State	W 69–65^{OT} W 59–46; L 49–55
2005	#4	Round of 64; Round of 32	#13 Santa Barbara #5 Arizona State	W 61–51; L 61–70
2006	#9	Round of 64	#8 Boston College	L 61–78
2007	#9	Round of 64; Round of 32	#8 California #1 North Carolina	W 62–59; L 51–60
2008	#5	Round of 64; Round of 32; Sweet Sixteen	#12 SMU #4 Oklahoma #1 Tennessee	W 75–62; W 79–75^{OT} L 64–74
2009	#7	Round of 64	#10 Minnesota	L 71–79
2010	#2	Round of 64; Round of 32; Sweet Sixteen	#15 Cleveland State #10 Vermont #3 Oklahoma	W 86–58; W 84–66; L 72–77^{OT}
2011	#2	Round of 64; Round of 32; Sweet Sixteen; Elite Eight; Final Four; National Championship	#15 Utah #10 Temple #6 Oklahoma #1 Tennessee #1 Connecticut #2 Texas A&M	W 67–54; W 77–64; W 78–53; W 73–59; W 72–63; L 70–76
2012	#1	Round of 64; Round of 32; Sweet Sixteen; Elite Eight; Final Four; National Championship	#16 Liberty #8 California #5 St. Bonaventure #2 Maryland #1 Connecticut #1 Baylor	W 74–43; W 73–62; W 79–35; W 80–49; W 83–75^{OT} L 61–80
2013	#1	Round of 64; Round of 32; Sweet Sixteen; Elite Eight; Final Four	#16 Tennessee-Martin #9 Iowa #12 Kansas #2 Duke #1 Connecticut	W 97–64; W 74–57; W 93–63; W 87–76; L 65–83
2014	#1	Round of 64; Round of 32; Sweet Sixteen; Elite Eight; Final Four; National Championship	#16 Robert Morris #9 Arizona State #5 Oklahoma State #2 Baylor #4 Maryland #1 Connecticut	W 93–42; W 84–67; W 89–72; W 88–69; W 87–61; L 58–79
2015	#1	Round of 64; Round of 32; Sweet Sixteen; Elite Eight; Final Four; National Championship	#16 Montana #9 DePaul #4 Stanford #2 Baylor #1 South Carolina #1 Connecticut	W 77–43; W 79–67; W 81–60; W 77–68; W 66–65; L 53–63
2016	#1	Round of 64; Round of 32; Sweet Sixteen	#16 North Carolina A&T #9 Indiana #4 Stanford	W 95–61; W 87–70; L 84–90
2017	#1	Round of 64; Round of 32; Sweet Sixteen; Elite Eight	#16 Robert Morris #9 Purdue #5 Ohio State #2 Stanford	W 79–49; W 88–82^{OT} W 99–76; L 75–76
2018	#1	Round of 64; Round of 32; Sweet Sixteen; Elite Eight; Final Four; National Championship	#16 Cal-State Northridge #9 Villanova #4 Texas A&M #2 Oregon #1 Connecticut #1 Mississippi St.	W 99–81; W 98–72; W 90–84; W 84–74; W 91–89^{OT} W 61–58
2019	#1	Round of 64; Round of 32; Sweet Sixteen; Elite Eight; Final Four; National Championship	#16 Bethune-Cookman #9 Michigan State #4 Texas A&M #2 Stanford #2 Connecticut #1 Baylor	W 92–50; W 91–63; W 87–80; W 84–68; W 81–76; L 81–82
2022	#5	Round of 64; Round of 32; Sweet Sixteen	#12 UMass #4 Oklahoma #1 NC State	W 89–78; W 108–64; L 63–66
2023	#3	Round of 64; Round of 32; Sweet Sixteen	#14 Southern Utah #11 Mississippi State #2 Maryland	W 82–56; W 53–48; L 59–76
2024	#2	Round of 64; Round of 32; Sweet Sixteen	#14Kent State #7 Ole Miss #3 Oregon State	W 81–67; W 71–56; L 65–70
2025	#3	Round of 64; Round of 32; Sweet Sixteen	#14 Stephen F. Austin #6 Michigan #2 TCU	W 106–54; W 76–55; L 62–71
2026	#6	Round of 64; Round of 32; Sweet Sixteen; Elite Eight	#11 Fairfield #3 Ohio State #2 Vanderbilt #1 UConn	W 79–60; W 83–73; W 67–64; L 52–70

The following lists where the Fighting Irish have been seeded in the NCAA tournament.

Years →	'92	'94	'96	'97	'98	'99	'00	'01	'02	'03	'04	'05	'06	'07	'08	'09	'10	'11	'12	'13	'14	'15	'16	'17	'18	'19	'22	'23	'24	'25	'26
Seeds →	12	7	12	6	9	5	2	1	7	11	5	4	9	9	5	7	2	2	1	1	1	1	1	1	1	1	5	3	2	3	6

== Roster ==
2026–27 Notre Dame Fighting Irish women's basketball team
Players
Coaches

Pos.	#	Name	Height	Year	Previous school	Hometown
G	1	Kelly Ratigan	5 ft 8 in (1.73 m)	GS	Loyola (MD)	South Bend, IN
G/F	2	Jacy Abii	6 ft 2 in (1.88 m)	Fr	Legion Prep	Dallas, TX
G	3	Hannah Hidalgo	5 ft 7 in (1.7 m)	Sr	Paul VI	Merchantville, NJ
G	5	Bella Ragone	6 ft 2 in (1.88 m)	Fr	Mill Creek	Buford, GA
F	6	Isabella Sangha	6 ft 3 in (1.91 m)	Fr	St. Thomas Aquinas	Fort Lauderdale, FL
G	7	Maya Gin	5 ft 9 in (1.75 m)	So	Hinsdale Central	Clarendon Hills, IL
F	9	Anaya Hardy	6 ft 3 in (1.91 m)	Jr	Louisville	Detroit, MI
G	10	Jenica Lewis	5 ft 10 in (1.78 m)	Fr	Johnston	Johnston, IA
G	23	Madison St. Rose	5 ft 10 in (1.78 m)	GS	Princeton	Old Bridge Township, NJ
G/F	24	Amari Byles	6 ft 2 in (1.88 m)	Fr	Kingdom Collegiate	DeSoto, TX
G	30	Bella Veith	5 ft 6 in (1.68 m)	Fr	Mount Notre Dame	Cincinnati, OH
G	32	Mia Veith	5 ft 6 in (1.68 m)	Fr	Mount Notre Dame	Cincinnati, OH
F	44	Leah Macy	6 ft 2 in (1.88 m)	So	Bethlehem	Elizabethtown, KY

Head coach

- Niele Ivey (Notre Dame)

Assistant coach(es)

- Carol Owens (Northern Illinois)
- Charel Allen (Notre Dame)
- Carlos Knox (IUPUI)
- Jared Newson (UT Martin)

Legend

- (C) Team captain
- (S) Suspended
- (I) Ineligible
- (W) Walk-on
- Injured
- Current redshirt

Roster
Last update: September 27, 2026
