= Kristy Curry =

American women's college basketball coach

Current position
- Title: Head coach
- Team: South Florida
- Conference: American
- Record: 0–0 (–)

Biographical details
- Born: October 29, 1966 (age 60); Olla, Louisiana, U.S.
- Education: Northeast Louisiana ('88)

Coaching career (HC unless noted)
- 1988–1990: Weston HS
- 1990–1991: Mansfield HS
- 1991–1993: Tulane (asst.)
- 1993–1994: Stephen F. Austin (asst.)
- 1994–1996: Texas A&M (asst.)
- 1996–1999: Louisiana Tech (asst.)
- 1999–2006: Purdue
- 2006–2013: Texas Tech
- 2013–2026: Alabama
- 2026–present: South Florida

Head coaching record
- Overall: 554–322 (.632)
- Tournaments: 20–15 (NCAA); 14–7 (WNIT)

Accomplishments and honors

Championships
- 3x Big Ten tournament (2000, 2003, 2004); 2x Big Ten regular season (2001, 2002); NCAA Regional—Final Four (2001)

Awards
- Kay Yow Heart of a Coach Award (2014)

Kristy Lynn Curry (née Sims; born October 30, 1966) is the current head coach of the South Florida Bulls women's basketball team. She took the job in 2026. Kristy grew up in Olla, Louisiana and graduated from LaSalle High School.

== Coaching career ==
Curry graduated from Northeast Louisiana University in 1988. Her career started with coaching jobs at Weston and Mansfield High Schools in her home state of Louisiana. She held several college assistant coaching jobs, including Tulane, Stephen F. Austin, Texas A&M, and Louisiana Tech. Immediately prior to taking her position with the Lady Raiders on March 30, 2006, she was the head coach of Purdue's women's basketball team. In addition to two Big Ten championships, she led the Boilermakers to seven consecutive appearances in the NCAA tournament, including four appearances in the Sweet Sixteen, two appearances in the Elite Eight, one appearance in the Final Four, and one appearance in the national championship game (2001).

As head coach of the Texas Tech Lady Raiders, following the retirement of Hall of Fame coach Marsha Sharp, Curry embarked upon a rebuilding program as her tenure began in 2006, facing the challenges of new-era recruiting and the increased talent prevalent in the Big 12 Conference, especially Big 12 South opponents Baylor, Oklahoma, Texas, and Texas A&M, all of whom were frequently ranked in the Top 25 and contending for the national championship. In her first six years at Texas Tech, Curry led the Lady Raiders to three appearances in the Women's National Invitational Tournament.

In January 2011, the Lady Raiders ascended to #26 in the AP national rankings (#25 in the Coaches' Poll), and on February 19, 2011, in the United Spirit Arena, the Lady Raiders upset the #1-ranked Baylor Bears. In the regular-season finale on March 5, 2011, Texas Tech defeated the #18 Oklahoma Sooners for the Lady Raiders' third victory over a ranked opponent in seventeen days. Texas Tech accepted an invitation to the NCAA Tournament.

In March 2011, Curry signed a five-year contract extension with Texas Tech. Under Curry's leadership, the Lady Raiders began the 2011–12 season with 14 straight victories and were ranked #10 in the AP poll in early January 2012.

On January 9, 2013, Curry reached her 300th career victory, with a win over the Kansas State Wildcats with a score of 59–50 on her home court in Lubbock, Texas, with a career record of 300–141 (.680) at the time. Curry guided the Texas Tech Lady Raiders to the 2013 NCAA Tournament, their second appearance in three years in the tournament.

Curry accepted the same position at The University of Alabama on May 11, 2013, and replaced former Crimson Tide basketball star Wendell Hudson as head coach.

The 2023-24 season would prove to be Curry's best season at Alabama, as the Tide went 23-8 and 10-6 in the SEC and also clinched a 4th seed and double bye in the SEC Tournament. Sarah Ashlee Barker was named to the All-SEC first team and Aaliyah Nye was named to the All-SEC second team. The Tide received an invite to the NCAA Tournament, where they advanced to the Second Round. Additionally, Aaliyah Nye would break the single-season three-pointer record previously held by Brittany Davis during the 2021-22 season.

== Head coaching record ==
Record table
| Season | Team | Overall | Conference | Standing | Postseason |
|---|---|---|---|---|---|
Purdue Boilermakers (Big Ten Conference) (1999–2006)
| 1999–2000 | Purdue | 23–8 | 11–5 | T–3rd | NCAA Second Round |
| 2000–01 | Purdue | 31–7 | 14–2 | 1st | NCAA Runner-Up |
| 2001–02 | Purdue | 24–6 | 13–3 | 1st | NCAA Second Round |
| 2002–03 | Purdue | 29–6 | 12–4 | T–2nd | NCAA Elite Eight |
| 2003–04 | Purdue | 29–4 | 14–2 | 2nd | NCAA Sweet Sixteen |
| 2004–05 | Purdue | 17–13 | 9–7 | 5th | NCAA Second Round |
| 2005–06 | Purdue | 26–7 | 13–3 | 2nd | NCAA Sweet Sixteen |
| Purdue: | | 179–51 (.778) | 86–26 (.768) | | |
Texas Tech Lady Raiders (Big 12 Conference) (2006–2013)
| 2006–07 | Texas Tech | 15–16 | 6–10 | T–7th | |
| 2007–08 | Texas Tech | 17–16 | 4–12 | T–10th | WNIT Third Round |
| 2008–09 | Texas Tech | 16–15 | 6–10 | T–7th | |
| 2009–10 | Texas Tech | 18–15 | 5–11 | T–8th | WNIT Second Round |
| 2010–11 | Texas Tech | 22–11 | 8–8 | 6th | NCAA First Round |
| 2011–12 | Texas Tech | 21–14 | 6–12 | 9th | WNIT Third Round |
| 2012–13 | Texas Tech | 21–11 | 11–7 | T–3rd | NCAA First Round |
| Texas Tech: | | 130–98 (.570) | 46–70 (.397) | | |
Alabama Crimson Tide (Southeastern Conference) (2013–2026)
| 2013–14 | Alabama | 14–16 | 7–9 | T–6th | |
| 2014–15 | Alabama | 13–19 | 2–14 | 14th | |
| 2015–16 | Alabama | 15–16 | 4–12 | 12th | WNIT First Round |
| 2016–17 | Alabama | 22–14 | 5–11 | T-11th | WNIT Quarterfinals |
| 2017–18 | Alabama | 20–14 | 7–9 | 8th | WNIT Quarterfinals |
| 2018–19 | Alabama | 14–17 | 5–11 | 11th | |
| 2019–20 | Alabama | 18–12 | 8–8 | 8th | |
| 2020–21 | Alabama | 17–10 | 8–8 | 7th | NCAA Second Round |
| 2021–22 | Alabama | 20–14 | 6–10 | T–10th | WNIT Quarterfinals |
| 2022–23 | Alabama | 20–11 | 9–7 | T–5th | NCAA First Round |
| 2023–24 | Alabama | 24–10 | 10–6 | T–4th | NCAA Second Round |
| 2024–25 | Alabama | 24–9 | 10–6 | T–6th | NCAA Second Round |
| 2025–26 | Alabama | 24–11 | 7–9 | T–10th | NCAA Second Round |
| Alabama: | | 245–173 (.586) | 88–120 (.423) | | |
South Florida Bulls (American Athletic Conference) (2026–present)
| 2026–27 | South Florida | 0–0 | 0–0 | | |
| South Florida: | | 0–0 (–) | 0–0 (–) | | |
| Total: | | 554–322 (.632) | | | |
National champion Postseason invitational champion Conference regular season champion Conference regular season and conference tournament champion Division regular season champion Division regular season and conference tournament champion Conference tournament champion
