= Naismith College Coach of the Year =

American college basketball coach award

- Awarded for: the most outstanding men's and women's basketball head coaches in NCAA Division I
- Country: United States
- Presented by: Atlanta Tipoff Club

History
- First award: 1987
- Most recent: Tommy Lloyd, Arizona (men); Shea Ralph, Vanderbilt (women)
- Website: Official website

The Naismith College Coach of the Year Award (officially known for sponsorship reasons as the Werner Ladder Naismith College Coach of the Year) is an award given by the Atlanta Tipoff Club to one men's and one women's NCAA Division I head college basketball coaches each season. The award, created in 1987, was originally given to the two winning coaches of the NCAA Division I basketball tournament for the first two years of its existence. In 1989, the Naismith Award's governing board switched to a voting process to determine the winners.

The men's side has had five multiple-time winners: John Calipari and Mike Krzyzewski with three each, and Tony Bennett, Mark Few, and Jay Wright with two each. On the women's side, there have also been five multiple-time winners: Geno Auriemma with eight, Pat Summitt with five, Dawn Staley with four, and Muffet McGraw and Tara VanDerveer with three each.

== Key ==
Coach (X)	Denotes the number of times the coach has been awarded the Naismith Coach of the Year Award at that point
W, L, W %	Total wins, total losses, win percentage
Finish	National postseason tournament result
C	Denotes national championship season

== Winners ==
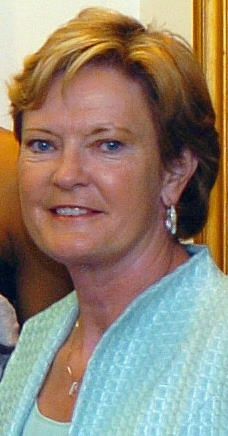
Pat Summitt, Tennessee, 5× winner

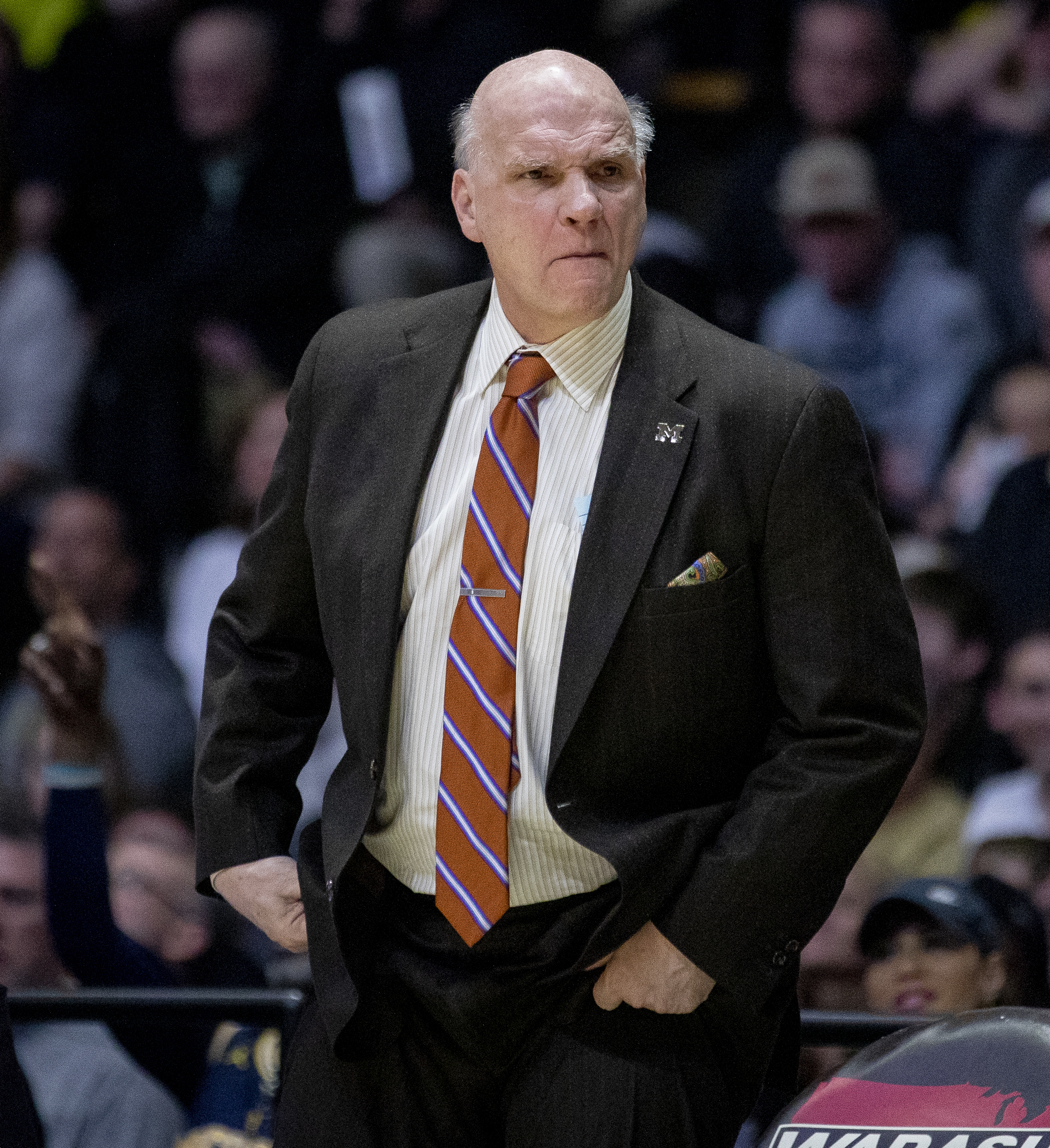
Phil Martelli, Saint Joseph's, 2004

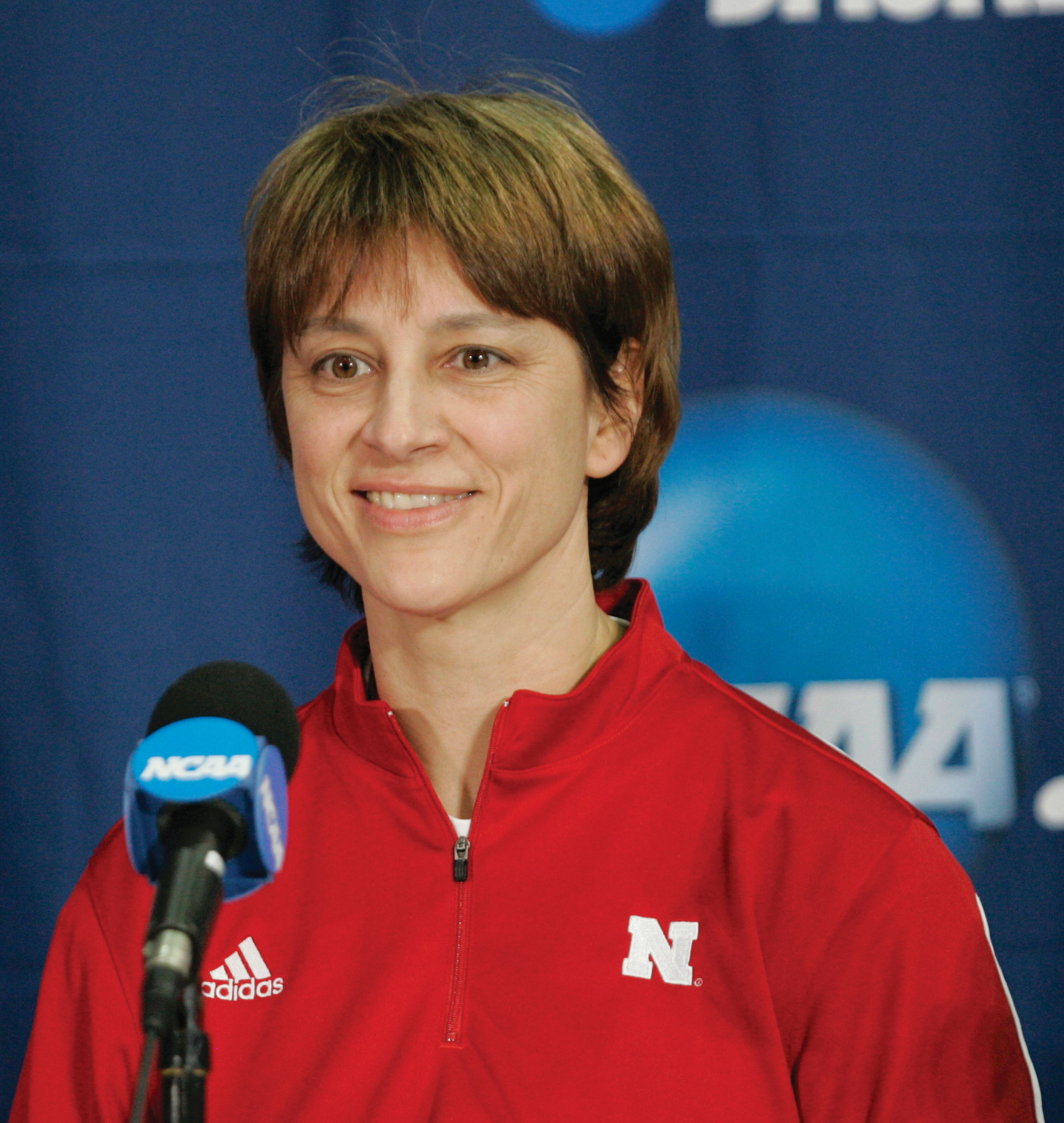
Connie Yori, Nebraska, 2010

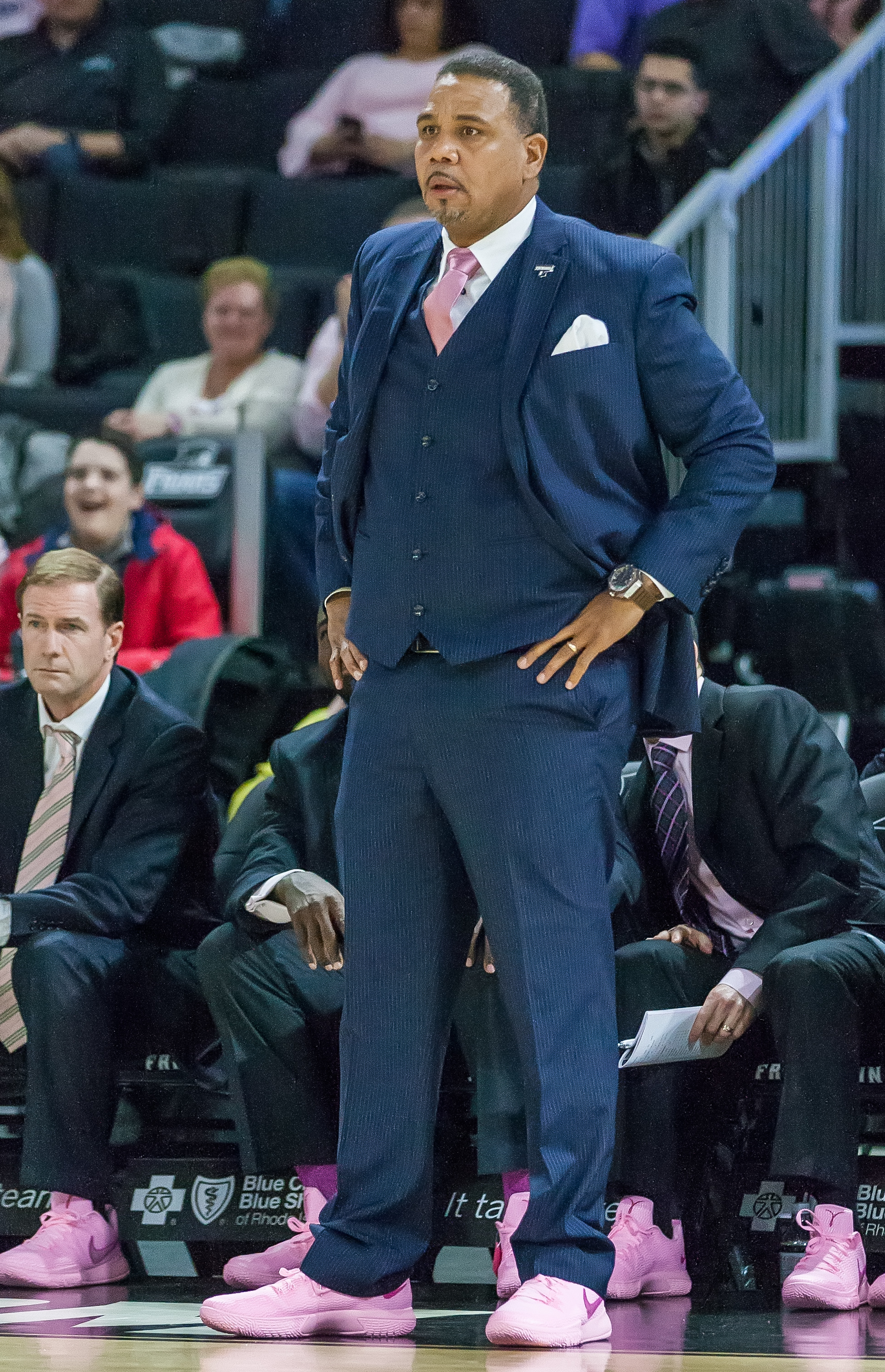
Ed Cooley, Providence, 2022

Men
Season	Coach	School	W	L	W %	Finish	Reference
1986–87	Bob Knight	Indiana	30	4	.882	NCAA champion^{C}	
1987–88	Larry Brown	Kansas	27	11	.711	NCAA champion^{C}	
1988–89	Mike Krzyzewski	Duke	28	8	.778	NCAA Final Four	
1989–90	Bobby Cremins	Georgia Tech	28	7	.800	NCAA Final Four	
1990–91	Randy Ayers	Ohio State	27	4	.871	NCAA Sweet Sixteen	
1991–92	Mike Krzyzewski (2)	Duke	34	2	.944	NCAA champion^{C}	
1992–93	Dean Smith	North Carolina	34	4	.895	NCAA champion^{C}	
1993–94	Nolan Richardson	Arkansas	31	3	.912	NCAA champion^{C}	
1994–95	Jim Harrick	UCLA	31	2	.939	NCAA champion^{C}	
1995–96	John Calipari	UMass	35^{[a]}	2^{[a]}	.946^{[a]}	NCAA Final Four^{[a]}	
1996–97	Roy Williams	Kansas	34	2	.944	NCAA Sweet Sixteen	
1997–98	Bill Guthridge	North Carolina	34	4	.895	NCAA Final Four	
1998–99	Mike Krzyzewski (3)	Duke	37	2	.949	NCAA runners-up	
1999–00	Mike Montgomery	Stanford	27	4	.871	NCAA second round	
2000–01	Rod Barnes	Ole Miss	27	8	.771	NCAA Sweet Sixteen	
2001–02	Ben Howland	Pittsburgh	29	6	.829	NCAA Sweet Sixteen	
2002–03	Tubby Smith	Kentucky	32	4	.889	NCAA Elite Eight	
2003–04	Phil Martelli	Saint Joseph's	30	2	.938	NCAA Elite Eight	
2004–05	Bruce Weber	Illinois	37	2	.949	NCAA runners-up	
2005–06	Jay Wright	Villanova	28	5	.848	NCAA Elite Eight	
2006–07	Tony Bennett	Washington State	26	8	.765	NCAA second round	
2007–08	John Calipari (2)	Memphis	38^{[b]}	2^{[b]}	.950^{[b]}	NCAA runners-up^{[b]}	
2008–09	Jamie Dixon	Pittsburgh	31	5	.861	NCAA Elite Eight	
2009–10	Jim Boeheim	Syracuse	30	5	.857	NCAA Sweet Sixteen	
2010–11	Steve Fisher	San Diego State	34	3	.919	NCAA Sweet Sixteen	
2011–12	Bill Self	Kansas	32	7	.821	NCAA runners-up	
2012–13	Jim Larrañaga	Miami (Florida)	29	7	.806	NCAA Sweet Sixteen	
2013–14	Gregg Marshall	Wichita State	35	1	.972	NCAA round of 32^{[c]}	
2014–15	John Calipari (3)	Kentucky	38	1	.974	NCAA Final Four	
2015–16	Jay Wright (2)	Villanova	35	5	.875	NCAA champion^{C}	
2016–17	Mark Few	Gonzaga	37	2	.949	NCAA runners-up	
2017–18	Tony Bennett (2)	Virginia	31	3	.912	NCAA round of 64	
2018–19	Rick Barnes	Tennessee	31	6	.838	NCAA Sweet Sixteen	
2019–20	Anthony Grant	Dayton	29	2	.935	N/A^{[d]}	
2020–21	Mark Few (2)	Gonzaga	31	1	.969	NCAA runners-up	
2021–22	Ed Cooley	Providence	27	6	.818	NCAA Sweet Sixteen	
2022–23	Jerome Tang	Kansas State	26	10	.722	NCAA Elite Eight	
2023–24	Dan Hurley	UConn	37	3	.925	NCAA champion^{C}	
2024–25	Rick Pitino	St. John's	31	5	.861	NCAA round of 32	
2025–26	Tommy Lloyd	Arizona	36	3	.923	NCAA Final Four	

Women
Season	Coach	School	W	L	W %	Finish	Reference
1986–87	Pat Summitt	Tennessee	28	6	.824	NCAA champion^{C}	
1987–88	Leon Barmore	Louisiana Tech	32	2	.941	NCAA champion^{C}	
1988–89	Pat Summitt (2)	Tennessee	35	2	.946	NCAA champion^{C}	
1989–90	Tara VanDerveer	Stanford	32	1	.970	NCAA champion^{C}	
1990–91	Debbie Ryan	Virginia	31	3	.912	NCAA runners-up	
1991–92	Chris Weller	Maryland	25	6	.806	NCAA Elite Eight	
1992–93	C. Vivian Stringer	Iowa	27	4	.871	NCAA Final Four	
1993–94	Pat Summitt (3)	Tennessee	31	2	.939	NCAA Sweet Sixteen	
1994–95	Geno Auriemma	UConn	35	0	1.000	NCAA champion^{C}	
1995–96	Andy Landers	Georgia	28	5	.848	NCAA runners-up	
1996–97	Geno Auriemma (2)	UConn	33	1	.971	NCAA Elite Eight	
1997–98	Pat Summitt (4)	Tennessee	39	0	1.000	NCAA champion^{C}	
1998–99	Carolyn Peck	Purdue	34	1	.971	NCAA champion^{C}	
1999–00	Geno Auriemma (3)	UConn	36	1	.973	NCAA champion^{C}	
2000–01	Muffet McGraw	Notre Dame	34	2	.944	NCAA champion^{C}	
2001–02	Geno Auriemma (4)	UConn	39	0	1.000	NCAA champion^{C}	
2002–03	Gail Goestenkors	Duke	35	2	.946	NCAA Final Four	
2003–04	Pat Summitt (5)	Tennessee	31	4	.886	NCAA runners-up	
2004–05	Pokey Chatman	LSU	33	3	.917	NCAA Final Four	
2005–06	Sylvia Hatchell	North Carolina	34	4	.895	NCAA Final Four	
2006–07	Gail Goestenkors (2)	Duke	32	2	.941	NCAA Sweet Sixteen	
2007–08	Geno Auriemma (5)	UConn	36	2	.947	NCAA Final Four	
2008–09	Geno Auriemma (6)	UConn	39	0	1.000	NCAA champion^{C}	
2009–10	Connie Yori	Nebraska	32	2	.941	NCAA Sweet Sixteen	
2010–11	Tara VanDerveer (2)	Stanford	33	3	.917	NCAA Final Four	
2011–12	Kim Mulkey	Baylor	40	0	1.000	NCAA champion^{C}	
2012–13	Muffet McGraw (2)	Notre Dame	35	2	.946	NCAA Final Four	
2013–14	Muffet McGraw (3)	Notre Dame	37	1	.974	NCAA Final Four	
2014–15	Courtney Banghart	Princeton	31	1	.969	NCAA second round^{[c]}	
2015–16	Geno Auriemma (7)	UConn	38	0	1.000	NCAA champion^{C}	
2016–17	Geno Auriemma (8)	UConn	36	1	.973	NCAA Final Four	
2017–18	Vic Schaefer	Mississippi State	37	2	.949	NCAA runners-up	
2018–19	Lisa Bluder	Iowa	29	7	.806	NCAA Elite Eight	
2019–20	Dawn Staley	South Carolina	32	1	.970	N/A^{[d]}	
2020–21	Tara VanDerveer (3)	Stanford	31	2	.939	NCAA champion^{C}	
2021–22	Dawn Staley (2)	South Carolina	35	2	.946	NCAA champion^{C}	
2022–23	Dawn Staley (3)	South Carolina	36	1	.973	NCAA Final Four	
2023–24	Dawn Staley (4)	South Carolina	38	0	1.000	NCAA champion^{C}	
2024–25	Cori Close	UCLA	34	3	.919	NCAA Final Four	
2025–26	Shea Ralph	Vanderbilt	29	5	.853	NCAA Sweet Sixteen	

- ^{a} On May 8, 1997, the NCAA Executive Committee voted to negate the Minutemen's 1996 NCAA tournament record, for Marcus Camby's acceptance of agents' improper gifts. The 35–2 record was reduced to 31–1, and the UMass slot in the Final Four is officially denoted as vacated.
- ^{b} An NCAA investigation determined that Derrick Rose had forfeited his eligibility because the Educational Testing Service voided his SAT Reasoning Test score which made him eligible to play. The NCAA also determined that even without the questions about Rose's SAT score, Rose would have lost his eligibility in December 2007 due to his brother being allowed to travel with the team for free. All 38 wins and one 2008 NCAA tournament loss were subsequently vacated by the NCAA for rules violations, leaving the team with an official record of 0–1.
- ^{c} The NCAA men's tournament expanded to 68 teams starting in 2011, with the last four teams earning bids into the tournament set in competition with one another via "First Four" play-in games. The 'second round' then became more commonly referred to as 'round of 32' for specificity. On the women's side, 2022 was the first NCAA tournament in which 68 teams earned bids.
- ^{d} The COVID-19 pandemic caused the 2019–20 men's and women's seasons to be canceled prior to any national postseason tournaments occurring.

== See also ==
- Naismith College Player of the Year
