= 2000–01 Southwest Missouri State Lady Bears basketball team =

Women's college basketball season

2000–01 Southwest Missouri State Lady Bears basketball

MVC tournament champions MVC regular season co-champions

NCAA tournament, Final Four
- Conference: Missouri Valley Conference

Ranking
- Coaches: No. 4
- AP: No. 15
- Record: 29–6 (16–2 MVC)
- Head coach: Cheryl Burnett (14th season)
- Assistant coaches: Marla Douglass; Jim Middleton; Lynette Robinson
- Home arena: Hammons Student Center

2000–01 Missouri Valley Conference women's basketball standings
	Conf.				Overall
Team	W		L	PCT	W		L	PCT
No. 15 SW Missouri State †	16	–	2	.889	29	–	6	.829
Drake	16	–	2	.889	23	–	7	.767
Northern Iowa	12	–	6	.667	18	–	11	.621
Creighton	11	–	7	.611	17	–	11	.607
Evansville	8	–	10	.444	13	–	15	.464
Wichita State	8	–	10	.444	10	–	17	.370
Indiana State	7	–	11	.389	10	–	18	.357
Bradley	5	–	13	.278	10	–	17	.370
Southern Illinois	4	–	14	.222	7	–	20	.259
Illinois State	3	–	15	.167	5	–	22	.185
† 2001 MVC tournament winner Rankings from AP poll

The 2000–01 Southwest Missouri State Lady Bears basketball team represented Southwest Missouri State University during the 2000–01 NCAA Division I women's basketball season. The Lady Bears, led by 14th-year head coach Cheryl Burnett, played their home games at Hammons Student Center and were members of the Missouri Valley Conference.

They finished the season 29–6 and 16–2 in conference play to tie for the regular season MVC title. As the number two seed in the 2001 Missouri Valley Conference women's basketball tournament conference tournament, they defeated Indiana State, Northern Iowa, and Drake to take home the MVC tournament championship. They received an automatic bid to the NCAA tournament and were assigned the No. 5 seed in the West region. They defeated No. 12 seed Toledo, No. 4 seed Rutgers, No. 1 seed Duke, and No. 6 seed Washington to reach the second Final Four in program history. The Lady Bears were defeated by Purdue in the National semifinals.

Southwest Missouri State spent the entire season ranked in both major polls. The team was ranked in the top 15 for nine weeks, and had a final ranking in the Coaches poll of No. 4.

== Roster ==
2000–01 Missouri State Bears women's basketball team
Players
Coaches

Pos.	#	Name	Height	Year	Previous school	Hometown
G	10	Jackie Stiles (C)	5 ft 8 in (1.73 m)	Sr	Claflin	Claflin, Kansas
G	15	Tara Mitchem	5 ft 9 in (1.75 m)	Sr	Ohio State; Glendale	Springfield, Missouri
G/F	33	Carly Deer	6 ft 0 in (1.83 m)	Sr	Warrensburg	Warrensburg, Missouri
C	40	Erika Rante	6 ft 4 in (1.93 m)	Jr

Head coach

- Cheryl Burnett (Kansas)

Assistant coach(es)

- Marla Douglass
- Jim Middleton
- Lynette Robinson

Legend

- (C) Team captain
- (S) Suspended
- (I) Ineligible
- (W) Walk-on
- Injured
- Current redshirt

Roster

== Schedule ==
Date time, TV	Rank^{#}	Opponent^{#}	Result	Record	Site (attendance) city, state
Regular season
Dec 1, 2000*	No. 18	at No. 19 Oklahoma	L 82–89	4–2	Lloyd Noble Center; Norman, Oklahoma
Dec 7, 2000*	No. 18	Iowa	W 101–87	6–2	Hammons Student Center; Springfield, Missouri
Dec 16, 2000*	No. 21	No. 17 Oklahoma	W 69–61	7–2	Hammons Student Center; Springfield, Missouri
Dec 30, 2000	No. 16	at Creighton	W 84–59	8–2 (1–0)	Omaha Civic Auditorium; Omaha, Nebraska
Jan 1, 2001	No. 16	at Drake	L 63–66	8–3 (1–1)	Veterans Memorial Auditorium; Des Moines, Iowa
Jan 29, 2001*	No. 20	at Western Kentucky	L 69–74	15–4	E. A. Diddle Arena; Bowling Green, Kentucky
Feb 11, 2001	No. 18	Evansville	W 91–65	18–4 (12–1)	Hammons Student Center; Springfield, Missouri
Feb 16, 2001	No. 18	Bradley	W 81–55	19–4 (13–1)	Hammons Student Center; Springfield, Missouri
Feb 18, 2001	No. 18	at Northern Iowa	L 80–99	19–5 (13–2)	UNI-Dome; Cedar Falls, Iowa
Feb 25, 2001	No. 21	at Wichita State	W 89–85 ^{OT}	20–5 (14–2)	Levitt Arena; Wichita, Kansas
Mar 1, 2001	No. 18	Creighton	W 94–59	21–5 (15–2)	Hammons Student Center; Springfield, Missouri
Mar 3, 2001	No. 18	Drake	W 87–63	22–5 (16–2)	Hammons Student Center; Springfield, Missouri
MVC tournament
Mar 8, 2001*	(2) No. 16	(7) Indiana State; Quarterfinals	W 92–63	23–5	Hammons Student Center; Springfield, Missouri
Mar 9, 2001*	(2) No. 16	(3) Northern Iowa; Semifinals	W 86–54	24–5	Hammons Student Center; Springfield, Missouri
Mar 10, 2001*	(2) No. 16	(1) Drake; Championship game	W 84–69	25–5	Hammons Student Center; Springfield, Missouri
NCAA tournament
Mar 17, 2001*	(5 W) No. 15	vs. (12 W) Toledo; First round	W 89–71	26–5	Louis Brown Athletic Center; Piscataway, NJ
Mar 19, 2001*	(5 W) No. 15	at (4 W) No. 11 Rutgers; Second round	W 60–53	27–5	Louis Brown Athletic Center; Piscataway, NJ
Mar 24, 2001*	(5 W) No. 15	vs. (1 W) No. 5 Duke; Regional Semifinal – Sweet Sixteen	W 81–71	28–5	Spokane Veterans Memorial Arena; Spokane, WA
Mar 26, 2001*	(5 W) No. 15	vs. (6 W) Washington; Regional Final – Elite Eight	W 104–87	29–5	Spokane Veterans Memorial Arena; Spokane, WA
Mar 30, 2001*	(5 W) No. 15	vs. (3 ME) No. 9 Purdue; National Semifinal – Final Four	L 64–81	29–6	Savvis Center; St. Louis, Missouri
*Non-conference game. ^{#}Rankings from AP Poll. (#) Tournament seedings in parentheses. MW=Midwest. All times are in Central Time.

== Rankings ==
Ranking movements Legend: ██ Increase in ranking ██ Decrease in ranking
	Week																		
Poll	Pre	1	2	3	4	5	6	7	8	9	10	11	12	13	14	15	16	17	Final
AP	21	21	17	13	18	21	18	16	15	15	14	13	13	15	15	20	18	16	15
Coaches	21	21	16	13	17	18	15	15	14	14	14	12	13	14	13	16	16	16	4

== Awards and honors ==
- Jackie Stiles – Wade Trophy, Honda Sports Award, First-team All-American, MVC Player of the Year
