= 2000–01 Iowa Hawkeyes women's basketball team =

Intercollegiate basketball season

2000–01 Iowa Hawkeyes women's basketball

Big Ten Tournament champions

NCAA tournament, Second round
- Conference: Big Ten Conference

Ranking
- Coaches: No. 21
- AP: No. 16
- Record: 21–10 (12–4 Big Ten)
- Head coach: Lisa Bluder (1st season)
- Assistant coach: Jan Jensen
- Home arena: Carver–Hawkeye Arena

2000–01 Big Ten women's basketball standings
	Conf.				Overall
Team	W		L	PCT	W		L	PCT
No. 9 Purdue	14	–	2	.875	31	–	7	.816
No. 16 Iowa †	12	–	4	.750	21	–	10	.677
No. 24 Wisconsin	12	–	4	.750	18	–	10	.643
No. 21 Penn State	11	–	5	.688	19	–	10	.655
Michigan	10	–	6	.625	19	–	12	.613
Indiana	9	–	7	.563	20	–	11	.645
Illinois	9	–	7	.563	17	–	16	.515
Ohio State	6	–	10	.375	22	–	11	.667
Michigan State	4	–	12	.250	10	–	18	.357
Minnesota	1	–	15	.063	8	–	20	.286
Northwestern	0	–	16	.000	4	–	23	.148
† 2001 Big Ten Tournament winner Rankings from AP Poll

The 2000–01 Iowa Hawkeyes women's basketball team represented the University of Iowa as members of the Big Ten Conference during the 2000–01 NCAA women's basketball season. The Hawkeyes, led by first-year head coach Lisa Bluder, played their home games in Iowa City, Iowa at Carver–Hawkeye Arena. They finished the season 21–10 overall, 12–4 in Big Ten play, to occupy second place in the conference regular season standings. The team won the Big Ten tournament and advanced to the second round of the women's NCAA basketball tournament.

== Roster ==
2000–01 Iowa Hawkeyes women's basketball team
Players
Coaches

Pos.	#	Name	Height	Year	Previous school	Hometown
G	2	Kristi Faulkner	5 ft 7 in (1.7 m)	Fr		Glen Ellyn, Illinois
F	5	Jerica Watson	6 ft 0 in (1.83 m)	Jr	Washington	Milwaukee, Wisconsin
G	10	Lindsey Meder	5 ft 8 in (1.73 m)	Jr	Solon	Solon, IA
G	12	Leah Magner	6 ft 0 in (1.83 m)	Jr
G	21	Cara Consuegra	5 ft 8 in (1.73 m)	Sr	Linganore	Frederick, MD
G	22	Mary Berdo	5 ft 10 in (1.78 m)	Sr	Washington	Washington, IA
C	44	Beatrice Bullock	6 ft 1 in (1.85 m)	Jr
C	45	Randi Peterson	6 ft 3 in (1.91 m)	Sr
F	50	Jennie Lillis	6 ft 1 in (1.85 m)	Fr	Dowling Catholic	Urbandale, IA

Head coach

- Lisa Bluder

Assistant coach(es)

- Jan Jensen

Legend

- (C) Team captain
- (S) Suspended
- (I) Ineligible
- (W) Walk-on
- Injured
- Current redshirt

Roster

== Schedule and results ==
Date time, TV	Rank^{#}	Opponent^{#}	Result	Record	Site city, state
Regular season
Nov 17, 2000*		Marquette	W 70–57	1–0	Carver-Hawkeye Arena; Iowa City, Iowa
Nov 19, 2000*		Utah	L 42–66	1–1	Carver-Hawkeye Arena; Iowa City, Iowa
Nov 22, 2000*		No. 8 Iowa State; Rivalry	L 76–86	1–2	Carver-Hawkeye Arena; Iowa City, Iowa
Nov 25, 2000*		Western Illinois; Gazette Hawkeye Challenge	W 99–54	2–2	Carver-Hawkeye Arena; Iowa City, Iowa
Nov 26, 2000*		Nevada; Gazette Hawkeye Challenge	W 73–59	3–2	Carver-Hawkeye Arena; Iowa City, Iowa
Dec 1, 2000*		at Mount St. Mary's	W 89–63	4–2	Knott Arena; Emmitsburg, Maryland
Dec 3, 2000*		at George Washington	L 64–78	4–3	Charles E. Smith Center; Washington, D.C.
Dec 7, 2000*		at No. 18 Southwest Missouri State	L 87–101	4–4	Hammons Student Center; Springfield, Missouri
Dec 10, 2000*		Colorado	W 92–66	5–4	Carver-Hawkeye Arena; Iowa City, Iowa
Dec 16, 2000*		at Drake	L 58–73	5–5	Knapp Center; Des Moines, Iowa
Dec 28, 2000		Northwestern	W 95–61	6–5 (1–0)	Carver-Hawkeye Arena; Iowa City, Iowa
Dec 31, 2000		at Wisconsin	L 91–94	6–6 (1–1)	Kohl Center; Madison, Wisconsin
Jan 4, 2001		at No. 8 Purdue	L 58–73	6–7 (1–2)	Mackey Arena; West Lafayette, Indiana
Jan 7, 2001		Michigan	W 79–58	7–7 (2–2)	Carver-Hawkeye Arena; Iowa City, Iowa
Jan 14, 2001		Wisconsin	W 74–68	8–7 (3–2)	Carver-Hawkeye Arena; Iowa City, Iowa
Jan 17, 2001		at Ohio State	L 52–79	8–8 (3–3)	Value City Arena; Columbus, Ohio
Jan 21, 2001		No. 13 Penn State	W 79–64	9–8 (4–3)	Carver-Hawkeye Arena; Iowa City, Iowa
Jan 25, 2001		at Northwestern	W 92–52	10–8 (5–3)	Welsh-Ryan Arena; Evanston, Illinois
Feb 1, 2001		at Michigan State	W 71–56	11–8 (6–3)	Breslin Student Events Center; East Lansing, Michigan
Feb 4, 2001		Indiana	W 83–56	12–8 (7–3)	Carver-Hawkeye Arena; Iowa City, Iowa
Feb 8, 2001		No. 5 Purdue	W 96–87	13–8 (8–3)	Carver-Hawkeye Arena; Iowa City, Iowa
Feb 11, 2001		at Minnesota	W 82–71	14–8 (9–3)	Williams Arena; Minneapolis, Minnesota
Feb 15, 2001	No. 25	at Michigan	L 78–80	14–9 (9–4)	Crisler Arena; Ann Arbor, Michigan
Feb 18, 2001	No. 25	Ohio State	W 74–59	15–9 (10–4)	Carver-Hawkeye Arena; Iowa City, Iowa
Feb 22, 2001	No. 25	Michigan State	W 50–47	16–9 (11–4)	Carver-Hawkeye Arena; Iowa City, Iowa
Feb 25, 2001	No. 25	at Illinois	W 75–64	17–9 (12–4)	Assembly Hall; Champaign, Illinois
Big Ten tournament
Mar 2, 2001*	(2) No. 23	vs. (7) Indiana; Quarterfinals	W 81–76	18–9	Van Andel Arena; Grand Rapids, Michigan
Mar 3, 2001*	(2) No. 23	vs. (3) Illinois; Semifinals	W 86–79	19–9	Van Andel Arena; Grand Rapids, Michigan
Mar 4, 2001*	(2) No. 23	vs. (1) No. 7 Purdue; Championship game	W 75–70	20–9	Van Andel Arena; Grand Rapids, Michigan
NCAA tournament
Mar 17, 2001*	(4 MW) No. 16	vs. (13 MW) Oregon; First round	W 89–82 ^{OT}	21–9	Jon M. Huntsman Center; Salt Lake City, Utah
Mar 19, 2001*	(4 MW) No. 16	at (5 MW) No. 17 Utah; Second round	L 69–78	21–10	Jon M. Huntsman Center; Salt Lake City, Utah
*Non-conference game. ^{#}Rankings from AP Poll. (#) Tournament seedings in parentheses. MW=Midwest.

== Rankings ==
Ranking movements Legend: ██ Increase in ranking ██ Decrease in ranking — = Not ranked RV = Received votes
	Week																			
Poll	Pre	1	2	3	4	5	6	7	8	9	10	11	12	13	14	15	16	17	18	Final
AP	—	—	—	—	—	—	—	—	—	—	—	—	—	RV	25	25	23	17	16	Not released
Coaches	—	—*	—	—	—	—	—	—	—	—	—	—	—	—	—	—	—	RV	22	21

* Coaches did not release a week 1 poll.
