= 2000–01 Purdue Boilermakers women's basketball team =

Intercollegiate basketball season

2000–01 Purdue Boilermakers women's basketball

Big Ten regular season champions

NCAA tournament, Runner-up
- Conference: Big Ten Conference

Ranking
- Coaches: No. 2
- AP: No. 9
- Record: 31–7 (14–2 Big Ten)
- Head coach: Kristy Curry (2nd season)
- Home arena: Mackey Arena

2000–01 Big Ten women's basketball standings
| | Conf. | | | | Overall |
| Team | W | | L | PCT | W | | L | PCT |
|---|---|---|---|---|---|---|---|---|
| No. 9 Purdue | 14 | – | 2 | .875 | 31 | – | 7 | .816 |
| No. 16 Iowa † | 12 | – | 4 | .750 | 21 | – | 10 | .677 |
| No. 24 Wisconsin | 12 | – | 4 | .750 | 18 | – | 10 | .643 |
| No. 21 Penn State | 11 | – | 5 | .688 | 19 | – | 10 | .655 |
| Michigan | 10 | – | 6 | .625 | 19 | – | 12 | .613 |
| Indiana | 9 | – | 7 | .563 | 20 | – | 11 | .645 |
| Illinois | 9 | – | 7 | .563 | 17 | – | 16 | .515 |
| Ohio State | 6 | – | 10 | .375 | 22 | – | 11 | .667 |
| Michigan State | 4 | – | 12 | .250 | 10 | – | 18 | .357 |
| Minnesota | 1 | – | 15 | .063 | 8 | – | 20 | .286 |
| Northwestern | 0 | – | 16 | .000 | 4 | – | 23 | .148 |
† 2001 Big Ten Tournament winner Rankings from AP Poll

The 2000–01 Purdue Boilermakers women's basketball team represented Purdue University as a member of the Big Ten Conference during the 2000–01 NCAA Division I women's basketball season. Led by second-year head coach Kristy Curry, the Boilermakers played their home games at Mackey Arena in West Lafayette, Indiana. Purdue finished the regular season with a 14–2 record in Big Ten play to capture the regular season title. They were upset by Iowa in the Big Ten tournament, but received a bid to the NCAA tournament as No. 3 seed in the Mideast region. The Boilermakers beat UC Santa Barbara, LSU, Texas Tech, and Xavier to reach their second Final Four in three seasons. They defeated SW Missouri State in the National semifinals. In the National championship game, Purdue lost to Notre Dame by just two points, 68–66.

== Roster ==
2000–01 Purdue Boilermakers women's basketball team
Players
Coaches

| Pos. | # | Name | Height | Year | Previous school | Hometown |
|---|---|---|---|---|---|---|
| C | 42 | Camille Cooper (C) | 6 ft 4 in (1.93 m) | Sr | Scott County | Georgetown, Kentucky |
| F | 31 | Candi Crawford | 6 ft 1 in (1.85 m) | Sr | Homestead | Fort Wayne, Indiana |
| G/F | 32 | Katie Douglas (C) | 6 ft 1 in (1.85 m) | Sr | Perry Meridian | Indianapolis, Indiana |
| G | 45 | Cherrise Graham | 5 ft 7 in (1.7 m) | Fr | Archbishop Carroll | Conshohocken, Pennsylvania |
| F | 4 | Lindsey Hicks | 6 ft 1 in (1.85 m) | Fr | Lebanon H.S. | Lebanon, Ohio |
| F | 44 | Shalicia Hurns | 6 ft 3 in (1.91 m) | Fr | Broad Ripple | Indianapolis, Indiana |
| G | 30 | Beth Jones | 5 ft 9 in (1.75 m) | Fr | Mason | Maineville, Ohio |
| G | 3 | Kelly Komara | 5 ft 7 in (1.7 m) | Jr | Lake Central | Schererville, Indiana |
| G/F | 41 | Mo-Nique Langston | 5 ft 11 in (1.8 m) | Sr | Bakersfield North | Bakersfield, California |
| F | 2 | Laura Meadows (redshirt) | 6 ft 3 in (1.91 m) | Sr | Huntington East (H.S.); Kentucky | Huntington, West Virginia |
| C | 58 | Mary Jo Noon | 6 ft 5 in (1.96 m) | RS So | Jeffersonville | Clarksville, Indiana |
| G | 11 | Shinika Parks | 5 ft 8 in (1.73 m) | Sr | Fairfield (H.S.); Trinity Valley C.C. | Suisun, California |
| G | 33 | Erika Valek | 5 ft 6 in (1.68 m) | Fr | Coronado | Lubbock, Texas |
| F | 50 | Shereka Wright | 5 ft 10 in (1.78 m) | Fr | Copperas Cove H.S. | Copperas Cove, Texas |

Head coach

- Kristy Curry (Louisiana–Monroe)

Assistant coach(es)

- Pam Stackhouse (Louisiana Tech)
- Kerry Cremeans (Florida)
- Kelly Curry (Texas A&M)

Legend

- (C) Team captain
- (S) Suspended
- (I) Ineligible
- (W) Walk-on
- Injured
- Current redshirt

== Schedule and results ==
| Date time, TV | Rank^{#} | Opponent^{#} | Result | Record | High points | High rebounds | High assists | Site city, state |
Non-Conference Regular Season
| November 11, 2000* | No. 4 | Eastern Michigan; Pre-Season WNIT – First Round | W 84–60 | 1–0 | 21 – Cooper | 6 – Hurns | 7 – Douglas | Mackey Arena (7,833); West Lafayette, Indiana |
| November 13, 2000* | No. 4 | Georgetown; Pre-Season WNIT – Second Round | W 81–67 | 2–0 | 22 – Douglas | 5 – Cooper | 4 – Valek | Mackey Arena (7,211); West Lafayette, Indiana |
| November 19, 2000* | No. 4 | Texas; Pre-Season WNIT – Semifinals | W 71–49 | 3–0 | 19 – Cooper | 10 – Cooper | 4 – Douglas | Mackey Arena (2,163); West Lafayette, Indiana |
| November 20, 2000* | No. 4 | No. 11 Louisiana Tech; Pre-Season WNIT – Championship Game | L 63–68 | 3–1 | 22 – Douglas | 13 – Cooper | 2 – Tied | Mackey Arena (2,175); West Lafayette, Indiana |
| November 25, 2000* | No. 4 | vs. Montana State; Torneo Cancun de Basquetbol – Semifinals | W 86–61 | 4–1 | 18 – Douglas | 9 – Hurns | 5 – Komara | Kuchil-Baxal Gymnasium (256); Cancun, Mexico |
| November 26, 2000* | No. 6 | vs. South Carolina; Torneo Cancun de Basquetbol – Championship Game | W 68–53 | 5–1 | 18 – Douglas | 9 – Graham | 3 – Douglas | Kuchil-Baxal Gymnasium (217); Cancun, Mexico |
| December 1, 2000* | No. 6 | at Kentucky | W 87–67 | 6–1 | 13 – Tied | 6 – Tied | 4 – Tied | Memorial Coliseum (2,010); Lexington, Kentucky |
| December 3, 2000 | No. 6 | at Boston College | W 73–61 | 7–1 | 18 – Douglas | 9 – Hurns | 5 – Douglas | FleetCenter (3,754); Boston, Massachusetts |
| December 6, 2000* | No. 6 | at Valparaiso | W 89–59 | 8–1 | 14 – Valek | 8 – Wright | 5 – Wright | Athletics–Recreation Center (2,134); Valparaiso, Indiana |
| December 9, 2000* | No. 6 | at No. 4 Notre Dame | L 61–72 | 8–2 | 20 – Douglas | 8 – Cooper | 3 – Wright | Joyce Center (7,330); South Bend, Indiana |
| December 16, 2000* | No. 6 | vs. No. 20 LSU; Boilermaker Blockbuster | L 55–62 | 8–3 | 13 – Valek | 10 – Cooper | 6 – Douglas | Conseco Fieldhouse; Indianapolis, Indiana |
| December 19, 2000* | No. 8 | No. 14 Stanford | W 90–60 | 9–3 | 20 – Douglas | 11 – Hurns | 10 – Douglas | Mackey Arena (8,507); West Lafayette, Indiana |
| December 21, 2000* | No. 8 | DePaul | W 80–67 | 10–3 | 29 – Cooper | 7 – Hurns | 7 – Douglas | Mackey Arena (7,268); West Lafayette, Indiana |
Big Ten Regular Season
| December 28, 2000 | No. 8 | at Wisconsin | W 70–58 | 11–3 (1–0) | 12 – Komara | 8 – Hurns | 6 – Douglas | Kohl Center (7,205); Madison, Wisconsin |
| December 30, 2000; 2:00 pm, CBS | No. 8 | at Michigan | W 65–54 | 12–3 (2–0) | 13 – Tied | 8 – Hurns | 5 – Douglas | Crisler Arena (2,042); Ann Arbor, Michigan |
| January 4, 2001 | No. 6 | Iowa | W 73–58 | 13–3 (3–0) | 15 – Cooper | 9 – Wright | 5 – Komara | Mackey Arena (7,474); West Lafayette, Indiana |
| January 7, 2001 | No. 6 | at Indiana; Rivalry Game | W 67–59 | 14–3 (4–0) | 13 – Douglas | 10 – Cooper | 2 – Tied | Simon Skjodt Assembly Hall (3,414); Bloomington, Indiana |
| January 14, 2001 | No. 6 | Northwestern | W 94–37 | 15–3 (5–0) | 19 – Wright | 9 – Cooper | 5 – Wright | Mackey Arena (8,651); West Lafayette, Indiana |
| January 18, 2001 | No. 6 | Michigan State | W 57–34 | 16–3 (6–0) | 15 – Douglas | 8 – Hurns | 3 – Tied | Mackey Arena (7,495); West Lafayette, Indiana |
| January 21, 2001 | No. 6 | at Illinois | W 72–64 | 17–3 (7–0) | 17 – Komara | 10 – Cooper | 7 – Douglas | Assembly Hall (6.606); Champaign, Illinois |
| January 25, 2001 | No. 6 | at Minnesota | W 86–61 | 18–3 (8–0) | 17 – Cooper | 7 – Douglas | 8 – Wright | Williams Arena (913); Minneapolis, Minnesota |
| January 28, 2001 | No. 6 | Wisconsin | W 75–70 ^{OT} | 19–3 (9–0) | 24 – Douglas | 9 – Douglas | 3 – Tied | Mackey Arena (9,082); West Lafayette, Indiana |
| February 1, 2001 | No. 6 | Illinois | W 83–67 | 20–3 (10–0) | 19 – Cooper | 7 – Wright | 5 – Tied | Mackey Arena (7,717); West Lafayette, Indiana |
| February 4, 2001; 1:00 pm, FSN Chicago | No. 6 | Michigan | W 73–64 | 21–3 (11–0) | 25 – Wright | 9 – Cooper | 4 – Valek | Mackey Arena (8,216); West Lafayette, Indiana |
| February 8, 2001 | No. 5 | at Iowa | L 87–96 | 21–4 (11–1) | 19 – Cooper | 5 – Hurns | 5 – Valek | Carver–Hawkeye Arena (3,292); Iowa City, Iowa |
| February 11, 2001 | No. 5 | at Ohio State | W 74–71 ^{OT} | 22–4 (12–1) | 19 – Hurns | 14 – Hurns | 3 – Valek | Value City Arena (11,467); Columbus, Ohio |
| February 15, 2001; 8:00 pm, FSN Chicago | No. 7 | Indiana; Rivalry Game / Senior Night | W 87–46 | 23–4 (13–1) | 25 – Cooper | 7 – Hurns | 6 – Valek | Mackey Arena (10,207); West Lafayette, Indiana |
| February 18, 2001 | No. 7 | Minnesota | W 96–43 | 24–4 (14–1) | 21 – Douglas | 8 – Hurns | 8 – Valek | Mackey Arena (12,264); West Lafayette, Indiana |
| February 22, 2001 | No. 5 | at No. 19 Penn State | L 65–75 | 24–5 (14–2) | 25 – Douglas | 9 – Cooper | 3 – Tied | Bryce Jordan Center (6,490); University Park, Pennsylvania |
Big Ten Tournament
| March 2, 2001*; 2:20 pm, FSN | (1) No. 7 | vs. (8) Ohio State; Quarterfinals | W 81–61 | 25–5 | 21 – Douglas | 8 – Cooper | 5 – Douglas | Van Andel Arena (4,853); Grand Rapids, Michigan |
| March 3, 2001*; 4:00 pm, FSN | (1) No. 7 | vs. (4) Michigan; Semifinals | W 74–55 | 26–5 | 18 – Douglas | 14 – Cooper | 4 – Valek | Van Andel Arena (7,781); Grand Rapids, Michigan |
| March 4, 2001*; 8:00 pm, ESPN2 | (1) No. 7 | vs. (2) No. 23 Iowa; Championship Game | L 70–75 | 26–6 | 23 – Douglas | 13 – Hurns | 4 – Douglas | Van Andel Arena (5,369); Grand Rapids, Michigan |
NCAA Tournament
| March 16, 2001*; 8:30 pm, ESPN2 | (3 ME) No. 9 | (14 ME) UC Santa Barbara; First Round | W 75–62 | 27–6 | 23 – Cooper | 9 – Douglas | 3 – Tied | Mackey Arena (5,262); West Lafayette, Indiana |
| March 18, 2001*; 9:00 pm, ESPN2 | (3 ME) No. 9 | (6 ME) No. 18 LSU; Second Round | W 73–70 | 28–6 | 21 – Douglas | 6 – Cooper | 7 – Douglas | Mackey Arena (5,043); West Lafayette, Indiana |
| March 24, 2001*; 2:30 pm, ESPN2 | (3 ME) No. 9 | vs. (2 ME) No. 13 Texas Tech; Sweet Sixteen | W 74–72 | 29–6 | 18 – Douglas | 7 – Tied | 3 – Valek | BJCC Arena (6,576); Birmingham, Alabama |
| March 26, 2001*; 8:00 pm, ESPN2 | (3 ME) No. 9 | vs. (4 ME) No. 12 Xavier; Elite Eight | W 88–78 | 30–6 | 20 – Komara | 12 – Hurns | 8 – Douglas | BJCC Arena (4,092); Birmingham, Alabama |
| March 30, 2001*; 7:00 pm, ESPN | (3 ME) No. 9 | vs. (5 W) No. 15 Southwest Missouri State; Final Four | W 81–64 | 31–6 | 25 – Douglas | 12 – Hurns | 3 – Tied | Savvis Center (20,551); St. Louis, Missouri |
| April 1, 2001*; 8:30 pm, ESPN | (3 ME) No. 9 | vs. (1 MW) No. 2 Notre Dame; National Championship Game | L 66–68 | 31–7 | 18 – Douglas | 7 – Tied | 5 – Douglas | Savvis Center (20,551); St. Louis, Missouri |
*Non-conference game. ^{#}Rankings from AP Poll. (#) Tournament seedings in parentheses. All times are in Eastern Time. ME = Mid-East, W = West, MW = Mid-West.
