= Geno Auriemma Award =

- Awarded for: The best women's basketball college coach
- Country: United States
- Presented by: United States Basketball Writers Association
- First award: 1990
- Currently held by: Shea Ralph, Vanderbilt
- Website: https://www.sportswriters.net/usbwa

The Geno Auriemma Award, known through the 2023–24 college basketball season as the United States Basketball Writers Association National Coach of the Year Award, is an annual award presented by the United States Basketball Writers Association to the top NCAA Division I women's basketball head coach since the 1989–90 season.

After the 2023–24 season, the award was named after Hall of Fame coach Geno Auriemma, who at the time of announcement had won it six times at UConn.

== Winners ==
Year	Winner	School
1990	Tara VanDerveer	Stanford
1991	Debbie Ryan	Virginia
1992	Chris Weller	Maryland
1993	Jim Foster	Vanderbilt
1994	Ceal Barry	Colorado
1995	Geno Auriemma	UConn (Note: Officially known for sports purposes as "Connecticut" before 2013–14.)
1996	Leon Barmore	Louisiana Tech
1997	Wendy Larry	Old Dominion
1998	Pat Summitt	Tennessee
1999	Carolyn Peck	Purdue
2000	Andy Landers	Georgia
2001	Muffet McGraw	Notre Dame
2002	Brenda Frese	Minnesota
2003	Geno Auriemma (2)	UConn
2004	Joe Curl	Houston
2005	Pokey Chatman	LSU
2006	Sylvia Hatchell	North Carolina
2007	Gail Goestenkors	Duke
2008	Geno Auriemma (3)	UConn
2009	Geno Auriemma (4)	UConn
2010	Connie Yori	Nebraska
2011	Kim Mulkey	Baylor
2012	Kim Mulkey (2)	Baylor
2013	Muffet McGraw (2)	Notre Dame
2014	Muffet McGraw (3)	Notre Dame
2015	Courtney Banghart	Princeton
2016	Geno Auriemma (5)	UConn
2017	Geno Auriemma (6)	UConn
2018	Vic Schaefer	Mississippi State
2019	Kim Mulkey (3)	Baylor
2020	Dawn Staley	South Carolina
2021	Tara VanDerveer (2)	Stanford
2022	Dawn Staley (2)	South Carolina
2023	Dawn Staley (3)	South Carolina
2024	Dawn Staley (4)	South Carolina
2025	Cori Close	UCLA
2026	Shea Ralph	Vanderbilt

== See also ==
- United States Basketball Writers Association
