= 2000–01 Notre Dame Fighting Irish women's basketball team =

Intercollegiate basketball season

2000–01 Notre Dame Fighting Irish women's basketball

NCAA tournament National Champions Big East regular season co-champions
- Conference: Big East Conference

Ranking
- Coaches: No. 1
- AP: No. 2
- Record: 34–2 (15–1 Big East)
- Head coach: Muffet McGraw (14th season)
- Assistant coaches: Kevin McGuff (5th season); Coquese Washington (2nd season); Carol Owens (1st season)
- Home arena: Edmund P. Joyce Center

2000–01 Big East Conference women's basketball standings
	Conf.				Overall
Team	W		L	PCT	W		L	PCT
No. 2 Notre Dame	15	–	1	.938	34	–	2	.944
No. 1 Connecticut †	15	–	1	.938	32	–	3	.914
No. 11 Rutgers	13	–	3	.813	23	–	8	.742
Villanova	11	–	5	.688	22	–	9	.710
Virginia Tech	11	–	5	.688	22	–	9	.710
Seton Hall	9	–	7	.563	16	–	12	.571
Boston College	7	–	9	.438	14	–	15	.483
Georgetown	6	–	10	.375	17	–	15	.531
Miami (FL)	6	–	10	.375	13	–	15	.464
Syracuse	6	–	10	.375	12	–	15	.444
Providence	4	–	12	.250	11	–	17	.393
Pittsburgh	3	–	13	.188	9	–	18	.333
St. John's	3	–	13	.188	8	–	20	.286
West Virginia	3	–	13	.188	5	–	22	.185
† 2001 Big East Tournament winner As of April 2, 2001; Rankings from AP poll

The 2000–01 Notre Dame Fighting Irish women's basketball team represented the University of Notre Dame during the 2000–01 NCAA Division I women's basketball season. The Fighting Irish, led by fourteenth-year head coach Muffet McGraw, played their home games at Edmund P. Joyce Center as members of the Big East Conference. The Irish finished the season 34–2, 15–1 in Big East play to earn a share of the regular season championship. They defeated Virginia and Florida State before losing to UConn in the Big East Women's Tournament championship. Notre Dame received an at-large bid as the No. 1 seed in the Midwest (Denver) region. They defeated Alcorn State and Michigan to advance to the Sweet Sixteen. There they defeated Utah and Vanderbilt to advance to the Final Four. The Fighting Irish exacted some revenge over the No. 1 UConn Huskies in the Final Four, then defeated the No. 3 seed from the Mideast region, 9th ranked Purdue, in the national championship. The Irish edged the Boilermakers 68–66 to capture the program's first national title.

The Fighting Irish opened the season ranked No. 6 in the AP poll. After 18 wins without a defeat, including a comfortable win over No. 1 UConn, Notre Dame rose to the No. 1 ranking. The team went on to win their first 23 games before losing 54–53 at Rutgers.

Senior center Ruth Riley was named Big East Player of the Year and Naismith Player of the Year, and earned her second straight First-team All-American honor.

== Roster ==
2000–01 Notre Dame Fighting Irish women's basketball team
Players
Coaches

Pos.	#	Name	Height	Year	Previous school	Hometown
C	00	Ruth Riley	6 ft 5 in (1.96 m)	RS Sr	North Miami	Macy, IN
G	22	Alicia Ratay	6 ft 0 in (1.83 m)	RS So	Lake Zurich
G	33	Niele Ivey	5 ft 8 in (1.73 m)	RS Sr	Cor Jesu Academy	St. Louis, MO

Head coach

- Muffet McGraw (Saint Joseph's)

Assistant coach(es)

- Kevin McGuff
- Coquese Washington
- Carol Owens (Northern Illinois)

Legend

- (C) Team captain
- (S) Suspended
- (I) Ineligible
- (W) Walk-on
- Injured
- Current redshirt

Roster

== Schedule and results ==
Date time, TV	Rank^{#}	Opponent^{#}	Result	Record	Site (attendance) city, state
Exhibition
November 5, 2000*	No. 6	Ohio All-Stars	W 91–56	–	Joyce Center; Notre Dame, Indiana
November 14, 2000*	No. 6	Tapiolan Honka	W 98–53	–	Joyce Center; Notre Dame, Indiana
Regular season
November 17, 2000*	No. 6	at Valparaiso	W 71–46	1–0	Athletics–Recreation Center (2,018); Valparaiso, Indiana
November 20, 2000*	No. 5	Arizona	W 95–65	2–0	Joyce Center (3,082); Notre Dame, Indiana
November 22, 2000*	No. 5	at No. 19 Wisconsin	W 83–56	3–0	Kohl Center (6,943); Madison, Wisconsin
November 24, 2000*; ESPN	No. 5	vs. No. 6 Georgia	W 75–73	4–0	Kohl Center (6,851); Madison, Wisconsin
November 27, 2000*	No. 4	Fordham	W 89–44	5–0	Joyce Center (3,107); Notre Dame, Indiana
December 3, 2000*; ESPN2	No. 4	vs. North Carolina	W 78–55	6–0	(1,972); Orlando, Florida
December 6, 2000	No. 4	Villanova	W 64–33	7–0 (1–0)	Joyce Center (3,168); Notre Dame, Indiana
December 9, 2000*	No. 4	No. 6 Purdue	W 72–61	8–0	Joyce Center (7,330); Notre Dame, Indiana
December 18, 2000*	No. 3	Western Michigan	W 84–54	9–0	Joyce Center (3,108); Notre Dame, Indiana
December 21, 2000*	No. 3	at Marquette	W 75–56	10–0	U.S. Cellular Arena (2,412); Milwaukee, Wisconsin
December 28, 2000*	No. 3	at USC	W 70–61	11–0	L.A. Sports Arena (2,178); Los Angeles, California
December 31, 2000*	No. 3	Rice	W 80–40	12–0	Joyce Center (4,060); Notre Dame, Indiana
January 3, 2001	No. 3	at Virginia Tech	W 75–64	13–0 (2–0)	Cassell Coliseum (3,418); Blacksburg, Virginia
January 6, 2001	No. 3	No. 9 Rutgers	W 67–46	14–0 (3–0)	Joyce Center (5,227); Notre Dame, Indiana
January 9, 2001	No. 3	St. John's	W 75–55	15–0 (4–0)	Carnesecca Arena (385); New York, New York
January 13, 2001	No. 3	Virginia Tech	W 75–55	16–0 (5–0)	Joyce Center (5,873); Notre Dame, Indiana
January 15, 2001	No. 3	No. 1 Connecticut	W 92–76	17–0 (6–0)	Joyce Center (11,418); Notre Dame, Indiana
January 21, 2001	No. 3	at Seton Hall	W 72–47	18–0 (7–0)	Walsh Gymnasium (1,273); South Orange, New Jersey
January 24, 2001	No. 1	at West Virginia	W 87–64	19–0 (8–0)	WVU Coliseum (364); Morgantown, West Virginia
January 31, 2001	No. 1	Providence	W 64–44	20–0 (9–0)	Joyce Center (6,131); Notre Dame, Indiana
February 3, 2001	No. 1	at Boston College	W 81–65	21–0 (10–0)	Conte Forum (5,429); Chestnut Hill, Massachusetts
February 7, 2001	No. 1	Pittsburgh	W 72–58	22–0 (11–0)	Joyce Center (7,025); Notre Dame, Indiana
February 14, 2001	No. 1	at Syracuse	W 75–61	23–0 (12–0)	Manley Field House (1,627); Syracuse, New York
February 17, 2001	No. 1	at No. 11 Rutgers	L 53–54	23–1 (12–1)	Louis Brown Athletic Center (8,587); Piscataway, New Jersey
February 20, 2001	No. 2	Miami (FL)	W 81–43	24–1 (13–1)	Joyce Center (6,533); Notre Dame, Indiana
February 24, 2001	No. 2	Georgetown	W 65–53	25–1 (14–1)	Joyce Center (11,418); Notre Dame, Indiana
February 27, 2001	No. 1	at Pittsburgh	W 82–63	26–1 (15–1)	Fitzgerald Field House (2,050); Pittsburgh, Pennsylvania
Big East tournament
March 4, 2001*	No. 1	vs. Georgetown; Quarterfinals	W 89–33	27–1	Gampel Pavilion (10,027); Storrs, Connecticut
March 5, 2001*	No. 1	vs. Virginia Tech; Semifinals	W 67–49	28–1	Gampel Pavilion (10,027); Storrs, Connecticut
March 6, 2001*	No. 1	at No. 2 Connecticut; Championship game	L 76–78	28–2	Gampel Pavilion (10,027); Storrs, Connecticut
NCAA women's tournament
March 17, 2001*	(1 MW) No. 2	(16 MW) Alcorn State; First round	W 98–49	29–2	Joyce Center (8,553); Notre Dame, Indiana
March 19, 2001*	(1 MW) No. 2	(8 MW) Michigan; Second round	W 88–54	30–2	Joyce Center (9,597); Notre Dame, Indiana
March 24, 2001*	(1 MW) No. 2	(5 MW) No. 17 Utah; Regional Semifinal – Sweet Sixteen	W 69–54	31–2	Pepsi Center (10,559); Denver, Colorado
March 26, 2001*	(1 MW) No. 2	(3 MW) No. 10 Vanderbilt; Regional Final – Elite Eight	W 72–64	32–2	Pepsi Center (8,422); Denver, Colorado
March 30, 2001*; ESPN	(1 MW) No. 2	vs. (1 E) No. 1 Connecticut; National Semifinal – Final Four	W 90–75	33–2	Savvis Center (20,551); St. Louis, Missouri
April 1, 2001*; ESPN	(1 MW) No. 2	vs. (1 ME) No. 9 Purdue; National Championship	W 68–66	34–2	Savvis Center (20,551); St. Louis, Missouri
*Non-conference game. ^{#}Rankings from AP Poll. (#) Tournament seedings in parentheses. S=Spokane Region. All times are in Eastern.

== Rankings ==
Ranking movements Legend: ██ Increase in ranking ██ Decrease in ranking
	Week																			
Poll	Pre	1	2	3	4	5	6	7	8	9	10	11	12	13	14	15	16	17	18	Final
AP	6	6	5	4	4	3	3	3	3	3	3	1	1	1	1	2	2	1	2	Not released
Coaches	5	5	5	4	4	3	3	3	3	3	3	1	1	1	1	2	2	1	1	1
