= 2000–01 NCAA Division I women's basketball rankings =

- Season: 2000–01
- NCAA Tournament: 2001
- Preseason No. 1: Connecticut
- NCAA Tournament Champions: Notre Dame
NCAA Division I women's basketball rankings


Two human polls comprise the 2000–01 NCAA Division I women's basketball rankings, the AP Poll and the Coaches Poll, in addition to various publications' preseason polls. The AP poll is currently a poll of sportswriters, while the USA Today Coaches' Poll is a poll of college coaches. The AP conducts polls weekly through the end of the regular season and conference play, while the Coaches poll conducts a final, post-NCAA tournament poll as well.

== Legend ==
–	No votes
(#)	Ranking

== AP Poll ==
Team	PS	13-Nov	20-Nov	27-Nov	4-Dec	11-Dec	18-Dec	25-Dec	1-Jan	8-Jan	15-Jan	22-Jan	29-Jan	5-Feb	12-Feb	19-Feb	26-Feb	5-Mar	12-Mar
UConn	1	1	1	1	1	1	1	1	1	1	1	2	2	3	3	3	3	2	1
Notre Dame	6	6	5	4	4	3	3	3	3	3	3	1	1	1	1	2	2	1	2
Tennessee	2	2	2	2	2	2	2	2	2	2	2	3	3	2	2	1	1	3	3
Georgia	3	5	6	7	5	4	4	4	4	4	4	5	5	7	5	4	6	4	4
Duke	5	3	3	3	3	7	6	6	5	5	5	4	4	4	4	7	4	5	5
Louisiana Tech	9	8	11	9	12	10	10	9	8	8	8	8	7	8	8	6	5	6	6
Oklahoma	14	14	12	19	15	17	20	22	19	17	13	12	10	10	10	8	7	7	7
Iowa St.	10	10	8	8	7	5	5	5	7	7	7	7	8	9	6	10	10	13	8
Purdue	4	4	4	6	6	6	8	8	6	6	6	6	6	5	7	5	8	9	9
Vanderbilt	20	20	25	23	23	24	22	24	23	18	15	16	19	18	20	18	15	10	10
Rutgers	8	7	7	5	9	8	7	7	9	12	11	14	14	12	11	9	9	8	11
Xavier	–	–	23	21	19	19	21	21	22	–	23	18	15	13	12	12	12	12	12
Texas Tech	16	15	13	10	8	11	11	10	13	11	9	9	12	11	14	15	14	11	13
Florida	–	–	–	–	20	18	16	19	14	10	10	10	9	6	9	11	11	15	14
Missouri St.	21	21	17	13	18	21	18	16	15	15	14	13	13	15	15	20	18	16	15
Iowa	–	–	–	–	–	–	–	–	–	–	–	–	–	–	25	25	23	17	16
Utah	–	–	–	–	–	–	25	23	25	–	24	21	18	17	16	13	13	14	17
LSU	7	9	10	15	17	20	12	13	11	9	12	11	11	14	13	14	16	18	18
NC State	19	19	22	22	21	13	17	12	16	19	22	22	–	24	21	17	21	18	19
Colorado	–	–	–	–	–	–	–	–	–	–	–	25	23	19	19	16	17	20	20
Penn State	13	11	9	11	13	12	12	11	10	13	16	19	16	16	17	19	19	21	21
Clemson	–	–	–	–	–	–	–	20	18	16	20	15	17	25	–	–	25	23	22
Baylor	–	–	–	–	–	–	–	–	–	23	25	–	20	–	–	24	24	24	23
Wisconsin	18	16	19	18	22	23	24	–	–	–	–	–	25	20	22	21	20	25	24
Arizona State	–	–	–	–	–	–	–	–	–	–	–	–	–	23	24	23	22	–	25
Stanford	11	12	18	17	16	15	14	17	21	24	–	–	–	–	–	–	–	–	–
Old Dominion	12	18	–	–	–	–	–	–	–	–	–	–	–	–	–	–	–	–	–
Virginia	15	13	16	20	24	25	–	–	–	–	–	–	–	–	–	–	–	–	–
Mississippi State	17	17	15	16	14	22	19	18	17	21	21	–	–	–	–	–	–	–	–
North Carolina	22	22	–	–	–	–	–	–	–	–	–	–	–	–	–	–	–	–	–
Oregon	23	24	14	12	10	14	23	25	24	20	18	20	22	–	–	–	–	–	–
Auburn	24	23	20	14	11	9	9	14	20	25	–	–	–	–	–	–	–	–	–
UCSB	25	–	–	–	–	–	–	–	–	–	–	–	–	–	–	–	–	–	–

== USA Today Coaches poll ==
Team	PS	21-Nov	28-Nov	5-Dec	12-Dec	19-Dec	26-Dec	2-Jan	9-Jan	16-Jan	23-Jan	30-Jan	6-Feb	13-Feb	20-Feb	27-Feb	6-Mar	3-Apr
Notre Dame	5	5	4	4	3	3	3	3	3	3	1	1	1	1	2	2	1	1
Purdue	6	4	5	5	6	8	8	6	6	6	6	6	5	7	5	7	8	2
UConn	1	1	1	1	1	1	1	1	1	1	2	2	3	3	3	3	2	3
Missouri St.	21	16	13	17	18	15	15	14	14	14	12	13	14	13	16	16	16	4
Tennessee	2	2	2	2	2	2	2	2	2	2	3	3	2	2	1	1	3	5
Louisiana Tech	8	9	8	10	10	10	9	8	8	8	9	8	8	8	7	6	6	6
Vanderbilt	19	25	23	24	25	25	22	21	17	16	17	18	18	19	17	15	13	7
Duke	4	3	3	3	5	5	5	5	5	5	4	4	4	4	6	4	5	8
Xavier	–	24	20	18	17	20	20	20	22	22	19	16	15	15	12	12	11	9
Oklahoma	17	13	18	16	15	17	17	16	16	15	13	12	11	10	8	8	7	10
Texas Tech	13	12	10	8	11	11	11	12	9	9	8	9	10	11	13	13	12	11
Iowa St.	11	11	11	9	7	6	6	7	7	7	7	7	7	6	9	9	10	12
Georgia	3	6	7	6	4	4	4	4	4	4	5	5	6	5	4	5	4	13
Washington	–	–	–	–	–	–	–	–	–	–	–	–	–	–	–	–	–	14
Utah	–	–	–	–	–	–	–	–	–	25	21	19	17	17	15	14	15	15
North Carolina St.	18	23	21	19	14	13	12	13	18	19	22	24	21	20	19	20	18	16
Rutgers	7	7	6	7	8	7	7	10	13	10	14	14	13	14	11	11	9	17
Florida	–	–	–	22	20	16	19	15	11	12	11	11	9	9	10	10	14	18
Missouri	–	–	–	–	–	–	–	–	–	–	–	–	–	–	–	–	–	19
LSU	9	10	14	14	16	14	13	11	10	11	10	10	12	12	14	17	17	20
Iowa	–	–	–	–	–	–	–	–	–	–	–	–	–	–	–	–	22	21
Clemson	–	–	–	–	–	–	23	23	19	20	16	17	22	22	22	19	19	22
Colorado	–	–	–	–	–	–	–	–	–	–	–	–	T24	21	20	21	21	23
Villanova	–	–	–	–	–	–	–	–	–	–	–	–	–	25	24	23	24	24
Florida St.	–	–	–	–	–	–	–	–	–	–	–	–	–	–	–	–	–	25
Arizona	–	–	–	–	–	–	–	–	24	23	25	23	19	23	23	25	–	–
Auburn	20	18	15	13	12	12	14	19	23	–	–	–	–	–	–	–	–	–
Baylor	–	–	–	–	–	–	–	–	–	–	22	–	–	–	–	–	–	–
Boston College	22	19	19	21	24	24	–	–	–	–	–	–	–	–	–	–	–	–
Illinois	24	21	24	–	–	–	–	–	–	–	–	–	–	–	–	–	–	–
Mississippi St.	16	14	16	15	19	18	16	18	21	21	23	–	–	–	–	–	–	–
North Carolina	25	–	–	–	–	–	–	–	–	–	–	–	–	–	–	–	–	–
Old Dominion	12	20	25	–	–	–	–	–	–	–	–	–	–	–	–	–	–	–
Oregon	–	17	12	12	13	21	25	24	20	18	20	21	23	–	–	–	–	–
Penn St.	10	8	9	11	9	9	10	9	12	13	15	15	16	16	18	18	20	–
Stanford	14	22	22	23	22	19	21	22	25	–	–	–	–	–	–	–	–	–
Texas	–	–	–	–	23	22	18	17	15	17	18	20	20	18	21	22	23	–
Virginia	15	15	17	20	21	23	24	25	–	24	24	25	T24	24	–	–	–	–
Wisconsin	23	–	–	25	–	–	–	–	–	–	–	–	–	–	25	24	25	–
