= 2000–01 Connecticut Huskies women's basketball team =

Intercollegiate basketball season

2000–01 Connecticut Huskies women's basketball

Big East tournament champions Big East regular season co-champions

NCAA tournament, Final Four
- Conference: Big East Conference

Ranking
- Coaches: No. 3
- AP: No. 1
- Record: 32–3 (15–1 Big East)
- Head coach: Geno Auriemma (16th season)
- Associate head coach: Chris Dailey
- Assistant coaches: Tonya Cardoza; Jamelle Elliott
- Home arena: Harry A. Gampel Pavilion

2000–01 Big East Conference women's basketball standings
	Conf.				Overall
Team	W		L	PCT	W		L	PCT
No. 2 Notre Dame	15	–	1	.938	34	–	2	.944
No. 1 Connecticut †	15	–	1	.938	32	–	3	.914
No. 11 Rutgers	13	–	3	.813	23	–	8	.742
Villanova	11	–	5	.688	22	–	9	.710
Virginia Tech	11	–	5	.688	22	–	9	.710
Seton Hall	9	–	7	.563	16	–	12	.571
Boston College	7	–	9	.438	14	–	15	.483
Georgetown	6	–	10	.375	17	–	15	.531
Miami (FL)	6	–	10	.375	13	–	15	.464
Syracuse	6	–	10	.375	12	–	15	.444
Providence	4	–	12	.250	11	–	17	.393
Pittsburgh	3	–	13	.188	9	–	18	.333
St. John's	3	–	13	.188	8	–	20	.286
West Virginia	3	–	13	.188	5	–	22	.185
† 2001 Big East Tournament winner As of April 2, 2001; Rankings from AP poll

The 2000–01 Connecticut Huskies women's basketball team represented the University of Connecticut during the 2000–01 NCAA Division I basketball season. Coached by Geno Auriemma, the Huskies played their home games at the Hartford Civic Center in Hartford, Connecticut, and on campus at the Harry A. Gampel Pavilion in Storrs, Connecticut, and are a member of the Big East Conference.

The Huskies opened the season with a No. 1 ranking in both major polls, a position they held for over half the season before a road loss at No. 3 Notre Dame. UConn would regain the top spot after winning the Big East tournament. The team received an automatic bid to the NCAA tournament as the No. 1 seed in the East region. The Huskies overwhelmed Long Island and Colorado State to reach the Sweet Sixteen. UConn won the East regional, played in Pittsburgh, with double-digit wins over No. 4 seed NC State and No. 3 seed Louisiana Tech. In the Final Four, the Huskies were beaten by No. 2-ranked and fellow Big East foe, Notre Dame, 90–75. The loss lit a fire within the program as the team would go on to become three-peat National champions from 2002 to 2004.

== Roster ==
2000–01 Connecticut Huskies women's basketball team
Players
Coaches

Pos.	#	Name	Height	Year	Previous school	Hometown
G/F	3	Diana Taurasi	6 ft 0 in (1.83 m)	Fr	Don Lugo	Chino, California
G	5	Maria Conlon	5 ft 9 in (1.75 m)	Fr	Seymour	Derby, Connecticut
G	10	Sue Bird	5 ft 9 in (1.75 m)	Jr	Christ the King	Syosset, New York
C	11	Kelly Schumacher	6 ft 5 in (1.96 m)	Sr
F/C	15	Asjha Jones	6 ft 2 in (1.88 m)	Jr	Piscataway	Piscataway, New Jersey
G	20	Morgan Valley	6 ft 0 in (1.83 m)	Fr	Rice Memorial	Colchester, Vermont
F	25	Svetlana Abrosimova (C)	6 ft 2 in (1.88 m)	Sr
F	32	Swin Cash	6 ft 2 in (1.88 m)	Jr	McKeesport	McKeesport, Pennsylvania
G	33	Shea Ralph (C)	6 ft 0 in (1.83 m)	Sr	Terry Sanford
F	34	Tamika Williams	6 ft 2 in (1.88 m)	Jr	Chaminade-Julienne	Dayton, Ohio

Head coach

Geno Auriemma

Assistant coach(es)

Chris Dailey
Tonya Cardoza
Jamelle Elliott

Legend

- (C) Team captain
- (S) Suspended
- (I) Ineligible
- (W) Walk-on
- Injured
- Current redshirt

Roster

== Schedule ==
Date time, TV	Rank^{#}	Opponent^{#}	Result	Record	Site (attendance) city, state
Regular season
Nov 12, 2000*	No. 1	No. 3 Georgia	W 99–70	1–0	Harry A. Gampel Pavilion; Storrs, Connecticut
Nov 21, 2000*	No. 1	at Pepperdine	W 98–63	2–0	Firestone Fieldhouse; Malibu, California
Dec 30, 2000*; CBS	No. 1	No. 2 Tennessee	W 81–76	9–0	Harry A. Gampel Pavilion; Storrs, Connecticut
Jan 2, 2001	No. 1	Georgetown	W 107–45	10–0 (1–0)	Harry A. Gampel Pavilion; Storrs, Connecticut
Jan 13, 2001	No. 1	Providence	W 104–49	13–0 (3–0)	Harry A. Gampel Pavilion; Storrs, Connecticut
Jan 15, 2001	No. 1	at No. 3 Notre Dame	L 76–92	13–1 (3–1)	Joyce Center (11,418); Notre Dame, Indiana
Jan 18, 2001*	No. 1	Old Dominion	W 80–51	14–1	Harry A. Gampel Pavilion; Storrs, Connecticut
Jan 20, 2001	No. 1	at Pittsburgh	W 83–43	15–1 (4–1)	Fitzgerald Field House; Pittsburgh, Pennsylvania
Feb 1, 2001*	No. 2	at No. 3 Tennessee	L 88–92	17–2	Nashville, Tennessee
Feb 27, 2001	No. 3	at Seton Hall	W 83–48	25–2 (15–1)	Walsh Gymnasium; South Orange, New Jersey
Big East tournament
Mar 4, 2001*	No. 2	Boston College; Quarterfinals	W 96–53	26–2	Harry A. Gampel Pavilion (10,027); Storrs, Connecticut
Mar 5, 2001*	No. 2	No. 8 Rutgers; Semifinals	W 94–66	27–2	Harry A. Gampel Pavilion (10,027); Storrs, Connecticut
Mar 6, 2001*	No. 2	No. 1 Notre Dame; Championship game	W 78–76	28–2	Harry A. Gampel Pavilion (10,027); Storrs, Connecticut
NCAA tournament
Mar 17, 2001*	(1 E) No. 1	(16 E) Long Island; First round	W 101–29	29–2	Harry A. Gampel Pavilion (10,027); Storrs, Connecticut
Mar 19, 2001*	(1 E) No. 1	(9 E) Colorado State; Second round	W 89–44	30–2	Harry A. Gampel Pavilion (10,027); Storrs, Connecticut
Mar 24, 2001*	(1 E) No. 1	vs. (4 E) No. 19 NC State; Regional Semifinal – Sweet Sixteen	W 72–58	31–2	Mellon Arena; Pittsburgh, Pennsylvania
Mar 26, 2001*	(1 E) No. 1	vs. (3 E) No. 6 Louisiana Tech; Regional Final – Elite Eight	W 67–48	32–2	Mellon Arena; Pittsburgh, Pennsylvania
Mar 30, 2001*; ESPN	(1 E) No. 1	vs. (1 MW) No. 2 Notre Dame; National Semifinal – Final Four	L 75–90	32–3	Savvis Center (20,551); St. Louis, Missouri
*Non-conference game. ^{#}Rankings from AP Poll. (#) Tournament seedings in parentheses. E=East. All times are in Eastern Time.

== Rankings ==
Ranking movements Legend: ██ Increase in ranking ██ Decrease in ranking
	Week																			
Poll	Pre	1	2	3	4	5	6	7	8	9	10	11	12	13	14	15	16	17	18	Final
AP	1	1	1	1	1	1	1	1	1	1	1	2	2	3	3	3	3	2	1	Not released
Coaches	1	1	1	1	1	1	1	1	1	1	1	2	2	3	3	3	3	2	2	3
