= Muffet McGraw =

American basketball coach (born 1955)

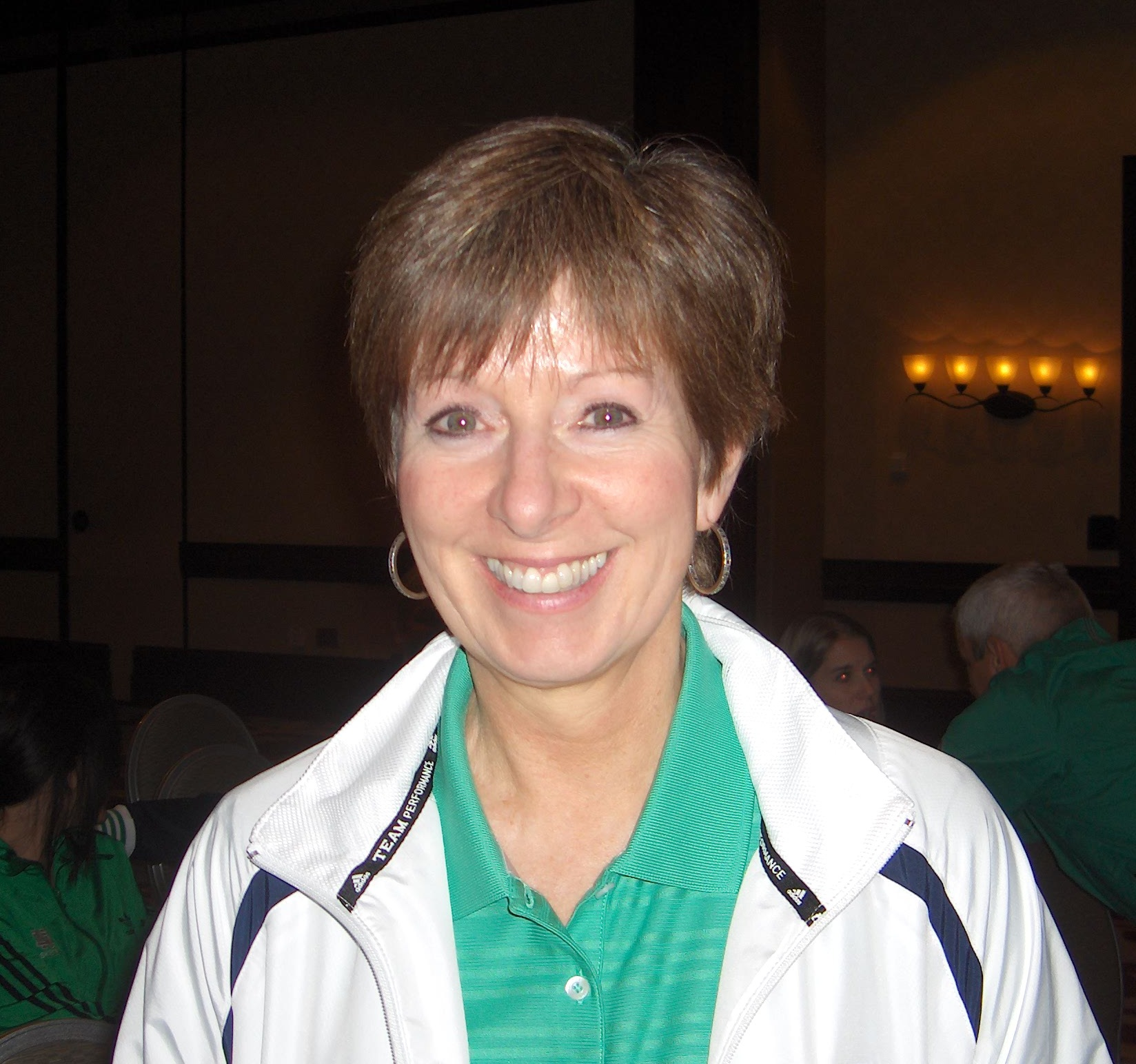
- McGraw at the 2011 WBCA convention in Indianapolis

Biographical details
- Born: December 5, 1955 (age 70); Pottsville, Pennsylvania, U.S.

Playing career
- 1974–1977: Saint Joseph's
- 1979–1980: California Dreams
- Position: Guard

Coaching career (HC unless noted)
- 1977–1979: Archbishop Carroll HS
- 1980–1982: Saint Joseph's (assistant)
- 1982–1987: Lehigh
- 1987–2020: Notre Dame

Head coaching record
- Overall: 936–293 (.762)

Accomplishments and honors

Championships
- 2 NCAA Division I tournament (2001, 2018); 9 NCAA Regional – Final Four (1997, 2001, 2011–2015, 2018, 2019); 5 ACC tournament (2014–2017, 2019); 6 ACC regular season (2014–2019); 3 Big East regular season (2001, 2012, 2013); Big East tournament (2013); 5 MCC tournament (1989–1992, 1994); 5 MCC regular season (1989–1991, 1994, 1995); ECC tournament (1986); ECC regular season (1986)

Awards
- 4× AP Coach of the Year (2001, 2013, 2014, 2018); 3× Naismith Coach of the Year (2001, 2013, 2014); 3× USBWA Coach of the Year (2001, 2013, 2014); 3× WBCA Coach of the Year (2001, 2013, 2014); John R. Wooden Legends of Coaching Award (2017); Indiana Sports Hall of Fame (2020)
- Basketball Hall of Fame; Inducted in 2017 (profile)
- Women's Basketball Hall of Fame

Muffet McGraw (née Ann O'Brien; born December 5, 1955) is an American former college basketball coach and analyst, who served as the head women's basketball coach at Notre Dame from 1987 to 2020, compiling a 848–252 (.771) record over 33 seasons.

== Career ==
McGraw led her team to nine Final Fours (1997, 2001, 2011, 2012, 2013, 2014, 2015, 2018 and 2019), seven championship game appearances (2001, 2011, 2012, 2014, 2015, 2018, and 2019), and two National Championships in 2001 and 2018. McGraw was the sixth different Division I coach to win multiple NCAA titles, joining Dawn Staley, Geno Auriemma, Pat Summitt, Linda Sharp, Tara VanDerveer and Kim Mulkey.

McGraw was born in Pottsville, Pennsylvania. She graduated from Bishop Shanahan High School in 1973 and Saint Joseph's University in 1977. She briefly played professionally for the California Dreams of the Women's Professional Basketball League. She coached at Archbishop John Carroll High School from 1977 to 1979, and worked as an assistant coach at Saint Joseph's from 1980 to 1982. From 1982 to 1987 she was head coach at Lehigh University where one of her notable players was Cathy Engelbert. McGraw was also Lehigh's softball coach from 1982 until 1985.

McGraw became head coach at Notre Dame in 1987. Between 1987 and 2020, she led the Irish to 26 NCAA tournament appearances including a streak of 24 straight seasons from 1995 to 2019. During this streak, Notre Dame reached the second round in all but one appearance, including 7 championship game appearances. McGraw compiled 50 wins over ranked opponents, including 40 over the last 8 seasons. Her teams appeared in the AP poll 139 times during her tenure. Notre Dame finished in the top 3 of the Big East in 9 out of the 11 seasons they were in the league and finished in first place in the Atlantic Coast Conference in all 4 seasons since they entered the conference.

McGraw received the US Basketball Writers Association (USBWA) Coach of the Year award, the Women's Basketball Coaches Association Coach of the Year award, and the Naismith College Coach of the Year award in 2001. She was inducted into the Women's Basketball Hall of Fame in 2011 and the Naismith Memorial Basketball Hall of Fame in 2017. In 2016, the John R. Wooden Award committee recognized her with the 2017 Legends of Coaching Award.

McGraw is the 27th coach in NCAA history to win over 500 career games, and is currently tied as the eighth head coach in NCAA Division I basketball history to reach 800 career wins. On April 1, 2018, she achieved her 800th career victory at Notre Dame with a win over the Mississippi State Bulldogs in the national championship game, her second national title with the Fighting Irish. On December 30, 2018, she notched her 900th career win against Lehigh, the team at which she began her collegiate coaching career in 1982.

On April 22, 2020, McGraw announced that she was stepping down as the head coach of Notre Dame. She was succeeded by Niele Ivey, who had spent 17 seasons at Notre Dame as a player and an assistant coach.

Since leaving Notre Dame, she has been a studio analyst for the ACC Network, contributing to studio shows and halftime reports. She also is a professor of sports leadership at the Mendoza College of Business at Notre Dame and has been involved in local Democratic politics.

== Personal life ==
McGraw got her nickname from the nursery rhyme Little Miss Muffet. She legally changed her name to "Muffet" prior to entering college. She met her future husband Matt McGraw at St. Joseph's, and married him in October 1977 and together they have a son, Murphy.

== Awards and honors ==
In December 2023, the University of Notre Dame unveiled a Muffet McGraw statue in front of Purcell Pavilion, the school's basketball arena. A plaque in front of the statue notes her career accomplishments, including the two national championships at Notre Dame.

McGraw's career coaching awards include:

- 2001 – AP College Basketball Coach of the Year
- 2001 – Russell Athletic/WBCA National Coach of the Year
- 2009 – Carol Eckman Award
- 2011 – Women's Basketball Hall of Fame
- 2013 – Naismith Women's College Coach of the Year
- 2013 – AP College Basketball Coach of the Year
- 2013 – Women's Basketball Coaches Association (WBCA) Division I Coach of the Year
- 2014 – espnW Coach of the Year
- 2014 – AP College Basketball Coach of the Year
- 2014 – USBWA Coach of the Year
- 2014 – Russell Athletic/WBCA National Coach of the Year
- 2016 – Legends of Coaching Award (2017)
- 2017 – Naismith Memorial Basketball Hall of Fame
- 2018 – AP College Basketball Coach of the Year
- 2023 – NCAA President's Pat Summitt Award
- 2023 - Notre Dame University Statue Dedication
- 2025 - Naismith Outstanding Contributor Award

== Head coaching record ==
Record table
Season	Team	Overall	Conference	Standing	Postseason
Lehigh Engineers (East Coast Conference) (1982–1987)
1982–83	Lehigh	14–9			
1983–84	Lehigh	13–9			
1984–85	Lehigh	20–8			
1985–86	Lehigh	24–4			
1986–87	Lehigh	17–11			
Lehigh:		88–41 (.682)			
Notre Dame Fighting Irish (North Star Conference) (1987–1988)
1987–88	Notre Dame	20–8	7–3	2nd	
Notre Dame Fighting Irish (Midwestern Collegiate Conference) (1988–1995)
1988–89	Notre Dame	21–11	12–2	T–1st	WNIT seventh place
1989–90	Notre Dame	23–6	16–0	1st	
1990–91	Notre Dame	23–9	15–1	1st	WNIT eighth place
1991–92	Notre Dame	14–17	8–4	2nd	NCAA first round
1992–93	Notre Dame	15–12	11–5	T–2nd	
1993–94	Notre Dame	22–7	10–2	1st	NCAA first round
1994–95	Notre Dame	21–10	15–1	1st	WNIT third place
Notre Dame Fighting Irish (Big East Conference) (1995–2013)
1995–96	Notre Dame	23–8	15–3	2nd	NCAA second round
1996–97	Notre Dame	31–7	17–1	2nd	NCAA Final Four
1997–98	Notre Dame	22–10	12–6	T–4th	NCAA Sweet Sixteen
1998–99	Notre Dame	26–5	15–3	3rd	NCAA second round
1999–00	Notre Dame	27–5	15–1	2nd	NCAA Sweet Sixteen
2000–01	Notre Dame	34–2	15–1	T–1st	NCAA champions
2001–02	Notre Dame	20–10	13–3	2nd	NCAA second round
2002–03	Notre Dame	21–11	10–6	T–5th	NCAA Sweet Sixteen
2003–04	Notre Dame	21–11	12–4	T–2nd	NCAA Sweet Sixteen
2004–05	Notre Dame	27–6	13–3	T–2nd	NCAA second round
2005–06	Notre Dame	18–12	8–8	10th	NCAA first round
2006–07	Notre Dame	20–12	10–6	T–5th	NCAA second round
2007–08	Notre Dame	25–9	11–5	4th	NCAA Sweet Sixteen
2008–09	Notre Dame	22–9	10–6	T–4th	NCAA first round
2009–10	Notre Dame	29–6	12–4	T–4th	NCAA Sweet Sixteen
2010–11	Notre Dame	31–8	13–3	T–2nd	NCAA runner-up
2011–12	Notre Dame	35–4	15–1	1st	NCAA runner-up
2012–13	Notre Dame	35–2	16–0	1st	NCAA Final Four
Notre Dame Fighting Irish (Atlantic Coast Conference) (2013–2020)
2013–14	Notre Dame	37–1	16–0	1st	NCAA runner-up
2014–15	Notre Dame	36–3	15–1	1st	NCAA runner-up
2015–16	Notre Dame	33–2	16–0	1st	NCAA Sweet Sixteen
2016–17	Notre Dame	33–4	15–1	1st	NCAA Elite Eight
2017–18	Notre Dame	35–3	15–1	T–1st	NCAA champions
2018–19	Notre Dame	35–4	14–2	T–1st	NCAA runner-up
2019–20	Notre Dame	13–18	8–10	T–9th	
Notre Dame:		848–252 (.771)	425–97 (.814)		
Total:		936–292 (.762)			
National champion Postseason invitational champion Conference regular season champion Conference regular season and conference tournament champion Division regular season champion Division regular season and conference tournament champion Conference tournament champion

== See also ==
- List of college women's basketball career coaching wins leaders
