= 2001 NCAA Division I women's basketball tournament =

American college basketball tournament

- Teams: 64
- Finals site: Savvis Center, St. Louis, Missouri
- Champions: Notre Dame Fighting Irish (1st title, 1st title game, 2nd Final Four)
- Runner-up: Purdue Boilermakers (2nd title game, 3rd Final Four)
- Semifinalists: Connecticut Huskies (5th Final Four); Southwest Missouri State Lady Bears (2nd Final Four)
- Winning coach: Muffet McGraw (1st title)
- MOP: Ruth Riley (Notre Dame)

The 2001 NCAA Division I women's basketball tournament began on March 16 and ended on April 1. The tournament featured 64 teams. The Final Four, held at the Savvis Center in St. Louis, Missouri, consisted of Connecticut, Notre Dame, Purdue, and Southwest Missouri State (now known as Missouri State), with Notre Dame defeating Purdue 68–66 to win its first NCAA title. Notre Dame's Ruth Riley was named the Most Outstanding Player of the tournament.

== Notable events ==
With the Final Four held in the state of Missouri for the first time in NCAA history, 10th seeded University of Missouri rose to the occasion and upset 7th seeded Wisconsin in the first round. They then went on to play the 2nd seeded team from Georgia and won that game as well, advancing to the regional, where their bid to play in their home state ended in a loss to Louisiana Tech. Southwest Missouri State also did well. They were seeded 5th, so expected to win their first-round game, but they went on to upset 4th seed Rutgers to set up a game against the Regional's top seed, Duke. The Lady Bears then upset Duke 81–71 to head to the regional final against Washington, who had upset both Florida and Oklahoma. The upsets came to an end as Southwest Missouri State beat 6th seeded Washington 104–87 to advance to the Final Four, and a chance to play in front of home state fans.

In the Mideast Regional, the top four seeds all advanced to the regional semifinal, then both higher seeds were upset. 4th seed Xavier knocked off the number one seed in the regional, Tennessee, by a score of 80–65. Third seeded Purdue played second seeded Texas Tech in a game that came down to the wire. Purdue won 74–72, then went on to defeat Xavier for the spot in the Final Four against Southwest Missouri State. The upset run by Southwest Missouri State came to an end in the semifinal, as Purdue beat them 81–64. The career of Jackie Stiles, who had scored 1,064 points in 2000–01 to become the first player in NCAA Division I women's basketball history to score 1,000 points in a single season, thus came to an end.

In the Midwest and East regionals, both number one seeds advanced to the Final Four. Both Notre Dame and Connecticut were from the Big East and met in the other semifinal. The two teams had met twice before in the season, with Notre Dame winning at their home and UConn beating Notre Dame in the Big East Championship. Early in the game, the prior year National Champion Connecticut looked to be on their way to another championship game. The Huskies led at one point by 16 points in the first half. In the second half, Notre Dame came back, and with just over twelve minutes left, took their first lead of the game. Connecticut went into a scoring drought, going more than five minutes without a point. Notre Dame went on to win 90–75, to head to their first national championship game.

The championship game featured two teams from Indiana. Notre Dame began the game with a repeat of their performance against Connecticut, falling behind by double digits in the first half. The Irish were the best three-point shooting team in the country, but ended up hitting just one of ten attempts. Purdue's Katie Douglas scored 18 points for Purdue, with her final points being a three-pointer to put the Boilermakers in front 66–64 with a little over one minute left in the game. Notre Dame's Ruth Riley scored to tie the game, then rebounded a miss by Purdue. She then took a shot, missed, but was fouled with 5.8 seconds left in the game. Riley sank both free throws to give the Irish a two-point lead and their first national championship.

== Tournament records ==
- Three-point field goal percentage – Alicia Ratay, Notre Dame, hit four of five three-point field goal attempts(80%) in the semi-final game against Connecticut, tying a record for three-point field goal percentage in a Final Four game, held by four other players.
- Margin overcome – Notre Dame overcame a 16-point deficit against Connecticut to win the game, setting a record for the largest margin overcome in a Final Four game.
- Three-point field goal percentage – Notre Dame hit eight of eleven three-point field goal attempts, setting the record for best three-point field goal percentage in a Final Four game.
- Blocks – Notre Dame recorded eleven blocks in the championship game against Purdue, tying the record for blocks in a Final Four game.
- Assists – Tasha Pointer, Rutgers, recorded 18 assist in the West region first-round game against Stephen F. Austin, setting the record for most assists in an NCAA tournament game.
- Field goal percentage – Connecticut held Long Island to 10 field goals on 65 attempts(15.4%) in an East region first-round game, setting the record for the best field goal defense in an NCAA tournament game.

== Qualifying teams – automatic ==
Sixty-four teams were selected to participate in the 2001 NCAA Tournament. Thirty-one conferences were eligible for an automatic bid to the 2001 NCAA tournament.

Automatic bids
| | | Record | | |
| Qualifying school | Conference | Regular Season | Conference | Seed |
|---|---|---|---|---|
| Alcorn State | SWAC | 21–10 | 15–3 | 16 |
| Austin Peay | OVC | 17–13 | 10–6 | 16 |
| Chattanooga | SoCon | 24–6 | 15–3 | 12 |
| Colorado State | Mountain West | 24–6 | 10–4 | 9 |
| Connecticut | Big East | 28–2 | 15–1 | 1 |
| Delaware | America East | 26–4 | 17–1 | 13 |
| Duke | ACC | 28–3 | 13–3 | 1 |
| Georgia | SEC | 26–5 | 11–3 | 2 |
| Georgia State | Trans America | 24–6 | 15–3 | 14 |
| Holy Cross | Patriot League | 21–8 | 11–1 | 14 |
| Howard | MEAC | 22–9 | 15–3 | 15 |
| Idaho State | Big Sky | 25–4 | 16–0 | 14 |
| Iowa | Big Ten | 20–9 | 12–4 | 4 |
| Iowa State | Big 12 | 25–5 | 12–4 | 2 |
| Liberty | Big South | 18–11 | 12–2 | 15 |
| Long Island | Northeast | 16–14 | 11–7 | 16 |
| Louisiana Tech | Sun Belt | 28–4 | 16–0 | 3 |
| Milwaukee | Horizon League | 19–10 | 12–2 | 16 |
| Old Dominion | CAA | 21–8 | 15–1 | 11 |
| Oral Roberts | Mid-Continent | 20–10 | 11–5 | 15 |
| Penn | Ivy League | 23–5 | 14–0 | 15 |
| Siena | MAAC | 24–5 | 17–1 | 11 |
| Saint Mary's | West Coast | 25–5 | 11–3 | 9 |
| Southwest Missouri State | Missouri Valley | 25–5 | 16–2 | 5 |
| Stanford | Pac-10 | 18–10 | 12–6 | 10 |
| Stephen F. Austin | Southland | 26–6 | 18–2 | 13 |
| TCU | WAC | 24–7 | 13–3 | 11 |
| Toledo | MAC | 25–5 | 15–1 | 12 |
| Tulane | C-USA | 22–9 | 12–4 | 10 |
| UC Santa Barbara | Big West | 22–8 | 12–2 | 14 |
| Xavier | Atlantic 10 | 28–2 | 15–1 | 4 |

== Qualifying teams – at-large ==
Thirty-three additional teams were selected to complete the sixty-four invitations.

At-large bids
| | | Record | | |
| Qualifying school | Conference | Regular Season | Conference | Seed |
|---|---|---|---|---|
| Arizona State | Pacific-10 | 20–10 | 12–6 | 11 |
| Arkansas | SEC | 19–12 | 6–8 | 9 |
| Baylor | Big 12 | 21–8 | 9–7 | 8 |
| Clemson | ACC | 20–9 | 10–6 | 5 |
| Colorado | Big 12 | 21–8 | 11–5 | 6 |
| Denver | Sun Belt | 24–6 | 14–2 | 10 |
| Drake | Missouri Valley | 23–6 | 16–2 | 12 |
| Fairfield | MAAC | 25–5 | 16–2 | 12 |
| Florida | SEC | 23–5 | 11–3 | 3 |
| Florida State | ACC | 18–11 | 9–7 | 7 |
| George Washington | Atlantic 10 | 22–9 | 14–2 | 7 |
| Louisville | C-USA | 19–9 | 14–2 | 13 |
| LSU | SEC | 19–10 | 8–6 | 6 |
| Maryland | ACC | 17–11 | 8–8 | 8 |
| Michigan | Big Ten | 18–11 | 10–6 | 8 |
| Missouri | Big 12 | 20–9 | 10–6 | 10 |
| N.C. State | ACC | 20–10 | 9–7 | 4 |
| Notre Dame | Big East | 28–2 | 15–1 | 1 |
| Oklahoma | Big 12 | 26–5 | 15–1 | 2 |
| Oregon | Pacific-10 | 17–11 | 10–8 | 13 |
| Penn State | Big Ten | 19–9 | 11–5 | 6 |
| Purdue | Big Ten | 26–6 | 14–2 | 3 |
| Rutgers | Big East | 22–7 | 13–3 | 4 |
| Tennessee | SEC | 29–2 | 14–0 | 1 |
| Texas | Big 12 | 20–12 | 7–9 | 8 |
| Texas Tech | Big 12 | 23–6 | 13–3 | 2 |
| Utah | Mountain West | 26–3 | 14–0 | 5 |
| Vanderbilt | SEC | 21–9 | 8–6 | 3 |
| Villanova | Big East | 21–8 | 11–5 | 5 |
| Virginia | ACC | 18–13 | 8–8 | 9 |
| Virginia Tech | Big East | 21-8 | 11–5 | 7 |
| Washington | Pacific-10 | 19–9 | 12–6 | 6 |
| Wisconsin | Big Ten | 18–9 | 12–4 | 7 |

== Bids by conference ==
Thirty-one conferences earned an automatic bid. In nineteen cases, the automatic bid was the only representative from the conference. Thirty-three additional at-large teams were selected from twelve of the conferences.

| Bids | Conference | Teams |
| 7 | Big 12 | Iowa State, Baylor, Colorado, Missouri, Oklahoma, Texas, Texas Tech |
| 6 | Atlantic Coast | Duke, Clemson, Florida State, Maryland, NC State, Virginia |
| 6 | Southeastern | Georgia, Arkansas, Florida, LSU, Tennessee, Vanderbilt |
| 5 | Big East | Connecticut, Notre Dame, Rutgers, Villanova, Virginia Tech |
| 5 | Big Ten | Iowa, Michigan, Penn State, Purdue, Wisconsin |
| 4 | Pacific-10 | Arizona State, Oregon, Stanford, Washington |
| 2 | Atlantic 10 | Xavier, George Washington |
| 2 | Conference USA | Tulane, Louisville |
| 2 | Metro Atlantic | Siena, Fairfield |
| 2 | Missouri Valley | SW Missouri State, Drake |
| 2 | Mountain West | Colorado State, Utah |
| 2 | Sun Belt | Louisiana Tech, Denver |
| 1 | America East | Delaware. |
| 1 | Big Sky | Idaho State |
| 1 | Big South | Liberty |
| 1 | Big West | UC Santa Barbara |
| 1 | CAA | Old Dominion |
| 1 | Horizon | Milwaukee |
| 1 | Ivy | Penn |
| 1 | Mid-American | Toledo |
| 1 | Mid-Continent | Oral Roberts |
| 1 | MEAC | Howard |
| 1 | Northeast | Long Island |
| 1 | Ohio Valley | Austin Peay |
| 1 | Patriot | Holy Cross |
| 1 | Southern | Chattanooga |
| 1 | Southland | Stephen F. Austin |
| 1 | Southwestern | Alcorn State |
| 1 | Trans America | Georgia State |
| 1 | West Coast | St. Mary's Cal. |
| 1 | WAC | TCU |

== 2001 NCAA tournament schedule and venues ==
2001 NCAA NCAA first and second round venues
2001 NCAA regionals and Final Four

In 2001, the field remained at 64 teams. The teams were seeded, and assigned to four geographic regions, with seeds 1–16 in each region. In Round 1, seeds 1 and 16 faced each other, as well as seeds 2 and 15, seeds 3 and 14, seeds 4 and 13, seeds 5 and 12, seeds 6 and 11, seeds 7 and 10, and seeds 8 and 9. In the first two rounds, the top four seeds were given the opportunity to host the first-round game. In most cases, the higher seed accepted the opportunity. The exception:

- Fourth seeded Iowa was unable to host so fifth seeded Utah hosted three first and second-round games

First and Second rounds

The following lists the region, host school, venue and the sixteen first and second round locations:

- March 16 and 18
  - East Region
    - Stegeman Coliseum, Athens, Georgia (Host: University of Georgia)
    - Reynolds Coliseum, Raleigh, North Carolina (Host: North Carolina State University)
  - Mideast Region
    - Thompson–Boling Arena, Knoxville, Tennessee (Host: University of Tennessee)
    - Mackey Arena, West Lafayette, Indiana (Host: Purdue University)
    - United Spirit Arena, Lubbock, Texas (Host: Texas Tech University)
    - Cintas Center, Cincinnati, Ohio (Host: Xavier University)
  - Midwest Region
    - Hilton Coliseum, Ames, Iowa (Host: Iowa State University)
  - West Region
    - O'Connell Center, Gainesville, Florida (Host: University of Florida)
- March 17 and 19
  - East Region
    - Harry A. Gampel Pavilion, Storrs, Connecticut (Host: University of Connecticut)
    - Thomas Assembly Center, Ruston, Louisiana (Host: Louisiana Tech University)
  - Midwest Region
    - Joyce Center, Notre Dame, Indiana (Host: University of Notre Dame)
    - Memorial Gymnasium, Nashville, Tennessee (Host: Vanderbilt University)
    - Jon M. Huntsman Center, Salt Lake City, Utah (Host: University of Utah)
  - West Region
    - Lloyd Noble Center, Norman, Oklahoma (Host: University of Oklahoma)
    - Louis Brown Athletic Center, Piscataway, New Jersey (Host: Rutgers University)
    - Cameron Indoor Stadium, Durham, North Carolina (Host: Duke University)

Regional semifinals and finals

The Regionals, named for the general location, were held from March 24 to March 26 at these sites:

- March 24 and 26
  - Midwest Regional, Pepsi Center, Denver, Colorado (Host: University of Colorado)
  - Mideast Regional, Birmingham–Jefferson Convention Complex, Birmingham, Alabama (Host: Southeastern Conference)
  - East Regional, Mellon Arena, Pittsburgh, Pennsylvania (Host: Duquesne University)
  - West Regional, Spokane Veterans Memorial Arena, Spokane, Washington (Host: Washington State University)

Each regional winner advanced to the Final Four held March 30 and April 1 in St. Louis, Missouri at the Savvis Center (Host: Missouri Valley Conference)

== Bids by state ==
The sixty-four teams came from thirty-two states, plus Washington, D.C. Texas had the most teams with five bids. Eighteen states did not have any teams receiving bids.

NCAA Women's basketball Tournament invitations by state 2001

| Bids | State | Teams |
|---|---|---|
| 5 | Texas | Stephen F. Austin, TCU, Baylor, Texas, Texas Tech |
| 4 | Tennessee | Austin Peay, Chattanooga, Tennessee, Vanderbilt |
| 4 | Virginia | Liberty, Old Dominion, Virginia, Virginia Tech |
| 3 | California | Saint Mary's, Stanford, UC Santa Barbara |
| 3 | Colorado | Colorado State, Colorado, Denver |
| 3 | Iowa | Iowa, Iowa State, Drake |
| 3 | Louisiana | Louisiana Tech, Tulane, LSU |
| 3 | Pennsylvania | Penn, Penn State, Villanova |
| 2 | Connecticut | Connecticut, Fairfield |
| 2 | District of Columbia | Howard, George Washington |
| 2 | Florida | Florida, Florida State |
| 2 | Georgia | Georgia, Georgia State |
| 2 | Indiana | Notre Dame, Purdue |
| 2 | Missouri | SW Missouri State, Missouri |
| 2 | New York | Long Island, Siena |
| 2 | North Carolina | Duke, NC State |
| 2 | Ohio | Toledo, Xavier |
| 2 | Oklahoma | Oral Roberts, Oklahoma |
| 2 | Wisconsin | Milwaukee, Wisconsin |
| 1 | Arizona | Arizona State |
| 1 | Arkansas | Arkansas |
| 1 | Delaware | Delaware |
| 1 | Idaho | Idaho State |
| 1 | Kentucky | Louisville |
| 1 | Maryland | Maryland |
| 1 | Massachusetts | Holy Cross |
| 1 | Michigan | Michigan |
| 1 | Mississippi | Alcorn State |
| 1 | New Jersey | Rutgers |
| 1 | Oregon | Oregon |
| 1 | South Carolina | Clemson |
| 1 | Utah | Utah |
| 1 | Washington | Washington |

== Brackets ==
Data source

=== Mideast regional – Birmingham, AL ===
First round March 16
1 | Tennessee | 90
16 | Austin Peay | 38
Knoxville, Tennessee
8 | Texas | 64
9 | Saint Mary's | 68
5 | Clemson | 51
12 | Chattanooga | 49
Cincinnati, Ohio
4 | Xavier | 80
13 | Louisville | 52
6 | LSU | 83
11 | Arizona State | 66
West Lafayette, Indiana
3 | Purdue | 75
14 | UC Santa Barbara | 62
7 | Virginia Tech | 77
10 | Denver | 57
Lubbock, Texas
2 | Texas Tech | 100
15 | Penn | 57

Second round March 18
1 | Tennessee | 92
9 | Saint Mary's | 75
5 | Clemson | 62
4 | Xavier | 77
6 | LSU | 70
3 | Purdue | 73
7 | Virginia Tech | 52
2 | Texas Tech | 73

Regional semifinals March 24
1 | Tennessee | 65
4 | Xavier | 80
3 | Purdue | 74
2 | Texas Tech | 72

Regional finals March 26
4 | Xavier | 78
3 | Purdue | 88

=== West regional – Spokane, Washington ===
First round March 16–17
1 | Duke | 95
16 | UW–Milwaukee | 63
Durham, North Carolina – Sat/Mon
8 | Baylor | 59
9 | Arkansas | 68
5 | SW Missouri State | 89
12 | Toledo | 71
Piscataway, New Jersey – Sat/Mon
4 | Rutgers | 80
13 | Stephen F. Austin | 43
6 | Washington | 67
11 | Old Dominion | 65
Gainesville, Florida – Fri/Sun
3 | Florida | 84
14 | Holy Cross | 52
7 | George Washington | 51
10 | Stanford | 76
Norman, Oklahoma – Sat/Mon
2 | Oklahoma | 70
15 | Oral Roberts | 64

Second round March 18–19
1 | Duke | 75
9 | Arkansas | 54
5 | SW Missouri State | 60
4 | Rutgers | 53
6 | Washington | 86
3 | Florida | 75
10 | Stanford | 50
2 | Oklahoma | 67

Regional semifinals March 24
1 | Duke | 71
5 | SW Missouri State | 81
6 | Washington | 84
2 | Oklahoma | 67

Regional finals March 26
5 | SW Missouri State | 104
6 | Washington | 87

=== Midwest regional – Denver, Colorado ===
First round March 16–17
1 | Notre Dame | 98
16 | Alcorn State | 49
Notre Dame, Indiana – Sat/Mon
8 | Michigan | 81
9 | Virginia | 71
5 | Utah | 79
12 | Fairfield | 57
Salt Lake City, Utah – Sat/Mon
4 | Iowa | 89
13 | Oregon | 82
6 | Colorado | 98
11 | Siena | 78
Nashville, Tennessee – Sat/Mon
3 | Vanderbilt | 83
14 | Idaho State | 57
7 | Florida State | 72
10 | Tulane | 70
Ames, Iowa – Fri/Sun
2 | Iowa State | 100
15 | Howard | 61

Second round March 18–19
1 | Notre Dame | 88
8 | Michigan | 54
5 | Utah | 78
4 | Iowa | 69
6 | Colorado | 59
3 | Vanderbilt | 65
7 | Florida State | 70
2 | Iowa State | 85

Regional semifinals March 24
1 | Notre Dame | 69
5 | Utah | 54
3 | Vanderbilt | 84
2 | Iowa State | 65

Regional finals March 26
1 | Notre Dame | 72
3 | Vanderbilt | 64

=== East regional – Pittsburgh, Pennsylvania ===
First round March 16–17
1 | Connecticut | 101
16 | Long Island | 29
Storrs, Connecticut – Sat/Mon
8 | Maryland | 69
9 | Colorado State | 83
5 | Villanova | 66
12 | Drake | 58
Raleigh, North Carolina – Fri/Sun
4 | NC State | 76
13 | Delaware | 57
6 | Penn State | 75
11 | TCU | 77
Ruston, Louisiana – Sat/Mon
3 | Louisiana Tech | 84
14 | Georgia State | 48
7 | Wisconsin | 68
10 | Missouri | 71
Athens, Georgia – Fri/Sun
2 | Georgia | 77
15 | Liberty | 48

Second round March 18–19
1 | Connecticut | 89
9 | Colorado State | 44
5 | Villanova | 64
4 | NC State | 68
11 | TCU | 59
3 | Louisiana Tech | 80
10 | Missouri | 78
2 | Georgia | 65

Regional semifinals March 24
1 | Connecticut | 72
4 | NC State | 58
3 | Louisiana Tech | 78
10 | Missouri | 67

Regional finals March 26
1 | Connecticut | 67
3 | Louisiana Tech | 48

=== Final Four – St. Louis, Missouri ===
National semifinals March 30
ME3 | Purdue | 81
W5 | SW Missouri State | 64
MW1 | Notre Dame | 90
E1 | Connecticut | 75

National championship April 1
ME3 | Purdue | 66
MW1 | Notre Dame | 68

== Record by conference ==
Fourteen conferences had more than one bid, or at least one win in NCAA Tournament play:

| Conference | # of Bids | Record | Win % | Round of 32 | Sweet Sixteen | Elite Eight | Final Four | Championship Game |
|---|---|---|---|---|---|---|---|---|
| Big 12 | 7 | 9–7 | .563 | 5 | 4 | 0 | 0 | 0 |
| Southeastern | 6 | 9–6 | .600 | 6 | 2 | 1 | 0 | 0 |
| Atlantic Coast | 6 | 6–6 | .500 | 4 | 2 | 0 | 0 | 0 |
| Big East | 5 | 13–4 | .765 | 5 | 2 | 2 | 2 | 1 |
| Big Ten | 5 | 7–5 | .583 | 3 | 1 | 1 | 1 | 1 |
| Pacific-10 | 4 | 4–4 | .500 | 2 | 1 | 1 | 0 | 0 |
| Missouri Valley | 2 | 4–2 | .667 | 1 | 1 | 1 | 1 | 0 |
| Atlantic 10 | 2 | 3–2 | .600 | 1 | 1 | 1 | 0 | 0 |
| Mountain West | 2 | 3–2 | .600 | 2 | 1 | 0 | 0 | 0 |
| Sun Belt | 2 | 3–2 | .600 | 1 | 1 | 1 | 0 | 0 |
| Conference USA | 2 | 0–2 | .000 | 0 | 0 | 0 | 0 | 0 |
| Metro Atlantic | 2 | 0–2 | .000 | 0 | 0 | 0 | 0 | 0 |
| West Coast | 1 | 1–1 | .500 | 1 | 0 | 0 | 0 | 0 |
| Western Athletic | 1 | 1–1 | .500 | 1 | 0 | 0 | 0 | 0 |

Seventeen conferences went 0-1: America East, Big Sky Conference, Big South Conference, Big West Conference, Colonial, Horizon League, Ivy League, MAC, Mid-Continent, MEAC, Northeast Conference, Ohio Valley Conference, Patriot League, Southern Conference, Southland, SWAC, and Trans America

== All-Tournament team ==
- Ruth Riley, Notre Dame
- Niele Ivey, Notre Dame
- Katie Douglas, Purdue
- Shalicia Hurns, Purdue
- Shereka Wright, Purdue

== Game officials ==
- Dennis DeMayo (semifinal)
- Wesley Dean (semifinal)
- Nan Sisk (semifinal)
- June Courteau (semifinal)
- Greg Small (semifinal)
- Melissa Barlow (semifinal)
- Sally Bell (final)
- Scott Yarbrough (final)
- Lisa Mattingly (final)

== See also ==
- 2001 NCAA Division II women's basketball tournament
- 2001 NCAA Division III women's basketball tournament
- 2001 NAIA Division I women's basketball tournament
- 2001 NAIA Division II women's basketball tournament
- 2001 NCAA Division I men's basketball tournament
