= 1985 NCAA Division I women's basketball championship game =

Women's basketball championship game

NCAA Division I women's basketball championship game
National championship game
Georgia Lady Bulldogs	Old Dominion Monarchs
(29–4)	(30–3)
65	70
Head coach: Andy Landers	Head coach: Marianne Stanley
- AP: 8
- AP: 5
	1st half	2nd half	Total
Georgia Lady Bulldogs	31	34	65
Old Dominion Monarchs	30	40	70
- Date: March 31, 1985
- Venue: Frank Erwin Center, Austin, Texas
- MVP: Tracy Claxton, Old Dominion
- Attendance: 7,597

United States TV coverage
- Network: CBS
- Announcers: Frank Glieber (play-by-play) and Pat Summitt (analyst)

The 1985 NCAA Division I women's basketball championship game was the final game of the 1985 NCAA Division I women's basketball tournament. It determined the champion of the 1984–85 NCAA Division I women's basketball season and was contested by the Georgia Lady Bulldogs and the Old Dominion Lady Monarchs. The game was played on March 31, 1985, at the Frank Erwin Center in Austin, Texas. After trailing by a single point at halftime, No. 5 Old Dominion defeated No. 8 Georigia 70–65 to capture the NCAA national championship. ODU's Tracy Claxton was named the tournament's Most Outstanding Player.

== Participants ==
=== Georgia Lady Bulldogs ===
The Lady Bulldogs, who represented the University of Georgia in Athens, Georgia, were led by head coach Andy Landers, in his 5th season at the school. Georgia opened the season ranked No. 1 in the AP poll. Playing one of the toughest schedules in the country, the Lady Bulldogs saw their ranking slowing decline through the season and landed at No. 8 in the final poll.

In the NCAA tournament, Georgia defeated Tennessee Tech, UCLA, and No. 3 Long Beach State to reach their second NCAA Final Four in three seasons. They won 91–78 over No. 14 Western Kentucky in the national semifinal to reach the national championship game with a 29–4 record.

=== Old Dominion Lady Monarchs ===
The Lady Monarchs, represented the Old Dominion University in Norfolk, Virginia, were led by head coach Marianne Stanley in her 8th season at the school. They began the season ranked No. 3 in the AP Poll, and held the No. 1 ranking for eight weeks in December and January. ODU feel to No. 7 in February before rising to No. 5 for the final two polls of the season.

Old Dominion was the No. 2 seed in the West region of the NCAA tournament and defeated Syracuse, No. 12 NC State, and No. 7 Ohio State to reach their second NCAA Final Four in three seasons. In the National semifinal, the Lady Monarchs defeated No. 2 NE Louisiana, 57–47, to move to 30–3 and set up the championship game matchup with Georgia.

== Starting lineups ==
Georgia	Position	Old Dominion
Teresa Edwards	G	Medina Dixon
	G	
Janet Harris	F	Tracy Claxton
Katrina McClain	F	
Lisa O'Connor	F	

== Game summary ==
CBS

March 31, 1985

No. 8 Georgia Lady Bulldogs 65, No. 5 Old Dominion Lady Monarchs 70
Scoring by half: 31–30, 34–40
Pts: Rebs: Asts:	Pts: Rebs: Asts:

Frank Erwin Center – Austin, Texas
Attendance: 7,597

== Media coverage ==
The game was broadcast on CBS.
