= 1985 Sun Belt Conference women's basketball tournament =

- Classification: Division I
- Teams: 7
- Site: ODU Fieldhouse; Norfolk, Virginia
- Champions: Old Dominion (3rd title)
- Winning coach: Marianne Stanley (3rd title)

1984–85 Sun Belt Conference women's basketball standings
	Conf.				Overall
Team	W		L	PCT	W		L	PCT
No. 5 Old Dominion †	6	–	0	1.000	31	–	3	.912
No. 14 WKU	5	–	1	.833	28	–	6	.824
UAB	4	–	2	.667	14	–	15	.483
South Alabama	3	–	3	.500	19	–	10	.655
UNC Charlotte	2	–	4	.333	13	–	12	.520
VCU	1	–	5	.167	8	–	19	.296
South Florida	0	–	6	.000	8	–	18	.308
† 1985 Sun Belt tournament winner Rankings from AP Poll

The 1985 Sun Belt Conference women's basketball tournament was the postseason women's basketball tournament for the Sun Belt Conference beginning on March 7, 1985, and ending on March 9, 1985, in Norfolk, Virginia, U.S. at the Old Dominion University Fieldhouse.

Top-seeded Old Dominion defeated Western Kentucky in the championship game, 76–63, to win their third Sun Belt women's basketball tournament.

The Lady Monarchs received an automatic bid to the 1985 NCAA tournament. They were joined by conference runner-up Western Kentucky, who received an at-large bid.

Old Dominion went on to win the NCAA tournament 70–65 against the Georgia Lady Bulldogs. Western Kentucky made it to the Final Four, but lost to Georgia 78–91.

== Format ==
First-seeded Old Dominion received a bye from the first round. The winner of the third and fifth seed game would play Old Dominion the following day. The remaining conference members were placed into the initial round. Each team was seeded based on its regular season conference record.

== Seeds ==
1985 Sun Belt women's basketball tournament seeds and results
Seed	School	Conf.	Over.	Tiebreaker
1	(#5) Old Dominion^{‡}	6–0	24–3	
2	(#14) Western Kentucky	5–1	23–4	
3	Alabama-Birmingham	4–2	13–14	
4	South Alabama	3–3	18–9	
5	UNC Charlotte	2–4	13–11	
6	Virginia Commonwealth	1–5	8–18	
7	South Florida	0–6	8–17	
‡ – Sun Belt Conference regular season champions and first round bye. # – Rankings from AP Poll.

== Bracket ==
First round Friday, March 7
3	UAB	73
5	UNC Charlotte	68
4	South Alabama	69
6	VCU	66
2	#14 Western Kentucky	85
7	South Florida	64

Semifinals; Friday, March 8
1	#5 Old Dominion	95
3	UAB	57
4	South Alabama	82
2	#14 Western Kentucky	87

Championship; Sunday, March 9
1	#5 Old Dominion	76
2	#14 Western Kentucky	63

== See also ==
1985 Sun Belt Conference men's basketball tournament
