= 1985 SEC women's basketball tournament =

American college basketball postseason tournament

- Classification: Division I
- Teams: 10
- Site: Various Sites
- Champions: Tennessee (2nd title)
- Winning coach: Pat Summitt (2nd title)
- MVP: Sheila Collins (Tennessee)
- Attendance: 10,686

1984–85 SEC women's basketball standings
	Conf.				Overall
Team	W		L	PCT	W		L	PCT
Eastern Division
No. 8 Georgia	7	–	1	.875	29	–	5	.853
No. 13 Tennessee^{†}	4	–	4	.500	22	–	10	.688
Florida	4	–	4	.500	22	–	9	.710
Kentucky	3	–	5	.375	16	–	12	.571
Vanderbilt	2	–	6	.250	14	–	13	.519
Western Division
No. 6 Ole Miss	8	–	0	1.000	29	–	3	.906
No. 10 Auburn	5	–	3	.625	25	–	6	.806
LSU	4	–	4	.500	20	–	9	.690
Alabama	3	–	5	.375	18	–	10	.643
Mississippi State	0	–	8	.000	8	–	19	.296
† 1985 SEC tournament winner Rankings from AP poll

The 1985 Southeastern Conference women's basketball tournament was the postseason women's basketball tournament for the Southeastern Conference (SEC) held at the Various Campus Sites, from February 28 – March 3, 1985. The Tennessee Lady Volunteers won the tournament and earned an automatic bid to the 1985 NCAA Division I women's basketball tournament.

== Seeds ==
All teams in the conference participated in the tournament. Teams were seeded by their conference record.

Seed	School	Conference record	Overall record	Tiebreaker
1W	Ole Miss^{‡†}	8–0	29–3	
1E	Georgia^{†}	8–2	29–5	
2W	Auburn^{†}	5–3	25–6	
2E	Tennessee^{†}	4–4	22–10	
3W	LSU^{†}	4–4	20–9	
3E	Florida^{†}	4–4	22–9	
4E	Kentucky	3–5	16–12	
4W	Alabama	3–5	18–10	
5E	Vanderbilt	2–6	14–13	
5W	Mississippi State	0–8	8–19	
‡ – SEC regular season champions, and tournament No. 1 seed. † – Received a bye in the conference tournament. Overall records include all games played in the SEC Tournament.

== Schedule ==
Game	Matchup^{#}	Score
First Round – Thurs, Feb 28
1	No. 4W Alabama vs. No. 5E Vanderbilt	85–87
2	No. 4E Kentucky vs. No. 5W Mississippi State	55–58
Quarterfinal – Fri, Mar 1
3	No. 1W Ole Miss vs. No. 5E Vanderbilt	88–45
4	No. 1E Georgia vs. No. 5W Mississippi State	79–69
5	No. 2W Auburn vs. No. 3E Florida	83–64
6	No. 2E Tennessee vs. No. 3W LSU	85–78
Semifinal – Sat, Mar 2
7	No. 1W Ole Miss vs. No. 2E Tennessee	71–79
8	No. 1E Georgia vs. No. 2W Auburn	65–80
Championship – Sun, Mar 3
9	No. 2E Tennessee vs. No. 2W Auburn	63–60
# – Rankings denote tournament seed

== Bracket ==
First round Thurs, Feb 28
4W	Alabama	85
5E	Vanderbilt*	87
4E	Kentucky	55
5W	Mississippi State	58

Quarterfinals; Fri, Mar 1
1W	Ole Miss	88
5E	Vanderbilt	45
2E	Tennessee	85
3W	LSU	78
1E	Georgia	79
5W	Mississippi State	69
2W	Auburn	83
3E	Florida	64

Semifinals; Sat, Mar 2
1W	Ole Miss	71
2E	Tennessee	79
1E	Georgia	65
2W	Auburn	80

Championship; Sun, Mar 3
2E	Tennessee	63
2W	Auburn	60

Asterisk (*) indicates game ended in overtime
