= Paul Sanderford =

Retired college basketball coach

Paul "Buster" Sanderford (born November 8, 1949) is a retired college basketball coach who coached from the 1970s to 2000s. From 1976 to 1982, Sanderford accumulated 163 wins and 19 losses while coaching the women's basketball team at Louisburg Junior College. At Louisburg, Sanderford won the NJCAA Division I Women's Basketball Championship in 1981 and lost the championship in 1982. As part of the Western Kentucky Lady Toppers basketball team from 1982 to 1997, Sanderford won the Sun Belt Conference women's basketball tournament seven times and reached the final of the 1992 NCAA Division I women's basketball tournament. With 365 wins and 120 losses, Sanderford has held the record for most women's basketball wins at Western Kentucky for over twenty years.

While coaching the Nebraska Cornhuskers women's basketball team from 1997 to 2002, Sanderford reached the final of the Women's National Invitation Tournament in 1997 and the second round of the 1998 NCAA Division I women's basketball tournament. After stepping down from his coaching position in 2002, Sanderford had 88 wins and 69 losses with Nebraska. Apart from coaching, Sanderford has worked as a color analyst from the 2000s to 2010s. Sanderford was selected to the Women's Basketball Hall of Fame in 2022.

== Early life and education ==
On November 8, 1949, Sanderford was born in Zebulon, North Carolina. Growing up, Sanderford was on the basketball and baseball teams while attending Corinth Holders High School. After high school, Sanderford was a minor league baseball player for the Chicago White Sox. During the 1970s, Sanderford went to Louisburg College, Methodist College and North Carolina State University for his post secondary education. His programs included sociology and counselling. While attending college, Sanderford primarily played baseball while also playing basketball.

== Career ==
=== Early 1970s to Late 1990s ===
While at Methodist during the early 1970s, Sanderford worked as a school counselor in their admissions department. He continued his work in admissions when he became an assistant director in 1973. In 1975, Sanderford became a dean for Methodist. During this time period, Sanderford worked with their baseball team for two years before moving to their basketball team for a year in assistant coaching positions. In 1976, Sanderford joined the women's basketball team at Louisburg Junior College as their head coach.

With Louisburg, Sanderford won the NJCAA Division I Women's Basketball Championship in 1981. The following year, Sanderford and Louisburg lost the NJCAA championship final to Moberty. At Louisburg, Sanderford had 163 wins and 19 losses. In May 1982, it was announced that Sanderford would take a break from Louisburg in August 1982 and resume his tenure the following year.

Sanderford was hired as the coach of the Western Kentucky Lady Toppers basketball team in June 1982. While coaching for Western Kentucky, he helped create an invitational basketball tournament sponsored by Bowling Green Bank during the early 1980s. Sanderford won the Sun Belt Conference women's basketball tournament seven times and finished in second five times between 1983 and 1997. His team reached the NCAA Division I women's basketball tournament twelve times, which included back-to-back competitions from 1985 to 1995.

At individual NCAA competitions, Sanderford reached the Final Four with Western Kentucky during the 1985 NCAA Division I women's basketball tournament and 1986 NCAA Division I women's basketball tournament. During the 1992 NCAA Division I women's basketball tournament, Sanderford and Western Kentucky were defeated by Stanford in the championship game. At the National Women's Invitational Tournament with Western Kentucky, Sanderford's team was fourth in 1984 and sixth in 1996. After leaving the team in 1997, Sanderford had 365 wins and 120 losses with Western Kentucky. He has held the Western Kentucky record for most women's basketball wins for over twenty years leading up to the 2021–22 season.

=== Late 1990s to 2010s ===
In 1997, Sanderford became the coach of the Nebraska Cornhuskers women's basketball team. Following the announcement, members of the Nebraska Legislature disagreed with Sanderford's hiring as it went against their requirement to have more women work at the University of Nebraska–Lincoln. Chris Beutler thought the university's actions were "a direct affront to the Legislature". For Ernie Chambers, he believed that paying Sanderford more than the previous coach, Angela Beck, was a form of sexism.

With Nebraska, Sanderford was defeated in the final of the 1997 Women's National Invitation Tournament during the preseason. From 1998 to 2000, Sanderford appeared at consecutive tournaments in the NCAA with Nebraska. During these years, Sanderford and Nebraska reached the second round of the 1998 NCAA Division I women's basketball tournament. Sanderford remained with Nebraska until 2002 when he stepped down from his coaching position due to his personal health. After leaving Nebraska, Sanderford had 88 wins and 69 losses.

He resumed his experience with Western Kentucky when he became a volunteer for their men's basketball team in 2002. While at Western Kentucky, Sanderford worked in sportswear and had expanded his career to real estate. The following year, Sanderford was chosen to work for the athletic director at Western Kentucky as an assistant. For his role, Sanderford was given tasks in broadcasting advertising and financial donations.

In 2004, Sanderford became an assistant coach for the men's basketball team at Western Kentucky. Sanderford remained in his assistant position until he ended his basketball coaching career in 2007. That year, it was announced that Sanderford would work with the Hilltopper Sports Satellite Network as a color analyst for their men's basketball games. Sanderford continued his color analysis in the 2010s with ESPN and Fox College Sports. He also co-hosted a ESPN Radio program alongside Wes Strader.

== NCAA head coaching record ==
Record table
Season	Team	Overall	Conference	Standing	Postseason
Western Kentucky University (Sun Belt Conference) (1982–1997)
1982–83	Western Kentucky	22–7		2nd	
1983–84	Western Kentucky	22–11		4th	NWIT
1984–85	Western Kentucky	28–6	5-1	2nd	NCAA Final Four
1985–86	Western Kentucky	32–4	6-0	1st	NCAA Final Four
1986–87	Western Kentucky	24–9	4-2	3rd	NCAA
1987–88	Western Kentucky	26–8	4-2	3rd	NCAA
1988–89	Western Kentucky	22–9	5-1	t-1st	NCAA
1989–90	Western Kentucky	17–12	4-2	t-1st	NCAA
1990–91	Western Kentucky	29–3	5-1	2nd	NCAA Sweet Sixteen
1991–92	Western Kentucky	27–8	13-3	t-1st	NCAA Runners-up
1992–93	Western Kentucky	24–7	13-1	t-1st	NCAA Sweet Sixteen
1993–94	Western Kentucky	24–10	11-3	2nd	NCAA
1994–95	Western Kentucky	28–4	12-2	2nd	NCAA Sweet Sixteen
1995–96	Western Kentucky	19–13	11-3	2nd	NWIT
1996–97	Western Kentucky	22–9	12-2	t-1st	NCAA
Western Kentucky:		365–120 (.753)	105–23 (.820)		
University of Nebraska (Big 12 Conference) (1997–2002)
1997–98	Nebraska	23–10	11–5	3rd	NCAA
1998–99	Nebraska	21–12	8–8	5th	NCAA
1999–2000	Nebraska	18–13	10–6	5th	NCAA
2000–2001	Nebraska	12–18	4–12	10th	
2001–2002	Nebraska	14–16	4–12	11th	
Nebraska:		88–69 (.561)	37–43 (.463)		
Total:		453–189 (.706)			
National champion Postseason invitational champion Conference regular season champion Conference regular season and conference tournament champion Division regular season champion Division regular season and conference tournament champion Conference tournament champion

== Awards and honors ==
In 1981, Sanderford was named Coach of the Tournament after Louisburg won their 1981 NJCAA women's basketball title. For junior and community colleges, Sanderford was the women's basketball coach of the year recipient with Sanderford at the 1982 Wade Trophy Awards. As part of the Sun Belt Conference with Western Kentucky, Sanderford was named the conference's Coach of the Year in 1983, 1986 and 1991. For individual schools, Sanderford was inducted into a hall of fame by Methodist in 1998 and Western Kentucky in 2008. He was also inducted in 2010 into a hall of fame for Louisburg.

Sanderford was inducted into the NJCAA Women's Basketball Coaches Association Hall of Fame in 2000. In 2010, Western Kentucky retired a jersey for Sanderson at E. A. Diddle Arena. He was chosen to become part of the Kentucky Athletic Hall of Fame in 2015. After becoming a finalist for the Women's Basketball Hall of Fame in 2019, Sanderson was selected for the WBHOF in 2022.

== Personal life ==
Sanderford was nicknamed "Buster" while at Louisburg. After leaving Nebraska in 2002, Sanderford had his artery fixed with angioplasty that year. He had one child during his marriage.
