= 1991–92 Western Kentucky Lady Toppers basketball team =

Intercollegiate basketball season

1991–92 Western Kentucky Lady Toppers basketball

NCAA Mideast Regional Champion SBC Tournament Champion Sun Belt Conference Champion Bowling Green Bank Invitational Champion

NCAA Tournament, NCAA Final Four National Runner-up
- Conference: Sun Belt Conference

Ranking
- Coaches: No. 3
- AP: No. 15
- Record: 27–8 (13–3 SBC)
- Head coach: Paul Sanderford (10th season)
- Home arena: E. A. Diddle Arena

The 1991–92 WKU Lady Toppers basketball team represented Western Kentucky University during the 1991–92 NCAA Division I women's basketball season. The Lady Toppers were led by head coach Paul Sanderford and Sun Belt Conference tournament Most Outstanding Player (MOP) Kim Pehlke. They won the Sun Belt Conference season and tournament championships and received an automatic bid to the 1992 NCAA Division I women's basketball tournament, where they advanced to the National championship game. Pehlke and Paulette Monroe were named to the All-Conference team, and Pehlke and Renee Westmoreland made the SBC Tournament team. Pehlke was selected as the NCAA Mideast Region MOP with Monroe and Debbie Scott joining her on the All-Region team. Pehlke made the NCAA All-Tournament team.

== Schedule ==
Date time, TV	Rank^{#}	Opponent^{#}	Result	Record	Site city, state
Regular Season
11/23/1991*	No. 5	Eastern Kentucky; Bowling Green Bank Invitational	W 80–46	1–0	E. A. Diddle Arena; Bowling Green, KY
11/24/1991*	No. 4	Tennessee Tech; Bowling Green Bank Invitational	W 92–66	2–0	E. A. Diddle Arena; Bowling Green, KY
12/2/1991*	No. 4	at No. 8 Stephen F. Austin	L 43–58	2–1	William R. Johnson Coliseum; Nacogdoches, TX
12/11/1991*	No. 8	Kentucky	L 66–67	2–2	E. A. Diddle Arena; Bowling Green, KY
12/15/1991*	No. 13	West Virginia	W 85–84 ^{OT}	3–2	E. A. Diddle Arena; Bowling Green, KY
12/20/1991*	No. 13	Morehead State	W 86–59	4–2	E. A. Diddle Arena; Bowling Green, KY
12/27/1991*	No. 11	vs. Colorado; Seattle Times/Huskie Classic	L 68–71 ^{OT}	4–3	Hec Edmundson Pavilion; Seattle, WA
12/28/1991*	No. 11	vs. Michigan; Seattle Times/Huskie Classic	L 63–77	4–4	Hec Edmundson Pavilion; Seattle, WA
1/4/1992	No. 22	at New Orleans	W 89–72	5–4 (1-0)	Lakefront Arena; New Orleans, LA
1/7/1992*	No. 24	Vanderbilt	W 71–63	6–4	E. A. Diddle Arena; Bowling Green, KY
1/9/1992	No. 24	Texas-Pan American	W 85–46	7–4 (2-0)	E. A. Diddle Arena; Bowling Green, KY
1/12/1992	No. 21	Lamar	W 82–63	8–4 (3-0)	E. A. Diddle Arena; Bowling Green, KY
1/16/1992	No. 21	at South Alabama	W 76–54	9–4 (4-0)	Jag Gym; Mobile, AL
1/18/1992	No. 21	at Central Florida	W 90–65	10–4 (5-0)	The Venue at UCF; Orlando, FL
1/22/1992*	No. 16	DePaul	W 63–51	11–4	E. A. Diddle Arena; Bowling Green, KY
1/26/1992	No. 14	Arkansas State	W 93–76	12–4 (6-0)	E. A. Diddle Arena; Bowling Green, KY
1/30/1992	No. 14	at SW Louisiana	W 80–48	13–4 (7-0)	Cajundome; Lafayette, LA
2/2/1992*	No. 12	at Louisville	W 80–70	14–4	Freedom Hall; Louisville, KY
2/6/1992	No. 12	at Louisiana Tech	L 66–79	14–5 (7-1)	Thomas Assembly Center; Ruston, LA
2/8/1992	No. 12	at Texas-Pan American	W 96–64	15–5 (8-1)	UTPA Fieldhouse; Edinburg, TX
2/12/1992	No. 15	at Lamar	L 75–82 ^{OT}	15–6 (8-2)	Montagne Center; Beaumont, TX
2/16/1992	No. 17	South Alabama	W 97–45	16–6 (9-2)	E. A. Diddle Arena; Bowling Green, KY
2/20/1992	No. 17	Central Florida	W 90–77 ^{OT}	17–6 (10-2)	E. A. Diddle Arena; Bowling Green, KY
2/23/1992	No. 16	New Orleans	W 78–62	18–6 (11-2)	E. A. Diddle Arena; Bowling Green, KY
2/27/1992	No. 16	at Arkansas State	L 53–63	18–7 (11-3)	Convocation Center; Jonesboro, AR
3/1/1992	No. 19	SW Louisiana	W 90–33	19–7 (12-3)	E. A. Diddle Arena; Bowling Green, KY
3/8/1992	No. 16	Louisiana Tech	W 82–63	20–7 (13-3)	E. A. Diddle Arena; Bowling Green, KY
1992 Sun Belt Conference women's basketball tournament
3/12/1992	No. 16	Central Florida; SBC Tournament Quarterfinal	W 89–45	21–7	E. A. Diddle Arena; Bowling Green, KY
3/13/1992	No. 16	Louisiana Tech; SBC Tournament Semifinal	W 72–66 ^{OT}	22–7	E. A. Diddle Arena; Bowling Green, KY
3/15/1992	No. 15	Arkansas State; SBC Tournament Final	W 65–62	23–7	E. A. Diddle Arena; Bowling Green, KY
1992 NCAA Division I women's basketball tournament
3/21/1992*	No. 15 (ME4)	No. 18 (ME5) Alabama; Mideast Region Second Round	W 98–68	24–7	E. A. Diddle Arena; Bowling Green, KY
3/26/1992*	No. 15 (ME4)	vs. No. 2 (ME1) Tennessee; Sweet Sixteen	W 75–70	25–7	Mackey Arena; West Lafayette, IN
3/28/1992*	No. 15 (ME4)	vs. No. 8 (ME2) Maryland; Elite Eight	W 75–70	26–7	Mackey Arena; West Lafayette, IN
4/4/1992*	No. 15 (ME4)	vs. No. 10 (MW8) SW Missouri; Final Four	W 84–72	27–7	Los Angeles Memorial Sports Arena; Los Angeles, CA
4/5/1992*	No. 15 (ME4)	vs. No. 3 (W1) Stanford; National Final	L 62–78	27–8	Los Angeles Memorial Sports Arena; Los Angeles, CA
*Non-conference game. ^{#}Rankings from AP Poll. (#) Tournament seedings in parentheses.
