= Sun Belt Conference women's basketball tournament =

Sun Belt women's basketball tournament
- Conference basketball championship
- Sport: Women's basketball
- Conference: Sun Belt Conference
- Number of teams: 14
- Format: Single-elimination tournament
- Current stadium: Pensacola Bay Center
- Current location: Pensacola, Florida
- Played: 1983–present
- Last contest: 2025
- Current champion: Arkansas State
- Most championships: Western Kentucky (9)
- TV partner: ESPN+
- Official website: Sun Belt Women's Basketball

The Sun Belt Conference women's basketball tournament has been played every year since the 1982–83 academic year. The winner of the tournament is guaranteed an automatic berth into the NCAA Division I women's basketball tournament.

In 2007, the Sun Belt received an at-large berth, as Louisiana–Lafayette (regular season champ of the West Division) received an invite to the national tournament despite losing in the conference tournament final. The following year, the Sun Belt received an at-large berth again, as Middle Tennessee State received an invite to the national tournament. In 2010, it happened again, as Little Rock received an at-large bid, having entered the conference tourney as a #1 seed, before losing to Middle Tennessee in double overtime.

The current tournament format, featuring all conference members, has been in place since the 2020–21 season. The tournament is being held in Pensacola, Florida through at least the 2024–25 season. First- and second-round games are played simultaneously at Hartsell Arena on the campus of Pensacola State College and the Pensacola Bay Center, with semifinals and finals at the Bay Center.

== Champions by year ==
Year	Champion	Score	Runner-up	Location
1983	Old Dominion	78–67	Western Kentucky	ODU Fieldhouse; Norfolk, Virginia
1984	Old Dominion	78–69	South Alabama	ODU Fieldhouse; Norfolk, Virginia
1985	Old Dominion	76–63	Western Kentucky	ODU Fieldhouse; Norfolk, Virginia
1986	Western Kentucky	69–61	Old Dominion	E. A. Diddle Arena; Bowling Green, Kentucky
1987	Old Dominion	64–61	South Alabama	ODU Fieldhouse
1988	UNC Charlotte	74–69	VCU	USF Sun Dome; Tampa, Florida
1989	Western Kentucky	67–54	South Alabama	E. A. Diddle Arena
1990	Old Dominion	72–57	UAB	ODU Fieldhouse
1991	Western Kentucky	81–73	UAB	UAB Arena; Birmingham, Alabama
1992	Western Kentucky	65–62	Arkansas State	E. A. Diddle Arena
1993	Western Kentucky	81–73	Louisiana Tech	Thomas Assembly Center; Ruston, Louisiana
1994	Louisiana Tech	68–43	Western Kentucky	E. A. Diddle Arena
1995	Western Kentucky	71–68	Louisiana Tech	E. A. Diddle Arena
1996	Louisiana Tech	71–53	Western Kentucky	ASU Convocation Center; Jonesboro, Arkansas
1997	Louisiana Tech	80–68	Western Kentucky	E. A. Diddle Arena
1998	Louisiana Tech	69–68	Western Kentucky	Thomas Assembly Center
1999	Louisiana Tech	84–60	FIU	ASU Convocation Center
2000	Louisiana Tech	97–94	Western Kentucky	E.A. Diddle Arena
2001	Louisiana Tech	67–55	Denver	Mitchell Center; Mobile, Alabama
2002	FIU	66–49	North Texas	Lakefront Arena; New Orleans, Louisiana
2003	Western Kentucky	86–83	Middle Tennessee	E.A. Diddle Arena
2004	Middle Tennessee	79–57	Western Kentucky	E.A. Diddle Arena
2005	Middle Tennessee	67–52	Louisiana-Lafayette (Note: Now known as Louisiana.)	UNT Coliseum; Denton, Texas
2006	Middle Tennessee	84–73	Western Kentucky	Murphy Center; Murfreesboro, Tennessee
2007	Middle Tennessee	77–67	Louisiana-Lafayette	first round at campus sites; rest at Cajundome, Lafayette, Louisiana
2008	Western Kentucky	65–49	Middle Tennessee	first round games at higher seed; rest at Mitchell Center
2009	Middle Tennessee	74–54	UALR (Note: Known as Little Rock since 2015)	Summit Arena; Hot Springs, Arkansas
2010	Middle Tennessee	70–68^{OT}	UALR	Summit Arena; Hot Springs, Arkansas
2011	UALR	66–59	Western Kentucky	Summit Arena; Hot Springs, Arkansas
2012	UALR	71–70^{OT}	Middle Tennessee	Summit Arena; Hot Springs, Arkansas
2013	Middle Tennessee	53–48	UALR	Summit Arena; Hot Springs, Arkansas
2014	Western Kentucky	61–60	Arkansas State	Lakefront Arena
2015	UALR	78–72	Arkansas State	Lakefront Arena
2016	Troy	61–60^{OT}	Little Rock	Lakefront Arena
2017	Troy	78–64	Louisiana	Lakefront Arena
2018	Little Rock	54–53	Texas State	Lakefront Arena
2019	Little Rock	57–56	South Alabama	First three rounds: Campus sites Semifinals and final: Lakefront Arena
2020	Canceled due to the COVID-19 pandemic			
2021	Troy	73–65	Louisiana	Hartsell Arena – Select first-and second-round games Pensacola Bay Center – All remaining games (Pensacola, FL)
2022	UT Arlington	76–61	Troy	Pensacola Bay Center
2023	James Madison	81–51	Texas State	Pensacola Bay Center
2024	Marshall	95–92^{OT}	James Madison	Pensacola Bay Center
2025	Arkansas State	86-79^{OT}	James Madison	Pensacola Bay Center
2026	James Madison	69-52	Troy	Pensacola Bay Center

== Performance by school ==
School	Championships	Championship Years
Western Kentucky	9	1986, 1989, 1991, 1992, 1993, 1995, 2003, 2008, 2014
Louisiana Tech	7	1994, 1996, 1997, 1998, 1999, 2000, 2001
Middle Tennessee	7	2004, 2005, 2006, 2007, 2009, 2010, 2013
Little Rock	5	2011, 2012, 2015, 2018, 2019
Old Dominion	5	1983, 1984, 1985, 1987, 1990
Troy	3	2016, 2017, 2021
James Madison	2	2023, 2026
Arkansas State	1	2025
Marshall	1	2024
Charlotte	1	1988
FIU	1	2002
UT Arlington	1	2022
Appalachian State	0	
Coastal Carolina	0	
Georgia Southern	0	
Georgia State	0	
Louisiana	0	
Louisiana–Monroe	0	
South Alabama	0	
Southern Miss	0	
Texas State	0	
TOTAL	39	

- Schools highlighted in pink are former members of the Sun Belt.

== See also ==
- Sun Belt Conference men's basketball tournament
