= Linda Harper =

American basketball player and coach

Biographical details
- Born: October 2, 1942
- Died: February 15, 2014 (aged 71)
- Education: Northwestern State University of Louisiana; Northeast Louisiana University

Coaching career (HC unless noted)
- 1978–1990: Northeast Louisiana

Accomplishments and honors

Championships
- NCAA Regional—Final Four (1985)

Linda Faye Harper (October 2, 1942 – February 15, 2014) was a former college and professional basketball coach.

== Early life ==
Harper studied at Northwestern State University and graduated with a Bachelor of Science degree in 1965. She studied later at Northeast Louisiana University and graduated with a Master's degree in Education in 1972.

== College career ==
In 1978, she was hired to coach the Northeast Louisiana women's basketball team. She coached the Indians (now referred to as the Warhawks) until 1980. She won 212 games with 121 losses while going 91–14 in conference play, bolstered by players such as Lisa Ingram and Eun Jung Ok. She was named Southland Conference Coach of the Year in 1983 and 1985). They won 30 games in 1985 (with two separate 15-game winning streaks), best in the nation, while reaching a ranking of #2 in the AP Poll. In the 1985 NCAA Division I women's basketball tournament, the team advanced to the Final Four before losing to Old Dominion. It is currently the only time the team has reached the Final Four in program history and also the last time the program has won an NCAA Tournament game.

The following year, the Indians were found by the NCAA to have committed six infractions. They were put on probation and declared ineligible for postseason play for the 1986 tournament due to illegal recruiting of Chana Perry (who had scored 31 points in the Elite Eight victory over Louisiana Tech), who was declared ineligible for the remainderof the 1985–86 season. Harper was forbidden to recruit outside the campus for one year. The program was the first women's program to be given sanctions by the NCAA in their history.

She retired in 1990 and was named to the program's Sports Hall of Fame in 1999. She was the all-time winningest coach in ULM history until Mona Martin passed her in 2009.

In the 1990s, she coached the AAU Monroe Magic.

== Head coaching record ==
Record table
Season	Team	Overall	Conference	Standing	Postseason
Northeast Louisiana Indians (NCAA University Division independent) (1978–1982)
1978–79	NE Louisiana	16–12			
1979–80	NE Louisiana	7–23			
1980–81	NE Louisiana	9–18			
1981–82	NE Louisiana	12–12			
AIAW:		81–125			
Northeast Louisiana Indians (Southland Conference) (1982–1990)
1982–83	NE Louisiana	26–6	5–0		NCAA First Round
1983–84	NE Louisiana	23–4	12–0		NCAA Regional
1984–85	NE Louisiana	30–2	12–0		NCAA Final Four
1985–86	NE Louisiana	26–3	12–0		Northern Lights Invite Champions
1986–87	NE Louisiana	14–10	9–3		NCAA First Round
1987–88	NE Louisiana	19–10	11–3		
1988–89	NE Louisiana	19–9	11–3		
1989–90	NE Louisiana	14–12	8–5		
Total:		215–139 (.607)			
National champion Postseason invitational champion Conference regular season champion Conference regular season and conference tournament champion Division regular season champion Division regular season and conference tournament champion Conference tournament champion
