= Sun Belt basketball tournament =

The phrase Sun Belt basketball tournament may refer to:

- Sun Belt Conference men's basketball tournament
- Sun Belt Conference women's basketball tournament
