= 1984–85 Georgia Lady Bulldogs basketball team =

Intercollegiate basketball season

1984–85 Georgia Lady Bulldogs basketball

SEC Eastern division champions Buckeye Classic champions Mid-America Classic champions

NCAA tournament, Runner-up
- Conference: Southeastern Conference

Ranking
- AP: No. 8
- Record: 29–5 (7–1 SEC)
- Head coach: Andy Landers (6th season)
- Home arena: Stegeman Coliseum

1984–85 SEC women's basketball standings
	Conf.				Overall
Team	W		L	PCT	W		L	PCT
Eastern Division
No. 8 Georgia	7	–	1	.875	29	–	5	.853
Florida	4	–	4	.500	22	–	9	.710
No. 13 Tennessee^{†}	4	–	4	.500	22	–	10	.688
Kentucky	3	–	5	.375	16	–	12	.571
Vanderbilt	2	–	6	.250	14	–	13	.519
Western Division
No. 6 Ole Miss	8	–	0	1.000	29	–	3	.906
No. 10 Auburn	5	–	3	.625	25	–	6	.806
LSU	4	–	4	.500	20	–	9	.690
Alabama	3	–	5	.375	18	–	10	.643
Mississippi State	0	–	8	.000	8	–	19	.296
† 1985 SEC tournament winner Rankings from AP poll

The 1984–85 Georgia Lady Bulldogs women's basketball team represented University of Georgia in the 1984–85 college basketball season. The Lady Bulldogs, led by sixth-year head coach Andy Landers, played their home games at Stegeman Coliseum and were members of the Southeastern Conference. They finished the season 29–5, 7–1 in SEC play to finish as Eastern division champions. Georgia was the No. 2 seed in the West region of the NCAA tournament. They defeated Tennessee Tech, No. 18 UCLA, and No. 3 Long Beach State to reach their second NCAA Final Four in three seasons. In the National semifinal game, Georgia defeated No. 14 Western Kentucky to reach the National championship game. After holding a 31–22 lead in the first half, foul trouble caught up to the Lady Bulldogs and they were defeated by No. 5 Old Dominion, 70–65, to finish runner-up.

== Roster ==
1984–85 Georgia Bulldogs women's basketball team
Players
Coaches

Pos.	#	Name	Height	Year	Previous school	Hometown
G/F	5	Teresa Edwards	5 ft 11 in (1.8 m)	Jr	Cairo HS	Cairo, Georgia
F/C	32	Katrina McClain	6 ft 1 in (1.85 m)	So	St. Andrews HS	Charleston, South Carolina
F	43	Lisa O'Connor	6 ft 1 in (1.85 m)	Jr		Cartersville, Georgia
F/C	45	Janet Harris	6 ft 3 in (1.91 m)	Sr	John Marshall	Chicago, Illinois

Head coach

Andy Landers

Assistant coach(es)

Legend

- (C) Team captain
- (S) Suspended
- (I) Ineligible
- (W) Walk-on
- Injured
- Current redshirt

== Schedule ==
Date time, TV	Rank^{#}	Opponent^{#}	Result	Record	Site (attendance) city, state
Regular season
Nov 21, 1984*	No. 1	at Middle Tennessee State	W 84–73	1–0	Murphy Center; Murfreesboro, Tennessee
Nov 23, 1984*	No. 1	at Tennessee State	W 86–69	2–0	Gentry Complex; Nashville, Tennessee
Nov 26, 1984*	No. 1	No. 3 Texas	L 69–83	2–1	Stegeman Coliseum; Athens, Georgia
Nov 29, 1984*	No. 3	at Georgia Tech	W 100–69	3–1	Alexander Memorial Coliseum; Atlanta, Georgia
Dec 2, 1984*	No. 3	Chattanooga	W 91–61	4–1	Stegeman Coliseum; Athens, Georgia
Dec 9, 1984	No. 3	No. 15 Tennessee	W 78–72	5–1 (1–0)	Stegeman Coliseum; Athens, Georgia
Dec 10, 1984*	No. 3	Georgia Southern	W 76–56	6–1	Stegeman Coliseum; Athens, Georgia
Dec 12, 1984*	No. 3	at Western Kentucky	L 67–72 ^{OT}	6–2	E. A. Diddle Arena; Bowling Green, Kentucky
Dec 14, 1984*	No. 5	vs. No. 16 Texas Tech; Mid-America Classic	W 80–68	7–2	Hearnes Center; Columbia, Missouri
Dec 15, 1984*	No. 5	at No. 18 Missouri; Mid-America Classic	W 70–67	8–2	Hearnes Center; Columbia, Missouri
Dec 28, 1984*	No. 5	vs. No. 14 Rutgers; Buckeye Classic	W 58–57	9–2	St. John Arena; Columbus, Ohio
Dec 29, 1984*	No. 5	at No. 9 Ohio State; Buckeye Classic	W 58–57	10–2	St. John Arena; Columbus, Ohio
Jan 2, 1985*	No. 5	at Cincinnati	W 89–61	11–2	Riverfront Coliseum; Cincinnati, Ohio
Jan 3, 1985*	No. 5	at Xavier	W 106–38	12–2	Schmidt Fieldhouse; Cincinnati, Ohio
Jan 6, 1985*	No. 5	at No. 6 USC	W 77–56	13–2	L.A. Sports Arena; Los Angeles, California
Jan 12, 1985	No. 5	at Florida	W 88–73	14–2 (2–0)	O'Connell Center; Gainesville, Florida
Jan 15, 1985*	No. 5	at Mercer	W 94–78	15–2	Porter Gym; Macon, Georgia
Jan 17, 1985*	No. 5	at Georgia Southern	W 86–59	16–2	Hanner Fieldhouse; Statesboro, Georgia
Jan 19, 1985	No. 3	Florida	W 67–56	17–2 (3–0)	Stegeman Coliseum; Athens, Georgia
Jan 21, 1985*	No. 3	Florida A&M	W 85–50	18–2	Stegeman Coliseum; Athens, Georgia
Jan 27, 1985	No. 3	at Vanderbilt	W 83–67	19–2 (4–0)	Memorial Gymnasium; Nashville, Tennessee
Jan 29, 1985	No. 3	at No. 17 Kentucky	L 57–61	19–3 (4–1)	Rupp Arena; Lexington, Kentucky
Feb 2, 1985	No. 5	at Tennessee	W 72–56	20–3 (5–1)	Stokely Athletic Center; Knoxville, Tennessee
Feb 6, 1985*	No. 6	Tennessee State	W 102–55	21–3	Stegeman Coliseum; Athens, Georgia
Feb 10, 1985	No. 6	Vanderbilt	W 95–71	22–3 (6–1)	Stegeman Coliseum; Athens, Georgia
Feb 13, 1985*	No. 6	Georgia State	W 99–57	23–3	Stegeman Coliseum; Athens, Georgia
Feb 17, 1985	No. 6	Kentucky	W 87–65	24–3 (7–1)	Stegeman Coliseum; Athens, Georgia
SEC tournament
Feb 28, 1985*	No. 6	Vanderbilt; Quarterfinals	W 79–67	25–3	Stegeman Coliseum; Athens, Georgia
Mar 3, 1985*	No. 6	vs. No. 9 Auburn; Second round	L 65–80	25–4	Stegeman Coliseum; Athens, Georgia
NCAA tournament
Mar 16, 1985*	(2 W) No. 8	(7 W) Tennessee Tech; Second round	W 91–74	26–4	Stegeman Coliseum; Athens, Georgia
Mar 21, 1985*	(2 W) No. 8	at (6 W) No. 18 UCLA; Regional Semifinal – Sweet Sixteen	W 78–42	27–4	Pauley Pavilion; Los Angeles, California
Mar 23, 1985*	(2 W) No. 8	vs. (1 MW) No. 3 Long Beach State; Regional Final – Elite Eight	W 97–82	28–4	Pauley Pavilion; Los Angeles, California
March 29, 1985*	(2 W) No. 8	vs. (4 ME) No. 14 Western Kentucky; National semifinal – Final Four	W 91–78	29–4	Frank Erwin Center; Austin, Texas
March 31, 1985*	(2 W) No. 8	vs. (1 E) No. 5 Old Dominion; National championship	L 65–70	29–5	Frank Erwin Center (7,597); Austin, Texas
*Non-conference game. ^{#}Rankings from AP Poll. (#) Tournament seedings in parentheses. All times are in Eastern Time.
