= Andy Landers =

American college basketball coach (born 1952)

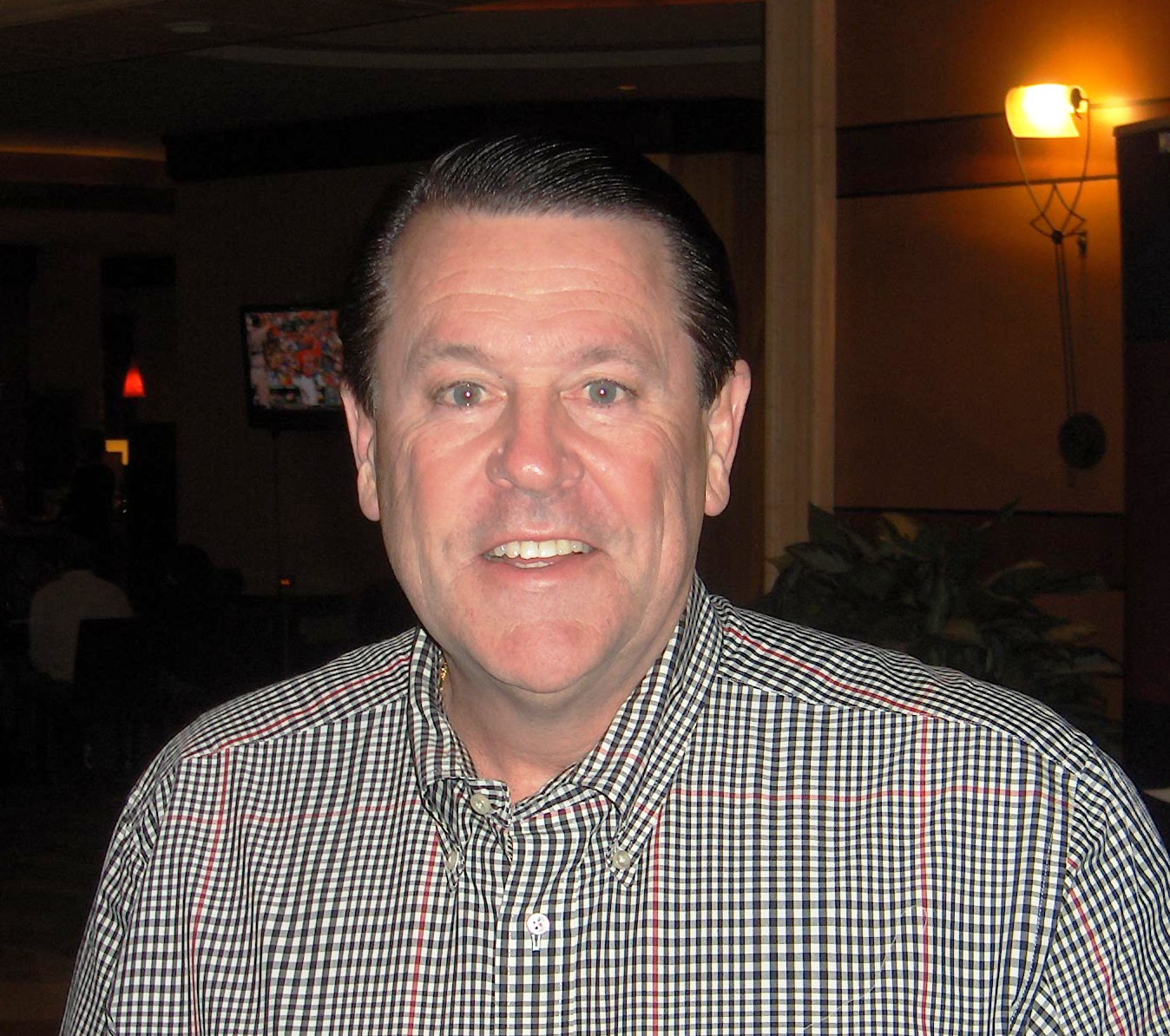
- Landers in 2011

Biographical details
- Born: October 8, 1952 (age 74); Maryville, Tennessee, U.S.
- Education: Tennessee Tech

Coaching career (HC unless noted)
- 1975–1979: Roane State CC
- 1979–2015: Georgia

Head coaching record
- Overall: 866–299 (.743) (college); 82–21 (.796) (junior college)
- Tournaments: 51–27 (NCAA); 3–0 (NWIT)

Accomplishments and honors

Championships
- 7× SEC Champion (1983, 1984, 1986, 1991, 1996, 1997, 2000); 4× SEC Tournament Champion (1983, 1984, 1986, 2001); 5× NCAA Regional—Final Four (1983, 1985, 1995, 1996, 1999)

Awards
- 3× SEC Coach of the Year (1984, 1986, 1996); 4× NCAA Coach of the Year (1986, 1987, 1996, 2000)
- Women's Basketball Hall of Fame

Andrew Grady Landers (born October 8, 1952) is an American former college basketball coach who was head women's basketball coach at the University of Georgia from 1979 to 2015.

Landers graduated from Friendsville (Tenn.) High School in 1970, then attended and graduated from Tennessee Technological University in 1974 with a degree in Physical Education.

In 1975, Landers began his coaching career at Roane State Community College, compiling an 82–21 record over four seasons before Vince Dooley made the 26-year-old his first hire as athletic director at Georgia.

The Lady Bulldog program Landers inherited had compiled a 37–85 record in its first six seasons and had virtually no budget. However, in his first season, Landers led the Lady Bulldogs to a 16–12 record, and by his fourth year in Athens, he had taken them to their first of five NCAA Final Fours. By 1985, the Lady Dogs were in the National Championship game.

During his career at Georgia, Landers was named National Coach of the Year four times and Southeastern Conference (SEC) Coach of the Year three times, and led the Lady Dogs to 23 NCAA Tournaments, five Final Fours, seven SEC regular-season titles, four SEC tournament championships, and 21 twenty-win seasons. He coached two Olympians (who won a combined six Gold Medals), 11 Kodak All-Americans, and 25 future Women's National Basketball Association (WNBA) players. Landers was awarded the US Basketball Writers Association (USBWA) Coach of the Year award in 2000. At the time he retired, Georgia's five Final Four appearances (all under Landers) ranked sixth among all schools.

Landers recorded his 600th career win in just 784 games, which at the time made him the fifth-quickest (out of fourteen total) NCAA Division I women's basketball head coaches to reach the mark. On February 24, 2013, Landers got his 900th career win in Georgia's 73–54 victory at Ole Miss.

Landers was a member of the ninth group of inductees (the class of 2007) in the Women's Basketball Hall of Fame. He is also a member of the Georgia Sports Hall of Fame as the state's winningest college basketball coach at any level.

Landers announced his decision to retire on March 16, 2015. He finished his career with 944 total wins, which ranked fifth all-time among women's college basketball coaches. He was succeeded by his then-assistant coach Joni Taylor.

Since his retirement, Landers has worked for ESPN and its sister-channel SEC Network as a women's college basketball analyst.

== Personal life ==
He married the former Pam McClellan in 1981 and has two children, Andrea Lauren and Andrew Joseph.

== Head coaching record ==
Record table
Season	Team	Overall	Conference	Standing	Postseason
Roane State Raiders (Tennessee Junior and Community College Athletic Association) (1975–1979)
1975–76	Roane State	13–9			
1976–77	Roane State	23–3			
1977–78	Roane State	21–4			
1978–79	Roane State	25–5			
Roane State:		82–21 (.796)			
Georgia Lady Bulldogs (Southeastern Conference) (1979–2015)
1979–80	Georgia	16–12			GAIAW Tournament First Round
1980–81	Georgia	27–10			NWIT Champions
1981–82	Georgia	21–9	4–3		NCAA first round
1982–83	Georgia	27–7	4–4	3rd (East)	NCAA Final Four
1983–84	Georgia	30–3	8–1	T–1st (East)	NCAA Elite Eight
1984–85	Georgia	29–5	7–1	1st (East)	NCAA Runner-Up
1985–86	Georgia	30–2	9–0	1st	NCAA Sweet 16
1986–87	Georgia	27–5	7–2	T–2nd	NCAA Sweet 16
1987–88	Georgia	21–10	5–4	T–4th	NCAA Sweet 16
1988–89	Georgia	23–7	6–3	3rd	NCAA second round
1989–90	Georgia	25–5	6–3	4th	NCAA second round
1990–91	Georgia	28–4	9–0	1st	NCAA Elite Eight
1991–92	Georgia	19–11	6–5	T–4th	
1992–93	Georgia	21–13	4–7	T–8th	NCAA second round
1993–94	Georgia	17–11	5–6	T–7th	
1994–95	Georgia	28–5	8–3	T–2nd	NCAA Final Four
1995–96	Georgia	28–5	10–1	1st	NCAA Runner-Up
1996–97	Georgia	25–6	11–1	1st	NCAA Elite Eight
1997–98	Georgia	17–11	8–6	5th	NCAA first round
1998–99	Georgia	27–7	9–5	3rd	NCAA Final Four
1999–2000	Georgia	32–4	13–1	T–1st	NCAA Elite Eight
2000–01	Georgia	27–6	11–3	T–2nd	NCAA second round
2001–02	Georgia	19–11	6–8	8th	NCAA first round
2002–03	Georgia	21–10	10–4	T–3rd	NCAA Sweet 16
2003–04	Georgia	25–10	8–6	T–4th	NCAA Elite Eight
2004–05	Georgia	24–10	9–5	4th	NCAA Sweet 16
2005–06	Georgia	23–9	10–4	3rd	NCAA Sweet 16
2006–07	Georgia	27–7	11–3	2nd	NCAA Sweet 16
2007–08	Georgia	23–10	8–6	T–4th	NCAA second round
2008–09	Georgia	18–14	7–7	7th	NCAA first round
2009–10	Georgia	25–9	9–7	T–3rd	NCAA Sweet 16
2010–11	Georgia	23–11	10–6	T–3rd	NCAA Sweet 16
2011–12	Georgia	22–9	11–5	3rd	NCAA first round
2012–13	Georgia	28–7	11–4	3rd	NCAA Elite Eight
2013–14	Georgia	20–12	7–9	9th	NCAA first round
2014–15	Georgia	19–12	6–10	T–9th	
Georgia:		862–299 (.742)	273–144 (.655)		
Total:		944–320 (.747)			
National champion Postseason invitational champion Conference regular season champion Conference regular season and conference tournament champion Division regular season champion Division regular season and conference tournament champion Conference tournament champion

== See also ==
- List of college women's basketball career coaching wins leaders
