= 1984–85 Northeast Louisiana Indians women's basketball team =

American college basketball season

1984–85 Northeast Louisiana Indians women's basketball

Southland Conference champions Dial Classic champions Kangaroo Classic champions

NCAA tournament, Final Four
- Conference: Southland Conference

Ranking
- AP: No. 2
- Record: 30–2 (12–0 Southland)
- Head coach: Linda Harper (7th season)
- Home arena: Ewing Coliseum

1984–85 Southland Conference women's basketball standings
	Conf.				Overall
Team	W		L	PCT	W		L	PCT
No. 2 NE Louisiana	12	–	0	1.000	30	–	2	.938
UT Arlington	8	–	4	.667	13	–	14	.481
Lamar	7	–	5	.583	12	–	15	.444
Arkansas State	5	–	7	.417	12	–	13	.480
McNeese State	5	–	7	.417	11	–	17	.393
Louisiana–Lafayette	4	–	8	.333	8	–	18	.308
North Texas	1	–	11	.083	4	–	22	.154
Rankings from AP poll

The 1984–85 Northeast Louisiana Indians women's basketball team represented the Northeast Louisiana University during the 1984–85 NCAA Division I women's basketball season. The Indians, led by 7th year head coach Linda Harper. The Indians played their home games at the Fant–Ewing Coliseum and were members of the Southland Conference.

The Indians swept through the Southland Conference with a 12–0 conference record, and were invited to the NCAA tournament for the third straight season. NE Louisiana entered tournament play with a No. 2 ranking, but only received the No. 2 seed in the Midwest region. The team defeated No. 7 seed Missouri, No. 3 seed Auburn, and No. 1 seed Louisiana Tech to reach the first, and only, Final Four in program history. In the National semifinal round, the Indians were beaten by eventual National champion Old Dominion, 57–47, to finish with a 30–2 record.

== Roster ==
1984–85 Northeast Louisiana Indians women's basketball team
Players
Coaches

Pos.	#	Name	Height	Year	Previous school	Hometown
C	23	Chana Perry	6 ft 4 in (1.93 m)	So		Brookhaven, Mississippi
C	33	Lisa Ingram	6 ft 3 in (1.91 m)	Jr		Fort Lauderdale, Florida

Head coach

Linda Harper

Assistant coach(es)

Legend

- (C) Team captain
- (S) Suspended
- (I) Ineligible
- (W) Walk-on
- Injured
- Current redshirt

Roster

== Schedule ==
Date time, TV	Rank^{#}	Opponent^{#}	Result	Record	Site (attendance) city, state
Regular Season
Nov 19, 1984*	No. 7	Stephen F. Austin	W 90–51	1–0	Ewing Coliseum; Monroe, Louisiana
Nov 23, 1984	No. 7	at Mississippi College	W 100–81	2–0	A. E. Wood Coliseum; Clinton, Mississippi
Nov 30, 1984	No. 7	vs. No. 12 Tennessee; Dial Classic	W 68–53	3–0	Williams Arena; Minneapolis, Minnesota
Dec 1, 1984	No. 7	at Minnesota; Dial Classic	W 82–66	4–0	Williams Arena; Minneapolis, Minnesota
Dec 3, 1984	No. 6	at Ole Miss	W 70–67 ^{OT}	5–0	Tad Smith Coliseum; Oxford, Mississippi
Jan 22, 1985*	No. 4	at No. 6 Louisiana Tech	L 77–79 ^{OT}	15–1	Thomas Assembly Center; Ruston, Louisiana
Feb 9, 1985	No. 4	Louisiana–Lafayette	W 60–34	20–1 (6–0)	Ewing Coliseum; Monroe, Louisiana
Feb 11, 1985*	No. 4	No. 6 Louisiana Tech	W 80–67	21–1	Ewing Coliseum; Monroe, Louisiana
Mar 5, 1985	No. 2	at Louisiana–Lafayette	W 59–49	27–1 (12–0)	Blackham Coliseum; Lafayette, Louisiana
NCAA Tournament
Mar 16, 1985*	(2 MW) No. 2	(7 MW) Missouri; First round	W 85–84 ^{OT}	28–1	Ewing Coliseum; Monroe, Louisiana
Mar 22, 1985*	(2 MW) No. 2	(3 MW) No. 10 Auburn; Regional Semifinal – Sweet Sixteen	W 76–71	29–1	Ewing Coliseum; Monroe, Louisiana
Mar 24, 1985*	(2 MW) No. 2	(1 MW) No. 4 Louisiana Tech; Regional Final – Elite Eight	W 85–76	30–1	Ewing Coliseum; Monroe, Louisiana
Mar 29, 1985*	(2 MW) No. 2	vs. (1 E) No. 5 Old Dominion; National semifinal – Final Four	L 47–57	30–2	Frank Erwin Center (7,648); Austin, Texas
*Non-conference game. ^{#}Rankings from AP Poll. (#) Tournament seedings in parentheses. All times are in Central Time.

== Rankings ==
Ranking movements Legend: ██ Increase in ranking ██ Decrease in ranking
	Week																
Poll	1	2	3	4	5	6	7	8	9	10	11	12	13	14	15	16	Final
AP	7	7	7	6	5	5	5	4	4	4	6	4	4	2	2	2	2
