= Arkansas State Red Wolves basketball =

Arkansas State Red Wolves basketball may refer to either of the basketball teams that represent Arkansas State University:

- Arkansas State Red Wolves men's basketball
- Arkansas State Red Wolves women's basketball
