= NCAA Division I basketball tournament Most Outstanding Player =

College basketball award

- Sport: College Basketball
- Competition: NCAA Division I men's basketball tournament NCAA Division I women's basketball tournament
- Awarded for: Most Outstanding Player
- Country: United States

History
- First award: 1939 (men); 1982 (women)
- Editions: 87 (men); 44 (women)
- Most wins: Breanna Stewart (4)
- Most recent: Elliot Cadeau, Michigan (men); Lauren Betts, UCLA (women)

The Most Outstanding Player (MOP) is awarded to one player after the conclusion of the championship game of the NCAA Division I men's and women's basketball tournaments. The award is also often referred to as the Final Four Most Outstanding Player, referencing the conclusion of the Final Four semifinals and championship games. Accredited media members at the championship game vote on the award.

The players that win the award are predominantly members of the championship team. However, twelve men and one woman have won it as players on teams that did not win the championship. On the men's side, runner-up Houston's Akeem Olajuwon (Note: Olajuwon later changed his first name's spelling from Akeem to Hakeem to use the original Arabic spelling.) was the last to do so in 1983, while runner-up Virginia's Dawn Staley was the only woman to do so, in 1991. Of the twelve men, three players have won the award while not playing in the championship game; the other nine played for the runner-up. The teams for two of these players won the national third place game, and the other's team lost the national third place game. (Note: A national third place game was contested in the men's tournament from 1946 to 1981. The women's tournament never had a third place game.)

One player's award has been officially vacated (not recognized) by the NCAA, while another player's was vacated but later restored. In 1971, Howard Porter won the award despite Villanova losing to UCLA in the championship game. Villanova later vacated their entire season. Meanwhile, Luke Hancock had his MOP award stripped when the NCAA vacated Louisville's 2013 national championship. His award was restored in 2019 when a lawsuit brought against the NCAA was settled, clearing his name of any wrongdoing in the team scandal.

== Key ==
*	Awarded a national player of the year award that same season: Men – Sporting News; Oscar Robertson Trophy; Associated Press; NABC; UPI; Naismith; Wooden; Adolph Rupp Trophy; Helms; Women – Wade; Associated Press; Naismith; Wooden; WBCA
#	Team lost the National Championship game
†	Team won the National Third Place game
‡	Team lost the National Third Place game
Player (X)	Denotes the number of times the player has been awarded the MOP at that point
Italics	Award/Appearance officially vacated by NCAA

== Men's tournament ==
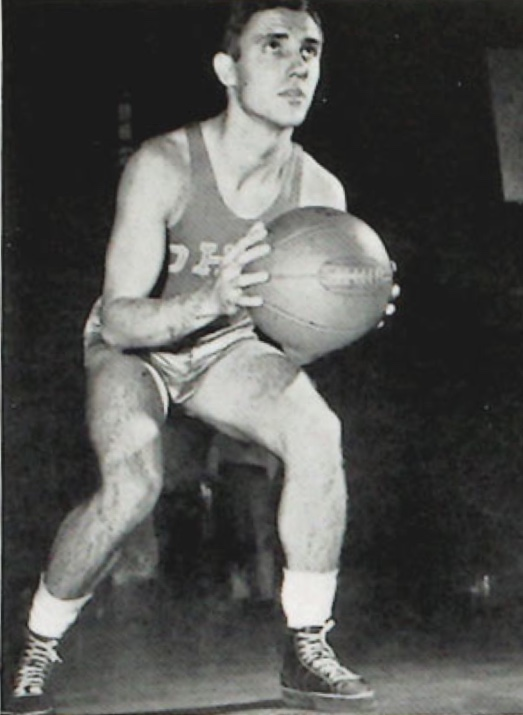
Jimmy Hull, Ohio State, 1939

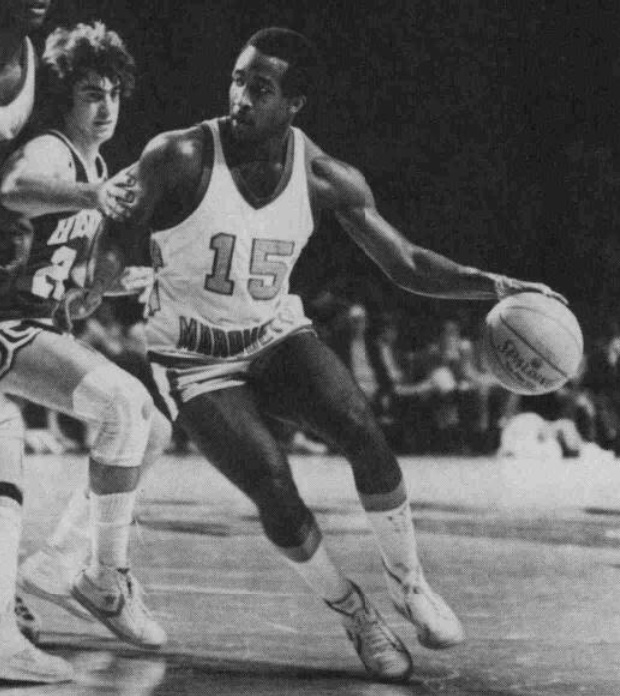
Butch Lee, Marquette, 1977

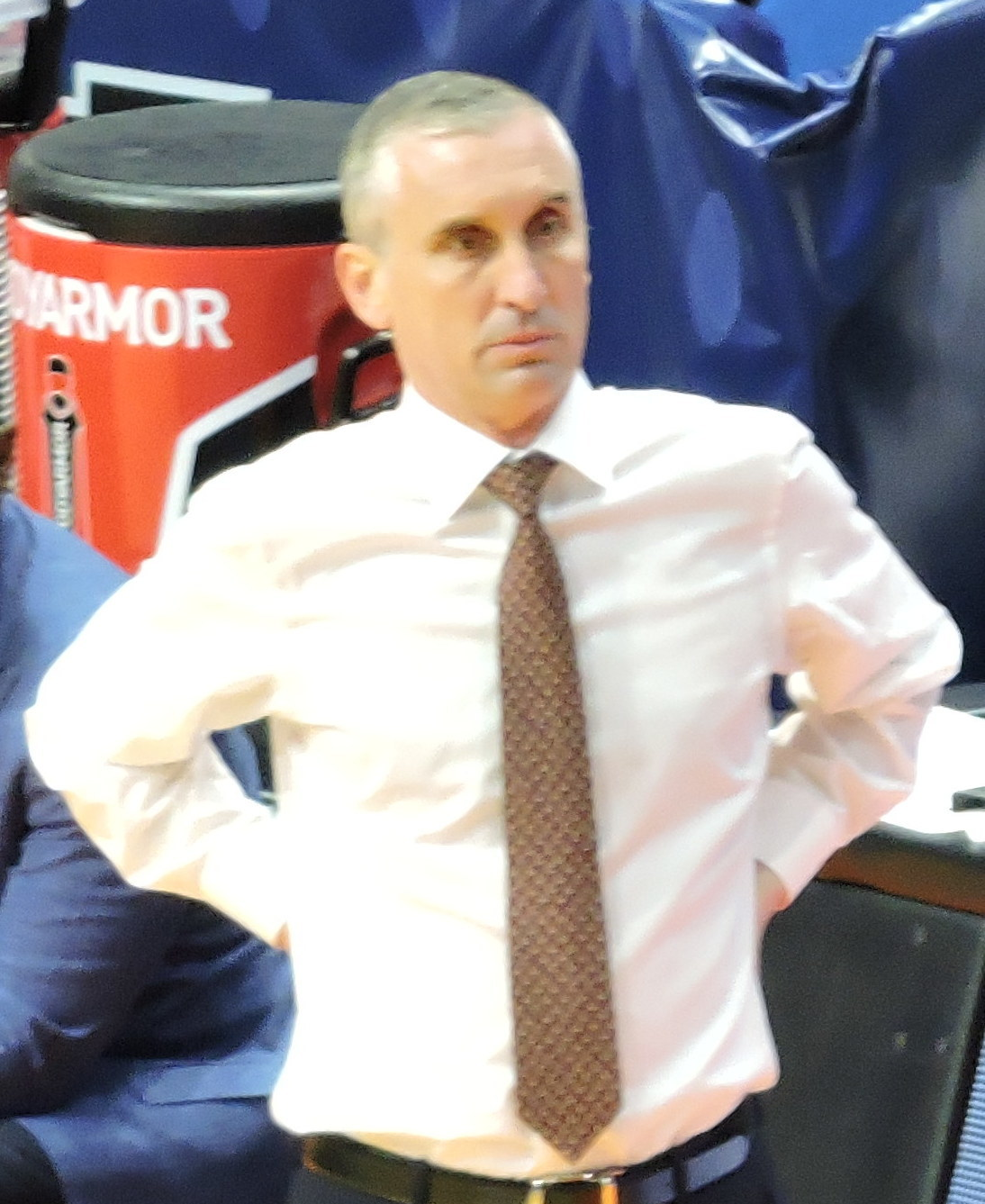
Bobby Hurley, Duke, 1991

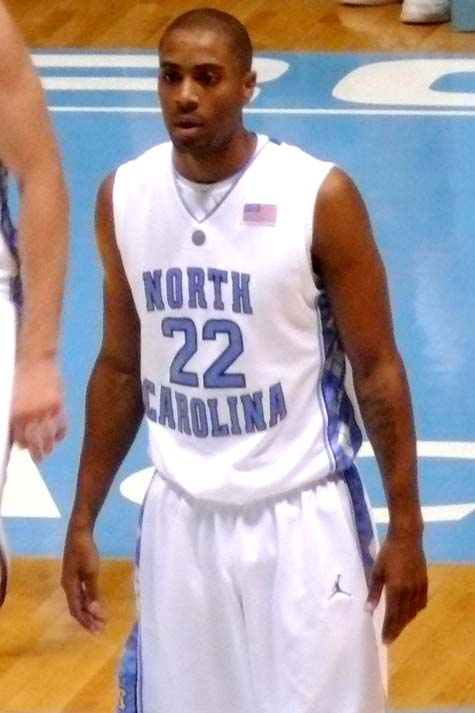
Wayne Ellington, North Carolina, 2009

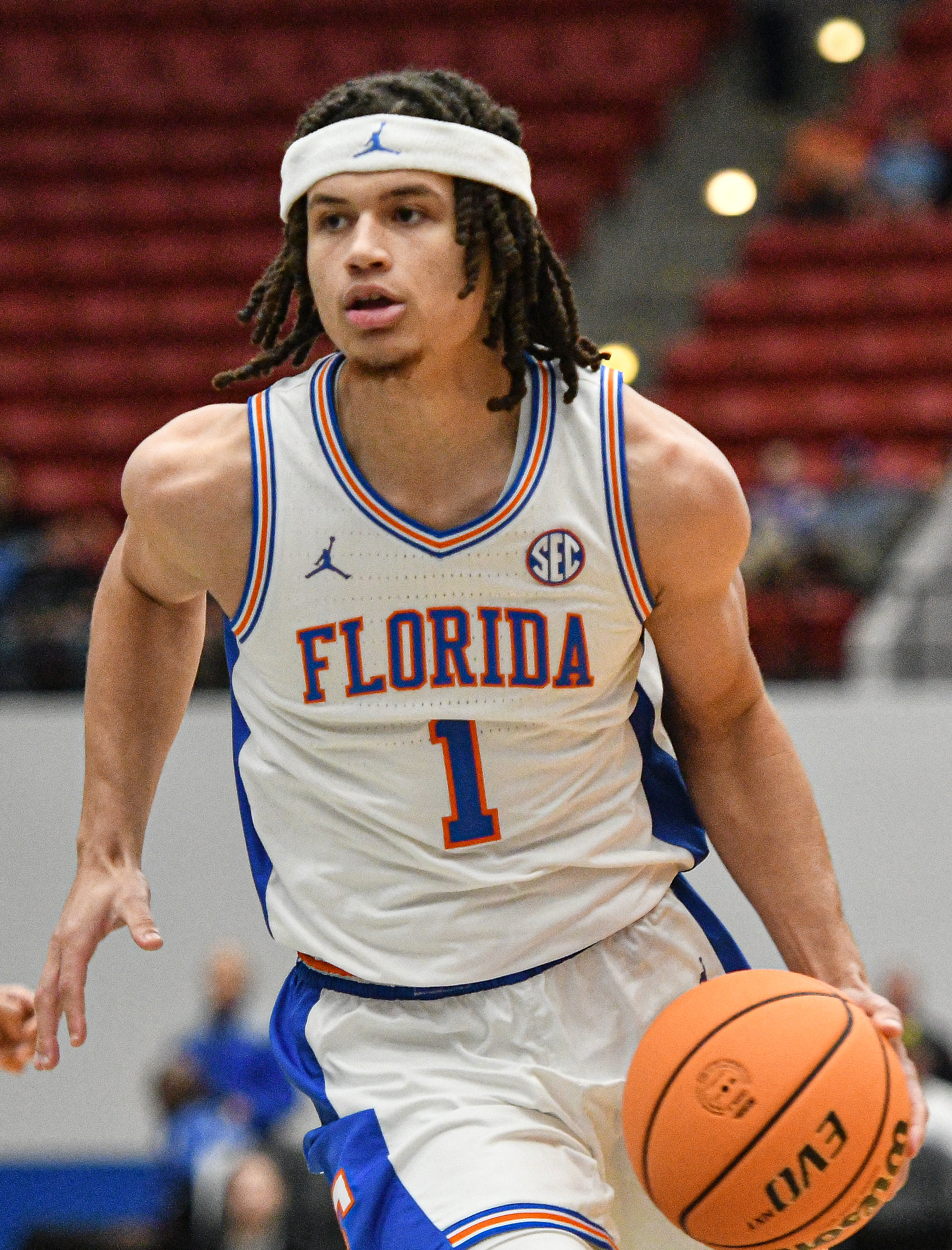
Walter Clayton Jr., Florida, 2025

Year	Player	School	Position	Class	Reference
1939	Jimmy Hull	Ohio State^{#}	F	Senior	
1940	Marv Huffman	Indiana	F	Senior	
1941	John Kotz	Wisconsin	F	Senior	
1942	Howie Dallmar	Stanford	F	Sophomore	
1943	Ken Sailors	Wyoming	PG	Junior	
1944	Arnie Ferrin	Utah	SF / SG	Freshman	
1945	Bob Kurland	Oklahoma State	C	Junior	
1946	Bob Kurland* (2)	Oklahoma State	C	Senior	
1947	George Kaftan	Holy Cross	SF	Sophomore	
1948	Alex Groza	Kentucky	C	Junior	
1949	Alex Groza (2)	Kentucky	C	Senior	
1950	Irwin Dambrot	CCNY	F	Senior	
1951	Bill Spivey (Note: The MOP was not officially awarded after the 1951 championship game. However, the NCAA lists Bill Spivey as the winner of the 1951 MOP in its official record book.)	Kentucky	C	Senior	
1952	Clyde Lovellette*	Kansas	C	Senior	
1953	B. H. Born	Kansas^{#}	C	Junior	
1954	Tom Gola*	La Salle	SF	Junior	
1955	Bill Russell*	San Francisco	C	Junior	
1956	Hal Lear	Temple^{†}	PG	Senior	
1957	Wilt Chamberlain	Kansas^{#}	C	Sophomore	
1958	Elgin Baylor*	Seattle^{#}	SF	Junior	
1959	Jerry West	West Virginia^{#}	PG	Junior	
1960	Jerry Lucas	Ohio State	PF	Sophomore	
1961	Jerry Lucas* (2)	Ohio State^{#}	PF	Junior	
1962	Paul Hogue*	Cincinnati	C	Senior	
1963	Art Heyman*	Duke^{#}	SF / SG	Senior	
1964	Walt Hazzard*	UCLA	PG / SG	Senior	
1965	Bill Bradley*	Princeton^{†}	SF	Senior	
1966	Jerry Chambers	Utah^{‡}	SF	Senior	
1967	Lew Alcindor* (Note: Lew Alcindor later changed his named to Kareem Abdul-Jabbar.)	UCLA	C	Sophomore	
1968	Lew Alcindor* (2)	UCLA	C	Junior	
1969	Lew Alcindor* (3)	UCLA	C	Senior	
1970	Sidney Wicks*	UCLA	PF	Junior	
1971	Howard Porter (Note: Porter scored 25 points in a losing effort but was still named the MOP. However, he was later ruled ineligible for the honor because he had signed a professional contract with the ABA's Pittsburgh Condors during the middle of his senior year. The NCAA vacated both Porter's award and Villanova's entire season.)	Villanova^{#}	PF / SF	Senior	
1972	Bill Walton*	UCLA	C	Sophomore	
1973	Bill Walton* (2)	UCLA	C	Junior	
1974	David Thompson	NC State	SG	Junior	
1975	Richard Washington	UCLA	PF / C	Sophomore	
1976	Kent Benson*	Indiana	C	Junior	
1977	Butch Lee	Marquette	PG	Junior	
1978	Jack Givens*	Kentucky	SG / SF	Senior	
1979	Magic Johnson	Michigan State	PG	Sophomore	
1980	Darrell Griffith*	Louisville	SG	Senior	
1981	Isiah Thomas	Indiana	PG	Sophomore	
1982	James Worthy	North Carolina	SF	Junior	
1983	Akeem Olajuwon*	Houston^{#}	C	Sophomore	
1984	Patrick Ewing	Georgetown	C	Junior	
1985	Ed Pinckney	Villanova	SF / PF	Senior	
1986	Pervis Ellison	Louisville	C	Freshman	
1987	Keith Smart	Indiana	PG	Junior	
1988	Danny Manning*	Kansas	PF	Senior	
1989	Glen Rice	Michigan	SF	Senior	
1990	Anderson Hunt	UNLV	SG	Sophomore	
1991	Christian Laettner	Duke	PF / C	Junior	
1992	Bobby Hurley	Duke	PG	Junior	
1993	Donald Williams	North Carolina	PG / SG	Sophomore	
1994	Corliss Williamson	Arkansas	PF	Sophomore	
1995	Ed O'Bannon*	UCLA	PF	Senior	
1996	Tony Delk	Kentucky	PG / SG	Senior	
1997	Miles Simon	Arizona	SG	Junior	
1998	Jeff Sheppard	Kentucky	PG / SG	Senior	
1999	Richard Hamilton	UConn	SG	Junior	
2000	Mateen Cleaves	Michigan State	PG	Senior	
2001	Shane Battier*	Duke	SF	Senior	
2002	Juan Dixon	Maryland	PG / SG	Senior	
2003	Carmelo Anthony	Syracuse	SF / PF	Freshman	
2004	Emeka Okafor*	UConn	C	Junior	
2005	Sean May	North Carolina	PF	Junior	
2006	Joakim Noah	Florida	C	Sophomore	
2007	Corey Brewer	Florida	SF	Junior	
2008	Mario Chalmers	Kansas	PG	Junior	
2009	Wayne Ellington	North Carolina	SG	Junior	
2010	Kyle Singler	Duke	SF	Junior	
2011	Kemba Walker	UConn	PG	Junior	
2012	Anthony Davis*	Kentucky	C	Freshman	
2013	Luke Hancock (Note: Hancock had his MOP award stripped when the NCAA vacated Louisville's 2013 national championship. His award was restored in 2019 when a lawsuit brought against the NCAA was settled, clearing his name of any wrongdoing in the team scandal.)	Louisville	SF	Junior	
2014	Shabazz Napier	UConn	PG	Senior	
2015	Tyus Jones	Duke	PG	Freshman	
2016	Ryan Arcidiacono	Villanova	PG / SG	Senior	
2017	Joel Berry II	North Carolina	PG	Junior	
2018	Donte DiVincenzo	Villanova	SG	Sophomore	
2019	Kyle Guy	Virginia	SG	Junior	
~~2020~~	Tournament canceled due to the COVID-19 pandemic				
2021	Jared Butler	Baylor	PG	Junior	
2022	Ochai Agbaji	Kansas	SG	Senior	
2023	Adama Sanogo	UConn	PF	Junior	
2024	Tristen Newton	UConn	PG / SG	Senior	
2025	Walter Clayton Jr.	Florida	PG / SG	Senior	
2026	Elliot Cadeau	Michigan	PG	Junior	

== Women's tournament ==
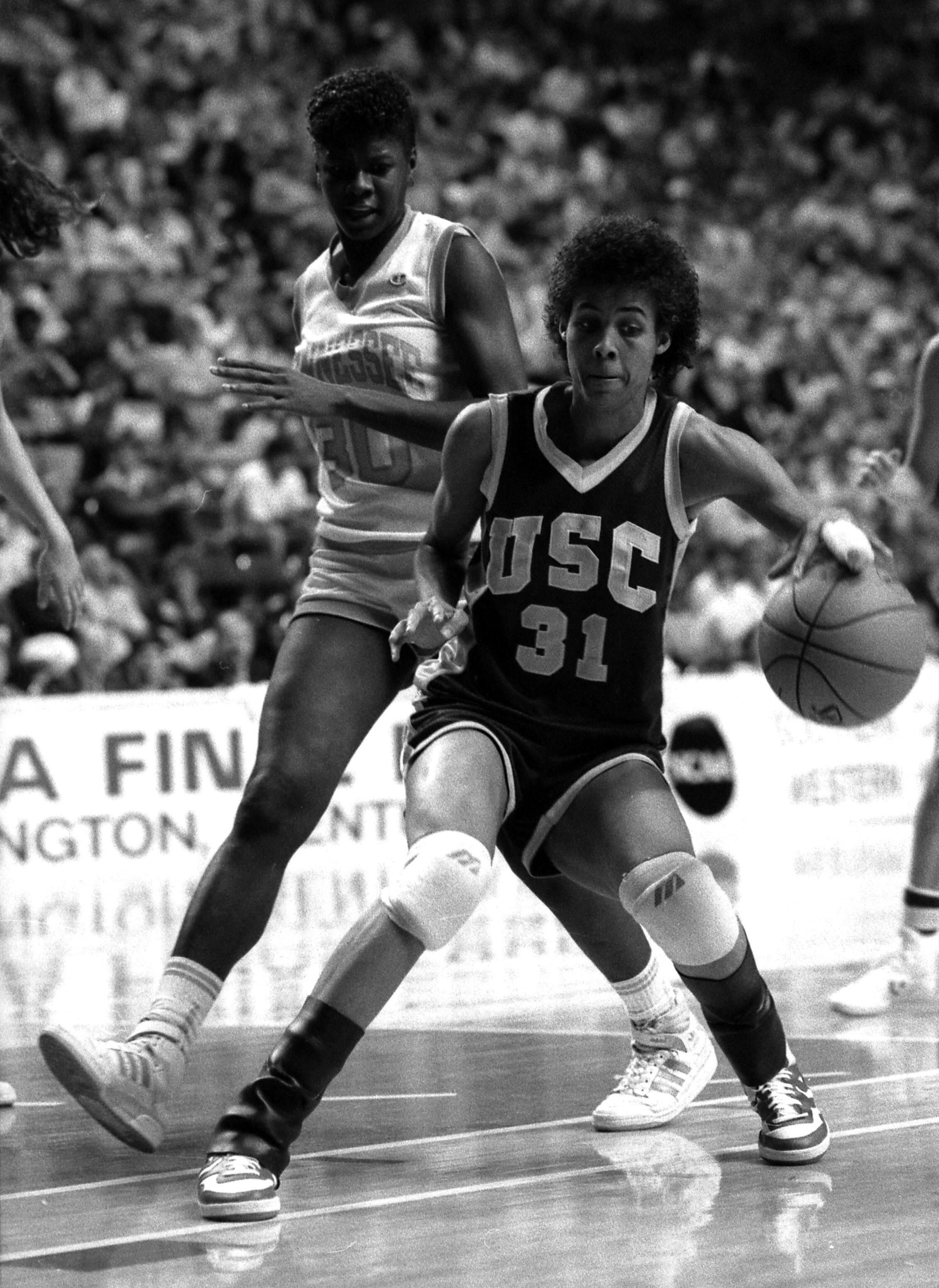
Cheryl Miller, USC, 1983 and 1984

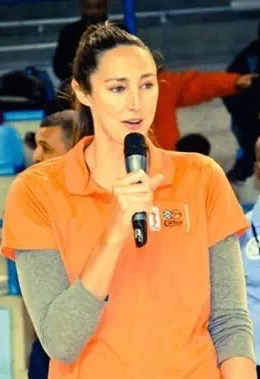
Ruth Riley, Notre Dame, 2001

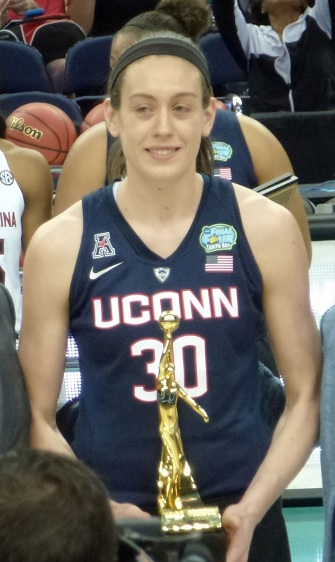
Breanna Stewart, UConn, 2013 through 2016

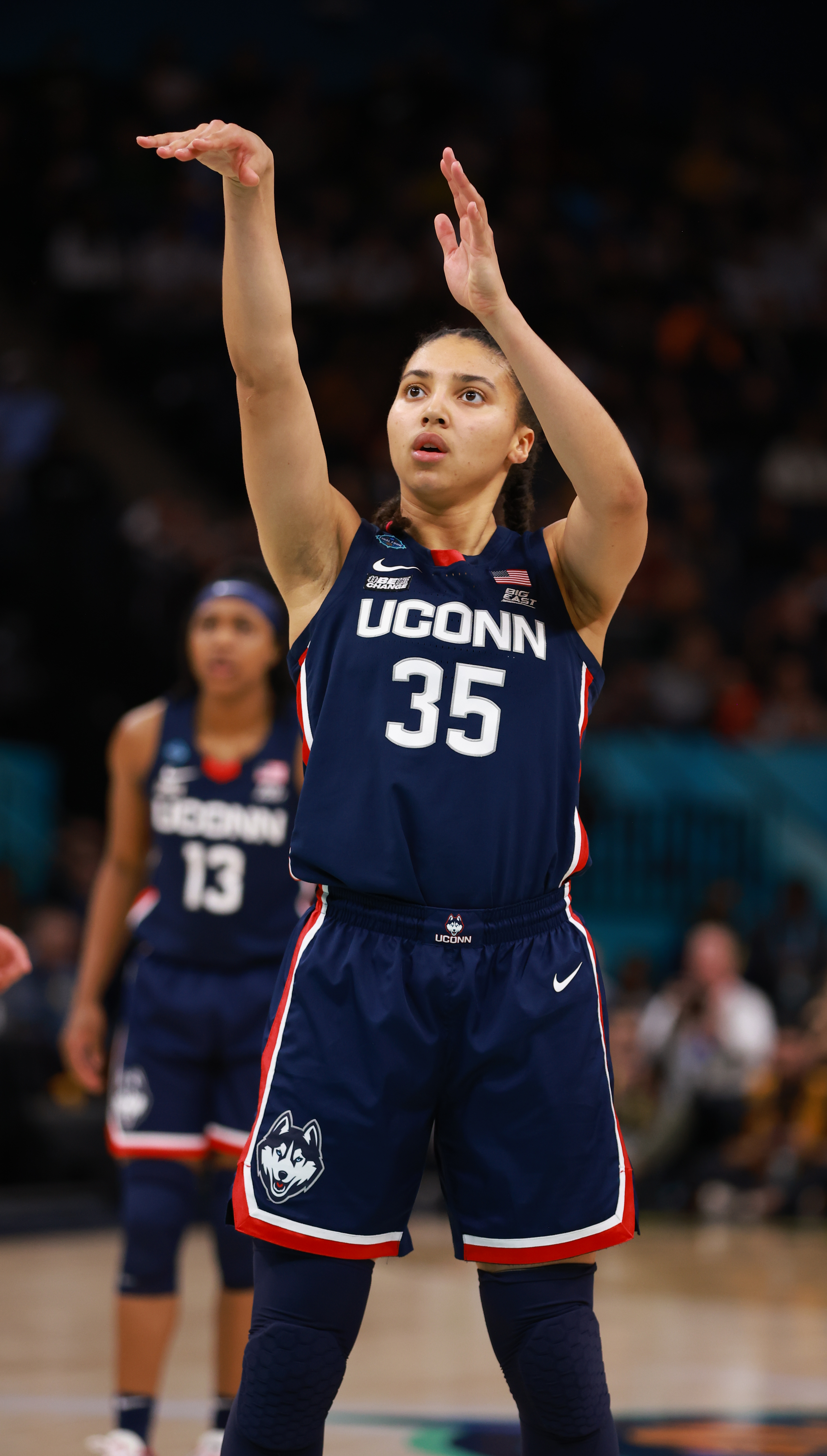
Azzi Fudd, UConn, 2025

Year	Player	School	Position	Class	Reference
1982	Janice Lawrence	Louisiana Tech	F	Sophomore	
1983	Cheryl Miller	USC	SF	Freshman	
1984	Cheryl Miller* (2)	USC	SF	Sophomore	
1985	Tracy Claxton	Old Dominion	F	Senior	
1986	Clarissa Davis	Texas	F	Freshman	
1987	Tonya Edwards	Tennessee	G	Freshman	
1988	Erica Westbrooks	Louisiana Tech	F	Senior	
1989	Bridgette Gordon	Tennessee	F	Senior	
1990	Jennifer Azzi*	Stanford	PG	Senior	
1991	Dawn Staley*	Virginia^{#}	PG	Junior	
1992	Molly Goodenbour	Stanford	G	Junior	
1993	Sheryl Swoopes*	Texas Tech	SG / SF	Senior	
1994	Charlotte Smith	North Carolina	F	Junior	
1995	Rebecca Lobo*	UConn	C	Senior	
1996	Michelle Marciniak	Tennessee	PG	Senior	
1997	Chamique Holdsclaw	Tennessee	SF	Sophomore	
1998	Chamique Holdsclaw* (2)	Tennessee	SF	Junior	
1999	Ukari Figgs	Purdue	G	Senior	
2000	Shea Ralph	UConn	PG	Junior	
2001	Ruth Riley*	Notre Dame	PF / C	Senior	
2002	Swin Cash	UConn	SF	Senior	
2003	Diana Taurasi*	UConn	PG / SG	Junior	
2004	Diana Taurasi* (2)	UConn	PG / SG	Senior	
2005	Sophia Young	Baylor	SF	Junior	
2006	Laura Harper	Maryland	PF / C	Sophomore	
2007	Candace Parker*	Tennessee	PF	Junior	
2008	Candace Parker* (2)	Tennessee	PF	Senior	
2009	Tina Charles	UConn	C	Junior	
2010	Maya Moore*	UConn	PF	Junior	
2011	Danielle Adams	Texas A&M	PF / C	Senior	
2012	Brittney Griner*	Baylor	C	Junior	
2013	Breanna Stewart	UConn	PF	Freshman	
2014	Breanna Stewart* (2)	UConn	PF	Sophomore	
2015	Breanna Stewart* (3)	UConn	PF	Junior	
2016	Breanna Stewart* (4)	UConn	PF	Senior	
2017	A'ja Wilson	South Carolina	C	Junior	
2018	Arike Ogunbowale	Notre Dame	PG	Junior	
2019	Chloe Jackson	Baylor	G	Senior	
~~2020~~	Tournament canceled due to the COVID-19 pandemic				
2021	Haley Jones	Stanford	SG	Sophomore	
2022	Aliyah Boston*	South Carolina	PF / C	Junior	
2023	Angel Reese	LSU	PF	Junior	
2024	Kamilla Cardoso	South Carolina	C	Senior	
2025	Azzi Fudd	UConn	SG	Senior	
2026	Lauren Betts	UCLA	C	Senior	

== See also ==
- Chuck Taylor Most Valuable Player Award – the equivalent award in NAIA men's basketball championships
