= 1984–85 Old Dominion Lady Monarchs basketball team =

1984–85 Old Dominion Lady Monarchs basketball season

1984–85 Old Dominion Lady Monarchs basketball

NCAA tournament National Champions Sun Belt tournament champions Sun Belt regular season champions Wildcat Invitational Champion Optimist Classic Champion Holiday Tournament Champion

National Championship Game, W 70–65 vs. Georgia
- Conference: Sun Belt Conference

Ranking
- AP: No. 5
- Record: 31–3 (6–0 Sun Belt)
- Head coach: Marianne Stanley (8th season)
- Home arena: ODU Fieldhouse; Norfolk Scope (alternate)

1984–85 Sun Belt Conference women's basketball standings
	Conf.				Overall
Team	W		L	PCT	W		L	PCT
No. 5 Old Dominion †	6	–	0	1.000	31	–	3	.912
No. 14 WKU	5	–	1	.833	28	–	6	.824
UAB	4	–	2	.667	14	–	15	.483
South Alabama	3	–	3	.500	19	–	10	.655
UNC Charlotte	2	–	4	.333	13	–	12	.520
VCU	1	–	5	.167	8	–	19	.296
South Florida	0	–	6	.000	8	–	18	.308
† 1985 Sun Belt tournament winner Rankings from AP Poll

The 1984–85 Old Dominion Lady Monarchs basketball team represented Old Dominion University during the 1984–85 NCAA Division I women's basketball season. The Monarchs, led by eighth-year head coach Marianne Stanley, played their home games at the Old Dominion University Fieldhouse, and alternatively at the Norfolk Scope, in Norfolk, Virginia. They were members of the Sun Belt Conference.

== NCAA tournament ==
After finishing the season 26–3 with an undefeated conference record following their conference tournament, the Lady Monarchs were awarded the first seed of the eastern regional bracket and regional home-field advantage for the 1985 NCAA women's basketball tournament. They won their first three playoff games at the ODU Fieldhouse and advanced to the Final Four.

Old Dominion faced Northeast Louisiana (now Louisiana–Monroe) in the national semifinals. The Monarchs won 57–47 and were helped from a 1–3–1 half-court trap that prevented NE Louisiana from scoring for five and a half minutes after taking an early lead in the first half.

The Lady Monarchs were able to defeat the Georgia Lady Bulldogs 70–65, despite making only 38.2 percent of field goal attempts. They brought home the first NCAA basketball championship for Old Dominion University. Center Tracy Claxton was awarded most outstanding player in the championship game.

== Roster ==
1984–85 Old Dominion Lady Monarchs women's basketball team
Players
Coaches

Pos.	#	Name	Height	Year	Hometown
F	3	Dawn Cullen	6 ft 4 in (1.93 m)	Jr	Norfolk, VA
G	11	Marie Christian	—	So
F	13	Medina Dixon	—	Sr	Boston, MA
C	15	Tracy Claxton	—	Sr	New Haven, CT
G	20	Lisa Blais	—	Sr
G	23	Bridget Jenkins	—	So
F	24	Adrienne Goodson	6 ft 0 in (1.83 m)	Fr	Bayonne, NJ
F	25	Donna Harrington	—	So
F	32	Alphelia Jenkins	—
F	33	Liz Connahan	—	Fr
			—	—

Head coach

- Marianne Stanley (Immaculata)

Assistant coach(es)

- Wendy Larry - asst. coach
- Barbara Thaxton - asst. coach
- Beth Calder - manager
- Lisa Hendrick - manager
- Trish Vantucci - manager

Legend

- (C) Team captain
- (S) Suspended
- (I) Ineligible
- (W) Walk-on
- Injured
- Current redshirt

Roster
Last update: December 16, 2023

== Schedule and results ==
Date time, TV	Rank^{#}	Opponent^{#}	Result	Record	Site (attendance) city, state
Regular season
November 24, 1984*	No. 3	No. 2 Texas	W 90–80	1–0	ODU Fieldhouse (3,186); Norfolk, VA
November 28, 1984	No. 2	VCU; Rivalry	W 76–41	2–0 (1–0)	Norfolk Scope (3,480); Norfolk, VA
November 30, 1984*	No. 2	vs. Pittsburgh; Wildcat Invitational	W 98–64	3–0	Welsh–Ryan Arena (75); Evanston, IL
December 1, 1984*	No. 2	vs. Northwestern; Wildcat Invitational	W 87–85	4–0	Welsh–Ryan Arena (206); Evanston, IL
December 4, 1984*	No. 1	No. 10 Virginia	W 80–58	5–0	ODU Fieldhouse (2,317); Norfolk, VA
December 7, 1984*	No. 1	at East Carolina	W 92–74	6–0	Minges Coliseum (350); Greenville, NC
December 15, 1984*	No. 1	James Madison; Rivalry	W 79–43	7–0	Norfolk Scope (4,982); Norfolk, VA
December 21, 1984*	No. 1	Providence; Optimist Classic	W 98–62	8–0	ODU Fieldhouse (715); Norfolk, VA
December 22, 1984*	No. 1	Vanderbilt; Optimist Classic	W 96–72	9–0	ODU Fieldhouse (1,415); Norfolk, VA
December 28, 1984*	No. 1	vs. North Carolina; Holiday Tournament	W 78–64	10–0	Reynolds Coliseum (650); Raleigh, NC
December 29, 1984*	No. 1	vs. No. 13 Kentucky; Holiday Tournament	W 66–59	11–0	Reynolds Coliseum (400); Raleigh, NC
January 4, 1985*	No. 1	UCLA	W 74–58	12–0	ODU Fieldhouse (3,011); Norfolk, VA
January 7, 1985*	No. 1	No. 2 Long Beach State	W 84–71	13–0	ODU Fieldhouse (3,581); Norfolk, VA
January 11, 1985*	No. 1	No. 6 USC	W 52–48	14–0	ODU Fieldhouse (4,628); Norfolk, VA
January 13, 1985*	No. 1	at No. 12 Kentucky	W 64–63	15–0	Memorial Coliseum (5,200); Lexington, KY
January 16, 1985*	No. 1	South Carolina	W 79–72	16–0	ODU Fieldhouse (2,001); Norfolk, VA
January 25, 1985*	No. 1	Tennessee; Donna Doyle Scholarship Game	L 64–67	16–1	ODU Fieldhouse (4,336); Norfolk, VA
January 28, 1985	No. 2	No. 11 Western Kentucky	W 76–57	17–1 (2–0)	ODU Fieldhouse (1,671); Norfolk, VA
January 30, 1985*	No. 2	at Virginia Tech	W 86–76	18–1	Cassell Coliseum (306); Blacksburg, VA
February 1, 1985*	No. 2	NC State	L 64–67	18–2	ODU Fieldhouse (3,912); Norfolk, VA
February 5, 1985	No. 3	South Florida	W 72–45	19–2 (3–0)	ODU Fieldhouse (1,312); Norfolk, VA
February 9, 1985*	No. 3	at Maryland	W 73–60	20–2	Cole Field House (850); College Park, MD
February 13, 1985*	No. 3	at No. 6 Louisiana Tech	L 63–72	20–3	Thomas Assembly Center (5,970); Ruston, LA
February 15, 1985*	No. 3	Boston University	W 84–55	21–3	ODU Fieldhouse (2,200); Norfolk, VA
February 21, 1985	No. 7	at South Alabama	W 64–56	22–3 (4–0)	Jaguar Gym (303); Mobile, AL
February 23, 1985	No. 7	at UAB	W 77–58	23–3 (5–0)	BJCC Coliseum (350); Birmingham, AL
February 28, 1985	No. 7	at UNC Charlotte	W 85–57	24–3 (6–0)	Belk Gymnasium (950); Charlotte, NC
Sun Belt tournament
March 8, 1985	(1) No. 5	(3) UAB; Semifinals	W 95–57	25–3	ODU Fieldhouse (1,395); Norfolk, VA
March 9, 1985	(1) No. 5	(2) No. 14 Western Kentucky; Championship	W 76–63	26–3	ODU Fieldhouse (1,697); Norfolk, VA
NCAA tournament
March 16, 1985*	(1E) No. 5	(8E) Syracuse; First round	W 88–63	27–3	ODU Fieldhouse (1,609); Norfolk, VA
March 21, 1985*	(1E) No. 5	(4E) No. 12 NC State; Regional semifinals	W 77–67	28–3	ODU Fieldhouse (2,812); Norfolk, VA
March 23, 1985*	(1E) No. 5	(2E) No. 7 Ohio State; Regional finals	W 72–68	29–3	ODU Fieldhouse (3,086); Norfolk, VA
March 29, 1985*	(1E) No. 5	vs. (2MW) No. 2 NE Louisiana; National semifinals	W 57–47	30–3	Frank Erwin Center (7,648); Austin, TX
March 31, 1985*	(1E) No. 5	vs. (2W) No. 8 Georgia; National championship	W 70–65	31–3	Frank Erwin Center (7,597); Austin, TX
*Non-conference game. ^{#}Rankings from AP Poll. (#) Tournament seedings in parentheses. All times are in Eastern. E = East, MW = Midwest, W = West

- Source: Old Dominion Athletics, NCAA Statistics

== Rankings ==
Regular season Poll
Poll	Pre- Season	Week 2	Week 3	Week 4	Week 5	Week 6	Week 7	Week 8	Week 9	Week 10	Week 11	Week 12	Week 13	Week 14	Week 15	Week 16	Final
AP	3	2	1	1	1	1	1	1	1	1	2	3	3	7	7	5	5

Legend
	Increase in ranking
	Decrease in ranking
	Not ranked previous week
(RV)	Received Votes

- Source: Division I Women's Basketball Records

== See also ==
- Old Dominion Monarchs women's basketball
- 1984–85 Old Dominion Monarchs basketball team
