= Medina Dixon =

American basketball player (1962–2021)

Personal information
- Born: November 2, 1962 Boston, Massachusetts, U.S.
- Died: November 8, 2021 (aged 59)

Career information
- College: South Carolina (1981–1982); Old Dominion (1982–1985)

Career highlights
- NCAA champion (1985)
Medals
Women's basketball
Representing the United States
Olympic Games
Bronze medal – third place	1992 Barcelona	Team competition
Pan American Games
Bronze medal – third place	1991 Havana	Team competition
FIBA World Championship
Gold medal – first place	1990 Malaysia	Team competition

Medina Dixon (November 2, 1962 – November 8, 2021) was an American basketball player born in Boston, Massachusetts. She was a member of the United States women's national basketball team during the late 1980s and the early 1990s, collecting three medals during her international career. Dixon originally signed and played the 1981–82 season with South Carolina Gamecocks women's basketball. She then transferred to Old Dominion University where she played for three seasons, leading them to a national championship in their 1984–85 season. Her number was retired by the team in 2011. After her college career, she played professionally for overseas teams, including in Japan, where she played for six years, and then in Russia.

== College statistics ==
Legend
GP	Games played	GS	Games started	MPG	Minutes per game
FG%	Field goal percentage	3P%	3-point field goal percentage	FT%	Free throw percentage
RPG	Rebounds per game	APG	Assists per game	SPG	Steals per game
BPG	Blocks per game	PPG	Points per game	**Bold**	Career high

Year	Team	GP	Points	FG%	FT%	RPG	APG	BPG	PPG
1981–82	South Carolina	15	243	44.6%	61.1%	8.3	1.4	**0.7**	16.2
1982–83	Old Dominion	**34**	565	50.4%	67.6%	7.7	4.3	0.6	16.6
1983–84	Old Dominion	29	**602**	**55.1%**	**78.7%**	**10.3**	**4.5**	0.7	**20.8**
1984–85	Old Dominion	**34**	558	48.1%	70.8%	8.5	3.5	0.7	16.4
Career		113	1968	49.4%	71.0%	8.7	3.7	0.7	17.4

== USA Basketball ==
Dixon represented the US at the World Championships held in Kuala Lumpur, Malaysia in July 1990. The team won all eight games, earning the gold medal. Dixon scored 8.3 points per game and had 15 assists, second highest on the team.

Dixon again played with the USA team at the 1991 Pan American Games. The team finished with a record of 4–2, but managed to win the bronze medal. The USA team lost a three-point game to Brazil, then responded with wins over Argentina and Cuba, earning a spot in the medal round. The next game was a rematch against Cuba, and this time the team from Cuba won a five-point game. The USA beat Canada easily to win the bronze. Dixon averaged 7.8 points per game.

At the 1992 Olympic games in Barcelona, Spain, Dixon was the leading scorer of the USA team with 15.8 points per game. Dixon led the team in scoring against China, which set up a medal round game against the Unified Team and fell, 79–73, even though Dixon set a USA team single scoring record with 28 points. The USA team then faced Cuba for the bronze medal. The game was tied at halftime, and Cuba had a small lead midway through the second half, but the USA went on a run to retake the lead, and finished with an 88–74 victory and the bronze medal.

On November 8, 2021, Dixon died from pancreatic cancer.
