= Janet Harris =

American basketball player

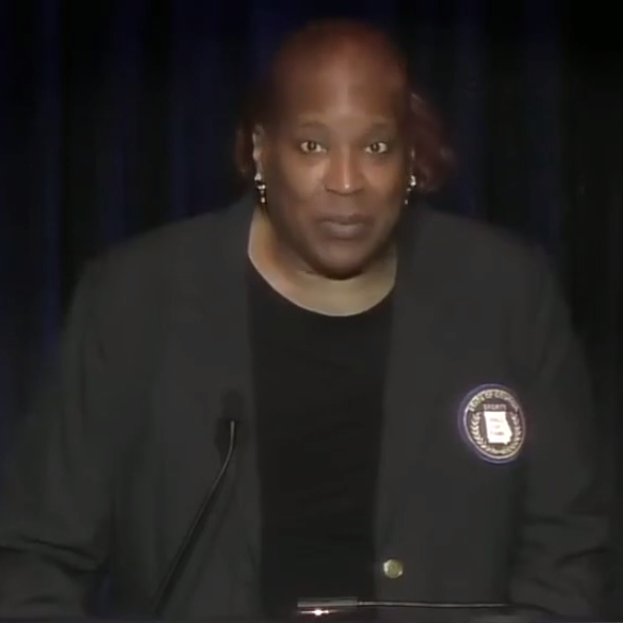
- Harris at the Georgia Sports Hall of Fame in 2021

Personal information
- Born: Chicago, Illinois, U.S.
- Listed height: 6 ft 3 in (1.91 m)

Career information
- High school: John Marshall (Chicago, Illinois)
- College: Georgia (1982–1985)

Career highlights
- 3x Kodak All-American (1982, 1984, 1985); Prep All-American
- Women's Basketball Hall of Fame

Janet Harris is a former women's basketball player for the National Collegiate Athletic Association (NCAA). She is a member of the Women's Basketball Hall of Fame for the class of 2015.

== High school ==
Harris helped lead her Marshall high school team from Chicago to a 31–2 record during her senior year. She was inducted into the Illinois High School Basketball Hall of Fame.

== NCAA ==
Harris played four years at University of Georgia. The team advanced to the Final Four two of those years. During her final season, the Georgia Lady Bulldogs finished as NCAA runners-up.

=== Georgia statistics ===
Legend
GP	Games played	GS	Games started	MPG	Minutes per game
FG%	Field goal percentage	3P%	3-point field goal percentage	FT%	Free throw percentage
RPG	Rebounds per game	APG	Assists per game	SPG	Steals per game
BPG	Blocks per game	PPG	Points per game	**Bold**	Career high

Year	Team	GP	Points	FG%	FT%	RPG	APG	SPG	BPG	PPG
1981–82	Georgia	30	663	.533	.631	**12.4**	1.8	**2.5**	0.4	**22.1**
1982–83	Georgia	**34**	692	.557	.606	11.7	1.2	1.8	**0.6**	20.4
1983–84	Georgia	33	586	.528	.698	8.5	2.1	2.1	0.5	17.8
1984–85	Georgia	**34**	**700**	**.592**	**.707**	10.3	**2.2**	2.2	0.2	20.6
Career		131	2,641	.555	.658	10.7	1.8	2.1	0.4	20.2

== Accomplishments ==
- She was the first women's basketball player in NCAA history to score 2,500 points and collect 1,250 rebounds
- She has scored career totals of 2,641 points and 1,398 rebounds, number 34 and number 18 in NCAA women's basketball history, respectively.
- Harris was inducted into the Women's Basketball Hall of Fame on June 13, 2015.

== See also ==
- List of NCAA Division I women's basketball players with 2,500 points and 1,000 rebounds
