= 1984–85 Western Kentucky Lady Toppers basketball team =

Intercollegiate basketball season

1984–85 Western Kentucky Lady Toppers basketball

NCAA Mideast Regional Champion Colonel Classic Champion

NCAA tournament, Final Four
- Conference: Sun Belt Conference

Ranking
- AP: No. 14
- Record: 28–6 (5–1 SBC)
- Head coach: Paul Sanderford (3rd season)
- Home arena: E. A. Diddle Arena

1984–85 Sun Belt Conference women's basketball standings
	Conf.				Overall
Team	W		L	PCT	W		L	PCT
No. 5 Old Dominion †	6	–	0	1.000	31	–	3	.912
No. 14 WKU	5	–	1	.833	28	–	6	.824
UAB	4	–	2	.667	14	–	15	.483
South Alabama	3	–	3	.500	19	–	10	.655
UNC Charlotte	2	–	4	.333	13	–	12	.520
VCU	1	–	5	.167	8	–	19	.296
South Florida	0	–	6	.000	8	–	18	.308
† 1985 Sun Belt tournament winner Rankings from AP Poll

The 1984–85 WKU Lady Toppers basketball team represented Western Kentucky University during the 1984–85 NCAA Division I women's basketball season. The Lady Toppers were led by head coach Paul Sanderford and WKU all-time leading scorer Lillie Mason. The team finished second in the Sun Belt Conference and received a bid to the 1985 NCAA Division I women's basketball tournament, where they advanced to the Final Four. Mason, Clemette Haskins, and Kami Thomas were named to the All-Conference team and the SBC Tournament team. Mason was selected to the NCAA Final Four team as well as the being selected the NCAA Mideast Region Most Outstanding Player; Haskins joined her on the All-Region team.

== Schedule ==
Date time, TV	Rank^{#}	Opponent^{#}	Result	Record	Site (attendance) city, state
Regular season
11/19/1984*		Evansville; Bowling Green Bank Invitational	W 82–57	1–0	E. A. Diddle Arena; Bowling Green, KY
11/20/1984*		No. 14 Tennessee; Bowling Green Bank Invitational	L 62–70	1–1	E. A. Diddle Arena; Bowling Green, KY
11/28/1984*		Morehead State	W 83–62	2–1	E. A. Diddle Arena; Bowling Green, KY
12/5/1984*		Southern Illinois	W 65–55	3–1	E. A. Diddle Arena; Bowling Green, KY
12/7/1984*		vs. Duquesne; Colonel Classic	W 100–61	4–1	Alumni Coliseum; Richmond, KY
12/8/1984*		at Eastern Kentucky; Colonel Classic	W 70–60	5–1	Alumni Coliseum; Richmond, KY
12/12/1984*		No. 3 Georgia	W 72–67 ^{OT}	6–1	E. A. Diddle Arena; Bowling Green, KY
12/15/1984*	No. 17	at Alabama–Huntsville	W 82–67	7–1	Von Braun Center; Huntsville, AL
12/27/1984*	No. 15	at No. 19 Saint Joseph's (PA); LaSalle Invitational	L 90–93 ^{OT}	7–2	Palestra; Philadelphia, PA
12/28/1984*	No. 15	vs. Cheyney State; LaSalle Invitational	W 58–57	8–2	Palestra; Philadelphia, PA
12/29/1984*	No. 15	vs. SW Louisiana; LaSalle Invitational	W 72–61	9–2	Palestra; Philadelphia, PA
1/2/1985*	No. 17	Eastern Kentucky	W 71–63	10–2	E. A. Diddle Arena; Bowling Green, KY
1/5/1985*	No. 17	Lipscomb	W 102–54	11–2	E. A. Diddle Arena; Bowling Green, KY
1/9/1985*	No. 17	Tennessee Tech	W 79–70	12–2	E. A. Diddle Arena; Bowling Green, KY
1/13/1985	No. 14	South Alabama	W 81–57	13–2 (1–0)	E. A. Diddle Arena; Bowling Green, KY
1/15/1985*	No. 14	Louisville	W 91–66	14–2	E. A. Diddle Arena; Bowling Green, KY
1/19/1985*	No. 14	Vanderbilt	W 85–68	15–2	E. A. Diddle Arena; Bowling Green, KY
1/26/1985	No. 11	at VCU	W 105–70	16–2 (2–0)	Richmond Coliseum; Richmond, VA
1/28/1985	No. 11	No. 2 Old Dominion	L 57–76	16–3 (2–1)	ODU Fieldhouse; Norfolk, VA
2/2/1985*	No. 11	at Dayton	W 86–47	17–3	UD Arena; Dayton, OH
2/4/1985*	No. 11	at Northern Kentucky	W 82–62	18–3	Regents Hall; Highland Heights, KY
2/10/1985	No. 11	UAB	W 91–53	19–3 (3–1)	E. A. Diddle Arena; Bowling Green, KY
2/14/1985*	No. 11	at Stetson	W 104–70	20–3	Edmunds Center; DeLand, FL
2/16/1985	No. 11	at South Florida	W 92–70	21–3 (4–1)	USF Sun Dome; Tampa, FL
2/20/1985*	No. 11	at No. 20 Tennessee	L 72–77	21–4	Stokely Athletic Center; Knoxville, TN
2/24/1985	No. 13	at UNC Charlotte	W 88–67	22–4 (5–1)	Charlotte Coliseum; Charlotte, NC
2/27/1985*	No. 13	Cincinnati	W 122–72	23–4	E. A. Diddle Arena; Bowling Green, KY
Sun Belt tournament
3/7/1985	(2) No. 14	vs. (7) South Florida; First round	W 85–64	24–4	ODU Fieldhouse; Norfolk, VA
3/8/1985	(2) No. 14	vs. (4) South Alabama; Semifinals	W 87–82 ^{OT}	25–4	ODU Fieldhouse; Norfolk, VA
3/9/1985	(2) No. 14	vs. (1) No. 5 Old Dominion; Championship	L 63–76	25–5	ODU Fieldhouse; Norfolk, VA
NCAA tournament
3/17/1985*	(ME4) No. 14	(ME5) Middle Tennessee; Mideast Region First Round	W 77–55	26–5	E. A. Diddle Arena; Bowling Green, KY
3/22/1985*	(ME4) No. 14	(ME1) No. 1 Texas; Sweet Sixteen	W 92–90	27–5	E. A. Diddle Arena; Bowling Green, KY
3/24/1985*	(ME4) No. 14	(ME2) No. 6 Mississippi; Elite Eight	W 72–68	28–5	E. A. Diddle Arena; Bowling Green, KY
3/29/1985*	(ME4) No. 14	vs. (W2) No. 8 Georgia; Final Four	L 78–91	28–6	Frank Erwin Center; Austin, TX
*Non-conference game. ^{#}Rankings from AP Poll. (#) Tournament seedings in parentheses.
