= 1984–85 NCAA Division I women's basketball rankings =

- Season: 1984–85
- NCAA Tournament: 1985
- Preseason No. 1: Georgia
- NCAA Tournament Champions: Old Dominion
NCAA Division I women's basketball rankings


A single human poll represents the 1984–85 NCAA Division I women's basketball rankings, the AP Poll, in addition to various publications' preseason polls.

The AP poll was initially a poll of coaches conducted via telephone, where coaches identified top teams and a list of the Top 20 team was produced. The contributors continued to be coaches until 1994, when the AP took over administration of the poll from Mel Greenberg, and switched to a panel of writers. The AP poll is currently a poll of sportswriters. The AP conducts polls weekly through the end of the regular season and conference play.

== Legend ==
–	Not ranked
(#)	Ranking

== AP Poll ==
Team	15-Nov	26-Nov	2-Dec	9-Dec	16-Dec	24-Dec	30-Dec	6-Jan	13-Jan	20-Jan	27-Jan	3-Feb	10-Feb	17-Feb	24-Feb	3-Mar	10-Mar
Texas	2	3	2	2	2	2	4	3	2	2	1	1	1	1	1	1	1
NE Louisiana	7	7	7	6	5	5	5	4	4	4	6	4	4	2	2	2	2
LB State	4	4	4	4	3	3	3	2	3	3	3	2	2	4	4	3	3
La. Tech	8	8	8	7	7	7	7	7	6	6	4	6	6	5	5	4	4
ODU	3	2	1	1	1	1	1	1	1	1	2	3	3	7	7	5	5
Ole Miss	6	6	6	8	8	8	8	8	7	7	7	5	5	3	3	6	6
Ohio St.	17	15	12	10	9	9	9	9	9	9	8	8	8	8	8	7	7
Georgia	1	1	3	3	6	6	6	5	5	5	5	7	7	6	6	8	8
Penn St.	10	10	13	12	11	10	10	10	10	12	12	10	10	10	9	10	9
Auburn	–	–	–	–	19	16	14	12	11	10	10	9	9	9	11	9	10
Washington	–	–	–	–	–	–	–	19	18	16	14	13	12	13	12	12	11
NC State	19	19	–	–	–	–	–	–	17	–	–	20	15	15	14	13	12
Tennessee	14	12	16	15	–	–	–	–	–	–	–	–	–	T20	18	15	13
WKU	–	–	–	–	17	15	17	16	14	11	11	11	11	11	13	14	14
USC	5	5	5	5	4	4	2	6	8	8	9	12	13	12	10	11	15
UNLV	–	–	–	–	–	–	–	–	–	–	–	–	20	18	17	16	16
St Joseph’s	–	–	–	–	–	–	19	–	–	18	18	17	18	17	16	18	17
UCLA	–	–	–	–	–	–	–	–	–	–	–	–	–	–	–	20	18
Texas Tech	–	–	20	16	14	–	16	17	16	14	13	14	16	–	19	17	19
San Diego	13	11	9	9	12	12	12	14	13	13	16	15	14	14	15	19	20
Alabama	20	20	15	19	20	20	20	18	19	–	–	–	–	–	–	–	–
Idaho	–	–	–	–	–	–	–	–	–	–	–	–	–	T20	–	–	–
Kentucky	–	–	14	14	13	13	13	13	12	15	17	19	19	–	–	–	–
LSU	9	9	11	13	16	–	–	–	–	–	–	–	–	–	–	–	–
Maryland	18	18	–	–	–	–	–	–	–	–	–	–	–	–	–	–	–
Memphis	–	–	–	–	–	19	–	–	–	20	20	18	–	–	–	–	–
Miami (FL)	–	–	–	–	–	–	–	20	20	–	–	–	–	–	–	–	–
Missouri	11	17	19	18	18	18	18	–	–	–	–	–	–	–	–	–	–
Oklahoma	–	–	–	–	–	–	–	–	–	19	19	–	–	–	–	–	–
Rutgers	16	14	17	17	15	14	15	15	–	–	–	–	–	–	–	–	–
Tenn. Tech	–	–	–	20	–	17	–	–	–	–	–	–	–	19	–	–	–
Vanderbilt	12	16	18	–	–	–	–	–	–	–	–	–	–	–	–	–	–
Virginia	15	13	10	11	10	11	11	11	15	17	15	16	17	16	20	–	–
