= Tracy Claxton =

American basketball coach

Biographical details
- Born: 6/10/62; New Haven, CT.

Playing career
- 1981–1982: Kansas
- 1983–1985: Old Dominion

Coaching career (HC unless noted)
- 1989–1990: Quinnipiac (assistant)

Accomplishments and honors

Awards
- NCAA Tournament MOP (1985)

Tracy Claxton (born 1961 or 1962) is a former basketball player who amassed 2,420 career points in 1980 while at Wilbur Cross High School in New Haven, Connecticut. She continued to hold the girls basketball record for Connecticut until 1987. At university, Claxton held the 1981 rebound season record with the Kansas Jayhawks women's basketball team and was with Kansas when they finished third at the 1981 AIAW National Division I Basketball Championship. The following year, Claxton held the rebound season record again while also holding the points season record for 1982. After leaving Kansas to join the Old Dominion Lady Monarchs in 1983, Claxton was named the most outstanding player in the 1985 NCAA Division I championship where the 1984–85 team defeated Georgia 70–65.

After her time at Old Dominion ended, Claxton was in the top five for most career rebounds after she led the season rebounds category in 1984 and 1985. With 1,434 combined rebounds, Claxton was eighteenth in NCAA Division I records for most career rebounds in 2020. As a coach, Claxton was an assistant for Quinnipiac College's women's basketball team from 1989 to 1990 before coaching girls basketball teams from the 2000s to 2020s. Claxton became part of the Connecticut Women's Basketball Hall of Fame in 1988 and the New England Basketball Hall of Fame in 2002. Apart from basketball, Claxton worked at Blue Cross Blue Shield Association from 1988 to 2001.

== Early life and education ==
In the early 1960s, Claxton was born in New Haven, Connecticut. Growing up, Claxton played basketball in middle school before continuing her basketball career at Wilbur Cross High School. From 1978 to 1980, Claxton and Wilbur Cross won the Class L basketball division in Connecticut championships. In 1980, Claxton amassed over 2,000 points and was the first person in Connecticut to reach this career threshold in girls basketball.

That year, Claxton finished her girls basketball career in 1980 when she left Wilbur Cross. During her time there, Claxton had 2,420 points throughout her career. Claxton continued to hold the record for most girls basketball career points in Connecticut until it was broken by Tracy Lis in 1987. After dropping to third in 2003, Claxton's state record remained in the top five in the mid-2010s.

From 1980 to 1982, Claxton was part of the Kansas Jayhawks women's basketball team while at the University of Kansas. At the 1981 AIAW National Division I Basketball Championship, Claxton was part of the Kansas team when they reached the second round. The team finished in third by the end of the 1981 AIAW Championship for Division I schools. During her two seasons with Kansas, Claxton had the rebounds season record in 1981 and 1982 while also holding the 1982 season record in points. With her 61 games, Claxton accumulated 792 rebounds and 1,039 points.

After leaving Kansas to become a student at Old Dominion University, Claxton did not play basketball from 1982 to 1983. From 1983 to 1985, Claxton was a member of the Old Dominion Lady Monarchs basketball team. With the Lady Monarchs, Claxton and her team won the 1985 NCAA Division I women's basketball tournament. After the championship game, Claxton was named the NCAA basketball tournament Most Outstanding Player for 1985.

Following her final season in 1985, Claxton had played in 118 games for Old Dominion. With her statistics at Kansas and Old Dominion, Claxton accumulated 1,999 points and 1,434 rebounds in her career. Claxton was also the Old Dominion season leader for most rebounds in 1984 and 1985. With 1,434 rebounds, Claxton was eighteenth for most career rebounds by an NCAA Division I women's basketball player in 2020. Apart from her college basketball career, Claxton went to Sacred Heart University in the 1990s to study primary education.

== Career ==
=== 1980s to 1990s ===
In 1985, Claxton was a candidate to join the Harlem Globetrotters team. She pulled out of the Globetrotter tryout after an ankle injury. During the 1980s, Claxton chose not to play professional basketball outside of the United States. In specific positions, Claxton turned down an offer to play basketball in Ireland.

In the late 1980s, Claxton worked at a daycare before joining Blue Cross Blue Shield Association in 1988 in their claims department. While at Blue Cross, Claxton started her coaching career from 1989 to 1990 with the women's basketball team at Quinnipiac College as an assistant. For the 1995 Special Olympics World Summer Games, Claxton was chosen to be an assistant basketball commissioner at the Special Olympics. In 1997, Claxton chose the Women's National Basketball Association and American Basketball League as her two options for a playing career.

=== 2000s to 2020s ===
After opting out of the WNBA, Claxton was working at Blue Cross in their products division before she was laid off in 2001. Claxton later worked in parks and recreation before becoming a member of the Liveable City Initiative for New Haven in 2005. Claxton continued to work with LCI during the 2010s and 2020s.

Claxton was coaching girls basketball for Amistad Academy before she left for Hyde in 2009. She continued to coach girls basketball with Hyde until she resigned her coaching position in 2014. With the girls basketball team at Wilbur Cross, Claxton had 12 wins and 25 losses from 2015 to 2017. After resuming her coaching position with Wilbur Cross in 2020, Claxton had an additional 13 wins and 14 losses up to 2022.

== Awards and honors ==
In 1988, Claxton became part of the Connecticut Women's Basketball Hall of Fame. With Old Dominion, Claxton was inducted into their sports hall of fame in 1992. In 1993, the Connecticut Sports Writers' Alliance gave a Gold Key to Claxton for her sports career. At Wilbur Cross, Claxton's jersey had previously been retired before it was stolen. In 1995, a replacement jersey was chosen to be retired for Claxton at the high school.

In 1999, Claxton was named one of the 100 best Connecticut athletes of the 1900s by the Hartford Courant. Claxton also became part of the New England Basketball Hall of Fame in 2002. During the mid-2000s, Old Dominion retired the jersey that was worn by Claxton. In 2020, Claxton was one of the selections for an All-Century Team for girls basketball players by the Connecticut Interscholastic Athletic Conference.

== Personal life ==
In 1994, Claxton had a finger tumor removed. She is not married and has one child.
