= South Alabama Jaguars women's basketball =

South Alabama Jaguars
2025–26 South Alabama Jaguars women's basketball team
- University: University of South Alabama
- Head coach: Yolisha Jackson (2nd season)
- Location: Mobile, Alabama
- Arena: Mitchell Center (capacity: 10,041)
- Conference: Sun Belt
- Nickname: Jaguars
- Colors: Blue, white, and red

NCAA Division I tournament appearances
- 1987

Conference regular-season champions
- 1987, 1989, 1990, 2003, 2004

Uniforms
Home	Away

The South Alabama Jaguars women's basketball team represents the University of South Alabama in NCAA Division I competition. They are a member of the Sun Belt Conference.

== History ==
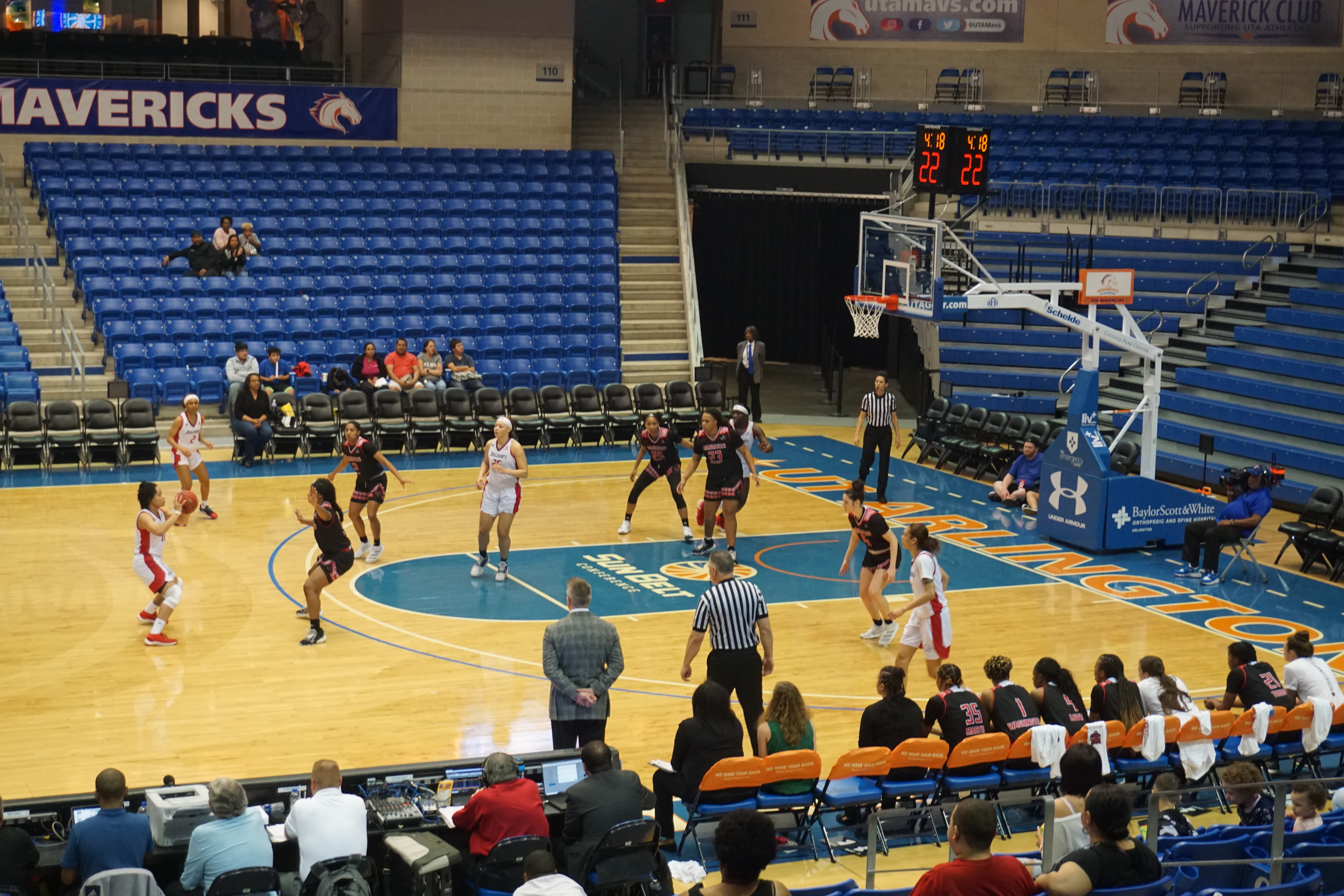
South Alabama in action in the 2020 Sun Belt Conference women's basketball tournament

South Alabama began play in 1974. They have made the NCAA tournament once (1987) and the WNIT four times (1988, 2003, 2004, 2019). They have won the Sun Belt regular season title five times (1987, 1989, 1990, 2003, 2004), but have never won the tournament title. They have finished as runner up in 1984, 1987, 1989, and 2019. As of the end of the 2015–16 season, the Jaguars have an all-time record of 571–610.

== NCAA tournament results ==
Year	Seed	Round	Opponent	Result
1987	#8	First Round	#9 Saint Joseph's	L 56–67
