= 1985 NCAA Division I women's basketball tournament =

American college basketball tournament

- Teams: 32
- Finals site: Frank Erwin Center, Austin, Texas
- Champions: Old Dominion (1st title, 1st title game, 2nd Final Four)
- Runner-up: Georgia (1st title game, 2nd Final Four)
- Semifinalists: Northeast Louisiana (1st Final Four); Western Kentucky (1st Final Four)
- Winning coach: Marianne Stanley (1st title)
- MOP: Tracy Claxton (Old Dominion)

The 1985 NCAA Division I women's basketball tournament began on March 14 and ended on March 31 and featured 32 teams. The Final Four consisted of Old Dominion, Northeast Louisiana, Western Kentucky, and Georgia, with Old Dominion defeating Georgia, 70–65 in the championship game. Old Dominion's Tracy Claxton was named the Most Outstanding Player of the tournament.

1985 is the first year ESPN began televising some of the Tournament games. They televised two of the four Regional finals (East and West Regional), as well as the two national semifinals. The Georgia vs Western Kentucky match up was shown live, while the Old Dominion vs. Northeast Louisiana game was shown tape-delayed. The Championship game was broadcast by CBS.

== Notable events ==
Georgia faced Western Kentucky in the semi-final. This was a rematch of a game played in December, when Western Kentucky prevailed, 72–67. However, in that game, Katrina McClain had been sidelined with an ankle injury. She was available to play in the Final Four, and achieved a career high total of 25 points. Her teammate, Teresa Edwards, scored 27, and the two helped Georgia win the semi-final 91–78.

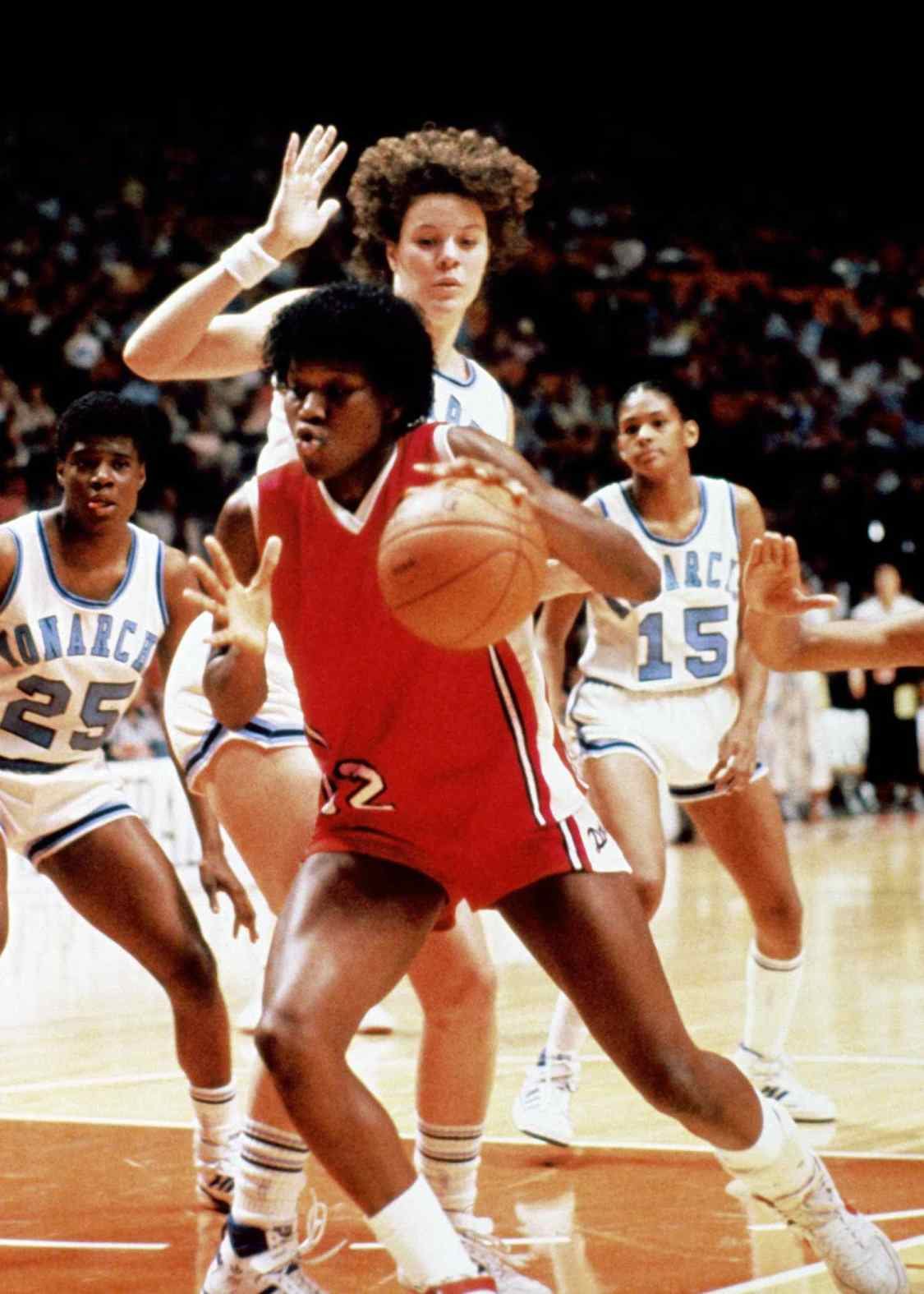
Katrina McClain, Georgia, in championship game

In the championship game, Georgia took on Old Dominion. The Lady Monarchs weren't hitting their shots, scoring on only 38% of their field goal attempts, but they made up for their misses with rebounds. The Old Dominion team had set an NCAA Final Four record (still standing in 2012) with 57 rebounds in the semi-final game, and they repeated that performance in the championship game, pulling down 57 rebounds and limiting Georgia to 30. The game would be close, but Old Dominion prevailed, 70–65, to win the national Championship.

== Records ==
In the second half of the semi-final game between Georgia and Western Kentucky, Georgia scored 57 points while Western Kentucky scored 44. The combined point total of 101 points in a half, as well as the points scored by a single team in a half are both Final Four records, still standing in 2012.

In the other semi-final game, Old Dominion pulled down 57 rebounds against Northeast Louisiana. That number still stands as a Final Four rebounds record, although it was tied two days later by Old Dominion in the championship game against Georgia.

In a first-round game, Teresa Carmichael of Saint Joseph's University, attempted eleven field goals and hit all eleven. That's the most number of field goal attempts without a miss in tournament history, though 2012.

== Qualifying teams – automatic ==
Thirty-two teams were selected to participate in the 1985 NCAA Tournament. Eighteen conferences were eligible for an automatic bid to the 1985 NCAA tournament.

Automatic bids
		Record		
Qualifying School	Conference	Regular Season	Conference	Seed
Pennsylvania State University	Atlantic 10	27–4	7–1	3
North Carolina State University	ACC	24–5	13–1	4
Syracuse University	Big East	18–12	10–6	8
University of Missouri	Big Eight	22–8	12–2	7
Ohio State University	Big Ten	26–2	18–0	2
Brigham Young University	High Country	19–8	11–1	8
University of Memphis	Metro	23–6	9–1	6
College of the Holy Cross	MAAC	21–6	9–3	7
Western Michigan University	MAC	19–9	14–4	8
Illinois State University	Missouri Valley Conference	23–5	17–1	8
University of Idaho	Mountain West	28–1	13–1	5
University of Washington	Northern Pacific	26–1	11–0	3
Middle Tennessee State University	Ohio Valley Conference	23–6	13–1	5
University of Nevada, Las Vegas	Pacific Coast	25–4	8–0	4
University of Tennessee	SEC	21–9	4–4	3
Northeast Louisiana University	Southland	27–1	12–0	2
University of Texas at Austin	Southwest	27–2	16–0	1
Old Dominion University	Sun Belt Conference	26–3	6–0	1
California State University, Long Beach	Western Collegiate	26–2	13–1	1

== Qualifying teams – at-large ==
Fourteen additional teams were selected to complete the thirty-two invitations.

At-large bids
		Record		
Qualifying school	Conference	Regular Season	Conference	Seed
Saint Joseph's University	Atlantic 10	25–4	7–1	5
University of North Carolina at Chapel Hill	ACC	21–10	11–3	6
University of Virginia	ACC	21–7	9–5	6
Louisiana Tech University	Independent	27–3	–	1
University of Southern Mississippi	Metro	21–8	8–2	7
Tennessee Technological University	Ohio Valley Conference	20–8	12–2	7
Auburn University	SEC	24–5	5–3	3
University of Georgia	SEC	25–4	7–1	2
University of Mississippi	SEC	27–2	8–0	2
Western Kentucky University	Sun Belt Conference	26–5	5–1	4
San Diego State University	Western Collegiate	20–8	9–5	5
University of Southern California	Western Collegiate	19–8	10–4	4
University of California, Los Angeles	Western Collegiate	19–9	10–4	6

== Bids by conference ==
Bids	Conference	Teams
4	SEC	Auburn, Georgia, Ole Miss, Tennessee
4	Western Collegiate	Long Beach St., San Diego St., Southern California, UCLA
3	ACC	North Carolina, North Carolina St., Virginia
2	Atlantic 10	Penn St., St. Joseph’s
2	Metro	Memphis, Southern Miss.
2	Ohio Valley	Middle Tenn., Tennessee Tech
2	Sun Belt	Old Dominion, Western Ky.
1	Big East	Syracuse
1	Big Eight	Missouri
1	Big Ten	Ohio St.
1	High Country	BYU
1	Independent	Louisiana Tech
1	Metro Atlantic	Holy Cross
1	Mid-American	Western Mich.
1	Missouri Valley	Illinois St.
1	Mountain West	Idaho
1	Northern Pacific	Washington
1	Pacific Coast	UNLV
1	Southland	Northeast La.
1	Southwest	Texas

== Bids by state ==
The thirty-two teams came from twenty-one states. California and Tennessee had the most teams with four each. Twenty-nine states did not have any teams receiving bids.

NCAA Women's basketball Tournament invitations by state

Bids	State	Teams
4	California	Long Beach St, San Diego St, Southern California, UCLA
4	Tennessee	Memphis, Middle Tenn, Tennessee, Tennessee Tech
2	Louisiana	Northeast La., Louisiana Tech
2	Mississippi	Ole Miss, Southern Miss
2	North Carolina	North Carolina St, North Carolina
2	Pennsylvania	Penn St, St Joseph’s
2	Virginia	Old Dominion, Virginia
1	Alabama	Auburn
1	Georgia	Georgia
1	Idaho	Idaho
1	Illinois	Illinois St
1	Kentucky	Western Ky
1	Massachusetts	Holy Cross
1	Michigan	Western Mich
1	Missouri	Missouri
1	Nevada	UNLV
1	New York	Syracuse
1	Ohio	Ohio St
1	Texas	Texas
1	Utah	BYU
1	Washington	Washington

== Round 1 venues ==
The 32 teams were seeded, and assigned to four geographic regions, with seeds 1-8 in each region. In Round 1, the higher seed was given the opportunity to host the first-round game. In each case, the higher seed accepted the opportunity.

1985 NCAA first round

Region	Host	Venue	City	State
East	Ohio State University	St. John Arena	Columbus	Ohio
East	Old Dominion University	ODU Fieldhouse	Norfolk	Virginia
East	North Carolina State University	Reynolds Coliseum	Raleigh	North Carolina
East	Pennsylvania State University	Rec Hall	University Park	Pennsylvania
Mideast	University of Tennessee	Stokely Athletic Center	Knoxville	Tennessee
Mideast	University of Texas	Frank Erwin Center	Austin	Texas
Mideast	Western Kentucky University	E.A. Diddle Arena	Bowling Green	Kentucky
Mideast	University of Mississippi (Ole Miss)	Tad Smith Coliseum	Oxford	Mississippi
Midwest	Auburn University	Memorial Coliseum	Auburn	Alabama
Midwest	Louisiana Tech University	Thomas Assembly Center	Ruston	Louisiana
Midwest	Northeast Louisiana University	Ewing Coliseum	Monroe	Louisiana
Midwest	University of Nevada, Las Vegas	Thomas and Mack Center	Las Vegas	Nevada
West	University of Georgia	Georgia Coliseum	Athens	Georgia
West	Long Beach State	University Gym	Long Beach	California
West	University of Southern California	Los Angeles Memorial Sports Arena	Los Angeles	California
West	University of Washington	Hec Edmundson Pavilion	Seattle	Washington

== Regionals and Final Four ==
1985 NCAA regionals and Final Four

The regionals, named for the general location, were held from March 21 to March 24 at these sites:

- East Regional Old Dominion University Fieldhouse, Norfolk, Virginia (Host: Old Dominion University)
- Midwest Regional Ewing Coliseum, Monroe, Louisiana (Host: Northeast Louisiana University)
- Mideast Regional E.A. Diddle Arena, Bowling Green, Kentucky (Host: Western Kentucky University)
- West Regional Pauley Pavilion, Los Angeles, California (Host: University of California, Los Angeles)

Each regional winner advanced to the Final Four held March 29 and March 31 in Austin, Texas at the Frank Erwin Center. The University of Texas served as the host institution.

== Brackets ==
=== East regional – Old Dominion – Norfolk, VA (Old Dominion University Fieldhouse) ===
First round March 14–16
1	Old Dominion	88
8	Syracuse	63
4	NC State	67
5	Saint Joseph's	63
3	Penn State	98
6	North Carolina	79
2	Ohio State	102
7	Holy Cross	60

Regional semifinals March 21–22
1	Old Dominion	77
4	N.C. State	67
3	Penn State	78
2	Ohio State	81

Regional finals March 23
1	Old Dominion	72
2	Ohio State	68

=== Midwest regional – Northeast Louisiana University – Monroe, LA (Fant–Ewing Coliseum) ===
First round March 14 – 16
1	Louisiana Tech	81
8	Illinois State	57
4	UNLV	68
5	San Diego State	70
3	Auburn	82
6	Memphis State	64
2	Northeast Louisiana	85 (OT)
7	Missouri	84

Regional semifinals March 21 – 22
1	Louisiana Tech	94
5	San Diego State	64
3	Auburn	71
2	Northeast Louisiana	76

Regional finals March 24
1	Louisiana Tech	76
2	Northeast Louisiana	85

=== Mideast regional – Western Kentucky University, Bowling Green, KY (E. A. Diddle Arena) ===
First round March 14 – 16
1	Texas	84
8	Western Michigan	62
4	Western Kentucky	90
5	Middle Tennessee State	83
3	Tennessee	65
6	Virginia	55
2	Ole Miss	81
7	Southern Mississippi	68

Regional semifinals March 21 – 22
1	Texas	90
4	Western Kentucky	92
3	Tennessee	60
2	Ole Miss	63

Regional finals March 23
4	Western Kentucky	72
2	Ole Miss	68

=== West regional – UCLA, Los Angeles, CA (Pauley Pavilion) ===
First round March 14 – 16
1	Long Beach State	112
8	BYU	85
4	USC	74
5	Idaho	51
3	Washington	62
6	UCLA	78
2	Georgia	91
7	Tennessee Tech	74

Regional semifinals March 21–22
1	Long Beach State	75
4	USC	72
6	UCLA	42
2	Georgia	78

Regional finals March 24
1	Long Beach State	82
2	Georgia	97

=== Final Four – University of Texas – Austin, Texas (Frank Erwin Center) ===
National semifinals March 29
1E	Old Dominion	57
2MW	Northeast Louisiana	47
4ME	Western Kentucky	78
2W	Georgia	91

National championship March 31
1E	Old Dominion	70
2W	Georgia	65

== Record by conference ==
Eleven conferences had more than one bid, or at least one win in NCAA Tournament play:

Conference	# of Bids	Record	Win %	Round of 32	Sweet Sixteen	Elite Eight	Final Four	Championship Game
Southeastern	4	8–4	.667	4	4	2	1	1
Western Collegiate	4	5–4	.556	4	4	1	–	–
Atlantic Coast	3	1–3	.250	1	1	–	–	–
Sun Belt	2	8–1	.889	2	2	2	2	1
Atlantic 10	2	1–2	.333	1	1	–	–	–
Metro	2	0–2	–	–	–	–	–	–
Ohio Valley	2	0–2	–	–	–	–	–	–
Southland	1	3–1	.750	1	1	1	1	–
Big Ten	1	2–1	.667	1	1	1	–	–
Independent	1	2–1	.667	1	1	1	–	–
Southwest	1	1–1	.500	1	1	–	–	–

Nine conferences went 0-1: Big East, Big Eight, High Country, MAAC, MAC, Missouri Valley Conference, Mountain West, Northern Pacific, and Pacific Coast

== All-Tournament team ==
- Tracy Claxton, Old Dominion University
- Medina Dixon, Old Dominion University
- Teresa Edwards, University of Georgia
- Katrina McClain, University of Georgia
- Lillie Mason, Western Kentucky University

== Game officials ==
- Bob Olsen (semifinal)
- John Schleyer (semifinal)
- June Courteau (semifinal, final)
- Bill Stokes (semifinal, final)

== See also ==
- 1985 NCAA Division I men's basketball tournament
- 1985 NCAA Division II women's basketball tournament
- 1985 NCAA Division III women's basketball tournament
- 1985 NAIA women's basketball tournament
