= 1978–79 AIAW Division I women's basketball rankings =

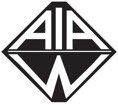
- Season: 1978–79
- AIAW Tournament: 1979
- Preseason No. 1: Tennessee
- AIAW Tournament Champions: Old Dominion
AIAW Division I women's basketball rankings


A single human poll represents the 1978–79 AIAW Division I women's basketball rankings, the AP Poll, in addition to various publications' preseason polls.

he AP poll was initially a poll of coaches conducted via telephone, where coaches identified top teams and a list of the Top 20 team was produced. The contributors continued to be coaches until 1994, when the AP took over administration of the poll from Mel Greenberg, and switched to a panel of writers.

The AP poll is currently a poll of sportswriters. The AP conducts polls weekly through the end of the regular season and conference play.

== Legend ==
–	Not ranked
(#)	Ranking

== AP Poll ==
Team	25-Nov	5-Dec	12-Dec	19-Dec	26-Dec	2-Jan	9-Jan	16-Jan	23-Jan	30-Jan	6-Feb	13-Feb	20-Feb	27-Feb	6-Mar	13-Mar	20-Mar
Old Dominion	6	5	2	1	1	1	1	1	1	1	1	1	1	1	1	1	1
Louisiana Tech	18	17	16	12	12	15	14	8	4	3	3	4	4	4	4	2	2
Tennessee	1	1	1	5	5	5	4	4	7	8	6	6	6	8	8	6	3
Texas	11	10	10	8	8	7	5	5	2	2	2	2	2	3	3	4	4
Stephen F. Austin	8	9	5	2	2	2	2	2	3	4	4	3	3	2	2	5	5
UCLA	3	4	3	3	3	4	10	17	15	14	12	13	13	12	14	12	6
Rutgers	14	15	15	15	15	16	15	16	11	11	10	9	8	7	7	3	7
Maryland	2	2	4	4	4	3	3	3	5	5	7	8	7	6	6	7	8
Cheyney	–	–	T19	19	19	12	12	10	9	9	8	5	5	5	5	8	9
Wayland Baptist	5	6	7	9	9	9	9	6	6	7	9	12	12	13	11	9	10
North Carolina St.	4	3	9	10	10	10	8	7	8	6	5	7	9	9	9	10	11
Valdosta St.	13	13	13	13	13	13	16	13	14	15	16	15	14	16	12	11	12
Penn St.	10	11	11	11	11	11	11	9	12	12	13	11	11	11	10	13	13
Kansas	15	16	–	–	–	–	–	–	19	18	19	17	16	14	17	14	14
South Carolina	–	–	–	–	–	–	–	–	–	–	–	T20	–	18	15	16	15
Northwestern	–	–	–	–	–	–	–	–	–	–	–	T20	19	17	–	18	16
UNLV	–	–	14	14	14	14	13	11	10	10	11	10	10	10	13	17	17
Long Beach St.	–	–	–	–	–	18	17	15	16	16	14	16	18	19	16	15	18
Fordham	–	–	–	–	–	–	–	–	–	–	–	–	–	–	–	–	19
Montclair St.	20	20	17	18	18	20	20	–	–	–	–	–	–	–	19	19	20
Clemson	–	–	–	–	–	–	–	–	20	–	–	–	–	–	–	–	–
Delta St.	9	8	8	7	7	8	7	12	13	13	15	14	15	20	–	–	–
Drake	–	–	–	–	–	–	–	19	–	–	–	–	–	–	–	–	–
LSU	7	7	6	6	6	6	6	14	17	17	18	–	–	–	–	–	–
Memphis	–	–	–	–	–	–	–	20	–	19	20	18	17	15	18	20	–
Missouri	19	19	T19	20	20	19	19	–	–	–	–	–	–	–	–	–	–
Ole Miss	T16	14	18	17	17	17	18	18	18	20	17	19	–	–	–	–	–
Oregon	–	–	–	–	–	–	–	–	–	–	–	–	20	–	20	–	–
Queens (NY)	12	12	12	16	16	–	–	–	–	–	–	–	–	–	–	–	–
Southern Conn. St.	T16	18	–	–	–	–	–	–	–	–	–	–	–	–	–	–	–
