= 2007–08 Stanford Cardinal women's basketball team =

Intercollegiate basketball season

2007–08 Stanford Cardinal women's basketball

Pac-10 Regular season champions Pac-10 Regular tournament champions

NCAA tournament, Final Four
- Conference: Pacific-10 Conference

Ranking
- Coaches: No. 3
- AP: No. 4
- Record: 35–4 (16–2 Pac-10)
- Head coach: Tara VanDerveer
- Assistant coaches: Amy Tucker; Bobbie Kelsey; Kate Paye
- Home arena: Maples Pavilion

2007–08 Pacific-10 Conference women's basketball standings
	Conf.				Overall
Team	W		L	PCT	W		L	PCT
No. 4 Stanford †	16	–	2	.889	35	–	4	.897
No. 10 California	15	–	3	.833	27	–	7	.794
Arizona State	14	–	4	.778	22	–	11	.667
USC	10	–	8	.556	17	–	13	.567
UCLA	10	–	8	.556	16	–	15	.516
Washington	8	–	10	.444	13	–	18	.419
Oregon	7	–	11	.389	14	–	17	.452
Oregon State	4	–	14	.222	12	–	19	.387
Arizona	4	–	14	.222	10	–	20	.333
Washington State	2	–	16	.111	5	–	25	.167
† 2008 Pac-10 Tournament winner Rankings from AP Poll

The 2007–08 Stanford Cardinal women's basketball team represented Stanford University during the 2007–08 NCAA Division I women's basketball season. The Cardinal were coached by Tara VanDerveer and were members of the Pacific-10 Conference.

== Roster ==
2007–08 Stanford Cardinal women's basketball team
Players
Coaches

Pos.	#	Name	Height	Year	Previous school	Hometown
G	0	Melaine Murphy	5 ft 9 in (1.75 m)	So	Midwood	Brooklyn, NY
F/C	2	Jayne Appel	6 ft 4 in (1.93 m)	So	Carondelet	Berkeley, CA
F	5	Michelle Harrison	6 ft 3 in (1.91 m)	So	Mountain View	Orem, UT
G	10	J.J. Hones	5 ft 10 in (1.78 m)	So	Southridge	Beaverton, OR
G	11	Candice Wiggins	5 ft 11 in (1.8 m)	Sr	La Jolla Country Day	La Jolla, CA
G	13	Cissy Pierce	5 ft 10 in (1.78 m)	Sr	Heritage	Littleton, CO
F	14	Kayla Pedersen	6 ft 4 in (1.93 m)	Fr	Red Mountain	Fountain Hills, AZ
G	20	Hannah Donaghe	5 ft 11 in (1.8 m)	Fr	Atascadero	Atascadero, CA
G	21	Rosalyn Gold-Onwude	5 ft 10 in (1.78 m)	So	Archbishop Molloy	New York City, NY
G	23	Jeanette Pohlen	6 ft 0 in (1.83 m)	Fr	Brea Olinda	Brea, CA
F	24	Ashley Cimino	6 ft 3 in (1.91 m)	Fr	Catherine McAuley	Yarmouth, ME
F/C	31	Morgan Clyburn	6 ft 4 in (1.93 m)	Jr	Oak Ridge	The Woodlands, TX
F	33	Jillian Harmon	6 ft 1 in (1.85 m)	Jr	Lakeridge	Lake Oswego, OR

Head coach

- Tara VanDerveer

Assistant coach(es)

- Amy Tucker
- Bobbie Kelsey
- Kate Paye

Legend

- (C) Team captain
- (S) Suspended
- (I) Ineligible
- (W) Walk-on
- Injured
- Current redshirt

Roster

== Schedule ==
Date time, TV	Rank^{#}	Opponent^{#}	Result	Record	Site city, state
Exhibition
Nov 3, 2007*		Chico State	W 95–44	–	Maples Pavilion; Stanford, California
Regular season
Nov 9, 2007*	No. 5	at No. 3 Yale	W 100–44	1–0	Payne Whitney Gymnasium; New Haven, Connecticut
Nov 11, 2007*	No. 5	at No. 3 Rutgers	W 60–58	2–0	Louis Brown Athletic Center; Piscataway, New Jersey
Exhibition
Nov 15, 2007*		USA Basketball	L 62–97	–	Maples Pavilion; Stanford, California
Regular season
Nov 18, 2007*	No. 5	at Utah	W 81–77 ^{2OT}	3–0	Jon M. Huntsman Center; Salt Lake City, Utah
Nov 22, 2007*	No. 4	vs. No. 2 Connecticut; Paradise Jam	L 54–66	3–1	Saint Thomas, U.S. Virgin Islands
Nov 24, 2007*	No. 4	vs. Old Dominion; Paradise Jam	W 69–61	4–1	Saint Thomas, U.S. Virgin Islands
Nov 25, 2007*; 3:00 p.m.	No. 4	vs. Temple; Paradise Jam	W 63–54	5–1	Saint Thomas, U.S. Virgin Islands
Nov 28, 2007*; 10:00 p.m.	No. 6	San Francisco	W 96–61	6–1	Maples Pavilion; Stanford, California
Dec 2, 2007*	No. 6	UC Davis	W 62–41	7–1	Maples Pavilion; Stanford, California
Dec 16, 2007*; 2:00 p.m.	No. 5	No. 10 Baylor	W 87–63	8–1	Maples Pavilion; Stanford, California
Dec 18, 2007*	No. 5	at New Mexico	W 73–54	9–1	The Pit; Albuquerque, New Mexico
Dec 22, 2007*	No. 5	No. 1 Tennessee	W 73–69 ^{OT}	10–1	Maples Pavilion; Stanford, California
Dec 28, 2007; 7:00 p.m.	No. 2	Washington State	W 105–47	11–1 (1–0)	Maples Pavilion (2,530); Stanford, California
Dec 30, 2007; 2:00 p.m.	No. 2	Washington	W 77–42	12–1 (2–0)	Maples Pavilion (3,803); Stanford, California
Jan 4, 2008	No. 2	at UCLA	L 56–69	12–2 (2–1)	Pauley Pavilion; Los Angeles, California
Jan 6, 2008	No. 2	at USC	L 72–73	12–3 (2–2)	Galen Center; Los Angeles, California
Jan 10, 2008	No. 7	Oregon State	W 81–45	13–3 (3–2)	Maples Pavilion; Stanford, California
Jan 12, 2008	No. 7	Oregon	W 83–49	14–3 (4–2)	Maples Pavilion; Stanford, California
Jan 17, 2008	No. 7	at Arizona	W 89–64	15–3 (5–2)	McKale Center; Tucson, Arizona
Jan 20, 2008	No. 7	at Arizona State	W 60–56	16–3 (6–2)	Desert Financial Arena; Tempe, Arizona
Jan 26, 2008	No. 7	No. 8 California	W 72–52	17–3 (7–2)	Maples Pavilion; Stanford, California
Jan 31, 2008	No. 7	USC	W 77–51	18–3 (8–2)	Maples Pavilion; Stanford, California
Feb 2, 2008	No. 7	UCLA	W 75–62	19–3 (9–2)	Maples Pavilion; Stanford, California
Feb 5, 2008*	No. 6	at Santa Clara	W 96–74	20–3	Leavey Center; Santa Clara, California
Feb 7, 2008	No. 6	at Oregon	W 72–43	21–3 (10–2)	McArthur Court; Eugene, Oregon
Feb 9, 2008	No. 6	at Oregon State	W 69–59	22–3 (11–2)	Gill Coliseum; Corvallis, Oregon
Feb 14, 2008	No. 6	Arizona	W 69–46	23–3 (12–2)	Maples Pavilion; Stanford, California
Feb 14, 2008	No. 6	Arizona State	W 79–57	24–3 (13–2)	Maples Pavilion; Stanford, California
Feb 23, 2008	No. 4	at No. 8 California	W 60–58	25–3 (14–2)	Haas Pavilion; Berkeley, California
Feb 29, 2008; 7:00 p.m.	No. 4	at Washington	W 73–53	26–3 (15–2)	Bank of America Arena (3,449); Seattle, Washington
Mar 2, 2008; 12:00 p.m.	No. 4	at Washington State	W 74–52	27–3 (16–2)	Beasley Coliseum (675); Pullman, Washington
Pac-10 tournament
Mar 8, 2008*	(1) No. 4	vs. (8) Oregon State; Quarterfinals	W 64–41	28–3	HP Pavilion; San Jose, California
Mar 9, 2008*	(1) No. 4	vs. (5) UCLA; Semifinals	W 78–45	29–3	HP Pavilion; San Jose, California
Mar 10, 2008*	(1) No. 4	vs. (2) No. 8 California; Championship game	W 56–35	30–3	HP Pavilion; San Jose, California
NCAA tournament
Mar 22, 2008*	(2 SPO) No. 4	vs. (15 SPO) Cleveland State; First round	W 85–47	31–3	Maples Pavilion; Stanford, California
Mar 24, 2008*	(2 SPO) No. 4	(7 SPO) No. 23 UTEP; Second round	W 88–54	32–3	Maples Pavilion; Stanford, California
Mar 29, 2008*	(2 SPO) No. 4	vs. (6 SPO) Pittsburgh; Regional Semifinal – Sweet Sixteen	W 72–53	33–3	Spokane Veterans Memorial Arena; Spokane, Washington
Mar 31, 2008*	(2 SPO) No. 4	vs. (1 SPO) No. 5 Maryland; Regional Final – Elite Eight	W 98–87	34–3	Spokane Veterans Memorial Arena; Spokane, Washington
Apr 6, 2008*	(2 SPO) No. 4	vs. (1 GBO) No. 1 Connecticut; National Semifinal – Final Four	W 82–73	35–3	St. Pete Times Forum; St. Petersburg, Florida
Apr 8, 2008*	(2 SPO) No. 4	vs. (1 OKC) No. 3 Tennessee; National Championship	L 48–64	35–4	St. Pete Times Forum; St. Petersburg, Florida
*Non-conference game. ^{#}Rankings from AP Poll. (#) Tournament seedings in parentheses. SPO=Spokane. All times are in Pacific Time.

== Rankings ==
Ranking movements Legend: ██ Increase in ranking ██ Decrease in ranking
	Week																				
Poll	Pre	1	2	3	4	5	6	7	8	9	10	11	12	13	14	15	16	17	18	19	Final
AP	7	5	4	6	6	5	5	2	2	7	7	7	7	6	6	7	7	6	4		Not released
Coaches	8	5	4	5	5	4	4	2	2	7	6	7	7	6	6	7	7	6	4	4	2

== Awards and honors ==
- Candice Wiggins – Pac-12 Player of the Year
