= Wendy Larry =

American basketball coach (born 1955)

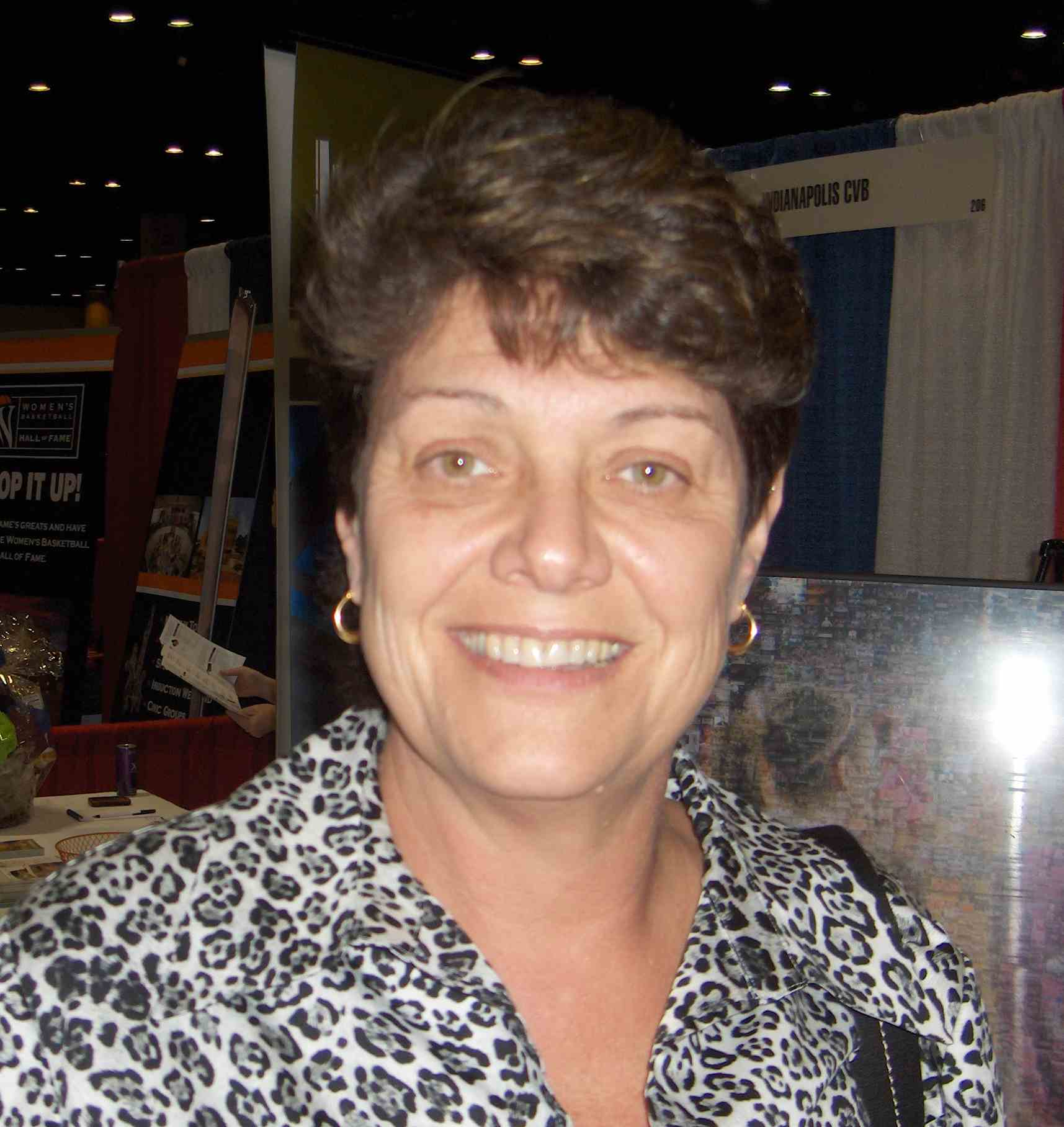
- Larry in 2010

Biographical details
- Born: March 25, 1955 (age 71); Bloomingdale, New Jersey, U.S.

Coaching career (HC unless noted)
- 1978–1979: Virginia Wesleyan
- 1985–1987: Arizona
- 1987–2011: Old Dominion

Head coaching record
- Overall: 608–234 (.722)

Accomplishments and honors

Championships
- NCAA Regional—Final Four (1997); 17× CAA tournament (1992–2008); 16× CAA regular season (1993–2004, 2006–2008, 2010); Sun Belt tournament (1990); Sun Belt regular season (1988–1990)

Awards
- 6× CAA Coach of the Year (1993, 1995–1997, 1999, 2001) Sporting News National Coach of the Year (1997); RCA National Coach of the Year (1997); U.S. Basketball Writers Association Coach of the Year (1997); Sun Belt Coach of the Year (1988) PAC West Coach of the Year (1986)

Wendy Larry (born March 25, 1955) is an American former head coach. She coached three basketball programs, most notably the Old Dominion Lady Monarchs basketball team.

== Early life ==
Born in Bloomingdale, New Jersey, Larry graduated from Butler High School and was recognized as the commencement speaker at the school's 100th graduation ceremonies in 2006.

== Coaching career ==
She became a head coach for the Virginia Wesleyan Marlins for Division II for the 1978-79 season. She became a graduate and assistant coach under Marianne Stanley from 1979 to 1985 at Old Dominion. Her Lady Monarchs teams would reach twenty NCAA Tournaments, set an NCAA record with 17 Colonial Athletic Association (CAA) titles, and Larry coached in 608 career victories. She coached the team in the 1997 NCAA National Championship game against the Lady Vols of the University of Tennessee in Cincinnati, Ohio.

Larry was awarded the US Basketball Writers Association (USBWA) Coach of the Year award in 1997.

In May 2011, Larry announced her retirement from Old Dominion, after her team did not reach the NCAA tournament in two successive seasons. The university did not offer to extend her contract, which had one year remaining.

In June 2012, Larry accepted a position as an associate commissioner of the Atlantic 10 Conference, focusing her work on women's basketball.

== Head coaching record ==
Record table
Season	Team	Overall	Conference	Standing	Postseason
Virginia Wesleyan Marlins (Virginia Association of Intercollegiate Athletics for Women) (1978–1979)
1978–79	Virginia Wesleyan	19–4			
Virginia Wesleyan:		19–4 (.826)			
Arizona Wildcats (Pacific West Conference / Pac-10 Conference) (1985–1987)
1985–86	Arizona	19–9	4–4	T-2nd	
1986–87	Arizona	11–18	4–14	T-6th	
Arizona:		30–27 (.526)	8–18 (.308)		
Old Dominion Monarchs (Sun Belt Conference) (1987–1991)
1987–88	Old Dominion	17–12	6–0	1st	NCAA second round
1988–89	Old Dominion	23–9	5–1	1st	NCAA second round
1989–90	Old Dominion	21–10	5–1	1st	NCAA second round
1990–91	Old Dominion	5–21	2–4	5th	
Old Dominion Monarchs (Colonial Athletic Association) (1991–2011)
1991–92	Old Dominion	20–11	9–5	3rd	NCAA first round
1992–93	Old Dominion	22–8	14–0	1st	NCAA second round
1993–94	Old Dominion	25–6	14–0	1st	NCAA second round
1994–95	Old Dominion	27–6	13–1	T–1st	NCAA first round
1995–96	Old Dominion	29–3	16–0	1st	NCAA Sweet Sixteen
1996–97	Old Dominion	34–2	16–0	1st	NCAA Runner-up
1997–98	Old Dominion	29–3	16–0	1st	NCAA Sweet Sixteen
1998–99	Old Dominion	28–4	16–0	1st	NCAA Sweet Sixteen
1999–00	Old Dominion	29–5	16–0	1st	NCAA Sweet Sixteen
2000–01	Old Dominion	21–9	15–1	1st	NCAA first round
2001–02	Old Dominion	28–6	18–0	1st	NCAA Elite Eight
2002–03	Old Dominion	21–11	15–3	T–1st	NCAA first round
2003–04	Old Dominion	25–7	17–1	1st	NCAA first round
2004–05	Old Dominion	22–9	15–3	2nd	NCAA first round
2005–06	Old Dominion	22–9	17–1	1st	NCAA first round
2006–07	Old Dominion	24–9	17–1	1st	NCAA first round
2007–08	Old Dominion	31–5	17–1	1st	NCAA Sweet Sixteen
2008–09	Old Dominion	17–13	11–7	4th	
2009–10	Old Dominion	19–14	14–4	1st	WNIT second round
2010–11	Old Dominion	20–11	14–4	T–2nd	WNIT first round
Old Dominion:		559–203 (.734)	318–38 (.893)		
Total:		608–234 (.722)			
National champion Postseason invitational champion Conference regular season champion Conference regular season and conference tournament champion Division regular season champion Division regular season and conference tournament champion Conference tournament champion

== See also ==
- List of college women's basketball career coaching wins leaders
