= 1996–97 NCAA Division I women's basketball rankings =

- Season: 1996–97
- NCAA Tournament: 1997
- Preseason No. 1: Stanford
- NCAA Tournament Champions: Tennessee
NCAA Division I women's basketball rankings


Two human polls comprise the 1996–97 NCAA Division I women's basketball rankings, the AP Poll and the Coaches Poll, in addition to various publications' preseason polls. The AP poll is currently a poll of sportswriters, while the USA Today Coaches' Poll is a poll of college coaches. The AP conducts polls weekly through the end of the regular season and conference play, while the Coaches poll conducts a final, post-NCAA tournament poll as well.

== Legend ==
–	No votes
(#)	Ranking

== AP Poll ==
Team	12-Nov	18-Nov	25-Nov	2-Dec	9-Dec	16-Dec	23-Dec	30-Dec	6-Jan	13-Jan	20-Jan	27-Jan	3-Feb	10-Feb	17-Feb	24-Feb	3-Mar	10-Mar
UConn	5	5	3	2	2	2	1	1	1	1	1	1	1	1	1	1	1	1
Old Dominion	7	9	8	6	6	4	2	2	2	2	2	2	2	2	2	2	2	2
Stanford	1	1	1	1	1	1	3	3	3	3	3	3	3	3	3	3	3	3
Georgia	3	2	2	5	4	3	4	5	5	4	5	7	6	6	5	4	7	6
North Carolina	23	22	22	22	20	19	20	19	16	10	9	6	5	5	4	5	4	4
Louisiana Tech	14	11	6	3	3	5	5	4	4	6	6	4	4	4	7	6	5	5
Alabama	2	4	4	8	7	7	7	6	6	5	4	5	7	7	6	7	8	8
Tennessee	4	3	5	4	5	6	6	8	9	9	8	9	9	8	8	8	11	10
LSU	–	–	–	–	–	–	–	–	22	17	18	T14	11	13	13	9	10	9
Florida	21	20	19	24	–	–	–	–	25	24	T19	13	13	10	10	10	6	7
Kansas	12	15	17	18	18	17	19	18	15	11	15	12	12	14	12	11	9	11
Texas	19	21	21	19	16	13	12	14	12	16	12	10	8	11	9	12	12	14
Virginia	10	7	14	12	14	12	10	9	13	8	7	8	10	9	11	13	14	12
Notre Dame	20	14	9	7	10	16	18	17	21	21	T19	19	15	17	16	14	13	15
Texas Tech	11	13	11	10	8	11	11	10	7	14	14	11	14	16	14	15	15	17
Stephen F. Austin	24	24	T24	25	24	24	23	23	23	23	22	20	21	19	18	16	17	19
Vanderbilt	9	6	7	13	15	14	14	11	8	7	11	T14	16	12	15	17	20	20
Illinois	–	–	–	–	–	–	–	–	–	–	–	25	18	15	17	18	16	16
George Washington	–	–	–	–	–	–	–	–	–	–	–	–	–	24	23	19	18	22
Michigan St.	–	–	–	–	–	–	–	–	–	–	–	23	24	20	19	20	23	24
Clemson	–	25	T24	20	22	22	21	21	20	12	10	17	19	22	21	22	21	21
Arkansas	18	19	20	21	23	23	22	13	10	13	13	18	17	21	20	23	–	–
Western Ky.	8	12	12	14	11	10	9	15	19	18	23	24	22	–	25	21	22	25
Duke	16	17	16	15	17	15	13	16	14	19	24	22	20	18	22	25	25	–
Wisconsin	22	23	23	23	19	18	16	20	17	20	16	16	23	–	–	–	–	–
North Carolina St.	13	8	13	11	9	8	8	7	11	15	17	21	25	–	–	–	–	–
Auburn	25	–	–	–	25	20	17	12	18	22	21	–	–	–	–	–	19	13
Colorado	17	18	18	17	21	–	–	–	–	–	–	–	–	–	–	–	–	18
Penn St.	15	16	15	16	T12	9	15	22	–	–	–	–	–	–	–	–	–	–
DePaul	–	–	–	–	–	25	24	24	25	25	–	–	–	–	–	–	–	–
Iowa	6	10	10	9	T12	21	–	–	–	–	–	–	–	–	–	–	–	–
Nebraska	–	–	–	–	–	–	25	25	–	–	–	–	–	23	–	–	–	–
Tulane	–	–	–	–	–	–	–	–	–	–	–	–	–	25	24	–	24	23
Purdue	–	–	–	–	–	–	–	–	–	–	–	–	–	–	–	24	–	–

== USA Today Coaches poll ==
Team	PS	19-Nov	26-Nov	3-Dec	10-Dec	17-Dec	24-Dec	31-Dec	7-Jan	14-Jan	21-Jan	28-Jan	4-Feb	11-Feb	18-Feb	25-Feb	4-Mar	11-Mar	1-Apr
Tennessee	4	2	5	4	5	6	6	8	9	9	9	9	9	9	8	11	11	11	1
Old Dominion	7	9	8	6	6	5	4	4	4	3	3	3	3	3	3	3	3	3	2
Stanford	1	1	1	1	1	1	2	2	2	2	2	2	2	2	2	2	2	2	3
UConn	5	4	3	2	2	2	1	1	1	1	1	1	1	1	1	1	1	1	4
Notre Dame	25	17	12	14	17	19	21	22	24	24	22	22	21	18	17	15	T15	14	5
Florida	21	22	22	–	–	–	–	–	–	–	–	18	15	12	12	13	9	8	6
Georgia	3	3	2	5	4	4	3	5	5	4	5	6	5	5	4	4	6	6	7
Louisiana Tech	11	8	4	3	3	3	5	3	3	6	6	4	4	4	7	5	4	4	8
North Carolina	–	–	–	25	22	20	19	18	15	10	8	8	6	6	5	6	5	5	9
George Washington	–	–	–	–	–	–	–	–	–	–	–	–	–	23	18	18	17	16	10
Alabama	2	5	6	8	9	8	7	6	6	5	4	5	7	7	6	7	8	7	11
LSU	–	–	–	–	–	–	–	–	–	23	23	17	12	13	T13	9	10	10	12
Illinois	–	–	–	–	–	–	–	–	–	–	–	–	25	20	21	20	18	19	13
Virginia	9	7	14	11	11	11	11	T10	13	8	7	7	8	8	9	10	12	12	14
Colorado	15	15	13	15	20	25	–	–	–	–	–	–	–	–	–	–	–	21	15
Kansas	13	16	18	19	19	18	20	21	20	15	15	13	11	14	11	8	7	9	16
Vanderbilt	8	6	7	13	15	15	17	12	8	7	11	14	14	10	T13	17	19	20	17
Texas	20	21	20	20	18	16	16	16	12	16	14	12	10	11	10	12	13	13	18
Texas Tech	12	11	9	7	7	10	9	9	7	12	13	11	13	15	15	16	T15	18	19
Auburn	22	23	23	23	21	17	14	T10	18	21	19	–	–	–	–	–	20	15	20
Michigan St.	–	–	–	–	–	–	–	–	–	–	24	24	24	19	20	19	22	24	21
Stephen F. Austin	24	25	24	24	24	23	22	23	22	20	18	16	17	16	16	14	14	17	22
Purdue	–	–	–	–	–	–	–	–	–	–	–	–	–	–	–	24	–	–	23
Tulane	–	–	–	–	–	–	–	–	–	–	–	–	–	–	24	–	–	23	24
Clemson	23	24	25	21	23	22	18	15	16	11	10	15	18	21	22	25	21	22	25
Arkansas	17	19	21	22	25	–	24	20	17	19	16	19	19	24	23	23	–	–	–
DePaul	–	–	–	–	–	24	23	24	25	–	–	–	–	–	–	–	–	–	–
Duke	18	18	17	16	16	14	13	17	14	18	20	21	20	17	19	22	T24	–	–
Iowa	6	10	10	10	12	21	–	–	–	–	–	–	–	–	–	–	–	–	–
Nebraska	–	–	–	–	–	–	25	25	–	–	–	–	–	–	–	–	–	–	–
North Carolina St.	16	12	16	12	10	9	8	7	10	13	17	20	23	25	–	–	–	–	–
Penn St.	14	14	11	9	8	7	15	19	21	25	–	–	–	–	–	–	–	–	–
Portland	–	–	–	–	–	–	–	–	–	–	–	–	–	–	25	21	23	25	–
San Francisco	–	–	–	–	–	–	–	–	23	22	25	25	–	–	–	–	T24	–	–
Western Ky.	10	13	15	17	14	12	10	14	19	17	21	23	22	–	–	–	–	–	–
Wisconsin	19	20	19	18	13	13	12	13	11	14	12	10	16	22	–	–	–	–	–
