= List of NCAA Division I women's basketball tournament Final Four appearances by coach =

This is a list of the NCAA Division I women's basketball tournament regional championships by coach. Unlike the men's tournament that uses directions for names, the current names of the NCAA tournament regions are the name of the city that is to host said region. The winners of the four regions are awarded an NCAA Regional Championship Trophy and advance in the Division I women's basketball tournament to play in the Final Four.

== Final Four appearances by coach ==
- Coaches with vacated Final Four appearances due to NCAA violations are marked with an * next to the year. The listed Final Four totals for those coaches do not include the vacated appearances.
- Coaches with names in **bold** are active with a team that they took to a Final Four.
- Coaches with names in **bold italics** are active in NCAA Division I, but are not currently coaching a team that they took to a Final Four.
- Years in **bold** indicate national championship.
- All school names reflect current athletic brand names, which do not necessarily match those in use during a particular season.

Number	Coach	Years	Team(s)	Refs
25	**Geno Auriemma**	1991, **1995**, 1996, **2000**, 2001, **2002, 2003, 2004**, 2008, **2009, 2010**, 2011, 2012, **2013, 2014, 2015, 2016**, 2017, 2018, 2019, 2021, 2022, 2024, **2025**, 2026	Connecticut	
18	Pat Summitt	1982, 1984, 1986, **1987**, 1988, **1989**, **1991**, 1995, **1996, 1997, 1998**, 2000, 2002, 2003, 2004, 2005, **2007, 2008**	Tennessee	
14 (Note: In 1996, Stanford head coach Tara VanDerveer stepped away from the team to coach the U.S. women's national team to a gold medal at the 1996 Olympic Games. Marianne Stanley and Amy Tucker served as co-coaches for the 1995-96 season, which led to a Final Four appearance. VanDerveer returned for the 1996-97 season.)	Tara VanDerveer	**1990**, 1991, **1992**, 1995, 1997, 2008, 2009, 2010, 2011, 2012, 2014, 2017, **2021**, 2022	Stanford	
9	Muffet McGraw	1997, **2001**, 2011, 2012, 2013, 2014, 2015, **2018**, 2019	Notre Dame	
9 (Note: From 1982 to 1985, Barmore and Sonja Hogg served as co-coaches for Louisiana Tech)	Leon Barmore	1983, 1984, 1987, **1988**, 1989, 1990, 1994, 1998, 1999	Louisiana Tech	
8	**Dawn Staley**	2015, **2017**, 2021, **2022**, 2023, **2024**, 2025, 2026	South Carolina	
5	Andy Landers	1983, 1985, 1995, 1996, 1999	Georgia	
5	**Kim Mulkey**	**2005**, 2010, **2012**, **2019**, **2023**	Baylor (4), LSU (1)	
4	**Vic Schaefer**	2017, 2018, 2025, 2026	Mississippi State (2), Texas (2)	
4	**Jeff Walz**	2009, 2013, 2018, 2022	Louisville	
4	Gail Goestenkors	1999, 2002, 2003, 2006	Duke	
4	C. Vivian Stringer	1982, 1993, 2000, 2007	Cheyney State (1), Iowa (1), Rutgers (2)	
3	**Brenda Frese**	**2006**, 2014, 2015	Maryland	
3	Jody Conradt	**1986**, 1987, 2003	Texas	
3	Sylvia Hatchell	**1994**, 2006, 2007	North Carolina	
3	Linda Sharp	**1983, 1984**, 1986	USC	
3	Paul Sanderford	1985, 1986, 1992	Western Kentucky	
3	Joe Ciampi	1988, 1989, 1990	Auburn	
3	Sherri Coale	2002, 2009, 2010	Oklahoma	
3	Debbie Ryan	1990, 1991, 1992	Virginia	
3	Sonja Hogg	**1982**, 1983, 1984	Louisiana Tech	
3	Marianne Stanley	1983, **1985**, 1996	Old Dominion, Stanford	
2	Pokey Chatman	2005, 2006	LSU	
2	Chris Weller	1982, 1989	Maryland	
2	Gary Blair	1998, **2011**	Arkansas (1), Texas A&M (1)	
2	Cheryl Burnett	1992, 2001	Missouri State	
2	Joan Bonvicini	1987, 1988	Long Beach State	
2	Lisa Bluder	2023, 2024	Iowa	
2	**Cori Close**	2025, 2026	UCLA	
1	**Kenny Brooks**	2023	Virginia Tech	
1	Linda Harper	1985	Louisiana-Monroe	
1	**Mike Neighbors**	2016	Washington	
1	Quentin Hillsman	2016	Syracuse	
1	Scott Rueck	2016	Oregon State	
1	**Lindsay Gottlieb**	2013	California	
1	Pam Borton	2004	Minnesota	
1	Joanne P. McCallie	2005	Michigan State	
1	Rick Moody	1994	Alabama	
1	Rene Portland	2000	Penn State	
1	Marsha Sharp	**1993**	Texas Tech	
1	**Adia Barnes**	2021	Arizona	
1	Jim Foster	1993	Vanderbilt	
1	Kay Yow	1998	NC State	
1	**Kelly Graves**	2019	Oregon	
1	Nancy Darsch	1993	Ohio State	
1	Wendy Larry	1997	Old Dominion	
1	Lin Dunn	1994	Purdue	
1	Carolyn Peck	**1999**	Purdue	
1	**Kristy Curry**	2001	Purdue	
1	Sue Gunter	2004	LSU	
1	Van Chancellor	2008	LSU	
1	Winthrop McGriff	1984	Cheyney State	
1	**Wes Moore**	2024	NC State	
1	Amy Tucker/Marianne Stanley	1996	Stanford	
1	Bob Starkey	2007	LSU	

== Coaches with multiple NCAA Division I Championships ==
This is a list of NCAA women's basketball coaches who have won multiple championships. This list includes only championships since 1982.

Number	Coach	Years	Program(s)	Refs
12	Geno Auriemma	1995, 2000, 2002–2004, 2009, 2010, 2013–2016, 2025	Connecticut	
8	Pat Summitt	1987, 1989, 1991, 1996–1998, 2007, 2008	Tennessee	
4	Kim Mulkey	2005, 2012, 2019, 2023	Baylor (3), LSU (1)	
3	Dawn Staley	2017, 2022, 2024	South Carolina	
3	Tara VanDerveer	1990, 1992, 2021	Stanford	
2	Muffet McGraw	2001, 2018	Notre Dame	
2	Linda Sharp	1983, 1984	USC	
