= Mery Andrade =

Portuguese basketball player and coach (born 1975)

Toronto Raptors
- Title: Assistant Coach
- League: NBA

Personal information
- Born: December 31, 1975 (age 50) Cape Verde
- Listed height: 6 ft 0 in (1.83 m)
- Listed weight: 169 lb (77 kg)

Career information
- College: Old Dominion (1995–1999)
- WNBA draft: 1999: 2nd round, 23rd overall pick
- Drafted by: Cleveland Rockers
- Playing career: 1999–2015
- Position: Forward
- Number: 10, 23

Career history

Playing
- 1999–2002: Cleveland Rockers
- 2004: Charlotte Sting

Coaching
- 2015–2019: San Diego (assistant)
- 2019–2022: Erie BayHawks / Birmingham Squadron (assistant)
- 2022: Petro de Luanda (assistant)
- 2023–present: Toronto Raptors (assistant)
- Stats at Basketball Reference

Mery Elizabeth Fernandes Andrade (born December 31, 1975) is a Portuguese professional basketball coach and former player, currently serving as an assistant coach for the Toronto Raptors in the National Basketball Association (NBA). Born in Cape Verde and raised in Portugal, Andrade had a distinguished playing career before transitioning into coaching.

== Playing career ==
Andrade played for Old Dominion University from 1995 to 1999. During her tenure, she was instrumental in leading the Old Dominion Lady Monarchs to four consecutive NCAA Tournament appearances, including a run to the 1997 NCAA Division I Women's Basketball Championship game.

She earned multiple accolades, including:

- Colonial Athletic Association (CAA) Co-Player of the Year (1999)
- Three-time CAA Defensive Player of the Year
- Three-time All-CAA Selection
- CAA All-Defensive Team Selection
- Ranks fourth all-time in CAA history with 382 career steals

In 2010, Old Dominion University retired her jersey number 23 in recognition of her contributions.

WNBA

Andrade was selected 23rd overall in the 1999 WNBA Draft by the Cleveland Rockers. She played five seasons in the league:

- Cleveland Rockers (1999–2002): Contributed to multiple playoff appearances, including an Eastern Conference Finals run in 2000.
- Charlotte Sting (2004): Played her final WNBA season in Charlotte.

== International career ==
Beyond the WNBA, Andrade had a prolific international playing career:

- Portugal: Played for Quinta dos Lombos, winning both the League Championship and Cup Championship.
- Italy: Played for teams including TermoCarispe La Spezia, Pool Comense (Italian Championship), Phard Napoli (FIBA Cup Champion), Umana Venezia (Italian Cup), Le Mura Lucca, and DIKE Napoli.
- Italian League: Three-time All-Star in Italy.
- Portuguese National Team: Represented Portugal for 19 years, solidifying her status as one of the country’s greatest basketball players.

== Coaching career ==
Following her playing career, Andrade transitioned into coaching, working at multiple levels of professional and international basketball.

Assistant Coaching Experience

- Toronto Raptors (NBA, 2023–Present): Currently an assistant coach under Darko Rajaković.
- Boston Celtics (Summer League, 2023): Served as an assistant coach for the Boston Celtics' Summer League team.
- Petro de Luanda (BAL, 2022): Assistant coach in the Basketball Africa League.
- Birmingham Squadron (NBA G League, 2021–2023): Played a key role in player development, contributing to multiple playoff appearances.
- Erie BayHawks (NBA G League, 2019–2021): Developed players and helped shape team success.

Head Coaching Experience

- Led a showcase team in 2021.
- Head coach of Quinta dos Lombos Youth International Team (2013–2014).

== Education ==
- Old Dominion University – Bachelor’s Degree in Sport Science
- Coaching Certifications:
  - Italy: Coach certificate Level II
  - Portugal: Coach certificate Level II
  - Italy: Personal Trainer Certification in Health & Wellness

== Career statistics ==
Legend
GP	Games played	GS	Games started	MPG	Minutes per game	RPG	Rebounds per game
APG	Assists per game	SPG	Steals per game	BPG	Blocks per game	PPG	Points per game
TO	Turnovers per game	FG%	Field-goal percentage	3P%	3-point field-goal percentage	FT%	Free-throw percentage
**Bold**	Career best	°	League leader

=== College ===
Year	Team	GP	Points	FG%	FT%	RPG	APG	BPG	PPG
1995-96	Old Dominion University	32	352	**51.7%**	70.8%	4.8	2.7	0.7	11.0
1996-97	Old Dominion University	**36**	407	44.8%	73.4%	6.3	3.6	0.4	11.3
1997-98	Old Dominion University	32	**455**	48.4%	72.8%	6.8	3.5	0.3	**14.2**
1998-99	Old Dominion University	32	408	45.0%	**78.4%**	**6.8**	**3.7**	**0.9**	12.8
Career		132	1622	47.2%	74.0%	6.2	3.4	0.6	12.3

=== WNBA ===
==== Regular season ====
Year	Team	GP	GS	MPG	FG%	3P%	FT%	RPG	APG	SPG	BPG	TO	PPG
1999	Cleveland	**32**°	1	11.4	.390	.292	.692	1.6	1.5	'.6	.1	1.3	2.2
2000	Cleveland	**32**°	18	24.9	**.456**	**.360**	.750	**3.0**	2.3	1.3	**.3**	2.0	**8.3**
2001	Cleveland	**32**°	**32**°	**27.9**	.339	.200	.667	2.7	**3.1**	**1.6**	**.3**	1.9	4.8
2002	Cleveland	**32**°	16	20.8	.306	.192	.783	1.8	2.1	.9	.2	1.3	2.8
2004	Charlotte	12	0	5.4	.429	.000	**1.000**	.3	.6	.0	.1	**.3**	.8
Career	5 years, 2 teams	140	67	19.9	.381	.288	.729	2.1	2.1	1.0	.2	1.5	4.2

==== Playoffs ====
Year	Team	GP	GS	MPG	FG%	3P%	FT%	RPG	APG	SPG	BPG	TO	PPG
2000	Cleveland	**6**	**5**	**27.7**	.242	.000	**.556**	2.8	**2.3**	**1.0**	.5	**1.8**	3.5
2001	Cleveland	3	3	24.0	**.353**	**.500**	–	**3.0**	.3	.7	**.7**	2.3	**4.3**
Career	3 years, 1 teams	9	8	26.4	.280	.091	.556	2.9	1.7	.9	.6	2.0	3.8

== Languages ==
Andrade is fluent in English, Italian, Portuguese, Spanish, and Criolo.

== Philanthropy and Community Involvement ==
Andrade is actively involved in charitable activities, including cancer awareness campaigns, basketball clinics, and community outreach programs.

== Awards and honors ==
- #23 Jersey Retired by Old Dominion University
- CAA Co-Player of the Year (1999)
- Three-time CAA Defensive Player of the Year
- Three-time All-CAA Selection
- Three-time CAA All-Defensive Team Selection
- Ranks fourth all-time in CAA history with 382 career steals
- Three-time Italian League All-Star
- WNBA Eastern Conference Finals appearance (2000)
- Two-time WNBA Playoffs participant
