= George Washington Revolutionaries basketball =

George Washington Revolutionaries basketball may refer to either of the basketball teams that represent George Washington University:

- George Washington Revolutionaries men's basketball
- George Washington Revolutionaries women's basketball
