= 1996–97 Notre Dame Fighting Irish women's basketball team =

Intercollegiate basketball season

1996–97 Notre Dame Fighting Irish women's basketball

NCAA tournament, Final Four
- Conference: Big East Conference

Ranking
- Coaches: No. 5
- AP: No. 15
- Record: 31–7 (17–1 Big East)
- Head coach: Muffet McGraw (10th season)
- Assistant coach: Kevin McGuff (1st season)
- Home arena: Edmund P. Joyce Center

1996–97 Big East Conference women's basketball standings
	Conf.				Overall
Team	W		L	PCT	W		L	PCT
No. 1 Connecticut †	18	–	0	1.000	33	–	1	.971
No. 15 Notre Dame	17	–	1	.944	31	–	7	.816
Boston College	13	–	5	.722	16	–	12	.571
West Virginia	11	–	6	.647	19	–	12	.613
Georgetown	9	–	9	.500	17	–	11	.607
Miami (FL)	8	–	10	.444	15	–	14	.517
Villanova	8	–	10	.444	14	–	14	.500
Providence	8	–	10	.444	13	–	14	.481
Rutgers	8	–	10	.444	11	–	17	.393
Seton Hall	7	–	11	.389	10	–	17	.370
Syracuse	4	–	14	.222	6	–	21	.222
Pittsburgh	3	–	15	.167	8	–	22	.267
St. John's	3	–	15	.167	5	–	22	.185
† 1997 Big East Tournament winner Rankings from AP poll

The 1996–97 Notre Dame Fighting Irish women's basketball team represented the University of Notre Dame during the 1996–97 NCAA Division I women's basketball season. The Fighting Irish, led by tenth-year head coach Muffet McGraw, played their home games at Edmund P. Joyce Center as members of the Big East Conference. The Irish finished the season 31–7, 17–1 in Big East play to earn second-place in the regular season standings. They defeated Rutgers and Georgetown before losing to UConn in the Big East Women's Tournament championship. Notre Dame received an at-large bid as the No. 6 seed in the East (Columbia) region. They defeated Memphis and Texas to advance to the Sweet Sixteen. There they defeated Alabama and George Washington to advance to the first Final Four in program history. The Irish were beaten by Tennessee, the eventual National champion, 80–66.

== Roster ==
1996–97 Notre Dame Fighting Irish women's basketball team
Players
Coaches

Pos.	#	Name	Height	Year	Previous school	Hometown
F/C	12	Katryna Gaither	6 ft 4 in (1.93 m)	Sr
G	21	Beth Morgan	6 ft 0 in (1.83 m)	Sr	Bloomington South	Bloomington, IN
G	33	Niele Ivey	5 ft 8 in (1.73 m)	Fr	Cor Jesu Academy	St. Louis, MO

Head coach

- Muffet McGraw (Saint Joseph's)

Assistant coach(es)

- Kevin McGuff

Legend

- (C) Team captain
- (S) Suspended
- (I) Ineligible
- (W) Walk-on
- Injured
- Current redshirt

Roster

== Schedule and results ==
Date time, TV	Rank^{#}	Opponent^{#}	Result	Record	Site (attendance) city, state
Regular season
Nov 17, 1996*	No. 20	vs. No. 6 Iowa	W 61–50	2–0	
Nov 19, 1996*	No. 20	vs. No. 3 Tennessee	L 59–72	2–1	
Nov 21, 1996*	No. 20	vs. No. 8 NC State	W 64–53	3–1	
Feb 9, 1997	No. 15	at No. 1 Connecticut	L 49–72	20–5 (12–1)	Gampel Pavilion; Storrs, Connecticut
Feb 25, 1997	No. 14	at West Virginia	W 80–67	25–5 (17–1)	WVU Coliseum; Morgantown, West Virginia
Big East tournament
Mar 1, 1997*	(2) No. 14	vs. (7) Rutgers; Quarterfinals	W 86–58	26–5	Gambel Pavilion; Storrs, Connecticut
Mar 3, 1997*	(2) No. 13	vs. Georgetown; Semifinals	W 83–43	27–5	Gambel Pavilion; Storrs, Connecticut
Mar 4, 1997*	(2) No. 13	at (1) No. 1 Connecticut; Championship game	L 68–77	27–6	Gambel Pavilion; Storrs, Connecticut
NCAA women's tournament
Mar 14, 1997*	(6 E) No. 15	vs. (11 E) Memphis; First round	W 93–62	28–6	Frank Erwin Center; Austin, Texas
Mar 16, 1997*	(6 E) No. 15	vs. (3 E) No. 14 Texas; Second round	W 86–83	29–6	Frank Erwin Center; Austin, Texas
Mar 22, 1997*	(6 E) No. 15	vs. (2 E) No. 8 Alabama; Regional Semifinal – Sweet Sixteen	W 87–71	30–6	Carolina Coliseum; Columbia, South Carolina
Mar 24, 1997*	(6 E) No. 15	vs. (5 E) No. 22 George Washington; Regional Final – Elite Eight	W 62–52	31–6	Carolina Coliseum; Columbia, South Carolina
Mar 28, 1997*	(6 E) No. 15	vs. (3 MW) No. 10 Tennessee; National Semifinal – Final Four	L 66–80	31–7	Riverfront Coliseum; Cincinnati, Ohio
*Non-conference game. ^{#}Rankings from AP Poll. (#) Tournament seedings in parentheses. E=East Region. All times are in Eastern.
