= 1996–97 Old Dominion Lady Monarchs basketball team =

1996–97 Old Dominion Lady Monarchs basketball season

1996–97 Old Dominion Lady Monarchs basketball

CAA tournament champions

NCAA tournament, Runner-up
- Conference: Colonial Athletic Association

Ranking
- Coaches: No. 2
- AP: No. 2
- Record: 34–2 (16–0 CAA)
- Head coach: Wendy Larry (10th season)
- Home arena: ODU Fieldhouse; Norfolk Scope (alternate)

1996–97 CAA women's basketball standings
| | Conf. | | | | Overall |
| Team | W | | L | PCT | W | | L | PCT |
|---|---|---|---|---|---|---|---|---|
| No. 2 Old Dominion † | 16 | – | 0 | 1.000 | 34 | – | 2 | .944 |
| American | 11 | – | 5 | .688 | 18 | – | 9 | .667 |
| Richmond | 10 | – | 6 | .625 | 16 | – | 11 | .593 |
| James Madison | 9 | – | 7 | .563 | 19 | – | 9 | .679 |
| George Mason | 8 | – | 8 | .500 | 15 | – | 12 | .556 |
| East Carolina | 6 | – | 10 | .375 | 13 | – | 16 | .448 |
| VCU | 5 | – | 11 | .313 | 13 | – | 15 | .464 |
| UNC Wilmington | 4 | – | 12 | .250 | 11 | – | 16 | .407 |
| William & Mary | 3 | – | 13 | .188 | 7 | – | 20 | .259 |
† 1997 CAA tournament winner Rankings from AP poll

The 1996–97 Old Dominion Lady Monarchs basketball team represented Old Dominion University during the 1996–97 NCAA Division I women's basketball season. The Monarchs, led by tenth-year head coach Wendy Larry, played their home games at the Old Dominion University Fieldhouse, and alternatively at the Norfolk Scope, in Norfolk, Virginia. They were members of the Colonial Athletic Association.

== Roster ==
1996–97 Old Dominion Lady Monarchs women's basketball team
Players
Coaches

| Pos. | # | Name | Height | Year | Hometown |
|---|---|---|---|---|---|
| F/C | 00 | Nyree Roberts | 6 ft 4 in (1.93 m) | Jr |
| G | 12 | Aubrey Eblin | 5 ft 8 in (1.73 m) | So |
| PG | 21 | Ticha Penicheiro | 5 ft 11 in (1.8 m) | Jr |
| F | 23 | Mery Andrade | 6 ft 0 in (1.83 m) | So |
| F/C | 33 | Clarisse Machanguana | 6 ft 5 in (1.96 m) | Sr |

Head coach

- Wendy Larry

Assistant coach(es)

Legend

- (C) Team captain
- (S) Suspended
- (I) Ineligible
- (W) Walk-on
- Injured
- Current redshirt

Roster

== Schedule and results ==
| Date time, TV | Rank^{#} | Opponent^{#} | Result | Record | Site (attendance) city, state |
Regular season
| Nov 15, 1996* | No. 7 | George Washington; Preseason WNIT | W 70–44 | 1–0 | ODU Fieldhouse; Norfolk, VA |
| Nov 17, 1996* | No. 7 | No. 13 NC State; Preseason WNIT | L 62–65 | 1–1 | ODU Fieldhouse; Norfolk, VA |
| Nov 23, 1996* | No. 9 | Indiana State; Dial Classic | W 116–26 | 2–1 | ODU Fieldhouse; Norfolk, VA |
| Nov 24, 1996* | No. 9 | Wake Forest; Dial Classic | W 82–41 | 3–1 | ODU Fieldhouse; Norfolk, VA |
| Dec 1, 1996* | No. 8 | at Miami (FL) | W 94–55 | 4–1 | Miami Arena; Miami, FL |
| Dec 7, 1996* | No. 6 | vs. No. 15 Duke; Central Fidelity Classic | W 89–77 | 5–1 | Richmond Coliseum; Richmond, VA |
| Dec 8, 1996* | No. 6 | vs. No. 13 Vanderbilt; Central Fidelity Classic | W 70–59 | 6–1 | Richmond Coliseum; Richmond, VA |
| Dec 14, 1996* | No. 6 | at Purdue | W 55–51 | 7–1 | West Lafayette, IN; Mackey Arena |
| Dec 17, 1996* | No. 4 | No. 1 Stanford | W 83–66 | 8–1 | ODU Fieldhouse; Norfolk, VA |
| Dec 21, 1996* | No. 4 | at Rutgers | W 86-59 | 9–1 | Piscataway, NJ |
| Jan 3, 1997 | No. 2 | Richmond | W 89-53 | 10–1 | ODU Fieldhouse; Norfolk, VA |
| Jan 5, 1997 | No. 2 | at East Carolina | W 74-36 | 11–1 | Greenville, NC |
| Jan 7, 1997* | No. 2 | No. 9 Tennessee | W 83–72 | 12–1 | Norfolk Scope; Norfolk, VA |
| Jan 12, 1997 | No. 2 | William & Mary | W 79-36 | 13–1 | ODU Fieldhouse; Norfolk, VA |
| Jan 17, 1997 | No. 2 | at James Madison | W 78-53 | 14–1 | Harrisonburg, VA |
| Jan 21, 1997 | No. 2 | UNC-Wilmington | W 89-51 | 15–1 | ODU Fieldhouse; Norfolk, VA |
| Jan 24, 1997 | No. 2 | at American | W 104-59 | 16–1 | Washington, DC |
| Jan 26, 1997 | No. 2 | George Mason | W 107-62 | 17–1 | ODU Fieldhouse; Norfolk, VA |
| Jan 31, 1997 | No. 2 | VCU | W 93-35 | 18–1 | ODU Fieldhouse; Norfolk, VA |
| Feb 2, 1997 | No. 2 | at Richmond | W 88-65 | 19–1 | Richmond, VA |
| Feb 7, 1997 | No. 2 | James Madison | W 77-49 | 20–1 | ODU Fieldhouse; Norfolk, VA |
| Feb 9, 1997 | No. 2 | American | W 94-57 | 21–1 | ODU Fieldhouse; Norfolk, VA |
| Feb 11, 1997 | No. 2 | at UNC-Wilmington | W 97-58 | 22–1 | Wilmington, NC |
| Feb 16, 1997 | No. 2 | at William & Mary | W 96-36 | 23–1 | Williamsburg, VA |
| Feb 18, 1997 | No. 2 | East Carolina | W 88-43 | 24–1 | ODU Fieldhouse; Norfolk, VA |
| Feb 21, 1997 | No. 2 | at VCU | W 94-47 | 25–1 | Richmond, VA |
| Feb 23, 1997 | No. 2 | at George Mason | W 102–46 | 26–1 (16–0) | Patriot Center; Fairfax, VA |
CAA tournament
| Feb 27, 1997* | (1) No. 2 | vs. (9) William & Mary; Quarterfinals | W 101–35 | 27–1 | Richmond Coliseum; Richmond, VA |
| Feb 28, 1997* | (1) No. 2 | vs. (4) James Madison; Semifinals | W 86–48 | 28–1 | Richmond Coliseum; Richmond, VA |
| Mar 2, 1997* | (1) No. 2 | vs. (6) East Carolina; Championship game | W 83–46 | 29–1 | Richmond Coliseum; Richmond, VA |
NCAA tournament
| Mar 15, 1997* | (1 ME) No. 2 | vs. (16 ME) Liberty; First round | W 102–52 | 30–1 | ODU Fieldhouse; Norfolk, VA |
| Mar 17, 1997* | (1 ME) No. 2 | vs. (8 ME) Purdue; Second round | W 69–65 ^{OT} | 31–1 | ODU Fieldhouse; Norfolk, VA |
| Mar 22, 1997* | (1 ME) No. 2 | vs. (4 ME) No. 9 LSU; Regional Semifinal – Sweet Sixteen | W 62–49 | 32–1 | Mackey Arena; West Lafayette, IN |
| Mar 24, 1997* | (1 ME) No. 2 | vs. (3 ME) No. 7 Florida; Regional Final – Elite Eight | W 53–51 | 33–1 | Mackey Arena; West Lafayette, IN |
| Mar 28, 1997* | (1 ME) No. 2 | vs. (1 W) No. 3 Stanford; National Semifinal – Final Four | W 83–82 ^{OT} | 34–1 | Riverfront Coliseum; Cincinnati, OH |
| Mar 30, 1997* | (1 ME) No. 2 | vs. (3 MW) No. 10 Tennessee; National Championship | L 59–68 | 34–2 | Riverfront Coliseum; Cincinnati, OH |
*Non-conference game. ^{#}Rankings from AP Poll. (#) Tournament seedings in parentheses. All times are in Eastern. E = East, MW = Midwest

- Source: Old Dominion Athletics,

== Rankings ==
Ranking movements Legend: ██ Increase in ranking ██ Decrease in ranking
| | Week | | | | | | | | | | | | | | | | | | |
| Poll | Pre | 1 | 2 | 3 | 4 | 5 | 6 | 7 | 8 | 9 | 10 | 11 | 12 | 13 | 14 | 15 | 16 | 17 | Final |
|---|---|---|---|---|---|---|---|---|---|---|---|---|---|---|---|---|---|---|---|
| AP | 7 | 9 | 8 | 6 | 6 | 4 | 2 | 2 | 2 | 2 | 2 | 2 | 2 | 2 | 2 | 2 | 2 | 2 | Not released |
| Coaches | 7 | 9 | 8 | 6 | 6 | 5 | 4 | 4 | 4 | 3 | 3 | 3 | 3 | 3 | 3 | 3 | 3 | 3 | 2 |
