= 1996–97 Stanford Cardinal women's basketball team =

Intercollegiate basketball season

1996–97 Stanford Cardinal women's basketball

Pac-10 champions

NCAA tournament, Final Four
- Conference: Pacific-10 Conference

Ranking
- Coaches: No. 3
- AP: No. 3
- Record: 34–2 (18–0 Pac-10)
- Head coach: Tara VanDerveer (11th season)
- Assistant coaches: Amy Tucker; Reneé Brown
- Home arena: Maples Pavilion

1996–97 Pacific-10 Conference women's basketball standings
	Conf.				Overall
Team	W		L	PCT	W		L	PCT
No. 3 Stanford	18	–	0	1.000	34	–	2	.944
Oregon	14	–	4	.778	22	–	7	.759
USC	13	–	5	.722	20	–	9	.690
Arizona	12	–	6	.667	23	–	8	.742
Washington	12	–	6	.667	17	–	11	.607
UCLA	7	–	11	.389	13	–	14	.481
Oregon State	5	–	13	.278	11	–	16	.407
Washington State	4	–	14	.222	10	–	17	.370
Arizona State	3	–	15	.167	9	–	19	.321
California	2	–	16	.111	6	–	21	.222
Rankings from AP Poll

The 1996–97 Stanford Cardinal women's basketball team represented Stanford University as members of the Pacific-10 Conference during the 1996–97 NCAA Division I women's basketball season. The Cardinal were led by head coach Tara VanDerveer and played their home games at Maples Pavilion. They won the Pac-10 Championship (18–0) and reached the Final Four for the sixth time in eight seasons.

The Cardinal finished the season with a record of 34–2 with both losses coming to National runner-up Old Dominion. This season capped a 3-year run with each season ending at the Final Four, and with an overall record of 93–8 and a 53–1 record in Pac-10 games.

== Roster ==
1996–97 Stanford Cardinal women's basketball team
Players
Coaches

Pos.	#	Name	Height	Year	Hometown
F	0	Olympia Scott	6 ft 2 in (1.88 m)	Jr	Los Angeles, California
G	10	Jamila Wideman	5 ft 6 in (1.68 m)	Sr	Amherst, Massachusetts
F	13	Vanessa Nygaard	6 ft 0 in (1.83 m)	RS Jr	Carlsbad, California
G	15	Regan Freuen	6 ft 0 in (1.83 m)	Jr	Spokane, Washington
G	21	Charmin Smith	5 ft 10 in (1.78 m)	Sr	St. Louis, Missouri
G		Milena Flores	5 ft 6 in (1.68 m)	Fr
F	24	Kristin Folkl	6 ft 2 in (1.88 m)	Jr	St. Louis, Missouri
F	30	Kate Starbird	6 ft 2 in (1.88 m)	Sr	Tacoma, Washington
C	32	Chandra Benton	6 ft 7 in (2.01 m)	RS So	Lake Oswego, Oregon
F	33	Tara Harrington	6 ft 0 in (1.83 m)	Sr	Klamath Falls, Oregon
C	34	Naomi Mulitauaopele	6 ft 3 in (1.91 m)	Jr	Seattle, Washington
F/C	44	Heather Owen	6 ft 2 in (1.88 m)	Jr	Moscow, Idaho

Head coach

- Tara VanDerveer

Assistant coach(es)

Legend

- (C) Team captain
- (S) Suspended
- (I) Ineligible
- (W) Walk-on
- Injured
- Current redshirt

Roster

== Schedule ==
Date time, TV	Rank^{#}	Opponent^{#}	Result	Record	Site (attendance) city, state
Regular season
Nov 16, 1996*	No. 1	No. 2 Alabama	W 74–65	1–0	Maples Pavilion; Stanford, CA
Nov 21, 1996*	No. 1	Northern Arizona	W 96–48	2–0	Maples Pavilion; Stanford, CA
Nov 23, 1996*	No. 1	Purdue	W 83–57	3–0	Maples Pavilion; Stanford, CA
Nov 28, 1996*	No. 1	vs. Houston; Wahine Classic	W 83–51	4–0	Honolulu, HI
Nov 29, 1996*	No. 1	vs. No. 24 Stephen F. Austin; Wahine Classic	W 85–62	5–0	Honolulu, HI
Nov 30, 1996*	No. 1	vs. Michigan; Wahine Classic	W 77–74	6–0	Honolulu, HI
Dec 5, 1996*	No. 1	vs. UMass	W 100–47	7–0	Maples Pavilion; Stanford, CA
Dec 7, 1996*	No. 1	at San Francisco	W 61–46	8–0	War Memorial Gymnasium; San Francisco, CA
Dec 14, 1996*	No. 1	at No. 5 Tennessee	W 82–65	9–0	Thompson–Boling Arena; Knoxville, TN
Dec 17, 1996*	No. 1	at No. 4 Old Dominion	L 66–83	9–1	ODU Fieldhouse; Norfolk, VA
Dec 19, 1996*	No. 1	vs. Ohio; Diet Coke Shootout	W 95–59	10–1	Leavey Center; Santa Clara, CA
Dec 20, 1996*	No. 1	at Santa Clara; Diet Coke Shootout	W 80–57	11–1	Leavey Center; Santa Clara, CA
Dec 27, 1996*	No. 3	at Colorado	W 64–48	12–1	Coors Events Conference Center; Boulder, CO
Jan 1, 1997	No. 3	Arizona State	W 96–64	13–1 (1–0)	Maples Pavilion; Stanford, CA
Jan 4, 1997	No. 3	Arizona	W 91–68	14–1 (2–0)	Maples Pavilion; Stanford, CA
Jan 9, 1997	No. 3	at UCLA	W 74–62	15–1 (3–0)	Pauley Pavilion; Los Angeles, CA
Jan 11, 1997	No. 3	at USC	W 77–76	16–1 (4–0)	LA Memorial Sports Arena; Los Angeles, CA
Jan 15, 1997	No. 3	Oregon	W 85–61	17–1 (5–0)	Maples Pavilion; Stanford, CA
Jan 17, 1997	No. 3	Oregon State	W 72–54	18–1 (6–0)	Maples Pavilion; Stanford, CA
Jan 22, 1997	No. 3	at Washington	W 90–64	19–1 (7–0)	Hec Edmundson Pavilion; Seattle, WA
Jan 24, 1997	No. 3	at Washington State	W 84–75	20–1 (8–0)	Beasley Coliseum; Pullman, WA
Jan 30, 1997	No. 3	California	W 95–44	21–1 (9–0)	Maples Pavilion; Stanford, CA
Feb 5, 1997	No. 3	USC	W 103–69	22–1 (10–0)	Maples Pavilion; Stanford, CA
Feb 7, 1997	No. 3	UCLA	W 98–68	23–1 (11–0)	Maples Pavilion; Stanford, CA
Feb 12, 1997	No. 3	at Oregon State	W 79–67	24–1 (12–0)	Gill Coliseum; Corvallis, OR
Feb 14, 1997	No. 3	at Oregon	W 69–66	25–1 (13–0)	McArthur Court; Eugene, OR
Feb 19, 1997	No. 3	Washington State	W 82–45	26–1 (14–0)	Maples Pavilion; Stanford, CA
Feb 21, 1997	No. 3	Washington	W 106–76	27–1 (15–0)	Maples Pavilion; Stanford, CA
Feb 27, 1997	No. 3	at California	W 82–50	28–1 (16–0)	Haas Pavilion; Berkeley, CA
Mar 5, 1997	No. 3	at Arizona	W 90–65	29–1 (17–0)	McKale Center; Tucson, AZ
Mar 7, 1997	No. 3	at Arizona State	W 81–62	30–1 (18–0)	Wells Fargo Arena; Tempe, AZ
NCAA women's tournament
Mar 15, 1997*	(1 W) No. 3	(16 W) Howard; First Round	W 111–59	31–1	Maples Pavilion; Stanford, CA
Mar 17, 1997*	(1 W) No. 3	(8 W) No. 17 Texas Tech; Second Round	W 67–45	32–1	Maples Pavilion; Stanford, CA
Mar 22, 1997*	(1 W) No. 3	vs. (4 W) No. 12 Virginia; Regional Semifinals – Sweet Sixteen	W 91–69	33–1	Dahlberg Arena; Missoula, MT
March 23, 1997*	(1 W) No. 3	at (2 W) No. 6 Georgia; Regional Final – Elite Eight	W 82–47	34–1	Dahlberg Arena; Missoula, MT
Mar 28, 1997*	(1 W) No. 3	vs. (1 ME) No. 2 Old Dominion; National Semifinal – Final Four	L 82–83 ^{OT}	34–2	Riverfront Coliseum; Cincinnati, OH
*Non-conference game. ^{#}Rankings from AP Poll. (#) Tournament seedings in parentheses. W=Stanford, CA regional. All times are in Pacific Time.

== Rankings ==
Ranking movements Legend: ██ Increase in ranking ██ Decrease in ranking
	Week																		
Poll	Pre	1	2	3	4	5	6	7	8	9	10	11	12	13	14	15	16	17	Final
AP	1	1	1	1	1	1	3	3	3	3	3	3	3	3	3	3	3	3	Not released
Coaches	1	1	1	1	1	1	2	2	2	2	2	2	2	2	2	2	2	2	3
