= Karen Barefoot =

American basketball coach

Playing career
- 1991–1995: Christopher Newport

Coaching career (HC unless noted)
- 1995–2001: The Apprentice School
- 2001–2005: Lenoir–Rhyne
- 2005–2008: Old Dominion (assistant)
- 2008–2011: Elon
- 2011–2017: Old Dominion
- 2017–2022: UNC Wilmington

Head coaching record
- Overall: 356–272(.567)

Karen Barefoot is an American basketball coach. She recently was head coach for the UNC Wilmington women's basketball team. Barefoot is the first basketball player to record 2,000 points and 1,000 assists in a career for any NCAA division, male or female.

== Playing career ==
Barefoot, a Newport News, Virginia native, played high school basketball at Menchville High School, earning Most Outstanding Player honors from Peninsula Sports Club four times. She received scholarship offers from several colleges but chose to remain close to home and attended Christopher Newport University along with Sharon, her twin sister.

During her career at Christopher Newport, playing under coach Cathy Parson, she helped the team to three NCAA tournament invitations. In her freshman year the team made it to the Sweet 16. She earned Kodak/WBCA All-America honors during her career and was named the All–USA South Atlantic conference player of the year twice. She continued her domination of the Peninsula Sports Club honors, winning the most outstanding player award four times during her college career. She was the national leader in assists in 1991, 1992, 1993 and 1994 among Division III schools, amassing a total of 1002 assists in her career still the only Division III player to record over 1000 assists in a career. In addition to her assists records, Barefoot is the first basketball player to record 2000 points and 1000 assists in a career for any NCAA division, male or female.

Barefoot was inducted into the Christopher Newport University Athletics Hall of Fame in 1999.

=== Christopher Newport statistics ===
Legend
GP	Games played	GS	Games started	MPG	Minutes per game	RPG	Rebounds per game
APG	Assists per game	SPG	Steals per game	BPG	Blocks per game	PPG	Points per game
TO	Turnovers per game	FG%	Field-goal percentage	3P%	3-point field-goal percentage	FT%	Free-throw percentage
**Bold**	Career best	°	League leader

Year	Team	GP	Points	PPG	FG%	3P%	FT%	APG	BPG	SPG
1991	Christopher Newport	27	441	16.3	**52.1%**	18.2%	72.2%	9.8	-	-
1992	Christopher Newport	**28**	546	19.5	43.2%	**34.6%**	69.9%	8.1	-	-
1993	Christopher Newport	**28**	457	16.3	45.5%	22.9%	70.8%	8.4	0.0	4.6
1994	Christopher Newport	25	**629**	**25.2**	42.4%	26.0%	**76.6%**	**10.9**	0.0	**5.2**
Career		108	2073	19.2	45.1%	25.9%	72.6%	9.3	0.0	2.4

== Coaching career ==
After completing her playing career and graduating, she formed the first ever athletics program for women at The Apprentice School, Located in Newport News, Virginia in 1995. She served as head coach for six seasons, culminating in a 24–3 record and a national championship in the National Small College Athletic Association. She was named the NSCAA National Coach of the Year in both 1999 and 2001.

In 2001, Barefoot moved to Lenoir Rhyne, a division II school in Hickory, North Carolina. she remained there for four years, recording double-digit wins in each year, and tying for first place in the South Atlantic Conference in 2004.

After four years there, Barefoot accepted a position as assistant coach under the legendary Wendy Larry at Old Dominion. She was very familiar with the ODU program because she had attended many games with her father and grandfather. She had a favorite player — Nancy Lieberman— in whose honor Barefoot chose to wear number 10 as a player number at Christopher Newport.

After three years as an assistant coach at the Division I level, Barefoot was invited to become the head coach of Elon. The first year turned out to be challenging as the team only won five games. In her third season, the team won 20 games the best results ever for the school as a Division I team and reached the quarterfinals of the WBI.

In 2011, Wendy Larry left Old Dominion after 24 seasons and the school reached out to Barefoot to become the new head coach. Barefoot remained at Old Dominion for six seasons, which included three invitations to the WNIT and advancement to the second round of the WNIT in 2014 and 2015.

In 2017, Barefoot was named coach of the UNC Wilmington women's basketball program.

== Head coaching record ==
Record table
Season	Team	Overall	Conference	Standing	Postseason
The Apprentice School (USCAA independent) (1995–2001)
1995–96	Apprentice	12–2			
1996–97	Apprentice	13–12			
1997–98	Apprentice	15–8			
1998–99	Apprentice	16–11	4–1	NSCAA Third Place	
1999–00	Apprentice	23–5	5–2	NSCAA Fourth Place	
2000–01	Apprentice	24–3	4–0	NSCAA National Champions	
Apprentice:		103–41 (.689)	13–6 (.684)		
Lenoir–Rhyne (South Atlantic Conference) (2001–2005)
2001–02	Lenoir–Rhyne	19–9	9–7		
2002–03	Lenoir–Rhyne	18–12	7–7	T-3rd	
2003–04	Lenoir–Rhyne	17–11	11–3	T-1st	
2004–05	Lenoir–Rhyne	16–12	9–5	3rd	
Lenoir–Rhyne:		70–44 (.614)	36–22 (.621)		
Elon (Southern Conference) (2008–2011)
2008–09	Elon	5–26	2–18	11th	
2009–10	Elon	12–19	6–14	T-7th	
2010–11	Elon	20–13	12–8	4th	WBI Quarterfinals
Elon:		37–58 (.389)	20–40 (.333)		
Old Dominion (Colonial Athletic Association) (2011–2013)
2011–12	Old Dominion	11–21	7–11	T-8th	
2012–13	Old Dominion	19–12	10–8	T-4th	WNIT First Round
Old Dominion:		30–33 (.476)	17–19 (.472)		
Old Dominion (Conference USA) (2013–2017)
2013–14	Old Dominion	18–16	9–7	T-6th	WNIT Second Round
2014–15	Old Dominion	21–13	11–7	T-4th	WNIT Second Round
2015–16	Old Dominion	17–17	10–8	5th	
2016–17	Old Dominion	17–14	11–7	6th	
Old Dominion:		73–60 (.549)	50–29 (.633)		
UNC Wilmington (Colonial Athletic Association) (2017–present)
2017–18	UNC Wilmington	12–19	4–14	T-8th	
2018–19	UNC Wilmington	18–12	11–7	T-3rd	
2019–20	UNC Wilmington	10–20	6–12	8th	
2020–21	UNC Wilmington	3–5	0–2		
UNC Wilmington:		43–56 (.434)	15–23 (.395)		
Total:		356–272 (.567)			
National champion Postseason invitational champion Conference regular season champion Conference regular season and conference tournament champion Division regular season champion Division regular season and conference tournament champion Conference tournament champion
