= 1996–97 Tennessee Lady Volunteers basketball team =

Intercollegiate basketball season

1996–97 Tennessee Lady Volunteers basketball

NCAA tournament National Champions
- Conference: Southeastern Conference

Ranking
- Coaches: No. 1
- AP: No. 10
- Record: 29–10 (8–4 SEC)
- Head coach: Pat Summitt (23rd season)
- Assistant coaches: Mickie DeMoss; Holly Warlick
- Home arena: Thompson-Boling Arena

1996–97 SEC women's basketball standings
	Conf.				Overall
Team	W		L	PCT	W		L	PCT
No. 6 Georgia	11	–	1	.917	25	–	6	.806
No. 8 Alabama	10	–	2	.833	25	–	7	.781
No. 7 Florida	9	–	3	.750	24	–	9	.727
No. 9 LSU	9	–	3	.750	25	–	5	.833
No. 10 Tennessee	8	–	4	.667	29	–	10	.744
No. 20 Vanderbilt	6	–	6	.500	20	–	11	.645
Arkansas	5	–	7	.417	18	–	10	.643
Ole Miss	5	–	7	.417	16	–	11	.593
Auburn^{†}	5	–	7	.417	22	–	10	.688
Kentucky	2	–	10	.167	8	–	19	.296
Mississippi State	1	–	11	.083	11	–	16	.407
South Carolina	1	–	11	.083	12	–	15	.444
† 1997 SEC tournament winner Rankings from AP poll

The 1996–97 Tennessee Lady Volunteers basketball team represented the University of Tennessee as a member of the Southeastern Conference during the 1996-97 women's college basketball season. Coached by Pat Summitt, the Lady Volunteers rebounded from a challenging regular season to finish 29–10 and win back-to-back national championships, while playing one of the toughest schedules in the nation. The Lady Vols started off the season ranked number four.

== Roster ==
1996–97 Tennessee Lady Volunteers women's basketball team
Players
Coaches

Pos.	#	Name	Height	Year	Previous school	Hometown
F	3	Niya Butts	6 ft 0 in (1.83 m)	So	Americus	Americus, Georgia
F	5	Kyra Elzy	6 ft 1 in (1.85 m)	Fr	Oldham	La Grange, Kentucky
G	14	Kellie Jolly	5 ft 10 in (1.78 m)	So	White County	Sparta, Tennessee
G	21	Semeka Randall	5 ft 10 in (1.78 m)	Fr	Trinity	Cleveland, Ohio
F/C	23	Chamique Holdsclaw	6 ft 2 in (1.88 m)	So	Christ the King	Astoria, New York

Head coach

- Pat Summitt

Assistant coach(es)

- Mickie DeMoss
- Holly Warlick

Legend

- (C) Team captain
- (S) Suspended
- (I) Ineligible
- (W) Walk-on
- Injured
- Current redshirt

Roster

1996–97 Tennessee Lady Vols Basketball Roster
Number	Name	Position	Height	Year	Hometown	High School
4	Tiffani Johnson	Center	6–4	Senior	Charlotte, NC	Garinger High School
11	Laurie Milligan	Guard	5–8	Junior	Tigard, Oregon	Tigard High School
13	Misty Greene	Guard/Forward	5–9	Sophomore	Decatur, Tennessee	Meigs County High School
31	Brynae Laxton	Forward	6–0	Sophomore	Oneida, Tennessee	Oneida High School
34	LaShonda Stephens	Forward	6–3	Freshman	Canton, Georgia	Sequoyah High School

== Schedule and results ==
Date time, TV	Rank^{#}	Opponent^{#}	Result	Record	Site (attendance) city, state
Regular season
Nov 15, 1996*; 7:00 p.m.	No. 4	Austin Peay; Pre-Season Women's National Invitational Tournament	W 80–59	1–0	Thompson–Boling Arena (3,995); Knoxville, TN
Nov 17, 1996*	No. 4	No. 12 Kansas; Pre-Season Women's National Invitational Tournament	W 79–60	2–0	Thompson–Boling Arena (2,714); Knoxville, TN
Nov 19, 1996*	No. 3	vs. No. 14 Notre Dame; Pre-Season Women's National Invitational Tournament	W 72–59	3–0	Thomas Assembly Center (3,321); Ruston, Louisiana
Nov 20, 1996*	No. 3	at No. 11 Louisiana Tech; Pre-Season Women's National Invitational Tournament	L 62–64	3–1	Thomas Assembly Center (4,836); Ruston, Louisiana
Nov 23, 1996*; 4:00 p.m.	No. 3	vs. Marquette; Howard Bank Classic	W 83–68	4–1	Patrick Gym (2,308); Burlington, Vermont
Nov 24, 1996*	No. 3	at Vermont; Howard Bank Classic	W 83–68	5–1	Patrick Gym (2,425); Burlington, Vermont
Nov 26, 1996*; 7:00 p.m.	No. 5	at Wisconsin-Green Bay	W 71–36	6–1	Thompson–Boling Arena (11,915); Knoxville, TN
Dec 3, 1996*; 7:00 p.m.	No. 4	Memphis	W 79–63	7–1	Thompson–Boling Arena (8,002); Knoxville, TN
Dec 8, 1996; 2:00 p.m.	No. 5	Georgia	L 93–94 ^{OT}	7–2 (0–1)	Thompson–Boling Arena (11,324); Knoxville, TN
Dec 15, 1996*	No. 5	No. 1 Stanford	L 65–82	7–3	Thompson–Boling Arena (12,282); Knoxville, TN
Jan 7, 1997*	No. 9	at No. 2 Old Dominion	L 72–83	10–6	Norfolk Scope; Norfolk, VA
Feb 22, 1997	No. 8	No. 13 LSU	L 78–83	21–8 (8–4)	Pete Maravich Assembly Center; Baton Rouge, Louisiana
Feb 24, 1997*	No. 8	at No. 6 Louisiana Tech	L 80–98	21–9	Thomas Assembly Center; Ruston, Louisiana
SEC tournament
Feb 28, 1997*	No. 8	vs. South Carolina; First round	W 75–48	22–9	McKenzie Arena; Chattanooga, Tennessee
Mar 1, 1997*	No. 8	vs. No. 9 LSU; Quarterfinal	W 100–99 ^{OT}	23–9	McKenzie Arena; Chattanooga, Tennessee
Mar 2, 1997*	No. 8	vs. Auburn; Semifinal	L 59–61	23–10	McKenzie Arena; Chattanooga, Tennessee
NCAA tournament
Mar 15, 1997*	(3 MW) No. 10	(14 MW) Grambling State; First round	W 91–54	24–10	Thompson-Boling Arena; Knoxville, Tennessee
Mar 17, 1997*	(3 MW) No. 10	(6 MW) Oregon; Second round	W 76–59	25–10	Thompson-Boling Arena; Knoxville, Tennessee
Mar 22, 1997*	(3 MW) No. 10	vs. (2 MW) No. 18 Colorado; Regional Semifinal – Sweet Sixteen	W 75-67	26–10	Carver–Hawkeye Arena; Iowa City, Iowa
Mar 24, 1997*	(3 MW) No. 10	vs. (1 MW) No. 1 Connecticut; Regional Final – Elite Eight	W 91–81	27–10	Carver–Hawkeye Arena; Iowa City, Iowa
Mar 28, 1997*	(3 MW) No. 10	vs. (6 E) No. 15 Notre Dame; National Semifinal – Final Four	W 80–66	28–10	Riverfront Coliseum; Cincinnati, Ohio
Mar 30, 1997*	(3 MW) No. 10	vs. (1 ME) No. 2 Old Dominion; National Championship	W 68–59	29–10	Riverfront Coliseum; Cincinnati, Ohio
*Non-conference game. ^{#}Rankings from AP Poll. (#) Tournament seedings in parentheses. MW=Midwest.
