= Marianne Stanley =

American basketball coach

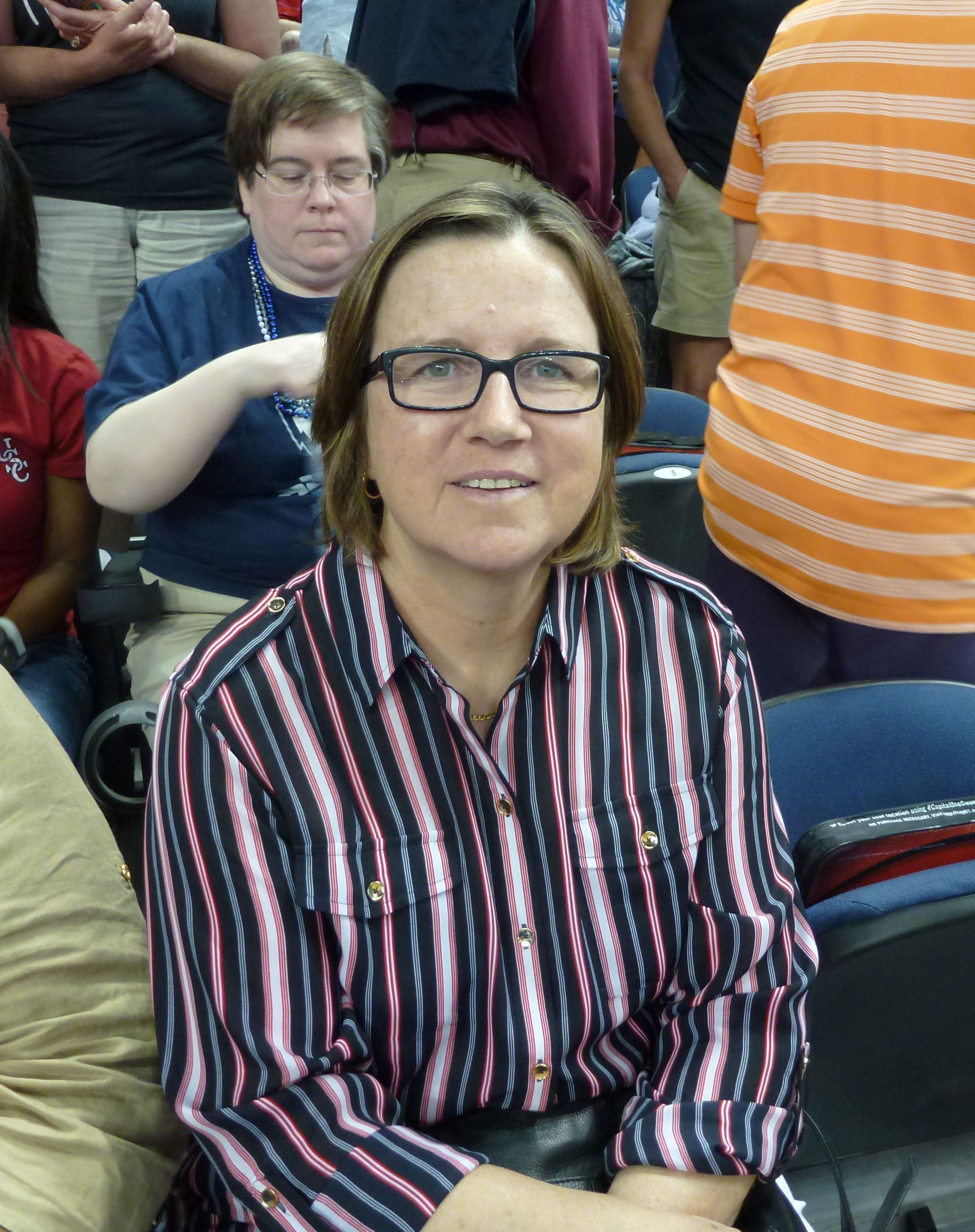

Personal information
- Born: April 29, 1954 (age 72) Yeadon, Pennsylvania, U.S.

Career information
- High school: Archbishop Prendergast (Drexel Hill, Pennsylvania)
- College: Immaculata (1972–1976)
- Position: Head coach
- Coaching career: 1977–present

Career history

Coaching
- 1977–1987: Old Dominion
- 1987–1989: Penn
- 1989–1993: USC
- 1995–1996: Stanford
- 1996–2000: California
- 2000: Los Angeles Sparks (assistant)
- 2001: Washington Mystics (assistant)
- 2002–2003: Washington Mystics
- 2004–2006: New York Liberty (assistant)
- 2006–2008: Rutgers (assistant)
- 2008–2009: Los Angeles Sparks (assistant)
- 2010–2019: Washington Mystics (assistant)
- 2020–2022: Indiana Fever

Career highlights
- 2× AIAW champion (1979, 1980); NCAA Division I tournament (1985); 2× Kodak All-American (1975, 1976); 3× NCAA Regional—Final Four (1983, 1985, 1996); WNBA Coach of the Year (2002)
- Basketball Hall of Fame
- Women's Basketball Hall of Fame

Marianne Crawford Stanley (born April 29, 1954) is an American basketball coach. She previously served as the head coach of the Washington Mystics and Indiana Fever of the Women's National Basketball Association (WNBA).

== Early life and collegiate career ==
Born in Yeadon, Pennsylvania, Stanley played high school basketball at Archbishop Prendergast High School in Drexel Hill, Pennsylvania. She was inducted into the Prendergast Hall of Fame in 2014.

After transferring from West Chester State College (now West Chester University), Stanley played collegiate basketball at Immaculata College. The women's basketball team played in six straight AIAW basketball tournament final fours from 1972 to 1977, five straight finals from 1972 to 1976. They won three consecutive national championships from 1972 to 1974. Among her teammates were future prominent women's coaches Theresa Grentz and Rene Portland. The team was featured for its 1970s accomplishments on a SportsCenter special on March 23, 2008.

On January 26, 1975, she played in the first nationally televised women's intercollegiate basketball game. Facing Maryland at Cole Field House, Immaculata won 80–48.

On February 22, 1975, she played in the first women's basketball game played in Madison Square Garden. Immaculata beat Queens College, 65–61.

The story of the basketball team was adapted into a movie, The Mighty Macs, which was released in 2011. The 1972–1974 teams were announced on April 7, 2014, as part of the 2014 induction class of the Naismith Memorial Basketball Hall of Fame, and were formally inducted as a team on August 8, 2014. In 2022, Stanley and Theresa Grentz were inducted into the Naismith Hall for their subsequent accomplishments as college coaches.

== Coaching career ==
Stanley began her coaching career as an assistant at Immaculata under her former coach Cathy Rush. Stanley's first head coaching position was at Old Dominion University for the Lady Monarchs in 1977–78. In her first season, they won the NWIT tournament. The Lady Monarchs went on to win the AIAW women's basketball tournament in 1979 and 1980. She took the 1984–85 team to the NCAA championship, finishing 31–3 overall and 6–0 in conference play.

Stanley left the position in 1987, taking the head coach position at Penn to be closer to family. She led the Quakers to a 11–41 record in two seasons.

She took the head coaching job at USC in 1989, coaching for four seasons and leading the Trojans to three NCAA Tournament berths, including an Elite Eight appearance in 1992. Her contract was not renewed after she had asked to be paid a salary comparable to George Raveling, then the head coach of the USC men's basketball team. She sued the university on the basis of sex discrimination, but her suit was dismissed.

After her exit at USC, she took a job as promotions director of the women's basketball program at Stanford. While head coach Tara VanDerveer left to coach the USA women's basketball team for a year, Stanley shared the interim co-head coaching job along with assistant Amy Tucker. Stanley and Tucker led the Cardinal to a 29–3 record, including unbeaten 18–0 conference mark. The Cardinal reached the Final Four, their fifth in seven seasons.

Following the season, Stanley was named the head coach at California. She resigned in 2000, after four seasons and a 35–75 record. While there, she was sued by a former assistant, who alleged Stanley gave her a choice between having an abortion and quitting her position, and also leaving her at a hotel during a recruiting trip. The university settled with the assistant for $115,000.

Stanley entered the WNBA as an assistant with the Los Angeles Sparks in 2000. She joined the Mystics in 2001, and was named head coach of the team in 2002. That year Stanley earned WNBA Coach of the Year honors, guiding the Mystics to the Eastern Conference finals. She was also inducted into the Women's Basketball Hall of Fame the same year.

Stanley resigned as head coach of the Mystics in January 2004, and joined the New York Liberty as an assistant coach later that year. She returned to the college coaching ranks in the fall of 2006 as an assistant to C. Vivian Stringer at Rutgers University. They guided the Scarlet Knights to the NCAA finals in 2007.

She re-entered the WNBA in 2008, leaving to join head coach Michael Cooper's staff with the Los Angeles Sparks as an assistant from 2008 through 2009, and rejoined the Mystics as an assistant coach in 2010, where she remained for ten seasons.

On November 27, 2019, Stanley was introduced as the head coach of the Indiana Fever. Stanley coached parts of three seasons with the team, amassing an 14–49 record before she was fired on May 25, 2022.

== Coaching Record ==
=== College ===
Record table
Season	Team	Overall	Conference	Standing	Postseason
Old Dominion Monarchs (Independent) (1977–1982)
1977–78	Old Dominion	30–4			NWIT Champions
1978–79	Old Dominion	35–1			AIAW Champions
1979–80	Old Dominion	37–1			AIAW Champions
1980–81	Old Dominion	28–7			AIAW 3rd Place
1981–82	Old Dominion	22–6			NCAA Sweet Sixteen
Old Dominion Monarchs (Sun Belt Conference) (1982–1987)
1982–83	Old Dominion	29–6		1st	NCAA Final Four
1983–84	Old Dominion	24–5		1st	NCAA Elite Eight
1984–85	Old Dominion	31–3	6–0	1st	NCAA Champions
1985–86	Old Dominion	15–13	5–1	2nd	
1986–87	Old Dominion	18–13	5–1	2nd	NCAA Sweet Sixteen
Old Dominion:		269–59 (.820)	16–2 (.889)		
Penn Quakers (Ivy League) (1987–1989)
1987–88	Penn	6–20	5–9	T–5th	
1988–89	Penn	5–21	3–11	7th	
Penn:		11–41 (.212)	8–20 (.286)		
USC Trojans (Pac-10 Conference) (1989–1993)
1989–90	USC	8–19	6–12	7th	
1990–91	USC	18–12	11–7	3rd	NCAA Second Round
1991–92	USC	23–8	14–4	2nd	NCAA Elite Eight
1992–93	USC	22–7	14–4	2nd	NCAA Sweet Sixteen
USC:		71–46 (.607)	45–27 (.625)		
Stanford Cardinal (Pac-10 Conference) (1995–1996)
1995–96	Stanford	29–3	18–0	1st	NCAA Final Four
Stanford:		29–3 (.906)	18–0 (1.000)		
California Golden Bears (Pac-10 Conference) (1996–2000)
1996–97	California	6–21	2–16	10th	
1997–98	California	6–21	2–16	T–9th	
1998–99	California	12–15	6–12	T–6th	
1999–2000	California	11–17	6–12	8th	
California:		35–75 (.318)	16–56 (.222)		
Total:		415–224 (.649)			
National champion Postseason invitational champion Conference regular season champion Conference regular season and conference tournament champion Division regular season champion Division regular season and conference tournament champion Conference tournament champion

=== WNBA ===
Legend
Regular season	G	Games coached	W	Games won	L	Games lost	W–L %	Win–loss %
Playoffs	PG	Playoff games	PW	Playoff wins	PL	Playoff losses	PW–L %	Playoff win–loss %

Team	Year	G	W	L	W–L%	Finish	PG	PW	PL	PW–L%	Result
WAS	2002	32	17	15	.531	3rd in East	5	3	2	.600	Lost in Conference finals
WAS	2003	34	9	25	.265	7th in East	-	-	-	-	Missed Playoffs
IND	2020	22	6	16	.273	5th in East	-	-	-	-	Missed Playoffs
IND	2021	32	6	26	.188	6th in East	-	-	-	-	Missed Playoffs
IND	2022	9	2	7	.222	(fired)	-	-	-	-	–
Career		129	40	89	.310		5	3	2	.600	
