= 2008 Pacific-10 Conference women's basketball tournament =

- Classification: Division I
- Teams: 10
- Site: HP Pavilion; San Jose, California
- Champions: Stanford Cardinal (17th title)
- Winning coach: Tara VanDerveer (17th title)
- MVP: Candice Wiggins (Stanford)
- Television: FSN
- Pacific-10 Conference women's basketball tournaments

2007–08 Pacific-10 Conference women's basketball standings
	Conf.				Overall
Team	W		L	PCT	W		L	PCT
No. 4 Stanford †	16	–	2	.889	35	–	4	.897
No. 10 California	15	–	3	.833	27	–	7	.794
Arizona State	14	–	4	.778	22	–	11	.667
USC	10	–	8	.556	17	–	13	.567
UCLA	10	–	8	.556	16	–	15	.516
Washington	8	–	10	.444	13	–	18	.419
Oregon	7	–	11	.389	14	–	17	.452
Oregon State	4	–	14	.222	12	–	19	.387
Arizona	4	–	14	.222	10	–	20	.333
Washington State	2	–	16	.111	5	–	25	.167
† 2008 Pac-10 Tournament winner Rankings from AP Poll

The 2008 State Farm Pacific-10 Conference Women's Basketball Tournament was a post-season tournament for the women's basketball teams in the Pacific-10 Conference. The games were held on Thursday through Sunday, March 7–10, 2008, at the HP Pavilion in San Jose, California. Stanford was the tournament champion and became the NCAA tournament automatic qualifier after defeating California in the championship game.

== Schedule ==
Date	Game	Matchup	Winner	Score	Time	TV
Thu., Mar. 7	1	#8 Seed (Oregon St.) vs. #9 Seed (Arizona)	Oregon State	46–31	6:00 PM	
Thu., Mar. 7	2	#7 Seed (Oregon) vs. #10 Seed (Washington State)	Oregon	66–45	8:15 PM	
Fri., Mar. 8	3	Seed #4 (USC) vs. Seed #5 (UCLA)	UCLA	73–52	11:00 AM	
Fri., Mar. 8	4	Seed #1 (No. 4 Stanford) vs. #8/#9 Winner (Oregon St.)	Stanford	64–41	1:15 PM	
Fri., Mar. 8	5	Seed #3 (Arizona State) vs. Seed #6 (Washington)	Arizona State	83–64	5:00 PM	
Fri., Mar. 8	6	Seed #2 (No. 8 California) vs. #7/#10 Winner (Oregon)	California	67–60	7:15 PM	
Sat., Mar. 9	7	Semifinal #1 (UCLA vs. No. 4 Stanford)	Stanford	78–45	2:30 PM	FSN
Sat., Mar. 9	8	Semifinal #2 (Arizona State vs. No. 8 California)	California	65–61	5:00 PM	FSN
Sun., Mar. 10	9	Championship Game (No. 4 Stanford vs. No. 8 California)	Stanford	56–35	3:00 PM	FSN

Rankings from AP Poll.

== Bracket ==
First Round; Thursday, March 7
8	Oregon State	46
9	Arizona	31
7	Oregon	66
10	Washington State	45

Quarterfinals; Friday, March 8 FSN
4	USC	52
5	UCLA	73
1	Stanford	64
8	Oregon State	41
2	California	67
7	Oregon	60
3	Arizona	83
6	Washington	64

Semifinals; Saturday, March 9 FSN
4	UCLA	45
1	Stanford	78
2	California	65
3	Arizona State	61

Championship Game; Sunday, March 10; FSN
1	Stanford	56
2	California	35

Note: * denotes overtime

== All-Tournament Team ==
Name	Pos.	Year	Team
Jayne Appel	C	So.	Stanford
Candice Wiggins	G	Sr.	Stanford

=== Most Outstanding Player ===
Name	Pos.	Year	Team
Candice Wiggins	G	Sr.	Stanford

This is the 4th time that the MOP of the Tournament was also the Pac-10's Player of the Year, and the second time Wiggins achieved the feat. Stanford's Nicole Powell (2002, 2004) and Wiggins (2005) were MOP and POY in the same season.

== Game notes ==
- Stanford made the NCAA field for the 21st consecutive season, and 22nd time overall.

== See also ==
- 2008 NCAA Women's Division I Basketball Tournament
