= Old Dominion Monarchs women's basketball =

College basketball team

2026–27 Old Dominion Monarchs women's basketball team
- University: Old Dominion University
- First season: 1969–70; 57 years ago
- Head coach: DeLisha Milton-Jones (7th season)
- Location: Norfolk, Virginia
- Arena: Chartway Arena (capacity: 8,472)
- Conference: Sun Belt
- Nickname: Monarchs (2013–present); Lady Monarchs (1969–2012)
- Colors: Slate blue, silver, and light blue
- All-time record: 1166–502

NCAA Division I tournament champions
- 1985
Other NCAA Division I tournament results
Runner-up	1997
Final Four	1983, 1985, 1997
Elite Eight	1983, 1984, 1985, 1997, 2002
Sweet Sixteen	1982, 1983, 1984, 1985, 1987, 1996, 1997, 1998, 1999, 2000, 2002, 2008
Appearances	1982, 1983, 1984, 1985, 1987, 1988, 1989, 1990, 1992, 1993, 1994, 1995, 1996, 1997, 1998, 1999, 2000, 2001, 2002, 2003, 2004, 2005, 2006, 2007, 2008

AIAW tournament champions
- 1979, 1980
Other AIAW tournament results
Final Four	1979, 1980, 1981
Quarterfinals	1979, 1980, 1981
Second round	1979, 1980, 1981
Appearances	1979, 1980, 1981

Conference tournament champions
- Sun Belt: 1983, 1984, 1985, 1987, 1990; CAA: 1992, 1993, 1994, 1995, 1996, 1997, 1998, 1999, 2000, 2001, 2002, 2003, 2004, 2005, 2006, 2007, 2008

Conference regular-season champions
- Sun Belt: 1983, 1984, 1985, 1987, 1988, 1989; CAA: 1992, 1993, 1994, 1995, 1996, 1997, 1998, 1999, 2000, 2001, 2002, 2003, 2004, 2006, 2007, 2008, 2010

Uniforms
Home	Away	Alternate

The Old Dominion Monarchs women's basketball team (formerly the Lady Monarchs) represents Old Dominion University in Norfolk, Virginia. The team currently competes in the NCAA Division I as a member of the Sun Belt Conference.

The ODU Monarchs women's basketball team contributed to the initial rise in popularity of women's intercollegiate basketball in the United States in the 1970s. Women's college basketball was organized under the auspices of the AIAW in the early 1970s, at a time when competitive power was distributed among small colleges that had established a niche (such as Immaculata, Delta State, West Chester State, Wayland Baptist and Stephen F. Austin).

ODU won two AIAW national championships in 1979 and 1980 in dominating fashion with star players, Nancy Lieberman and Anne Donovan. Led by Medina Dixon and Tracy Claxton, ODU won the NCAA Division I championship in their 1984–85 season, defeating the University of Georgia 70–65.

Old Dominion, along with UCLA and Tennessee, led the rise to prominence of large schools with national reputations to the top intercollegiate level, before the NCAA began sponsoring sports for women.

== Rivalries ==
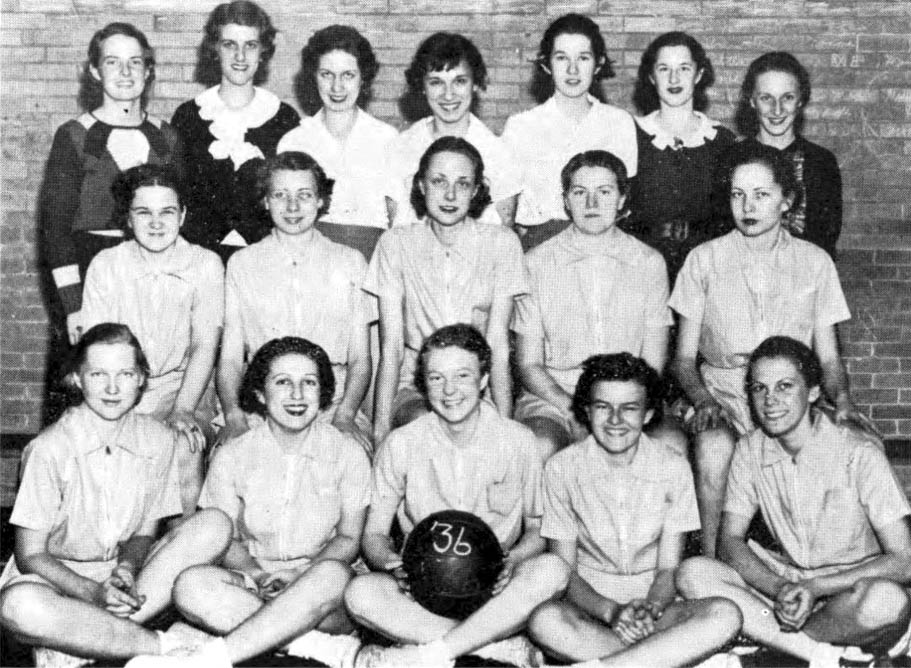
Old Dominion team of 1936

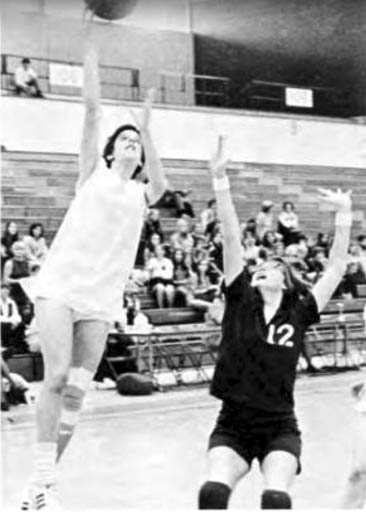
Old Dominion (in white) game in 1971

Old Dominion–James Madison: All-Time Record
Games played	First meeting	Last meeting	ODU wins	ODU losses	Win %
77	1969–70 (won 66–39)	February 28, 2013 (lost 61–77)	52	25	.675

Old Dominion–VCU: All-Time Record
Games played	First meeting	Last meeting	ODU wins	ODU losses	Win %
79	1969–70 (won 49–36)	November 21, 2021 (lost 48–71)	60	19	.759

Old Dominion–Virginia: All-Time Record
Games played	First meeting	Last meeting	ODU wins	ODU losses	Win %
35	1973–74 (lost 40–46)	November 24, 2019 (lost 53–56)	19	16	.543

Old Dominion–Virginia Tech: All-Time Record
Games played	First meeting	Last meeting	ODU wins	ODU losses	Win %
33	1972–73 (won 31–29)	November 25, 2014 (won 69–62)	25	8	.758

Old Dominion–William & Mary: All-Time Record
Games played	First meeting	Last meeting	ODU wins	ODU losses	Win %
68	1969–70 (won 62–22)	December 5, 2021 (won 68–55)	61	7	.897

== Postseason results ==
=== NCAA Division I ===
Old Dominion has reached the NCAA Division I women's basketball tournament 25 times. They have a record of 34–24.

Year	Seed	Round	Opponent	Result
1982	#1	First round Sweet Sixteen	#8 St. Peter's #4 Kansas State	W 75–42; L 67–76
1983	#2	First round Sweet Sixteen; Elite Eight; Final Four	#7 St. John's #3 Maryland #5 Penn State #1 Louisiana Tech	W 86–63; W 74–57; W 74–60; L 55–71
1984	#1	First round Sweet Sixteen; Elite Eight	#8 Penn State #4 NC State #3 Cheyney State	W 87–65; W 73-71 (OT); L 71–80
1985	#1	First round Sweet Sixteen; Elite Eight; Final Four; Title Game	#8 Syracuse #4 NC State #2 Ohio State #2 NE Louisiana #2 Georgia	W 88–63; W 77–67; W 72–68; W 57–47; W 70–65
1987	#5	Second round Sweet Sixteen	#4 North Carolina #1 Auburn	W 76–58; L 61–77
1988	#6	Second round	#3 Rutgers	L 78–88
1989	#6	First round Second round	#11 Villanova #3 Ole Miss	W 66–41; L 58–74
1990	#8	First round Second round	#9 St. Joseph's #1 Tennessee	W 91–69; L 68–87
1992	#10	First round	#7 North Carolina	L 54–60
1993	#7	First round Second round	#10 Tennessee Tech #2 Iowa	W 77–60; L 56–82
1994	#6	First round Second round	#11 St. Joseph's #3 North Carolina	W 56–55; L 52–63
1995	#8	First round	#9 FIU	L 76–81
1996	#2	First round Second round Sweet Sixteen	#15 Holy Cross #10 Toledo #3 Virginia	W 83–56; W 72–66; L 60–72
1997	#1	First round Second round Sweet Sixteen; Elite Eight; Final Four; Title Game	#16 Liberty #8 Purdue #4 LSU #3 Florida #1 Stanford #3 Tennessee	W 102–52; W 69–65; W 62–49; W 53–51; W 83–82; L 59–68
1998	#1	First round Second round Sweet Sixteen	#16 St. Francis (PA) #9 Nebraska #4 NC State	W 92–39; W 75–60; L 54–55
1999	#2	First round Second round Sweet Sixteen	#15 Tennessee Tech #10 Maine #3 Duke	W 74–48; W 72–62; L 63–76
2000	#4	First round Second round Sweet Sixteen	#13 Green Bay #12 SMU #1 Louisiana Tech	W 94–85; W 96–76; L 74–86
2001	#11	First round	#6 Washington	L 65–67
2002	#7	First round Second round Sweet Sixteen; Elite Eight	#10 Georgia #2 Purdue #3 Kansas State #1 Connecticut	W 68–54; W 74-70 (OT); W 82–62; L 64–85
2003	#12	First round	#5 Boston College	L 72–73
2004	#8	First round	#9 Marquette	L 64–67
2005	#11	First round	#6 Virginia	L 57–79
2006	#10	First round	#7 George Washington	L 72–87
2007	#7	First round	#10 Florida State	L 75–85
2008	#5	First round Second round Sweet Sixteen	#12 Liberty #4 Virginia #1 Connecticut	W 82–62; W 88-85 (OT); L 63–78

=== AIAW Division I ===
The Lady Monarchs made three appearances in the AIAW women's basketball tournament, with a combined record of 11–1.

Year	Round	Opponent	Result
1979	First round Quarterfinals; Semifinals; National Championship	Kansas State; Maryland; UCLA; Louisiana Tech	W, 96–75; W, 69–51; W, 87–82; W, 75–65
1980	First round Quarterfinals; Semifinals; National Championship	BYU; Rutgers; Louisiana Tech; Tennessee	W, 88–66; W, 84–62; W, 73–59; W, 68–53
1981	Second round Quarterfinals; Semifinals; Third-place game	Stephen F. Austin; Long Beach State; Tennessee; USC	W, 60–54; W, 76–60; L, 65–68; W, 68–65

== Home venues ==
Old Dominion play their home games at Chartway Arena. In the past, the team played at the Old Dominion University Fieldhouse from 1970 to 2002.

== Notable players ==
- Lucienne Berthieu
- Medina Dixon
- Anne Donovan (November 1, 1961 – June 13, 2018), coach and player at 6'8"
- Adrienne Goodson
- T. J. Jordan
- Nancy Lieberman (born 1958), WNBA Hall of Fame basketball player, general manager, and coach, Olympic silver medal
- Clarisse Machanguana
- Hamchétou Maïga
- Inge Nissen
- Ticha Penicheiro
- Mery Andrade
- Nyree Roberts
- Rhonda Rompola
- Kim Aston
- Jackie Kenney
- TJ Jones
- Kelly Lyons
- Celeste Hill

== Coaches ==
- Mary Jackson (1969–1973)
- Debbie Wilson (1973–1974)
- Pam Parsons (1974–1977)
- Marianne Stanley (1977–1987)
- Wendy Larry (1987–2011)
- Karen Barefoot (2011–2017)
- Nikki McCray-Penson (2017–2020)
- DeLisha Milton-Jones (2020–present)

== Seasons ==
Year	Coach	Overall	Conference	Standing	Postseason
Independent (1969–1982)
1969–70	Mary Jackson	16–2			
1970–71	Mary Jackson	8–7			
1971–72	Mary Jackson	12–7			
1972–73	Mary Jackson	7–9			
1973–74	Debbie Wilson	7–7			
1974–75	Pam Parsons	13–9			
1975–76	Pam Parsons	15–11			
1976–77	Pam Parsons	23–9			NWIT Semifinals
1977–78	Marianne Stanley	30–4			NWIT Champions
1978–79	Marianne Stanley	35–1			AIAW Champions
1979–80	Marianne Stanley	37–1			AIAW Champions
1980–81	Marianne Stanley	28–7			AIAW 3rd Place
1981–82	Marianne Stanley	22–6			NCAA Sweet 16
Sun Belt Conference (1982–1991)
1982–83	Marianne Stanley	29–6		1st	NCAA Final Four
1983–84	Marianne Stanley	24–5		1st	NCAA Elite Eight
1984–85	Marianne Stanley	31–3	6–0	1st	NCAA Champions
1985–86	Marianne Stanley	15–13	5–1	2nd	
1986–87	Marianne Stanley	18–13	5–1	2nd	NCAA Sweet 16
1987–88	Wendy Larry	17–12	6–0	1st	NCAA 2nd Round
1988–89	Wendy Larry	23–9	5–1	1st	NCAA 2nd Round
1989–90	Wendy Larry	21–10	4–2	2nd	NCAA 2nd Round
1990–91	Wendy Larry	5–21	2–4	5th	
Colonial Athletic Association (1991–2013)
1991–92	Wendy Larry	20–11	9–5	3rd	NCAA 1st Round
1992–93	Wendy Larry	22–8	14–0	1st	NCAA 2nd Round
1993–94	Wendy Larry	25–6	14–0	1st	NCAA 2nd Round
1994–95	Wendy Larry	27–6	13–1	T-1st	NCAA 1st Round
1995–96	Wendy Larry	29–3	16–0	1st	NCAA Sweet 16
1996–97	Wendy Larry	34–2	16–0	1st	NCAA Runner-up
1997–98	Wendy Larry	29–3	16–0	1st	NCAA Sweet 16
1998–99	Wendy Larry	28–4	16–0	1st	NCAA Sweet 16
1999–00	Wendy Larry	29–5	16–0	1st	NCAA Sweet 16
2000–01	Wendy Larry	21–9	15–1	1st	NCAA 1st Round
2001–02	Wendy Larry	28–6	18–0	1st	NCAA Elite Eight
2002–03	Wendy Larry	21–11	15–3	T-1st	NCAA 1st Round
2003–04	Wendy Larry	25–7	17–1	1st	NCAA 1st Round
2004–05	Wendy Larry	22–9	15–3	2nd	NCAA 1st Round
2005–06	Wendy Larry	22–9	17–1	1st	NCAA 1st Round
2006–07	Wendy Larry	24–9	17–1	1st	NCAA 1st Round
2007–08	Wendy Larry	31–5	17–1	1st	NCAA Sweet 16
2008–09	Wendy Larry	17–13	11–7	4th	
2009–10	Wendy Larry	19–14	14–4	1st	WNIT 2nd Round
2010–11	Wendy Larry	20–11	14–4	T-2nd	WNIT 1st Round
2011–12	Karen Barefoot	11–21	7–11	T-8th	
2012–13	Karen Barefoot	19–12	10–8	T-4th	WNIT 1st Round
Conference USA (2013–2022)
2013–14	Karen Barefoot	18–16	9–7	T-6th	WNIT 2nd Round
2014–15	Karen Barefoot	21–13	11–7	T-4th	WNIT 2nd Round
2015–16	Karen Barefoot	17–17	10–8	5th	
2016–17	Karen Barefoot	17–14	11–7	6th	
2017–18	Nikki McCray-Penson	8–23	6–10	T-10th	
2018–19	Nikki McCray-Penson	21–11	10–6	T-5th	WNIT 1st Round
2019–20	Nikki McCray-Penson	24–6	14–4	T-2nd	
2020–21	DeLisha Milton-Jones	13–11	7–9	6th East	
2021–22	DeLisha Milton-Jones	24–10	12–6	3rd East	WNIT 2nd Round
Sun Belt Conference (2022–present)
2022–23	DeLisha Milton-Jones	22–12	12–6	T-4th	
2023–24	DeLisha Milton-Jones	22–10	12–6	4th	WNIT 2nd Round
2024–25	DeLisha Milton-Jones	18–16	9–9	5th	WNIT 2nd Round
2025–26	DeLisha Milton-Jones	18–14	9–9	6th	
Total:		1202–527 (.695)			
National champion Postseason invitational champion Conference regular season champion Conference regular season and conference tournament champion Division regular season champion Division regular season and conference tournament champion Conference tournament champion

- Source: Old Dominion Athletics, Sun Belt Conference, Colonial Athletic Association

== See also ==
- 1984–85 Old Dominion Lady Monarchs basketball team
- 1985 NCAA Division I women's basketball tournament
- 1979 AIAW National Large College Basketball Championship
- 1980 AIAW National Division I Basketball Championship
- Sun Belt Conference women's basketball tournament
- Colonial Athletic Association women's basketball tournament
- Women's Basketball at ODU, Special Collections and University Archives Wiki, Old Dominion University Libraries
