= 1979 AIAW National Large College Basketball Championship =

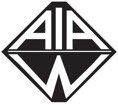

Tournament information
- Dates: March 16, 1979–March 25, 1979
- Administrator: Association for Intercollegiate Athletics for Women
- Venue(s): Greensboro, North Carolina
- Participants: 16

Final positions
- Champions: Old Dominion
- Runner-up: Louisiana Tech

Tournament statistics
- Matches played: 20

The 1979 AIAW (Association for Intercollegiate Athletics for Women) National Large College Basketball Championship was held on March 16–25, 1979. Sixteen teams were invited, and Old Dominion University was crowned national champion at the conclusion of the tournament.

The host site for the Final Four was Greensboro, North Carolina.

== Opening rounds ==
=== East Regional – The Bronx, NY ===
First Round; March 16, 1979
Rutgers	68
Tennessee	79
Long Beach State	52
Fordham	62

Quarterfinals; March 17, 1979
Tennessee	76
Fordham	54
Consolation
Rutgers	96
Long Beach State	84

=== Central Regional – Carbondale, IL ===
First Round; March 16, 1979
Louisiana Tech	100
Kansas	61
Northwestern	67
S. Connecticut St.	61

Quarterfinals; March 17, 1979
Louisiana Tech	88
Northwestern	52
Consolation
Kansas	86
S. Connecticut St.	71

=== South Regional – Cookeville, TN ===
First Round; March 16, 1979
Old Dominion	96
Kansas State	75
Maryland	73
Valdosta State	66

Quarterfinals; March 17, 1979
Old Dominion	69
Maryland	51
Consolation
Kansas State	92
Valdosta State	104

=== West Regional – Stanford, CA ===
First Round; March 16, 1979
Wayland Baptist	91
Brigham Young	67
UCLA	105
Oregon State	70

Quarterfinals; March 17, 1979
Wayland Baptist	73
UCLA	92
Consolation
Brigham Young	74
Oregon State	68

=== Final Four – Greensboro, NC ===
Semifinals; March 23, 1979
Tennessee	84
Louisiana Tech	102
Old Dominion	87
UCLA	82

Final; March 25, 1979
Louisiana Tech	65
Old Dominion	75
Third place
Tennessee	104
UCLA	86

== See also ==
- 1979 AIAW National Small College Basketball Championship
