= Amy Tucker (basketball) =

American basketball player and coach

Career information
- College: Ohio State (1978–1982)

Career history

Coaching
- Ohio State (graduate asst.)
- Ohio State (asst.)
- Stanford (asst.)
- Stanford (AHC)
- Stanford (interim HC)
- Stanford (AHC)

Career highlights
- NCAA Regional—Final Four (1996)

Amy Tucker is the former associate head coach of the Stanford Cardinal women's basketball team under Tara VanDerveer, and served as interim co-coach during the 1995–96 season.

Tucker played at Ohio State from 1978 to 1982, the last two years under VanDerveer. She joined VanDerveer's staff as a graduate assistant in 1983, becoming a full assistant the next season. She followed VanDerveer to Stanford as assistant coach in 1985, and was promoted to associate head coach in 1990. When VanDerveer left Stanford to coach the women's national team at the 1996 Summer Olympics, Tucker served as co-head coach with Marianne Stanley, and helped lead the Cardinal to their fifth Final Four of the 1990s. When VanDerveer returned for the 1996–97 season, Tucker resumed her role as associate head coach, which she held until April 2017, when she retired.

Tucker was on hand for 10 Final Fours and two national championships. She was considered to be one of the best recruiters in women's college basketball during her time as Stanford's recruiting coordinator.
