= George Washington Revolutionaries women's basketball =

George Washington Revolutionaries
2026–27 George Washington Revolutionaries women's basketball team
- University: George Washington University
- Head coach: Ganiyat Adeduntan (2nd season)
- Location: Washington, D.C., U.S.
- Arena: Charles E. Smith Center (capacity: 5,000)
- Conference: Atlantic 10
- Nickname: Revolutionaries
- Colors: Buff and blue
- Student section: George's Army

NCAA Division I tournament Elite Eight
- 1997
Other NCAA Division I tournament results
Sweet Sixteen	1995, 1997, 2007, 2008
Appearances	1991, 1992, 1994, 1995, 1996, 1997, 1998, 2000, 2001, 2003, 2004, 2005, 2006, 2007, 2008, 2015, 2016, 2018

Conference tournament champions
- 1992, 1995, 1996, 2003, 2015, 2016, 2018

Conference regular-season champions
- 1994, 1995, 1996, 1997, 1998, 2000 (West), 2002, 2003, 2004 (West), 2005 (West), 2006, 2007, 2008, 2015, 2016

Uniforms
Home	Away	Alternate

The George Washington Revolutionaries women's basketball team represents George Washington University, located in Washington, D.C. It plays its home games in the Charles E. Smith Center, which is also the venue for other George Washington Revolutionaries athletic programs. The team competes in the Atlantic 10 Conference.

== History ==
George Washington began play in 1975. They joined the Atlantic 10 Conference in 1983. Since joining the conference, they have won the regular season title 16 times, winning it in 1994 (shared), 1995, 1996, 1997, 1998, 2000 (West), 2002, 2003, 2004 (West), 2005 (West), 2006 (shared), 2007, 2008 (shared), 2015, 2016, and 2017 (shared). They have also won the A-10 Tournament in 1992, 1995, 1996, 2003, 2015, 2016, and 2018. In 1997, the Colonials made their four straight NCAA Tournament appearance and sixth in seven years. In the ensuing tournament, the Colonials (ranked as a 5 seed) went all the way to the Elite Eight. They beat Northwestern 61–46, Tulane 81–67, and North Carolina 55–46 before losing to Notre Dame 62–52 in the regional final. As of the end of the 2015–16 season, the Colonials have an all-time record of 748–448.

== NCAA tournament results ==
George Washington has appeared in the NCAA Division I women's basketball tournament eighteen times. They have a record of 18–18.

Year	Seed	Round	Opponent	Result
1991	#10	First Round; Second Round	#7 Richmond #2 NC State	W 73–62; L 83–94
1992	#8	First Round; Second Round	#9 Vermont #1 Virginia	W 70–69; L 58–97
1994	#7	First Round; Second Round	#10 UAB #2 Southern Cal	W 74–66; L 72–76
1995	#4	First Round; Second Round; Sweet Sixteen	#13 DePaul #5 Drake #1 Colorado	W 87–79; W 96–93 (OT); L 61–77
1996	#6	First Round; Second Round	#11 Maine #3 Virginia	W 83–67; L 43–62
1997	#5	First Round; Second Round; Sweet Sixteen; Elite Eight	#12 Northwestern #4 Tulane #1 North Carolina #6 Notre Dame	W 61–46; W 81–67; W 55–46; L 52–62
1998	#10	First Round; Second Round	#7 Georgia #2 Connecticut	W 74–72; L 67–75
2000	#7	First Round; Second Round	#10 UCLA #2 Notre Dame	W 79–72; L 60–95
2001	#7	First Round	#10 Stanford	L 51–76
2003	#7	First Round; Second Round	#10 Oklahoma #2 Villanova	W 71–61; L 57–70
2004	#8	First Round	#9 DePaul	L 46–83
2005	#9	First Round; Second Round	#8 Ole Miss #1 North Carolina	W 60–57; L 47–71
2006	#7	First Round; Second Round	#10 Old Dominion #2 Tennessee	W 87–72; L 53–66
2007	#4	First Round; Second Round; Sweet Sixteen	#12 Boise State #4 Texas A&M #1 North Carolina	W 76–67; W 59–47; L 56–70
2008	#6	First Round; Second Round; Sweet Sixteen	#11 Auburn #3 California #2 Rutgers	W 66–56; W 55–53; L 42–53
2015	#6	First Round	#11 Gonzaga	L 69–82
2016	#8	First Round	#9 Kansas State	L 51–56
2018	#14	First Round	#3 Ohio State	L 45–87
