= 1997 NCAA Division I women's basketball tournament =

American college basketball tournament

- Teams: 64
- Finals site: Riverfront Coliseum, Cincinnati, Ohio
- Champions: Tennessee Volunteers (5th title, 7th title game, 10th Final Four)
- Runner-up: Old Dominion Monarchs (2nd title game, 3rd Final Four)
- Semifinalists: Stanford Cardinal (6th Final Four); Notre Dame Fighting Irish (1st Final Four)
- Winning coach: Pat Summitt (5th title)
- MOP: Chamique Holdsclaw (Tennessee)

The 1997 NCAA Division I women's basketball tournament began on March 14, 1997, and concluded on March 30, 1997, when Tennessee won the national title. The Final Four was held at Riverfront Coliseum in Cincinnati on March 28–30, 1997. Tennessee, Old Dominion, Stanford, and Notre Dame qualified for the Final Four. Tennessee and Old Dominion won their semi-final Final Four matchups and continued on to the championship. Tennessee defeated Old Dominion 68–59 for their fifth national title.

== Tournament records ==
- Field goal percentage – Kristin Folkl, Stanford, hit all eight field goal attempts in the semi-final game against Old Dominion, setting the record for field goal percentage in a Final Four game.
- Assists – Kellie Jolly, Tennessee, recorded eleven assists in the championship game against Old Dominion, setting the record for most assists in a Final Four game.
- Field goal percentage – Tennessee hit 29 of 49 field goals attempts (59.2%) in the championship game against Old Dominion, setting the record for the field goal percentage in a Final Four game.

== Qualifying teams – automatic ==
Sixty-four teams were selected to participate in the 1997 NCAA Tournament. Thirty conferences were eligible for an automatic bid to the 1997 NCAA tournament.

Automatic bids
		Record		
Qualifying School	Conference	Regular Season	Conference	Seed
Auburn University	SEC	21–9	5–7	7
University of Colorado at Boulder	Big 12	21–8	12–4	2
University of Connecticut	Big East	30–0	18–0	1
University of Detroit Mercy	Midwestern Collegiate	23–6	14–2	14
Drake University	Missouri Valley Conference	23–7	14–4	13
Eastern Kentucky University	Ohio Valley Conference	24–5	16–2	15
Florida International University	Trans America	21–8	12–4	14
Grambling State University	SWAC	24–5	14–0	14
Harvard University	Ivy League	20–6	14–0	16
Howard University	MEAC	24–5	18–0	16
University of Iowa	Big Ten	17–11	9–7	9
Lehigh University	Patriot League	15–14	7–5	16
Liberty University	Big South Conference	22–7	9–5	16
Louisiana Tech University	Sun Belt Conference	29–3	12–2	2
University of Maine	America East	22–7	17–1	13
Marshall University	Southern Conference	18–11	9–5	15
University of Montana	Big Sky Conference	25–3	16–0	9
University of North Carolina at Chapel Hill	ACC	27–2	15–1	1
Old Dominion University	Colonial	29–1	16–0	1
San Diego State University	WAC	23–6	15–1	11
University of San Francisco	West Coast Conference	25–5	11–3	11
St. Francis (PA)	Northeast Conference	19–10	16–2	15
Saint Joseph's University	Atlantic 10	25–4	15–1	7
Saint Peter's College	MAAC	25–3	14–0	15
Stanford University	Pac-10	30–1	18–0	1
Texas State University	Southland	17–11	11–5	14
University of Toledo	MAC	27–3	16–2	10
Troy University	Mid-Continent	23–6	13–3	13
Tulane University	Conference USA	26–4	12–2	4
University of California, Santa Barbara	Big West Conference	24–5	14–1	13

== Qualifying teams – at-large ==
Thirty-four additional teams were selected to complete the sixty-four invitations.

At-large Bids
		Record		
Qualifying School	Conference	Regular Season	Conference	Seed
University of Alabama	Southeastern	23–6	10–2	2
University of Arizona	Pacific-10	22–7	12–6	7
Clemson University	Atlantic Coast	19–10	8–8	5
DePaul University	Conference USA	20–8	10–4	12
Duke University	Atlantic Coast	18–10	9–7	5
University of Florida	Southeastern	21–8	9–3	3
The George Washington University	Atlantic 10	25–5	16–0	5
University of Georgia	Southeastern	22–5	11–1	2
University of Illinois at Urbana–Champaign	Big Ten	22–7	12–4	4
Iowa State University	Big 12	17–11	9–7	12
University of Kansas	Big 12	24–5	14–2	3
Kansas State University	Big 12	19–11	9–7	10
University of Louisville	Conference USA	20–8	12–2	10
Louisiana State University	Southeastern	23–4	9–3	4
Marquette University	Conference USA	20–9	10–4	12
University of Maryland, College Park	Atlantic Coast	18–9	9–7	9
University of Memphis	Conference USA	22–6	12–2	11
Michigan State University	Big Ten	21–7	12–4	8
North Carolina State University	Atlantic Coast	19–11	9–7	8
Northwestern University	Big Ten	17–10	9–7	12
University of Notre Dame	Big East	27–6	17–1	6
University of Oregon	Pacific-10	21–6	14–4	6
University of Portland	West Coast	27–2	14–0	9
Purdue University	Big Ten	16–10	12–4	8
University of Southern California	Pacific-10	18–9	13–5	6
Stephen F. Austin State University	Southland	27–4	16–0	7
University of Tennessee	Southeastern	23–10	8–4	3
University of Texas at Austin	Big 12	21–7	12–4	3
Texas Tech University	Big 12	19–8	11–5	8
University of Utah	Western Athletic	24–5	15–1	5
Vanderbilt University	Southeastern	18–10	6–6	6
University of Virginia	Atlantic Coast	21–7	12–4	4
University of Washington	Pacific-10	17–11	12–6	11
Western Kentucky University	Sun Belt	22–8	12–2	10

== Bids by conference ==
Thirty conferences earned an automatic bid. In eighteen cases, the automatic bid was the only representative from the conference. Thirty-four additional at-large teams were selected from twelve of the conferences.

Bids	Conference	Teams
7	Southeastern	Auburn, Alabama, Florida, Georgia, LSU, Tennessee, Vanderbilt
6	Atlantic Coast	North Carolina, Clemson, Duke, Maryland, North Carolina St., Virginia
6	Big 12	Colorado, Iowa St., Kansas, Kansas St., Texas, Texas Tech
5	Big Ten	Iowa, Illinois, Michigan St., Northwestern, Purdue
5	Conference USA	Tulane, DePaul, Louisville, Marquette, Memphis
5	Pacific-10	Stanford, Arizona, Oregon, Southern California, Washington
2	Atlantic 10	St. Joseph's, George Washington
2	Big East	Connecticut, Notre Dame
2	Southland	Texas St., Stephen F. Austin
2	Sun Belt	Louisiana Tech, Western Kentucky
2	West Coast	San Francisco, Portland
2	Western Athletic	San Diego St., Utah
1	America East	Maine
1	Big Sky	Montana
1	Big South	Liberty
1	Big West	UC Santa Barb.
1	Colonial	Old Dominion
1	Ivy	Harvard
1	Metro Atlantic	St. Peter's
1	Mid-American	Toledo
1	Mid-Continent	Troy
1	Mid-Eastern	Howard
1	Midwestern	Detroit
1	Missouri Valley	Drake
1	Northeast	St. Francis (PA)
1	Ohio Valley	Eastern Kentucky
1	Patriot	Lehigh
1	Southern	Marshall
1	Southwestern	Grambling State
1	Trans America	FIU

== First and second rounds ==
1997 NCAA NCAA first and second round venues

In 1997, the field remained at 64 teams. The teams were seeded, and assigned to four geographic regions, with seeds 1–16 in each region. In Round 1, seeds 1 and 16 faced each other, as well as seeds 2 and 15, seeds 3 and 14, seeds 4 and 13, seeds 5 and 12, seeds 6 and 11, seeds 7 and 10, and seeds 8 and 9. In the first two rounds, the top four seeds were given the opportunity to host the first-round game. In most cases, the higher seed accepted the opportunity. The exception:

- Fourth seeded Tulane was unable to host due to a "facility/hotel availability conflict", so fifth seeded George Washington hosted three first and second-round games

Michigan State was involved in two overtime games, winning in the first round against Portland then losing in overtime in the second round against North Carolina. Old Dominion was also involved in two overtime games, winning in the second round against Purdue, then winning in the national semifinal game against Stanford.

The following table lists the region, host school, venue and the sixteen first and second round locations:

Region	Rnd	Host	Venue	City	State
East	1&2	University of North Carolina	Carmichael Auditorium	Chapel Hill	North Carolina
East	1&2	University of Texas	Frank Erwin Center	Austin	Texas
East	1&2	University of Alabama	Coleman Coliseum	Tuscaloosa	Alabama
East	1&2	George Washington University	Charles E. Smith Athletic Center	Washington	District of Columbia
Mideast	1&2	Louisiana State University	LSU Assembly Center (Pete Maravich Assembly Center)	Baton Rouge	Louisiana
Mideast	1&2	Old Dominion University	Old Dominion University Fieldhouse	Norfolk	Virginia
Mideast	1&2	Louisiana Tech University	Thomas Assembly Center	Ruston	Louisiana
Mideast	1&2	University of Florida	O'Connell Center	Gainesville	Florida
Midwest	1&2	University of Tennessee	Thompson–Boling Arena	Knoxville	Tennessee
Midwest	1&2	University of Colorado	CU Events Center (Coors Events Center)	Boulder	Colorado
Midwest	1&2	University of Connecticut	Harry A. Gampel Pavilion	Storrs	Connecticut
Midwest	1&2	University of Illinois	Assembly Hall (Champaign)	Champaign	Illinois
West	1&2	University of Georgia	Georgia Coliseum (Stegeman Coliseum)	Athens	Georgia
West	1&2	University of Virginia	University Hall (University of Virginia)	Charlottesville	Virginia
West	1&2	Stanford University	Maples Pavilion	Stanford	California
West	1&2	University of Kansas	Allen Field House	Lawrence	Kansas

== Regionals and Final Four ==
1997 NCAA regionals and Final Four

The Regionals, named for the general location, were held from March 22 to March 24 at these sites:

- East Regional Carolina Coliseum, Columbia, South Carolina (Host: University of South Carolina)
- Mideast Regional Mackey Arena, West Lafayette, Indiana (Host: Purdue University)
- Midwest Regional Carver–Hawkeye Arena, Iowa City, Iowa (Host: University of Iowa)
- West Regional Dahlberg Arena, Missoula, Montana (Host: University of Montana)

Each regional winner advanced to the Final Four held March 28 and March 30 in Cincinnati at the Riverfront Coliseum

== Bids by state ==
The sixty-four teams came from thirty-two states, plus Washington, D.C. California had the most teams with five bids. Eighteen states did not have any teams receiving bids.

NCAA Women's basketball Tournament invitations by state 1997

Bids	State	Teams
5	California	San Diego St., San Francisco, Stanford, UC Santa Barb., Southern California
4	Louisiana	Grambling, Louisiana Tech, Tulane, LSU
4	Texas	Texas St., Stephen F. Austin, Texas, Texas Tech
3	Alabama	Auburn, Troy, Alabama
3	Illinois	DePaul, Illinois, Northwestern
3	Iowa	Drake, Iowa, Iowa St.
3	Kentucky	Eastern Kentucky, Louisville, Western Kentuck.
3	North Carolina	North Carolina, Duke, North Carolina St.
3	Tennessee	Memphis, Tennessee, Vanderbilt
3	Virginia	Liberty, Old Dominion, Virginia
2	District of Columbia	Howard, George Washington
2	Florida	FIU, Florida
2	Indiana	Notre Dame, Purdue
2	Kansas	Kansas, Kansas St.
2	Michigan	Detroit, Michigan St.
2	Oregon	Oregon, Portland
3	Pennsylvania	Lehigh, St. Joseph's, St Francis
1	Arizona	Arizona
1	Colorado	Colorado
1	Connecticut	Connecticut
1	Georgia	Georgia
1	Maine	Maine
1	Maryland	Maryland
1	Massachusetts	Harvard
1	Montana	Montana
1	New Jersey	St. Peter's
1	Ohio	Toledo
1	South Carolina	Clemson
1	Utah	Utah
1	Washington	Washington
1	West Virginia	Marshall
1	Wisconsin	Marquette

== Brackets ==
Data source

* – Denotes overtime period

=== East Region ===
First round
March 14 and 15

Higher Seed's Home Court

Second round
March 16 and 17

Higher Seed's Home Court

Regional semifinals
March 22

Carolina Coliseum

Columbia, South Carolina

Regional finals
March 24

Carolina Coliseum

Columbia, South Carolina

1
at North Carolina
78

16
Harvard
53

1
North Carolina
81^{OT}

8
Michigan State
71

8
Michigan State
75^{OT}

9
Portland
70

1
North Carolina
46

5
George Washington
55

5
at George Washington†
61

12
Northwestern
46

5
George Washington†
81

4
Tulane
67

4
Tulane
72

13
UCSB
69

5
George Washington
52

6
Notre Dame
62

6
Notre Dame
93

11
Memphis
62

6
Notre Dame
86

3
Texas
83

3
at Texas
66

14
SW Texas State
38

6
Notre Dame
87

2
Alabama
71

7
Saint Joseph's
70

10
Kansas State
52

7
Saint Joseph's
52

2
Alabama
61

2
at Alabama
94

15
Saint Francis
50

† George Washington was a host as a #5 seed, as #4 seed Tulane's facility was considered inadequate by the NCAA.

=== Mideast Region ===
First round
March 14 and 15

Higher Seed's Home Court

Second round
March 16 and 17

Higher Seed's Home Court

Regional semifinals
March 22

Mackey Arena

West Lafayette, Indiana

Regional finals
March 24

Mackey Arena

West lafayette, Indiana

1
at Old Dominion
102

16
Liberty
52

1
Old Dominion
69^{OT}

8
Purdue
65

8
Purdue
74

9
Maryland
48

1
Old Dominion
62

4
LSU
49

5
Clemson
66

12
Marquette
70

12
Marquette
58

4
LSU
71

4
at LSU
88

13
Maine
79

1
Old Dominion
53

3
Florida
51

6
USC
68

11
San Francisco
55

6
USC
78

3
Florida
92

3
at Florida
92

14
Florida International
68

3
Florida
71

2
Louisiana Tech
57

7
Auburn
68

10
Louisville
65

7
Auburn
48

2
Louisiana Tech
74

2
at Louisiana Tech
94

15
Saint Peter's
50

=== Midwest Region ===
First round
March 14 and 15

Higher Seed's Home Court

Second round
March 16 and 17

Higher Seed's Home Court

Regional semifinals
March 22

Carver–Hawkeye Arena

Iowa City, Iowa

Regional finals
March 24

Carver–Hawkeye Arena

Iowa City, Iowa

1
at Connecticut
103

16
Lehigh
35

1
Connecticut
72

9
Iowa
53

8
North Carolina State
50

9
Iowa
56

1
Connecticut
78

4
Illinois
73

5
Duke
70

12
DePaul
56

5
Duke
67

4
Illinois
85

4
at Illinois
79

13
Drake
62

1
Connecticut
81

3
Tennessee
91

6
Oregon
80

11
San Diego State
68

6
Oregon
59

3
Tennessee
76

3
at Tennessee
91

14
Grambling State
54

3
Tennessee
75

2
Colorado
67

7
Stephen F. Austin
79

10
Toledo
66

7
Stephen F. Austin
57

2
Colorado
66

2
at Colorado
69

15
Marshall
49

=== West Region ===
First round
March 14 and 15

Higher Seed's Home Court

Second round
March 16 and 17

Higher Seed's Home Court

Regional semifinals
March 22

Dahlberg Arena

Missoula, Montana

Regional finals
March 24

Dahlberg Arena

Missoula, Montana

1
at Stanford
111

16
Howard
59

1
Stanford
67

8
Texas Tech
45

8
Texas Tech
47

9
Montana
45

1
Stanford
91

4
Virginia
69

5
Utah
66

12
Iowa State
57

5
Utah
46

4
Virginia
65

4
at Virginia
96

13
Troy State
74

1
Stanford
82

2
Georgia
47

6
Vanderbilt
74

11
Washington
62

6
Vanderbilt
51

3
Kansas
44

3
at Kansas
81

14
Detroit
67

6
Vanderbilt
52

2
Georgia
66

7
Arizona
76

10
Western Kentucky
54

7
Arizona
74

2
Georgia
80

2
at Georgia
91

15
Eastern Kentucky
55

=== Final Four ===
National semifinals
March 28

Riverfront Coliseum

Cincinnati

National championship
March 30

Riverfront Coliseum

Cincinnati

E6
Notre Dame
66

MW3
Tennessee
80

MW3
Tennessee
68

ME1
Old Dominion
59

ME1
Old Dominion
83^{OT}

W1
Stanford
82

E-East; ME-Mideast; MW-Midwest; W-West.

== Record by conference ==
Thirteen conferences had more than one bid, or at least one win in NCAA Tournament play:

Conference	# of Bids	Record	Win %	Round of 32	Sweet Sixteen	Elite Eight	Final Four	Championship Game
Southeastern	7	19–6	.760	7	6	3	1	1
Atlantic Coast	6	5–6	.455	3	2	–	–	–
Big 12	6	5–6	.455	4	1	–	–	–
Pacific-10	5	7–5	.583	4	1	1	1	–
Big Ten	5	5–5	.500	4	1	–	–	–
Conference USA	5	2–5	.286	2	–	–	–	–
Big East	2	7–2	.778	2	2	2	1	–
Atlantic 10	2	4–2	.667	2	1	1	–	–
Sun Belt	2	2–2	.500	1	1	–	–	–
Southland	2	1–2	.333	1	–	–	–	–
Western Athletic	2	1–2	.333	1	–	–	–	–
West Coast	2	0–2	–	–	–	–	–	–
Colonial	1	5–1	.833	1	1	1	1	1

Seventeen conferences went 0-1: America East, Big Sky Conference, Big South Conference, Big West Conference, Ivy League, MAAC, MAC, Mid-Continent, MEAC, Midwestern Collegiate, Missouri Valley Conference, Northeast Conference, Ohio Valley Conference, Patriot League, Southern Conference, SWAC, and Trans America

== All-Tournament team ==
- Chamique Holdsclaw, Tennessee
- Kellie Jolly, Tennessee
- Ticha Penicheiro, Old Dominion
- Nyree Roberts, Old Dominion
- Clarisse Machanguana, Old Dominion

== Game officials ==
- Sally Bell (semifinal)
- Carla Fujimoto (semifinal)
- Ray Bomeli (semifinal)
- John Morningstar (semifinal)
- Scott Yarbrough (semifinal)
- Judy Schneider (semifinal)
- Yvette McKinney (final)
- Dee Kantner (final)
- Violet Palmer (final)

Dee Kantner and Violet Palmer were hired into the NBA for its 1997-98 season, becoming the first female officials in any major North American professional sports league. Following her dismissal from the NBA in 2001, Kantner returned to women's college basketball and has officiated numerous Final Fours, while Palmer remained in the NBA through the 2015-16 season.

== See also ==
- 1997 NCAA Division I men's basketball tournament
- 1997 NCAA Division II women's basketball tournament
- 1997 NCAA Division III women's basketball tournament
- 1997 NAIA Division I women's basketball tournament
