= 1991 NCAA Division I women's basketball championship game =

Women's basketball championship game

NCAA Division I women's basketball championship game
National championship game
Virginia Cavaliers	Tennessee Lady Volunteers
(31–2)	(29–5)
67	70
Head coach: Debbie Ryan	Head coach: Pat Summitt
- AP: 2
- Coaches: 2
- AP: 4
- Coaches: 3
	1st half	2nd half	OT	Total
Virginia Cavaliers	26	34	7	67
Tennessee Lady Volunteers	27	33	10	70
- Date: March 31, 1991
- Venue: Lakefront Arena, New Orleans, Louisiana
- MVP: Dawn Staley, Virginia
- Referees: Patty Broderick and Lou Pitt

United States TV coverage
- Network: CBS
- Announcers: Brad Nessler (play-by-play) and Mimi Griffin (analyst)

The 1991 NCAA Division I women's basketball championship game was the final game of the 1991 NCAA Division I women's basketball tournament. It determined the champion of the 1990–91 NCAA Division I women's basketball season and was contested by the Virginia Cavaliers and the Tennessee Lady Volunteers. The game was played on March 31, 1991, at Lakefront Arena in New Orleans, Louisiana. After leading 27–26 at halftime, No. 4 Tennessee needed an overtime period to defeat No. 2 Virginia 70–67 to capture the NCAA national championship, and bring home the third NCAA championship in program history. Despite the runner-up finish, Virginia's Dawn Staley was named the tournament's Most Outstanding Player (MOP). Staley is the only women's player to be named MOP while not playing for the championship team.

== Participants ==
=== Virginia Cavaliers ===
The Cavaliers, representing the University of Virginia in Charlottesville, Virginia, were led by head coach Debbie Ryan in her 14th season at the school. Virginia began the season ranked No. 1 in the AP Poll. The team lost just one regular season game, and swept through the ACC regular season (14–0) before losing to Clemson in the ACC tournament semifinals. The Cavaliers finished No. 2 in the final AP poll, a spot they never fell below throughout the duration of the season.

Entering the NCAA tournament at 27–2, Virginia held the No. 1 seed in the Midwest region. They defeated No. 8 seed Stephen F. Austin, No. 5 seed Oklahoma State, and No. 10 seed Lamar to reach the Final Four for the second straight season. In the National semifinals, the Lady Cavs defeated the No. 3 seed from the East region, UConn, 61–55.

=== Tennessee Lady Volunteers ===
The Lady Vols, who represented the University of Tennessee in Knoxville, Tennessee, were led by head coach Pat Summitt in her 17th season at the school. Tennessee opened the season ranked No. 6 in the AP poll, and peaked at No. 2 midway through the season before finishing with the No. 4 ranking ahead of the championship game. The Lady Volunteers finished third in the SEC with a 6–3 conference record.

In the NCAA tournament, Tennessee played as the No.1 seed in the Mideast region. They defeated No. 8 seed SW Missouri State, No. 4 seed Western Kentucky, and No. 3 seed Auburn to reach the NCAA Final Four for the 7th time in program history. They won 68–60 over the West region's No. 2 seed Stanford in the national semifinal to reach the national championship game with a 29–5 record.

== Starting lineups ==
Virginia	Position	Tennessee
Dawn Staley	G	Dena Head
Tammi Reiss	G	Jody Adams
Heather Burge	C	Daedra Charles
Tonya Cardoza	F	Lisa Harrison
Melanee Wagener	F	Kelli Casteel

== Game summary ==
CBS

March 31, 1991

No. 2 Virginia Cavaliers 67, No. 4 Tennessee Volunteers 70 (OT)
Scoring by half: 26–27, 34–33 Overtime: 7–10
Pts: Staley 28; Rebs: Staley, Burge 11; Asts: Staley 6	Pts: Head 28; Rebs: Harrison 13; Asts: Head, Caldwell 3

Lakefront Arena – New Orleans, Louisiana
Referees: Patty Broderick and Lou Pitt

== Media coverage ==
The game was broadcast on CBS with Brad Nessler on play-by-play duties and Mimi Griffin as the color analyst.
