= 1990–91 Lamar Lady Cardinals basketball team =

Intercollegiate basketball season

1990–91 Lamar Cardinals women's basketball

American South regular season

1991 NCAA Division I women's basketball tournament, Elite Eight
- Conference: American South Conference
- Record: 29–4* (12–0* American South)
- Head coach: Al Barbre (5th season)
- Home arena: Montagne Center (Capacity 10,080)

The 1990–91 Lamar Cardinals basketball team represented Lamar University during the 1990–91 NCAA Division I women's basketball season. The Lady Cardinals were led by fifth-year head coach Al Barbre. The team played their home games at the Montagne Center in Beaumont, Texas and were members of the American South Conference. The Lady Cardinals finished the season with a 29–4 overall and a 12–0 conference record. The team qualified for the 1991 NCAA Division I women's basketball tournament winning games against Texas, LSU, and Arkansas. The team lost to eventual tournament championship game participant, Virginia in the Elite Eight.

== After the season and probation ==
Al Barbe was named American South Conference Coach of the Year and Converse District VI Coach of the Year. Brenda Hackett and Urannah Jackson were named as American South Conference First Team players.

Following an NCAA investigation, all wins for the season were vacated due to violations by the program. In addition, the program was placed on two years' probation and the number of allowed scholarships was reduced during the probation period. Al Barbre resigned as head coach.

== Roster ==
1990–91 Lamar Lady Cardinals women's basketball team
Players
Coaches

Pos.	#	Name	Height	Year	Hometown
G		Brenda Hatchett	5 ft 0 in (1.52 m)	So
F		Barbara Hickey	6 ft 0 in (1.83 m)	Jr
C		Urrannah Jackson	6 ft 2 in (1.88 m)	Jr
F		Tracie Mosley	6 ft 0 in (1.83 m)	Jr
F		Bobbie Bean	6 ft 0 in (1.83 m)	Jr
G		Ramona Jones	5 ft 5 in (1.65 m)	So
F		Jojuana Rogers	6 ft 0 in (1.83 m)	Jr
G		Renee Island	5 ft 8 in (1.73 m)	Jr
F		Katrenia Oston	6 ft 0 in (1.83 m)	Sr
G		Kelly Guerrant	5 ft 6 in (1.68 m)	Sr
G		Sondra Ancelot	5 ft 6 in (1.68 m)	Fr
C		Dana Woods	6 ft 2 in (1.88 m)	Sr
F		Angie Wilson	6 ft 2 in (1.88 m)	Jr

Head coach

Al Barbre

Assistant coach(es)

Legend

- (C) Team captain
- (S) Suspended
- (I) Ineligible
- (W) Walk-on
- Injured
- Current redshirt

Roster

== Schedule and results ==
Date time, TV	Rank^{#}	Opponent^{#}	Result	Record	Site (attendance) city, state
Regular season
November 23, 1990*		vs. Virginia Tech; Florida International Classic	W 71–54	1–0	Golden Panther Arena (100); Miami, FL
November 24, 1990*		at Florida International; Florida International Classic	W 98–72	2–0	Golden Panther Arena (150); Miami, FL
November 26, 1990*		at Memphis State	W 81–71	3–0	Elma Roane Fieldhouse (535); Memphis, TN
November 30, 1990*		vs. Southern Mississippi; SFA/Ladyjack Dial Classic	W 74–66	4–0	William R. Johnson Coliseum (1,171); Nacogdoches, TX
December 1, 1990*		at Stephen F. Austin; SFA/Ladyjack Dial Classic	L 69–70	4–1	William R. Johnson Coliseum (2,376); Nacogdoches, TX
December 8, 1990*		McNeese State	W 116–53	5–1	Montagne Center (455); Beaumont, TX
December 15, 1990*		Houston	W 85–67	6–1	Montagne Center (685); Beaumont, TX
December 17, 1990*		North Texas	W 84–55	7–1	Montagne Center (594); Beaumont, TX
December 20, 1990*		at Alabama; Alabama Shoney Classic	W 72–62	8–1	Coleman Coliseum (204); Tuscaloosa, AL
December 21, 1990*		vs. Southern Mississippi; Alabama Shoney Classic	W 90–71	9–1	Coleman Coliseum (199); Tuscaloosa, AL
December 29, 1990*		Rice	W 90–56	10–1	Montagne Center (1,083); Beaumont, TX
January 3, 1991*		UTEP	W 95–49	11–1	Montagne Center (682); Beaumont, TX
January 5, 1991		UTPA	W 94–34	12–1 (1–0)	Montagne Center (1,146); Beaumont, TX
January 10, 1991*		at UTSA	W 96–71	13–1	Convocation Center (196); San Antonio, TX
January 14, 1991		UCF	W 108–70	14–1 (2–0)	Montagne Center (614); Beaumont, TX
January 17, 1991		at New Orleans	W 78–56	15–1 (3–0)	Lakefront Arena (222); New Orleans, LA
January 19, 1991		at Louisiana–Lafayette	W 105–60	16–1 (4–0)	CajunDome (265); Lafayette, LA
January 24, 1991		Louisiana Tech	W 83–72	17–1 (5–0)	Montagne Center (5,123); Beaumont, TX
January 26, 1991		Arkansas State	W 89–79	18–1 (6–0)	Montagne Center (3,817); Beaumont, TX
January 28, 1991*		at Alcorn State	L 83–92	18–2	Davey Whitney Complex (237); Lorman, MS
February 2, 1991		at UTPA	W 93–46	19–2 (7–0)	UTPA Fieldhouse (100); Edinburg, TX
February 7, 1991*		at Maine	W 69–68	20–2	Alfond Arena (1,178); Orono, ME
February 9, 1991		at UCF	W 105–101	21–2 (8–0)	UCF Arena (110); Orlando, FL
February 14, 1991		New Orleans	W 66–56	22–2 (9–0)	Montagne Center (1,693); Beaumont, TX
February 16, 1991		Louisiana–Lafayette	W 112–50	23–2 (10–0)	Montagne Center (2,467); Beaumont, TX
February 21, 1991		at Louisiana Tech	W 90–76	24–2 (11–0)	Thomas Assembly Center (2,610); Ruston, LA
February 23, 1991		at Arkansas State	W 88–77	25–2 (12–0)	Convocation Center (1,300); Jonesboro, AR
American South Tournament
March 8, 1991		vs. New Orleans	W 87–74	26–2	Thomas Assembly Center (1,646); Ruston, LA
March 9, 1991		at Louisiana Tech	L 76–77	26–3	Thomas Assembly Center (1,775); Ruston, LA
1991 NCAA Division I women's tournament
March 13, 1991	(MW 10)	at (MW 7) Texas; First round	W 77–63	27–3	Frank Erwin Center (4,081); Austin, TX
March 17, 1991	(MW 10)	(MW 2) LSU; Second round	W 93–73	28–3	Montagne Center (9,143); Beaumont, TX
March 21, 1991	(MW 10)	vs. (MW 3) Arkansas; Semifinals	W 91–75	29–3	Frank Erwin Center (3,625); Austin, TX
March 23, 1991	(MW 10)	vs. (MW 1) Virginia; Finals	L 70–85	29–4	Frank Erwin Center (5,259); Austin, TX
*Non-conference game. ^{#}Rankings from AP poll. (#) Tournament seedings in parentheses. All times are in Central Time.
