= 1990–91 Clemson Tigers women's basketball team =

Women's college basketball season

1990–91 Clemson Tigers women's basketball

NCAA Tournament, Elite Eight
- Conference: Atlantic Coast Conference

Ranking
- Coaches: No. 8
- AP: No. 21
- Record: 22–11 (8–6 ACC)
- Head coach: Jim Davis (4th season)
- Home arena: Littlejohn Coliseum; Civic Center of Anderson (1 game)

1990–91 ACC women's basketball standings
	Conf.				Overall
Team	W		L	PCT	W		L	PCT
No. 2 Virginia	14	–	0	1.000	31	–	3	.912
No. 7 NC State †	9	–	5	.643	27	–	6	.818
Maryland	9	–	5	.643	17	–	13	.567
No. 21 Clemson	8	–	6	.571	22	–	11	.667
Duke	6	–	8	.429	16	–	12	.571
Wake Forest	5	–	9	.357	15	–	13	.536
Georgia Tech	3	–	11	.214	15	–	13	.536
North Carolina	2	–	12	.143	12	–	16	.429
† 1991 ACC tournament winner Rankings from AP poll

The 1990–91 Clemson Tigers women's basketball team represented Clemson University during the 1990–91 NCAA Division I women's basketball season. The Tigers were led by fourth year head coach Jim Davis. The Tigers, members of the Atlantic Coast Conference, played their home games at Littlejohn Coliseum.

== Schedule ==
Date time, TV	Rank^{#}	Opponent^{#}	Result	Record	Site city, state
November 24, 1990*	No. 21	vs. Alabama State; Kansas State Invitational	W 83–74	1–0	Bramlage Coliseum; Manhattan, Kansas
November 25, 1990*	No. 21	at Kansas State; Kansas State Invitational	W 68–61	2–0	Bramlage Coliseum; Manhattan, Kansas
December 1, 1990*	No. 19	College of Charleston	W 86–52	3–0	Littlejohn Coliseum; Clemson, South Carolina
December 5, 1990*	No. 17	UNC–Charlotte	W 74–63	4–0	Littlejohn Coliseum; Clemson, South Carolina
December 8, 1990*	No. 17	No. 22 South Carolina rivalry	W 73–40	5–0	Littlejohn Coliseum; Clemson, South Carolina
December 15, 1990*	No. 16	Augusta	W 95–61	6–0	Littlejohn Coliseum; Clemson, South Carolina
December 20, 1990*	No. 16	at California; California Golden Bear Classic	L 86–90 ^{OT}	6–1	Haas Pavilion; Berkeley, California
December 21, 1990*	No. 16	vs. Fresno State; California Golden Bear Classic	W 65–43	7–1	Haas Pavilion; Berkeley, California
January 2, 1991	No. 16	No. 2 NC State	W 82–73	8–1 (1–0)	Littlejohn Coliseum; Clemson, South Carolina
January 5, 1991*	No. 16	Brigham Young	W 81–59	9–1 (1–0)	Civic Center of Anderson; Anderson, South Carolina
January 9, 1991	No. 12	No. 2 Virginia	L 75–81	9–2 (1–1)	Littlejohn Coliseum; Clemson, South Carolina
January 11, 1991	No. 12	Maryland	L 68–71	9–3 (1–2)	Littlejohn Coliseum; Clemson, South Carolina
January 14, 1991*	No. 12	Radford	W 90–45	10–3 (1–2)	Littlejohn Coliseum; Clemson, South Carolina
January 16, 1991*	No. 17	at South Carolina rivalry	L 62–75	10–4 (1–2)	Carolina Coliseum; Columbia, South Carolina
January 19, 1991	No. 17	at No. 4 NC State	L 55–77	10–5 (1–3)	Reynolds Coliseum; Raleigh, North Carolina
January 21, 1991	No. 17	at Wake Forest	W 69–63	11–5 (2–3)	LJVM Coliseum; Winston-Salem, North Carolina
January 23, 1991	No. 21	at Georgia Tech	W 63–61	12–5 (3–3)	Alexander Memorial Coliseum; Atlanta, Georgia
January 26, 1991	No. 21	North Carolina	W 79–66	13–5 (4–3)	Littlejohn Coliseum; Clemson, South Carolina
January 28, 1991	No. 21	Duke	W 63–49	14–5 (5–3)	Littlejohn Coliseum; Clemson, South Carolina
January 30, 1991*	No. 20	South Carolina State	W 81–45	15–5 (5–3)	Littlejohn Coliseum; Clemson, South Carolina
February 7, 1991*	No. 19	at No. 3 Georgia	L 59–96	15–6 (5–3)	Stegeman Coliseum; Athens, Georgia
February 9, 1991	No. 19	Wake Forest	L 58–59	15–7 (5–4)	Littlejohn Coliseum; Clemson, South Carolina
February 11, 1991	No. 19	Georgia Tech	W 76–64	16–7 (6–4)	Littlejohn Coliseum; Clemson, South Carolina
February 14, 1991	No. 23	at Maryland	W 74–63	17–7 (7–4)	Cole Field House; College Park, Maryland
February 16, 1991	No. 23	at No. 1 Virginia	L 62–89	17–8 (7–5)	University Hall; Charlottesville, Virginia
February 22, 1991	No. 24	at Duke	W 67–59	18–8 (8–5)	Cameron Indoor Stadium; Durham, North Carolina
February 24, 1991	No. 24	at North Carolina	L 54–58	18–9 (8–6)	Carmichael Arena; Chapel Hill, North Carolina
ACC Tournament
March 2, 1991*		vs. Duke; ACC Tournament quarterfinal	W 60–58	19–9 (8–6)	Civic Center; Fayetteville, North Carolina
March 3, 1991*		vs. No. 1 Virginia; ACC Tournament semifinal	W 65–62	20–9 (8–6)	Civic Center; Fayetteville, North Carolina
March 4, 1991*		vs. No. 7 NC State; ACC Tournament finalfinal	L 61–84	20–10 (8–6)	Civic Center; Fayetteville, North Carolina
NCAA Tournament
March 16, 1991*	No. 21	No. 15 Providence; NCAA Tournament second round	W 103–91	21–10 (8–6)	Littlejohn Coliseum; Clemson, South Carolina
March 21, 1991*	No. 21	vs. James Madison; NCAA East Region semifinal	W 57–55	22–10 (8–6)	Palestra; Philadelphia, Pennsylvania
March 23, 1991*	No. 21	vs. No. 13 Connecticut; NCAA Tournament East Region final	L 57–60	22–11 (8–6)	Palestra; Philadelphia, Pennsylvania
*Non-conference game. ^{#}Rankings from AP Poll. (#) Tournament seedings in parentheses.
