= 1990–91 Virginia Cavaliers women's basketball team =

Intercollegiate basketball season

1990–91 Virginia Cavaliers women's basketball

ACC regular season champion

NCAA tournament, Runner-up
- Conference: Atlantic Coast Conference

Ranking
- Coaches: No. 2
- AP: No. 2
- Record: 31–3 (14–0 ACC)
- Head coach: Debbie Ryan (14th season)
- Assistant coaches: Frank DiLeo; Shawn Campbell; Melissa Wiggins
- Home arena: University Hall

1990–91 ACC women's basketball standings
	Conf.				Overall
Team	W		L	PCT	W		L	PCT
No. 2 Virginia	14	–	0	1.000	31	–	3	.912
No. 7 NC State †	9	–	5	.643	27	–	6	.818
Maryland	9	–	5	.643	17	–	13	.567
No. 21 Clemson	8	–	6	.571	22	–	11	.667
Duke	6	–	8	.429	16	–	12	.571
Wake Forest	5	–	9	.357	15	–	13	.536
Georgia Tech	3	–	11	.214	15	–	13	.536
North Carolina	2	–	12	.143	12	–	16	.429
† 1991 ACC tournament winner Rankings from AP poll

The 1990–91 Virginia Cavaliers women's basketball team represented the University of Virginia during the 1990–91 NCAA Division I women's basketball season. The Cavaliers were led by 14th-year head coach Debbie Ryan, and played their home games at University Hall in Charlottesville, Virginia as members the Atlantic Coast Conference.

In contrast to the prior season when the Cavaliers reached the Final Four, this Virginia squad was considered one of the favorites to win the National championship. The Lady Cavs opened play as the No. 1 ranked team and only occupied that spot or the No. 2 spot for the entirety of the season. They swept through ACC play at 14–0, but lost in the semifinals of the ACC tournament to Clemson. Despite the loss, UVA received the No. 1 seed in the Midwest region of the NCAA tournament. Virginia defeated Stephen F. Austin, Oklahoma State, and Lamar to make a return trip to the Final Four. A victory over UConn in the National semifinals set up a matchup with Tennessee in the National championship game. The Lady Vols, led by legendary head coach Pat Summitt defeated Virginia, 70–67, to capture the title. The Cavaliers finished the season with a record of 31–3.

Junior Dawn Staley established the single-season school record for assists with 235. Staley was consensus National Player of the Year and is the only player to be named Most Outstanding Player of the NCAA tournament when her team did not win the championship.

== Roster ==
1990–91 Virginia Cavaliers women's basketball team
Players
Coaches

Pos.	#	Name	Height	Year	Previous school	Hometown
G	10	Dena Evans	5 ft 5 in (1.65 m)	So		Deer Park, TX
G	15	Tina Toney	5 ft 8 in (1.73 m)	Sr		Jacksonville, FL
F	20	Tekshia Ward	6 ft 1 in (1.85 m)	Sr		College Park, GA
F/C	21	Melanee Wagener	6 ft 2 in (1.88 m)	Jr		Mount Airy, MD
F	23	Tonya Cardoza (C)	5 ft 10 in (1.78 m)	Sr		Roxbury, MA
G	24	Dawn Staley	5 ft 6 in (1.68 m)	Jr	Dobbins Tech	Philadelphia, PA
C	30	Heather Burge	6 ft 5 in (1.96 m)	So	Palos Verdes	Palos Verdes Estates, CA
G	32	Tammi Reiss	5 ft 6 in (1.68 m)	Jr	Eldred Central School	Eldred, NY
F	33	Wendy Toussaint	5 ft 11 in (1.8 m)	Fr	Palos Verdes	Irvington, NJ
C	34	Heidi Burge	6 ft 5 in (1.96 m)	So		Palos Verdes Estates, CA
F	44	Allison Moore	6 ft 1 in (1.85 m)	So		Virginia Beach, VA
F	52	Felicia Santelli	6 ft 0 in (1.83 m)	Jr		Scarsdale, NY
F/C	54	Audra Smith	6 ft 2 in (1.88 m)	Jr		Milledgeville, GA

Head coach

- Debbie Ryan (Ursinus)

Assistant coach(es)

Legend

- (C) Team captain
- (S) Suspended
- (I) Ineligible
- (W) Walk-on
- Injured
- Current redshirt

Roster

== Schedule ==
Date time, TV	Rank^{#}	Opponent^{#}	Result	Record	Site (attendance) city, state
Regular season
Nov 28, 1990*	No. 1	Virginia Tech	W 93–44	2–0	University Hall; Charlottesville, Virginia
Jan 3, 1991*	No. 1	No. 4 Penn State	L 71–73	11–1	University Hall; Charlottesville, Virginia
Jan 12, 1991	No. 2	at No. 3 NC State	W 123–120 ^{3OT}	14–1 (3–0)	Reynolds Coliseum; Raleigh, North Carolina
February 23, 1991	No. 1	No. 7 NC State	W 95–78	26–1 (14–0)	University Hall; Charlottesville, Virginia
ACC tournament
March 2, 1991*	No. 1	vs. North Carolina; Quarterfinals	W 90–69	27–1	Civic Center; Fayetteville, North Carolina
March 3, 1991*	No. 1	vs. Clemson; Semifinals	L 62–65	27–2	Civic Center; Fayetteville, North Carolina
NCAA tournament
March 17, 1991*	No. 2	vs. No. 14 Stephen F. Austin; Second round	W 74–71	28–2	University Hall; Charlottesville, Virginia
March 21, 1991*	No. 2	vs. No. 25 Oklahoma State; Midwest Regional Semifinal – Sweet Sixteen	W 76–61	29–2	Frank Erwin Center; Austin, Texas
March 23, 1991*	No. 2	vs. No. 24 Lamar; Midwest Regional Final – Elite Eight	W 85–70	30–2	Frank Erwin Center (5,259); Austin, Texas
March 30, 1991*	No. 2	vs. No. 13 UConn; National Semifinal – Final Four	W 61–55	31–2	Lakefront Arena; New Orleans, Louisiana
March 31, 1991*	No. 2	vs. No. 4 Tennessee; National Championship	L 67–70 ^{OT}	31–3	Lakefront Arena; New Orleans, Louisiana
*Non-conference game. ^{#}Rankings from AP Poll. (#) Tournament seedings in parentheses. All times are in Eastern.

== Rankings ==
Ranking movements Legend: ██ Increase in ranking ██ Decrease in ranking
	Week																	
Poll	Pre	1	2	3	4	5	6	7	8	9	10	11	12	13	14	15	16	Final
AP	1	1	1	1	1	1	1	2	1	1	1	1	1	1	1	2	2	Not released
Coaches	1	1	1	1	1	1	1	2	1	1	1	1	1	1	1	3	2	2

== Awards and honors ==
- Dawn Staley – ACC Player of the Year, Naismith College Player of the Year, USBWA Player of the Year, WBCA Player of the Year, Honda Sports Award
- Debbie Ryan – ACC Coach of the Year, Naismith College Coach of the Year
