= Stanford Cardinal women's basketball =

American college basketball team

2026–27 Stanford Cardinal women's basketball team
- University: Stanford University
- First season: 1974–75; 52 years ago
- Athletic director: John Donahoe
- Head coach: Kate Paye (3rd season)
- Location: Stanford, California
- Arena: Maples Pavilion (capacity: 7,233)
- Conference: ACC
- Nickname: Cardinal
- Colors: Cardinal and white
- Student section: The Red Zone

NCAA Division I tournament champions
- 1990, 1992, 2021
Other NCAA Division I tournament results
Runner-up	2008, 2010
Final Four	1990, 1991, 1992, 1995, 1996, 1997, 2008, 2009, 2010, 2011, 2012, 2014, 2017, 2021, 2022
Elite Eight	1989, 1990, 1991, 1992, 1994, 1995, 1996, 1997, 2004, 2005, 2006, 2008, 2009, 2010, 2011, 2012, 2014, 2016, 2017, 2019, 2021, 2022
Sweet Sixteen	1988, 1989, 1990, 1991, 1992, 1993, 1994, 1995, 1996, 1997, 2002, 2004, 2005, 2006, 2008, 2009, 2010, 2011, 2012, 2013, 2014, 2015, 2016, 2017, 2018, 2019, 2021, 2022, 2024
Appearances	1982, 1988, 1989, 1990, 1991, 1992, 1993, 1994, 1995, 1996, 1997, 1998, 1999, 2000, 2001, 2002, 2003, 2004, 2005, 2006, 2007, 2008, 2009, 2010, 2011, 2012, 2013, 2014, 2015, 2016, 2017, 2018, 2019, 2021, 2022, 2023, 2024

Conference tournament champions
- 2003, 2004, 2005, 2007, 2008, 2009, 2010, 2011, 2012, 2013, 2015, 2017, 2019, 2021, 2022

Conference regular-season champions
- 1989, 1990, 1991, 1992, 1993, 1994, 1995, 1996, 1997, 1998, 2001, 2002, 2003, 2004, 2005, 2006, 2007, 2008, 2009, 2010, 2011, 2012, 2013, 2014, 2021, 2022, 2023, 2024

Uniforms
Home	Away

The Stanford Cardinal women's basketball team represents Stanford University, located in Stanford, California. The school's team currently competes in the Atlantic Coast Conference. The Cardinal are led by head coach Kate Paye, who previously served as the associate head coach under Tara VanDerveer, the all-time winningest coach in college basketball history before her retirement in 2024. The Cardinal won national championships in 1990, 1992 and 2021, and were runners-up in 2008 and 2010.

== History ==
=== Early development and the VanDerveer arrival (1974–1988) ===
The Stanford Cardinal women's basketball program began varsity competition in the 1974–75 season, amid the growing impact of Title IX on collegiate athletics. The team competed in the Association for Intercollegiate Athletics for Women (AIAW) during its first decade, making tournament appearances in 1978, 1979, and 1980. Though Stanford posted some early 20-win seasons, the program lacked consistent leadership and national visibility through its first decade. It wasn't until the hiring of Tara VanDerveer in 1985 that the trajectory of Stanford basketball began to change.

VanDerveer inherited a struggling program that had gone 9–19 the year prior. In just three seasons, she engineered a dramatic turnaround. Her methodical, defense-first philosophy laid the foundation for a transformation that culminated in Stanford's first NCAA Tournament appearance in 1988. That year, the team went 27–5, won the Pac-10 regular-season title, and reached the Sweet Sixteen.

=== National breakthrough and early championships (1989–1992) ===
Stanford's rise to national prominence culminated in the 1989–90 season, when the Cardinal captured their first NCAA national championship. Behind point guard Jennifer Azzi and forward Katy Steding, Stanford finished with a 32–1 record and steamrolled through the NCAA Tournament. The Cardinal scored 114 points in a rout of Arkansas in the Elite Eight, defeated Virginia 75–66 in the Final Four, and overcame a 17-point halftime deficit to beat Auburn 88–81 in the national championship game. Azzi was named the Final Four's Most Outstanding Player and earned the Naismith and Wade Trophy awards.

Stanford remained a Final Four contender in the following seasons. In 1991, they advanced to the national semifinals before falling to Tennessee. Then in 1992, the Cardinal captured their second national title. Led by Val Whiting, Rachel Hemmer, and Molly Goodenbour, Stanford defeated Western Kentucky 78–62 in the championship game, capping a dominant tournament run. Goodenbour, who hit a then-record 18 three-pointers during the tournament, was named the Final Four's Most Outstanding Player. By the mid 1990s, Tara VanDerveer had firmly established Stanford as one of the top programs in the country.

=== Sustained excellence and Final Four regulars (1993–1997) ===
Stanford remained an elite program throughout the 1990s, continuing to dominate the Pac-10 while consistently earning top seeds in the NCAA Tournament. Led by All-American players like Christy Hedgpeth, Jamila Wideman, and Kate Starbird, the Cardinal reached the Final Four in 1995, 1996, and 1997. Starbird, the 1997 Naismith Player of the Year, led a team that went 34–2 and advanced to the national semifinals, where they were upset by Old Dominion.

During the 1996–97 season, Tara VanDerveer took a yearlong sabbatical to coach the United States national team at the Atlanta Olympics. Under her guidance, Team USA went undefeated and won the gold medal. Back at Stanford, interim coaches Amy Tucker and Marianne Stanley led the Cardinal to a 34–2 record and a return trip to the Final Four. The program's ability to thrive even in VanDerveer's absence underscored the system and culture she had built in Palo Alto.

=== Early 2000s plateau and rebuilding (1998–2007) ===
After a decade of consistent Final Four appearances, the early 2000s marked a relatively quiet stretch for the Cardinal by their lofty standards. Although Stanford remained dominant in Pac-10 play—winning multiple regular-season titles—the team failed to return to the Final Four from 1998 through 2007. Several promising teams were derailed by injuries, including the 2001 squad, which lost All-American Susan King Borchardt to a torn ACL.

However, the team continued to produce elite players, including Nicole Powell, who became a three-time All-American and led Stanford to the Elite Eight in 2004. That year marked a turning point, as VanDerveer and her staff began assembling a new generation of stars that would return the program to the national spotlight.

=== The Ogwumike era and Final Four renaissance (2008–2014) ===
The late 2000s and early 2010s brought a dramatic resurgence under VanDerveer, driven by the emergence of star players like Candice Wiggins, Jayne Appel, and most notably, sisters Nneka and Chiney Ogwumike. From 2008 to 2014, Stanford returned to national prominence with six Final Four appearances: 2008, 2009, 2010, 2011, 2012, and 2014. The Cardinal won the Pac-10/Pac-12 regular-season title each of those seasons and consistently entered the NCAA Tournament as a No. 1 or No. 2 seed.

The 2008 team reached the national title game after upsetting UConn 82–73 in the Final Four, but fell to Tennessee 64–48 in the championship game. In 2010, Nneka Ogwumike scored 38 points in a national semifinal win over Oklahoma, but the Cardinal were narrowly defeated by UConn in the title game, 53–47. In that contest, Stanford held UConn to just 12 first-half points but couldn't overcome their own offensive struggles in the second half.

Chiney Ogwumike took over as the program's leader in the early 2010s, finishing her career as the Pac-12's all-time leading scorer and rebounder. Despite her dominant play, Stanford fell short of returning to the national title game. In 2014, they reached their sixth Final Four in seven years before losing to eventual champion UConn in the National Semifinals, 75–56.

=== The Haley Jones–Cameron Brink era and third championship (2015–2022) ===
Following a brief rebuilding period in the mid-2010s, Stanford returned to the national stage behind a new core of elite talent in the early 2020s. Players like Alanna Smith, Kiana Williams, Lexie and Lacie Hull, Haley Jones, Anna Wilson, and Cameron Brink helped revitalize the program. The Cardinal won the Pac-12 Tournament in 2021 and entered the NCAA Tournament as a No. 1 seed.

The 2020–21 season, played under strict COVID-19 protocols, proved historic. Stanford played much of the season away from home due to Santa Clara County restrictions, yet still finished 31–2. In the Final Four, the Cardinal edged South Carolina 66–65 in a thriller that ended with a last-second block by Brink. Two nights later, Stanford claimed its third national championship with a narrow 54–53 win over Arizona. Haley Jones scored 17 points in the title game and was named the Final Four's Most Outstanding Player.

Stanford followed up their title in the 2021–22 season with a 32–4 campaign, again earning a No. 1 seed in the NCAA tournament and reaching the Final Four. In the National Semifinals, they fell to UConn 63–58 in a tightly contested game. It marked the program's 15th Final Four appearance.

=== Post-title challenges and the end of an era (2023–2024) ===
The 2022–23 season saw the Cardinal once again secure a #1 seed in the NCAA tournament, but they were stunned in the second round by #8 seeded Ole Miss, 54–49. The loss marked the end of Stanford's streak of 15 consecutive Sweet Sixteen appearances. In 2023–24, Stanford entered the tournament as a #2 seed, defeating Norfolk State and surviving Iowa State in an overtime battle, 87–81. However, their run ended in the Sweet Sixteen with a 77–67 loss to eventual Final Four contender NC State.

Despite strong regular seasons, the inability to return to the Final Four led to speculation about a coming transition. That speculation was confirmed in April 2024, when Tara VanDerveer announced her retirement after 38 seasons at Stanford. With 1,216 career victories, VanDerveer retired as the winningest coach in NCAA basketball history, men's or women's. Her legacy included three national championships, 15 Final Four appearances, and a record of sustained excellence unmatched in the modern era of the sport.

== Season-by-season results ==
Record table
Season	Coach	Overall	Conference	Standing	Postseason
Gay Coburn (NCIAC) (1974–1976)
1974–75	Gay Coburn	8–3		—	—
1975–76	Gay Coburn	10–7		—	—
Coburn:		18–10			
Dotty McCrea (NCIAC/NCAC/WCAA) (1976–1985)
1976–77	Dotty McCrea	8–11		—	—
1977–78	Dotty McCrea	17–12		—	AIAW Regional
1978–79	Dotty McCrea	20–6	7–5	4	AIAW Regional
1979–80	Dotty McCrea	17–14	7–5	T–3rd	AIAW Regional
1980–81	Dotty McCrea	15–16	5–7	5	—
1981–82	Dotty McCrea	19–8	9–3	2	NCAA first round
1982–83	Dotty McCrea	19–16	5–9	5	—
1983–84	Dotty McCrea	5–23	1–13	T–7th	—
1984–85	Dotty McCrea	9–19	2–12	7th	—
MacCrea:		129–125			
Tara VanDerveer (Pac-West/Pac-10) (1985–1995)
1985–86	Tara VanDerveer	13–15	1–7	5th	—
1986–87	Tara VanDerveer	14–14	8–10	T–6th	—
1987–88	Tara VanDerveer	27–5	14–4	3rd	NCAA Sweet 16
1988–89	Tara VanDerveer	28–3	18–0	1st	NCAA Elite 8
1989–90	Tara VanDerveer	32–1	17–1	T–1st	NCAA Champions
1990–91	Tara VanDerveer	26–6	16–2	1st	NCAA Final Four
1991–92	Tara VanDerveer	30–3	15–3	1st	NCAA Champions
1992–93	Tara VanDerveer	26–6	15–3	1st	NCAA Sweet 16
1993–94	Tara VanDerveer	25–6	15–3	2nd	NCAA Elite 8
1994–95	Tara VanDerveer	30–3	17–1	1st	NCAA Final Four
VanDerveer (1st stint):		251–62			
Amy Tucker/Marianne Stanley (Pac–10) (1995–1996)
1995–96	Amy Tucker/Marianne Stanley	29–3	18–0	1st	NCAA Final Four
Tucker/Stanley:		29–3			
Tara VanDerveer (Pac-10/Pac-12) (1996–2024)
1996–97	Tara VanDerveer	34–2	18–0	1st	NCAA Final Four
1997–98	Tara VanDerveer	21–6	17–1	1st	NCAA 1st round
1998–99	Tara VanDerveer	18–12	14–4	3rd	NCAA 1st round
1999–2000	Tara VanDerveer	21–9	13–5	T–2nd	NCAA 2nd round
2000–01	Tara VanDerveer	19–11	12–6	T–1st	NCAA 2nd round
2001–02	Tara VanDerveer	32–3	18–0	1st	NCAA Sweet 16
2002–03	Tara VanDerveer	27–5	15–3	1st	NCAA 2nd round
2003–04	Tara VanDerveer	27–7	14–4	T–1st	NCAA Elite 8
2004–05	Tara VanDerveer	32–3	17–1	1st	NCAA Elite 8
2005–06	Tara VanDerveer	26–8	15–3	1st	NCAA Elite 8
2006–07	Tara VanDerveer	29–5	17–1	1st	NCAA 2nd round
2007–08	Tara VanDerveer	35–4	16–2	1st	NCAA Runner–up
2008–09	Tara VanDerveer	33–5	17–1	1st	NCAA Final Four
2009–10	Tara VanDerveer	36–2	18–0	1st	NCAA Runner–up
2010–11	Tara VanDerveer	33–3	18–0	1st	NCAA Final Four
2011–12	Tara VanDerveer	35–2	18–0	1st	NCAA Final Four
2012–13	Tara VanDerveer	33–3	17–1	1st	NCAA Sweet 16
2013–14	Tara VanDerveer	33–4	17–1	1st	NCAA Final Four
2014–15	Tara VanDerveer	26–10	13–5	3rd	NCAA Sweet 16
2015–16	Tara VanDerveer	27–8	14–4	T–3rd	NCAA Elite 8
2016–17	Tara VanDerveer	32–6	15–3	2nd	NCAA Final Four
2017–18	Tara VanDerveer	24–11	14–3	2nd	NCAA Sweet 16
2018–19	Tara VanDerveer	31–5	15–3	2nd	NCAA Elite 8
2019–20	Tara VanDerveer	27–6	14–4	T-2nd	Postseason canceled due to the COVID-19 pandemic.
2020–21	Tara VanDerveer	31–2	19–2	1st	NCAA Champions
2021–22	Tara VanDerveer	32–4	16–0	1st	NCAA Final Four
2022–23	Tara VanDerveer	29–6	15–3	T–1st	NCAA Second Round
2023–24	Tara VanDerveer	30–6	13–3	1st	NCAA Sweet Sixteen
VanDerveer (2nd stint):		805–157			
VanDerveer (Total):		1,057–219			
Kate Paye (ACC) (2024–present)
2024–25	Kate Paye	16–15	8–10	T-10th	WBIT first round
2025–26	Kate Paye	21–14	8–10	T-11th	WBIT quarterfinals
Paye:		37–29 (.561)	16–20 (.444)		
Total:		1,270–386 (.767)			
National champion Postseason invitational champion Conference regular season champion Conference regular season and conference tournament champion Division regular season champion Division regular season and conference tournament champion Conference tournament champion

== Postseason results ==
=== NCAA tournament results ===
The Cardinal have appeared in the NCAA Division I women's basketball tournament 37 times. Their combined record is 102–34.

Year	Seed	Round	Opponent	Result
1982	#7	First Round	#2 Maryland	L 48−82
1988	#5	Second Round; Sweet Sixteen	#4 Montana #1 Texas	W 74−72 (OT); L 58−79
1989	#2	Second Round; Sweet Sixteen; Elite Eight	#7 Illinois State #3 Iowa #1 Louisiana Tech	W 105−77; W 98−74; L 75–85
1990	#1	Second Round; Sweet Sixteen; Elite Eight; Final Four; National Championship	#9 Hawaii #5 Ole Miss #7 Arkansas #2 Virginia #2 Auburn	W 106−76; W 78−65; W 114–87; W 75–66; W 88–81
1991	#2	Second Round; Sweet Sixteen; Elite Eight; Final Four	#7 Cal State Fullerton #3 Washington #1 Georgia #1 Tennessee	W 91−67; W 73−47; W 75–67; L 60–68
1992	#1	Second Round; Sweet Sixteen; Elite Eight; Final Four; National Championship	#9 UC Santa Barbara #4 Texas Tech #3 USC #1 Virginia #4 Western Kentucky	W 82−73; W 75−63; W 82–62; W 66–65; W 78–62
1993	#1	Second Round; Sweet Sixteen	#8 Georgia #4 Colorado	W 93−60; L 67−80
1994	#2	First Round; Second Round; Sweet Sixteen; Elite Eight	#15 Wisconsin–Green Bay #7 Montana #3 Colorado #1 Purdue	W 81−56; W 66−62; W 78–62; L 65–82
1995	#2	First Round; Second Round; Sweet Sixteen; Elite Eight; Final Four	#15 UC Irvine #10 SMU #3 North Carolina #4 Purdue #1 Connecticut	W 88−55; W 95−73; W 81–71; W69–58; L 60–87
1996	#1	First Round; Second Round; Sweet Sixteen; Elite Eight; Final Four	#16 Grambling State #8 Colorado State #4 Alabama #6 Auburn #2 Georgia	W 82−43; W 94−63; W 78–76; W71–57; L 76–86
1997	#1	First Round; Second Round; Sweet Sixteen; Elite Eight; Final Four	#16 Howard #8 Texas Tech #4 Virginia #2 Georgia #1 Old Dominion	W 111−59; W 67−45; W 91–69; W 82–47; L 82–83
1998	#1	First Round	#16 Harvard	L 67−71
1999	#7	First Round	#10 Maine	L 58−60
2000	#9	First Round; Second Round	#8 Michigan #1 Georgia	W 71−64 (OT); L 64–83
2001	#10	First Round; Second Round	#7 George Washington #2 Oklahoma	W 76−51; L 50–67
2002	#2	First Round; Second Round; Sweet Sixteen	#15 Weber State #10 Tulane #3 Colorado	W 76−51; W 77–55; L 59–62
2003	#3	First Round; Second Round	#14 Western Michigan #6 Minnesota	W 82−66; L 56–68
2004	#6	First Round; Second Round; Sweet Sixteen; Elite Eight	#11 Missouri #3 Oklahoma #2 Vanderbilt #1 Tennessee	W 68−44; W 68−43; W 57–55; L 60–62
2005	#2	First Round; Second Round; Sweet Sixteen; Elite Eight	#15 Santa Clara #10 Utah #3 Connecticut #1 Michigan State	W 94−57; W 88−62; W 76–59; L 69–76
2006	#3	First Round; Second Round; Sweet Sixteen; Elite Eight	#14 SE Missouri #6 Florida State #2 Oklahoma #1 LSU	W 72−45; W 88−70; W 88–74; L 59–62
2007	#2	First Round; Second Round	#15 Idaho State #10 Florida State	W 96−58; L 61–68
2008	#2	First Round; Second Round; Sweet Sixteen; Elite Eight; Final Four; National Championship	#15 Cleveland State #7 UTEP #6 Pittsburgh #1 Maryland #1 Connecticut #1 Tennessee	W 85−47; W 88−54; W 72–53; W 98–87; W 82–73; L 48–64
2009	#2	First Round; Second Round; Sweet Sixteen; Elite Eight; Final Four	#15 UC Santa Barbara #10 San Diego State #3 Ohio State #4 Iowa State #1 Connecticut	W 74−39; W 77−49; W 84–66; W74–53; L 64–83
2010	#1	First Round; Second Round; Sweet Sixteen; Elite Eight; Final Four; National Championship	#16 UC Riverside #8 Iowa #5 Georgia #3 Xavier #3 Oklahoma #1 Connecticut	W 79−47; W 96−67; W 73–36; W 55–53; W 73–66; L 47–53
2011	#1	First Round; Second Round; Sweet Sixteen; Elite Eight; Final Four	#16 UC Davis #9 St. John's #5 North Carolina #11 Gonzaga #2 Texas A&M	W 86−59; W 75−49; W 72–65; W 83–60; L 62–63
2012	#1	First Round; Second Round; Sweet Sixteen; Elite Eight; Final Four	#16 Hampton #8 West Virginia #5 South Carolina #2 Duke #1 Baylor	W 73−51; W 72−55; W 76–60; W 81–69; L 47–59
2013	#1	First Round; Second Round; Sweet Sixteen	#16 Tulsa #8 Michigan #4 Georgia	W 72−56; W 73−40; L 59–61
2014	#2	First Round; Second Round; Sweet Sixteen; Elite Eight; Final Four	#15 South Dakota #10 Florida State #3 Penn State #4 North Carolina #1 Connecticut	W 81−62; W 63−44; W 82–57; W 74–65; L 56–75
2015	#4	First Round; Second Round; Sweet Sixteen	#13 Cal State Northridge #5 Oklahoma #1 Notre Dame	W 73−60; W 86−76; L 60–81
2016	#4	First Round; Second Round; Sweet Sixteen; Elite Eight	#13 San Francisco #12 South Dakota State #1 Notre Dame #7 Washington	W 85−58; W 66−65; W 90–84; L 76–85
2017	#2	First Round; Second Round; Sweet Sixteen; Elite Eight; Final Four	#15 New Mexico State #7 Kansas State #3 Texas #1 Notre Dame #1 South Carolina	W 72−64; W 69−48; W 77–66; W 76–75; L 53–62
2018	#4	First Round; Second Round; Sweet Sixteen	#13 Gonzaga #12 Florida Gulf Coast #1 Louisville	W 82−68; W 90−70; L 59–86
2019	#2	First Round; Second Round; Sweet Sixteen; Elite Eight	#15 UC Davis #7 BYU #11 Missouri State #1 Notre Dame	W 79−54; W 72−63; W 55–46; L 68–84
2021	#1	First Round; Second Round; Sweet Sixteen; Elite Eight; Final Four; National Championship	#16 Utah Valley #8 Oklahoma State #5 Missouri State #2 Louisville #1 South Carolina #3 Arizona	W 87−44; W 73−62; W 89−62; W 78−63; W 66−65; W 54–53
2022	#1	First Round; Second Round; Sweet Sixteen; Elite Eight; Final Four	#16 Montana State #8 Kansas #4 Maryland #2 Texas #2 UConn	W 78–37; W 91–65; W 72–66; W 59–50; L 58–63
2023	#1	First Round; Second Round	#16 Sacred Heart #8 Ole Miss	W 92–49; L 49–54
2024	#2	First Round; Second Round; Sweet Sixteen	#15 Norfolk State #7 Iowa State #3 NC State	W 79–50; W 87–81 (OT); L 67–77

The following lists where the Cardinal have been seeded in the NCAA tournament.

Years →	'82	'88	'90	'91	'92	'93	'94	'95	'96	'97	'98	'99	'00	'01	'02	'03	'04	'05	'06	'07	'08	'09	'10	'11	'12	'13	'14	'15	'16	'17	'18	'19	'21	'22	'23	'24
Seeds →	7	5	1	2	1	1	2	2	1	1	1	7	9	10	2	3	6	2	3	2	2	2	1	1	1	1	2	4	4	2	4	2	1	1	1	2

=== WBIT results ===
The Cardinal have appeared in the Women's Basketball Invitation Tournament twice. Their record is 2–2.

Year	Seed	Round	Opponent	Result
2025	#2	First Round	Portland	L 68–69 (OT)
2026	#2	First Round; Second Round; Quarterfinals	Loyola Marymount; Quinnipiac #1 BYU	W 80–76; W 81–69; L 61–76

== Notable players ==
=== Individual achievements ===
Lexie Lauren Hull

== Roster ==
2026–27 Stanford Cardinal women's basketball team
Players
Coaches

Pos.	#	Name	Height	Year	Previous school	Hometown
G	2	Hailee Swan	5 ft 11 in (1.8 m)	So	Holy Innocents' Episcopal	Marietta, GA
F	3	Ilse de Vries	6 ft 3 in (1.91 m)	Jr	Miami (OH)	Amsterdam, Netherlands
F/C	4	Alexandra Eschmeyer	6 ft 5 in (1.96 m)	So	Peak to Peak	Boulder, CO
G	6	Wrenwyck Ijiwoye	5 ft 6 in (1.68 m)	Jr	Desert Vista	Phoenix, AZ
F	10	Inés Sotelo Míguez	6 ft 3 in (1.91 m)	Jr	Michigan State	Ourense, Spain
F	13	Charlotte Tuhy	6 ft 1 in (1.85 m)	So	American	Madison, NJ
C	15	Kiara Green	6 ft 5 in (1.96 m)	Fr	Century	Hillsboro, OR
G	21	Elyse Ngenda	5 ft 9 in (1.75 m)	Fr	New Hampton	Bedford, NH
G/F	22	Gracyn Gilliard	5 ft 11 in (1.8 m)	Fr	Center Grove	Indianapolis, IN
G	23	Jordyn Wheeler	6 ft 0 in (1.83 m)	Fr	Niagara Prep	Thorold, Ontario
F	25	Nora Ezike	6 ft 2 in (1.88 m)	So	Lyons Township	La Grange, IL
C	45	Kennedy Umeh	6 ft 4 in (1.93 m)	Jr	McDonogh	Columbia, MD

Head coach

- Kate Paye (Stanford)

Assistant coach(es)

- Tempie Brown (Michigan)
- Heather Oesterle (Michigan)
- Steven Key (Boston University)
- Erica McCall (Stanford)
- Jeanette Pohlen (Stanford)

Legend

- (C) Team captain
- (S) Suspended
- (I) Ineligible
- (W) Walk-on
- Injured
- Current redshirt

Roster
Last update: September 19, 2026
