= Teaming =

Teaming may refer to:

- Link aggregation, in computing, known more specifically as NIC teaming or Network teaming
- the practice of being a teamster
- the formation of a team

== See also ==
- Double team (disambiguation)
