= 1990–91 Stanford Cardinal women's basketball team =

Intercollegiate basketball season

1990–91 Stanford Cardinal women's basketball

Pac–10 regular season champions

NCAA tournament, Final Four
- Conference: Pacific-10 Conference

Ranking
- Coaches: No. 3
- AP: No. 11
- Record: 26–6 (16–2 Pac-10)
- Head coach: Tara VanDerveer (6th season)
- Assistant coaches: Amy Tucker; Reneé Brown

1990–91 Pacific-10 Conference women's basketball standings
	Conf.				Overall
Team	W		L	PCT	W		L	PCT
No. 11 Stanford	16	–	2	.889	26	–	6	.813
No. 12 Washington	15	–	3	.833	24	–	5	.828
USC	11	–	7	.611	18	–	12	.600
Washington State	10	–	8	.556	18	–	11	.621
UCLA	10	–	8	.556	15	–	13	.536
Oregon State	9	–	9	.500	17	–	11	.607
California	7	–	11	.389	14	–	14	.500
Oregon	6	–	12	.333	13	–	15	.464
Arizona State	5	–	13	.278	14	–	14	.500
Arizona	1	–	17	.056	6	–	25	.194
As of April 1, 1991; Rankings from AP Poll

The 1990–91 Stanford Cardinal women's basketball team represented Stanford University in the 1990–91 NCAA Division I women's basketball season. The Cardinal were coached by Tara VanDerveer who was in her sixth year. The Cardinal were members of the Pacific-10 Conference.

After winning the conference title with a 16–2 record in Pac-10 games, the team reached the NCAA Final Four for the second straight season, and ended with an overall record of 26–6.

== Roster ==
1990–91 Stanford Cardinal women's basketball team
Players
Coaches

Pos.	#	Name	Height	Year	Hometown
G	11	Niki Sevillian	5 ft 10 in (1.78 m)	Fr	Flint, Michigan
G	15	Molly Goodenbour	5 ft 6 in (1.68 m)	So	Waterloo, Iowa
G	22	Angela Taylor	5 ft 6 in (1.68 m)	So	Mountain Home, Idaho
G	25	Christy Hedgpeth	5 ft 10 in (1.78 m)	Fr	Thomasville, North Carolina
F/C	30	Trisha Stevens	6 ft 3 in (1.91 m)	Sr	Philomath, Oregon
F	31	Chris MacMurdo	6 ft 0 in (1.83 m)	So	Aiken, South Carolina
F	33	Ann Adkins	5 ft 11 in (1.8 m)	Sr	Huntington, West Virginia
G	34	Sonja Henning	5 ft 8 in (1.73 m)	Sr	Racine, Wisconsin
G/F	41	Martha Richards	5 ft 11 in (1.8 m)	Jr	Hudson, Wisconsin
G/F	42	Kelly Dougherty	5 ft 11 in (1.8 m)	Fr	Leavenworth, Kansas
F/C	44	Julie Zeilstra	6 ft 3 in (1.91 m)	Jr	Vernal, Utah
C	52	Val Whiting	6 ft 3 in (1.91 m)	So	Wilmington, Delaware

Head coach

- Tara VanDerveer

Assistant coach(es)

Legend

- (C) Team captain
- (S) Suspended
- (I) Ineligible
- (W) Walk-on
- Injured
- Current redshirt

== Schedule ==
Date time, TV	Rank^{#}	Opponent^{#}	Result	Record	Site (attendance) city, state
Regular season
NCAA women's tournament
March 14, 1991*	(2 W) No. 11	(7 W) Cal State Fullerton; Second round	W 91–67	24–5	Maples Pavilion; Palo Alto, California
March 21, 1991*	(2 W) No. 11	vs. (3 W) No. 12 Washington; Regional Semifinal – Sweet Sixteen	W 73–47	25–5	Thomas & Mack Center; Las Vegas, Nevada
March 23, 1991*	(2 W) No. 11	vs. (1 W) No. 3 Georgia; Regional Final – Elite Eight	W 75–67	26–5	Thomas & Mack Center; Las Vegas, Nevada
March 30, 1991*	(2 W) No. 11	vs. (1 ME) No. 4 Tennessee; National Semifinal – Final Four	L 60–68	26–6	Lakefront Arena; New Orleans, Louisiana
*Non-conference game. ^{#}Rankings from AP Poll. (#) Tournament seedings in parentheses. W=Stanford, CA regional. All times are in Pacific Time.
