= 1991 ACC women's basketball tournament =

- Classification: Division I
- Teams: 8
- Site: Civic Center; Fayetteville, North Carolina
- Champions: NC State (4th title)
- Winning coach: Kay Yow (4th title)
- MVP: Sharon Manning (NC State)

1990–91 ACC women's basketball standings
	Conf.				Overall
Team	W		L	PCT	W		L	PCT
No. 2 Virginia	14	–	0	1.000	31	–	3	.912
No. 7 NC State †	9	–	5	.643	27	–	6	.818
Maryland	9	–	5	.643	17	–	13	.567
No. 21 Clemson	8	–	6	.571	22	–	11	.667
Duke	6	–	8	.429	16	–	12	.571
Wake Forest	5	–	9	.357	15	–	13	.536
Georgia Tech	3	–	11	.214	15	–	13	.536
North Carolina	2	–	12	.143	12	–	16	.429
† 1991 ACC tournament winner Rankings from AP poll

The 1991 Atlantic Coast Conference women's basketball tournament was the postseason women's basketball tournament for the Atlantic Coast Conference, held March 2–4, 1991, in Fayetteville, North Carolina, at the Civic Center.

== Bracket ==
Quarterfinals; Saturday, March 2
1	Virginia	90
8	North Carolina	69
4	Clemson	60
5	Duke	58
3	NC State	92
6	Wake Forest	72
2	Maryland	91
7	Georgia Tech	73

Semifinals; Sunday, March 3
1	Virginia	62
4	Clemson	65
3	NC State	82
2	Maryland	75

Championship game Monday, March 4
4	Clemson	61
3	NC State	84

== Awards and honors ==
Tournament MVP: Sharon Manning, NC State

All-Tournament teams:

First Team
- Sharon Manning, NC State

Second Team

== See also ==
- 1991 ACC men's basketball tournament
