= Double team (disambiguation) =

Double team ia a defensive strategy in basketball.

Double Team may also refer to:

- Double Team (film), a 1997 action movie starring Jean-Claude Van Damme, Dennis Rodman and Mickey Rourke
- Double Teamed (film), A 2002 Biographical sports drama about identical twin professional basketball players Heather and Heidi Burge.
- "Double Team" (song), a 2024 song by Anitta
- "Double Team", a song by Tenacious D from their 2001 album Tenacious D
- a specific variation of a threesome sexual behavior
