= Angela Taylor (basketball) =

US basketball executive

Angela Taylor (born 1971 or 1972) is an American retired basketball executive for the WNBA between the 1990s and 2010s. Taylor worked at the WNBA's New York City headquarters in multiple executive roles from 1997 to 2006, after she worked as an assistant coach for university basketball teams in the mid-1990s. Taylor worked in business development for the Minnesota Lynx as the vice president from 2006 to 2008. Taylor was the general manager for the Washington Mystics from October 2008 to October 2010, and for the Atlanta Dream from January 2014 to August 2016. Taylor moved to culinary tourism in 2016 after starting a business in Boise, Idaho.

== Early life and education ==
Angela Taylor was born in Mountain Home, Idaho, in the early 1970s. Her childhood dream was to join the National Basketball Association, and to work for the Chicago Bulls as the general manager. Taylor attended Stanford University during the early 1990s for a Bachelor of Economics degree. She played for the Stanford University team, that won the 1990 NCAA Division I women's basketball tournament, and the 1992 NCAA Division I women's basketball tournament. She was one of the team's captains in 1992. She graduated from Stanford in 1993. Taylor completed a Master of Business Administration in 2002 from the NYU Stern School of Business.

== Career ==
Taylor started her assistant basketball coaching career at the beginning of 1994 with the Arizona Wildcats women's basketball team as a graduate assistant. Taylor went to the Texas A&M Aggies women's basketball team in August 1994, in order to resume her assistant coaching tenure. Taylor started as an assistant coach in May 1995 for the Stanford Cardinal women's basketball team. She stayed with Stanford until 1997. Taylor became an executive for the Women's National Basketball Association headquarters in New York City, from 1997 until the middle of 2006. Her positions ranged from manager to senior director.

Taylor was hired by the Minnesota Lynx in July 2006, in order to become the new vice president of business development. Taylor succeeded Linda Hargrove, in October 2008, as the general manager for the Washington Mystics. Taylor also became the team's vice-president. She remained in her positions until she left the Mystics in October 2010. Taylor was in charge of a sports consulting firm, before returning to the WNBA in January 2014

Taylor replaced Fred Williams as the general manager for the Atlanta Dream, upon her return. She also ended up as the team's executive vice-president. Taylor was promoted to the job of president of the Dream in May 2014, and she kept her position as the general manager. Taylor ended her tenure with the Dream in August 2016. After leaving the Dream, Taylor created a culinary tourism business in 2016, Indulge Boise, which allows participants to taste food that is served in Boise, Idaho.
