= 1990–91 Connecticut Huskies women's basketball team =

Intercollegiate basketball season

1990–91 Connecticut Huskies women's basketball

Big East tournament champions Big East regular season champions

NCAA tournament, Final Four
- Conference: Big East Conference

Ranking
- Coaches: No. 4
- AP: No. 13
- Record: 29–5 (14–2 Big East)
- Head coach: Geno Auriemma (6th season)
- Associate head coach: Chris Dailey
- Assistant coach: Charlene Curtis
- Home arena: Harry A. Gampel Pavilion

1990–91 Big East Conference women's basketball standings
| | Conf. | | | | Overall |
| Team | W | | L | PCT | W | | L | PCT |
|---|---|---|---|---|---|---|---|---|
| No. 13 Connecticut † | 14 | – | 2 | .875 | 29 | – | 5 | .853 |
| No. 15 Providence | 13 | – | 3 | .813 | 26 | – | 6 | .813 |
| St. John's | 10 | – | 6 | .625 | 16 | – | 12 | .571 |
| Pittsburgh | 10 | – | 6 | .625 | 16 | – | 13 | .552 |
| Seton Hall | 7 | – | 9 | .438 | 18 | – | 11 | .621 |
| Boston College | 6 | – | 10 | .375 | 12 | – | 16 | .429 |
| Georgetown | 5 | – | 11 | .313 | 12 | – | 15 | .444 |
| Villanova | 4 | – | 12 | .250 | 12 | – | 17 | .414 |
| Syracuse | 3 | – | 13 | .188 | 7 | – | 21 | .250 |
† 1991 Big East Tournament winner Rankings from AP poll

The 1990–91 Connecticut Huskies women's basketball team represented the University of Connecticut (UConn) during the 1990–91 NCAA Division I women's basketball season. The Huskies, led by Hall of Fame head coach Geno Auriemma in his 6th season at UConn, played their home games at Harry A. Gampel Pavilion and were members of the Big East Conference.

UConn finished their regular season with a record of 23–4, including 14–2 in the Big East to win the conference regular season championship. They also won the Big East tournament. Then, they advanced to the Final Four of the NCAA Tournament, reaching the milestone for the first time in their storied program history.

== Roster ==
1990–91 UConn Huskies women's basketball team
Players
Coaches

| Pos. | # | Name | Height | Year | Previous school | Hometown |
|---|---|---|---|---|---|---|
| G | 5 | Debbie Baer | 5 ft 6 in (1.68 m) | Jr | Red Lion | Red Lion, PA |
| G | 10 | Laura Lishness | 5 ft 11 in (1.8 m) | Sr | Bristol Eastern | Bristol, CT |
| G/F | 14 | Tonya Boone | 5 ft 9 in (1.75 m) | So | Mount Saint Dominic Academy | Newark, NJ |
| G | 21 | Orly Grossman | 5 ft 11 in (1.8 m) | Jr | | Tel Aviv, Israel |
| F | 22 | Heidi Law | 6 ft 2 in (1.88 m) | Fr | | Harwinton, CT |
| F | 24 | Kerry Bascom | 6 ft 1 in (1.85 m) | Sr | Epping | Epping, NH |
| G | 31 | Wendy Davis | 5 ft 8 in (1.73 m) | Jr |
| F | 33 | Meghan Pattyson | 5 ft 10 in (1.78 m) | Jr | Central Bucks East |

Head coach

- Geno Auriemma

Assistant coach(es)

Legend

- (C) Team captain
- (S) Suspended
- (I) Ineligible
- (W) Walk-on
- Injured
- Current redshirt

== Schedule ==
| Date time, TV | Rank^{#} | Opponent^{#} | Result | Record | Site city, state |
Regular season
| Nov 23, 1990* | No. 24 | at Holy Cross | W 87–75 | 1–0 | Hart Center; Worcester, Massachusetts |
| Nov 29, 1990* | No. 23 | No. 11 Iowa | L 41–58 | 1–1 | Gampel Pavilion; Storrs, Connecticut |
| Dec 1, 1990* | No. 23 | vs. No. 9 Purdue | L 87–89 ^{OT} | 1–2 | Cameron Indoor Stadium; Durham, North Carolina |
| Dec 2, 1990* | No. 23 | vs. Harvard | W 96–55 | 2–2 | Cameron Indoor Stadium; Durham, North Carolina |
| Dec 5, 1990* | | Fairfield | W 93–74 | 3–2 | Gampel Pavilion; Storrs, Connecticut |
| Dec 8, 1990* | | Fordham | W 85–43 | 4–2 | Gampel Pavilion; Storrs, Connecticut |
| Dec 9, 1990* | | No. 2 Auburn | W 73–67 | 5–2 | Gampel Pavilion; Storrs, Connecticut |
| Dec 15, 1990* | No. 23 | Minnesota | W 85–60 | 6–2 | Gampel Pavilion; Storrs, Connecticut |
| Dec 23, 1990* | No. 24 | Hartford | W 57–43 | 7–2 | Gampel Pavilion; Storrs, Connecticut |
| Dec 31, 1990* | No. 20 | Iowa State | W 69–56 | 8–2 | Gampel Pavilion; Storrs, Connecticut |
| Jan 1, 1991 | No. 20 | Boston College | W 92–67 | 9–2 (1–0) | Gampel Pavilion; Storrs, Connecticut |
| Jan 5, 1991 | No. 20 | at Georgetown | W 86–61 | 10–2 (2–0) | McDonough Gymnasium; Washington, D.C. |
| Jan 7, 1991 | No. 18 | at Villanova | W 86–61 | 11–2 (3–0) | Palestra; Philadelphia, Pennsylvania |
| Jan 9, 1991 | No. 18 | St. John's | W 77–45 | 12–2 (4–0) | Gampel Pavilion; Storrs, Connecticut |
| Jan 12, 1991 | No. 18 | Seton Hall | W 79–57 | 13–2 (5–0) | Gampel Pavilion; Storrs, Connecticut |
| Jan 16, 1991 | No. 18 | at Syracuse | W 65–63 | 14–2 (6–0) | Syracuse, New York |
| Jan 23, 1991 | No. 17 | No. 19 Providence | W 86–84 | 15–2 (7–0) | Gampel Pavilion; Storrs, Connecticut |
| Jan 26, 1991 | No. 17 | Pittsburgh | L 59–61 | 15–3 (7–1) | Fitzgerald Field House; Pittsburgh, Pennsylvania |
| Jan 30, 1991 | No. 18 | Boston College | W 68–65 | 16–3 (8–1) | Conte Forum; Chestnut Hill, Massachusetts |
| Feb 2, 1991 | No. 18 | Georgetown | W 81–51 | 17–3 (9–1) | Gampel Pavilion; Storrs, Connecticut |
| Feb 6, 1991 | No. 16 | Villanova | W 63–40 | 18–3 (10–1) | Gampel Pavilion; Storrs, Connecticut |
| Feb 9, 1991 | No. 16 | at St. John's | W 80–66 | 19–3 (11–1) | Alumni Hall; New York, New York |
| Feb 13, 1991 | No. 15 | at Seton Hall | W 80–59 | 20–3 (12–1) | Walsh Gymnasium; South Orange, New Jersey |
| Feb 17, 1991 | No. 15 | Syracuse | W 85–49 | 21–3 (13–1) | Gampel Pavilion; Storrs, Connecticut |
| Feb 20, 1991* | No. 14 | Northeastern | W 86–55 | 22–3 | Gampel Pavilion; Storrs, Connecticut |
| Feb 23, 1991 | No. 14 | at No. 19 Providence | L 89–91 | 22–4 (13–2) | Alumni Hall; Providence, Rhode Island |
| Feb 25, 1991 | No. 13 | Pittsburgh | W 79–55 | 23–4 (14–2) | Gampel Pavilion; Storrs, Connecticut |
Big East tournament
| March 4, 1991* | (1) No. 13 | vs. (8) Villanova; Quarterfinals | W 64–47 | 24–4 | McDonough Gymnasium; Washington, D.C. |
| March 3, 1991* | (1) No. 13 | vs. (4) Seton Hall; Semifinals | W 69–54 | 25–4 | McDonough Gymnasium; Washington, D.C. |
| March 4, 1991* | (1) No. 13 | vs. (2) No. 16 Providence; Championship game | W 79–74 | 26–4 | McDonough Gymnasium; Washington, D.C. |
NCAA tournament
| March 16, 1991* | (3 E) No. 13 | (11 E) Toledo; Second round | W 81–80 | 27–4 | Gampel Pavilion (4,623); Storrs, Connecticut |
| March 21, 1991* | (3 E) No. 13 | vs. (2 E) No. 7 NC State; Regional Semifinal – Sweet Sixteen | W 82–71 | 28–4 | Palestra; Philadelphia, Pennsylvania |
| March 23, 1991* | (3 E) No. 13 | vs. (4 E) No. 21 Clemson; Regional Final – Elite Eight | W 60–57 | 29–4 | Palestra; Philadelphia, Pennsylvania |
| March 30, 1991* | (3 E) No. 13 | vs. (1 ME) No. 2 Virginia; National Semifinal – Final Four | L 55–61 | 29–5 | Lakefront Arena; New Orleans, Louisiana |
*Non-conference game. ^{#}Rankings from AP Poll. (#) Tournament seedings in parentheses. All times are in EST.

== Rankings ==
Ranking movements Legend: ██ Increase in ranking ██ Decrease in ranking — = Not ranked т = Tied with team above or below
| | Week | | | | | | | | | | | | | | | | | |
| Poll | Pre | 1 | 2 | 3 | 4 | 5 | 6 | 7 | 8 | 9 | 10 | 11 | 12 | 13 | 14 | 15 | 16 | Final |
|---|---|---|---|---|---|---|---|---|---|---|---|---|---|---|---|---|---|---|
| AP | 24 | 23 | — | 23 | 24 | 23 | 20 | 18 | 18 | 17 | 18 | 16 | 15 | 14 | 13 | 13 | 13 | Not released |
| Coaches | 25 | 25 | — | 23 | 24 | 23 | 20 т | 18 | 18 | 17 | 19 | 16 | 14 т | 14 | 16 | 14 | 13 | 4 |

== Awards and honors ==
- Kerry Bascom – Big East Player of the Year
