= Al Barbre =

American basketball coach (born 1942)

Biographical details
- Born: October 13, 1942 (age 84)
- Education: Lon Morris College; Stephen F. Austin

Coaching career (HC unless noted)
- c. 1960s: Jacksonville College
- c. 1960–'70s: Stephen F. Austin (Asst.)
- c. 1970s: Deweyville HS
- c. 1977–'80s: Bridge City HS
- c. 1980s: Lamar (Asst.)
- 1986–1991: Lamar

Head coaching record
- Overall: 82–62 (.569)

Accomplishments and honors

Awards
- American South Conference Co-Coach of the Year, 1988, 1989; American South Conference Coach of the Year, 1991; Converse District VI Coach of the Year, 1991

Al Barbre (born October 13, 1942) is an American former basketball coach. He has coached men's and women's basketball at the high school and college level. He served as an assistant coach for the Stephen F. Austin and Lamar men's basketball teams. At Stephen F. Austin, the Lumberjacks won 29 straight games in the 1969–70 season. He took over as the Lamar Lady Cardinals basketball head coach prior to the 1987–88 season. As head coach for the Lady Cardinals, his team's results improved each year. His 1990–91 team qualified for the 1991 NCAA Division I women's basketball tournament and defeated Texas, LSU, and Arkansas before losing to the eventual tournament champion finalist, Virginia Cavaliers, in the Elite Eight round. In addition to his coaching skills, he was a good recruiter.

At 29–4, his 1990–91 team holds the Lamar Lady Cardinals record for most wins in a season. The 1991 NCAA regional tournament game held on the Lady Cardinals' home court, the Montagne Center, against the LSU Lady Tigers set a Montagne Center attendance record for a women's basketball game with 9,143 fans in attendance.

== Honors and probation ==
As head coach for the Lady Cardinals, Al Barbe was named American South Conference Co-coach of the Year in 1988 and 1989. In 1991, he was named American South Conference Coach of the Year and Converse District VI Coach of the Year.

Following an NCAA investigation, all wins for the 1990–91 season were vacated due to violations by the program. In addition, the program was placed on two years' probation and the number of allowed scholarships was reduced during the probation period. Al Barbre resigned as head coach. Barbre did not coach at the collegiate level again following his resignation in 1992.

=== Head coaching record ===
Record table
Season	Team	Overall	Conference	Standing	Postseason
Lamar (American South Conference) (1987–1991)
1987–88	Lamar	14–14	4–5		
1988–89	Lamar	18–10	6–4		
1989–90	Lamar	19–10	7–3		
1990–91	Lamar	29*–4	12*–0	1st	NCAA (Elite Eight)
Lamar:		82–62 (.569)	30–23 (.566)		
Total:		82–62 (.569)			
National champion Postseason invitational champion Conference regular season champion Conference regular season and conference tournament champion Division regular season champion Division regular season and conference tournament champion Conference tournament champion

* 1990–91 wins vacated by the NCAA
