= Tonya Cardoza =

American basketball coach

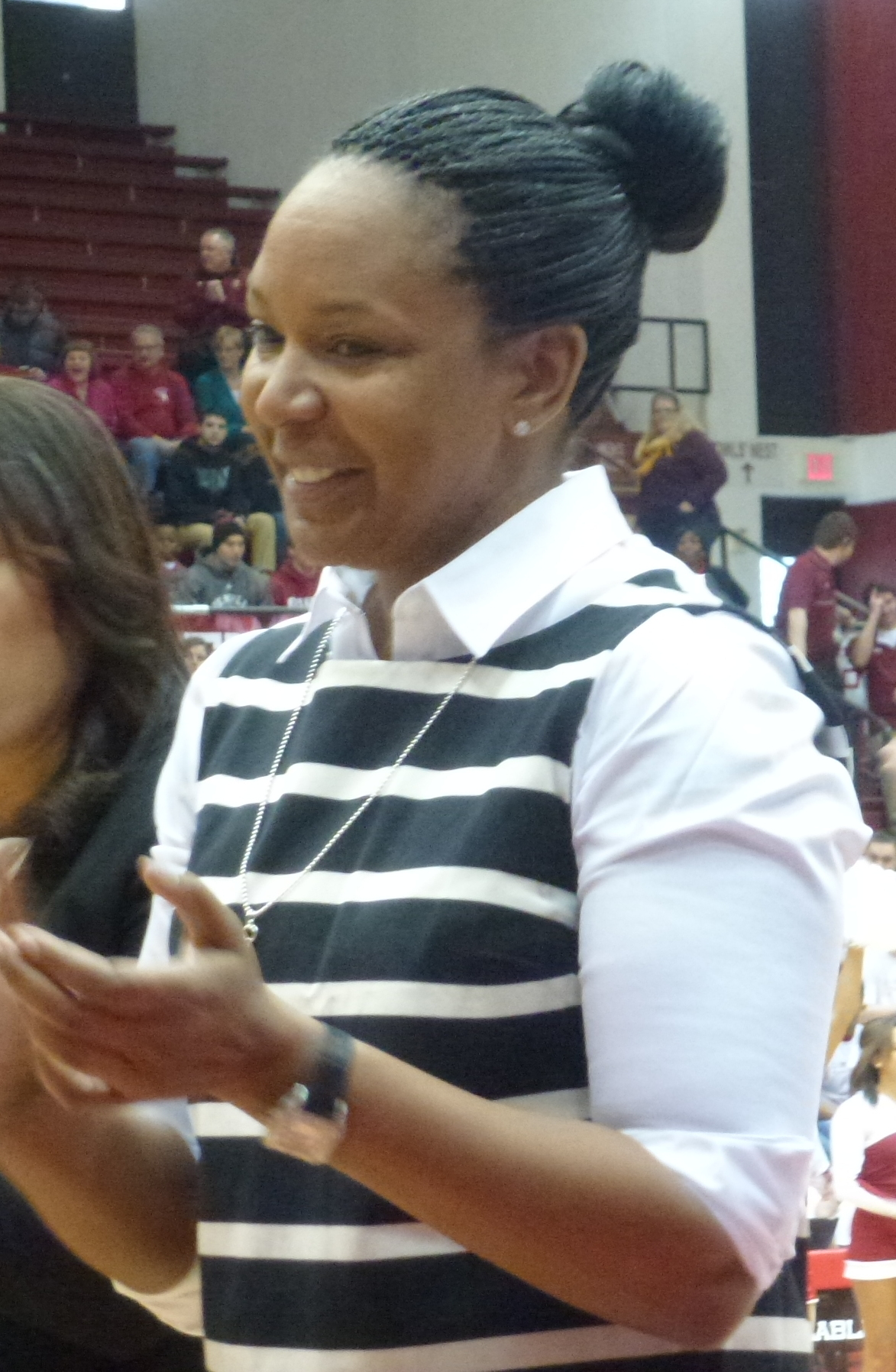
- Cardoza in 2015

Current position
- Title: Assistant coach
- Team: Connecticut
- Conference: Big East

Biographical details
- Born: April 2, 1968 (age 58); Roxbury, Massachusetts, U.S.

Playing career
- 1987–1991: Virginia

Coaching career (HC unless noted)
- 1994–2008: Connecticut (asst.)
- 2008–2022: Temple
- 2023–present: Connecticut (asst.)

Head coaching record
- Overall: 251–188 (.572)

Tonya Maria Cardoza (born April 2, 1968) is currently an assistant coach for the University of Connecticut's women's basketball team and the former head coach of the Temple University women's basketball team. She previously played basketball for the University of Virginia 1988–1991, and prior to being the head coach at Temple, worked as an assistant coach at the University of Connecticut for fourteen seasons.

== Early years ==
Cardoza grew up in Roxbury, Massachusetts, near Boston, where she played high school basketball at Boston English High, where she earned all-state player honors.

== Virginia ==
Cardoza played for the Virginia Cavaliers between 1987 and 1991. She graduated in 1991 with a degree in anthropology. The team won the Atlantic Coast Conference regular season in 1987, 1988 and 1991. She was named captain her senior year, led the team in scoring with 15.5 points per games, and helped the team reach the 1991 NCAA Women's Division I Basketball Tournament Final Four, where they beat the Connecticut Huskies in the semifinal, then lost in overtime in the championship game. Cardoza was named to the Final Four All-Tournament team along with teammate Dawn Staley.

Cardoza is the holder of several records at Virginia, including:

- Career blocks (110) fifth place
- Season rebounding leader (6.1) 1991 (tied with Staley)
- Career free throws made (338) seventh place
- Career Field Goal percentage (.478) eighth place
- Season Field Goal percentage (.469) 1989
- Season Field Goal percentage (.544) 1991
- Career points (1622) tenth place

Cardoza scored 35 points in a game against Fordham on December 28, 1988.

== Professional ==
Cardoza briefly played in 1992 as a professional basketball player in Segovia, Spain following her graduation from Virginia.

== USA Basketball ==
Cardoza was selected by USA Basketball to play on the U.S. Olympic Festival East team in 1987. The team played four games; in the final game Cardoza scored 13 to help the team win the bronze medal at the event.

== Connecticut ==
Cardoza was hired as an assistant coach prior to the 1994–95 season. The Huskies went on to win their first national championship in her first year on the bench.

Cardoza was an accomplished assessor of talent. In 2002, Maria Conlon was the only player from Connecticut on the UConn roster. Head coach Auriemma was not convinced she could be "counted on to contribute on a meaningful level". However, Cardoza shared her assessment with the head coach, "You're looking at our starting point guard next year". Conlon would go on to be the starting point guard for the next two seasons, and helped lead the Huskies to a National Championships in 2004, dishing out six assists and recording zero turnovers in 39 minutes of the championship game.

== Temple ==
Cardoza became the head coach of Temple for the 2008-2009 season after Dawn Staley, a Virginia teammate of Cardoza, left the Temple head coaching position to become the head coach at the University of South Carolina.

She guided the Owls to the NCAA tournament in her first three seasons at the helm, twice reaching the second round. In 2012, despite a second place finish in the Atlantic 10, the Owls settled for the Women’s NIT. Temple failed to reach the postseason following the 2012-2013 season, their last in the Atlantic 10.

Following the 2013 season, Temple transitioned to the American Athletic Conference, which was a step up in competition. Over the next eight seasons under Cardoza’s leadership, the Owls would earn only one more NCAA tournament appearance, bowing out in the first round of the 2017 competition.

On March 22, 2022, Temple announced that Cardoza would not return for the 2022–23 season. She finished her career as Temple's all-time winningest coach with a record of 251-188.

== Coaching record ==
Record table
Season	Team	Overall	Conference	Standing	Postseason
Temple Owls (Atlantic Ten) (2008–2013)
2008–09	Temple	21–10	11–3	T-2nd	NCAA First round
2009–10	Temple	25–9	11–3	T-2nd	NCAA Second round
2010–11	Temple	24–9	13–1	2nd	NCAA Second round
2011–12	Temple	23–10	13–1	2nd	WNIT Third Round
2012–13	Temple	14–18	5–9	T-10th	
Temple Owls (American Athletic Conference) (2013–2014)
2013–14	Temple	14–16	8–10	T-5th	
2014–15	Temple	20–17	12–6	T-3rd	WNIT Semifinal
2015–16	Temple	23–12	13–5	3rd	WNIT Quarterfinal
2016–17	Temple	24–8	11–2	2nd	NCAA 1st Round
2017–18	Temple	12–19	3–13	T-11th	
2018–19	Temple	11–19	7–9	T–5th	
2019–20	Temple	16–15	7–9	T–6th	
2020–21	Temple	11–11	11–7	5th	
2021–22	Temple	13–15	8–8	4th	
Temple:		251–188 (.572)	133–86 (.607)		
Total:		251–188 (.572)			
National champion Postseason invitational champion Conference regular season champion Conference regular season and conference tournament champion Division regular season champion Division regular season and conference tournament champion Conference tournament champion

== Awards and honors ==
- 2011 Atlantic 10 Coach of the Year
- 2011 Big Five coach of the year
- 2010 Big Five coach of the year
- 2009 Big Five coach of the year
- 2017 American Athletic Conference Coach of the year
