= Heather Burge =

American basketball player

Heather Burge Quella

Personal information
- Born: November 12, 1971 (age 55) Harbor City, California, U.S.
- Listed height: 6 ft 5 in (1.96 m)
- Listed weight: 195 lb (88 kg)

Career information
- High school: Palos Verdes (Palos Verdes Estates, California)
- College: Virginia (1989–1993)
- Position: Center

Career history
- 1999: Sacramento Monarchs

Career highlights
- ACC Player of the Year (1993); ACC Tournament MVP (1993); 2× First-team All-ACC (1992, 1993)
- Stats at Basketball Reference
Medals
Jones Cup
Gold medal – first place	1992 Taipei	Team competition

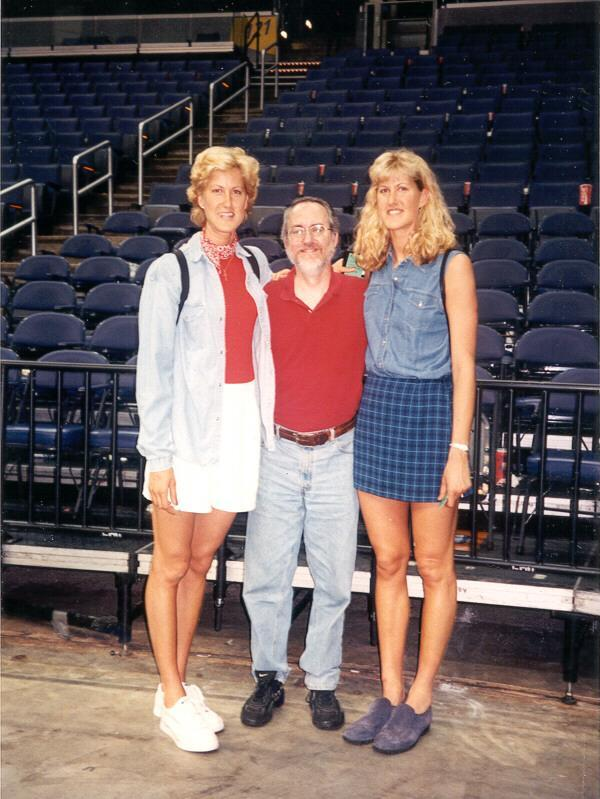
Heidi Burge (left) and Heather Burge (right) with a fan in 1999.

Heather Marie Quella (née Burge; November 12, 1971) is an American former professional basketball player who played overseas for eight seasons and then played for the Sacramento Monarchs of the WNBA in 1999. She is the twin sister of Heidi (Burge) Horton.

== Early life ==
Prior to starting high school, the Burge family moved to Palos Verdes Estates, California so that the sisters could attend Palos Verdes High School. Burge helped bring success to the team, transforming the Sea Kings into Southern Section 3-A champions in 1987 and concluding her high school career atop the school's all-time list of girls' scorers with 1,345 points. Burge played inside against the opposing teams' centers and was the go-to scorer in the paint Heidi and Heather Burge helped the Cavaliers to 3 consecutive Atlantic Coast Championships and 3 consecutive Final Four appearances in 1990, '91 and '92. During the summers, both played for USA Basketball: Heather, making the Women's National Team (1993 Champions of The World Cup Qualifying Tourney in Sao Paulo, Brazil). Heidi played with the Women's Select team (1993 representing the US in Bremen, Germany).

== College career ==
UVA would win right away with Burge averaging 12.2 points and 6.7 rebounds a game her freshman year and the pair playing a big part in leading the team to the school's first three, and to date only, Atlantic Coast Conference championships (in 1990, 1992 and 1993) and Women's NCAA Final Four appearances (1990–1992). Following the school year in 1989 and 1990, Burge was asked to play for USA Basketball U18 and U19 basketball teams and won a gold medal at the 1990 US Olympic Festival. Things did not always go smoothly for the Burges in their freshman and sophomore seasons as the pair were frequently in foul trouble, rarely played at the same time on the court (due to their foul situation), fought with teammates and each other, and were considered by their teammates to be both "soft" and prone to mistakes and turnovers.

However, during their time with UVA, the pair averaged 24 points and seven rebounds per game and teamed with NCAA All-Americans Dawn Staley and Tammi Reiss to lead the Cavaliers to three consecutive Final Fours and a 1991 overtime loss to Tennessee in the championship game. In all three trips to the Final Four, the Cavaliers lost to the eventual NCAA Champion (losing to Stanford in 1990 and 1992). Virginia's 1992 campaign ended with a school-record 32 wins (32-2, 15-1 in the ACC) and the team was ranked #1 in the Associated Press Poll and second in the USA Today Coaches Poll at the end of the regular season. In 1993, Virginia lost in the East Region Championship to NCAA runner-up Ohio State. The Lady Cavs lost all four tournament games by a total of only 15 points with the biggest score differential being their 9-point loss to Stanford in 1990.

While at UVA, Burge was the ACC Player of the Year and a Kodak District All-American in 1993 and was also a two-time Academic All-American (1992 & 1993), a two-time ACC All-Conference selectee (1992 & 1993), a two-time selectee to the NCAA All-Tournament team (1992 & 1993), and a three-year member of the ACC Academic Honor Roll (1991–1993). As of May 2011, Burge is first all-time for the Lady Cavs in career blocked shots with 152, in free throw attempts with 640, and in games played with 135, second in career rebounds with 955, third in career scoring with 2,058 points, sixth in career double-double's with 30, and 10th in free throws made with 326. She is also 13th all-time in the ACC in scoring.

Heather and friend near Palos Verdes Estates, CA in 1998

== WNBA career ==
After graduating with a bachelor's degree with a dual major in Spanish and Drama, Burge first played on the 1993 USA National Team and then played professionally for eight years overseas. Following her time overseas, Burge accepted an offer to play in the infant Women's National Basketball Association (WNBA) for the Sacramento Monarchs in 1999 (one year after sister Heidi had ended her two-year WNBA career). In her season with the team, she played little and was only on the court for a total of 28 minutes spread over 13 games. However, the team played well, finishing the season 19–13 and in third place in the Western Conference, but lost a one-game first round playoff game to the Los Angeles Sparks. After a single year playing with the Monarchs, she chose to return overseas and accepted an offer to play for the ESBVA team in Lille, France. However, she retired after the 2001 season due to lingering injuries. Upon retirement, one of Burge's biggest professional disappointments was that she was never able to either play with or against Heidi.

== USA Basketball ==
Burge was named to the USA team competing in the 1992 William Jones Cup competition in Taipei, Taiwan. The team won all eight games and won the gold medal. Burge averaged 4.5 points per game. In the summer of 1993, made the final cut for the USA Women's National team, competing down in Brazil to win the World Cup Qualifier. In the fall, began her pro career overseas in Clermont-Ferrand, France on the Stade Clermontois Assoc du Basquet club which placed 5th in the championship. The next 4 years before the WNBA was formed, she played in France, Hungary, Australia, Spain and all over Europe in the Euroleague Championship.

Heather Burge in action photo

== Post-retirement ==
After retiring from basketball on June 1, 2001, Burge stayed in California and taught 8th grade Spanish at Miraleste Intermediate School in Palos Verdes, CA. She later received a master's degree in Multi-Lingual Education. She then became a stay-at-home mom with her husband, Darren Quella, to raise their three children in Los Angeles. During that time, she also teamed up with San Pedro High School boys basketball coach John Bobich to run a youth basketball camps in San Pedro, CA. In 2017, she resumed teaching as her youngest son went to Christ Lutheran School and her two eldest are attending Port of Los Angeles High School. She developed a Spanish PE curriculum rooted in music and motion, and continues to teach 4-14 year olds at Christ Lutheran School in Rancho Palos Verdes, while running basketball camps with Integrity Hoops Academy.

At 6 feet 5 inches each, the pair were recognized in 1991 by Guinness World Records as the world's tallest female twins. This record was broken in 2004 by Ann and Claire Recht. The Disney television movie, Double Teamed, which was released in 2002, is based on their life stories and achievements in high school basketball. In the movie, Burge is played by actress Poppi Monroe. Burge has a small part in the 2002 film Juwanna Mann starring Vivica A. Fox. She plays the character "Magda Rowonowitch" and is credited as Heather Quella.

In September 2002, Burge was named to the Atlantic Coast Conference 50th Anniversary Women's Basketball Team. Included in the team were seven other members who played for the University of Virginia: Val Ackerman (who played for Virginia from 1978–81), Tonya Cardoza (1987–91), Dena Evans (1990–93), Donna Holt (1985–88), Wendy Palmer (1993–96), Tammi Reiss (1989–92), and Dawn Staley (1989–92).

== Career statistics ==
=== WNBA ===
==== Regular season ====
Year	Team	GP	GS	MPG	FG%	3P%	FT%	RPG	APG	SPG	BPG	TO	PPG
1999	Sacramento	13	0	2.2	42.9	0.0	20.0	0.4	0.7	0.0	0.2	0.4	0.5
Career	1 year, 1 team	13	0	2.2	42.9	0.0	20.0	0.4	0.7	0.0	0.2	0.4	0.5

=== College ===
Year	Team	GP	GS	MPG	FG%	3P%	FT%	RPG	APG	SPG	BPG	TO	PPG
1989–90	Virginia	35	-	-	47.4	0.0	53.5	6.7	0.5	-	0.9	-	12.2
1990–91	Virginia	34	-	-	51.7	0.0	54.2	5.6	0.5	1.3	0.9	-	12.7
1991–92	Virginia	34	-	-	55.4	0.0	46.9	8.4	1.1	1.0	1.2	-	17.2
1992–93	Virginia	32	-	-	62.3	0.0	50.0	7.7	1.2	1.7	1.5	-	19.1
Career		135	-	-	54.6	0.0	50.9	7.1	0.8	1.3	1.1	-	15.2
Statistics retrieved from Sports-Reference.

== See also ==
- List of twins
- List of University of Virginia people
