= 1990–91 Tennessee Lady Volunteers basketball team =

Intercollegiate basketball season

1990–91 Tennessee Lady Volunteers basketball

NCAA tournament National Champions
- Conference: Southeastern Conference

Ranking
- Coaches: No. 1
- AP: No. 4
- Record: 30–5 (6–3 SEC)
- Head coach: Pat Summitt (17th season)
- Assistant coaches: Mickie DeMoss; Holly Warlick
- Home arena: Thompson-Boling Arena

1990–91 SEC women's basketball standings
	Conf.				Overall
Team	W		L	PCT	W		L	PCT
No. 3 Georgia	9	–	0	1.000	28	–	4	.875
No. 6 Auburn	7	–	2	.778	26	–	6	.813
No. 4 Tennessee	6	–	3	.667	30	–	5	.857
No. 8 LSU^{†}	5	–	4	.556	24	–	7	.774
Kentucky	4	–	5	.444	20	–	9	.690
Ole Miss	4	–	5	.444	20	–	9	.690
Vanderbilt	4	–	5	.444	19	–	12	.613
Florida	3	–	6	.333	17	–	11	.607
Alabama	3	–	6	.333	17	–	12	.586
Mississippi State	0	–	9	.000	7	–	20	.259
† 1991 SEC tournament winner Rankings from AP poll

The 1990–91 Tennessee Lady Volunteers basketball team represented the University of Tennessee as a member of the Southeastern Conference during the 1990–91 women's college basketball season. Coached by Pat Summitt, the Lady Volunteers finished 30–5 and won their third national championship in a 5-year span. The Lady Vols started off the season ranked number six.

== Roster ==
1990–91 Tennessee Lady Volunteers women's basketball team
Players
Coaches

Pos.	#	Name	Height	Year	Previous school	Hometown
G	3	Jody Adams	5 ft 4 in (1.63 m)	So		Cleveland, Tennessee
G	11	Dena Head	5 ft 10 in (1.78 m)	Jr	Salem	Canton, Michigan
F	21	Lisa Harrison	6 ft 0 in (1.83 m)	So	Southern	Louisville, Kentucky
F/C	15	Marlene Jeter	6 ft 1 in (1.85 m)	So		Carlisle, South Carolina
C	32	Daedra Charles	6 ft 3 in (1.91 m)	Sr	Saint Martin de Porres	Detroit, Michigan
G	33	Nikki Caldwell	5 ft 10 in (1.78 m)	Fr	Oak Ridge	Oak Ridge, Tennessee

Head coach

- Pat Summitt

Assistant coach(es)

- Mickie DeMoss
- Holly Warlick

Legend

- (C) Team captain
- (S) Suspended
- (I) Ineligible
- (W) Walk-on
- Injured
- Current redshirt

Roster

== Schedule and results ==
Date time, TV	Rank^{#}	Opponent^{#}	Result	Record	Site city, state
Regular season
Nov 25, 1990*	No. 6	No. 2 Stanford	W 95–80	1–0	Thompson–Boling Arena; Knoxville, Tennessee
Nov 25, 1990*	No. 6	No. 7 NC State	L 77–90	1–1	Reynolds Coliseum; Raleigh, North Carolina
Dec 29, 1990*	No. 7	vs. Ohio State; Hilton Head Super Shootout	W 85–69	7–2	Hilton Head, South Carolina
Dec 30, 1990*	No. 7	vs. No. 8 Stanford; Hilton Head Super Shootout	W 84–77	8–2	Hilton Head, South Carolina
SEC tournament
NCAA tournament
Mar 17, 1991*	(1 ME) No. 4	(8 ME) SW Missouri State; Second round	W 55–47	26–5	Thompson–Boling Arena; Knoxville, Tennessee
Mar 21, 1991*	(1 ME) No. 4	(4 ME) No. 10 Western Kentucky; Regional Semifinal – Sweet Sixteen	W 68–61	27–5	Thompson–Boling Arena; Knoxville, Tennessee
Mar 23, 1991*	(1 ME) No. 4	(3 ME) No. 6 Auburn; Regional Final – Elite Eight	W 69–65	28–5	Thompson–Boling Arena; Knoxville, Tennessee
March 30, 1991*	(1 ME) No. 4	vs. (2 W) No. 11 Stanford; National Semifinal – Final Four	W 68–60	29–5	Lakefront Arena; New Orleans, Louisiana
March 31, 1991*	(1 ME) No. 4	vs. (1 MW) No. 2 Virginia; National Championship	W 70–67 ^{OT}	30–5	Lakefront Arena; New Orleans, Louisiana
*Non-conference game. ^{#}Rankings from AP Poll. (#) Tournament seedings in parentheses. ME=Mideast.
