= Debbie Ryan =

American basketball coach (born 1952)

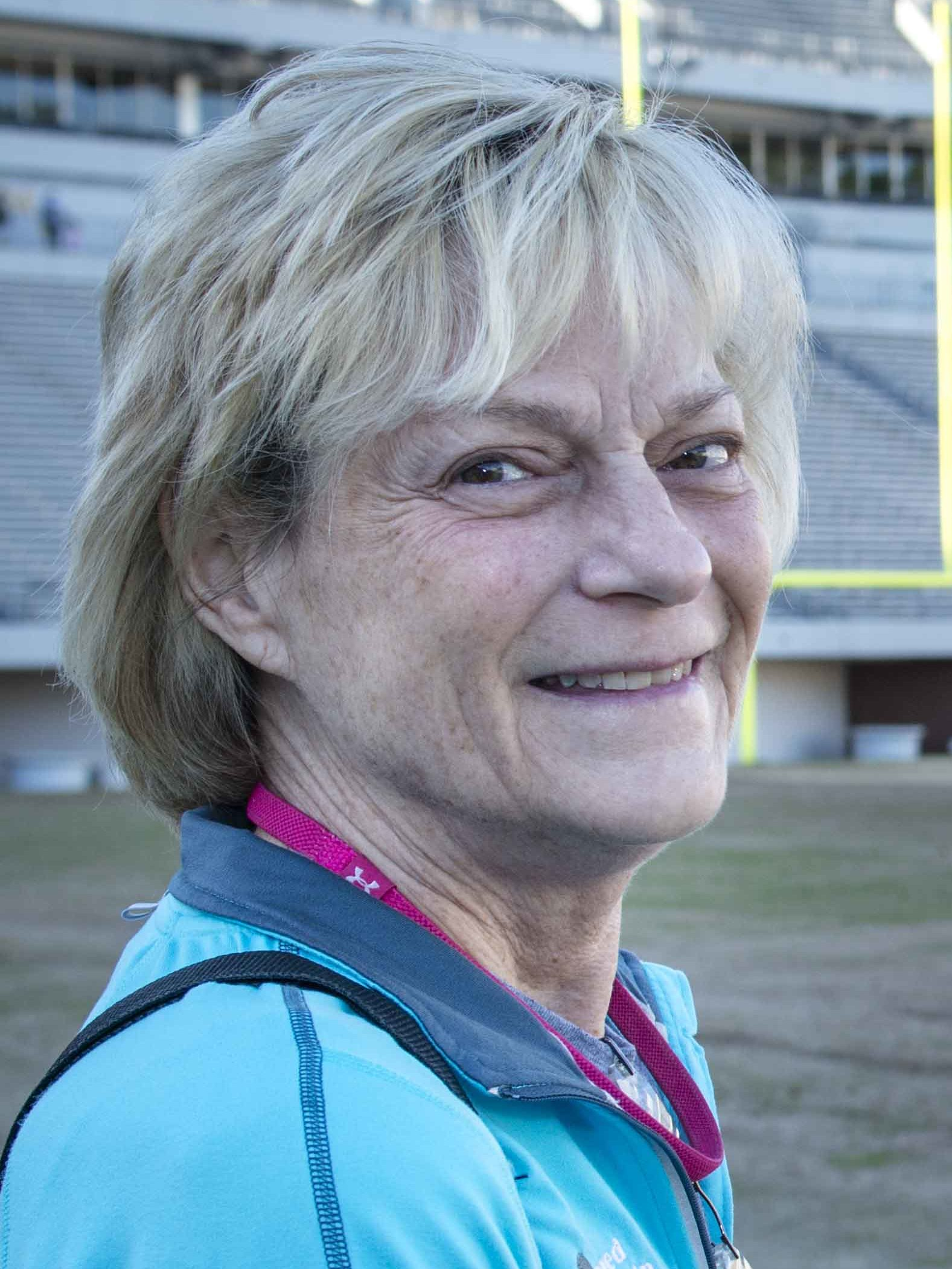
- Ryan in 2014

Biographical details
- Born: November 4, 1952 (age 73); Titusville, New Jersey, U.S.

Playing career
- 1971–1975: Ursinus
- Position: Point guard

Coaching career (HC unless noted)
- 1977–2011: Virginia

Head coaching record
- Overall: 739–324 (.695)
- Bowls: 56
- Tournaments: 69

Accomplishments and honors

Championships
- 3× NCAA Regional—Final Four (1990, 1991, 1992); 11× ACC regular season champion (1984, 1986–1988, 1991–1996, 2000); 3× ACC tournament champion (1990, 1992, 1993)

Awards
- 7× ACC Coach of the Year (1984, 1985, 1987, 1991, 1993, 1995, 2000); Naismith College Coach of the Year (1991)
- Women's Basketball Hall of Fame
Medal record
Women's basketball
Head coach for United States
World University Games
| Gold medal – first place | 2001 Beijing | Team competition |
Pan American Games
| Silver medal – second place | 2003 Santo Domingo | Team competition |

Debbie Ryan (born November 4, 1952) is an American former women's basketball coach who coached at the University of Virginia. Ryan also coached the American women's basketball team at the 2003 Pan American Games. She was diagnosed with pancreatic cancer in 2000 but is currently in remission. She was inducted into the Women's Basketball Hall of Fame in 2008. Ryan was also inducted into the Virginia Sports Hall of Fame in 2012.

The US Basketball Writers Association (USBWA) awarded her the Coach of the Year award in 1991. She was also named the Naismith College Coach of the Year.

Ryan started as an assistant coach at Virginia under head coach Dan Bonner. In 1977, Ryan, who had recently completed graduate school in Virginia, was asked to become the head coach of the women's basketball program. She accepted, to become only the third head coach in the program's history. Ryan resigned after 34 years of head coaching duties at UVA at the completion the women's 2010–11 basketball season. After her resignation, Ryan was a volunteer assistant coach of Seattle Storm for the 2011 WNBA season, reuniting with her former player Jenny Boucek, who is an assistant coach there. In 2014, Ryan was honored as one of the Library of Virginia's "Virginia Women in History" for her contributions to women's basketball and her actions as a cancer treatment advocate.

== US basketball ==
Ryan served as the head coach of the US representative to the 1999 World University Games (also known as the Universiade). The event was held in Palma de Mallorca, Spain. The US team opened with a 134–37 win over South Africa. The second game was against Canada, which the US team lost in a close match 68–67. The US could not afford to lose another game if they wished to win a medal, and won the next game against Japan 106–66. They next faced undefeated Russia, and fell behind by twelve points at halftime, but came back and won 79–68. The US fell behind in their next game against undefeated China, but rallied and went on to win 89–78. They beat Brazil to advance to the semi-final, where they faced Lithuania. The game was not close, with the US winning 70–49. That set up a rematch with China, on their home court with 18,000 spectators. The USA only had a four-point lead at halftime, but did better in the second half, and won 87–69 to claim the gold medal.

== Head coaching record ==
Record table
| Season | Team | Overall | Conference | Standing | Postseason |
|---|---|---|---|---|---|
Virginia (ACC) (1977–2011)
| 1977–78 | Virginia | 8–17 | 1–5 | 6th | |
| 1978–79 | Virginia | 16–12 | 2–4 | 6th | |
| 1979–80 | Virginia | 20–12 | 3–5 | 6th | WNIT Second Round |
| 1980–81 | Virginia | 22–10 | 5–2 | 4th | AIAW First Round |
| 1981–82 | Virginia | 17–11 | 2–5 | 5th | |
| 1982–83 | Virginia | 15–13 | 4–9 | 6th | |
| 1983–84 | Virginia | 22–7 | 11–3 | 1st | NCAA First Round |
| 1984–85 | Virginia | 21–8 | 9–5 | 3rd | NCAA First Round |
| 1985–86 | Virginia | 26–3 | 13–1 | 1st | NCAA First Round |
| 1986–87 | Virginia | 26–5 | 12–2 | 1st | NCAA Sweet 16 |
| 1987–88 | Virginia | 27–5 | 12–2 | T-1st | NCAA Elite 8 |
| 1988–89 | Virginia | 21–10 | 8–6 | 4th | NCAA Sweet 16 |
| 1989–90 | Virginia | 29–6 | 11–3 | 2nd | NCAA Final Four |
| 1990–91 | Virginia | 31–3 | 14–0 | 1st | NCAA Runner-Up |
| 1991–92 | Virginia | 32–2 | 15–1 | 1st | NCAA Final Four |
| 1992–93 | Virginia | 26–6 | 13–3 | 1st | NCAA Elite Eight |
| 1993–94 | Virginia | 27–5 | 15–1 | 1st | NCAA Sweet 16 |
| 1994–95 | Virginia | 27–5 | 16–0 | 1st | NCAA Elite Eight |
| 1995–96 | Virginia | 26–7 | 13–3 | 1st | NCAA Elite Eight |
| 1996–97 | Virginia | 23–8 | 12–4 | 2nd | NCAA Sweet 16 |
| 1997–98 | Virginia | 19–10 | 9–7 | 5th | NCAA Second Round |
| 1998–99 | Virginia | 20–9 | 12–4 | 2nd | NCAA First Round |
| 1999–00 | Virginia | 25–9 | 13–3 | 1st | NCAA Sweet 16 |
| 2000–01 | Virginia | 18–14 | 8–8 | 5th | NCAA First Round |
| 2001–02 | Virginia | 17–13 | 9–7 | T-3rd | NCAA First Round |
| 2002–03 | Virginia | 17–14 | 9–7 | 3rd | NCAA Second Round |
| 2003–04 | Virginia | 13–16 | 6–9 | 7th | |
| 2004–05 | Virginia | 21–11 | 8–6 | 5th | NCAA Second Round |
| 2005–06 | Virginia | 20–12 | 5–9 | 9th | WNIT Quarterfinals |
| 2006–07 | Virginia | 19–15 | 5–9 | 8th | WNIT Quarterfinals |
| 2007–08 | Virginia | 24–10 | 10–4 | T-3rd | NCAA Second Round |
| 2008–09 | Virginia | 24–10 | 8–6 | T-5th | NCAA Second Round |
| 2009–10 | Virginia | 21–10 | 9–5 | 3rd | NCAA First Round |
| 2010–11 | Virginia | 19–16 | 5–7 | 8th | WNIT Quarterfinals |
| Virginia: | | 739–324 (.694) | 160–92 (.635) | | |
| Total: | | 739–324 (.694) | | | |
National champion Postseason invitational champion Conference regular season champion Conference regular season and conference tournament champion Division regular season champion Division regular season and conference tournament champion Conference tournament champion

== See also ==
- List of college women's basketball career coaching wins leaders
- Virginia Cavaliers basketball
