= Double Teamed =

Disney Channel Movie

- Promotional advertisement
- Written by: Douglas Penn; John Wierick
- Directed by: Duwayne Dunham
- Starring: Poppi Monroe; Annie McElwain
- Theme music composer: Phil Marshall
- Country of origin: United States
- Original language: English

Production
- Producer: Don Schain
- Cinematography: Bob Seaman
- Editor: Terry Blythe
- Running time: 105 minutes
- Production company: Just Singer Entertainment

Original release
- Network: Disney Channel
- Release: January 18, 2002

Double Teamed is a 2002 American biographical sports drama film released as a Disney Channel Original Movie and based on the life stories of identical twin professional basketball players Heather and Heidi Burge. The film premiered on January 18, 2002.

== Plot ==
In 1985, fourteen-year-old identical twins Heather and Heidi Burge are forced by their overly-pushy father to leave their former school and attend a different school to have better chances at college scholarships. Heidi, however, tended to think that she was athletically inferior to Heather, and in an attempt to get out of Heather's shadow, she joined in a school play.

Heather and Heidi are both attending the school to play volleyball rather than basketball, but the girls' basketball coach notices Heather because of her height. She seizes this opportunity to play basketball to help her train for the coming volleyball season. Heather meets Nicky Williams, the star of the Palos Verdes High School Sea Kings. Heidi, in the meantime, learns that her father told the coach that both of the girls would play on the basketball team, despite the fact that Heidi had already committed to performing in a school play.

Heather and Heidi are both furious over the situation—Heather because she didn't want Heidi on the team and Heidi because she thought Heather put their father up to it. Heidi wanted to be independent of Heather and pursue her own interests.

When the twins first start playing for the Sea Kings, they leave a bad impression on the team by lying and implying that they are rich like many of their teammates. Heather and Nicky form a serious rivalry and Nicky even tries to run the Burge twins out of school by telling the school about the Burges' living situation.

They both eventually befriend Nicky when they see that her father is too preoccupied with business to attend her basketball games. At their first tournament in New York, they win second, and Heather wins MVP. However, in another game, Heidi is selected to take the game winning free throws. This makes Heather, the usual star, extremely jealous, so she later plays a late-night one-on-one game with Galen, a senior basketball star who lives in their apartment complex. While playing, Heather falls and severely twists her ankle, which prevents her from playing their next game. During that next game, while she's sitting out, Heather sees the need for teamwork rather than the need to be the "superstar" and decides to play again despite being injured. Her effort is rewarded, and with some clever teamwork, Heidi hits the game-winning basket for the Sea Kings.

After the game, their coach approaches the twins and their parents, Mary and Larry Burge, and tells Mr. and Mrs. Burge they should consider putting the girls in summer basketball camps, saying they have a very bright future. Mr. Burge proudly says that his girls are going to play college ball - but the coach says, "Maybe more. There's talk of a women's pro-league." Mr. Burge also apologizes for putting so much pressure on Heather and for forcing Heidi to play basketball in the first place. They forgive him. Mr. Burge says that Heidi has plans for a summer at a drama camp, which pleases her and reveals how important it is to be well-rounded.

A flashforward is then shown, and both Burge twins are playing on professional WNBA teams. Heidi plays for the Los Angeles Sparks and Heather plays for the Sacramento Monarchs. Heather and Heidi talk before the game, and Heather says, "Once second best, always second best." The game begins with a tip off and they both jump for the ball.

In reality, the twins' time in the WNBA did not overlap and they never faced each other in a WNBA game. Heidi retired after only playing two seasons in the WNBA in 1998. Heather would play in the WNBA in 1999 only for 13 games. Most of their professional careers had been overseas before the WNBA's first season in 1997.

== Cast ==
- Poppi Monroe as Heather Burge
- Annie McElwain as Heidi Burge
- Nick Searcy as Larry Burge
- Teal Redmann as Nicky Williams
- Chris Olivero as Galen Alderman
- Mackenzie Phillips as Mary Burge
- Iyari Limon as Zoe Gold
- Joey Miyashima as Wendall Yoshida
- Tanya Goott as Madison Stricklin
- Julia Andrews as Henley Burge
- Tammi Reiss as Volleyball Coach (Reiss was the Burge twins' teammate at University of Virginia)

== Reception ==
A reviewer for the Sun-Sentinel gave a mixed review for Double Teamed, saying it was "paint-by-the-numbers" but that the "happy, Disney-style ending is a slam-dunk."

== See also ==
- List of basketball films
