= 1990–91 NCAA Division I women's basketball rankings =

- Season: 1990–91
- NCAA Tournament: 1991
- Preseason No. 1: Virginia
- NCAA Tournament Champions: Tennessee
NCAA Division I women's basketball rankings


Two human polls comprise the 1990–91 NCAA Division I women's basketball rankings, the AP Poll and the Coaches Poll, in addition to various publications' preseason polls. The AP poll is currently a poll of sportswriters, while the USA Today Coaches' Poll is a poll of college coaches. The AP conducts polls weekly through the end of the regular season and conference play, while the Coaches poll conducts a final, post-NCAA tournament poll as well.

== Legend ==
–	No votes
(#)	Ranking

== AP Poll ==
Team	18-Nov	26-Nov	3-Dec	10-Dec	17-Dec	24-Dec	31-Dec	7-Jan	14-Jan	21-Jan	28-Jan	4-Feb	11-Feb	18-Feb	25-Feb	4-Mar	11-Mar
Penn St.	18	17	13	9	7	5	4	1	3	2	2	2	2	2	2	1	1
Virginia	1	1	1	1	1	1	1	2	1	1	1	1	1	1	1	2	2
Georgia	4	4	4	3	3	6	9	8	7	5	4	3	3	3	3	4	3
Tennessee	6	3	6	10	9	7	5	4	2	4	3	5	4	4	4	3	4
Purdue	9	9	9	4	5	4	3	7	8	6	5	4	6	6	6	5	5
Auburn	3	2	2	5	4	3	7	5	10	7	7	7	5	5	5	6	6
North Carolina St.	8	7	3	2	2	2	2	3	4	3	6	6	7	7	7	7	7
LSU	19	20	24	19	19	18	17	15	11	10	10	13	12	12	12	10	8
Arkansas	10	8	8	13	10	9	14	14	12	11	12	11	9	9	8	8	9
Western Ky.	–	–	–	–	25	24	21	17	16	13	11	10	8	8	11	11	10
Stanford	2	6	7	12	12	8	8	9	9	8	8	8	11	11	10	9	11
Washington	14	13	16	17	17	16	13	13	13	16	13	12	10	10	9	12	12
UConn	24	23	–	23	24	23	20	18	18	17	18	16	15	14	13	13	13
Stephen F. Austin	–	–	–	–	–	–	–	–	–	–	–	25	21	20	19	17	14
Providence	–	–	25	22	22	21	23	19	21	19	21	21	17	19	16	16	15
Texas	7	12	20	21	21	20	22	20	19	18	17	15	16	15	14	14	16
UNLV	17	16	14	14	14	10	6	6	5	12	16	17	18	17	15	15	17
Long Beach St.	12	10	11	11	15	15	19	22	25	24	–	–	24	23	23	21	18
Ole Miss	16	15	12	8	11	14	12	16	14	15	14	14	14	16	18	19	19
Rutgers	23	22	19	18	18	17	10	10	6	9	9	9	13	13	17	18	20
Clemson	21	19	17	16	16	19	16	12	17	21	20	19	23	24	–	22	21
Northwestern	15	14	10	6	8	12	11	11	15	14	15	18	19	18	20	20	22
Iowa	11	11	15	15	13	13	15	21	20	23	25	–	22	21	21	24	23
Lamar	–	–	–	–	–	–	–	–	–	–	23	–	–	–	25	23	24
Oklahoma St.	–	–	–	24	23	22	24	25	24	–	–	–	–	25	–	–	25
Cal St. Fullerton	–	–	–	–	–	–	–	–	–	–	–	24	–	–	–	–	–
Florida St.	–	–	–	–	–	–	–	–	–	25	22	22	25	–	–	–	–
George Washington	–	–	–	–	–	–	–	–	–	–	–	–	–	–	24	25	–
Louisiana Tech	5	5	5	7	6	11	18	23	23	22	–	–	–	–	–	–	–
Maryland	20	18	23	25	–	–	–	–	–	–	24	–	–	–	–	–	–
Michigan St.	–	–	–	–	–	–	–	–	–	–	–	23	–	–	–	–	–
Northern Ill.	–	–	18	20	20	25	–	–	–	–	–	–	–	–	–	–	–
Notre Dame	–	–	–	–	–	–	25	24	22	20	19	20	20	22	22	–	–
South Carolina	22	25	22	–	–	–	–	–	–	–	–	–	–	–	–	–	–
Southern California	25	24	21	–	–	–	–	–	–	–	–	–	–	–	–	–	–
Vanderbilt	13	21	–	–	–	–	–	–	–	–	–	–	–	–	–	–	–

== USA Today Coaches poll ==
Team	14-Nov	28-Nov	5-Dec	12-Dec	19-Dec	26-Dec	3-Jan	8-Jan	15-Jan	22-Jan	29-Jan	5-Feb	12-Feb	19-Feb	26-Feb	5-Mar	14-Mar	1-Apr
Tennessee	6	3	6	8	8	7	5	3	2	4	3	5	4	4	4	2	3	1
Virginia	1	1	1	1	1	1	1	2	1	1	1	1	1	1	1	3	2	2
Stanford	2	6	7	12	13	8	9	10	9	9	8	8	11	11	10	9	10	3
UConn	25	25	–	23	24	23	T20	18	18	17	19	16	T14	14	16	14	13	4
Auburn	3	2	2	4	4	3	7	5	10	6	6	7	5	5	5	6	6	5
Georgia	4	4	4	3	3	5	8	8	7	5	4	3	3	2	2	4	4	6
Lamar	–	–	–	–	–	–	–	–	–	–	24	–	–	–	–	–	–	7
Clemson	20	18	17	14	T15	18	T15	13	16	20	20	20	23	–	–	25	23	8
Penn St.	18	17	13	10	7	6	4	1	4	2	2	2	2	3	3	1	1	9
North Carolina St.	8	7	3	2	2	2	2	4	6	3	7	6	8	7	7	7	7	10
Western Ky.	–	–	–	–	25	25	19	17	15	13	11	10	7	8	11	11	11	11
Arkansas	10	8	8	13	10	11	14	14	12	11	12	11	9	T9	8	8	8	12
Washington	15	13	15	17	17	16	13	11	13	T15	13	12	10	T9	9	12	12	13
Purdue	9	9	9	5	5	4	3	7	8	7	5	4	6	6	6	5	5	14
James Madison	–	–	–	–	–	–	–	–	–	–	–	–	–	–	–	–	–	15
Oklahoma St.	–	–	–	24	23	22	T23	24	20	23	–	25	24	T24	24	24	24	16
Long Beach St.	12	10	10	11	T15	15	22	22	–	–	–	–	–	T24	23	21	19	17
LSU	17	20	24	19	19	19	18	15	11	10	10	13	12	12	12	10	9	18
Stephen F. Austin	–	–	–	–	–	–	–	–	–	–	–	24	21	19	18	17	14	19
Vanderbilt	11	22	–	25	–	–	25	–	–	–	–	–	–	–	–	–	–	20
Iowa	13	11	14	15	12	14	T15	19	21	25	T25	–	25	21	20	22	22	21
UNLV	19	16	16	16	14	13	6	6	5	12	14	17	17	16	14	15	17	22
Northwestern	14	15	11	6	9	10	11	12	17	T15	16	18	19	20	22	19	21	23
Providence	–	–	25	22	22	21	T23	21	23	21	21	21	18	18	17	16	15	24
Texas	7	12	20	21	20	20	T20	20	19	18	17	15	16	15	13	13	16	25
Florida St.	–	–	–	–	–	–	–	–	–	–	22	22	22	23	–	–	–	–
George Washington	–	–	–	–	–	–	–	–	–	–	–	–	–	–	25	–	–	–
Louisiana Tech	5	5	5	7	6	9	17	23	25	22	T25	–	–	–	–	–	–	–
Maryland	21	21	23	–	–	–	–	–	–	–	–	–	–	–	–	–	–	–
Michigan St.	–	–	–	–	–	–	–	–	24	24	23	23	–	–	–	–	25	–
Northern Ill.	–	–	19	20	21	24	–	–	–	–	–	–	–	–	–	–	–	–
Notre Dame	–	–	–	–	–	–	–	25	22	19	18	19	20	22	21	23	–	–
Ole Miss	16	14	12	9	11	12	12	16	14	14	15	14	T14	17	19	20	20	–
Rutgers	23	23	18	18	18	17	10	9	3	8	9	9	13	13	15	18	18	–
South Carolina	22	24	22	–	–	–	–	–	–	–	–	–	–	–	–	–	–	–
Southern California	24	19	21	–	–	–	–	–	–	–	–	–	–	–	–	–	–	–
