= Virginia Cavaliers women's basketball =

2026–27 Virginia Cavaliers women's basketball team
- University: University of Virginia
- Head coach: Aaron Roussell (1st season)
- Location: Charlottesville, Virginia
- Arena: John Paul Jones Arena (capacity: 14,858)
- Conference: Atlantic Coast Conference
- Nickname: Cavaliers
- Colors: Orange and blue

NCAA Division I tournament runner-up
- 1991
Other NCAA Division I tournament results
Final Four	1990, 1991, 1992
Elite Eight	1988, 1990, 1991, 1992, 1993, 1995, 1996
Sweet Sixteen	1987, 1988, 1989, 1990, 1991, 1992, 1993, 1994, 1995, 1996, 1997, 2000, 2026
Appearances	1984, 1985, 1986, 1987, 1988, 1989, 1990, 1991, 1992, 1993, 1994, 1995, 1996, 1997, 1998, 1999, 2000, 2001, 2002, 2003, 2005, 2008, 2009, 2010, 2018, 2026

Conference tournament champions
- 1990, 1992, 1993

Conference regular-season champions
- 1984, 1986, 1987, 1988, 1991, 1992, 1993, 1994, 1995, 1996, 2000

Uniforms
Home	Away	Alternate

The Virginia Cavaliers women's basketball team represents the University of Virginia in women's basketball. The school competes in the Atlantic Coast Conference in Division I of the National Collegiate Athletic Association (NCAA). The Cavaliers play home basketball games at John Paul Jones Arena in Charlottesville, Virginia. They are currently coached by Aaron Roussell, who was hired on April 7, 2026.

== Year by year results since 1990 ==
The Cavaliers reached the Final Four in three consecutive seasons, reaching the title game in 1991, losing 70–67 to Tennessee in overtime.

Season	Record	Conference record	Coach
1989–90	29–6	11–3 (2nd)	Debbie Ryan
1990–91	31–3	14–0 (1st)	Debbie Ryan
1991–92	32–2	15–1 (1st)	Debbie Ryan
1992–93	26–6	13–3 (1st)	Debbie Ryan
1993–94	27–5	15–1 (1st)	Debbie Ryan
1994–95	27–5	16–0 (1st)	Debbie Ryan
1995–96	26–7	13–3 (1st)	Debbie Ryan
1996–97	23–8	12–4 (2nd)	Debbie Ryan
1997–98	19–10	9–7 (5th)	Debbie Ryan
1998–99	20–9	12–4 (2nd)	Debbie Ryan
1999-00	25–9	13–3 (1st)	Debbie Ryan
2000–01	18–14	8–8 (5th)	Debbie Ryan
2001–02	17–13	9–7 (T-3rd)	Debbie Ryan
2002–03	17–14	9–7 (3rd)	Debbie Ryan
2003–04	13–16	6–10 (7th)	Debbie Ryan
2004–05	21–11	8–6 (5th)	Debbie Ryan
2005–06	20–12	5–9 (9th)	Debbie Ryan
2006–07	19–15	5–9 (8th)	Debbie Ryan
2007–08	24–10	10–4 (T-3rd)	Debbie Ryan
2008–09	24–10	8–6 (T-5th)	Debbie Ryan
2009–10	21–10	9–5 (3rd)	Debbie Ryan
2010–11	19–16	5–9 (T-8th)	Debbie Ryan
2011–12	25–11	9–7 (T-5th)	Joanne Boyle
2012–13	16–14	8–10 (6th)	Joanne Boyle
2013–14	14–17	6–10 (10th)	Joanne Boyle
2014–15	17–14	7–9 (9th)	Joanne Boyle
2015–16	18–16	6–10 (9th)	Joanne Boyle
2016–17	20–13	7–9 (7th)	Joanne Boyle
2017–18	19–14	10–6 (T-6th)	Joanne Boyle
2018–19	12–19	5–11 (12th)	Tina Thompson
2019–20	13–17	8–10 (T-9th)	Tina Thompson
2020–21	0–5	0–2 (N/A)	Tina Thompson
2021–22	5–22	2–16 (T-14th)	Tina Thompson
2022–23	15–15	4–14 (T-13th)	Amaka Agugua-Hamilton
2023–24	16–16	7–11 (T-10th)	Amaka Agugua-Hamilton
2024–25	17–15	8–10 (T-10th)	Amaka Agugua-Hamilton
2025–26	22–12	11–7 (T-8th)	Amaka Agugua-Hamilton

== NCAA tournament results ==
The Cavaliers have appeared the NCAA Division I women's basketball tournament 26 times. They have a record of 37–26.

Year	Seed	Round	Opponent	Result
1984	#5	First Round	#4 NC State	L 73–86
1985	#6	First Round	#3 Tennessee	L 55–65
1986	#1	First Round	#8 James Madison	L 62–71
1987	#3	First Round; Sweet Sixteen	#6 Memphis #2 Tennessee	W 76–75; L 58–77
1988	#2	First Round; Sweet Sixteen; Elite Eight	#7 St. John's #3 Rutgers #1 Tennessee	W 85–64; W 89–75; L 76–84
1989	#4	Second Round; Sweet Sixteen	#12 West Virginia #1 Tennessee	W 81–68; L 47–80
1990	#2	Second Round; Sweet Sixteen; Elite Eight; Final Four	#7 Penn State #3 Providence #1 Tennessee #1 Stanford	W 85–64; W 77–71; W 79–75 (OT); L 66–75
1991	#1	Second Round; Sweet Sixteen; Elite Eight; Final Four; Championship	#8 Stephen F. Austin #5 Oklahoma State #10 Lamar #3 Connecticut; 1 Tennessee	W 74–72; W 76–61; W 85–70; W 61–55; L 67–70 (OT)
1992	#1	Second Round; Sweet Sixteen; Elite Eight; Final Four	#8 George Washington #4 West Virginia #3 Vanderbilt #1 Stanford	W 97–58; W 103–83; W 70–58; L 65–66
1993	#2	Second Round; Sweet Sixteen; Elite Eight	#10 Florida #6 Georgetown #1 Ohio State	W 69–55; W 77–57; L 73–75
1994	#3	First Round; Second Round; Sweet Sixteen	#14 Loyola (MD) #6 SW Missouri State #2 USC	W 72–47; W 67–63; L 66–85
1995	#3	First Round; Second Round; Sweet Sixteen; Elite Eight	#14 Dartmouth #6 Florida #2 Louisiana Tech #1 Connecticut	W 71–68; W 72–67; W 63–62; L 63–67
1996	#3	First Round; Second Round; Sweet Sixteen; Elite Eight	#14 Manhattan #6 George Washington #2 Old Dominion #1 Tennessee	W 100–55; W 62–43; W 72–60; L 46–52
1997	#4	First Round; Second Round; Sweet Sixteen	#13 Troy State #5 Utah #1 Stanford	W 96–74; W 65–46; L 69–91
1998	#6	First Round; Second Round	#11 SMU #3 Arizona	W 77–68; L 77–94
1999	#9	First Round	#8 Penn State	L 69–82
2000	#4	First Round; Second Round; Sweet Sixteen	#13 Pepperdine #5 Boston College #1 Tennessee	W 74–62; W 74–70; L 55–67
2001	#9	First Round	#8 Michigan	L 71–81
2002	#8	First Round	#9 Iowa	L 62–69
2003	#8	First Round; Second Round	#9 Illinois #1 Tennessee	W 72–56; L 51–81
2005	#6	First Round; Second Round	#11 Old Dominion #3 Minnesota	W 79–57; L 58–73
2008	#4	First Round; Second Round	#13 UC Santa Barbara #5 Old Dominion	W 86–52; L 85–88 (OT)
2009	#5	First Round; Second Round	#12 Marquette #4 California	W 68–61; L 73–99
2010	#5	First Round	#12 Green Bay	L 67–69
2018	#10	First Round; Second Round	#7 California #2 South Carolina	W 68–62; L 56–66
2026	#10	First Four; First Round; Second Round; Sweet Sixteen	#10 Arizona State #7 Georgia #2 Iowa #3 TCU	W 57–55; W 82–73 (OT); W 83–75 (2OT); L 69–79

== Players ==
=== Retired numbers ===
The Cavaliers have retired four numbers to date:

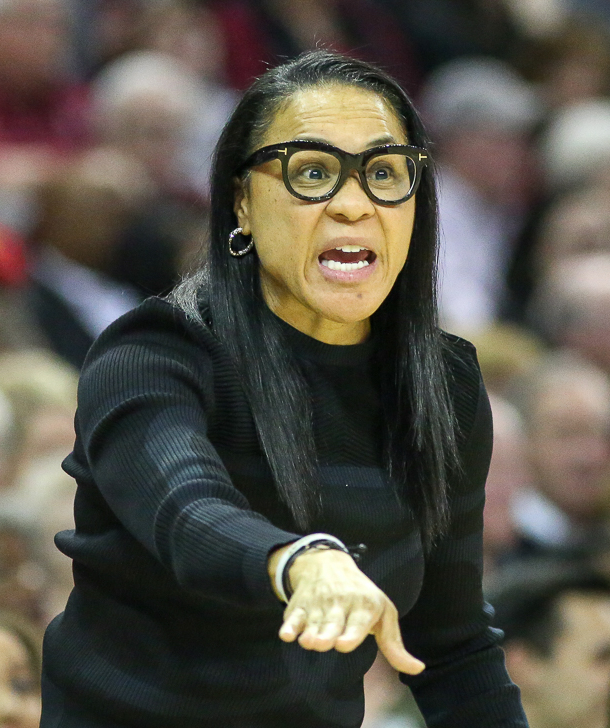
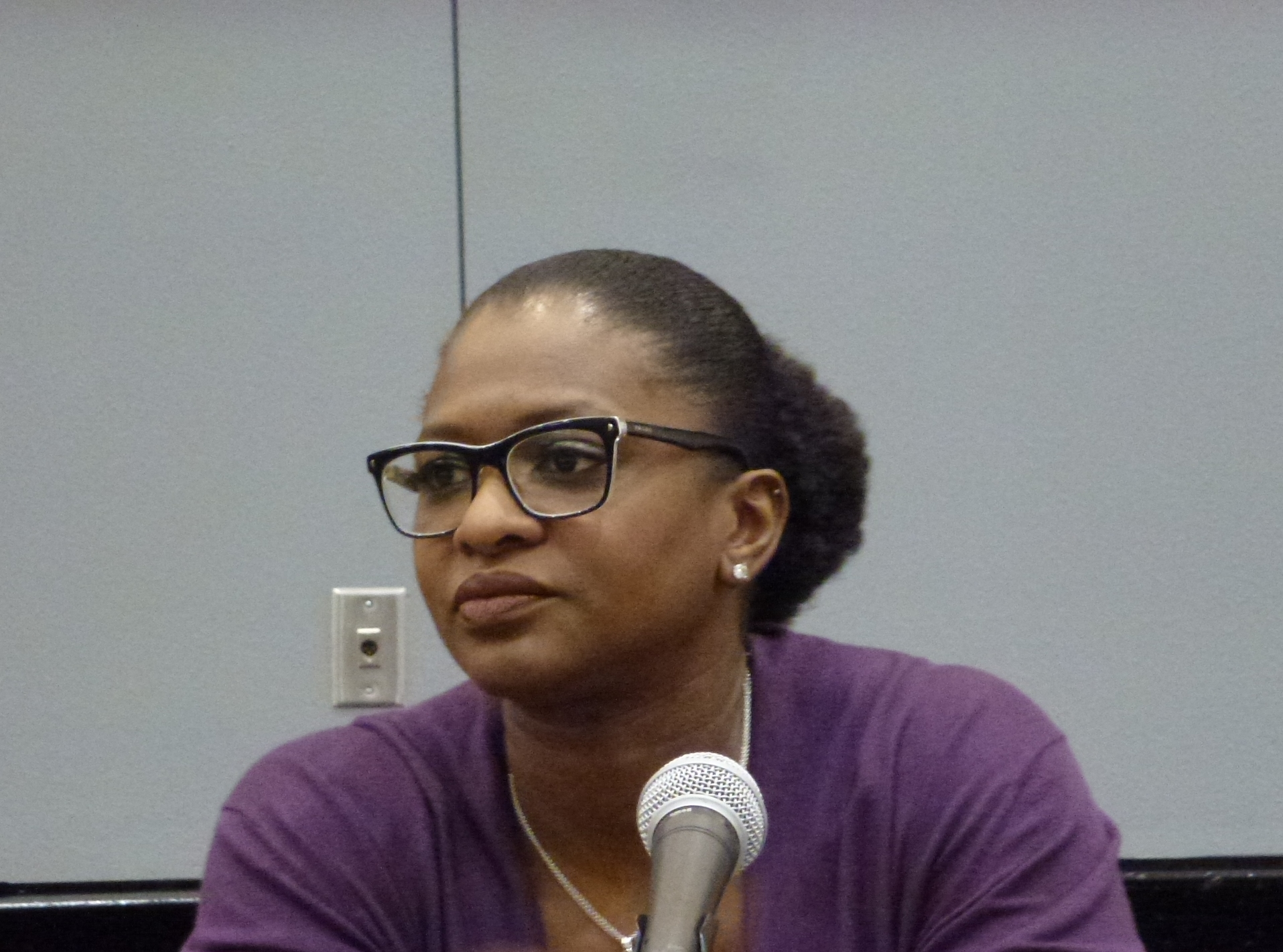
Dawn Staley (left) and Wendy Palmer, some of the players that have their numbers retired

Virginia Cavaliers retired numbers
No.	Player	Pos.	Career
11	Donna Holt	G	1985–88
24	Dawn Staley	PG	1988–1992
25	Cathy Grimes	F	1981–84
31	Wendy Palmer	F	1992–96

== Roster ==
2026–27 Virginia Cavaliers women's basketball team
Players
Coaches

Pos.	#	Name	Height	Year	Previous school	Hometown
G	0	Olivia McGhee	6 ft 2 in (1.88 m)	Sr	IMG Academy	Louisa, VA
G	1	Emilie Brzonova	5 ft 11 in (1.8 m)	Fr	Faenza Basket Project	Czech Republic
F	2	Lyla Coogen	6 ft 3 in (1.91 m)	Fr	The St. James Performance Academy	Arlington, VA
G	3	Erica Gribble	5 ft 11 in (1.8 m)	Fr	Greensburg Central Catholic	Greensburg, PA
G	4	Eris Lester	5 ft 11 in (1.8 m)	Jr	Alabama	Jacksonville, FL
C	7	Tabitha Amanze	6 ft 4 in (1.93 m)	GS	Princeton	Ogun, Nigeria
F	8	Adeang Ring	6 ft 5 in (1.96 m)	Jr	UCF	Sydney, Australia
F	9	Sintija Aukštikalnytė	5 ft 10 in (1.78 m)	Fr		Lithuania
G	10	Mary-Anna Asare	5 ft 8 in (1.73 m)	GS	VCU	Pickering, Ontario
F	12	Caterina Piatti	6 ft 4 in (1.93 m)	So	Florida	Scandiano, Italy
G	21	Kymora Johnson	5 ft 7 in (1.7 m)	Sr	St. Anne's-Belfield	Charlottesville, VA
F	32	Breona Hurd	6 ft 2 in (1.88 m)	Jr	Waynesville	Waynesville, MO
F	44	Janaē Walker	6 ft 3 in (1.91 m)	Sr	Rutgers	Tyrone, GA

Head coach

- Aaron Roussell (Iowa)

Assistant coach(es)

- Kelly Rae Finley (Colorado State)
- Darren Guensch (Radford)
- Ariel Stephenson (Wake Forest)
- Kia Damon-Olson (Fairleigh Dickinson)
- Alex Louin (Villanova)

Legend

- (C) Team captain
- (S) Suspended
- (I) Ineligible
- (W) Walk-on
- Injured
- Current redshirt

Roster
Last update: September 2, 2026
