= 1991 NCAA Division I women's basketball tournament =

American college basketball tournament

- Teams: 48
- Finals site: Lakefront Arena, New Orleans, Louisiana
- Champions: Tennessee Volunteers (3rd title, 4th title game, 7th Final Four)
- Runner-up: Virginia Cavaliers (1st title game, 2nd Final Four)
- Semifinalists: Stanford Cardinal (2nd Final Four); Connecticut Huskies (1st Final Four)
- Winning coach: Pat Summitt (3rd title)
- MOP: Dawn Staley (Virginia)

The 1991 NCAA Division I women's basketball tournament began on March 13 and ended on March 31. The tournament featured 48 teams. The Final Four event was hosted by the University of New Orleans, and held at the Lakefront Arena in New Orleans. The Final Four teams consisted of Tennessee, Stanford, Connecticut, and Virginia, with Tennessee defeating Virginia 70–67 (OT) to win its third NCAA title. Virginia's Dawn Staley was named the Most Outstanding Player of the tournament.

This tournament was the first to adopt the FIBA's 10ths-second clock during the final minute of each period, unlike whole seconds as in past seasons.

== Notable events ==
James Madison earned an 8 seed and beat the 9 seed, Kentucky in a first round match-up. This set up a game between the Dukes, and the number 1 seed in the East Regional Penn State, with the game played on the Penn State home court. The game started out in favor of the home team, as they scored the first eleven points of the game, forcing JMU coach Sheila Moorman to call a timeout. The lead extended, with the Nittany Lions pulling out to a 24–9. The coach decided to stress defense and it helped, but Penn State held a 41–29 lead at halftime. The team continued to stress defense in the second half, and the Dukes held Penn State to six points in the first eight minutes of the second half. The Dukes took a lead, and were up by four points with under twelve minutes to go. Penn State cut the lead to two points, and with 19 seconds to go attempted a three-point shot for the win, but the shot was blocked, and JMU would upset the top seed. It was only the second time in the ten-year history of the NCAA tournament that a number 1 seed had failed to advance to the regional. Coincidentally, first time was in 1986 when number 1 seeded Virginia failed to reach the regional when they were defeated by James Madison.

10th seeded Vanderbilt upset 7th seeded South Carolina, then went on to defeat the second seeded Purdue 69–63, to advance to the regional, where they would lose to Auburn. 10th seeded Lamar upset 7th seeded Texas, then went on to a 20-point victory over second seeded LSU. Oklahoma State faced Michigan State in a game that would go to three overtimes. Oklahoma State won 96–94.

Connecticut defeated Clemson in the Regional final to earn their first trip to a Final Four. There they would take on one seeded Virginia. Connecticut's coach, Geno Auriemma started his women's basketball college coaching career as an assistant coach under Debbie Ryan at Virginia. In a game identified in 2009 as one of the top ten games in UConn history, Tonya Cardoza scored 16 points for the Cavaliers, including four three throws in the final second to help Virginia defeat Connecticut 61–55. Tonya Cardoza would go on to become an assistant coach at Connecticut for many years.

In the other semifinal game, Tennessee defeated Stanford 68–60 to advance to the championship game against Virginia. The Cavaliers would lead by five points with under two minutes to go, but Tennessee's Dena Head scored, was fouled, and converted the free throw to cut the margin to two points. Virginia failed to score, then fouled Head with seconds to go, who sank the free throws to send the game to overtime. Head continued to hit free throws in overtime, and the Volunteers went on to win the game and the national championship 70–67.

== Qualifying teams – automatic ==
Forty-eight teams were selected to participate in the 1991 NCAA Tournament. Twenty-one conferences were eligible for an automatic bid to the 1991 NCAA tournament.

Automatic bids
		Record		
Qualifying school	Conference	Regular Season	Conference	Seed
Appalachian State University	Southern Conference	19–13	5–5	12
University of Arkansas at Little Rock	Southwest	27–3	15–1	3
University of Connecticut	Big East	26–4	14–2	3
DePaul University	North Star Conference	19–11	11–3	12
Florida State University	Metro	24–6	12–2	5
California State University, Long Beach	Big West Conference	23–7	15–3	4
Louisiana Tech University	American South	18–11	9–3	10
Louisiana State University	SEC	24–6	5–4	2
Southwest Missouri State University	Gateway	25–4	16–2	8
University of Montana	Big Sky Conference	26–3	16–0	11
North Carolina State University	ACC	26–5	9–5	2
Oklahoma State University–Stillwater	Big Eight	25–5	11–3	5
Pennsylvania State University	Atlantic 10	29–1	17–1	1
Purdue University	Big Ten	26–2	17–1	2
University of Richmond	Colonial	26–4	11–1	7
Stanford University	Pac-10	23–5	16–2	2
Stephen F. Austin State University	Southland	25–4	14–0	8
Tennessee Technological University	Ohio Valley Conference	22–7	11–1	9
University of Toledo	MAC	23–6	13–3	11
University of Utah	WAC	20–9	9–3	12
Western Kentucky University	Sun Belt Conference	28–2	6–0	4

== Qualifying teams – at-large ==
Twenty-seven additional teams were selected to complete the forty-eight invitations.

At-large bids
		Record		
Qualifying school	Conference	Regular Season	Conference	Seed
Auburn University	Southeastern	24–5	7–2	3
California State University, Fullerton	Big West	24–7	14–4	7
Clemson University	Atlantic Coast	20–10	8–6	4
Fairfield University	Metro Atlantic	25–5	15–1	12
The George Washington University	Atlantic 10	22–6	15–3	10
University of Georgia	Southeastern	26–3	9–0	1
College of the Holy Cross	Patriot	24–5	12–0	11
University of Iowa	Big Ten	20–8	13–5	6
James Madison University	Colonial	24–4	11–1	8
University of Kentucky	Southeastern	20–8	4–5	9
Lamar University	American South	26–3	12–0	10
University of Maryland, College Park	Atlantic Coast	17–12	9–5	6
Michigan State University	Big Ten	21–7	13–5	4
University of Mississippi (Ole Miss)	Southeastern	20–8	4–5	9
Northwestern University	Big Ten	20–8	12–6	6
Providence College	Big East	25–5	13–3	5
Rutgers University	Atlantic 10	23–6	15–3	6
University of South Carolina	Metro	22–8	12–2	7
University of Southern California	Pacific-10	17–11	11–7	5
University of Tennessee	Southeastern	25–5	6–3	1
University of Texas at Austin	Southwest	21–8	14–2	7
Texas Tech University	Southwest	23–7	12–4	9
University of Nevada, Las Vegas	Big West	24–6	15–3	8
Vanderbilt University	Southeastern	17–11	4–5	10
University of Virginia	Atlantic Coast	27–2	14–0	1
University of Washington	Pacific-10	23–4	15–3	3
Washington State University	Pacific-10	18–10	10–8	11

== Bids by conference ==
Twenty-one conferences earned an automatic bid. In ten cases, the automatic bid was the only representative from the conference. Two conferences, Metro Atlantic and Patriot sent a single representative as an at-large team. Twenty-five additional at-large teams were selected from ten of the conferences.

Bids	Conference	Teams
7	Southeastern	LSU, Auburn, Georgia, Kentucky, Ole Miss, Tennessee, Vanderbilt
4	Atlantic Coast	North Carolina St., Clemson, Maryland, Virginia
4	Big Ten	Purdue, Iowa, Michigan St., Northwestern
4	Pacific-10	Stanford, Southern California, Washington, Washington St.
3	Atlantic 10	Penn St., George Washington, Rutgers
3	Big West	Long Beach St., Cal St. Fullerton, UNLV
3	Southwest	Arkansas, Texas, Texas Tech
2	American South	Louisiana Tech, Lamar
2	Big East	Connecticut, Providence
2	Colonial	Richmond, James Madison
2	Metro	Florida St., South Carolina
1	Big Eight	Oklahoma St.
1	Big Sky	Montana
1	Metro Atlantic	Fairfield
1	Mid-American	Toledo
1	Missouri Valley	Missouri St.
1	North Star	DePaul
1	Ohio Valley	Tennessee Tech
1	Patriot	Holy Cross
1	Southern	Appalachian St.
1	Southland	Stephen F. Austin
1	Sun Belt	Western Ky.
1	Western Athletic	Utah

== First and second rounds ==
1991 NCAA first round
1991 NCAA second round

In 1991, the field remained at 48 teams. The teams were seeded, and assigned to four geographic regions, with seeds 1-12 in each region. In Round 1, seeds 8 and 9 faced each other for the opportunity to face the 1 seed in the second round, seeds 7 and 10 played for the opportunity to face the 2 seed, seeds 5 and 12 played for the opportunity to face the 4 seed, and seeds 6 and 11 played for the opportunity to face the 3 seed. In the first two rounds, the higher seed was given the opportunity to host the first-round game. In most cases, the higher seed accepted the opportunity. The exceptions:

- Seventh seeded South Carolina played tenth seeded Vanderbilt at Vanderbilt
- Sixth seeded Maryland played eleventh seeded Holy Cross at Holy Cross
- Sixth seeded Iowa played eleventh seeded Montana at Montana
- Fourth seeded Michigan State played fifth seeded Oklahoma State at Oklahoma State
- Second seeded LSU played tenth seeded Lamar at Lamar

The following table lists the region, host school, venue and the thirty-two first and second round locations:

Region	Rnd	Host	Venue	City	State
East	1	Providence College	Alumni Hall (Providence)	Providence	Rhode Island
East	1	Rutgers University	Louis Brown Athletic Center	Piscataway	New Jersey
East	1	James Madison University	James Madison University Convocation Center	Harrisonburg	Virginia
East	1	University of Richmond	Robins Center	Richmond	Virginia
East	2	Clemson University	Littlejohn Coliseum	Clemson	South Carolina
East	2	University of Connecticut	Harry A. Gampel Pavilion	Storrs	Connecticut
East	2	Pennsylvania State University	Recreation Building (Rec Hall)	University Park	Pennsylvania
East	2	North Carolina State University	Reynolds Coliseum	Raleigh	North Carolina
Mideast	1	Florida State University	Tully Gymnasium	Tallahassee	Florida
Mideast	1	Vanderbilt University	Memorial Gymnasium (Vanderbilt University)	Nashville	Tennessee
Mideast	1	Southwest Missouri State University	Hammons Student Center	Springfield	Missouri
Mideast	1	Holy Cross	Hart Center	Worcester	Massachusetts
Mideast	2	Purdue University	Mackey Arena	West Lafayette	Indiana
Mideast	2	Western Kentucky University	E.A. Diddle Arena	Bowling Green	Kentucky
Mideast	2	University of Tennessee	Thompson-Boling Arena	Knoxville	Tennessee
Mideast	2	Auburn University	Memorial Coliseum (Beard–Eaves–Memorial Coliseum)	Auburn	Alabama
Midwest	1	Northwestern University	Welsh-Ryan Arena	Evanston	Illinois
Midwest	1	Oklahoma State University	Gallagher-Iba Arena	Stillwater	Oklahoma
Midwest	1	Stephen F. Austin University	William R. Johnson Coliseum	Nacogdoches	Texas
Midwest	1	University of Texas	Frank Erwin Center	Austin	Texas
Midwest	2	Oklahoma State University	Gallagher-Iba Arena	Stillwater	Oklahoma
Midwest	2	University of Virginia	University Hall (University of Virginia)	Charlottesville	Virginia
Midwest	2	Lamar University	Montagne Center	Beaumont	Texas
Midwest	2	University of Arkansas	Barnhill Arena	Fayetteville	Arkansas
West	1	University of Montana	Dahlberg Arena	Missoula	Montana
West	1	University of Nevada, Las Vegas	Thomas and Mack Center	Paradise	Nevada
West	1	University of Southern California	Lyon Center	Los Angeles	California
West	1	California State University, Fullerton	Titan Gym	Fullerton	California
West	2	Stanford University	Maples Pavilion	Stanford	California
West	2	University of Georgia	Georgia Coliseum (Stegeman Coliseum)	Athens	Georgia
West	2	University of Washington	Hec Edmundson Pavilion	Seattle	Washington
West	2	Long Beach State	University Gym (Gold Mine)	Long Beach	California

== Regionals and Final Four ==
1991 NCAA regionals and Final Four

The Regionals, named for the general location, were held from March 22 to March 24 at these sites:

- East Regional Palestra, Philadelphia, Pennsylvania (Host: Villanova University)
- Mideast Regional Thompson–Boling Arena, Knoxville, Tennessee (Host: University of Tennessee)
- Midwest Regional Frank Erwin Center, Austin, Texas (Host: University of Texas)
- West Regional Thomas and Mack Center, Las Vegas, Nevada (Host: University of Nevada at Las Vegas)

Each regional winner advanced to the Final Four, held March 30 and March 31 in New Orleans, Louisiana at the Lakefront Arena, co-hosted by University of New Orleans & Tulane University.

== Bids by state ==
The forty-eight teams came from thirty states, plus Washington, D.C. California and Texas had the most teams with four each. Twenty states did not have any teams receiving bids.

NCAA Women's basketball Tournament invitations by state 1991

Bids	State	Teams
4	California	Long Beach St., Stanford, Cal St. Fullerton, Southern California
4	Texas	Stephen F. Austin, Lamar, Texas, Texas Tech
3	Tennessee	Tennessee Tech, Tennessee, Vanderbilt
3	Virginia	Richmond, James Madison, Virginia
2	Connecticut	Connecticut, Fairfield
2	Illinois	DePaul, Northwestern
2	Kentucky	Western Ky., Kentucky
2	Louisiana	Louisiana Tech, LSU
2	North Carolina	Appalachian St., North Carolina St.
2	South Carolina	Clemson, South Carolina
2	Washington	Washington, Washington St.
1	Alabama	Auburn
1	Arkansas	Arkansas
1	District of Columbia	George Washington
1	Florida	Florida St.
1	Georgia	Georgia
1	Indiana	Purdue
1	Iowa	Iowa
1	Maryland	Maryland
1	Massachusetts	Holy Cross
1	Michigan	Michigan St.
1	Mississippi	Ole Miss
1	Missouri	Missouri St.
1	Montana	Montana
1	Nevada	UNLV
1	New Jersey	Rutgers
1	Ohio	Toledo
1	Oklahoma	Oklahoma St.
1	Pennsylvania	Penn St.
1	Rhode Island	Providence
1	Utah	Utah

== Brackets ==
First and second-round games played at higher seed except where noted.

=== Mideast regional – Knoxville, TN ===
First round March 13
8	Missouri St.	94
9	Tennessee Tech	64
5	Florida St.	96
12	Appalachian St.	57
7	South Carolina	64
10	at Vanderbilt	73
6	Maryland	74
11	at Holy Cross	81

Second round March 16–17
1	Tennessee	55
8	Missouri St.	47
4	Western Kentucky	72
5	Florida St.	69
2	Purdue	63
10	Vanderbilt	69
3	Auburn	84
11	Holy Cross	58

Regional semifinals March 21
1	Tennessee	68
4	Western Kentucky	61
10	Vanderbilt	45
3	Auburn	58

Regional finals March 23
1	Tennessee	69
3	Auburn	65

=== West regional – Las Vegas, NV ===
First round March 13
8	UNLV	70
9	Texas Tech	65
5	Southern California	63
12	Utah	52
7	Cal St. Fullerton	84
10	Louisiana Tech	80
6	Iowa	64
11	at Montana	53

Second round March 16–17
1	Georgia	86
8	UNLV	62
4	Long Beach St.	83
5	Southern California	58
2	Stanford	91
7	Cal St. Fullerton	67
3	Washington	70
6	Iowa	53

Regional semifinals March 21
1	Georgia	87
4	Long Beach St.	77
2	Stanford	73
3	Washington	47

Regional finals March 23
1	Georgia	67
2	Stanford	75

=== East regional – Philadelphia, PA ===
First round March 13
8	James Madison	70
9	Kentucky	62
5	Providence	88
12	Fairfield	87
7	Richmond	62
10	George Washington	73
6	Rutgers	65
11	Toledo	83

Second round March 16–17
1	Penn State	71
8	James Madison	73
4	Clemson	103
5	Providence	91
2	North Carolina St.	94
10	George Washington	83
3	Connecticut	81
11	Toledo	80

Regional semifinals March 21
8	James Madison	55
4	Clemson	57
2	North Carolina St.	71
3	Connecticut	82

Regional finals March 23
4	Clemson	57
3	Connecticut	60

=== Midwest regional – Austin, Texas ===
First round March 13
8	Stephen F. Austin	73
9	Ole Miss	62
5	Oklahoma St.	81
12	DePaul	80
7	Texas	63
10	Lamar	77
6	Northwestern	82
11	Washington St.	62

Second round March 16–17
1	Virginia	74
8	Stephen F. Austin	72
4	Michigan St.	94
5	at Oklahoma St.	96 (3OT)
2	LSU	73
10	at Lamar	93
3	Arkansas	105
6	Northwestern	68

Regional semifinals March 21
1	Virginia	76
5	Oklahoma St.	61
10	Lamar	91
3	Arkansas	75

Regional finals March 23
1	Virginia	85
10	Lamar	70

=== Final Four – New Orleans, LA ===
National semifinals March 30
1ME	Tennessee	68
2W	Stanford	60
3E	Connecticut	55
1MW	Virginia	61

National championship March 31
1ME	Tennessee	70
1MW	Virginia	67 (OT)

== Record by conference ==
Seventeen conferences had more than one bid, or at least one win in NCAA Tournament play:

Conference	# of Bids	Record	Win %	Round of 32	Sweet Sixteen	Elite Eight	Final Four	Championship Game
Southeastern	7	11–6	.647	5	4	3	1	1
Atlantic Coast	4	7–4	.636	3	3	2	1	1
Pacific-10	4	5–4	.556	3	2	1	1	–
Big Ten	4	2–4	.333	4	–	–	–	–
Big West	3	3–3	.500	3	1	–	–	–
Atlantic 10	3	1–3	.250	2	–	–	–	–
Southwest	3	1–3	.250	1	1	–	–	–
Big East	2	4–2	.667	2	1	1	1	–
American South	2	3–2	.600	1	1	1	–	–
Colonial	2	2–2	.500	1	1	–	–	–
Metro	2	1–2	.333	1	–	–	–	–
Big Eight	1	2–1	.667	1	1	–	–	–
Gateway	1	1–1	.500	1	–	–	–	–
Mid-American	1	1–1	.500	1	–	–	–	–
Patriot	1	1–1	.500	1	–	–	–	–
Southland	1	1–1	.500	1	–	–	–	–
Sun Belt	1	1–1	.500	1	1	–	–	–

Seven conferences went 0-1: Big Sky Conference, MAAC, North Star Conference, Ohio Valley Conference, Southern Conference, and WAC

== All-Tournament team ==
- Dawn Staley, Virginia
- Tonya Cardoza, Virginia
- Daedra Charles, Tennessee
- Dena Head, Tennessee
- Sonja Henning, Stanford

== Game officials ==
- Mike Brooks (semifinal)
- June Courteau (semifinal)
- Art Bomengen (semifinal)
- John Morningstar (semifinal)
- Patty Broderick (final)
- Lou Pitt (final)

== See also ==
- 1991 NCAA Division I men's basketball tournament
