= SEC women's basketball tournament =

Annual college basketball tournament

- Conference basketball championship
- SEC Logo
- Sport: Basketball
- Conference: Southeastern Conference
- Number of teams: 16
- Format: Single-elimination tournament
- Current stadium: Bon Secours Wellness Arena
- Current location: Greenville, SC
- Played: 1980–present
- Last contest: 2026
- Current champion: Texas
- Most championships: Tennessee (17)
- Official website: SECSports.com Women's Basketball

The SEC women's basketball tournament (sometimes known simply as the SEC Tournament) is the conference tournament in women's basketball for the Southeastern Conference (SEC). It is a single-elimination tournament that involves all league schools (currently 16 after the addition of two schools in 2024), and seeded based on regular season records.

The tournament was first held in 1980, and originally determined the conference champion. Even after the SEC began a uniform conference schedule in the 1982–83 season, the tournament continued to determine the official conference champion through the 1985 edition. Starting in the 1985–86 season, the SEC began awarding its official conference championship solely to the team(s) with the best regular-season record. This change brought SEC women's basketball in line with men's basketball, in which the SEC has awarded its official conference title based on regular-season record since the 1950–51 season.

Under the current format, the bottom four teams in the conference play first-round games, while the top four teams receive a "double-bye" and do not play until the quarterfinals.

== History ==
=== Tournaments ===
Year	Champion	Score	Runner-up	Tournament MVP	Location
1980	Tennessee	85–71	Ole Miss	Jill Rankin, TN	Stokely Athletic Center, Knoxville, Tennessee
1981	Auburn	61–50	Alabama	Becky Jackson, AUB	LSU Assembly Center, Baton Rouge, Louisiana
1982	Kentucky	80–74	Tennessee	Valerie Still, KY	Memorial Coliseum, Lexington, Kentucky
1983	Georgia	72–69	Ole Miss	Teresa Edwards, GA	Stokely Athletic Center, Knoxville, Tennessee
1984	Georgia	74–65	Alabama	Cassandra Crumpton, GA	Georgia Coliseum, Athens, Georgia
1985	Tennessee	63–60	Auburn	Sheila Collins, TN	Various Campus Sites
1986	Georgia	94–72	LSU	Katrina McClain, GA	Georgia Coliseum, Athens, Georgia
1987	Auburn	83–57	Georgia	Vickie Orr, AUB	Albany Civic Center, Albany, Georgia
1988	Tennessee	73–70	Auburn	Bridgette Gordon, TN	Albany Civic Center, Albany, Georgia
1989	Tennessee	66–51	Auburn	Bridgette Gordon, TN (2)	Albany Civic Center, Albany, Georgia
1990	Auburn	78–77	Tennessee	Carolyn Jones, AUB	Albany Civic Center, Albany, Georgia
1991	LSU	80–75	Tennessee	Pokey Chatman, LSU	Albany Civic Center, Albany, Georgia
1992	Tennessee	73–66	Georgia	Dena Head, TN	Albany Civic Center, Albany, Georgia
1993	Vanderbilt	76–64	Georgia	Maura Cunningham, VAN	McKenzie Arena, Chattanooga, Tennessee
1994	Tennessee	82–57	Vanderbilt	Tiffany Woosley, TN	McKenzie Arena, Chattanooga, Tennessee
1995	Vanderbilt	67–61	Tennessee	Sheri Sam, VAN	McKenzie Arena, Chattanooga, Tennessee
1996	Tennessee	64–60	Alabama	Dominique Canty, ALA	McKenzie Arena, Chattanooga, Tennessee
1997	Auburn	52–47	Florida	Laticia Morris, AUB	McKenzie Arena, Chattanooga, Tennessee
1998	Tennessee	67–63	Alabama	Chamique Holdsclaw, TN	Columbus Civic Center, Columbus, Georgia
1999	Tennessee	85–69	Georgia	Chamique Holdsclaw, TN (2)	McKenzie Arena, Chattanooga, Tennessee
2000	Tennessee	70–67	Mississippi State	LaToya Thomas, MSST	McKenzie Arena, Chattanooga, Tennessee
2001	Georgia	62–60	Vanderbilt	Chantelle Anderson, VAN	The Pyramid, Memphis, Tennessee
2002	Vanderbilt	63–48	LSU	Zuzana Klimešová, VAN	Gaylord Entertainment Center, Nashville, Tennessee
2003	LSU	78–62	Tennessee	Temeka Johnson, LSU	Alltel Arena, North Little Rock, Arkansas
2004	Vanderbilt	62–56	Georgia	Carla Thomas, VAN	Gaylord Entertainment Center, Nashville, Tennessee
2005	Tennessee	67–65	LSU	Shyra Ely, TN	Bi-Lo Center, Greenville, South Carolina
2006	Tennessee	63–62	LSU	Candace Parker, TN	Alltel Arena, North Little Rock, Arkansas
2007	Vanderbilt	51–45	LSU	Carla Thomas, VAN (2)	Arena at Gwinnett Center, Duluth, Georgia
2008	Tennessee	61–55	LSU	Candace Parker, TN (2)	Sommet Center, Nashville, Tennessee
2009	Vanderbilt	61–54	Auburn	Christina Wirth, VAN	Alltel Arena, North Little Rock, Arkansas
2010	Tennessee	70–62	Kentucky	Alyssia Brewer, TN	Arena at Gwinnett Center, Duluth, Georgia
2011	Tennessee	90–65	Kentucky	Shekinna Stricklen, TN	Bridgestone Arena, Nashville, Tennessee
2012	Tennessee	70–58	LSU	Glory Johnson, TN	Bridgestone Arena, Nashville, Tennessee
2013	Texas A&M	75–67	Kentucky	Kelsey Bone, TXA&M	Arena at Gwinnett Center, Duluth, Georgia
2014	Tennessee	71–70	Kentucky	Isabelle Harrison, TN	Arena at Gwinnett Center, Duluth, Georgia
2015	South Carolina	62–46	Tennessee	Aleighsa Welch, SC	Verizon Arena, North Little Rock, Arkansas
2016	South Carolina	66–52	Mississippi State	Tiffany Mitchell, SC	Jacksonville Veterans Memorial Arena, Jacksonville, Florida
2017	South Carolina	59–49	Mississippi State	A'ja Wilson, SC	Bon Secours Wellness Arena, Greenville, South Carolina
2018	South Carolina	62–51	Mississippi State	A'ja Wilson, SC (2)	Bridgestone Arena, Nashville, Tennessee
2019	Mississippi State	101–70	Arkansas	Teaira McCowan, MSST	Bon Secours Wellness Arena, Greenville, South Carolina
2020	South Carolina	76–62	Mississippi State	Mikiah Herbert Harrigan, SC	Bon Secours Wellness Arena, Greenville, South Carolina
2021	South Carolina	67–62	Georgia	Aliyah Boston, SC	Bon Secours Wellness Arena, Greenville, South Carolina
2022	Kentucky	64–62	South Carolina	Rhyne Howard, KY	Bridgestone Arena, Nashville, Tennessee
2023	South Carolina	74–58	Tennessee	Aliyah Boston, SC (2)	Bon Secours Wellness Arena, Greenville, South Carolina
2024	South Carolina	79–72	LSU	MiLaysia Fulwiley, SC	Bon Secours Wellness Arena, Greenville, South Carolina
2025	South Carolina	64–45	Texas	Chloe Kitts, SC	Bon Secours Wellness Arena, Greenville, South Carolina
2026	Texas	78–61	South Carolina	Madison Booker, TX	Bon Secours Wellness Arena, Greenville, South Carolina
2027					Bon Secours Wellness Arena, Greenville, South Carolina
2028					Bon Secours Wellness Arena, Greenville, South Carolina

== Tournament championships by school ==
School	Championships	Championship Years
Tennessee	17	1980, 1985, 1988, 1989, 1992, 1994, 1996, 1998, 1999, 2000, 2005, 2006, 2008, 2010, 2011, 2012, 2014
South Carolina	9	2015, 2016, 2017, 2018, 2020, 2021, 2023, 2024, 2025
Vanderbilt	6	1993, 1995, 2002, 2004, 2007, 2009
Auburn	4	1981, 1987, 1990, 1997
Georgia	4	1983, 1984, 1986, 2001
LSU	2	1991, 2003
Kentucky	2	1982, 2022
Mississippi State	1	2019
Texas A&M	1	2013
Texas	1	2026
Alabama	0	
Arkansas	0	
Florida	0	
Ole Miss	0	
Missouri	0	
Oklahoma	0	
