= Tennessee–Vanderbilt rivalry =

College sports rivalry

- Tennessee Volunteers Vanderbilt Commodores
- Sport: Football, basketball, baseball, others

The Tennessee–Vanderbilt rivalry is a college sports rivalry between University of Tennessee Volunteers and Vanderbilt University Commodores. As the SEC's two schools located in the state of Tennessee, and separated by just under 180 miles, the two schools are rivals in all sports, with the football, basketball, and baseball series being especially hotly contested.

== Men's basketball ==
Tennessee–Vanderbilt men's basketball rivalry
- Tennessee Volunteers Vanderbilt Commodores
- Sport: Basketball
- First meeting: 1910; Tennessee 20, Vanderbilt 5
- Latest meeting: March 13, 2026; Vanderbilt 75, Tennessee 68

Statistics
- Total meetings: 212
- All-time series: Tennessee leads, 133–79
- Largest victory: Vanderbilt, 108–68 (1993)
- Longest win streak: Tennessee, 11 (1943–1949, 2018–2023)
- Current win streak: Vanderbilt, 2 (2026–present)

Tennessee victories	Vanderbilt victories	Tie games

No.	Date	Location	Winning team		Losing team	
1	February 11, 1922	Knoxville, TN	Tennessee	20	Vanderbilt	5
2	February 22, 1922	Nashville, TN	Tennessee	16	Vanderbilt	15
3	February 22, 1923	Nashville, TN	Vanderbilt	28	Tennessee	25
4	February 9, 1924	Knoxville, TN	Tennessee	36	Vanderbilt	23
5	February 2, 1925	Nashville, TN	Vanderbilt	27	Tennessee	18
6	February 6, 1926	Knoxville, TN	Tennessee	38	Vanderbilt	32
7	February 21, 1927	Nashville, TN	Vanderbilt	35	Tennessee	25
8	February 18, 1928	Nashville, TN	Vanderbilt	28	Tennessee	26
9	February 23, 1929	Nashville, TN	Tennessee	26	Vanderbilt	22
10	February 8, 1930	Nashville, TN	Tennessee	23	Vanderbilt	21
11	February 22, 1930	Knoxville, TN	Tennessee	38	Vanderbilt	33
12	January 27, 1931	Nashville, TN	Vanderbilt	41	Tennessee	40
13	February 21, 1931	Knoxville, TN	Tennessee	37	Vanderbilt	34
14	January 26, 1932	Nashville, TN	Tennessee	27	Vanderbilt	25
15	February 19, 1932	Knoxville, TN	Tennessee	27	Vanderbilt	22
16	January 10, 1933	Nashville, TN	Vanderbilt	37	Tennessee	32
17	February 17, 1933	Knoxville, TN	Tennessee	35	Vanderbilt	27
18	January 24, 1934	Nashville, TN	Vanderbilt	31	Tennessee	26
19	February 16, 1934	Knoxville, TN	Tennessee	45	Vanderbilt	34
20	February 12, 1935	Nashville, TN	Tennessee	39	Vanderbilt	29
21	February 23, 1935	Knoxville, TN	Tennessee	39	Vanderbilt	37
22	February 18, 1936	Nashville, TN	Vanderbilt	33	Tennessee	30
23	February 22, 1936	Knoxville, TN	Tennessee	34	Vanderbilt	33
24	February 4, 1937	Nashville, TN	Tennessee	50	Vanderbilt	30
25	February 17, 1937	Knoxville, TN	Tennessee	34	Vanderbilt	28
26	January 28, 1938	Nashville, TN	Tennessee	37	Vanderbilt	30
27	February 19, 1938	Knoxville, TN	Tennessee	38	Vanderbilt	26
28	January 28, 1939	Knoxville, TN	Tennessee	33	Vanderbilt	31
29	February 21, 1939	Nashville, TN	Vanderbilt	46	Tennessee	38
30	March 3, 1939	Knoxville, TN	Tennessee	39	Vanderbilt	36
31	January 15, 1940	Knoxville, TN	Tennessee	29	Vanderbilt	23
32	January 27, 1940	Nashville, TN	Tennessee	34	Vanderbilt	31
33	February 17, 1941	Nashville, TN	Tennessee	37	Vanderbilt	36
34	February 22, 1941	Knoxville, TN	Tennessee	46	Vanderbilt	25
35	February 16, 1942	Nashville, TN	Tennessee	34	Vanderbilt	33
36	February 21, 1942	Knoxville, TN	Tennessee	39	Vanderbilt	26
37	February 15, 1943	Nashville, TN	Vanderbilt	30	Tennessee	27
38	February 20, 1943	Knoxville, TN	Tennessee	44	Vanderbilt	22
39	February 26, 1943	Louisville, KY	Tennessee	41	Vanderbilt	31
40	February 18, 1946	Nashville, TN	Tennessee	55	Vanderbilt	33
41	February 25, 1946	Knoxville, TN	Tennessee	42	Vanderbilt	32
42	February 28, 1946	Louisville, KY	Tennessee	46	Vanderbilt	32
43	February 17, 1947	Nashville, TN	Tennessee	54	Vanderbilt	47
44	February 22, 1947	Knoxville, TN	Tennessee	56	Vanderbilt	21
45	February 16, 1948	Nashville, TN	Tennessee	63	Vanderbilt	48
46	February 21, 1948	Knoxville, TN	Tennessee	72	Vanderbilt	53
47	January 10, 1949	Nashville, TN	Tennessee	53	Vanderbilt	51
48	January 29, 1949	Knoxville, TN	Tennessee	67	Vanderbilt	64
49	January 7, 1950	Knoxville, TN	Vanderbilt	67	Tennessee	52
50	January 28, 1950	Nashville, TN	Vanderbilt	50	Tennessee	44
51	March 3, 1950	Louisville, KY	Tennessee	50	Vanderbilt	44
52	January 23, 1951	Nashville, TN	Vanderbilt	58	Tennessee	57
53	February 5, 1951	Knoxville, TN	Tennessee	61	Vanderbilt	59
54	March 1, 1951	Louisville, KY	Vanderbilt	88	Tennessee	52
55	January 5, 1952	Nashville, TN	Vanderbilt	80	Tennessee	60
56	January 22, 1952	Knoxville, TN	Tennessee	68	Vanderbilt	50
57	December 30, 1952	Nashville, TN	Vanderbilt	77	Tennessee	69
58	January 24, 1953	Knoxville, TN	Tennessee	83	Vanderbilt	79
59	February 28, 1953	Nashville, TN	Vanderbilt	85	Tennessee	64
60	January 9, 1954	Knoxville, TN	Tennessee	62	#19 Vanderbilt	43
61	March 6, 1954	Nashville, TN	Tennessee	80	Vanderbilt	76
62	January 8, 1955	Knoxville, TN	Vanderbilt	73	Tennessee	69
63	February 19, 1955	Nashville, TN	#20 Vanderbilt	76	#18 Tennessee	71
64	January 7, 1956	Knoxville, TN	#4 Vanderbilt	84	Tennessee	57
65	February 18, 1956	Nashville, TN	#6 Vanderbilt	96	Tennessee	68
66	January 5, 1957	Knoxville, TN	#9 Vanderbilt	71	#12 Tennessee	68
67	February 16, 1957	Nashville, TN	#18 Vanderbilt	69	Tennessee	62
68	January 4, 1958	Knoxville, TN	Tennessee	67	Vanderbilt	55
69	February 15, 1958	Nashville, TN	Vanderbilt	83	#15 Tennessee	70
70	January 3, 1959	Knoxville, TN	#14 Tennessee	65	Vanderbilt	60
71	February 14, 1959	Nashville, TN	Vanderbilt	76	Tennessee	60
72	January 2, 1960	Knoxville, TN	Tennessee	72	Vanderbilt	60
73	February 13, 1960	Nashville, TN	Vanderbilt	63	Tennessee	53
74	January 7, 1961	Knoxville, TN	Vanderbilt	68	Tennessee	66
75	February 18, 1961	Nashville, TN	Vanderbilt	76	Tennessee	60
76	January 6, 1962	Knoxville, TN	Tennessee	85	Vanderbilt	83
77	February 17, 1962	Nashville, TN	Vanderbilt	97	Tennessee	76
78	January 5, 1963	Knoxville, TN	Vanderbilt	68	Tennessee	50
79	February 16, 1963	Nashville, TN	Vanderbilt	74	Tennessee	72
80	January 4, 1964	Knoxville, TN	Tennessee	57	#6 Vanderbilt	55
81	February 15, 1964	Nashville, TN	Tennessee	65	#7 Vanderbilt	62
82	January 2, 1965	Nashville, TN	Vanderbilt	77	Tennessee	72
83	February 13, 1965	Knoxville, TN	Tennessee	79	#7 Vanderbilt	66
84	December 7, 1965	Knoxville, TN	#4 Vanderbilt	53	Tennessee	50
85	January 12, 1966	Nashville, TN	#3 Vanderbilt	53	Tennessee	52
86	January 9, 1967	Nashville, TN	Vanderbilt	65	Tennessee	59
87	February 18, 1967	Knoxville, TN	Tennessee	70	#9 Vanderbilt	53
88	January 8, 1968	Knoxville, TN	#6 Tennessee	64	#4 Vanderbilt	62
89	February 17, 1968	Nashville, TN	#9 Vanderbilt	75	#7 Tennessee	63
90	February 3, 1969	Knoxville, TN	Tennessee	65	Vanderbilt	61
91	March 3, 1969	Nashville, TN	#17 Tennessee	70	Vanderbilt	69
92	February 2, 1970	Nashville, TN	Tennessee	77	Vanderbilt	72^{2OT}
93	March 2, 1970	Knoxville, TN	Tennessee	83	Vanderbilt	76
94	February 1, 1971	Knoxville, TN	Vanderbilt	65	#11 Tennessee	60
95	March 1, 1971	Nashville, TN	#14 Tennessee	79	Vanderbilt	69
96	February 7, 1972	Nashville, TN	Tennessee	81	Vanderbilt	75
97	March 6, 1972	Knoxville, TN	Tennessee	87	Vanderbilt	74
98	February 5, 1973	Knoxville, TN	Tennessee	72	Vanderbilt	62
99	March 3, 1973	Nashville, TN	Vanderbilt	86	Tennessee	74
100	January 21, 1974	Knoxville, TN	#7 Vanderbilt	82	Tennessee	65
101	February 23, 1974	Nashville, TN	Tennessee	59	#4 Vanderbilt	53
102	January 20, 1975	Nashville, TN	#18 Tennessee	65	Vanderbilt	61
103	February 22, 1975	Knoxville, TN	Tennessee	75	Vanderbilt	71
104	January 12, 1976	Nashville, TN	Vanderbilt	77	#9 Tennessee	66
105	February 9, 1976	Knoxville, TN	#8 Tennessee	73	Vanderbilt	59
106	January 3, 1977	Nashville, TN	Tennessee	73	Vanderbilt	69
107	March 7, 1977	Knoxville, TN	#7 Tennessee	65	Vanderbilt	55

No.	Date	Location	Winning team		Losing team	
108	January 30, 1978	Nashville, TN	Vanderbilt	56	Tennessee	55
109	February 27, 1978	Knoxville, TN	Tennessee	59	Vanderbilt	46
110	January 22, 1979	Nashville, TN	Tennessee	71	#19 Vanderbilt	70
111	February 19, 1979	Knoxville, TN	Tennessee	83	#19 Vanderbilt	78
112	January 12, 1980	Knoxville, TN	Tennessee	71	Vanderbilt	63
113	February 9, 1980	Nashville, TN	Tennessee	51	Vanderbilt	48
114	January 17, 1981	Nashville, TN	#11 Tennessee	72	Vanderbilt	66
115	February 14, 1981	Knoxville, TN	#9 Tennessee	79	Vanderbilt	72
116	January 16, 1982	Knoxville, TN	Tennessee	71	Vanderbilt	69^{OT}
117	February 13, 1982	Nashville, TN	Tennessee	59	Vanderbilt	55
118	March 4, 1982	Lexington, KY	Tennessee	57	Vanderbilt	54
119	January 29, 1983	Knoxville, TN	Vanderbilt	61	Tennessee	60
120	February 24, 1983	Nashville, TN	Vanderbilt	69	#20 Tennessee	68
121	January 28, 1984	Nashville, TN	Tennessee	76	Vanderbilt	69
122	February 25, 1984	Knoxville, TN	Tennessee	67	Vanderbilt	61
123	January 16, 1985	Knoxville, TN	Tennessee	87	Vanderbilt	79
124	February 16, 1985	Nashville, TN	Vanderbilt	85	Tennessee	82
125	March 6, 1985	Birmingham, AL	Tennessee	71	Vanderbilt	51
126	January 15, 1986	Nashville, TN	Vanderbilt	60	Tennessee	59
127	February 15, 1986	Knoxville, TN	Vanderbilt	66	Tennessee	62
128	January 3, 1987	Nashville, TN	Tennessee	81	Vanderbilt	72
129	February 4, 1987	Knoxville, TN	Tennessee	79	Vanderbilt	69^{OT}
130	March 5, 1987	Atlanta, GA	Tennessee	74	Vanderbilt	57
131	January 9, 1988	Knoxville, TN	Tennessee	80	Vanderbilt	72
132	February 10, 1988	Nashville, TN	#17 Vanderbilt	90	Tennessee	62
133	February 1, 1989	Nashville, TN	Vanderbilt	68	Tennessee	56
134	March 4, 1989	Knoxville, TN	Tennessee	78	Vanderbilt	61
135	January 31, 1990	Knoxville, TN	Tennessee	73	Vanderbilt	72
136	March 3, 1990	Nashville, TN	Vanderbilt	98	Tennessee	74
137	March 19, 1990	Nashville, TN	Vanderbilt	89	Tennessee	85
138	January 8, 1991	Nashville, TN	Vanderbilt	108	Tennessee	68
139	February 9, 1991	Knoxville, TN	Tennessee	85	Vanderbilt	73
140	January 4, 1992	Knoxville, TN	Tennessee	91	Vanderbilt	75
141	February 22, 1992	Nashville, TN	Vanderbilt	89	Tennessee	84
142	January 27, 1993	Knoxville, TN	#11 Vanderbilt	82	Tennessee	65
143	March 2, 1993	Nashville, TN	#7 Vanderbilt	90	Tennessee	82^{OT}
144	January 26, 1994	Nashville, TN	Vanderbilt	85	Tennessee	73
145	March 1, 1994	Knoxville, TN	Vanderbilt	84	Tennessee	67
146	January 15, 1995	Nashville, TN	Tennessee	67	Vanderbilt	63
147	March 1, 1995	Knoxville, TN	Tennessee	62	Vanderbilt	58
148	January 6, 1996	Nashville, TN	Vanderbilt	65	Tennessee	55
149	February 24, 1996	Knoxville, TN	Tennessee	94	Vanderbilt	79
150	January 11, 1997	Knoxville, TN	Tennessee	75	Vanderbilt	65
151	February 12, 1997	Nashville, TN	Vanderbilt	66	Tennessee	53
152	January 10, 1998	Nashville, TN	Vanderbilt	80	Tennessee	79
153	February 21, 1998	Knoxville, TN	Tennessee	90	Vanderbilt	76
154	January 27, 1999	Nashville, TN	Tennessee	78	Vanderbilt	67
155	February 13, 1999	Knoxville, TN	Tennessee	63	Vanderbilt	62
156	January 12, 2000	Knoxville, TN	Vanderbilt	76	#12 Tennessee	73
157	February 19, 2000	Nashville, TN	Vanderbilt	85	#5 Tennessee	72
158	February 3, 2001	Knoxville, TN	#8 Tennessee	72	Vanderbilt	50
159	February 24, 2001	Nashville, TN	#22 Tennessee	78	Vanderbilt	70
160	February 2, 2002	Nashville, TN	Tennessee	67	Vanderbilt	65
161	February 23, 2002	Knoxville, TN	Vanderbilt	67	Tennessee	62
162	January 18, 2003	Knoxville, TN	Tennessee	71	Vanderbilt	66
163	March 8, 2003	Nashville, TN	Tennessee	70	Vanderbilt	65
164	January 14, 2004	Knoxville, TN	Tennessee	77	#23 Vanderbilt	66
165	March 3, 2004	Nashville, TN	Vanderbilt	61	Tennessee	58
166	January 8, 2005	Knoxville, TN	Vanderbilt	88	Tennessee	63
167	February 2, 2005	Nashville, TN	Vanderbilt	67	Tennessee	62
168	February 1, 2006	Knoxville, TN	#13 Tennessee	69	Vanderbilt	62
169	March 4, 2006	Nashville, TN	#11 Tennessee	68	Vanderbilt	59
170	January 10, 2007	Nashville, TN	Vanderbilt	82	#16 Tennessee	81
171	February 10, 2007	Knoxville, TN	Tennessee	84	#23 Vanderbilt	57
172	January 17, 2008	Knoxville, TN	#6 Tennessee	80	#16 Vanderbilt	60
173	February 26, 2008	Nashville, TN	#18 Vanderbilt	72	#1 Tennessee	69
174	January 20, 2009	Nashville, TN	Tennessee	76	Vanderbilt	63
175	February 14, 2009	Knoxville, TN	Tennessee	69	Vanderbilt	50
176	January 27, 2010	Knoxville, TN	#21 Vanderbilt	85	#14 Tennessee	76
177	February 9, 2010	Nashville, TN	#22 Vanderbilt	90	#12 Tennessee	71
178	January 15, 2011	Knoxville, TN	Tennessee	67	Vanderbilt	64
179	February 22, 2011	Nashville, TN	Tennessee	60	#18 Vanderbilt	51
180	January 24, 2012	Nashville, TN	Vanderbilt	65	Tennessee	47
181	March 3, 2012	Knoxville, TN	Tennessee	68	Vanderbilt	61
182	January 29, 2013	Knoxville, TN	Tennessee	58	Vanderbilt	57
183	February 13, 2013	Nashville, TN	Tennessee	58	Vanderbilt	46
184	February 5, 2014	Nashville, TN	Vanderbilt	64	Tennessee	60
185	March 1, 2014	Knoxville, TN	Tennessee	76	Vanderbilt	38
186	February 11, 2015	Nashville, TN	Tennessee	76	Vanderbilt	73^{OT}
187	February 26, 2015	Knoxville, TN	Vanderbilt	73	Tennessee	65
188	March 12, 2015	Nashville, TN	Tennessee	67	Vanderbilt	61
189	January 20, 2016	Knoxville, TN	Vanderbilt	88	Tennessee	74
190	March 1, 2016	Nashville, TN	Vanderbilt	86	Tennessee	69
191	March 10, 2016	Nashville, TN	Tennessee	67	Vanderbilt	65
192	January 14, 2017	Nashville, TN	Tennessee	87	Vanderbilt	75
193	February 22, 2017	Knoxville, TN	Vanderbilt	67	Tennessee	56
194	January 9, 2018	Nashville, TN	#24 Tennessee	92	Vanderbilt	84
195	January 23, 2018	Knoxville, TN	#22 Tennessee	67	Vanderbilt	62
196	January 23, 2019	Nashville, TN	#1 Tennessee	88	Vanderbilt	83^{OT}
197	February 19, 2019	Knoxville, TN	#5 Tennessee	58	Vanderbilt	46
198	January 18, 2020	Nashville, TN	Tennessee	66	Vanderbilt	45
199	February 18, 2020	Knoxville, TN	Tennessee	65	Vanderbilt	61
200	January 16, 2021	Knoxville, TN	#10 Tennessee	81	Vanderbilt	61
201	February 24, 2021	Nashville, TN	#25 Tennessee	70	Vanderbilt	58
202	January 18, 2022	Nashville, TN	#24 Tennessee	68	Vanderbilt	60
203	February 12, 2022	Knoxville, TN	#19 Tennessee	73	Vanderbilt	64
204	January 10, 2023	Knoxville, TN	#5 Tennessee	77	Vanderbilt	68
205	February 8, 2023	Nashville, TN	Vanderbilt	66	#6 Tennessee	65
206	January 27, 2024	Nashville, TN	#5 Tennessee	75	Vanderbilt	62
207	February 17, 2024	Knoxville, TN	#8 Tennessee	88	Vanderbilt	53
208	January 18, 2025	Nashville, TN	Vanderbilt	76	#6 Tennessee	75
209	February 15, 2025	Knoxville, TN	#5 Tennessee	81	Vanderbilt	76
210	February 21, 2026	Nashville, TN	Tennessee	69	#19 Vanderbilt	65
211	March 7, 2026	Knoxville, TN	#24 Vanderbilt	86	#23 Tennessee	82
212	March 13, 2026	Nashville, TN	#22 Vanderbilt	75	#25 Tennessee	68
Series: Tennessee leads 133–79

== Women's basketball ==
Tennessee–Vanderbilt women's basketball rivalry
- Tennessee Lady Volunteers Vanderbilt Commodores
- Sport: Basketball
- First meeting: January 18, 1976; Tennessee 96, Vanderbilt 27
- Latest meeting: March 1, 2026; Vanderbilt 87, Tennessee 77
- Next meeting: February 7, 2027; Nashville, Tennessee

Statistics
- Total meetings: 93 (per Tennessee); 92 (per Vanderbilt)
- All-time series: Tennessee leads, 80–12 (per Tennessee); Tennessee leads 79–12 (per Vanderbilt)
- Largest victory: Tennessee, 96–27 (1976)
- Longest win streak: Tennessee, 16 (2002–2008)
- Current win streak: Vanderbilt, 3 (2025–present)

Tennessee victories	Vanderbilt victories	Tie games

No.	Date	Location	Winning team		Losing team	
1	January 18, 1976	Nashville, TN	Tennessee	96	Vanderbilt	27
2	November 21, 1979	Nashville, TN	#4 Tennessee	77	Vanderbilt	53
3	December 6, 1981	Knoxville, TN	#10 Tennessee	99	Vanderbilt	77
4	January 4, 1982	Nashville, TN	#20 Tennessee	80	Vanderbilt	63
5	February 26, 1982	Lexington, KY	#8 Tennessee	80	Vanderbilt	75
6	January 12, 1983	Knoxville, TN	#11 Tennessee	98	Vanderbilt	70
7	February 19, 1983	Nashville, TN	#4 Tennessee	94	Vanderbilt	79
8	February 5, 1984	Nashville, TN	#7 Tennessee	82	Vanderbilt	73
9	February 26, 1984	Knoxville, TN	#10 Tennessee	74	Vanderbilt	72
10	January 16, 1985	Nashville, TN	Vanderbilt	84	Tennessee	77
11	February 16, 1985	Knoxville, TN	Tennessee	82	Vanderbilt	71
12	February 15, 1986	Knoxville, TN	#14 Tennessee	94	Vanderbilt	81
13	February 4, 1987	Nashville, TN	#14 Vanderbilt	77	#5 Tennessee	76
14	January 17, 1988	Knoxville, TN	#4 Tennessee	104	Vanderbilt	67
15	January 26, 1989	Nashville, TN	#2 Tennessee	80	Vanderbilt	60
16	February 22, 1990	Knoxville, TN	#4 Tennessee	88	Vanderbilt	77
17	December 6, 1990	Nashville, TN	Vanderbilt	80	#6 Tennessee	66
18	March 2, 1991	Albany, GA	#4 Tennessee	62	Vanderbilt	60
19	February 2, 1992	Knoxville, TN	#4 Tennessee	70	#13 Vanderbilt	53
20	January 30, 1993	Nashville, TN	#2 Tennessee	73	#1 Vanderbilt	68
21	January 31, 1994	Nashville, TN	#2 Tennessee	84	#9 Vanderbilt	82
22	February 13, 1994	Knoxville, TN	#2 Tennessee	79	#12 Vanderbilt	57
23	March 7, 1994	Chattanooga, TN	#1 Tennessee	82	#13 Vanderbilt	57
24	December 31, 1994	Nashville, TN	#1 Tennessee	72	#8 Vanderbilt	70
25	February 12, 1995	Knoxville, TN	#2 Tennessee	75	#7 Vanderbilt	55
26	March 6, 1995	Chattanooga, TN	#9 Vanderbilt	67	#2 Tennessee	61
27	January 19, 1996	Knoxville, TN	#6 Tennessee	85	#2 Vanderbilt	82
28	February 25, 1996	Nashville, TN	#5 Tennessee	79	#10 Vanderbilt	71
29	January 19, 1997	Nashville, TN	#9 Tennessee	92	#7 Vanderbilt	79^{OT}
30	February 17, 1997	Knoxville, TN	#8 Tennessee	64	#15 Vanderbilt	59
31	January 25, 1998	Knoxville, TN	#1 Tennessee	86	#9 Vanderbilt	54
32	February 16, 1998	Nashville, TN	#1 Tennessee	91	#14 Vanderbilt	60
33	February 28, 1998	Columbus, GA	#1 Tennessee	106	#14 Vanderbilt	45
34	February 7, 1999	Nashville, TN	#1 Tennessee	66	Vanderbilt	60
35	February 18, 1999	Knoxville, TN	#1 Tennessee	89	Vanderbilt	53
36	February 4, 2000	Knoxville, TN	#4 Tennessee	78	Vanderbilt	52
37	February 24, 2000	Nashville, TN	#2 Tennessee	59	Vanderbilt	57
38	March 4, 2000	Chattanooga, TN	#2 Tennessee	61	Vanderbilt	53
39	January 23, 2001	Nashville, TN	#3 Tennessee	70	#16 Vanderbilt	64
40	February 22, 2001	Knoxville, TN	#1 Tennessee	70	#18 Vanderbilt	66
41	March 3, 2001	Memphis, TN	#15 Vanderbilt	77	#1 Tennessee	74
42	February 2, 2002	Nashville, TN	#8 Vanderbilt	76	#2 Tennessee	59
43	February 16, 2002	Knoxville, TN	#3 Tennessee	75	#6 Vanderbilt	68
44	March 25, 2002	Ames, IA	#6 Tennessee	68	#4 Vanderbilt	63
45	February 2, 2003	Nashville, TN	#4 Tennessee	81	#17 Vanderbilt	67
46	February 27, 2003	Knoxville, TN	#3 Tennessee	91	#17 Vanderbilt	71
47	January 22, 2004	Knoxville, TN	#2 Tennessee	79	Vanderbilt	54

No.	Date	Location	Winning team		Losing team	
48	February 15, 2004	Nashville, TN	#3 Tennessee	94	Vanderbilt	88
49	January 16, 2005	Nashville, TN	#8 Tennessee	79	#17 Vanderbilt	65
50	February 13, 2005	Knoxville, TN	#5 Tennessee	72	#21 Vanderbilt	63
51	March 5, 2005	Greenville, SC	#5 Tennessee	76	#18 Vanderbilt	73
52	January 19, 2006	Nashville, TN	#1 Tennessee	80	#19 Vanderbilt	68
53	February 12, 2006	Knoxville, TN	#5 Tennessee	70	#22 Vanderbilt	67
54	January 25, 2007	Nashville, TN	#4 Tennessee	67	#15 Vanderbilt	57
55	February 25, 2007	Knoxville, TN	#2 Tennessee	73	#12 Vanderbilt	53
56	January 20, 2008	Knoxville, TN	#2 Tennessee	79	Vanderbilt	63
57	February 17, 2008	Nashville, TN	#1 Tennessee	81	#25 Vanderbilt	68
58	March 8, 2008	Nashville, TN	#3 Tennessee	63	#21 Vanderbilt	48
59	January 11, 2009	Nashville, TN	#24 Vanderbilt	74	#7 Tennessee	58
60	March 1, 2009	Knoxville, TN	#18 Tennessee	75	#19 Vanderbilt	66
61	January 17, 2010	Knoxville, TN	#4 Tennessee	64	Vanderbilt	57
62	February 8, 2010	Nashville, TN	#5 Tennessee	69	Vanderbilt	60
63	March 6, 2010	Duluth, GA	#4 Tennessee	68	Vanderbilt	49
64	January 15, 2011	Knoxville, TN	#5 Tennessee	68	Vanderbilt	56
65	February 13, 2011	Nashville, TN	#4 Tennessee	65	Vanderbilt	57
66	January 15, 2012	Knoxville, TN	#6 Tennessee	87	#25 Vanderbilt	64
67	February 9, 2012	Nashville, TN	Vanderbilt	93	#11 Tennessee	79
68	March 2, 2012	Nashville, TN	#13 Tennessee	68	#25 Vanderbilt	57
69	January 24, 2013	Nashville, TN	#9 Tennessee	83	Vanderbilt	75
70	February 17, 2013	Knoxville, TN	#12 Tennessee	83	Vanderbilt	64
71	January 12, 2014	Nashville, TN	Vanderbilt	74	#8 Tennessee	63
72	February 10, 2014	Knoxville, TN	#8 Tennessee	81	#18 Vanderbilt	53
73	January 5, 2015	Nashville, TN	#7 Tennessee	57	Vanderbilt	49
74	March 1, 2015	Knoxville, TN	#6 Tennessee	79	Vanderbilt	49
75	January 21, 2016	Knoxville, TN	#18 Tennessee	58	Vanderbilt	49
76	February 11, 2016	Nashville, TN	#25 Tennessee	69	Vanderbilt	51
77	January 5, 2017	Nashville, TN	Tennessee	70	Vanderbilt	57
78	January 22, 2017	Knoxville, TN	Tennessee	91	Vanderbilt	63
79	January 7, 2018	Knoxville, TN	#7 Tennessee	86	Vanderbilt	73
80	February 4, 2018	Nashville, TN	#12 Tennessee	74	Vanderbilt	64
81	February 3, 2019	Nashville, TN	Tennessee	82	Vanderbilt	65
82	February 28, 2019	Knoxville, TN	Vanderbilt	76	Tennessee	69
83	January 30, 2020	Nashville, TN	#22 Tennessee	78	Vanderbilt	69
84	February 23, 2020	Knoxville, TN	Tennessee	67	Vanderbilt	63
85	January 13, 2022	Nashville, TN	#5 Tennessee	65	Vanderbilt	51
86	February 13, 2022	Knoxville, TN	#13 Tennessee	66	Vanderbilt	52
87	January 8, 2023	Nashville, TN	Tennessee	84	Vanderbilt	71
88	February 12, 2023	Knoxville, TN	Tennessee	86	Vanderbilt	59
89	January 21, 2024	Knoxville, TN	Tennessee	73	Vanderbilt	64
90	February 18, 2024	Nashville, TN	Tennessee	86	Vanderbilt	61
91	January 19, 2025	Nashville, TN	Vanderbilt	71	#15 Tennessee	70
92	March 6, 2025	Greenville, SC	Vanderbilt	84	#18 Tennessee	76
93	March 1, 2026	Knoxville, TN	#5 Vanderbilt	87	Tennessee	77
Series: Tennessee leads 80–13

== Baseball ==
Tennessee–Vanderbilt baseball rivalry
- Tennessee Volunteers Vanderbilt Commodores
- Sport: Baseball
- First meeting: 1897; Vanderbilt 10, Tennessee 4
- Latest meeting: May 11, 2025; Vanderbilt 7, Tennessee 5
- Next meeting: May 24, 2025

Statistics
- Total meetings: 353
- All-time series: Tennessee leads, 189–168–2
- Largest victory: Tennessee, 20–1 (1970)
- Longest win streak: Tennessee, 21 (1965–1970)
- Current win streak: Vanderbilt, 2 (2025–present)

Baseball is arguably the most intense rivalry between the two teams, given both programs' rise to prominence in the 2000s. Tennessee leads the all time series 188–166–2. Vanderbilt controlled the series through much of the 2010s, winning two national titles in that stretch. In the 2020s, the series has gained national attention for its intensity.
