= 1987 SEC women's basketball tournament =

American college basketball postseason tournament

- Classification: Division I
- Teams: 10
- Site: Albany Civic Center; Albany, GA
- Champions: Auburn (2nd title)
- Winning coach: Joe Ciampi (2nd title)
- MVP: Vickie Orr (Auburn)
- Attendance: 14,700

The 1987 Southeastern Conference women's basketball tournament was the postseason women's basketball tournament for the Southeastern Conference (SEC) held at the Albany Civic Center in Albany, GA, from March 4 – March 7, 1987. The Auburn Tigers won the tournament and earned an automatic bid to the 1987 NCAA Division I women's basketball tournament.

== Seeds ==
All teams in the conference participated in the tournament. Teams were seeded by their conference record.

Seed	School	Conf. Record	Overall record	Tiebreaker
1	Auburn^{‡†}	8–1	31–2	
2	Georgia^{†}	7–2	27–5	
3	Ole Miss^{†}	7–2	25–5	
4	Tennessee^{†}	6–3	28–6	
5	LSU^{†}	6–3	20–8	
6	Vanderbilt^{†}	4–5	23–10	
7	Kentucky	3–6	17–11	
8	Alabama	2–7	19–10	
9	Mississippi State	2–7	13–17	
10	Florida	0–9	12–16	
‡ – SEC regular season champions, and tournament No. 1 seed. † – Received a bye in the conference tournament. Overall records include all games played in the SEC Tournament.

== Schedule ==
Game	Matchup^{#}	Score
First Round – Wed, Mar 4
1	No. 7 Kentucky vs. No. 10 Florida	75–53
2	No. 8 Alabama vs. No. 9 Mississippi State	88–76
Quarterfinals – Thur, Mar 5
3	No. 1 Auburn vs. No. 8 Alabama	89–61
5	No. 2 Georgia vs. No. 7 Kentucky	67–64
4	No. 3 Ole Miss vs. No. 6 Vanderbilt	64–65
6	No. 4 Tennessee vs. No. 5 LSU	64–63
Semifinals – Fri, Mar 6
7	No. 1 Auburn vs. No. 4 Tennessee	102–96
8	No. 2 Georgia vs. No. 6 Vanderbilt	54–52
Finals – Sat, Mar 7
9	No. 1 Auburn vs. No. 2 Georgia	83–57
# – Rankings denote tournament seed

== Bracket ==
First round Wed, Mar 4
8	Alabama	88
9	Mississippi State	76
7	Kentucky	75
10	Florida	53

Quarterfinals; Thur, Mar 5
1	Auburn	89
8	Alabama	61
4	Tennessee	64
5	LSU	63
2	Georgia	67
7	Kentucky	64
3	Ole Miss	64
6	Vanderbilt	65

Semifinals; Fri, Mar 6
1	Auburn	102
4	Tennessee	96
2	Georgia	54
6	Vanderbilt	52

Championship; Sat, Mar 7
1	Auburn	83
2	Georgia	57
