= Southeastern Conference Women's Basketball Player of the Year =

SEC Women's Basketball Player of the Year
- Awarded for: the most outstanding women's basketball player in the Southeastern Conference
- Country: United States
- First award: 1987
- Currently held by: Mikayla Blakes, Vanderbilt

The Southeastern Conference (SEC) Women's Basketball Player of the Year is an award given to the most outstanding player in the Southeastern Conference.

Although the SEC began its women's postseason tournament in 1980, and began official regular-season conference play in the 1982–83 season, a Player of the Year award was not created until the 1986–87 season.

Currently, two bodies vote for Players of the Year. The league's coaches have selected a Player of the Year since the 1986–87 season, and the Associated Press began presenting its version of the award in the 1996–97 season. The two voting bodies have split their honors three times, most recently in 2012–13 when the AP honored A'dia Mathies of Kentucky and the coaches honored Meighan Simmons of Tennessee.

The school with the most SEC Player of the Year award winners is Tennessee, with 9 total awards. Six SEC members have yet to have a winner—charter SEC members Alabama and Ole Miss; 2012 arrivals Missouri and Texas A&M; and 2024 arrival Oklahoma

While ten players have won at least a share of the award twice, only one, A'ja Wilson of South Carolina, has won three times.

== Key ==
†	Co-Players of the Year
*	Awarded a national player of the year award that same season: the Naismith College Player of the Year, the John R. Wooden Award, or the Wade Trophy
A	Associated Press selection
C	SEC coaches selection
Player (X)	Denotes the number of times the player received the SEC Player of the Year award at that point

== Winners ==
Season	Player^{[a]}	School	Position	Class	Reference(s)
1986–87	Katrina McClain	Georgia			
1987–88	Vickie Orr	Auburn	C	Senior	
1988–89	Bridgette Gordon	Tennessee	F	Senior	
1989–90	Carolyn Jones	Auburn	G	Junior	
1990–91	Carolyn Jones (2)	Auburn	G	Senior	
1991–92	Dena Head	Tennessee	F	Senior	
1992–93	Lauretta Freeman	Auburn	F	Senior	
1993–94	Nikki McCray	Tennessee	F	Junior	
1994–95	Nikki McCray (2)	Tennessee	F	Senior	
1995–96	Saudia Roundtree*	Georgia			
1996–97	DeLisha Milton*	Florida			
1997–98	Chamique Holdsclaw*	Tennessee	F	Junior	
1998–99	Chamique Holdsclaw* (2)	Tennessee	F	Senior	
1999–00	Kelly Miller	Georgia			
2000–01	Kelly Miller (2)	Georgia			
2001–02^{†}	Chantelle Anderson^{C}	Vanderbilt			
2001–02^{†}	LaToya Thomas^{A}	Mississippi State			
2002–03	LaToya Thomas (2)	Mississippi State			
2003–04	Shameka Christon	Arkansas			
2004–05	Seimone Augustus*	LSU	F	Junior	
2005–06	Seimone Augustus* (2)	LSU	F	Senior	
2006–07	Candace Parker*	Tennessee	F	Sophomore	
2007–08	Sylvia Fowles	LSU	C	Senior	
2008–09	DeWanna Bonner	Auburn	G	Senior	
2009–10	Victoria Dunlap	Kentucky	F	Junior	
2010–11^{†}	Victoria Dunlap^{A} (2)	Kentucky	F	Senior	
2010–11^{†}	Shekinna Stricklen^{C}	Tennessee	G/F	Junior	
2011–12	A'dia Mathies	Kentucky	G	Junior	
2012–13^{†}	A'dia Mathies^{A} (2)	Kentucky	G	Senior	
2012–13^{†}	Meighan Simmons^{C}	Tennessee	G	Junior	
2013–14	Tiffany Mitchell	South Carolina	G	Sophomore	
2014–15	Tiffany Mitchell (2)	South Carolina	G	Junior	
2015–16	A'ja Wilson	South Carolina	F	Sophomore	
2016–17	A'ja Wilson (2)	South Carolina	F	Junior	
2017–18	A'ja Wilson* (3)	South Carolina	F	Senior	
2018–19	Teaira McCowan	Mississippi State	C	Senior	
2019–20	Rhyne Howard	Kentucky	G	Sophomore	
2020–21	Rhyne Howard (2)	Kentucky	G	Junior	
2021–22	Aliyah Boston*	South Carolina	F	Junior	
2022–23	Aliyah Boston (2)	South Carolina	F	Senior	
2023–24	Angel Reese	LSU	F	Senior	
2024–25	Madison Booker	Texas	F	Sophomore	
2025–26	Mikayla Blakes	Vanderbilt	G	Sophomore	

== Winners by school ==
School (year joined)	Winners	Years
Tennessee (1932)	9	1989, 1992, 1994, 1995, 1998, 1999, 2007, 2011^{†}, 2013^{†}
South Carolina (1991)	7	2014, 2015, 2016, 2017, 2018, 2022, 2023
Kentucky (1932)	6	2010, 2011^{†}, 2012, 2013^{†}, 2020, 2021
Auburn (1932)	5	1988, 1990, 1991, 1993, 2009
Georgia (1932)	4	1987, 1996, 2000, 2001
LSU (1932)	4	2005, 2006, 2008, 2024
Mississippi State (1932)	3	2002^{†}, 2003, 2019
Vanderbilt (1932)	2	2002^{†}, 2026
Arkansas (1991)	1	2004
Florida (1932)	1	1997
Texas (2024)	1	2025
Alabama (1932)	0	—
Oklahoma (2024)	0	—
Ole Miss (1932)	0	—
Missouri (2012)	0	—
Texas A&M (2012)	0	—

== Footnotes ==
- ^{a} If no special demarcation indicates which award the player won that season, then she had earned all of the awards available for that year.
