= 1982 SEC women's basketball tournament =

American college basketball postseason tournament

- Classification: Division I
- Teams: 9
- Site: Memorial Coliseum; Lexington, KY
- Champions: Kentucky (1st title)
- Winning coach: Terry Hall (1st title)
- MVP: Valerie Still (Kentucky)
- Attendance: 8,111

1981–82 SEC women's basketball standings
	Conf.				Overall
Team	W		L	PCT	W		L	PCT
No. 4 Tennessee	7	–	1	.875	22	–	10	.688
Ole Miss	7	–	1	.875	27	–	5	.844
No. 13 Kentucky †	6	–	2	.750	24	–	8	.750
Auburn	6	–	2	.750	24	–	5	.828
Georgia	5	–	3	.625	21	–	9	.700
Alabama	4	–	4	.500	16	–	13	.552
LSU	3	–	5	.375	18	–	13	.581
Vanderbilt	1	–	7	.125	20	–	14	.588
Florida	1	–	7	.125	13	–	16	.448
Mississippi State	0	–	8	.000	11	–	15	.423
† 1982 SEC tournament winner Rankings from AP poll

The 1982 Southeastern Conference women's basketball tournament was the postseason women's basketball tournament for the Southeastern Conference (SEC) held at Memorial Coliseum in Lexington, Kentucky, from February 25–28, 1982. The Kentucky Wildcats won the tournament by beating the Tennessee Lady Volunteers and earned an automatic bid to the 1982 NCAA Division I women's basketball tournament.

This was the final year the SEC was not officially sponsoring the tournament. Florida did not attend the tournament, leaving the field of teams at 9 and marking the only time all teams didn't attend the tournament

== Seeds ==
All teams in the conference participated in the tournament. Teams were seeded by their conference record.

Seed	School	Conference record	Overall record	Tiebreaker
1	Tennessee^{‡†}	7–1	22–10	
2	Ole Miss^{†}	7–1	27–5	
3	Kentucky^{†}	6–2	24–8	
4	Auburn^{†}	6–2	24–5	
5	Georgia	5–3	21–9	
6	Alabama	4–4	16–13	
7	LSU	3–5	18–13	
8	Vanderbilt	1–7	20–14	
9	Mississippi State	0–8	11–15	
‡ – SEC regular season champions, and tournament No. 1 seed. † – Received a bye in the conference tournament. Overall records include all games played in the SEC Tournament.

== Schedule ==
Game	Matchup^{#}	Score
First Round – Thurs, Feb 25
1	No. 8 Vanderbilt vs. No. 9 Mississippi State	87–67
Quarterfinal – Fri, Feb 26
2	No. 1 Tennessee vs. No. 8 Vanderbilt	80–75
3	No. 2 Ole Miss vs. No. 7 LSU	73–77
4	No. 3 Kentucky vs. No. 6 Alabama	82–76
5	No. 4 Auburn vs. No. 5 Georgia	65–66
Semifinal – Sat, Feb 27
6	No. 1 Tennessee vs. No. 5 Georgia	55–44
7	No. 7 LSU vs. No. 3 Kentucky	71–85
Championship – Sun, Feb 28
8	No. 1 Tennessee vs. No. 3 Kentucky	74–80
# – Rankings denote tournament seed

== Tournament ==
First round
8	Vanderbilt	87
9	Mississippi State	67

Quarterfinals
1	Tennessee	80
8	Vanderbilt	75
4	Auburn	65
5	Georgia	66
2	Ole Miss	73
7	LSU	77
3	Kentucky	82
6	Alabama	76

Semifinals
1	Tennessee	55
5	Georgia	44
7	LSU	71
3	Kentucky	85

Championship game
1	Tennessee	74
3	Kentucky	80
Third place
5	Georgia	77
7	LSU	66

== All-Tournament team ==
- Janet Harris, Georgia
- Patty Jo Hedges, Kentucky
- Valerie Still, Kentucky (MVP)
- Joyce Walker, LSU
- Tanya Haave, Tennessee
- Mary Ostrowski, Tennessee
