= 2012 SEC women's basketball tournament =

American postseason women's college basketball tournament

- Classification: Division I
- Teams: 12
- Site: Bridgestone Arena; Nashville, Tennessee
- Champions: Tennessee Lady Volunteers (16th title)
- Winning coach: Pat Summitt (16th title)
- MVP: Glory Johnson (Tennessee)
- Attendance: 46,130
- Television: Fox Sports South (First Round and quarterfinals), ESPNU (Semifinals), ESPN2 (Championship game)

The 2012 SEC women's basketball tournament took place at the Bridgestone Arena in Nashville, Tennessee from March 1–4, 2012. The Tennessee Lady Volunteers won the tournament and received the SEC's automatic bid to the 2012 NCAA women's basketball tournament by defeating the LSU Lady Tigers 70–58 in the championship game.

== Seeds ==
All teams in the conference participated in the tournament. Teams were seeded by their conference record.

| Seed | School | Conference record | Overall record | Tiebreaker |
|---|---|---|---|---|
| 1 | Kentucky^{‡†} | 13–3 | 28–7 | |
| 2 | Tennessee^{†} | 12–4 | 27–9 | |
| 3 | Georgia^{†} | 11–5 | 22–9 | |
| 4 | LSU^{†} | 10–6 | 23–11 | |
| 5 | Arkansas | 10–6 | 24–9 | |
| 6 | South Carolina | 10–6 | 25–10 | |
| 7 | Vanderbilt | 9–7 | 23–10 | |
| 8 | Florida | 8–8 | 20–13 | |
| 9 | Auburn | 5–11 | 13–17 | |
| 10 | Mississippi State | 4–12 | 14–16 | |
| 11 | Alabama | 2–14 | 12–19 | |
| 12 | Ole Miss | 2–14 | 12–18 | |
‡ – SEC regular season champions, and tournament No. 1 seed. † – Received a bye in the conference tournament. Overall records include all games played in the SEC Tournament.

== Schedule ==
| Game | Matchup^{#} | Score |
First Round – Thurs, Mar 1
| 1 | No. 5 Arkansas vs. No. 12 Ole Miss | 64–47 |
| 2 | No. 6 South Carolina vs. No. 11 Alabama | 57–38 |
| 3 | No. 7 Vanderbilt vs. No. 10 Mississippi State | 67–51 |
| 4 | No. 8 Florida vs. No. 9 Auburn | 70–60 |
Quarterfinal – Fri, Mar 7
| 5 | No. 1 Kentucky vs. No. 8 Florida | 71–67 |
| 6 | No. 2 Tennessee vs. No. 7 Vanderbilt | 68–57 |
| 7 | No. 3 Georgia vs. No. 6 South Carolina | 55–59 |
| 8 | No. 4 LSU vs. No. 5 Arkansas | 41–40 |
Semifinal – Sat, Mar 8
| 9 | No. 1 Kentucky vs. No. 4 LSU | 61–72 |
| 10 | No. 2 Tennessee vs. No. 6 South Carolina | 74–58 |
Championship – Sun, Mar 4
| 11 | No. 4 LSU vs. No. 2 Tennessee | 58–70 |
# – Rankings denote tournament seed

== Bracket ==
First Round; Thursday, March 4 Fox Sports South
8 | Florida | 70
9 | Auburn | 60
5 | Arkansas | 64
12 | Mississippi | 47
7 | Vanderbilt | 67
10 | Mississippi State | 51
6 | South Carolina | 57
11 | Alabama | 38

Second Round; Friday, March 2 Fox Sports South
1 | Kentucky | 71
8 | Florida | 67
4 | LSU | 41
5 | Arkansas | 40
2 | Tennessee | 68
7 | Vanderbilt | 57
3 | Georgia | 55
6 | South Carolina | 59

Semi-Finals; Saturday, March 3 ESPNU
1 | Kentucky | 61
4 | LSU | 72
2 | Tennessee | 74
6 | South Carolina | 58

Finals; Sunday, March 4 ESPN2
4 | LSU | 58
2 | Tennessee | 70

== All-tournament team ==
- Glory Johnson, Tennessee (MVP)
- Shekinna Stricklen, Tennessee
- A'dia Mathies, UK
- Keyla Snowden, UK
- LaSondra Barrett, LSU
- Adrienne Webb, LSU
