= 1991 SEC women's basketball tournament =

American college basketball postseason tournament

- Classification: Division I
- Teams: 10
- Site: Albany Civic Center; Albany, GA
- Champions: LSU (1st title)
- Winning coach: Sue Gunter (1st title)
- MVP: Pokey Chatman (LSU)
- Attendance: 18,172

1990–91 SEC women's basketball standings
	Conf.				Overall
Team	W		L	PCT	W		L	PCT
No. 3 Georgia	9	–	0	1.000	28	–	4	.875
No. 6 Auburn	7	–	2	.778	26	–	6	.813
No. 4 Tennessee	6	–	3	.667	30	–	5	.857
No. 8 LSU^{†}	5	–	4	.556	24	–	7	.774
Kentucky	4	–	5	.444	20	–	9	.690
Ole Miss	4	–	5	.444	20	–	9	.690
Vanderbilt	4	–	5	.444	19	–	12	.613
Florida	3	–	6	.333	17	–	11	.607
Alabama	3	–	6	.333	17	–	12	.586
Mississippi State	0	–	9	.000	7	–	20	.259
† 1991 SEC tournament winner Rankings from AP poll

The 1991 Southeastern Conference women's basketball tournament was the postseason women's basketball tournament for the Southeastern Conference (SEC) held at the Albany Civic Center in Albany, Georgia, from March 1 – 4, 1991. The LSU Tigers won the tournament and earned an automatic bid to the 1991 NCAA Division I women's basketball tournament. LSU won the tournament by beating Tennessee in the championship game.

== Schedule ==
Game	Matchup^{#}	Score
First Round – Fri, Mar 1
1	No. 8 Florida vs. No. 9 Alabama	75–95
2	No. 7 Ole Miss vs. No. 10 Mississippi State	75–56
Quarterfinals – Sat, Mar 2
3	No. 1 Georgia vs. No. 9 Alabama	78–69
4	No. 2 Auburn vs. No. 7 Ole Miss	76–50
5	No. 3 Tennessee vs. No. 6 Vanderbilt	62–60
6	No. 4 LSU vs. No. 5 Kentucky	96–76
Semifinals – Sun, Mar 3
7	No. 1 Georgia vs. No. 4 LSU	74–83
8	No. 2 Auburn vs. No. 3 Tennessee	62–70
Finals – Mon, Mar 4
9	No. 4 LSU vs. No. 3 Tennessee	80–75
# – Rankings denote tournament seed

== Bracket ==
First round Fri, Mar 1
8	Florida	75
9	Alabama	95
7	Ole Miss	75
10	Mississippi State	56

Quarterfinals; Sat, Mar 2
1	Georgia	78
9	Alabama	69
4	LSU	96
5	Kentucky	76
2	Auburn	76
7	Ole Miss	50
3	Tennessee	62
6	Vanderbilt	60

Semifinals; Sun, Mar 3
1	Georgia	74
4	LSU	83
2	Auburn	62
3	Tennessee	70

Championship; Mon, Mar 4
4	LSU	80
3	Tennessee	75

Asterisk denotes game ended in overtime.

== All-Tournament team ==
- Carolyn Jones, Auburn
- Dana "Pokey" Chatman, LSU (MVP)
- Annette Jackson-Lowery, LSU
- Sheila Johnson, LSU
- Daedra Charles, Tennessee
