= 2003 Women's National Invitation Tournament =

College baseketball postseason tournament

- Teams: 32
- Finals site: Ferrell Center, Waco, Texas
- Champions: Auburn (1st title)
- Runner-up: Baylor (2nd title game)
- Winning coach: Joe Ciampi (1st title)
- MVP: Natasha Brackett (Auburn)
- Attendance: 7,414

The 2003 Women's National Invitation Tournament was a single-elimination tournament of 32 NCAA Division I teams. These teams were not selected to participate in the 2003 Women's NCAA tournament. It was the sixth edition of the postseason Women's National Invitation Tournament (WNIT).

In the championship game, Auburn defeated the host Baylor by a score of 64–63 to capture their first WNIT title.

== See also ==
- 2003 National Invitation Tournament
