= Joe Ciampi =

American basketball coach

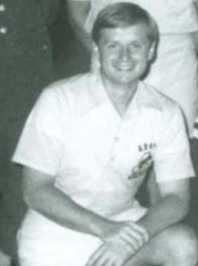
- Ciampi with Army in the late 1970s

Biographical details
- Born: September 25, 1946 (age 80); Glen Lyon, Pennsylvania, U.S.

Playing career
- 1966–1967: Mansfield State

Coaching career (HC unless noted)
- 1968–1972: Nanticoke Area HS (boys' asst.)
- 1972–1977: Marlboro Central HS (boys')
- 1977–1979: Army
- 1979–2004: Auburn
- 2012–2013: Atlanta Dream (assistant)

Head coaching record
- Overall: 73–23 (.760) (high school); 607–213 (.740) (college)
- Tournaments: 27–16 (NCAA Division I); 5–0 (WNIT)

Accomplishments and honors

Championships
- 4× SEC tournament (1981, 1987, 1990, 1997); SEC West Division (1983); 3× SEC regular season (1987–89); 3× NCAA Regional—Final Four (1988, 1989, 1990); Women's National Invitation Tournament (2003)

Awards
- 3× SEC Coach of the Year (1985, 1988, 1989)
- Women's Basketball Hall of Fame

Joseph R. Ciampi (born September 25, 1946) is an American former basketball coach. Starting off in boys basketball from 1968 to 1977, Ciampi was an assistant coach for a Nanticoke high school and the head coach for Marlboro High School in New York. In women's basketball, Ciampi coached the Army Black Knights women's basketball team from 1977 to 1979 before joining the Auburn Tigers women's basketball team in 1979. With the Tigers, Ciampi and his team reached the NCAA Division I women's basketball tournament final consecutively from 1988 to 1990. After winning his 600th game as a Division I coach in January 2004, Ciampi retired from basketball in March 2004.

With his stints with the Army Knights and Tigers, Ciampi retired with 607 wins and 213 losses. In the mid 2000s, Ciampi's record of 607 wins was in the top 15 overall wins by a Division I basketball coach during the late 2000s. After working as a women's basketball sports commentator for Comcast during the early 2010s, Ciampi briefly returned to basketball as an assistant coach for the Atlanta Dream from 2012 to 2013. Ciampi was inducted into the Women's Basketball Hall of Fame in 2005 and the Alabama Sports Hall of Fame in 2006.

== Early life and education ==
On September 25, 1946, Ciampi was born in Glen Lyon, Pennsylvania. At Nanticoke Area High School in Nanticoke, Pennsylvania, Ciampi started playing basketball and baseball. Ciampi then attended Mansfield State College (now Mansfield University of Pennsylvania), graduating with a bachelor's degree in elementary education in 1968. At Mansfield State, Ciampi played varsity basketball in the 1966–67 season.

== Coaching career ==
=== High school basketball (1968–1977) ===
After graduating from college, Ciampi began his career as a high school gym teacher. In boys' basketball, Ciampi was an assistant coach from 1968 to 1972 at Nanticoke Area High School, helping Nanticoke reach an 82–19 record in four years. Continuing his boys basketball experience in Marlboro, New York, Ciampi worked as the head coach for Marlboro High School between 1972 and 1977. With Marlboro, Ciampi had 73 wins and 23 losses.

=== Army (1977–1979) ===
In 1977, Ciampi joined the United States Military Academy to be head coach for Army Cadets women's basketball, the program's first head coach at the NCAA Division I level. With Army, Ciampi went 18–5 in 1977–78 and 21–5 in 1978–79 for a total of 39 wins and 10 losses.

=== Auburn (1979–2004) ===
In 1979, Ciampi joined Auburn University as head coach of the Auburn Tigers women's basketball team. Inheriting a program that had won only 17 games in the past two seasons, Ciampi led Auburn to a 17–13 record in the 1979–80 season. Auburn would later reach the final of the NCAA Division I women's basketball tournament three consecutive times from 1988 to 1990.

Apart from the NCAA tournament, Ciampi led Auburn to the 2003 Women's National Invitation Tournament title. While coaching the Tigers, Ciampi earned his 600th win as a Division I basketball coach in January 2004. That year, Ciampi ended his Auburn head coach position with 568 wins and 203 losses. Upon his retirement from basketball in March 2004, Ciampi had an overall college basketball record of 607 wins and 213 losses. With his 607 wins, Ciampi was in the top 15 for the most NCAA Division I basketball wins during the mid 2000s. By the end of the 2010s, Ciampi's 607 wins made him tied for 34th place alongside Mike Granel for the most basketball games won overall by a Division I coach.

=== Later career ===
After retiring from Auburn, Ciampi was a consultant to several NCAA Division I women's basketball teams. In the early 2010s, Ciampi was a sports commentator for SportSouth on women's basketball games played in the Southeastern Conference.

In 2012, Ciampi came out of retirement to become an assistant coach for the Atlanta Dream in the WNBA. He continued to coach for the Dream until 2013. The Dream went 19–15 in 2012 under head coaches Marynell Meadors and Fred Williams and 17–17 in 2013 under Williams, qualifying for the playoffs in both years, including as runners-up in the 2013 WNBA Finals.

Ciampi continues to be a women's basketball analyst for the Auburn Sports Network and SEC Network.

== Awards and honors ==
In 2005, Ciampi was inducted into the Women's Basketball Hall of Fame. The following year, Ciampi became a part of the Alabama Sports Hall of Fame in 2006.

== Personal life ==
Ciampi is married and has four children.

== Head coaching record ==
=== College ===
Record table
Season	Team	Overall	Conference	Standing	Postseason
Army Cadets (NCAA Division I independent) (1977–1979)
1977–78	Army	18–5			
1978–79	Army	21–5			
Army:		39–10 (.796)			
Auburn Tigers (Southeastern Conference) (1979–2004)
1979–80	Auburn	17–13			
1980–81	Auburn	26–7			
1981–82	Auburn	24–5			NCAA Division I First Round
1982–83	Auburn	24–8	6–2	T–1st (West)	NCAA Division I Sweet 16
1983–84	Auburn	19–10	4–4	4th (West)	
1984–85	Auburn	25–6	5–3	2nd (West)	NCAA Division I Sweet 16
1985–86	Auburn	24–6	6–3	T–2nd	NCAA Division I Sweet 16
1986–87	Auburn	31–2	8–1	1st	NCAA Division I Elite Eight
1987–88	Auburn	32–3	9–0	1st	NCAA Division I Runner-up
1988–89	Auburn	32–2	9–0	1st	NCAA Division I Runner-up
1989–90	Auburn	28–7	7–2	T–2nd	NCAA Division I Runner-up
1990–91	Auburn	26–6	7–2	2nd	NCAA Division I Elite Eight
1991–92	Auburn	17–12	4–7	T–7th	
1992–93	Auburn	25–4	9–2	T–2nd	NCAA Division I Sweet 16
1993–94	Auburn	20–10	6–5	6th	
1994–95	Auburn	17–10	5–6	8th	NCAA Division I Second Round
1995–96	Auburn	23–9	6–5	T–5th	NCAA Division I Elite Eight
1996–97	Auburn	22–10	5–7	T–7th	NCAA Division I Second Round
1997–98	Auburn	16–11	4–10	T–9th	
1998–99	Auburn	20–9	8–6	4th	NCAA second round
1999–2000	Auburn	22–8	9–5	4th	NCAA second round
2000–01	Auburn	17–12	5–9	T–8th	
2001–02	Auburn	16–13	3–11	T–10th	
2002–03	Auburn	23–11	5–9	8th	WNIT Champion
2003–04	Auburn	22–9	9–5	3rd	NCAA Division I Second Round
Auburn:		568–203 (.737)	145–104 (.582)		
Total:		607–213 (.740)			
National champion Postseason invitational champion Conference regular season champion Conference regular season and conference tournament champion Division regular season champion Division regular season and conference tournament champion Conference tournament champion

== See also ==
- List of college women's basketball career coaching wins leaders
