= 1980 SEC women's basketball tournament =

American college basketball midseason tournament

- Classification: Division I
- Teams: 10
- Site: Stokely Athletic Center; Knoxville, Tennessee
- Champions: Tennessee (1st title)
- Winning coach: Pat Summitt (1st title)
- MVP: Jill Rankin (Tennessee)
- Attendance: 4,085

The 1980 Southeastern Conference women's basketball tournament was a midseason women's basketball tournament for the Southeastern Conference (SEC) held at the Stokely Athletic Center in Knoxville, Tennessee, from February 7 – 10, 1980. It was the first SEC women's basketball tournament in history and the Tennessee Lady Volunteers won the tournament defeating the Ole Miss Rebels 85-71. Tennessee earned an automatic bid to the 1980 AIAW National Division I Basketball Championship for their victory.

Notably, women’s basketball was not officially sponsored by the SEC until the 1982-83 season.

== Seeds ==
All teams in the conference participated in the tournament.

Seed	School	Overall Record	Conference Record
1	Tennessee^{‡†}	19–3	4–0
2	Kentucky^{†}	15–2	2–1
3	Ole Miss^{†}	18–11	3–1
4	LSU^{†}	15–10	1–2
5	Georgia^{†}	14–9	3–1
6	Auburn^{†}	14–6	4–0
7	Alabama	9–12	1–4
8	Mississippi State	10–14	2–5
9	Vanderbilt	11–10	2–2
10	Florida	4–14	1–7
‡ – SEC tournament No. 1 seed. † – Received a bye in the conference tournament.

== Schedule ==
Game	Matchup^{#}	Score
First Round – Thurs, Feb 7
1	No. 8 Mississippi State vs. No. 10 Florida	62–68
2	No. 7 Alabama vs. No. 9 Vanderbilt	69–63
Quarterfinal – Fri, Feb 8
3	No. 1 Tennessee vs. No. 10 Florida	118–44
4	No. 2 Kentucky vs. No. 7 Alabama	77–69
5	No. 3 Ole Miss vs. No. 5 Georgia	80–70
6	No. 4 LSU vs. No. 6 Auburn	64–70
Semifinal – Sat, Feb 9
7	No. 1 Tennessee vs. No. 6 Auburn	72–61
8	No. 2 Kentucky vs. No. 3 Ole Miss	62–79
Championship – Sun, Feb 10
9	No. 1 Tennessee vs. No. 3 Ole Miss	85–71
# – Rankings denote tournament seed

== Bracket ==
First round Thurs, Feb 7
8	Mississippi State	62
10	Florida	68
7	Alabama	69
9	Vanderbilt	63

Quarterfinals; Fri, Feb 8
1	Tennessee	118
10	Florida	44
4	LSU	64
6	Auburn	70
2	Kentucky	77
7	Alabama	69
3	Ole Miss	80
5	Georgia	70

Semifinals; Sat, Feb 9
1	Tennessee	72
6	Auburn	61
2	Kentucky	62
3	Ole Miss	79

Championship; Sun, Feb 10
1	Tennessee	85
3	Ole Miss	71
Third place
2	Kentucky	88
6	Auburn	59

Asterisk denotes game ended in overtime.

== All-Tournament team ==
- Lori Monroe, Auburn
- Valerie Still, Kentucky
- Peggie Gillom, Ole Miss
- Carol Ross, Ole Miss
- Cindy Noble, Tennessee
- Jill Rankin, Tennessee (MVP)
- Holly Warlick, Tennessee
