= 1984 SEC women's basketball tournament =

- Classification: Division I
- Teams: 10
- Site: Stegeman Coliseum; Athens, Georgia
- Champions: Georgia (2nd title)
- Winning coach: Andy Landers (2nd title)
- MVP: Cassandra Crumpton (Alabama)
- Attendance: 9,274

1983–84 SEC women's basketball standings
	Conf.				Overall
Team	W		L	PCT	W		L	PCT
Eastern Division
No. 3 Georgia †	7	–	1	.875	30	–	3	.909
No. 15 Tennessee	7	–	1	.875	23	–	10	.697
Kentucky	2	–	6	.250	15	–	13	.536
Vanderbilt	2	–	6	.250	23	–	9	.719
Florida	2	–	6	.250	19	–	9	.679
Western Division
No. 10 Ole Miss	6	–	2	.750	24	–	6	.800
No. 8 LSU	5	–	3	.625	23	–	7	.767
No. 12 Alabama	5	–	3	.625	23	–	9	.719
Auburn	4	–	4	.500	19	–	10	.655
Mississippi State	0	–	8	.000	12	–	14	-
† 1984 SEC tournament winner Rankings from AP poll

The 1984 Southeastern Conference women's basketball tournament was the postseason women's basketball tournament for the Southeastern Conference (SEC) held at the Stegeman Coliseum in Athens, Georgia, from March 2 – 5, 1984. The Georgia Lady Bulldogs won the tournament and earned an automatic bid to the 1984 NCAA Division I women's basketball tournament. They also became the first team to win multiple titles and the first to win back-to-back SEC titles.

== Seeds ==
All teams in the conference participated in the tournament. Teams were seeded by their conference record.

Seed	School	Conference record	Overall record	Tiebreaker
1E	Georgia^{‡†}	7–1	30–3	
1W	Ole Miss^{†}	6–2	24–6	
2E	Tennessee^{†}	7–1	23–10	
2W	LSU^{†}	5–3	23–7	
3E	Kentucky^{†}	2–6	15–13	
3W	Alabama^{†}	5–3	23–9	
4E	Vanderbilt	2–6	23–9	
4W	Auburn	4–4	19–10	
5E	Florida	2–6	19–9	
5W	Mississippi State	0–8	12–14	
‡ – SEC regular season champions, and tournament No. 1 seed. † – Received a bye in the conference tournament. Overall records include all games played in the SEC Tournament.

== Schedule ==
Game	Matchup^{#}	Score
First Round – Fri, Mar 2
1	No. 4W Auburn vs. No. 5E Florida	75–65
2	No. 4E Vanderbilt vs. No. 5W Mississippi State	72–47
Quarterfinal – Sat, Mar 3
3	No. 1E Georgia vs. No. 4W Auburn	102–72
4	No. 1W Ole Miss vs. No. 4E Vanderbilt	73–78
5	No. 2E Tennessee vs. No. 3W Alabama	66–85
6	No. 2W LSU vs. No. 3E Kentucky	91–81
Semifinal – Sun, Mar 4
7	No. 1E Georgia vs. No. 2W LSU	84–77
8	No. 4E Vanderbilt vs. No. 3W Alabama	73–83
Championship – Mon, Mar 5
9	No. 1E Georgia vs. No. 3W Alabama	74–65
# – Rankings denote tournament seed

== Bracket ==
First round Fri, Mar 2
4W	Auburn	75
5E	Florida	65
4E	Vanderbilt	72
5W	Mississippi State	47

Quarterfinals; Sat, Mar 3
1E	Georgia	102
4W	Auburn	72
2W	LSU	91
3E	Kentucky	81
1W	Ole Miss	73
4E	Vanderbilt	78
2E	Tennessee	66
3W	Alabama	85

Semifinals; Sun, Mar 4
1E	Georgia	84
2W	LSU	77
4E	Vanderbilt	73
3W	Alabama	83

Championship; Mon, Mar 5
1E	Georgia	74
3W	Alabama	65

Asterisk denotes game ended in overtime.

== All-Tournament team ==
- Cassandra Crumpton, Alabama (MVP)
- Teresa Edwards, Georgia
- Janet Harris, Georgia
- Wanda Holloway, Georgia
- Joyce Walker, LSU
- Donna Atkinson, Vanderbilt
