= 1997 SEC women's basketball tournament =

American college basketball postseason tournament

- Classification: Division I
- Teams: 12
- Site: McKenzie Arena; Chattanooga, TN
- Champions: Auburn (4th title)
- Winning coach: Joe Ciampi (4th title)
- MVP: Laticia Morris (Auburn)
- Attendance: 37,806

The 1997 Southeastern Conference women's basketball tournament was the postseason women's basketball tournament for the Southeastern Conference (SEC) held at the McKenzie Arena in Chattanooga, Tennessee, from February 28 – March 3, 1997. The Auburn Tigers won the tournament and earned an automatic bid to the 1997 NCAA Division I women's basketball tournament.

== Seeds ==
All teams in the conference participated in the tournament. Teams were seeded by their conference record.

Seed	School	Conference record	Overall record	Tiebreaker
1	Georgia^{‡†}	11–1	25–6	
2	Alabama^{†}	10–2	25–7	
3	Florida^{†}	9–3	24–9	
4	LSU^{†}	9–3	25–5	
5	Tennessee	8–4	29–10	
6	Vanderbilt	6–6	20–11	
7	Arkansas	5–7	18–10	
8	Auburn	5–7	22–10	
9	Ole Miss	5–7	16–11	
10	Kentucky	2–10	8–19	
11	Mississippi State	1–11	11–16	
12	South Carolina	1–11	12–15	
‡ – SEC regular season champions, and tournament No. 1 seed. † – Received a bye in the conference tournament. Overall records include all games played in the SEC Tournament.

== Schedule ==
Game	Matchup^{#}	Score
First Round – Fri, Feb 28
1	No. 8 Auburn vs. No. 9 Ole Miss	72–64
2	No. 5 Tennessee vs. No. 12 South Carolina	75–48
3	No. 7 Arkansas vs. No. 10 Kentucky	71–60
4	No. 6 Vanderbilt vs. No. 11 Mississippi State	70–42
Quarterfinal – Sat, Mar 1
5	No. 1 Georgia vs. No. 8 Auburn	47–75
6	No. 4 LSU vs. No. 5 Tennessee	99–100
7	No. 2 Alabama vs. No. 7 Arkansas	85–63
8	No. 3 Florida vs. No. 6 Vanderbilt	68–54
Semifinal – Sun, Mar 2
9	No. 8 Auburn vs. No. 5 Tennessee	61–59
10	No. 2 Alabama vs. No. 3 Florida	73–83
Championship – Mon, Mar 3
11	No. 8 Auburn vs. No. 3 Florida	52–47
# – Rankings denote tournament seed

== Bracket ==
First round Fri, Feb 28
8	Auburn	72
9	Ole Miss	64
5	Tennessee	75
12	South Carolina	48
7	Arkansas	71
10	Kentucky	60
6	Vanderbilt	70
11	Mississippi State	42

Quarterfinals; Sat, Mar 1
1	Georgia	47
8	Auburn	75
4	LSU	99
5	Tennessee	100
2	Alabama	85
7	Arkansas	63
3	Florida	68
6	Vanderbilt	54

Semifinals; Sun, Mar 2
8	Auburn	61
5	Tennessee	59
2	Alabama	73
3	Florida	83

Championship; Mon, Mar 3
8	Auburn	52
3	Florida	47
