= 1983 SEC women's basketball tournament =

American college basketball postseason tournament

- Classification: Division I
- Teams: 10
- Site: Stokely Athletic Center; Knoxville, Tennessee
- Champions: Georgia (1st title)
- Winning coach: Andy Landers (1st title)
- MVP: Teresa Edwards (Georgia)
- Attendance: 5,962

1982–83 SEC women's basketball standings
	Conf.				Overall
Team	W		L	PCT	W		L	PCT
Eastern Division
No. 9 Tennessee	7	–	1	.875	25	–	8	.758
No. 11 Kentucky	6	–	2	.750	23	–	5	.821
No. 8 Georgia ^{†}	4	–	4	.500	27	–	7	.794
Vanderbilt	2	–	6	.250	12	–	14	.462
Florida	1	–	7	.125	11	–	16	.407
Western Division
No. 13 Ole Miss	6	–	2	.750	26	–	6	.813
No. 20 LSU	6	–	2	.750	20	–	7	.741
No. 14 Auburn	6	–	2	.750	24	–	8	.750
Alabama	2	–	6	.250	16	–	13	.552
Mississippi State	0	–	8	.000	15	–	13	.536
† 1983 SEC tournament winner Rankings from AP poll

The 1983 Southeastern Conference women's basketball tournament was the postseason women's basketball tournament for the Southeastern Conference (SEC) held at the Stokely Athletic Center in Knoxville, Tennessee, from March 3 – 6, 1983. The Georgia Lady Bulldogs won the tournament by beating Ole Miss and earned an automatic bid to the 1983 NCAA Division I women's basketball tournament.

== Seeds ==
All teams in the conference participated in the tournament. Teams were seeded by their conference record.

Seed	School	Conference record	Overall record	Tiebreaker
1E	Tennessee^{‡†}	7–1	25–8	
1W	Ole Miss^{†}	6–2	26–6	
2W	LSU^{†}	6–2	20–7	
2E	Kentucky^{†}	6–2	23–5	
3W	Auburn^{†}	6–2	24–8	
3E	Georgia^{†}	8–5	27–7	
4E	Vanderbilt	2–6	12–14	
4W	Alabama	2–6	16–13	
5E	Florida	1–7	11–16	
5W	Mississippi State	0–8	15–13	
‡ – SEC regular season champions, and tournament No. 1 seed. † – Received a bye in the conference tournament. Overall records include all games played in the SEC Tournament.

== Schedule ==
Game	Matchup^{#}	Score
First Round – Thurs, Mar 3
1	No. 4W Alabama vs. No. 5E Florida	69–63
2	No. 4E Vanderbilt vs. No. 5W Mississippi State	51–53
Quarterfinal – Fri, Mar 4
3	No. 1E Tennessee vs. No. 4W Alabama	91–73
4	No. 1W Ole Miss vs. No. 5W Mississippi State	59–56
5	No. 2E Kentucky vs. No. 3W Auburn	70–85
6	No. 2W LSU vs. No. 3E Georgia	78–79
Semifinal – Sat, Mar 5
7	No. 1E Tennessee vs. No. 3E Georgia	65–71
8	No. 1W Ole Miss vs. No. 3W Auburn	72–62
Championship – Sun, Mar 6
9	No. 3E Georgia vs. No. 1W Ole Miss	72–69
# – Rankings denote tournament seed

== Bracket ==
First round Thurs, Mar 3
4W	Alabama	69
5E	Florida	63
4E	Vanderbilt	51
5W	Mississippi State	53

Quarterfinals; Fri, Mar 4
1E	Tennessee	91
4W	Alabama	73
2W	LSU	78
3E	Georgia	79
1W	Ole Miss	59
5W	Mississippi State	56
2E	Kentucky	70
3W	Auburn	85

Semifinals; Sat, Mar 5
1E	Tennessee	65
3E	Georgia	71
1W	Ole Miss	72
3W	Auburn	62

Championship; Sun, Mar 6
3E	Georgia	72
1W	Ole Miss	69
Third place
1E	Tennessee	83
3W	Auburn	75

Asterisk denotes game ended in overtime.

== All-Tournament team ==
- Becky Jackson, Auburn
- Teresa Edwards, Georgia (MVP)
- Lisa O'Connor, Georgia
- Joyce Walker, LSU
- Eugenia Conner, Ole Miss
- Tanya Haave, Tennessee
