= 1981 SEC women's basketball tournament =

American college basketball midseason tournament

- Classification: Division I
- Teams: 10
- Site: Pete Maravich Assembly Center; Baton Rouge, LA
- Champions: Auburn (1st title)
- Winning coach: Joe Ciampi (1st title)
- MVP: Becky Jackson (Auburn)
- Attendance: 1,600

The 1981 Southeastern Conference women's basketball tournament was the postseason women's basketball tournament for the Southeastern Conference (SEC) held at the Pete Maravich Assembly Center in Baton Rouge, Louisiana, from January 29 – February 1, 1981. The Auburn Tigers won the tournament by beating their rivals, the Alabama Crimson Tide in the championship game, however

Notably, women’s basketball was not officially sponsored by the SEC until the 1982-83 season. Also, the winner did not earn an automatic bid to the 1981 AIAW National Division I Basketball Championship.

== Seeds ==
All teams in the conference participated in the tournament. All teams were seeded by a vote of the 10 SEC coaches on Jan. 22. The criteria used for balloting included SEC competition, the difficulty of schedule, the won-lost record and statistical information throughout the season. Each coach could not vote for his or her team.

Seed	School	Overall Record	Conference Record
1	Tennessee^{‡†}	25–6	3–0
2	Kentucky^{†}	25–6	0–0
3	Auburn^{†}	26–7	4–2
4	Ole Miss^{†}	14–12	2–1
5	Georgia^{†}	27–10	1–2
6	LSU^{†}	17–15	1–3
7	Mississippi State	17–12	3–1
8	Alabama	21–12	3–2
9	Vanderbilt	12–16	2–2
10	Florida	11–17	0–6
‡ – SEC tournament No. 1 seed. † – Received a bye in the conference tournament.

== Schedule ==
Game	Matchup^{#}	Score
First Round – Thurs, Jan 29
1	No. 8 Alabama vs. No. 10 Florida	67–54
2	No. 7 Mississippi State vs. No. 9 Vanderbilt	84–76
Quarterfinal – Fri, Jan 30
3	No. 1 Tennessee vs. No. 8 Alabama	71–77
4	No. 2 Kentucky vs. No. 7 Mississippi State	106–82
5	No. 3 Auburn vs. No. 6 LSU	73–71
6	No. 4 Ole Miss vs. No. 5 Georgia	68–75
Semifinal – Sat, Jan 31
7	No. 8 Alabama vs. No. 5 Georgia	80–66
8	No. 2 Kentucky vs. No. 3 Auburn	66–70
Championship – Sun, Feb 1
9	No. 8 Alabama vs. No. 3 Auburn	50–61
# – Rankings denote tournament seed

== Bracket ==
First round Thurs, Jan 29
8	Alabama	67
10	Florida	54
7	Mississippi State	84
9	Vanderbilt	76

Quarterfinals; Fri, Jan 30
1	Tennessee	71
8	Alabama	77
4	Ole Miss	68
5	Georgia	75
2	Kentucky	106
7	Mississippi State	82
3	Auburn*	73
6	LSU	71

Semifinals; Sat, Jan 31
8	Alabama	80
5	Georgia	66
2	Kentucky	66
3	Auburn	70

Championship; Sun, Feb 1
8	Alabama	50
3	Auburn	61
Third place
2	Kentucky	62
5	Georgia	73

Asterisk denotes game ended in overtime.

== All-Tournament team ==
- Mary Beasly, Alabama
- Leslie Payne, Alabama
- Becky Jackson, Auburn (MVP)
- Angie Hannah, Auburn
- Valerie Still, Kentucky
