= 2001 SEC women's basketball tournament =

American college basketball postseason tournament

- Classification: Division I
- Teams: 12
- Site: The Pyramid; Memphis, TN
- Champions: Georgia (4 title)
- Winning coach: Andy Landers (4 title)
- MVP: Chantelle Anderson (Vanderbilt)
- Attendance: 32,793

The 2001 Southeastern Conference women's basketball tournament was the postseason women's basketball tournament for the Southeastern Conference (SEC) held at The Pyramid in Memphis, Tennessee, from March 1–4, 2001. The Georgia Lady Bulldogs won the tournament and earned an automatic bid to the 2001 NCAA Division I women's basketball tournament.

== Seeds ==
All teams in the conference participated in the tournament. Teams were seeded by their conference record.

Seed	School	Conference record	Overall record	Tiebreaker
1	Tennessee^{‡†}	14–0	31–3	
2	Georgia^{†}	11–3	27–6	
3	Florida^{†}	11–3	24–6	
4	Vanderbilt^{†}	8–6	24–10	
5	LSU	8–6	20–11	
6	Arkansas	6–8	20–13	
7	South Carolina	6–8	11–17	
8	Alabama	5–9	19–12	
9	Auburn	5–9	17–12	
10	Ole Miss	4–10	17–13	
11	Mississippi State	4–10	17–14	
12	Kentucky	2–12	6–21	
‡ – SEC regular season champions, and tournament No. 1 seed. † – Received a bye in the conference tournament. Overall records include all games played in the SEC Tournament.

== Schedule ==
Game	Matchup^{#}	Score
First Round – Thu, Mar 1
1	No. 8 Alabama vs. No. 9 Auburn	59–55
2	No. 5 LSU vs. No. 12 Kentucky	72–57
3	No. 7 South Carolina vs. No. 10 Ole Miss	68–75
4	No. 6 Arkansas vs. No. 11 Mississippi State	94–76
Quarterfinal – Fri, Mar 2
5	No. 1 Tennessee vs. No. 8 Alabama	82–52
6	No. 4 Vanderbilt vs. No. 5 LSU	70–58
7	No. 2 Georgia vs. No. 10 Ole Miss	80–61
8	No. 3 Florida vs. No. 6 Arkansas	69–78
Semifinal – Sat, Mar 3
9	No. 1 Tennessee vs. No. 4 Vanderbilt	74–77
10	No. 2 Georgia vs. No. 6 Arkansas	63–44
Championship – Sun, Mar 4
11	No. 4 Vanderbilt vs. No. 2 Georgia	60–62
# – Rankings denote tournament seed

== Bracket ==
First round Thu, Mar 1
8	Alabama	59
9	Auburn	55
5	LSU	72
12	Kentucky	57
7	South Carolina	68
10	Ole Miss	75
6	Arkansas	94
11	Mississippi State	76

Quarterfinals; Fri, Mar 2
1	Tennessee	82
8	Alabama	52
4	Vanderbilt	70
5	LSU	58
2	Georgia	80
10	Ole Miss	61
3	Florida	69
6	Arkansas	78

Semifinals; Sat, Mar 3
1	Tennessee	74
4	Vanderbilt	77
2	Georgia	63
6	Arkansas	44

Championship; Sun, Mar 4
4	Vanderbilt	60
2	Georgia	62
