= 1986 SEC women's basketball tournament =

- Classification: Division I
- Teams: 10
- Site: Georgia Coliseum; Athens, GA
- Champions: Georgia (3rd title)
- Winning coach: Andy Landers (3rd title)
- MVP: Katrina McClain (Georgia)
- Attendance: 9,418

The 1986 Southeastern Conference women's basketball tournament was the postseason women's basketball tournament for the Southeastern Conference (SEC) held at the Georgia Coliseum in Athens, GA, from Feb 28 – March 3, 1986. The Georgia Lady Bulldogs won the tournament and earned an automatic bid to the 1986 NCAA Division I women's basketball tournament.

== Seeds ==
All teams in the conference participated in the tournament. Teams were seeded by their conference record.

Seed	School	Conf. Record	Overall record	Tiebreaker
1	Georgia^{‡†}	9–0	30–2	
2	Auburn^{†}	6–3	24–6	
3	LSU^{†}	6–3	27–6	
4	Ole Miss^{†}	6–3	24–8	
5	Tennessee^{†}	5–4	24–10	
6	Kentucky^{†}	4–5	18–11	
7	Vanderbilt	4–5	22–9	
8	Alabama	3–6	20–9	
9	Florida	2–7	10–18	
10	Mississippi State	0–9	8–20	
‡ – SEC regular season champions, and tournament No. 1 seed. † – Received a bye in the conference tournament. Overall records include all games played in the SEC Tournament.

== Schedule ==
Game	Matchup^{#}	Score
First Round – Fri, Feb 28
1	No. 7 Vanderbilt vs. No. 10 Mississippi State	83–69
2	No. 8 Alabama vs. No. 9 Florida	71–57
Quarterfinals – Sat, Mar 1
3	No. 1 Georgia vs. No. 8 Alabama	88–71
5	No. 2 Auburn vs. No. 7 Vanderbilt	79–89
4	No. 3 LSU vs. No. 6 Kentucky	67–66
6	No. 4 Ole Miss vs. No. 5 Tennessee	83–78
Semifinals – Sun, Mar 2
7	No. 1 Georgia vs. No. 4 Ole Miss	76–68
8	No. 7 Vanderbilt vs. No. 3 LSU	60–83
Finals – Mon, Mar 3
9	No. 1 Georgia vs. No. 3 LSU	94–72
# – Rankings denote tournament seed

== Bracket ==
First round Fri, Feb 28
8	Alabama	71
9	Florida	57
7	Vanderbilt	83
10	Mississippi State	69

Quarterfinals; Sat, Mar 1
1	Georgia	88
8	Alabama	71
4	Ole Miss	83
5	Tennessee	78
2	Auburn	79
7	Vanderbilt	89
3	LSU	67
6	Kentucky	66

Semifinals; Sun, Mar 2
1	Georgia	76
4	Ole Miss	68
7	Vanderbilt	60
3	LSU	83

Championship; Mon, Mar 3
1	Georgia	94
3	LSU	72
