= 2000 SEC women's basketball tournament =

American college basketball postseason tournament

- Classification: Division I
- Teams: 12
- Site: McKenzie Arena; Chattanooga TN
- Champions: Tennessee (10 title)
- Winning coach: Pat Summitt (10 title)
- MVP: LaToya Thomas (Mississippi State)
- Attendance: 41,185

The 2000 Southeastern Conference women's basketball tournament was the postseason women's basketball tournament for the Southeastern Conference (SEC) held at the McKenzie Arena in Chattanooga, Tennessee, from March 2–5, 2000. The Tennessee Lady Volunteers won the tournament and earned an automatic bid to the 2000 NCAA Division I women's basketball tournament.

== Seeds ==
All teams in the conference participated in the tournament. Teams were seeded by their conference record.

Seed	School	Conference record	Overall record	Tiebreaker
1	Georgia^{‡†}	13–1	32–4	
2	Tennessee^{†}	13–1	33–4	
3	LSU^{†}	11–3	25–7	
4	Auburn^{†}	9–5	22–8	
5	Mississippi State	8–6	24–8	
6	Vanderbilt	6–8	21–13	
7	Florida	6–8	21–13	
8	Alabama	5–9	15–14	
9	Kentucky	5–9	15–14	
10	Arkansas	4–10	17–15	
11	South Carolina	3–11	13–15	
12	Ole Miss	1–13	12–16	
‡ – SEC regular season champions, and tournament No. 1 seed. † – Received a bye in the conference tournament. Overall records include all games played in the SEC Tournament.

== Schedule ==
Game	Matchup^{#}	Score
First Round – Thu, Mar 2
1	No. 8 Alabama vs. No. 9 Kentucky	63–67
2	No. 5 Mississippi State vs. No. 12 Ole Miss	75–59
3	No. 7 Florida vs. No. 10 Arkansas	96–86
4	No. 6 Vanderbilt vs. No. 11 South Carolina	80–58
Quarterfinal – Fri, Mar 3
5	No. 1 Georgia vs. No. 9 Kentucky	63–45
6	No. 4 Auburn vs. No. 5 Mississippi State	56–66
7	No. 2 Tennessee vs. No. 7 Florida	91–79
8	No. 3 LSU vs. No. 6 Vanderbilt	46–59
Semifinal – Sat, Mar 4
9	No. 1 Georgia vs. No. 5 Mississippi State	61–62
10	No. 2 Tennessee vs. No. 6 Vanderbilt	61–53
Championship – Sun, Mar 5
11	No. 5 Mississippi State vs. No. 2 Tennessee	67–70
# – Rankings denote tournament seed

== Bracket ==
First round Thu, Mar 2
8	Alabama	63
9	Kentucky	67
5	Mississippi State	75
12	Ole Miss	59
7	Florida	96
10	Arkansas	86
6	Vanderbilt	80
11	South Carolina	58

Quarterfinals; Fri, Mar 3
1	Georgia	63
9	Kentucky	45
4	Auburn	56
5	Mississippi State	66
2	Tennessee	91
7	Florida	79
3	LSU	46
6	Vanderbilt	59

Semifinals; Sat, Mar 4
1	Georgia	61
5	Mississippi State	62
2	Tennessee	61
6	Vanderbilt	53

Championship; Sun, Mar 5
5	Mississippi State	67
2	Tennessee	70
