= Vickie Orr =

American basketball player

Personal information
- Born: February 25, 1967 (age 59) Hartselle, Alabama, U.S.
- Listed height: 6 ft 3 in (1.91 m)

Career information
- College: Auburn (1985–1989)

Career highlights
- 3× Kodak All-American (1987–1989); 2× All-American – USBWA (1988, 1989); SEC Player of the Year (1988); 2× First-team All-SEC (1988, 1989); SEC Tournament MVP (1987); 2× All-SEC (1986, 1987); Co-SEC Freshman of the Year (1986)
Medals
Women's basketball
Representing the United States
Olympic Games
Bronze medal – third place	1992 Barcelona	Team competition
FIBA World Championship
Gold medal – first place	1990 Malaysia	Team competition

Victoria Elaine Orr (born February 25, 1967) is an American former women's basketball player. She was a member of the United States women's national basketball team during the late 1980s and the early 1990s, collecting two medals during her international career. Born in Hartselle, Alabama, Orr played college basketball for Auburn University. In May 2013, she was inducted into the Alabama Sports Hall of Fame.

== Auburn statistics ==
Legend
GP	Games played	GS	Games started	MPG	Minutes per game
FG%	Field goal percentage	3P%	3-point field goal percentage	FT%	Free throw percentage
RPG	Rebounds per game	APG	Assists per game	SPG	Steals per game
BPG	Blocks per game	PPG	Points per game	**Bold**	Career high

Year	Team	GP	Points	FG%	3P%	FT%	RPG	APG	SPG	BPG	PPG
1985-86	Auburn	30	395	55.5%	--	66.3%	7.8	0.5	**1.3**	1.1	13.2
1986-87	Auburn	33	550	**60.4%**	--	65.6%	7.6	0.4	1.2	**1.7**	**16.7**
1987-88	Auburn	**35**	**565**	53.8%	0.0%	**76.7%**	6.8	**0.8**	1.2	1.3	16.1
1988-89	Auburn	33	525	56.7%	0.0%	74.8%	**8.6**	0.4	**1.3**	1.7	15.9
TOTAL	Auburn	131	2035	56.5%	0.0%	70.9%	7.7	0.5	1.3	1.5	15.5

== USA Basketball ==
Orr was named to the first USA Basketball Women's Junior National Team (now called the U19 team). The team participated in the inaugural Junior World Championship, held in Colorado Springs, Colorado, in August 1985. The team won four games and lost two, ending up in fifth place. Orr averaged 3.8 points per game.

Orr was selected to be a member of the team representing the US at the 1987 World University Games held in Zagreb, Yugoslavia. However, Orr was unable to play as she had to have her appendix removed in Yugoslavia. The USA team won four of the five contests. In the opening game against Poland, Gordon was the leading scorer for the US with 18 points. After winning their next game against Finland, the USA faced the host team Yugoslavia. The game went to overtime, but Yugoslavia prevailed, 93–89. The USA faced China in the next game. They won 84–83, but they needed to win by at least five points to remain in medal contention. They won the final game against Canada to secure fifth place.

Orr was a member of the USA National team at the 1990 World Championships, held in Kuala Lumpur, Malaysia. The team won their opening round games fairly easily, with the closest of the first three games a 27-point victory over Czechoslovakia. Then they faced Cuba, a team that had beaten the US in exhibition matches only a few weeks earlier. The USA team was losing at halftime, but came back to win 87–78. The USA team found itself behind at halftime to Canada in their next game, but came back to win easily 95–70. After an easy match against Bulgaria, the USA team faced Czechoslovakia again, end achieved an almost identical result, winning 87–59. In the title match, the USA team won the gold medal with a score of 88–78. Orr averaged 7.9 points per game and had nine blocks over the course of the event, second highest on the team.

== Personal life ==
Orr is the mother of Auburn men's basketball player Austin Wiley.
