= 2002 SEC women's basketball tournament =

American college basketball postseason tournament

- Classification: Division I
- Teams: 12
- Site: Gaylord Entertainment Center; Nashville, TN
- Champions: Vanderbilt (3rd title)
- Winning coach: Jim Foster (3rd title)
- MVP: Zuzana Klimešová (Vanderbilt)
- Attendance: 41,888

The 2002 Southeastern Conference women's basketball tournament was the postseason women's basketball tournament for the Southeastern Conference (SEC) held at the Gaylord Entertainment Center in Nashville, Tennessee, from February 28 – March 3, 2002. The Vanderbilt Commodores won the tournament and earned an automatic bid to the 2002 NCAA Division I women's basketball tournament.

== Seeds ==
All teams in the conference participated in the tournament. Teams were seeded by their conference record.

Seed	School	Conference record	Overall record	Tiebreaker
1	Tennessee^{‡†}	13–1	29–5	
2	South Carolina^{†}	10–4	25–7	
3	Vanderbilt^{†}	10–4	30–7	
4	LSU^{†}	8–6	18–12	
5	Mississippi State	8–6	19–12	
6	Florida	8–6	18–11	
7	Arkansas	7–7	20–12	
8	Alabama	7–7	19–12	
9	Georgia	6–8	19–11	
10	Ole Miss	3–11	11–17	
11	Auburn	3–11	16–13	
12	Kentucky	1–13	9–20	
‡ – SEC regular season champions, and tournament No. 1 seed. † – Received a bye in the conference tournament. Overall records include all games played in the SEC Tournament.

== Schedule ==
Game	Matchup^{#}	Score
First Round – Thu, Feb 28
1	No. 5 Mississippi State vs. No. 12 Kentucky	72–75
2	No. 6 Florida vs. No. 11 Auburn	57–70
3	No. 7 Arkansas vs. No. 10 Ole Miss	78–60
4	No. 8 Alabama vs. No. 9 Georgia	60–64
Quarterfinal – Fri, Mar 1
5	No. 1 Tennessee vs. No. 9 Georgia	81–67
6	No. 2 South Carolina vs. No. 7 Arkansas	61–79
7	No. 3 Vanderbilt vs. No. 11 Auburn	55–39
8	No. 4 LSU vs. No. 12 Kentucky	74–62
Semifinal – Sat, Mar 2
9	No. 1 Tennessee vs. No. 4 LSU	80–81
10	No. 3 Vanderbilt vs. No. 7 Arkansas	81–78
Championship – Sun, Mar 3
11	No. 4 LSU vs. No. 3 Vanderbilt	48–63
# – Rankings denote tournament seed

== Bracket ==
First round Thu, Feb 28
8	Alabama	60
9	Georgia	64
5	Mississippi State	72
12	Kentucky	75
6	Florida	57
11	Auburn	70
7	Arkansas	78
10	Ole Miss	60

Quarterfinals; Fri, Mar 1
1	Tennessee	81
9	Georgia	67
4	LSU	74
12	Kentucky	62
3	Vanderbilt	55
11	Auburn	39
2	South Carolina	61
7	Arkansas	79

Semifinals; Sat, Mar 2
1	Tennessee	80
4	LSU	81
3	Vanderbilt	81
7	Arkansas	78

Championship; Sun, Mar 3
4	LSU	48
3	Vanderbilt	63
