= 1992 SEC women's basketball tournament =

American college basketball postseason tournament

- Classification: Division I
- Teams: 12
- Site: Albany Civic Center; Albany, GA
- Champions: Tennessee (5th title)
- Winning coach: Pat Summit (5th title)
- MVP: Dena Head (Tennessee)
- Attendance: 12,318

The 1992 Southeastern Conference women's basketball tournament was the postseason women's basketball tournament for the Southeastern Conference (SEC) held at the Albany Civic Center in Albany, Georgia, from March 6 – 9, 1992. The Tennessee Lady Volunteers won the tournament and earned an automatic bid to the 1992 NCAA Division I women's basketball tournament.

== Seeds ==
All teams in the conference participated in the tournament. Teams were seeded by their conference record.

Seed	School	Conference record	Overall record	Tiebreaker
1	Ole Miss^{‡†}	11–0	29–3	
2	Tennessee^{†}	10–1	28–3	
3	Alabama^{†}	7–4	23–7	
4	Georgia^{†}	6–5	19–11	
5	Vanderbilt	6–5	22–9	
6	Kentucky	5–6	16–14	
7	Mississippi State	4–7	15–13	
8	Auburn	4–7	17–12	
9	Florida	4–7	15–13	
10	LSU	4–7	16–13	
11	Arkansas	3–8	11–14	
12	South Carolina	2–9	13–15	
‡ – SEC regular season champions, and tournament No. 1 seed. † – Received a bye in the conference tournament. Overall records include all games played in the SEC Tournament.

== Schedule ==
Game	Matchup^{#}	Score
First Round – Fri, Mar 6
1	No. 8 Auburn vs. No. 9 Florida	70–53
2	No. 5 Vanderbilt vs. No. 12 South Carolina	58–47
3	No. 7 Mississippi State vs. No. 10 LSU	56–61
4	No. 6 Kentucky vs. No. 11 Arkansas	79–63
Quarterfinal – Sat, Mar 7
5	No. 1 Ole Miss vs. No. 8 Auburn	58–52
6	No. 4 Georgia vs. No. 5 Vanderbilt	58–57
7	No. 2 Tennessee vs. No. 10 LSU	70–65
8	No. 3 Alabama vs. No. 6 Kentucky	87–95
Semifinal – Sun, Mar 8
9	No. 1 Ole Miss vs. No. 4 Georgia	60–71
10	No. 2 Tennessee vs. No. 6 Kentucky	90–84
Championship – Mon, Mar 9
11	No. 4 Georgia vs. No. 2 Tennessee	66–73
# – Rankings denote tournament seed

== Bracket ==
First round Fri, Mar 6
8	Auburn	70
9	Florida	53
5	Vanderbilt	58
12	South Carolina	47
7	Mississippi State	56
10	LSU	61
6	Kentucky	79
11	Arkansas	63

Quarterfinals; Sat, Mar 7
1	Ole Miss	58
8	Auburn	52
4	Georgia	58
5	Vanderbilt	57
2	Tennessee	70
10	LSU	65
3	Alabama	87
6	Kentucky	95

Semifinals; Sun, Mar 8
1	Ole Miss	60
4	Georgia	71
2	Tennessee	90
6	Kentucky	84

Championship; Mon, Mar 9
4	Georgia	66
2	Tennessee	73
