= 1999 SEC women's basketball tournament =

American college basketball postseason tournament

- Classification: Division I
- Teams: 12
- Site: McKenzie Arena; Chattanooga TN
- Champions: Tennessee (9 title)
- Winning coach: Pat Summitt (9 title)
- MVP: Chamique Holdsclaw (Tennessee)
- Attendance: 43,221

The 1999 Southeastern Conference women's basketball tournament was the postseason women's basketball tournament for the Southeastern Conference (SEC) held at the McKenzie Arena in Chattanooga, Tennessee, from February 25–28, 1999. The Tennessee Lady Volunteers won the tournament and earned an automatic bid to the 1999 NCAA Division I women's basketball tournament.

== Seeds ==
All teams in the conference participated in the tournament. Teams were seeded by their conference record.

Seed	School	Conference record	Overall record	Tiebreaker
1	Tennessee^{‡†}	13–1	31–3	
2	LSU^{†}	10–4	22–8	
3	Georgia^{†}	9–5	27–7	
4	Auburn^{†}	8–6	20–9	
5	Alabama	7–7	20–11	
6	Mississippi State	7–7	17–11	
7	Kentucky	7–7	21–11	
8	Florida	6–8	19–14	
9	Vanderbilt	6–8	13–14	
10	Ole Miss	6–8	15–13	
11	Arkansas	5–9	20–14	
12	South Carolina	0–14	11–16	
‡ – SEC regular season champions, and tournament No. 1 seed. † – Received a bye in the conference tournament. Overall records include all games played in the SEC Tournament.

== Schedule ==
Game	Matchup^{#}	Score
First Round – Thu, Feb 25
1	No. 8 Florida vs. No. 9 Vanderbilt	64–61
2	No. 5 Alabama vs. No. 12 South Carolina	82–71
3	No. 7 Kentucky vs. No. 10 Ole Miss	75–59
4	No. 6 Mississippi State vs. No. 11 Arkansas	79–70
Quarterfinal – Fri, Feb 26
5	No. 1 Tennessee vs. No. 8 Florida	92–80
6	No. 4 Auburn vs. No. 5 Alabama	72–76
7	No. 2 LSU vs. No. 7 Kentucky	71–81
8	No. 3 Georgia vs. No. 6 Mississippi State	72–66
Semifinal – Sat, Feb 27
9	No. 1 Tennessee vs. No. 5 Alabama	80–69
10	No. 7 Kentucky vs. No. 3 Georgia	62–68
Championship – Sun, Feb 28
11	No. 1 Tennessee vs. No. 3 Georgia	85–69
# – Rankings denote tournament seed

== Bracket ==
First round Thu, Feb 25
8	Florida	64
9	Vanderbilt	61
5	Alabama	82
12	South Carolina	71
7	Kentucky	75
10	Ole Miss	59
6	Mississippi State	79
11	Arkansas	70

Quarterfinals; Fri, Feb 26
1	Tennessee	92
8	Florida	80
4	Auburn	72
5	Alabama	76
2	LSU	71
7	Kentucky	81
3	Georgia	72
6	Mississippi State	66

Semifinals; Sat, Feb 27
1	Tennessee	80
5	Alabama	69
7	Kentucky	62
3	Georgia	68

Championship; Sun, Feb 28
1	Tennessee	85
3	Georgia	69
