= Valerie Still =

American basketball player (born 1961)

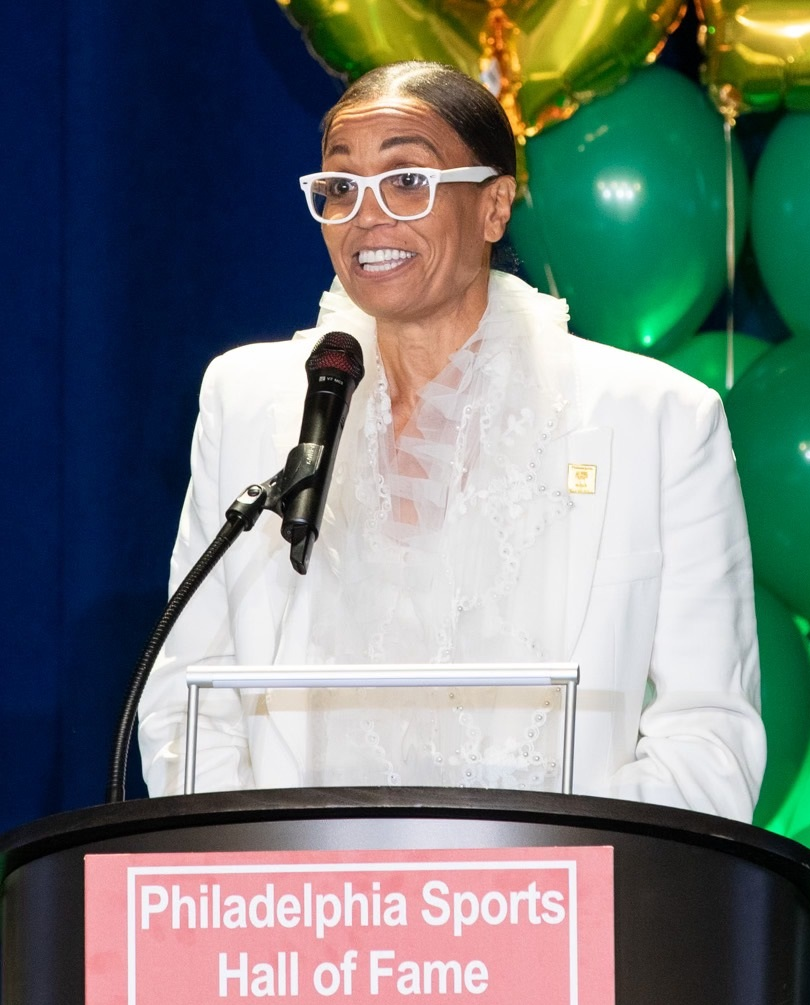

Personal information
- Born: May 14, 1961 (age 65) Camden, New Jersey, U.S.
- Listed height: 6 ft 1 in (1.85 m)
- Listed weight: 155 lb (70 kg)

Career information
- High school: Cherry Hill East (Cherry Hill, New Jersey)
- College: Kentucky (1979-1983)
- Playing career: 1983–1999
- Position: Center
- Number: 12

Career highlights
- SEC Tournament MVP (1982); 2x ABL Champion (1997, 1998); 2x Kodak All-American (1982, 1983)
- Stats at Basketball Reference
- Women's Basketball Hall of Fame
Medals
Women's basketball
Representing United States
Jones Cup
Bronze medal – third place	1980 Taipei	Team competition
Silver medal – second place	1982 Taipei	Team competition
World University Games
Silver medal – second place	1981 Bucharest	Team competition

Valerie Still (born 1961) is an American former professional women's basketball player with the Washington Mystics of the WNBA and the Columbus Quest of the American Basketball League (ABL).

During her four years at the University of Kentucky, she scored more points than any other basketball player, male or female, with 2,763 points. Afterwards she went abroad, playing in Italy for 12 years (last team Famila Schio). During that time, she earned an Italian Professional Basketball Championship.

She returned to the United States in 1996 and was drafted by the Columbus Quest of the fledgling ABL. She led the Quest to back-to-back championships, and was named MVP of the Championship Series both times. When the ABL folded during its third season, she went on to play in the WNBA for the Washington Mystics.

In 1995, she married Rob Lock, also a former University of Kentucky basketball player. They met while Still was interviewing his teammate, Darryl Dawkins, on her television program in Italy. In 1996, they had a child named Aaron Lock. The couple divorced in 2007.

Her brother, Art Still, was a defensive end for the University of Kentucky Wildcats football team from 1973 to 1977 and went on to have a 12-year NFL career for the Kansas City Chiefs and the Buffalo Bills, including 4 pro bowl appearances.

Still lives in Palmyra, New Jersey.

In 2019, Still was inducted into the Women's Basketball Hall of Fame.

== Career statistics ==
Legend
GP	Games played	GS	Games started	MPG	Minutes per game	RPG	Rebounds per game
APG	Assists per game	SPG	Steals per game	BPG	Blocks per game	PPG	Points per game
TO	Turnovers per game	FG%	Field-goal percentage	3P%	3-point field-goal percentage	FT%	Free-throw percentage
**Bold**	Career best	°	League leader

=== WNBA ===
==== Regular season ====
Year	Team	GP	GS	MPG	FG%	3P%	FT%	RPG	APG	SPG	BPG	TO	PPG
1999	Washington	23	6	12.3	24.5	0.0	36.8	1.9	0.3	0.2	0.2	0.9	1.3
Career	1 year, 1 team	23	6	12.3	24.5	0.0	36.8	1.9	0.3	0.2	0.2	0.9	1.3

=== College ===
Legend
GP	Games played	GS	Games started	MPG	Minutes per game
FG%	Field goal percentage	3P%	3-point field goal percentage	FT%	Free throw percentage
RPG	Rebounds per game	APG	Assists per game	SPG	Steals per game
BPG	Blocks per game	PPG	Points per game	**Bold**	Career high

	Team	GP	Points	FG%	FT%	RPG	APG	SPG	BPG	PPG
1979-80	Kentucky	29	641	55.3%	70.0%	13.9	1.1	1.5	1.6	22.1
1980-81	Kentucky	30	628	58.1%	70.1%	11.0	1.2	**2.1**	**1.8**	20.9
1981-82	Kentucky	**32**	**794**	58.2%	68.3%	**14.3**	**1.4**	1.8	1.2	24.8
1982-83	Kentucky	28	700	**59.9%**	**72.6%**	12.0	0.9	1.4	0.6	**25.0**
Career		119	2763	57.8%	70.0%	12.8	1.2	1.7	1.3	23.2

== USA Basketball ==
Still was named to the team representing the US at the 1980 William Jones Cup competition in Taipei, Taiwan. The USA team ended with a 7–2 record, which was a three-way tie for first place. The tie-breaker was point differential, and the USA did not win the tie-breaker, so ended up with the bronze medal.

Still was chosen to represent the USA on the USA Basketball team at the 1981 World University games, held in Bucharest, Romania and coached by Kay Yow. After winning the opening game, the USA was challenged by China, who held a halftime lead. The USA came back to win by two points, helped by 26 points from Denise Curry. The USA also was challenged by Canada, who led at halftime, but the USA won by three points 79–76. The USA beat host team Romania to set up a match with undefeated Russia for the gold medal. The Russian team was too strong, and won the gold, leaving the US with the silver medal. Still averaged 0.7 points per game.

Still also played for the USA team at the Jones Cup competition in 1982. This time, the USA posted a 7–1 record to earn the silver medal.

== Ancestry ==
In the slavery abolitionist movement, Still's family included both activists and individual freedom seekers. Her great-great-great-grandmother, Sidney, escaped from the Maryland Eastern Shore in ca. 1806 to join her husband, a freeman, in New Jersey. She took two daughters with her. She was unsuccessful in her plan to return for her sons, Peter and Levin Jr. The boys, ages 6 and 8, were sold to a brickyard owner and builder in Lexington, KY, the same city where Still lived while on the University of Kentucky basketball team. For 11 years, the brothers carried thousands of bricks where the university is now located.

William Still, the youngest brother of Peter Still and Levin Still Jr., arrived in 1844 from New Jersey to Philadelphia, and became prominent in the Vigilant Committee. Its mission was to provide aid to freedom seekers. William Still kept detailed records of arrivals and used his records to reunite families. Harriet Tubman was among those he worked with and recorded. In his records, he referred to her as “Moses” when she arrived with others, including her parents, who she had guided to freedom from the Maryland Eastern Shore.
