= Georgia Lady Bulldogs basketball =

Georgia Lady Bulldogs
2026–27 Georgia Lady Bulldogs basketball team
- University: University of Georgia
- Head coach: Ayla Guzzardo (1st season)
- Location: Athens, Georgia
- Arena: Stegeman Coliseum (capacity: 10,523)
- Conference: SEC
- Nickname: Lady Bulldogs
- Colors: Red and black

NCAA Division I tournament runner-up
- 1985, 1996
Other NCAA Division I tournament results
Final Four	1983, 1985, 1995, 1996, 1999
Elite Eight	1983, 1984, 1985, 1991, 1995, 1996, 1997, 1999, 2000, 2004, 2013
Sweet Sixteen	1983, 1984, 1985, 1986, 1987, 1988, 1991, 1995, 1996, 1997, 1999, 2000, 2003, 2004, 2005, 2006, 2007, 2010, 2011, 2013
Appearances	1982, 1983, 1984, 1985, 1986, 1987, 1988, 1989, 1990, 1991, 1993, 1995, 1996, 1997, 1998, 1999, 2000, 2001, 2002, 2003, 2004, 2005, 2006, 2007, 2008, 2009, 2010, 2011, 2012, 2013, 2014, 2016, 2018, 2021, 2022, 2023, 2026

Conference tournament champions
- 1983, 1984, 1986, 2001

Conference regular-season champions
- 1983, 1984, 1986, 1991, 1996, 1997, 2000, 2001

Uniforms
Home	Away	Alternate

The Georgia Lady Bulldogs basketball team represents the University of Georgia in basketball. The Lady Bulldogs are a member of the Southeastern Conference (SEC). The "Lady Dawgs," as they are sometimes called, play in Stegeman Coliseum in Athens, Georgia. They have historically been among collegiate Women's Basketball's best programs. Georgia has won seven Southeastern Conference regular-season championships, four conference tournament championships and appeared in the NCAA Division I women's basketball tournament 37 times, tied for 2nd among all schools. The Lady Bulldogs have also appeared in five Final Fours and 11 Elite Eights, but have never won a National Championship.

== History ==
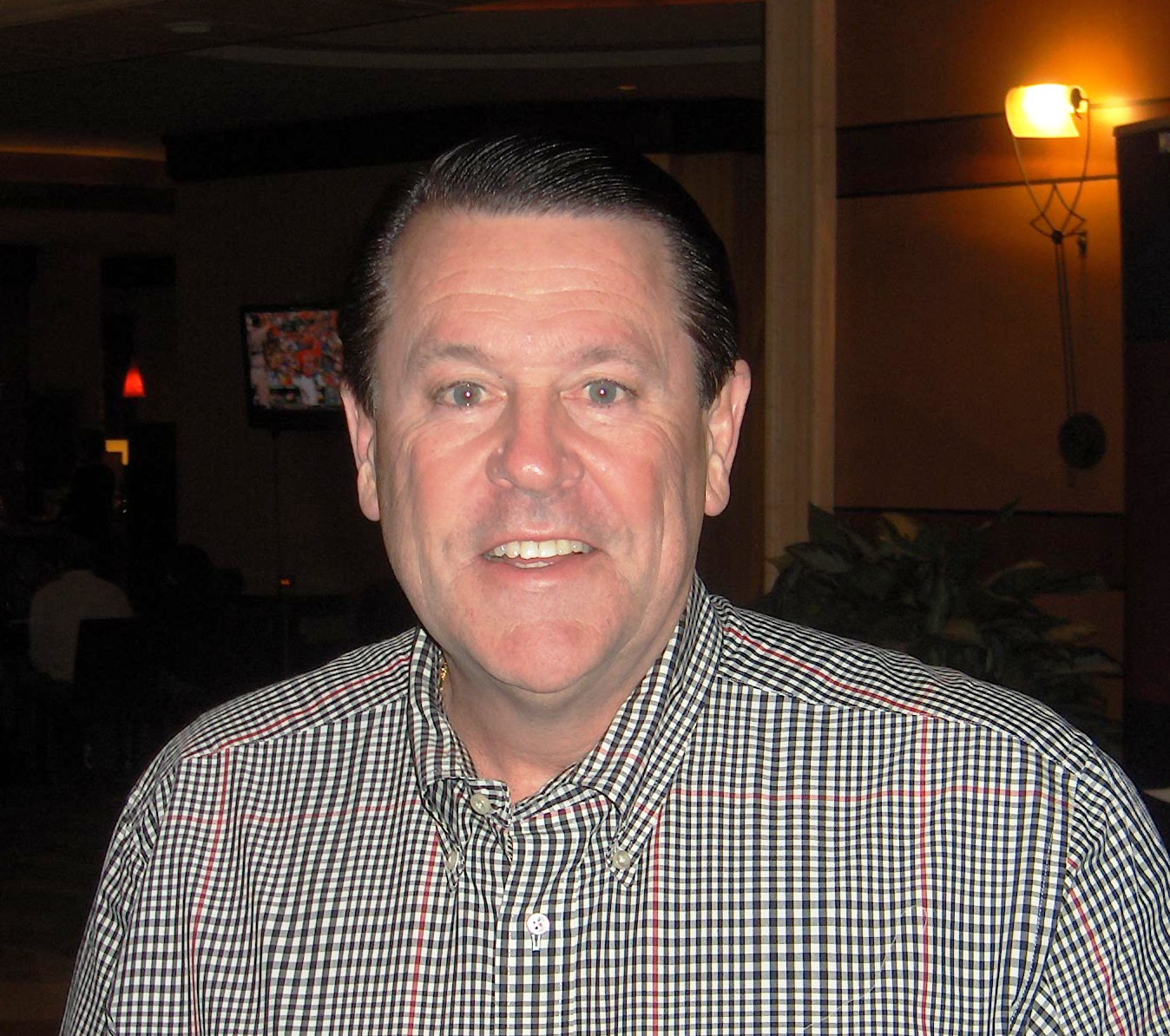
Andy Landers at 2011 WBCA conference

Coach Landers was hired as the team's first full-time coach in 1979. Since the initial NCAA Division I women's basketball tournament in 1982, the Lady Dogs have appeared every year until (and including) 2014 with the exception of 1992 and 1994.

== Year by year results ==
Conference tournament winners noted with # Source

Season	Team	Overall	Conference	Standing	Postseason	Coaches' poll	AP poll
Flossie M. Love (Independent) (1973–1974)
1973–74	Flossie M. Love	3–13	–		GAIAW		
Flossie M. Love:		3–13	–				
Elsa Heimerer (Independent) (1974–1977)
1974–75	Elsa Heimerer	8–9	–		GAIAW		
1975–76	Elsa Heimerer	11–9	–		GAIAW		
1976–77	Elsa Heimerer	2–19	–				
Elsa Heimerer:		21–37	–				
Dave Lucey (Independent) (1977–1978)
1977–78	Dave Lucey	7–16	–		GAIAW		
Dave Lucey:		7–16	–				
Carolyn Lehr (Independent) (1978–1979)
1978–79	Carolyn Lehr	6–19	–				
Carolyn Lehr:		6–19	–				
Andy Landers (Independent, SEC) (1979–2015)
1979–80	Andy Landers	16–12	–		GAIAW		
1980–81	Andy Landers	27–10	–		AIAW Region III, NWIT Champions		
1981–82	Andy Landers	21–9	–		NCAA First Round		
1982–83	Andy Landers	27–7	4–4	3rd (SEC East) #	NCAA Final Four		9
1983–84	Andy Landers	30–3	7–1	T-1st (SEC East) #	NCAA Elite Eight		3
1984–85	Andy Landers	29–5	7–1	1st (SEC East)	NCAA Runner-up		8
1985–86	Andy Landers	30–2	9–0	1st#	NCAA Sweet Sixteen	4	2
1986–87	Andy Landers	27–5	7–2	T-2nd	NCAA Sweet Sixteen	9	6
1987–88	Andy Landers	21–10	5–4	T-4th	NCAA Sweet Sixteen	10	17
1988–89	Andy Landers	23–7	6–3	3rd	NCAA Second Round (Play-in)	18	10
1989–90	Andy Landers	25–5	6–3	4th	NCAA Second Round (Bye)	13	7
1990–91	Andy Landers	28–4	9–0	1st	NCAA Elite Eight	6	3
1991–92	Andy Landers	19–11	6–5	T-4th			
1992–93	Andy Landers	21–13	4–7	T-8th	NCAA Second Round (Play-in)	21	21
1993–94	Andy Landers	17–11	5–6	T-7th			
1994–95	Andy Landers	28–5	8–3	T-2nd	NCAA Final Four	4	12
1995–96	Andy Landers	28–5	10–1	1st	NCAA Runner-up	2	5
1996–97	Andy Landers	25–6	11–1	1st	NCAA Elite Eight	7	6
1997–98	Andy Landers	17–11	8–6	5th	NCAA First Round		
1998–99	Andy Landers	27–7	9–5	3rd	NCAA Final Four	12	12
1999–2000	Andy Landers	32–4	13–1	T-1st	NCAA Elite Eight	5	4
2000–01	Andy Landers	27–6	11–3	T-2nd#	NCAA Second Round	13	4
2001–02	Andy Landers	19–11	6–8	9th	NCAA First Round		
2002–03	Andy Landers	21–10	10–4	T-3rd	NCAA Sweet Sixteen	11	19
2003–04	Andy Landers	25–10	8–6	T-4th	NCAA Elite Eight	8	16
2004–05	Andy Landers	24–10	9–5	4th	NCAA Sweet Sixteen	13	20
2005–06	Andy Landers	23–9	10–4	3rd	NCAA Sweet Sixteen	13	12
2006–07	Andy Landers	27–7	11–3	2nd	NCAA Sweet Sixteen	13	13
2007–08	Andy Landers	23–10	8–6	T-4th	NCAA Second Round	24	
2008–09	Andy Landers	18–14	7–7	7th	NCAA First Round		
2009–10	Andy Landers	25–9	9–7	T-3rd	NCAA Sweet Sixteen	19	23
2010–11	Andy Landers	23–11	10–6	T-3rd	NCAA Sweet Sixteen	24	
2011–12	Andy Landers	22–9	11–5	3rd	NCAA First Round	20	20
2012–13	Andy Landers	28–7	12–4	3rd	NCAA Elite Eight	13	14
2013–14	Andy Landers	20–12	7–9	9th	NCAA First Round		
2014–15	Andy Landers	19–12	6–10	9th			
Andy Landers:		862–299	273–144				
Joni Taylor (SEC) (2015–2022)
2015–16	Joni Taylor	21–9	9–7	6th	NCAA First Round		
2016–17	Joni Taylor	16–15	7–9	T-8th			
2017–18	Joni Taylor	26–7	12–4	T-2nd	NCAA Second Round	18	19
2018–19	Joni Taylor	18–12	9–7	T-6th			
2019–20	Joni Taylor	17–14	7–9	9th			
2020–21	Joni Taylor	21–7	10–5	4th	NCAA Second Round		
2021–22	Joni Taylor	20-8	9-7	6th	NCAA Second Round	15	12
Joni Taylor:		139–72 (.659)	63–48 (.568)				
Katie Abrahamson-Henderson (SEC) (2022–2026)
2022–23	Katie Abrahamson-Henderson	22–12	9–7	T-5th	NCAA Second Round		
2023–24	Katie Abrahamson-Henderson	12–18	3–13	13th			
2024–25	Katie Abrahamson-Henderson	13–19	4–12	12th			
2025–26	Katie Abrahamson-Henderson	22–10	8–8	8th	NCAA First Round		
Katie Abrahamson-Henderson:		69–59 (.539)	24–40 (.375)				
Ayla Guzzardo (SEC) (2026–present)
Total:		1103–514 (.682)					
National champion Postseason invitational champion Conference regular season champion Conference regular season and conference tournament champion Division regular season champion Division regular season and conference tournament champion Conference tournament champion

== NCAA tournament results ==
The Bulldogs have made the NCAA tournament 37 times. They have a combined record of 59−37.

Year	Seed	Round	Opponent	Result
1982	#5	First Round	#4 Arizona State	L 77−97
1983	#2	First Round; Sweet Sixteen; Elite Eight; Final Four	#7 North Carolina #6 Indiana #1 Tennessee #1 USC	W 72−70; W 86−70; W 67–63; L 57–81
1984	#1	First Round; Sweet Sixteen; Elite Eight	#8 Louisville #4 Ole Miss #3 Tennessee	W 112−69; W 73−63; L 61–73
1985	#2	First Round; Sweet Sixteen; Elite Eight; Final Four; National Championship	#7 Tennessee Tech #6 UCLA #1 Long Beach State #4 Western Kentucky #1 Old Dominion	W 91−74; W 78−42; W 97–82; W 91–78; L 65–70
1986	#1	Second Round; Sweet Sixteen	#8 Illinois #4 Tennessee	W 103−64; L 82−85
1987	#2	Second Round; Sweet Sixteen	#7 Kansas #3 Iowa	W 82−51; L 60−62
1988	#4	Second Round; Sweet Sixteen	#5 Western Kentucky #1 Auburn	W 84−66; L 65−68
1989	#5	First Round; Second Round	#12 Chattanooga #4 Clemson	W 90−69; L 65–78
1990	#2	Second Round	#7 Arkansas	L 70−81
1991	#1	Second Round; Sweet Sixteen; Elite Eight	#8 UNLV #4 Long Beach State #2 Stanford	W 86−62; W 87−77; L 67–75
1993	#8	First Round; Second Round	#9 San Diego State #1 Stanford	W 85−68; L 60−93
1995	#3	First Round; Second Round; Sweet Sixteen; Elite Eight; Final Four	#14 Indiana #11 Louisville #7 NC State #1 Colorado #1 Tennessee	W 81−64; W 81−68; W 98–79; W 82–79; L 51–73
1996	#2	First Round; Second Round; Sweet Sixteen; Elite Eight; Final Four; National Championship	#15 St. Francis (PA) #7 Oklahoma State #11 Stephen F. Austin #1 Louisiana Tech #1 Stanford #1 Tennessee	W 98−66; W 83−55; W 78–64; W 90–76; W 86–76; L 65–83
1997	#2	First Round; Second Round; Sweet Sixteen; Elite Eight	#15 Eastern Kentucky #7 Arizona #6 Vanderbilt #1 Stanford	W 91−55; W 80−74; W 66–52; L 47–82
1998	#7	First Round	#10 George Washington	L 72−74
1999	#3	First Round; Second Round; Sweet Sixteen; Elite Eight; Final Four	#14 Liberty #11 SMU #2 Clemson #4 Iowa State #3 Duke	W 73−52; W 68−55; W 67–54; W 89–71; L 69–81
2000	#1	First Round; Second Round; Sweet Sixteen; Elite Eight	#16 Montana #9 Stanford #5 North Carolina #2 Rutgers	W 74−46; W 83−64; W 83–57; L 51–59
2001	#2	First Round; Second Round	#15 Liberty #10 Missouri	W 77−48; L 65–78
2002	#10	First Round	#7 Old Dominion	L 54−68
2003	#5	First Round; Second Round; Sweet Sixteen	#12 Charlotte #4 Rutgers #1 Duke	W 80−61; W 74−64; L 63–66
2004	#3	First Round; Second Round; Sweet Sixteen; Elite Eight	#14 Liberty #6 TCU #2 Purdue #4 LSU	W 78−53; W 85−71; W 66–64; L 60–62
2005	#6	First Round; Second Round; Sweet Sixteen	#11 Rice #3 Texas #2 Duke	W 75−49; W 70−68; L 57–63
2006	#3	First Round; Second Round; Sweet Sixteen	#14 Marist #11 Hartford #2 Connecticut	W 75−60; W 73−54; L 75–77
2007	#3	First Round; Second Round; Sweet Sixteen	#14 Belmont #6 Iowa State #2 Purdue	W 53−36; W 76−56; L 65–78
2008	#8	First Round; Second Round	#9 Iowa #1 North Carolina	W 67−61; L 66−80
2009	#11	First Round	#6 Arizona State	L 47−58
2010	#5	First Round; Second Round; Sweet Sixteen	#12 Tulane #4 Oklahoma State #1 Stanford	W 64−59; W 74−71 (OT); L 36–73
2011	#6	First Round; Second Round; Sweet Sixteen	#11 Middle Tenn #6 Florida State #2 Texas A&M	W 56−41; W 61−59; L 38–79
2012	#4	First Round	#13 Marist	L 70−76
2013	#4	First Round; Second Round; Sweet Sixteen; Elite Eight	#13 Montana #5 Iowa State #1 Stanford #2 California	W 70−50; W 65−60; W 61–59; L 62–65 (OT)
2014	#8	First Round	#9 St. Joseph's	L 57−67
2016	#8	First Round	#9 Indiana	L 58−62
2018	#4	First Round; Second Round	#13 Mercer #5 Duke	W 68−63; L 40−66
2021	#3	First Round; Second Round	#14 Drexel #6 Oregon	W 67−53; L 50−57
2022	#6	First Round; Second Round	#11 Dayton #3 Iowa State	W 70−54; L 44−67
2023	#10	First Round; Second Round	#7 Florida State #2 Iowa	W 66−54; L 66−74
2026	#7	First Round	#10 Virginia	L 73–82 (OT)

== Home venues ==
- Stegeman Coliseum

== Player awards ==
=== National awards ===
- USBWA National Freshman of the Year

Tasha Humphrey – 2005

- Naismith College Player of the Year

Saudia Roundtree – 1996

=== SEC Awards ===
- Player of the Year Award

Katrina McClain – 1987
Saudia Roundtree – 1996
Kelly Miller – 2000, 2001

== School records ==
=== Career leaders ===
- Points Scored: Janet Harris (2641)
- Rebounds: Janet Harris (1398)
- Assists: Teresa Edwards (63)
- Steals: Sherill Baker (426)
- 3-pointers: Cori Chambers (282)

=== Single-season leaders ===
- Points Scored: Katrina McClain(796, 1987)
- Rebounds: Janet Harris, (397, 1983)
- Assists: Saudia Roundtree (226, 1995)
- Steals: Sherill Baker (149, 2006)
- 3-pointers: Cori Chambers (85, 2007)

=== Single-game leaders ===
- Points Scored: Coco Miller (45, 6 Dec 1997)
- Rebounds: Katrina McClain (24, 10 Feb 1986)
- Assists: Lady Hardmon 14, (6 Jan 1992)
- Steals: Ashley Houts (10, 29 Nov 2006)

=== Triple-Doubles ===
- Teresa Edwards 24 points, 10 rebs. & 10 assists. vs. Alabama 1 Mar 1986
- Tracy Henderson 14 points, 13 rebs. & 10 blocks vs. Louisville 19 Mar 1995

== See also ==
- Uga (mascot)
