= Auburn Tigers women's basketball =

2026–27 Auburn Tigers women's basketball team
- University: Auburn University
- First season: 1972
- Athletic director: John Cohen
- Head coach: Larry Vickers (2nd season)
- Location: Auburn, Alabama
- Arena: Neville Arena (capacity: 9,121)
- Conference: Southeastern Conference
- Nickname: Tigers
- Colors: Burnt orange and navy blue
- All-time record: 946–497 (.656)

NCAA Division I tournament runner-up
- 1988, 1989, 1990
Other NCAA Division I tournament results
Final Four	1988, 1989, 1990
Elite Eight	1987, 1988, 1989, 1990, 1991, 1996
Sweet Sixteen	1986, 1987, 1988, 1989, 1990, 1991, 1996
Appearances	1982, 1983, 1985, 1986, 1987, 1988, 1989, 1990, 1991, 1993, 1994, 1996, 1997, 1999, 2000, 2004, 2008, 2009, 2016, 2017, 2019, 2024

Conference tournament champions
- 1981, 1987, 1990, 1997

Conference regular-season champions
- 1981, 1987, 1988, 1989, 2009

Uniforms
Home	Away	Alternate

The Auburn Tigers women's basketball program is the intercollegiate women's basketball team that represents Auburn University. The school competes in the Southeastern Conference in Division I of the National Collegiate Athletic Association (NCAA). The Tigers play their homes games at Auburn Arena in Auburn, Alabama on the university campus. The program began in 1971.

Auburn has won five SEC regular season championships and four SEC tournament championships. Auburn has appeared in the NCAA tournament 21 times, making it as far as the championship game three times in a row in 1988, 1989, and 1990. Auburn has produced eight WNBA draft picks, including DeWanna Bonner who was selected with the fifth overall pick, the highest in Auburn history. Eight Auburn players have been named All-Americans and Auburn has had 73 All-SEC selections. Four Auburn players have been named SEC Player of the Year: Vickie Orr in 1988, Carolyn Jones in 1990 and 1991, Lauretta Freeman in 1993, and DeWanna Bonner in 2009. Former head coaches Joe Ciampi and Nell Fortner have been selected as SEC Coach of the Year a total of four times.

== History ==
The Auburn women's basketball team has been consistently competitive both nationally and within the SEC. Despite playing in the same conference as perennial powerhouse Tennessee and other competitive programs such as LSU, Georgia, Kentucky and Vanderbilt, and more recently, South Carolina, Mississippi State and Texas A&M, Auburn has won five regular season SEC championships and four SEC tournament championships. Auburn has made 21 appearances in the NCAA women's basketball tournament, advancing to the Sweet 16 seven times and the Elite Eight six times. Auburn played in three consecutive National Championship games in 1988, 1989 and 1990, and won the Women's NIT in 2003.

When Coach Joe Ciampi announced his retirement after 25 years at the end of the 2003–2004 season, the resulting search snared the highly experienced, former Purdue and US National and Olympic team head coach, Nell Fortner. Fortner coached the team through the 2011–2012 season, including a 2009 SEC regular-season championship and a 30–4 record. The Tigers made two NCAA Tournament appearances in Fortner's eight-year tenure.

Fortner was replaced in 2012 by Terri Williams-Flournoy who had been the head coach at Georgetown University for eight seasons. Williams-Flournoy directed the Tigers to three NCAA Tournament appearances, a pair of 20-win seasons and two trips to the WNIT in her nine seasons.

Williams-Flournoy was relieved of her coaching duties following the 2020–21 season. On April 3, 2021, Johnnie Harris was named the program's seventh head coach.

Standout former Auburn players include: Mae Ola Bolton, Ruthie Bolton, Vickie Orr, Carolyn Jones, Chantel Tremitiere, Lauretta Freeman, Le'coe Willingham, DeWanna Bonner, Monique Morehouse, Blanche Alverson, Tyrese Tanner and Unique Thompson.

== Players ==
=== Awards and honors ===
==== Retired jerseys ====
No.	Player	Years
21	Carolyn Jones	1988–91
24	DeWanna Bonner	2005–09
25	Ruthie Bolton	1985–89
34	Becky Jackson	1980–84
50	Vickie Orr	1985–89

==== All-Americans ====
Player	Year(s)	Selectors
Marianne Merritt	1979	HM, NSA
Becky Jackson (3)	1981, 1983, 1984	AWSF, WBCA
Martha Monk	1981	AWSF
Vickie Orr (3)	1987, 1988, 1989	WBCA, USBWA
Carolyn Jones (2)	1990, 1991	WBCA
Lauretta Freeman	1993	WBCA
DeWanna Bonner (2)	2008, 2009	HM, AP, WBCA, USBWA
Whitney Boddie	2009	HM, AP, USBWA
Unique Thompson	2020, 2021	HM, AP, USBWA

==== Other honors ====
SEC Player of the Year

- Vickie Orr (1988)
- Carolyn Jones (1990, 1991)
- Lauretta Freeman (1993)
- DeWanna Bonner (2009)

SEC Tournament MVP

- Becky Jackson (1981)
- Vickie Orr (1987)
- Carolyn Jones (1990)
- Laticia Morris (1997)

SEC Freshman of the Year

- Mae Ola Bolton (1985)
- Kristen Mulligan (1993)

SEC Scholar-Athlete of the Year

- Blanche Alverson (2012, 2013)
- Katie Frerking (2017)

=== Auburn in the WNBA ===
==== WNBA Draft picks ====
Auburn has produced eight WNBA draft picks, including three in the inaugural 1997 draft. DeWanna Bonner holds the record for the highest draft pick from Auburn, selected 5th overall in the 2009 draft.

Year	Round	Pick	Player	Team
1997	Assigned by league		Ruthie Bolton-Holifield	Sacramento Monarchs
1997	3	18	Chantel Tremitiere	Sacramento Monarchs
1997	Developmental player		Tara Williams	Phoenix Mercury
1999	4	42	Carolyn Jones-Young	New York Liberty
2000	3	33	Monique Morehouse	Cleveland Rockers
2006	3	42	Marita Payne	Connecticut Sun
2009	1	5	DeWanna Bonner	Phoenix Mercury
2009	2	20	Whitney Boddie	Sacramento Monarchs
2021	2	19	Unique Thompson	Indiana Fever

==== Undrafted free agents ====
In addition to its eight WNBA draft picks, Auburn has had two undrafted free agents that went on to have WNBA careers.

- Mandisa Stevenson (2004–2007)
- Le'coe Willingham (2004–2013)

==== Awards and honors ====
Sixth Woman of the Year

- DeWanna Bonner (2009, 2010, 2011)

All-Stars

- Ruthie Bolton (1999, 2001)
- DeWanna Bonner (2015, 2018, 2019, 2021, 2023)

=== Auburn in the Olympics ===
Year	Player	Medal
1992	Carolyn Jones (USA)	Bronze
1992	Vickie Orr (USA)	Bronze
1996	Ruthie Bolton-Holifield (USA)	Gold
2000	Ruthie Bolton-Holifield (USA)	Gold

== Championships and postseason ==
=== SEC regular season championships ===
Auburn has won five regular season Southeastern Conference championships in its history.

Year	Conference	Overall record	Conference record	Coach
1981	SEC	26–7	5–2	Joe Ciampi
1987	SEC	31–2	8–1	Joe Ciampi
1988	SEC	32–3	9–0	Joe Ciampi
1989	SEC	32–2	9–0	Joe Ciampi
2009	SEC	30–4	12–2	Nell Fortner

=== SEC Tournament ===
Auburn has won the SEC tournament four times, all under Joe Ciampi. Auburn defeated rival Alabama in the 1981 tournament 85–71 to win their first ever SEC Tournament title in the second edition of the tournament. Six years later in 1987, Auburn routed Georgia by a score of 83–57 to win their second championship. After losing in the championship game to Tennessee twice in a row in the following years, Auburn defeated Tennessee in the 1990 championship game 78–77. Auburn won its most recent SEC Tournament championship in 1997, defeating Florida 52–47. Auburn has reached the SEC Tournament final four other times, falling to Tennessee in 1985, 1988, and 1989 and falling to Vanderbilt in 2009.

Four Auburn players have been selected as SEC Tournament MVP: Becky Jackson in 1981, Vickie Orr in 1987, Carolyn Jones in 1990, and Laticia Morris in 1997. Auburn has had 22 players selected to the SEC All-Tournament teams, including most recently DeWanna Bonner and Whitney Boddie in 2009.

== Season-by-season record ==
Season	Coach	Record	Conference record	Postseason finish
1971–72	Aletha Bond	10–2	–	
1972–73	Aletha Bond	14–3	–	
1973–74	Susan Nunnelly	13–5	–	
1974–75	Susan Nunnelly	13–8	–	
1975–76	Susan Nunnelly	19–8	–	
1976–77	Jan Pylant	12–8	–	
1977–78	Jan Pylant	8–18	–	
1978–79	Jan Pylant	9–18	–	
1979–80	Joe Ciampi	17–13	–	
1980–81	Joe Ciampi	26–7	–	
1981–82	Joe Ciampi	24–5	–	NCAA Tournament
1982–83	Joe Ciampi	24–8	6–2 (T-2nd)	NCAA Tournament
1983–84	Joe Ciampi	19–10	4–4 (6th)	
1984–85	Joe Ciampi	25–6	5–3 (3rd)	NCAA Tournament
1985–86	Joe Ciampi	24–6	6–3 (T-2nd)	NCAA Sweet Sixteen
1986–87	Joe Ciampi	31–2	8–1 (1st)	NCAA Elite Eight
1987–88	Joe Ciampi	32–3	9–0 (1st)	NCAA Runner-Up
1988–89	Joe Ciampi	32–2	9–0 (1st)	NCAA Runner-Up
1989–90	Joe Ciampi	28–7	7–2 (2nd)	NCAA Runner-Up
1990–91	Joe Ciampi	26–6	7–2 (2nd)	NCAA Elite Eight
1991–92	Joe Ciampi	17–12	4–7 (T-7th)	
1992–93	Joe Ciampi	25–4	9–2 (T-2nd)	NCAA Sweet Sixteen
1993–94	Joe Ciampi	20–10	6–5 (6th)	NCAA Second Round
1994–95	Joe Ciampi	17–10	5–6 (8th)	
1995–96	Joe Ciampi	23–9	6–5 (T-5th)	NCAA Elite Eight
1996–97	Joe Ciampi	22–10	5–7 (T-8th)	NCAA second round
1997–98	Joe Ciampi	16–11	4–10 (T-9th)	
1998–99	Joe Ciampi	20–9	8–6 (4th)	NCAA second round
1999-00	Joe Ciampi	22–8	9–5 (4th)	NCAA second round
2000–01	Joe Ciampi	17–12	5–9 (T-8th)	
2001–02	Joe Ciampi	16–13	3–11 (T-10th)	
2002–03	Joe Ciampi	23–11	5–9 (8th)	WNIT Champions
2003–04	Joe Ciampi	22–9	9–5 (3rd)	NCAA second round
2004–05	Nell Fortner	16–13	6–8 (T-6th)	
2005–06	Nell Fortner	14–15	4–10 (10th)	
2006–07	Nell Fortner	21–13	6–8 (9th)	WNIT Semifinals
2007–08	Nell Fortner	20–12	7–7 (6th)	NCAA first round
2008–09	Nell Fortner	30–4	12–2 (1st)	NCAA second round
2009–10	Nell Fortner	15–16	5–11 (10th)	
2010–11	Nell Fortner	16–16	8–8 (T-5th)	WNIT Second Round
2011–12	Nell Fortner	13–17	5–11 (9th)	
2012–13	Terri Williams-Flournoy	19–15	5–11 (10th)	WNIT Quarterfinals
2013–14	Terri Williams-Flournoy	19–15	7–9 (T-6th)	WNIT Third Round
2014–15	Terri Williams-Flournoy	13–18	3–13 (13th)	
2015–16	Terri Williams-Flournoy	20–13	8–8 (T-7th)	NCAA Second Round
2016–17	Terri Williams-Flournoy	17–15	7–9 (T-8th)	NCAA First Round
2017–18	Terri Williams-Flournoy	14–15	5–11 (10th)	
2018–19	Terri Williams-Flournoy	22–10	9–7 (T-6th)	NCAA First Round
2019–20	Terri Williams-Flournoy	11–18	4–12 (T-12th)	
2020–21	Terri Williams-Flournoy	5–19	0–15 (13th)	
2021–22	Johnnie Harris	10–18	2–14 (14th)	
2022–23	Johnnie Harris	16–15	5–11 (T-10th)	WNIT Second Round
2023–24	Johnnie Harris	22–12	8–8 (T-7th)	NCAA First Four
2024–25	Johnnie Harris	12–18	3–13 (T-13th)	
2025–26	Larry Vickers	15–17	3–13 (15th)	

== NCAA tournament results ==
Auburn has appeared in the NCAA Division I women's basketball tournament 22 times. The Tigers have a record of 30–22.

Year	Seed	Round	Opponent	Result
1982	#2	First Round	#7 Cheyney	L 64–75
1983	#5	First Round; Sweet Sixteen	#4 Missouri #1 Louisiana Tech	W 94–76; L 54–81
1985	#3	First Round; Sweet Sixteen	#6 Memphis State #2 NE Louisiana	W 82–64; L 71–76
1986	#3	Second Round; Sweet Sixteen	#6 Southern Illinois #2 Ole Miss	W 61–39; L 55–56
1987	#1	Second Round; Sweet Sixteen; Elite Eight	#8 Illinois #5 Old Dominion #2 Tennessee	W 92–58; W 77–61; L 61–77
1988	#1	Second Round; Sweet Sixteen; Elite Eight; Final Four; Title Game	#8 Temple #4 Clemson #3 Ole Miss #2 Long Beach State #2 Louisiana Tech	W 94–66; W 68–65; W 103–74; W 68–55; L 54–56
1989	#1	Second Round; Sweet Sixteen; Elite Eight; Final Four; Title Game	#9 Penn State #4 Georgia #2 Maryland #1 Louisiana Tech #1 Tennessee	W 88–54; W 71–60; W 77–51; W 76–71; L 60–76
1990	#2	Second Round; Sweet Sixteen; Elite Eight; Final Four; Title Game	#7 Tennessee Tech #6 Vanderbilt #1 Washington #1 Louisiana Tech #1 Stanford	W 73–54; W 89–67; W 76–50; W 81–69; L 81–88
1991	#3	Second Round; Sweet Sixteen; Elite Eight	#11 Holy Cross #10 Vanderbilt #1 Tennessee	W 84–58; W 58–45; L 65–69
1993	#3	Second Round; Sweet Sixteen	#11 Louisville #2 Iowa	W 66–61; L 50–63
1994	#9	First Round; Second Round	#8 Virginia Tech #1 Connecticut	W 60–51; L 59–81
1996	#6	First Round; Second Round; Sweet Sixteen; Elite Eight	#11 Hawaii #3 Colorado #2 Penn State #1 Stanford	W 73–53; W 68–61; W 75–69; L 57–71
1997	#7	First Round; Second Round	#10 Louisville #2 Louisiana Tech	W 68–65; L 48–74
1999	#5	First Round; Second Round	#12 Texas #4 Virginia Tech	W 69–61; L 61–76
2000	#7	First Round; Second Round	#10 SW Missouri State #2 Penn State	W 78–74; L 69–75
2004	#7	First Round; Second Round	#10 NC State #2 Connecticut	W 79–59; L 53–79
2008	#11	First Round	#6 George Washington	L 56–66
2009	#2	First Round; Second Round	#15 Lehigh #7 Rutgers	W 85–49; L 52–80
2016	#9	First Round; Second Round	#8 St. John's #1 Baylor	W 68–57; L 52–84
2017	#11	First Round	#6 NC State	L 48–62
2019	#10	First Round	#7 BYU	L 64–73
2024	#11	First Four	#11 Arizona	L 59–69

== WNIT ==
The Tigers have participated in six WNIT tournaments, with an overall record of 13 – 5, including the 2003 WNIT championship.

Year	Round	Opponent	Result
2003	First	S. Alabama	W 77–53
2003	Second	Florida State	W 68–57
2003	Quarterfinals	Richmond	W 59–53
2003	Semifinals	Creighton	W 73–62
2003	Championship	Baylor	W 64–63
2007	Round 2	UAB	W 74–60
2007	Round 3	Virginia Tech	W 81–73
2007	Quarterfinals	Kansas State	L 67–54
2011	First	Tennessee Tech	W 68–54
2011	Second	Toledo	L 67–52
2013	First	UAB	W 80–57
2013	Second	WKU	W 84–66
2013	Third	Tulane	W 72–52
2013	Fourth	Drexel	L 56–43
2014	Round 1	Furman	W 78–64
2014	Round 2	Old Dominion	W 82–59
2014	Round 3	Mississippi State	L 59–54
2023	Round 1	Tulane	W 73–58
2023	Round 2	Clemson	L 56–55
