= 2003 Big 12 Conference women's basketball tournament =

- Classification: Division I
- Teams: 12
- Site: Reunion Arena; Dallas, Texas
- Champions: Texas (1st title)
- Winning coach: Jody Conradt (1st title)
- MVP: Stacy Stephens (Texas)
- Attendance: 35,619 (overall); 10,717 (championship)
- Television: FSN

2002–03 Big 12 Conference women's basketball standings
	Conf.				Overall
Team	W		L	PCT	W		L	PCT
No. 5 Texas †	15	–	1	.938	29	–	6	.829
No. 8 Kansas State	14	–	2	.875	29	–	5	.853
No. 7 Texas Tech	13	–	3	.813	29	–	6	.829
Colorado	11	–	5	.688	24	–	8	.750
Oklahoma	9	–	7	.563	19	–	13	.594
Missouri	9	–	7	.563	17	–	14	.548
Baylor	8	–	8	.500	24	–	11	.686
Iowa State	7	–	9	.438	12	–	16	.429
Kansas	3	–	13	.188	11	–	18	.379
Texas A&M	3	–	13	.188	10	–	18	.357
Oklahoma State	3	–	13	.188	8	–	21	.276
Nebraska	1	–	15	.063	8	–	20	.286
† 2003 Big 12 Tournament winner Rankings from AP poll

The 2003 Big 12 Conference women's basketball tournament was held March 11–15, 2003, at Reunion Arena in Dallas, Texas.

Number 1 seed Texas defeated number 3 seed Texas Tech 67–57 to win their first championship and receive the conference's automatic bid to the 2003 NCAA tournament.

== Seeding ==
The Tournament consisted of a 12 team single-elimination tournament with the top 4 seeds receiving a bye.

2003 Big 12 Conference women's basketball tournament seeds
Seed	School	Conf.	Over.	Tiebreaker
1	Texas ‡#	15–1	29–6	
2	Kansas State #	14–2	29–5	
3	Texas Tech #	13–3	29–6	
4	Colorado #	11–5	24–8	
5	Oklahoma	9–7	19–13	
6	Missouri	9–7	17–14	
7	Baylor	8–8	24–11	
8	Iowa State	7–9	12–16	
9	Kansas	3–13	11–18	
10	Texas A&M	3–13	10–18	
11	Oklahoma State	3–13	8–21	
12	Nebraska	1–15	8–20	
‡ – Big 12 Conference regular season champions, and tournament No. 1 seed. # – Received a single-bye in the conference tournament. Overall records include all games played in the Big 12 Conference tournament.

== Schedule ==
Session	Game	Time	Matchup	Television	Attendance
First round – Tuesday, March 11
1	1	12:00 pm	#9 Kansas 63 vs #8 Iowa State 60		3,061
1	2	2:30 pm	#5 Oklahoma 71 vs #12 Nebraska 51		3,061
2	3	6:00 pm	#7 Baylor 80 vs #10 Texas A&M 61		3,045
2	4	8:30 pm	#11 Oklahoma State 56 vs #6 Missouri 54		3,045
Quarterfinals – Wednesday, March 12
3	5	12:00 pm	#1 Texas 87 vs #9 Kansas 56	FSN	6,405
3	6	2:30 pm	#4 Colorado 73 vs #5 Oklahoma 68	FSN	6,405
4	7	6:00 pm	#2 Kansas State 77 vs #7 Baylor 60	FSN	5,735
4	8	8:30 pm	#3 Texas Tech 75 vs #11 Oklahoma State 52	FSN	5,735
Semifinals – Thursday, March 13
5	9	6:00 pm	#1 Texas 62 vs #4 Colorado 47	FSN	6,656
5	10	8:30 pm	#3 Texas Tech 71 vs #2 Kansas State 65	FSN	6,656
Final – Saturday, March 15
6	11	6:00 pm	#1 Texas 67 vs #3 Texas Tech 57	FSN	10,717
Game times in CT. #-Rankings denote tournament seed

== Tournament ==
First round Tuesday, March 11
8	Iowa State	60
9	Kansas	63
5	Oklahoma	71
12	Nebraska	51
6	Missouri	54
11	Oklahoma State	56
7	Baylor	80
10	Texas A&M	61

Quarterfinals; Wednesday, March 12
1	Texas	87
9	Kansas	56
4	Colorado	73
5	Oklahoma	68
3	Texas Tech	75
11	Oklahoma State	52
2	Kansas State	77
7	Baylor	60

Semifinals; Thursday, March 13
1	Texas	62
4	Colorado	47
3	Texas Tech	71
2	Kansas State	65

Finals; Saturday, March 15
1	Texas	67
3	Texas Tech	57

== All-Tournament team ==
Most Outstanding Player – Stacy Stephens, Texas

Player	Team
Stacy Stephens	Texas
Heather Schreiber	Texas
Plenette Pierson	Texas Tech
Jia Perkins	Texas Tech
Tera Bjorklund	Colorado

== See also ==
- 2003 Big 12 Conference men's basketball tournament
- 2003 NCAA Division I women's basketball tournament
- 2002–03 NCAA Division I women's basketball rankings
