= 2002–03 Clemson Tigers women's basketball team =

Women's college basketball season

2002–03 Clemson Tigers women's basketball
- Conference: Atlantic Coast Conference
- Record: 14–15 (5–11 ACC)
- Head coach: Jim Davis (16th season)
- Home arena: Civic Center of Anderson (7 games); Littlejohn Coliseum (7 games)

The 2002–03 Clemson Tigers women's basketball team represented Clemson University during the 2002–03 NCAA Division I women's basketball season. The Tigers were led by sixteenth year head coach Jim Davis. The Tigers, members of the Atlantic Coast Conference, played their first 7 home games at the Civic Center of Anderson in nearby Anderson, South Carolina, before renovations were completed on Littlejohn Coliseum.

== Schedule ==
Date time, TV	Rank^{#}	Opponent^{#}	Result	Record	Site city, state
November 22, 2002*		at South Carolina rivalry	L 58–72	0–1	Carolina Center; Columbia, South Carolina
November 26, 2002*		Grambling	W 77–52	1–1	Civic Center of Anderson; Anderson, South Carolina
November 29, 2002*		at Western Kentucky	W 69–62	2–1	E. A. Diddle Arena; Bowling Green, Kentucky
December 5, 2002*		Winthrop	W 90–52	3–1	Civic Center of Anderson; Anderson, South Carolina
December 7, 2002*		No. 11 Penn State	L 66–80	3–2	Civic Center of Anderson; Anderson, South Carolina
December 14, 2002*		Furman	W 91–58	4–2	Civic Center of Anderson; Anderson, South Carolina
December 17, 2002*		High Point	W 84–56	5–2	Civic Center of Anderson; Anderson, South Carolina
December 21, 2002*		vs. Marshall; Bahamas Sun Splash Shootout	W 45–37 ^{OT}	6–2	Kendal Isaacs National Gymnasium; Nassau, Bahamas
December 22, 2002*		vs. Oakland; Bahamas Sun Splash Shootout	W 70–67	7–2	Kendal Isaacs National Gymnasium; Nassau, Bahamas
December 27, 2002*		vs. Auburn; Russell Athletic Shootout	L 58–60	7–3	Philips Arena; Atlanta, Georgia
December 30, 2002*		at Miami (OH)	W 55–50	8–3	Millett Hall; Oxford, Ohio
January 2, 2003		Virginia	W 63–62	9–3 (1–0)	Civic Center of Anderson; Anderson, South Carolina
January 6, 2003		at No. 1 Duke	L 53–69	9–4 (1–1)	Cameron Indoor Stadium; Durham, North Carolina
January 9, 2003		at Maryland	W 70–59	10–4 (2–1)	Comcast Center; College Park, Maryland
January 16, 2003		No. 8 North Carolina	L 55–77	10–5 (2–2)	Littlejohn Coliseum; Clemson, South Carolina
January 20, 2003		at NC State	L 55–63	10–6 (2–3)	Reynolds Coliseum; Raleigh, North Carolina
January 23, 2003		at Georgia Tech	L 78–89 ^{OT}	10–7 (2–4)	Alexander Memorial Coliseum; Atlanta, Georgia
January 26, 2003		Wake Forest	W 61–45	11–7 (3–4)	Littlejohn Coliseum; Clemson, South Carolina
January 30, 2003		Florida State	L 57–59	11–8 (3–5)	Littlejohn Coliseum; Clemson, South Carolina
February 3, 2003		at Virginia	L 54–69	11–9 (3–6)	University Hall; Charlottesville, Virginia
February 6, 2003		No. 2 Duke	L 49–61	11–10 (3–7)	Littlejohn Coliseum; Clemson, South Carolina
February 9, 2003		Maryland	W 85–67	12–10 (4–7)	Littlejohn Coliseum; Clemson, South Carolina
February 16, 2003		at No. 8 North Carolina	L 66–70	12–11 (4–8)	Carmichael Arena; Chapel Hill, North Carolina
February 20, 2003		NC State	W 73–62	13–11 (5–8)	Littlejohn Coliseum; Clemson, South Carolina
February 23, 2003		Georgia Tech	L 63–78	13–12 (5–9)	Littlejohn Coliseum; Clemson, South Carolina
February 27, 2003		at Wake Forest	L 55–66	13–13 (5–10)	LJVM Coliseum; Winston-Salem, North Carolina
March 2, 2003		at Florida State	L 59–68	13–14 (5–11)	Tallahassee–Leon County Civic Center; Tallahassee, Florida
ACC Tournament
March 7, 2003*		vs. Maryland; ACC Tournament first round	W 63–61	14–14 (5–11)	Greensboro Coliseum; Greensboro, North Carolina
March 8, 2003*		vs. No. 11 North Carolina; ACC Tournament quarterfinal	L 71–80	14–15 (5–11)	Greensboro Coliseum; Greensboro, North Carolina
*Non-conference game. ^{#}Rankings from AP Poll. (#) Tournament seedings in parentheses.
