= 2003 SEC women's basketball tournament =

- Classification: Division I
- Teams: 12
- Site: Alltel Arena; North Little Rock, Arkansas
- Champions: LSU (2nd title)
- Winning coach: Sue Gunter (2nd title)
- MVP: Temeka Johnson (LSU)
- Attendance: 43,642

2002–03 SEC women's basketball standings
	Conf.				Overall
Team	W		L	PCT	W		L	PCT
No. 4 Tennessee	14	–	0	1.000	33	–	5	.868
No. 3 LSU ^{†}	11	–	3	.786	30	–	4	.882
No. 19 Georgia	10	–	4	.714	21	–	10	.677
No. 13 Mississippi State	10	–	4	.714	24	–	8	.750
No. 16 South Carolina	9	–	5	.643	23	–	8	.742
No. 14 Vanderbilt	9	–	5	.643	22	–	10	.688
No. 24 Arkansas	7	–	7	.500	22	–	11	.667
Auburn	5	–	9	.357	23	–	11	.676
Kentucky	4	–	10	.286	11	–	16	.407
Alabama	3	–	11	.214	13	–	15	.464
Florida	1	–	13	.071	9	–	19	.321
Ole Miss	1	–	13	.071	12	–	16	.429
† 2003 SEC tournament winner Rankings from AP poll

The 2003 Southeastern Conference women's basketball tournament was the postseason women's basketball tournament for the Southeastern Conference (SEC) held at the Verizon Arena (now the Simmons Bank Arena) in North Little Rock, Arkansas, from March 6 – 9, 2003.

LSU won the tournament by beating Tennessee on March 9, 2003 by the score of 78 to 62 and received the SEC's automatic bid to the 2003 NCAA Division I women's basketball tournament.

== Seeds ==
All teams in the conference participated in the tournament. Teams were seeded by their conference record.

Seed	School	Conference record	Overall record
1	Tennessee^{‡†}	14–0	33–5
2	LSU^{†}	11–3	30–4
3	Georgia^{†}	10–4	21–10
4	Mississippi State^{†}	10–4	24–8
5	South Carolina	9–5	23–8
6	Vanderbilt	9–5	22–10
7	Arkansas	7–7	22–11
8	Auburn	5–9	23–11
9	Kentucky	4–10	11–16
10	Alabama	3–11	13–15
‡ – SEC regular season champions, and tournament No. 1 seed. † – Received a bye in the conference tournament. Overall records include all games played in the SEC Tournament.

== Schedule ==
Game	Matchup^{#}	Score
First Round – Thurs, Mar 6
1	No. 5 South Carolina vs. No. 12 Ole Miss	79–64
2	No. 6 Vanderbilt vs. No. 11 Florida	74–58
3	No. 7 Arkansas vs. No. 10 Alabama	53–48
4	No. 8 Auburn vs. No. 9 Kentucky	68–62
Quarterfinal – Fri, Mar 7
5	No. 1 Tennessee vs. No. 8 Auburn	66–51
6	No. 2 LSU vs. No. 7 Arkansas	78–72
7	No. 3 Georgia vs. No. 6 Vanderbilt	70–74
8	No. 4 Mississippi State vs. No. 5 South Carolina	79–75
Semifinal – Sat, Mar 8
9	No. 1 Tennessee vs. No. 4 Mississippi State	79–75
10	No. 2 LSU vs. No. 6 Vanderbilt	78–69
Championship – Sun, Mar 9
11	No. 1 Tennessee vs. No. 2 LSU	62–78
# – Rankings denote tournament seed

== Bracket ==
First round Thursday, March 6
8	Auburn	68
9	Kentucky	62
5	South Carolina	79
12	Ole Miss	64
7	Arkansas	53
10	Alabama	48
6	Vanderbilt	74
11	Florida	58

Quarterfinals; Friday, March 7
1	Tennessee	66
8	Auburn	51
4	Mississippi State	79
5	South Carolina	75
2	LSU	78
7	Arkansas	72
3	Georgia	70
6	Vanderbilt	74

Semifinals; Saturday, March 8
1	Tennessee	76
4	Mississippi State	75
2	LSU	78
6	Vanderbilt	69

Championship game Sunday, March 9
1	Tennessee	62
2	LSU	78

Asterisk denotes game ended in overtime.

== All-Tournament team ==
- Shameka Christon, Arkansas
- Temeka Johnson, LSU (MVP)
- Seimone Augustus, LSU
- LaToya Thomas, Miss. State
- Kara Lawson, Tennessee
