= 2002–03 Duke Blue Devils women's basketball team =

2002–03 Duke Blue Devils women's basketball season

2002–03 Duke Blue Devils women's basketball

ACC Regular season champions ACC Tournament champions Paradise Jam champions Duke Women's Basketball Classic champions South Padre Shootout champions

NCAA tournament, Final Four
- Conference: Atlantic Coast Conference

Ranking
- Coaches: No. 4
- AP: No. 2
- Record: 35–2 (16–0 ACC)
- Head coach: Gail Goestenkors (11th season)
- Assistant coaches: Gale Valley (14th season); Georgia Schweitzer (2nd season); LaVonda Wagner (1st season)
- Home arena: Cameron Indoor Stadium

2002–03 ACC women's basketball standings
	Conf.				Overall
Team	W		L	PCT	W		L	PCT
No. 2 Duke †	16	–	0	1.000	35	–	2	.946
No. 12 North Carolina	13	–	3	.813	28	–	6	.824
Virginia	9	–	7	.563	17	–	14	.548
Georgia Tech	8	–	8	.500	20	–	11	.645
Florida State	8	–	8	.500	17	–	13	.567
NC State	6	–	10	.375	11	–	17	.393
Clemson	5	–	11	.313	14	–	15	.483
Maryland	4	–	12	.250	10	–	18	.357
Wake Forest	3	–	13	.188	13	–	15	.464
† 2003 ACC tournament winner Rankings from AP poll

The 2002–03 Duke Blue Devils women's basketball team represented Duke University during the 2002–03 NCAA Division I women's basketball season. The team was led by head coach Gail Goestenkors in her 11th season at the school, and played its home games at Cameron Indoor Stadium in Durham, North Carolina as members of the Atlantic Coast Conference. They finished the season 35–2, 16–0 in ACC play to win the regular season conference title. They followed that success by winning the 2003 ACC women's basketball tournament to receive the conference's automatic bid to the NCAA tournament. Playing as No. 1 seed in the Midwest region, the Blue Devils defeated Georgia State, Utah, Georgia, and Texas Tech to reach the Final Four in back-to-back seasons. In the National semifinal round, the Blue Devils were defeated by the No. 1 seed from the Mideast region, Tennessee, 66–56.

== Roster ==
2002–03 Duke Blue Devils women's basketball team
Players
Coaches

Pos.	#	Name	Height	Year	Previous school	Hometown
F	1	Mistie Bass	6 ft 3 in (1.91 m)	Fr	George S. Parker	Janesville, Wisconsin
G/F	20	Alana Beard	5 ft 11 in (1.8 m)	Jr	Southwood	Shreveport, Louisiana
G/F	25	Monique Currie (redshirt)	6 ft 0 in (1.83 m)	RS Fr	Bullis School	Washington, D.C.
G	24	Jessica Foley	6 ft 0 in (1.83 m)	Fr	AIS	Wodonga, Victoria, Australia
G	10	Lindsey Harding	5 ft 8 in (1.73 m)	Fr	Cy-Fair	Houston, Texas
G	32	Caitlin Howe	5 ft 10 in (1.78 m)	Fr	Fairport	Rochester, New York
G	12	Vicki Krapohl	5 ft 5 in (1.65 m)	Jr	Mount Pleasant	Mount Pleasant, Michigan
F	41	Michele Matyasovsky	6 ft 1 in (1.85 m)	Sr	Triton	Somerdale, New Jersey
G	3	Sheana Mosch	5 ft 10 in (1.78 m)	Sr	DuBois Central Catholic	Clearfield, Pennsylvania
F/C	22	Brooke Smith	6 ft 3 in (1.91 m)	Fr	Marin Catholic	Kentfield, California
F	33	Iciss Tillis	6 ft 4 in (1.93 m)	Jr	Cascia Hall Prep	Tulsa, Oklahoma
F/C	31	Wynter Whitley	6 ft 2 in (1.88 m)	So	Holy Innocents' Episcopal	Atlanta, Georgia

Head coach

- Gail Goestenkors (Saginaw Valley State)

Assistant coach(es)

- Gale Valley (Michigan State)
- Georgia Schweitzer (Duke)
- LaVonda Wagner (Mars Hill)

Legend

- (C) Team captain
- (S) Suspended
- (I) Ineligible
- (W) Walk-on
- Injured
- Current redshirt

Roster
Last update: May 16, 2025

== Schedule ==
Date time, TV	Rank^{#}	Opponent^{#}	Result	Record	Site (attendance) city, state
Non-conference regular season
November 22, 2002*	No. 1	East Carolina	W 108–46	1–0	Cameron Indoor Stadium (5,422); Durham, North Carolina
November 24, 2002*; 2:00 pm, ESPN2	No. 1	vs. No. 2 Tennessee; Jimmy V Women's Basketball Classic	W 76–55	2–0	RBC Center (13,174); Raleigh, North Carolina
November 28, 2002*	No. 1	vs. Hampton; Paradise Jam – Round Robin, Game 1	W 71–34	3–0	Sports and Fitness Center (1,071); St. Thomas, Virgin Islands
November 29, 2002*	No. 1	vs. Old Dominion; Paradise Jam – Round Robin, Game 2	W 65–52	4–0	Sports and Fitness Center (1,373); St. Thomas, Virgin Islands
November 30, 2002*	No. 1	vs. No. 17 Arkansas; Paradise Jam – Championship Game	W 74–72 ^{OT}	5–0	Sports and Fitness Center (1,867); St. Thomas, Virgin Islands
December 06, 2002*	No. 1	vs. Howard; Duke Women's Basketball Classic – Semifinals	W 128–53	6–0	Cameron Indoor Stadium (2,417); Durham, North Carolina
December 08, 2002*	No. 1	vs. St. Joseph's; Duke Women's Basketball Classic – Championship Game	W 82–48	7–0	Cameron Indoor Stadium (3,761); Durham, North Carolina
December 16, 2002*	No. 1	Charleston Southern	W 106–38	8–0	Cameron Indoor Stadium (2,710); Durham, North Carolina
December 18, 2002*	No. 1	Florida International	W 106–58	9–0	Cameron Indoor Stadium (4,107); Durham, North Carolina
December 21, 2002*	No. 1	at Tulsa	W 90–36	10–0	Reynolds Center (4,519); Tulsa, Oklahoma
December 27, 2002*	No. 1	vs. Detroit Mercy; South Padre Shootout – Semifinals	W 92–52	11–0	SPI Convention Centre (1,600); South Padre Island, Texas
December 29, 2002*	No. 1	vs. Iowa State; South Padre Shootout – Championship Game	W 88–59	12–0	SPI Convention Centre (2,000); South Padre Island, Texas
ACC Regular Season
January 06, 2003	No. 1	Clemson	W 69–53	13–0 (1–0)	Cameron Indoor Stadium (5,371); Durham, North Carolina
January 09, 2003	No. 1	at Georgia Tech	W 79–59	14–0 (2–0)	Alexander Memorial Coliseum (3,592); Atlanta, Georgia
January 13, 2003	No. 1	at Virginia	W 60–59	15–0 (3–0)	University Hall (4,172); Charlottesville, Virginia
January 16, 2003	No. 1	Wake Forest	W 71–61	16–0 (4–0)	Cameron Indoor Stadium (4,981); Durham, North Carolina
January 20, 2003; 7:30 pm, ESPN2	No. 1	at No. 9 North Carolina	W 78–67 ^{OT}	17–0 (5–0)	Carmichael Auditorium (10,180); Chapel Hill, North Carolina
January 23, 2003	No. 1	Maryland	W 101–52	18–0 (6–0)	Cameron Indoor Stadium (3,423); Durham, North Carolina
January 26, 2003	No. 1	Florida State	W 81–63	19–0 (7–0)	Cameron Indoor Stadium (7,534); Durham, North Carolina
January 29, 2003	No. 1	at NC State	W 54–44	20–0 (8–0)	Reynolds Coliseum (3,841); Raleigh, North Carolina
February 1, 2003*; 7:00 pm, ESPN2	No. 1	No. 2 Connecticut	L 65–77	20–1	Cameron Indoor Stadium (9,314); Durham, North Carolina
February 06, 2003	No. 2	at Clemson	W 61–49	21–1 (9–0)	Littlejohn Coliseum (3,112); Clemson, South Carolina
February 10, 2003	No. 2	Virginia	W 75–48	22–1 (10–0)	Cameron Indoor Stadium (6,247); Durham, North Carolina
February 13, 2003	No. 2	Georgia Tech	W 82–43	23–1 (11–0)	Cameron Indoor Stadium (4,417); Durham, North Carolina
February 17, 2003	No. 2	at Wake Forest	W 83–41	24–1 (12–0)	LJVM Coliseum (727); Winston-Salem, North Carolina
February 20, 2003	No. 2	No. 6 North Carolina	W 97–63	25–1 (13–0)	Cameron Indoor Stadium (9,314); Durham, North Carolina
February 24, 2003	No. 2	at Maryland	W 97–55	26–1 (14–0)	Comcast Center (4,167); College Park, Maryland
February 27, 2003	No. 2	at Florida State	W 70–49	27–1 (15–0)	Tallahassee–Leon County Civic Center (1,447); Tallahassee, Florida
March 02, 2003	No. 2	NC State	W 86–60	28–1 (16–0)	Cameron Indoor Stadium (8,874); Durham, North Carolina
ACC Tournament
March 07, 2003*	(1) No. 2	vs. (9) Wake Forest; Quarterfinals	W 64–59	29–1	Greensboro Coliseum (6,163); Greensboro, North Carolina
March 09, 2003*; 1:00 pm, FSN	(1) No. 2	vs. (5) Georgia Tech; Semifinals	W 76–52	30–1	Greensboro Coliseum (7,656); Greensboro, North Carolina
March 10, 2003*; 7:30 pm, FSN	(1) No. 2	vs. (2) No. 11 North Carolina; Championship Game	W 77–59	31–1	Greensboro Coliseum (11,126); Greensboro, North Carolina
NCAA Tournament
March 23, 2003*; 2:30 pm, ESPN2	(1 MW) No. 2	(16 MW) Georgia State; First Round	W 66–48	32–1	Cameron Indoor Stadium (5,167); Durham, North Carolina
March 25, 2003*; 7:00 pm, ESPN	(1 MW) No. 2	(8 MW) Utah; Second Round	W 65–54	33–1	Cameron Indoor Stadium (5,073); Durham, North Carolina
March 29, 2003*; 9:00 pm, ESPN	(1 MW) No. 2	vs. (5 MW) No. 19 Georgia; Sweet Sixteen	W 66–63	34–1	University Arena (16,182); Albuquerque, New Mexico
March 31, 2003*; 9:30 pm, ESPN	(1 MW) No. 2	vs. (2 MW) No. 7 Texas Tech; Elite Eight	W 57–51	35–1	University Arena (12,413); Albuquerque, New Mexico
April 06, 2003*; 7:00 pm, ESPN	(1 MW) No. 2	vs. (1 ME) No. 4 Tennessee; Final Four	L 56–66	35–2	Georgia Dome (28,210); Atlanta, Georgia
*Non-conference game. ^{#}Rankings from AP Poll. (#) Tournament seedings in parentheses. All times are in Eastern Time. MW = Mid-West, ME = Mid-East.

== Rankings ==
Ranking movements Legend: ██ Increase in ranking ██ Decrease in ranking
	Week																			
Poll	Pre	1	2	3	4	5	6	7	8	9	10	11	12	13	14	15	16	17	18	Final
AP	1	1	1	1	1	1	1	1	1	1	1	1	2	2	2	2	2	2	2	Not released
Coaches	1	1	1	1	1	1	1	1	1	1	1	1	2	2	2	2	2	2	1	4

== See also ==
- 2002-03 Duke Blue Devils men's basketball team
