= 2002–03 Tennessee Lady Volunteers basketball team =

2002–03 Tennessee Lady Volunteers basketball season

2002–03 Tennessee Lady Volunteers basketball

SEC regular season champions San Juan Shootout champions

NCAA tournament, Runner-up
- Conference: Southeastern Conference

Ranking
- Coaches: No. 2
- AP: No. 4
- Record: 33–5 (14–0 SEC)
- Head coach: Pat Summitt (29th season)
- Assistant coaches: Mickie DeMoss; Holly Warlick
- Home arena: Thompson–Boling Arena

2002–03 SEC women's basketball standings
	Conf.				Overall
Team	W		L	PCT	W		L	PCT
No. 4 Tennessee	14	–	0	1.000	33	–	5	.868
No. 3 LSU ^{†}	11	–	3	.786	30	–	4	.882
No. 19 Georgia	10	–	4	.714	21	–	10	.677
No. 13 Mississippi State	10	–	4	.714	24	–	8	.750
No. 16 South Carolina	9	–	5	.643	23	–	8	.742
No. 14 Vanderbilt	9	–	5	.643	22	–	10	.688
No. 24 Arkansas	7	–	7	.500	22	–	11	.667
Auburn	5	–	9	.357	23	–	11	.676
Kentucky	4	–	10	.286	11	–	16	.407
Alabama	3	–	11	.214	13	–	15	.464
Florida	1	–	13	.071	9	–	19	.321
Ole Miss	1	–	13	.071	12	–	16	.429
† 2003 SEC tournament winner Rankings from AP poll

The 2002–03 Tennessee Lady Volunteers basketball team represented the University of Tennessee as a member of the Southeastern Conference during the 2002–03 women's college basketball season. Coached by Pat Summitt, the Lady Volunteers played their home games at Thompson–Boling Arena in Knoxville, Tennessee. The team won the SEC regular season title, reached the National championship game of the NCAA tournament, and finished the season with a 33–5 record (14–0 SEC).

== Roster ==
2002–03 Tennessee Lady Volunteers women's basketball team
Players
Coaches

Pos.	#	Name	Height	Year	Previous school	Hometown
G	3	Tasha Butts	5 ft 11 in (1.8 m)	Jr	Baldwin	Milledgeville, GA
G	5	Shanna Zolman	5 ft 10 in (1.78 m)	Fr	Wawasee	Syracuse, Indiana
F	13	Gwen Jackson	6 ft 2 in (1.88 m)	Sr
G/F	20	Kara Lawson	5 ft 9 in (1.75 m)	Sr		Alexandria, Virginia
G	21	Loree Moore	5 ft 9 in (1.75 m)	So		Carson, California
G/F	25	Brittany Jackson	6 ft 0 in (1.83 m)	So		Cleveland, Tennessee
C	33	Ashley Robinson	6 ft 5 in (1.96 m)	Jr	South Grand Prairie	Grand Prairie, Texas
F	43	Shyra Ely	6 ft 2 in (1.88 m)	So	Ben Davis	Indianapolis, Indiana
C	50	Tye'sha Fluker	6 ft 5 in (1.96 m)	Fr	John Muir	Pasadena, CA

Head coach

- Pat Summitt

Assistant coach(es)

- Mickie DeMoss
- Holly Warlick

Legend

- (C) Team captain
- (S) Suspended
- (I) Ineligible
- (W) Walk-on
- Injured
- Current redshirt

Roster

== Schedule and results ==
Date time, TV	Rank^{#}	Opponent^{#}	Result	Record	Site city, state
Regular season
Nov 10, 2002*	No. 2	No. 22 Oklahoma	W 94–68	1–1	Thompson–Boling Arena; Knoxville, Tennessee
Nov 24, 2002*	No. 2	vs. No. 1 Duke; Jimmy V Classic	L 55–76	1–1	Reynolds Coliseum; Raleigh, NC
Nov 26, 2002*	No. 4	No. 21 George Washington	W 83–61	2–1	Thompson–Boling Arena; Knoxville, Tennessee
Dec 4, 2002*	No. 4	at Louisiana Tech	W 60–35	5–1	Thomas Assembly Center; Ruston, Louisiana
Dec 14, 2002*	No. 4	at USC	W 71–39	6–1	L.A. Sports Arena; Los Angeles, California
Dec 18, 2002*	No. 4	No. 5 Stanford	W 71–56	7–1	Thompson–Boling Arena; Knoxville, Tennessee
Dec 21, 2002*	No. 4	at No. 22 Texas	L 62–63	7–2	Frank Erwin Center; Austin, Texas
Dec 28, 2002*	No. 5	at No. 12 Notre Dame	W 77–61	8–2	Joyce Center; Notre Dame, Indiana
Jan 4, 2003*; CBS	No. 4	at No. 3 Connecticut	L 62–63 ^{OT}	8–3	Hartford Civic Center (16,294); Hartford, Connecticut
Jan 7, 2003*	No. 5	at Old Dominion	W 91–63	9–3	Norfolk Scope; Norfolk, Virginia
Jan 12, 2003	No. 4	Auburn	W 81–72	10–3 (1–0)	Thompson–Boling Arena; Knoxville, Tennessee
Feb 23, 2003	No. 3	at No. 4 LSU	W 68–65	24–3 (12–0)	Maravich Assembly Center; Baton Rouge, Louisiana
Feb 27, 2003	No. 3	No. 17 Vanderbilt	W 91–71	25–3 (13–0)	Thompson–Boling Arena; Knoxville, Tennessee
Mar 2, 2003	No. 3	at Kentucky	W 84–69	26–3 (14–0)	Rupp Arena; Lexington, Kentucky
SEC tournament
Mar 7, 2003*	(1) No. 3	vs. (8) Auburn; Quarterfinals	W 66–51	27–3	Alltel Arena; North Little Rock, Arkansas
Mar 8, 2003*	(1) No. 3	vs. (4) No. 10 Mississippi State; Semifinals	W 76–75	28–3	Alltel Arena; North Little Rock, Arkansas
Mar 9, 2003*	(1) No. 3	vs. (2) No. 6 LSU; Championship game	L 62–78	28–4	Alltel Arena; North Little Rock, Arkansas
NCAA tournament
Mar 22, 2003*	(1 ME) No. 4	(16 ME) Alabama State; First round	W 95–43	29–4	Thompson–Boling Arena; Knoxville, Tennessee
Mar 24, 2003*	(1 ME) No. 4	(8 ME) Virginia; Second round	W 81–51	30–4	Thompson–Boling Arena; Knoxville, Tennessee
Mar 29, 2003*	(1 ME) No. 4	(4 ME) No. 15 Penn State; Regional Semifinal – Sweet Sixteen	W 86–58	31–4	Thompson–Boling Arena; Knoxville, Tennessee
Mar 31, 2003*	(1 ME) No. 4	(2 ME) No. 11 Villanova; Regional Final – Elite Eight	W 73–49	32–4	Thompson–Boling Arena; Knoxville, Tennessee
Apr 6, 2003*; ESPN	(1 ME) No. 4	vs. (1 MW) No. 2 Duke; National Semifinal – Final Four	W 66–56	33–4	Georgia Dome; Atlanta, Georgia
Apr 8, 2003*; 8:30 p.m., ESPN	(1 ME) No. 4	vs. (1 E) No. 1 Connecticut; National Championship	L 68–73	33–5	Georgia Dome (28,210); Atlanta, Georgia
*Non-conference game. ^{#}Rankings from AP Poll. (#) Tournament seedings in parentheses. ME=Mideast.

== Rankings ==
Ranking movements Legend: ██ Increase in ranking ██ Decrease in ranking
	Week																			
Poll	Pre	1	2	3	4	5	6	7	8	9	10	11	12	13	14	15	16	17	18	Final
AP	2	2	4	4	4	4	5	5	5	5	4	4	3	3	3	3	3	4	4	Not released
Coaches	2	2	5	5	5	4	5	5	5	5	4	4	3	3	3	3	3	4	4	2
