= 2002–03 Texas Longhorns women's basketball team =

Intercollegiate basketball season

2002–03 Texas Longhorns women's basketball

Big 12 champion Big 12 tournament champion

NCAA tournament, Final Four
- Conference: Southwest Conference

Ranking
- Coaches: No. 4
- AP: No. 5
- Record: 29–6 (15–1 SWC)
- Head coach: Jody Conradt (27th season)
- Assistant coaches: Karen Aston; Fred Applin; Kathy Harston
- Home arena: Frank Erwin Center

2002–03 Big 12 Conference women's basketball standings
	Conf.				Overall
Team	W		L	PCT	W		L	PCT
No. 5 Texas †	15	–	1	.938	29	–	6	.829
No. 8 Kansas State	14	–	2	.875	29	–	5	.853
No. 7 Texas Tech	13	–	3	.813	29	–	6	.829
Colorado	11	–	5	.688	24	–	8	.750
Oklahoma	9	–	7	.563	19	–	13	.594
Missouri	9	–	7	.563	17	–	14	.548
Baylor	8	–	8	.500	24	–	11	.686
Iowa State	7	–	9	.438	12	–	16	.429
Kansas	3	–	13	.188	11	–	18	.379
Texas A&M	3	–	13	.188	10	–	18	.357
Oklahoma State	3	–	13	.188	8	–	21	.276
Nebraska	1	–	15	.063	8	–	20	.286
† 2003 Big 12 Tournament winner Rankings from AP poll

The 2002–03 Texas Longhorns women's basketball team represented the University of Texas at Austin in the 2002–03 college basketball season. It was head coach Jody Conradt's 27th season at Texas. The Longhorns were members of the Big 12 Conference and played their home games at the Frank Erwin Center. The team finished the season with a record of 29–6, 15–1 in Big 12 play to win the regular season and Big 12 tournament. They received an automatic bid to the NCAA women's basketball tournament where they reached the Final Four for the first time since the 1986–87 season.

== Roster ==
2002–03 Texas Longhorns women's basketball team
Players
Coaches

Pos.	#	Name	Height	Year	Previous school	Hometown
G	1	Tamra Cobbins	5 ft 4 in (1.63 m)	Fr	F.L. Schlagle	Kansas City, KS
G	1	Coco Reed	5 ft 11 in (1.8 m)	RS Fr	Jersey Village	Houston, TX
F	4	Kala Bowers	6 ft 2 in (1.88 m)	So	Woodward	Woodward, OK
G	5	Alisha Sare	5 ft 8 in (1.73 m)	Sr	Lewisville	Lewisville, TX
F	10	Jody Bell	6 ft 2 in (1.88 m)	So	Chestermere	Chestermere, AB
G	11	Jamie Carey	5 ft 6 in (1.68 m)	So	Horizon	Thornton, CO
G	12	Tai Dillard	5 ft 9 in (1.75 m)	Sr	Sam Houston	San Antonio, TX
G	14	Stephanie Thiel	5 ft 9 in (1.75 m)	Fr	Nazareth	Nazareth, TX
F	21	Heather Schreiber	6 ft 2 in (1.88 m)	So	Windthorst	Windthorst, TX
G	22	Nina Norman	5 ft 11 in (1.8 m)	Fr	Jersey Village	Houston, TX
F/C	34	BranDee Fry	6 ft 4 in (1.93 m)	Fr	Moss Point	Pascagoula, MS
F	41	Stacy Stephens	6 ft 1 in (1.85 m)	Jr	Winnsboro	Winnsboro, TX
F	43	Annissa Hastings	6 ft 2 in (1.88 m)	Jr	Sam Houston	San Antonio, TX
F	53	Merecedes Williams	6 ft 2 in (1.88 m)	So	Westfield	Houston, TX

Head coach

- Jody Conradt

Assistant coach(es)

- Karen Aston
- Fred Applin
- Kathy Harston

Legend

- (C) Team captain
- (S) Suspended
- (I) Ineligible
- (W) Walk-on
- Injured
- Current redshirt

Roster

== Schedule ==
Date time, TV	Rank^{#}	Opponent^{#}	Result	Record	Site (attendance) city, state
Regular season
November 22, 2002*	No. 12	at BYU	L 63–79	0–1	Marriott Center; Provo, UT
November 26, 2002*	No. 16	McNeese State	W 90–25	1–1	Frank Erwin Center; Austin, TX
December 4, 2002*	No. 17	Texas State	W 98–36	2–1	Frank Erwin Center; Austin, TX
December 7, 2002*	No. 17	at New Mexico	L 70–77	2–2	University Arena; Albuquerque, NM
December 10, 2002*; 7:00 pm	No. 23	TCU	W 86–54	3–2	Frank Erwin Center; Austin, TX
December 15, 2002*	No. 23	Southeastern Louisiana	W 106–42	4–2	Frank Erwin Center; Austin, TX
December 18, 2002*	No. 22	Texas–Arlington	W 73–44	5–2	Frank Erwin Center; Austin, TX
December 21, 2002*	No. 22	No. 4 Tennessee	W 63–62	6–2	Frank Erwin Center; Austin, TX
December 28, 2002*	No. 15	at No. 2 LSU	L 58–76	6–3	Maravich Assembly Center; Baton Rouge, LA
January 2, 2003*; 7:00 pm	No. 17	Texas A&M–Corpus Christi	W 64–37	7–3	Frank Erwin Center; Austin, TX
January 5, 2003*	No. 17	at Ohio State	L 66–70	7–4	Value City Arena; Columbus, OH
January 8, 2003	No. 20	Oklahoma State	W 77–44	8–4 (1–0)	Frank Erwin Center; Austin, TX
January 11, 2003	No. 20	at Missouri	W 70–59	9–4 (2–0)	Hearnes Center; Columbia, MO
January 15, 2003	No. 20	at Texas A&M	W 74–47	10–4 (3–0)	Reed Arena; College Station, TX
January 18, 2003	No. 20	Baylor	W 70–50	11–4 (4–0)	Frank Erwin Center; Austin, TX
January 22, 2003	No. 17	No. 7 Texas Tech	W 69–58	12–4 (5–0)	Frank Erwin Center; Austin, TX
January 25, 2003	No. 17	at No. 3 Kansas State	L 69–71	12–5 (5–1)	Bramlage Coliseum; Manhattan, KS
January 29, 2003	No. 11	at No. 19 Oklahoma	W 60–54	13–5 (6–1)	Lloyd Noble Center; Norman, OK
February 2, 2003	No. 11	Texas A&M	W 76–50	14–5 (7–1)	Frank Erwin Center; Austin, TX
February 8, 2003	No. 11	Kansas	W 89–47	15–5 (8–1)	Frank Erwin Center; Austin, TX
February 12, 2003	No. 11	at Oklahoma State	W 72–70	16–5 (9–1)	Gallagher-Iba Arena; Stillwater, OK
February 15, 2003	No. 11	at Iowa State	W 65–55	17–5 (10–1)	Hilton Coliseum; Ames, IA
February 19, 2003	No. 10	Colorado	W 75–55	18–5 (11–1)	Frank Erwin Center; Austin, TX
February 22, 2003	No. 10	Nebraska	W 86–54	19–5 (12–1)	Frank Erwin Center; Austin, TX
February 27, 2003	No. 10	at Baylor	W 79–57	20–5 (13–1)	Ferrell Center; Waco, TX
March 2, 2003	No. 10	at No. 8 Texas Tech	W 70–67	21–5 (14–1)	United Spirit Arena; Lubbock, TX
March 5, 2003	No. 5	Oklahoma	W 78–66	22–5 (15–1)	Frank Erwin Center; Austin, TX
Big 12 tournament
March 12, 2003*; 12:00 pm, FSN	(1) No. 5	vs. (9) Kansas; Quarterfinals	W 87–56	23–5	Reunion Arena (6,405); Dallas, TX
March 13, 2003*; 6:00 pm, FSN	(1) No. 5	vs. (4) Colorado; Semifinals	W 62–47	24–5	Reunion Arena (6,656); Dallas, TX
March 15, 2003*; 6:00 pm, FSN	(1) No. 5	vs. (3) No. 8 Texas Tech; Championship game	W 67–57	25–5	Reunion Arena (10,717); Dallas, TX
NCAA tournament
March 23, 2003*	(2 W) No. 5	vs. (15 W) Hampton; First round	W 90–46	26–5	Myrl Shoemaker Center; Cincinnati, OH
March 25, 2003*	(2 W) No. 5	vs. (7 W) No. 24 Arkansas; Second round	W 67–50	27–5	Myrl Shoemaker Center; Cincinnati, OH
March 30, 2003*	(2 W) No. 5	vs. (6 W) No. 17 Minnesota; Regional Semifinal – Sweet Sixteen	W 73–60	28–5	Maples Pavilion; Stanford, CA
April 1, 2003*	(2 W) No. 5	vs. (1 W) No. 3 LSU; Regional Final – Elite Eight	W 78–60	29–5	Maples Pavilion; Stanford, CA
April 6, 2003*; 8:50 pm, ESPN	(2 W) No. 5	vs. (1 E) No. 1 Connecticut; National Semifinal – Final Four	L 69–71	29–6	Georgia Dome (28,210); Atlanta
*Non-conference game. ^{#}Rankings from AP Poll. (#) Tournament seedings in parentheses. W=West.

== Rankings ==
Ranking movements Legend: ██ Increase in ranking ██ Decrease in ranking
	Week																			
Poll	Pre	1	2	3	4	5	6	7	8	9	10	11	12	13	14	15	16	17	18	Final
AP	11	12	16	17	23	22	15	17	20	20	17	11	11	11	10	10	5	5	5	Not released
Coaches	11	11	16	16	21	21	15	18	20	18	16	13	12	11	11	10	7	7	5	3

== See also ==
- 2002–03 Texas Longhorns men's basketball team
