= Jimmy V Classic =

College basketball event

- League: NCAA Division I
- Sport: College Basketball
- First season: 1995
- Organizing body: ESPN Events
- No. of teams: 4
- Venues: Madison Square Garden; New York City, New York
- Most recent champions: BYU; UConn
- Most titles: Duke Blue Devils (4)
- Broadcaster: ESPN

The Jimmy V Classic is an annual basketball game organized by ESPN Events to raise money for the V Foundation and awareness for cancer research. It is named after Jim Valvano and features clips from his speech at the 1993 ESPY Awards.

== History ==
The Men's Classic was first held in 1995. Since its inception, it has featured four teams in a double header played in a neutral stadium.

The Women's Classic began in 2002, also featuring four teams in a double header. In 2005, the Women's Classic shrunk to two teams playing a single game. Since then, the women's format has varied from two teams in a single game to as many as six teams in three games. Unlike the Men's Classic, each game of the Women's Classic is played at one of the competitors' home arenas.

== Men's yearly results ==
| Date | Location | Winning team | | Losing team | |
|---|---|---|---|---|---|
| December 22, 1995 | Meadowlands Arena (East Rutherford, NJ) | Temple | 74* | Kansas | 66 |
| December 22, 1995 | Meadowlands Arena (East Rutherford, NJ) | UMass | 75 | Georgia Tech | 67 |
| December 20, 1996 | Meadowlands Arena (East Rutherford, NJ) | California | 76 | Penn State | 63 |
| December 20, 1996 | Meadowlands Arena (East Rutherford, NJ) | North Carolina | 83 | UMass | 69 |
| December 19, 1997 | Meadowlands Arena (East Rutherford, NJ) | Princeton | 69 | Wake Forest | 64 |
| December 19, 1997 | Meadowlands Arena (East Rutherford, NJ) | Clemson | 62 | Seton Hall | 59 |
| December 22, 1998 | Meadowlands Arena (East Rutherford, NJ) | Purdue | 80 | South Carolina | 64 |
| December 22, 1998 | Meadowlands Arena (East Rutherford, NJ) | Duke | 71 | Kentucky | 60 |
| December 21, 1999 | Meadowlands Arena (East Rutherford, NJ) | Indiana | 82 | North Carolina | 73 |
| December 21, 1999 | Meadowlands Arena (East Rutherford, NJ) | Florida | 85 | Rutgers | 65 |
| December 19, 2000 | Meadowlands Arena (East Rutherford, NJ) | Virginia | 107 | Tennessee | 89 |
| December 19, 2000 | Meadowlands Arena (East Rutherford, NJ) | Michigan State | 72 | Seton Hall | 57 |
| December 18, 2001 | Meadowlands Arena (East Rutherford, NJ) | Duke | 95 | Kentucky | 92 |
| December 18, 2001 | Meadowlands Arena (East Rutherford, NJ) | Alabama | 70 | Temple | 67 |
| December 17, 2002 | Meadowlands Arena (East Rutherford, NJ) | Gonzaga | 69 | NC State | 60 |
| December 17, 2002 | Meadowlands Arena (East Rutherford, NJ) | Cincinnati | 77 | Oregon | 52 |
| December 9, 2003 | Madison Square Garden (New York, NY) | Providence | 70 | Illinois | 51 |
| December 9, 2003 | Madison Square Garden (New York, NY) | Arizona | 91 | Texas | 83 |
| December 7, 2004 | Madison Square Garden (New York, NY) | Pittsburgh | 70 | Memphis | 51 |
| December 7, 2004 | Madison Square Garden (New York, NY) | Oklahoma State | 74 | Syracuse | 60 |
| December 6, 2005 | Madison Square Garden (New York, NY) | Saint Joseph's | 70 | Kansas | 67 |
| December 6, 2005 | Madison Square Garden (New York, NY) | Michigan State | 77 | Boston College | 70 |
| December 5, 2006 | Madison Square Garden (New York, NY) | Oklahoma State | 72 | Syracuse | 68 |
| December 5, 2006 | Madison Square Garden (New York, NY) | Arizona | 72 | Louisville | 65 |
| December 4, 2007 | Madison Square Garden (New York, NY) | Memphis | 62 | USC | 58 |
| December 4, 2007 | Madison Square Garden (New York, NY) | Notre Dame | 68 | Kansas State | 59 |
| December 9, 2008 | Madison Square Garden (New York, NY) | Davidson | 68 | West Virginia | 65 |
| December 9, 2008 | Madison Square Garden (New York, NY) | Texas | 67 | Villanova | 58 |
| December 8, 2009 | Madison Square Garden (New York, NY) | Indiana | 74 | Pittsburgh | 64 |
| December 8, 2009 | Madison Square Garden (New York, NY) | Georgetown | 72 | Butler | 65 |
| December 7, 2010 | Madison Square Garden (New York, NY) | Kansas | 81 | Memphis | 68 |
| December 7, 2010 | Madison Square Garden (New York, NY) | Syracuse | 72 | Michigan State | 58 |
| December 6, 2011 | Madison Square Garden (New York, NY) | Missouri | 81 | Villanova | 71 |
| December 6, 2011 | Madison Square Garden (New York, NY) | Marquette | 79 | Washington | 77 |
| December 4, 2012 | Madison Square Garden (New York, NY) | Georgetown | 64 | Texas | 41 |
| December 4, 2012 | Madison Square Garden (New York, NY) | NC State | 69 | Connecticut | 65 |
| December 17, 2013 | Madison Square Garden (New York, NY) | Cincinnati | 44 | Pittsburgh | 43 |
| December 17, 2013 | Madison Square Garden (New York, NY) | Florida | 77 | Memphis | 75 |
| December 9, 2014 | Madison Square Garden (New York, NY) | Villanova | 73 | Illinois | 59 |
| December 9, 2014 | Madison Square Garden (New York, NY) | Louisville | 94 | Indiana | 74 |
| December 8, 2015 | Madison Square Garden (New York, NY) | Virginia | 70 | West Virginia | 54 |
| December 8, 2015 | Madison Square Garden (New York, NY) | Maryland | 76 | Connecticut | 66 |
| December 6, 2016 | Madison Square Garden (New York, NY) | Purdue | 97 | Arizona State | 64 |
| December 6, 2016 | Madison Square Garden (New York, NY) | Duke | 84 | Florida | 74 |
| December 5, 2017 | Madison Square Garden (New York, NY) | Villanova | 88 | Gonzaga | 72 |
| December 5, 2017 | Madison Square Garden (New York, NY) | Syracuse | 72 | Connecticut | 63 |
| December 4, 2018 | Madison Square Garden (New York, NY) | Oklahoma | 85 | Notre Dame | 80 |
| December 4, 2018 | Madison Square Garden (New York, NY) | Florida | 66 | West Virginia | 56 |
| December 10, 2019 | Madison Square Garden (New York, NY) | Texas Tech | 70 | Louisville | 57 |
| December 10, 2019 | Madison Square Garden (New York, NY) | Indiana | 57 | Connecticut | 54 |
| December 2, 2020 | Bankers Life Fieldhouse (Indianapolis, IN) | Gonzaga | 87 | West Virginia | 82 |
| December 2, 2020 | Bankers Life Fieldhouse (Indianapolis, IN) | Baylor | 82 | Illinois | 69 |
| December 7, 2021 | Madison Square Garden (New York, NY) | Texas Tech | 57* | Tennessee | 52 |
| December 7, 2021 | Madison Square Garden (New York, NY) | Villanova | 67 | Syracuse | 53 |
| December 6, 2022 | Madison Square Garden (New York, NY) | Illinois | 85 | Texas | 78 |
| December 6, 2022 | Madison Square Garden (New York, NY) | Duke | 74 | Iowa | 62 |
| December 5, 2023 | Madison Square Garden (New York, NY) | Illinois | 98 | Florida Atlantic | 89 |
| December 5, 2023 | Madison Square Garden (New York, NY) | UConn | 87 | North Carolina | 76 |
| December 10, 2024 | Madison Square Garden (New York, NY) | Tennessee | 75 | Miami (FL) | 62 |
| December 10, 2024 | Madison Square Garden (New York, NY) | Arkansas | 89 | Michigan | 87 |
| December 9, 2025 | Madison Square Garden (New York, NY) | BYU | 67 | Clemson | 64 |
| December 9, 2025 | Madison Square Garden (New York, NY) | UConn | 77 | Florida | 73 |

* denotes overtime period

== Men's wins by team ==
| Team | Wins | Years |
|---|---|---|
| Duke | 4 | 1998, 2001, 2016, 2022 |
| Florida | 3 | 1999, 2013, 2018 |
| Indiana | 3 | 1999, 2009, 2019 |
| Villanova | 3 | 2014, 2017, 2021 |
| Arizona | 2 | 2003, 2006 |
| Cincinnati | 2 | 2002, 2013 |
| Georgetown | 2 | 2009, 2012 |
| Gonzaga | 2 | 2002, 2020 |
| Illinois | 2 | 2022, 2023 |
| Michigan State | 2 | 2000, 2005 |
| Oklahoma State | 2 | 2004, 2006 |
| Purdue | 2 | 1998, 2016 |
| Syracuse | 2 | 2010, 2017 |
| Texas Tech | 2 | 2019, 2021 |
| Virginia | 2 | 2000, 2015 |
| UConn | 2 | 2023, 2025 |
| Alabama | 1 | 2001 |
| Arkansas | 1 | 2024 |
| Baylor | 1 | 2020 |
| BYU | 1 | 2025 |
| California | 1 | 1996 |
| Clemson | 1 | 1997 |
| Davidson | 1 | 2008 |
| Kansas | 1 | 2010 |
| Louisville | 1 | 2014 |
| Marquette | 1 | 2011 |
| Maryland | 1 | 2015 |
| Memphis | 1 | 2007 |
| Missouri | 1 | 2011 |
| NC State | 1 | 2012 |
| North Carolina | 1 | 1996 |
| Notre Dame | 1 | 2007 |
| Oklahoma | 1 | 2018 |
| Pittsburgh | 1 | 2004 |
| Princeton | 1 | 1997 |
| Providence | 1 | 2003 |
| Saint Joseph's | 1 | 2005 |
| Temple | 1 | 1995 |
| Tennessee | 1 | 2024 |
| Texas | 1 | 2008 |
| UMass | 1 | 1995 |

== Women's yearly results ==
| Date | Location | Winning team | | Losing team | |
|---|---|---|---|---|---|
| November 24, 2002 | Reynolds Coliseum (Raleigh, NC) | Duke | 76 | Tennessee | 55 |
| November 24, 2002 | Reynolds Coliseum (Raleigh, NC) | Connecticut | 78 | NC State | 50 |
| November 23, 2003 | Reynolds Coliseum (Raleigh, NC) | Texas | 69 | NC State | 56 |
| November 23, 2003 | Reynolds Coliseum (Raleigh, NC) | Duke | 93 | Purdue | 63 |
| November 21, 2004 | Reynolds Coliseum (Raleigh, NC) | North Carolina | 71 | Connecticut | 65 |
| November 21, 2004 | Reynolds Coliseum (Raleigh, NC) | Tennessee | 64 | NC State | 54 |
| December 5, 2005 | Hartford Civic Center (Hartford, CT) | North Carolina | 77 | Connecticut | 54 |
| December 4, 2006 | Louis Brown Athletic Center (Piscataway, NJ) | Duke | 85 | Rutgers | 45 |
| December 3, 2007 | Louis Brown Athletic Center (Piscataway, NJ) | Rutgers | 68 | Maryland | 60 |
| December 8, 2008 | Louis Brown Athletic Center (Piscataway, NJ) | Rutgers | 45 | Georgia | 34 |
| December 7, 2009 | Louis Brown Athletic Center (Piscataway, NJ) | Rutgers | 51 | Florida | 38 |
| December 6, 2010 | Cameron Indoor Stadium (Durham, NC) | Duke | 61 | Texas A&M | 58 |
| December 6, 2011 | XL Center (Hartford, CT) | Connecticut | 81 | Texas A&M | 51 |
| December 3, 2012 | XL Center (Hartford, CT) | Connecticut | 63 | Maryland | 48 |
| December 17, 2013 | Cameron Indoor Stadium (Durham, NC) | Connecticut | 83 | Duke | 61 |
| December 6, 2014 | Joyce Center (Notre Dame, IN) | Connecticut | 76 | Notre Dame | 58 |
| December 5, 2015 | Harry A. Gampel Pavilion (Storrs, CT) | Connecticut | 91 | Notre Dame | 81 |
| December 4, 2016 | Mohegan Sun Arena (Uncasville, CT) | Connecticut | 72 | Texas | 54 |
| December 3, 2017 | XL Center (Hartford, CT) | Connecticut | 80 | Notre Dame | 71 |
| December 2, 2018 | Joyce Center (Notre Dame, IN) | Connecticut | 89 | Notre Dame | 71 |
| December 8, 2019 | Harry A. Gampel Pavilion (Storrs, CT) | Connecticut | 81 | Notre Dame | 57 |
| December 3, 2020 | Colonial Life Arena (Columbia, SC) | NC State | 54 | South Carolina | 46 |
| December 4, 2020 | Mohegan Sun Arena (Uncasville, CT) | Louisville | 116 | DePaul | 75 |
| December 12, 2021 | KFC Yum! Center (Louisville, KY) | Louisville | 64 | Kentucky | 58 |
| December 12, 2021 | Colonial Life Arena (Columbia, SC) | South Carolina | 66 | Maryland | 59 |
| December 4, 2022 | Thompson–Boling Arena (Knoxville, TN) | Virginia Tech | 59 | Tennessee | 56 |
| December 4, 2022 | Joyce Center (Notre Dame, IN) | Notre Dame | 74 | UConn | 60 |
| December 3, 2023 | Cameron Indoor Stadium (Durham, NC) | South Carolina | 77 | Duke | 61 |
| December 3, 2023 | Moody Center (Austin, TX) | Texas | 80 | UConn | 68 |
| December 3, 2023 | Thompson–Boling Arena (Knoxville, TN) | Ohio State | 78 | Tennessee | 58 |
| December 15, 2024 | KFC Yum! Center (Louisville, KY) | NC State | 72 | Louisville | 42 |
| December 10, 2025 | Hilton Coliseum (Ames, IA) | Iowa State | 74 | Iowa | 69 |

== Women's wins by team ==
| Team | Wins | Years |
|---|---|---|
| UConn | 10 | 2002, 2011, 2012, 2013, 2014, 2015, 2016, 2017, 2018, 2019 |
| Duke | 4 | 2002, 2003, 2006, 2010 |
| Rutgers | 3 | 2007, 2008, 2009 |
| Louisville | 2 | 2020, 2021 |
| North Carolina | 2 | 2004, 2005 |
| NC State | 2 | 2020, 2024 |
| South Carolina | 2 | 2021, 2023 |
| Texas | 2 | 2003, 2023 |
| Notre Dame | 1 | 2022 |
| Tennessee | 1 | 2004 |
| Ohio State | 1 | 2023 |
| Virginia Tech | 1 | 2022 |
| Iowa State | 1 | 2025 |
