= Barbara Swanner =

American basketball coach

Coaching career (HC unless noted)
- 1979–1982: LSU

Head coaching record
- Overall: 57–50

Barbara Swanner was the head coach of the women's basketball team at Louisiana State University (LSU) from 1979 to 1982.

Swanner took over for head coach Jinks Coleman midway through the 1978–1979 season and led the Lady Tigers (then the BenGals) to a 57-50 record over the next 3½ years. Her teams went to three Association of Intercollegiate Athletics for Women (AIAW) Tournaments. She was succeeded by the legendary Sue Gunter in 1982.

== Head coaching record ==
Season	Team	Record	Postseason
1978–1979	LSU	5-5	AIAW Regionals
1979–1980	LSU	17-17	AIAW Regionals
1980–1981	LSU	17-15	AIAW Regionals
1981–1982	LSU	18-13	
TOTAL		57-50	
