= 2002–03 Connecticut Huskies women's basketball team =

Intercollegiate basketball season

2002–03 Connecticut Huskies women's basketball

NCAA tournament National Champions Big East regular season champions
- Conference: Big East Conference

Ranking
- Coaches: No. 1
- AP: No. 1
- Record: 37–1 (16–0 Big East)
- Head coach: Geno Auriemma (18th season)
- Associate head coach: Chris Dailey
- Assistant coaches: Tonya Cardoza; Jamelle Elliott
- Home arena: Harry A. Gampel Pavilion

2002–03 Big East Conference women's basketball standings
	Conf.				Overall
Team	W		L	PCT	W		L	PCT
No. 1 Connecticut	16	–	0	1.000	37	–	1	.974
No. 23 Rutgers	13	–	3	.813	21	–	8	.724
No. 11 Villanova †	12	–	4	.750	28	–	6	.824
No. T25 Boston College	12	–	4	.750	22	–	9	.710
Virginia Tech	10	–	6	.625	22	–	10	.688
Notre Dame	10	–	6	.625	21	–	11	.656
Miami (FL)	8	–	8	.500	18	–	13	.581
Seton Hall	7	–	9	.438	14	–	15	.483
Georgetown	6	–	10	.375	15	–	14	.517
Syracuse	5	–	11	.313	10	–	18	.357
West Virginia	4	–	12	.250	15	–	13	.536
Pittsburgh	4	–	12	.250	12	–	16	.429
Providence	3	–	13	.188	9	–	18	.333
St. John's	2	–	14	.125	8	–	19	.296
† 2003 Big East Tournament winner As of April 9, 2003; Rankings from AP poll

The 2002–03 Connecticut Huskies women's basketball team represented the University of Connecticut in the 2002–2003 NCAA Division I basketball season. Coached by Geno Auriemma, the Huskies played their home games at the Hartford Civic Center in Hartford, Connecticut, and on campus at the Harry A. Gampel Pavilion in Storrs, Connecticut, and are a member of the Big East Conference. The only loss the Huskies suffered all year was to Villanova in the championship game of the Big East women's basketball tournament. Villanova beat the Huskies by a score of 52–48. The Huskies won their fourth NCAA championship by defeating the Tennessee Volunteers, 73–68.

== Roster ==
2002–03 Connecticut Huskies women's basketball team
Players
Coaches

Pos.	#	Name	Height	Year	Previous school	Hometown
G	2	Ashley Valley	5 ft 9 in (1.75 m)	So	Rice Memorial	Colchester, Vermont
G/F	3	Diana Taurasi (C)	6 ft 0 in (1.83 m)	Jr	Don Lugo	Chino, California
G	5	Maria Conlon	5 ft 9 in (1.75 m)	Jr	Seymour	Derby, Connecticut
G	12	Stacey Marron	5 ft 9 in (1.75 m)	So	La Cueva	Albuquerque, New Mexico
G	20	Morgan Valley	6 ft 0 in (1.83 m)	Jr	Rice Memorial	Colchester, Vermont
G	21	Nicole Wolff	6 ft 0 in (1.83 m)	Fr	Walpole	Walpole, Massachusetts
F	22	Ashley Battle	6 ft 0 in (1.83 m)	RS So	The Linsly School	Pittsburgh, Pennsylvania
F/C	23	Willnett Crockett	6 ft 2 in (1.88 m)	Fr	Narbonne	Harbor City, California
C	31	Jessica Moore	6 ft 3 in (1.91 m)	RS So	Colony	Palmer, AK
G/F	33	Barbara Turner	6 ft 0 in (1.83 m)	Fr	East Technical	Cleveland, Ohio
G	43	Ann Strother	6 ft 2 in (1.88 m)	Fr	Highlands Ranch	Castle Rock, Colorado

Head coach

Geno Auriemma

Assistant coach(es)

Chris Dailey
Tonya Cardoza
Jamelle Elliott

Legend

- (C) Team captain
- (S) Suspended
- (I) Ineligible
- (W) Walk-on
- Injured
- Current redshirt

Roster
Last update: 2013-08-23

== Schedule ==
Date time, TV	Rank^{#}	Opponent^{#}	Result	Record	Site (attendance) city, state
Regular season
November 22, 2002*; 7:30 p.m., CPTV	No. 6	Wright State	W 85–39	1–0	Harry A. Gampel Pavilion (10167); Storrs, Connecticut
November 24, 2002*; 4:30 pm, ESPN	No. 6	at NC State; Jimmy V Classic	W 78–50	2–0	Raleigh Entertainment & Sports Arena (13174); Raleigh, North Carolina
November 29, 2002*; 7:20pm, CPTV	No. 5	vs. Denver; Wahine Classic	W 85–29	3–0	(2136); Honolulu, HI
November 30, 2002*; 11:07 am, CPTV	No. 5	at Hawaii; Wahine Classic	W 60–53	4–0	(1759); Honolulu, HI
December 01*; 3:25 pm, CPTV	No. 5	vs. No. 18 Oklahoma; Wahine Classic	W 73–60	5–0	(–); Honolulu, HI
December 5, 2002*; 7:37 p.m., CPTV	No. 3	at Holy Cross	W 68–46	6–0	Worcester Centrum (3823); Worcester, MA
December 7, 2002*; 2:00 p.m., CPTV	No. 3	USC	W 68–44	7–0	Hartford Civic Center (16294); Hartford, Connecticut
December 20, 2002*; 7:30 pm, CPTV	No. 3	Pepperdine	W 109–48	8–0	Harry A. Gampel Pavilion (10167); Storrs, Connecticut
December 22, 2002*; 2:00 p.m., CPTV	No. 3	St. Joseph's	W 82–48	9–0	Hartford Civic Center (16294); Hartford, Connecticut
December 28, 2002*; 7:00 pm, CPTV	No. 3	at South Florida	W 72–56	10–0	USF Sun Dome (3702); Tampa, FL
December 30, 2002*; 7:00 pm, CPTV	No. 3	at Florida State	W 74–55	11–0	Tallahassee-Leon County Civic Center (3011); Tallahassee, FL
January 4, 2003*; 2:00 p.m., CBS	No. 3	No. 5 Tennessee; Rivalry	W 63–62 ^{OT}	12–0	Hartford Civic Center (16294); Hartford, Connecticut
January 8, 2003; 7:00 p.m., CPTV	No. 3	Rutgers	W 67–62	13–0 (1-0)	Hartford Civic Center (16294); Hartford, Connecticut
January 12, 2003; 2:00 p.m., CPTV	No. 3	Virginia Tech	W 69–57	14–0 (2-0)	Harry A. Gampel Pavilion (10167); Storrs, Connecticut
January 15, 2003; 7 p.m., CPTV	No. 3	at Seton Hall	W 53–48	15–0 (3-0)	Walsh Gymnasium (2600); South Orange, NJ
January 18, 2003; 12:00 p.m., CPTV	No. 3	Georgetown	W 72–49	16–0 (4-0)	Hartford Civic Center (16294); Hartford, Connecticut
January 20, 2003; 2 p.m., espn2	No. 2	at Notre Dame; Rivalry	W 72–53	17–0 (5-0)	Phillip J. Purcell Pavilion (8265); South Bend, IN
January 25, 2003; 7:00 pm, CPTV	No. 2	at Pittsburgh	W 76–55	18–0 (6-0)	Petersen Events Center (12632); Pittsburgh, PA
January 29, 2003; 7:30 p.m., CPTV	No. 2	No. 20 Villanova	W 58–38	19–0 (7-0)	Harry A. Gampel Pavilion (10167); Storrs, Connecticut
February 1, 2003*; 7:03 pm, espn2	No. 2	at No. 1 Duke	W 77–65	20–0	Cameron Indoor Stadium (9314); Durham, NC
February 4, 2003; 7:30pm, CPTV	No. 1	at St. John's	W 87–46	21–0 (8-0)	Alumni Hall (4195); Queens, NY
February 8, 2003; 12 noon, FSNE	No. 1	at No. 23 Boston College	W 83–75	22–0 (9-0)	Conte Forum (8606); Chestnut Hill, MA
February 12, 2003; 7:00 pm, CPTV	No. 1	Syracuse	W 75–51	23–0 (10-0)	Hartford Civic Center (16294); Hartford, Connecticut
February 16, 2003; 2:00 p.m., CPTV	No. 1	Seton Hall	W 84–44	24–0 (11-0)	Harry A. Gampel Pavilion (10167); Storrs, Connecticut
February 19, 2003; 7 p.m., CPTV	No. 1	at Miami	W 81–60	25–0 (12-0)	UM Convocation Center (4973); Coral Gables, FL
February 23, 2003; 2:00 p.m., CPTV	No. 1	Notre Dame; Rivalry	W 77–59	26–0 (13-0)	Harry A. Gampel Pavilion (10167); Storrs, Connecticut
February 26, 2003; 8 p.m., CPTV	No. 1	at Georgetown	W 97–57	27–0 (14-0)	McDonough Memorial Gymnasium (1879); Washington, D.C.
March 1, 2003; 2:05 p.m., CPTV	No. 1	at Providence	W 70–52	28–0 (15-0)	Dunkin Donuts Center (2620); Providence, RI
March 4, 2003; 7:00 p.m., CPTV	No. 1	West Virginia	W 78–58	29–0 (16-0)	Hartford Civic Center (16294); Hartford, Connecticut
2003 Big East Women's Basketball Tournament
March 9, 2003; 2:00 p.m., CPTV	No. 1	vs. Seton Hall; Quarterfinals	W 70–47	30–0	Louis Brown Athletic Center (5695); Piscataway, NJ
March 10, 2003; 5:00 p.m., Fox Sports NE	No. 1	vs. vs Virginia Tech; Semifinals	W 71–54	31–0	Louis Brown Athletic Center (–); Piscataway, NJ
March 11, 2003; 7:00 p.m., ESPN2	No. 1	vs. No. 18 vs Villanova; Big East Championship Game	L 48–52	31–1	Louis Brown Athletic Center (4396); Piscataway, NJ
2003 NCAA Division I women's basketball tournament
March 23, 2003*; 12:00 p.m., ESPN2	(1) No. 1	vs. No. 16 Boston University; East Region - First Round	W 91–44	32–1	Harry A. Gampel Pavilion (8647); Storrs, Connecticut
March 25, 2003*; 9:15 p.m., ESPN2	(1) No. 1	vs. (9) TCU; East Region - Second Round	W 81–66	33–1	Harry A. Gampel Pavilion (9181); Storrs, Connecticut
March 30, 2003*; 12:00 pm, ESPN	(1) No. 1	vs. (5) No. 25 Boston College; East Region - Sweet 16	W 70–49	34–1	University of Dayton Arena (–); Dayton, Ohio
April 1, 2003*; 7:00 pm, ESPN	(1) No. 1	vs. (2) No. 10 vs Purdue; East Region - Elite Eight	W 73–64	35–1	University of Dayton Arena (8503); Dayton, Ohio
April 6, 2003*; 9:50 pm, ESPN	(1) No. 1	vs. (2) No. 5 vs Texas; Final Four	W 71–69	36–1	Georgia Dome (28210); Atlanta, GA
April 8, 2003*; 8:30 p.m., ESPN	(1) No. 1	vs. (1) No. 4 Tennessee; National Championship Game	W 73–68	37–1	Georgia Dome (28210); Atlanta, Georgia
*Non-conference game. ^{#}Rankings from AP Poll. (#) Tournament seedings in parentheses.

== Rankings ==
Ranking movements Legend: ██ Increase in ranking ██ Decrease in ranking
	Week																			
Poll	Pre	1	2	3	4	5	6	7	8	9	10	11	12	13	14	15	16	17	18	Final
AP	4	6	5	3	3	3	3	3	3	3	2	2	1	1	1	1	1	1	1	Not released
Coaches	5	5	4	2	2	2	2	2	2	2	2	2	1	1	1	1	1	1	2	1

== Team players drafted into the WNBA ==
- No one from the Huskies was selected in the 2003 WNBA draft.

== Awards and honors ==
- Diana Taurasi, Big East Conference Women's Basketball Player of the Year
- Diana Taurasi, Tournament Most Outstanding Player
- Diana Taurasi, Naismith Award
- Diana Taurasi, Wade Trophy

== Huskies of Honor induction ==
On December 29, 2013, the University of Connecticut inducted two women's basketball team, the National Championship winning teams of 2002–03 and 2003–04 into the Huskies of Honor.
