= Civic Center of Anderson =

Arena in South Carolina, United States

Coordinates: 34°32′15″N 82°40′48″W

The Civic Center of Anderson is part of a larger entertainment complex in Anderson, South Carolina, that also features baseball and soccer fields, tennis courts, an amphitheatre, a playground, and conference center. Together, the facility is known as the Anderson Sports and Entertainment Center. Constructed in 1991, the Civic Center itself is used for multiple indoor sports, shows, and concerts, and was host to the Big South Conference men's basketball tournament in 1991 and 1992 Both the Clemson men's basketball team and women's basketball team played in Anderson in 2002 during the renovation of Littlejohn Coliseum. The capacity of the 35,000-square-foot (3,300 m^{2}) building is 6,300. It served as the home of the Upstate Dragons of the American Arena League in 2018.

The Civic Center of Anderson has hosted Willie Nelson in '91, Athens' Widespread Panic in '93, Hootie in '99, Atlanta's Sevendust in '06, The Wallflowers in '08, Kenny Rogers in '10, and Atlanta's Blackberry Smoke in '22.
