= LaVonda Wagner =

American basketball player and coach

Biographical details
- Born: April 24, 1964 (age 62)

Playing career
- 1983–1986: Mars Hill College

Coaching career (HC unless noted)
- 1988–1994: East Tennessee State (asst.)
- 1994–2002: Illinois (asst.)
- 2002–2005: Duke (asst.)
- 2005–2010: Oregon State

Head coaching record
- Overall: 56–63

LaVonda Wagner (born April 24, 1964) is the former head coach of the Oregon State Beavers women's basketball team and is an FSN television analyst for WNBA games. She was fired from Oregon State on June 1, 2010, in the wake of a turbulent offseason that saw multiple player and assistant coach departures.

== Background and early career ==
LaVonda Wagner was born in 1964 in Bristol, Virginia. She attended Mars Hill College in North Carolina, where she earned a bachelor's degree in physical education. She was also a star for the women's basketball and volleyball teams, and earned All-America honors in both sports from the National Association of Intercollegiate Athletics (NAIA). In 1998, she was inducted into the college's sports hall of fame. In 1988, Wagner earned a master's degree in athletic administration from East Tennessee State University (ETSU). From 1988 to 1994 she was the top assistant coach and recruiter for ETSU in women's basketball. From 1994 to 2002 she was an assistant coach for the University of Illinois women's basketball team; in 2000 she helped garner one of the top five recruiting classes in the nation for Illinois. From 2002 to 2005 Wagner was an assistant coach at Duke University, which featured one of the top-rated women's basketball programs in the nation.

== Oregon State ==
Wagner joined the Beavers for the 2005–06 season, making a ten game improvement from the previous season and ending the year with a 16–15 overall record and a postseason Women's NIT berth. Her team went 9–19 in the 2006–07 season, and improved to 12–19 in 2007-08. Before her firing in 2010, her contract with the Beavers had been extended through 2012.
