= Hootie =

"Hootie" is a nickname for the following people:

- Hootie Ingram (1933–2024), American football player, coach, and athletics administrator
- Jay McShann (1916–2006), American jazz pianist and bandleader
- William "Hootie" Johnson (1931–2017), American businessman and golf administrator

== See also ==
- Hootie & the Blowfish
- Hootie Mack, 1993 album by Bell Biv DeVoe
