= LSU Tigers women's basketball =

Louisiana State University team

2026–27 LSU Tigers women's basketball team
- University: Louisiana State University
- Founded: 1975 (51 years ago)
- Athletic director: Verge Ausberry
- Head coach: Kim Mulkey (6th season)
- Location: Baton Rouge, Louisiana
- Arena: Pete Maravich Assembly Center (capacity: 13,472)
- Conference: SEC
- Nickname: Lady Tigers
- Colors: Purple and gold

NCAA Division I tournament champions
- 2023
Other NCAA Division I tournament results
Final Four	2004, 2005, 2006, 2007, 2008, 2023
Elite Eight	1986, 2000, 2003, 2004, 2005, 2006, 2007, 2008, 2023, 2024, 2025
Sweet Sixteen	1984, 1986, 1989, 1997, 1999, 2000, 2003, 2004, 2005, 2006, 2007, 2008, 2013, 2014, 2023, 2024, 2025, 2026
Appearances	1984, 1986, 1987, 1988, 1989, 1990, 1991, 1997, 1999, 2000, 2001, 2002, 2003, 2004, 2005, 2006, 2007, 2008, 2009, 2010, 2012, 2013, 2014, 2015, 2017, 2018, 2022, 2023, 2024, 2025, 2026

AIAW tournament runner-up
- 1977
Other AIAW tournament results
Final Four	1977
Appearances	1977

Conference tournament champions
- 1991, 2003

Conference regular-season champions
- 2005, 2006, 2008

Uniforms
Home	Away	Alternate

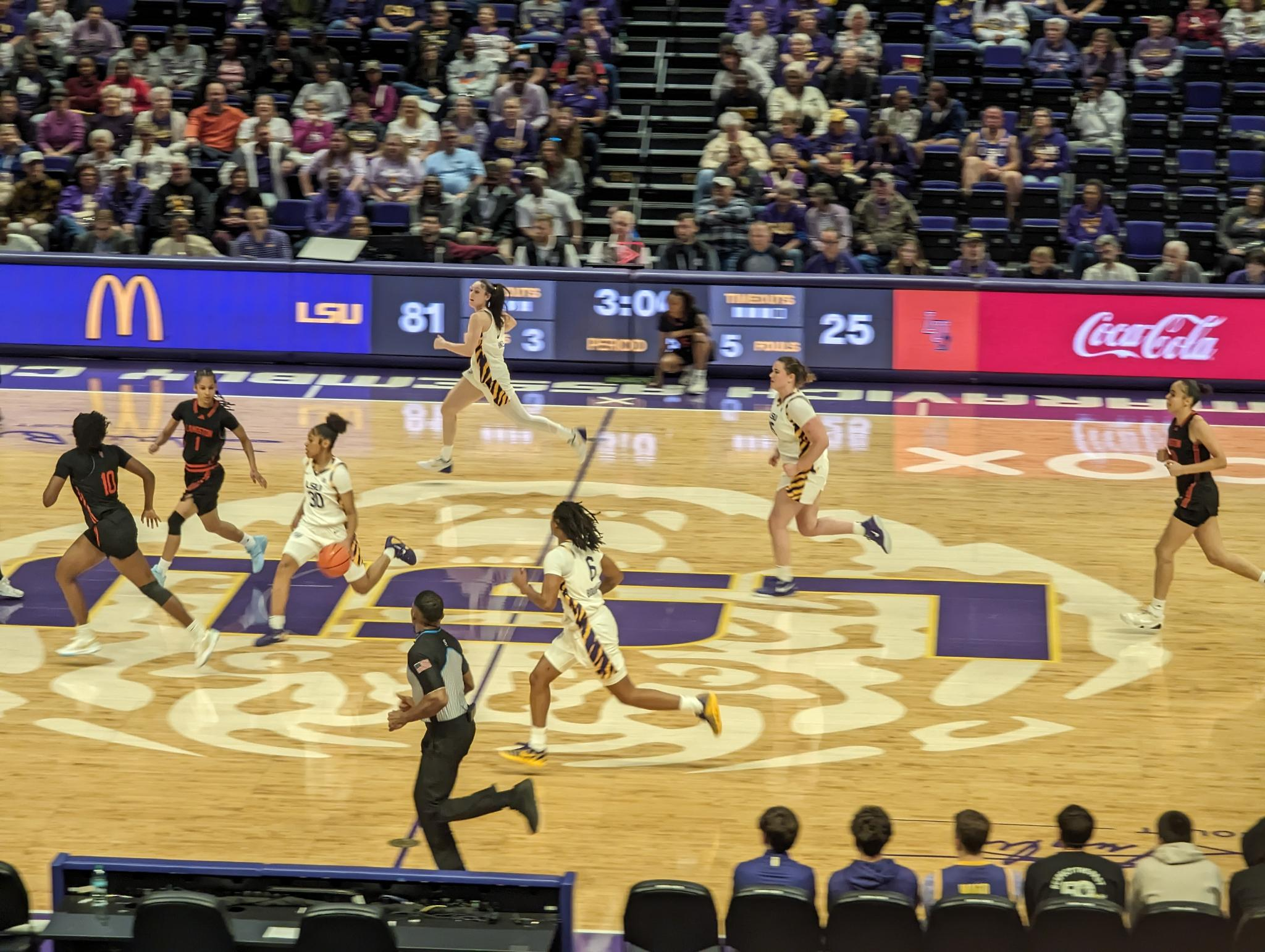
LSU Lady Tigers play in the Pete Maravich Assembly Center on October 31, 2025

The LSU Tigers women's basketball team represents Louisiana State University in NCAA Division I women's college basketball. The head coach is Kim Mulkey, the former head coach at Baylor University, who was hired on April 25, 2021 to replace Nikki Fargas, who had been head coach since the 2011–2012 season. The team plays its home games in the Pete Maravich Assembly Center located on the LSU campus in Baton Rouge, Louisiana.

LSU was the 2023 NCAA national champion, having defeated Iowa 102–85 in the national championship game.

== Roster ==
2026–27 LSU Tigers women's basketball team
Players
Coaches

Pos.	#	Name	Height	Year	Previous school	Hometown
G	2	Grace Knox	6 ft 2 in (1.88 m)	So	Etiwanda HS	Rancho Cucamonga, CA (United States) (California)
G	11	ZaKiyah Johnson	6 ft 0 in (1.83 m)	So	Sacred Heart Academy	Shelbyville, KY (United States) (Kentucky)
G	12	Mikaylah Williams	6 ft 0 in (1.83 m)	Sr	Parkway HS	Bossier City, LA (United States) (Louisiana)
F	13	Kate Koval	6 ft 5 in (1.96 m)	Jr	Notre Dame	Kyiv, Ukraine
F	15	Meghan Yarnevich	6 ft 2 in (1.88 m)	So	Bullis School	Potomac, MD (United States) (Maryland)
G	23	MiLaysia Fulwiley	5 ft 10 in (1.78 m)	Sr	South Carolina	Columbia, SC (United States) (South Carolina)
G	tbd	Laila Reynolds	6 ft 1 in (1.85 m)	Sr	Florida	PG County, MD (United States) (Maryland)
G	tbd	Jada Williams	5 ft 8 in (1.73 m)	Sr	Iowa State	Kansas City, MO (United States) (Missouri)
F	tbd	Lola Lampley	6 ft 2 in (1.88 m)	Fr	Lawrence Central	Indianapolis, IN (United States) (Indiana)
G	tbd	Noa Morro	6 ft 3 in (1.91 m)	Sr	EuroLeague	Mallorca, ESP (Spain)
G	tbd	Chloe Larry	5 ft 8 in (1.73 m)	Jr	Tennessee Tech	Bossier City, LA (United States) (Louisiana)

Head coach

- Kim Mulkey (Louisiana Tech)

Assistant coach(es)

- Bob Starkey
- Fitzroy Anthony (Palm Beach Atlantic)
- Kaylin Rice (Baylor)
- Joe Schwartz (Texas)
- Seimone Augustus (LSU)

Legend

- (C) Team captain
- (S) Suspended
- (I) Ineligible
- (W) Walk-on
- Injured
- Current redshirt

Roster

== History ==
Through the 2024–25 season, LSU has made 31 AIAW/NCAA tournament appearances including 17 Sweet Sixteens, 11 Elite Eights, and six Final Fours – highlighted by a national championship in 2023. The Lady Tigers have won the SEC regular season championship three times and the SEC Tournament championship twice.

=== Coleman-Swanner era (1975–1982) ===
LSU women's basketball officially began in the 1975–76 season under coach Jinks Coleman. In the inaugural year, the Tigers went 17–14, advancing past the state tournament into regional AIAW play. A highlight came in the next season (1976–77) when Maree Jackson poured in 47 points to score over 40 in a single game—LSU's first-ever win over a ranked opponent (UNLV) in a thrilling 92–89 victory. The Lady Tigers also recorded their first 100-point game that season, defeating West Texas State 109–48—marking early offensive prowess. That same year, LSU reached the AIAW national championship game but fell to powerhouse Delta State, finishing runner‑up in only their second season. Coleman resigned early in the 1978–79 campaign, and Barbara Swanner took over, guiding the program through the transition to NCAA governance in 1981. The team did not qualify for the inaugural NCAA women's tournament, but laid groundwork in recruiting and structural stability during her tenure

=== Sue Gunter era (1982–2004) ===
Entering the NCAA era, LSU tapped Sue Gunter, a future Hall of Famer, to transform the Lady Tigers into a consistent postseason program. Over 22 seasons, Gunter accumulated a 442–220 record (approximately .667-win percentage), regularly achieving 20-win campaigns. Her squads appeared in 14 NCAA tournaments and captured two SEC Tournament titles (1991, 2003), although heavyweights like Tennessee and Auburn often overshadowed in conference play. In 1985, Gunter also led LSU to a WNIT championship. The pinnacle came in 2003–04: Gunter took medical leave mid-season, and top assistant Pokey Chatman stepped in as interim. Chatman led LSU to its first-ever NCAA Final Four, though the season is officially credited to Gunter. Gunter retired shortly thereafter, leaving behind one of the most stable programs in women's college basketball at the time. She died on August 4, 2005.

=== Pokey Chatman era (2004–2007) ===
Elevated to permanent head coach in 2004, Pokey Chatman immediately raised LSU's ceiling to even greater heights. In 2004–05, the Tigers posted a 33–3 record, went 14–0 in SEC regular-season play, won the SEC title, and reached the Final Four—led by phenomenal junior Seimone Augustus, who earned consecutive National Player of the Year honors (Naismith, Wooden, Wade, USBWA, AP) in 2005 and 2006. Augustus finished her LSU career averaging 19.3 points, 5.2 rebounds, and 2.0 assists per game and became the first female LSU athlete to have her jersey (#33) retired in 2010 and a statue unveiled in 2023. Chatman's squads repeated Final Four appearances in 2006 (31–4) and 2007 (30–8), making LSU the only program to reach the four straight Final Fours in their first attempt (2004–07). Chatman resigned abruptly just before the 2007 NCAA Tournament; assistant Bob Starkey was appointed interim head coach and guided LSU to their fourth consecutive Final Four, a notable one-month turnaround. Chatman's final LSU record stood at 94–15, with LSU becoming a national powerhouse during her tenure.

=== Van Chancellor era (2007–2011) ===
In April 2007, LSU hired veteran coach Van Chancellor, already legendary for his WNBA success with the Houston Comets. In his first year (2007–08), Chancellor led LSU to a 31–6 overall record, a SEC regular-season championship (14–0 SEC), and the fifth straight Final Four appearance—a feat matched only by UConn's dominance. He was named SEC Coach of the Year. Over four seasons, Chancellor maintained competitive excellence, compiling a 90–40 record and keeping LSU firmly in national postseason contention.

=== Nikki Fargas era (2011–2021) ===
Following Chancellor's retirement, Nikki Fargas (an All-American for the Tennessee Lady Volunteers under Hall of Fame coach Pat Summitt under her maiden name, Nikki Caldwell) assumed the helm for the 2011–12 campaign. Over ten seasons, she coached LSU to a 148–106 overall record, led the team to six NCAA Tournament appearances, and reached the Sweet Sixteen twice (2013, 2014). While deep postseason success eluded LSU during her tenure, Fargas maintained program stability in the ultra-competitive SEC environment dominated by Tennessee, South Carolina, and others.

=== Kim Mulkey era (2021–present) ===
On April 25, 2021, LSU hired Kim Mulkey, a Hall of Fame coach who had guided Baylor to three NCAA championships, to the head coach position. Within two seasons, Mulkey dramatically reshaped the Tigers into a national powerhouse.

==== 2021–22: Culture Shift ====
In her first season, Mulkey revamped the teams roster and staff, setting in motion infrastructure that paid immediate dividends. By season's end, LSU posted a 26–6 record, marking a dramatic turnaround. Mulkey achieved her 100th LSU victory in just 114 games, outpacing Gunter's pace. In 2024, Seimone Augustus rejoined the program—this time as an assistant coach—bringing continuity and legacy.

==== 2022–23: 1st National Championship ====
The 2022–23 team delivered LSU's first-ever NCAA title, finishing 34–2. Junior transfer Angel Reese dominated with averages of 23.0 ppg and 15.4 rpg, leading the NCAA in total rebounds and free throws made (240) and securing 34 double-doubles—both SEC and NCAA single-season records. Jasmine Carson contributed 22 key points off the bench. In the National Semifinals, LSU overcame a 12–point deficit in the second half to defeat #1 seeded Virginia Tech 79–72 and reach their first ever title game. In the championship game on April 2, 2023, LSU defeated Iowa 102–85 at Dallas's American Airlines Center, setting the record for points in a championship game and first-half high (59 points by LSU). The win drew 9.17 million viewers on ABC—a record for women's college basketball. Mulkey became the first coach to win Division I titles at two separate schools.

==== 2023–24: Continued Excellence ====
In the 2023–24 season, LSU entered ranked No. 1 in preseason polls. The Tigers returned to the Elite Eight, meeting #1 seeded Iowa again in a high-profile showdown. Iowa's Caitlin Clark exploded for 41 points and 12 assists, edging LSU 94–87. Reese registered 17 points and 20 rebounds before fouling out of that game. She led the SEC in scoring and rebounding (18.6 PPG, 13.4 PPG), earning SEC Player of the Year, and LSU remained a national draw. After the season's completion, Reese was drafted 7th overall in the WNBA draft by the Chicago Sky.

==== 2024–25: Aneesah Morrow Emerges ====
In the 2024–25 season, senior transfer Aneesah Morrow blossomed into the team's interior anchor, finishing with averages of 18.7 PPG and 13.5 RPG, totaling 104 career double-doubles—second most in NCAA Division I history—and 1,714 career rebounds (third-most all time). She won the Katrina McClain Award and was First-Team All‑SEC. LSU reached its third straight Elite Eight as a #3 seed but ultimately fell to the #1 overall seed UCLA 72–65. Mulkey publicly lauded longtime assistant Bob Starkey, who has coached LSU since 1990, when he was hired by longtime men's basketball coach Dale Brown, helped produce six Final Fours, including stepping in as interim coach in 2007, and holds a 663–235 (.738) career record—advocating that he deserves Hall of Fame recognition. In 2025 the Tigers set a new NCAA record of hundred-point or more games in a row with their seventh such game.

== Championships ==
=== Final Fours ===
LSU has played in six Final Fours in the NCAA Women's Division I Basketball Championship tournament.

Year	Coach	Record
2003–04	Sue Gunter	27–7
2004–05	Pokey Chatman	33–3
2005–06	Pokey Chatman	31–4
2006–07	Pokey Chatman	30–8
2007–08	Van Chancellor	31–6
2022–23	Kim Mulkey	32–2
Total Final Fours: 6

=== Conference championships ===
LSU has won three regular-season conference championships and two conference tournament championships in the Southeastern Conference (SEC).

Year	Conference	Coach	Overall Record	Conference Record
1990–91	SEC tournament	Sue Gunter	24–7	5–4
2002–03	SEC tournament	Sue Gunter	30–4	11–3
2004–05	SEC	Pokey Chatman	33–3	14–0
2005–06	SEC	Pokey Chatman	31–4	13–1
2007–08	SEC	Van Chancellor	31–6	14–0
Total conference championships: 5

== Year by year results ==
Season	Team	Overall	Conference	Standing	Postseason	Coaches' poll	AP poll
Jinks Coleman (Independent) (1975–1979)
1975–76	Jinks Coleman	17–14	–		AIAW Regional		
1976–77	Jinks Coleman	29–8	–		AIAW Second Place		11
1977–78	Jinks Coleman	37–3	–		AIAW Regional		10
1978–79	Jinks Coleman	8–7	–				
Jinks Coleman:		91–32	–				
Barbara Swanner (Independent, SEC) (1979–1982)
1979	Barbara Swanner	5–5	–		AIAW Regional		
1979–80	Barbara Swanner	17–17	–		AIAW Regional		
1980–81	Barbara Swanner	17–15	–		AIAW Regional		
1981–82	Barbara Swanner	18–13	–				
Barbara Swanner:		57–50	–				
Sue Gunter (SEC) (1982–2004)
1982–83	Sue Gunter	20–7	6–2	T-1st (SEC West)			20
1983–84	Sue Gunter	23–7	5–3	T-2nd (SEC West)	NCAA Sweet Sixteen		8
1984–85	Sue Gunter	20–9	4–4	3rd (SEC West)	NWIT Champions		
1985–86	Sue Gunter	27–6	6–3	T-2nd	NCAA Elite Eight	8	9
1986–87	Sue Gunter	20–8	6–3	T-4th	NCAA Second Round (Bye)	19	14
1987–88	Sue Gunter	18–11	6–3	3rd	NCAA First Round		
1988–89	Sue Gunter	19–11	5–4	T-4th	NCAA Sweet Sixteen	14	
1989–90	Sue Gunter	21–9	4–5	T-6th	NCAA First Round		23
1990–91	Sue Gunter	24–7	5–4	4th#	NCAA Second Round (Bye)	18	8
1991–92	Sue Gunter	16–13	4–7	T-7th			
1992–93	Sue Gunter	9–18	0–11	12th			
1993–94	Sue Gunter	11–16	2–9	T-10th			
1994–95	Sue Gunter	7–20	1–10	T-10th			
1995–96	Sue Gunter	21–11	4–7	T-8th	NWIT Third Place		
1996–97	Sue Gunter	25–5	9–3	T-3rd	NCAA Sweet Sixteen	12	9
1997–98	Sue Gunter	19–13	7–7	T-6th	WNIT Semifinals		
1998–99	Sue Gunter	22–8	10–4	2nd	NCAA Sweet Sixteen	21	21
1999–2000	Sue Gunter	25–7	11–3	3rd	NCAA Elite Eight	8	15
2000–01	Sue Gunter	20–11	8–6	T-4th	NCAA Second Round	20	18
2001–02	Sue Gunter	18–12	8–6	T-4th	NCAA Second Round	22	22
2002–03	Sue Gunter	30–4	11–3	2nd#	NCAA Elite Eight	5	3
2003–04	Sue Gunter	27–7	10–4	2nd	NCAA Final Four	3	19
Sue Gunter:		442–220	132–111				
Pokey Chatman (SEC) (2004–2007)
2004–05	Pokey Chatman	33–3	14–0	1st	NCAA Final Four	3	2
2005–06	Pokey Chatman	31–4	13–1	1st	NCAA Final Four	4	5
2006–07	Pokey Chatman	30–8	10–4	T-3rd	NCAA Final Four	4	12
Pokey Chatman:		94–15	37–5				
Van Chancellor (SEC) (2007–2011)
2007–08	Van Chancellor	31–6	14–0	1st	NCAA Final Four	4	6
2008–09	Van Chancellor	19–11	10–4	T-2nd	NCAA Second Round		
2009–10	Van Chancellor	21–10	9–7	T-3rd	NCAA Second Round	25	21
2010–11	Van Chancellor	19–13	8–8	T-5th			
Van Chancellor:		90–40	41–19				
Nikki Fargas (SEC) (2011–2021)
2011–12	Nikki Caldwell	23–11	10–6	T-4th	NCAA Second Round		
2012–13	Nikki Caldwell	22–12	10–6	6th	NCAA Sweet Sixteen		
2013–14	Nikki Fargas	21–13	7–9	T-6th	NCAA Sweet Sixteen		
2014–15	Nikki Fargas	17–14	10–6	T-4th	NCAA First Round		
2015–16	Nikki Fargas	10–21	3–13	13th			
2016–17	Nikki Fargas	20–12	8–8	7th	NCAA First Round		
2017–18	Nikki Fargas	18–7	10–4	3rd	NCAA First Round	24	
2018–19	Nikki Fargas	16–13	7–9	6th	Turned down NIT Bid		
2019–20	Nikki Fargas	20–10	9-7	7th	Tournament Cancelled Due to Covid-19		
2020–21	Nikki Fargas	9–13	6–8	8th			
Nikki Fargas:		176–126	80–76				
Kim Mulkey (SEC) (2021–present)
2021–22	Kim Mulkey	26–6	13–3	2nd	NCAA Second Round	12	9
2022–23	Kim Mulkey	34–2	15–1	2nd	NCAA National Champions	1	9
2023–24	Kim Mulkey	31–6	13-3	2nd	NCAA Elite Eight	7	6
2024–25	Kim Mulkey	31–6	12-4	3rd	NCAA Elite Eight	10	10
2025–26	Kim Mulkey	29–6	12-4	4th	NCAA Sweet Sixteen	5	5
Kim Mulkey:		151–26	65–15				
Total:		1,099–509					
National champion Postseason invitational champion Conference regular season champion Conference regular season and conference tournament champion Division regular season champion Division regular season and conference tournament champion Conference tournament champion

Conference tournament winners noted with #

== Postseason ==
=== NCAA Tournament seeding history ===
Years	'84	'86	'87	'88	'89	'90	'91	'97	'99	'00	'01	'02	'03	'04	'05	'06	'07	'08	'09	'10	'12	'13	'14	'15	'17	'18	'22	'23	'24	'25	'26
Seeds	5	2	4	9	4	9	2	4	4	3	6	6	1	4	1	1	3	2	6	7	5	6	7	11	8	6	3	3	3	3	2

=== NCAA Division I ===
LSU has appeared in the NCAA Division I women's basketball tournament 30 times. They have a record of 58–30.

Year	Seed	Round	Opponent	Result
1984	#5	First Round; Sweet Sixteen	#4 Missouri #1 Louisiana Tech	W 92–82; L 67–92
1986	#2	Second Round; Sweet Sixteen; Elite Eight	#10 Middle Tenn #3 Ohio State #4 Tennessee	W 78–65; W 81–80; L 65–67
1987	#4	Second Round	#5 Southern Illinois	L 56–70
1988	#9	First Round	#8 Stephen F. Austin	L 62–84
1989	#4	Second Round; Sweet Sixteen	#5 Purdue #1 Louisiana Tech	W 54–53; L 68–85
1990	#9	First Round	#8 Southern Miss	L 65–75
1991	#2	First Round	#10 Lamar	L 73–93
1997	#4	First Round; Second Round; Sweet Sixteen	#13 Maine #12 Marquette #1 Old Dominion	W 88–79; W 71–58; L 49–62
1999	#4	First Round; Second Round; Sweet Sixteen	#13 Evansville #5 Notre Dame #1 Louisiana Tech	W 78–69; W 74–64; L 52–73
2000	#3	First Round; Second Round; Sweet Sixteen; Elite Eight	#14 Liberty #11 Stephen F. Austin #2 Duke #1 UConn	W 77–54; W 57–45; W 79–66; L 71–86
2001	#6	First Round; Second Round	#11 Arizona State #3 Purdue	W 83–66; L 70–73
2002	#6	First Round; Second Round	#11 Santa Clara #3 Colorado	W 84–78; L 58–69
2003	#1	First Round; Second Round; Sweet Sixteen; Elite Eight	#16 Texas State #8 Green Bay #5 Louisiana Tech #2 Texas	W 86–50; W 80–69; W 69–63; L 60–78
2004	#4	First Round; Second Round; Sweet Sixteen; Elite Eight; Final Four	#13 Austin Peay #12 Maryland #1 Texas #3 Georgia #1 Tennessee	W 83–66; W 76–61; W 71–55; W 62–60; L 50–52
2005	#1	First Round; Second Round; Sweet Sixteen; Elite Eight; Final Four	#16 Stetson #9 Arizona #13 Liberty #2 Duke #2 Baylor	W 70–36; W 76–43; W 90–48; W 59–49; L 57–68
2006	#1	First Round; Second Round; Sweet Sixteen; Elite Eight; Final Four	#16 Florida Atlantic #9 Washington #4 DePaul #3 Stanford #1 Duke	W 72–48; W 72–49; W 66–56; W 62–59; L 45–64
2007	#3	First Round; Second Round; Sweet Sixteen; Elite Eight; Final Four	#14 UNC Asheville #11 West Virginia #10 Florida State #1 Connecticut #4 Rutgers	W 77–39; W 49–43; W 55–43; W 73–50; L 35–59
2008	#2	First Round; Second Round; Sweet Sixteen; Elite Eight; Final Four	#15 Jackson State #7 Marist #3 Oklahoma State #1 North Carolina #1 Tennessee	W 66–32; W 68–49; W 67–52; W 56–50; L 46–47
2009	#6	First Round; Second Round	#11 Green Bay #3 Louisville	W 69–59; L 52–62
2010	#7	First Round; Second Round	#10 Hartford #2 Duke	W 60–39; L 52–60
2012	#5	First Round; Second Round	#12 San Diego State #4 Penn State	W 64–56; L 80–90
2013	#6	First Round; Second Round; Sweet Sixteen	#11 Green Bay #3 Penn State #2 California	W 75–71; W 71–66; L 63–73
2014	#7	First Round; Second Round; Sweet Sixteen	#10 Georgia Tech #2 West Virginia #3 Louisville	W 98–78; W 76–67; L 47–73
2015	#11	First Round	#6 South Florida	L 64–73
2017	#8	First Round	#9 California	L 52–55
2018	#6	First Round	#11 Central Michigan	L 69–78
2022	#3	First Round; Second Round	#14 Jackson State #6 Ohio State	W 83–77; L 64–79
2023	#3	First Round; Second Round; Sweet Sixteen; Elite Eight; Final Four; National Championship	#14 Hawai'i #6 Michigan #2 Utah #9 Miami (FL) #1 Virginia Tech #2 Iowa	W 73–50; W 66–42; W 66–63; W 54–42; W 79–72; W 102–85
2024	#3	First Round; Second Round; Sweet Sixteen; Elite Eight	#14 Rice #11 Middle Tennessee #2 UCLA #1 Iowa	W 70–60; W 83–56; W 78–69; L 87–94
2025	#3	First Round; Second Round; Sweet Sixteen; Elite Eight	#14 San Diego State #6 Florida State #2 NC State #1 UCLA	W 103–48; W 101–71; W 80–73; L 65–72
2026	#2	First Round; Second Round; Sweet Sixteen	#15 Jacksonville #7 Texas Tech #3 Duke	W 116–58; W 101–47; L 85–87

=== AIAW Division I ===
The Lady Tigers made one appearance in the AIAW National Division I basketball tournament, with a combined record of 3–1.

Year	Round	Opponent	Result
1977	First Round; Quarterfinals; Semifinals; National Championship	Western Washington; Baylor; Immaculata; Delta State	W 91–53; W 71–64; W 74–68; L, 55–68

== Player awards ==
=== National awards ===
- NCAA basketball tournament Most Outstanding Player

Angel Reese - 2023

- John R. Wooden Award

Seimone Augustus - 2005, 2006

- Naismith College Player of the Year

Seimone Augustus - 2005, 2006

- Associated Press Women's College Basketball Player of the Year

Seimone Augustus - 2005, 2006

- Nancy Lieberman Award

Temeka Johnson - 2005

- Katrina McClain Award

Aneesah Morrow - 2025

- Senior CLASS Award

Seimone Augustus - 2006

- USBWA National Freshman of the Year

Seimone Augustus - 2003

- Wade Trophy

Seimone Augustus - 2005, 2006

=== SEC Awards ===
- Player of the Year Award

Seimone Augustus - 2005, 2006
Sylvia Fowles - 2008
Angel Reese - 2024

== Prominent players ==
=== Retired numbers ===
No.	Member	Position	Career	Year No. Retired
33	Seimone Augustus	SG	2002–2006	2010
34	Sylvia Fowles	C	2004–2008	2017

== Arena ==
=== Pete Maravich Assembly Center ===
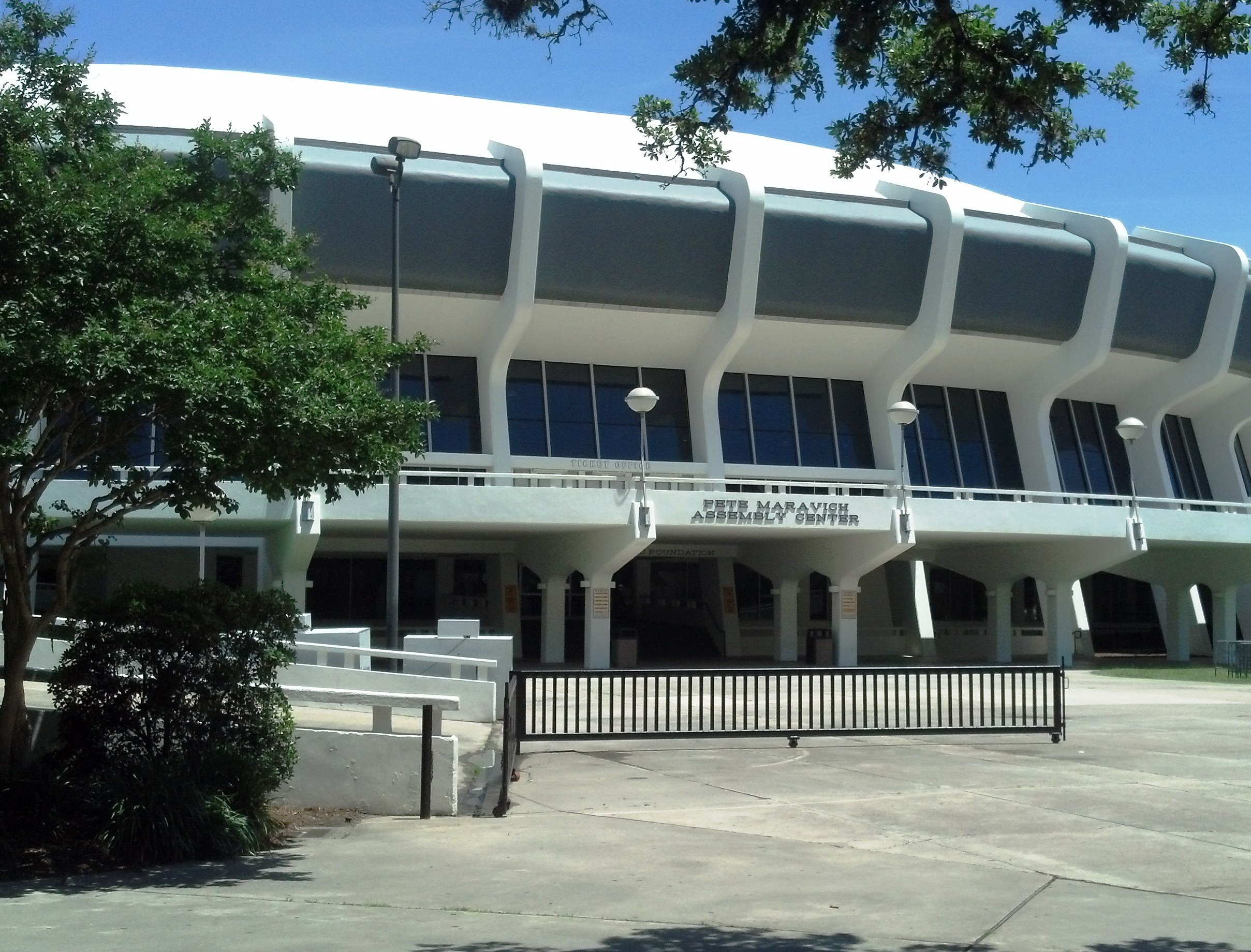
Pete Maravich Assembly Center

The Pete Maravich Assembly Center is a 13,215-seat multi-purpose arena in Baton Rouge, Louisiana. The arena opened in 1972 and is home of the LSU Lady Tigers basketball team. It was originally known as the LSU Assembly Center, but was renamed in honor of Pete Maravich, a Tiger basketball legend, shortly after his death in 1988. The Maravich Center is known to locals as "The PMAC" or "The Palace that Pete Built," or by its more nationally known nickname, "The Deaf Dome," coined by Dick Vitale.

The slightly oval building is located directly to the north of Tiger Stadium, and its bright-white roof can be seen in many telecasts of that stadium. The arena concourse is divided into four quadrants: Pete Maravich Pass, The Walk of Champions, Heroes Hall and Midway of Memories. The quadrants highlight former LSU Tiger athletes, individual and team awards and memorabilia pertaining to the history of LSU Lady Tigers and LSU Tigers basketball teams.

== Practice and Training facilities ==
=== LSU Basketball Practice Facility ===
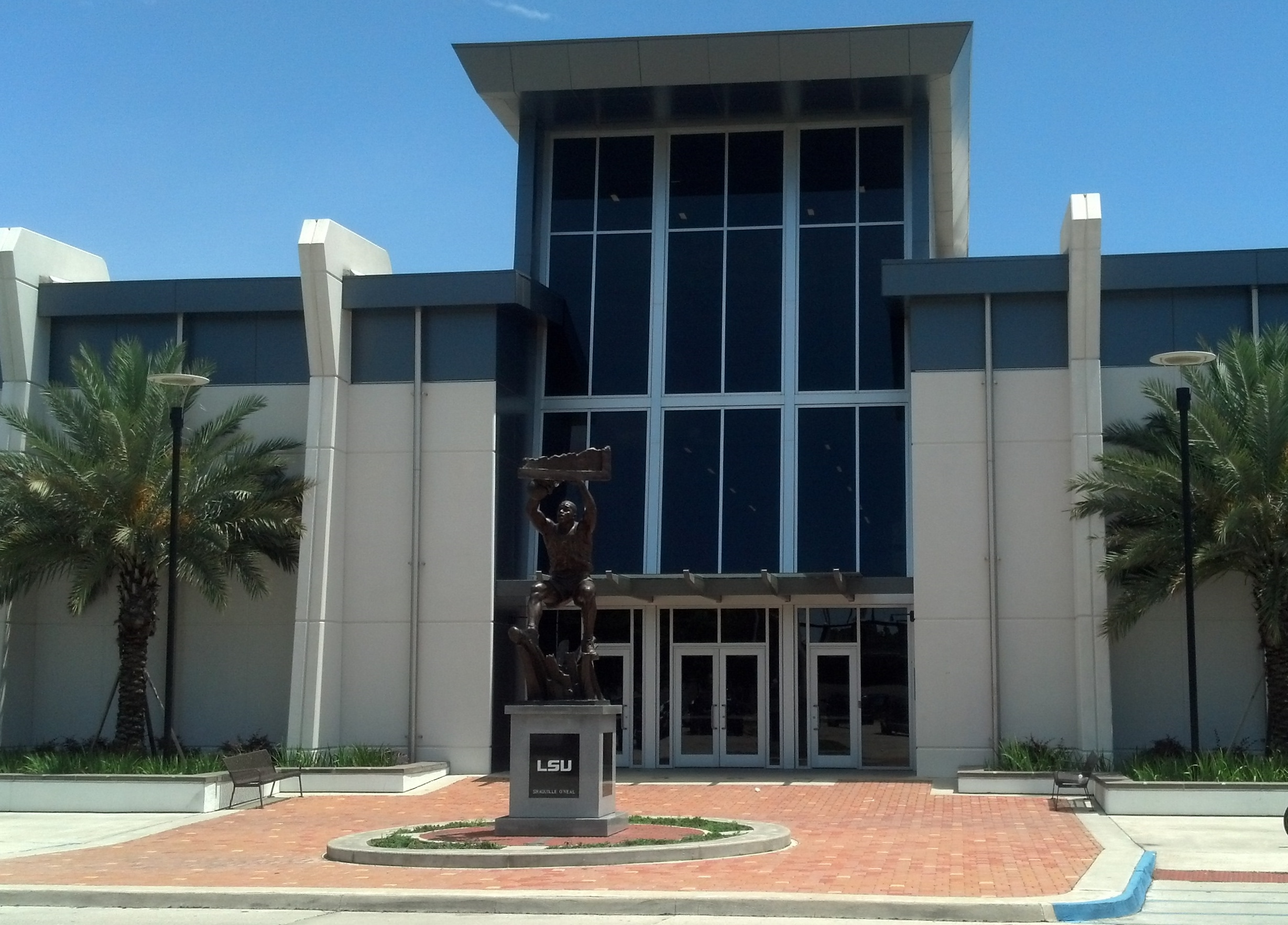
LSU Basketball Practice Facility

The LSU Basketball Practice Facility is the practice facility for the LSU Lady Tigers basketball and LSU Tigers basketball teams. The facility is connected to the Pete Maravich Assembly Center through the Northwest portal. The facility features separate, full-size duplicate gymnasiums for the women's and men's basketball teams. They include a regulation NCAA court in length with two regulation high school courts in the opposition direction. The courts are exact replicas of the Maravich Center game court and have two portable goals and four retractable goals. The gymnasiums are equipped with a scoreboard, video filming balcony and scorer's table with video and data connection. The facility also houses team locker rooms, a team lounge, training rooms, a coach's locker room and coach's offices.

The building also includes a two-story lobby and staircase that ascends to the second level where a club room is used for pre-game and post-game events and is connected to the Pete Maravich Assembly Center concourse. The lobby includes team displays and graphics, trophy cases and memorabilia of LSU basketball. A 900-pound bronze statue of LSU legend Shaquille O'Neal is located in front of the facility.

=== LSU Strength and Conditioning facility ===
The LSU Tigers basketball strength training and conditioning facility is located in the LSU Strength and Conditioning facility. Built in 1997, it is located adjacent to Tiger Stadium. Measuring 10,000-square feet with a flat surface, it has 28 multi-purpose power stations, 36 assorted sectorized machines and 10 dumbbell stations along with a plyometric specific area, medicine balls, hurdles, plyometric boxes and assorted speed and agility equipment. It also features 2 treadmills, 4 stationary bikes, 2 elliptical cross trainers, a stepper and step mill.

== Head coaches ==
Name	Years	Record	Pct.
Jinks Coleman	1975–1979	91–32	(.740)
Barbara Swanner	1979–1982	57–50	(.533)
Sue Gunter	1982–2004	442–221	(.667)
Pokey Chatman	2004–2007	90–14	(.865)
Bob Starkey (interim)	2007	4–1	(.800)
Van Chancellor	2007–2011	90–40	(.692)
Nikki Fargas	2011–2021	148–106	(.583)
Kim Mulkey	2021–present	91–14	(.867)
