= Littlejohn Coliseum =

Arena in Clemson, South Carolina

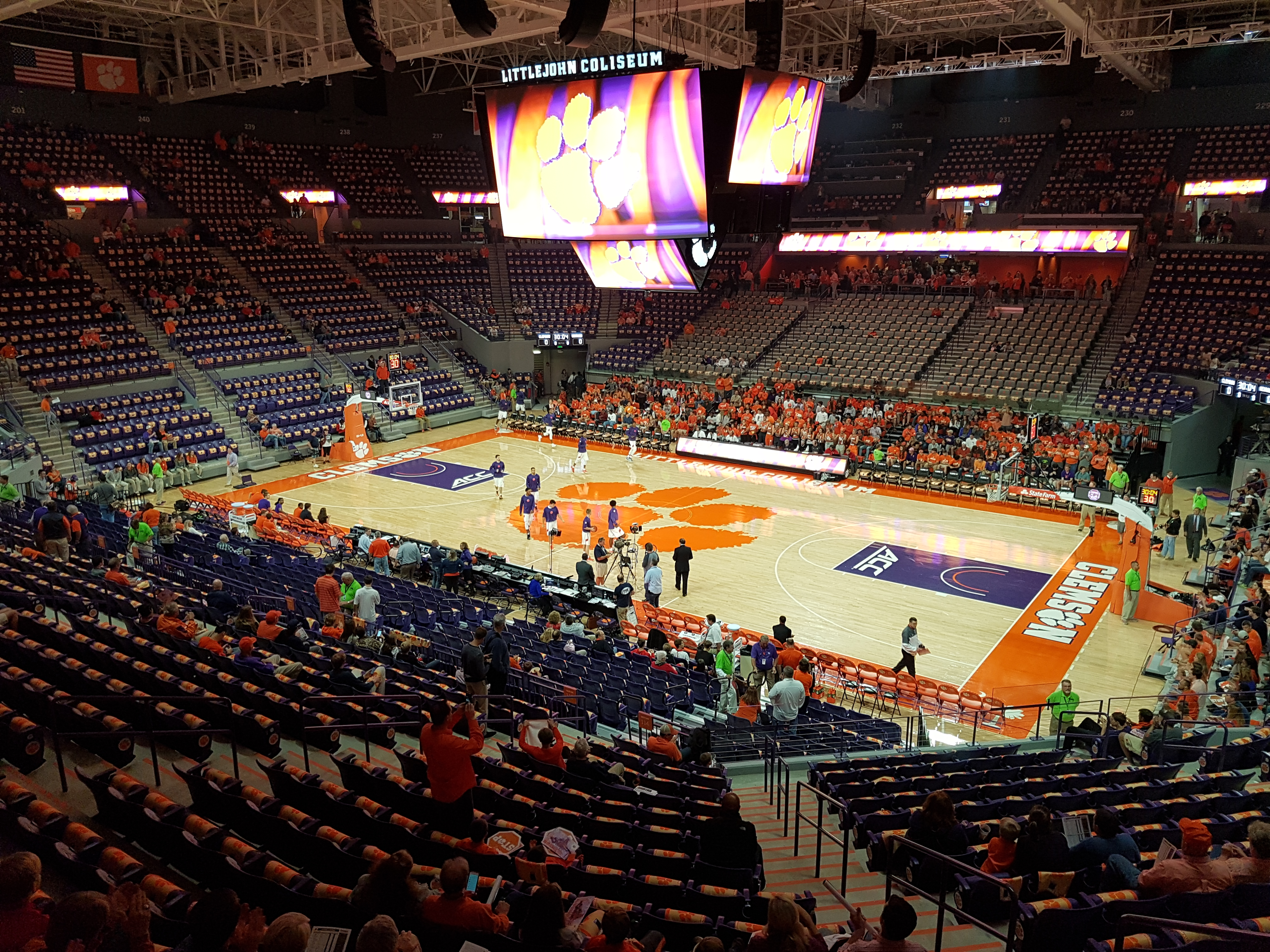
- Littlejohn Coliseum, Clemson, before the first official game in the renovated arena, vs Georgia
- Interactive map of Littlejohn Coliseum
- Location: Centennial Boulevard; Clemson, South Carolina, USA 29631
- Coordinates: 34°40′49″N 82°50′47″W
- Owner: Clemson University
- Operator: Clemson University
- Capacity: 9,000 (basketball); 8,400 (End Stage 360); 7,559 (End Stage 270); 6,584 (End Stage 230); 5,771 (End Stage 180); 4,375 (Side Stage)
- Surface: Hardwood

Construction
- Groundbreaking: December 13, 1966
- Opened: November 30, 1968
- Renovated: January 5, 2003; October 14, 2016
- Cost: $8 million ($74.1 million in 2025 dollars)
- Architects: J.E. Sirrine Company; HOK Sport (renovation)
- Structural engineer: Geiger Engineers (new roof for renovation)
- General contractor: Cecil's Inc.

Tenants
- Clemson Tigers; Men's basketball (1968–2002, 2003–2015, 2016–present); Women's basketball (1975–2002, 2003–2015, 2016–present); Gymnastics (2024–present) (NCAA)

The Littlejohn Coliseum is a 9,000-seat multi-purpose arena in Clemson, South Carolina, United States. It is home to the Clemson Tigers men's and women's basketball teams and women's gymnastics team. It is also the site of Clemson graduations and the Clemson Career Fair. It is owned and operated by Clemson University and hosts more than 150 events per year including concerts, trade shows, galas, and sporting events.

== History ==
Littlejohn Coliseum was first opened in 1968. Littlejohn was named after James C. Littlejohn, class of 1908, who was Clemson’s first business manager and was involved in the building of various other athletic projects, such as Memorial Stadium. Along with basketball, the Coliseum has hosted concerts by Rod Stewart, Huey Lewis & The News, John Cougar Mellencamp, Ozzy Osbourne, David Lee Roth, and many others.

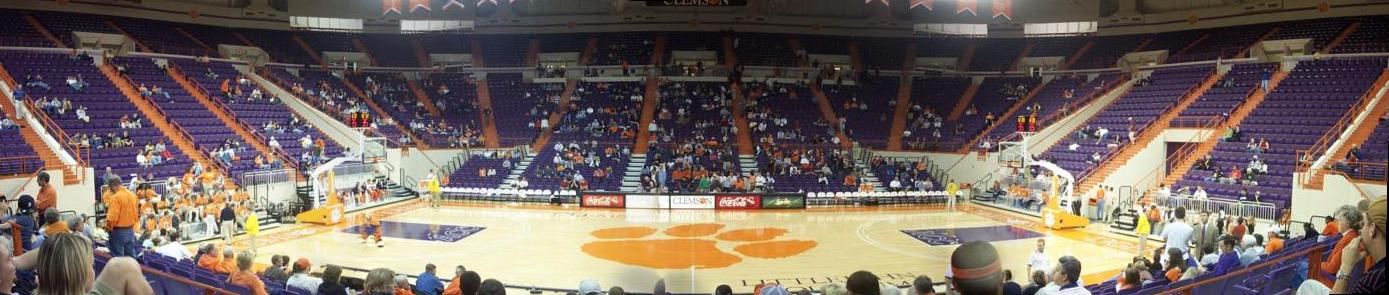
Littlejohn Coliseum from the inside (2003-2015 configuration)

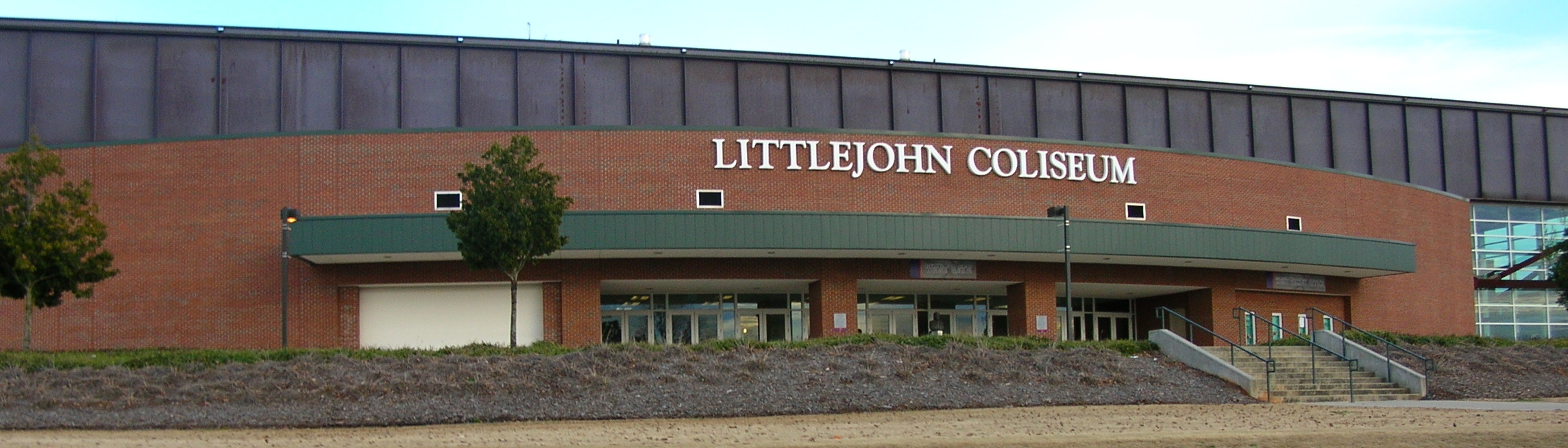
Littlejohn Coliseum from the outside

Renovations were done in the winter of 2002 that saw the Clemson teams play at Civic Center of Anderson for November and December of that year. In 2011, Clemson announced a $50 million athletic building plan. As a part of this plan, Littlejohn Coliseum was renovated. An additional practice facility was built at the southwest corner of Littlejohn Coliseum. Cost for the project was estimated at $5 million. The renovation was completed with an opening ceremony on October 14, 2016. The construction project cost a total of $63.5 million. The renovated studio included the new Swann Pavilion, which includes a 13,000-square-foot (1,200 m^{2}) practice gym, team suites, a film room, weight room and lounges. The renovation also upgraded the stadium entrance, exterior, and added two new LED boards. To fit in the new facilities, the basketball floor was rotated 90 degrees, and the arena capacity was reduced to 9,000 seats.

== See also ==
- List of NCAA Division I basketball arenas
