= 2002–03 NCAA Division I women's basketball rankings =

- Season: 2002–03
- NCAA Tournament: 2003
- Preseason No. 1: Duke
- NCAA Tournament Champions: Connecticut
NCAA Division I women's basketball rankings


Two human polls comprise the 2002–03 NCAA Division I women's basketball rankings, the AP Poll and the Coaches Poll, in addition to various publications' preseason polls. The AP poll is currently a poll of sportswriters, while the USA Today Coaches' Poll is a poll of college coaches. The AP conducts polls weekly through the end of the regular season and conference play, while the Coaches poll conducts a final, post-NCAA tournament poll as well.

== Legend ==
–	No votes
(#)	Ranking

== AP Poll ==
Team	10-Nov	18-Nov	25-Nov	2-Dec	9-Dec	16-Dec	23-Dec	30-Dec	6-Jan	13-Jan	20-Jan	27-Jan	3-Feb	10-Feb	17-Feb	24-Feb	3-Mar	10-Mar	17-Mar
UConn	4	6	5	3	3	3	3	3	3	3	2	2	1	1	1	1	1	1	1
Duke	1	1	1	1	1	1	1	1	1	1	1	1	2	2	2	2	2	2	2
LSU	3	3	3	2	2	2	2	2	2	2	6	5	4	4	4	4	6T	3	3
Tennessee	2	2	4	4	4	4	5	5	5	5	4	4	3	3	3	3	3	4	4
Texas	11	12	16	17	23	22	15	17	20	20	17	11	11	11	10	10	5	5	5
Louisiana Tech	16	10	15	15	17	17	16	14	12	11	11	9	9	10	7	6	6T	6	6
Texas Tech	7	13	12	10	10	9	8	8	8	7	7	8	T7	7	8	7	8	8	7
Kansas St.	5	4	2	7	7	7	4	4	4	4	3	3	5	5	5	5	4	7	8
Stanford	6	5	7	5	5	5	6	6	6	6	5	6	6	6	9	9	9	9	9
Purdue	8	7	6	6	6	6	7	7	7	9	12	10	10	9	11	11	12	10	10
Villanova	–	–	–	–	–	–	–	24	22	19	20	20	22	19	20	18	20	18	11
North Carolina	13	15	11	16	14	13	13	11	10	8	9	7	T7	8	6	8	11	11	12
Mississippi St.	24	20	19	20	16	14	14	18	T14	15	14	13	12	16	14	12	10	12	13
Vanderbilt	12	11	9	8	9	8	9	12	T14	17	18	17	18	18	18	17	15	13	14
Penn St.	14	14	13	11	11	16	17	15	17	13	13	14	13	12	12	15	14	14	15
South Carolina	–	–	–	23	18	18	18	16	13	14	15	16	16	15	17	16	16	16	16
Minnesota	15	16	14	12	12	11	11	10	9	12	10	15	15	17	16	13	13	15	17
UC Santa Barbara	25	25	24	–	–	–	22	22	21	18	21	22	19	20	19	19	19	17	18
Georgia	9	8	8	14	20	20	24	–	–	–	24	18	17	14	13	14	17	19	19
Ohio St.	–	–	–	–	–	–	–	–	23	–	–	23	25	22	–	–	–	22	20
Green Bay	–	–	–	–	–	25	23	21	19	16	16	21	21	21	21	22	21	20	21
Arizona	–	–	–	21	19	23	21	20	18	22	19	24	–	24	25	24	22	21	22
Rutgers	–	–	–	–	–	–	–	–	–	–	23	–	–	23	22	20	18	23	23
Arkansas	17	17	17	13	13	10	10	9	11	10	8	12	14	13	15	21	23	24	24
BYU	–	–	22	19	22	24	–	–	–	–	–	–	–	–	–	–	–	–	–
Cincinnati	18	18	25	25	25	–	–	–	–	–	–	–	–	–	–	–	–	–	–
Colorado	–	–	–	–	–	–	–	25	24	–	–	–	–	–	–	–	–	–	–
Colorado St.	19	24	–	–	–	–	–	–	–	–	–	–	–	–	–	–	–	–	–
DePaul	–	–	–	–	–	–	–	–	–	25	25	–	–	–	–	–	–	–	–
Iowa St.	23	22	20	–	–	–	–	–	–	–	–	–	–	–	–	–	–	–	–
Michigan	–	–	–	–	–	–	25	–	–	–	–	–	–	–	–	–	–	–	–
Notre Dame	10	9	10	9	8	12	12	13	16	21	–	–	–	–	–	–	–	–	–
Oklahoma	22	23	23	18	15	15	19	19	25	23	22	19	24	–	–	–	–	–	–
Washington	–	–	–	–	–	–	–	–	–	–	–	25	20	–	23	25	25	–	–
Boston College	20	19	18	22	21	19	20	23	–	24	–	–	23	25	24	23	24	25	T25
George Washington	21	21	21	24	24	21	–	–	–	–	–	–	–	–	–	–	–	–	T25

== USA Today Coaches poll ==
Team	PS	25-Nov	2-Dec	9-Dec	16-Dec	23-Dec	30-Dec	6-Jan	13-Jan	20-Jan	27-Jan	3-Feb	10-Feb	17-Feb	24-Feb	3-Mar	10-Mar	17-Mar	9-Apr
UConn	5	4	2	2	2	2	2	2	2	2	2	1	1	1	1	1	1	2	1
Tennessee	2	5	5	5	4	5	5	5	5	4	4	3	3	3	3	3	4	4	2
Texas	11	16	16	21	21	15	18	20	18	16	13	12	11	11	10	7	7	5	3
Duke	1	1	1	1	1	1	1	1	1	1	1	2	2	2	2	2	2	1	4
LSU	4	3	3	3	3	3	3	3	3	6	5	4	4	4	4	5	3	3	5
Texas Tech	13	11	10	10	10	10	9	8	7	7	8	8	8	9	8	10	9	8	6
Purdue	7	6	6	6	6	6	6	7	8	11	9	9	9	10	12	12	11	10	7
Villanova	–	–	–	–	–	–	–	–	25	24	21	22	20	20	17	18	14	12	8
Louisiana Tech	10	14	13	16	17	17	15	13	12	12	10	10	10	7	6	6	6	6	9
Kansas St.	3	2	7	7	7	4	4	4	4	3	3	5	5	5	5	4	5	7	10
Georgia	9	9	17	20	20	22	–	–	–	–	20	18	16	16	16	19	19	20	11
Penn St.	14	13	12	12	15	16	14	16	15	15	15	14	12	13	15	15	16	16	12
Minnesota	17	17	14	13	12	11	10	11	11	10	14	16	18	17	14	14	18	18	13
Stanford	6	7	4	4	5	7	7	5	5	5	7	7	6	8	9	8	8	9	14
North Carolina	15	12	15	14	13	13	12	9	10	9	6	6	7	6	7	9	10	11	15
Mississippi St.	23	19	19	15	14	14	17	15	14	13	12	11	14	12	11	11	12	13	16
Boston College	20	19	20	18	18	19	22	24	22	25	25	20	22	22	21	23	–	–	17
South Carolina	–	–	22	19	19	18	16	12	13	14	16	15	15	15	13	13	13	15	18
Colorado	–	–	–	–	–	–	25	23	–	–	–	–	–	–	–	–	–	–	19
Vanderbilt	8	8	8	9	8	8	11	14	16	17	17	19	19	19	18	16	15	14	20
Notre Dame	12	10	9	8	11	12	13	17	20	23	24	–	–	–	–	–	–	–	21
UC Santa Barbara	–	–	–	–	–	23	23	21	19	21	19	17	17	18	19	17	17	17	22
New Mexico	–	–	–	–	25	–	–	–	–	–	–	–	–	–	–	–	–	–	23
Green Bay	–	–	–	–	–	24	21	19	17	18	23	23	21	21	22	22	21	19	24
Arkansas	16	15	11	11	9	9	8	10	9	7	11	13	13	14	19	21	20	21	25
Arizona	–	–	–	24	24	21	20	18	21	19	22	25	23	24	24	24	22	22	–
BYU	–	–	22	23	23	–	–	–	–	–	–	–	–	–	–	–	–	–	–
Cincinnati	21	25	–	25	–	–	–	–	–	–	–	–	–	–	–	–	–	–	–
Colorado St.	24	–	–	–	–	–	–	–	–	–	–	–	–	–	–	–	–	–	–
DePaul	–	–	–	–	–	25	24	25	24	20	–	–	–	–	–	–	–	–	–
George Washington	–	24	21	22	22	–	–	–	–	–	–	–	–	–	–	–	–	25	–
Iowa St.	18	18	24	–	–	–	–	–	–	–	–	–	–	–	–	–	–	–	–
Liberty	–	–	–	–	–	–	–	–	–	–	–	–	–	–	–	–	25	–	–
Ohio St.	–	–	–	–	–	–	–	–	–	–	–	–	24	–	–	–	24	23	–
Oklahoma	25	22	18	17	16	20	19	22	23	22	18	21	–	–	–	–	–	–	–
Old Dominion	22	–	–	–	–	–	–	–	–	–	–	–	–	–	–	–	–	–	–
Rutgers	–	–	–	–	–	–	–	–	–	–	–	–	25	23	23	20	23	24	–
TCU	19	21	25	–	–	–	–	–	–	–	–	–	–	–	–	–	–	–	–
Utah	–	–	–	–	–	–	–	–	–	–	–	–	–	–	25	25	–	–	–
Virginia	–	23	–	–	–	–	–	–	–	–	–	–	–	–	–	–	–	–	–
Washington	–	–	–	–	–	–	–	–	–	–	–	24	–	25	–	–	–	–	–
