= 2003 NCAA Division I women's basketball tournament =

American college basketball tournament

- Teams: 64
- Finals site: Georgia Dome, Atlanta, Georgia
- Champions: Connecticut Huskies (4th title, 4th title game, 7th Final Four)
- Runner-up: Tennessee Volunteers (10th title game, 14th Final Four)
- Semifinalists: Texas Longhorns (3rd Final Four); Duke Blue Devils (3rd Final Four)
- Winning coach: Geno Auriemma (4th title)
- MOP: Diana Taurasi (Connecticut)
- Attendance: 334,587

The 2003 NCAA Division I women's basketball tournament began on March 22, 2003, and concluded on April 8, 2003, when the Connecticut Huskies (UConn) won their second straight national title. The Final Four was held at the Georgia Dome in Atlanta, Georgia on April 6–8, 2003. UConn, coached by Geno Auriemma, defeated archrival Tennessee, coached by Pat Summitt, 73–68 in the championship game. UConn's Diana Taurasi was named Most Outstanding Player.

This was the first year of a new format, in which the final game is held on the Tuesday following the men's championship, in contrast to prior years, when it was held on Sunday evening, between the men's semi-final and final. The game now is the final game of the Division 1 collegiate basketball season.

== Tournament records ==
- Rebounds – Connecticut recorded 22 rebounds in the Championship game against Tennessee, setting the record for fewest rebounds in an NCAA tournament Championship game.
- Free throws – Villanova attempted zero free throws in the Mideast Regional final game against Tennessee, one of only two times a team has attempted zero free throws in an NCAA Regional game
- Three-point field goals made – Diana Taurasi made 20 three-point field goals, tying the record for most three-point field goals in an NCAA tournament
- Free throws – Tennessee completed 128 free throws, setting the record for made free throws in an NCAA tournament

== Qualifying teams – automatic ==
Sixty-four teams were selected to participate in the 2003 NCAA Tournament. Thirty-one conferences were eligible for an automatic bid to the 2003 NCAA tournament.

Automatic bids
		Record		
Qualifying school	Conference	Regular Season	Conference	Seed
Alabama State University	SWAC	20–10	15–3	16
Austin Peay State University	Ohio Valley Conference	27–3	16–0	14
Boston University	America East	16–14	10–6	16
University of Tennessee at Chattanooga	Southern Conference	26–4	16–2	12
Duke University	ACC	31–1	16–0	1
The George Washington University	Atlantic 10	24–6	15–1	7
Georgia State University	Atlantic Sun Conference	20–10	12–4	16
University of Wisconsin–Green Bay	Horizon League	27–3	15–1	8
Hampton University	MEAC	23–8	16–1	15
Harvard University	Ivy League	22–4	14–0	14
College of the Holy Cross	Patriot League	24–7	13–1	13
Liberty University	Big South Conference	26–3	14–0	13
Louisiana Tech University	WAC	29–2	18–0	5
Louisiana State University	SEC	27–3	11–3	1
Manhattan College	MAAC	20–9	15–3	14
Missouri State University	Missouri Valley Conference	18–12	11–7	15
University of New Mexico	Mountain West	22–8	9–5	6
Old Dominion University	Colonial	21–10	15–3	12
Pepperdine University	West Coast Conference	22–7	12–2	12
Purdue University	Big Ten	26–5	12–4	2
St. Francis (PA)	Northeast Conference	23–7	16–2	15
Stanford University	Pac-10	26–4	15–3	3
Texas Christian University	Conference USA	19–13	8–6	9
University of Texas at Austin	Big 12	25–5	15–1	2
Texas State University	Southland	18–13	14–6	16
University of California, Santa Barbara	Big West Conference	26–4	15–1	7
Valparaiso University	Mid-Continent	18–12	8–6	15
Villanova University	Big East	25–5	12–4	2
Weber State University	Big Sky Conference	21–8	11–3	13
Western Kentucky University	Sun Belt Conference	22–8	12–2	13
Western Michigan University	MAC	20–11	10–6	14

== Qualifying teams – at-large ==
Thirty-three additional teams were selected to complete the sixty-four invitations.

At-large Bids
		Record		
Qualifying school	Conference	Regular season	Conference	Seed
University of Arizona	Pacific-10	22–8	13–5	6
University of Arkansas	Southeastern	21–10	7–7	7
Boston College	Big East	20–8	12–4	5
Brigham Young University	Mountain West	19–11	8–6	11
University of North Carolina at Charlotte	Conference USA	21–8	12–2	12
University of Cincinnati	Conference USA	23–7	11–3	10
University of Colorado at Boulder	Big 12	22–7	11–5	6
University of Connecticut	Big East	31–1	16–0	1
DePaul University	Conference USA	22–9	10–4	9
University of Georgia	Southeastern	19–9	10–4	5
Georgia Institute of Technology	Atlantic Coast	20–10	8–8	10
University of Illinois at Urbana–Champaign	Big Ten	17–11	9–7	9
Kansas State University	Big 12	28–4	14–2	3
University of Miami	Big East	18–12	8–8	11
Michigan State University	Big Ten	17–11	10–6	8
University of Minnesota	Big Ten	23–5	12–4	6
Mississippi State University	Southeastern	23–7	10–4	3
University of North Carolina at Chapel Hill	Atlantic Coast	27–5	13–3	3
University of Notre Dame	Big East	19–10	10–6	11
Ohio State University	Big Ten	21–9	10–6	4
University of Oklahoma	Big 12	19–12	9–7	10
Pennsylvania State University	Big Ten	24–8	13–3	4
Rutgers University	Big East	20–7	13–3	4
University of South Carolina	Southeastern	22–7	9–5	5
University of Tennessee	Southeastern	28–4	14–0	1
Texas Tech University	Big 12	26–5	13–3	2
Tulane University	Conference USA	19–9	10–4	11
University of Utah	Mountain West	23–6	12–2	8
Vanderbilt University	Southeastern	21–9	9–5	4
University of Virginia	Atlantic Coast	16–13	9–7	8
Virginia Tech	Big East	21–9	10–6	7
University of Washington	Pacific-10	22–7	13–5	9
Xavier University	Atlantic 10	20–9	11–5	10

== Bids by conference ==
Thirty-one conferences earned an automatic bid. In twenty-two cases, the automatic bid was the only representative from the conference. Thirty-three additional at-large teams were selected from nine of the conferences.

Bids	Conference	Teams
7	Big East	Villanova, Boston College, Connecticut, Miami Fla., Notre Dame, Rutgers, Virginia Tech
7	Southeastern	LSU, Arkansas, Georgia, Mississippi St., South Carolina, Tennessee, Vanderbilt
6	Big Ten	Purdue, Illinois, Michigan St., Minnesota, Ohio St., Penn St.
5	Big 12	Texas, Colorado, Kansas St., Oklahoma, Texas Tech
5	Conference USA	TCU, Charlotte, Cincinnati, DePaul, Tulane
4	Atlantic Coast	Duke, Georgia Tech, North Carolina, Virginia
3	Mountain West	New Mexico, BYU, Utah
3	Pacific-10	Stanford, Arizona, Washington
2	Atlantic 10	George Washington, Xavier
1	America East	Boston U.
1	Atlantic Sun	Georgia St.
1	Big Sky	Weber St.
1	Big South	Liberty
1	Big West	UC Santa Barb.
1	Colonial	Old Dominion
1	Horizon	Green Bay
1	Ivy	Harvard
1	Metro Atlantic	Manhattan
1	Mid-American	Western Mich.
1	Mid-Continent	Valparaiso
1	Mid-Eastern	Hampton
1	Missouri Valley	Missouri St.
1	Northeast	St. Francis Pa.
1	Ohio Valley	Austin Peay
1	Patriot	Holy Cross
1	Southern	Chattanooga
1	Southland	Texas St.
1	Southwestern	Alabama St.
1	Sun Belt	Western Ky.
1	West Coast	Pepperdine
1	Western Athletic	Louisiana Tech

== 2003 NCAA tournament schedule and venues ==
2003 NCAA NCAA first and second round venues
2003 NCAA regionals and Final Four

In 2003, the field remained at 64 teams. The teams were seeded, and assigned to four geographic regions, with seeds 1–16 in each region. In Round 1, seeds 1 and 16 faced each other, as well as seeds 2 and 15, seeds 3 and 14, seeds 4 and 13, seeds 5 and 12, seeds 6 and 11, seeds 7 and 10, and seeds 8 and 9. In 2003, a change was implemented in the way first and second round sites were determined. From 1982 (the year of the first NCAA women's basketball tournament) through 2002, the first rounds sites were offered to the top seeds. Starting in 2003, sixteen sites for the first two rounds were determined approximately a year before the team selections and seedings were completed.

First and Second rounds

The following lists the region, host school, venue and the sixteen first and second round locations:

- March 22 and 24
  - East Region
    - Mackey Arena, West Lafayette, Indiana (Host: Purdue University)
    - Ted Constant Convocation Center, Norfolk, Virginia (Host: Old Dominion University)
  - Mideast Region
    - Thompson–Boling Arena, Knoxville, Tennessee (Host: University of Tennessee)
    - CU Events Center, Boulder, Colorado (Host: University of Colorado Boulder)
  - Midwest Region
    - Stegeman Coliseum, Athens, Georgia (Host: University of Georgia)
    - The Pit, Albuquerque, New Mexico (Host: University of New Mexico)
  - West Region
    - McArthur Court, Eugene, Oregon (Host: University of Oregon)
    - Maples Pavilion, Stanford, California (Host: Stanford University)
- March 23 and 25
  - East Region
    - Harry A. Gampel Pavilion, Storrs, Connecticut (Host: University of Connecticut)
    - Bramlage Coliseum, Manhattan, Kansas (Host: Kansas State University)
  - Mideast Region
    - Lloyd Noble Center, Norman, Oklahoma (Host: University of Oklahoma)
    - Bryce Jordan Center, State College, Pennsylvania (Host: Pennsylvania State University)
  - Midwest Region
    - Reynolds Coliseum, Raleigh, North Carolina (Host: North Carolina State University)
    - United Spirit Arena, Lubbock, Texas (Host: Texas Tech University)
  - West Region
    - Shoemaker Center, Cincinnati, Ohio (Host: University of Cincinnati)
    - Thomas Assembly Center, Ruston, Louisiana (Host: Louisiana Tech University)

Regional semifinals and finals

The Regionals, named for the general location, were held from March 29 to April 1 at these sites:

- March 29 and 31
  - Mideast Regional, Thompson–Boling Arena, Knoxville, Tennessee (Host: University of Tennessee)
  - Midwest Regional, The Pit, Albuquerque, New Mexico (Host: University of New Mexico)
- March 30 and April 1
  - East Regional, University of Dayton Arena, Dayton, Ohio (Host: University of Dayton)
  - West Regional, Maples Pavilion, Stanford, California (Host: Stanford University)

Each regional winner advanced to the Final Four held April 6 and April 8 in Atlanta, Georgia at the Georgia Dome, (Host: Georgia Institute of Technology)

== Bids by state ==
The sixty-four teams came from thirty-two states, plus Washington, D.C. Virginia had the most teams with five bids. Eighteen states did not have any teams receiving bids.

NCAA Women's basketball Tournament invitations by state 2003

Bids	State	Teams
5	Virginia	Hampton, Liberty, Old Dominion, Virginia, Virginia Tech
4	Massachusetts	Boston U., Harvard, Holy Cross, Boston College
4	Tennessee	Austin Peay, Chattanooga, Tennessee, Vanderbilt
4	Texas	TCU, Texas, Texas St., Texas Tech
3	California	Pepperdine, Stanford, UC Santa Barb.
3	Georgia	Georgia St., Georgia, Georgia Tech
3	Indiana	Purdue, Valparaiso, Notre Dame
3	Louisiana	Louisiana Tech, LSU, Tulane
3	North Carolina	Duke, Charlotte, North Carolina
3	Ohio	Cincinnati, Ohio St., Xavier
3	Utah	Weber St., BYU, Utah
2	Illinois	DePaul, Illinois
2	Michigan	Western Mich., Michigan St.
2	New York	Manhattan, St. Francis Pa.
2	Pennsylvania	Villanova, Penn St.
1	Alabama	Alabama St.
1	Arizona	Arizona
1	Arkansas	Arkansas
1	Colorado	Colorado
1	Connecticut	Connecticut
1	District of Columbia	George Washington
1	Florida	Miami Fla.
1	Kansas	Kansas St.
1	Kentucky	Western Ky.
1	Minnesota	Minnesota
1	Mississippi	Mississippi St.
1	Missouri	Missouri St.
1	New Jersey	Rutgers
1	New Mexico	New Mexico
1	Oklahoma	Oklahoma
1	South Carolina	South Carolina
1	Washington	Washington
1	Wisconsin	Green Bay

== Brackets ==
Data Source

=== Mideast Region – Knoxville, Tennessee ===
First round March 22 and 23
1	Tennessee	95
16	Alabama State	43
Knoxville, Tennessee – Sat/Mon
8	Virginia	72
9	Illinois	56
5	South Carolina	68
12	UT-Chattanooga	54
State College, Pennsylvania – Sun/Tue
4	Penn State	64
13	Holy Cross	33
6	Colorado	84
11	BYU	45
Boulder, Colorado – Sat/Mon
3	North Carolina	72
14	Austin Peay	70
7	George Washington	71
10	Oklahoma	61
Norman, Oklahoma – Sun/Tue
2	Villanova	51
15	Saint Francis	36

Second round March 24 and 25
1	Tennessee	81
8	Virginia	51
5	South Carolina	67
4	Penn State	77
6	Colorado	86
3	North Carolina	67
7	George Washington	57
2	Villanova	70

Regional semifinals March 29
1	Tennessee	86
4	Penn State	58
6	Colorado	51
2	Villanova	53

Regional finals March 31
1	Tennessee	73
2	Villanova	49

=== Midwest Region – Albuquerque, New Mexico ===
First round March 22 and 23
1	Duke	66
16	Georgia State	48
Raleigh, North Carolina – Sun/Tue
8	Utah	73
9	DePaul	64
5	Georgia	80
12	Charlotte	61
Athens, Georgia – Sat/Mon
4	Rutgers	64
13	Western Kentucky	52
6	New Mexico	91
11	Miami (FL)	85
Albuquerque, New Mexico – Sat/Mon
3	Mississippi State	73
14	Manhattan	47
7	UC Santa Barbara	71
10	Xavier	62
Lubbock, Texas – Sun/Tue
2	Texas Tech	67
15	Missouri State	59

Second round March 24 and 25
1	Duke	65
8	Utah	54
5	Georgia	74
4	Rutgers	64
6	New Mexico	73
3	Mississippi State	61
7	UC Santa Barbara	68
2	Texas Tech	72

Regional semifinals March 29
1	Duke	66
5	Georgia	63
6	New Mexico	48
2	Texas Tech	71

Regional finals March 31
1	Duke	57
2	Texas Tech	51

=== East Region – Dayton, Ohio ===
First round March 22 and 23
1	Connecticut	91
16	Boston University	44
Storrs, Connecticut – Sun/Tue
8	Michigan State	47
9	TCU	50
5	Boston College	73
12	Old Dominion	72
Norfolk, Virginia – Sat/Mon
4	Vanderbilt	54
13	Liberty	44
6	Arizona	47
11	Notre Dame	59
Manhattan, Kansas – Sun/Tue
3	Kansas State	79
14	Harvard	69
7	Virginia Tech	61
10	Georgia Tech	59
West Lafayette, Indiana – Sat/Mon
2	Purdue	66
15	Valparaiso	51

Second round March 24 and 25
1	Connecticut	81
9	TCU	66
5	Boston College	86
4	Vanderbilt	85
11	Notre Dame	59
3	Kansas State	53
7	Virginia Tech	62
2	Purdue	80

Regional semifinals March 30
1	Connecticut	70
5	Boston College	49
11	Notre Dame	47
2	Purdue	66

Regional finals April 1
1	Connecticut	73
2	Purdue	64

=== West Region – Stanford, California ===
First round March 22 and 23
1	LSU	86
16	Texas State	50
Eugene, Oregon – Sat/Mon
8	Green Bay	78
9	Washington	65
5	Louisiana Tech	94
12	Pepperdine	60
Ruston, Louisiana – Sun/Tue
4	Ohio State	66
13	Weber State	44
6	Minnesota	68
11	Tulane	48
Stanford, California – Sat/Mon
3	Stanford	82
14	Western Michigan	66
7	Arkansas	71
10	Cincinnati	57
Cincinnati, Ohio – Sun/Tue
2	Texas	90
15	Hampton	46

Second round March 24 and 25
1	LSU	80
8	Green Bay	69
5	Louisiana Tech	74
4	Ohio State	61
6	Minnesota	68
3	Stanford	56
7	Arkansas	50
2	Texas	67

Regional semifinals March 30
1	LSU	69
5	Louisiana Tech	63
6	Minnesota	60
2	Texas	73

Regional finals April 1
1	LSU	60
2	Texas	78

=== Final Four – Atlanta, Georgia ===
National semifinals April 6
ME1	Tennessee	66
MW1	Duke	56
E1	Connecticut	71
W2	Texas	69

National championship April 8
ME1	Tennessee	68
E1	Connecticut	73

E-East; ME-Mideast; MW-Midwest; W-West.

== Record by conference ==
Conference	# of Bids	Record	Win %	Round of 32	Sweet Sixteen	Elite Eight	Final Four	Championship Game
Big East	L	15–6	.714	L	L	2	1	1
Southeastern	7	14–7	.667	7	3	2	1	1
Big Ten	6	8–6	.571	4	3	1	0	0
Big 12	5	10–5	.667	4	3	2	1	0
Conference USA	5	1–5	.167	1	0	0	0	0
Atlantic Coast	4	6–4	.600	3	1	1	1	0
Mountain West	3	3–3	.500	2	1	0	0	0
Pacific-10	3	1–3	.250	1	0	0	0	0
Atlantic 10	2	1–2	.333	1	0	0	0	0
Western Athletic	1	2–1	.667	1	1	0	0	0
Big West	1	1–1	.500	1	0	0	0	0
Horizon	1	1–1	.500	1	0	0	0	0

Nineteen conferences went 0–1: America East, Atlantic Sun Conference, Big Sky Conference, Big South Conference, Colonial, Ivy League, MAAC, MAC, Mid-Continent, MEAC, Missouri Valley Conference, Northeast Conference, Ohio Valley Conference, Patriot League, Southern Conference, Southland, SWAC, Sun Belt Conference, and West Coast Conference

== All-Tournament team ==
- Diana Taurasi, Connecticut
- Ann Strother, Connecticut
- Alana Beard, Duke
- Gwen Jackson, Tennessee
- Kara Lawson, Tennessee

== Game officials ==
- Scott Yarbrough (semifinal)
- Joe Cunningham (semifinal)
- June Courteau (semifinal)
- Sally Bell (semifinal)
- Dee Kantner (semifinal)
- Eric Larson (semifinal)
- Wesley Dean (final)
- Melissa Barlow (final)
- Lisa Mattingly (final)

== See also ==
- NCAA Women's Division I Basketball Championship
- 2003 NCAA Division I men's basketball tournament
- 2003 NAIA Division I men's basketball tournament
