= 1990 NCAA Division I women's basketball championship game =

Women's basketball championship game

NCAA Division I women's basketball championship game
National championship game
Auburn Tigers	Stanford Cardinal
(28–6)	(31–1)
81	88
Head coach: Joe Ciampi	Head coach: Tara VanDerveer
- AP: 9
- Coaches: 8
- AP: 2
- Coaches: 2
	1st half	2nd half	Total
Auburn Tigers	41	40	81
Stanford Cardinal	41	47	88
- Date: April 1, 1990
- Venue: Thompson–Boling Arena, Knoxville, Tennessee
- MVP: Jennifer Azzi, Stanford
- Referees: Sally Bell and Art Bomengen
- Attendance: 16,595 (20,023 paid)

United States TV coverage
- Network: CBS
- Announcers: Tim Brant (play-by-play) and Mimi Griffin (analyst)

The 1990 NCAA Division I women's basketball championship game was the final game of the 1990 NCAA Division I women's basketball tournament. It determined the champion of the 1989–90 NCAA Division I women's basketball season and was contested by the Auburn Tigers and the Stanford Cardinal. The game was played on April 1, 1990, at Thompson–Boling Arena in Knoxville, Tennessee. After trailing 41–24 at halftime, No. 2 Stanford fought back to defeat No. 9 Auburn 88–81 to capture the program's first NCAA national championship. Jennifer Azzi was named the tournament's Most Outstanding Player.

== Participants ==
=== Auburn Tigers ===
The Tigers, who represented the Auburn University in Auburn, Alabama, were led by head coach Joe Ciampi in his 10th season at the school. Auburn began the season ranked No. 7 in the AP Poll. After spending most of the previous season in the top 3, Auburn spent more than half of this campaign outside the top 10, but finished the regular season at No. 9.

Playing as the No. 2 seed in the Mideast region of the NCAA tournament, the Lady Tigers defeated Tennessee Tech, Vanderbilt, and No. 1 seed Washington to reach their third straight Final Four. Auburn defeated No. 1 Louisiana Tech for the second straight season in the National semifinals, 81–69. The 28–6 Tigers entered the matchup with No. 2 Stanford as the underdog.

=== Stanford Cardinal ===
The Cardinal, who represented the Stanford University in Palo Alto, California, were led by head coach Tara VanDerveer, in her 5th season as head coach at the school. After losing to eventual champion Louisiana Tech in the Final Four the prior season, Stanford opened this season ranked No. 3 in the AP poll and spent the entirety of the season ranked No. 2 or 3. After opening the season with 20 consecutive wins, Stanford lost 81–78 at No. 7 Washington on February 10 and settled for a split of the Pac-10 championship with the Huskies.

In the NCAA tournament, Stanford easily defeated No. 16 Hawaii, No. 24 Ole Miss, and No. 22 Arkansas to reach the first NCAA Final Four in program history. They won 75–66 over No. 12 Virginia in the national semifinal to reach the National championship game with a 31–1 record.

== Starting lineups ==
Auburn	Position	Stanford
Carolyn Jones	G	Jennifer Azzi
Chantel Tremitiere	G	Sonja Henning
	C	Val Whiting
	F	Trisha Stevens
	F	Katy Steding

== Game summary ==
CBS

April 1, 1990

No. 9 Auburn Tigers 81, No. 2 Stanford Cardinal 88
Scoring by half: 41–41, 40–47
Pts: Rebs: Asts:	Pts: Henning 21; Rebs: Stevens 10; Asts:

Thompson–Boling Arena – Knoxville, Tennessee

== Media coverage ==
The game was broadcast on CBS.
