= 1989–90 Clemson Tigers women's basketball team =

Women's college basketball season

1989–90 Clemson Tigers women's basketball

NCAA Tournament, Sweet Sixteen
- Conference: Atlantic Coast Conference

Ranking
- Coaches: No. 19
- Record: 22–10 (10–4 ACC)
- Head coach: Jim Davis (3rd season)
- Home arena: Littlejohn Coliseum

1989–90 ACC women's basketball standings
	Conf.				Overall
Team	W		L	PCT	W		L	PCT
No. 11 NC State	12	–	2	.857	25	–	6	.806
No. 12 Virginia †	11	–	3	.786	29	–	6	.829
Clemson	10	–	4	.714	22	–	10	.688
Maryland	7	–	7	.500	19	–	11	.633
Wake Forest	5	–	9	.357	16	–	14	.533
Duke	4	–	10	.286	15	–	13	.536
Georgia Tech	4	–	10	.286	13	–	17	.433
North Carolina	3	–	11	.214	13	–	15	.464
† 1990 ACC tournament winner Rankings from AP poll

The 1989–90 Clemson Tigers women's basketball team represented Clemson University during the 1989–90 NCAA Division I women's basketball season. The Tigers were led by third year head coach Jim Davis. The Tigers, members of the Atlantic Coast Conference, played their home games at Littlejohn Coliseum.

== Schedule ==
Date time, TV	Rank^{#}	Opponent^{#}	Result	Record	Site city, state
November 24, 1989*		at DePaul; DePaul Invitational	L 65–87	0–1	Alumni Hall; Chicago, Illinois
November 25, 1989*		vs. San Diego State; DePaul Invitational	W 62–45	1–1	Alumni Hall; Chicago, Illinois
November 29, 1989*		Furman	W 84–49	2–1	Littlejohn Coliseum; Clemson, South Carolina
December 2, 1989*		College of Charleston	W 90–46	3–1	Littlejohn Coliseum; Clemson, South Carolina
December 6, 1989*		Augusta	W 79–52	4–1	Littlejohn Coliseum; Clemson, South Carolina
December 9, 1989*		at No. 17 South Carolina rivalry	L 64–82	4–2	Carolina Coliseum; Columbia, South Carolina
December 16, 1989*		UNC–Charlotte	W 66–56	5–2	Littlejohn Coliseum; Clemson, South Carolina
December 18, 1989*		Michigan State	W 75–64	6–2	Littlejohn Coliseum; Clemson, South Carolina
December 29, 1989*		at Brigham Young; Brigham Young Invitational	W 73–69	7–2	Marriott Center; Provo, Utah
December 30, 1989*		vs. Montana State; Brigham Young Invitational	W 80–53	8–2	Marriott Center; Provo, Utah
January 8, 1990*		No. 18 South Carolina rivalry	L 52–74	8–3	Littlejohn Coliseum; Clemson, South Carolina
January 13, 1990		Wake Forest	W 69–59	9–3 (1–0)	Littlejohn Coliseum; Clemson, South Carolina
January 16, 1990		No. 15 Maryland	W 72–60	10–3 (2–0)	Littlejohn Coliseum; Clemson, South Carolina
January 20, 1990		No. 12 NC State	L 64–72	10–4 (2–1)	Littlejohn Coliseum; Clemson, South Carolina
January 22, 1990*		Radford	W 78–77 ^{2OT}	11–4 (2–1)	Littlejohn Coliseum; Clemson, South Carolina
January 24, 1990		Georgia Tech	W 77–69	12–4 (3–1)	Littlejohn Coliseum; Clemson, South Carolina
January 27, 1990		North Carolina	W 80–66	13–4 (4–1)	Littlejohn Coliseum; Clemson, South Carolina
January 29, 1990		Duke	W 64–49	14–4 (5–1)	Littlejohn Coliseum; Clemson, South Carolina
January 31, 1990		at No. 12 Virginia	L 64–67	14–5 (5–2)	University Hall; Charlottesville, Virginia
February 2, 1990		at No. 23 Maryland	W 77–65	15–5 (6–2)	Cole Field House; College Park, Maryland
February 7, 1990*		No. 4 Georgia	L 52–75	15–6 (6–2)	Littlejohn Coliseum; Clemson, South Carolina
February 10, 1990		at Wake Forest	W 63–59	16–6 (7–2)	LJVM Coliseum; Winston-Salem, North Carolina
February 12, 1990		at Georgia Tech	W 80–75	17–6 (8–2)	Alexander Memorial Coliseum; Atlanta, Georgia
February 17, 1990		No. 10 Virginia	L 63–71	17–7 (8–3)	Littlejohn Coliseum; Clemson, South Carolina
February 21, 1990		at No. 9 NC State	L 81–82	17–8 (8–4)	Reynolds Coliseum; Raleigh, North Carolina
February 24, 1990		at North Carolina	W 80–79	18–8 (9–4)	Carmichael Arena; Chapel Hill, North Carolina
February 26, 1990		at Duke	W 65–60	19–8 (10–4)	Cameron Indoor Stadium; Durham, North Carolina
ACC Tournament
March 3, 1990*		vs. Duke; ACC Tournament quarterfinal	W 77–68	20–8 (10–4)	Civic Center; Fayetteville, North Carolina
March 4, 1990*		vs. No. 15 Virginia; ACC Tournament semifinal	L 66–84	20–9 (10–4)	Civic Center; Fayetteville, North Carolina
NCAA Tournament
March 14, 1990*		Manhattan; NCAA Tournament first round	W 79–55	21–9 (10–4)	Littlejohn Coliseum; Clemson, South Carolina
March 17, 1990*		at Connecticut; NCAA Tournament second round	W 61–59	22–9 (10–4)	Harry A. Gampel Pavilion; Storrs, Connecticut
March 22, 1990*		vs. No. 4 Tennessee; NCAA Tournament East Region semifinal	L 62–80	22–10 (10–4)	ODU Fieldhouse; Norfolk, Virginia
*Non-conference game. ^{#}Rankings from AP Poll. (#) Tournament seedings in parentheses.
