= 1990 SEC women's basketball tournament =

- Classification: Division I
- Teams: 10
- Site: Albany Civic Center; Albany, Georgia
- Champions: Auburn (3rd title)
- Winning coach: Joe Ciampi (3rd title)
- MVP: Carolyn Jones (Auburn)
- Attendance: 16,976

1989–90 SEC women's basketball standings
	Conf.				Overall
Team	W		L	PCT	W		L	PCT
No. 4 Tennessee	8	–	1	.889	27	–	6	.818
No. 9 Auburn^{†}	7	–	2	.778	28	–	7	.800
No. 24 Ole Miss	7	–	2	.778	22	–	10	.688
No. 7 Georgia	6	–	3	.667	25	–	5	.833
Vanderbilt	5	–	4	.556	23	–	11	.676
No. 23 LSU	4	–	5	.444	21	–	9	.700
Alabama	4	–	5	.444	16	–	12	.571
Kentucky	3	–	6	.333	23	–	8	.742
Florida	1	–	8	.111	15	–	13	.536
Mississippi State	0	–	9	.000	9	–	19	.321
† 1990 SEC tournament winner Rankings from AP poll

The 1990 Southeastern Conference women's basketball tournament was the postseason women's basketball tournament for the Southeastern Conference (SEC) held at the Albany Civic Center in Albany, Georgia, from March 2 – 5, 1990. The Auburn Tigers won the tournament and earned an automatic bid to the 1990 NCAA Division I women's basketball tournament. Auburn won the tournament by beating Tennessee in the championship game.

== Seeds ==
All teams in the conference participated in the tournament. Teams were seeded by their conference record.

Seed	School	Conference record	Overall record	Tiebreaker
1	Tennessee^{‡†}	8–1	27–6	
2	Auburn^{†}	7–2	28–7	
3	Ole Miss^{†}	7–2	22–10	
4	Georgia^{†}	6–3	25–5	
5	Vanderbilt	5–4	23–11	
6	Alabama	4–5	16–12	
7	LSU	4–5	21–9	
8	Kentucky	3–6	23–8	
9	Florida	1–8	15–13	
10	Mississippi State	0–9	9–19	
‡ – SEC regular season champions, and tournament No. 1 seed. † – Received a bye in the conference tournament. Overall records include all games played in the SEC Tournament.

== Schedule ==
Game	Matchup^{#}	Score
First Round – Fri, Mar 2
1	No. 8 Kentucky vs. No. 9 Florida	54–70
2	No. 7 LSU vs. No. 10 Mississippi State	68–49
Quarterfinal – Sat, Mar 3
3	No. 1 Tennessee vs. No. 9 Florida	81–56
4	No. 2 Auburn vs. No. 7 LSU	91–65
5	No. 3 Ole Miss vs. No. 6 Alabama	71–45
6	No. 4 Georgia vs. No. 5 Vanderbilt	79–72
Semifinal – Sun, Mar 4
7	No. 1 Tennessee vs. No. 4 Georgia	73–54
8	No. 2 Auburn vs. No. 3 Ole Miss	72–71
Championship – Mon, Mar 5
9	No. 1 Tennessee vs. No. 2 Auburn	77–78

== Bracket ==
First round Fri, Mar 2
8	Kentucky	54
9	Florida	70
7	LSU	68
10	Mississippi State	49

Quarterfinals; Sat, Mar 3
1	Tennessee	81
9	Florida	56
4	Georgia	79
5	Vanderbilt	72
2	Auburn	91
7	LSU	65
3	Ole Miss	71
6	Alabama	45

Semifinals; Sun, Mar 4
1	Tennessee	73
4	Georgia	54
2	Auburn*	72
3	Ole Miss	71

Championship; Mon, Mar 5
1	Tennessee	77
2	Auburn	78

Asterisk denotes game ended in overtime.

== All-Tournament team ==
- Carolyn Jones, Auburn (MVP)
- Dena Head, Tennessee
- Evelyn Thompson, Auburn
- Daedra Charles, Tennessee
- Lady Hardman, Georgia
