= 1989–90 Auburn Tigers women's basketball team =

Intercollegiate basketball season

1989–90 Auburn Tigers women's basketball

SEC tournament champions

NCAA tournament, Runner-up
- Conference: Southeastern Conference

Ranking
- Coaches: No. 2
- AP: No. 9
- Record: 28–7 (7–2 SEC)
- Head coach: Joe Ciampi (11th season)
- Assistant coach: Carol Ross
- Home arena: Joel H. Eaves Memorial Coliseum

1989–90 SEC women's basketball standings
	Conf.				Overall
Team	W		L	PCT	W		L	PCT
No. 4 Tennessee	8	–	1	.889	27	–	6	.818
No. 9 Auburn^{†}	7	–	2	.778	28	–	7	.800
No. 24 Ole Miss	7	–	2	.778	22	–	10	.688
No. 7 Georgia	6	–	3	.667	25	–	5	.833
Vanderbilt	5	–	4	.556	23	–	11	.676
No. 23 LSU	4	–	5	.444	21	–	9	.700
Alabama	4	–	5	.444	16	–	12	.571
Kentucky	3	–	6	.333	23	–	8	.742
Florida	1	–	8	.111	15	–	13	.536
Mississippi State	0	–	9	.000	9	–	19	.321
† 1990 SEC tournament winner Rankings from AP poll

The 1989–90 Auburn Tigers women's basketball team represented Auburn University during the 1989–90 NCAA Division I women's basketball season. The Tigers, led by 11th-year head coach Joe Ciampi, played their home games at Joel H. Eaves Memorial Coliseum as members of the Southeastern Conference. They finished the season 28–7, 7–2 in SEC play to finish one game behind Tennessee in the standings. They went on to win the SEC women's tournament. Auburn finished the regular season ranked No. 9 and was selected as the No. 2 seed in the Mideast regional of the NCAA tournament. They defeated Tennessee Tech, Vanderbilt, and Washington to reach the third Final Four in program history. The Lady Tigers then defeated No. 1 seed in the Midwest region, Louisiana Tech, to reach the National championship game once again. Auburn was defeated by the West region No. 1 seed Stanford, 88–81.

This season marked the third straight National runner-up finish for the Auburn women's basketball program. To date, these are the only three Final Four appearances in program history.

== Roster ==
1989–90 Auburn Tigers women's basketball team
Players
Coaches

Pos.	#	Name	Height	Year	Previous school	Hometown
G	5	Evelyn Thompson	5 ft 9 in (1.75 m)	Sr	LaGrange	LaGrange, GA
G	10	Chantel Tremitiere	5 ft 6 in (1.68 m)	Jr	William Penn	York, PA
G	21	Carolyn Jones	5 ft 9 in (1.75 m)	Jr	West Jones	Laurel, MS
F	42	Kendall Mago	6 ft 4 in (1.93 m)	So	Mount St. Mary Academy	Little Rock, AR
C	45	Linda Godby	6 ft 5 in (1.96 m)	Sr	Warren Central	Indianapolis, IN

Head coach

- Joe Ciampi (Mansfield State)

Assistant coach(es)

Legend

- (C) Team captain
- (S) Suspended
- (I) Ineligible
- (W) Walk-on
- Injured
- Current redshirt

Roster

== Schedule ==
Date time, TV	Rank^{#}	Opponent^{#}	Result	Record	Site (attendance) city, state
Regular season
Feb 3, 1990	No. 14	at No. 5 Tennessee	L 65–76	17–5 (4–1)	Thompson-Boling Arena; Knoxville, Tennessee
Feb 21, 1990	No. 11	at Alabama	L 68–71	20–6 (6–2)	Coleman Coliseum; Tuscaloosa, Alabama
Feb 24, 1990	No. 11	Kentucky	W 68–60	21–6 (7–2)	Eaves Memorial Coliseum; Auburn, Alabama
SEC Tournament
March 2, 1990*	(2) No. 12	vs. (7) No. 21 LSU; Quarterfinals	W 91–65	22–6	Albany Civic Center; Albany, Georgia
March 3, 1990*	(2) No. 12	vs. (3) Ole Miss; Semifinals	W 72–71 ^{OT}	23–6	Albany Civic Center; Albany, Georgia
March 4, 1990*	(2) No. 12	vs. (1) No. 3 Tennessee; Championship game	W 78–77	24–6	Albany Civic Center; Albany, Georgia
NCAA Tournament
Mar 17, 1990*	(2 ME) No. 9	vs. (7 ME) Tennessee Tech; Second round	W 73–54	25–6	Eaves Memorial Coliseum; Auburn, Alabama
Mar 22, 1990*	(2 ME) No. 9	vs. (6 ME) Vanderbilt; Regional Semifinal – Sweet Sixteen	W 89–67	26–6	Carver–Hawkeye Arena; Iowa City, Iowa
Mar 24, 1990*	(2 ME) No. 9	vs. (1 ME) No. 3 Washington; Regional Final – Elite Eight	W 76–50	27–6	Carver–Hawkeye Arena; Iowa City, Iowa
Mar 30, 1990*	(2 ME) No. 9	vs. (1 MW) No. 1 Louisiana Tech; National Semifinal – Final Four	W 81–69	28–6	Thompson-Boling Arena (19,467); Knoxville, Tennessee
Apr 1, 1990*	(2 ME) No. 9	vs. (1 W) No. 2 Stanford; National Championship	L 81–88	28–7	Thompson-Boling Arena (20,023); Knoxville, Tennessee
*Non-conference game. ^{#}Rankings from AP Poll. (#) Tournament seedings in parentheses. All times are in Central Time.

== Rankings ==
Ranking movements Legend: ██ Increase in ranking ██ Decrease in ranking
	Week																	
Poll	1	2	3	4	5	6	7	8	9	10	11	12	13	14	15	16	17	Final
AP	7	6	5	7	7	13	16	15	14	14	14	13	11	11	12	11	9	Not released
Coaches	6	5	5	7	7	13	16	15	14	14	14	13	10	10	11	10	8	2
