= 1990 ACC women's basketball tournament =

- Classification: Division I
- Teams: 8
- Site: Civic Center; Fayetteville, North Carolina
- Champions: Virginia (1st title)
- Winning coach: Debbie Ryan (1st title)
- MVP: Andrea Stinson (NC State)

1989–90 ACC women's basketball standings
	Conf.				Overall
Team	W		L	PCT	W		L	PCT
No. 11 NC State	12	–	2	.857	25	–	6	.806
No. 12 Virginia †	11	–	3	.786	29	–	6	.829
Clemson	10	–	4	.714	22	–	10	.688
Maryland	7	–	7	.500	19	–	11	.633
Wake Forest	5	–	9	.357	16	–	14	.533
Duke	4	–	10	.286	15	–	13	.536
Georgia Tech	4	–	10	.286	13	–	17	.433
North Carolina	3	–	11	.214	13	–	15	.464
† 1990 ACC tournament winner Rankings from AP poll

The 1990 Atlantic Coast Conference women's basketball tournament was the postseason women's basketball tournament for the Atlantic Coast Conference, held March 3–5, 1990, in Fayetteville, North Carolina, at the Civic Center.

== Bracket ==
Quarterfinals; Saturday, March 3
1	NC State	80
8	North Carolina	61
4	Maryland	87
5	Wake Forest	68
3	Clemson	77
6	Duke	68
2	Virginia	73
7	Georgia Tech	65

Semifinals; Sunday, March 4
1	NC State	66
4	Maryland	57
3	Clemson	66
2	Virginia	84

Championship game Monday, March 5
1	NC State	64
2	Virginia	67*

== Awards and honors ==
Tournament MVP: Andrea Stinson, NC State

All-Tournament teams:

First Team
- Andrea Stinson, NC State

Second Team

== See also ==
- 1990 ACC men's basketball tournament
