= 1989–90 Iowa Hawkeyes women's basketball team =

Intercollegiate basketball season

1989–90 Iowa Hawkeyes women's basketball

Big Ten Conference regular season co-champions

NCAA tournament, Second round
- Conference: Big Ten Conference

Ranking
- Coaches: No. 18
- AP: No. 10
- Record: 23–6 (15–3 Big Ten)
- Head coach: C. Vivian Stringer (7th season)
- Home arena: Carver–Hawkeye Arena

1989–90 Big Ten women's basketball standings
	Conf.				Overall
Team	W		L	PCT	W		L	PCT
No. 13 Northwestern	15	–	3	.833	24	–	5	.828
No. 10 Iowa	15	–	3	.833	23	–	6	.793
No. 15 Purdue	14	–	4	.778	23	–	7	.767
Michigan	11	–	7	.611	20	–	10	.667
Ohio State	11	–	7	.611	18	–	12	.600
Michigan State	7	–	11	.389	11	–	17	.393
Indiana	6	–	12	.333	12	–	16	.429
Illinois	5	–	13	.278	11	–	17	.393
Minnesota	3	–	15	.167	8	–	20	.286
Wisconsin	3	–	15	.167	8	–	20	.286
Rankings from AP Poll

The 1989–90 Iowa Hawkeyes women's basketball team represented the University of Iowa as members of the Big Ten Conference during the 1989–90 NCAA women's basketball season. The Hawkeyes, led by seventh-year head coach C. Vivian Stringer, played their home games in Iowa City, Iowa at Carver–Hawkeye Arena. They finished the season 23–6 overall, 15–3 in Big Ten play, sharing a piece of the conference championship for the fourth consecutive season. Iowa made its fifth straight appearance in the women's NCAA basketball tournament, but was upset in the second round.

== Roster ==
1989–90 Iowa Hawkeyes women's basketball team
Players
Coaches

Pos.	#	Name	Height	Year	Previous school	Hometown
G	10	Stephanie Schueler	5 ft 6 in (1.68 m)	Jr	Lincoln	Sioux Falls, SD
F	14	Felicia Hall	6 ft 2 in (1.88 m)	Jr	Green Oaks	Shreveport, LA
F	25	Franthea Price	5 ft 9 in (1.75 m)	Sr	River Rouge	River Rouge, MI
F	33	Jody Ratigan	5 ft 8 in (1.73 m)	Sr	Tri-Center	Neola, IA
G	34	Jolette Law	5 ft 3 in (1.6 m)	Sr	Wilson	Florence, SC
F	54	Toni Foster	6 ft 1 in (1.85 m)	Fr	Marshall	Chicago, IL
F/C		Katie Abrahamson	6 ft 2 in (1.88 m)	Jr	Washington	Cedar Rapids, IA

Head coach

- C. Vivian Stringer

Assistant coach(es)

- Jennifer Bednarek
- Marianna Freeman

Legend

- (C) Team captain
- (S) Suspended
- (I) Ineligible
- (W) Walk-on
- Injured
- Current redshirt

Roster

== Schedule and results ==
Date time, TV	Rank^{#}	Opponent^{#}	Result	Record	Site city, state
Regular season
Nov 25, 1989*	No. 11	Howard; Amana-Hawkeye Classic	W 90–57	1–0	Carver-Hawkeye Arena; Iowa City, Iowa
Nov 26, 1989*	No. 11	UConn; Amana-Hawkeye Classic	W 81–49	2–0	Carver-Hawkeye Arena; Iowa City, Iowa
Nov 27, 1989*	No. 10	at Nebraska	W 74–55	3–0	Bob Devaney Sports Center; Lincoln, Nebraska
Dec 1, 1989*	No. 10	vs. No. 21 Saint Joseph's; Louisiana Tech Dial Soap Classic	W 76–57	4–0	Thomas Assembly Center; Ruston, Louisiana
Dec 2, 1989*	No. 10	at No. 2 Louisiana Tech; Louisiana Tech Dial Soap Classic	L 82–85	4–1	Thomas Assembly Center; Ruston, Louisiana
Dec 8, 1989*	No. 7	DePaul	W 70–58	5–1	Carver-Hawkeye Arena; Iowa City, Iowa
Dec 10, 1989*	No. 7	Drake	W 70–58	6–1	Carver-Hawkeye Arena; Iowa City, Iowa
Dec 17, 1989*	No. 5	at Iowa State	W 75–55	7–1	Hilton Coliseum; Ames, Iowa
Dec 28, 1989*	No. 4	vs. No. 20 South Carolina; Hilton Head Island Super Shootout	L 76–82	7–2	Hilton Head, South Carolina
Dec 29, 1989*	No. 4	vs. North Carolina; Hilton Head Island Super Shootout	W 106–81	8–2	Hilton Head, South Carolina
Jan 5, 1990	No. 7	at Michigan State	L 61–62	8–3 (0–1)	Breslin Student Events Center; East Lansing, Michigan
Jan 7, 1990	No. 7	at Michigan	W 65–54	9–3 (1–1)	Crisler Arena; Ann Arbor, Michigan
Jan 12, 1990	No. 10	Illinois	W 85–51	10–3 (2–1)	Carver-Hawkeye Arena; Iowa City, Iowa
Jan 14, 1990	No. 10	No. 11 Purdue	L 63–66	10–4 (2–2)	Carver-Hawkeye Arena; Iowa City, Iowa
Jan 19, 1990	No. 13	at Minnesota	L 72–84	11–4 (3–2)	Williams Arena; Minneapolis, Minnesota
Jan 26, 1990	No. 13	at Indiana	W 63–52	12–4 (4–2)	Assembly Hall; Bloomington, Indiana
Jan 28, 1990	No. 13	at Ohio State	W 71–48	13–4 (5–2)	St. John Arena; Columbus, Ohio
Feb 2, 1990	No. 13	Wisconsin	W 84–52	14–4 (6–2)	Carver-Hawkeye Arena; Iowa City, Iowa
Feb 4, 1990	No. 13	No. 19 Northwestern	L 63–64	14–5 (6–3)	Carver-Hawkeye Arena; Iowa City, Iowa
Feb 9, 1990	No. 16	at Illinois	W 59–51	15–5 (7–3)	Assembly Hall; Champaign, Illinois
Feb 11, 1990	No. 16	at No. 10 Purdue	W 70–67 ^{OT}	16–5 (8–3)	Mackey Arena; West Lafayette, Indiana
Feb 16, 1990	No. 14	Minnesota	W 87–58	17–5 (9–3)	Carver-Hawkeye Arena; Iowa City, Iowa
Feb 23, 1990	No. 13	Ohio State	W 94–51	18–5 (10–3)	Carver-Hawkeye Arena; Iowa City, Iowa
Feb 25, 1990	No. 13	Indiana	W 85–47	19–5 (11–3)	Carver-Hawkeye Arena; Iowa City, Iowa
Mar 2, 1990	No. 11	at No. 13 Northwestern	W 64–43	20–5 (12–3)	Welsh-Ryan Arena; Evanston, Illinois
Mar 4, 1990	No. 11	at Wisconsin	W 79–60	21–5 (13–3)	Wisconsin Field House; Madison, Wisconsin
Mar 8, 1990	No. 10	Michigan	W 78–47	22–5 (14–3)	Carver-Hawkeye Arena; Iowa City, Iowa
Mar 10, 1990	No. 10	Michigan State	W 86–58	23–5 (15–3)	Carver-Hawkeye Arena; Iowa City, Iowa
NCAA tournament
Mar 17, 1990*	(3 ME) No. 10	(6 ME) Vanderbilt; Second round	L 56–61	23–6	Carver-Hawkeye Arena; Iowa City, Iowa
*Non-conference game. ^{#}Rankings from AP Poll. (#) Tournament seedings in parentheses. ME=Mideast.
