= Martha Richards =

American collegiate golf coach

Current position
- Title: Head coach
- Team: Denver
- Conference: Summit

Biographical details
- Education: Stanford University ('93)

Playing career

Basketball
- 1988–1991: Stanford

Golf
- 1991–1993: Stanford
- 1995–1996: LPGA

Coaching career (HC unless noted)
- 1993–1996: Stanford (volunteer assistant)
- 1997–1998: Boise State
- 1998–2000: Texas (assistant)
- 2000–2007: Vanderbilt
- 2007–2014: Texas
- 2021–present: Denver

Administrative career (AD unless noted)
- 2017–2021: Aspen High School

Accomplishments and honors

Championships
- SEC (2004); Big XII (2011); 4x Summit League (2022, 2023, 2024, 2025)

Awards
- 2 SEC Coach of the Year (2003, 2004); Golfweek National Coach of the Year (2004); 4x Summit League (2022, 2023, 2024, 2025)

Martha Richards is currently the head coach of the University of Denver Pioneers women's golf team. She has 25+ years of coaching experience in the college golf ranks, the majority as a head coach.

== Early life ==
Richards was born and raised in Hudson, Wisconsin, graduating from Hudson High School in 1988. As a prep basketball player, Richards became the school's all-time leading scorer with 2,038 points over four seasons, culminating with her team making their first ever state tournament appearance in 1988. Additionally in 1988, Martha was awarded both the Wisconsin Miss Basketball and Gatorade Wisconsin Girls Basketball Player of the Year, and was tabbed a USA Today All-American.

In recognition of her high school basketball career, Richards was inducted into the Wisconsin Basketball Coaches Association (WBCA) Hall of Fame in 2010.

As a prep golfer, Richards won the 1987 Wisconsin Girls Individual State Title.

== Stanford University ==
Richards was a two-sport athlete for the Stanford Cardinal. She played on the women's basketball team under head coach Tara VanDerveer for three seasons from 1988 to 1991, and member of the 1990 National Championship Team.

As a member of the women's golf team under coach Tim Baldwin, Richards earned 1993 All-America honors from the National Golf Coaches Association. Later on, she was named to the Pac-10 1990s All-Decade Golf Team. Martha graduated with a Bachelor of Arts in Communication in 1993.

== Coaching career ==
After serving as a volunteer assistant coach at Stanford and a 2-year career on the LPGA Tour (1995–1996), Richards became the women's golf head coach at Boise State (1997). Martha then departed for Texas to serve as an assistant coach from 1998 to 2000.

From 2001 to 2007, Richards was the head coach for Vanderbilt, guiding their women's golf team to the program's first ever SEC conference title (2004), four NCAA championship appearances (2002–2004, 2007), and produced seven All-Americans. Additionally, she was named 2004 National Coach of the Year by Golfweek.

After her Vanderbilt stint, Richards returned to Texas to become their head coach. During her tenure at Texas, she led the Longhorns to the 2011 Big 12 Conference title along with five appearances in the NCAA Championships. Additionally under her guidance, Madison Pressel won the 2011 Big 12 Women's Golf Player of the Year.

Before the start of the 2014 season, Richards announced that it would be her last season as the Texas head coach, citing health reasons.

During her seven year hiatus from head coaching women's college golf, Richards helped launch and establish software company Birdiefire from 2014 to 2016. From 2017 to 2021, Martha served as the Athletic Director at Aspen High School.

On August 7, 2021, Richards re-entered the women's college golf ranks as head coach at Denver University. Since taking on the role, she has helped guide the team to the Summit League conference titles in each of her seasons.
