= Katy Steding =

American basketball player and coach (born 1967)

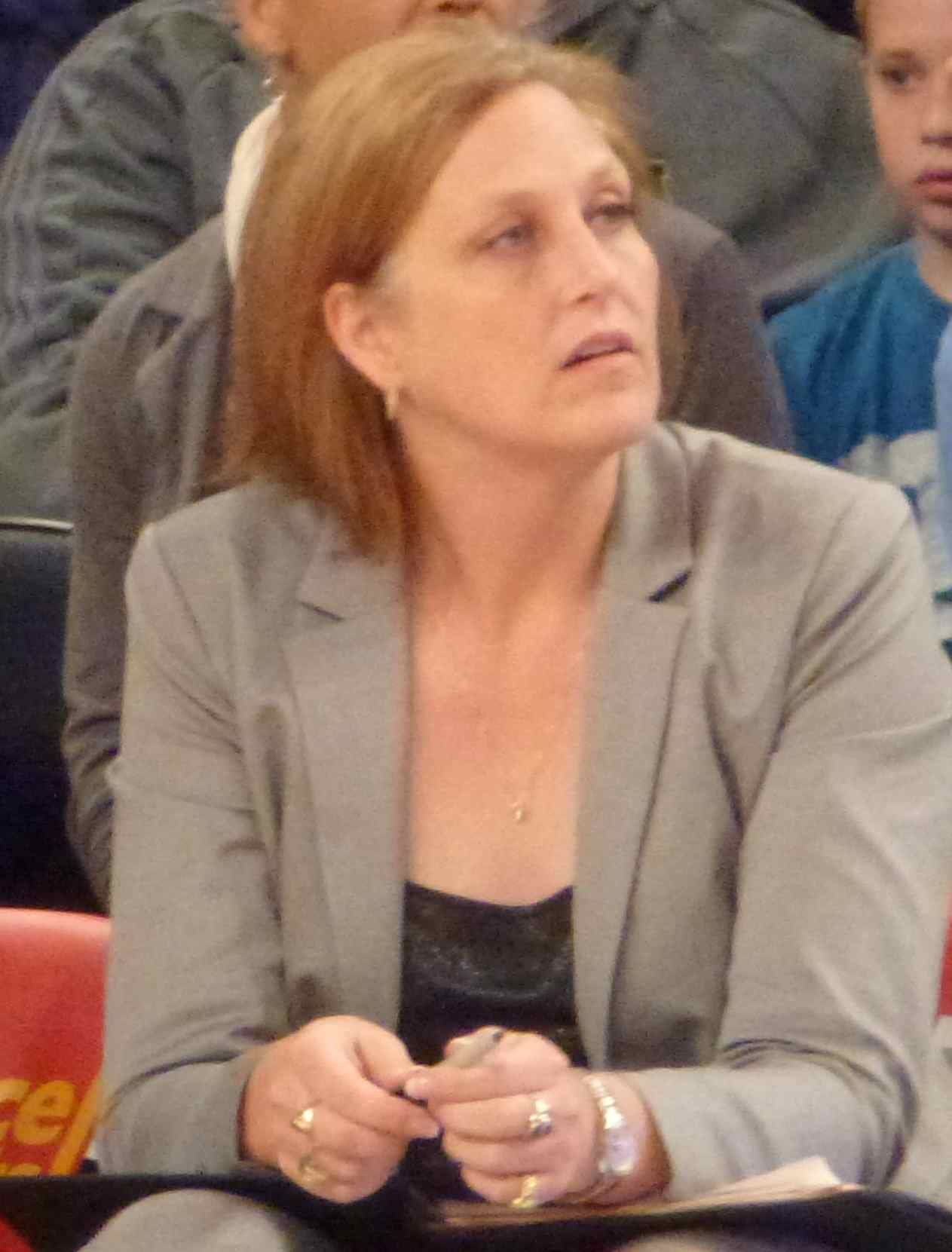
- Steding coaching at Madison Square Garden in 2013

Stanford Cardinal
- Title: Assistant coach
- League: Pac-12 Conference

Personal information
- Born: December 11, 1967 (age 58) Portland, Oregon, U.S.
- Listed height: 6 ft 0 in (1.83 m)
- Listed weight: 173 lb (78 kg)

Career information
- High school: Lake Oswego (Lake Oswego, Oregon)
- College: Stanford (1986–1990)
- WNBA draft: 2000: 1st round, 14th overall pick
- Drafted by: Sacramento Monarchs
- Playing career: 1996–2001
- Position: Small forward
- Number: 1, 11, 23
- Coaching career: 2001–present

Career history

Playing
- 1996–1998: Portland Power
- 2000: Sacramento Monarchs
- 2001: Seattle Storm

Coaching
- 2001–2008: Warner Pacific
- 2008–2009: Atlanta Dream (assistant)
- 2009–2010: Columbia (assistant)
- 2010–2012: San Francisco (assistant)
- 2012–2014: California (assistant)
- 2014–2018: Boston University
- 2018–2020: San Francisco (assistant)
- 2020–present: Stanford (assistant)

Career highlights
- As player: NCAA champion (1990); 3× All Pac-10 (1988–1990); As coach: NCAA champion (2021)

Career WNBA statistics
- Points: 193 (3.5 ppg)
- Rebounds: 74 (1.3 rpg)
- Assists: 38 (0.7 apg)
- Stats at Basketball Reference
Medals
Women's basketball
Representing the United States
Olympic Games
Gold medal – first place	1996 Atlanta	Team competition
Universiade
Gold medal – first place	1991 Sheffield	Team competition

Kathryn Suzanne Steding (born December 11, 1967) is an American former collegiate and professional basketball player. She is currently an assistant coach for the Stanford Cardinal women's basketball team. She was inducted into the Naismith Basketball Hall of Fame in 2026 as a member of the 1996 United States women's Olympic basketball team.

== College career ==
Steding was born in Portland, Oregon, and recruited to Stanford University from Lake Oswego High School near Portland. At Stanford, Steding, a power forward, helped lead Stanford to its first NCAA Women's Division I Basketball Championship in 1990. Steding recorded ten steals in a game against Northwestern in 1988. The ten steals represents the school record for steals in a single game. When she was a freshman, she averaged 8.7 rebounds per game, which still stands (as of 2014) as a school record.

== USA Basketball ==
Steding was named to the team representing the USA at the World University Games held during July 1991 in Sheffield, England. While the USA team had won gold in 1983, they finished with the silver in 1985, in fifth place in 1987, and did not field a team in 1989. The team was coached by Tara VanDerveer of Stanford. After winning opening games easily, the USA faced China in the medal round. The USA shot only 36% from the field, but limited the team from China to 35%, and won 79–76 to advance to the gold medal game. There they faced 7–0 Spain, but won 88–62 to claim the gold medal. Steding averaged 10.3 points per game.

Steding was selected to represent the USA at the 1995 USA Women's Pan American Games, however, only four teams committed to participate, so the event was cancelled.

After Stanford, Steding played basketball in Japan and Spain (Banco Exterior 1993–1994) in the early 1990s before earning a spot on the U.S. national team, where she earned a gold medal in the 1996 Summer Olympics.

== Professional career ==
With the formation of the American Basketball League in 1996, Steding returned to Oregon and became the founding player for the Portland Power. When the league folded in 1998, Steding joined the WNBA and played the 2000 season with the Sacramento Monarchs and the 2001 season with the Seattle Storm before retiring from professional basketball. She was drafted by the Monarchs with the 14th overall pick of the 2000 draft.

== Career statistics ==
=== WNBA career statistics ===
Legend
GP	Games played	GS	Games started	MPG	Minutes per game	RPG	Rebounds per game
APG	Assists per game	SPG	Steals per game	BPG	Blocks per game	PPG	Points per game
TO	Turnovers per game	FG%	Field-goal percentage	3P%	3-point field-goal percentage	FT%	Free-throw percentage
**Bold**	Career best	°	League leader

==== Regular season ====
Year	Team	GP	GS	MPG	FG%	3P%	FT%	RPG	APG	SPG	BPG	TO	PPG
2000	Sacramento	**29**	0	10.7	**37.9**	32.1	28.6	1.3	0.5	0.4	0.3	**0.6**	3.1
2001	Seattle	26	**17**	**15.1**	37.2	**45.7**	**80.0**	1.3	**0.9**	**0.6**	0.3	0.8	**3.9**
Career	2 years, 2 teams	55	17	12.8	37.6	37.5	66.7	1.3	0.7	0.5	0.3	0.7	3.5

==== Playoffs ====
Year	Team	GP	GS	MPG	FG%	3P%	FT%	RPG	APG	SPG	BPG	TO	PPG
2000	Sacramento	2	0	5.0	0.0	0.0	0.0	0.5	0.5	0.0	0.0	1.0	0.0
Career	1 year, 1 team	55	17	12.8	37.6	37.5	66.7	1.3	0.7	0.5	0.3	0.7	3.5

=== College ===
Year	Team	GP	GS	MPG	FG%	3P%	FT%	RPG	APG	SPG	BPG	TO	PPG
1987–88	Stanford	32	-	-	40.2	33.3	78.9	**6.9**	2.7	1.1	0.8	-	10.0
1988–89	Stanford	31	-	-	45.6	44.5	72.5	5.7	2.5	**2.0**	**0.9**	-	14.8
1989–90	Stanford	**33**	-	-	**46.8**	**46.4**	**81.7**	6.7	**2.8**	1.8	0.5	-	**15.1**
**Career**		96	-	-	44.5	43.3	77.5	6.5	2.7	1.6	0.7	-	13.3
Statistics retrieved from Sports-Reference.

== Coaching career ==
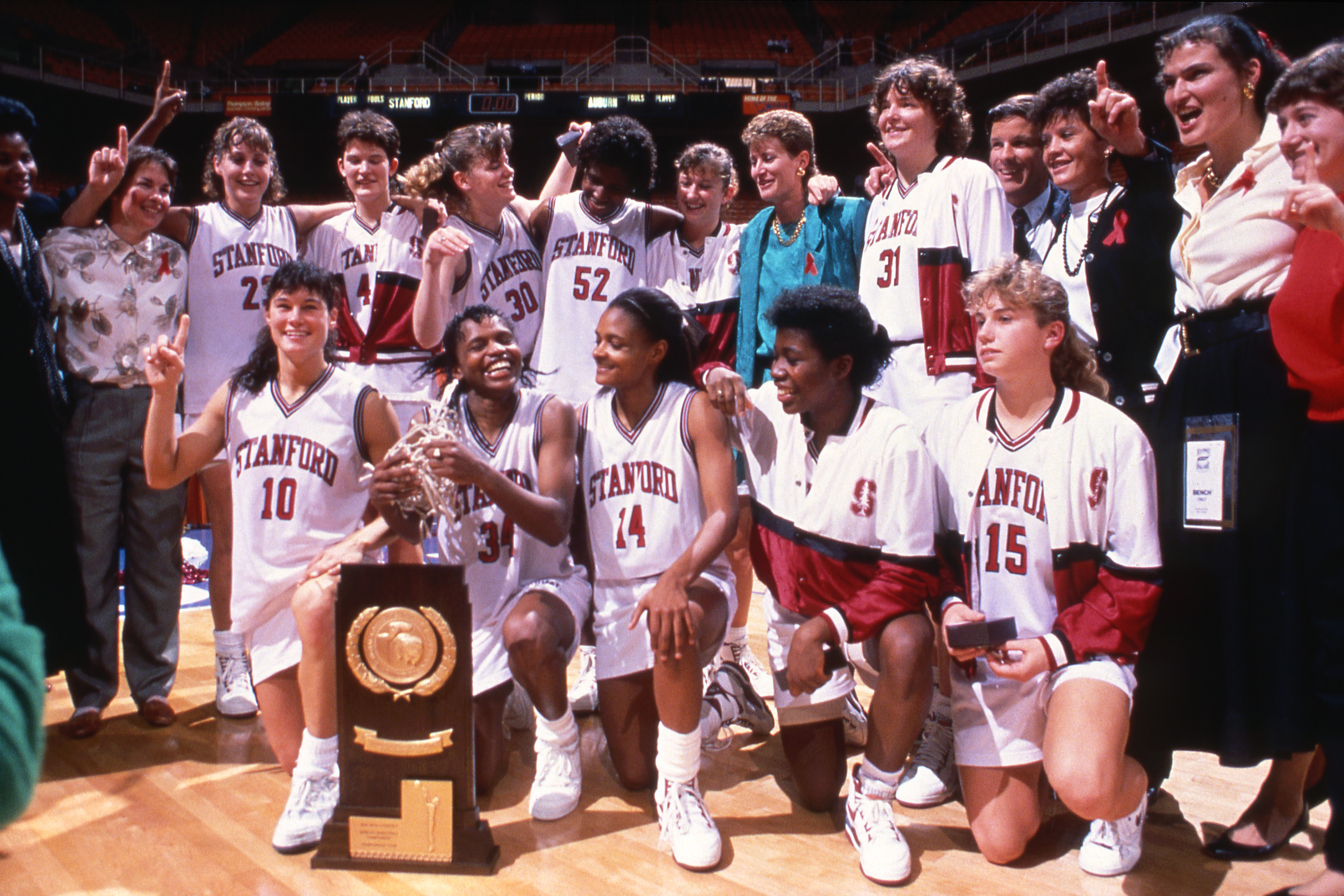
Stanford Cardinal team with National Championship Trophy; Steding is #23, back row, third from left

In 2001, Steding was named head women's basketball coach at Warner Pacific College. Under her leadership, Warner Pacific went to the NAIA basketball tournament for the first time in school history in 2004. In 2006, Steding's team won its first Cascade Conference championship and returned to the NAIA tournament. Steding was selected as Cascade Conference Coach of the Year. Also in 2006, she took a position as Director of Marketing and College Relations for Warner Pacific.

In 2008, Steding was named an assistant coach of the WNBA expansion team Atlanta Dream. After one year with the Dream, she was hired as an assistant coach for Columbia Lions women's basketball. In 2010, Steding was hired as an assistant coach for the San Francisco Dons women's basketball team, working with head coach and former Stanford teammate Jennifer Azzi.

In May 2012, Steding was named an assistant coach of the California Golden Bears women's basketball team.

In June 2014, she was named as the new head coach of Boston University Terriers women's basketball where she remained until 2018.

In 2020, Steding became an assistant coach for her alma mater, the Stanford Cardinal women's basketball team.

== Head coaching record ==
Record table
Season	Team	Overall	Conference	Standing	Postseason
Boston University Terriers (Patriot League) (2014–2018)
2014–15	Boston University	5–25	2–16	10th	
2015–16	Boston University	3–27	3–15	10th	
2016–17	Boston University	13–17	11–7	T–4th	
2017–18	Boston University	10–19	5–13	9th	
Boston University:		31–88 (.261)	21–51 (.292)		
Total:		31–88 (.261)			
National champion Postseason invitational champion Conference regular season champion Conference regular season and conference tournament champion Division regular season champion Division regular season and conference tournament champion Conference tournament champion

== Personal ==
Steding was inducted into the Oregon Sports Hall of Fame in 2004, and is also a member of the Stanford Athletic Hall of Fame.
