= 1989–90 Louisiana Tech Lady Techsters basketball team =

1989-90 Louisiana Tech women's basketball season

1989–90 Louisiana Tech Lady Techsters basketball

American South champions

NCAA tournament, Runner-up
- Conference: American South Conference

Ranking
- Coaches: No. 3
- AP: No. 1
- Record: 32–1 (10–0 American South Conference)
- Head coach: Leon Barmore (5th season)
- Assistant coaches: Kim Mulkey; Jennifer White
- Home arena: Thomas Assembly Center

1989–90 American South women's basketball standings
	Conf.				Overall
Team	W		L	PCT	W		L	PCT
No. 1 Louisiana Tech †	10	–	0	1.000	32	–	1	.970
Lamar	7	–	3	.700	19	–	10	.655
New Orleans	5	–	5	.500	10	–	18	.357
Arkansas State	4	–	6	.400	12	–	14	.462
Louisiana-Lafayette	3	–	7	.300	11	–	17	.393
Texas-Rio Grande Valley	0	–	10	.000	3	–	24	.111
† 1990 ASC Tournament winner Rankings from AP Poll

The 1989–90 Louisiana Tech Lady Techsters basketball team represented Louisiana Tech University during the 1989–90 NCAA Division I women's basketball season. The team was led by fifth–year head coach Leon Barmore, who led the team to a 32–1 record, the NCAA tournament, and the program's fourth straight Final Four. The Lady Techsters played their home games at the Thomas Assembly Center in Ruston, Louisiana as a member of the American South Conference.

== Roster ==
1989–90 Louisiana Tech Lady Techsters women's basketball team
Players
Coaches

Pos.	#	Name	Height	Year	Hometown
G	3	Shelia Ethridge	5 ft 8 in (1.73 m)	Sr	Ruston, Louisiana
	22	Phoebe Dunn	5 ft 8 in (1.73 m)	Sr	Abernathy, Texas
F	32	Annie Lockett	5 ft 11 in (1.8 m)	Jr
C	43	Venus Lacy	6 ft 4 in (1.93 m)	Sr	Chattanooga, Tennessee
	50	Jocelyn Watson	6 ft 0 in (1.83 m)	Sr	McNeil, Arkansas

Head coach

- Leon Barmore

Assistant coach(es)

- Mary Kay Hungate
- Kim Mulkey
- Jennifer White

Legend

- (C) Team captain
- (S) Suspended
- (I) Ineligible
- (W) Walk-on
- Injured
- Current redshirt

== Schedule and results ==
Date time, TV	Rank^{#}	Opponent^{#}	Result	Record	Site (attendance) city, state
Regular season
Dec 1, 1989*	No. 2	Mississippi Valley State; Louisiana Tech Dial Soap Classic	W 95–51	3–0	Thomas Assembly Center (2,513); Ruston, Louisiana
Dec 2, 1989*	No. 2	No. 10 Iowa; Louisiana Tech Dial Soap Classic	W 85–82	4–0	Thomas Assembly Center (2,603); Ruston, Louisiana
Dec 9, 1989*	No. 2	at No. 1 Tennessee	W 59–58	6–0	Thompson–Boling Arena (9,223); Knoxville, Tennessee
Jan 23, 1990*	No. 1	at No. 9 Stephen F. Austin	W 69–56	15–0	Thompson–Boling Arena (6,639); Nacogdoches, Texas
Feb 20, 1990	No. 1	New Orleans	W 98–60	24–0 (9–0)	Thomas Assembly Center (2,101); Ruston, Louisiana
Feb 22, 1990	No. 1	Louisiana–Lafayette	W 101–52	25–0 (10–0)	Thomas Assembly Center; Ruston, Louisiana
Feb 24, 1990*	No. 1	at Stetson	W 88–46	26–0	Edmunds Center; DeLand, Florida
Feb 26, 1990*	No. 1	at UCF	W 121–57	27–0	Education Gymnasium (727); Orlando, Florida
American South tournament
Mar 9, 1990*	(1) No. 1	(5) Louisiana–Lafayette; Semifinals	W 124–51	28–0	Thomas Assembly Center (1,837); Ruston, Louisiana
Mar 10, 1990*	(1) No. 1	(2) Lamar; Championship game	W 79–58	29–0	Thomas Assembly Center (2,026); Ruston, Louisiana
NCAA tournament
Mar 17, 1990*	(1 MW) No. 1	(8 MW) Southern Miss; Second round	W 89–70	30–0	Thomas Assembly Center (4,177); Ruston, Louisiana
Mar 22, 1990*	(1 MW) No. 1	at (4 MW) No. 15 Purdue; Regional Semifinal – Sweet Sixteen	W 91–47	31–0	Frank Erwin Center (7,200); Austin, Texas
Mar 24, 1990*	(1 MW) No. 1	at (3 MW) No. 8 Texas; Regional Final – Elite Eight	W 71–57	32–0	Frank Erwin Center (12,390); Austin, Texas
Mar 30, 1990*	(1 MW) No. 1	vs. (2 ME) No. 9 Auburn; National Semifinal – Final Four	L 69–81	32–1	Thompson-Boling Arena (19,467); Knoxville, Tennessee
*Non-conference game. ^{#}Rankings from AP Poll. (#) Tournament seedings in parentheses. All times are in Central.
