= 1989–90 Stanford Cardinal women's basketball team =

Intercollegiate basketball season

1989–90 Stanford Cardinal women's basketball

NCAA tournament national champions Pac–10 regular season champions Communiplex Classic Champions Cardinal Classic
- Conference: Pacific-10 Conference

Ranking
- Coaches: No. 1
- AP: No. 2
- Record: 32–1 (17–1 Pac-10)
- Head coach: Tara VanDerveer (5th season)
- Assistant coaches: Amy Tucker; Reneé Brown

1989–90 Pacific-10 Conference women's basketball standings
| | Conf. | | | | Overall |
| Team | W | | L | PCT | W | | L | PCT |
|---|---|---|---|---|---|---|---|---|
| No. 2 Stanford | 17 | – | 1 | .944 | 32 | – | 1 | .970 |
| No. 3 Washington | 17 | – | 1 | .944 | 28 | – | 3 | .903 |
| UCLA | 12 | – | 6 | .667 | 17 | – | 12 | .586 |
| Washington State | 9 | – | 9 | .500 | 17 | – | 11 | .607 |
| California | 9 | – | 9 | .500 | 17 | – | 12 | .586 |
| Oregon | 9 | – | 9 | .500 | 17 | – | 12 | .586 |
| USC | 6 | – | 12 | .333 | 8 | – | 19 | .296 |
| Arizona State | 5 | – | 13 | .278 | 13 | – | 15 | .464 |
| Arizona | 5 | – | 13 | .278 | 11 | – | 17 | .393 |
| Oregon State | 1 | – | 17 | .056 | 5 | – | 26 | .161 |
As of April 1, 1991; Rankings from AP Poll

The 1989–90 Stanford Cardinal women's basketball team represented Stanford University in the 1989–90 NCAA Division I women's basketball season. The Cardinal were coached by Tara VanDerveer who was in her fifth year with the team. The Cardinal were members of the Pacific-10 Conference. They won their first NCAA Championship.

== Roster ==
| Number | Name | Height | Position | Class |
|---|---|---|---|---|
| 10 | Jennifer Azzi | 5'9" | Guard | Senior |
| 11 | Celeste Lavoie | 6'1" | Forward | Junior |
| 14 | Stacy Parson | 5'7" | Guard | Senior |
| 15 | Molly Goodenbour | 5'6" | Guard | Freshman |
| 23 | Katy Steding | 6'0" | Forward | Senior |
| 24 | Tammy Svoboda | 6'3" | Center/Forward | Junior |
| 30 | Trisha Stevens | 6'3" | Center/Forward | Junior |
| 31 | Chris MacMurdo | 6'0" | Forward | Freshman |
| 34 | Sonja Henning | 5'8" | Guard | Junior |
| 41 | Martha Richards | 5'11" | Guard/Forward | Sophomore |
| 44 | Julie Zeilstra | 6'3" | Center/Forward | Sophomore |
| 52 | Val Whiting | 6'3" | Center | Freshman |

== Schedule ==
| Date time, TV | Rank^{#} | Opponent^{#} | Result | Record | Site (attendance) city, state |
Regular season
| November 24, 1989* | No. 3 | vs. Michigan State; Communiplex Classic | W 73–63 | 1–0 | Riverfront Coliseum (250); Cincinnati, OH |
| November 25, 1989* | No. 3 | vs. Ohio; Communiplex Classic | W 73–63 | 2–0 | Riverfront Coliseum (750); Cincinnati, OH |
| December 10, 1989* | No. 3 | San Diego State | W 109–45 | 3–0 | Maples Pavilion (929); Stanford, CA |
| December 15, 1989* | No. 3 | No. 2 Tennessee; Rivalry | W 85–71 | 4–0 | Maples Pavilion (5,425); Stanford, CA |
| December 19, 1989* | No. 2 | at Holy Cross | W 88–65 | 5–0 | Hart Center (390); Worcester, MA |
| December 21, 1989* | No. 2 | at Boston College | W 81–74 | 6–0 | Conte Forum (919); Boston, MA |
| December 29, 1989* | No. 2 | Eastern Michigan; Cardinal Classic | W 105–58 | 7–0 | Maples Pavilion (2,405); Stanford, CA |
| December 30, 1989* | No. 2 | No. 23 Providence; Cardinal Classic | W 89–64 | 8–0 | Maples Pavilion (3,268); Stanford, CA |
| January 2, 1990* | No. 2 | San Francisco | W 90–46 | 9–0 | Maples Pavilion (1,533); Stanford, CA |
| January 5, 1990 | No. 2 | at Oregon State | W 84–62 | 10–0 (1–0) | Gill Coliseum (1,213); Corvallis, OR |
| January 7, 1990 | No. 2 | at Oregon | W 76–57 | 11–0 (2–0) | McArthur Court (1,989); Eugene, OR |
| January 11, 1990 | No. 2 | No. 7 Washington | W 102–62 | 12–0 (3–0) | Maples Pavilion (3,512); Stanford, CA |
| January 13, 1990 | No. 2 | Washington State | W 92–70 | 13–0 (4–0) | Maples Pavilion (2,888); Stanford, CA |
| January 18, 1990 | No. 2 | at UCLA | W 98–80 | 14–0 (5–0) | Pauley Pavilion (500); Los Angeles, CA |
| January 20, 1990 | No. 2 | at USC | W 98–64 | 15–0 (6–0) | Los Angeles Memorial Sports Arena (1,000); Los Angeles, CA |
| January 23, 1990* | No. 2 | No. 6 Long Beach State | W 105–91 | 16–0 | Maples Pavilion (2,418); Stanford, CA |
| January 25, 1990 | No. 2 | Arizona | W 92–69 | 17–0 (7–0) | Maples Pavilion (1,902); Stanford, CA |
| January 27, 1990 | No. 2 | Arizona State | W 90–63 | 18–0 (8–0) | Maples Pavilion (2,726); Stanford, CA |
| February 2, 1990 | No. 2 | California | W 87–60 | 19–0 (9–0) | Haas Pavilion (2,511); Berkeley, CA |
| February 8, 1990 | No. 2 | at Washington State | W 90–64 | 20–0 (10–0) | Beasley Coliseum (1,215); Pullman, WA |
| February 10, 1990 | No. 2 | at No. 7 Washington | L 78–81 | 20–1 (10–1) | Hec Edmundson Pavilion (7,704); Seattle, WA |
| February 15, 1990 | No. 3 | USC | W 86–60 | 21–1 (11–1) | Maples Pavilion (2,410); Stanford, CA |
| February 17, 1990 | No. 3 | UCLA | W 91–65 | 22–1 (12–1) | Maples Pavilion (4,252); Stanford, CA |
| February 22, 1990 | No. 3 | at Arizona State | W 106–64 | 23–1 (13–1) | ASU Activity Center (358); Tempe, AZ |
| February 24, 1990 | No. 3 | at Arizona | W 113–70 | 24–1 (14–1) | McKale Center (642); Tucson, AZ |
| March 2, 1990 | No. 2 | California | W 112–84 | 25–1 (15–1) | Maples Pavilion (4,038); Stanford, CA |
| March 8, 1990 | No. 2 | Oregon | W 75–45 | 26–1 (16–1) | Maples Pavilion (2,506); Stanford, CA |
| March 10, 1990 | No. 2 | Oregon State | W 94–48 | 27–1 (17–1) | Maples Pavilion (3,716); Stanford, CA |
NCAA women's tournament
| March 18, 1990* | (1 W) No. 2 | vs. (9 W) No. 16 Hawaii; Second Round | W 106–76 | 28–1 | Maples Pavilion (4,815); Stanford, CA |
| March 22, 1990* | (1 W) No. 2 | vs. (5 W) No. 24 Ole Miss; Sweet Sixteen | W 78–65 | 29–1 | Maples Pavilion (7,500); Stanford, CA |
| March 24, 1990* | (1 W) No. 2 | vs. (7 W) No. 22 Arkansas; Elite Eight | W 114–87 | 30–1 | Maples Pavilion (7,500); Stanford, CA |
| March 30, 1990* | (1 W) No. 2 | vs. (2 E) No. 12 Virginia; Final Four | W 75–66 | 31–1 | Thompson-Boling Arena (19,467); Knoxville, TN |
| April 1, 1990* | (1 W) No. 2 | vs. (2 ME) No. 9 Auburn; Championship Game | W 88–81 | 32–1 | Thompson-Boling Arena (20,023); Knoxville, TN |
*Non-conference game. ^{#}Rankings from AP Poll. (#) Tournament seedings in parentheses. W=Stanford, CA regional. All times are in Pacific Time.

== Rankings ==
Regular season polls
| Poll | Pre- Season | Week 2 | Week 3 | Week 4 | Week 5 | Week 6 | Week 7 | Week 8 | Week 9 | Week 10 | Week 11 | Week 12 | Week 13 | Week 14 | Week 15 | Week 16 | Week 17 | Final |
|---|---|---|---|---|---|---|---|---|---|---|---|---|---|---|---|---|---|---|
| AP | 3 | 3 | 3 | 3 | 2 | 2 | 2 | 2 | 2 | 2 | 2 | 2 | 3 | 3 | 2 | 2 | 2 | 2 3 |
| Coaches | 3 | 3 | 3 | 3 | 2 | 2 | 2 | 2 | 2 | 2 | 2 | 2 | 3 | 2 | 2 | 2 | 2 | 1 |

Legend
| | Increase in ranking |
| | Decrease in ranking |
| | Not ranked previous week |
| (RV) | Received Votes |
