= Carolyn Jones-Young =

American women's basketball player

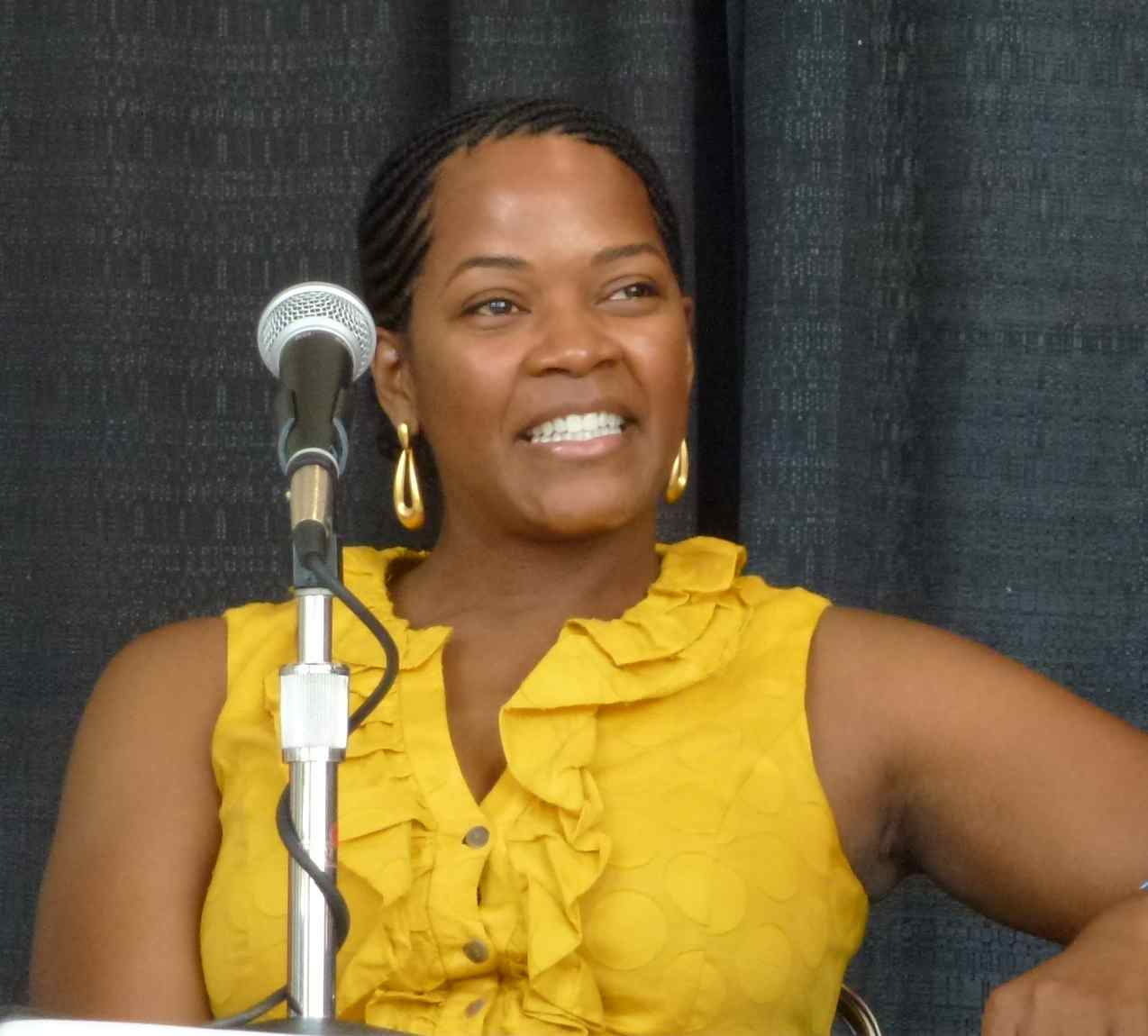

Personal information
- Born: July 29, 1969 (age 57) Bay Springs, Mississippi, U.S.
- Listed height: 5 ft 9 in (1.75 m)
- Listed weight: 175 lb (79 kg)

Career information
- High school: West Jones (Laurel, Mississippi)
- College: Auburn (1988–1991)
- WNBA draft: 1999: 4th round, 42nd overall pick
- Drafted by: New York Liberty
- Playing career: 1999–2002
- Position: Guard
- Number: 12

Career history
- 2001–2002: Portland Fire

Career highlights
- 2× Kodak All-American (1990, 1991); 2× SEC Player of the Year (1990, 1991); SEC Tournament MVP (1990); 3× First-team All-SEC (1989–1991)
- Stats at Basketball Reference
Medals
Women's basketball
Representing the United States
FIBA World Championship
Gold medal – first place	1990 Malaysia	Team competition
World University Games
Gold medal – first place	1991 Sheffield	Team competition
Olympic Games
Bronze medal – third place	1992 Barcelona	Team competition

Carolyn Jones-Young (born Carolyn Jones; July 29, 1969) is an American former professional women's basketball player. A 5'9" guard, she played for the New England Blizzard of the American Basketball League (1996–1998), and also played for the Portland Fire of the Women's National Basketball Association. She holds several ABL career records.

== College ==
Carolyn Jones played for Auburn University, graduating in 1991. Jones led Auburn to the NCAA Final Four in both 1989 and 1990, losing in the final game both years. Jones was named to the NCAA All-tournament Team in 1990.

== Career statistics ==
=== WNBA ===
Legend
GP	Games played	GS	Games started	MPG	Minutes per game	RPG	Rebounds per game
APG	Assists per game	SPG	Steals per game	BPG	Blocks per game	PPG	Points per game
TO	Turnovers per game	FG%	Field-goal percentage	3P%	3-point field-goal percentage	FT%	Free-throw percentage
**Bold**	Career best	°	League leader

==== Regular season ====
Year	Team	GP	GS	MPG	FG%	3P%	FT%	RPG	APG	SPG	BPG	TO	PPG
2001	Portland	**23**	**1**	**12.1**	**37.4**	29.4	73.0	**1.5**	**0.7**	**0.6**	0.0	1.2	**4.8**
2002	Portland	19	0	9.8	35.1	**45.5**	**87.5**	0.7	0.6	0.2	0.0	**0.9**	4.4
Career	2 years, 1 team	42	1	11.1	36.4	35.7	78.7	1.1	0.6	0.4	0.0	1.1	4.6

=== College ===
Legend
GP	Games played	GS	Games started	MPG	Minutes per game
FG%	Field goal percentage	3P%	3-point field goal percentage	FT%	Free throw percentage
RPG	Rebounds per game	APG	Assists per game	SPG	Steals per game
BPG	Blocks per game	PPG	Points per game	**Bold**	Career high

Year	Team	GP	Points	FG%	3P%	FT%	RPG	APG	SPG	BPG	PPG
88-89	Auburn	34	494	50.0%	**45.7%**	77.9%	4.4	1.7	1.9	0.2	14.5
89-90	Auburn	**35**	**703**	43.8%	42.6%	81.3%	**5.7**	**2.1**	1.4	**0.3**	20.1
90-91	Auburn	31	634	**50.3%**	39.5%	**83.0%**	4.0	1.7	**2.5**	0.1	**20.5**
TOTAL	Auburn	100	1831	47.7%	41.5%	81.0%	4.7	1.9	1.9	0.2	18.3

== USA Basketball ==
Jones was a member of the USA National team at the 1990 World Championships, held in Kuala Lumpur, Malaysia. The team won their opening round games fairly easily, with the closest of the first three games a 27-point victory over Czechoslovakia. Then they faced Cuba, a team that had beaten the US in exhibition matches only a few weeks earlier. The USA team was losing at halftime, but came back to win 87–78. The USA team found itself behind at halftime to Canada in their next game, but came back to win easily 95–70. After an easy match against Bulgaria, the USA team faced Czechoslovakia again, end achieved an almost identical result, winning 87–59. In the title match, the USA team won the gold medal with a score of 88–78. Jones averaged 2.8 points per game.

Jones was named to the team representing the US at the World University Games held during July 1991 in Sheffield, England. While the USA team had won gold in 1983, they finished with the silver in 1985, in fifth place in 1987, and did not field a team in 1989. The team was coached by Tara VanDerveer of Stanford. After winning opening games easily, the USA faced China in the medal round. The USA shot only 36% from the field, but limited the team from China to 35%, and won 79–76 to advance to the gold medal game. There they faced 7–0 Spain, but won 88–62 to claim the gold medal. Jones was the team's second leading scorer with 13 points per game, tied with Lisa Leslie's 13 points per game.

Jones was a member of the US National team that won the bronze medal in the 1992 Barcelona Olympics.

== ABL career ==
Jones played in all 2½ seasons of the ABL, all for the New England Blizzard. She holds two significant ABL career records: most points per game (21.5 ppg) and most free throws made (555). She is second only to Teresa Edwards in ABL career total points scored (Edwards had 2,035 points in 98 games, while Jones-Young scored 1,910 in 89 games).

Jones was named to the All-ABL 2nd team for the ABL's inaugural 1996–1997 season. She improved on that in her second ABL season, making the All-ABL 1st Team for 1997–1998. The league folded midway through the third season, so Jones is one of only five players to make the All-ABL list in both its seasons—the others being Teresa Edwards, Dawn Staley, Natalie Williams and Adrienne Goodson.

== WNBA career ==
Jones married Charlton Young in 1998. In 1999, she was the 42nd overall pick in the fourth round of the WNBA draft, selected by the New York Liberty. In May 2000, the Liberty traded Jones-Young to the Portland Fire for Tari Phillips. Coming off a long layoff for injury and the birth of her first daughter, Jones-Young played in a total 42 games as a reserve for the Fire in 2001 and 2002. After her 2002 season, Jones-Young retired.
