= 1989–90 Virginia Cavaliers women's basketball team =

Intercollegiate basketball season

1989–90 Virginia Cavaliers women's basketball

ACC tournament champion

NCAA tournament, Final Four
- Conference: Atlantic Coast Conference

Ranking
- Coaches: No. 4
- AP: No. 12
- Record: 29–6 (11–3 ACC)
- Head coach: Debbie Ryan (13th season)
- Assistant coaches: Frank DiLeo; Shawn Campbell; Melissa Wiggins
- Home arena: University Hall

1989–90 ACC women's basketball standings
	Conf.				Overall
Team	W		L	PCT	W		L	PCT
No. 11 NC State	12	–	2	.857	25	–	6	.806
No. 12 Virginia †	11	–	3	.786	29	–	6	.829
Clemson	10	–	4	.714	22	–	10	.688
Maryland	7	–	7	.500	19	–	11	.633
Wake Forest	5	–	9	.357	16	–	14	.533
Duke	4	–	10	.286	15	–	13	.536
Georgia Tech	4	–	10	.286	13	–	17	.433
North Carolina	3	–	11	.214	13	–	15	.464
† 1990 ACC tournament winner Rankings from AP poll

The 1989–90 Virginia Cavaliers women's basketball team represented the University of Virginia during the 1989–90 NCAA Division I women's basketball season. The Cavaliers were led by 13th-year head coach Debbie Ryan, and played their home games at University Hall in Charlottesville, Virginia as members the Atlantic Coast Conference.

== Roster ==
1989–90 Virginia Cavaliers women's basketball team
Players
Coaches

Pos.	#	Name	Height	Year	Previous school	Hometown
G	10	Dena Evans	5 ft 5 in (1.65 m)	Fr		Deer Park, TX
F	20	Tekshia Ward	6 ft 1 in (1.85 m)	Jr		College Park, GA
F/C	21	Melanee Wagener	6 ft 2 in (1.88 m)	So		Mount Airy, MD
F	23	Tonya Cardoza	5 ft 10 in (1.78 m)	Jr		Roxbury, MA
G	24	Dawn Staley	5 ft 6 in (1.68 m)	So	Dobbins Tech	Philadelphia, PA
C	30	Heather Burge	6 ft 5 in (1.96 m)	Fr	Palos Verdes	Palos Verdes Estates, CA
G	32	Tammi Reiss	5 ft 6 in (1.68 m)	So	Eldred Central School	Eldred, NY
C	34	Heidi Burge	6 ft 5 in (1.96 m)	Fr	Palos Verdes	Palos Verdes Estates, CA

Head coach

- Debbie Ryan (Ursinus)

Assistant coach(es)

Legend

- (C) Team captain
- (S) Suspended
- (I) Ineligible
- (W) Walk-on
- Injured
- Current redshirt

Roster

== Schedule ==
Date time, TV	Rank^{#}	Opponent^{#}	Result	Record	Site (attendance) city, state
Regular season
ACC tournament
NCAA tournament
March 17, 1990*	No. 12	vs. Penn State; Second round	W 85–64	27–5	University Hall; Charlottesville, Virginia
March 22, 1990*	No. 12	vs. No. 18 Providence; East Regional Semifinal – Sweet Sixteen	W 77–71	28–5	Norfolk Scope; Norfolk, Virginia
March 24, 1990*	No. 12	vs. No. 4 Tennessee; East Regional Final – Elite Eight	W 79–75 ^{OT}	29–5	Norfolk Scope; Norfolk, Virginia
March 30, 1990*	No. 12	vs. No. 2 Stanford; National Semifinal – Final Four	L 66–75	29–6	Thompson–Boling Arena (19,467); Knoxville, Tennessee
*Non-conference game. ^{#}Rankings from AP Poll. (#) Tournament seedings in parentheses. All times are in Eastern.
