= Tara VanDerveer =

American basketball coach (born 1953)

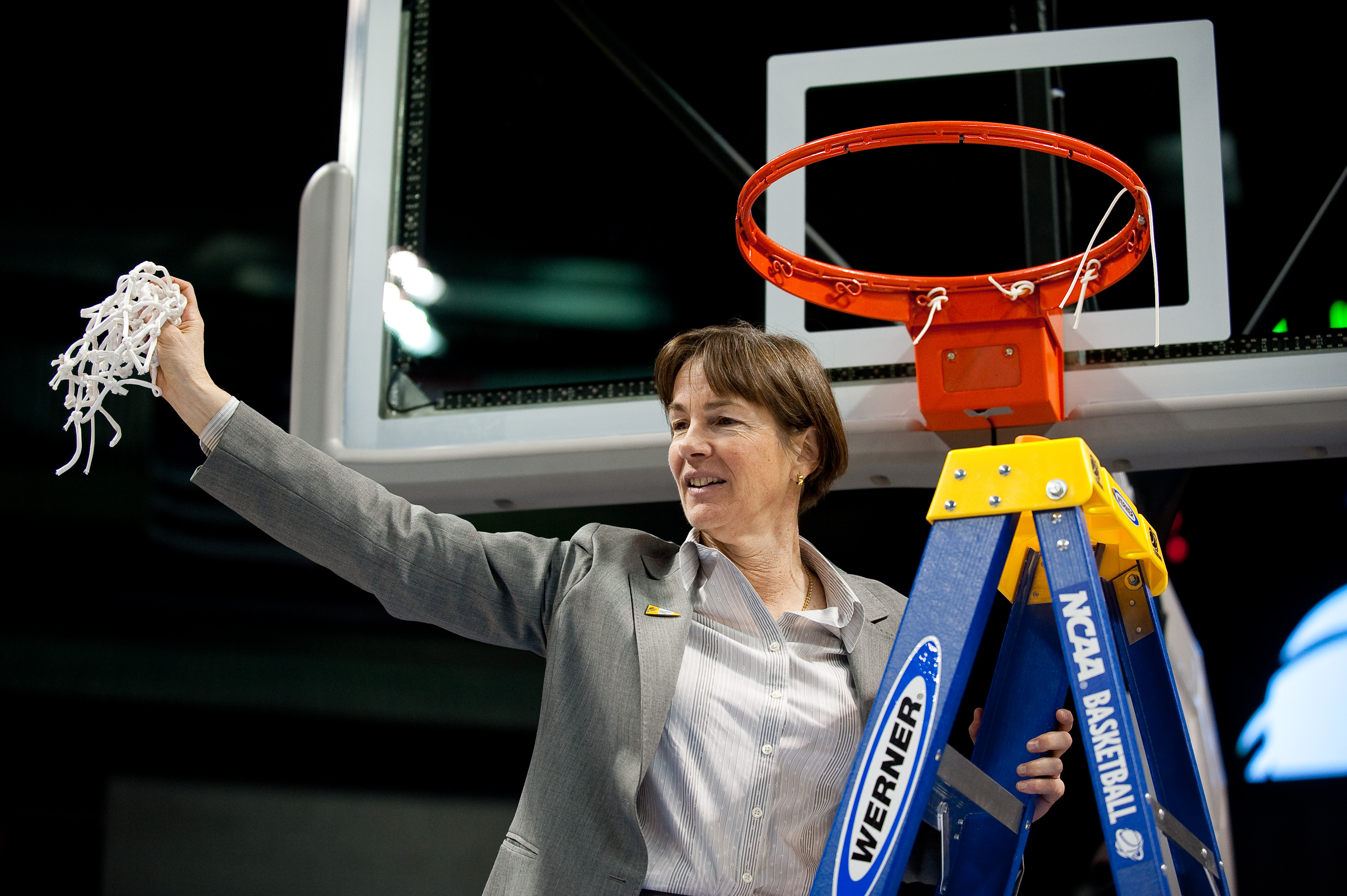
- VanDerveer cutting down the nets after the Elite 8 game in the 2011 NCAA Division I tournament

Biographical details
- Born: June 26, 1953 (age 73); Melrose, Massachusetts, U.S.

Playing career

Basketball
- 1971–1972: Albany
- 1972–1975: Indiana
- Position: Guard

Coaching career (HC unless noted)
- 1976–1978: Ohio State (assistant)
- 1978–1980: Idaho
- 1980–1985: Ohio State
- 1986–2024: Stanford

National team
- 1995–1996: USA

Head coaching record
- Overall: 1,216–271 (.818)
- Tournaments: 0–1 (AIAW Division II); 104–36 (NCAA Division I); 5–1 (Big Ten); 27–2 (Pac-10); 29–6 (Pac-12)

Accomplishments and honors

Championships
- 3× NCAA Division I Tournament (1990, 1992, 2021); 14× NCAA Regional—Final Four (1990–1992, 1995, 1997, 2008–2012, 2014, 2017, 2021, 2022); 27× Pac-12 Conference regular season (1989–1993, 1995–1998, 2001–2014, 2021–2024); 15× Pac-12 Conference tournament championships (2003–05, 2007–13, 2015, 2017, 2019, 2021–2022); 4× Big Ten Regular Season (1982–1985)

Awards
- 5× National Coach of the Year (1988–1990, 2011, 2020); 18× Pac-10/12 Coach of the Year (1989, 1990, 1995, 1997, 2002, 2003, 2005, 2006, 2008, 2009, 2011–2014, 2018, 2021, 2022, 2024); 5× WBCA District/Region Coach of the Year (1988–1990, 2007, 2009); John R. Wooden Legends of Coaching Award (2014); 5× Northern California Women's Intercollegiate Coach of the Year (1988–1990, 1992, 1993); 2× Big Ten Coach of the Year (1984, 1985)
- Basketball Hall of Fame; Inducted in 2011 (profile)
- Women's Basketball Hall of Fame
Medal record
Women's basketball
Head Coach for United States
Olympic Games
Gold medal – first place	1996 Atlanta	Team competition
Head Coach for United States
FIBA World Championship for Women
Bronze medal – third place	1994 Sydney	Team competition
Head Coach for United States
Goodwill Games
Gold medal – first place	1994 St. Petersburg	Team competition
Head Coach for United States
World University Games
Gold medal – first place	1991 Sheffield	Team competition

Tara Ann VanDerveer (born June 26, 1953) is an American former basketball coach who was the head women's basketball coach at Stanford University from 1985 until her retirement in 2024. Designated the Setsuko Ishiyama Director of Women's Basketball, VanDerveer led the Stanford Cardinal to three NCAA Women's Division I Basketball Championships, winning in 1990, 1992 and 2021. She stepped away from the Stanford program for a year to coach the U.S. women's national team to a gold medal at the 1996 Olympic Games.

VanDerveer was voted Naismith National Coach of the Year in 1990, 2011, and 2021 and was voted Pac-12 Coach of the Year 18 times. VanDerveer was inducted into the Women's Basketball Hall of Fame in 2002, and has been inducted into the Naismith Basketball Hall of Fame twice: in 2011 for her individual coaching career, and in 2026 as head coach of the 1996 United States women's Olympic basketball team.

VanDerveer is one of only nine NCAA Women's Basketball coaches to win over 900 games, and one of ten NCAA Division I coaches – women's or men's – to win 1,000 games. On December 15, 2020, she won her 1,099th game as a head coach, passing the late Pat Summitt for most wins in women's college basketball history. On January 21, 2024, she won her 1,203rd game as a head coach, passing retired coach Mike Krzyzewski and becoming the winningest head coach in men's or women's college basketball history. VanDerveer retired from coaching at the end of the 2023–24 academic year with 1,216 career wins as a head coach. On November 20, 2024, Geno Auriemma, coach of the UConn women's basketball team, won his 1,217th game as a head coach, passing VanDerveer.

== Early years ==
VanDerveer was born on June 26, 1953 to Dunbar and Rita VanDerveer, who named their first child "Tara" after the plantation in Gone with the Wind. She was born in Melrose, Massachusetts, a part of Greater Boston, but grew up in the small community of West Hill, near Schenectady, New York.

There were no sports teams for girls at her first high school, but she played a number of sports including basketball, in rec leagues and pickup. When she was younger, she played with both boys and girls. As she entered her high school years, the girls dropped out for other interests, so she was more apt to play with boys. To help make sure she would be chosen, she bought the best basketball she could afford, so if the boys wanted to play with her basketball, they would have to pick her.

VanDerveer's family moved to Niagara Falls in her sophomore year of high school. Though she had never played basketball at the high-school level, VanDerveer took the game up again after she transferred to Buffalo Seminary, an all-girls college preparatory school, in her junior year. She ended up earning a place in the Buffalo Seminary's Athletic Hall of Fame.

== College ==
VanDerveer was determined to play basketball in college. Unable to afford tuition at her first choice, Mount Holyoke, she chose to attend Albany where her father had studied for his doctorate. The team was not highly competitive, but she knew the coach, which helped with the decision. The team turned out not to be challenging enough. Although naturally a guard, she shifted to the center position, and led the team in many categories, despite being a freshman on the team. She decided she needed a bigger challenge so she talked some of her friends into attending the AIAW National Championship, the precursor to the NCAA tournament. At the event, VanDerveer watched many teams, took notes, and decided where she wanted to go. She chose Indiana where she transferred and spent three years, making the Dean's List each of the three years. In her sophomore year, 1973, she helped the team reach the Final Four of the AIAW championship, losing in the semi-finals to Queens College. (Note: The "Queens" here is Queens College in New York City (nicknamed Knights), and not to be confused with Queens University of Charlotte (nicknamed Royals), which had been known as Queens College before 2002.)

At that time, the men's basketball team at Indiana was coached by future Hall of Fame coach Bobby Knight. The Indiana women's coach, Bea Gorton, patterned her style of play and practices after Knight, and it was the observation of the style of play at the AIAW event that persuaded VanDerveer to choose Indiana. VanDerveer enrolled in Knight's basketball coaching classes at IU and regularly observed his team's practices. VanDerveer carried what she learned from Knight to her practices at Stanford.

== Coaching career ==
After completing college, VanDerveer took a year off, with a plan to return to law school. When she ran out of money she returned home. When her parents realized she was doing little beyond playing chess and sleeping, they urged her to help with her sister Marie's basketball team. Her sister was five years younger, and by the time Marie reached high school, the school had basketball teams for girls. Though frustrated by the lack of commitment from the girls on her team, VanDerveer discovered a passion for coaching basketball.

Inspired by the experience, VanDerveer applied to twenty colleges and universities for an unpaid graduate assistant position. She received only two responses, one of which was for Ohio State, where the athletic director had remembered her from Indiana. She was hired as an assistant coach of the varsity team and the head coach of the JV squad.

In her first year, she coached the JV team to an 8–0 season. That caught the attention of Marianne Stanley at Old Dominion, who offered her an assistant coaching position. VanDerveer wanted to finish her master's degree, so accepted a paid position at Ohio State, at a salary less than a quarter of the Old Dominion offer.

=== Idaho ===
After two years at Ohio State, during which VanDerveer earned a master's degree in sports administration, she was hired as head coach at the then-Division II University of Idaho in Moscow. Prior to her arrival, the Vandals had only one winning season in their first four years. The team won the 1978–79 season opener, defeating Northern Montana College 70–68 in overtime in the Kibbie Dome for the first of VanDerveer's career wins. Idaho improved to 17–8 in her first year, and were 25–6 the following season, which earned an invitation to the Division II AIAW tournament. These first 42 wins are generally included in Tara's win total despite being achieved at a Division II level.

=== Ohio State ===
VanDerveer returned to Ohio State as head coach for the 1980–81 season. Her tenure included a record-breaking game against Iowa at Carver-Hawkeye Arena in February 1985 attended by 22,157, then the largest crowd to have attended a women's basketball game. Visiting Ohio State won the game, 56–47.

=== Stanford ===
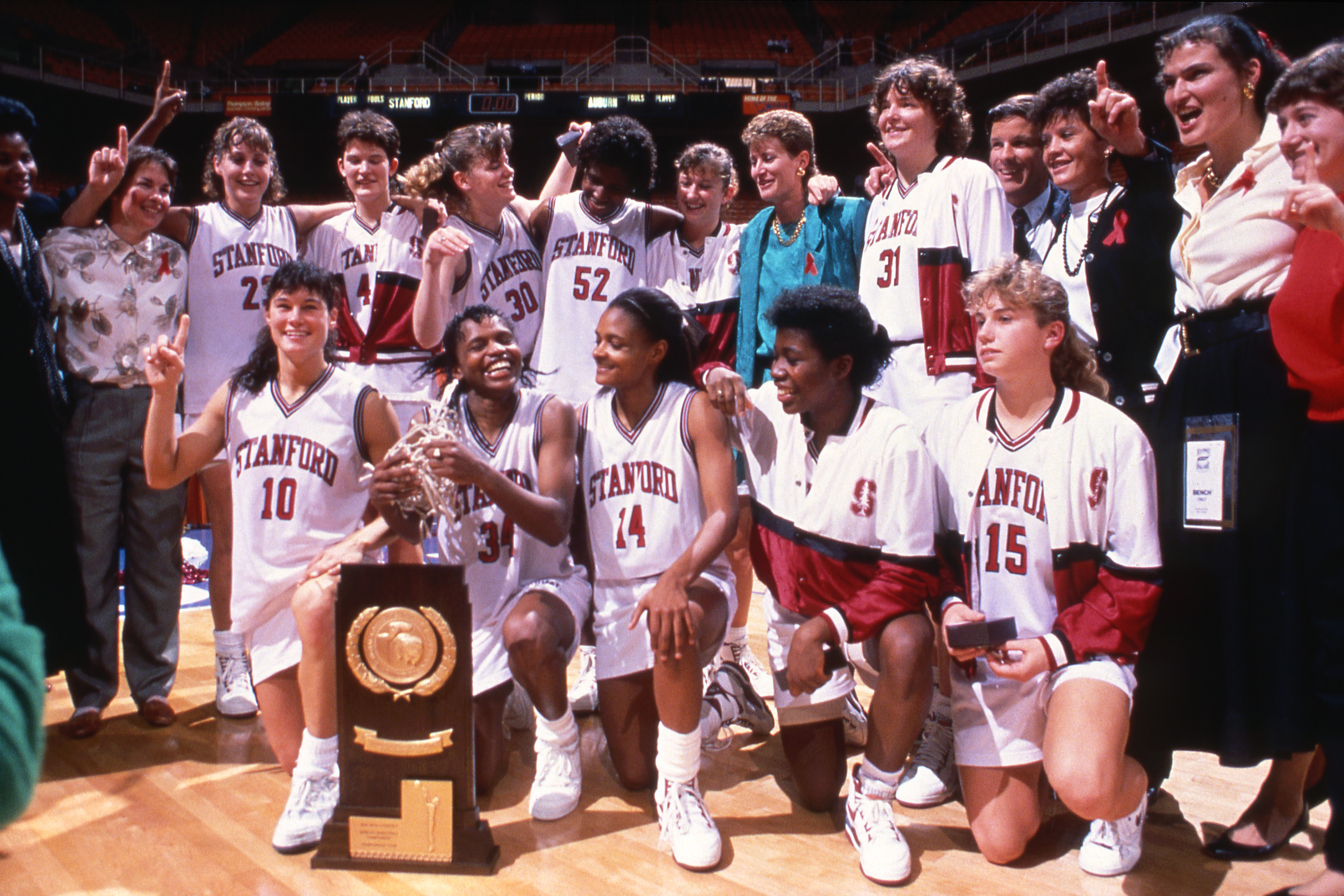
Stanford Cardinal team with 1990 National Championship Trophy

By 1985, VanDerveer had developed Ohio State into a nationally ranked team, breaking into the Top 20 in 1984, and reaching number 7 in the final rankings of 1985. Their success in 1985 earned a two seed in the 1985 NCAA Division I women's basketball tournament. They made it to the Elite Eight, but lost by four points to eventual national champion Old Dominion. While Stanford would later become one of the nation's powerhouses in women's basketball, in 1985 it was coming off a 9–19 year following a 5–23 year, with only 300 fans a game. Despite this challenge, Andy Geiger convinced VanDerveer to come to Stanford to become the head coach. VanDerveer later recounted that her friends told her going to Stanford was a bad move, because Stanford was too "brainy" to be good in sports. She said, "My dad told me I was crazy to take this job. He said, 'You'll be unemployed and coming home to live with us in three months'."

VanDerveer's first year with Stanford was a step backward for the coach. After four consecutive 20-plus win seasons at Ohio State, the Cardinal finished under .500 in her first year, with a 13–15 record. The Cardinal barely improved the following year, reaching 14–14. By her third year, VanDerveer was largely playing with players she recruited in whom she had instilled her coaching philosophy. Stanford's record jumped to 27–5, earning the Cardinal their first NCAA tournament bid since 1982. VanDerveer's team reached the 1988 Sweet Sixteen, and the program earned an invitation to the tournament in every subsequent year under her leadership.

Another milestone was reached in the following year, when Stanford won the Pac-10 regular season, the first of many conference championships. They earned a two seed in the NCAA tournament, and played to their seed, losing to Louisiana Tech in the Midwest regional final.

In the 1990 tournament, Stanford advanced to the Final Four to face Virginia in the semi-final. The Cavaliers were competing in their sixth consecutive NCAA Tournament, and had reached the Sweet Sixteen or Elite Eight in each of the previous three years. Stanford beat Virginia 75–66 to advance to the national championship game. The championship game pitted Stanford against Auburn, who had finished as runner-up in each of the last two Tournaments. Auburn opened up an early lead, but Stanford point guard Jennifer Azzi helped bring the team back to a tie score by halftime, and led a run in the second half that would earn the Most Outstanding player award for Azzi, and the first national championship for VanDerveer and Stanford.

By 2019 Stanford had won two NCAA championships and 12 trips to the Final Four. VanDerveer's coaching record at Stanford was 900–192, making her the fifth Division I coach to chalk up 900 wins at a single school.

On December 14, 2020, VanDerveer tied the record for coaching wins and then surpassed existing women's game wins record (held by Pat Summitt) when Stanford beat Pacific on December 16, 2020.

In April 2021, VanDerveer coached the Cardinal to their third NCAA title with a 66–65 victory over South Carolina in the Final Four and a 54–53 victory over their Pac-12 rival Arizona Wildcats in the championship game. It marked their first title in 29 years.

On April 9, 2024, VanDerveer announced she would retire from coaching, ending a tenure that lasted 38 seasons. A few months after the announcement, in September 2024, VanDerveer signed an agreement with the Washington Speakers Bureau (WSB), where she provides audiences with practical strategies and actionable insights for building high-performing teams and nurturing talent.

=== National team ===
Although the USA Basketball women's national team had considerable success in the 1980s—winning the 1984 Olympics, the 1986 World Championship, the 1988 Olympics, and the 1990 World Championship—there were signs of concern. The USA women's Pan American team, while not formally the national team, has, since the mid-1970s, included many of the same players as the national team. The Pan Am team in 1991 would finish third, signaling a potential end to Team USA's past dominance. The national team finished third at the 1992 Olympics, and third again in the 1994 World Championship. The 1995 Pan Am Games were cancelled, so the national team players did not have a win after the 1992 Olympics.

The USA Basketball organization, with input from VanDerveer, decided to depart from the usual strategy of forming a team a few weeks before the event, which severely limited the practice time. Instead, they decided to form a full-time national team to stay together for a year, preparing to the 1996 Olympics. VanDerveer was chosen as head coach, but was expected to take a one-year sabbatical from her head coaching position at Stanford.

VanDerveer had previously worked with USA Basketball teams in 1986 and 1990, and served as the head coach of the team representing the US at the 1991 World University Games. That team went 8–0 and won the gold medal in Sheffield, England. Two years later, she coached the team in the World Championship qualifying event. She continued as the coach of the National team at the 1994 World Championships in Sydney, where the USA team won the bronze medal. Two months later, VanDerveer coached the USA Goodwill Games team to a 4–0 record and a gold medal at the 1994 Goodwill Games in Saint Petersburg. Though her prior experience meant she was the obvious choice as coach of the Olympic team, she was initially reluctant to take the position, as she had decided that to do it properly she would need to take a leave of absence from Stanford. In her words, "When you're representing your country, it's not something you want to mess up." She eventually decided to take the position, and did take the leave of absence, with Amy Tucker and Marianne Stanley taking over the reins at Stanford in her absence.

Prior to 1996, the head coach had much input into the national team selection. While the USA Basketball organization selected the pool of potential players, the head coach chose the final team. That changed in 1996, when USA Basketball decided to take over the selection role. The initial selection was of 11 players, with plans to add a 12th player later, which would allow the organization to determine what was most needed. The lack of input led to some differences of opinions, as VanDerveer was concerned that the team assembled by USA Basketball was undersized compared with teams like China, which featured a 6 ft 8 in (2.03 m) center.

Although Team USA would win all eight games in the 1996 Olympics, with the closest game being a 15-point victory over Japan, VanDerveer was not certain of victory, even as the team was en route to a 52–0 pre-Olympic record against college and national teams. After beating the Cuban national team on May 26, 1996, in Townsville, Australia, the team record reached 44–0. In their next game against the Ukraine national team, played in Adelaide on May 14, the USA team won again, but VanDerveer was not happy. Ukraine, at full strength, was not the best team in the world, and was not seen to be as strong as Russia or Brazil. Moreover, Ukraine was expected to add better players before the Olympics, yet the USA team won by only 11 points, 62–51. VanDerveer recalled worrying at the time: "There's no way we can play like this and win a gold medal."

The opening game of the Olympics was against Cuba, a team the USA had beaten handily several times during their exhibition tour. The USA team was playing in front of a home crowd and played tight in the beginning, while Cuba hit six of their first eight shots to take a 14–7 lead. The USA team settled down, helped by a spark from the reserves, and went on to win 101–84. The second game was against Ukraine, another team they had played in exhibition, but a team that had competed well against the US, worrying VanDerveer. This time the USA team won by a comfortable score of 98–65.

While the first two games were in the compact Morehouse College gym, filled to capacity with under 5,000 spectators, Team USA would play their third game at the Georgia Dome against Zaire. The total attendance of 31,320 broke the record for the largest crowd ever to witness a women's basketball game. Zaire was over-matched, and the USA team won 107–47, ensuring a place in the medal rounds. The next game was against Australia, one of the stronger teams in the field. The game was the first game played by Team USA after the bombing incident which left the team with little sleep. The attendance set a new record, with 33,952 spectators. The game was close for much of the game, with no team leading by more than six points until late in the second half, when Team USA extended the margin and won 96–79. Team USA had a height advantage in the next game against Japan, with no Japanese player standing over six feet tall (1.83 m). The USA exploited the advantage, and opened up a 28-point lead, but Japan fought back with three-point shooting and cut the lead to 13 at one point. The final margin was 15 points, the closest game to that point.

After emerging undefeated from the group stage, VanDerveer's team faced Australia again in the semi-final match, winning 93–71. They faced Brazil two days later in the championship game, winning 111–87 and earning USA their third Olympic gold in women's basketball.

VanDerveer's Olympic team was considered one of the best ever assembled, and compiled a 60–0 record over the course of the year, culminating in a gold medal at the Olympics in Atlanta.

== Coaching tree ==
Thirteen of VanDerveer's players and assistant coaches have gone on to head coaching positions:

Name	Most recent head coaching position	Years with VanDerveer
Jennifer Azzi	San Francisco (2010–2016)	1987–1990 (player)
Beth Burns	San Diego State (1989–1997, 2005–2013)	2004–2005 (strength and conditioning coach)
Jamie Carey	Omaha (2025–present)	1999–2002 (player)
June Daugherty	Washington State (2007–2018)	1985–1989 (assistant coach)
Molly Goodenbour	San Francisco (2016–present)	1989–1993 (player)
Bobbie Kelsey	Wisconsin (2011–2016)	1992–1996 (player), 2007–2011 (assistant coach)
Lindy La Rocque	UNLV (2020–present)	2009–2012 (player), 2017–2020 (assistant coach)
Karen Middleton	Wisconsin–La Crosse (2016–2023)	1997–2007 (assistant coach)
Kate Paye	Stanford (2024–present)	1991–1995 (player), 2007–2016 (assistant coach), 2016–2024 (associate HC)
Nicole Powell	UC Riverside (2020–2023)	2000–2004 (player)
Julie Rousseau	Pepperdine (2004–2013)	2000–2004 (assistant coach)
Charmin Smith	California (2019–present)	1994–1997 (player), 2004–2007 (assistant coach)
Charli Turner Thorne	Arizona State (1996–2022)	1985–1988 (player)
Heidi VanDerveer	UC San Diego (2012–present)	2003–2004 (video coordinator)

== College head coaching record ==
Record table
Season	Team	Overall	Conference	Standing	Postseason
Idaho Vandals (AIAW independent) (1978–1979)
1978–79	Idaho	17–8			
Idaho Vandals (Northwest Empire League) (1979–1980)
1979–80	Idaho	25–6	10–2		AIAW First Round
Idaho:		42–14 (.750)	10–2 (.833)		
Ohio State Buckeyes (Big Ten Conference) (1980–1985)
1980–81	Ohio State	17–15	2–1	3rd	
1981–82	Ohio State	20–7	3–0	1st	NCAA First Round
1982–83	Ohio State	23–5	15–3	T–1st	
1983–84	Ohio State	22–7	17–1	1st	NCAA First Round
1984–85	Ohio State	28–3	18–0	1st	NCAA Elite Eight
Ohio State:		110–37 (.748)	55–5 (.917)		
Stanford Cardinal (Pacific West Conference) (1985–1986)
1985–86	Stanford	13–15	1–7	5th	
Stanford Cardinal (Pac–10/Pac–12 Conference) (1986–2024)
1986–87	Stanford	14–14	8–10	T–6th	
1987–88	Stanford	27–5	14–4	3rd	NCAA Sweet Sixteen
1988–89	Stanford	28–3	18–0	1st	NCAA Elite Eight
1989–90	Stanford	32–1	17–1	T–1st	NCAA Champions
1990–91	Stanford	26–6	16–2	1st	NCAA Final Four
1991–92	Stanford	30–3	15–3	1st	NCAA Champions
1992–93	Stanford	26–6	15–3	1st	NCAA Sweet Sixteen
1993–94	Stanford	25–6	15–3	2nd	NCAA Elite Eight
1994–95	Stanford	30–3	17–1	1st	NCAA Final Four
1995–96	Stanford	29-3	18-0	1st	NCAA Final Four
1996–97	Stanford	34–2	18–0	1st	NCAA Final Four
1997–98	Stanford	21–6	17–1	1st	NCAA First Round
1998–99	Stanford	18–12	14–4	3rd	NCAA First Round
1999–00	Stanford	21–9	13–5	T–2nd	NCAA Second Round
2000–01	Stanford	19–11	12–6	T–1st	NCAA Second Round
2001–02	Stanford	32–3	18–0	1st	NCAA Sweet Sixteen
2002–03	Stanford	27–5	15–3	1st	NCAA Second Round
2003–04	Stanford	27–7	14–4	T–1st	NCAA Elite Eight
2004–05	Stanford	32–3	17–1	1st	NCAA Elite Eight
2005–06	Stanford	26–8	15–3	1st	NCAA Elite Eight
2006–07	Stanford	29–5	17–1	1st	NCAA Second Round
2007–08	Stanford	35–4	16–2	1st	NCAA Runner-Up
2008–09	Stanford	33–5	17–1	1st	NCAA Final Four
2009–10	Stanford	36–2	18–0	1st	NCAA Runner-Up
2010–11	Stanford	33–3	18–0	1st	NCAA Final Four
2011–12	Stanford	35–2	18–0	1st	NCAA Final Four
2012–13	Stanford	33–3	17–1	T–1st	NCAA Sweet Sixteen
2013–14	Stanford	33–4	17–1	1st	NCAA Final Four
2014–15	Stanford	26–10	13–5	T–3rd	NCAA Sweet Sixteen
2015–16	Stanford	27–8	14–4	3rd	NCAA Elite Eight
2016–17	Stanford	32–6	15–3	T–2nd	NCAA Final Four
2017–18	Stanford	24–11	14–3	2nd	NCAA Sweet Sixteen
2018–19	Stanford	31–5	15–3	2nd	NCAA Elite Eight
2019–20	Stanford	27–6	14–4	T–2nd	Postseason canceled due to COVID
2020–21	Stanford	31–2	19–2	1st	NCAA Champions
2021–22	Stanford	32–4	16–0	1st	NCAA Final Four
2022–23	Stanford	29–6	15–3	T–1st	NCAA Second Round
2023–24	Stanford	30–6	15–3	1st	NCAA Sweet Sixteen
Stanford:		1,064–220 (.829)	577–97 (.856)		
Total:		1,216–271 (.818)			
National champion Postseason invitational champion Conference regular season champion Conference regular season and conference tournament champion Division regular season champion Division regular season and conference tournament champion Conference tournament champion

Sources: Idaho, Ohio State, Big Ten, Stanford.

== Awards and honors ==
- 1984 – Big Ten Coach of the Year
- 1985 – Big Ten Coach of the Year
- Buffalo Seminary's Athletic Hall of Fame
- 1988 – National Coach of the Year.
- 1989 – Russell Athletic/WBCA National Coach of the Year
- 1990 – National Coach of the Year.
- 1990 – US Basketball Writers Association (USBWA) Coach of the Year award in 1990.
- 1995 – Amos Alonzo Stagg Coaching Award by the United States Sports Academy
- 1995 – Indiana University Hall of Fame.
- 1998 – Named to the Women's Sports Foundation International Women's Sports Hall of Fame (Coach category)
- 1999 – Greater Buffalo Sports Hall of Fame
- 2002 – Elected to the Women's Basketball Hall of Fame, located in Knoxville, Tennessee.
- 2010 – Chautauqua Sports Hall of Fame
- 2011 – WBCA Division I Women's Basketball Coach of the Year.
- 2011 – Named to the Naismith Memorial Basketball Hall of Fame.
- 2011 – Naismith College Coach of the Year
- 2011 – AP College Basketball Coach of the Year
- 2018 – Carol Eckman Award
- 2024 – Golden Plate Award of the American Academy of Achievement

== Personal ==
VanDerveer is an avid piano player. Her sister Heidi VanDerveer, who coached for several years with the WNBA's Minnesota Lynx and Seattle Storm, as well as Occidental College in Los Angeles, is now the head coach at UC San Diego.

VanDerveer has a cabin on a private lake in Minnesota where she spends much of the offseason waterskiing.

== See also ==
- List of college women's basketball career coaching wins leaders
