= 1989–90 NCAA Division I women's basketball rankings =

- Season: 1989–90
- NCAA Tournament: 1990
- Preseason No. 1: Louisiana Tech, Tennessee (tie)
- NCAA Tournament Champions: Stanford
NCAA Division I women's basketball rankings


Two human polls comprise the 1989–90 NCAA Division I women's basketball rankings, the AP Poll and the Coaches Poll, in addition to various publications' preseason polls. The AP poll is currently a poll of sportswriters, while the USA Today Coaches' Poll is a poll of college coaches. The AP conducts polls weekly through the end of the regular season and conference play, while the Coaches poll conducts a final, post-NCAA tournament poll as well. The poll produced a list of the top 20 teams from the inception through the 1988–89 season. In 1989–90, the change was made to produce a list of the top 25 teams.

== Legend ==
–	No votes
(#)	Ranking

== AP Poll ==
Team	20-Nov	27-Nov	4-Dec	11-Dec	18-Dec	24-Dec	1-Jan	8-Jan	14-Jan	21-Jan	28-Jan	5-Feb	12-Feb	19-Feb	26-Feb	5-Mar	12-Mar
Louisiana Tech	T1	2	2	1	1	1	1	1	1	1	1	1	1	1	1	1	1
Stanford	3	3	3	3	2	2	2	2	2	2	2	2	3	3	2	2	2
Washington	16	13	15	15	15	12	11	7	10	8	7	7	5	5	4	4	3
Tennessee	T1	1	1	2	4	7	5	5	3	3	5	5	4	4	3	3	4
UNLV	10	9	13	13	13	9	8	6	4	4	3	3	2	2	5	5	5
Stephen F. Austin	12	12	10	11	10	15	14	13	11	9	9	9	8	8	7	6	6
Georgia	4	4	4	4	3	3	3	3	5	7	4	4	7	7	6	7	7
Texas	5	11	6	6	6	5	4	4	6	5	6	6	6	6	8	8	8
Auburn	7	6	5	7	7	13	16	15	14	14	14	13	11	11	12	11	9
Iowa	11	10	7	5	5	4	7	10	13	13	13	16	14	13	11	10	10
North Carolina St.	6	5	9	9	9	8	6	8	12	11	11	11	9	9	9	9	11
Virginia	15	15	12	12	12	10	10	12	9	12	12	12	10	10	15	13	12
Northwestern	–	–	–	–	–	–	–	25	23	20	19	15	15	16	13	15	13
Long Beach St.	9	7	8	8	8	6	9	9	8	6	8	8	12	12	10	14	14
Purdue	8	8	11	10	11	11	13	11	7	10	10	10	13	15	16	16	15
Hawaii	–	25	25	24	21	18	17	17	19	17	17	17	16	14	14	12	16
Northern Ill.	–	–	–	–	–	–	–	–	–	24	24	23	23	22	18	18	17
Providence	–	–	–	–	–	23	23	20	–	–	–	24	22	23	22	20	18
South Carolina	19	17	17	20	19	20	18	18	17	15	15	19	19	20	17	17	19
Southern Miss.	–	–	–	25	22	21	21	22	20	19	18	18	17	17	20	22	20
Tennessee Tech	20	20	20	22	20	19	19	19	18	21	20	20	20	18	23	21	21
Arkansas	–	–	–	–	–	–	–	–	–	–	–	–	–	25	19	19	22
LSU	13	14	16	16	16	16	15	16	16	16	16	14	18	19	21	24	23
Ole Miss	14	19	19	17	25	–	–	–	–	–	–	–	24	–	–	25	24
Saint Joseph's	21	21	23	21	18	24	24	23	22	22	21	21	21	21	24	23	25
DePaul	–	–	22	19	24	25	–	–	–	–	–	–	–	–	–	–	–
Kentucky	–	–	–	–	–	–	25	–	–	–	–	–	–	–	–	–	–
Maryland	17	18	14	14	14	14	12	14	15	23	23	–	–	–	–	–	–
Ohio St.	–	–	24	–	–	–	–	–	–	–	–	–	–	–	–	–	–
Old Dominion	18	16	18	23	23	22	22	21	24	25	25	–	–	–	–	–	–
Oregon	T23	24	–	–	–	–	–	–	–	–	–	–	–	–	–	–	–
Penn St.	–	–	–	–	–	–	–	24	21	18	22	22	–	–	25	–	–
Rutgers	25	–	–	–	–	–	–	–	–	–	–	–	–	–	–	–	–
UConn	–	–	–	–	–	–	–	–	–	–	–	–	25	24	–	–	–
Vanderbilt	22	23	21	18	17	17	20	–	25	–	–	25	–	–	–	–	–
Western Ky.	T23	22	–	–	–	–	–	–	–	–	–	–	–	–	–	–	–

== USA Today Coaches poll ==
Team	20-Nov	28-Nov	5-Dec	12-Dec	19-Dec	26-Dec	3-Jan	11-Jan	17-Jan	24-Jan	31-Jan	7-Feb	14-Feb	21-Feb	28-Feb	7-Mar	14-Mar	19-Mar
Stanford	3	3	3	3	2	2	2	2	2	2	2	2	3	2	2	2	2	1
Auburn	6	5	5	7	7	13	16	15	14	14	14	13	10	10	11	10	8	2
Louisiana Tech	2	2	2	1	1	1	1	1	1	1	1	1	1	1	1	1	1	3
Virginia	14	11	11	12	12	11	8	12	9	12	12	12	12	11	14	14	12	4
Tennessee	1	1	1	2	4	7	5	5	3	3	6	5	4	4	3	3	4	5
Texas	5	7	7	6	6	5	4	4	7	5	5	6	5	5	8	8	9	6
Washington	16	14	14	14	14	12	12	8	11	8	8	8	6	6	4	4	3	7
Arkansas	–	–	–	–	–	–	–	–	–	–	–	–	25	24	17	17	21	8
Stephen F. Austin	13	10	10	11	11	14	14	13	12	9	10	10	8	8	7	6	7	9
North Carolina St.	7	9	9	10	10	8	11	11	13	13	13	11	9	9	9	9	11	10
Providence	–	–	–	–	–	24	23	20	25	–	–	–	24	23	23	21	20	11
Ole Miss	15	20	20	18	24	–	–	–	–	–	–	–	21	–	–	–	–	12
Georgia	4	4	4	4	3	3	3	3	4	7	3	3	7	7	6	7	6	13
Purdue	8	13	13	9	9	10	9	7	6	10	9	9	13	14	16	16	14	14
UNLV	10	12	12	13	13	9	6	6	5	4	4	4	2	3	5	5	5	15
South Carolina	20	17	17	21	20	18	17	18	17	15	15	19	19	21	18	18	19	16
Vanderbilt	22	19	19	17	17	17	22	24	20	25	–	24	–	–	–	–	–	17
Iowa	11	6	6	5	5	4	7	9	10	11	11	15	14	13	12	11	10	18
Clemson	–	–	–	–	–	–	–	–	–	–	–	25	–	–	–	–	–	19
Long Beach St.	9	8	8	8	8	6	10	10	8	6	7	7	11	12	10	13	15	20
Northern Ill.	–	–	–	–	–	–	–	–	–	–	24	23	23	22	20	19	16	21
Northwestern	–	–	–	–	–	–	–	–	–	19	19	16	15	16	13	12	13	22
Southern Miss.	–	–	–	25	21	21	20	22	21	18	18	18	17	17	19	20	18	23
Hawaii	–	25	25	22	19	19	18	17	19	16	17	17	16	15	15	15	17	24
Tennessee Tech	18	24	24	23	22	20	19	19	18	20	20	21	20	18	22	22	22	25
DePaul	–	21	21	19	25	25	–	–	–	–	–	–	–	–	–	–	–	–
Kentucky	–	–	–	–	–	–	25	–	–	–	–	–	–	–	–	–	–	–
LSU	12	16	16	16	16	16	15	16	16	17	16	14	18	19	21	24	25	–
Maryland	17	15	15	15	15	15	13	14	15	23	22	–	–	–	–	–	–	–
Ohio St.	–	23	23	–	–	–	–	–	–	–	–	–	–	–	–	–	–	–
Old Dominion	19	18	18	24	23	22	21	21	23	24	25	–	–	–	–	–	–	–
Oregon	25	–	–	–	–	–	–	–	–	–	–	–	–	–	–	–	–	–
Penn St.	23	–	–	–	–	–	–	25	22	22	23	22	–	–	25	–	23	–
Saint Joseph's	21	22	22	20	18	23	24	23	24	21	21	20	22	20	24	23	–	–
UConn	–	–	–	–	–	–	–	–	–	–	–	–	–	25	–	25	24	–
Western Ky.	24	–	–	–	–	–	–	–	–	–	–	–	–	–	–	–	–	–
