= 1990 NCAA Division I women's basketball tournament =

American college basketball tournament

- Teams: 48
- Finals site: Thompson–Boling Arena, Knoxville, Tennessee
- Champions: Stanford Cardinal (1st title, 1st title game, 1st Final Four)
- Runner-up: Auburn Tigers (3rd title game, 3rd Final Four)
- Semifinalists: Virginia Cavaliers (1st Final Four); Louisiana Tech Lady Techsters (7th Final Four)
- Winning coach: Tara VanDerveer (1st title)
- MOP: Jennifer Azzi (Stanford)

The 1990 NCAA Division I women's basketball tournament began on March 11 and ended on April 1. The tournament featured 48 teams. The Final Four consisted of Virginia, Stanford, Auburn, and Louisiana Tech, with Stanford defeating Auburn 88–81 to win its first NCAA title. Stanford's Jennifer Azzi was named the Most Outstanding Player of the tournament.

== Notable events ==
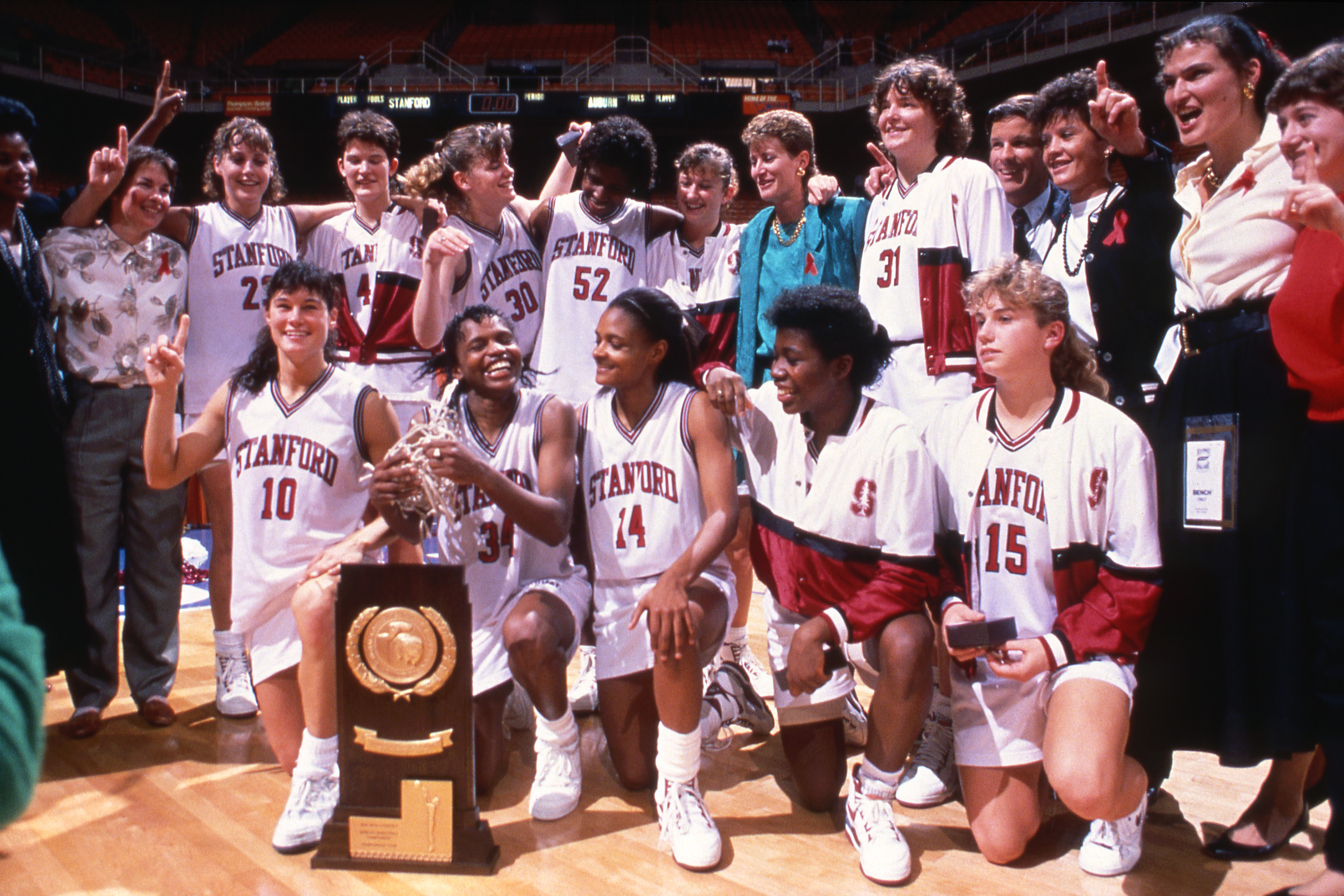
Stanford Cardinal team with National Championship Trophy

Forty-eight teams started the tournament on the eleventh of March. Thirteen days later, there were four team left, Virginia, Auburn, Louisiana Tech and Stanford, headed to Knoxville, Tennessee for the Final Four.

Stanford, after playing in the initial 1982 tournament, did not qualify between 1983 and 1987, but had reached the Sweet Sixteen in 1988, and the Elite Eight in 1989. Virginia was competing in their seventh consecutive NCAA tournament, finishing as high as the Elite Eight in 1988. However, they had been knocked out of the tournament by Tennessee in each of the last three tournaments.

Auburn, coached by Joe Ciampi, had been to all but one of the NCAA tournaments, and reached the last two Final Fours, but finished in the Runner-up position in each year. Louisiana Tech had not just played in every NCAA tournament, but had reached at least the Elite Eight every year, and had two national championships.

For the fourth consecutive year, Virginia faced Tennessee in the tournament. The previous three match ups were all won by Tennessee, including an 80–37 win in the 1989 tournament. This time, led by Dawn Staley who would win the MVP for her performance in the East Regional, the Cavaliers took the Volunteers to overtime, and won 79–75. Virginia next faced Stanford, who had only lost one game all season, and reached the final four by beating Arkansas 114–87 in the West Regional. Stanford wouldn't lose this game, and prevailed over Virginia 75–66.

In the other semi-final game, Auburn faced Louisiana Tech. Auburn came into the tournament as the prior year's runner-up, but was a two seed in the bracket with Washington, the only team to beat Stanford during the regular season. Auburn won easily, beating the Huskies 76–50. The Tech team, only two years removed from their last national championship, were a 1 seed and beat Texas to advance to the Final Four. Auburn was too strong for the Lady Techsters, and advanced to the championship game with an 81–69 victory.

Over twenty thousand people bought tickets for the championship game in Knoxville, the largest crowd ever (at the time) to watch a women's basketball game. In 1985, Stanford head coach Tara VanDerveer had traveled to Knoxville to meet with the family of Jennifer Azzi, to try to persuade Azzi to come to Stanford. Despite finishing 9–19 the year before, VanDerveer talked about competing for a national championship, Azzi came to Stanford, and four years later, was twenty miles from her Oak Ridge hometown, playing for the national championship. Auburn, led by Caroline Jones, pulled out to a nine-point lead in the first half. Then Azzi, who had not been able to even take a shot in the first eleven minutes, took over. She brought the team to a tie at halftime, and helped lead a 9–2 run early in the second half to take over the game. Azzi would win the tournament award for the most outstanding player, and her teammate Katy Steding set three point shooting records to help Stanford win their first national championship 88–81, while Auburn would finish as runner-up for the third consecutive year.

== Records ==
Katy Steding set the Final Four record for both three points field goal attempts (15) and three point field goals made (6), in the championship game against Auburn.

Stanford set the NCAA Women's Tournament record for assist in a single games, with 37 assists in their regional final game against Arkansas.

== Qualifying teams – automatic ==
Forty-eight teams were selected to participate in the 1990 NCAA Tournament. Twenty-one conferences were eligible for an automatic bid to the 1990 NCAA tournament.

Automatic bids
		Record		
Qualifying School	Conference	Regular Season	Conference	Seed
Appalachian State University	SoCon	20–8	7–3	11
Auburn University	SEC	24–6	7–2	2
Bowling Green State University	MAC	22–8	12–4	12
University of Iowa	Big Ten	23–5	15–3	3
Louisiana Tech University	American South	29–0	10–0	1
Manhattan College	MAAC	18–12	8–2	12
University of Montana	Big Sky	27–2	16–0	8
Oklahoma State University–Stillwater	Big Eight	20–10	9–5	7
Old Dominion University	Sun Belt	20–9	4–2	8
Pennsylvania State University	Atlantic 10	24–6	15–3	7
Providence College	Big East	26–4	14–2	3
University of Richmond	CAA	25–4	11–1	10
Southern Illinois University Carbondale	Gateway	21–9	16–2	11
University of Southern Mississippi	Metro	26–4	11–3	8
Stanford University	Pac-10	27–1	17–1	1
Stephen F. Austin State University	Southland	27–2	14–0	3
Tennessee Technological University	Ohio Valley Conference	25–4	12–0	7
University of Texas at Austin	Southwest	25–4	15–1	3
University of Nevada, Las Vegas	Big West	27–2	17–1	4
University of Utah	High Country	20–9	6–4	12
University of Virginia	ACC	26–5	11–3	2

== Qualifying teams – at-large ==
Twenty-seven additional teams were selected to complete the forty-eight invitations.

At-large Bids
		Record		
Qualifying School	Conference	Regular Season	Conference	Seed
University of Arkansas	Southwest	22–4	15–1	7
University of California, Berkeley	Pacific-10	17–11	9–9	11
Clemson University	ACC	20–9	10–4	5
University of Connecticut	Big East	25–5	14–2	4
DePaul University	North Star	21–9	10–2	8
Florida State University	Metro	21–8	11–3	10
University of Georgia	SEC	25–4	6–3	2
University of Hawaiʻi at Mānoa	Big West	25–3	16–2	9
California State University, Long Beach	Big West	24–7	14–4	6
Louisiana State University	SEC	21–8	4–5	9
University of Maryland, College Park	ACC	18–10	7–7	6
University of Michigan	Big Ten	19–9	11–7	10
University of Mississippi (Ole Miss)	SEC	20–9	7–2	5
North Carolina State University	ACC	24–5	12–2	2
Northern Illinois University	North Star	25–4	12–0	5
Northwestern University	Big Ten	24–4	15–3	4
Ohio State University	Big Ten	17–11	11–7	6
Purdue University	Big Ten	22–6	14–4	4
Rutgers University	Big East	20–9	16–2	11
University of South Carolina	Metro	22–8	13–1	5
Saint Joseph's University	Atlantic 10	24–6	16–2	9
University of Tennessee	SEC	25–5	8–1	1
Texas Tech University	Southwest	19–10	11–5	12
University of California, Los Angeles	Pacific-10	17–11	12–6	10
Vanderbilt University	SEC	21–10	5–4	6
University of Washington	Pacific-10	26–2	17–1	1
Western Kentucky University	Sun Belt	17–11	4–2	9

== Bids by conference ==
Twenty-one conferences earned an automatic bid. In eleven cases, the automatic bid was the only representative from the conference. Two conferences (North Star, Big West) sent two representatives as an at-large team. Twenty-four additional at-large teams were selected from ten of the conferences.

Bids	Conference	Teams
6	SEC	Auburn, Georgia, LSU, Ole Miss, Tennessee, Vanderbilt
5	Big Ten	Iowa, Michigan, Northwestern, Ohio State, Purdue
4	ACC	Virginia, Clemson, Maryland, North Carolina State
4	Pacific-10	Stanford, California, UCLA, Washington
3	Big East	Providence, Connecticut, Rutgers
3	Metro	Southern Miss, Florida State, South Carolina
3	Southwest	Texas, Arkansas, Texas Tech
2	Atlantic 10	Penn State, Saint Joseph's
3	Big West	UNLV, Hawaii, Long Beach State
2	North Star	DePaul, Northern Illinois
2	Sun Belt	Old Dominion, Western Kentucky
1	American South	Louisiana Tech
1	Big Eight	Oklahoma State
1	Big Sky	Montana
1	CAA	Richmond
1	Gateway	Southern Illinois
1	High Country	Utah
1	MAAC	Manhattan
1	Mid-American	Bowling Green
1	Ohio Valley	Tennessee Tech
1	Southern	Appalachian State
1	Southland	Stephen F. Austin

== First and second rounds ==
1990 NCAA first round
1990 NCAA second round

In 1990, the field remained at 48 teams. The teams were seeded, and assigned to four geographic regions, with seeds 1–12 in each region. In Round 1, seeds 8 and 9 faced each other for the opportunity to face the 1 seed in the second round, seeds 7 and 10 played for the opportunity to face the 2 seed, seeds 5 and 12 played for the opportunity to face the 4 seed, and seeds 6 and 11 played for the opportunity to face the 3 seed. In the first two rounds, the higher seed was given the opportunity to host the first-round game. In most cases, the higher seed accepted the opportunity. The exception:

- Seventh seeded Penn State played tenth seeded Florida State at Florida State

The following table lists the region, host school, venue and the thirty-two first and second round locations:

Region	Rnd	Host	Venue	City	State
East	1	Clemson University	Littlejohn Coliseum	Clemson	South Carolina
East	1	Florida State University	Tully Gymnasium	Tallahassee	Florida
East	1	Old Dominion University	Old Dominion University Fieldhouse	Norfolk	Virginia
East	1	University of Maryland	Cole Field House	College Park	Maryland
East	2	Providence College	Alumni Hall (Providence)	Providence	Rhode Island
East	2	University of Connecticut	Harry A. Gampel Pavilion	Storrs	Connecticut
East	2	University of Tennessee	Thompson-Boling Arena	Knoxville	Tennessee
East	2	University of Virginia	University Hall (University of Virginia)	Charlottesville	Virginia
Mideast	1	DePaul University	Alumni Hall (DePaul University)	Chicago	Illinois
Mideast	1	University of South Carolina	Carolina Coliseum	Columbia	South Carolina
Mideast	1	Tennessee Tech	Eblen Center	Cookeville	Tennessee
Mideast	1	Vanderbilt University	Memorial Gymnasium (Vanderbilt University)	Nashville	Tennessee
Mideast	2	Auburn University	Memorial Coliseum (Beard–Eaves–Memorial Coliseum)	Auburn	Alabama
Mideast	2	Northwestern University	Welsh-Ryan Arena	Evanston	Illinois
Mideast	2	University of Iowa	Carver–Hawkeye Arena	Iowa City	Iowa
Mideast	2	University of Washington	Hec Edmundson Pavilion	Seattle	Washington
Midwest	1	Northern Illinois University	Chick Evans Field House	DeKalb	Illinois
Midwest	1	Ohio State University	St. John Arena	Columbus	Ohio
Midwest	1	University of Southern Mississippi	Reed Green Coliseum	Hattiesburg	Mississippi
Midwest	1	Oklahoma State University	Gallagher-Iba Arena	Stillwater	Oklahoma
Midwest	2	Louisiana Tech University	Thomas Assembly Center	Ruston	Louisiana
Midwest	2	North Carolina State University	Reynolds Coliseum	Raleigh	North Carolina
Midwest	2	University of Texas	Frank Erwin Center	Austin	Texas
Midwest	2	Purdue University	Mackey Arena	West Lafayette	Indiana
West	1	Long Beach State	University Gym (Gold Mine)	Long Beach	California
West	1	University of Mississippi (Ole Miss)	Tad Smith Coliseum	Oxford	Mississippi
West	1	University of Montana	Dahlberg Arena	Missoula	Montana
West	1	University of Arkansas	Barnhill Arena	Fayetteville	Arkansas
West	2	University of Georgia	Georgia Coliseum (Stegeman Coliseum)	Athens	Georgia
West	2	Stanford University	Maples Pavilion	Stanford	California
West	2	University of Nevada, Las Vegas	South Gym	Paradise	Nevada
West	2	Stephen F. Austin University	William R. Johnson Coliseum	Nacogdoches	Texas

== Regionals and Final Four ==
1990 NCAA regionals and Final Four

The regionals, named for the general location, were held from March 22 to March 24 at these sites:

- East Regional E.A. Diddle Arena, Bowling Green, Kentucky (Host: Western Kentucky University)
- Mideast Regional Memorial Coliseum (Beard–Eaves–Memorial Coliseum), Auburn, Alabama (Host: Auburn University)
- Midwest Regional Thomas Assembly Center, Ruston, Louisiana (Host: Louisiana Tech University)
- West Regional Maples Pavilion, Stanford, California (Host: Stanford University)

Each regional winner advanced to the Final Four, held March 30 and April 1 in Knoxville, Tennessee at the Thompson-Boling Arena (Host: University of Tennessee)

== Bids by state ==
The forty-eight teams came from thirty states. California and Illinois had the most teams with four each. Twenty states did not have any teams receiving bids.

NCAA Women's basketball Tournament invitations by state 1990

Bids	State	Teams
4	California	Stanford, California, Long Beach St., UCLA
4	Illinois	Southern Ill., DePaul, Northern Ill., Northwestern
3	Tennessee	Tennessee Tech, Tennessee, Vanderbilt
3	Texas	Stephen F. Austin, Texas, Texas Tech
3	Virginia	Old Dominion, Richmond, Virginia
2	Louisiana	Louisiana Tech, LSU
2	Mississippi	Ole Miss, Southern Miss.
2	North Carolina	Appalachian St., North Carolina St.
2	Ohio	Bowling Green, Ohio St.
2	Pennsylvania	Penn St., St. Joseph's
2	South Carolina	Clemson, South Carolina
1	Alabama	Auburn
1	Arkansas	Arkansas
1	Connecticut	Connecticut
1	Florida	Florida St.
1	Georgia	Georgia
1	Hawaii	Hawaii
1	Indiana	Purdue
1	Iowa	Iowa
1	Kentucky	Western Ky.
1	Maryland	Maryland
1	Michigan	Michigan
1	Montana	Montana
1	Nevada	UNLV
1	New Jersey	Rutgers
1	New York	Manhattan
1	Oklahoma	Oklahoma St.
1	Rhode Island	Providence
1	Utah	Utah
1	Washington	Washington

== Brackets ==
First- and second-round games played at higher seed except where noted.

=== East regional – Norfolk, VA ===
First round March 14
8	Old Dominion	91
9	St. Joseph's	69
5	Clemson	79
12	Manhattan	55
7	Penn St.	83
10	at Florida St.	73
6	Maryland	100
11	Appalachian St.	71

Second round March 17–18
1	Tennessee	87
8	Old Dominion	68
4	Connecticut	59
5	Clemson	61
2	Virginia	85
7	Penn St.	64
3	Providence	77
6	Maryland	75

Regional semifinals March 22
1	Tennessee	80
5	Clemson	62
2	Virginia	77
3	Providence	71

Regional finals March 24
1	Tennessee	75
2	Virginia	79 (OT)

=== West regional – Stanford, CA ===
First round March 14
8	Montana	78
9	Hawaii	83
5	Ole Miss	74
12	Utah	51
7	Arkansas	90
10	UCLA	80 (OT)
6	Long Beach St.	87
11	California	84

Second round March 17–18
1	Stanford	106
9	Hawaii	76
4	UNLV	62
5	Ole Miss	66
2	Georgia	70
7	Arkansas	81
3	Stephen F. Austin	78
6	Long Beach St.	62

Regional semifinals March 22
1	Stanford	78
5	Ole Miss	65
7	Arkansas	87
3	Stephen F. Austin	82

Regional finals March 24
1	Stanford	114
7	Arkansas	87

=== Mideast regional – Iowa City, IA ===
First round March 14
8	DePaul	73
9	Western Kentucky	63
5	South Carolina	93
12	Bowling Green	50
7	Tennessee Tech	77
10	Richmond	59
6	Vanderbilt	78
11	Rutgers	75

Second round March 17–18
1	Washington	77
8	DePaul	68
4	Northwestern	67
5	South Carolina	76
2	Auburn	73
7	Tennessee Tech	54
3	Iowa	56
6	Vanderbilt	61

Regional semifinals March 22
1	Washington	73
5	South Carolina	61
2	Auburn	89
6	Vanderbilt	67

Regional finals March 24
1	Washington	50
2	Auburn	76

=== Midwest regional – Austin, Texas ===
First round March 14
8	Southern Miss	75
9	LSU	65
5	Northern Illinois	84
12	Texas Tech	63
7	Oklahoma St.	68
10	Michigan	77
6	Ohio St.	73
11	Southern Illinois	61

Second round March 17–18
1	Louisiana Tech	89
8	Southern Miss	70
4	Purdue	86
5	Northern Illinois	81
2	North Carolina St.	81
10	Michigan	64
3	Texas	95
6	Ohio St.	66

Regional semifinals March 22
1	Louisiana Tech	91
4	Purdue	47
2	North Carolina St.	63
3	Texas	72

Regional finals March 24
1	Louisiana Tech	71
3	Texas	57

=== Final Four – Knoxville, TN ===
National semifinals March 30
2E	Virginia	66
1W	Stanford	75
2ME	Auburn	81
1MW	Louisiana Tech	69

National championship April 1
1W	Stanford	88
2ME	Auburn	81

== Record by conference ==
Fifteen conferences had more than one bid, or at least one win in NCAA Tournament play:

Conference	# of Bids	Record	Win %	Round of 32	Sweet Sixteen	Elite Eight	Final Four	Championship Game
Southeastern	6	10–6	.625	5	4	2	1	1
Big Ten	5	3–5	.375	5	1	–	–	–
Atlantic Coast	4	7–4	.636	4	3	1	1	–
Pacific-10	4	7–3	.700	2	2	2	1	1
Southwest	3	5–3	.625	2	2	2	–	–
Metro	3	3–3	.500	2	1	–	–	–
Big East	3	1–3	.250	2	1	–	–	–
North Star	2	2–2	.500	2	–	–	–	–
Atlantic 10	2	1–2	.333	1	–	–	–	–
Big West	3	2–3	.400	3	–	–	–	–
Sun Belt	2	1–2	.333	1	–	–	–	–
American South	1	3–1	.750	1	1	1	1	–
Ohio Valley	1	1–1	.500	1	–	–	–	–
Pacific Coast	1	1–1	.500	1	–	–	–	–
Southland	1	1–1	.500	1	1	–	–	–

Eight conferences went 0-1: Big Eight, Big Sky Conference, Colonial, Gateway, MAAC, MAC, Southern Conference, and WAC

== All-Tournament team ==
- Jennifer Azzi, Stanford
- Katy Steding, Stanford
- Carolyn Jones, Auburn
- Chantel Tremitiere, Auburn
- Venus Lacy, Louisiana Tech

== Game officials ==
- Patty Broderick (semifinal)
- June Courteau (semifinal)
- Sue Kennedy (semifinal)
- Bob Trammel (semifinal)
- Sally Bell (final)
- Art Bomengen (final)

== See also ==
- 1990 NCAA Division I men's basketball tournament
- 1990 NCAA Division II women's basketball tournament
- 1990 NCAA Division III women's basketball tournament
- 1990 NAIA women's basketball tournament
