= 2007 SEC women's basketball tournament =

American college basketball postseason tournament

- Classification: Division I
- Teams: 12
- Site: Arena at Gwinnett Center; Duluth, Georgia
- Champions: Vanderbilt Commodores (5th title)
- Winning coach: Melanie Balcomb (2nd title)
- MVP: Carla Thomas (Vanderbilt)
- Attendance: 33,882

2006–07 SEC women's basketball standings
	Conf.				Overall
Team	W		L	PCT	W		L	PCT
No. 3 Tennessee	14	–	0	1.000	34	–	3	.919
No. 13 Georgia	11	–	3	.786	27	–	7	.794
No. 7 Vanderbilt^{†}	10	–	4	.714	28	–	6	.824
No. 12 LSU	10	–	4	.714	30	–	8	.789
Ole Miss	9	–	5	.643	24	–	11	.686
Mississippi State	7	–	7	.500	18	–	14	.563
Kentucky	6	–	8	.429	20	–	14	.588
South Carolina	6	–	8	.429	18	–	15	.545
Auburn	6	–	8	.429	21	–	13	.618
Arkansas	3	–	11	.214	18	–	13	.581
Florida	2	–	12	.143	9	–	22	.290
Alabama	0	–	14	.000	10	–	20	.333
† 2007 SEC tournament winner Rankings from AP poll

The 2007 SEC women's basketball tournament took place March 1–4, 2007 in Duluth, Georgia at the Arena at Gwinnett Center.

Vanderbilt won the tournament and received the SEC's automatic bid to the 2007 NCAA women's basketball tournament by beating LSU on March 4, 2007 by the score of 51 to 45.

== Seeds ==
Seed	School	Conference record	Overall record
1	Tennessee^{‡†}	14-0	34-3
2	Georgia^{†}	11-3	27-7
3	Vanderbilt^{†}	10-4	28-6
4	LSU^{†}	10-4	30-8
5	Ole Miss	9-5	24-11
6	Mississippi State	7-7	18-14
7	Kentucky	6-8	20-14
8	South Carolina	6-8	18-15
9	Auburn	6-8	21-13
10	Arkansas	3-11	18-13
11	Florida	2-12	9-22
12	Alabama	0-14	10-20
‡ – SEC regular season champions, and tournament No. 1 seed. † – Received a single-bye in the conference tournament. Overall records include all games played in the SEC Tournament.

== Tournament ==
First round
9	Auburn	63
8	South Carolina	65
12	Alabama	49
5	Ole Miss	78
11	Florida	69
6	Mississippi State	63
10	Arkansas	59
7	Kentucky	72

Second round
8	South Carolina	63
1	Tennessee	81
5	Ole Miss	46
4	LSU	52
11	Florida	77
3	Vanderbilt	105
7	Kentucky	40
2	Georgia	72

Semifinals
4	LSU	63
1	Tennessee	54
3	Vanderbilt	81
2	Georgia	56

Championship game
4	LSU	45
3	Vanderbilt	51

Asterisk denotes game ended in overtime.

== All-Tournament team ==
- Sylvia Fowles, LSU
- RaShonta LeBlanc, LSU
- Erica White, LSU
- Alexis Hornbuckle, Tennessee
- Christina Wirth, Vanderbilt
- Carla Thomas, Vanderbilt (MVP)
