= 2006–07 NCAA Division I women's basketball rankings =

- Season: 2006–07
- NCAA Tournament: 2007
- Preseason No. 1: Maryland
- NCAA Tournament Champions: Tennessee
NCAA Division I women's basketball rankings


Two human polls comprise the 2006–07 NCAA Division I women's basketball rankings, the AP Poll and the Coaches Poll, in addition to various publications' preseason polls. The AP poll is currently a poll of sportswriters, while the USA Today Coaches' Poll is a poll of college coaches. The AP conducts polls weekly through the end of the regular season and conference play, while the Coaches poll conducts a final, post-NCAA tournament poll as well.

== Legend ==
–	No votes
(#)	Ranking

== AP Poll ==
Team	8-Nov	13-Nov	20-Nov	27-Nov	4-Dec	11-Dec	18-Dec	26-Dec	2-Jan	8-Jan	16-Jan	22-Jan	29-Jan	5-Feb	13-Feb	20-Feb	26-Feb	5-Mar	12-Mar
Duke	6	6	5	5	4	4	4	3	3	3	1	1	1	1	1	1	1	1	1
North Carolina	2	2	2	2	2	2	2	2	2	2	2	2	2	2	2	4	4	3	2
Tennessee	5	5	4	4	6	5	5	4	4	4	4	4	3	3	3	2	2	4	3
UConn	8	8	7	7	7	6	6	5	5	7	6	7	6	5	5	3	3	2	4
Stanford	4	4	11	15	14	14	14	14	12	10	9	9	8	11	9	8	7	6	5
Maryland	1	1	1	1	1	1	1	1	1	1	3	3	4	6	6	6	6	7	6
Vanderbilt	16	15	14	12	11	12	12	12	11	14	14	15	15	14	12	12	13	9	7
Ohio St.	7	7	6	6	5	8	8	7	7	6	5	5	5	4	4	5	5	5	8
Oklahoma	3	3	3	3	3	3	3	8	8	8	7	6	9	12	14	13	12	11	9
Arizona St.	13	11	13	14	13	10	10	10	T13	11	10	10	12	10	10	10	9	8	10
Purdue	11	12	10	9	10	13	13	13	10	13	12	12	10	13	16	15	15	12	11
LSU	10	10	9	11	9	7	7	6	6	5	8	8	7	7	7	7	11	10	12
Georgia	9	9	8	8	8	11	11	11	15	15	16	14	14	9	11	11	10	14	13
George Washington	–	–	23	21	21	20	19	17	16	12	11	11	11	8	8	9	8	15	14
Rutgers	12	14	18	18	19	–	–	–	–	–	–	–	23	22	23	21	18	19	15
Texas A&M	14	13	12	10	15	19	18	16	17	19	17	21	18	16	13	16	14	13	16
Middle Tenn.	–	–	–	–	–	–	–	–	–	21	20	19	20	19	17	17	17	16	17
North Carolina St.	–	–	–	–	–	–	–	–	–	–	–	–	–	–	–	–	24	17	18
Baylor	19	16	15	13	12	9	9	9	9	9	13	13	13	15	15	14	16	18	19
Bowling Green	–	–	–	–	–	–	25	25	24	18	18	16	17	18	18	18	19	20	20
Green Bay	–	–	–	–	–	–	–	–	–	–	–	–	24	24	–	24	21	22	21
Marquette	–	–	–	–	24	21	21	20	18	16	19	17	16	23	21	19	23	21	22
Michigan St.	17	17	17	20	20	18	20	21	19	20	23	23	–	–	24	20	22	24	23
Iowa St.	–	–	–	–	–	–	–	–	–	–	–	–	–	–	–	–	–	–	24
Louisville	–	–	24	19	17	16	16	15	T13	17	15	18	19	17	20	23	20	23	25
Arkansas	–	–	–	–	–	25	24	23	20	25	–	–	–	–	–	–	–	–	–
BYU	24	22	22	23	–	–	–	–	–	–	–	–	–	–	–	–	–	–	–
California	21	18	16	16	16	15	15	18	21	22	21	20	21	20	22	–	25	–	–
DePaul	20	T23	19	17	18	17	17	19	23	24	–	–	–	–	–	–	–	–	–
James Madison	–	–	–	–	–	–	–	–	–	–	–	–	25	25	25	22	–	–	–
Kansas St.	–	–	–	–	–	–	–	–	–	–	25	–	–	–	–	–	–	–	–
Kentucky	15	21	20	24	–	–	–	–	–	–	–	–	–	–	–	–	–	–	–
Montana	–	–	–	–	–	–	–	–	–	–	–	–	–	–	–	–	–	25	–
Nebraska	–	–	–	–	25	–	–	–	–	–	–	25	22	21	19	25	–	–	–
New Mexico	18	T23	–	–	23	22	23	22	25	–	–	–	–	–	–	–	–	–	–
Ole Miss	–	–	–	–	–	–	–	–	–	–	24	22	–	–	–	–	–	–	–
Pittsburgh	–	–	–	–	–	24	22	24	22	–	–	–	–	–	–	–	–	–	–
Southern California	22	19	–	–	–	–	–	–	–	–	–	–	–	–	–	–	–	–	–
Texas	25	25	25	22	22	23	–	–	–	23	22	24	–	–	–	–	–	–	–
Texas Tech	–	–	–	25	–	–	–	–	–	–	–	–	–	–	–	–	–	–	–
UCLA	23	20	21	–	–	–	–	–	–	–	–	–	–	–	–	–	–	–	–

== USA Today Coaches poll ==
Team	13-Nov	20-Nov	27-Nov	4-Dec	11-Dec	18-Dec	25-Dec	1-Jan	8-Jan	15-Jan	22-Jan	29-Jan	5-Feb	12-Feb	19-Feb	26-Feb	5-Mar	11-Mar	4-Apr
Tennessee	4	4	4	5	5	5	4	4	4	4	4	3	3	3	2	2	4	4	1
Rutgers	12	18	17	21	–	–	–	–	–	–	–	25	23	23	22	T21	19	18	2
North Carolina	2	2	2	2	2	2	2	2	2	2	2	2	2	2	4	4	3	2	3
LSU	9	9	11	10	7	7	6	6	6	8	8	7	7	7	7	10	10	11	4
UConn	7	7	7	7	6	6	5	5	5	5	5	5	4	4	3	3	2	3	5
Duke	5	5	5	4	4	4	3	3	3	1	1	1	1	1	1	1	1	1	6
Purdue	13	10	9	9	13	13	13	11	13	14	13	13	13	15	15	14	12	12	7
Arizona St.	11	12	12	13	11	10	11	14	11	10	10	10	8	8	8	7	8	9	8
Oklahoma	3	3	3	3	3	3	7	7	7	6	6	8	T9	11	11	11	11	10	9
Ole Miss	–	–	–	–	–	–	–	–	–	–	T25	–	–	–	–	–	–	–	10
George Washington	25	21	20	19	20	18	16	16	14	13	12	12	T9	9	9	9	13	13	11
North Carolina St.	–	–	–	–	–	–	–	–	–	–	–	–	–	–	–	25	20	20	12
Georgia	8	8	8	8	10	11	10	15	15	16	15	14	12	12	T12	12	14	14	13
Maryland	1	1	1	1	1	1	1	1	1	3	3	4	6	6	5	5	5	6	14
Bowling Green	–	–	24	T22	21	21	21	19	18	17	16	16	17	17	16	18	18	19	15
Stanford	10	11	15	15	15	15	15	12	10	9	9	9	11	10	10	8	6	5	16
Vanderbilt	15	14	14	11	12	12	12	10	12	11	14	15	14	13	T12	13	9	8	17
Ohio St.	6	6	6	6	8	8	8	8	8	7	7	6	5	5	6	6	7	7	18
Florida St.	–	–	–	25	23	–	–	–	–	–	–	–	–	–	–	–	–	–	19
Baylor	16	15	13	12	9	9	9	9	9	12	11	11	15	14	14	15	17	17	20
Texas A&M	14	13	10	14	19	19	17	17	19	18	20	20	19	16	18	16	15	15	21
Marist	–	–	–	–	–	–	–	–	–	–	–	–	–	–	–	–	–	–	22
Middle Tenn.	–	–	–	–	–	–	–	25	21	20	19	19	18	18	17	17	16	16	23
Louisville	–	25	19	16	14	14	14	13	16	15	17	17	16	19	21	T21	24	24	24
Michigan St.	17	16	18	18	17	20	20	18	20	21	21	23	24	24	20	23	23	23	25
Arkansas	–	–	–	–	–	24	24	23	–	–	–	–	–	–	–	–	–	–	–
Boston College	–	22	–	–	–	–	–	–	–	–	–	–	–	–	–	–	–	–	–
BYU	18	23	22	–	–	–	–	–	–	–	–	–	–	–	–	–	–	–	–
California	19	17	16	17	16	16	19	21	22	22	22	21	20	22	–	24	25	–	–
DePaul	22	20	21	20	18	17	18	24	24	–	–	–	–	–	–	–	–	–	–
Green Bay	–	–	–	–	–	–	–	–	–	–	–	24	25	25	23	20	22	22	–
Iowa St.	–	–	–	–	–	–	–	–	–	–	–	–	–	–	–	–	–	25	–
James Madison	–	–	–	–	–	–	–	–	–	–	–	–	–	–	25	–	–	–	–
Kentucky	24	24	–	–	–	–	–	–	–	–	–	–	–	–	–	–	–	–	–
Marquette	–	–	–	–	25	23	22	20	17	19	18	18	22	21	19	19	21	21	–
Nebraska	–	–	–	–	–	–	–	–	–	–	T25	22	21	20	24	–	–	–	–
New Mexico	–	–	–	–	–	25	25	–	–	–	–	–	–	–	–	–	–	–	–
Pittsburgh	–	–	–	24	22	22	23	22	23	25	23	–	–	–	–	–	–	–	–
Southern California	20	–	–	–	–	–	–	–	–	–	–	–	–	–	–	–	–	–	–
TCU	–	–	–	–	–	–	–	–	25	23	–	–	–	–	–	–	–	–	–
Texas	–	–	25	T22	24	–	–	–	–	24	24	–	–	–	–	–	–	–	–
Texas Tech	–	–	23	–	–	–	–	–	–	–	–	–	–	–	–	–	–	–	–
UCLA	21	19	–	–	–	–	–	–	–	–	–	–	–	–	–	–	–	–	–
Washington	23	–	–	–	–	–	–	–	–	–	–	–	–	–	–	–	–	–	–
