= 2006–07 LSU Lady Tigers basketball team =

Intercollegiate basketball season

2006–07 LSU Lady Tigers basketball

NCAA Women's Tournament, Final Four
- Conference: Southeastern Conference

Ranking
- Coaches: No. 4
- AP: No. 12
- Record: 30–8 (10–4 SEC)
- Head coach: Pokey Chatman (3rd season); Bob Starkey (interim)
- Assistant coaches: Christie Sides; Carla Berry
- Home arena: Pete Maravich Assembly Center

2006–07 SEC women's basketball standings
	Conf.				Overall
Team	W		L	PCT	W		L	PCT
No. 3 Tennessee	14	–	0	1.000	34	–	3	.919
No. 13 Georgia	11	–	3	.786	27	–	7	.794
No. 7 Vanderbilt^{†}	10	–	4	.714	28	–	6	.824
No. 12 LSU	10	–	4	.714	30	–	8	.789
Ole Miss	9	–	5	.643	24	–	11	.686
Mississippi State	7	–	7	.500	18	–	14	.563
Kentucky	6	–	8	.429	20	–	14	.588
South Carolina	6	–	8	.429	18	–	15	.545
Auburn	6	–	8	.429	21	–	13	.618
Arkansas	3	–	11	.214	18	–	13	.581
Florida	2	–	12	.143	9	–	22	.290
Alabama	0	–	14	.000	10	–	20	.333
† 2007 SEC tournament winner Rankings from AP poll

The 2006–07 LSU Lady Tigers basketball team represented Louisiana State University during the 2006–07 NCAA Division I women's basketball season college basketball season. The Lady Tigers, were led by third-year head coach Pokey Chatman before her resignation prior to the NCAA tournament. Interim coach Bob Starkey guided the team for the final five games. LSU played their home games at Pete Maravich Assembly Center and were members of the Southeastern Conference. They finished the season 30–8, 10–4 in SEC play to finish tied for third in the conference regular season standings. As the four seed in the SEC women's tournament, they lost in the championship game to Vanderbilt. They received an at-large bid to the NCAA women's tournament as the No. 3 seed in the Fresno (FRS) region. The Lady Tigers defeated UNC Ashville, West Virginia, Florida State, and No. 1 seed UConn to reach the Final Four for the fourth consecutive season. LSU was beaten in the National semifinals by Rutgers.

== Roster ==
2006–07 LSU Tigers women's basketball team
Players
Coaches

Pos.	#	Name	Height	Year	Previous school	Hometown
G	4	Katie Antony	5 ft 10 in (1.78 m)	Jr	Anacoco; Vanderbilt	Anacoco, LA
G	5	Erica White	5 ft 4 in (1.63 m)	Jr	Ribault	Jacksonville, FL
G	10	Khaliah Mitchell	5 ft 11 in (1.8 m)	Jr	St. Mary's	New Orleans, LA
G	12	RaShonta LeBlanc	5 ft 7 in (1.7 m)	Jr	Memorial	Port Arthur, TX
G	15	Quianna Chaney	5 ft 11 in (1.8 m)	Jr	Southern Lab	Baton Rouge, LA
F	22	Porsha Phillips	6 ft 0 in (1.83 m)	Fr	Redan	Stone Mountain, GA
G	23	Allison Hightower	5 ft 10 in (1.78 m)	Fr	Seguin	Dallas, TX
G	24	Marian Whitfield	5 ft 9 in (1.75 m)	Jr	Glenn Hills	Augusta, GA
C	25	Mesha Williams	6 ft 3 in (1.91 m)	Jr	Gateway Tech; Moberly CC	St. Louis, MO
C	34	Sylvia Fowles	6 ft 6 in (1.98 m)	Jr	Miami Edison	Miami, FL
F	44	Kristen Morris	6 ft 2 in (1.88 m)	So	Detroit Country Day	Lathrup Village, MI
F	54	Ashley Thomas	6 ft 0 in (1.83 m)	Jr	Stephenson	Stone Mountain, GA

Head coach

- Pokey Chatman (LSU)
- Bob Starkey

Assistant coach(es)

- Christie Sides
- Carla Berry

Legend

- (C) Team captain
- (S) Suspended
- (I) Ineligible
- (W) Walk-on
- Injured
- Current redshirt

Roster

== Schedule and results ==
Date time, TV	Rank^{#}	Opponent^{#}	Result	Record	Site (attendance) city, state
Exhibition
Nov 1, 2006*		Loyola (LA)	W 90–47		Maravich Assembly Center; Baton Rouge, LA
Nov 7, 2006*		Lake Truck	W 67–39		Maravich Assembly Center; Baton Rouge, LA
Regular season
Nov 12, 2006*	No. 10	West Virginia; Basketball Travelers Classic	W 64–25	1–0	Maravich Assembly Center (3,940); Baton Rouge, LA
Nov 13, 2006*	No. 10	Howard	W 88–44	2–0	Maravich Assembly Center (3,811); Baton Rouge, LA
Nov 14, 2006*	No. 10	Virginia Tech	W 70–40	3–0	Maravich Assembly Center (3,829); Baton Rouge, LA
Nov 16, 2006*	No. 10	Louisiana–Lafayette	W 65–31	4–0	Maravich Assembly Center (3,863); Baton Rouge, LA
Nov 19, 2006*	No. 10	at Tulane	W 59–39	5–0	Fogelman Arena (1,389); New Orleans, LA
Nov 21, 2006*	No. 9	at No. 15 Baylor	L 60–64	5–1	Ferrell Center (7,503); Waco, TX
Nov 24, 2006*	No. 9	vs. Tulsa; UTSA Roadrunner Thanksgiving Classic	W 61–37	6–1	Convocation Center (220); San Antonio, TX
Nov 25, 2006*	No. 9	vs. Eastern Washington; UTSA Roadrunner Thanksgiving Classic	W 105–52	7–1	Convocation Center (220); San Antonio, TX
Nov 27, 2006*	No. 11	at New Orleans	W 65–45	8–1	Human Performance Center (680); New Orleans, LA
Dec 2, 2006*	No. 11	Detroit	W 80–44	9–1	Maravich Assembly Center (3,827); Baton Rouge, LA
Dec 10, 2006*	No. 9	No. 5 Ohio State	W 75–51	10–1	Maravich Assembly Center (10,677); Baton Rouge, LA
Dec 17, 2006*	No. 7	at No. 18 Michigan State	W 65–50	11–1	Breslin Center (7,340); East Lansing, MI
Dec 20, 2006*	No. 7	McNeese State	W 83–28	12–1	Maravich Assembly Center (4,017); Baton Rouge, LA
Dec 30, 2006*	No. 6	vs. Louisiana Tech; Katrina Relief Basketball Classic	W 61–44	13–1	New Orleans Arena (5,584); New Orleans, LA
Jan 3, 2007*	No. 6	at South Florida	W 60–48	14–1	Sun Dome (1,326); Tampa, FL
Jan 7, 2007	No. 6	No. 15 Georgia; Pack the PMAC XI	W 57–55	15–1 (1–0)	Maravich Assembly Center (7,666); Baton Rouge, LA
Jan 11, 2007	No. 5	at Ole Miss	L 74–77	15–2 (1–1)	Tad Smith Coliseum (2,661); Oxford, MS
Jan 14, 2007	No. 5	at Mississippi State	W 77–50	16–2 (2–1)	Humphrey Coliseum (1,256); Starkville, MS
Jan 18, 2007	No. 8	Kentucky	W 76–58	17–2 (3–1)	Maravich Assembly Center (4,268); Baton Rouge, LA
Jan 21, 2007	No. 8	at Alabama	W 61–45	18–2 (4–1)	Coleman Coliseum (1,771); Tuscaloosa, AL
Jan 25, 2007	No. 8	Arkansas	W 70–53	19–2 (5–1)	Maravich Assembly Center (3,986); Baton Rouge, LA
Jan 28, 2007	No. 8	Auburn	W 65–45	20–2 (6–1)	Maravich Assembly Center (5,362); Baton Rouge, LA
Feb 1, 2007	No. 7	at No. 14 Georgia	L 51–53	20–3 (6–2)	Stegeman Coliseum (4,450); Athens, GA
Feb 4, 2007	No. 7	at South Carolina	W 49–46	21–3 (7–2)	Colonial Center (2,076); Columbia, SC
Feb 8, 2007	No. 7	Florida	W 79–66	22–3 (8–2)	Maravich Assembly Center (5,386); Baton Rouge, LA
Feb 11, 2007*	No. 7	No. 5 Connecticut	L 71–72	22–4	Maravich Assembly Center (8,424); Baton Rouge, LA
Feb 15, 2007	No. 7	at Arkansas	W 86–65	23–4 (9–2)	Bud Walton Arena (2,043); Fayetteville, AR
Feb 19, 2007	No. 7	No. 2 Tennessee	L 51–56	23–5 (9–3)	Maravich Assembly Center (9,146); Baton Rouge, LA
Feb 22, 2007	No. 7	at No. 12 Vanderbilt	L 58–68	23–6 (9–4)	Memorial Gymnasium (5,697); Nashville, TN
Feb 25, 2007*	No. 7	vs. Alabama	W 70–27	24–6 (10–4)	Maravich Assembly Center (5,391); Baton Rouge, LA
SEC Women's Tournament
Mar 2, 2007*	(4) No. 10	vs. (5) Ole Miss; Quarterfinals	W 52–46	25–6	Arena at Gwinnett Center (5,843); Duluth, GA
Mar 3, 2007*	(4) No. 10	vs. (1) No. 2 Tennessee; Semifinals	W 63–54	26–6	Arena at Gwinnett Center (10,142); Duluth, GA
Mar 4, 2007*	(4) No. 10	vs. (3) No. 9 Vanderbilt; Championship game	L 45–51	26–7	Arena at Gwinnett Center (4,759); Duluth, GA
NCAA Tournament
Mar 18, 2007*	(3 FRS) No. 12	vs. (14 FRS) UNC Asheville; First round	W 77–39	27–7	Frank Erwin Center (3,554); Austin, TX
Mar 20, 2007*	(3 FRS) No. 12	vs. (11 FRS) West Virginia; Second round	W 49–43	28–7	Frank Erwin Center (4,196); Austin, TX
Mar 24, 2007*	(3 FRS) No. 12	vs. (10 FRS) Florida State; Regional Semifinal – Sweet Sixteen	W 55–43	29–7	Save Mart Center (3,658); Fresno, CA
Mar 26, 2007*	(3 FRS) No. 12	vs. (1 FRS) No. 4 Connecticut; Regional Final – Elite Eight	W 73–50	30–7	Save Mart Center (3,046); Fresno, CA
Apr 1, 2007*	(3 FRS) No. 12	vs. (4 GBO) No. 15 Rutgers; National Semifinal – Final Four	L 35–59	30–8	Quicken Loans Arena (20,704); Cleveland, OH
*Non-conference game. ^{#}Rankings from AP Poll. (#) Tournament seedings in parentheses. FRS=Fresno Region. All times are in Central Time.

== Rankings ==
2006–07 NCAA Division I women's basketball rankings
