= Erica White =

American basketball player (born 1986)

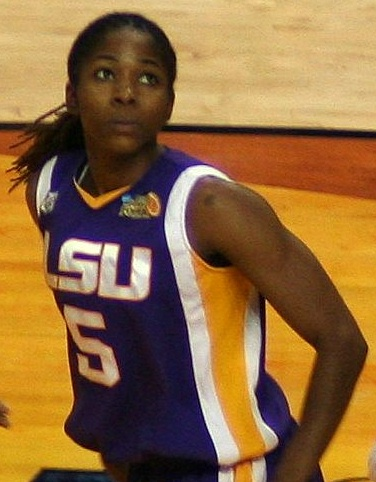

Personal information
- Born: August 26, 1986 (age 40) Jacksonville, Florida, U.S.
- Listed height: 5 ft 4 in (1.63 m)
- Listed weight: 135 lb (61 kg)

Career information
- High school: Ribault (Jacksonville, Florida)
- College: LSU (2004–2008)
- WNBA draft: 2008: 2nd round, 17th overall pick
- Drafted by: Houston Comets
- Position: Guard

Career history
- 2008: Houston Comets
- 2009: Indiana Fever

Career highlights
- McDonald's All-American (2004)
- Stats at Basketball Reference

Erica White (born August 26, 1986) is an American professional women's basketball player.

== Personal ==
Erica Renee' White was born in Jacksonville, Florida. She is the daughter of Terry White and Robin Manigault. White has three sisters, Leslie Manigault, Courtney Manigault, and Jordan White, and a brother, Terry White Jr.

== High school ==
Erica White attended Ribault Senior High School. Her best season statistically was her senior year when she averaged 24.0 points, 6.0 steals and 5.2 assists per game for Hall of Fame coach Alfred Austin. Alongside another area stand out in Dorian Shante Williams, White Led her school to three straight state titles in 2001, 2002 and 2003. Between 2001 and 2003 White and her teammates went on a 109-game winning streak in the state of Florida. White was named the MVP of the State Championship game as a Junior. White participated in two all-American games as a senior. She was named a McDonald's All-American, as well as an Adidas All-American. White was named the MVP of the Adidas High School All-American game in 2004.

== College ==
White went on to play collegiately for the Lady Tigers of Louisiana State University. White was heavily recruited by Legendary Coach Sue Gunter, but due to Gunter's declining health at the time, White never played for her. White was coached by 3 different head coaches during her collegiate career. Pokey Chatman, Bob Starkey, and Van Chancellor. As a sophomore at LSU White played in 34 games and started the final 20 of the season. She started for the first time in her career on January 19 against Alabama and had 10 points, six assists and four steals. As a junior, she played in 37 games with 36 starts. She poured in a career high 20 points against Baylor. Some of her LSU teammates, Sylvia Fowles and Quianna Chaney also entered WNBA draft. White along with Fowles and Chaney led the Lady Tigers to NCAA Final Four appearances all four years at LSU, although they never won a championship.

== Career statistics ==
=== WNBA career statistics ===
Legend
GP	Games played	GS	Games started	MPG	Minutes per game	RPG	Rebounds per game
APG	Assists per game	SPG	Steals per game	BPG	Blocks per game	PPG	Points per game
TO	Turnovers per game	FG%	Field-goal percentage	3P%	3-point field-goal percentage	FT%	Free-throw percentage
**Bold**	Career best	°	League leader

==== Regular season ====
Year	Team	GP	GS	MPG	FG%	3P%	FT%	RPG	APG	SPG	BPG	TO	PPG
2008	Houston	**34**	**2**	**12.5**	**28.4**	**14.3**	**89.7**	**1.4**	1.4	**0.7**	0.1	1.4	**3.6**
2009	Indiana	2	0	9.0	16.7	0.0	0.0	1.0	**2.0**	0.5	**0.5**	**0.0**	1.0
Career	2 years, 2 teams	36	2	12.3	27.7	10.0	89.7	1.4	1.4	0.7	0.1	1.4	3.4

=== College career statistics ===
Legend
GP	Games played	GS	Games started	MPG	Minutes per game
FG%	Field goal percentage	3P%	3-point field goal percentage	FT%	Free throw percentage
RPG	Rebounds per game	APG	Assists per game	SPG	Steals per game
BPG	Blocks per game	PPG	Points per game	**Bold**	Career high

Year	Team	GP	Points	FG%	3P%	FT%	RPG	APG	SPG	BPG	PPG
2004–05	LSU	21	32	36.8	-	33.3	0.8	1.0	0.4	0.1	1.5
2005–06	LSU	34	190	41.8	20.0	**79.8**	2.6	5.4	1.3	0.1	5.6
2006–07	LSU	**37**	**302**	40.2	30.6	73.0	**3.5**	4.3	1.9	**0.2**	**8.2**
2007–08	LSU	36	278	**46.6**	**34.3**	76.3	3.2	4.3	1.9	0.1	7.7
Career	LSU	128	802	42.3	31.2	74.5	2.7	4.1	1.5	0.1	6.3

== Professional career ==
=== WNBA ===
White was drafted with the 17th overall pick in the 2008 WNBA draft by the Houston Comets. She played all 34 games for the Comets that season and started two. That would be the final season for the Comets as they folded at the conclusion of the season. She was then picked up by the Indiana Fever in the 2009 dispersal draft. Three games into the season her teammate, Yolanda Griffith, suffered a career-ending injury, so White was waived by Indiana to make room for Jessica Moore and Shay Murphy.

=== Israeli Women’s Basketball League ===
During the 2008–09 WNBA off-season, White played in the IWBL for Barak Netanya B.C., helping them to their first-ever Liga Leumit championship.

In 2010 as a member of Hapoael Tel Aviv, she led the Israeli league in assists with 8.5 per game. She signed with Ramat Hasharon for 2011, and retired to become a coach at the conclusion of the season.
