= Heather Zurich =

American former basketball coach and professional basketball player

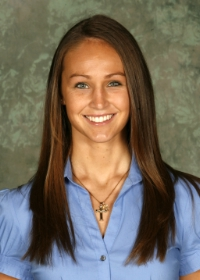
- Heather Zurich in 2010

Personal information
- Born: October 23, 1987 (age 39)

Career information
- High school: Pascack Valley (Hillsdale, New Jersey)
- College: Rutgers (2005–2009)
- Playing career: 2009–2010
- Coaching career: 2010–2017

Career history

Playing
- 2009–2010: Leidsche Rijn

Coaching
- 2010–2011: Wagner (assistant)
- 2011–2015: UC Santa Barbara (assistant)
- 2015–2017: LIU Brooklyn (assistant)

Career highlights
- Dutch League All-Star (2010)

Heather N. Zurich (born October 23, 1987) is an American former basketball player and coach. She played college basketball for Rutgers University from 2005 to 2009 before playing professionally for one season in the Netherlands. Following her playing career, she became a college basketball coach.

== Early life and education ==
Heather Zurich is the daughter of George and Lorrie Zurich of Montvale, N.J. and is the oldest of three children. She has a sister, Monica and a brother, Stephen. Zurich started playing basketball through Heather Miles-Pascack Valley Basketball and coach Jeff Jasper. Before deciding to focus solely on hoops as she got older, Zurich also played soccer and softball.

In spring 2009, Zurich graduated from Rutgers University with a degree in Sport Management and Exercise Science. Zurich completed two semesters towards her Master's of Business Administration during her time as a graduate assistant coach at Wagner College.

== High school career ==
A native of Montvale, New Jersey, Zurich attended Pascack Valley High School located in northern Bergen County. As a senior, Zurich earned a spot on the Star-Ledger, The Record and Associated Press All-State First Teams. She finished her high school career with 1,798 career points and led Pascack Valley to a four-year record of 106–9 and four league titles. In her senior year in 2005, she led Pascack Valley to a 29–2 mark, winning the Group 2 state title and advancing to the semifinals of the Tournament of Champions.

== Collegiate career ==
Heather Zurich helped lead the Scarlet Knights to 102 victories over four seasons. Rutgers reached the NCAA Sweet 16 all four years of Zurich's tenure, making a National Championship appearance in 2007. In the 2009 playoffs, Rutgers coach C. Vivian Stringer cited Zurich as the "'X' factor" in defeating number 2-ranked Auburn and advancing to the regional semifinals.

== Professional career ==
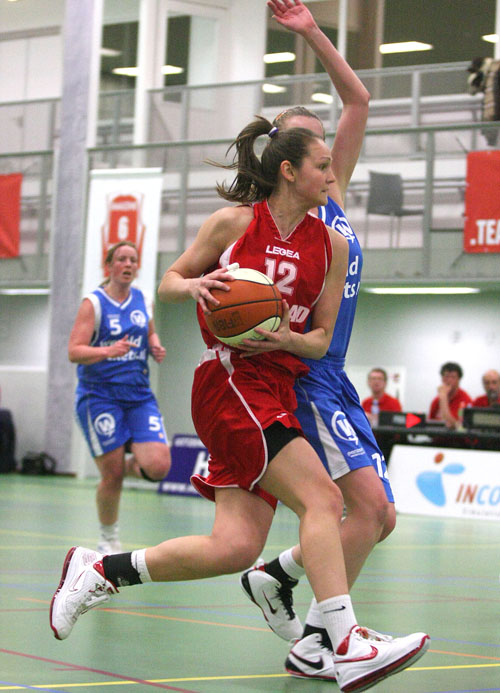
Heather Zurich

In 2009 at the conclusion of her collegiate career, Heather Zurich signed a professional contract with Autocad Amazone Leidsche Rijn of the Dames Eredivisie in The Netherlands.

During the regular season, Zurich was second on the team in scoring (12.2 ppg), rebounding (9.9 rpg), steals (85) and blocked shots (18), propelling the AutoCAD Amazone Leidsche Rijn team to a 16–13 record and a fourth-place finish in the Dames Eredivisie with a 15–11 divisional record.

In the post-season, Zurich helped lead the team to a 2–3 post-season record and a position in the semi-finals where the team lost to the ProBuild Lions. She finished first in scoring (72) and second in rebounding (37) while recording 2 games with double-digit scoring and rebounding.

== Coaching career ==
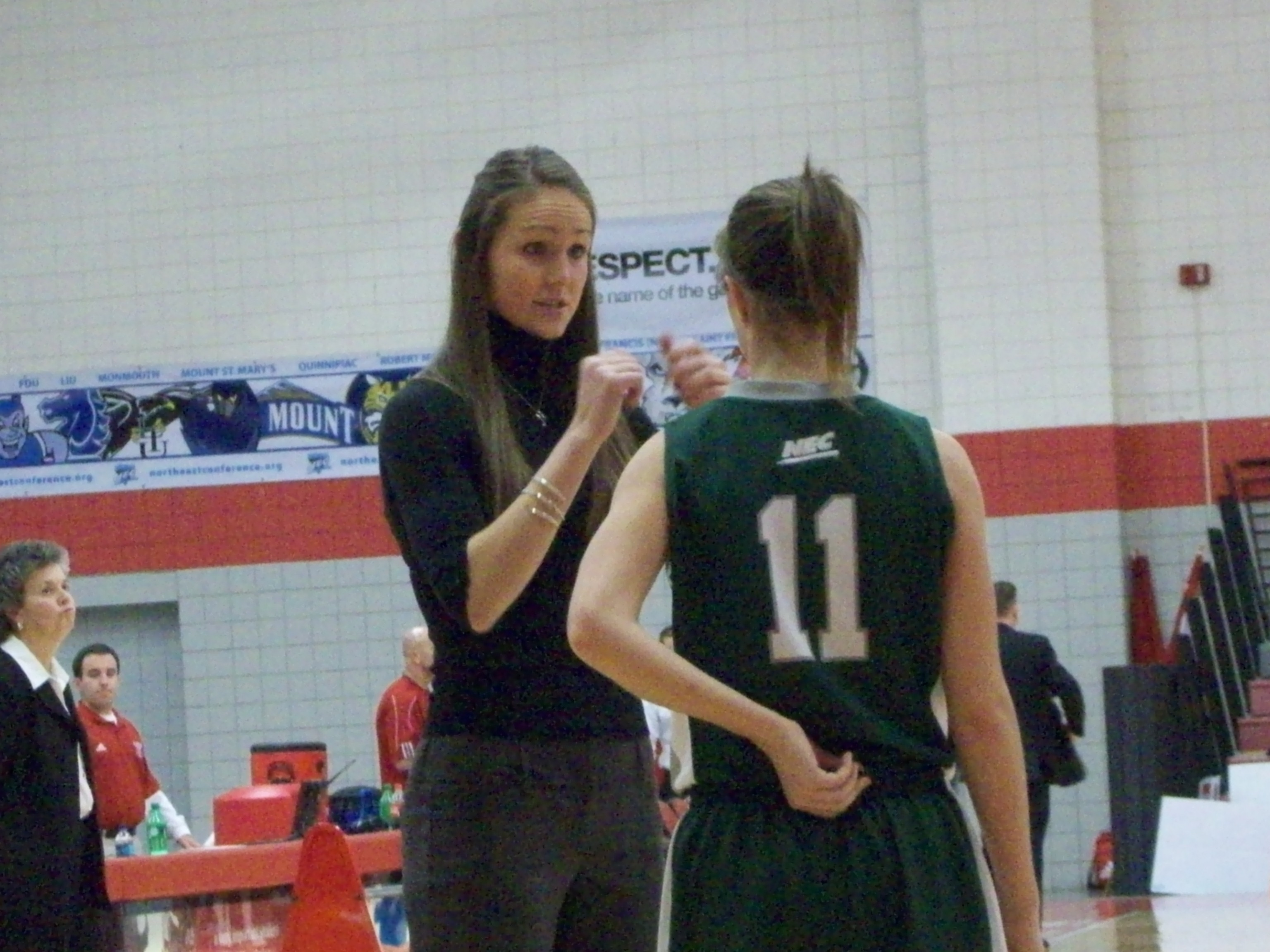
Heather Zurich

=== Wagner ===
Zurich's first coaching assignment was as a graduate assistant coach at Wagner on Staten Island, New York. She worked primarily with assistant coach Brett Self on individual post player development and assisted on perimeter instruction. Zurich assisted Coach Mikalauskas in leading the Wagner Seahawks in the 2010–11 season to a 12–17 overall record and 5–13 record in the Northeast Conference.

=== UC Santa Barbara ===
In May 2011, Zurich hired on as a full-time assistant coach at UC Santa Barbara in California.

Zurich assisted Coach Mitchell in leading the UC Santa Barbara Gauchos in the 2011–12 season to a 17–16 overall record (8–8 in Big West Conference play) with a 6th-place finish in conference play and a Big West Conference Tournament Championship. The Gauchos earned an automatic bid to the post-season NCAA Tournament where they lost in the first round to the eventual national champion, Baylor University.

In her second season at UC Santa Barbara, Zurich assisted Coach Mitchell in leading the Gauchos in the 2012–13 season to a 16–17 overall record (11–7 in Big West Conference play) with a fourth-place finish in conference play. The Gauchos earned an invitation to the WNIT post-season tournament where they lost in the first round to San Diego State University.

Zurich's third season assisting at UC Santa Barbara was a tough one for the Gauchos, falling to an 8–22 overall record (3–14 in Big West Conference play) with an 8th-place finish in conference play.

In her fourth and final season assisting at UC Santa Barbara, the Gauchos had a difficult and disappointing season with a 2–27 overall record (2–14 in Big West Conference play) with a 9th-place finish in conference play.

=== LIU Brooklyn ===
In June 2015, Zurich joined the staff of Stephanie Oliver as an assistant coach and recruiting coordinator for LIU Brooklyn in New York.

Zurich assisted Coach Oliver in leading the Long Island University-Brooklyn Blackbirds in the 2015–16 season to a 9–21 overall record (7–11 in Northeast Conference play) with a 7th-place finish in conference play.

In her second season and last season assisting at Long Island University-Brooklyn, the Blackbirds had a 6–23 overall record (5–13 in Northeast Conference play) with a 9th-place finish in conference play. Following the season, Zurich left the ranks of coaching and pursued a professional career in the private sector.

== Statistics ==
=== College ===
Year	Team	GP	GS	MPG	FG%	3P%	FT%	RPG	APG	SPG	BPG	TO	PPG
2005–06	Rutgers	21	-	4.0	38.1	37.5	0.0	0.4	0.2	0.0	0.0	0.3	0.9
2006–07	Rutgers	36	-	24.9	42.2	37.0	75.0	2.1	1.2	0.5	0.3	1.1	4.9
2007–08	Rutgers	33	-	24.8	42.1	28.6	66.7	2.7	1.0	0.4	0.1	1.3	4.6
2008–09	Rutgers	33	-	26.9	42.8	31.1	87.1	2.5	1.6	0.7	0.2	1.1	5.5
Career		123	-	21.8	42.2	32.6	76.2	2.1	1.1	0.4	0.2	1.0	4.3
Statistics retrieved from Sports-Reference.

=== Professional statistics ===
Career statistics
Season	G	Min	MPG	FGM	FGA	FG%	3FGM	3FGA	3FG%	FTM	FTA	FT%	Pts	PPG	OR	DR	Reb	RPG	A	TO	Blk	Stl	PF	FO	Eff
2009–10	33	1135	34.4	145	330	43.9%	11	29	37.9%	90	113	79.6%	413	12.5	78	235	313	9.5	75	78	18	93	110	2	18.4
Totals	33	1135	34.4	145	330	43.9%	11	29	37.9%	90	113	79.6%	413	12.5	78	235	313	9.5	75	78	18	93	110	2	18.4

=== Legend ===
3FG%	3-pt field goal percentage	3FGA	3-pt field goals attempted	3FGM	3-pt field goals made	A	Assists
Blk	Blocks	DR	Defensive rebounds	Eff	Efficiency rating	FG%	Field goal percentage
FGA	Field goals attempted	FGM	Field goals made	FO	Fouled out	FPG	Fouls per game
FT%	Free throw percentage	FTA	Free throws attempted	FTM	Free throws made	G	Games
Min	Minutes	MPG	Minutes per game	OR	Offensive rebounds	PF	Personal fouls
PPG	Points per game	Pts	Points	Reb	Rebounds	RPG	Rebounds per game
S	Starts	Stl	Steals	TO	Turnovers
