= 2006–07 Rutgers Scarlet Knights women's basketball team =

Intercollegiate basketball season

2006–07 Rutgers Scarlet Knights women's basketball

Big East tournament champions

NCAA tournament, Runner-up
- Conference: Big East Conference

Ranking
- Coaches: No. 2
- AP: No. 15
- Record: 27–9 (12–4 Big East)
- Head coach: C. Vivian Stringer (12th season)
- Assistant coaches: Jolette Law; Carlene Mitchell; Marianne Stanley
- Home arena: Louis Brown Athletic Center

2006–07 Big East Conference women's basketball standings
	Conf.				Overall
Team	W		L	PCT	W		L	PCT
No. 4 Connecticut	16	–	0	1.000	32	–	4	.889
No. 22 Marquette	12	–	4	.750	26	–	7	.788
No. 15 Rutgers †	12	–	4	.750	27	–	9	.750
West Virginia	11	–	5	.688	21	–	11	.656
No. 25 Louisville	10	–	6	.625	27	–	8	.771
Pittsburgh	10	–	6	.625	24	–	9	.727
Notre Dame	10	–	6	.625	20	–	12	.625
South Florida	9	–	7	.563	21	–	12	.636
Seton Hall	9	–	7	.563	19	–	12	.613
DePaul	8	–	8	.500	19	–	13	.594
Cincinnati	6	–	10	.375	15	–	14	.517
St. John's	4	–	12	.250	8	–	20	.286
Georgetown	3	–	13	.188	13	–	16	.448
Providence	3	–	13	.188	13	–	16	.448
Syracuse	3	–	13	.188	9	–	20	.310
Villanova	2	–	14	.125	8	–	21	.276
† 2007 Big East Tournament winner Rankings from AP poll

The 2006–07 Rutgers Scarlet Knights women's basketball team represented Rutgers University during the 2006–07 NCAA Division I women's basketball season. The Scarlet Knights, led by 12th year head coach C. Vivian Stringer, played their home games at the Louis Brown Athletic Center, better known as The RAC, as a member of the Big East Conference.

They finished the season 27–9, 12–4 in Big East play to finish tied for second place. They advanced to the championship game of the Big East women's tournament where they defeated No. 2 UConn to capture the tournament title. They received an automatic bid to the NCAA women's basketball tournament as No. 4 seed in the Greensboro region, and they would reach the second Final Four in program history. Rutgers won their National semifinal game over LSU, but fell in the National championship game to No. 3 Tennessee.

== Roster ==
2006–07 Rutgers Scarlet Knights women's basketball team
Players
Coaches

Pos.	#	Name	Height	Year	Previous school	Hometown
F	5	Essence Carson	6 ft 0 in (1.83 m)	Jr	Eastside	Paterson, NJ
G	10	Epiphanny Prince	5 ft 9 in (1.75 m)	Fr	Murry Bergtraum	New York, NY
C	15	Kia Vaughn	6 ft 4 in (1.93 m)	So	St. Michael Academy	Bronx, NY
G/F	21	Heather Zurich	6 ft 1 in (1.85 m)	So	Pascack Valley	Hillsdale, NJ
G	22	Matee Ajavon	5 ft 8 in (1.73 m)	Jr	Malcolm X Shabazz	Newark, NJ

Head coach

- C. Vivian Stringer (Slippery Rock)

Assistant coach(es)

Legend

- (C) Team captain
- (S) Suspended
- (I) Ineligible
- (W) Walk-on
- Injured
- Current redshirt

Roster

== Schedule ==
Date time, TV	Rank^{#}	Opponent^{#}	Result	Record	Site (attendance) city, state
Regular season
Big East Tournament
Mar 4, 2007*	(2) No. 18	vs. (10) DePaul; Quarterfinals	W 63–55	20–8	Hartford Civic Center; Hartford, CT
Mar 5, 2007*	(2) No. 19	vs. (3) No. 21 Marquette; Semifinals	W 63–55	21–8	Hartford Civic Center; Hartford, CT
Mar 6, 2007*	(2) No. 18	at (1) No. 2 Connecticut; Championship game	W 55–47	22–8	Hartford Civic Center; Hartford, CT
NCAA Tournament
Mar 18, 2007*	(4 GBO) No. 15	vs. (13 GBO) East Carolina; First round	W 77–34	23–8	Breslin Student Events Center; East Lansing, Michigan
Mar 20, 2007*	(4 GBO) No. 15	at (5 GBO) No. 23 Michigan State; Second round	W 70–57	24–8	Breslin Student Events Center; East Lansing, Michigan
Mar 24, 2007*	(4 GBO) No. 15	vs. (1 GBO) No. 1 Duke; Regional Semifinal – Sweet Sixteen	W 53–52	25–8	Greensboro Coliseum; Greensboro, NC
Mar 26, 2007*	(4 GBO) No. 15	vs. (3 GBO) No. 10 Arizona State; Regional Final – Elite Eight	W 64–45	26–8	Greensboro Coliseum; Greensboro, NC
Apr 1, 2007*	(4 GBO) No. 15	vs. (3 FRS) No. 12 LSU; National Semifinal – Final Four	W 59–35	27–8	Quicken Loans Arena; Cleveland, OH
Apr 3, 2007*	(4 GBO) No. 15	vs. (1 DAY) No. 3 Tennessee; National Championship	L 46–59	27–9	Quicken Loans Arena; Cleveland, OH
*Non-conference game. ^{#}Rankings from AP Poll. (#) Tournament seedings in parentheses. All times are in Eastern Time.

== See also ==
2006–07 Rutgers Scarlet Knights men's basketball team
