= 2006–07 Tennessee Lady Volunteers basketball team =

Intercollegiate basketball season

2006–07 Tennessee Lady Volunteers basketball

NCAA tournament National Champions
- Conference: Southeastern Conference

Ranking
- Coaches: No. 4
- AP: No. 3
- Record: 34–3 (14–0 SEC)
- Head coach: Pat Summitt
- Assistant coaches: Nikki Fargas; Holly Warlick
- Home arena: Thompson-Boling Arena

2006–07 SEC women's basketball standings
	Conf.				Overall
Team	W		L	PCT	W		L	PCT
No. 3 Tennessee	14	–	0	1.000	34	–	3	.919
No. 13 Georgia	11	–	3	.786	27	–	7	.794
No. 7 Vanderbilt^{†}	10	–	4	.714	28	–	6	.824
No. 12 LSU	10	–	4	.714	30	–	8	.789
Ole Miss	9	–	5	.643	24	–	11	.686
Mississippi State	7	–	7	.500	18	–	14	.563
Kentucky	6	–	8	.429	20	–	14	.588
South Carolina	6	–	8	.429	18	–	15	.545
Auburn	6	–	8	.429	21	–	13	.618
Arkansas	3	–	11	.214	18	–	13	.581
Florida	2	–	12	.143	9	–	22	.290
Alabama	0	–	14	.000	10	–	20	.333
† 2007 SEC tournament winner Rankings from AP poll

The 2006–07 Tennessee Lady Volunteers basketball team represented the University of Tennessee. The head coach was Pat Summitt. The team played its home games in the Thompson-Boling Arena and was a member of the Southeastern Conference. The Lady Vols won their seventh national championship

== Roster ==
2006–07 Tennessee Lady Volunteers women's basketball team
Players
Coaches

Pos.	#	Name	Height	Year	Previous school	Hometown
G	00	Shannon Bobbitt	5 ft 2 in (1.57 m)	Jr	Murry Bergtraum	Bronx, NY
F	1	Sidney Spencer	6 ft 3 in (1.91 m)	Sr	Hoover	Hoover, AL
G	2	Cait McMahan	5 ft 4 in (1.63 m)	Fr		Maryville, TN
F	3	Candace Parker	6 ft 4 in (1.93 m)	So	Naperville Central	Naperville, IL
G	10	Elizabeth Curry	5 ft 6 in (1.68 m)	Sr		New Virginia, IA
F	13	Dominique Redding	6 ft 1 in (1.85 m)	Sr		Clearwater, FL
G	14	Alexis Hornbuckle	5 ft 11 in (1.8 m)	Jr	South Charleston	Charleston, WV
G/F	33	Alberta Auguste	5 ft 11 in (1.8 m)	Jr		Marrero, LA
F	34	Nicci Moats	6 ft 2 in (1.88 m)	Fr		Daleville, VA
F/C	44	Alex Fuller	6 ft 3 in (1.91 m)	So	Shelbyville Central	Shelbyville, TN
F/C	55	Nicky Anosike	6 ft 4 in (1.93 m)	Jr	St. Peter's	Brooklyn, NY

Head coach

- Pat Summitt

Assistant coach(es)

- Nikki Fargas
- Holly Warlick

Legend

- (C) Team captain
- (S) Suspended
- (I) Ineligible
- (W) Walk-on
- Injured
- Current redshirt

Roster

== Schedule ==
Date time, TV	Rank^{#}	Opponent^{#}	Result	Record	Site (attendance) city, state
Exhibition
Nov 1, 2006*		Carson–Newman	W 104–49		Thompson–Boling Arena; Knoxville, TN
Nov 5, 2006*		Houston Jaguars	W 101–51		Thompson–Boling Arena; Knoxville, TN
Non-conference regular season
Nov 12, 2006*	No. 5	Chattanooga	W 102–72	1–0	Thompson–Boling Arena (12,022); Knoxville, TN
Nov 16, 2006*	No. 5	No. 20 UCLA	W 83–60	2–0	Thompson–Boling Arena (11,882); Knoxville, TN
Nov 19, 2006*	No. 5	at No. 11 Arizona State	W 83–74	3–0	Wells Fargo Arena (8,918); Tempe, AZ
Nov 24, 2006*	No. 4	No. 11 Stanford	W 77–60	4–0	Thompson–Boling Arena (15,491); Knoxville, TN
Nov 26, 2006*	No. 4	Middle Tennessee	W 88–64	5–0	Thompson–Boling Arena (12,363); Knoxville, TN
Nov 28, 2006*	No. 4	at Louisiana Tech	W 71–50	6–0	Thomas Assembly Center (6,348); Ruston, LA
Dec 3, 2006*; ESPN	No. 4	at No. 2 North Carolina	L 57–70	6–1	Carmichael Auditorium (8,010); Chapel Hill, NC
Dec 5, 2006*	No. 6	Tennessee–Martin	W 85–29	7–1	Thompson–Boling Arena (11,167); Knoxville, TN
Dec 7, 2006*	No. 6	No. 21 George Washington	W 85–62	8–1	Thompson–Boling Arena (10,944); Knoxville, TN
Dec 17, 2006*	No. 5	at No. 23 Texas	W 67–46	9–1	Frank Erwin Center (7,522); Austin, TX
Dec 20, 2006*	No. 5	West Virginia	W 66–51	10–1	Thompson–Boling Arena (12,411); Knoxville, TN
Dec 22, 2006*	No. 5	at Old Dominion	W 75–59	11–1	Chartway Arena (7,108); Norfolk, VA
Dec 30, 2006*	No. 4	Notre Dame	W 78–54	12–1	Thompson–Boling Arena (19,092); Knoxville, TN
SEC regular season
Jan 3, 2007	No. 4	Alabama	W 72–36	13–1 (1–0)	Thompson–Boling Arena (11,966); Knoxville, TN
Jan 6, 2007*	No. 4	at No. 5 Connecticut	W 70–64	14–1	XL Center (16,294); Hartford, CT
Jan 11, 2007	No. 4	at Florida	W 80–58	15–1 (2–0)	Stephen C. O'Connell Center (2,203); Gainesville, FL
Jan 14, 2007	No. 4	at No. 15 Georgia	W 52–41	16–1 (3–0)	Stegeman Coliseum (10,523); Athens, GA
Jan 18, 2007	No. 4	at Mississippi State	W 73–44	17–1 (4–0)	Thompson–Boling Arena (14,881); Knoxville, TN
Jan 22, 2007*	No. 4	No. 1 Duke	L 70–74	17–2	Thompson–Boling Arena (21,118); Knoxville, TN
Jan 25, 2007	No. 4	at No. 15 Vanderbilt	W 67–57	18–2 (5–0)	Memorial Gymnasium (12,009); Nashville, TN
Jan 28, 2007	No. 4	at Alabama	W 80–51	19–2 (6–0)	Coleman Coliseum (4,601); Tuscaloosa, AL
Feb 1, 2007	No. 3	South Carolina	W 72–36	20–2 (7–0)	Thompson–Boling Arena (11,989); Knoxville, TN
Feb 5, 2007	No. 3	No. 9 Georgia	W 73–57	21–2 (8–0)	Thompson–Boling Arena (13,475); Knoxville, TN
Feb 8, 2007	No. 3	at Auburn	W 72–62	22–2 (9–0)	Beard–Eaves–Memorial Coliseum (4,128); Auburn, AL
Feb 11, 2007	No. 3	Kentucky	W 84–62	23–2 (10–0)	Thompson–Boling Arena (18,952); Knoxville, TN
Feb 15, 2007	No. 3	Ole Miss	W 81–69	24–2 (11–0)	Thompson–Boling Arena (12,841); Knoxville, TN
Feb 19, 2007	No. 2	at No. 7 LSU	W 56–51	25–2 (12–0)	Maravich Assembly Center (9,146); Baton Rouge, LA
Feb 22, 2007	No. 2	at Arkansas	W 75–68 ^{OT}	26–2 (13–0)	Bud Walton Arena (3,738); Fayetteville, AR
Feb 25, 2007	No. 2	No. 12 Vanderbilt	W 73–53	27–2 (14–0)	Thompson–Boling Arena (24,251); Knoxville, TN
SEC tournament
Mar 2, 2007*	(1) No. 2	vs. (8) South Carolina; Second round	W 81–63	28–2	Arena at Gwinnett Center (6,628); Duluth, GA
Mar 3, 2007*	(1) No. 2	vs. (4) No. 10 LSU; Semifinals	L 54–63	28–3	Arena at Gwinnett Center (10,142); Duluth, GA
NCAA Women's Tournament
Mar 18, 2007	(1 DAY) No. 3	vs. (16 DAY) Drake; First round	W 76–37	29–3	Petersen Events Center (6,601); Pittsburgh, PA
Mar 20, 2007	(1 DAY) No. 3	at (8 DAY) Pittsburgh; Second round	W 68–54	30–3	Petersen Events Center (8,791); Pittsburgh, PA
Mar 25, 2007; 12:00 p.m.	(1 DAY) No. 3	vs. (13 DAY) Marist; Regional Semifinal – Sweet Sixteen	W 65–46	31–3	UD Arena (9,023); Dayton, OH
Mar 27, 2007	(1 DAY) No. 3	vs. (7 DAY) Ole Miss; Regional Final – Elite Eight	W 98–62	32–3	UD Arena (8,205); Dayton, OH
Apr 1, 2007; ESPN	(1 DAY) No. 3	vs. (1 DAL) No. 2 North Carolina; National Semifinal – Final Four	W 56–50	33–3	Quicken Loans Arena (20,704); Cleveland, OH
Apr 3, 2007	(1 DAY) No. 3	vs. (4 GRE) No. 15 Rutgers; National Championship	W 59–46	34–3	Quicken Loans Arena (20,704); Cleveland, OH
*Non-conference game. ^{#}Rankings from AP Poll. (#) Tournament seedings in parentheses. DAY=Dayton. All times are in Eastern Time.

== SEC Women’s Basketball tournament ==
- Tennessee (1) 81, South Carolina (8) 63
- LSU (4) 63, Tennessee 54

== NCAA basketball tournament ==
Seeding in brackets

- Dayton Regional
  - Tennessee (1) 76, Drake (16) 37
  - Tennessee 68, Pittsburgh (8) 54
  - Tennessee 65, Marist (13) 46
  - Tennessee 98, Mississippi (7) 62
- Final Four
  - Tennessee 56, North Carolina 50
  - Tennessee 59, Rutgers 46

== Awards and honors ==
- Alexis Hornbuckle, SEC All-Tournament Team
- Candace Parker, Tournament Most Outstanding Player
- Candace Parker, USBWA Player of the Year
- Candace Parker, Wooden Award

== Team players drafted into the WNBA ==
Round	Pick	Player	NBA club
2	25	Sidney Spencer	Los Angeles Sparks

== See also ==
- Tennessee Lady Volunteers basketball
- Pat Summitt
- 2007 NCAA Division I women's basketball tournament
- 2007 SEC women's basketball tournament
