= Bob Starkey =

American basketball coach (born 1959)

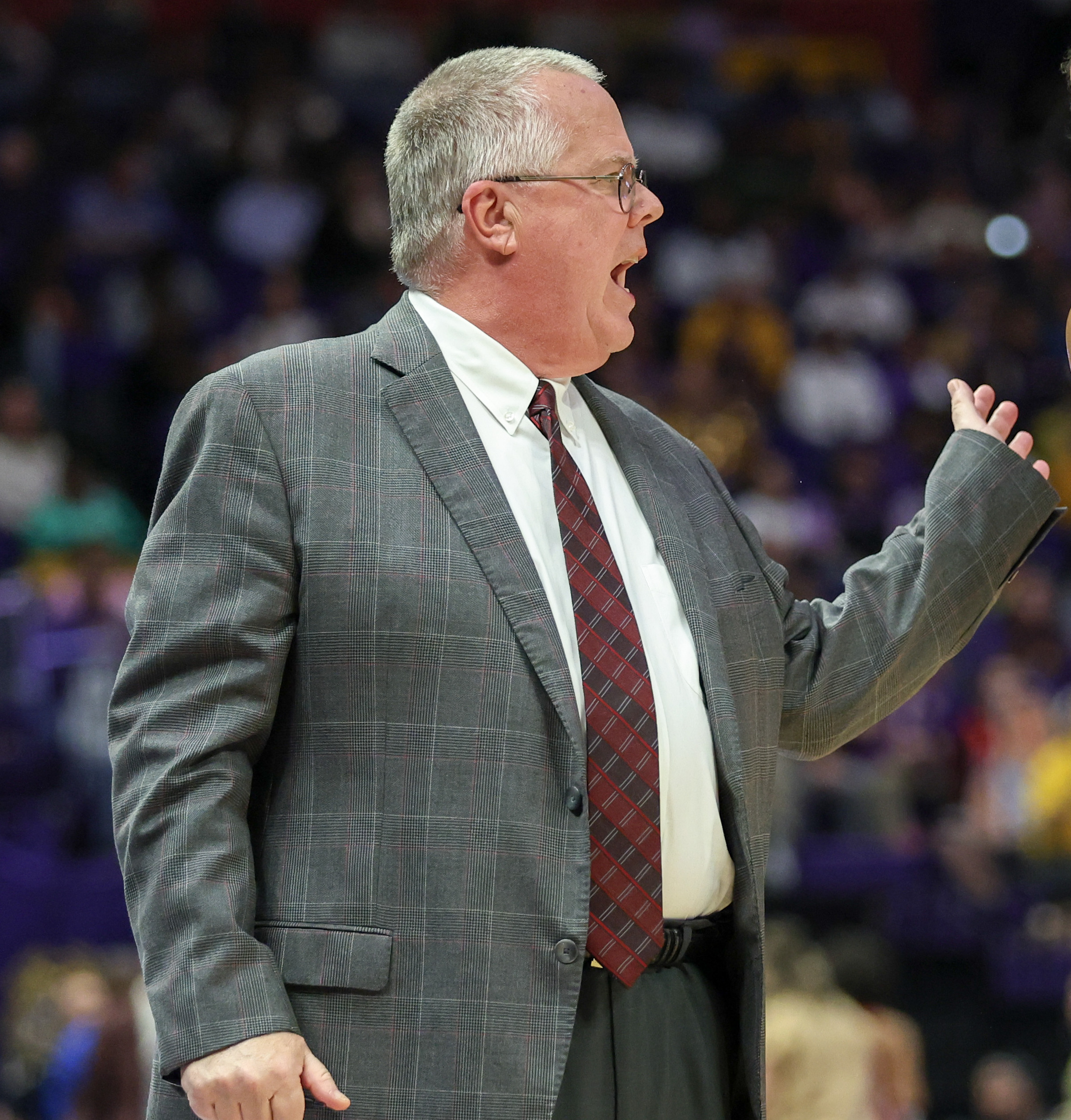
- Starkey in 2024

Current position
- Title: Associate Head Coach
- Team: LSU
- Conference: SEC

Biographical details
- Born: September 7, 1959 (age 67); Charleston, West Virginia, U.S.

Coaching career (HC unless noted)
- 1984–1987: West Virginia State (Men's Assistant)
- 1988–89: Marshall (Assistant)
- 1990–1996: LSU (Men's Assistant)
- 1998–2007: LSU (Assistant)
- 2007: LSU (Interim HC)
- 2007–2011: LSU (Associate HC)
- 2011–2012: UCF (Assistant)
- 2012–2021: Texas A&M (Assistant)
- 2021–2022: Auburn (Assistant)
- 2022–present: LSU (Associate HC)

Head coaching record
- Overall: 4–1

Bob Starkey (born September 7, 1959) is an assistant coach for the LSU Tigers women's basketball team. He served as an assistant under head coach Gary Blair at Texas A&M from 2012 to 2021.

== Coaching career ==
Starkey began his career as an assistant coach for the men's basketball team at West Virginia State University from 1984 to 1987. He then became an assistant coach at Marshall University for the women's team from 1988 to 1989. In 1990, Starkey moved to Louisiana State University as an assistant for the LSU men's team until 1996. In 1997, he was an administrative assistant for the LSU men's and women's basketball teams. Starting in 1998, he served as an assistant coach for the LSU Lady Tigers basketball team until 2011. During the 2007 season, he served as interim head coach during the 2007 NCAA Division I women's basketball tournament after Pokey Chatman resigned on March 7, 2007 and then stepped down immediately on March 8, 2007. During his time as interim head coach, Starkey led the Lady Tigers to its fourth straight Final Four, coaching the team to a 4–1 record. Starkey stated that he had no desire to become LSU's head coach on a permanent basis and instead remained at LSU as an assistant coach under Van Chancellor. During the 2011–2012 season, Starkey was an assistant for UCF women's team.
