= 2007 NCAA Division I women's basketball tournament =

American college basketball tournament

- The birthplace of Rock and Roll was honored with a guitar on the 2007 Women's Final Four logo.
- Teams: 64
- Finals site: Quicken Loans Arena, Cleveland, Ohio
- Champions: Tennessee Lady Volunteers (7th title, 12th title game, 17th Final Four)
- Runner-up: Rutgers Scarlet Knights (1st title game, 2nd Final Four)
- Semifinalists: North Carolina Tar Heels (3rd Final Four); LSU Tigers (4th Final Four)
- Winning coach: Pat Summitt (7th title)
- MOP: Candace Parker (Tennessee)

The 2007 NCAA Division I women's basketball tournament began on March 17, 2007, and concluded on April 3 at Quicken Loans Arena in Cleveland, Ohio. The Final Four consisted of Tennessee, LSU, Rutgers, and North Carolina, with Tennessee defeating Rutgers 59–46 for their seventh National Title. Tennessee's Candace Parker was named the Most Outstanding Player of the tournament.

== Notable events ==
The Dallas Regional largely followed the seeding, with the top two seeds meeting in the regional final, and the top seed, North Carolina, winning 84–72 to move on to the Final Four, the second consecutive trip to the Final Four for the Tarheels. In the Dayton Regional, seventh-seeded Mississippi upset second-seeded Maryland, and followed that with an upset of third-seeded Oklahoma, but in the regional final faced top-seeded Tennessee, who went on to beat Mississippi by 36 points, and move on to the Final Four. This is last time Mississippi upset a top seed a feat not repeated until 2023 when 8 seeded Ole Miss upset number 1 seeded Stanford in the second round but losing to Louisville in the third round.

In the Fresno Regional, the second-seeded Stanford Cardinal fell to Florida State, who then lost to third-seeded LSU. This is last time Stanford got eliminated in the second round until 2023. The wins by Florida State over ODU and Stanford were vacated by the NCAA. In the regional final, LSU easily beat Connecticut, 73–50. This was the last Final Four to not feature Connecticut until 2023. In the Greensboro Regional, neither of the top two seeds made it to the regional final. The top seed, Duke, lost a one-point game to Rutgers, while the second seed, Vanderbilt, was ousted in the second round by Bowling Green. Fourth-seeded Rutgers beat the third seed, Arizona State, by 19 points in the regional final.

The semifinal game between Tennessee and North Carolina was expected to be a high-scoring game, but it turned out to be more disorder than scoring, In a game the New York Times would describe as an "artless grind", the Tarheels held a 48–36 lead with just over eight minutes to play. They would not score another basket. The Lady Vols, who ended up hitting only 27% of the field goal attempts, went on a 20–2 run, and ended up with the win, 56–50.

In the other semifinal, Rutgers faced LSU. Rutgers's appearance in a Final Four game seemed improbable earlier in the season, when the Scarlet Knights lost four of their first six games, and played so poorly that their coach C. Vivian Stringer revoked their access to their locker room. However, their play, particularly their defense, improved, and they were now a game away from a possible appearance in a national championship game, if they could defeat LSU, who had Sylvia Fowles as a dominant center. Fowles, who would go on to be the second overall WNBA draft pick the following year, had just completed a double-double against Connecticut, scoring 23 points, snaring 15 rebounds and blocking 6 shots. Rutgers held her to five points while missing eight of her ten field goal attempts. Rutgers pulled out to a 37–19 lead at halftime, and went on to win, holding LSU to 35 points, an NCAA record low in a Final Four game.

In the championship game, Tennessee was too much for Rutgers. The Lady Vols had an eleven-point lead at halftime, which Rutgers cut to seven, but that was as close as they would get. Candace Parker scored 17 points, but Pat Summitt noted the contribution of their 5-foot 2-inch point guard Shannon Bobbitt, who hit two key three-pointers en route to scoring 13 points of her own. Tennessee won 59–46, bringing the seventh national championship to the school, and increasing the win total of Summitt to 947, which is 33 more than Bob Knight, the most victorious coach on the men's side.

== Subregionals ==
2007 NCAA subregionals

Once again, the system was the same as the Division I men's basketball tournament, with the exception that only 64 teams go and there is no play-in game. Automatic bids are secured by 31 conference champions and 33 at-large bids.

The subregionals, which once again used the "pod system", keeping most teams at or close to the home cities, were held from March 17 to 20 at these locations:

- March 17 and 19:

Frank Erwin Center, Austin, Texas (Host: University of Texas at Austin)
Williams Arena, Minneapolis (Host: University of Minnesota, Twin Cities)
Maples Pavilion, Stanford, California (Host: Stanford University)
Galen Center, Los Angeles (Host: University of Southern California)

- March 18 and 20:

Breslin Student Events Center, East Lansing, Michigan (Host: Michigan State University)
Hartford Civic Center, Hartford, Connecticut (Host: University of Connecticut)
Petersen Events Center, Pittsburgh, Pennsylvania (Host: University of Pittsburgh)
RBC Center, Raleigh, North Carolina (Host: North Carolina State University)

== Regionals ==
2007 NCAA Regionals and Final Four

The regionals were held from March 24 to 27 in the following regions. The regionals, as they were in the previous two tournaments, were named after the city they were played in.

- March 24 and 26:

Fresno Regional, Save Mart Center, Fresno, California (Host: Fresno State University)
Greensboro Regional, Greensboro Coliseum, Greensboro, North Carolina (Host: Atlantic Coast Conference)

- March 25 and 27:

Dallas Regional, Reunion Arena, Dallas, Texas (Hosts: Conference USA and Southern Methodist University)
Dayton Regional, University of Dayton Arena, Dayton, Ohio (Host: University of Dayton)

The regional winners advanced to the Final Four, held on April 1 and 3, 2007, at Quicken Loans Arena, in Cleveland, Ohio, hosted by both Cleveland State University and the Mid-American Conference.

== Tournament records ==
- Three pointers—Matee Ajavon, Rutgers hit four of five three point field goals. The 80% completion ratio is tied for the best in a Final Four game.
- Points—LSU scored 35 points in the semifinal game, the fewest points scored in a Final Four game.
- Three pointers—Nadia Begay, Boise State, hit eight three point field goals in a first-round game against George Washington, tied for the most scored in a first or second-round game.

== Qualifying teams - automatic ==
Sixty-four teams were selected to participate in the 2007 NCAA Tournament. Thirty-one conferences were eligible for an automatic bid to the 2007 NCAA tournament.

Automatic bids
		Record		
Qualifying School	Conference	Regular Season	Conference	Seed
Belmont University	Atlantic Sun Conference	25–6	16–2	14
Boise State University	WAC	24–8	12–4	12
Bowling Green State University	MAC	29–3	15–1	7
University of Tennessee at Chattanooga	Southern Conference	25–7	15–3	12
Delaware State University	MEAC	20–12	12–6	15
Drake University	Missouri Valley Conference	14–18	5–13	16
East Carolina University	Conference USA	19–13	11–5	13
Gonzaga University	West Coast Conference	24–9	13–1	12
University of Wisconsin–Green Bay	Horizon League	28–3	16–0	9
Harvard University	Ivy League	15–12	13–1	15
College of the Holy Cross	Patriot League	15–17	7–7	16
Idaho State University	Big Sky Conference	17–13	11–5	15
Marist College	MAAC	27–5	17–1	13
Middle Tennessee State University	Sun Belt Conference	29–3	18–0	5
University of New Mexico	Mountain West	24–8	11–5	8
University of North Carolina	ACC	30–3	11–3	1
University of Oklahoma	Big 12	26–4	13–3	3
Old Dominion University	Colonial	24–8	17–1	7
Oral Roberts University	Mid-Continent	22–10	8–6	15
Prairie View A&M University	SWAC	19–13	14–4	16
Purdue University	Big Ten	28–5	14–2	2
Robert Morris University	Northeast Conference	24–7	15–3	13
Rutgers University	Big East	22–8	12–4	4
Southeast Missouri State University	Ohio Valley Conference	24–7	16–4	14
Stanford University	Pac-10	28–4	17–1	2
University of Texas at Arlington	Southland	24–8	16–0	13
University of California, Riverside	Big West Conference	21–10	12–2	14
University of Maryland, Baltimore County	America East	16–16	6–10	16
University of North Carolina at Asheville	Big South Conference	21–11	9–5	14
Vanderbilt University	SEC	27–5	10–4	2
Xavier University	Atlantic 10	26–7	11–3	6

== Qualifying teams - at-large ==
Thirty-three additional teams were selected to complete the sixty-four invitations.

At-large Bids
		Record		
Qualifying School	Conference	Regular Season	Conference	Seed
Arizona State University	Pacific-10	28–4	16–2	3
Baylor University	Big 12	25–7	11–5	5
Brigham Young University	Mountain West	23–9	12–4	11
University of California, Berkeley	Pacific-10	23–8	12–6	8
University of Connecticut	Big East	29–3	16–0	1
University of Delaware	Colonial	26–5	16–2	12
DePaul University	Big East	19–12	8–8	10
Duke University	Atlantic Coast	30–1	14–0	1
Florida State University	Atlantic Coast	22–9	10–4	10
The George Washington University	Atlantic 10	26–3	14–0	5
University of Georgia	Southeastern	25–6	11–3	3
Georgia Institute of Technology	Atlantic Coast	20–11	9–5	7
Iowa State University	Big 12	25–8	10–6	6
James Madison University	Colonial	27–5	16–2	9
University of Louisiana at Lafayette	Sun Belt	25–8	14–4	11
University of Louisville	Big East	26–7	10–6	6
Louisiana State University	Southeastern	26–7	10–4	3
Marquette University	Big East	25–6	12–4	6
University of Maryland, College Park	Atlantic Coast	27–5	10–4	2
Michigan State University	Big Ten	23–8	13–3	5
University of Mississippi (Ole Miss)	Southeastern	21–10	9–5	7
University of Nebraska–Lincoln	Big 12	22–9	10–6	9
North Carolina State University	Atlantic Coast	23–9	10–4	4
University of Notre Dame	Big East	19–11	10–6	9
Ohio State University	Big Ten	28–3	15–1	4
Oklahoma State University–Stillwater	Big 12	20–10	8–8	10
University of Pittsburgh	Big East	23–8	10–6	8
Texas Christian University	Mountain West	21–10	11–5	10
Temple University	Atlantic 10	24–7	13–1	8
University of Tennessee	Southeastern	28–3	14–0	1
Texas A&M University	Big 12	24–6	13–3	4
University of Washington	Pacific-10	18–12	11–7	11
West Virginia University	Big East	20–10	11–5	11

== Tournament seeds ==
Dallas RegionalReunion Arena, Dallas, Texas
Seed	School	Conference	Record	Berth type
1	North Carolina	ACC	30-3	Automatic
2	Purdue	Big Ten	28-5	Automatic
3	Georgia	SEC	25-6	At-large
4	Texas A&M	Big 12	24-6	At-large
5	George Washington	Atlantic 10	26-3	At-large
6	Iowa State	Big 12	25-8	At-large
7	Georgia Tech	ACC	20-11	At-large
8	California	Pac-10	23-8	At-large
9	Notre Dame	Big East	19-11	At-large
10	DePaul	Big East	19-12	At-large
11	Washington	Pac-10	18-12	At-large
12	Boise State	WAC	24-8	Automatic
13	Texas-Arlington	Southland	24-8	Automatic
14	Belmont	Atlantic Sun	25-6	Automatic
15	Oral Roberts	Mid-Continent	22-10	Automatic
16	Prairie View A&M	SWAC	19-13	Automatic

Fresno RegionalSave Mart Center, Fresno, California
Seed	School	Conference	Record	Berth type
1	Connecticut	Big East	29-3	At-large
2	Stanford	Pac-10	28-4	Automatic
3	LSU	SEC	26-7	At-large
4	NC State	ACC	23-9	At-large
5	Baylor	Big 12	25-7	At-large
6	Xavier	Atlantic 10	26-7	Automatic
7	Old Dominion	CAA	24-8	Automatic
8	New Mexico	Mountain West	24-8	Automatic
9	Wisconsin-Green Bay	Horizon	28-3	Automatic
10	Florida State	ACC	22-9	At-large
11	West Virginia	Big East	20-10	At-large
12	Chattanooga	Southern	25-7	Automatic
13	Robert Morris	Northeast	24-7	Automatic
14	UNC-Asheville	Big South	21-11	Automatic
15	Idaho State	Big Sky	17-13	Automatic
16	UMBC	America East	16-16	Automatic

Dayton RegionalUniversity of Dayton Arena, Dayton, Ohio
Seed	School	Conference	Record	Berth type
1	Tennessee	SEC	28-3	At-large
2	Maryland	ACC	27-5	At-large
3	Oklahoma	Big 12	26-4	Automatic
4	Ohio State	Big Ten	28-3	At-large
5	Middle Tennessee	Sun Belt	29-3	Automatic
6	Marquette	Big East	25-6	At-large
7	Ole Miss	SEC	21-10	At-large
8	Pittsburgh	Big East	23-8	At-large
9	James Madison	CAA	27-5	At-large
10	TCU	Mountain West	21-10	At-large
11	Louisiana-Lafayette	Sun Belt	25-8	At-large
12	Gonzaga	West Coast	24-9	Automatic
13	Marist	MAAC	27-5	Automatic
14	Southeast Missouri State	Ohio Valley	24-7	Automatic
15	Harvard	Ivy	15-12	Automatic
16	Drake	Missouri Valley	14-18	Automatic

Greensboro RegionalGreensboro Coliseum, Greensboro, North Carolina
Seed	School	Conference	Record	Berth type
1	Duke	ACC	30-1	At-large
2	Vanderbilt	SEC	27-5	Automatic
3	Arizona State	Pac-10	28-4	At-large
4	Rutgers	Big East	22-8	Automatic
5	Michigan State	Big Ten	23-8	At-large
6	Louisville	Big East	26-7	At-large
7	Bowling Green	MAC	29-3	Automatic
8	Temple	Atlantic 10	24-7	At-large
9	Nebraska	Big 12	22-9	At-large
10	Oklahoma State	Big 12	20-10	At-large
11	BYU	Mountain West	23-9	At-large
12	Delaware	CAA	26-5	At-large
13	East Carolina	Conference USA	19-13	Automatic
14	UC Riverside	Big West	21-10	Automatic
15	Delaware State	MEAC	20-12	Automatic
16	Holy Cross	Patriot	15-17	Automatic

== Bids by conference ==
Thirty-one conferences earned an automatic bid. In twenty-one cases, the automatic bid was the only representative from the conference. Thirty-three additional at-large teams were selected from ten of the conferences.

Bids	Conference	Teams
8	Big East	Rutgers, Connecticut, DePaul, Louisville, Marquette, Notre Dame, Pittsburgh, West Virginia
6	Atlantic Coast	North Carolina, Duke, Florida St., Georgia Tech, Maryland, North Carolina St.
6	Big 12	Oklahoma, Baylor, Iowa St., Nebraska, Oklahoma St., Texas A&M
5	Southeastern	Vanderbilt, Georgia, LSU, Ole Miss, Tennessee
4	Pacific-10	Stanford, Arizona St., California, Washington
3	Atlantic 10	Xavier, George Washington, Temple
3	Big Ten	Purdue, Michigan St., Ohio St.
3	Colonial	Old Dominion, Delaware, James Madison
3	Mountain West	New Mexico, BYU, TCU
2	Sun Belt	Middle Tenn., La.-Lafayette
1	America East	UMBC
1	Atlantic Sun	Belmont
1	Big Sky	Idaho St.
1	Big South	UNC Asheville
1	Big West	UC Riverside
1	Conference USA	East Carolina
1	Horizon	Green Bay
1	Ivy	Harvard
1	Metro Atlantic	Marist
1	Mid-American	Bowling Green
1	Mid-Continent	Oral Roberts
1	Mid-Eastern	Delaware St.
1	Missouri Valley	Drake
1	Northeast	Robert Morris
1	Ohio Valley	Southeast Mo. St.
1	Patriot	Holy Cross
1	Southern	Chattanooga
1	Southland	Texas-Arlington
1	Southwestern	Prairie View
1	West Coast	Gonzaga
1	Western Athletic	Boise St.

== Bids by state ==
The sixty-four teams came from thirty-one states, plus Washington, D.C. Texas, Tennessee, and North Carolina had the most teams with five bids each. Nineteen states did not have any teams receiving bids.

NCAA Women's basketball Tournament invitations by state 2007

Bids	State	Teams
5	North Carolina	East Carolina, North Carolina, UNC Asheville, Duke, North Carolina St.
5	Tennessee	Belmont, Chattanooga, Middle Tenn., Vanderbilt, Tennessee
5	Texas	Prairie View, Texas-Arlington, Baylor, TCU, Texas A&M
3	California	Stanford, UC Riverside, California
3	Ohio	Bowling Green, Xavier, Ohio St.
3	Oklahoma	Oklahoma, Oral Roberts, Oklahoma St.
3	Pennsylvania	Robert Morris, Pittsburgh, Temple
2	Delaware	Delaware St., Delaware
2	Florida	Southeast Mo. St., Florida St.
2	Georgia	Georgia, Georgia Tech
2	Idaho	Boise St., Idaho St.
2	Indiana	Purdue, Notre Dame
2	Iowa	Drake, Iowa St.
2	Louisiana	La.-Lafayette, LSU
2	Maryland	UMBC, Maryland
2	Massachusetts	Harvard, Holy Cross
2	Virginia	Old Dominion, James Madison
2	Washington	Gonzaga, Washington
2	Wisconsin	Green Bay, Marquette
1	Arizona	Arizona St.
1	Connecticut	Connecticut
1	District of Columbia	George Washington
1	Illinois	DePaul
1	Kentucky	Louisville
1	Michigan	Michigan St.
1	Mississippi	Ole Miss
1	Nebraska	Nebraska
1	New Jersey	Rutgers
1	New Mexico	New Mexico
1	New York	Marist
1	Utah	BYU
1	West Virginia	West Virginia

== Brackets ==
Data source

(*) – Number of asterisks denotes number of overtimes.

=== Dallas Regional ===
First round March 17–18
1	North Carolina	95
16	Prairie View A&M	38
Pittsburgh, PA – Sun/Tue
8	California	59
9	Notre Dame	62
5	George Washington	76
12	Boise State	67
Los Angeles, CA – Sat/Mon
4	Texas A&M	58
13	Texas – Arlington	50
6	Iowa State	79
11	Washington	60
Minneapolis, MN – Sat/Mon
3	Georgia	53
14	Belmont	36
7	Georgia Tech	55
10	DePaul	54
Minneapolis, MN – Sat/Mon
2	Purdue	63
15	Oral Roberts	42

Second round March 19–20
1	North Carolina	60
9	Notre Dame	51
5	George Washington	59
4	Texas A&M	47
6	Iowa State	56
3	Georgia	76
7	Georgia Tech	63
2	Purdue	76

Regional semifinals March 25
1	North Carolina	70
5	George Washington	56
3	Georgia	65
2	Purdue	78

Regional finals March 27
1	North Carolina	84
2	Purdue	72

=== Dayton Regional ===
First round March 17–18
1	Tennessee	76
16	Drake	37
Pittsburgh, PA – Sun/Tue
8	Pittsburgh	71
9	James Madison	61
5	Middle Tennessee	85
12	Gonzaga	46
Stanford, CA – Sat/Mon
4	Ohio State	63
13	Marist	67
6	Marquette	87
11	Louisiana-Lafayette	58
Austin, TX – Sat/Mon
3	Oklahoma	74
14	SE Missouri State	60
7	Ole Miss	88
10	TCU	74
Hartford, CT – Sun/Tue
2	Maryland	89
15	Harvard	65

Second round March 19–20
1	Tennessee	68
8	Pittsburgh	54
5	Middle Tennessee	59
13	Marist	73
6	Marquette	47
3	Oklahoma	78
7	Ole Miss	89
2	Maryland	78

Regional semifinals March 25
1	Tennessee	65
13	Marist	46
3	Oklahoma	82
7	Ole Miss	90

Regional finals March 27
1	Tennessee	98
7	Ole Miss	62

=== Fresno Regional ===
First round March 17–18
1	Connecticut	82
16	UMBC	33
Hartford, CT – Sun/Tue
8	New Mexico	52
9	Green Bay	59
5	Baylor	68
12	Chattanooga	55
Raleigh, NC – Sun/Tue
4	NC State	84
13	Robert Morris	52
6	Xavier	52
11	West Virginia	65
Austin, TX – Sat/Mon
3	LSU	77
14	UNC-Asheville	39
7	Old Dominion	75
10	Florida State	85
Stanford, CA – Sat/Mon
2	Stanford	96
15	Idaho State	58

Second round March 19–20
1	Connecticut	94
9	Green Bay	70
5	Baylor	72
4	NC State	78*
11	West Virginia	43
3	LSU	49
10	Florida State	68
2	Stanford	61

Regional semifinals March 24
1	Connecticut	78
4	NC State	71
3	LSU	55
10	Florida State	43

Regional finals March 26
1	Connecticut	50
3	LSU	73

=== Greensboro Regional ===
First round March 17–18
1	Duke	81
16	Holy Cross	44
Raleigh, NC – Sun/Tue
8	Temple	64
9	Nebraska	61
5	Michigan State	69
12	Delaware	58
East Lansing, MI – Sun/Tue
4	Rutgers	77
13	East Carolina	34
6	Louisville	80
11	BYU	54
Los Angeles, CA – Sat/Mon
3	Arizona State	57
14	UC Riverside	50
7	Bowling Green	70
10	Oklahoma State	66
East Lansing, MI – Sun/Tue
2	Vanderbilt	62
15	Delaware State	47

Second round March 19–20
1	Duke	62
8	Temple	52
5	Michigan State	57
4	Rutgers	70
6	Louisville	58
3	Arizona State	67
7	Bowling Green	60
2	Vanderbilt	59

Regional semifinals March 24
1	Duke	52
4	Rutgers	53
3	Arizona State	67
7	Bowling Green	49

Regional finals March 26
4	Rutgers	64
3	Arizona State	45

=== Final Four – Cleveland, Ohio ===
National Semifinals; April 1
DAL1	North Carolina	50
DAY1	Tennessee	56
FRE3	LSU	35
GRE4	Rutgers	59

National Championship; April 3
DAY1	Tennessee	59
GRE4	Rutgers	46

Regional Initials: DAL-Dallas; DAY-Dayton; FRE-Fresno; GRE-Greensboro.

== Television and radio ==
As it had every year since 2003, ESPN and ESPN2 televised all 63 games. The first two rounds were presented on a regional basis. In some cases, a complete game of interest to a particular region were shown. However, most of the telecasts were in a "whip-around" format, with the specific game being shown changed on occasion and the endings to all close games or potential major upsets included. All games not shown on either ESPN or ESPN2 in a local market area were available to subscribers of ESPN Full Court, a pay-per-view package available on most major cable and satellite providers. Select games were also simulcast on ESPNU and ESPN360.

All games from the regional semifinals forward were televised nationally on either ESPN or ESPN2, in both standard-definition and high-definition formats. The Final Four was on ESPN. In addition, the championship game was presented in the ESPN Full Circle format.

ESPN had three announcers at each site: a play-by-play announcer, a color commentator, and a sideline reporter. (In contrast, CBS Sports, which covers nearly every game of the men's tournament, did not use sideline reporters until the Final Four.) Mike Patrick, Doris Burke, Holly Rowe and Mark Jones had those respective roles at the Final Four site in Cleveland. Patrick, Burke and Rowe also covered the Greensboro regional.

Burke, who had been a sideline reporter at previous Final Fours, replaced Ann Meyers, who had that role for the last ten years. Meyers is now the general manager of the Phoenix Mercury of the WNBA.

Other regional broadcast teams were:

- Dallas regional – Jones, Nancy Lieberman, and Rebecca Lobo
- Dayton regional – Dave Pasch, Debbie Antonelli, and Heather Cox
- Fresno regional – Pam Ward, Jimmy Dykes, and Beth Mowins

Some of the other ESPN commentators during earlier rounds included Linda Cohn, Dave Revsine, Dave Barnett, Fran Fraschilla, and Van Chancellor.

Trey Wingo was the studio host, with analysts Kara Lawson and Stacey Dales.

Mowins and Debbie Antonelli called the Final Four action on Westwood One radio.

== Comments ==
- Judy Southard, an athletics administrator at Louisiana State University, is the head of the Division I Women's Basketball Committee, which selected and seeded the teams for this event. Southard carried on her duties despite an ongoing scandal in which the head women's basketball coach, Pokey Chatman, resigned after it was alleged that she had an inappropriate sexual relationship with one of her former players. When asked about the scandal on the ESPN program announcing the tournament field and matchups, Southard declined to comment, saying that she wanted the focus to be on the players and teams in the tourney. Assistant coach Bob Starkey was named interim head coach and guided the Tigers to their fourth consecutive Final Four.
- This was the first tournament since the NCAA began sanctioning women's basketball in which Louisiana Tech is not a participant. This leaves Tennessee as the only program to appear in all 26 events.
- Texas was not in the tournament in consecutive seasons for the first time in its history. (At about the same moment that the selections were announced, Jody Conradt, who won 900 games and a championship during her tenure, resigned as the team's head coach.)
- Marist College was the first current MAAC participant to win in the NCAA tournament. The MAAC was previously 0–21 in the tournament under its current membership. Marist also matched the record for the lowest seed to advance to the Sweet Sixteen as a 13 seed. Texas A&M did so in 1994 and Liberty also accomplished this in 2005.
- The Bowling Green State University Falcons became the first team from the Mid American Conference to reach the Sweet Sixteen of the NCAA Division I women's basketball tournament, after they upset the second seed Vanderbilt 59–56 at the Breslin Student Events Center in East Lansing, Michigan in 2007.
- The Final Four logo features a guitar that resembles the Fender Stratocaster, marking the fact that Cleveland serves as the home of the Rock and Roll Hall of Fame. Also, the opening teases on the ESPN telecasts featured an actress playing a disc jockey and mock-up vinyl album covers with players and coaches pictured, to further advance the theme. At the Final Four, a picture of a guitar was applied onto the playing surface with a wood finish, and ESPN used classic rock and roll and R&B songs to lead out into some of the commercial breaks.
- Rutgers' Cinderella performance in the NCAA tournament was the indirect catalyst of a chain of events that led to CBS Radio firing nationally syndicated radio host Don Imus and to a car accident that nearly killed New Jersey governor Jon Corzine. After their underdog performance, Imus mentioned the Rutgers women's basketball team in his radio program, where he referred to the team as "nappy-headed hos", which resulted in his radio show being canceled by CBS Radio and MSNBC on April 12, 2007. In an attempt to apologize to the Rutgers' basketball team, Don Imus apologized to the Rutgers team in person at the New Jersey governor's mansion in Princeton, New Jersey. The meeting was also to be attended by Corzine, but on his way to the meeting, he was involved in an auto accident that left him in critical condition.

== Record by conference ==
Conference	# of Bids	Record	Win %	Round of 32	Sweet Sixteen	Elite Eight	Final Four	Championship Game
Big East	8	13–8	.619	7	2	2	1	1
Atlantic Coast	6	12–6	.667	6	4	1	1	0
Big 12	6	5–6	.455	4	1	0	0	0
Southeastern	5	16–4	.800	5	4	3	2	1
Pacific-10	4	4–4	.500	2	1	1	0	0
Big Ten	3	4–3	.571	2	1	1	0	0
Atlantic 10	3	3–3	.500	2	1	0	0	0
Colonial	3	0–3	.000	0	0	0	0	0
Mountain West	3	0–3	.000	0	0	0	0	0
Sun Belt	2	1–2	.333	1	0	0	0	0
Metro Atlantic	1	2–1	.667	1	1	0	0	0
Mid-American	1	2–1	.667	1	1	0	0	0
Horizon	1	1–1	.500	1	0	0	0	0

Eighteen conferences went 0-1: America East, Atlantic Sun Conference, Big Sky Conference, Big South Conference, Big West Conference, Conference USA, Ivy League, Mid-Continent, MEAC, Missouri Valley Conference, Northeast Conference, Ohio Valley Conference, Patriot League, Southern Conference, Southland, SWAC, West Coast Conference, and WAC

== All-Tournament Team ==
- Candace Parker, Tennessee
- Matee Ajavon, Rutgers
- Nicky Anosike, Tennessee
- Shannon Bobbitt, Tennessee
- Kia Vaughn, Rutgers

== Game Officials ==
- Bob Trammell (semifinal)
- Clarke Stevens (semifinal)
- Eric Brewton (semifinal)
- Dee Kantner (semifinal)
- Denise Brooks-Clauser (semifinal)
- Mary Day (semifinal)
- Lisa Mattingly (final)
- Michael Price (final)
- Tina Napier (final)

== See also ==
- NCAA Women's Division I Basketball Championship
- 2007 NCAA Division I men's basketball tournament
- 2007 NAIA Division I men's basketball tournament
