= 2006–07 North Carolina Tar Heels women's basketball team =

Intercollegiate basketball season

2006–07 North Carolina Tar Heels women's basketball

ACC Tournament Champions

NCAA Tournament, final Four
- Conference: Atlantic Coast Conference

Ranking
- Coaches: No. 3
- AP: No. 2
- Record: 34–4 (11–3 ACC)
- Head coach: Sylvia Hatchell
- Assistant coaches: Andrew Calder; Tracey Williams-Johnson; Charlotte Smith
- Home arena: Carmichael Auditorium

== Roster ==
Name	#	Height	Position	Year	Home town
Erlana Larkins	2	6-1	Forward	Junior	Riviera Beach, FL
Trinity Bursey	3	5-10	Forward	Freshman	Sanford, NC
Alex Miller	11	5-6	Guard	Junior	Durham, NC
Ivory Latta	12	5-6	Guard	Senior	McConnells, SC
Heather Claytor	14	5-8	Guard	Sophomore	Grottoes, VA
Christina Dewitt	15	6-2	Forward	Sophomore	Little River, SC
Camille Little	20	6-2	Forward / guard	Senior	Winston-Salem, NC
Iman McFarland	21	6-3	Forward	Sophomore	Temple Hills, MD
Meghan Austin	24	5-7	Guard	Junior	Lynchburg, VA
LaToya Pringle	30	6-3	Forward / center	Junior	Fayetteville, NC
Rashanda McCants	32	6-1	Forward	Sophomore	Asheville, NC
Martina Wood	34	6-2	Forward / center	Sophomore	Charlotte, NC
Jessica Breland	51	6-3	Forward	Freshman	Kelford, NC

== Schedule and results ==
Date time, TV	Rank^{#}	Opponent^{#}	Result	Record	Site city, state
October 31*		Premier Players; Exhibition	W 94-69		Carmichael Auditorium; Chapel Hill, NC
November 5*		Carson-Newman; Exhibition	W 104-44		Carmichael Auditorium; Chapel Hill, NC
November 10*	No. 2	East Tennessee State	W 96-35	1-0	Carmichael Auditorium; Chapel Hill, NC
November 12*	No. 2	Winston-Salem State	W 83-32	2-0	Carmichael Auditorium; Chapel Hill, NC
November 17*	No. 2	Elon	W 90-36	3-0	Carmichael Auditorium; Chapel Hill, NC
November 24*	No. 2	vs. Sacramento State; Rainbow Wahine Classic First Round	W 99-38	4-0	Stan Sheriff Center; Honolulu, HI
November 25*	No. 2	vs. Gonzaga; Rainbow Wahine Classic Semifinal	W 101-63	5-0	Stan Sheriff Center; Honolulu, HI
November 26*	No. 2	vs. Arkansas; Rainbow Wahine Classic Championship Game	W 94-69	6-0	Stan Sheriff Center; Honolulu, HI
November 30*	No. 2	UNC Greensboro	W 103-48	7-0	Carmichael Auditorium; Chapel Hill, NC
December 3* ESPN	No. 2	No. 4 Tennessee	W 70-57	8-0	Carmichael Auditorium; Chapel Hill, NC
December 6*	No. 2	Wofford	W 95-36	9-0	Carmichael Auditorium; Chapel Hill, NC
December 10*	No. 2	Western Carolina	W 87-58	10-0	Carmichael Auditorium; Chapel Hill, NC
December 16*	No. 2	South Carolina State	W 92-42	11-0	Carmichael Auditorium; Chapel Hill, NC
December 18*	No. 2	vs. Coastal Carolina	W 87-48	12-0	Myrtle Beach Convention Center; Myrtle Beach, SC
December 20*	No. 2	vs. St John's	W 87-43	13-0	Myrtle Beach Convention Center; Myrtle Beach, SC
December 28*	No. 2	Delaware State	W 87-40	14-0	Carmichael Auditorium; Chapel Hill, NC
December 30*	No. 2	Tennessee Tech	W 93-52	15-0	Carmichael Auditorium; Chapel Hill, NC
January 2	No. 2	at Georgia Tech	W 78-31	16-0 (1-0)	Alexander Memorial Coliseum; Atlanta, GA
January 4	No. 2	Virginia Tech	W 102-68	17-0 (2-0)	Carmichael Auditorium; Chapel Hill, NC
January 8 FSN South	No. 2	Virginia	W 96-62	18-0 (3-0)	Carmichael Auditorium; Chapel Hill, NC
January 11	No. 2	at Clemson	W 100-65	19-0 (4-0)	Littlejohn Coliseum; Clemson, SC
January 15*; ESPN2	No. 2	No. 5 Connecticut	W 82-76	20-0	Carmichael Auditorium; Chapel Hill, NC
January 18	No. 2	Georgia Tech	W 78-31	21-0 (5-0)	Carmichael Auditorium; Chapel Hill, NC
January 21	No. 2	North Carolina State	W 86-65	22-0 (6-0)	Carmichael Auditorium; Chapel Hill, NC
January 28; ESPN2	No. 2	at No. 3 Maryland	W 84-71	23-0 (7-0)	Comcast Center; College Park, MD
February 1	No. 2	at Boston College	W 82-60	24-0 (8-0)	Conte Forum; Chestnut Hill, MA
February 8 ESPN2	No. 2	No. 1 Duke	L 53-64	24-1 (8-1)	Carmichael Auditorium; Chapel Hill, NC
February 12; FSN South	No. 2	at Florida State	W 80-59	25-1 (9-1)	Donald L. Tucker Center; Tallahassee, FL
February 16; FSN South	No. 2	at North Carolina State	L 65-72	25-2 (9-2)	Reynolds Coliseum; Raleigh, NC
February 18	No. 2	Miami	W 93-70	26-2 (10-2)	Carmichael Auditorium; Chapel Hill, NC
February 22	No. 4	Wake Forest	W 96-47	27-2 (11-2)	Carmichael Auditorium; Chapel Hill, NC
February 25; ESPN	No. 4	at No. 1 Duke	L 62-67	27-3 (11-3)	Cameron Indoor Stadium; Durham, NC
March 2	No. 4	vs. Virginia Tech; ACC Tournament Quarterfinals	W 90-60	28-3	Greensboro Coliseum; Greensboro, NC
March 3 FSN	No. 4	vs. No. 5 Maryland; ACC Tournament Semifinals	W 78-72	29-3	Greensboro Coliseum; Greensboro, NC
March 4 FSN	No. 4	vs. No. 25 North Carolina State; ACC Tournament Championship Game	W 60-54	30-3 (11,538)	Greensboro Coliseum; Greensboro, NC
March 18*; ESPN	No. 3	vs. Prairie View A&M; NCAA Tournament First Round	W 95-38	31-3	Petersen Events Center; Pittsburgh, PA
March 20*; ESPN2	No. 3	vs. Notre Dame; NCAA Tournament Second Round	W 60-51	32-3	Petersen Events Center; Pittsburgh, PA
March 25*; ESPN2	No. 3	vs. No. 13 George Washington; NCAA Tournament Sweet Sixteen	W 70-56	33-3	Reunion Arena; Dallas, TX
March 27*; ESPN	No. 3	vs. No. 12 Purdue; NCAA Tournament Elite Eight	W 84-72	34-3	Reunion Arena; Dallas, TX
April 1* ESPN	No. 3	vs. No. 4 Tennessee; NCAA Tournament Final Four	L 50-56	34-4	Quicken Loans Arena; Cleveland, OH
*Non-conference game. ^{#}Rankings from Coaches' Poll. (#) Tournament seedings in parentheses. All times are in Eastern Time.

== Standings ==
ACC	Conference			Overall	
ACC	W-L	GB	PCT	W-L	PCT
#1 Duke	14-0	-	1.000	32-2	.941
#3 North Carolina	11-3	3	.786	34-3	.919
#5 Maryland	10-4	4	.714	28-6	.824
#20 North Carolina State	10-4	4	.714	25-10	.714
Florida State	10-4	4	.714	24-10	.706
Georgia Tech	10-5	4 1/2	.667	21-12	.636
Virginia Tech	6-8	8	.429	19-15	.559
Virginia	5-9	9	.357	19-15	.559
Clemson	4-10	10	.286	12-18	.400
Boston College	3-11	11	.214	13-16	.448
Miami	2-12	12	.143	11-19	.367
Wake Forest	0-14	14	.000	9-20	.310
