= Sylvia Fowles =

American basketball player (born 1985)

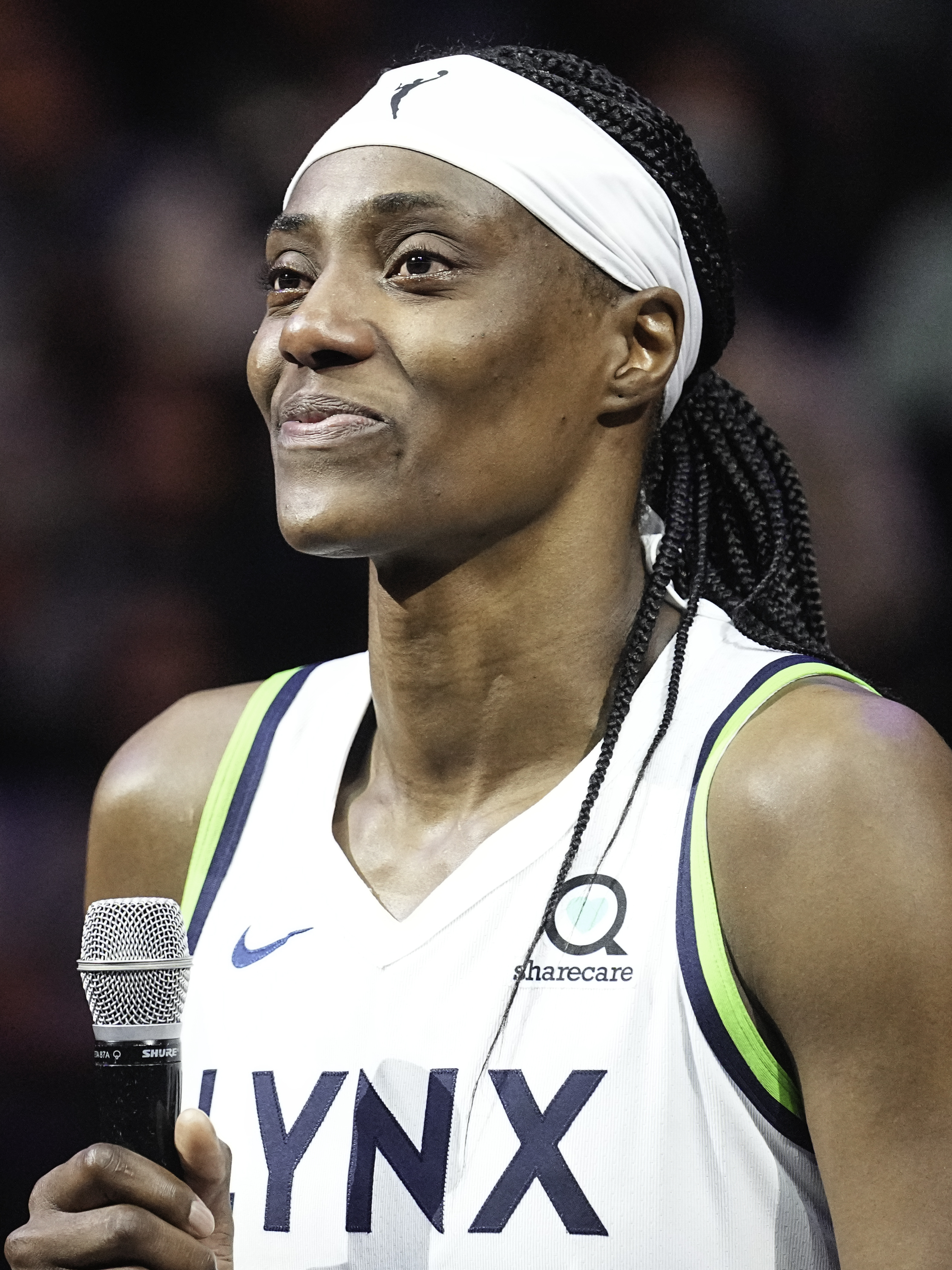
- Fowles in 2022

Portland Fire
- Title: Assistant coach
- League: WNBA

Personal information
- Born: October 6, 1985 (age 41) Miami, Florida, U.S.
- Listed height: 6 ft 6 in (1.98 m)
- Listed weight: 219 lb (99 kg)

Career information
- High school: Miami Edison (Miami, Florida); Gulliver Preparatory (Coral Gables, Florida)
- College: LSU (2004–2008)
- WNBA draft: 2008: 1st round, 2nd overall pick
- Drafted by: Chicago Sky
- Playing career: 2008–2022
- Position: Center
- Number: 34
- Coaching career: 2026–present

Career history

Playing
- 2008–2014: Chicago Sky
- 2008–2010: Spartak Moscow
- 2010–2013: Galatasaray Medical Park
- 2013–2015: Shanghai Swordfish
- 2015: Canik Belediyesi
- 2015–2018: Beijing Great Wall
- 2015–2022: Minnesota Lynx

Coaching
- 2026–present: Portland Fire (assistant)

Career highlights
- 2× WNBA champion (2015, 2017); 2× WNBA Finals MVP (2015, 2017); WNBA MVP (2017); 8× WNBA All-Star (2009, 2011, 2013, 2017–2019, 2021, 2022); 3× All-WNBA First Team (2010, 2013, 2017); 5× All-WNBA Second Team (2011, 2012, 2016, 2021, 2022); 4× WNBA Defensive Player of the Year (2011, 2013, 2016, 2021); 8× WNBA All-Defensive First Team (2010–2013, 2016, 2017, 2021, 2022); 3× WNBA All-Defensive Second Team (2008, 2014, 2018); 2× WNBA blocks leader (2010, 2011); 3× WNBA rebounding champion (2013, 2018, 2022); 3× WNBA Peak Performer (2013, 2018, 2022); WNBA All-Rookie Team (2008); Kim Perrot Sportsmanship Award (2022); WNBA 25th Anniversary Team (2021); 2× WCBA champion (2016, 2017); 3× Turkish Cup winner (2011–2013); 2× Europe SuperCup winner (2009, 2010); 2× EuroLeague champion (2009, 2010); WBCA Defensive Player of the Year (2008); 2× All-American – USBWA, Kodak/State Farm Coaches' (2007, 2008); First-team All-American – AP (2008); Second-team All-American – AP (2007); Third-team All-American – AP (2006); SEC Player of the Year (2008); SEC Defensive Player of the Year (2008); SEC All-Defensive Team (2008); 3× First-team All-SEC (2006–2008); SEC Sixth Player of the Year (2005); SEC All-Freshman Team (2005); McDonald's All-American (2004); No. 34 retired by Minnesota Lynx; No. 34 retired by LSU Lady Tigers

Career WNBA statistics
- Points: 6,415 (15.7 ppg)
- Rebounds: 4,006 (9.8 rpg)
- Assists: 461 (1.1 apg)
- Stats at WNBA.com
- Stats at Basketball Reference
- Basketball Hall of Fame
- Women's Basketball Hall of Fame
Medals
Women's basketball
Representing the United States
Olympic Games
Gold medal – first place	2008 Beijing	Team
Gold medal – first place	2012 London	Team
Gold medal – first place	2016 Rio de Janeiro	Team
Gold medal – first place	2020 Tokyo	Team
FIBA AmeriCup
Gold medal – first place	2019 Puerto Rico	Team
World Championship
Gold medal – first place	2010 Czech Republic
World University Games
Gold medal – first place	2005 Izmir	Team

Sylvia Shaqueria Fowles (born October 6, 1985) is an American professional basketball coach and former player who is an assistant coach for the Portland Fire of the Women's National Basketball Association (WNBA). She previously played for the Chicago Sky and Minnesota Lynx during her WNBA career. She won the WNBA MVP Award in 2017 and the WNBA Defensive Player of the Year award four times (2011, 2013, 2016, 2021). She led the Lynx to win the WNBA Championship in 2015 and 2017, and she was named the MVP of the WNBA Finals both times. In 2020, Fowles overtook Rebekkah Brunson to become the WNBA's career leader in rebounds. In 2025, Fowles was inducted into the Women's Basketball Hall of Fame and the Naismith Hall of Fame.

== Early life ==
Fowles was born in Miami, Florida, the daughter of Arrittio Fowles. She has three brothers, Walter, Jeremy, Morris, and one sister, Dorothy. Fowles grew up in some of the rougher neighborhoods of Miami-Dade, including Coconut Grove, Little Haiti, and the Victory Home Housing Projects. She attended Little River Elementary School, Horace Mann Middle School, Miami Edison Senior High School and graduated from Gulliver Preparatory School.

She also led Edison Senior High School to two state championships before transferring to Gulliver Preparatory School. Fowles averaged 20.6 points and 11.6 rebounds at Gulliver and led them to the class 3A state championship against East Gadsden High School. Fowles was also named a McDonald's All-American. Fowles was named a WBCA All-American. She participated in the 2004 WBCA High School All-America Game, where she scored fifteen points, and earned MVP honors.

== College career ==
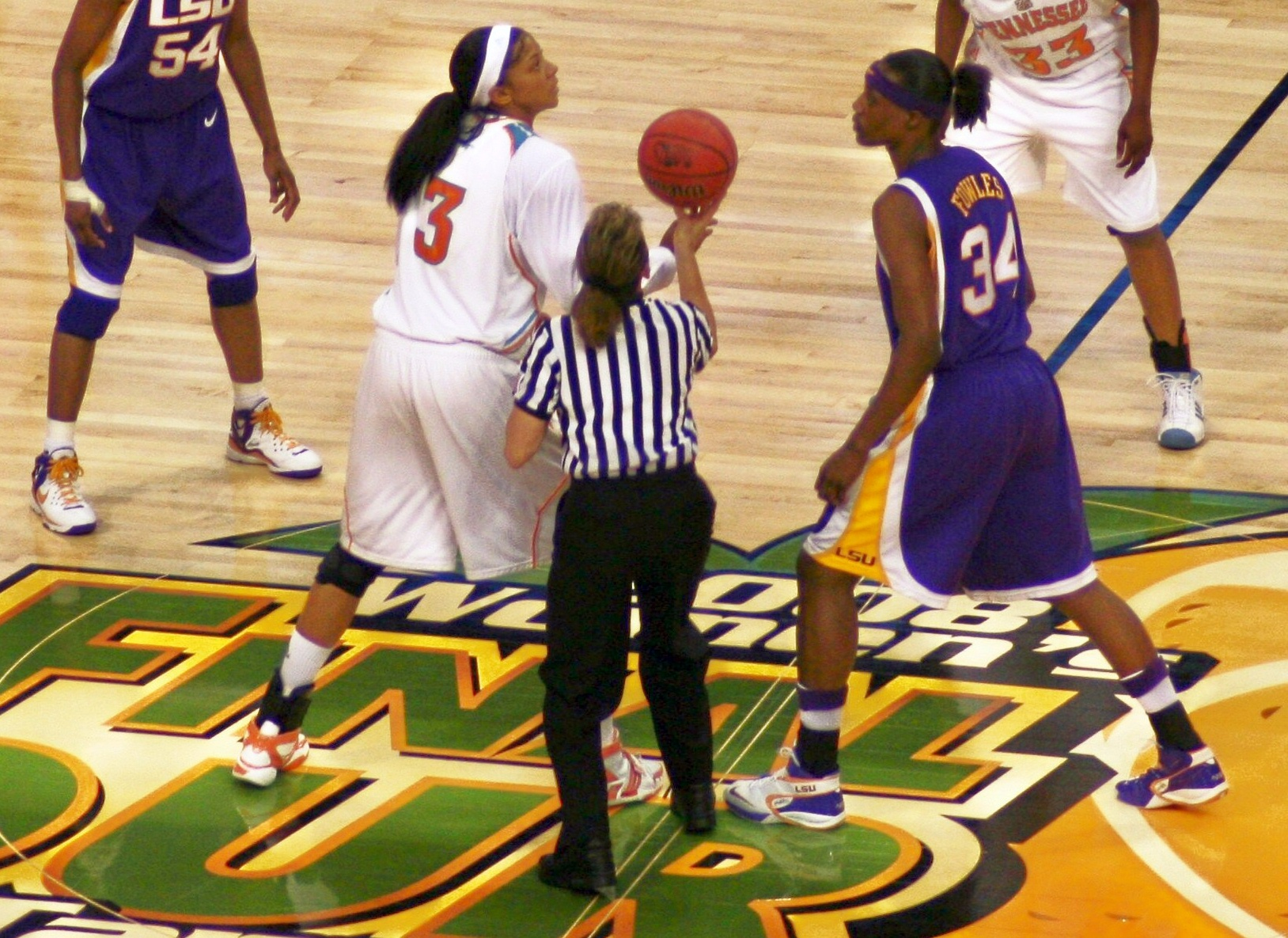
Fowles (right, #34) pitted against Candace Parker in the opening tipoff of the 2008 NCAA Final Four

Fowles played in all 36 of LSU's games as a freshman, helping the team to an appearance in the NCAA Final Four. As a sophomore, she started all 35 games and again helped the team reach the Final Four. In her junior year, she led LSU to the Final Four again and earned All-American honours.

Fowles was named to the pre-season All-American team prior to her senior season. She dunked the ball in the Lady Tigers' game against the University of Louisiana at Lafayette on November 21, 2007, becoming the sixth woman to dunk in an American college game.

In December 2007, Fowles suffered a partial tear of the meniscus of her right knee during a game against the University of Miami. She then underwent surgery and missed several weeks of play.

Fowles was named the 2008 SEC Player of the Year. During a March 24, 2008 NCAA Tournament game, she broke the all-time SEC record for career rebounds. She led LSU to the Final Four again in her senior year.

Fowles finished additional academic credits after beginning her professional basketball career and received her bachelor's degree from LSU in the spring of 2009.

During her college career at LSU, Fowles had also played with future WNBA teammate Seimone Augustus. On May 15, 2017, it was announced that Fowles' uniform number (34) will be retired by LSU during the 2017–18 season. She is the second women's basketball player in school history to receive that honor.

== Professional career ==
=== WNBA ===
==== Chicago Sky (2008–2014) ====
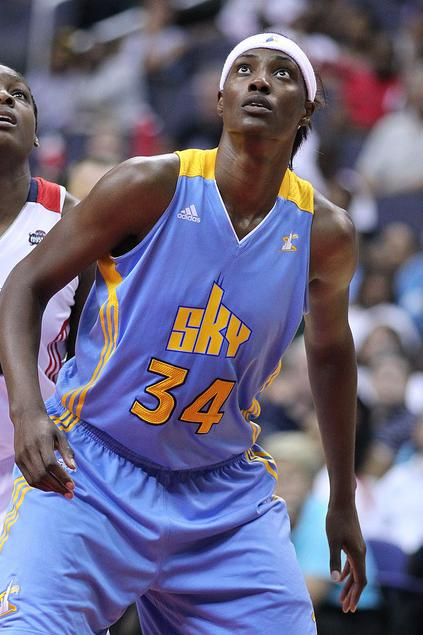
Fowles with the Chicago Sky in 2011

Fowles was selected 2nd overall by the Chicago Sky in the 2008 WNBA draft. After being drafted second overall, Fowles entered the Sky's rotation in the starting lineup and averaged 10.8 points, 7.6 rebounds per game and 2.1 blocks per game in her rookie season. However, her rookie season was shortened due to a knee injury as she played only 17 games with 14 starts.

After establishing herself as a solid inside scorer, tenacious rebounder and elite rim protector in her rookie season, Fowles would earn her first career WNBA all-star selection in 2009. She averaged 11.3 points per game, 7.8 rebounds per game and 1.5 blocks per game. However, injuries would once again shorten her season as she missed 10 games.

Fowles dunked on her second attempt during the 2009 WNBA All-Star Game while representing the Eastern Conference after everyone on both teams cleared out of her way. Her first attempt clanged off the bottom of the rim. The game took place on July 25, 2009 at Mohegan Sun, the home of the Connecticut Sun. She is the third WNBA player to dunk in an all star game, following Michelle Snow in 2006 and Lisa Leslie in 2005.

During the 2010 season, Fowles scored a career-high 35 points in a 97–96 loss to the Phoenix Mercury. She had also led the league in blocks with a career-high average of 2.6 blocks per game. For her shot blocking efforts, she would be named to WNBA All-Defensive First Team.

In the 2011 season, Fowles was voted as a WNBA all-star for the second time in her career. She had averaged a double-double in points and rebounds for the whole season with a career-high 20 points per game and 10.2 rebounds per game, she also led the league in blocks for the second year in the row, averaging 2.0 blocks per game. She would win WNBA Defensive Player of the Year.

In 2012, Fowles re-signed with the Sky to a multi-year deal once her rookie contract expired.

In the 2014 season, Fowles averaged a double-double in points and rebounds for the fourth consecutive season, which would help the Sky make the playoffs. Fowles eventually would earn her first career Finals appearance as the Sky had advanced all the way to the WNBA Finals despite a 15–19 record and the number four seed in the Eastern Conference. The Sky faced the 29–5 Phoenix Mercury and were defeated in a 3-game sweep. It would be Fowles's final season playing with the Sky.

==== Minnesota Lynx (2015–2022) ====
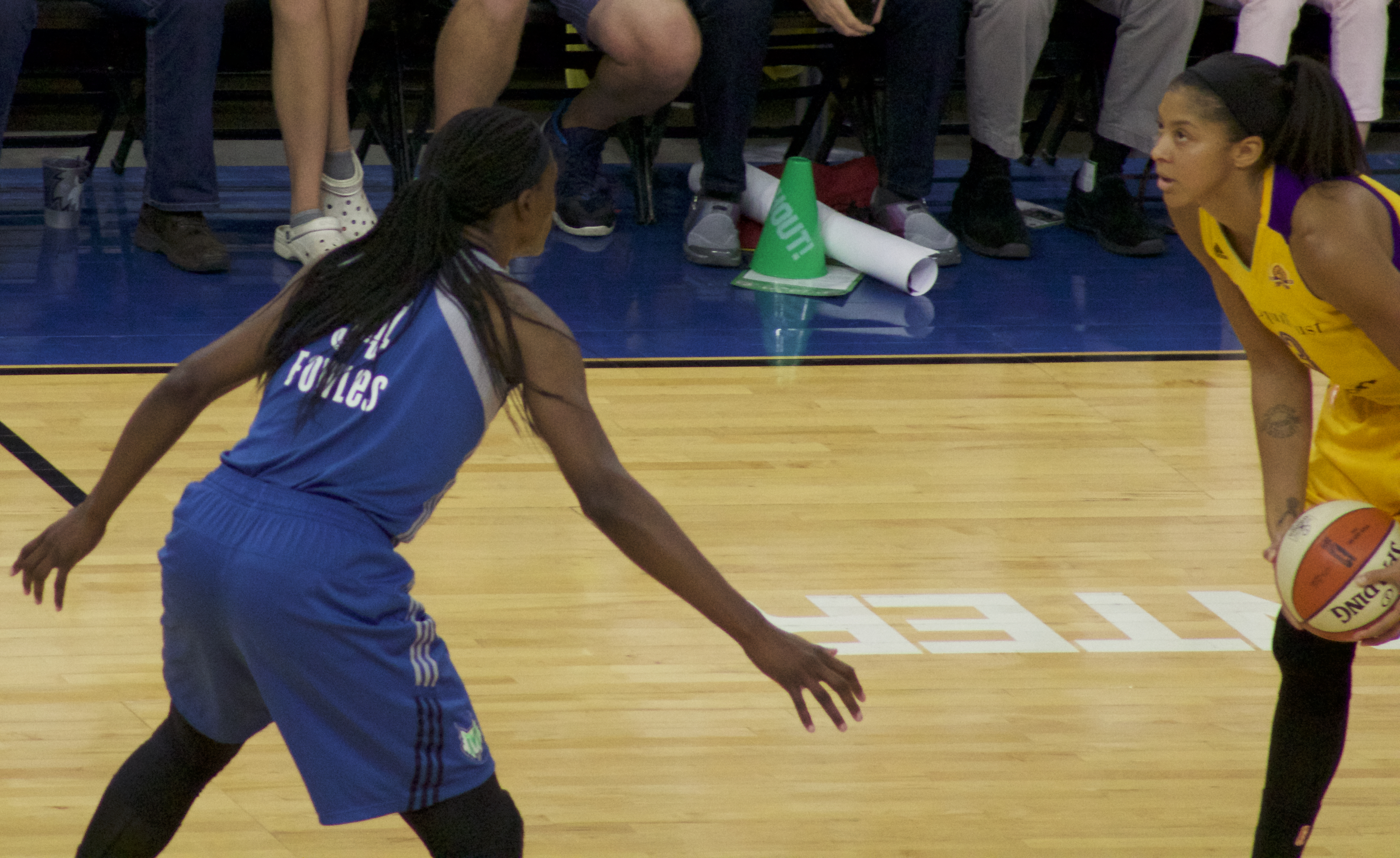
Fowles guarding Candace Parker in 2016. The New York Times says Fowles has "great agility and a spacious wingspan."

Fowles turned down a contract extension offer with the Sky in September 2014. She requested a trade but no trade offers from other teams for her had been sufficient. She sat out the first half of the 2015 WNBA season until she was traded to the Minnesota Lynx on July 27, 2015 as part of a three-team deal that sent Érika de Souza to the Sky and Damiris Dantas and Reshanda Gray to the Atlanta Dream. Joining forces with Maya Moore, Seimone Augustus and Lindsay Whalen, the Lynx were a powerhouse in the Western Conference, finishing first place and advancing all the way to the WNBA Finals, facing the Indiana Fever. With the series tied 2–2 in the decisive game 5, Fowles proved to be relentless against the Fever, scoring 20 points along with 11 rebounds in a 69–52 victory. She was named the WNBA Finals MVP as the Lynx won their third WNBA Championship in five years.

Following her first WNBA Championship victory, Fowles re-signed with the Lynx during free agency in February 2016.

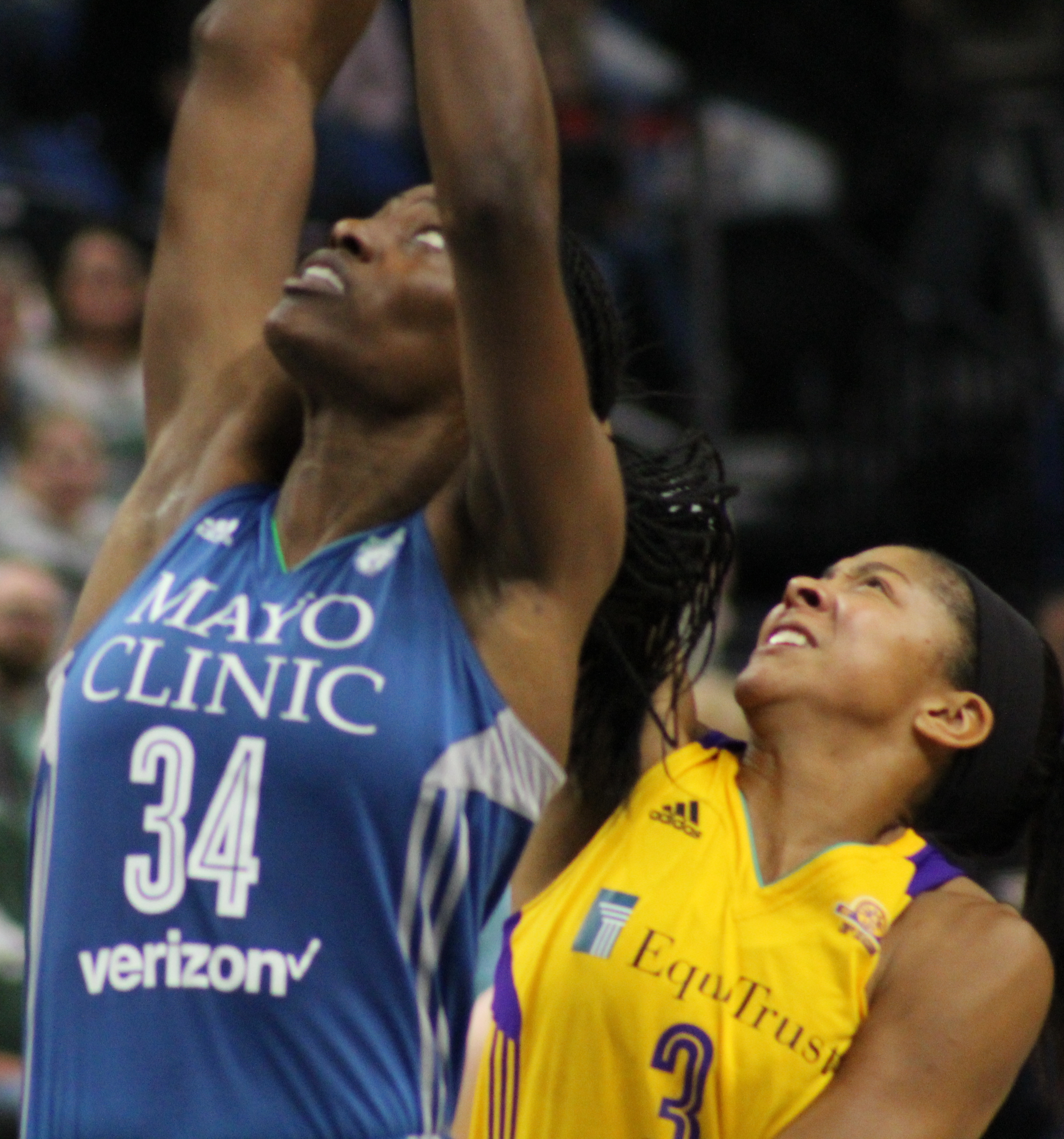
Fowles and Parker

During the 2016 season, Fowles averaged 13.9 points per game, 8.5 rebounds per game and 1.7 blocks per game. She would win Defensive Player of the Year for the third time in her career. The Lynx remained a championship contending team, finishing with a franchise best 28–6 record. With the WNBA's new playoff format in effect, the Lynx were the number 1 seed in the league with a double-bye to the semi-finals (the last round before the WNBA Finals) facing the Phoenix Mercury. The Lynx defeated the Mercury in a 3-game sweep, advancing to the WNBA Finals for the fifth time in six years. The Lynx were up against the Los Angeles Sparks, making it the second time in league history where two teams from the same conference faced each other in the Finals due to the new playoff format. However, the Lynx were defeated by the Sparks in a hard-fought five-game series.

In the 2017 season, Fowles would be the focal point of the Lynx's offense, leading the team in scoring. Fowles scored 26 points along with 10 rebounds in the Lynx's season home opener against her former team, the Chicago Sky in a 70–61 victory. On June 11, 2017, Fowles scored a season-high 30 points along with 9 rebounds in a 91–74 victory over the Dallas Wings. Fowles was also voted into the 2017 WNBA All-Star Game, making it her fourth career all-star appearance. On August 12, 2017, the Lynx made history as they defeated the Indiana Fever 111–52, marking it the largest margin of victory in WNBA history, they also exploded on a league record 37-0 scoring run during the game. Fowles finished off the season averaging a double-double in points and rebounds for the fourth time in her career and also led the league in field goal shooting for the fifth time in her career. The Lynx would once again finish with the league's best record of 27–7, earning the number 1 seed with a double-bye to the semi-finals. On September 14, 2017, the WNBA announced that Fowles won the WNBA Most Valuable Player Award (Fowles had received 35 of 40 first-place votes from a national panel of sportswriters and broadcasters).

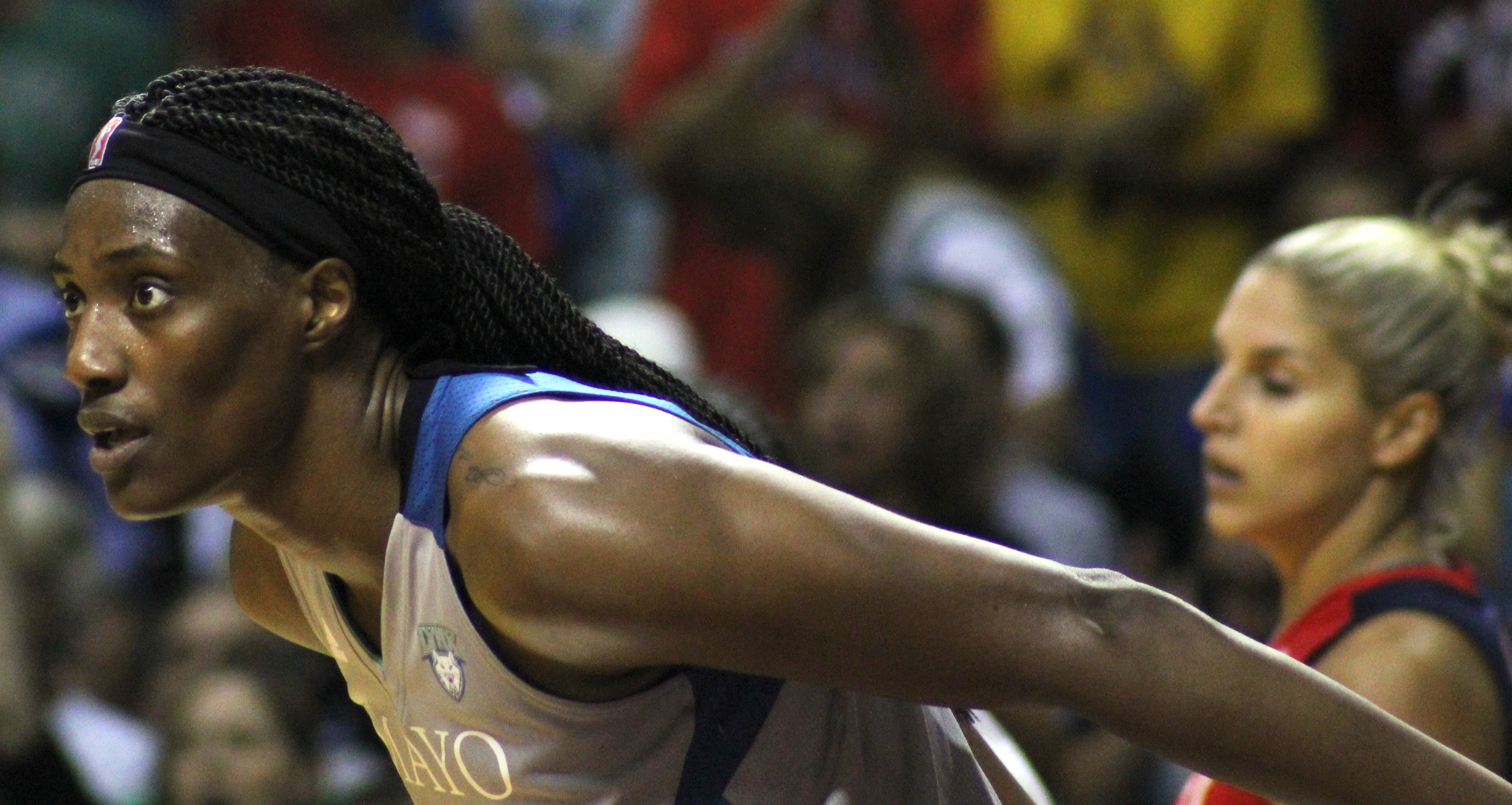
Fowles and Elena Delle Donne of the Mystics during the 2017 semifinals

In the semi-finals, the Lynx defeated the Washington Mystics in a 3-game sweep, advancing to the WNBA Finals for the sixth time in seven years, setting up a rematch with the Sparks. With the series tied 2-2, Fowles set the Finals record for most rebounds in a game with 20 rebounds along with 17 points in Game 5 of the 2017 WNBA Finals, helping the Lynx win the game 85-76 and their fourth WNBA championship in seven years, tying the now-defunct Houston Comets for most championship titles. Fowles would also win her second Finals MVP award, becoming the fifth player in league history to win regular season MVP and Finals MVP in the same season.

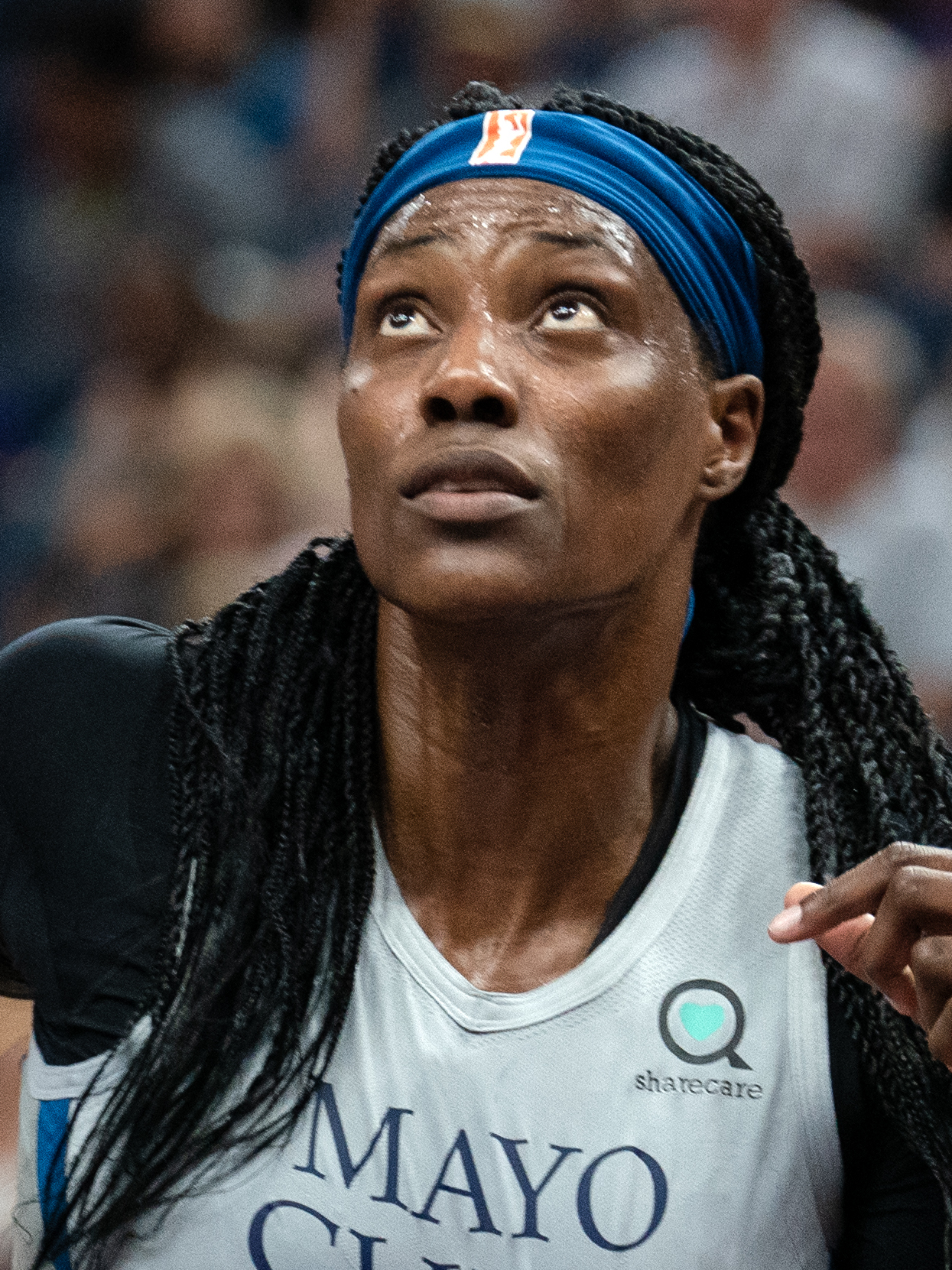
Fowles in 2019

On May 23, 2018, Fowles put on a historic performance in a 76–68 victory against the Dallas Wings in which scored 23 points along with 20 rebounds and 5 steals, becoming the first player in Lynx franchise history to have a 20-point, 20-rebound performance, secondly making it the 18th in league history and also marking the league's first ever stat line of 20 points, 20 rebounds and 5 steals. Fowles would be voted into the 2018 WNBA All-Star Game, making it her fifth all-star game appearance. On July 19, 2018, Fowles scored a season-high 30 points along with 16 rebounds in an 89–65 win over the Indiana Fever. In 2018, Fowles was chosen All-WNBA second team, Associated Press WNBA Defensive Player of the Year for the 4th time, and she broke the single-season record for rebounds with 404. Fowles would lead the league in field goal percentage and rebounds and tied the record for highest rebound per game average in a season, but the Lynx finished 18–16 with the number 7 seed, making it the first time in 8 years they did not finish as a top 2 seed. They lost in the first round elimination game to the rival Los Angeles Sparks 75–68, ending their streak of three consecutive finals appearances.

In 2019, Fowles was voted into the 2019 WNBA All-Star Game, making it her sixth all-star appearance. On August 27, 2019, Fowles scored a season-high 25 points in a 93–85 victory against the Chicago Sky. On September 8, 2019, Fowles signed a multi-year contract extension with the Lynx. By the end of the season, Fowles led the league in field goal percentage for the third consecutive season. With Maya Moore sitting out the entire season, the Lynx were still a playoff team as they finished as the number 7 seed with a 18–16 record. The Lynx were eliminated in the first round elimination game 84–74 by the defending champion Seattle Storm.

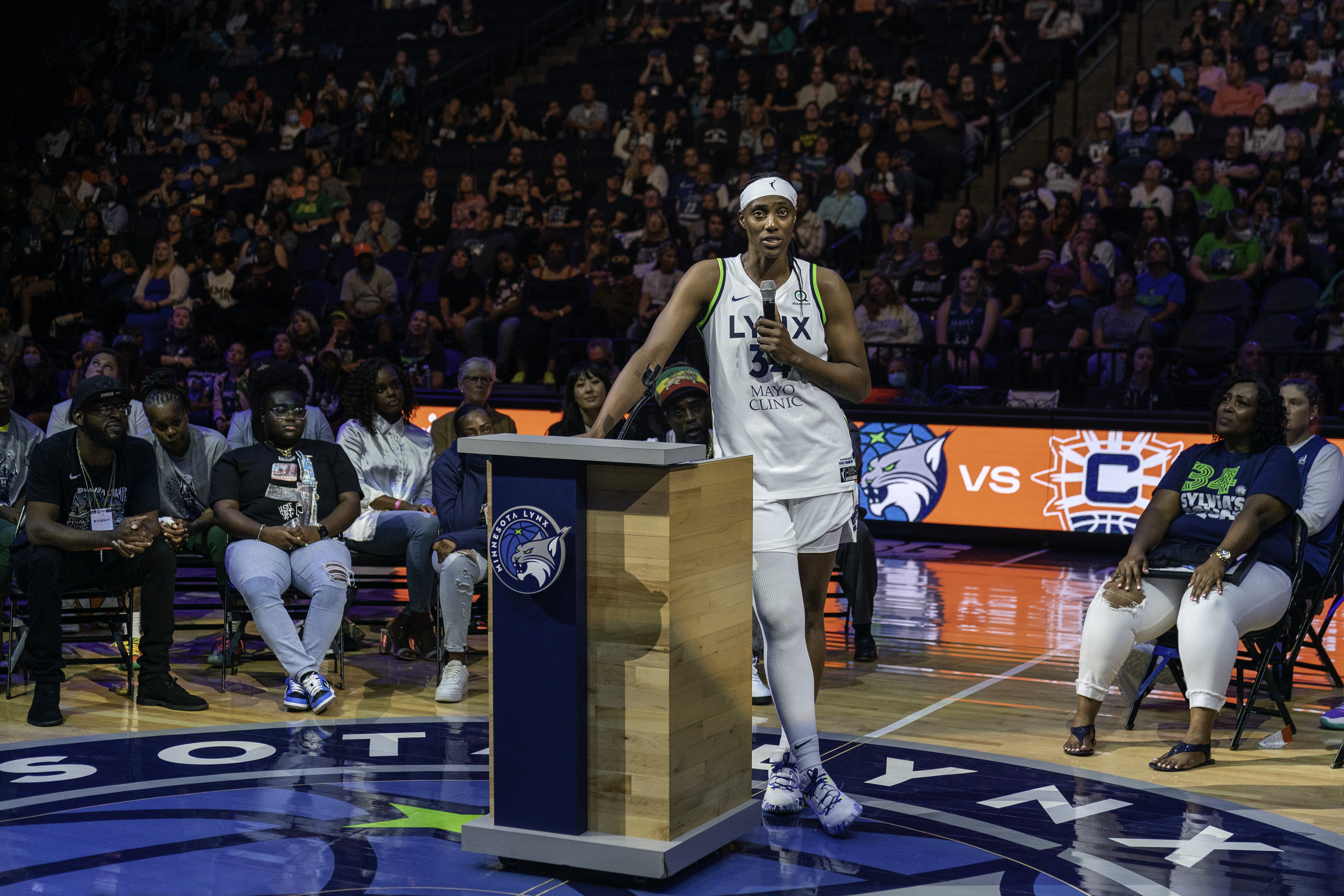
Sylvia Fowles addresses fans during a tribute to her after her final home game before retiring

In 2020, the season was delayed and shortened to 22 games in a bubble at IMG Academy due to the COVID-19 pandemic. On July 29, 2020, Fowles grabbed her 3,357th career rebound during the second game of the 2020 season to surpass Rebekkah Brunson, who happened to be the assistant coach of the Lynx at the time, and became the WNBA all-time leading rebounder. She finished the game with 15 points and 10 rebounds, bringing her total career rebounds to 3,360. On August 14, 2020, Fowles suffered a calf injury and was ruled out indefinitely, causing her to miss the rest of the regular season. Fowles would make her return just in time for the playoffs. The Lynx finished 14–8 with the number 4 seed, receiving a bye to the second round. In the second round elimination game, the Lynx beat the Phoenix Mercury 80–79, advancing the franchise back to the semi-finals. However, in the semi-finals, they would get swept by the Seattle Storm who would end up being the eventual champions, Fowles was unable to play for the entire series.

In 2021 Fowles won her fourth WNBA Defensive Player of the Year joining Tamika Catchings as the only player with 4 Defensive Player of the Year Awards averaging a career high 1.8 steals and also averaging 1.8 blocks. During that season, she was named to The W25, the league's official list of the top 25 players of its first 25 seasons.

Fowles retired from the WNBA after the 2022 season with the Lynx. The WNBA bestowed the Kim Perrot Sportsmanship Award to Fowles in her final season in 2022. The Minnesota Lynx retired her jersey on June 11, 2023. In 2023, the Lynx also created the Sylvia Fowles Altruism Award for the Lynx player who "best embodies the altruistic traits of kindness, selflessness and overall regard for the well-being of others throughout the community." The award is decided by a panel of team staff and players. In 2023, Fowles was also honored as part of the All-25 Team of the top 25 players in the team's history.

It was announced in November of 2024 that Fowles was named to the class of 2025 Women's Basketball Hall of Fame.

=== Overseas ===
Fowles played for Spartak Moscow in Russia during the 2008–09 and 2009-10 WNBA off-seasons. Fowles played for Galatasaray Medical Park of Turkey for three off-seasons from 2010 to 2013. In the 2013–14 and 2014-15 WNBA off-seasons, Fowles played in China for the Shanghai Swordfish. Fowles had spent the second portion of the 2014-15 WNBA off-season in Turkey playing for Canik Belediyesi. In the 2015-16 WNBA off-season, Fowles played once again in China for the Beijing Great Wall, leading the team to a championship As of August 2016, Fowles re-signed with Beijing for the 2016-17 off-season. Fowles would lead Beijing to its second consecutive championship of the Women's Chinese Basketball Association in 2017. In 2017, Fowles would once again re-sign with Beijing for the 2017-18 off-season.

== National team career ==
Fowles was a member of the team representing the US at the 2005 World University Games Team in Izmir, Turkey. In the game against China, she led her team in scoring with 23 points. In the semi-final against Russia, she led the team with 25 points, helping the team win 118–67. Fowles averaged 15.0 points per game, and 7.3 rebounds, both team highs, and helped the team to a 7–0 record, resulting in a gold medal at the event.

Fowles is a member of the United States women's national basketball team and she earned a gold medal at the 2008 Summer Olympics.

Fowles was again invited to the USA Basketball Women's National Team training camp in the fall of 2009. The team selected to play for the 2010 FIBA World Championship and the 2012 Olympics is usually chosen from these participants. At the conclusion of the training camp, the team traveled to Ekaterinburg, Russia, where they competed in the 2009 UMMC Ekaterinburg International Invitational.

Fowles was named as one of the National team members to represent the USA Basketball team in the WNBA versus USA Basketball. This game replaces the normal WNBA All-Star game with WNBA All-Stars versus USA Basketball, as part of the preparation for the FIBA World Championship for Women to be held in the Czech Republic during September and October 2010.

In 2010, Fowles was named to the national team which competed in the World Championships in Ostrava, and Karlovy Vary, Czech Republic. The team won all nine games to win the gold medal. They held all opponents to no more than 75 points, while scoring in triple digits four times. The win against Australia by eight points was the only game with a single digit margin of victory. Fowles averaged 8.9 points per game over the course of the tournament.

Fowles was one of 21 finalists for the U.S. Women's Olympic Basketball Team Roster. The 20 professional women's basketball players, plus one collegiate player (Brittney Griner), were selected by the USA Basketball Women's National Team Player Selection Committee to compete for the final roster which would represent the US at the 2012 Summer Olympics in London, where the USA victory brought Fowles her second Olympic gold medal.

Fowles also played with Team USA for the 2016 Summer Olympics in Rio, and won her third gold medal as USA beat Spain 101–72.

On June 21, 2021, Fowles was named to her fourth Olympic roster for Team USA for the 2020 Summer Olympics. She and Team USA went on to win the gold medal in the tournament (Fowles' fourth gold), defeating Japan 90–75 in the final.

== Coaching career ==
On December 22, 2025, Fowles was announced as an Assistant Coach of the Portland Fire.

== Personal life ==
In 2015, Fowles enrolled in a mortuary science program at the American Academy McAllister Institute, where she has online studies in embalming, cremation, and funeral directing. In 2025, she began working on completing her remaining credits and then taking her board exams. She plans to open her own funeral home somewhere in the Pacific Northwest. Interested in the field since the death of her grandmother when she was a child, and holding funerals for her stuffed animals, she wants to present the deceased in an attractive way so that loved ones can say goodbye. Her hobby has been knitting since she was 6. She also loves bicycling. She gave some of her 2017 MVP bonus to a Saint Paul nonprofit to provide bikes for girls and also led a local bike ride. She also led local bike rides in connection with her final WNBA season, and the Lynx gave fans a commemorative bike license plate at her final regular season home game.

Fowles founded the Sylvia Fowles Family Fund in 2010 to help needy children. She is a spokesperson for the Citizens United for Research in Epilepsy (CURE) and has two nephews who have epilepsy.

== Career statistics ==
=== WNBA ===
Legend
GP	Games played	GS	Games started	MPG	Minutes per game	RPG	Rebounds per game
APG	Assists per game	SPG	Steals per game	BPG	Blocks per game	PPG	Points per game
TO	Turnovers per game	FG%	Field-goal percentage	3P%	3-point field-goal percentage	FT%	Free-throw percentage
**Bold**	Career best	°	League leader

†	Denotes seasons in which Fowles won a WNBA championship
‡	WNBA record

==== Regular season ====
Year	Team	GP	GS	MPG	FG%	3P%	FT%	RPG	APG	SPG	BPG	TO	PPG
2008	Chicago	17	14	25.0	.520	.000	.585	7.5	0.3	1.1	2.1	2.2	10.5
2009	Chicago	24	20	28.8	.599°	.000	.646	7.8	0.8	0.9	1.5	3.2	11.3
2010	Chicago	**34**	**34**	32.0	.582	**1.000**	.760	9.9	1.5	1.2	**2.6**°	2.4	17.8
2011	Chicago	**34**	**34**	**34.6**°	.591°	.000	.766	10.2	0.6	1.2	2.0°	2.8	**20.0**
2012	Chicago	25	25	31.1	.638°	.000	.692	10.4	0.8	1.3	1.2	2.1	16.2
2013	Chicago	32	32	31.3	.586°	.000	.685	11.5°	0.4	0.9	2.4	2.1	16.3
2014	Chicago	20	18	29.8	.546	.000	.783	10.2	0.6	**1.4**	2.0	2.8	13.4
2015^{†}	Minnesota	18	18	28.9	.507	.000	.734	8.3	0.8	1.0	1.5	1.7	15.3
2016	Minnesota	**34**	**34**	28.5	.595	.000	.717	8.5	1.2	1.3	1.7	1.8	13.9
2017^{†}	Minnesota	**34**	**34**	30.8	**.655**°	.000	.768	10.4	1.5	1.2	1.9	2.4	18.9
2018	Minnesota	**34**	**34**	31.9	.619°	.000	.757	**11.9**	**2.2**	**1.4**	1.2	3.0	17.7
2019	Minnesota	**34**	**34**	29.5	.588°	.000	.707	8.9	1.5	0.9	1.3	2.0	13.6
2020	Minnesota	7	7	24.1	.609	.000	**.828**	9.7	0.9	0.9	1.1	**1.1**	14.6
2021	Minnesota	31	31	30.1	.640	.000	.755	10.1	1.4	1.8	1.8	2.3	16.0
2022	Minnesota	30	30	27.7	.622	.000	.660	9.8	1.2	1.0	1.2	2.1	14.4
Career	15 years, 2 teams	408	399	30.2	.599‡	1.000	.728	9.8	1.1	1.2	1.8	2.4	15.7

==== Postseason ====
Year	Team	GP	GS	MPG	FG%	3P%	FT%	RPG	APG	SPG	BPG	TO	PPG
2013	Chicago	2	2	35.5	.462	.000	.545	12.0°	0.5	**2.0**	**2.0**	4.0	15.0
2014	Chicago	9	9	36.2	.538	.000	.773	9.7	0.2	1.7	1.6	2.1	16.2
2015^{†}	Minnesota	**10**	**10**	30.9	.622	.000	.750	9.7	1.2	0.9	1.6	2.5	12.6
2016	Minnesota	8	8	31.4	.611	.000	.750	9.8	1.3	0.8	1.7	1.5	12.9
2017^{†}	Minnesota	8	8	35.4	.631	.000	.559	**13.1**	1.5	1.6	**2.0**	2.9	**18.6**
2018	Minnesota	1	1	**37.8**	.636	.000	'**1.000**	12.0	**3.0**	0.0	1.0	5.0	18.0
2019	Minnesota	1	1	23.5	.538	.000	.000	11.0	0.0	0.0	**2.0**	3.0	14.0
2020	Minnesota	1	1	18.0	.250	.000	**1.000**	4.0	1.0	0.0	0.0	**1.0**	6.0
2021	Minnesota	1	1	32.0	**.667**	.000	.833	8.0	2.0	1.0	**2.0**	**1.0**	17.0
Career	9 years, 2 teams	41	41	33.0	.584	.000	.712	10.4	1.0	1.2	1.7	2.4	14.9

=== College ===
Legend
GP	Games played	GS	Games started	MPG	Minutes per game
FG%	Field goal percentage	3P%	3-point field goal percentage	FT%	Free throw percentage
RPG	Rebounds per game	APG	Assists per game	SPG	Steals per game
BPG	Blocks per game	PPG	Points per game	**Bold**	Career high

Year	Team	GP	Points	FG%	3P%	FT%	RPG	APG	SPG	BPG	PPG
2004–05	LSU	36	426	.576	–	.592	9.0	0.3	1.4	2.8	11.8
2005–06	LSU	35	557	**.607**	–	.583	11.6	0.3	**1.9**	**2.1**	15.9
2006–07	LSU	**38**	**643**	.571	–	.612	**12.6**	0.4	1.2	**2.1**	16.9
2007–08	LSU	35	608	.584	–	**.616**	10.3	**0.6**	1.5	2.0	**17.4**
Career		144	2,234	.584	–	.601	10.9	0.4	1.5	2.2	15.5

== Awards and honors ==
- 2005 SEC Sixth Woman of the Year
- 2005 Second-team All-SEC
- 2005 SEC All-Freshman
- 2005 Honorable Mention All-America (AP)
- 2005 & 2006 First-team All-Louisiana
- 2005 Louisiana Freshman of the Year
- 2006 First-team All-SEC
- 2006 Third-team All-American (AP)
- 2007 SEC All-Tournament Team
- 2007 First-team All-American (ESPN.com, Wooden Award, USBWA)
- 2007 Second-team All-American (AP)
- 2007 Kodak All-America
- 2007 First-team All-SEC
- 2007 Fresno Regional MOP
- Member of the 2007 United States Senior National Team in Italy
- Member of the 2006 United States Senior National Team in Australia
- Member of the 2005 United States World University Games Gold Medal Team
- 2008 WBCA NCAA Division I Defensive Player of the Year
- 2008 SEC Player of the Year
- 2009 WNBA All-Star Selection
- 2010 WNBA All-Star Selection
- 2010 WNBA All-Star Game Most Valuable Player Award
- EuroLeague Women 2010–11 All-Star MVP Award
- 2011 WNBA Defensive Player of the Year
- 2013 WNBA Defensive Player of the Year
- 2016 WNBA Defensive Player of the Year
- 2021: The W25 (top 25 WNBA players of all time)
- 2025: Inductee to the Women's Basketball Hall of Fame

== See also ==
- WNBA records
- List of WNBA career blocks leaders
- List of WNBA career rebounding leaders

Awards and achievements
Preceded by Tina Charles	WNBA Peak Performer (Rebounding); 2013 season	Succeeded by Incumbent
