= 1989 NCAA Division I women's basketball championship game =

Women's basketball championship game

NCAA Division I women's basketball championship game
National championship game
Auburn Tigers	Tennessee Lady Volunteers
(32–1)	(34–2)
60	76
Head coach: Joe Ciampi	Head coach: Pat Summitt
- AP: 2
- Coaches: 2
- AP: 1
- Coaches: 1
	1st half	2nd half	Total
Auburn Tigers	27	33	60
Tennessee Lady Volunteers	35	41	76
- Date: April 2, 1989
- Venue: Tacoma Dome, Tacoma, Washington
- MVP: Bridgette Gordon, Tennessee

United States TV coverage
- Network: CBS
- Announcers: Tim Brant (play-by-play) and Mimi Griffin (analyst)

The 1989 NCAA Division I women's basketball championship game was the final game of the 1989 NCAA Division I women's basketball tournament. It determined the champion of the 1988–89 NCAA Division I women's basketball season and was contested by the Auburn Tigers and the Tennessee Lady Volunteers. The game was played on April 2, 1989, at the Tacoma Dome in Tacoma, Washington. It was the first time an NCAA women's championship game featured two teams from the same conference. After leading 35–27 at halftime, No. 1 Tennessee controlled the game throughout and defeated No. 2 Auburn 76–60 to capture the program's second NCAA national championship. Bridgette Gordon was named the tournament's Most Outstanding Player.

== Participants ==
=== Auburn Tigers ===
The Tigers, who represented the Auburn University in Auburn, Alabama, were led by head coach Joe Ciampi in his 9th season at the school. Auburn began the season ranked No. 3 in the AP Poll. After spending the first 14 polls at either No. 3 or No. 2, the Tigers peaked at No. 1 for two of the final three weeks before finishing the regular season back at No. 3 in both major polls.

Playing as the No. 1 seed in the Mideast region of the NCAA tournament, the Lady Tigers defeated Temple, No. 17 Clemson, and No. 9 Ole Miss to reach their second straight Final Four. In the National semifinals, Auburn avenged their loss in the prior season's National championship game by defeating No. 3 Louisiana Tech, 76–71. The 32–1 Tigers entered the matchup with No. 1 Tennessee as the slight underdog.

=== Tennessee Lady Volunteers ===
The Lady Volunteers, who represented the University of Tennessee in Knoxville, Tennessee, were led by head coach Pat Summitt, in her 15th season at the school. After losing to eventual champion Louisiana Tech in the Final Four the prior season, Tennessee opened this season ranked No. 1 in the AP poll and spent the entirety of the season inside the top 3. After losing at Auburn during the regular season, Tennessee avenged the loss in the SEC championship game. They finished the regular season right back where they started – ranked No. 1 in both major polls.

In the NCAA tournament, Tennessee easily defeated La Salle, No. 15 Virginia, and No. 7 Long Beach State to reach the sixth NCAA Final Four in program history. They won 77–65 over No. 5 Maryland in the national semifinal to reach the all-SEC national championship game with a 34–2 record.

== Starting lineups ==
Auburn	Position	Tennessee
Carolyn Jones	G	Dena Head
Ruthie Bolton	G	Melissa McCray
Vickie Orr	C	Sheila Frost
Jocelyn McGilberry	F	Bridgette Gordon
Patrena Scruggs	F	Carla McGhee

== Game summary ==
CBS

April 2, 1989

No. 2 Auburn Tigers 60, No. 1 Tennessee Lady Volunteers 76
Scoring by half: 27–35, 33–41
Pts: Rebs: Asts:	Pts: Rebs: Asts:

Tacoma Dome – Tacoma, Washington

Bridgette Gordon led all scorers with 27 points and also recorded 11 rebounds for Tennessee. Auburn had defeated Tennessee during the regular season, but Tennessee won their second meeting in the Southeastern Conference tournament before the teams met again in the national championship game. The championship game was attended by 9,758 spectators at the Tacoma Dome.

== Media coverage ==
The game was broadcast on CBS.
