= 1988–89 Clemson Tigers women's basketball team =

Women's college basketball season

1988–89 Clemson Tigers women's basketball

NCAA Tournament, Sweet Sixteen
- Conference: Atlantic Coast Conference

Ranking
- Coaches: No. 13
- Record: 20–11 (9–5 ACC)
- Head coach: Jim Davis (2nd season)
- Home arena: Littlejohn Coliseum

1988–89 ACC women's basketball standings
	Conf.				Overall
Team	W		L	PCT	W		L	PCT
No. 5 Maryland †	13	–	1	.929	29	–	3	.906
No. 13 NC State	12	–	2	.857	24	–	7	.774
Clemson	9	–	5	.643	20	–	11	.645
Virginia	8	–	6	.571	21	–	10	.677
Wake Forest	6	–	8	.429	16	–	12	.571
Georgia Tech	5	–	9	.357	14	–	14	.500
Duke	2	–	12	.143	12	–	16	.429
North Carolina	1	–	13	.071	10	–	20	.333
† 1989 ACC tournament winner Rankings from AP poll

The 1988–89 Clemson Tigers women's basketball team represented Clemson University during the 1988–89 NCAA Division I women's basketball season. The Tigers were led by second year head coach Jim Davis. The Tigers, members of the Atlantic Coast Conference, played their home games at Littlejohn Coliseum.

== Schedule ==
Date time, TV	Rank^{#}	Opponent^{#}	Result	Record	Site city, state
November 26, 1988*		vs. No. 19 LSU; Bowling Green Invitational	W 69–66	1–0	E. A. Diddle Arena; Bowling Green, Kentucky
November 27, 1988*		at No. 14 Western Kentucky; Bowling Green Invitational	L 54–55	1–1	E. A. Diddle Arena; Bowling Green, Kentucky
December 2, 1988*		vs. Florida; Middle Tennessee Invitational	W 63–47	2–1	Murphy Center; Murfreesboro, Tennessee
December 3, 1988*		at Middle Tennessee; Middle Tennessee Invitational	L 64–69	2–2	Murphy Center; Murfreesboro, Tennessee
December 10, 1988*		Morehead State	W 73–52	3–2	Littlejohn Coliseum; Clemson, South Carolina
December 17, 1988*		at Radford	W 63–57	4–2	Dedmon Center; Radford, Virginia
December 29, 1988*		vs. UNC Wilmington; St. Peter's Tournament	W 88–51	5–2	Yanitelli Center; Jersey City, New Jersey
December 30, 1988*		at St. Peter's; St. Peter's Tournament	W 67–63	6–2	Yanitelli Center; Jersey City, New Jersey
January 2, 1989		No. 20 Duke	W 69–55	7–2 (1–0)	Littlejohn Coliseum; Clemson, South Carolina
January 4, 1989		No. 19 NC State	L 76–78	7–3 (1–1)	Littlejohn Coliseum; Clemson, South Carolina
January 6, 1989		No. 5 Maryland	W 69–67	8–3 (2–1)	Littlejohn Coliseum; Clemson, South Carolina
January 11, 1989	No. 20	No. 12 Virginia	L 63–64	8–4 (2–2)	Littlejohn Coliseum; Clemson, South Carolina
January 14, 1989	No. 20	Wake Forest	L 76–82	8–5 (2–3)	Littlejohn Coliseum; Clemson, South Carolina
January 16, 1989*		at No. 6 Georgia	L 75–96	8–6 (2–3)	Stegeman Coliseum; Athens, Georgia
January 18, 1989		Georgia Tech	W 83–56	9–6 (3–3)	Littlejohn Coliseum; Clemson, South Carolina
January 21, 1989		at No. 16 NC State	L 71–81	9–7 (3–4)	Reynolds Coliseum; Raleigh, North Carolina
January 26, 1989*		at No. 16 South Carolina rivalry	L 62–64	9–8 (3–4)	Carolina Coliseum; Columbia, South Carolina
January 28, 1989*		No. 16 South Carolina rivalry	W 74–67	10–8 (3–4)	Littlejohn Coliseum; Clemson, South Carolina
February 1, 1989*		Georgia Southern	W 75–41	11–8 (3–4)	Littlejohn Coliseum; Clemson, South Carolina
February 8, 1989		at Duke	W 71–50	12–8 (4–4)	Cameron Indoor Stadium; Durham, North Carolina
February 11, 1989		at North Carolina	W 71–66	13–8 (5–4)	Carmichael Arena; Chapel Hill, North Carolina
February 15, 1989		at Wake Forest	W 72–61	14–8 (6–4)	Winston-Salem War Memorial Coliseum; Winston-Salem, North Carolina
February 18, 1989		at No. 14 Virginia	W 93–84	15–8 (7–4)	University Hall; Charlottesville, Virginia
February 20, 1989		at No. 6 Maryland	L 63–88	15–9 (7–5)	Cole Field House; College Park, Maryland
February 22, 1989		at Georgia Tech	W 89–62	16–9 (8–5)	Alexander Memorial Coliseum; Atlanta, Georgia
February 25, 1989		North Carolina	W 92–61	17–9 (9–5)	Littlejohn Coliseum; Clemson, South Carolina
February 27, 1989*		DePaul	W 89–78	18–9 (9–5)	Littlejohn Coliseum; Clemson, South Carolina
ACC Tournament
March 4, 1989*		vs. Georgia Tech; ACC Tournament quarterfinal	W 94–74	19–9 (9–5)	Civic Center; Fayetteville, North Carolina
March 5, 1989*		vs. No. 14 NC State; ACC Tournament semifinal	L 86–93	19–10 (9–5)	Civic Center; Fayetteville, North Carolina
NCAA Tournament
March 18, 1989*		No. 10 Georgia; NCAA Tournament second round	W 78–65	20–10 (9–5)	Littlejohn Coliseum; Clemson, South Carolina
March 23, 1989*		at No. 2 Auburn; NCAA Tournament regional semifinal	L 60–71	20–11 (9–5)	Beard–Eaves–Memorial Coliseum; Auburn, Alabama
*Non-conference game. ^{#}Rankings from AP Poll. (#) Tournament seedings in parentheses.
