= 1988–89 Tennessee Lady Volunteers basketball team =

Intercollegiate basketball season

1988–89 Tennessee Lady Volunteers basketball

NCAA tournament National champions SEC Tournament champions
- Conference: Southeastern Conference

Ranking
- Coaches: No. 1
- AP: No. 1
- Record: 35–2 (8–1 SEC)
- Head coach: Pat Summitt (15th season)
- Assistant coaches: Mickie DeMoss; Holly Warlick
- Home arena: Thompson-Boling Arena

1988–89 SEC women's basketball standings
	Conf.				Overall
Team	W		L	PCT	W		L	PCT
No. 2 Auburn	9	–	0	1.000	32	–	2	.941
No. 1 Tennessee ^{†}	8	–	1	.889	35	–	2	.946
No. 10 Georgia	6	–	3	.667	23	–	7	.767
Vanderbilt	5	–	4	.556	21	–	8	.724
LSU	5	–	4	.556	19	–	11	.633
Ole Miss	4	–	5	.444	23	–	8	.742
Mississippi State	3	–	6	.333	12	–	16	.429
Kentucky	3	–	6	.333	12	–	16	.429
Florida	1	–	8	.111	15	–	14	.517
Alabama	1	–	8	.111	14	–	15	.483
† 1989 SEC tournament winner Rankings from AP poll

The 1988–89 Tennessee Lady Volunteers basketball team represented the University of Tennessee as a member of the Southeastern Conference during the 1988–89 women's college basketball season. Coached by Pat Summitt, the Lady Volunteers finished 35–2, ranked No. 1 in both major polls, and won their second of three national championships in a 5-year span. The Lady Vols started the season ranked No. 1 and never fell below the No. 3 ranking.

== Roster ==
1988–89 Tennessee Lady Volunteers women's basketball team
Players
Coaches

Pos.	#	Name	Height	Year	Previous school	Hometown
G	11	Dena Head	5 ft 10 in (1.78 m)	Fr	Salem	Canton, Michigan
F/C	24	Carla McGhee	6 ft 3 in (1.91 m)	Jr		Peoria, Illinois
F	30	Bridgette Gordon	6 ft 0 in (1.83 m)	Sr	DeLand	DeLand, Florida
C	32	Daedra Charles	6 ft 3 in (1.91 m)	So	Saint Martin de Porres	Detroit, Michigan
G	33	Tonya Edwards	5 ft 10 in (1.78 m)	Jr	Flint Northwestern	Flint, Michigan

Head coach

- Pat Summitt

Assistant coach(es)

- Mickie DeMoss
- Holly Warlick

Legend

- (C) Team captain
- (S) Suspended
- (I) Ineligible
- (W) Walk-on
- Injured
- Current redshirt

Roster

== Schedule and results ==
Date time, TV	Rank^{#}	Opponent^{#}	Result	Record	Site city, state
Regular season
Nov 27, 1988*	No. 1	vs. No. 6 Louisiana Tech; Hawaii Wahine Classic	W 76–74 ^{OT}	3–0	(450); Honolulu, Hawaii
Jan 6, 1989	No. 1	at No. 3 Auburn	L 59–67	11–1 (0–1)	Eaves Memorial Coliseum (7,150); Auburn, Alabama
Jan 31, 1989*	No. 2	at No. 11 Texas	L 67–69	18–2	Frank Erwin Center; Austin, Texas
SEC tournament
March 4, 1989*	(2) No. 2	vs. (10) Alabama; Quarterfinals	W 89–61	28–2	Albany Civic Center; Albany, Georgia
March 5, 1989*	(2) No. 2	vs. (3) No. 11 Ole Miss; Semifinals	W 82–60	29–2	Albany Civic Center; Albany, Georgia
March 6, 1989*	(2) No. 2	vs. (1) No. 1 Auburn; Championship game	W 66–51	30–2	Albany Civic Center; Albany, Georgia
NCAA tournament
March 18, 1989*	(1 E) No. 1	vs. (9 E) La Salle; Second round	W 91–61	31–2	Thompson–Boling Arena; Knoxville, Tennessee
March 23, 1989*	(1 E) No. 1	vs. (4 E) No. 15 Virginia; Regional Semifinal – Sweet Sixteen	W 80–47	32–2	E. A. Diddle Arena; Bowling Green, Kentucky
March 25, 1989*	(1 E) No. 1	vs. (2 E) No. 7 Long Beach State; Regional Final – Elite Eight	W 94–80	33–2	E. A. Diddle Arena; Bowling Green, Kentucky
March 31, 1989*	(1 E) No. 1	vs. (1 W) No. 5 Maryland; National Semifinal – Final Four	W 77–65	34–2	Tacoma Dome; Tacoma, Washington
April 2, 1989*	(1 E) No. 1	vs. (1 MW) No. 2 Auburn; National Championship	W 76–60	35–2	Tacoma Dome; Tacoma, Washington
*Non-conference game. ^{#}Rankings from AP Poll. (#) Tournament seedings in parentheses. ME=Mideast.

== Rankings ==
Ranking movements Legend: ██ Increase in ranking ██ Decrease in ranking
	Week																	
Poll	1	2	3	4	5	6	7	8	9	10	11	12	13	14	15	16	17	Final
AP	1	1	1	1	1	1	1	2	2	2	2	3	3	2	2	2	1	Not released
Coaches	1	1	1	1	1	1	1	2	2	2	2	3	3	2	2	1	1	1
