= 1988–89 Iowa Hawkeyes women's basketball team =

Intercollegiate basketball season

1988–89 Iowa Hawkeyes women's basketball

Big Ten Conference regular season co-champions

NCAA tournament, Sweet Sixteen
- Conference: Big Ten Conference

Ranking
- Coaches: No. 11
- AP: No. 8
- Record: 27–5 (16–2 Big Ten)
- Head coach: C. Vivian Stringer (6th season)
- Home arena: Carver–Hawkeye Arena

1988–89 Big Ten women's basketball standings
	Conf.				Overall
Team	W		L	PCT	W		L	PCT
No. 8 Iowa	16	–	2	.889	27	–	5	.844
No. 14 Ohio State	16	–	2	.889	24	–	6	.800
No. 15 Purdue	14	–	4	.778	24	–	6	.800
Indiana	9	–	9	.500	16	–	12	.571
Michigan State	9	–	9	.500	15	–	13	.536
Northwestern	6	–	12	.333	11	–	17	.393
Illinois	6	–	12	.333	11	–	18	.379
Wisconsin	5	–	13	.278	13	–	14	.481
Michigan	5	–	13	.278	11	–	17	.393
Minnesota	4	–	14	.222	7	–	21	.250
Rankings from AP Poll

The 1988–89 Iowa Hawkeyes women's basketball team represented the University of Iowa as members of the Big Ten Conference during the 1988–89 NCAA women's basketball season. The Hawkeyes, led by sixth-year head coach C. Vivian Stringer, played their home games in Iowa City, Iowa at Carver–Hawkeye Arena. They finished the season 27–5 overall, 16–2 in Big Ten play, sharing a piece of the conference championship in back-to-back-to-back seasons. Iowa advanced to the Sweet Sixteen of the women's NCAA basketball tournament – another accomplishment for the third straight season.

== Roster ==
1988–89 Iowa Hawkeyes women's basketball team
Players
Coaches

Pos.	#	Name	Height	Year	Previous school	Hometown
G	10	Stephanie Schueler	5 ft 6 in (1.68 m)	So	Lincoln	Sioux Falls, SD
F	14	Felicia Hall	6 ft 2 in (1.88 m)	So	Green Oaks	Shreveport, LA
G	21	Robin Christian	5 ft 9 in (1.75 m)	Sr	Jamaica Plain	Roxbury, MA
F	25	Franthea Price	5 ft 9 in (1.75 m)	Jr	River Rouge	River Rouge, MI
F	33	Jody Ratigan	5 ft 8 in (1.73 m)	Jr	Tri-Center	Neola, IA
G	34	Jolette Law	5 ft 3 in (1.6 m)	Jr	Wilson	Florence, SC
C	42	Shanda Berry	6 ft 3 in (1.91 m)	Sr	Oelwein	Oelwein, IA
F/C		Katie Abrahamson	6 ft 2 in (1.88 m)	Jr	Washington	Cedar Rapids, IA

Head coach

- C. Vivian Stringer

Assistant coach(es)

- Jennifer Bednarek
- Marianna Freeman

Legend

- (C) Team captain
- (S) Suspended
- (I) Ineligible
- (W) Walk-on
- Injured
- Current redshirt

Roster

== Schedule and results ==
Date time, TV	Rank^{#}	Opponent^{#}	Result	Record	Site city, state
Regular season
Nov 25, 1988*	No. 5	vs. Wyoming; Hawaii Wahine Classic	W 83–40	1–0	Honolulu, Hawaii
Nov 26, 1988*	No. 5	vs. No. 6 Louisiana Tech; Hawaii Wahine Classic	L 58–62	1–1	Honolulu, Hawaii
Nov 27, 1988*	No. 5	vs. No. 13 Washington; Hawaii Wahine Classic	W 53–51	2–1	Honolulu, Hawaii
Dec 2, 1988*	No. 7	vs. Grambling State; Kansas Dial Soap Classic	W 80–66	3–1	Allen Fieldhouse; Lawrence, Kansas
Dec 3, 1988*	No. 7	at Kansas; Kansas Dial Soap Classic	L 63–67	3–2	Allen Fieldhouse; Lawrence, Kansas
Dec 7, 1988*	No. 11	Iowa State	W 79–46	4–2	Carver-Hawkeye Arena; Iowa City, Iowa
Dec 10, 1988*	No. 11	Miami (OH); Amana-Hawkeye Classic	W 73–44	5–2	Carver-Hawkeye Arena; Iowa City, Iowa
Dec 11, 1988*	No. 11	Wake Forest; Amana-Hawkeye Classic	W 78–62	6–2	Carver-Hawkeye Arena; Iowa City, Iowa
Dec 22, 1988*	No. 7	Oregon State	W 90–45	7–2	Carver-Hawkeye Arena; Iowa City, Iowa
Dec 28, 1988*	No. 6	vs. Oklahoma; Burger King/Pepsi Classic	W 86–69	8–2	James L. Knight International Center; Miami, Florida
Dec 29, 1988*	No. 6	vs. Nebraska; Burger King/Pepsi Classic	W 84–67	9–2	James L. Knight International Center; Miami, Florida
Jan 6, 1989	No. 6	Michigan	W 82–42	10–2 (1–0)	Carver-Hawkeye Arena; Iowa City, Iowa
Jan 8, 1989	No. 6	Michigan State	W 89–49	11–2 (2–0)	Carver-Hawkeye Arena; Iowa City, Iowa
Jan 13, 1989	No. 5	at Illinois	W 82–64	12–2 (3–0)	Assembly Hall; Champaign, Illinois
Jan 15, 1989	No. 5	Ohio State	W 84–70	13–2 (4–0)	Carver-Hawkeye Arena; Iowa City, Iowa
Jan 18, 1988*	No. 5	at Drake	W 71–65	14–2	Veterans Memorial Auditorium; Des Moines, Iowa
Jan 21, 1989	No. 5	Minnesota	W 97–54	15–2 (5–0)	Carver-Hawkeye Arena; Iowa City, Iowa
Jan 27, 1989	No. 4	Indiana	W 77–61	16–2 (6–0)	Carver-Hawkeye Arena; Iowa City, Iowa
Jan 29, 1989	No. 4	at No. 11 Purdue	L 56–67	16–3 (6–1)	Mackey Arena; West Lafayette, Indiana
Feb 3, 1989	No. 7	at Wisconsin	W 67–57	17–3 (7–1)	Wisconsin Field House; Madison, Wisconsin
Feb 5, 1989	No. 7	at Northwestern	W 63–53	18–3 (8–1)	Welsh-Ryan Arena; Evanston, Illinois
Feb 10, 1989	No. 7	No. 10 Purdue	W 66–64	19–3 (9–1)	Carver-Hawkeye Arena; Iowa City, Iowa
Feb 12, 1989	No. 7	Illinois	W 82–50	20–3 (10–1)	Carver-Hawkeye Arena; Iowa City, Iowa
Feb 17, 1989	No. 7	at Minnesota	W 80–73	21–3 (11–1)	Williams Arena; Minneapolis, Minnesota
Feb 21, 1989	No. 7	at No. 20 Ohio State	L 57–66	21–4 (11–2)	St. John Arena; Columbus, Ohio
Feb 24, 1989	No. 7	at Indiana	W 70–63 ^{OT}	22–4 (12–2)	Assembly Hall; Bloomington, Indiana
Mar 3, 1989	No. 9	Northwestern	W 77–46	23–4 (13–2)	Carver-Hawkeye Arena; Iowa City, Iowa
Mar 5, 1989	No. 9	Wisconsin	W 78–52	24–4 (14–2)	Carver-Hawkeye Arena; Iowa City, Iowa
Mar 9, 1989	No. 8	at Michigan	W 79–61	25–4 (15–2)	Crisler Arena; Ann Arbor, Michigan
Mar 11, 1989	No. 8	at Michigan State	W 74–63	26–4 (16–2)	Jenison Fieldhouse; East Lansing, Michigan
NCAA tournament
Mar 18, 1989*	(3 MW) No. 8	(11 MW) Tennessee Tech; Second round	W 77–75	27–4	Carver-Hawkeye Arena; Iowa City, Iowa
Mar 23, 1989*	(3 MW) No. 8	vs. (2 MW) No. 4 Stanford; Midwest Regional Semifinal – Sweet Sixteen	L 74–98	27–5	Thomas Assembly Center; Ruston, Louisiana
*Non-conference game. ^{#}Rankings from AP Poll. (#) Tournament seedings in parentheses. MW=Midwest.
