= 1988–89 Auburn Tigers women's basketball team =

Intercollegiate basketball season

1988–89 Auburn Tigers women's basketball

SEC regular season champions Auburn Dial Classic champions

NCAA tournament, Runner-up
- Conference: Southeastern Conference

Ranking
- Coaches: No. 2
- AP: No. 2
- Record: 32–2 (9–0 SEC)
- Head coach: Joe Ciampi (10th season)
- Assistant coach: Carol Ross
- Home arena: Joel H. Eaves Memorial Coliseum

1988–89 SEC women's basketball standings
	Conf.				Overall
Team	W		L	PCT	W		L	PCT
No. 2 Auburn	9	–	0	1.000	32	–	2	.941
No. 1 Tennessee ^{†}	8	–	1	.889	35	–	2	.946
No. 10 Georgia	6	–	3	.667	23	–	7	.767
Vanderbilt	5	–	4	.556	21	–	8	.724
LSU	5	–	4	.556	19	–	11	.633
Ole Miss	4	–	5	.444	23	–	8	.742
Mississippi State	3	–	6	.333	12	–	16	.429
Kentucky	3	–	6	.333	12	–	16	.429
Florida	1	–	8	.111	15	–	14	.517
Alabama	1	–	8	.111	14	–	15	.483
† 1989 SEC tournament winner Rankings from AP poll

The 1988–89 Auburn Tigers women's basketball team represented Auburn University during the 1988–89 NCAA Division I women's basketball season. The Tigers, led by tenth-year head coach Joe Ciampi, played their home games at Joel H. Eaves Memorial Coliseum as members of the Southeastern Conference. They finished the season 32–2, 9–0 in SEC play to win the conference regular season title. Ranked No. 1, they lost to Tennessee in championship game of the SEC women's tournament. Auburn finished the regular season ranked No. 3 and was selected as the No. 1 seed in the Mideast regional of the NCAA tournament. They defeated Temple, Clemson, and Ole Miss to reach the second Final Four in program history. The Lady Tigers then defeated No. 1 seed in the Midwest region, Louisiana Tech, to avenge last season's loss and reach the National championship game once again. Auburn was defeated by longtime SEC foe Tennessee, 76–60.

This season marked the second of three straight National runner-up finishes for the Auburn women's basketball program.

== Roster ==
1988–89 Auburn Tigers women's basketball team
Players
Coaches

Pos.	#	Name	Height	Year	Previous school	Hometown
G	10	Chantel Tremitiere	5 ft 6 in (1.68 m)	So	William Penn	York, PA
G	21	Carolyn Jones	5 ft 9 in (1.75 m)	So	West Jones	Laurel, MS
G	25	Ruthie Bolton	5 ft 8 in (1.73 m)	Sr	McClain	McLain, MS
C	45	Linda Godby	6 ft 5 in (1.96 m)	Jr	Warren Central	Indianapolis, IN
C	50	Vickie Orr	6 ft 2 in (1.88 m)	Sr	Hartselle	Decatur, AL

Head coach

- Joe Ciampi (Mansfield State)

Assistant coach(es)

Legend

- (C) Team captain
- (S) Suspended
- (I) Ineligible
- (W) Walk-on
- Injured
- Current redshirt

Roster

== Schedule ==
Date time, TV	Rank^{#}	Opponent^{#}	Result	Record	Site (attendance) city, state
Regular season
Nov 26, 1988	No. 7	Tennessee State; Auburn Dial Classic	W 104–30	1–0	Eaves Memorial Coliseum; Auburn, Alabama
Nov 27, 1988	No. 7	No. 10 Maryland; Auburn Dial Classic	W 75–63	2–0	Eaves Memorial Coliseum; Auburn, Alabama
Nov 30, 1988	No. 5	Southern	W 96–63	3–0	Eaves Memorial Coliseum; Auburn, Alabama
January 6, 1989	No. 3	No. 1 Tennessee	W 67–59	13–0 (1–0)	Eaves Memorial Coliseum (7,150); Auburn, Alabama
SEC Tournament
March 4, 1989*	(1) No. 1	vs. (9) Florida; Quarterfinals	W 72–61	26–1	Albany Civic Center; Albany, Georgia
March 5, 1989*	(1) No. 1	vs. (4) LSU; Semifinals	W 75–65	27–1	Albany Civic Center; Albany, Georgia
March 6, 1989*	(1) No. 1	vs. (2) No. 2 Tennessee; Championship game	L 51–66	28–1	Albany Civic Center; Albany, Georgia
NCAA Tournament
March 18, 1989	(1 ME) No. 2	(8 ME) Temple; Second round	W 88–54	29–1	Eaves Memorial Coliseum; Auburn, Alabama
March 23, 1989	(1 ME) No. 2	(4 ME) Clemson; Regional Semifinal – Sweet Sixteen	W 71–60	30–1	Eaves Memorial Coliseum; Auburn, Alabama
March 25, 1989	(1 ME) No. 2	(3 ME) No. 12 Ole Miss; Regional Final – Elite Eight	W 77–51	31–1	Eaves Memorial Coliseum; Auburn, Alabama
March 31, 1989*	(1 ME) No. 2	vs. (1 MW) No. 3 Louisiana Tech; National Semifinal – Final Four	W 76–71	32–1	Tacoma Dome; Tacoma, Washington
April 2, 1989*	(1 ME) No. 2	vs. (1 E) No. 1 Tennessee; National Championship	L 60–76	32–2	Tacoma Dome; Tacoma, Washington
*Non-conference game. ^{#}Rankings from AP Poll. (#) Tournament seedings in parentheses. All times are in Central Time.

== Rankings ==
Ranking movements Legend: ██ Increase in ranking ██ Decrease in ranking
	Week																	
Poll	1	2	3	4	5	6	7	8	9	10	11	12	13	14	15	16	17	Final
AP	7	5	4	4	3	3	3	1	1	1	1	1	1	1	1	1	2	Not released
Coaches	7	7	4	4	3	3	3	1	1	1	1	1	1	1	1	2	2	2
