= 2006 SEC women's basketball tournament =

- Classification: Division I
- Teams: 12
- Site: Alltel Arena; Little Rock, Arkansas
- Champions: Tennessee Lady Vols (12th title)
- Winning coach: Pat Summitt (12th title)
- MVP: Candace Parker (Tennessee)
- Attendance: 37,033

2005–06 SEC women's basketball standings
	Conf.				Overall
Team	W		L	PCT	W		L	PCT
No. 5 LSU	13	–	1	.929	31	–	4	.886
No. 6 Tennessee^{†}	11	–	3	.786	31	–	5	.861
No. 12 Georgia	10	–	4	.714	23	–	9	.719
Kentucky	9	–	5	.643	22	–	9	.710
Florida	8	–	6	.571	21	–	9	.700
Vanderbilt	8	–	6	.571	21	–	11	.656
South Carolina	7	–	7	.500	17	–	12	.586
Ole Miss	5	–	9	.357	17	–	14	.548
Arkansas	5	–	9	.357	13	–	15	.464
Auburn	4	–	10	.286	14	–	15	.483
Alabama	3	–	11	.214	9	–	19	.321
Mississippi State	1	–	13	.071	6	–	22	.214
† 2006 SEC tournament winner Rankings from AP poll

The 2006 SEC women's basketball tournament took place March 2–5, 2006 in Little Rock, Arkansas at the Alltel Arena.

Tennessee Lady Vols won the tournament and received the SEC's automatic bid to the NCAA tournament by beating LSU on March 5, 2006 by the score of 63 to 62.

== Seeds ==
Seed	School	Conference record	Overall record	Tiebreaker
1	LSU^{‡†}	13-1	31-4	
2	Tennessee^{†}	11-3	31-5	
3	Georgia^{†}	10-4	23-9	
4	Kentucky^{†}	9-5	22-9	
5	Florida	8-6	21-9	
6	Vanderbilt	8-6	21-11	
7	South Carolina	7-7	17-12	
8	Ole Miss	5-9	17-14	
9	Arkansas	5-9	13-15	
10	Auburn	4-10	14-15	
11	Alabama	3-11	9-19	
12	Mississippi State	1-13	6-22	
‡ – SEC regular season champions, and tournament No. 1 seed. † – Received a single-bye in the conference tournament. Overall records include all games played in the SEC Tournament.

== Tournament ==
First round
8	Ole Miss	94
9	Arkansas	64
5	Florida	98
12	Mississippi State	83
6	Vanderbilt	84
11	Alabama	47
7	South Carolina	48
10	Auburn	64

Second round
8	Ole Miss	73
1	LSU	91
5	Florida	70
4	Kentucky	88
6	Vanderbilt
3	Georgia	69
10	Auburn
2	Tennessee	77

Semifinals
1	LSU	79
4	Kentucky	52
3	Georgia	79
2	Tennessee	89

Championship game
1	LSU	62
2	Tennessee	63

== All-Tournament team ==
- Sylvia Fowles, LSU (So.)
- Sherill Baker, Georgia (Sr.)
- Seimone Augustus, LSU (Sr.)
- Candace Parker, Tennessee (Fr.)-MVP
- Sidney Spencer, Tennessee (Jr.)

== See also ==
- 2006 SEC men's basketball tournament
