= 1989 SEC women's basketball tournament =

American college basketball postseason tournament

- Classification: Division I
- Teams: 12
- Site: Albany Civic Center; Albany, GA
- Champions: Tennessee (4th title)
- Winning coach: Pat Summit (4th title)
- MVP: Bridgette Gordon (Tennessee)
- Attendance: 18,935

The 1989 Southeastern Conference women's basketball tournament was the postseason women's basketball tournament for the Southeastern Conference (SEC) held at the Albany Civic Center in Albany, GA, from March 3 – March 6, 1989. The Tennessee Lady Vols won the tournament and earned an automatic bid to the 1989 NCAA Division I women's basketball tournament.

== Seeds ==
All teams in the conference participated in the tournament. Teams were seeded by their conference record.

Seed	School	Conf. Record	Overall record	Tiebreaker
1	Auburn^{‡†}	9–0	32–2	
2	Tennessee^{†}	8–1	35–2	
3	Georgia^{†}	6–3	23–7	
4	Vanderbilt^{†}	5–4	21–8	
5	LSU^{†}	5–4	19–11	
6	Ole Miss^{†}	4–5	23–8	
7	Mississippi State	3–6	12–16	
8	Kentucky	3–6	12–16	
9	Florida	1–8	15–14	
10	Alabama	1–8	14–15	
‡ – SEC regular season champions, and tournament No. 1 seed. † – Received a bye in the conference tournament. Overall records include all games played in the SEC Tournament.

== Schedule ==
Game	Matchup^{#}	Score
First Round – Fri, Mar 1
1	No. 7 Mississippi State vs. No. 10 Alabama	55–59
2	No. 8 Kentucky vs. No. 9 Florida	64–67
Quarterfinals – Sat, Mar 2
3	No. 1 Auburn vs. No. 9 Florida	72–61
5	No. 2 Tennessee vs. No. 10 Alabama	89–61
4	No. 3 Georgia vs. No. 6 Ole Miss	69–78
6	No. 4 Vanderbilt vs. No. 5 LSU	73–79
Semifinals – Sun, Mar 3
7	No. 1 Auburn vs. No. 5 LSU	75–65
8	No. 2 Tennessee vs. No. 6 Ole Miss	82–60
Finals – Mon, Mar 4
9	No. 1 Auburn vs. No. 2 Tennessee	51–66
# – Rankings denote tournament seed

== Bracket ==
First round Fri, Mar 1
8	Kentucky	64
9	Florida	67
7	Mississippi State	55
10	Alabama	59

Quarterfinals; Sat, Mar 2
1	Auburn	72
9	Florida	61
4	Vanderbilt	73
5	LSU	79
2	Tennessee	89
10	Alabama	61
3	Georgia	69
6	Ole Miss	78

Semifinals; Sun, Mar 3
1	Auburn	75
5	LSU	65
2	Tennessee	82
6	Ole Miss	60

Championship; Mon, Mar 4
1	Auburn	51
2	Tennessee	66
