= 1989 NAIA women's basketball tournament =

- Teams: 16
- Finals site: , Kansas City, Missouri
- Champions: Southern Nazarene Redskins (1st title, 1st title game, 1st Fab Four)
- Runner-up: Claflin Lady Panthers (2nd title game, 2nd Fab Four)
- Semifinalists: Arkansas Tech Golden Suns (3rd Fab Four); St. Ambrose Fighting Bees (1st Fab Four)
- Coach of the year: Bob Hoffman (Southern Nazarene)
- Charles Stevenson Hustle Award: Shelly Kay (Wayland Baptist)
- Chuck Taylor MVP: Miriam Walker-Samuels (Claflin)
- Top scorer: Miriam Walker-Samuels (Claflin) (162 points)

The 1989 NAIA women's basketball tournament was the ninth annual tournament held by the NAIA to determine the national champion of women's college basketball among its members in the United States and Canada.

Southern Nazarene defeated top-seeded Claflin in the championship game, 98–96, to claim the Redskins' first NAIA national title.

The tournament was played in Kansas City, Missouri.

== Qualification ==
The tournament field remained fixed at sixteen teams, with seeds assigned to the top eight teams.

The tournament utilized a simple single-elimination format. The national third-place game, for the two teams that lost in the semifinals, was eliminated for this tournament, reducing the number of games by one.

== Bracket ==
Round of 16
1	Claflin	114
Glenville State	59
Washburn	67
8	Central State (OH)	73
5	Wingate	65
Doane	68
St. Thomas Aquinas	75
4	St. Ambrose	111
3	Southern Nazarene	87
Tri-State	67
Western Washington	89
6	Minnesota Duluth	73
7	Wayland Baptist	81
Union (TN)	70
Fresno Pacific	40
2	Arkansas Tech	80

Quarterfinals
1	Claflin	91
8	Central State (OH)	85
Doane	69
4	St. Ambrose	90
3	Southern Nazarene	92
Western Washington	68
7	Wayland Baptist	66
2	Arkansas Tech	78

Semifinals
1	Claflin	90
4	St. Ambrose	89
3	Southern Nazarene	73
2	Arkansas Tech	57

National championship
1	Claflin	96
3	Southern Nazarene	98

== See also ==
- 1989 NCAA Division I women's basketball tournament
- 1989 NCAA Division II women's basketball tournament
- 1989 NCAA Division III women's basketball tournament
- 1989 NAIA men's basketball tournament
