= 1988–89 Louisiana Tech Lady Techsters basketball team =

1988-89 Louisiana Tech women's basketball season

1988–89 Louisiana Tech Lady Techsters basketball

American South champions

NCAA tournament, Final Four
- Conference: American South Conference

Ranking
- Coaches: No. 4
- AP: No. 3
- Record: 32–4 (10–0 American South Conference)
- Head coach: Leon Barmore (4th season)
- Assistant coaches: Kim Mulkey; Jennifer White
- Home arena: Thomas Assembly Center

1988–89 American South women's basketball standings
	Conf.				Overall
Team	W		L	PCT	W		L	PCT
No. 3 Louisiana Tech †	10	–	0	1.000	32	–	4	.889
New Orleans	7	–	3	.700	15	–	13	.536
Lamar	6	–	4	.600	18	–	10	.643
Arkansas State	5	–	5	.500	15	–	12	.556
Louisiana-Lafayette	2	–	8	.200	10	–	17	.370
Texas-Rio Grande Valley	0	–	10	.000	0	–	27	.000
† 1989 ASC Tournament winner Rankings from AP Poll

The 1988–89 Louisiana Tech Lady Techsters basketball team represented Louisiana Tech University during the 1988–89 NCAA Division I women's basketball season. The team was led by fourth–year head coach Leon Barmore, who led the team to a 32–4 record (10–0 American South), the NCAA tournament, and the program's third straight Final Four. The Lady Techsters played their home games at the Thomas Assembly Center in Ruston, Louisiana as a member of the American South Conference.

== Roster ==
1988–89 Louisiana Tech Lady Techsters women's basketball team
Players
Coaches

Pos.	#	Name	Height	Year	Hometown
G	3	Shelia Ethridge	5 ft 8 in (1.73 m)	Jr	Ruston, Louisiana
	4	Lisa Harvey	5 ft 7 in (1.7 m)	Sr	Benton Harbor, Michigan
	22	Phoebe Dunn	5 ft 8 in (1.73 m)	Jr	Abernathy, Texas
	23	Tatia Brown	5 ft 10 in (1.78 m)	Sr	Tulsa, Oklahoma
	30	Paulette Stall	5 ft 10 in (1.78 m)	Sr	La Crosse, Wisconsin
	40	Nora Lewis	6 ft 0 in (1.83 m)	Sr	Peoria, Illinois
C	43	Venus Lacy	6 ft 4 in (1.93 m)	Jr	Chattanooga, Tennessee
	50	Jocelyn Watson	6 ft 0 in (1.83 m)	Jr	McNeil, Arkansas

Head coach

- Leon Barmore

Assistant coach(es)

- Mary Kay Hungate
- Kim Mulkey
- Jennifer White

Legend

- (C) Team captain
- (S) Suspended
- (I) Ineligible
- (W) Walk-on
- Injured
- Current redshirt

== Schedule and results ==
Date time, TV	Rank^{#}	Opponent^{#}	Result	Record	Site (attendance) city, state
Regular season
Nov 26, 1988*	No. 6	vs. No. 5 Iowa; Hawaii Wahine Classic	W 62–58	2–0	(300); Honolulu, Hawaii
Nov 27, 1988*	No. 6	vs. No. 1 Tennessee; Hawaii Wahine Classic	L 74–76 ^{OT}	2–1	(450); Honolulu, Hawaii
Dec 10, 1988*	No. 3	No. 7 Virginia	W 88–66	7–1	Thomas Assembly Center (2,541); Ruston, Louisiana
Dec 13, 1988*	No. 3	No. 2 Georgia	W 72–55	8–1	Thomas Assembly Center (4,035); Ruston, Louisiana
American South tournament
NCAA tournament
March 19, 1989*	(1 MW) No. 3	(8 MW) Oklahoma State; Second round	W 103–78	30–3	Thomas Assembly Center (2,270); Ruston, Louisiana
March 23, 1989*	(1 MW) No. 3	(4 MW) LSU; Regional Semifinal – Sweet Sixteen	W 85–68	31–3	Thomas Assembly Center (4,982); Ruston, Louisiana
March 25, 1989*	(1 MW) No. 3	(2 MW) No. 6 Stanford; Regional Final – Elite Eight	W 85–75	32–3	Thomas Assembly Center (5,118); Ruston, Louisiana
March 31, 1989*	(1 MW) No. 3	vs. (1 ME) No. 2 Auburn; National Semifinal – Final Four	L 71–76	32–4	Tacoma Dome (9,030); Tacoma, Washington
*Non-conference game. ^{#}Rankings from AP Poll. (#) Tournament seedings in parentheses. All times are in Central.

== Rankings ==
Ranking movements Legend: ██ Increase in ranking ██ Decrease in ranking
	Week																	
Poll	1	2	3	4	5	6	7	8	9	10	11	12	13	14	15	16	17	Final
AP	6	4	3	3	2	2	2	4	3	3	3	2	2	3	3	3	3	Not released
Coaches	6	6	3	3	2	2	2	4	3	3	3	2	2	3	3	3	3	4
