= 1989 NCAA Division III women's basketball tournament =

- Teams: 32
- Finals site: , Danville, Kentucky
- Champions: Elizabethtown Blue Jays (2nd title)
- Runner-up: Stanislaus State Warriors (1st title game)
- Third place: Centre Colonels (1st Final Four)
- Fourth place: Clarkson Golden Knights (1st Final Four)
- Winning coach: Yvonne Kauffman (2nd title)

The 1989 NCAA Division III women's basketball tournament was the eighth annual tournament hosted by the NCAA to determine the national champion of Division III women's collegiate basketball in the United States.

Elizabethtown defeated Stanislaus State in the championship game, 66–56, to claim the Blue Jays' second Division III national title.

The championship rounds were hosted by Centre College in Danville, Kentucky.

== Bracket ==
- An asterisk by a team indicates the host of first and second round games
- An asterisk by a score indicates an overtime period

=== Regionals ===
First Round
Carnegie Mellon	61
Elizabethtown	78
DeSales	74
Franklin & Marshall	58

Regional Championship
Elizabethtown	91
DeSales	58
Regional Third-place
Carnegie Mellon	73*
Franklin & Marshall	67

First Round
Montclair State	69
Muskingum	88
Kean	72
Ohio Northern	85

Regional Championship
Muskingum	93
Ohio Northern	78
Regional Third-place
Montclair State	59
Kean	54

First Round
St. Norbert	74
Wisconsin–River Falls	93
Alma	63
Wisconsin–Eau Claire	68

Regional Championship
Wisconsin–River Falls	73
Wisconsin–Eau Claire	83
Regional Third-place
St. Norbert	69
Alma	79

First Round
Maryville (TN)	63
Nazareth	71
Centre (KY)	70
Virginia Wesleyan	61

Regional Championship
Nazareth	62
Centre (KY)	81
Regional Third-place
Maryville (TN)	86
Virginia Wesleyan	79

First Round
Clark (MA)	70
Salem State	40
Southern Maine	71
Western Connecticut State	46

Regional Championship
Clark (MA)	51
Southern Maine	47
Regional Third-place
Salem State	57
Western Connecticut State	58

First Round
Clarkson	81
St. John Fisher	64
NYU	72
Stony Brook	60

Regional Championship
Clarkson	77
NYU	66
Regional Third-place
St. John Fisher	76
Stony Brook	83

First Round
Augustana (IL)	93
Wartburg	74
Luther	77
Millikin	63

Regional Championship
Augustana (IL)	59
Luther	82
Regional Third-place
Wartburg	97
Millikin	75

First Round
Saint Thomas (MN)	68
Stanislaus State	82
Concordia Moorhead	80
St. Benedict	58

Regional Championship
Stanislaus State	80
Concordia Moorhead	74
Regional Third-place
St. Thomas (MN)	64
St. Benedict	56

=== National finals ===
Elite Eight
Elizabethtown	72
Muskingum	67
Centre (KY)	82
Wisconsin–Eau Claire	62
Clarkson	72
Clark (MA)	58
Stanislaus State	70
Luther	62

Final Four
Elizabethtown	73*
Centre (KY)	64
Clarkson	74
Stanislaus State	89

National championship
Elizabethtown	66
Stanislaus State	65
National third place
Centre (KY)	106
Clarkson	78

== All-tournament team ==
- Nancy Keene, Elizabethtown
- Kirsten Dumford, Stanislaus State
- Lisa Minturn, Stanislaus State
- Amy Huestis, Clarkson
- Susan Yates, Centre

== See also ==
- 1989 NCAA Division III men's basketball tournament
- 1989 NCAA Division I women's basketball tournament
- 1989 NCAA Division II women's basketball tournament
- 1989 NAIA women's basketball tournament
