= 1989 NAIA men's basketball tournament =

College basketball tournament

- Teams: 32
- Finals site: Kemper Arena; Kansas City, Missouri
- Champions: St. Mary's (TX) (1 title, 1 title game, 3 Fab Four)
- Runner-up: East Central (2 title game, 2 Fab Four)
- Semifinalists: Central Washington (5 Final Four); Wisconsin Eau Claire (3 Final Four)
- Charles Stevenson Hustle Award: Dave Foose (Wheeling Jesuit (WV))
- Chuck Taylor MVP: Vernell Kemp (East Central)

The 1989 NAIA men's basketball tournament was held in March at Kemper Arena in Kansas City, Missouri. The 52nd annual NAIA basketball tournament featured 32 teams playing in a single-elimination format. In the final, St. Mary's (TX) won 61–58 against East Central to clinch the championship.

== Awards and honors ==
- Leading scorers:
- Leading rebounder:
- Player of the Year: est. 1994.

== 1989 NAIA bracket ==
First round	Second round
1	Grand Canyon (Ariz.)	65
-	Western Montana	79
-	Western Montana	63'
16	College of Idaho	68
16	College of Idaho	61
-	Biola (California)	58
TOP TIER
9	Cumberland (Ky.)	68
-	Taylor (Ind.)	50
9	Cumberland (KY)	40
8	St. Mary's (TX)	56
8	St. Mary's (Tex.)	77
-	William Carey (Miss.)	53
5	Wheeling Jesuit (W.Virginia)	82
-	Guilford (N.C.)	74
5	Wheeling Jesuit	99
12	Drury (MO)	72
12	Drury (Mo.)	94
-	Waynesburg (Pa.)	74
TOP TIER
13	Central Washington	86
-	Georgia College	79
13	Central Washington	66
4	Charleston	55
4	College of Charleston (S.C.)	79'
-	Olivet Nazarene (Ill.)	64
3	Wayland Baptist (Tex.)	76
-	Holy Family (Pa.)	52
3	Wayland Baptist	68
14	East Central	83
14	East Central State (Okla.)	66
-	Brigham Young-Hawaii	55
BOTTOM TIER
11	Southern Arkansas	70
-	Siena Heights (Mich.)	83
-	Siena Heights	78
-	St. Ambrose	75
-	St. Ambrose (Iowa)	89
6	Husson (Maine)	88
7	Auburn-Montgomery (Ala.)	105
-	St. Rose (N.Y.)	97
7	Auburn Montgomery	63
10	Hastings	73
10	Hastings (Neb.)	89
-	Belmont (Tenn.)	76
BOTTOM TIER
15	Washburn (Kan.)	59
-	Minnesota-Duluth	55
15	Washburn	71
2	Wisconsin Eau Claire	86
2	Wisconsin-Eau Claire	81
-	Tiffin (Ohio)	59

Elite Eight
16	College of Idaho	68
8	St. Mary's (TX)	81
5	Wheeling Jesuit	78
13	Central Washington	87
11	East Central	77
14	Siena Heights	67
10	Hastings	73
2	Wisconsin Eau Claire	88

NAIA national semifinals
8	St. Mary's (TX)	68
13	Central Washington	58
11	East Central	58
2	Wisconsin Eau Claire	56

NAIA national championship
8	St. Mary's (TX)	61
11	East Central	58

- * denotes overtime.

== See also ==
- 1989 NCAA Division I men's basketball tournament
- 1989 NCAA Division II men's basketball tournament
- 1989 NCAA Division III men's basketball tournament
- 1989 NAIA women's basketball tournament
