= Mickie DeMoss =

American basketball coach (born 1955)

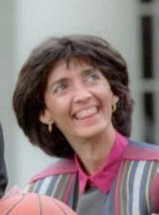
- DeMoss at the White House

Biographical details
- Born: October 3, 1955 (age 71); Delhi, Louisiana, U.S.

Playing career
- 1974–1977: Louisiana Tech
- Position: Point guard

Coaching career (HC unless noted)
- 1977–1979: Memphis State (asst.)
- 1979–1983: Florida
- 1983–1985: Auburn (asst.)
- 1985–2000: Tennessee (asst.)
- 2000–2003: Tennessee (assoc. HC)
- 2003–2007: Kentucky
- 2007–2010: Texas (asst.)
- 2010–2012: Tennessee (asst.)
- 2012–2014: Indiana Fever (asst.)
- 2014–2016: Louisiana Tech (assoc. HC/interim HC)
- 2016–2018: LSU (asst.)
- 2018–2019: Vanderbilt (offensive analyst)
- 2019–2022: Georgia Tech (chief of staff)

Head coaching record
- Overall: 116–123 (.485)

Accomplishments and honors

Championships
- NCAA championship (1987, 1989, 1991, 1996–1998); WNBA championship (2012)

Awards
- SEC Coach of the Year (2006)
- Women's Basketball Hall of Fame

Mickie Faye DeMoss (born October 3, 1955) is an American former college basketball coach and player. She was the women's head coach at the University of Florida and the University of Kentucky. She was also an assistant coach at Louisiana Tech University, University of Tennessee, University of Texas, Auburn University, Memphis State University, and the WNBA's Indiana Fever. DeMoss was inducted into the Women's Basketball Hall of Fame in 2018 as a Contributor - Assistant Coach. She retired after 45 years of coaching basketball in some capacity in July 2022, while chief of staff for Georgia Tech women's basketball.

== Early years ==
DeMoss was born in Delhi, Louisiana. After a standout high school career, she went to Louisiana Tech University, where she started at point guard for her final three years.

== Coaching career ==
=== Memphis State (1977–1979) ===
After graduation with a physical education degree in 1977, she began her coaching career as an assistant at Memphis State (now Memphis).

=== Florida (1979–1983) ===
In 1979, she became the first full-time women's basketball coach in the history of the University of Florida. After four seasons and a 45–68 record, she left to become an assistant at Auburn University under Joe Ciampi.

=== Auburn (1983–1985) ===
In both of her seasons at Auburn, they made the NCAA Tournament. More importantly for the direction of her career, she established herself as a top-notch recruiter. In the four seasons (1985–1989) after she left Auburn, players she helped recruit gave the Lady Tigers a 119–13 record and went to two Final Fours.

=== Tennessee (1985–2003, first stint) ===
In 1985, DeMoss was hired by Pat Summitt to be her top assistant at the University of Tennessee. During her 18 seasons in Knoxville, the Lady Vols went to 13 Final Fours and won six NCAA Women's Division I Basketball Championships. As at other coaching stops, she played a key role as a recruiter, this time as the official recruiting coordinator.

=== Kentucky (2003–2007) ===
DeMoss returned to the head coaching ranks in 2003, taking on the job at the University of Kentucky. The Wildcats had fallen off considerably from their glory years of the early 1980s, when the then-LadyKats were regularly competing for Southeastern Conference (SEC) honors. In the two years before DeMoss came to Lexington, the Wildcats had won a total of 20 games. The Wildcats had averaged little over 1,000 in per-game attendance.

DeMoss's first priority at Kentucky was recruiting; her first team was widely considered that year to be among the top 10 in the nation. Season ticket sales increased to over 3,000, and the Wildcats led the nation in increased attendance that season, averaging nearly 5,200. Despite an 11–16 record in 2003–04, the team showed marked improvement, reducing their average margin of defeat in SEC play by nearly 9 points.

The following season the Wildcats went 18–16, achieving their first winning season since 1999–00. They made a strong run in the 2005 Women's National Invitation Tournament, losing to West Virginia in the semifinals in double overtime.

DeMoss's breakthrough season with Kentucky proved to be her third year in the 2005–06 season. She entered with one of the youngest team roster in women's college basketball: one senior supported by nine freshmen and sophomores. The team set a new program record of nine conference wins, including a landmark 66–63 win over then top-ranked Tennessee at Rupp Arena on January 26, 2006; the program placed its highest conference rank since the 1980s at fourth. This enabled the team to return to national ranking since their last time in 1993. The Wildcats returned to the NCAA Tournament having waited seven years; they won in the first round against Chattanooga before losing in the next round to Michigan State. After the season, DeMoss was named SEC Coach of the Year by both her fellow coaches and the Associated Press. Her record at Kentucky at the end of the season was 51–42.

The Wildcats, returning all five starters, were ranked 15th in the 2006–07 AP preseason poll, the first preseason ranking for Kentucky in the history of the AP women's poll.

On April 11, 2007, DeMoss held a press conference to announce her resignation, abruptly stating "After 30 years of coaching, I just want to step back and reassess what I want to do for the rest of my life.".

=== Texas (2007–2010) ===
Four months after leaving her head coaching position at Kentucky, she returned to coaching by taking the assistant position at Texas. DeMoss spent 3 seasons (2007–2010) as a University of Texas assistant coach under head coach Gail Goestenkors.

=== Tennessee (2010–2012, second stint) ===
In May 2010, it was announced that DeMoss was returning to Tennessee as an assistant coach under Pat Summitt.

=== Indiana Fever (2012–2014) ===
On April 2, 2012, DeMoss announced she would leave the University of Tennessee and become an assistant coach for the WNBA's Indiana Fever.

=== Louisiana Tech (2014–2016) ===
On April 2, 2014, it was announced that DeMoss was named associate head coach to new head coach Tyler Summitt at her alma mater, Louisiana Tech. In April 2016, Summitt resigned following his admission of an inappropriate relationship. DeMoss was named as interim head coach for the remainder of the 2015–16 season.

=== LSU (2016–2018) ===
After leaving Louisiana Tech, DeMoss would serve as an assistant coach at LSU from 2016 through 2018.

=== Vanderbilt (2018–2019) ===
In 2018, DeMoss became an offensive analyst at Vanderbilt, a position she held until 2019.

=== Georgia Tech (2019–2022) ===
DeMoss last served as chief of staff at Georgia Tech from 2019 through 2022.

== Hall of Fame ==
DeMoss was inducted in the Women's Basketball Hall of Fame in 2018.

== Head coaching record ==
Record table
Season	Team	Overall	Conference	Standing	Postseason
Florida Gators (Southeastern Conference) (1979–1983)
1979–80	Florida	10–19	2–8		
1980–81	Florida	11–17	0–8		
1981–82	Florida	13–16	1–8		
1982–83	Florida	11–16	1–7		
Florida:		45–68	4–31		
Kentucky Wildcats (Southeastern Conference) (2003–2007)
2003–04	Kentucky	11–16	3–11		
2004–05	Kentucky	18–16	4–10		WNIT Semifinals
2005–06	Kentucky	22–9	9–5		NCAA Second Round
2006–07	Kentucky	20–14	6–8		WNIT Third Round
Kentucky:		71–55	22–34		
Total:		116–123			
National champion Postseason invitational champion Conference regular season champion Conference regular season and conference tournament champion Division regular season champion Division regular season and conference tournament champion Conference tournament champion
