= Pat Summitt =

American basketball player and coach (1952–2016)

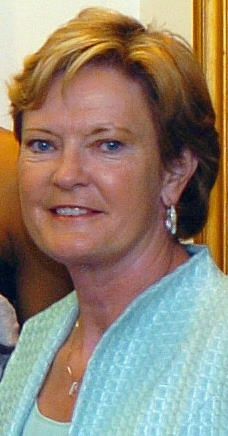
- Summitt at The Pentagon in 2008

Biographical details
- Born: June 14, 1952; Clarksville, Tennessee, U.S.
- Died: June 28, 2016 (aged 64); Knoxville, Tennessee, U.S.

Playing career
- 1970–1974: Tennessee–Martin

Coaching career (HC unless noted)
- 1974–2012: Tennessee

Head coaching record
- Overall: 1,098–208 (.841)

Accomplishments and honors

Championships
- 8 NCAA Division I tournament (1987, 1989, 1991, 1996–1998, 2007, 2008); 18 NCAA Division I regional – Final Four (1982, 1984, 1986–1989, 1991, 1995–1998, 2000, 2002–2005, 2007, 2008); 16 SEC tournament (1980, 1985, 1988, 1989, 1992, 1994, 1996, 1998–2000, 2005, 2006, 2008, 2010–2012); 16 SEC regular season (1980, 1985, 1990, 1993–1995, 1998, 1999–2004, 2007, 2010, 2011)

Awards
- Presidential Medal of Freedom (2012) Sports Illustrated Sportswoman of the Year (2011) John R. Wooden Legends of Coaching Award (2008) Naismith Coach of the 20th Century (2000) 5× Naismith Coach of the Year (1987, 1989, 1994, 1998, 2004) 3× WBCA Coach of the Year (1983, 1995, 1998) AP Coach of the Year (1998) USBWA Coach of the Year (1998) 8× SEC Coach of the Year (1993, 1995, 1998, 2001, 2003, 2004, 2007, 2011) Best Coach/Manager ESPY Award (2008) NCAA Gerald R. Ford Award (2012) USBWA Most Courageous Award (2012)
- Basketball Hall of Fame; Inducted in 2000 (profile)
- Women's Basketball Hall of Fame
- FIBA Hall of Fame as player
Medal record
Representing United States
World University Games
Silver medal – second place	1973 Moscow	Team competition
Pan American Games
Gold medal – first place	1975 Mexico	Player
Olympic Games
Silver medal – second place	1976 Montreal	Player
Women's basketball
Head coach for United States
William Jones Cup
Gold medal – first place	1984 Taipei	Team competition
Olympic Games
Gold medal – first place	1984 Los Angeles	Team competition
FIBA World Championship for Women
Silver medal – second place	1983 Sao Paulo	Team competition
FIBA World Championship for Women
Gold medal – first place	1979 Seoul	Team competition
William Jones Cup
Gold medal – first place	1979 Taipei	Team competition
Pan American Games
Silver medal – second place	1979 San Juan	Team competition

Patricia Sue Summitt (née Head; June 14, 1952 – June 28, 2016) was an American women's college basketball head coach and college basketball player. She coached 1,098 career wins, the most in college basketball history at the time of her retirement. She served as the head coach of the University of Tennessee Lady Vols basketball team from 1974 to 2012 and is considered one of the greatest basketball coaches of all time.

Summitt won a silver medal at the 1976 Summer Olympics in Montreal as a member of the United States women's national basketball team. She returned to the Olympics in 1984 as a head coach, guiding the U.S. women's basketball team to a gold medal. Summitt won eight NCAA Division I basketball championships. In 38 years as coach of the Tennessee Lady Volunteers, she never missed the NCAA Tournament nor did she ever have a losing season. Summitt retired from coaching at age 59 following a diagnosis of early-onset Alzheimer's disease.

Summitt was inducted into the Women's Basketball Hall of Fame in 1999 as a member of its inaugural class. She was named the Naismith Basketball Coach of the Century in 2000. In 2009, the Sporting News placed her at number 11 on its list of the 50 Greatest Coaches of All Time in all sports; she was the only woman on the list. In 2012, Summitt was awarded the Presidential Medal of Freedom by President Barack Obama and received the Arthur Ashe Courage Award at the 2012 ESPY Awards. In 2013, she was inducted into the FIBA Hall of Fame.

== Early life and family ==
Summitt was born Patricia Sue Head on June 14, 1952, in Clarksville, Tennessee, to Richard and Hazel Albright Head. In her early years, she was known as Trish. She had four siblings: older brothers Tommy, Charles, and Kenneth, and a younger sister, Linda. Summitt grew up on a dairy farm and began playing basketball when she was six years old, on a hoop her father had installed in a barn.

When Summitt was in high school, her family moved to nearby Henrietta so she could play basketball in Cheatham County, because Clarksville did not have a girls team. From there, Summitt went to the University of Tennessee at Martin, where she won All-American honors playing for UT Martin's first women's basketball coach, Nadine Gearin. In 1970, with the passage of Title IX still two years away, there were no athletic scholarships for women. Each of Summitt's brothers had received athletic scholarships, but her parents paid her way to college. She later co-captained the United States women's national basketball team as a player at the inaugural women's tournament in the 1976 Summer Olympics, winning the silver medal. Eight years later in 1984, she coached the U.S. women's team to an Olympic gold medal, becoming the first U.S. Olympian to win a basketball medal and coach a medal-winning team.

== Coaching career ==
=== 1970s ===
Just before the 1974–75 season, with women's college basketball still in its infancy and not yet an NCAA-sanctioned sport, 22-year-old Summitt became a graduate assistant at the University of Tennessee, and was named head coach of the Lady Vols after the previous coach suddenly quit. Summitt earned $250 monthly and washed the players' uniforms – uniforms purchased the previous year with proceeds from a doughnut sale. Summitt recalled that era of women's basketball during a February 2009 interview with Time. "I had to drive the van when I first started coaching," Summitt said. "One time, for a road game, we actually slept in the other team's gym the night before. We had mats, we had our little sleeping bags. When I was a player at the University of Tennessee at Martin, we played at Tennessee Tech for three straight games, and we didn't wash our uniforms. We only had one set. We played because we loved the game. We didn't think anything about it."

During Summitt's first year as head coach, four of her players were only a year younger than she was and all were from Tennessee high schools, which until 1980 employed a six-person game where offensive and defensive players never crossed mid-court. She coached her first game for Tennessee on December 7, 1974, against Mercer University in Macon, Georgia; the Lady Vols lost 84–83. Her first win came almost a month later when the Lady Vols defeated Middle Tennessee State, 69–32 on January 10, 1975. The Lady Vols won the Tennessee College Women's Sports Federation (TCWSF) Eastern District Championship for the third straight year. However, the team finished 4th overall in the TCWSF (they had been second the previous two years), and were not invited to the Association for Intercollegiate Athletics for Women (AIAW) tournament.

In her second season, Summitt coached the Lady Vols to a 16–11 record while earning her 1976 master's degree in physical education and training as the co-captain of the 1976 U.S. Women's Olympic basketball team that won a silver medal in Montreal. Starting with the 1976–77 season, Summitt directed two 20-win teams, winning back-to-back AIAW Region II championships. The Lady Vols defeated 3-time AIAW champion Delta State by 20 points in 1978, and earned Tennessee its first number one ranking. 1978 saw the Lady Vols participate in their first AIAW Final Four, where they finished third. Summitt also recorded her 100th win during this season, a 79–66 victory over NC State. Tennessee closed the 1970s by winning the first-ever SEC tournament, and returning to the AIAW Final Four, where they finished runner-up to Old Dominion, 68–53.

=== 1980s ===
During the 1980–81 season, the Lady Vols went 25–6, and avenged their championship game loss to Old Dominion by defeating them three times. The team made it to the AIAW Final Four for the third straight year; finished runner-up for the second consecutive year, losing to Louisiana Tech, 79–59.

The 1981–82 season featured the first ever NCAA women's basketball tournament. The Lady Vols were one of 32 teams invited and named a 2 seed in the Mideast region. In the region championship, the Lady Vols upset top-seeded USC 91–90 in overtime to advance to the Final Four. They lost their Final Four match-up with Louisiana Tech 69–46, which went on to win the tournament.

The next season, the Lady Vols won the regular season SEC title but fell in the SEC tournament to Georgia. Tennessee was invited to the now-36 team NCAA tournament and awarded its first-ever 1 seed. Tennessee made it to the regional championship, but fell to Georgia again, 67–63. Summitt won her 200th game on December 3, a 69–56 victory over St. John's during the Coca-Cola Classic in Detroit.

The 1983–84 season saw Tennessee start out 6–4. However, Summitt rallied her team and finished 22–10, for her eighth straight 20-win season. Tennessee earned the #3 seed in the Mideast region. Tennessee not only made it to the NCAA Final Four for the second time in the first three tournaments, but also made it to the title game. However, Tennessee lost by 11 to USC, which also had won the title the previous year. Summit earned Coach of the Year honors. The 1983–84 season was followed up by another 20-win year in which Tennessee earned both the regular season SEC title (despite only going 4–4) and the tournament title. However, the Lady Vols fell in the NCAA tournament to Ole Miss 63–60 during the round of 16. The next season was a similar story – the Lady Vols had a good regular season, played a great tournament (reaching the Final Four for the second time in three years), but fell 83–59 to USC before winning the title.

In 1986–87, Tennessee broke through and defeated perennial power Louisiana Tech 67–44 to win the Lady Vols' first national title. Tennessee's Tonya Edwards was named the Most Outstanding Player in the Final Four. During the regular season, Summitt also earned her 300th win, an 87–66 victory over North Carolina. The next year in 1987–88, the Lady Vols were positioned to repeat as the #1 seed in the East region, as Tennessee made it to the Final Four yet again. However, Louisiana Tech avenged the previous year's championship game loss with a 9-point victory and went on to win the title.

In 1988–89, the Lady Vols reached the Final Four for the fourth straight year. After eliminating Maryland by 12 points, Tennessee faced SEC rival Auburn for the national title. Auburn had lost by two points to Louisiana Tech in the NCAA title game the previous year and had suffered its only loss in the SEC Championship game by 15 points to Tennessee. The championship game was similar as Tennessee took home its second title in three years with a 76–60 victory. It was Tennessee's best season yet; the Lady Vols won 35 games while losing only two regular season contests to Auburn and Texas. The Lady Vols won every NCAA tournament game by at least 12 points.

In 1989–90, the Lady Vols started off the season well, winning the SEC title. However, the team fell by 1 point to Auburn in the SEC Championship Game and lost in overtime to Virginia in the regional finals, one game shy of making a trip to the Final Four, which that year was held in Knoxville. Summitt accomplished another milestone that season with her 400th win, a 70–69 victory over South Carolina on January 25.

=== 1990s ===
Tennessee failed to win the SEC regular season or the tournament championship in 1990–91 (losing in the tournament final to LSU), but after a close win in the NCAA regional semifinals against Western Kentucky, the Lady Vols eliminated Auburn for the second time in three years. In the national semifinals, the Lady Vols beat Stanford, 68–60, to earn the chance to avenge the previous year's tournament loss against Virginia. Just as the previous year's game had gone into overtime, so did this one. Tennessee escaped with a 70–67 win and its third national title in five years. The next season in 1991–92, the Lady Vols did not make it to the regional championship, falling 75–70 to the same Western Kentucky team they had beaten in that round the previous year. In 1992–93, Tennessee defeated the defending champions Stanford twice and swept the SEC season for the first time. However, the Lady Vols were unable to win the SEC tournament title and fell 72–56 in the NCAA tournament to Iowa in the regional finals.

Early in the 1993–94 season, Summitt grabbed her 500th win, an 80–45 win over Ohio State on November 21. Tennessee went on to win the regular season and tournament SEC titles before falling 71–68 to Louisiana Tech in the regional semifinals. The next season marked Tennessee's return to the Final Four. Tennessee went undefeated in the SEC regular season for the third straight year, but failed to win the tournament title, losing the final to in-state rival Vanderbilt. The top-seeded Lady Vols breezed their way to a fifth national title game, with none of their first five tournament games being closer than 21 points. However, in the national championship game, the Lady Vols fell 70–64 to the undefeated UConn Huskies (UConn's second win vs. Tennessee that season), coached by Summit's rival, Geno Auriemma, in the first of twelve championships for UConn. During the off-season, Summitt recruited high school stand-out Chamique Holdsclaw.

In 1995–96, with freshman Holdsclaw and senior Michelle M. Marciniak, the Lady Vols won the SEC tournament and made a second straight Final Four trip. In the semifinals, the Lady Vols avenged the previous year's tournament loss to UConn by ousting Auriemma and the Huskies with a hard-fought five-point win in overtime. The championship game was not that close as Tennessee easily won its fourth title with an 83–65 win over conference rival Georgia.

The 1996–97 Lady Vols posted one of the worst records ever for a Summitt-coached team. In addition to losses to powerhouses such as Louisiana Tech (twice), Georgia, Stanford, Old Dominion, and Connecticut, Tennessee fell to teams such as Florida, against whom they had been previously undefeated, and LSU, which was two seasons removed from going 7-20 (and still several years away from making five consecutive Final Four appearances) and losing 102-68 to the Lady Vols on their home floor. Summitt earned her 600th win with a 15-point victory over Marquette on November 23, 1996. Summitt and the 1996–97 championship team were the subject of an HBO documentary titled A Cinderella Season: The Lady Vols Fight Back. The Lady Vols posted a 23–10 record heading into the NCAA tournament. However, Tennessee righted itself during the tournament, shocking previously undefeated Connecticut in the regional final before defeating Notre Dame and Old Dominion in the Final Four to win the team's second straight national championship.

In many aspects, the 1997–98 team was Summitt's best. With the top-ranked recruiting class as well as Chamique Holdsclaw, the Lady Vols ran the table to a 39–0 season while playing one of the top-ranked schedules in the country. Only three teams came within 10 points of beating the team, and the Lady Vols won a 93–75 victory over Louisiana Tech for their third straight national championship. After the championship game, opposing Louisiana Tech head coach Leon Balmore proclaimed the Tennessee team to be the "best ever", echoing a similar claim made by Old Dominion University Hall of Famer Nancy Lieberman.

Holdsclaw (who by then had won national championships every season she was with the Vols) predicted that the 1998–99 team would be the greatest ever. However, Tennessee didn't claim another national title or make it to the Final Four. Injuries to several players decimated the team and the Lady Vols ultimately fell to Duke in the regional finals. A landmark was set during this season however, as Holdsclaw, Tamika Catchings, and Semeka Randall became the first trio from one team to be named Kodak All-Americans.

The Lady Vols ended the decade with a third straight 30-win season, third straight SEC title, and third straight SEC Tournament title. Additionally, they defeated UConn in the regular season, 72–71, in UConn's only loss of the year. In the NCAA tournament, Tennessee breezed its way to the title game, winning all five games by at least 10 points. In the championship game the Lady Vols were beaten soundly by UConn, 71–52. This marked the fourth time in six years that either Tennessee or UConn had eliminated the other from the tournament. UConn's two wins in that period came in championship games, adding more intensity to the Summit-Auriemma rivalry. During the season, Summitt earned her 700th win, 85–62 at Wisconsin.

At the 2000 ESPY awards, the Lady Vols basketball team was named co-team of the decade, along with the Florida State Seminoles football team. Additionally, Summitt was named the Naismith Coach of the Century and Chamique Holdsclaw earned recognition as Naismith Women's Collegiate Player of the Century.

=== 2000s ===
In the 2000–01 season, the Lady Vols claimed another SEC title, winning all 14 SEC games. Additionally, they split the season series with the UConn Huskies and headed into the SEC tournament with a 28–1 record. However, the Lady Vols were upset by Vanderbilt in the semifinals and then lost in the Sweet Sixteen to Xavier, their worst finish since 1993–94. During the regular season, Summitt earned her 750th win in the second game against UConn, a 92–88 victory. The team also finished with its fourth straight 30-win season.

In the 2001–02 season, the Lady Vols won their fifth straight SEC championship, but fell again in the conference tournament, this time to LSU. In the NCAA tournament, Tennessee reached the Final Four again, with a 5-point win over Vanderbilt University. This trip to the Final Four marked Summitt's 13th appearance, which broke Coach John Wooden's record of 12, and earned her 788th win, which tied Summitt with Jody Conradt for the winningest coach in women's basketball history. However, the Lady Vols fell in the national semifinals to Connecticut, which wound up winning the championship and capping an undefeated season. This loss ended the season at 29–5, one win shy of extending Summitt's streak of 30-win seasons. Summitt did achieve more milestones during the season; a 106–66 win over USC marked Summitt's 200th win at home, a victory against Louisiana Tech was her 300th win against a ranked opponent and her 93–65 win over Arkansas was her 1,000th game as a coach, including international contests.

During the 2002–03 season, the Lady Vols compiled their sixth perfect SEC season and beat powerhouses Duke and Louisiana Tech, among others, during the regular season, but lost to Texas and UConn. In the NCAA tournament, the Lady Vols made it to the title game only to lose to the Huskies again 73–68. During the season, Summitt earned her 800th win, 76–57 over DePaul and was the fastest coach to reach this milestone.

The 2003–04 season was similar to the previous year. The Lady Vols defeated most of their regular season opponents, including Duke and Louisiana Tech, but dropped games to UConn and Texas. The Lady Vols again went 14–0 in the regular season against SEC competition, but again fell in the conference tournament. Tennessee won five games in the NCAA tournament only to lose 70–61 to Connecticut in the championship game for the second year in a row and third time in five years.

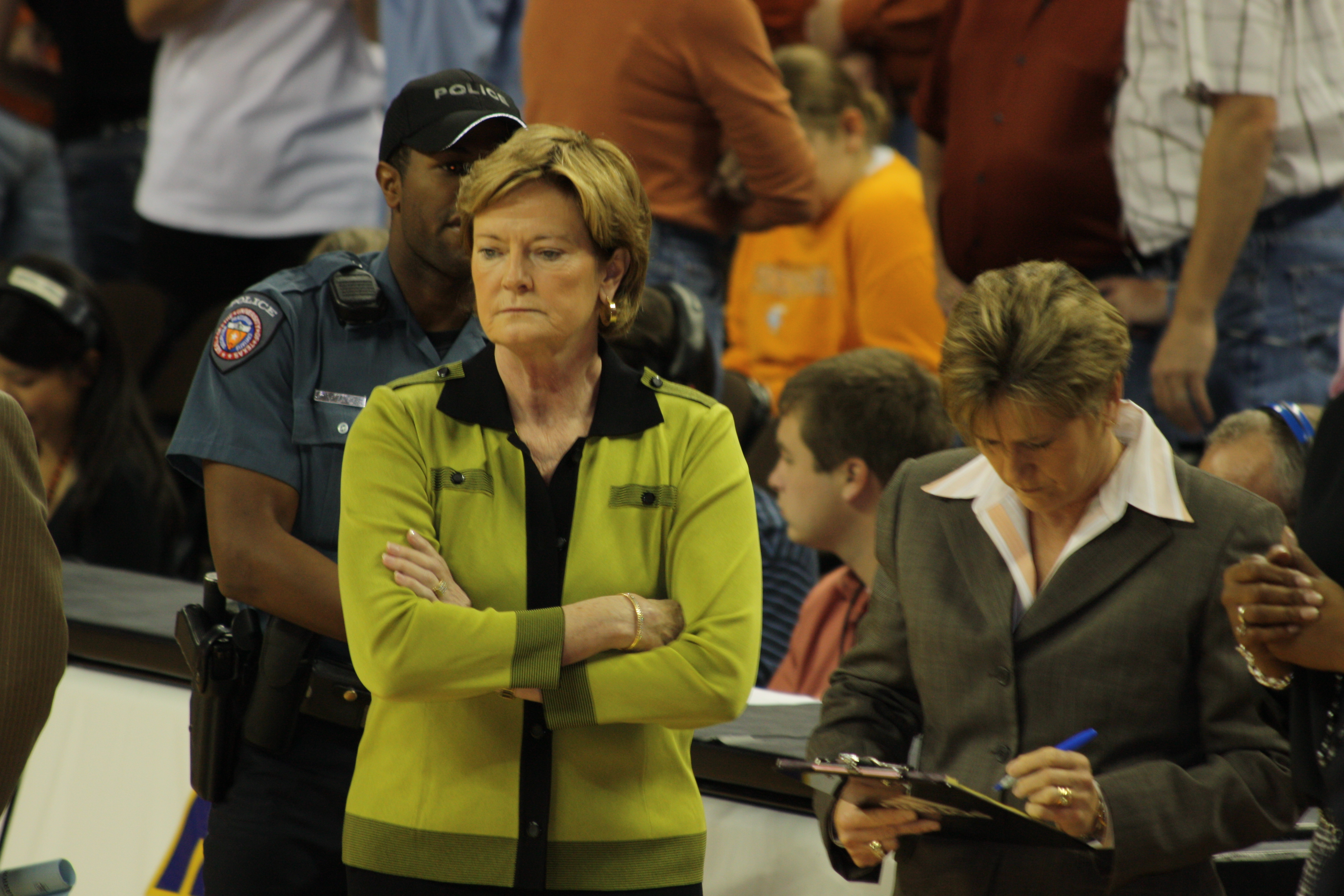
Summitt with a subdued look in 2008

In 2004–05, Tennessee broke its losing streak against Connecticut with a narrow 68–67 regular season victory. Candace Parker, a highly regarded and nationally known high school player joined the Lady Vols. However, because of injuries, she was redshirted and didn't play that season. Tennessee suffered losses during the regular season to Duke, Rutgers, and LSU, while beating Stanford and Louisiana Tech. LSU's win over Tennessee gave the Tigers the SEC title, breaking Tennessee's streak of seven straight regular season conference championships. However, Tennessee won its first tournament title in four years by avenging its earlier loss to LSU loss with a 67–65 win in the SEC Championship game. In the NCAA tournament, Tennessee advanced to its fourth Final Four in a row by defeating a Rutgers team that had beaten them earlier in the year. In the Final Four, the Lady Vols blew a 16-point lead to fall 68–64 to underdog Michigan State. In the second round of the NCAA tournament, the Lady Vols defeated Purdue. This victory gave Pat Summitt her 880th win, breaking North Carolina coach Dean Smith's record of 879 wins, and making her the all-time winningest coach in NCAA basketball history.

By 2005–06, Parker had recovered from her injuries and became a starter. During the season, the Lady Vols dropped three games to SEC foes, LSU, Florida, and Kentucky, to record their worst SEC season since the 1996–97 season. However, they won their second straight game against Connecticut and rebounded from a sub-par SEC season to win the conference tournament for the second year in a row. In the NCAA tournament, Tennessee received a number two seed instead of the one seed Summitt believed her team deserved, and played North Carolina in the regional finals. Tennessee trailed from the beginning, fell behind by as many as 16, rallied to cut the lead to five, but ultimately fell 75–63.

In the 2006–07 season, Tennessee defeated four ranked teams in a row: UCLA, Stanford, Arizona State, and Middle Tennessee, lost a regular season rematch with North Carolina and another game against top-ranked Duke, and defeated UConn for the third time in a row. Later, in Baton Rouge, the Lady Vols clinched the SEC title against LSU in a game where Candace Parker scored 27. However, in the SEC tournament semifinals, Tennessee fell to the Tigers. In the NCAA tournament, Summitt's team easily made it to the Final Four, dispatching teams that included SEC foe Mississippi and 13-seeded Cinderella, Marist, winning each game by at least 14. In the Final Four, Tennessee again faced North Carolina. Despite shooting poorly, the Lady Vols came back from a 12-point deficit with 8:18 remaining to win 56–50. In the championship game against Rutgers, Tennessee won its seventh title. During the season, Summitt appeared at a men's basketball game dressed in a cheerleader outfit and led the crowd in a rendition of "Rocky Top" to show her support for the team. A month earlier, her men's counterpart, Bruce Pearl, showed up at a Lady Vols game in orange body paint.

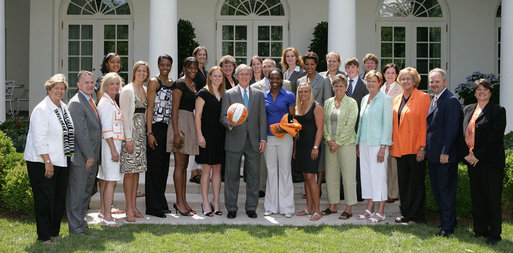
2007–2008 Lady Vols basketball team at the White House with President George W. Bush after they won their second consecutive national championship

The 2007–08 season started off with the top-ranked Lady Vols going 3–0, including wins over 9th-ranked Oklahoma and 22nd-ranked Texas. The win over Texas was Summitt's 950th. After two more wins, top-ranked Tennessee knocked off fourth-ranked North Carolina, 83–79, in a rematch of the previous year's Final Four match-up. Tennessee won their next four games, then headed to California for a match-up with 5th-ranked Stanford. Down by 4 with less than 30 seconds remaining, the Lady Vols managed to tie the game up and send it to overtime, but lost, 73–69. The Lady Vols responded by winning their next seven games, giving them a 17–1 record going into a match-up with Duke. Candace Parker's 17 points and 12 rebounds, including a bucket with 22 seconds remaining, helped the Lady Vols defeat the Blue Devils for the first time in four years, 67–64. Tennessee would win the rest of their regular season games and defeat LSU for the SEC tournament championship. The Lady Vols won four straight games in the NCAA Tournament heading toward their third matchup of the year against the LSU Lady Tigers in the Final Four. Alexis Hornbuckle tipped in a Nicky Anosike missed layup with 0.7 seconds left to win the game, 47–46. On April 8, 2008, Tennessee won its second consecutive national championship (and eighth overall) by beating Stanford 64–48.

Summitt's first milestone of the 2008–09 season was a 73–43 win over the Georgia Lady Bulldogs on February 5, 2009, at Thompson–Boling Arena in Knoxville. The win was the 1,000th for Coach Summitt. The Thompson–Boling Arena's court was named "The Summitt" in her honor. The 2008–09 season ended with a dubious first, as the Lady Vols lost 71–55 in the first round of the NCAA tournament to Ball State in Bowling Green, Kentucky, marking the first time Tennessee would not appear in the Sweet 16 since the NCAA first sanctioned championships in women's basketball for the 1981–82 season. The team finished with a 22–11 mark.

In the 2009–10 season, Summitt led the Lady Vols to a 32–3 season. The season saw the Lady Vols win the regular season SEC title and the SEC Tournament. The Lady Vols saw their season end in the Sweet 16 with a 77–62 loss to Baylor.

=== 2010s ===
In the 2010–11 season, Summitt lead the Lady Vols to a 34–3 record. The team were the SEC regular season champions and Conference Tournament champions. The Lady Vols saw their season end in a 73–59 loss to Notre Dame in the Elite Eight.

Summitt was diagnosed with early-onset Alzheimer's disease in 2011. Despite the diagnosis, she completed the 2011–2012 season in a reduced role, with Holly Warlick (an assistant under Summitt since 1985) assuming most of the coaching responsibilities. In an interview with GoVolsXtra.com, Summitt stated, "There's not going to be any pity party and I'll make sure of that." In December 2011, Summitt was honored as the Sports Illustrated sportswoman of the year.

As the 2011–12 season progressed, the team and the fans recognized that it was likely to be Summitt's last year coaching, and Ann Killion of Sports Illustrated called it "heart-wrenching to witness" when Warlick broke down in tears at the end of the regular season. In March, John Adams wrote in the Knoxville News Sentinel that it would be "too much to ask" of Summitt and her staff to go through another season, and David Climer wrote in The Tennessean that it was time for Summitt to retire.

On April 18, 2012, after the Lady Vols lost to the unbeaten eventual champion Baylor Lady Bears in the Elite Eight in Des Moines, Summitt stepped down as head coach, ending her 38-year coaching career at age 59. Warlick was named Summitt's successor. In a statement accompanying her resignation, Summitt said, "I feel like Holly's been doing the bulk of it. She deserves to be the head coach..." Summitt was given the title Head Coach Emeritus upon her resignation. According to NCAA regulations, as head coach emeritus, she was able to attend practices and assist Warlick in some duties, but was not allowed to sit on the team bench.

Summitt was presented the USBWA Most Courageous Award at the 2012 Final Four, and future awards were given in her name. She received the Arthur Ashe Courage Award in 2012, saying in her acceptance speech: "It is time to fight."

== USA Basketball involvement ==
=== Player ===
Summitt was named to the U.S. women's basketball team invited to compete at the 1975 Pan American Games. The team was coached by future Hall of Fame coach Cathy Rush. Players included Lusia Harris, Nancy Lieberman, Ann Meyers, and Juliene Simpson. After winning the gold medal in 1963, the USA team lost to Brazil in both 1967 and 1971 and had recently competed in the 1975 World Championship, finishing in eighth place. The opening game was against host-country Mexico which had finished ahead of the USA team at the World Championships. This time, the USA was victorious, beating Mexico 99–65. The USA would go on to win its next five games, all but one by a double-digit margin. That set up the gold medal game against Brazil which the USA team won convincingly, 74–55.

=== Coach ===
Summitt was named the head coach of the USA representative to the William Jones Cup competition in Taipei, Taiwan. The USA team had recently completed the World Championship, so was able to bypass the preliminary rounds. The team won all six contests and the gold medal. Four USA players were named to the 12 player all-tournament team.

Summitt was chosen as the head coach of the team representing the USA in 1984 at the William Jones Cup competition in Taipei, Taiwan. The team chosen to represent the USA was the team expected to be selected as the national team for the 1984 Olympic Games. This resulted in a very strong team which was able to dominate the competition. In the opening game against Australia, the USA won 82–20. While other games were closer, Italy's 23-point loss to the USA was the closest of the eight games. The USA won all eight games and the gold medal, and three of the team's players were named to the All-Tournament Team.

== Books ==
Summitt wrote three books, all with co-author Sally Jenkins: Reach for the Summitt, which is part motivational book and part biography; Raise the Roof, about the Lady Vols' 1997–1998 undefeated and NCAA-championship winning season; and Sum It Up, covering her life and her experience being diagnosed and living with Alzheimer's disease.

== Coaching style and legacy ==
Summitt was widely recognized as one of the toughest coaches in college basketball history. She was best known for giving her players an icy stare in response to poor play, known simply as "The Summitt Stare". However, she claimed that she mellowed considerably later in her career. In 2007, Summitt told U.S. News & World Report that she didn't yell at her players nearly as much as she had earlier in her career. On at least two occasions, Tennessee asked Summitt to consider coaching the men's team: once before 1997 and again in 2001.

Summitt won 16 Southeastern Conference regular season titles with the Lady Vols, as well as 16 tournament titles. Summitt's Lady Vols made an appearance in every NCAA Tournament from 1982 until her retirement, advanced to the Sweet 16 every year except 2009, and appeared 18 times in the Final Four. When Summitt made her 13th trip to the Final Four as a coach in 2002, she surpassed John Wooden as the NCAA coach with the most trips to the Final Four. Summitt was a seven-time SEC Coach of the Year and a seven-time NCAA Coach of the Year and won three consecutive national titles from 1996 to 1998. Summitt was known for scheduling tough opponents for her team to play in the regular season, in order to prepare them for the postseason. In her years of coaching, her teams played Top 10-ranked teams over 250 times.

Summitt finished her coaching career with 1,098 wins in 1,306 games coached in AIAW and NCAA Division I play. Summitt won eight NCAA Division I championships as a coach; as of June 2016, this is the third-highest total in the history of NCAA Division I men's and women's basketball.

Summitt received the Presidential Medal of Freedom from President Barack Obama in 2012. In 2013, an eight-foot bronze statue was erected in her honor on the University of Tennessee campus. A statue was dedicated to Summitt in her hometown of Clarksville, Tennessee, in 2018. The gymnasium at Cheatham County High School is named in her honor.

== Personal life ==
=== Family ===
Pat Summitt married Ross Barnes Summitt II in 1980. The couple had one son, Ross Tyler Summitt, born in 1990. Summitt filed for divorce from her husband in 2007.

Tyler Summitt, who played as a walk-on for the Tennessee men's basketball team, graduated from Tennessee in May 2012. He was hired as an assistant coach by the Marquette University women's team effective with the 2012–13 season. In what ESPN.com columnist Gene Wojciechowski called "a bittersweet irony", Tyler's hiring by Marquette was announced on the same day his mother announced her retirement.

=== Health ===
In August 2011, Summitt announced that she had been diagnosed three months earlier with early-onset Alzheimer's disease. She retired from coaching in 2012.

Summitt created a foundation to raise money for Alzheimer's research and worked to raise awareness of the disease.

=== Death ===
Summitt died on June 28, 2016, at the age of 64, at a senior living facility in Knoxville. She left the entirety of her estate to her son, Tyler.

After her death, the Pat Summitt Alzheimer's Clinic was opened at the University of Tennessee Medical Center, with funds from her Foundation. In 2017, the NCAA established the Pat Summitt Award to recognize individuals who positively influence college athletes.

== Accomplishments and records ==
- 1978—Inducted into Omicron Delta Kappa, the National Leadership Honor Society, as an Honoris Causa faculty/staff initiate
- 1983—Russell Athletic/WBCA National Coach of the Year
- 1990—Inducted into the International Women's Sports Hall of Fame as a coach, the first year coaches were honored.
- 1995—Russell Athletic/WBCA National Coach of the Year
- 1998—Russell Athletic/WBCA National Coach of the Year
- 1998—AP College Basketball Coach of the Year
- 1999—Inducted into the Women's Basketball Hall of Fame as a member of the inaugural class.
- 2000—Inducted into the Naismith Memorial Basketball Hall of Fame.
- 2000—Named the Naismith Basketball Coach of the Century.
- 2009—Named to Sporting News' list of the 50 greatest coaches of all time (MLB, NBA, NFL, NHL, college basketball, and college football). She is listed in position 11.
- 2011—Named Sports Illustrated's Sportswoman of the Year, December 6, 2011, in NYC. (She shared the Sportsman/Sportswoman honor with Duke University men's basketball head coach Mike Krzyzewski.)
- 2011—Inducted into the Tennessee Women's Hall of Fame.
- 2012—Awarded the Presidential Medal of Freedom by President Barack Obama.
- 2012—Arthur Ashe Courage Award Recipient at the ESPY Awards.
- 2012-Inducted into the University of Tennessee Athletics Hall of Fame
- 2013—Inducted into the FIBA Hall of Fame on June 19.
- 16-time SEC Champion (1980, 1985, 1990, 1993, 1994, 1995, 1998, 1999, 2000, 2001, 2002, 2003, 2004, 2007, 2010, 2011)
- 16-time SEC Tournament Champion (1980, 1985, 1988, 1989, 1992, 1994, 1996, 1998, 1999, 2000, 2005, 2006, 2008, 2010, 2011, 2012)
- 8-time SEC Coach of the Year (1983, 1995, 1998, 2001, 2003, 2004, 2007, 2011)
- 7-time NCAA Coach of the Year (1983, 1987, 1989, 1994, 1995, 1998, 2004)
- 8-time NCAA Champion (1987, 1989, 1991, 1996, 1997, 1998, 2007, 2008)
- Every Lady Vol player who completed her eligibility at Tennessee under Summitt graduated with a degree.
- Every Lady Vol player who completed her eligibility at Tennessee under Summitt played in at least one Elite Eight.

== Coaching tree ==
Forty-five of Summitt's former players have become coaches. This is a partial list of those players.

NOTE: This list does not include members of the United States team which Summitt coached to the gold medal at the 1984 Summer Olympics, most notably Kim Mulkey, who has won four national championships as head coach at Baylor (2005, 2012, 2019) and LSU (2023).

Name	Latest position	Latest school / organization	Relationship to Summitt	Years at Tennessee
Jody Adams	Head coach	New Mexico State	Player	1989–93
Jane Albright	Head coach	Nevada	Graduate assistant	1981–83
Greg Brown	Head coach	Lipscomb	Graduate assistant Assistant	2002–04
Niya Butts	Assoc. head coach	Kentucky	Player	1993–1997
Tasha Butts	Head coach	Georgetown	Player	2000–2004
Nikki Caldwell-Fargas	President	Las Vegas Aces (WNBA)	Player; Assistant	1990–94; 2003–08
Daedra Charles	Assistant coach	Tennessee	Player	1988–91
Abby Conklin	Assistant coach	University of San Francisco	Player	1993–97
Nancy Darsch	Assistant coach	Seattle Storm (WNBA)	Assistant	1978–85
Mickie DeMoss	Chief of Staff	Georgia Tech	Assistant; Assoc. Head Coach	1985–2003; 2010–12
Tonya Edwards	Assistant coach	Chicago Sky (WNBA)	Player	1986–90
Kyra Elzy	Assistant Coach	Duke	Player	1996–2001
Sharon Fanning-Otis	Head coach	Mississippi State	Graduate assistant	1975–76
Stephanie Glance	Head coach	Columbia	Assistant	2009–10
Bridgette Gordon	Head coach	Florida A&M	Player	1985–89
Tanya Haave	Head coach	Metropolitan State	Player	1980–84
Kellie Harper	Head coach	Missouri	Player	1995–99
Sylvia Hatchell	Head coach	North Carolina	Graduate assistant	1974–75
Lea Henry	Head coach	Georgia State	Player	1979–83
Gwen Jackson	Head coach	St. Paul's (VA)	Player	1999–2003
Angela Lawson	Senior Associate Director of Athletics	Incarnate Word	Graduate assistant	1989–91
Kara Lawson	Head coach	Duke University	Player	1999–03
Michelle Marciniak	Assistant coach	South Carolina	Player	1993–96
Nikki McCray-Penson	Assistant coach	Rutgers	Player	1991–95
Carla McGhee	Director Of Basketball Operations	Nevada Reno	Player	1986–90
Matthew Mitchell	Head coach	Kentucky	Graduate assistant	1999–2000
Carolyn Peck	Assoc. head coach	Vanderbilt	Assistant	1993–95
Shalon Pillow	Head coach	Florida A&M	Player	1998–2002
Semeka Randall	Head coach	Winthrop	Player	1997–2001
Jill Rankin	Head coach	Monterey High School Lubbock, TX	Player	1979–80
Trish Roberts	Head coach	Agnes Scott	Player	1976–77
Joy Scruggs	Head coach/Lecturer	Emory & Henry College	Player	1971–75
Tyler Summitt	Head coach	Louisiana Tech	Son; Practice squad player	2010–12
Heidi VanDerveer	Head coach	U.C. San Diego	Graduate assistant	1986–88
Holly Warlick	Head coach	Tennessee	Player; Assistant	1976–80; 1985–2012

- Bold in Latest position column indicates this is a currently-held position.

== Head coaching record ==
Record table
Season	Team	Overall	Conference	Standing	Postseason
Tennessee Lady Volunteers (AIAW) (1974–1979)
1974–75	Tennessee	16–8			TCWSF Eastern District Champions; 4th Place TCWSF
1975–76	Tennessee	16–11			4th Place TCWSF; 6th Place AIAW Region II
1976–77	Tennessee	28–5			2nd Place TCWSF; AIAW Region II Champions; 3rd Place AIAW
1977–78	Tennessee	27–4			2nd Place TCWSF; AIAW Region II Champions; 4th Place AIAW South Satellite
1978–79	Tennessee	30–9			TCWSF Champions; 2nd Place AIAW Region II; AIAW East Satellite Champions; 3rd Place AIAW
Tennessee Lady Volunteers (Southeastern Conference) (1979–2012)
1979–80	Tennessee	33–5			TCWSF Champions; 2nd Place AIAW Region II; AIAW South Satellite Champions; 2nd Place AIAW
1980–81	Tennessee	25–6			TCWSF Champions; AIAW Region II Champions; 2nd Place AIAW
1981–82	Tennessee	22–10			NCAA Final Four
1982–83	Tennessee	25–8	7–1	1st (East)	NCAA Elite Eight
1983–84	Tennessee	23–10	7–1	T–1st (East)	NCAA Runner-up
1984–85	Tennessee	22–10	4–4	T–2nd (East)	NCAA Sweet Sixteen
1985–86	Tennessee	24–10	5–4	5th	NCAA Final Four
1986–87	Tennessee	28–6	6–3	T–4th	NCAA champions
1987–88	Tennessee	31–3	8–1	2nd	NCAA Final Four
1988–89	Tennessee	35–2	8–1	2nd	NCAA champions
1989–90	Tennessee	27–6	8–1	1st	NCAA Elite Eight
1990–91	Tennessee	30–5	6–3	3rd	NCAA champions
1991–92	Tennessee	28–3	10–1	2nd	NCAA Sweet Sixteen
1992–93	Tennessee	29–3	11–0	1st	NCAA Elite Eight
1993–94	Tennessee	31–2	11–0	1st	NCAA Sweet Sixteen
1994–95	Tennessee	34–3	11–0	1st	NCAA Runner-up
1995–96	Tennessee	32–4	9–2	2nd	NCAA champions
1996–97	Tennessee	29–10	8–4	5th	NCAA champions
1997–98	Tennessee	39–0	14–0	1st	NCAA champions
1998–99	Tennessee	31–3	13–1	1st	NCAA Elite Eight
1999–00	Tennessee	33–4	13–1	T–1st	NCAA Runner-up
2000–01	Tennessee	31–3	14–0	1st	NCAA Sweet Sixteen
2001–02	Tennessee	29–5	13–1	1st	NCAA Final Four
2002–03	Tennessee	33–5	14–0	1st	NCAA Runner-up
2003–04	Tennessee	31–4	14–0	1st	NCAA Runner-up
2004–05	Tennessee	30–5	13–1	2nd	NCAA Final Four
2005–06	Tennessee	31–5	11–3	2nd	NCAA Elite Eight
2006–07	Tennessee	34–3	14–0	1st	NCAA champions
2007–08	Tennessee	36–2	13–1	2nd	NCAA champions
2008–09	Tennessee	22–11	9–5	5th	NCAA first round
2009–10	Tennessee	32–3	15–1	1st	NCAA Sweet Sixteen
2010–11	Tennessee	34–3	16–0	1st	NCAA Elite Eight
2011–12	Tennessee	27–9	12–4	2nd	NCAA Elite Eight
Tennessee:		1098–208 (.841)	306–44 (.874)		
Total:		1098–208 (.841)			
National champion Postseason invitational champion Conference regular season champion Conference regular season and conference tournament champion Division regular season champion Division regular season and conference tournament champion Conference tournament champion

Sources: SEC records; Conference champions

== See also ==
- List of college women's basketball career coaching wins leaders
