= Holly Warlick =

American basketball coach (born 1958)

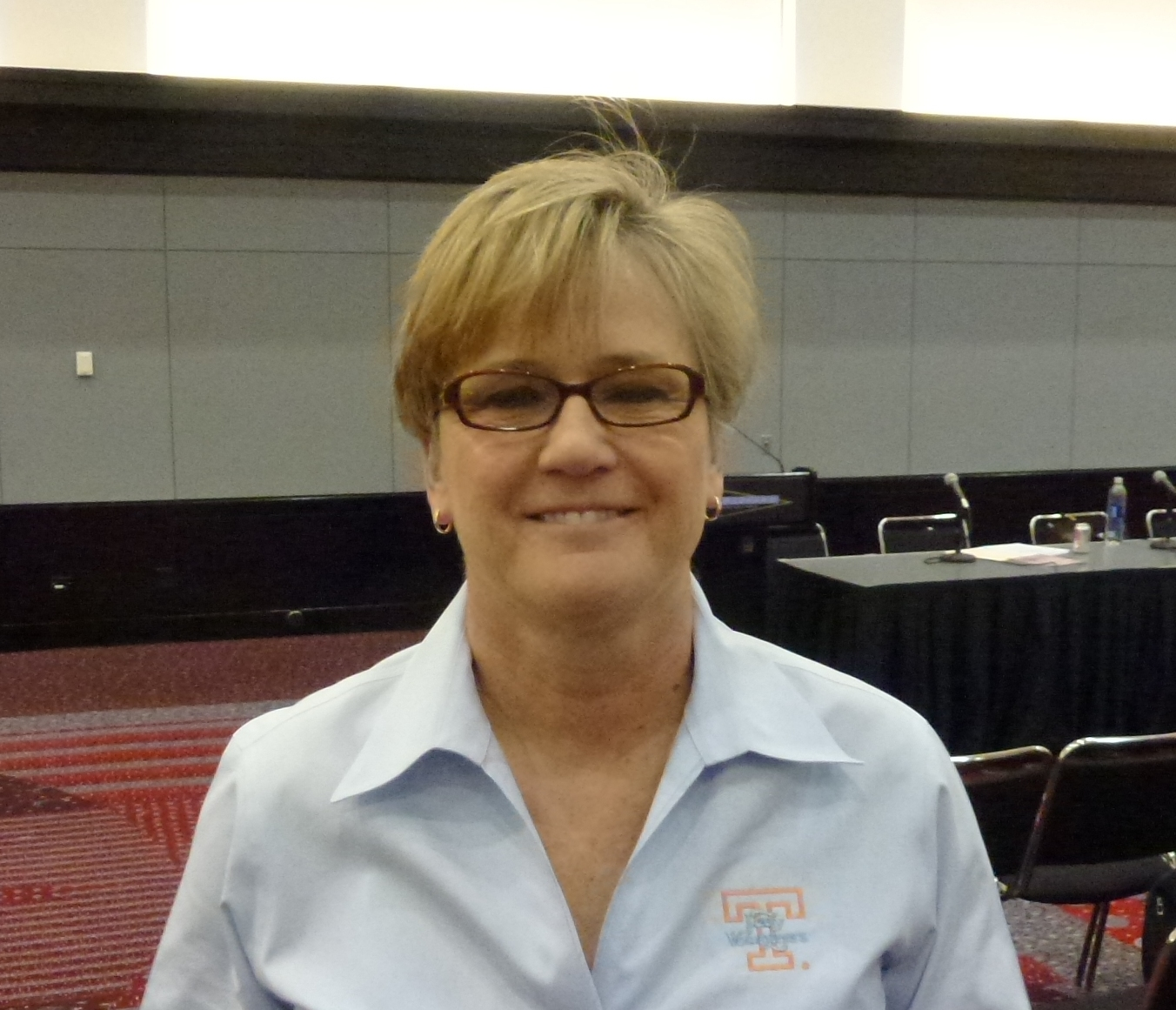
- Warlick in 2012

Biographical details
- Born: June 11, 1958 (age 68); Knoxville, Tennessee, U.S.

Playing career
- 1976–1980: Tennessee
- Position: Guard

Coaching career (HC unless noted)
- 1981–1983: Virginia Tech (assistant)
- 1983–1985: Nebraska (assistant)
- 1985–2012: Tennessee (assistant)
- 2012–2019: Tennessee

Head coaching record
- Overall: 172–67 (.720)
- Tournaments: 13–7 (.650) (NCAA); 10–7 (.588) (SEC)

Accomplishments and honors

Championships
- SEC tournament (2014); 2× SEC regular season (2013, 2015); 8× NCAA Division I Tournament (1987, 1989, 1991, 1996–1998, 2007, 2008, as assistant)

Awards
- As a player: Kodak All-American (1980); As a coach WBCA Assistant Coach of the Year (2007); Maggie Dixon Award (2013)
- Women's Basketball Hall of Fame
Medal record
Women's Basketball
Representing United States
Jones Cup
Gold medal – first place	1979 Taipei	Team competition
Pan American Games
Silver medal – second place	1979 San Juan	Team competition
World Championship
Gold medal – first place	1979 Seoul	Team competition
Assistant Coach for United States
World University Games
Gold medal – first place	2015 South Korea	Team competition

Frances Hollingsworth "Holly" Warlick (born June 11, 1958) is an American college basketball coach who was head coach for the Tennessee Lady Volunteers. She replaced head coach Pat Summitt prior to the 2012–13 season and held the position until the end of the 2018–19 season. Warlick was inducted into the Women's Basketball Hall of Fame in 2001.

== Playing history ==
Born Frances Hollingsworth Warlick in Knoxville, Tennessee, Warlick played for Tennessee under Pat Summitt where she was a three-time All-American point guard and set several school records. She was also the first player in Tennessee sports history to have her jersey retired at the end of her playing career and was named to the 1980 US Olympic Basketball Team. Warlick played in the Women's Professional Basketball League for the Nebraska Wranglers. She was named a WPBL All-Star in 1981 when the Wranglers captured a championship, and she was inducted into the Women's Basketball Hall of Fame in 2001.

== USA Basketball ==
Warlick was named to the team representing the US at the 1979 William Jones Cup competition in Taipei, Taiwan. The USA team won all six games en route to the gold medal.

Warlick traveled to San Juan, Puerto Rico to take part in the 1979 Pan American Games. The USA team won their first five games to advance to the gold medal game, but faced Cuba in the final, and lost 91–86 to take the silver medal. Warlick recorded seven assist for the team.

The National team representing the USA had not won a World Championship since 1957. In 1979, the World Championships were held in Seoul, South Korea. Warlick was one of twelve players on the squad. In the opener against South Korea, the USA team was upset; they then faced Italy and had a close call, winning 66–64. In the final game, the USA faced Canada, who had not lost. With the a 4–1 record, the USA did not simply need to win, but needed to by more than 13 points to secure the gold. The USA ended up winning by 16 points. Warlick averaged 1.0 point per game.

Warlick was selected to be a member of the team representing the US at the 1980 Olympics, but the team did not go, due to the 1980 Olympic boycott. The team did go 6–1 in Olympic Qualifying games, with Warlick scoring 1.3 points per game, along with eleven assists, second most on the team.

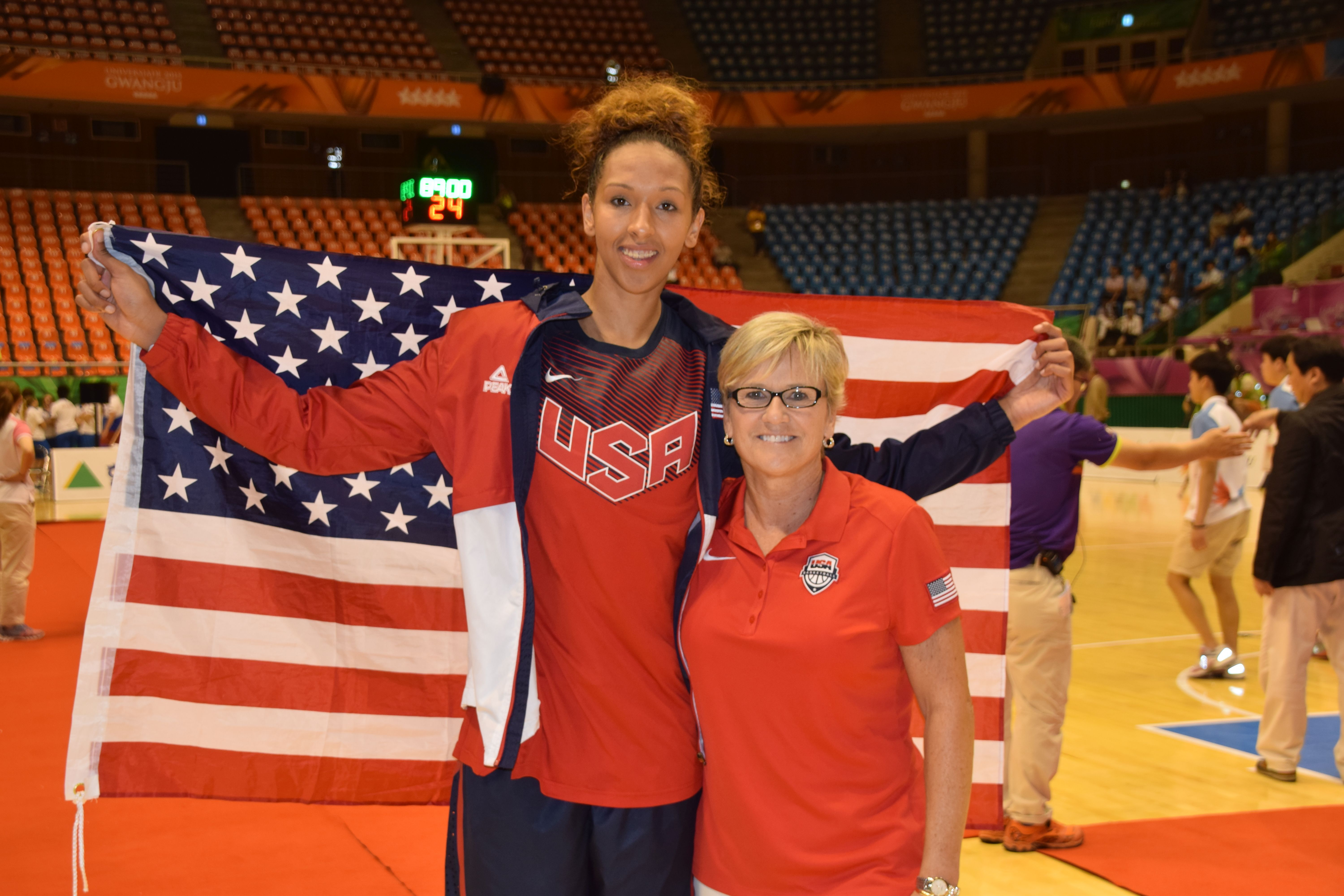
Mercedes Russell with coach Holly Warlick after the World University gold medal game in South Korea

Warlick was selected to be an assistant coach of the USA team at the World University Games held in Seoul, South Korea July 5–13, 2015. The team won all six games, including the championship game against Canada. The first three quarters, the game was quite close with four ties and four lead changes, but in the fourth the USA exploded for 34 points to pull out to a large lead, winning the gold-medal 82–63.

== Coaching history ==
In 1981, Warlick enrolled in graduate school at Virginia Tech and became an assistant coach with the Virginia Tech Hokies women's basketball team. Warlick graduated with a M.S. in athletic administration in 1983, with her thesis titled Public Relations Guide to Promote the College Female Athlete. Warlick was an assistant coach at Nebraska from 1983 to 1985.

Warlick joined Tennessee as assistant basketball coach in 1985. She was given the head coach position for the 2012–2013 season although Summitt admitted that Warlick had been "doing the bulk of it" since Summitt's diagnosis of Alzheimer's disease in August 2011. Warlick led the Lady Vols to the SEC 2012–13 regular season title. On March 9, 2014, Warlick coached the Lady Vols to their 17th SEC Tournament Championship by defeating Kentucky 71–70.

Warlick's coaching debut was an 80–71 loss to the Chattanooga Lady Mocs in Chattanooga on November 9, 2012. In her first year as head coach, the team had a record of 27 wins and 8 losses. The season ended with a loss to Louisville in the Elite 8. The WBCA recognized this performance by selecting her for the Maggie Dixon Award, which is awarded to the coach with the best performance in their rookie year as a head coach. Warlick's second season saw her lead the Lady Vols to a 29–6 record. The season ended with a loss to Maryland in the Sweet 16. The 2014–15 season saw Tennessee share the regular season SEC Championship with South Carolina. Tennessee went 30–6 and saw their season end in the Elite 8 to Maryland. The next season saw Warlick lead the Lady Vols to a 22–14 record. The season ended with a loss to Syracuse in the Elite 8. The 2016–17 season saw the Lady Vols finish with a 20–12 record and a loss in the Round of 32 to Louisville. The next season saw Warlick and the Lady Vols finish 25–8 with a Round of 32 loss to Oregon State. In the 2018–19 season, Warlick and the Lady Vols went 19–13. As an 11-seed, they lost in the first round of the NCAA Tournament to UCLA.

Warlick was fired on March 27, 2019, by Athletic Director Phillip Fulmer.

== Head coaching record ==
Record table
Season	Team	Overall	Conference	Standing	Postseason
Tennessee Lady Volunteers (Southeastern Conference) (2012–2019)
2012–13	Tennessee	27–8	14–2	1st	NCAA Elite Eight
2013–14	Tennessee	29–6	13–3	T–2nd	NCAA Sweet Sixteen
2014–15	Tennessee	30–6	15–1	T–1st	NCAA Elite Eight
2015–16	Tennessee	22–14	8–8	T–7th	NCAA Elite Eight
2016–17	Tennessee	20–12	10–6	5th	NCAA Second Round
2017–18	Tennessee	25–8	11–5	T–4th	NCAA Second Round
2018–19	Tennessee	19–13	7–9	T–8th	NCAA First Round
Tennessee:		172–67 (.720)	78–34 (.696)		
Total:		172–67 (.720)			
National champion Postseason invitational champion Conference regular season champion Conference regular season and conference tournament champion Division regular season champion Division regular season and conference tournament champion Conference tournament champion
