= 1988–89 NCAA Division I women's basketball rankings =

- Season: 1988–89
- NCAA Tournament: 1989
- Preseason No. 1: Tennessee
- NCAA Tournament Champions: Tennessee
NCAA Division I women's basketball rankings


Two human polls comprise the 1988–89 NCAA Division I women's basketball rankings, the AP Poll and the Coaches Poll, in addition to various publications' preseason polls. The AP poll is currently a poll of sportswriters, while the USA Today Coaches' Poll is a poll of college coaches. The AP conducts polls weekly through the end of the regular season and conference play, while the Coaches poll conducts a final, post-NCAA tournament poll as well. The poll produced a list of the top 20 teams from the inception through the 1988–89 season. In 1989–90, the change was made to produce a list of the top 25 teams.

== Legend ==
–	Not ranked
(#)	Ranking

== AP Poll ==
Team	21-Nov	28-Nov	5-Dec	12-Dec	19-Dec	26-Dec	2-Jan	9-Jan	16-Jan	23-Jan	30-Jan	6-Feb	13-Feb	20-Feb	26-Feb	6-Mar	13-Mar
Tennessee	1	1	1	1	1	1	1	2	2	2	2	3	3	2	2	2	1
Auburn	7	5	4	4	3	3	3	1	1	1	1	1	1	1	1	1	2
Louisiana Tech	6	4	3	3	2	2	2	4	3	3	3	2	2	3	3	3	3
Stanford	8	6	5	5	6	9	8	7	7	6	4	4	4	4	4	4	4
Maryland	10	13	13	9	9	8	5	8	8	7	6	6	6	6	5	5	5
Texas	3	9	8	10	13	13	14	14	11	10	11	9	8	8	6	6	6
Long Beach St.	2	2	9	7	8	7	11	11	10	9	10	11	9	9	7	7	7
Iowa	5	7	11	8	7	6	6	5	5	4	7	7	7	7	9	8	8
Colorado	–	–	T20	–	–	–	–	–	20	18	16	15	15	10	10	9	9
Georgia	4	3	2	2	4	4	7	6	6	5	5	5	5	5	8	10	10
Stephen F. Austin	–	–	T20	17	16	16	15	13	17	17	14	13	11	13	13	11	11
Ole Miss	9	8	6	6	5	5	4	3	4	8	8	8	12	12	12	12	12
North Carolina St.	16	15	–	–	–	–	19	19	16	13	13	12	13	15	14	13	13
Ohio St.	12	17	–	–	–	–	–	–	–	–	20	–	–	20	15	15	14
Purdue	–	16	14	12	12	12	10	9	9	11	9	10	10	11	11	14	15
UNLV	–	–	–	–	–	20	18	18	19	19	18	17	16	17	16	16	16
South Carolina	–	–	19	18	17	17	17	16	15	16	17	16	18	14	17	17	17
La Salle	–	–	–	–	–	–	–	–	–	–	–	20	19	19	18	18	18
Western Ky.	14	12	10	15	18	18	–	–	–	–	–	–	–	–	–	–	19
Old Dominion	–	–	–	–	–	–	–	–	–	20	–	–	–	–	19	19	20
Clemson	–	–	–	–	–	–	–	20	–	–	–	–	–	–	–	–	–
Duke	–	–	–	20	19	–	20	–	–	–	–	–	–	–	–	–	–
Illinois St.	–	–	T20	–	–	–	–	–	–	–	–	–	–	–	–	–	–
LSU	19	–	16	13	11	11	9	10	14	12	12	18	20	–	–	–	–
Rutgers	15	11	12	11	10	10	12	17	18	–	–	–	–	–	–	20	–
Saint Joseph’s	18	19	18	19	20	19	–	–	–	–	–	–	–	–	–	–	–
San Diego St.	20	20	15	16	15	15	16	15	12	14	19	19	17	16	–	–	–
Southern California	17	14	17	–	–	–	–	–	–	–	–	–	–	–	–	–	–
Virginia	11	10	7	14	14	14	13	12	13	15	15	14	14	18	20	–	–
Washington	13	18	–	–	–	–	–	–	–	–	–	–	–	–	–	–	–

== USA Today Coaches poll ==
Team	18-Nov	6-Dec	13-Dec	20-Dec	27-Dec	3-Jan	10-Jan	17-Jan	24-Jan	31-Jan	7-Feb	14-Feb	21-Feb	28-Feb	7-Mar	14-Mar	19-Mar
Tennessee	1	1	1	1	1	1	2	2	2	2	3	3	2	2	1	1	1
Auburn	7	4	4	3	3	3	1	1	1	1	1	1	1	1	2	2	2
Maryland	10	12	9	9	8	5	8	8	7	4	4	4	4	4	4	4	3
Louisiana Tech	6	3	3	2	2	2	4	3	3	3	2	2	3	3	3	3	4
Stanford	9	5	5	7	10	9	7	7	6	5	5	5	5	5	5	5	5
Texas	4	7	11	12	13	16	16	12	10	11	9	8	8	6	6	6	6
Long Beach St.	2	9	8	6	6	11	11	10	9	10	11	9	9	7	7	7	7
Ole Miss	8	6	6	4	4	4	3	4	8	8	8	12	10	11	9	9	8
Ohio St.	12	24	–	–	–	–	–	–	24	21	22	23	21	15	15	15	9
North Carolina St.	15	19	20	22	18	19	18	14	13	13	12	13	14	14	14	13	10
Iowa	5	10	7	8	7	7	5	5	5	7	7	7	7	9	8	8	11
UNLV	–	–	–	24	22	18	17	19	18	14	16	16	17	18	18	17	12
Clemson	24	–	–	–	–	–	24	–	–	–	–	–	25	25	25	22	13
LSU	21	16	10	10	9	8	10	13	11	12	19	21	24	22	19	18	14
Virginia	11	8	14	14	15	13	12	16	16	16	14	14	18	21	22	19	15
Stephen F. Austin	–	–	19	17	17	17	15	18	19	15	13	11	13	13	13	12	16
Purdue	–	14	12	13	12	10	9	9	12	9	10	10	11	10	11	14	17
Georgia	3	2	2	5	5	6	6	6	4	6	6	6	6	8	10	10	18
Colorado	–	25	–	–	–	–	–	22	21	18	15	15	12	12	12	11	19
Rutgers	14	13	13	11	11	15	19	17	22	22	21	22	22	20	21	23	20
Old Dominion	–	–	–	–	–	24	–	24	20	23	20	18	19	16	17	20	21
South Carolina	23	20	17	16	16	14	14	15	15	17	17	19	16	19	16	16	22
Saint Joseph’s	16	17	18	18	19	20	20	20	17	20	25	–	–	–	–	–	23
Tennessee Tech	–	–	–	–	–	–	–	–	–	–	–	–	–	–	–	–	24
James Madison	22	–	–	–	–	25	25	23	25	24	–	–	–	–	–	25	25
Duke	–	–	23	20	23	23	23	–	–	–	–	–	–	–	–	–	–
Illinois St.	–	23	–	–	–	–	–	–	–	–	–	–	–	–	–	–	–
La Salle	–	–	–	–	–	–	–	–	–	–	–	25	23	24	23	–	–
Middle Tenn.	–	–	–	25	25	–	–	–	–	–	–	–	–	–	–	–	–
Nebraska	25	–	–	–	–	–	–	–	–	–	–	–	–	–	–	–	–
San Diego St.	20	15	15	15	14	12	13	11	14	19	18	17	15	23	24	–	–
Southern California	17	18	24	–	–	–	–	–	–	–	–	–	–	–	–	–	–
Vanderbilt	–	–	22	21	21	21	21	21	23	25	24	20	20	17	20	21	–
Wake Forest	19	21	21	23	24	–	–	25	–	–	–	–	–	–	–	–	–
Washington	13	22	25	–	–	–	–	–	–	–	23	24	–	–	–	–	–
Western Ky.	18	11	16	19	20	22	22	–	–	–	–	–	–	–	–	24	–
