= Ohio State basketball =

Ohio State basketball may refer to:

- Ohio State Buckeyes men's basketball
- Ohio State Buckeyes women's basketball
