= 1988–89 Maryland Terrapins women's basketball team =

Intercollegiate basketball season

1988–89 Maryland Terrapins women's basketball

ACC Regular season & Tournament champions

NCAA Tournament, Final Four
- Conference: Atlantic Coast Conference

Ranking
- Coaches: No. 3
- AP: No. 5
- Record: 29–3 (13–1 ACC)
- Head coach: Chris Weller (7th season)
- Home arena: Cole Field House

1988–89 ACC women's basketball standings
	Conf.				Overall
Team	W		L	PCT	W		L	PCT
No. 5 Maryland †	13	–	1	.929	29	–	3	.906
No. 13 NC State	12	–	2	.857	24	–	7	.774
Clemson	9	–	5	.643	20	–	11	.645
Virginia	8	–	6	.571	21	–	10	.677
Wake Forest	6	–	8	.429	16	–	12	.571
Georgia Tech	5	–	9	.357	14	–	14	.500
Duke	2	–	12	.143	12	–	16	.429
North Carolina	1	–	13	.071	10	–	20	.333
† 1989 ACC tournament winner Rankings from AP poll

The 1988–89 Maryland Terrapins women's basketball team represented the University of Maryland, College Park as a member of the Atlantic Coast Conference during 1988–89 NCAA Division I women's basketball season. The team was led by head coach Chris Weller and played their home games at Cole Field House. The Lady Terrapins won the ACC regular season championship and the 1989 ACC women's basketball tournament. Maryland received an automatic bid to the NCAA women's basketball tournament where they advanced to the second Final Four in program history.

== Roster ==
1988–89 Maryland Terrapins women's basketball team
Players
Coaches

Pos.	#	Name	Height	Year	Previous school	Hometown
G	12	Deanna Tate	—	Sr
F	23	Vicky Bullett	6 ft 3 in (1.91 m)	Sr	Martinsburg	Martinsburg, WV

Head coach

Chris Weller

Assistant coach(es)

Legend

- (C) Team captain
- (S) Suspended
- (I) Ineligible
- (W) Walk-on
- Injured
- Current redshirt

== Schedule ==
Date time, TV	Rank^{#}	Opponent^{#}	Result	Record	Site (attendance) city, state
Regular season
Feb 25, 1989	No. 5	Wake Forest	W 86–70	23–2 (13–1)	Cole Field House; College Park, Maryland
ACC tournament
March 4, 1989*	(1) No. 5	vs. (8) North Carolina; Quarterfinals	W 93–68	24–2	Civic Center; Fayetteville, North Carolina
March 5, 1989*	(1) No. 5	vs. (4) Virginia; Semifinals	W 89–66	25–2	Civic Center; Fayetteville, North Carolina
March 6, 1989*	(1) No. 5	vs. (2) No. 13 NC State; Championship game	W 73–57	26–2	Civic Center (2,975); Fayetteville, North Carolina
NCAA tournament
March 18, 1989*	(1 W) No. 5	(8 W) Bowling Green; Second round	W 73–68	27–2	Cole Field House; College Park, Maryland
March 23, 1989*	(1 W) No. 5	vs. (4 W) No. 11 Stephen F. Austin; Regional Semifinal – Sweet Sixteen	W 89–54	28–2	Frank Erwin Center; Austin, Texas
March 25, 1989*	(1 W) No. 5	at (2 W) No. 6 Texas; Regional Final – Elite Eight	W 79–71	29–2	Frank Erwin Center; Austin, Texas
Mar 31, 1989*	(1 W) No. 5	vs. (1 E) No. 1 Tennessee; National Semifinal – Final Four	L 65–77	29–3	Tacoma Dome; Tacoma, Washington
*Non-conference game. ^{#}Rankings from AP Poll, ( ) Tournament seedings in parentheses. (#) Tournament seedings in parentheses. All times are in Eastern Time.

== Rankings ==
Ranking movements Legend: ██ Increase in ranking ██ Decrease in ranking
	Week																	
Poll	1	2	3	4	5	6	7	8	9	10	11	12	13	14	15	16	17	Final
AP	10	13	13	9	9	8	5	8	8	7	6	6	6	6	5	5	5	Not released
Coaches	10	10	12	9	9	8	5	8	8	7	4	4	4	4	4	4	4	3

^Coaches did not release a Week 2 poll.

== See also ==
1988–89 Maryland Terrapins men's basketball team
