= Tyler Summitt =

American basketball player and coach (born 1990)

Biographical details
- Born: September 21, 1990 (age 36); Knoxville, Tennessee, U.S.

Playing career
- 2010–2012: Tennessee
- Position: Guard

Coaching career (HC unless noted)
- 2012–2014: Marquette (assistant)
- 2014–2016: Louisiana Tech

Head coaching record
- Overall: 30–31 (.492)

Ross Tyler Summitt (born September 21, 1990) is an American former college basketball player and coach.

== Early years ==
Summitt was born September 21, 1990, to R. B. Summitt, II and Pat Head Summitt. Pat Summitt was the legendary head coach of the University of Tennessee women's basketball team from 1974 to 2012. Throughout his childhood, Summitt was often photographed with his mother at UT women’s basketball games and championships. In 2006, Summitt graduated cum laude from high school at the Webb School of Knoxville where he was a three-year starter in basketball. In his senior year, Summitt earned Scholar-Athlete of the Year and the Spartan Award as a point guard. He played basketball at the University of Tennessee as a freshman and sophomore. He was a 6'1", 180 lb guard.

== Coaching career ==
=== Marquette University ===
Summitt served as scouting coordinator and offensive coach for Marquette University from 2012 to 2014.

=== Louisiana Tech ===
On April 1, 2014, Summitt was hired as head coach for women’s basketball at Louisiana Tech University. He led his team to a 16–15 record in his first season and 14–16 in his second season. Summitt resigned on April 7, 2016, after an extramarital affair with player Brooke Pumroy was exposed.

== Head coaching record ==
Record table
Season	Team	Overall	Conference	Standing	Postseason
Louisiana Tech Lady Techsters (Conference USA) (2014–2016)
2014–15	Louisiana Tech	16–15	10–8	T–7th	
2015–16	Louisiana Tech	14–16	9–9	T–6th	
Louisiana Tech:		30–31 (.492)	19–17 (.528)		
Total:		30–31 (.492)			
National champion Postseason invitational champion Conference regular season champion Conference regular season and conference tournament champion Division regular season champion Division regular season and conference tournament champion Conference tournament champion

== Personal life and controversy ==
Summitt was first married to Anne Dennis "AnDe" Ragsdale, whom he wed on June 1, 2013.

In 2012, Summitt was a first-year assistant coach at Marquette University where freshman student Brooklyn Pumroy was a guard. In 2014, Summitt was hired as the head coach of women's basketball at Louisiana Tech University, prompting Pumroy to transfer to that school, which sparked rumors that she and Summitt were involved in an extramarital affair.

Rochelle Vasquez, who was a junior guard and Pumroy's roommate, said athletic director Tommy McClelland and other school officials knew about the affair. Vasquez and the team's leading scorer, Brandi Wingate, said Pumroy had told them about the affair and that the team's perception of Summitt's favoritism for Pumroy divided the team to the point that players were resorting to violence against each other. Amid the scandal, the team lost seven of its last nine games.

Summitt resigned from his position at Louisiana Tech University on April 7, 2016. Summitt and Ragsdale divorced in June 2017, and he married Pumroy in December 2018. Summitt and Pumroy live in London, Ohio with their sons, Breck and Rocky, and daughter, Patricia.

In 2019, Brooke Summitt was hired as head coach of Fairborn High School girls basketball. When the announcement of her hire was released, it included a quote from Brooke Summitt saying her husband would be her assistant coach. After backlash followed the announcement of Summitt as assistant coach, Fairborn High School athletic director Kevin Alexander called the quote a miscommunication and announced that Tyler Summitt had not applied for the job nor had he been approved by the Fairborn City School board of education as required, and that Tyler Summitt would not coach at the high school.

Summitt has said he will no longer coach professionally. He receives more than $173,000 a year as the beneficiary of his mother's state pension. Summitt helps with the Pat Summitt Foundation and efforts to fight Alzheimer’s disease.
