= Bridgette Gordon =

American basketball player and coach (born 1967)

Florida A&M Rattlers
- Title: Head coach
- League: Southwestern Athletic Conference

Personal information
- Born: April 27, 1967 (age 59) DeLand, Florida, U.S.
- Listed height: 6 ft 0 in (1.83 m)
- Listed weight: 159 lb (72 kg)

Career information
- High school: DeLand (DeLand, Florida)
- College: Tennessee (1985–1989)
- WNBA draft: 1997: Initial allocation round
- Drafted by: Sacramento Monarchs
- Playing career: 1997–1998
- Position: Forward
- Coaching career: 2004–present

Career history

Playing
- 1997–1998: Sacramento Monarchs

Coaching
- 2004–2006: Stetson (asst.)
- 2007–2010: Georgia State (asst.)
- 2010–2017: Wichita State (asst.)
- 2017–2019: Tennessee (asst.)
- 2019–2021: SMU (asst.)
- 2022–2023: Cincinnati (asst.)
- 2023: New Mexico State (asst.)
- 2023–present: Florida A&M

Career highlights
- 2× NCAA champion (1987, 1989); NCAA Tournament MOP (1989); Honda Sports Award (1989); 2× All-American – USBWA (1988, 1989); 2× Kodak All-American (1988, 1989); SEC Female Athlete of the Year (1989); SEC Player of the Year (1989); 2× SEC tournament MVP (1988, 1989); 2× First-team All-SEC (1988, 1989); 2× All-SEC (1986, 1987); SEC Freshman of the Year (1986)
- Stats at Basketball Reference
- Women's Basketball Hall of Fame
Medals
Women's basketball
Representing the United States
Pan American Games
Bronze medal – third place	1991 Havana	Team
Olympic Games
Gold medal – first place	1988 Seoul	Team competition

Bridgette Cyrene Gordon (born April 27, 1967) is the head women's basketball coach of Florida A&M University, and a former player. She was a member of the United States women's national basketball team, that claimed the gold medal at the 1988 Olympic Games in Seoul, South Korea.

In 2007, Gordon was elected to the Women's Basketball Hall of Fame, located in Knoxville, Tennessee.

== USA Basketball ==
Gordon was selected to be a member of the team representing the US at the 1987 World University Games held in Zagreb, Yugoslavia. The USA team won four of the five contests. In the opening game against Poland, Gordon was the leading scorer for the US with 18 points. After winning their next game against Finland, the USA faced the host team Yugoslavia. The game went to overtime, but Yugoslavia prevailed, 93–89. The USA faced China in the next game. They won 84–83, but they needed to win by at least five points to remain in medal contention. They won the final game against Canada to secure fifth place.

Gordon continued on the USA national team when the team played at the 1988 Olympics, held in Seoul, South Korea. She averaged 8.8 points per game, including 20 points against Yugoslavia to help the team win all five games and earn the gold medal.

Gordon also played with the USA team at the 1991 Pan American Games. The team finished with a record of 4–2, but managed to win the bronze medal. The USA team lost a three-point game to Brazil, then responded with wins over Argentina and Cuba, earning a spot in the medal round. The next game was a rematch against Cuba, and this time the team from Cuba won a five-point game. The USA beat Canada easily to win the bronze. Gordon averaged 11.3 points per game.

== WNBA career ==
Gordon was selected in the initial player allocation of the 1997 WNBA draft by the Sacramento Monarchs on January 22, 1997. She would only play a total of 50 games in the WNBA, all 50 with the Monarchs. Her debut game was played on June 21, 1997, in a 73–61 win over the Utah Starzz where she recorded 12 points, 3 rebounds, 3 assists and 3 steals. In her rookie season, Gordon played in all 28 of the Monarch's regular season games and started in all 28 of them while averaging 13.0 points, 4.8 rebounds, 2.8 assists. The team finished with a 10–18 record and missed the playoffs.

In the 1998 season, Gordon started in the first 5 games of the season but then lost her starting spot to Latasha Byears and had her minutes per game drop from 35.0 to 11.5. Due to the drop in minutes, Gordon's stats across the board dropped down to 2.7 points, 1.3 rebounds and 0.4 assists. The Monarchs had an even worse record than the previous year by finishing 8–22.

Gordon was waived by the Monarchs on May 3, 1999. She signed a contract with the New York Liberty but would be waived on May 24, 1999, before playing a game for them. After being waived by the Liberty, she would not play in the WNBA again.

Her final WNBA game was played on August 12, 1998, in a 71–81 loss to the Starzz where she recorded 2 points and 1 assist.

== Career statistics ==
Legend
GP	Games played	GS	Games started	MPG	Minutes per game	RPG	Rebounds per game
APG	Assists per game	SPG	Steals per game	BPG	Blocks per game	PPG	Points per game
TO	Turnovers per game	FG%	Field-goal percentage	3P%	3-point field-goal percentage	FT%	Free-throw percentage
**Bold**	Career best	°	League leader

=== WNBA ===
==== Regular season ====
Year	Team	GP	GS	MPG	FG%	3P%	FT%	RPG	APG	SPG	BPG	TO	PPG
1997	Sacramento	**28**°	**28**°	**35.0**	**.433**	**.275**	**.785**	**4.8**	**2.8**	**1.4**	**.3**	3.0	**13.0**
1998	Sacramento	22	5	11.5	.391	.000	.563	1.3	.4	.4	.0	**1.4**	2.7
Career	2 years, 1 team	50	33	24.7	.426	.229	.756	3.3	1.7	.9	.2	2.3	8.5

=== College ===
Year	Team	GP	GS	MPG	FG%	3P%	FT%	RPG	APG	SPG	BPG	TO	PPG
1987–88	Tennessee	33	-	-	**54.1**	**75.0**	**70.2**	6.8	2.4	2.3	**0.5**	-	**20.8**
1988–89	Tennessee	**36**	-	-	53.3	33.3	70.0	**7.0**	**2.7**	**2.9**	0.4	-	20.4
**Career**		69	-	-	53.7	50.0	70.1	6.9	2.6	2.6	0.5	-	20.6
Statistics retrieved from Sports-Reference.

== Awards and honors ==
- 1989—Winner of the Honda Sports Award for basketball
- 2x FIBA Women's European Champions Cup (current EuroLeague) with Italian club Pool Comense (1993–94, 1994–95)
