= 1989 NCAA Division I women's basketball tournament =

American college basketball tournament

- Teams: 48
- Finals site: Tacoma Dome, Tacoma, Washington
- Champions: Tennessee Volunteers (2nd title, 3rd title game, 6th Final Four)
- Runner-up: Auburn Tigers (2nd title game, 2nd Final Four)
- Semifinalists: Louisiana Tech Lady Techsters (6th Final Four); Maryland Terrapins (2nd Final Four)
- Winning coach: Pat Summitt (2nd title)
- MOP: Bridgette Gordon (Tennessee)

The 1989 NCAA Division I women's basketball tournament began on March 15 and ended on April 2. The tournament expanded from 40 to 48 teams. The Final Four consisted of Auburn, Louisiana Tech, Tennessee, and Maryland, with Tennessee winning its second title with a 76–60 victory over Auburn. Tennessee's Bridgette Gordon was named the Most Outstanding Player of the tournament.

== Records ==
Auburn has only six turnovers in the National Semi-final game against Louisiana Tech, the fewest turnovers recorded in a Final Four game.

Bridgette Gordon scored 17 points from the free throw line in the East Regional final between Tennessee and Long Beach state, the most ever scored in an NCAA tournament game.

Maryland had 25 steals in a game against Stephen F. Austin in the West Regional semifinal, the most in an NCAA tournament game, since the statistic has been recorded (starting in 1988).

Jennifer Azzi hit nine of eleven three point attempts over the course of the tournament, the best percentage ever recorded in a tournament game (minimum- 1.5 made per game)

Stanford hit 22 of 33 three point attempts over the course of the tournament, the best percentage ever recorded in a tournament game (minimum - three games)

== Qualifying teams – automatic ==
Forty-eight teams were selected to participate in the 1989 NCAA Tournament. Nineteen conferences were eligible for an automatic bid to the 1989 NCAA tournament.

Automatic bids
		Record		
Qualifying school	Conference	Regular Season	Conference	Seed
Bowling Green State University	MAC	25–3	16–0	9
University of Tennessee at Chattanooga	Southern Conference	19–11	5–5	12
University of Colorado at Boulder	Big Eight	27–3	14–0	3
University of Connecticut	Big East	24–5	13–2	8
College of the Holy Cross	MAAC	21–9	10–2	9
Illinois State University	Missouri Valley Conference	22–7	16–2	7
James Madison University	Colonial	25–3	12–0	6
California State University, Long Beach	Big West Conference	28–4	18–0	2
University of Maryland, College Park	ACC	26–2	13–1	1
University of Montana	Big Sky Conference	26–3	16–0	10
Ohio State University	Big Ten	23–5	16–2	3
University of South Carolina	Metro	23–6	10–2	6
Stanford University	Pac-10	26–2	18–0	2
University of Tennessee	SEC	30–2	8–1	1
Tennessee Technological University	Ohio Valley Conference	21–7	9–3	11
University of Texas at Austin	Southwest	25–4	16–0	2
University of Utah	High Country	24–5	9–1	11
West Virginia University	Atlantic 10	23–7	12–6	12
Western Kentucky University	Sun Belt Conference	22–8	5–1	5

== Qualifying teams – at-large ==
Twenty-nine additional teams were selected to complete the forty-eight invitations.

At-large bids
		Record		
Qualifying school	Conference	Regular Season	Conference	Seed
University of Arkansas	Southwest	22–7	13–3	12
Auburn University	Southeastern	28–1	9–0	1
California State University, Fullerton	Big West	21–8	12–6	7
University of Cincinnati	Metro	21–8	6–6	8
Clemson University	Atlantic Coast	19–10	9–5	4
University of Georgia	Southeastern	22–6	6–3	5
University of Hawaiʻi at Mānoa	Big West	18–9	13–3	12
University of Iowa	Big Ten	26–4	16–2	3
La Salle University	Metro Atlantic	27–2	11–1	9
Louisiana Tech University	American South	29–3	10–0	1
Louisiana State University	Southeastern	18–10	5–4	4
University of Miami	Independent	21–7	-–	8
University of Mississippi (Ole Miss)	Southeastern	21–7	4–5	3
North Carolina State University	Atlantic Coast	23–6	12–2	2
Northwestern State University	Southland	22–7	11–3	10
Oklahoma State University–Stillwater	Big Eight	19–11	8–6	9
Old Dominion University	Sun Belt	22–8	5–1	6
Providence College	Big East	22–10	10–6	11
Purdue University	Big Ten	23–5	14–4	5
Rutgers University	Atlantic 10	23–6	16–2	7
University of Southern Mississippi	Metro	26–4	10–2	10
Saint Joseph's University	Atlantic 10	22–7	16–2	10
Stephen F. Austin State University	Southland	29–3	13–1	4
Temple University	Atlantic 10	21–9	14–4	8
University of Nevada, Las Vegas	Big West	25–6	13–5	6
Vanderbilt University	Southeastern	21–7	5–4	7
Villanova University	Big East	18–11	11–5	11
University of Virginia	Atlantic Coast	20–9	8–6	4
University of Washington	Pacific-10	22–9	15–3	5

== Bids by conference ==
Nineteen conferences earned an automatic bid. In seven cases, the automatic bid was the only representative from the conference. Two conferences, Southland and American South sent a single representative as an at-large team. One team earned an at-large bid as an Independent Twenty-six additional at-large teams were selected from ten of the conferences.

Bids	Conference	Teams
6	Southeastern	Auburn, Georgia, LSU, Ole Miss, Tennessee, Vanderbilt
4	Big West	Cal St Fullerton, Hawaii, Long Beach St, UNLV
4	Atlantic Coast	Clemson, Maryland, North Carolina St, Virginia
4	Atlantic 10	Rutgers, St Joseph's, Temple, West Virginia
3	Metro	Cincinnati, South Carolina, Southern Miss
3	Big Ten	Iowa, Ohio St, Purdue
3	Big East	Connecticut, Providence, Villanova
2	Sun Belt	Old Dominion, Western Ky
2	Southwest	Arkansas, Texas
2	Southland	Northwestern St, Stephen F. Austin
2	Pacific-10	Stanford, Washington
2	Metro Atlantic	Holy Cross, La Salle
2	Big Eight	Colorado, Oklahoma St
1	Southern	Chattanooga
1	Ohio Valley	Tennessee Tech
1	Missouri Valley	Illinois St
1	Mid-American	Bowling Green
1	Independent	Miami
1	High Country	Utah
1	Colonial	James Madison
1	Big Sky	Montana
1	American South	Louisiana Tech

== First and second rounds ==
In 1989, the field expanded to 48 teams. The teams were seeded, and assigned to four geographic regions, with seeds 1–12 in each region. In Round 1, seeds 8 and 9 faced each other for the opportunity to face the 1 seed in the second round, seeds 7 and 10 played for the opportunity to face the 2 seed, seeds 5 and 12 played for the opportunity to face the 4 seed, and seeds 6 and 11 played for the opportunity to face the 3 seed. In the first two rounds, the higher seed was given the opportunity to host the first-round game. In most cases, the higher seed accepted the opportunity. The exceptions:

- Fifth seeded Purdue played fourth seeded LSU at Purdue
- Tenth seeded Montana played seventh seeded Cal St. Fullerton at Montana
- Ninth seeded Oklahoma State played eighth seeded Miami(FL) at Oklahoma State
- Seventh seeded Vanderbilt played tenth seeded St. Joseph's at St. Joseph's
- Ninth seeded Bowling Green played eighth seeded Cincinnati at Bowling Green

Because Purdue was also a first round venue, there are only 31 rather than 32 first and second round venues

The following table lists the region, host school, venue and the thirty-one first and second round locations:

1989 NCAA first round
1989 NCAA second round

Region	Rnd	Host	Venue	City	State
East	1	Western Kentucky University	E.A. Diddle Arena	Bowling Green	Kentucky
East	1	James Madison University	James Madison University Convocation Center	Harrisonburg	Virginia
East	1	University of Connecticut	Hugh S. Greer Field House	Storrs	Connecticut
East	1	Vanderbilt University	Memorial Gymnasium (Vanderbilt University)	Nashville	Tennessee
East	1	University of Tennessee	Thompson-Boling Arena	Knoxville	Tennessee
East	2	Ohio State University	St. John Arena	Columbus	Ohio
East	2	Long Beach State	University Gym (Gold Mine)	Long Beach	California
East	2	University of Virginia	University Hall (University of Virginia)	Charlottesville	Virginia
Mideast	1	University of Georgia	Georgia Coliseum (Stegeman Coliseum)	Athens	Georgia
Mideast	1	Rutgers University	Louis Brown Athletic Center	Piscataway	New Jersey
Mideast	1	Old Dominion University	Old Dominion University Fieldhouse	Norfolk	Virginia
Mideast	1	Temple University	McGonigle Hall	Philadelphia	Pennsylvania
Mideast	2	North Carolina State University	Reynolds Coliseum	Raleigh	North Carolina
Mideast	2	University of Mississippi (Ole Miss)	Tad Smith Coliseum	Oxford	Mississippi
Mideast	2	Auburn University	Memorial Coliseum (Beard–Eaves–Memorial Coliseum)	Auburn	Alabama
Mideast	2	Clemson University	Littlejohn Coliseum	Clemson	South Carolina
Midwest	1	University of South Carolina	Carolina Coliseum	Columbia	South Carolina
Midwest	1	Oklahoma State University	Gallagher-Iba Arena	Stillwater	Oklahoma
Midwest	1	Illinois State University	Redbird Arena	Normal	Illinois
Midwest	1 & 2	Purdue University	Mackey Arena	West Lafayette	Indiana
Midwest	2	Louisiana Tech University	Thomas Assembly Center	Ruston	Louisiana
Midwest	2	University of Iowa	Carver–Hawkeye Arena	Iowa City	Iowa
Midwest	2	Stanford University	Maples Pavilion	Stanford	California
West	1	University of Montana	Dahlberg Arena	Missoula	Montana
West	1	University of Washington	Hec Edmundson Pavilion	Seattle	Washington
West	1	University of Nevada, Las Vegas	South Gym	Las Vegas	Nevada
West	1	Bowling Green State University	Anderson Arena	Bowling Green	Ohio
West	2	University of Maryland	Cole Field House	College Park	Maryland
West	2	University of Texas	Frank Erwin Center	Austin	Texas
West	2	University of Colorado	CU Events Center (Coors Events Center)	Boulder	Colorado
West	2	Stephen F. Austin University	William R. Johnson Coliseum	Nacogdoches	Texas

== Regionals and Final Four ==
1989 NCAA regionals and Final Four

The regionals, named for the general location, were held from March 23 to March 25 at these sites:

- East Regional E.A. Diddle Arena, Bowling Green, Kentucky (Host: Western Kentucky University)
- Mideast Regional Memorial Coliseum (Beard–Eaves–Memorial Coliseum), Auburn, Alabama (Host: Auburn University)
- Midwest Regional Thomas Assembly Center, Ruston, Louisiana (Host: Louisiana Tech University)
- West Regional Frank Erwin Center, Austin, Texas (Host: University of Texas)

Each regional winner advanced to the Final Four, held March 31 and April 2 in Tacoma, Washington at the Tacoma Dome, hosted by the University of Washington.

== Bids by state ==
The forty-eight teams came from thirty-one states. Pennsylvania and Tennessee had the most teams with four each. Nineteen states did not have any teams receiving bids.

NCAA Women's basketball Tournament invitations by state 1989

Bids	State	Teams
4	Pennsylvania	La Salle, St. Joseph's, Temple, Villanova
4	Tennessee	Chattanooga, Tennessee, Tennessee Tech, Vanderbilt
3	California	Long Beach St., Stanford, Cal St. Fullerton
3	Louisiana	Louisiana Tech, LSU, Northwestern St.
3	Ohio	Bowling Green, Ohio St., Cincinnati
3	Virginia	James Madison, Old Dominion, Virginia
2	Mississippi	Ole Miss, Southern Miss.
2	South Carolina	South Carolina, Clemson
2	Texas	Texas, Stephen F. Austin
1	Alabama	Auburn
1	Arkansas	Arkansas
1	Colorado	Colorado
1	Connecticut	Connecticut
1	Florida	Miami FL
1	Georgia	Georgia
1	Hawaii	Hawaii
1	Illinois	Illinois St..
1	Indiana	Purdue
1	Iowa	Iowa
1	Kentucky	Western Ky.
1	Maryland	Maryland
1	Massachusetts	Holy Cross
1	Montana	Montana
1	Nevada	UNLV
1	New Jersey	Rutgers
1	North Carolina	North Carolina St.
1	Oklahoma	Oklahoma St.
1	Rhode Island	Providence
1	Utah	Utah
1	Washington	Washington
1	West Virginia	West Virginia

== Brackets ==
First and second-round games played at higher seed except where noted.

=== Mideast regional – Auburn, AL (Beard–Eaves–Memorial Coliseum) ===
First round March 15
8	Temple	90
9	Holy Cross	80
5	Georgia	90
12	Chattanooga	69
7	Rutgers	95
10	Southern Miss	73
6	Old Dominion	66
11	Villanova	41

Second round March 18–19
1	Auburn	88
8	Temple	54
4	Clemson	78
5	Georgia	65
2	North Carolina St.	75
7	Rutgers	73
3	Ole Miss	74
6	Old Dominion	58

Regional semifinals March 23
1	Auburn	71
4	Clemson	60
2	North Carolina St.	63
3	Ole Miss	68

Regional finals March 25
1	Auburn	77
3	Ole Miss	51

=== Midwest regional – Ruston, LA (Thomas Assembly Center) ===
First round March 15
8	Miami (FL)	69
9	at Oklahoma St.	93
5	Purdue	91
12	Arkansas	63
7	Illinois St.	100
10	Northwestern St.	79
6	South Carolina	73
11	Tennessee Tech	77

Second round March 18–19
1	Louisiana Tech	103
9	Oklahoma St.	78
4	LSU	54
5	at Purdue	53
2	Stanford	105
7	Illinois St.	77
3	Iowa	77
11	Tennessee Tech	75

Regional semifinals March 23
1	Louisiana Tech	85
4	LSU	68
2	Stanford	98
3	Iowa	74

Regional finals March 25
1	Louisiana Tech	85
2	Stanford	75

=== East regional – Bowling Green, KY (E.A. Diddle Arena) ===
First round March 15
8	Connecticut	63
9	La Salle	72
5	Western Kentucky	57
12	West Virginia	66
7	Vanderbilt	68
10	at St. Joseph's	82
6	James Madison	94
11	Providence	74

Second round March 18–19
1	Tennessee	91
9	La Salle	61
4	Virginia	81
12	West Virginia	68
2	Long Beach St.	84
10	St. Joseph's	65
3	Ohio St.	81
6	James Madison	66

Regional semifinals March 23
1	Tennessee	80
4	Virginia	47
2	Long Beach St.	89
3	Ohio St.	83

Regional finals March 25
1	Tennessee	94
2	Long Beach St.	80

=== West regional – Austin, Texas (Frank Erwin Center) ===
First round March 15
8	Cincinnati	59
9	at Bowling Green	69
5	Washington	87
12	Hawaii	79
7	Cal St. Fullerton	67
10	at Montana	82
6	UNLV	67
11	Utah	53

Second round March 18–19
1	Maryland	78
9	Bowling Green	65
4	Stephen F. Austin	73
5	Washington	63
2	Texas	83
10	Montana	54
3	Colorado	74
6	UNLV	84

Regional semifinals March 23
1	Maryland	89
4	Stephen F. Austin	54
2	Texas	88
6	UNLV	77

Regional finals March 25
1	Maryland	79
2	Texas	71

=== Final Four – Tacoma, WA (Tacoma Dome) ===
National semifinals March 31
1ME	Auburn	76
1MW	Louisiana Tech	71
1E	Tennessee	77
1W	Maryland	65

National championship April 2
1ME	Auburn	60
1E	Tennessee	76

== Record by conference ==
Nineteen conferences had more than one bid, or at least one win in NCAA Tournament play:

Conference	# of Bids	Record	Win %	Round of 32	Sweet Sixteen	Elite Eight	Final Four	Championship Game
Southeastern	6	13–5	.722	5	4	3	2	2
Atlantic Coast	4	6–4	.600	4	4	1	1	–
Atlantic 10	4	4–4	.500	4	–	–	–	–
Big West	4	4–4	.500	2	2	1	–	–
Big Ten	3	3–3	.500	3	2	–	–	–
Big East	3	0–3	–	–	–	–	–	–
Metro	3	0–3	–	–	–	–	–	–
Pacific-10	2	3–2	.600	2	1	1	–	–
Southwest	2	2–2	.500	1	1	1	–	–
Big Eight	2	1–2	.333	2	–	–	–	–
Metro Atlantic	2	1–2	.333	1	–	–	–	–
Southland	2	1–2	.333	1	1	–	–	–
Sun Belt	2	1–2	.333	1	–	–	–	–
American South	1	3–1	.750	1	1	1	1	–
Big Sky	1	1–1	.500	1	–	–	–	–
Colonial	1	1–1	.500	1	–	–	–	–
Mid-American	1	1–1	.500	1	–	–	–	–
Missouri Valley	1	1–1	.500	1	–	–	–	–
Ohio Valley	1	1–1	.500	1	–	–	–	–

Two conferences went 0-1: High Country, and Southern Conference

== All-Tournament team ==
- Bridgette Gordon, Tennessee
- Sheila Frost, Tennessee
- Vickie Orr, Auburn
- Venus Lacy, Louisiana Tech
- Deanna Tate, Maryland

== Game officials ==
- Sally Bell (semifinal)
- John Morningstar(semifinal)
- Larry Sheppard (semifinal)
- Bill Stokes (semifinal)
- June Corteau (final)
- Patty Broderick (final)

== See also ==
- 1989 NCAA Division I men's basketball tournament
- 1989 NCAA Division II women's basketball tournament
- 1989 NCAA Division III women's basketball tournament
- 1989 NAIA women's basketball tournament
