= 1986 NCAA Division I women's basketball championship game =

Women's basketball championship game

NCAA Division I women's basketball championship game
National championship game
USC Trojans	Texas Longhorns
(31–4)	(33–0)
81	97
Head coach: Linda Sharp	Head coach: Jody Conradt
- AP: 3
- AP: 1
	1st half	2nd half	Total
USC Trojans	35	46	81
Texas Longhorns	45	52	97
- Date: March 30, 1986
- Venue: Rupp Arena, Lexington, Kentucky
- MVP: Clarissa Davis, Texas
- Attendance: 5,662

United States TV coverage
- Network: CBS
- Announcers: Gary Bender (play-by-play) and Mimi Griffin (analyst)

The 1986 NCAA Division I women's basketball championship game was the final game of the 1986 NCAA Division I women's basketball tournament. It determined the champion of the 1985–86 NCAA Division I women's basketball season and was contested by the USC Trojans and the Texas Longhorns. The game was played on March 30, 1986, at Rupp Arena in Lexington, Kentucky. After leading 45–35 at halftime, No. 1 Texas defeated No. 3 USC 97–81 to capture the NCAA national championship, and complete the first unbeaten season in women's NCAA history. Clarissa Davis was named the tournament's Most Outstanding Player.

== Participants ==
=== USC Trojans ===
The Trojans, represented the University of Southern California in Los Angeles, California, were led by head coach Linda Sharp in her 9th season at the school. After a disappointing season that followed back-to-back national championships, the Women of Troy began the season ranked No. 7 in the AP Poll. The team's first loss of the season was at No. 1 Texas. They lost at No. 2 Louisiana Tech a month later, and then lost their only home game to No. X Long Beach State by a single point on January 28. After peaking at No. 2 in the polls as the calendar turned over to 1986, the team finished the regular season at No. 3.

For the third time in four seasons, USC was the top seed in the West region of the NCAA tournament and defeated Montana, No. 16 North Carolina, and No. 4 Louisiana Tech to reach the third Final Four in program history. In the National semifinals, USC easily defeated No. 15 Tennessee, 83–59. After National championships in 1983 and 1984, the 31–4 Trojans entered the matchup with No. 1 and undefeated Texas as the underdog.

=== Texas Longhorns ===
The Longhorns, who represented the University of Texas in Austin, Texas, were led by head coach Jody Conradt, in her 10th season at the school. Texas opened the season ranked No. 1 in the AP poll, a place they remained for the entirety of the season. The team earned ten wins over ranked opponents including a win over No. 4 USC on December 10.

In the NCAA tournament, Texas defeated Missouri, No 19 Oklahoma, and No. 11 Ole Miss to reach the first NCAA Final Four in program history. They won 90–65 over No. 5 Western Kentucky in the national semifinal to reach the national championship game with a 33–0 record.

== Starting lineups ==
USC	Position	Texas
Cynthia Cooper	G	Beverly Williams
Rhonda Windham	G	Kamie Ethridge
Cherie Nelson	C	Annette Smith
Holly Ford	F	Andrea Lloyd
Cheryl Miller	F	Fran Harris

== Game summary ==
CBS

March 30, 1986

No. 3 USC Trojans 81, No. 1 Texas Longhorns 97
Scoring by half: 35–45, 46–52
Pts: Cooper 27; Rebs: Asts:	Pts: Davis 25; Rebs: Asts:

Rupp Arena – Lexington, Kentucky

== Media coverage ==
The game was broadcast on CBS.
