= 1986 Southwest Conference women's basketball tournament =

- Classification: Division I
- Teams: 6
- Site: Moody Coliseum; Dallas, Texas
- Champions: Texas (4th title)
- Winning coach: Jody Conradt (4th title)
- MVP: Beverly Williams (Texas)

1985–86 Southwest Conference women's basketball standings
	Conf.				Overall
Team	W		L	PCT	W		L	PCT
No. 1 Texas†	16	–	0	1.000	34	–	0	1.000
Texas Tech	13	–	3	.813	21	–	9	.700
Arkansas	13	–	3	.813	22	–	8	.733
Houston	9	–	7	.563	19	–	10	.655
Texas A&M	9	–	7	.563	16	–	13	.552
SMU	5	–	11	.313	11	–	20	.355
Baylor	4	–	12	.250	6	–	21	.222
Rice	2	–	14	.125	7	–	19	.269
TCU	1	–	15	.063	5	–	22	.185
† 1986 SWC tournament winner Rankings from AP Poll

The 1986 Southwest Conference women's basketball tournament was held March 5–8, 1986, at Moody Coliseum in Dallas, Texas.

Number 1 seed Texas defeated 2 seed Texas Tech 77–53 to win their fourth championship and receive the conference's automatic bid to the 1986 NCAA tournament.

Texas Tech and Arkansas received at-large bids to the NCAA tournament.

== Format and seeding ==
The tournament consisted of a 6 team single-elimination tournament. The top two seeds had a bye to the Semifinals.

Place	Seed	Team	Conference			Overall		
Place	Seed	Team	W	L	%	W	L	%
1	1	Texas	16	0	1.000	34	0	1.000
2	2	Texas Tech	13	3	.813	21	9	.700
2	3	Arkansas	13	3	.813	22	8	.733
4	4	Houston	9	7	.563	19	10	.655
4	5	Texas A&M	9	7	.563	16	13	.552
6	6	SMU	5	11	.313	11	20	.355
7	-	Baylor	4	12	.250	6	21	.222
8	-	Rice	2	14	.125	7	19	.269
9	-	TCU	1	15	.063	5	22	.185

== Tournament ==
Quarterfinal; Wednesday, March 5
4	Houston	80
5	Texas A&M	73
3	Arkansas	82
6	SMU	75

Semifinals; Thursday, March 6
1	Texas	81
4	Houston	64
2	Texas Tech	54
3	Arkansas	48

Finals; Saturday, March 8
1	Texas	77
2	Texas Tech	53
