= WBCA National Coach of the Year Award =

Basketball coach award

United States Marine Corps/WBCA National Coach of the Year (colleges) Wilson Sporting Goods/WBCA National Coach of the Year (high schools)
- Awarded for: The best women's basketball head coaches in college / high schools
- Country: United States
- Presented by: Women's Basketball Coaches Association
- First award: 1983
- Website: http://www.wbca.org

The United States Marine Corps/WBCA National Coach of the Year is an award given by the Women's Basketball Coaches Association to the best women's basketball Head Coaches in college and high schools since 1983. From 2014, the award is named "The Pat Summitt Trophy" in honor of the legendary University of Tennessee Lady Vols head coach. The WBCA presents an award to the National Coach of the year in each of six divisions:

- NCAA Division I
- NCAA Division II
- NCAA Division III
- NAIA
- Two-Year College
- High School

== Winners ==
| Year | NCAA Division I | NCAA Division II | NCAA Division III | NAIA | Junior college | High school |
|---|---|---|---|---|---|---|
| 1983 | Pat Summitt; Tennessee | Jorja Hoehn; Central Missouri | Wayne Morgan; North Central (IL) | | Lin Laursen; Central Arizona College | |
| 1984 | Jody Conradt; Texas | Linda Makowski; Dayton | A.J. Stoval; Rust | | Penny Slagle; North Dakota–Williston | |
| 1985 | Jim Foster; Saint Joseph's | Jorja Hoehn (2); Central Missouri | Mike Strong; Scranton | Lewis Bivens; Carson–Newman | Ken Hefner; Odessa College | |
| 1986 | Jody Conradt (2); Texas | Brenda Reilly; Central Connecticut | Tim Shea; Salem State | Sylvia Hatchell; Francis Marion | Jerry McCarty; Barton County Community College | |
| 1987 | Theresa Grentz; Rutgers | Nancy Winstel; Northern Kentucky | Linda Wunder; Wisconsin–Stevens Point | Floyd Evans; Wayland Baptist | Linda Hargrove; Cowley County Community College | |
| 1988 | C. Vivian Stringer; Iowa | Darlene May; Cal Poly Pomona | Duane Siverson; Concordia College | Johnny Jacumin; Wingate | Lorene Ramsey; Illinois Central College | |
| 1989 | Tara VanDerveer; Stanford | Jane Williamson; West Georgia | LeAnn Henrich; California State University | Nelson Brownlee; Claflin | Evelyn Blalock; Kilgore College | |
| 1990 | Kay Yow; NC State | Darlene May (2); Cal Poly Pomona | Sue Wise; Hope | Lisa Bluder; St. Ambrose | Evelyn Blalock (2); Kilgore College | Rick Insell; Shelbyville Central High School |
| 1991 | Rene Portland; Penn State | James Sweat; Norfolk State | Donna Newberry; Muskingum | Nelson Brownlee (2); Claflin | Mike Bona; Emmanuel College | Sandra Meadows; Duncanville High School |
| 1992 | Ferne Labati; Miami (FL) | Barbara Stevens; Bentley | Mary Beth Spirk; Moravian | Allison McNeill; Simon Fraser | Royce Chadwick; Howard College | Rick Insell (2); Shelbyvillle Central High School |
| 1993 | C. Vivian Stringer (2); Iowa | Amy Ruley; North Dakota State | Mike Durbin; Saint Benedict | Theresa Check; Central State | Susan Summons; Miami Dade Community College-Kendall | Vincent Cannizzaro; Christ the King High School |
| 1994 | Marsha Sharp; Texas Tech | Paula Sullivan; Stonehill | Dixie Jeffers; Capital | Jon Carey; Western Oregon | Lyndal Worth; Florida Community College | Pat Hewitt; Hartsville High School |
| 1995 | Pat Summitt (2); Tennessee | Jorja Hoehn (3); UC Davis | Dixie Jeffers (2); Capital | Jerry Finkbeiner; Southern Nazarene | Kurt Budke; Trinity Valley Community College | Breezy Bishop; Western High School |
| 1996 | Leon Barmore; Louisiana Tech | Suzanne Fox; Abilene Christian | Kathi Bennett; Wisconsin–Oshkosh | Frank Bennett; Lipscomb | Bill Brock; Grayson County College | Brad Smith; Oregon City High School |
| 1997 | Geno Auriemma; UConn | Bob Schneider; West Texas A&M | Lisa Stone; Wisconsin–Eau Claire | Cindy DeRocher; Tri-State | Gary Ashlock; Central Florida Community College | Brad Smith (2); Oregon City High School |
| 1998 | Pat Summitt (3); Tennessee | Cindy Stein; Emporia State | Pam Ruder; Wisconsin–Oshkosh | Frank Bennett (2); Lipscomb | Lorene Ramsey (2); Illinois Central College | Linda Holt; Butler High School |
| 1999 | Carolyn Peck; Purdue | Barbara Stevens (2); Bentley | Pam Ruder (2); Wisconsin–Oshkosh | Frank Bennett (3); Lipscomb | Lorene Ramsey (3); Illinois Central College | Linda Holt (2); Butler High School |
| 2000 | Geno Auriemma (2); UConn | Nancy Winstel (2); Northern Kentucky | Nancy Fahey; Washington (MO) | Steve Crots; Auburn–Montgomery | Lee Ann Riley; Tyler Junior College | Tom Dineen; Buffalo Grove High School |
| 2001 | Muffet McGraw; Notre Dame | Barbara Stevens (3); Bentley | Nan Carney-DeBord; Ohio Wesleyan | Sharon Baldwin; Life | Jim Littell; Seward County | Jeff Jasper; Pascack Valley High School |
| 2002 | Geno Auriemma (3); UConn | Paul Thomas; Cal Poly Pomona | Kris Huffman; DePauw | Craig Wiginton; Southern Nazarene | Mary Scovel; Gulf Coast Community College | Kathy McGee; Powers Catholic High School |
| 2003 | Gail Goestenkors; Duke | Gordy Presnell; Seattle Pacific | Tonja Englund; Wisconsin–Eau Claire | Bill Watson; Pikeville | Stephanie Smith; Wabash Valley Community College | Joe Lombard; Canyon High School |
| 2004 | Rene Portland (2); Penn State | Gordy Presnell (2); Seattle Pacific | Stefanie Pemper; Bowdoin | Mark Campbell; Union (TN) | Michael Landers; Trinity Valley Community College | Brad Smith (3); Oregon City High School |
| 2005 | Pokey Chatman; LSU | Dawn Plitzuweit; Grand Valley State | Gary Fifield; Southern Maine | Russ Davis; Vanguard | Lin Laursen (2); Central Arizona College | Bob Mackey; Christ the King High School |
| 2006 | Sylvia Hatchell (2); North Carolina | Glenn Wilkes Jr. Rollins | Brian Morehouse; Hope | Marty Rowe; Lee (TN) | Seth Goodman; Monroe College | Kevin Kiernan; Troy High School |
| 2007 | Gail Goestenkors (2); Duke | Steve Harold; Glenville State | Deena Applebury; Mary Washington | Steve Brooks; Indiana Wesleyan | Kim Muhl; Kirkwood Community College | Joy Couch; Dorman High School |
| 2008 | Geno Auriemma (4); UConn | Chad Lavin; South Dakota | Chris Kielsmeier; Howard Payne | Mark Campbell (2); Union (TN) | Lin Laursen (3); Central Arizona College | Andy Zihlman; Bishop Lynch High School |
| 2009 | Geno Auriemma (5); UConn | Todd Starkey; Lenoir–Rhyne | Scott Rueck; George Fox | Russ Davis (2); Vanguard | Ned Mircetic; Ventura College | Linus McGinty; Cardinal O'Hara High School |
| 2010 | Connie Yori; Nebraska | Cleve Wright; Gannon | G.P. Gromacki; Amherst | Nathan Teymer; Southern Polytechnic | Michael Landers (2); Baton Rouge Community College | Jeff Sink; Brea-Olinda High School |
| 2011 | Tara VanDerveer (2); Stanford | Dennis Cox; Clayton State | Nancy Fahey (2); Washington (MO) | Earl Woudstra; Northwestern (IA) | Mark Leszczyk; Roxbury Community College | Rich Castellano; Northport High School |
| 2012 | Kim Mulkey; Baylor | Sue Ramsey; Ashland | Mia Smith; Illinois Wesleyan | Steve Brooks (2); Indiana Wesleyan | B.J. Smith; Highland Community College | Marcia Pinder; Dillard High School |
| 2013 | Muffet McGraw (2); Notre Dame | Barbara Stevens (4); Bentley | Kris Huffman (2); DePauw | George Wilson; Ozarks | Kate Lynch; Community College of Rhode Island | Curtis Ekmark; St. Mary's High School |
| 2014 | Muffet McGraw (3); Notre Dame | Barbara Stevens (5); Bentley | Marc Mitchell; Fairleigh Dickinson–Florham | Russ Davis (3); Vanguard | Trenia Tillis Jones; Tyler Junior College | Cathy Self Morgan; Duncanville High School |
| 2015 | Sue Semrau; Florida State | Lisa Carlsen; Lewis | Carla Berube; Tufts | Dale Neal; Freed–Hardeman | Greg Franklin; Chipola Junior College | Scott Allen; Paul VI Catholic High School |
| 2016 | Geno Auriemma (6); UConn | Steve Gomez; Lubbock Christian | Scott Hemer; SUNY Geneseo | Chris Minner; Our Lady of the Lake | Ben Conrad; Johnson County CC | Tom Gonsalves; St. Mary’s HS (Stockton, CA) |
| 2017 | Geno Auriemma (7); UConn | Robyn Fralick; Ashland | G.P. Gromacki (2); Amherst | Dale Neal (2); Freed–Hardeman | Kim Muhl (2); Kirkwood CC | Rhonda Farney; Georgetown HS (TX) |
| 2018 | Vic Schaefer; Mississippi State | Robyn Fralick (2); Ashland | Bob Amsberry; Wartburg | Drew Olson; Concordia (NE) | Chad Killinger; Moberly CC | Sue Phillips; Archbishop Mitty High School |
| 2019 | Kim Mulkey (2); Baylor | Molly Miller; Drury | Adrienne Shibles; Bowdoin | Jody Martinez; Taylor | Mary Scovel; Gulf Coast State College | Kit Kyle Martin; Timberview HS, Arlington, TX |
| 2020 | Dawn Staley; South Carolina | Molly Miller (2); Drury | Brian Morehouse (2); Hope | Bo Overton; Oklahoma City | Cayla Petree; South Plains College | Terri Bamford; La Jolla Country Day, San Diego |
| 2021 | Wes Moore; North Carolina State | Amy Eagan; Drury | Brian Morehouse (3); Hope | K.C. Basset; Sterling (KS) | James Frey; South Georgia Technical | Hilda Hankerson; Westlake HS (GA) |
| 2022 | Dawn Staley (2); South Carolina | Kim Stephens; Glenville State | Meg Barber; New York | Wes Keller; Rocky Mountain | Brandan Harrell; Georgia Highlands | Alicia Komaki; Sierra Canyon |
| 2023 | Dawn Staley (3); South Carolina | Kari Pickens; Ashland University | Lynn Hersey; Smith College | Ginger Colvin; Campbellsville University | Jeff Allen; Collin College | Melissa Hearlihy; Harvard-Westlake |
| 2024 | Dawn Staley (4); South Carolina | Hana Haden; Georgia Southwestern State University | Juli Fulks; Transylvania University | Ginger Colvin (2); Campbellsville University | Luke Scheidecker; Wabash Valley College | Kevin Kiernan; Mater Dei |
| 2025 | Cori Close; UCLA | Mike Williams; Grand Valley State University | Meg Barber (2); New York | Carlotta Kloppenburg; Southern Oregon University | Chelsea Dewey; Arizona Western College | Rhonda Farney (2); Georgetown HS (TX) |
| 2026 | Shea Ralph; Vanderbilt | Mike Williams (2); Grand Valley State University | Meg Barber (3); New York | Lauren Glenn; Olivet Nazarene University | Russ Jackson; Daytona State College | |

Geno Auriemma is the recipient of the most WBCA awards with seven (1997, 2000, 2002, 2008, 2009, 2016, 2017), all of them while coaching the University of Connecticut.

Sylvia Hatchell is the only coach to receive the award in different categories: NAIA in 1986 with Francis Marion College and NCAA Division I in 2006 with the University of North Carolina.

Besides Hatchell, other two coaches have received the award with different schools: Jorja Hoehn (NCAA Division II) with Central Missouri State University (1983 and 1985) and University of California-Davis (1995), and Michael Landers (JC/CC) with Trinity Valley Community College (2004) and Baton Rouge Community College (2010).

== See also ==
- Women's Basketball Coaches Association
