= C. Vivian Stringer =

American basketball coach

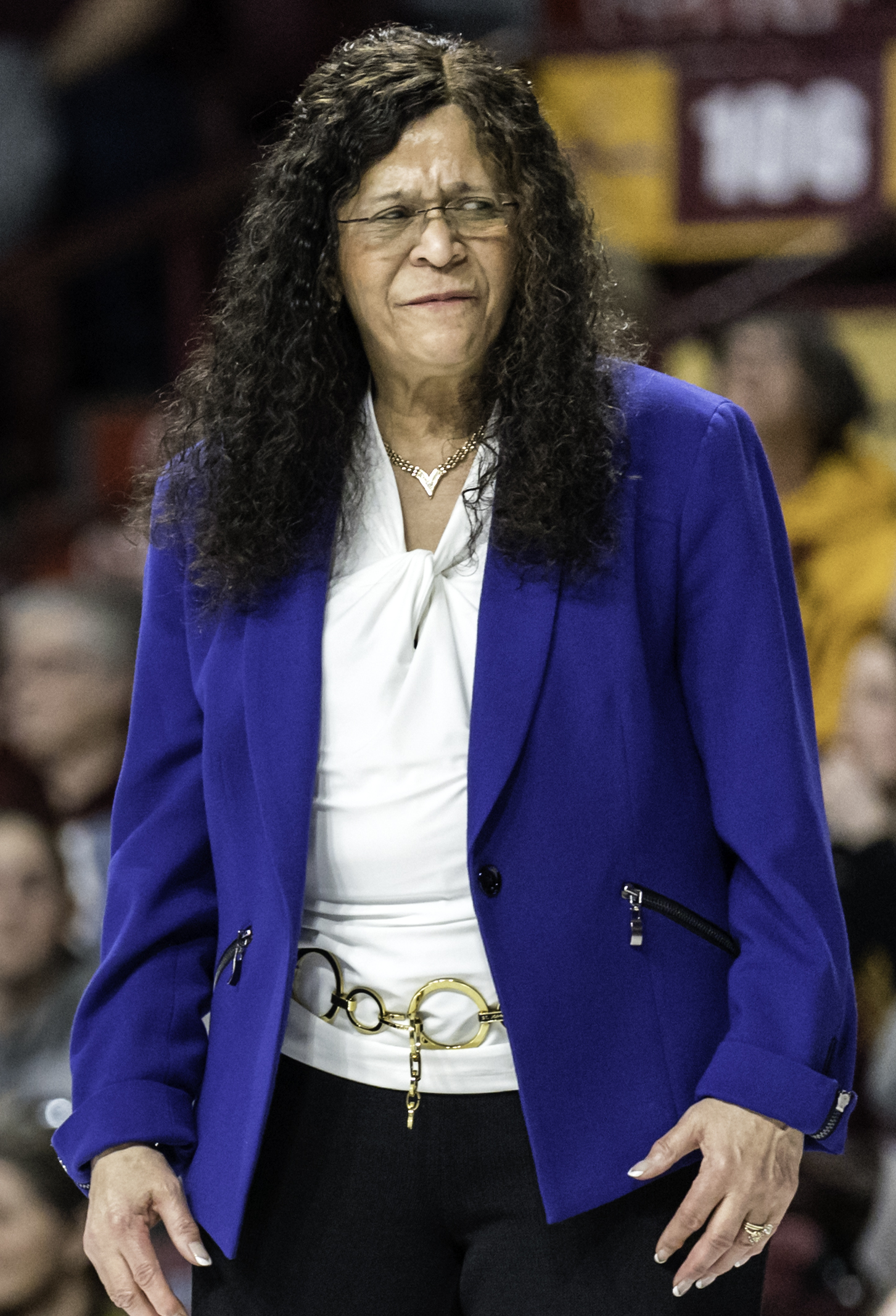
- Stringer in 2020

Biographical details
- Born: March 16, 1948 (age 78); Edenborn, Pennsylvania, U.S.
- Education: Slippery Rock

Coaching career (HC unless noted)
- 1972–1983: Cheyney State
- 1983–1995: Iowa
- 1995–2022: Rutgers

Head coaching record
- Overall: 1055–426 (.712)

Accomplishments and honors

Championships
- 4× NCAA Regional—Final Four (1982, 1993, 2000, 2007); 3× Big East regular season (1999, 2005, 2006); Big East BE7 Division (1998); Big East tournament (2007); 6× Big Ten regular season (1987–1990, 1992, 1993); WNIT (2014)

Awards
- Naismith College Coach of the Year (1993); 2× WBCA National Coach of the Year Award (1988, 1993); NCAA, Wade Trophy National Coach of the Year (1982); 2× Converse National Coach of the Year (1988, 1993); 2× Black Coaches Association Coach of the Year (1993, 1998); Sports Illustrated Coach of the Year (1993); USA Today Coach of the Year (1993); Los Angeles Times Coach of the Year (1993); 2× Big East Coach of the Year (1998, 2005); 2× Big Ten Coach of the Year (1991, 1993)
- Basketball Hall of Fame; Inducted in 2009
- Women's Basketball Hall of Fame
Medal record
Women's basketball
Assistant Coach for United States
Olympic Games
Gold medal – first place	2004 Athens	Team competition
Head Coach for United States
Pan American Games
Bronze medal – third place	1991 Havana	Team competition
Head Coach for United States
World University Games
Silver medal – second place	1985 Kobe	Team competition
Assistant Coach for United States
William Jones Cup
Bronze medal – third place	1980 Taipei	Team competition

Charlaine Vivian Stringer (born March 16, 1948) is an American former basketball coach. She holds one of the best coaching records in the history of women's basketball. She was the head coach of the Rutgers University women's basketball team from 1995 until her retirement in 2022.

Stringer is the first coach in NCAA history to lead three different women's programs to the NCAA Final Four: Rutgers in 2000 and 2007, the University of Iowa in 1993, and Cheyney State College (now Cheyney University of Pennsylvania) in 1982. She is the fifth winningest coach in women's college basketball history. She was honored as the Naismith College Coach of the Year for women's basketball in 1993, and is a member of the Women's Basketball Hall of Fame. She was elected to the Basketball Hall of Fame in April 2009, and was inducted in September of that year. On February 26, 2013, Stringer won her 900th game, becoming only the fourth coach in women's basketball history to reach this mark, joining Pat Summitt, Sylvia Hatchell, and Jody Conradt. She concluded her coaching career with a total of 1,055 victories, ranking her among the winningest coaches in college basketball history.

== Biography ==
Stringer is a native of Edenborn, Pennsylvania, and a member of the Alumni Hall of Fame at her alma mater. In high school she sued her school for not allowing her to be a cheerleader because of her race. She won the case and was given a spot on her school's cheerleading squad, becoming the first black cheerleader in her town since 1955–1958, when Dolores Dantzler was on the team. She is a graduate of Slippery Rock University of Pennsylvania where she was a four-sport athlete, participating in basketball, softball, volleyball, and field hockey. Stringer and her late husband, William D. Stringer, whom she met as a student at Slippery Rock, have three children: David, Janine (Nina), and Justin. She has 5 siblings, Madalin Williams, Richelle Davis, Timothy Stoner, Jack Stoner, and Verna Fraizer.

=== Coaching career ===
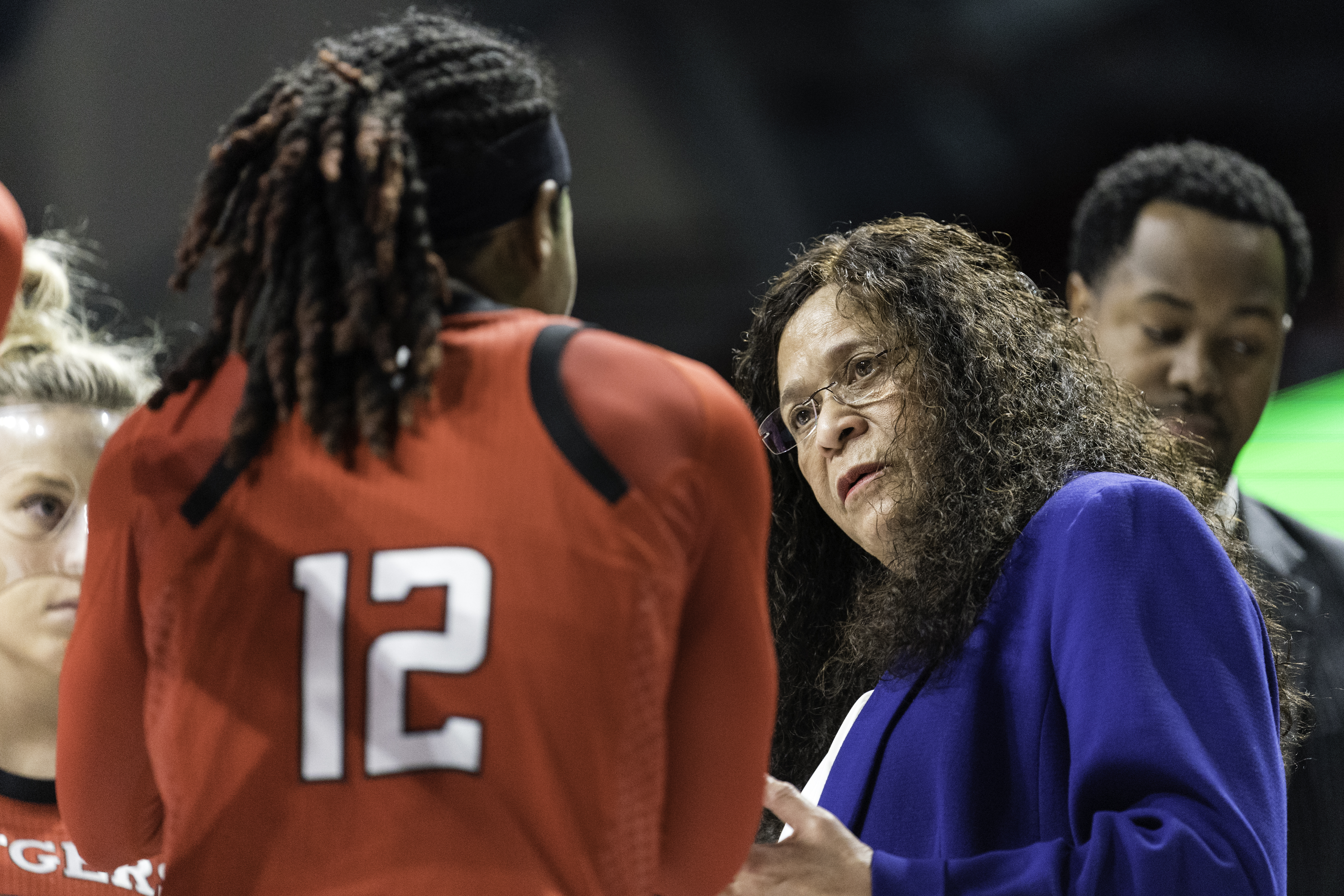
Stringer coaching in 2020

Stringer arrived at Rutgers in July 1995, after 23 years combined as head coach at Cheyney State and the University of Iowa. She stated in her autobiography that a major reason she took the coaching job at Rutgers was that she felt that her children were not learning enough about their culture or comfortable enough around fellow African Americans, due to the state of Iowa being a majority white populated area. In 1998 her team posted its first 20-win season in four years (22–10), winning the Big East title with a 14–4 regular-season record. In the postseason, the Scarlet Knights advanced to the NCAA Tournament's Sweet 16 with a 62–61 win against Iowa State. In 2000, her team went to the Final Four.

In 2007, Rutgers again reached the NCAA Tournament's Final Four after upsetting #1 seed Duke. After the 2007 tournament, Stringer served as spokesperson for the Rutgers team during a media firestorm over a derogatory reference to the team made on the radio and television program Imus in the Morning. The Rutgers players eventually accepted an apology from talk-show host Don Imus. In the wake of the controversy, New York senator and presidential candidate Hillary Clinton also met with Stringer.

In early March 2008, Stringer's autobiography, titled Standing Tall: A Memoir of Tragedy and Triumph, was released through Crown Books.

Also, on February 27, 2008, Stringer became the third women's basketball coach to win 800 career games. She led the Scarlet Knights to the Elite Eight in 2008 where they lost to fellow women's basketball powerhouse, the University of Connecticut.

For the 2008–09 season, five McDonald's All-Americans have been recruited by Stringer to play at Rutgers.

In 2018, she won her 1,000th game as a head coach, which made her the first African-American college basketball coach to win 1,000 games.

=== Awards and honors ===
In recognition of her many accomplishments and service to the game, Stringer was inducted into the Women's Basketball Hall of Fame on June 9, 2001.

She was honored with the degree of Honorary Doctor of Humanities from Howard University on May 10, 2008, the university's 140th commencement address. She was also inducted as an honorary member of Alpha Kappa Alpha sorority on July 15, 2008, during the sorority's Centennial Ball in Washington, DC.

Stringer has been named the National Coach of the Year three times (Wade Trophy, 1982; Converse, 1988; and Naismith, 1993) by her peers. She also was named the 1988 Russell Athletic/WBCA National Coach of the Year, the 1993 Coach of the Year by Sports Illustrated, USA Today, Converse, the Los Angeles Times and the Black Coaches Association; the 2000 Female Coach of the Year by the Rainbow/PUSH Organization, a group founded by Rev. Jesse Jackson; the District V Coach of the Year in 1985, 1988 and 1993; the District I Coach of the Year in 1998; the Big Ten Coach of the Year in 1991 and 1993; the BIG EAST Coach of the Year in 1998 and 2005; and the 1998, 1999, 2000 and 2005 Metropolitan Basketball Writers Association Coach of the Year.

Stringer received the 1993 Carol Eckman Award, which acknowledges the coach most demonstrating spirit, courage, integrity, commitment, leadership and service to the game of women's basketball.

A finalist for the Naismith National Coach-of-the-Year Award five times during her tenure at Rutgers, Stringer was honored by the U.S. Sports Academy when the organization decided to name its annual women's coaching award in her honor. The C. Vivian Stringer Medallion Award of Sport for Women's Coaching was handed out for the first time in July 2002. In 2003, she was recognized by Sports Illustrated as one of the "101 Most Influential Minorities in Sports", and during the summer of 2004 she received the Black Coaches Association's Lifetime Achievement Award.

In addition to her extensive collegiate experience, Stringer also has successfully tested herself in the international arena. An assistant coach for the gold-medal 2004 U.S. Olympic Team, her first USA Basketball experience came as an assistant for the bronze-medal 1980 USA Jones Cup Team. Stringer also has had extensive head-coaching experience in the national program, leading the 1982 U.S. Olympic Festival East Team to a bronze medal, the 1985 U.S. World University Games Team (Kobe, Japan) to a silver, the 1989 U.S. World Championship Qualifying Team (São Paulo, Brazil) to a gold and a qualification for the following year's FIBA World Championship, and the 1991 Pan American Games Team (Havana, Cuba) to a bronze medal.

A noted administrator, Stringer was one of the key players in the development of the Women's Basketball Coaches Association. She served as a voting member of the WBCA Board of Directors, the Amateur Basketball Association of the United States and the Nike Coaches Advisory Board. In the past, Stringer has served as a member of the Kodak All-America Selection Committee and was elected to the Women's Sports Foundation Advisory Board.

In 2006, she was inducted into the International Women's Sports Hall of Fame.

The C. Vivian Stringer Child Development Center was dedicated on Tuesday, September 9, 2008. The ceremony took place at Nike World Headquarters on the Nike campus in Beaverton, Oregon. The Stringer Center, a 35,000-square-foot (3,300 m^{2}) facility, opened in June 2008. The center houses 26 classrooms, providing care, learning and development for approximately 300 children between the ages of six months and five years old. The Nike campus buildings pay tribute to some of the world's best athletes and coaches. Some of the athletes honored include John McEnroe, Joan Benoit Samuelson, Michael Jordan, Mike Schmidt, Nolan Ryan, Lance Armstrong, Mia Hamm, Ken Griffey Jr., Pete Sampras, Jerry Rice and Tiger Woods. Stringer is the third woman, the second coach, and the first African-American woman to have a building named after her on Nike's campus.

On April 6, 2009, it was officially announced that she has been inducted to the Hall of Fame with Michael Jordan, John Stockton, David Robinson and long-time Utah Jazz coach Jerry Sloan. The 2009 inductees were officially enshrined to the Basketball Hall of Fame on September 11, 2009, in Springfield, Massachusetts.

On October 19, 2022, the Rutgers Scarlet Knights announced the renaming of the court inside the basketball stadium in Piscataway, NJ in honor of Coach Stringer.

== USA Basketball ==
Stringer was chosen as the assistant coach of the team representing the US in 1980 at the William Jones Cup competition in Taipei, Taiwan. The team started out strong, winning their first three games. Then they faced the Republic of China – Blue team, who beat the USA 86–81. They won their next four games, including a close match against the undefeated Republic of China – White team, which they won 84–82, and a rematch against the Blue team, which they won 66–62. With a 4–0 record in medal round play, they simply had to beat their last opponent, South Korea, who had a 3–1 record, to win the gold. However, South Korea won the game 90–79. The Republic of China – White also won, leaving three teams tied with 4–1 records. The tie-breaker was point differential, and this left the USA team with the bronze medal. Mary Ostrowski and Valerie Still made the All-Tournament Team.

Stringer was named the head coach of the team representing the US at the World University Games held in Kobe, Japan in July 1985. The team won their three preliminary games with ease, beating the People's Republic of Korea, Yugoslavia and Great Britain by more than 25 points each. Their next game, against China, was much closer, but the USA team had balanced scoring, with five players in double figures for points, and won 83–78. The USA team played Canada in the semifinal, and again had five players with double-digit scoring, winning 85–61 to advance to the gold medal game against the USSR. The USA fell behind by as much as 18 points in the second half. They attempted a comeback, and cut the margin, but the USSR hit almost 55% of their shots and went on to claim the gold medal 87–81. The USA received the silver medal. Katrina McClain was the leading scorer and rebounder for the USA team with 17.3 points and 7.7 rebounds per game.

== Film: This Is a Game, Ladies ==
Stringer and the entire Rutgers team were the subject of the 2004 documentary: This Is a Game, Ladies that followed the team during the 2000–01 season. The film was by directed by Peter Schnall and aired on PBS.

== Head coaching record ==
Record table
Season	Team	Overall	Conference	Standing	Postseason
Cheyney State Wolves (Association of Intercollegiate Athletics for Women) (1971–1981)
1971–72	Cheyney State	18–5			
1972–73	Cheyney State	18–5			
1973–74	Cheyney State	18–5			
1974–75	Cheyney State	18–4			
1975–76	Cheyney State	18–4			
1976–77	Cheyney State	18–4			
1977–78	Cheyney State	18–4			
1978–79	Cheyney State	18–4			
1979–80	Cheyney State	25–5			AIAW Division I First Round
1980–81	Cheyney State	27–5			AIAW Division I Quarterfinals
Cheyney State Wolves (NCAA Division I independent) (1981–1983)
1981–82	Cheyney State	28–3			NCAA Division I Runner-up
1982–83	Cheyney State	27–3			NCAA Division I Sweet 16
Cheyney State:		251–51 (.831)			
Iowa Hawkeyes (Big Ten Conference) (1983–1995)
1983–84	Iowa	17–10	11–7	T–3rd	
1984–85	Iowa	20–8	14–4	2nd	
1985–86	Iowa	22–7	15–3	3rd	NCAA Division I Second Round
1986–87	Iowa	26–5	17–1	T–1st	NCAA Division I Elite Eight
1987–88	Iowa	29–2	17–1	1st	NCAA Division I Elite Eight
1988–89	Iowa	27–5	16–2	T–1st	NCAA Division I Sweet 16
1989–90	Iowa	23–6	15–3	T–1st	NCAA Division I Second Round
1990–91	Iowa	21–9	13–5	T–2nd	NCAA Division I Second Round
1991–92	Iowa	25–4	16–2	1st	NCAA Division I Second Round
1992–93	Iowa	27–4	16–2	T–1st	NCAA Division I Final Four
1993–94	Iowa	21–7	13–5	3rd	NCAA Division I Second Round
1994–95	Iowa	11–17	6–10	9th	
Iowa:		269–84 (.762)	169–45 (.790)		
Rutgers Scarlet Knights (Big East Conference) (1995–2013)
1995–96	Rutgers	13–15	8–10	5th (BE7)	
1996–97	Rutgers	11–17	8–10	T–2nd (BE7)	
1997–98	Rutgers	22–10	14–4	1st (BE7)	NCAA Division I Sweet 16
1998–99	Rutgers	29–6	17–1	T–1st	NCAA Division I Elite Eight
1999–2000	Rutgers	26–8	12–4	T–3rd	NCAA Division I Final Four
2000–01	Rutgers	23–8	13–3	3rd	NCAA Division I Second Round
2001–02	Rutgers	9–20	5–11	11th	
2002–03	Rutgers	21–8	13–3	2nd	NCAA Division I Second Round
2003–04	Rutgers	21–12	10–6	T–6th	NCAA Division I First Round
2004–05	Rutgers	28–7	14–2	1st	NCAA Division I Elite Eight
2005–06	Rutgers	27–5	16–0	1st	NCAA Division I Sweet 16
2006–07	Rutgers	27–9	12–4	T–2nd	NCAA Division I Runner-up
2007–08	Rutgers	27–7	14–2	3rd	NCAA Division I Elite Eight
2008–09	Rutgers	21–13	9–7	7th	NCAA Division I Sweet 16
2009–10	Rutgers	18–15	9–7	T–6th	NCAA Division I First Round
2010–11	Rutgers	20–13	11–5	4th	NCAA Division I Second Round
2011–12	Rutgers	22–10	10–6	6th	NCAA Division I First Round
2012–13	Rutgers	16–14	7–9	T–9th	
Rutgers Scarlet Knights (American Athletic Conference) (2013–2014)
2013–14	Rutgers	28–9	12–6	4th	WNIT Champions
Rutgers Scarlet Knights (Big Ten Conference) (2014–2022)
2014–15	Rutgers	23–10	12–6	T–4th	NCAA Division I Second Round
2015–16	Rutgers	19–15	7–9	T–9th	WNIT Second Round
2016–17	Rutgers	6–24	3–13	T–11th	
2017–18	Rutgers	20–12	7–9	T–9th	
2018–19	Rutgers	22–10	13–5	3rd	NCAA Division I First Round
2019–20	Rutgers	22–9	11–7	T–5th	Canceled due to COVID-19
2020–21	Rutgers	14–5	10–3	3rd	NCAA Division I First Round
2021–22	Rutgers	11–20	3–14	13th	
Rutgers:		535–291 (.648)	277–152 (.646)		
Total:		1055–426 (.712)			
National champion Postseason invitational champion Conference regular season champion Conference regular season and conference tournament champion Division regular season champion Division regular season and conference tournament champion Conference tournament champion

== See also ==
- List of college women's basketball career coaching wins leaders
