= List of Texas Longhorns women's basketball coaches =

The Texas Longhorns women's basketball program is a college basketball team that represents the University of Texas in the Big 12 Conference in the National Collegiate Athletic Association. The team has seen 5 individuals hold the head coach position since its inception in 1974. The current head coach is Vic Schaefer, who led his first season in 2020.

Over the history of the Texas basketball program, only 1 coach has been enshrined in the Naismith Memorial Basketball Hall of Fame. The all-time wins leader is Jody Conradt, having won 783 games over her 31-year tenure at the University of Texas.

== Key ==
General
#	Number of coaches (Note: A running total of the number of head coaches.)
**GC**	Games coached
†	Elected to the Naismith Memorial Basketball Hall of Fame
‡	Elected to the Women's Basketball Hall of Fame

Overall
**OW**	Wins
**OL**	Losses
**O%**	Winning percentage

Conference (Note: The Longhorns played as part of the Southern Intercollegiate Athletic Association from their first years until joining the Texas Intercollegiate Athletic Association in 1907. Texas led the creation of the Southwest Conference in 1915, which became the Big 12 Conference after a merger in 1997.)
**CW**	Wins
**CL**	Losses
**C%**	Winning percentage

NCAA Tournament (Note: Postseason play involving the NCAA Division I men's basketball tournament.)
**TA**	Total Appearances (Note: NCAA Division I men's basketball tournament appearances since the tournament began in 1939.)
**TW**	Total Wins
**TL**	Total Losses

Championships
**NC**	National Championships
**CC**	Conference regular season
**CT**	Conference tournament

Bold= Leader in each category

== Coaches ==
List of head basketball coaches showing season(s) coached, overall records, conference records, NCAA Tournament records, championships and selected awards.*Statistics correct as of March 29, 2025.
#	Name	Term	GC	OW	OL	O%	CW	CL	C%	TA	TW	TL	CCs	CTs	NCs
1	Rod Page	1974–1976	55	38	17	.691	—	—	—	—	—	—	—	—	—
2	Jody Conradt †‡	1976–2007	**1,028**	**783**	**245**	.762	**297**	**85**	**.777**	**21**	**31**	**20**	**12**	**10**	**1**
3	Gail Goestenkors‡	2007–2012	166	102	64	.614	40	42	.488	5	1	5	—	—	—
4	Karen Aston	2012–2020	267	184	83	.689	93	51	.646	6	10	6	—	—	—
5	Vic Schaefer	2020–present	179	144	35	**.804**	67	21	.761	5	14	3	2	2	—

NCAA Tournament
	Coach	Appearances
National Championships	Jody Conradt	1
Final Four	Jody Conradt	3
Final Four	Vic Schaefer	1
Elite Eight	Jody Conradt	8
Elite Eight	Vic Schaefer	4
Elite Eight	Karen Aston	1
Sweet Sixteen	Jody Conradt	11
Sweet Sixteen	Karen Aston	4
Sweet Sixteen	Vic Schaefer	4
