= Hankerson =

Hankerson is a surname. Notable people with the surname include:

- Anthony Hankerson (born 2004), American football player
- Barry Hankerson (born 1947), American record producer
- Hilda M. Hankerson (born 1956), American basketball coach
- Kameron Hankerson (born 1998), American basketball player
- Leonard Hankerson (born 1989), American football player
