= 1985–86 Iowa Hawkeyes women's basketball team =

Intercollegiate basketball season

1985–86 Iowa Hawkeyes women's basketball

NCAA tournament
- Conference: Big Ten Conference

Ranking
- Coaches: No. 19
- AP: No. 14
- Record: 22–7 (15–3 Big Ten)
- Head coach: C. Vivian Stringer (3rd season)
- Home arena: Carver–Hawkeye Arena

1985–86 Big Ten women's basketball standings
	Conf.				Overall
Team	W		L	PCT	W		L	PCT
No. 12 Ohio State	16	–	2	.889	23	–	7	.767
No. 14 Iowa	15	–	3	.833	22	–	7	.759
Illinois	12	–	6	.667	20	–	10	.667
Indiana	10	–	8	.556	17	–	11	.607
Purdue	9	–	9	.500	16	–	11	.593
Michigan State	9	–	9	.500	15	–	12	.556
Michigan	8	–	10	.444	14	–	14	.500
Northwestern	6	–	12	.333	16	–	12	.571
Minnesota	4	–	14	.222	8	–	20	.286
Wisconsin	1	–	17	.056	4	–	24	.143
Rankings from AP Poll

The 1985–86 Iowa Hawkeyes women's basketball team represented the University of Iowa as members of the Big Ten Conference during the 1985–86 NCAA women's basketball season. The Hawkeyes, led by third-year head coach C. Vivian Stringer, played their home games in Iowa City, Iowa at Carver–Hawkeye Arena. They finished the season 22–7 overall, 15–3 in Big Ten play, to finish second in the conference standings. The team was the first Iowa Hawkeyes women's basketball team to advance to the women's NCAA basketball tournament.

== Roster ==
1985–86 Iowa Hawkeyes women's basketball team
Players
Coaches

Pos.	#	Name	Height	Year	Previous school	Hometown
F	14	Lynn Kennedy	—	Jr		Irvington, NJ
G	23	Tricia Blair	—	Jr		McFarland, WI
F	24	Lisa Long	—	Jr		Newark, NJ
G	30	Michelle Edwards	5 ft 9 in (1.75 m)	So	Cathedral	Boston, MA
C	44	Marva Fuller	6 ft 5 in (1.96 m)	So	Holly	Holly, MI

Head coach

- C. Vivian Stringer

Assistant coach(es)

- Jennifer Bednarek
- Marianna Freeman

Legend

- (C) Team captain
- (S) Suspended
- (I) Ineligible
- (W) Walk-on
- Injured
- Current redshirt

Roster

== Schedule and results ==
Date time, TV	Rank^{#}	Opponent^{#}	Result	Record	Site city, state
Regular season
Mar 8, 1986	No. 13	at Purdue	W 80–63	22–6 (15–3)	Mackey Arena; West Lafayette, Indiana
NCAA tournament
Mar 16, 1986*	(5 ME) No. 14	at (4 ME) No. 15 Tennessee; Second round	L 68–73	22–7	Stokely Athletic Center; Knoxville, Tennessee
*Non-conference game. ^{#}Rankings from AP Poll. (#) Tournament seedings in parentheses. ME=Mideast.
