= 1985–86 Texas Longhorns women's basketball team =

Intercollegiate basketball season

1985–86 Texas Longhorns women's basketball

NCAA tournament National Champions SWC Champion SWC tournament champion

Texas Classic Champion Orange Bowl Invitational Champion
- Conference: Southwest Conference

Ranking
- Coaches: No. 1
- AP: No. 1
- Record: 34–0 (16–0 SWC)
- Head coach: Jody Conradt (10th season)
- Assistant coaches: Jill Rankin; Lynn Pool; Colleen Matsuhara
- Home arena: Frank Erwin Center

1985–86 Southwest Conference women's basketball standings
	Conf.				Overall
Team	W		L	PCT	W		L	PCT
No. 1 Texas†	16	–	0	1.000	34	–	0	1.000
Texas Tech	13	–	3	.813	21	–	9	.700
Arkansas	13	–	3	.813	22	–	8	.733
Houston	9	–	7	.563	19	–	10	.655
Texas A&M	9	–	7	.563	16	–	13	.552
SMU	5	–	11	.313	11	–	20	.355
Baylor	4	–	12	.250	6	–	21	.222
Rice	2	–	14	.125	7	–	19	.269
TCU	1	–	15	.063	5	–	22	.185
† 1986 SWC tournament winner Rankings from AP Poll

The 1985–86 Texas Longhorns women's basketball team represented the University of Texas at Austin in the 1985–86 college basketball season. It was head coach Jody Conradt's tenth season at Texas. The Longhorns were members of the Southwest Conference and played their home games at the Frank Erwin Center. They finished the season a perfect 34–0, 16–0 in SWC play to win the regular season and SWC tournament. They received an automatic bid to the NCAA women's basketball tournament where they defeated USC to win their first National Championship.

== National championship ==
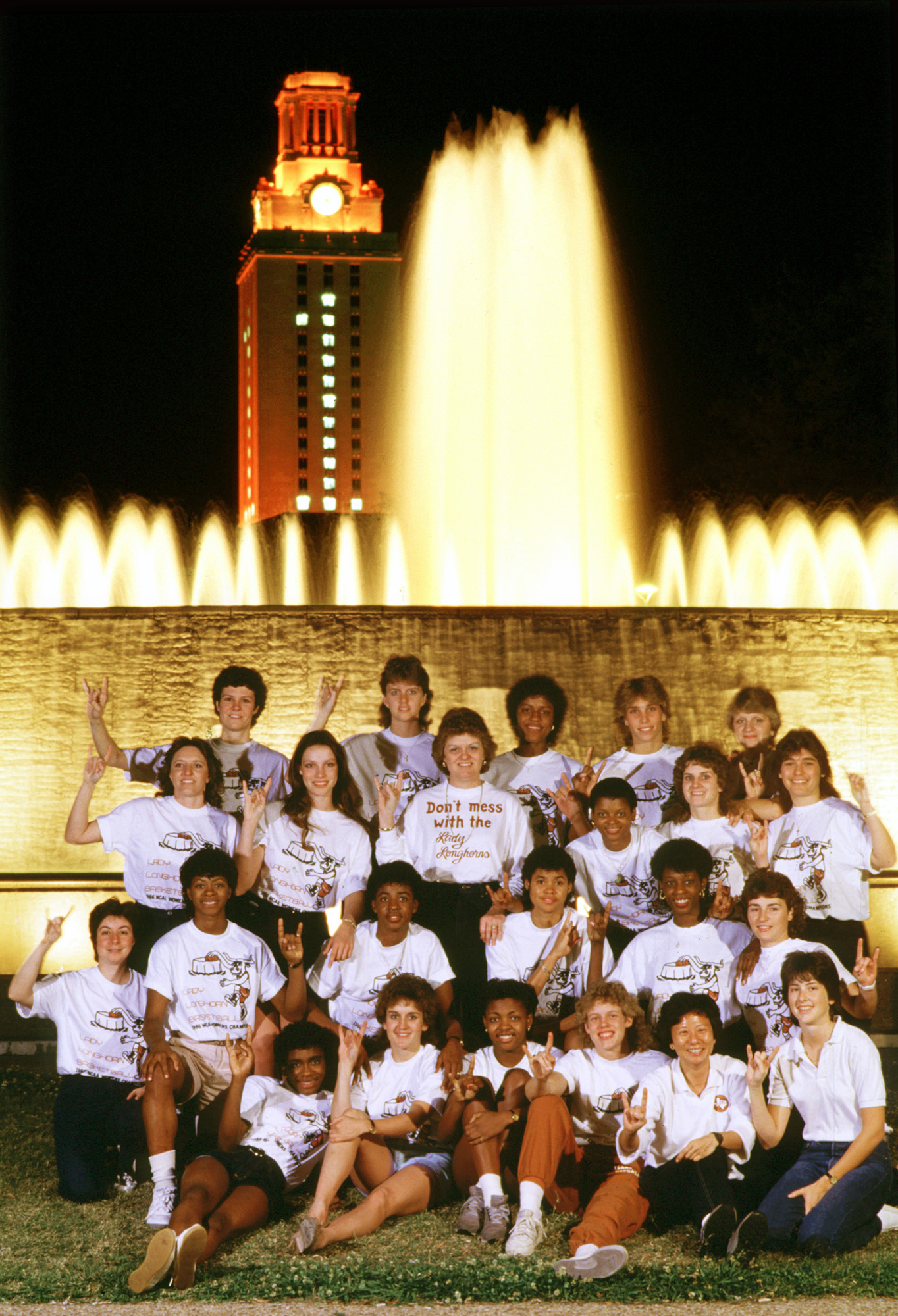
The Texas team, in front of the main tower, lit up with #1

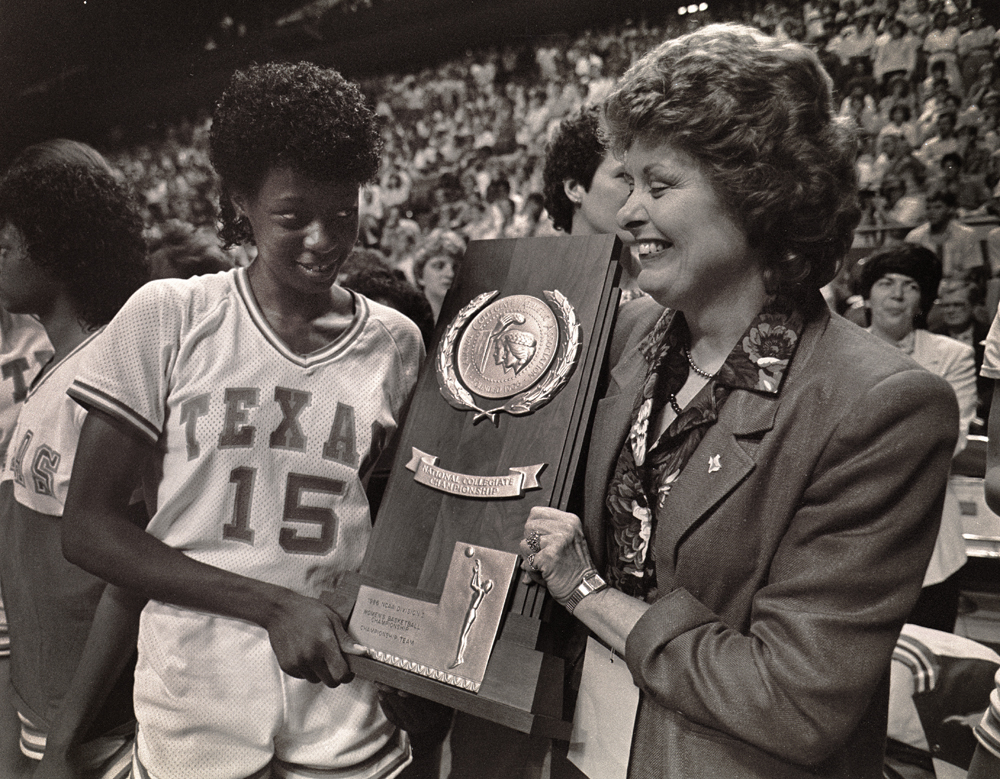
Annette Smith and Jody Conradt with the National Championship trophy

After earning a number one national ranking in 1984, but stumbling in the regional's finals to national power Louisiana Tech, Texas seemed poised for a better result in 1985. Not only did the team earn another top national ranking, but they entered the NCAA tournament knowing that if they reached the Final Four, they would have the home court advantage with the final games scheduled for their own Frank Erwin Center. Home court would play a part, but not the part hoped for by the Longhorns. In the regional semi-finals, played at the home court of Western Kentucky University, the Hilltoppers stymied the Longhorn's hopes with a 92–90 victory. They would return to the 1986 tournament viewed as one of the top teams in the nation and were once again ranked the top team in the nation, but they still did not have a Final Four NCAA appearance on their resume.

The Texas team won their first game easily, then continued to the regional, this time on their home court. They dispatched Oklahoma easily, then struggled against Mississippi, who were trying to prevent the team from a Final Four yet again. This time, Texas prevailed and beat Mississippi by three points to head to their first NCAA Final Four. Their opponent in the semifinal was none other than Western Kentucky, who had denied them the previous year. This time, the result would be very different, as the Longhorns beat Western Kentucky easily, 90–65.

The other semifinal pitted Tennessee against Southern California. Cheryl Miller was the best player at USC, and had led the team to the national championship in 1984. Miller went on to play for the USA national team and helped the USA win the gold medal at the 1984 Olympics. 1986 was Miller's senior year at USC. The game between Tennessee and USC was a rematch of a physical game played in December, in which Miller was thrown out of the game for an elbow. The game was close, but USC ended up with an 85–77 win. In the rematch, Miller would again come out of the game, but under very different circumstances. She was worried about getting hurt, and with a 70–51 lead, didn't need to stay in. In that game, USC won by 24 points, 83–59.

That set up the championship game between USC and undefeated Texas. The Texas team was very deep but had suffered a number of injuries during the year. The game was close early with the Trojans leading at times in the first half, but Texas went on a 10–2 run to take a seven-point lead. Miller would have one of the worst games in her career. Although she scored 16 points, twelve of those were from the free throw line. She was only 2 for 11 from the field, without a single point in the second half. In contrast, Texas' Clarissa Davis came off the bench to score 25 and earn Most Outstanding Player honors. USC's Cynthia Cooper scored 27 points, and Texas won the national championship 97–81 to complete the first undefeated season in NCAA history.

== Roster ==
1985–86 Texas Longhorns women's basketball team
Players
Coaches

Pos.	#	Name	Height	Year	Previous school	Hometown
G	10	Beverly Williams	5 ft 8 in (1.73 m)	So	Del Valle	Austin, TX
G	11	Audrey Smith	5 ft 7 in (1.7 m)	Sr	Bay City	Bay City, TX
C	15	Annette Smith	5 ft 11 in (1.8 m)	Sr	Bay City	Bay City, TX
F	20	Fran Harris	6 ft 0 in (1.83 m)	Sr	South Oak Cliff	Dallas, TX
G	21	Paulette Moegle	5 ft 10 in (1.78 m)	So	San Marcos	San Marcos, TX
F/C	22	Gay Hemphill	5 ft 11 in (1.8 m)	Sr	Plainview	Plainview, TX
F/C	24	Clarissa Davis	6 ft 1 in (1.85 m)	Fr	John Jay	San Antonio, TX
F	25	Andrea Lloyd	6 ft 2 in (1.88 m)	Jr	Moscow	Moscow, ID
F	32	C.J. Jones	6 ft 1 in (1.85 m)	So	Rancho	Las Vegas, NV
G	33	Kamie Ethridge	5 ft 5 in (1.65 m)	Sr	Monterey	Lubbock, TX
G/F	34	Yulonda Wimbish	5 ft 9 in (1.75 m)	So	Victoria	Victoria, TX
C	44	Cara Priddy	6 ft 2 in (1.88 m)	Sr	Central	Las Vegas, NM
C	45	Michele Eglinger	6 ft 4 in (1.93 m)	So	Scarborough	Houston, TX
F	50	Wanda Gardner	5 ft 10 in (1.78 m)	Fr	Desoto	Desoto, TX

Head coach

Jody Conradt

Assistant coach(es)

Jill Rankin
Lynn Pool
Colleen Matsuhara
Volunteer Assistant Coach
Jamie Smith
Student Assistant Coach
Kriss Ethridge

Legend

- (C) Team captain
- (S) Suspended
- (I) Ineligible
- (W) Walk-on
- Injured
- Current redshirt

Roster

== Schedule ==
Date time, TV	Rank^{#}	Opponent^{#}	Result	Record	Site (attendance) city, state
Regular season
Friday, November 29, 1985*	No. 1	at No. 10 Ohio State	W 78–76	1–0	St. John Arena (4,281); Columbus, OH
Sunday, December 1, 1985*	No. 1	at No. 9 Tennessee	W 74-52	2-0	Stokely Athletic Center (3,031); Knoxville, TN
Sunday, October 6, 1985*	No. 1	Western Michigan; Texas Classic	W 92-65	3-0	Frank Erwin Center (2,456); Austin, TX
Saturday, December 7, 1985*	No. 1	No. 3 Louisiana-Monroe; Texas Classic	W 68-54	4-0	Frank Erwin Center (4,639); Austin, TX
Tuesday, December 10, 1985*	No. 1	No. 4 USC	W 94-78	5-0	Frank Erwin Center (11,470); Austin, TX
Sunday, December 29, 1985*	No. 1	vs. Rutgers; Orange Bowl Invitational	W 81-63	6-0	(650); Coral Gables, FL
Monday, December 30, 1985*	No. 1	vs. No. 8 Mississippi; Orange Bowl Invitational	W 57-46	7-0	(596); Coral Gables, FL
Tuesday, December 31, 1985*	No. 1	vs. No. 7 Louisiana-Monroe; Orange Bowl Invitational	W 70-65	8-0	(744); Coral Gables, FL
Thursday, January 2, 1986	No. 1	at No. 20 Houston	W 92-66	9-0 (1-0)	Hofheinz Pavilion (3,100); Houston, TX
Saturday, January 4, 1986	No. 1	at Rice	W 70-38	10-0 (2-0)	Tudor Fieldhouse (1,016); Houston, TX
Tuesday, January 7, 1986	No. 1	Arkansas	W 75-44	11-0 (3-0)	Frank Erwin Center (3,426); Houston, TX
Saturday, January 11, 1986	No. 1	Baylor	W 93-40	12-0 (4-0)	Frank Erwin Center (3,253); Austin, TX
Tuesday, January 14, 1986	No. 1	at Texas A&M	W 73-59	13-0 (5-0)	G. Rollie White Coliseum (1,150); College Station, TX
Saturday, January 18, 1986	No. 1	at SMU	W 96-58	14-0 (6-0)	Moody Coliseum (2,500); Dallas, TX
Monday, January 20, 1986*	No. 1	Old Dominion	W 93-62	15-0	Frank Erwin Center (5,517); Dallas, TX
Wednesday, January 22, 1986	No. 1	TCU	W 95-42	16-0 (7-0)	Frank Erwin Center (2,388); Austin, TX
Friday, January 24, 1986*	No. 1	at BYU	W 111-78	17-0	Marriott Center (1,578); Provo, UT
Tuesday, January 28, 1986	No. 1	at Texas Tech	W 64-57	18-0 (8-0)	Lubbock Municipal Coliseum (5,005); Lubbock, TX
Saturday, February 1, 1986	No. 1	Houston	W 87-60	19-0 (9-0)	Frank Erwin Center (4,084); Lubbock, TX
Wednesday, February 5, 1986	No. 1	Rice	W 78-46	20-0 (10-0)	Frank Erwin Center (1,346); Austin, TX
Saturday, February 8, 1986	No. 1	at Arkansas	W 75-57	21-0 (11-0)	Barnhill Arena (6,008); Fayetteville, AR
Wednesday, February 12, 1986	No. 1	at Baylor	W 77-45	22-0 (12-0)	Heart O' Texas Fair Complex (662); Waco, TX
Saturday, February 15, 1986	No. 1	Texas A&M	W 77-64	23-0 (13-0)	Frank Erwin Center (4,209); Waco, TX
Monday, February 17, 1986*	No. 1	Miami	W 112-43	24-0	Frank Erwin Center (3,430); Austin, TX
Wednesday, February 19, 1986	No. 1	SMU	W 105-48	25-0 (14-0)	Frank Erwin Center (1,498); Austin, TX
Saturday, February 22, 1986	No. 1	at TCU	W 105-44	26-0 (15-0)	Daniel–Meyer Coliseum (563); Fort Worth, TX
Sunday, March 2, 1986	No. 1	Texas Tech	W 55-43	27-0 (16-0)	Frank Erwin Center (3,735); Fort Worth, TX
SWC women's tournament
Thursday, March 6, 1986	(1) No. 1	vs. (4) Houston; SWC Semifinal	W 81-64	28-0	Moody Coliseum (2,011); Austin, TX
Saturday, March 8, 1986	(1) No. 1	vs. (2) Texas Tech; SWC Final	W 77-53	29-0	Moody Coliseum (4,782); Dallas, TX
NCAA women's tournament
Friday, March 14, 1986*	(1 MW) No. 1	(9 MW) Missouri; NCAA second round	W 108-67	30-0	Frank Erwin Center (4,995); Dallas, TX
Thursday, March 20, 1986*	(1 MW) No. 1	(4 MW) No. 19 Oklahoma; NCAA regional semifinal	W 85-59	31-0	Frank Erwin Center (7,474); Austin, TX
Saturday, March 22, 1986*	(1 MW) No. 1	(2 MW) No. 11 Mississippi; NCAA Regional final	W 66-63	32-0	Frank Erwin Center (10,064); Austin, TX
Friday, March 28, 1986*	(1 MW) No. 1	vs. (4 E) No. 5 Western Kentucky; NCAA Semifinal	W 90-65	33-0	Rupp Arena (8,000); Lexington, KY
Sunday, March 30, 1986*	(1 MW) No. 1	vs. (1 W) No. 3 USC; NCAA Final	W 97-81	34-0	Rupp Arena (5,662); Lexington, KY
*Non-conference game. ^{#}Rankings from AP Poll. (#) Tournament seedings in parentheses. MW=Midwest.

== Rankings ==
Regular season Polls
Poll	Pre- Season	Week 2	Week 3	Week 4	Week 5	Week 6	Week 7	Week 8	Week 9	Week 10	Week 11	Week 12	Week 13	Week 14	Week 15	Final
AP	1	1	1	1	1	1	1	1	1	1	1	1	1	1	1	N/A
Coaches	1	1	1	1	1	1	1	1	1	1	1	1	1	1	1	1

Legend
	Increase in ranking
	Decrease in ranking
	Not ranked previous week
(RV)	Received Votes

== See also ==
- Texas Longhorns women's basketball
