= 1985–86 USC Trojans women's basketball team =

Intercollegiate basketball season

1985–86 USC Trojans women's basketball

Pac-West champions

NCAA tournament, Runner-up
- Conference: Pacific West Conference

Ranking
- Coaches: No. 2
- AP: No. 3
- Record: 31–5 (8–0 Pac-West)
- Head coach: Linda Sharp (9th season)
- Home arena: L.A. Sports Arena

1985–86 Pacific West Conference women's basketball standings
	Conf.				Overall
Team	W		L	PCT	W		L	PCT
No. 3 USC	8	–	0	1.000	31	–	5	.861
Arizona	4	–	4	.500	19	–	9	.679
Arizona State	4	–	4	.500	15	–	10	.600
UCLA	3	–	5	.375	12	–	16	.429
Stanford	1	–	7	.125	13	–	15	.464
As of March 31, 1986; Rankings from AP Poll

The 1985–86 USC Trojans women's basketball team represented the University of Southern California during the 1985–86 NCAA Division I women's basketball season. The squad was led by ninth-year head coach Linda Sharp and superstar Cheryl Miller. The Trojans played their home games at the L.A. Sports Arena and were members of the Pacific West Conference.

The Women of Troy finished the regular season with a 27–4 record (8–0 WCAA) and the No. 3 ranking in the AP poll. As the top seed in the West region of the NCAA tournament, USC played the entire regional near their home city of Los Angeles. The team defeated Montana, North Carolina, and Louisiana Tech to earn the school's third Final Four appearance. In the national semifinals, USC easily defeated Tennessee, 83–59. In the National Championship Game, the Trojans played No. 1 and unbeaten Texas. The Longhorns were too much for USC as they won the title by a score of 97–81 to secure the program's first NCAA title.

Miller capped her career with over 3,000 points, multiple player of the year awards, and two national championships, and remains one of the most decorated women's college basketball players of all time. Her number 31 jersey was the first basketball jersey – men's or women's – to be retired at USC.

== Previous season ==
The 1984–85 USC Trojans women's basketball team finished with an overall record of 20–9 and a No. 15 ranking in the final AP poll. They reached the Sweet Sixteen of the women's NCAA tournament before losing to No. 3 Long Beach State, 74–72, in the West regional semifinal round.

== Roster ==
1985–86 USC Trojans women's basketball team
Players
Coaches

Pos.	#	Name	Height	Year	Previous school	Hometown
G	21	Rhonda Windham	—	RS Jr		Bronx, New York
F	31	Cheryl Miller	6 ft 2 in (1.88 m)	Sr	Riverside Polytechnic	Riverside, California
G	44	Cynthia Cooper	5 ft 10 in (1.78 m)	Sr	Locke	Los Angeles, California

Head coach

- Linda Sharp (Cal State Fullerton)

Assistant coach(es)

Legend

- (C) Team captain
- (S) Suspended
- (I) Ineligible
- (W) Walk-on
- Injured
- Current redshirt

Roster

== Schedule ==
Date time, TV	Rank^{#}	Opponent^{#}	Result	Record	Site city, state
Regular season
Nov 22, 1985*	No. 7	BYU	W 102–53	1–0	L.A. Sports Arena; Los Angeles, California
Nov 26, 1985*	No. 7	at Pepperdine	W 94–50	2–0	Firestone Fieldhouse; Malibu, California
Nov 29, 1985*	No. 7	vs. Saint Joseph's; Maryland Tournament	W 96–66	3–0	Cole Field House; College Park, Maryland
Nov 30, 1985*	No. 7	at Maryland; Maryland Tournament	W 76–54	4–0	Cole Field House; College Park, Maryland
Dec 5, 1985*	No. 5	Indiana	W 99–53	5–0	L.A. Sports Arena; Los Angeles, California
Dec 7, 1985*	No. 5	at Cal Poly Pomona	W 88–56	6–0	Kellogg Gym; Pomona, California
Dec 10, 1985*	No. 4	at No. 1 Texas	L 78–94	6–1	Frank Erwin Center (11,470); Austin, Texas
Dec 13, 1985*	No. 4	No. 11 Tennessee	W 85–77	7–1	L.A. Sports Arena; Los Angeles, California
Dec 22, 1985*	No. 3	Oregon State	W 117–55	8–1	L.A. Sports Arena; Los Angeles, California
Dec 27, 1985*	No. 3	Missouri; Transamerica-USC Tournament	W 118–68	9–1	L.A. Sports Arena; Los Angeles, California
Dec 28, 1985*	No. 3	No. 2 Georgia; Transamerica-USC Tournament	W 70–67	10–1	L.A. Sports Arena; Los Angeles, California
Jan 3, 1986*	No. 2	Old Dominion	W 89–76	11–1	Los Angeles Convention Center; Los Angeles, California
Jan 6, 1986*	No. 2	at No. 5 Louisiana Tech	L 53–75	11–2	Thomas Assembly Center; Ruston, Louisiana
Jan 8, 1986*	No. 2	at No. 15 Ohio State	W 83–81 ^{OT}	12–2	St. John Arena; Columbus, Ohio
Jan 14, 1986*	No. 5	at Cal State Fullerton	W 80–68	13–2	Titan Gym; Fullerton, California
Jan 16, 1986	No. 5	Arizona	W 92–72	14–2 (1–0)	L.A. Sports Arena; Los Angeles, California
Jan 18, 1986	No. 5	Arizona State	W 95–61	15–2 (2–0)	L.A. Sports Arena; Los Angeles, California
Jan 25, 1986	No. 5	at Stanford	W 81–59	16–2 (3–0)	Maples Pavilion; Palo Alto, California
Jan 26, 1986*	No. 4	at California	W 86–70	17–2	Harmon Gym; Berkeley, California
Jan 28, 1986*	No. 4	No. 7 Long Beach State	L 75–76	17–3	L.A. Sports Arena; Los Angeles, California
Feb 1, 1986	No. 4	UCLA	W 89–67	18–3 (4–0)	L.A. Sports Arena; Los Angeles, California
Feb 4, 1986*	No. 4	at San Diego State	W 91–73	19–3	Peterson Gymnasium; San Diego, California
Feb 8, 1986*	No. 4	Cal State Fullerton	W 87–64	20–3	L.A. Sports Arena; Los Angeles, California
Feb 14, 1986	No. 4	at Arizona State	W 80–57	21–3 (5–0)	ASU Activity Center; Tempe, Arizona
Feb 15, 1986	No. 4	at Arizona	W 83–67	22–3 (6–0)	McKale Center; Tucson, Arizona
Feb 20, 1986	No. 4	Stanford	W 88–62	23–3 (7–0)	L.A. Sports Arena; Los Angeles, California
Feb 22, 1986*	No. 7	No. 4 Long Beach State	W 99–68	24–3	L.A. Sports Arena; Los Angeles, California
Feb 28, 1986*	No. 4	vs. Utah State; Northern Lights Invitational	W 115–45	25–3	Sullivan Arena; Anchorage, Alaska
Mar 1, 1986*	No. 4	vs. SMU; Northern Lights Invitational	W 121–61	26–3	Sullivan Arena; Anchorage, Alaska
Mar 2, 1986*	No. 4	vs. NE Louisiana; Northern Lights Invitational	L 68–70	26–4	Sullivan Arena; Anchorage, Alaska
Mar 6, 1986	No. 4	at UCLA; Rivalry	W 89–57	27–4 (8–0)	Pauley Pavilion; Los Angeles, California
NCAA tournament
Mar 16, 1986*	(1 W) No. 3	(8 W) Montana; Second round	W 81–50	28–4	L.A. Sports Arena; Los Angeles, California
Mar 21, 1983*	(1 W) No. 3	vs. (4 W) No. 16 North Carolina; Regional Semifinal – Sweet Sixteen	W 84–70	29–4	Long Beach Arena; Long Beach, California
Mar 23, 1986*	(1 W) No. 3	vs. (2 W) No. 4 Louisiana Tech; Regional Final – Elite Eight	W 80–64	30–4	Long Beach Arena; Long Beach, California
Mar 28, 1986*	(1 W) No. 3	vs. (4 ME) No. 15 Tennessee; National Semifinal – Final Four	W 83–59	31–4	Rupp Arena; Lexington, Kentucky
Mar 30, 1986*	(1 W) No. 3	vs. (1 MW) No. 1 Texas; National Championship	L 81–97	31–5	Rupp Arena; Lexington, Kentucky
*Non-conference game. ^{#}Rankings from AP Poll. (#) Tournament seedings in parentheses. W=West. All times are in Pacific Time.

Source: USCTrojans.com

== Rankings ==
Ranking movements Legend: ██ Increase in ranking ██ Decrease in ranking
	Week																
Poll	Pre	1	2	3	4	5	6	7	8	9	10	11	12	13	14	15	Final
AP	7	5	4	3	3	2	2	5	5	4	7	7	7	4	4	3	Not released
Coaches	7	5	3	3	3	2	2	5	5	4	7	7	7	5	3	3	2
