= 1985–86 Tennessee Lady Volunteers basketball team =

Intercollegiate basketball season

1985–86 Tennessee Lady Volunteers basketball

NCAA tournament, Final Four
- Conference: Southeastern Conference

Ranking
- Coaches: No. 5
- AP: No. 15
- Record: 24–10 (6–3 SEC)
- Head coach: Pat Summitt (12th season)
- Assistant coaches: Mickie DeMoss; Holly Warlick
- Home arena: Stokely Athletic Center

1985–86 SEC women's basketball standings
	Conf.				Overall
Team	W		L	PCT	W		L	PCT
No. 2 Georgia ^{†}	9	–	0	1.000	30	–	2	.938
No. 9 LSU	6	–	3	.667	27	–	6	.818
No. 7 Auburn	6	–	3	.667	24	–	6	.800
No. 11 Ole Miss	6	–	3	.667	24	–	8	.750
No. 15 Tennessee	5	–	4	.556	24	–	10	.706
Kentucky	4	–	5	.444	18	–	11	.621
No. 20 Vanderbilt	4	–	5	.444	22	–	9	.710
Alabama	3	–	6	.333	20	–	9	.690
Florida	2	–	7	.222	10	–	18	.357
Mississippi State	0	–	9	.000	8	–	20	.286
† 1986 SEC tournament winner Rankings from AP poll

The 1985–86 Tennessee Lady Volunteers basketball team represented the University of Tennessee as a member of the Southeastern Conference during the 1985–86 women's college basketball season. Coached by Pat Summitt, the Lady Volunteers finished 24–10 and reached the program's third NCAA Final Four. The Lady Vols started the season ranked No. 9 and played their home games at Stokely Athletic Center.

== Roster ==
1985–86 Tennessee Lady Volunteers women's basketball team
Players
Coaches

Pos.	#	Name	Height	Year	Previous school	Hometown
G	10	Pam Marr	5 ft 6 in (1.68 m)	Sr		Winter Park, Florida
G	15	Kristie Snyder	5 ft 6 in (1.68 m)	Sr		Knoxville, Tennessee
G	23	Shelley Sexton	5 ft 7 in (1.7 m)	Jr		Lake City, Tennessee
F	30	Bridgette Gordon	6 ft 0 in (1.83 m)	Fr	DeLand	DeLand, Florida
F	34	Lisa Webb	5 ft 9 in (1.75 m)	Jr		Milledgeville, Georgia
F	42	Valerie Freeman	6 ft 0 in (1.83 m)	Jr		Milledgeville, Georgia
C	44	Cheryl Littlejohn	6 ft 3 in (1.91 m)	Jr		Gastonia, North Carolina
F	53	Amy Gamble	5 ft 10 in (1.78 m)	Jr		Glen Dale, West Virginia

Head coach

- Pat Summitt

Assistant coach(es)

- Mickie DeMoss
- Holly Warlick

Legend

- (C) Team captain
- (S) Suspended
- (I) Ineligible
- (W) Walk-on
- Injured
- Current redshirt

Roster

== Schedule and results ==
Date time, TV	Rank^{#}	Opponent^{#}	Result	Record	Site city, state
Regular season
Nov 24, 1985*	No. 9	East Carolina	W 74–56	1–0	Stokely Athletic Center; Knoxville, Tennessee
Nov 27, 1985*	No. 9	Illinois	W 71–57	2–0	Stokely Athletic Center; Knoxville, Tennessee
Dec 1, 1985*	No. 9	No. 1 Texas	L 52–74	2–1	Stokely Athletic Center (3,031); Knoxville, Tennessee
Dec 13, 1985*	No. 11	at No. 4 USC	L 77–85	5–2	L.A. Sports Arena; Los Angeles, California
Feb 22, 1986	No. 14	Mississippi State	W 72–51	20–9 (5–4)	Stokely Athletic Center; Knoxville, Tennessee
Feb 24, 1986*	No. 14	Memphis State	W 94–79	20–9	Stokely Athletic Center; Knoxville, Tennessee
SEC tournament
Mar 1, 1986*	No. 14	vs. No. 12 Ole Miss; Quarterfinals	L 78–83	21–9	Stegeman Coliseum; Athens, Georgia
NCAA tournament
Mar 16, 1986*	(4 ME) No. 15	(5 ME) Iowa; Second round	W 73–68	22–9	Stokeley Athletic Center; Knoxville, Tennessee
Mar 21, 1986*	(4 ME) No. 15	(1 ME) No. 2 Georgia; Regional Semifinal – Sweet Sixteen	W 85–82	23–9	Carver–Hawkeye Arena; Iowa City, Iowa
Mar 23, 1986*	(4 ME) No. 15	(2 ME) No. 9 LSU; Regional Final – Elite Eight	W 67–65	24–9	Carver–Hawkeye Arena; Iowa City, Iowa
Mar 28, 1986*	(4 ME) No. 15	vs. (1 W) No. 3 USC; National Semifinal – Final Four	L 59–83	24–10	Rupp Arena; Lexington, Kentucky
*Non-conference game. ^{#}Rankings from AP Poll. (#) Tournament seedings in parentheses. ME=Mideast.
