= 1985–86 Western Kentucky Lady Toppers basketball team =

Intercollegiate basketball season

1985–86 Western Kentucky Lady Toppers basketball

NCAA East Regional Champion SBC Tournament Champion Sun Belt Conference Champion Communiplex Classic Champion Bud Light Shootout Champion

NCAA Tournament, Final Four
- Conference: Sun Belt Conference

Ranking
- Coaches: No. 3
- AP: No. 5
- Record: 32–4 (6–0 SBC)
- Head coach: Paul Sanderford (4th season)
- Home arena: E. A. Diddle Arena

1985–86 Sun Belt Conference women's basketball standings
	Conf.				Overall
Team	W		L	PCT	W		L	PCT
No. 5 WKU †	6	–	0	1.000	32	–	4	.889
Old Dominion	5	–	1	.833	15	–	13	.536
UNC Charlotte	3	–	3	.500	15	–	13	.536
UAB	3	–	3	.500	13	–	16	.448
South Alabama	2	–	4	.333	18	–	11	.621
VCU	2	–	4	.333	14	–	14	.500
South Florida	0	–	6	.000	5	–	22	.185
† 1986 Sun Belt tournament winner Rankings from AP Poll

The 1985–86 WKU Lady Toppers basketball team represented Western Kentucky University during the 1985–86 NCAA Division I women's basketball season. The Lady Toppers were led by head coach Paul Sanderford and Sun Belt Conference Player of the Year Lillie Mason. They won the SBC season and tournament championships and received a bid to the 1986 NCAA Division I women's basketball tournament, where they advanced to the Final Four. This team set a school record for wins and had three players named to All-American teams, Mason, Clemette Haskins, and Kami Thomas. Thomas and Haskins joined Mason on the All-Conference team; Mason was the SBC Tournament Most Outstanding Player (MOP) and Haskins made the All-Tournament team. Haskins was selected to the NCAA Final Four team and Mason was NCAA East Region MOP with Thomas joining her on the All-Region team.

== Schedule ==
Date time, TV	Rank^{#}	Opponent^{#}	Result	Record	Site city, state
Regular season
11/22/1985*	No. 6	at No. 20* Texas Tech	W 88–71	1–0	Lubbock Municipal Coliseum; Lubbock, TX
11/25/1985*	No. 6	South Alabama; Bowling Green Bank Invitational	W 86–55	2–0	E. A. Diddle Arena; Bowling Green, KY
11/26/1985*	No. 6	No. 23* Oklahoma; Bowling Green Bank Invitational	L 81–89	2–1	E. A. Diddle Arena; Bowling Green, KY
12/2/1985*	No. 9	No. 15 Iowa	W 77–67	3–1	E. A. Diddle Arena; Bowling Green, KY
12/6/1985*	No. 8	at Southern Illinois	W 92–60	4–1	Banterra Center; Carbondale, IL
12/9/1985*	No. 9	Middle Tennessee	W 103–78	5–1	E. A. Diddle Arena; Bowling Green, KY
12/14/1985*	No. 9	at Morehead State	W 85–66	6–1	Ellis Johnson Arena; Morehead, KY
12/21/1985*	No. 9	at Evansville	W 96–66	7–1	Roberts Municipal Stadium; Evansville, IN
12/28/1985*	No. 9	vs. Xavier; Communiplex Classic	W 122–43	8–1	Riverfront Coliseum; Cincinnati, OH
12/29/1985*	No. 9	at Cincinnati; Communiplex Classic	W 87–43	9–1	Riverfront Coliseum; Cincinnati, OH
1/3/1986*	No. 9	vs. Kansas State; Bud Light Shootout	W 95–69	10–1	Thomas & Mack Center; Las Vegas, NV
1/4/1986*	No. 9	vs. California; Bud Light Shootout	W 81–59	11–1	Thomas & Mack Center; Las Vegas, NV
1/7/1986*	No. 7	West Virginia	W 95–49	12–1	E. A. Diddle Arena; Bowling Green, KY
1/10/1986*	No. 7	Dayton	W 104–75	13–1	E. A. Diddle Arena; Bowling Green, KY
1/12/1986	No. 6	South Florida	W 94–48	14–1 (1–0)	E. A. Diddle Arena; Bowling Green, KY
1/14/1986	No. 6	Memphis State	W 95–71	15–1	E. A. Diddle Arena; Bowling Green, KY
1/16/1986*	No. 6	at Louisville	W 98–55	16–1	Freedom Hall; Louisville, KY
1/22/1986	No. 6	UNC Charlotte	W 85–51	17–1 (2–0)	E. A. Diddle Arena; Bowling Green, KY
1/27/1986*	No. 6	Alabama–Huntsville	W 108–55	18–1	E. A. Diddle Arena; Bowling Green, KY
1/30/1986*	No. 6	Tennessee Tech	W 83–79	19–1	Eblen Center; Cookeville, TN
2/4/1986*	No. 5	Murray State	W 93–69	20–1	E. A. Diddle Arena; Bowling Green, KY
2/7/1986*	No. 5	Cheyney State	W 101–52	21–1	E. A. Diddle Arena; Bowling Green, KY
2/10/1986*	No. 4	at No. 2 Georgia	L 61–93	21–2	Stegeman Coliseum; Athens, GA
2/15/1986	No. 4	at UAB	W 83–63	22–2 (3–0)	BJCC Coliseum; Birmingham, AL
2/17/1986	No. 6	at South Alabama	W 72–66	23–2 (4–0)	Jag Gym; Mobile, AL
2/23/1986	No. 5	Old Dominion	W 74–64	24–2 (5–0)	E. A. Diddle Arena; Bowling Green, KY
2/24/1986	No. 5	VCU	W 101–51	25–2 (6–0)	E. A. Diddle Arena; Bowling Green, KY
2/28/1986*	No. 5	at Alaska Anchorage; Northern Lights Invitational	W 98–78	26–2	Anchorage, AK
3/1/1986*	No. 5	vs. No. 16* Louisiana–Monroe; Northern Lights Invitational	L 84–88	26–3	Anchorage, AK
3/2/1986*	No. 5	vs. SMU; Northern Lights Invitational	W 76–66	27–3	Anchorage, AK
Sun Belt tournament
3/7/1986	(1) No. 5	(4) UAB; Semifinals	W 80–53	28–3	E. A. Diddle Arena; Bowling Green, KY
3/8/1986	(1) No. 5	(2) Old Dominion; Championship	W 69–61	29–3	E. A. Diddle Arena; Bowling Green, KY
NCAA tournament
3/16/1986*	(E4) No. 5	(E5) No. 24* Saint Joseph's (PA); East Region Second Round	W 74–65	30–3	E. A. Diddle Arena; Bowling Green, KY
3/20/1986*	(E4) No. 5	vs. (E8) No. 17 James Madison; Sweet Sixteen	W 72–51	31–3	Palestra; Philadelphia, PA
3/22/1986*	(E4) No. 5	vs. (E2) No. 10 Rutgers; Elite Eight	W 89–74	32–3	Palestra; Philadelphia, PA
3/28/1986*	(E4) No. 5	vs. (MW1) No. 1 Texas; Final Four	L 65–90	32–4	Rupp Arena; Lexington, KY
*Non-conference game. ^{#}Rankings from AP Poll. * USA Today rankings. (#) Tournament seedings in parentheses.
