= 1985–86 NCAA Division I women's basketball rankings =

- Season: 1985–86
- NCAA Tournament: 1986
- Preseason No. 1: Texas
- NCAA Tournament Champions: Texas
NCAA Division I women's basketball rankings


Two human polls comprise the 1985–86 NCAA Division I women's basketball rankings, the AP Poll and the Coaches Poll, in addition to various publications' preseason polls. The AP poll is currently a poll of sportswriters, while the USA Today Coaches' Poll is a poll of college coaches. The AP conducts polls weekly through the end of the regular season and conference play, while the Coaches poll conducts a final, post-NCAA tournament poll as well.

== Legend ==
–	Not ranked
(#)	Ranking

== AP Poll ==
Team	12-Nov	1-Dec	8-Dec	15-Dec	22-Dec	29-Dec	5-Jan	12-Jan	19-Jan	26-Jan	2-Feb	9-Feb	16-Feb	23-Feb	2-Mar	9-Mar
Texas	1	1	1	1	1	1	1	1	1	1	1	1	1	1	1	1
Georgia	2	2	2	2	2	3	3	2	2	2	2	2	2	2	2	2
USC	7	5	4	3	3	2	2	5	5	4	7	7	7	4	4	3
La. Tech	4	4	3	7	7	6	5	3	3	5	4	3	5	6	6	4
WKU	6	9	9	9	9	9	7	6	6	6	5	4	6	5	5	5
Virginia	18	10	7	6	5	5	4	4	4	3	3	5	3	3	3	6
Auburn	8	12	12	11	10	10	10	9	10	8	11	10	9	9	9	7
LB State	11	7	6	4	4	4	6	7	7	7	6	6	4	7	7	8
LSU	19	14	13	12	13	12	12	10	8	12	13	9	10	10	10	9
Rutgers	–	–	–	–	–	–	18	13	12	10	9	12	8	8	8	10
Ole Miss	12	8	8	8	8	8	8	8	9	9	8	8	11	12	12	11
Ohio State	10	16	18	16	14	14	15	14	13	13	12	11	12	11	11	12
Penn State	13	6	10	10	11	13	16	15	16	15	14	15	13	16	16	13
Iowa	14	15	14	18	19	19	17	16	17	17	18	16	14	13	13	14
Tennessee	9	11	11	13	12	11	11	12	11	11	10	14	15	14	14	15
UNC	17	19	19	20	18	17	19	18	15	16	15	13	17	17	17	16
JMU	–	–	–	–	–	–	–	–	–	20	19	18	T18	18	18	17
Southern Ill.	–	–	–	–	–	–	–	–	–	–	–	–	–	–	–	18
Oklahoma	–	17	15	14	16	15	13	11	14	14	16	17	16	15	15	19
Vanderbilt	–	–	–	–	–	–	–	–	–	–	–	–	–	–	–	20
Duke	–	–	–	–	–	–	–	20	18	18	17	20	T18	–	–	–
Houston	–	–	–	19	17	20	–	–	–	–	–	–	–	–	–	–
Idaho	–	–	–	–	–	–	–	–	20	–	–	–	–	–	–	–
La.-Monroe	3	3	5	5	6	7	9	19	–	–	–	–	–	–	–	–
NC State	15	20	20	–	20	18	14	17	19	–	–	–	–	–	–	–
Northwestern	–	–	–	–	–	–	20	–	–	–	–	–	–	–	–	–
ODU	5	13	17	15	–	–	–	–	–	–	–	–	–	–	–	–
Providence	–	–	–	–	–	–	–	–	–	–	–	–	–	20	20	–
St. Joseph's	T20	–	–	–	–	–	–	–	–	–	–	–	–	–	–	–
St. Peter's	–	–	–	–	–	–	–	–	–	19	20	19	20	19	19	–
San Diego St	16	–	–	–	–	–	–	–	–	–	–	–	–	–	–	–
UNLV	T20	18	16	17	15	16	–	–	–	–	–	–	–	–	–	–

== USA Today Coaches poll ==
Team	PS	3-Dec	10-Dec	17-Dec	24-Dec	31-Dec	7-Jan	14-Jan	21-Jan	28-Jan	4-Feb	11-Feb	18-Feb	25-Feb	4-Mar	11-Mar	18-Mar
Texas	1	1	1	1	1	1	1	1	1	1	1	1	1	1	1	1	1
Southern California	7	5	3	3	3	2	2	5	5	4	7	7	7	5	3	3	2
Western Kentucky	6	8	8	7	7	8	7	7	6	6	4	3	6	4	4	4	3
Georgia	2	2	2	2	2	3	3	2	2	2	2	2	2	2	2	2	4
Tennessee	11	14	15	14	14	13	12	13	11	15	12	14	12	14	15	16	5
Ole Miss	12	9	9	10	10	10	10	8	9	8	8	8	11	11	11	9	6
Louisiana Tech	4	4	10	8	9	7	6	3	3	5	5	4	5	6	7	5	7
LSU	18	13	7	9	12	12	11	10	8	12	11	12	10	10	10	8	8
Auburn	8	10	12	11	8	9	8	9	10	9	13	10	9	9	13	10	9
Rutgers	–	24	22	22	19	24	21	17	12	11	9	9	8	8	6	11	10
Louisiana-Monroe	3	3	5	5	6	6	9	11	14	10	17	19	17	16	9	12	11
Long Beach State	9	6	4	4	4	4	4	6	7	7	6	6	3	7	5	7	12
Penn State	13	7	11	12	11	11	15	14	15	16	14	15	13	17	16	13	13
Virginia	16	11	6	6	5	5	5	4	4	3	3	5	4	3	8	6	14
North Carolina	17	19	21	19	18	19	18	18	16	17	15	13	18	18	18	17	15
James Madison	–	–	–	–	–	–	–	–	–	–	24	21	19	19	20	22	16
Ohio State	10	16	17	15	15	14	14	16	13	14	10	11	14	12	14	15	17
Oklahoma	23	15	14	13	17	16	13	12	17	13	16	17	16	15	17	18	18
Iowa	14	18	16	18	21	17	16	15	18	18	18	16	15	13	12	14	19
Montana	–	–	–	–	–	–	–	–	–	–	–	–	–	–	24	25	20
Texas Tech	20	23	24	24	–	–	24	22	19	19	19	18	20	21	22	19	21
Southern Illinois	–	–	–	–	–	–	–	–	–	–	–	25	23	22	23	21	22
Drake	–	–	–	–	–	–	–	–	–	–	–	–	–	–	–	–	23
Saint Joseph's	21	22	25	25	22	23	19	T23	22	20	22	22	24	23	21	24	24
Vanderbilt	–	–	–	–	25	25	22	21	21	21	20	24	–	–	19	20	25
Duke	–	–	–	–	–	–	–	–	–	23	25	–	21	25	–	–	–
Houston	24	25	18	16	13	20	20	20	20	22	–	–	–	–	–	–	–
Kansas State	–	–	–	–	–	–	25	–	–	–	–	–	–	–	–	–	–
Kentucky	–	21	20	21	23	22	23	T23	24	24	23	23	–	–	–	–	–
Maryland	–	–	–	–	–	–	–	–	–	–	–	–	–	–	–	23	–
NC State	15	20	23	23	20	18	17	19	23	–	–	–	–	–	–	–	–
Ohio	–	–	–	–	–	–	–	–	–	–	–	–	25	24	–	–	–
Old Dominion	5	12	19	20	24	21	–	25	–	–	–	–	–	–	–	–	–
Saint Peter's	–	–	–	–	–	–	–	–	25	25	21	20	22	20	25	–	–
San Diego State	19	–	–	–	–	–	–	–	–	–	–	–	–	–	–	–	–
UCLA	25	–	–	–	–	–	–	–	–	–	–	–	–	–	–	–	–
UNLV	22	17	13	17	16	15	–	–	–	–	–	–	–	–	–	–	–
