= Clarissa Davis =

American basketball player (born 1967)

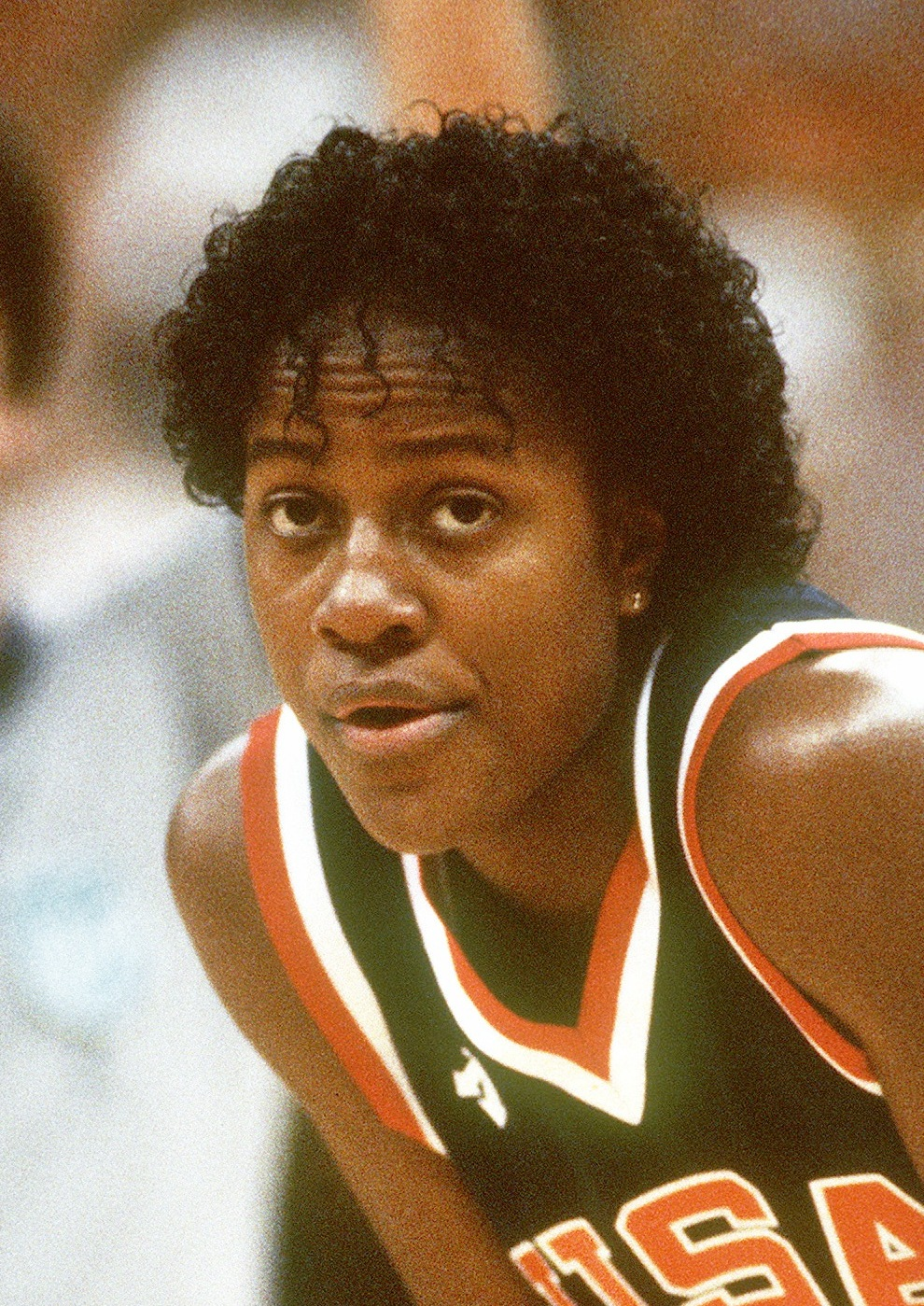
- Davis at the 1987 Pan American Games

Personal information
- Born: June 4, 1967 (age 59) San Antonio, Texas, U.S.
- Listed height: 6 ft 1 in (1.85 m)

Career information
- High school: John Jay (San Antonio, Texas)
- College: Texas (1985–1989)
- Position: Forward

Career highlights
- NCAA champion (1986); NCAA Tournament MOP (1986); Wade Trophy (1989); USBWA National Player of the Year (1989); WBCA Player of the Year (1989); 2× Naismith College Player of the Year (1987, 1989); All-American – USBWA (1989); 2× Kodak All-American (1987, 1989); Texas Miss Basketball (1985)
- Stats at Basketball Reference
- Women's Basketball Hall of Fame
Medals
Women's basketball
Representing the United States
Pan American Games
Gold medal – first place	1987 Indianapolis	Team
FIBA World Championship
Gold medal – first place	1986 Moscow	Team competition
Olympic Games
Bronze medal – third place	1992 Barcelona	Team competition

Clarissa Davis (born June 4, 1967) is a former Texas women's basketball All-American, who is also known as Clarissa Davis-Wrightsil. She is a National Player of the Year, Olympic and pro standout, and was inducted into Women's Basketball Hall of Fame in April 2006. She was one of six inductees in the Class of 2006, which features four former players and two coaches. Born and raised in San Antonio, Texas, Davis played under coach Mike Floyd at John Jay High School before playing at the University of Texas. She also played basketball in Europe with Galatasaray Istanbul and Fenerbahçe Istanbul in Turkey and won Turkish Championships with both of these rival clubs. She won in 1991 EuroLeague Women with Cesena.

Clarissa Davis graduated with a Communications bachelor's degree from the University of Texas in 1989. She also finished 2nd all-time in career points in the Southwestern Athletic Conference (SWC) with 2,008 points scored in four seasons (only trailing Michi Atkins' 2,134 points).

== Amateur career ==
- Won the Naismith College Player of the Year award in both 1987 and 1989 and the Wade Trophy in 1989
- As a senior in 1988–89, named Naismith College Player of the Year, USBWA Women's National Player of the Year, WBCA Player of the Year, and Mercedes Benz National Player of the Year
- Two-time Kodak All-American and Naismith All-American, U.S. Basketball Writers Association All-American at the University of Texas (1987, 1989) ... consensus All-American
- Earned Most Outstanding Player honors as a freshman at the 1986 Final Four, leading Texas to the NCAA Championship and an undefeated season with a 34–0 record... Also led Texas to the NCAA Final Four (1987) and to the Elite Eight twice (1988, 1989)
- Named to both the NCAA and the Southwest Conference "Team of the Decade" for the 1980s, earning top honors as the SWC's "Athlete of the Decade"
- Scored 2,008 points during her collegiate career for an average of 19.9 ppg ... in the Texas career record book, she stands: 1st, scoring average; 3rd, scoring; 4th, rebound average (8.7 rpg); 5th, field goal pct. (.539); 8th, rebounding (887)
- Set Texas single season records (as a senior) for points (843), scoring average (26.3 ppg) and free throws made (188)
- Came to UT after starring at John Jay High School in San Antonio
- No. 24 retired by Texas Longhorns in 2020.

== Career statistics ==
Legend
GP	Games played	GS	Games started	MPG	Minutes per game	RPG	Rebounds per game
APG	Assists per game	SPG	Steals per game	BPG	Blocks per game	PPG	Points per game
TO	Turnovers per game	FG%	Field-goal percentage	3P%	3-point field-goal percentage	FT%	Free-throw percentage
**Bold**	Career best	°	League leader

=== WNBA ===
==== Regular season ====
Year	Team	GP	GS	MPG	FG%	3P%	FT%	RPG	APG	SPG	BPG	TO	PPG
1999	Phoenix	14	9	18.5	43.3	30.3	66.7	2.7	1.4	0.9	0.3	1.6	9.3
Career	1 year, 1 team	14	9	18.5	43.3	30.3	66.7	2.7	1.4	0.9	0.3	1.6	9.3

=== College ===
Legend
GP	Games played	GS	Games started	MPG	Minutes per game
FG%	Field goal percentage	3P%	3-point field goal percentage	FT%	Free throw percentage
RPG	Rebounds per game	APG	Assists per game	SPG	Steals per game
BPG	Blocks per game	PPG	Points per game	**Bold**	Career high

Year	Team	GP	Points	FG%	3P%	FT%	RPG	APG	SPG	BPG	PPG
1986	Texas	34	459	58.3%	NA	66.0%	7.7	0.5	NA	NA	13.5
1987	Texas	26	483	57.6%	NA	62.3%	8.3	**1.5**	NA	NA	18.6
1988	Texas	9	223	**64.1%**	0%	**74.0%**	9.7	1.1	1.9	**0.6**	24.8
1989	Texas	32	**843**	55.4%	53.8%	71.8%	**9.9**	1.0	**2.3**	0.4	**26.3**
Career		101	2008	57.5%	53.8%	68.3%	8.7	1.0	0.9	0.2	19.9

== USA Basketball ==
Davis-Wrightsil's first experience with international basketball came in 1986, when she was a member of the team that won a gold medal at the 1986 World Championship. She also played in the 1986 and 1994 Goodwill Games, and the 1987 Pan American Games. After serving as an alternate on the 1988 U.S. Olympic Team, she played on the 1992 U.S. Olympic Team, which received a bronze medal in Barcelona, and was the team's second-leading scorer (13.0 ppg).

== WNBA career ==
Clarissa Davis was selected by the Phoenix Mercury in the second round (22nd pick overall) of the 1999 WNBA Draft. She played in fourteen games with the Mercury, averaging 9.3 points per game in her only season in the league.

== Coaching career ==
After her playing career, Davis-Wrightsil worked for the San Antonio Spurs organization from 1999 to 2002. She ran the Spurs' successful campaign to obtain the San Antonio Silver Stars as a WNBA franchise, and served as the Silver Star's Chief Operating Officer from 2002 to 2006. Davis was an assistant coach for the University of Texas Longhorns women's basketball team during the 2006–2007 season. She left Texas after one season to take a similar position with C. Vivian Stringer's Rutgers University team in 2008. After helping the Scarlet Knights to their fifth consecutive Sweet Sixteen appearance in the 2008–2009 season, Davis-Wrightsil resigned to be with her ailing mother in Texas. Inducted into Women's Basketball Hall of Fame in April 2006, Davis is also the founder of TEAMXPRESS, a non-profit sports-based mentoring organization for girls in San Antonio, TX.
