= Hilda M. Hankerson =

American basketball player and coach

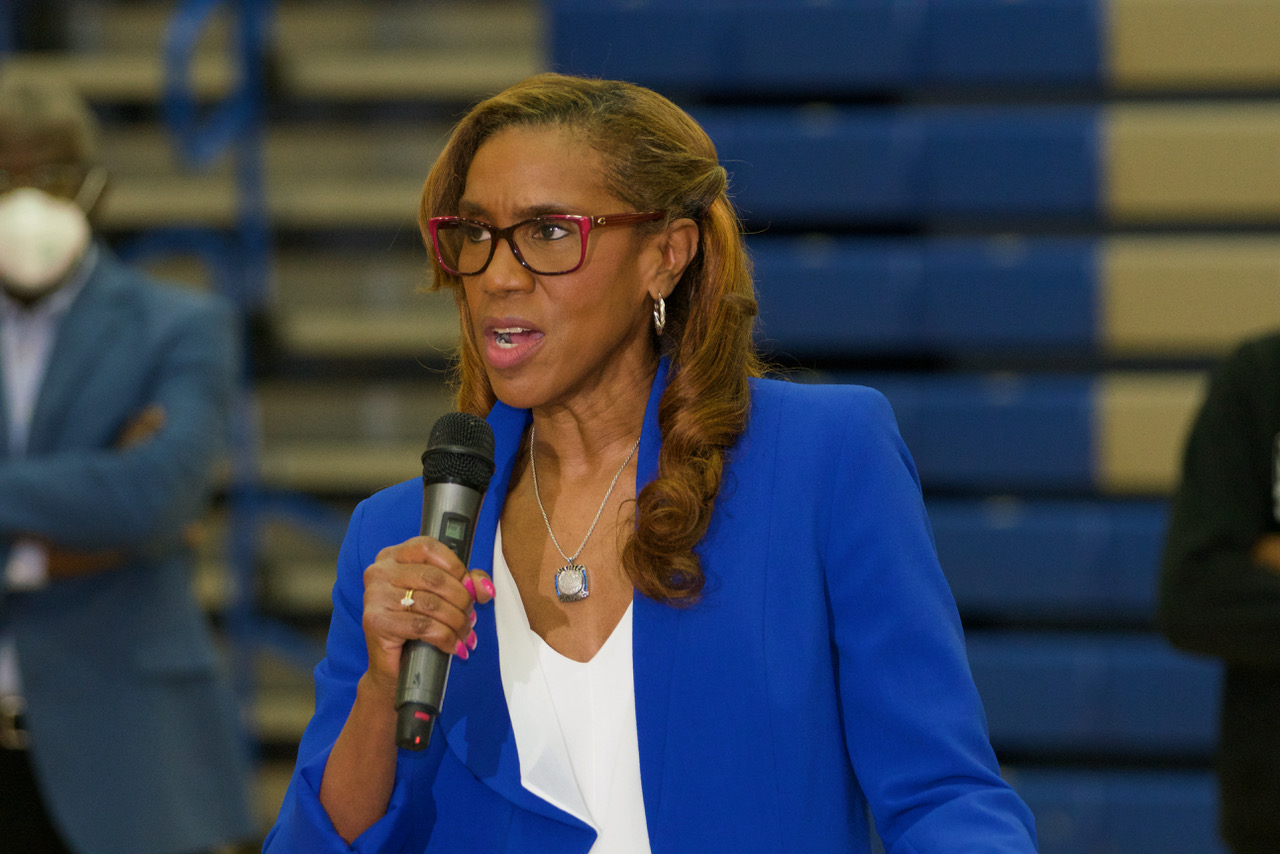
- Coach Hankerson giving a motivation speech

Biographical details
- Born: July 2, 1956 (age 70); Atlanta, Georgia

Playing career
- 1974–1978: Mercer University

Coaching career (HC unless noted)
- 1978–1982: Mississippi State University (assistant)
- 1995–present: Westlake HS

Accomplishments and honors

Championships
- Geico Girls High School national championships (2021); 4× Georgia state high school championships

Hilda M. Hankerson (born July 2, 1956) is an American high school girls basketball coach. She is the head coach for the Westlake High School (Georgia) Lions girls basketball team where she won one National Championship and four Georgia State High School girls basketball Championships. She played for the Mercer Bears women's basketball team alongside of Hall of Famers Cindy Brogdon and Sybil Blalock from 1974 to 1978. Hankerson was also an assistant coach for the Mississippi State Bulldogs women's basketball team. In 2020, she won the USA Today 2020 Girls High School Basketball Coach of the Year.

== Basketball career ==
Hilda "Heard" Hankerson is a graduate of Mercer University. She played point guard for the Mercer Bears women's basketball team from 1974 to 1978. She was a four-year starter and played an integral role in Mercer University women winning 2 State Championships and 2 championship runners-up. The Bears were Southern Women's Athletic Conference regular season and tournament champions and AIAW regional champs during her playing tenure. Additionally, Mercer won the Georgia AIAW Tournament and advanced to the championship game of the AIAW regional tournament. During her career, Mercer advanced to the Women's National Invitational Tournament making it to the round of 16. The legendary head coach of The University of Tennessee Lady Vols, Pat Summitt, loss her very first game as head coach to Mercer 84–83 on December 7, 1974 when Hankerson played point guard.

== Coaching career ==
Hankerson's coaching career began in 1978. She served at Mississippi State University Bulldog women's basketball team as an Assistant Basketball Coach, Recruiting Coordinator and Guards Coach, from 1978 to 1982 in the Southeastern Conference.

=== Westlake High School ===
Hankerson joined the Westlake Lady lions in 1997. During her time with Westlake she has led the team to five final fours, five elite eights, four sweet 16s, eight state playoffs and nine regional championships. She achieved her 600th win during the 2018–2019 season, finishing the year with a 30–0 record. In 2019 Hankerson guided the team to their third consecutive Class 7A state title, following a 72–53 win over Collins Hill. The team won the title for the fourth time in 2020.

She also served as Athletic Director for Westlake from 2001 to 2011. During her tenure as both Athletic Director and Head Coach her teams averaged 20 plus wins each season since 1995 and over 50 girls basketball student athletes have received college scholarships from schools including the University of Georgia, Clemson University, Mercer University, Georgia Southern University, Troy State University, the University Southern Mississippi, Xavier University, College of Charleston, University of Alabama Birmingham, University of Tampa, and Jackson State University. Her 2020–21 team won the Geico High School Girls Basketball National Championship carried on ESPN2 3 April 2021 in Ft Myers, FL giving the State of Georgia its first ever girls high school basketball national championship. As Athletic Director, her program produced notables athletes to include former WNBA player Anriel Howard aka Lash Legend with the WWE and Cam Newton 2010 Heisman Trophy Winner and 2011 NFL No. 1 Draft Pick. She coached and personally mentored high school and collegiate standout NCAA National Champion guard Raven Johnson.

=== USA Basketball ===
Hankerson's first USA Basketball assignment was as a court coach for the 2019 USA Basketball Women's U16 National Teams trials. In an interview following the assignment, she shared that the position was the "most memorable highlight of my career."

== Honors and awards ==
- USA Today Girls High School Basketball Coach of The Year (2020)
- Atlanta Journal Constitution 5A Coach of the Year (2010)
- Georgia Athletic Coaches Association Region Coach of the year (2009, 2010, 2002, 2003)
- GACA All-Stars Head Coach (2006)
- GACA All-Stars Assistant Coach (2003, 2004)
- GACA All-Stars Coordinator Coach (2002)
- South Metro Region Coach of the Year (2002)
- Miami Dade County FL All-Star Coach (1986)
- USA Today All-USA high school basketball team (2020)

== Personal life ==
Hilda is the daughter of the late Air Force Technical Sergeant Nathan Heard, Jr. and surviving Mother Mrs Mary Heard of whom she attributes her inspiration and success to date. She is married to Theophilus Hankerson and has three sons, David C. Morris, Jarel R. Morris, Donovan D. Hankerson and one granddaughter, Kenylee Morris. Her siblings Brenda Heard Dent and Margaret Heard Cooper also played basketball. Brenda played with Hilda at Mercer University and Margaret in High School. Her brother in law, retired Air Force Colonel Willie Cooper, II played for the Mercer University men's basketball team and currently serves as the Westlake High School girls basketball team chaplain.
