= Jody Conradt =

American basketball player and coach

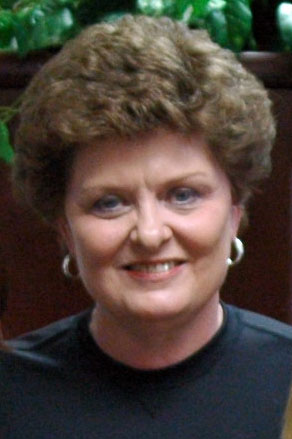

Current position
- Title: Special assistant to the women's athletic director
- Team: Texas
- Conference: Big 12

Biographical details
- Born: May 13, 1941 (age 85); Goldthwaite, Texas, U.S.

Playing career
- 1959–1963: Baylor

Coaching career (HC unless noted)

Basketball
- 1969–1973: Sam Houston State
- 1973–1976: Texas–Arlington
- 1976–2007: Texas

Volleyball
- 1973–1975: Texas–Arlington
- 1976–1977: Texas

Softball
- 1973–1976: Texas–Arlington

Administrative career (AD unless noted)
- 2007–present: Texas (special asst. to women's AD)

Head coaching record
- Overall: Basketball: 900–307 (.746) Volleyball: 165–67–15 (.698)

Accomplishments and honors

Championships
- NCAA Tournament championship (1986); 10× SWC regular season (1983–1990, 1993, 1996); 3× NCAA Regional—Final Four (1986, 1987, 2003); 2× Big 12 regular season (2003, 2004); 9× SWC tournament (1983–1990, 1994); Big 12 tournament (2003)

Awards
- 6× SWC Coach of the year (1984, 1985, 1986, 1987, 1988, 1996); 2× Big 12 Coach of the Year (2003, 2004); 2× WBCA Coach of the Year (1984, 1986)
- Basketball Hall of Fame; Inducted in 1998 (profile)
- Women's Basketball Hall of Fame
Medal record
Women's basketball
Head Coach for United States
Pan American Games
Gold medal – first place	1987 Indianapolis	Team competition

Addie Jo "Jody" Conradt (born May 13, 1941) is an American retired women's basketball coach. She was the head coach for the women's team at University of Texas at Austin (UT). Her coaching career spanned 38 years, with the last 31 years at UT from 1976 to 2007. She also served concurrently as the UT women's athletic director from 1992 to 2001. During her tenure at UT, she achieved several notable personal and team milestones in collegiate basketball. At retirement, she had tallied 900 career victories, second place in all time victories for an NCAA Division I basketball coach. Conradt was inducted in the inaugural class at the Women's Basketball Hall of Fame in 1999.

== High school and college ==
Addie Jo Conradt was born in Goldthwaite, Texas, United States to Ann and Charles Conradt. Both her parents were athletic, with her mother playing competitively on a local softball team, and her father playing semi-pro baseball. She was a standout basketball player at Goldthwaite High School, where she averaged 40 points per game. Many people growing up in Goldthwaite stayed there, according to Conradt, but she got a sense that one could have larger ambitions when a Goldthwaite native, Marie Reynolds, joined the All American Red Heads Team, a barnstorming basketball team which played throughout the United States and around the world. After high school, Conradt played collegiate basketball at Baylor University, earning a degree in physical education in 1963. She finished her collegiate basketball career averaging 20 points per game. After graduation, she taught and coached at Midway High School in Waco and earned her master's degree from Baylor in 1969.

== College coaching ==
Prior to Conradt's career at UT, she served as women's basketball head coach at Sam Houston State University from 1969 to 1973, where her teams had a record of 74–23. She then coached at the University of Texas at Arlington from 1973 to 1976, where her teams had a record of 43–39.

In 1975, in response to Title IX, the University of Texas created a separate women's athletic department. In 1976, they hired Donna Lopiano to become the first women's athletic director. The following year, Lopiano hired Conradt as coach of the women's basketball team. Conradt had attracted national attention while at the University of Texas at Arlington. After two losing seasons, they went 23–11 in the 1975–76 seasons, upsetting powerful opponents. Texas planned to bring the women's program to national prominence, and they felt Conradt was the right coach for the job. Teams coached by Condradt were using tactics not seen in many other places, such as full court pressure, double low posts and a transition game.

In Conradt's first season, the team went 36–10. The team was ranked in the AP top ten in the nation all but one year in the 1980s, including a string of four years, from 1984 to 1988, where they earned the number one in the nation ranking. The success translated into fan support — the team was averaging 7,500 fans per game by the end of the 1980s, including such state and national leaders as future governor Ann Richards and US Congresswoman Barbara Jordan.

In the 1985 NCAA tournament, the Lady Longhorns lost a heartbreaking game to Western Kentucky 92–90. Watching the game was highly recruited Clarissa Davis, who had not yet decided where to go to school. She resolved to go to Texas and help them. The following year, Texas would win the national championship with the first undefeated women's season, with a record of 34–0. Although Davis wasn't a starter on the team, she ended up earning the tournament's most valuable player award.

In 38 seasons Conradt's head coaching record was 900–306. At the time of her retirement, her 900 career victories were second only Pat Summitt. During her tenure at UT, her record was 783–245. Between January 1978 and January 1990, Conradt's Lady Longhorns did not lose a Southwest Conference game, a streak of 183 consecutive conference victories. From 1986 to 1991, Texas was the women's basketball attendance leader, including an NCAA record average of 8,481 for one season.

Over her career, Conradt has coached:

- 28 players who went on to play professionally
- four US Olympians
- three players who earned a combined 13 national player of the year honors
- eight Kodak All-Americans

Conradt was inducted into the Basketball Hall of Fame in 1998 and into the Women's Basketball Hall of Fame in 1999. She was only the second woman inducted into the Naismith Hall of Fame.

Conradt was succeeded as UT women's basketball head coach by Gail Goestenkors, the former women's basketball head coach at Duke University.

In 2008, Conradt was honored, along with Dick Vitale, by the Atlanta Tipoff Club, with the Naismith Award, an honor presented annually that "pays tribute to the individuals who have made a significant impact on women's and men's college basketball".

After retiring from coaching, Conradt continued to work for the University of Texas as special assistant to the women's athletic director.

== Head coaching record ==
=== Basketball ===
Record table
Season	Team	Overall	Conference	Standing	Postseason
Sam Houston State Bearkats (TAIAW) (1969–1973)
1969–70	Sam Houston State	17–2			
1970–71	Sam Houston State	18–7			
1971–72	Sam Houston State	19–7			
1972–73	Sam Houston State	20–7			
Sam Houston State:		74–23 (.763)			
UT Arlington Mavericks (Independent) (1973–1976)
1973–74	UT Arlington	9–14			
1974–75	UT Arlington	11–14			
1975–76	UT Arlington	23–11			
UT Arlington:		43–39 (.524)			
Texas Longhorns (Independent) (1976–1982)
1976–77	Texas	36–10			AIAW Region 4 Tournament
1977–78	Texas	29–10			NWIT Runner-Up
1978–79	Texas	37–4			AIAW Region 4 Tournament
1979–80	Texas	33–4			AIAW Second Round
1980–81	Texas	28–8			AIAW First Round
1981–82	Texas	35–4			AIAW Runner-Up
Texas Longhorns (Southwest Conference) (1982–1996)
1982–83	Texas	30–3	8–0	1st	NCAA Elite Eight
1983–84	Texas	32–3	16–0	1st	NCAA Elite Eight
1984–85	Texas	28–3	16–0	1st	NCAA Sweet Sixteen
1985–86	Texas	34–0	16–0	1st	NCAA Champions
1986–87	Texas	31–2	16–0	1st	NCAA final Four
1987–88	Texas	32–3	16–0	1st	NCAA Elite Eight
1988–89	Texas	27–5	16–0	1st	NCAA Elite Eight
1989–90	Texas	27–5	15–1	T-1st	NCAA Elite Eight
1990–91	Texas	21–9	14–2	2nd	NCAA first round
1991–92	Texas	21–10	11–3	3rd	NCAA second round (Bye)
1992–93	Texas	22–8	13–1	T-1st	NCAA second round (Bye)
1993–94	Texas	22–9	10–4	3rd	NCAA second round
1994–95	Texas	12–16	7–7	T-4th	
1995–96	Texas	21–9	13–1	T-1st	NCAA second round
Texas Longhorns (Big 12 Conference) (1996–2007)
1996–97	Texas	22–8	12–4	T-2nd	NCAA second round
1997–98	Texas	12–15	7–9	7th	
1998–99	Texas	16–12	10–6	4th	NCAA first round
1999–2000	Texas	21–13	9–7	6th	NCAA first round
2000–01	Texas	20–13	7–9	7th	NCAA first round
2001–02	Texas	22–10	10–6	5tt	NCAA Sweet Sixteen
2002–03	Texas	29–6	15–1	1st	NCAA final Four
2003–04	Texas	30–5	14–2	T-1st	NCAA Sweet Sixteen
2004–05	Texas	22–9	13–3	2nd	NCAA second round
2005–06	Texas	13–15	7–9	T-8th	
2006–07	Texas	18–14	6–10	T-7th	
Texas:		783–245 (.762)	SWC: 187-19 (.908); Big 12: 243-159 (.604)		
Total:		900–307 (.746)			
National champion Postseason invitational champion Conference regular season champion Conference regular season and conference tournament champion Division regular season champion Division regular season and conference tournament champion Conference tournament champion

=== Volleyball ===
Record table
Season	Team	Overall	Conference	Standing	Postseason
UT Arlington Mavericks (AIAW) (1973–1975)
1973	UT Arlington	27–9–3			T-9th AIAW National Tournament
1974	UT Arlington	44–6–3			7th AIAW National Tournament
1975	UT Arlington	34–14–2			AIAW National Tournament
UT Arlington:		105–29–8 (.768)			
Texas Longhorns (TAIAW) (1976–1977)
1976	Texas	28–19–5		2nd	AIAW National Qualifier
1977	Texas	34–19–2		4th	
Texas:		62–38–7 (.612)			
Total:		167–67–15 (.701)			
National champion Postseason invitational champion Conference regular season champion Conference regular season and conference tournament champion Division regular season champion Division regular season and conference tournament champion Conference tournament champion

== Awards and honors ==
- 1984 - Russell Athletic/WBCA National Coach of the Year
- 1986 - Russell Athletic/WBCA National Coach of the Year
- 1986 - Texas Women's Hall of Fame
- 1998 - Naismith Memorial Basketball Hall of Fame
- 1999 - Inducted into the Inaugural class at the Women's Basketball Hall of Fame
- 1995 - International Women's Sports Hall of Fame
- 1995 International Scholar-Athlete Hall of Fame
- 1997 - Texas Sports Hall of Fame
- 1987 Carol Eckman Award - Women's Basketball Coaches Association
- 1991 Outstanding Commitment to Women's Athletics - National Association for Girls and Women in Sports
- 2000 UT Women's Athletics Hall of Honor
- 2003 Harvey Penick Award for Excellence in the Game of Life - Caritas of Austin
- 2004 CASEY Award - Kansas City Sports Association
- Conference Coach of the Year - 1984, 1985, 1986, 1987, 1988, 1996, 2003, 2004
- AIAW National Coach of the Year - 1980
- WBCA National Coach of the Year Award - 1984, 1986
- John and Nellie Wooden Women's Coach of the Year Award - 1997
- 2010 Lifetime Achievement Award by National Association Collegiate Women Athletics Administrators (NACWAA)

== See also ==
- List of college women's basketball career coaching wins leaders
