= 1986 NCAA Division I women's basketball tournament =

American college basketball tournament

- Teams: 40
- Finals site: Rupp Arena, Lexington, Kentucky
- Champions: Texas (1st title, 1st title game, 1st Final Four)
- Runner-up: USC (3rd title game, 3rd Final Four)
- Semifinalists: Western Kentucky (2nd Final Four); Tennessee (3rd Final Four)
- Winning coach: Jody Conradt (1st title)
- MOP: Clarissa Davis (Texas)

The 1986 NCAA Division I women's basketball tournament began on March 12 and ended on March 30. The tournament expanded to 40 teams from 32. The Final Four consisted of Texas, Tennessee, Western Kentucky, and USC, with Texas defeating Southern California, 97–81 in the championship game. Texas's Clarissa Davis was named the Most Outstanding Player of the tournament. With their championship win, Texas completed the first undefeated season (34–0) since the NCAA began sponsoring women's basketball in 1982.

ESPN expanded their coverage to show all four Regional finals and the National semifinals. CBS continued to broadcast the Championship game.

== Notable events ==
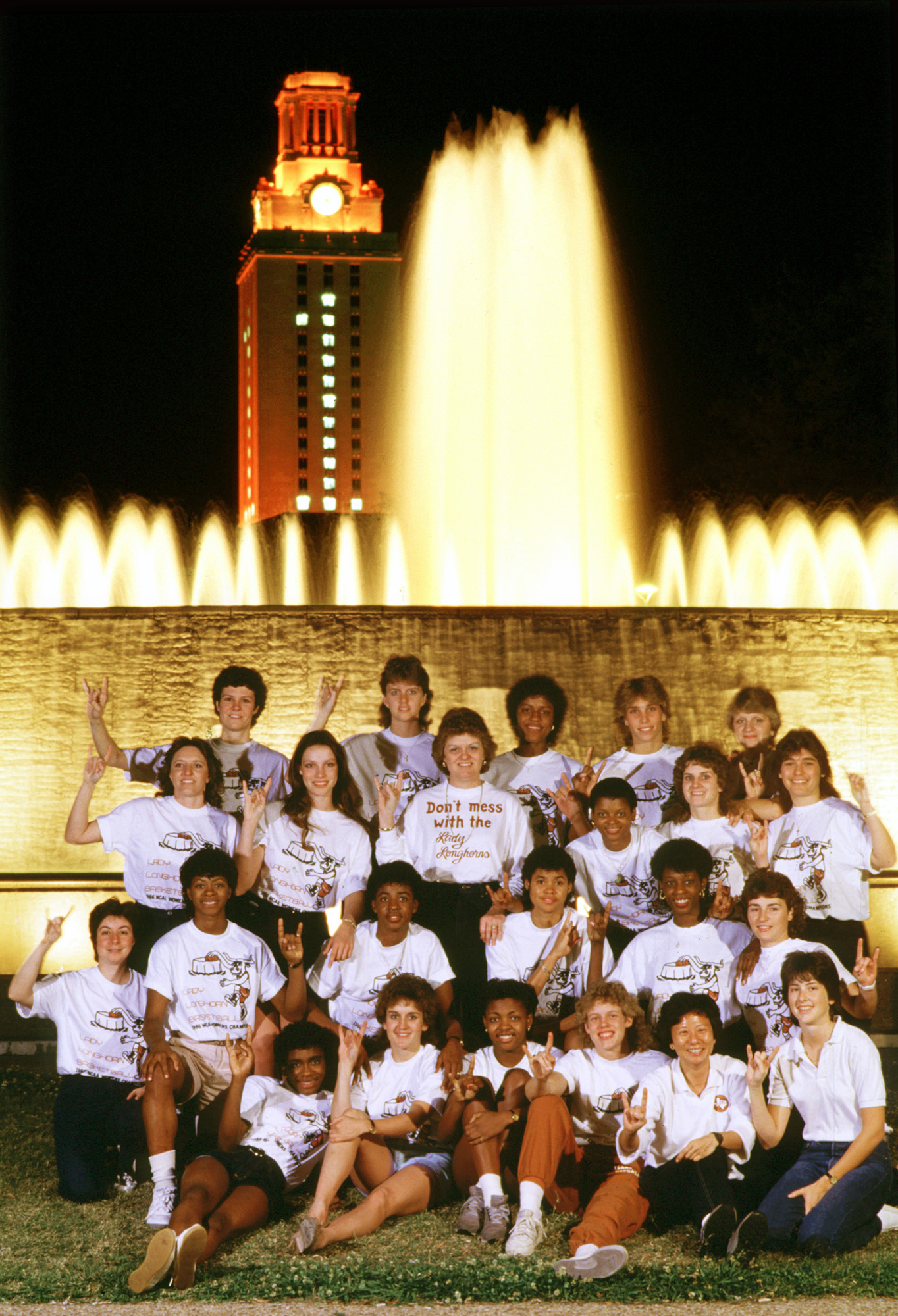
The Texas team, in front of the main tower, lit up with #1

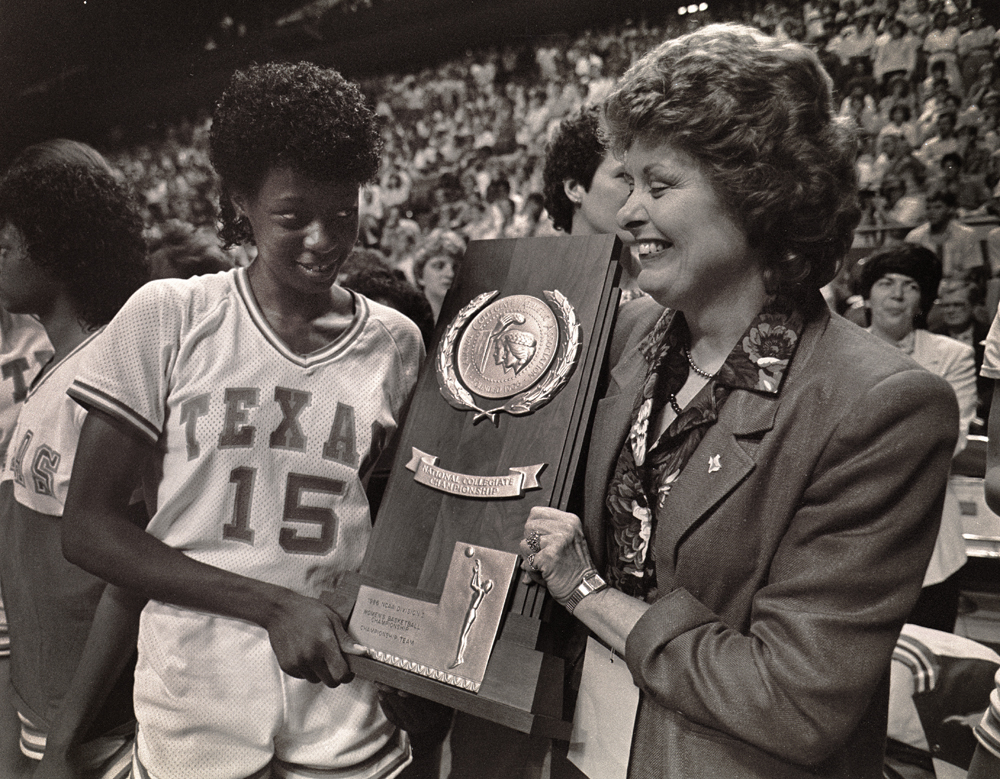
Annette Smith and Jody Conradt with the National Championship trophy

James Madison opened their regular season with a game against Virginia, which the Cavaliers won by 14 points, 71–57. James Madison went on to a regular season record of 26–3, which earned them an 8 seed in the Tournament. As the higher seed, they were eligible to play their first-round game at home, but they were unable to host, so played their opponent, Providence at the home court of Providence. James Madison won the close game 55–53, to move on to the second round. Their opponent would be Virginia, who earned a number 1 seed in the tournament. The game started out with the Cavaliers taking five points with just over eleven minutes to go in the first half. The JMU Dukes then held Virginia to only a single field goal for the rest of the half and took an eleven-point lead at halftime. The two teams would play roughly evenly in the second half, with Virginia only managing to reduce the lead by two points. James Madison won the game 71–62, advancing to the regional semifinal, which was the first time in the five-year history of the NCAA Tournament that a team had defeated a number 1 seed prior to the Regional round.

After earning a number one national ranking in 1984, but stumbling in the regional's finals to national power Louisiana Tech, Texas seemed poised for a better result in 1985. Not only did the team earn another top national ranking, but they entered the NCAA Tournament knowing that if they reached the Final Four, they would have the home court advantage with the final games scheduled for their own Frank Erwin Center. Home court would play a part, but not the part hoped for by the Longhorns. In the regional semi-finals, played at the home court of Western Kentucky University, the Hilltoppers stymied the Longhorn's hopes with a 92–90 victory. They would return to the 1986 tournament viewed as one of the top teams in the nation and were once again ranked the top team in the nation, but they still did not have a Final Four NCAA appearance on their resume.

The Texas team won their first game easily, then continued to the regional, this time on their home court. They dispatched Oklahoma easily, then struggled against Ole Miss, who were trying to prevent the team from a Final Four yet again. This time, Texas prevailed and beat Ole Miss by three points to head to their first NCAA Final Four. Their opponent in the semifinal was none other than Western Kentucky, who had denied them the previous year. This time, the result would be very different, as the Longhorns beat Western Kentucky easily, 90–65.

The other semifinal pitted Tennessee against Southern California. Cheryl Miller was the best player at USC, and had led the team to the national championship in 1984. Miller went on to play for the USA national team and helped the USA win the gold medal at the 1984 Olympics. 1986 was Miller's senior year at USC. The game between Tennessee and USC was a rematch of a physical game played in December, in which Miller was thrown out of the game for an elbow. The game was close, but USC ended up with an 85–77 win. In the rematch, Miller would again come out of the game, but under very different circumstances. She was worried about getting hurt, and with a 70–51 lead, didn't need to stay in. In that game, USC won by 24 points, 83–59.

That set up the championship game between USC and undefeated Texas. The Texas team was very deep but had suffered a number of injuries during the year. The game was close early with the Trojans leading at times in the first half, but Texas went on a 10–2 run to take a seven-point lead. Miller would have one of the worst games in her career. Although she scored 16 points, twelve of those were from the free throw line. She was only 2 for 11 from the field, without a single point in the second half. In contrast, Texas' Clarissa Davis came off the bench to score 25 and earn Most Outstanding Player honors. USC's Cynthia Cooper scored 27 points, and Texas won the national championship 97–81 to complete the first undefeated season in NCAA history.

== Records ==
Cheryl Miller set the Final Four record of free throws in a single game with 12, in the championship game.

Clarissa Davis set the Final Four record for rebounds in a half, with 14 in the second half of the semifinal game.

The National Championship game between Texas and USC set several Final Four scoring marks:

- Most points by one team – 97
- Most points combined by both teams – 178
- Most field goals in a game – 40

Texas had 23 assists in the semi-final game, a record (since 1985, when the category was established), and followed that with 22 in the championship game.

Kamie Ethridge had 20 assists in the two Final Four games, a record for the combined Final Four games.

== Qualifying teams – automatic ==
Forty teams were selected to participate in the 1986 NCAA Tournament. Seventeen conferences were eligible for an automatic bid to the 1986 NCAA tournament.

Automatic bids
		Record		
Qualifying School	Conference	Regular Season	Conference	Seed
Pennsylvania State University	Atlantic 10	23–7	12–4	3
University of Maryland, College Park	ACC	17–12	6–8	6
Villanova University	Big East	21–7	12–4	7
University of Missouri	Big Eight	19–11	8–6	9
Ohio State University	Big Ten	22–6	16–2	3
University of Utah	High Country	21–7	11–1	9
University of South Carolina	Metro	19–10	9–1	7
La Salle University	MAAC	21–8	10–2	10
Ohio University	MAC	26–2	16–2	9
University of Southern Illinois	Missouri Valley Conference	25–3	18–0	6
University of Montana	Mountain West Athletic	26–8	13–1	8
Middle Tennessee State University	Ohio Valley Conference	19–9	13–1	10
University of Georgia	SEC	29–1	9–0	1
University of North Texas	Southland	20–9	7–3	10
University of Texas at Austin	Southwest	29–0	16–0	1
Western Kentucky University	Sun Belt Conference	29–3	6–0	4
University of Nevada, Las Vegas	Pacific Coast	22–8	11–3	5

== Qualifying teams – at-large ==
Twenty-three additional teams were selected to complete the forty invitations.

At-large bids
		Record		
Qualifying school	Conference	Regular Season	Conference	Seed
Rutgers University	Atlantic 10	27–3	16–0	2
Saint Joseph's University	Atlantic 10	22–6	12–4	5
University of North Carolina at Chapel Hill	Atlantic Coast	22–8	10–4	4
North Carolina State University	Atlantic Coast	18–10	9–5	6
University of Virginia	Atlantic Coast	26–2	13–1	1
Providence College	Big East	24–5	14–2	9
University of Oklahoma	Big Eight	23–6	10–4	4
University of Illinois at Urbana–Champaign	Big Ten	19–9	12–6	8
University of Iowa	Big Ten	22–6	15–3	5
James Madison University	Colonial	26–3	11–1	8
Louisiana Tech University	Independent	25–4	-–-	2
Drake University	Missouri Valley	21–7	16–2	10
University of Washington	Northern Pacific	23–5	10–2	7
California State University, Long Beach	Pacific Coast	28–4	14–0	3
University of Southern California	Pacific West	27–4	8–0	1
Auburn University	Southeastern	23–5	6–3	3
University of Kentucky	Southeastern	18–10	4–5	7
Louisiana State University	Southeastern	25–5	6–3	2
University of Mississippi (Ole Miss)	Southeastern	22–7	6–3	2
University of Tennessee	Southeastern	21–9	5–4	4
Vanderbilt University	Southeastern	22–8	4–5	5
University of Arkansas	Southwest	22–7	13–3	8
Texas Tech University	Southwest	21–8	13–3	6

== Bids by conference ==
Twenty-one conferences earned an automatic bid. In thirteen cases, the automatic bid was the only representative from the conference. Eighteen additional at-large teams were selected from seven of the conferences, plus one independent (not associated with an athletic conference) team earned at-large bids.

Bids	Conference	Teams
7	Southeastern	Auburn, Georgia, Kentucky, LSU, Ole Miss, Tennessee, Vanderbilt
4	Atlantic Coast	Maryland, North Carolina, North Carolina St., Virginia
3	Southwest	Arkansas, Texas Tech, Texas
3	Big Ten	Illinois, Iowa, Ohio St.
3	Atlantic 10	Penn St., Rutgers, St. Joseph's
2	Big East	Providence, Villanova
2	Big Eight	Missouri, Oklahoma
2	Missouri Valley	Drake, Southern Ill.
2	Pacific Coast	Long Beach St., UNLV
1	Pacific West	Southern California
1	Ohio Valley	Middle Tenn.
1	Northern Pacific	Washington
1	Mountain West Athletic	Montana
1	Mid-American	Ohio
1	Metro	South Carolina
1	Metro Atlantic	La Salle
1	Independent	Louisiana Tech
1	High Country	Utah
1	Sun Belt	Western Kentucky
1	Colonial	James Madison

== First and second rounds ==
In 1986, the field expanded to 40 teams. The teams were seeded, and assigned to four geographic regions, with seeds 1–10 in each region. In Round 1, seeds 8 and 9 faced each other for the opportunity to face the 1 seed in the second round, while seeds 7 and 10 faced each other for the opportunity to face the 2 seed. In the first two rounds, the higher seed was given the opportunity to host the first-round game. In most cases, the higher seed accepted the opportunity. The exceptions:

- Illinois was an eight seed, but chose not to host, so the game was played at nine seed Ohio
- James Madison, the eight seed, played ninth seeded Providence at Providence
- Arkansas, the eight seed, played ninth seeded Missouri at Missouri
- Kentucky, the seven seed, played the tenth seeded Drake at Drake

The following table lists the region, host school, venue and the twenty-four first round locations:

1986 NCAA first round
1986 NCAA second round

Region	Rnd	Host	Venue	City	State
East	1	Providence College	Alumni Hall (Providence)	Providence	Rhode Island
East	1	Villanova University	Palestra	Philadelphia	Pennsylvania
East	2	Pennsylvania State University	Recreation Building (Rec Hall)	University Park	Pennsylvania
East	2	University of Virginia	University Hall (University of Virginia)	Charlottesville	Virginia
East	2	Western Kentucky University	E.A. Diddle Arena	Bowling Green	Kentucky
East	2	Rutgers University	Louis Brown Athletic Center	Piscataway	New Jersey
Mideast	1	University of South Carolina	Carolina Coliseum	Columbia	South Carolina
Mideast	1	Ohio University	Convocation Center	Athens	Ohio
Mideast	2	University of Georgia	Georgia Coliseum (Stegeman Coliseum)	Athens	Georgia
Mideast	2	Louisiana State University	LSU Assembly Center (Pete Maravich Assembly Center)	Baton Rouge	Louisiana
Mideast	2	Ohio State University	St. John Arena	Columbus	Ohio
Mideast	2	University of Tennessee	Stokely Athletic Center	Knoxville	Tennessee
Midwest	1	Drake University	Drake Fieldhouse	Des Moines	Iowa
Midwest	1	University of Missouri	Hearnes Center	Columbia	Missouri
Midwest	2	Auburn University	Memorial Coliseum (Beard–Eaves–Memorial Coliseum)	Auburn	Alabama
Midwest	2	University of Oklahoma	Lloyd Noble Center	Norman	Oklahoma
Midwest	2	University of Texas	Frank Erwin Center	Austin	Texas
Midwest	2	University of Mississippi (Ole Miss)	Tad Smith Coliseum	Oxford	Mississippi
West	1	University of Montana	Dahlberg Arena	Missoula	Montana
West	1	University of Washington	Hec Edmundson Pavilion	Seattle	Washington
West	2	University of North Carolina	Carmichael Auditorium	Chapel Hill	North Carolina
West	2	Long Beach State	University Gym (Gold Mine)	Long Beach	California
West	2	University of Southern California	Los Angeles Memorial Sports Arena	Los Angeles	California
West	2	Louisiana Tech University	Thomas Assembly Center	Ruston	Louisiana

== Regionals and Final Four ==
1986 NCAA regionals and Final Four

The regionals, named for the general location, were held from March 20 to March 23 at these sites:

- Midwest Regional Frank Erwin Center, Austin, Texas (Host: University of Texas)
- East Regional Palestra, Philadelphia (Host: Villanova University)
- Mideast Regional Carver–Hawkeye Arena, Iowa City, Iowa (Host: University of Iowa)
- West Regional Long Beach Arena, Long Beach, California (Host: Long Beach State)

Each regional winner advanced to the Final Four, held March 28 and March 30 in Lexington, Kentucky at Rupp Arena. The University of Kentucky served as the host institution.

== Bids by state ==
The forty teams came from twenty-five states. Pennsylvania had the most teams with four. Twenty-five states did not have any teams receiving bids.

NCAA Women's basketball Tournament invitations by state 1986

Bids	State	Teams
4	Pennsylvania	Penn St, Villanova, La Salle, St Joseph's
3	Tennessee	Middle Tenn, Tennessee, Vanderbilt
3	Texas	North Texas, Texas, Texas Tech
2	California	Long Beach St, Southern California
2	Illinois	Illinois, Southern Illinois
2	Iowa	Iowa, Drake
2	Kentucky	Western Kentucky, Kentucky
2	Louisiana	Louisiana Tech, LSU
2	North Carolina	North Carolina, North Carolina St
2	Ohio	Ohio St, Ohio
2	Virginia	Virginia, James Madison
1	Alabama	Auburn
1	Arkansas	Arkansas
1	Georgia	Georgia
1	Maryland	Maryland
1	Mississippi	Ole Miss
1	Missouri	Missouri
1	Montana	Montana
1	Nevada	UNLV
1	New Jersey	Rutgers
1	Oklahoma	Oklahoma
1	Rhode Island	Providence
1	South Carolina	South Carolina
1	Utah	Utah
1	Washington	Washington

== Brackets ==
Games played at better seed except where noted.

=== East regional – Philadelphia, Pennsylvania (Palestra) ===
First round March 12
8	James Madison	55
9	at Providence	53
7	Villanova	60
10	La Salle	55

Second round March 14–16
8	James Madison	71
1	Virginia	62
5	St. Joseph's	65
4	Western Kentucky	74
7	Villanova	58
2	Rutgers	85
3	Penn State	63
6	North Carolina State	59

Regional semifinals March 20–21
8	James Madison	51
4	Western Kentucky	72
2	Rutgers	85
3	Penn State	72

Regional finals March 22
4	Western Kentucky	89
2	Rutgers	74

=== Midwest regional – University of Texas – Austin, Texas (Frank Erwin Center) ===
First round March 12
8	Arkansas	65
9	at Missouri	66
7	Kentucky	70
10	at Drake	73

Second round March 14–16
9	Missouri	67
1	Texas	108
5	Vanderbilt	67
4	Oklahoma	86
10	Drake	71
2	Ole Miss	84
3	Auburn	61
6	Southern Illinois	39

Regional semifinals March 20–21
1	Texas	85
4	Oklahoma	59
2	Ole Miss	56
3	Auburn	55

Regional finals March 23
1	Texas	66
2	Ole Miss	63

=== Mideast regional – University of Iowa, Iowa City, Iowa (Carver–Hawkeye Arena) ===
First round March 12
8	Illinois	69
9	at Ohio	68
7	South Carolina	77
10	Middle Tennessee State	78

Second round March 14–16
8	Illinois	64
1	Georgia	103
5	Iowa	68
4	Tennessee	73
10	Middle Tennessee State	65
2	LSU	78
3	Ohio State	87
6	Maryland	71

Regional semifinals March 20–21
1	Georgia	82
4	Tennessee	85
2	LSU	81
3	Ohio State	80

Regional finals March 23
4	Tennessee	67
2	LSU	65

=== West regional – Long Beach State University – Long Beach, California (Long Beach Arena) ===
First round March 12
8	Montana	58
9	Utah	46
7	Washington	69
10	North Texas State	54

Second round March 14–16
8	Montana	50
1	USC	81
5	UNLV	76
4	North Carolina	82
7	Washington	54
2	Louisiana Tech	79
3	Long Beach State	78
6	Texas Tech	73 (OT)

Regional semifinals March 20–21
1	USC	84
4	North Carolina	70
2	Louisiana Tech	71
3	Long Beach State	69

Regional finals March 23
1	USC	80
2	Louisiana Tech	64

=== Final Four – Lexington, Kentucky (Rupp Arena) ===
National semifinals March 28
4E	Western Kentucky	65
1MW	Texas	90
4ME	Tennessee	59
1W	USC	83

National championship March 30
1MW	Texas	97
1W	USC	81

== Record by conference ==
Sixteen conferences had more than one bid, or at least one win in NCAA Tournament play:

Conference	# of Bids	Record	Win %	Round of 32	Sweet Sixteen	Elite Eight	Final Four	Championship Game
Southeastern	7	9–7	.563	6	5	3	1	–
Atlantic Coast	4	1–4	.200	4	1	–	–	–
Southwest	3	5–2	.714	2	1	1	1	1
Atlantic 10	3	3–3	.500	3	2	1	–	–
Big Ten	3	2–3	.400	3	1	–	–	–
Big Eight	2	2–2	.500	2	1	–	–	–
Pacific Coast	2	1–2	.333	2	1	–	–	–
Big East	2	1–2	.333	1	–	–	–	–
Pacific West	1	4–1	.800	1	1	1	1	1
Sun Belt	1	3–1	.750	1	1	1	1	–
Colonial	1	2–1	.667	1	1	–	–	–
Independent	1	2–1	.667	1	1	1	–	–
Missouri Valley	1	1–1	.500	1	–	–	–	–
Mountain West Athletic	1	1–1	.500	1	–	–	–	–
Northern Pacific	1	1–1	.500	1	–	–	–	–
Ohio Valley	1	1–1	.500	1	–	–	–	–

Seven conferences went 0-1: Gateway, High Country, Metro, MAAC, MAC, Southland, and WAC

== All-Tournament team ==
- Clarissa Davis, University of Texas at Austin
- Fran Harris, University of Texas at Austin
- Cheryl Miller, University of Southern California
- Cynthia Cooper, University of Southern California
- Clemette Haskins, Western Kentucky University

== Game officials ==
- Kit Robinson (semifinal)
- June Courteau (semifinal)
- Bob Olsen (semifinal)
- Bill Stokes (semifinal)

== See also ==
- 1986 NCAA Division I men's basketball tournament
- 1986 NCAA Division II women's basketball tournament
- 1986 NCAA Division III women's basketball tournament
- 1986 NAIA women's basketball tournament
