= 1987 NCAA Division I women's basketball championship game =

Women's basketball championship game

NCAA Division I women's basketball championship game
National championship game
Tennessee Lady Volunteers	Louisiana Tech Lady Techsters
(27–6)	(30–2)
67	44
Head coach: Pat Summitt	Head coach: Leon Barmore
- AP: 7
- Coaches: 7
- AP: 3
- Coaches: 3
	1st half	2nd half	Total
Tennessee Lady Volunteers	33	34	67
Louisiana Tech Lady Techsters	24	20	44
- Date: March 29, 1987
- Venue: Frank Erwin Center, Austin, Texas
- MVP: Tonya Edwards, Tennessee

United States TV coverage
- Network: CBS
- Announcers: Tim Brant (play-by-play) and Mimi Griffin (analyst)

The 1987 NCAA Division I women's basketball championship game was the final game of the 1987 NCAA Division I women's basketball tournament. It determined the champion of the 1986–87 NCAA Division I women's basketball season and was contested by the Tennessee Lady Volunteers and the Louisiana Tech Lady Techsters. The game was played on March 29, 1987, at the Frank Erwin Center in Austin, Texas. After leading 33–24 at halftime, No. 7 Tennessee pulled away to defeat No. 3 Louisiana Tech 67–44 to capture the program's first NCAA national championship. Tonya Edwards was named the tournament's Most Outstanding Player.

== Participants ==
=== Tennessee Lady Volunteers ===
The Lady Vols, who represented the University of Tennessee in Knoxville, Tennessee, were led by head coach Pat Summitt in her 13th season at the school. Tennessee began the season ranked No. 3 in the AP Poll. After peaking at No. 1 in the polls for the last three weeks of 1986, the team remained in the top 10 all season long and finished the regular season at No. 7 in both major polls.

Playing as the No. 2 seed in the Mideast region of the NCAA tournament, the Lady Volunteers defeated Tennessee Tech, No. 11 Virginia, and No. 2 Auburn to reach the fourth Final Four in program history. In the National semifinals, Tennessee defeated No. 4 Long Beach State, 74–64. The 27–6 Lady Vols entered the matchup with No. 3 Louisiana Tech as the underdog.

=== Louisiana Tech Lady Techsters ===
The Lady Techsters, who represented the Louisiana Tech University in Ruston, Louisiana, were led by head coach Leon Barmore, in his 2nd season as head coach at the school. Louisiana Tech opened the season ranked No. 2 in the AP poll and, like Tennessee, spent the entirety of the season inside the top 10. They finished the regular season ranked No. 3 in both major polls.

In the NCAA tournament, La Tech defeated Northwestern, Southern Illinois, and No. 9 Iowa to reach the fourth NCAA Final Four in program history. They won 79–75 over No. 1 and defending National champion Texas in the national semifinal to reach the national championship game with a 30–2 record.

== Starting lineups ==
Tennessee	Position	Louisiana Tech
Shelley Sexton	G	Teresa Weatherspoon
Tonya Edwards	G	Angela Lawson
Kathy Spinks	C	Tori Harrison
Bridgette Gordon	F	Nora Lewis
Karla Horton	F	

== Game summary ==
CBS

March 29, 1987

No. 7 Tennessee Lady Volunteers 67, No. 3 Louisiana Tech Lady Techsters 44
Scoring by half: 33–24, 34–20
Pts: Rebs: Asts:	Pts: Rebs: Asts:

Frank Erwin Center – Austin, Texas

== Media coverage ==
The game was broadcast on CBS.
