= 1987 Pacific Coast Athletic Association women's basketball tournament =

- Classification: Division I
- Teams: 8
- Site: The Forum; Inglewood, California
- Quarterfinals site: Campus sites Campus sites
- Champions: Long Beach State (1st title)
- Winning coach: Joan Bonvicini (1st title)
- MVP: Penny Toler (Long Beach State)

1986–87 Pacific Coast Athletic Association women's basketball standings
	Conf.				Overall
Team	W		L	PCT	W		L	PCT
No. 4 Long Beach State †	17	–	1	.944	33	–	3	.917
Hawaii	13	–	5	.722	21	–	7	.750
UNLV	13	–	5	.722	21	–	9	.700
Fresno State	12	–	6	.667	22	–	8	.733
UC Irvine	10	–	8	.556	14	–	15	.483
Cal State Fullerton	9	–	9	.500	12	–	16	.429
San Diego State	9	–	9	.500	13	–	16	.448
Pacific	5	–	13	.278	12	–	16	.429
UC Santa Barbara	1	–	17	.056	4	–	22	.154
San Jose State	1	–	17	.056	3	–	23	.115
† 1987 PCAA tournament winner Rankings from AP Poll

The 1987 Pacific Coast Athletic Association women's basketball tournament took place March 4–7, 1987. The quarterfinal round was played at the home arena of the higher seed, while the semifinals and championship were held at The Forum in Inglewood, California. Long Beach State cruised to the tournament title and received the conference's automatic bid to the 1987 NCAA Women's Division I Basketball Tournament. The 49ers would go on to reach the Final Four.

== Format ==
The top eight teams, out of ten, from the regular season standings qualified for the tournament.

All eight participating teams were placed into the first round, with teams seeded and paired based on regular-season records. After the first round, teams were re-seeded so the highest-remaining team was paired with the lowest-remaining time in one semifinal with the other two teams slotted into the other semifinal.

== Bracket ==
Quarterfinals; Wednesday, March 5
1	Long Beach State	123
8	Pacific	65
4	Fresno State	64
5	UC Irvine	49
(Pairings are reseeded after the first round)
3	UNLV	85
6	Cal State Fullerton	51
2	Hawaii	62
7	San Diego State	68

Semifinals (Re-Seeded); Friday, March 6
1	Long Beach State	108
7	San Diego State	74
4	Fresno State	69
3	UNLV	86

Championship game Saturday, March 7
1	Long Beach State	98
3	UNLV	57

== All-Tournament Team ==
- Cindy Brown, Long Beach State
- Angela Christian, UNLV
- Shannon McGee, Fresno State
- Brook Meadows, San Diego State
- Shannon Smith, Long Beach State
- Penny Toler, Long Beach State (MVP)
