= Tennessee Lady Volunteers basketball =

Women's college basketball team

2026–27 Tennessee Lady Volunteers basketball team
- University: University of Tennessee
- Athletic director: Danny White
- Head coach: Kim Caldwell (3rd season)
- Location: Knoxville, Tennessee
- Arena: Thompson–Boling Arena at Food City Center (capacity: 21,678)
- Conference: SEC
- Nickname: Lady Vols
- Colors: Orange and white

NCAA Division I tournament champions
- 1987, 1989, 1991, 1996, 1997, 1998, 2007, 2008
Other NCAA Division I tournament results
Runner-up	1984, 1995, 2000, 2003, 2004
Final Four	1982, 1984, 1986, 1987, 1988, 1989, 1991, 1995, 1996, 1997, 1998, 2000, 2002, 2003, 2004, 2005, 2007, 2008
Elite Eight	1982, 1983, 1984, 1986, 1987, 1988, 1989, 1990, 1991, 1993, 1995, 1996, 1997, 1998, 1999, 2000, 2002, 2003, 2004, 2005, 2006, 2007, 2008, 2011, 2012, 2013, 2015, 2016
Sweet Sixteen	1982, 1983, 1984, 1985, 1986, 1987, 1988, 1989, 1990, 1991, 1992, 1993, 1994, 1995, 1996, 1997, 1998, 1999, 2000, 2001, 2002, 2003, 2004, 2005, 2006, 2007, 2008, 2010, 2011, 2012, 2013, 2014, 2015, 2016, 2022, 2023, 2025
Appearances	1982, 1983, 1984, 1985, 1986, 1987, 1988, 1989, 1990, 1991, 1992, 1993, 1994, 1995, 1996, 1997, 1998, 1999, 2000, 2001, 2002, 2003, 2004, 2005, 2006, 2007, 2008, 2009, 2010, 2011, 2012, 2013, 2014, 2015, 2016, 2017, 2018, 2019, 2021, 2022, 2023, 2024, 2025, 2026

AIAW tournament runner-up
- 1980, 1981
Other AIAW tournament results
Final Four	1977, 1979, 1980, 1981
Quarterfinals	1977, 1979, 1980, 1981
Second round	1977, 1979, 1980, 1981
Appearances	1977, 1978, 1979, 1980, 1981

Conference tournament champions
- 1980, 1985, 1988, 1989, 1992, 1994, 1996, 1998, 1999, 2000, 2005, 2006, 2008, 2010, 2011, 2012, 2014

Conference regular-season champions
- 1980, 1985, 1990, 1993, 1994, 1995, 1998, 1999, 2000, 2001, 2002, 2003, 2004, 2007, 2010, 2011, 2013, 2015

Uniforms
Home	Away

The Tennessee Lady Volunteers basketball team represents the University of Tennessee in Knoxville, Tennessee in NCAA women's basketball competition. The team has competed for national titles for over forty years, having made every NCAA Women's Division I Basketball Championship tournament since the NCAA began sanctioning women's sports in the 1981–82 season.

The team is commonly referred to as the Lady Vols; the formal "Volunteers" nickname is regularly shortened by many fans of both men's and women's teams to "Vols". The university considers either "Lady Volunteers" or "Lady Vols" acceptable.

The Lady Vols have won at least a share of the SEC regular season championship 17 times (most recently in 2015), won 17 SEC tournament championships (with the most recent occurrence being in 2014), made 18 Final Four appearances (most recently in 2008), and won 8 national championships (with the most recent being in 2008).

== Overview ==
The Lady Vols were coached by Pat Summitt for over four decades. Under Summitt, the Lady Vols won numerous SEC titles, appeared in 18 NCAA Final Fours and 4 AIAW Final Fours, and won 8 NCAA titles including an undefeated season. Additionally, Tennessee is the only team to have appeared in all 36 NCAA Tournaments, including 34 Sweet 16 appearances (23 of which were consecutive). Summitt's teams were known for participating in a grueling regular season schedule, often toughest in the nation, in order to prepare the team for the NCAA tournament. This tough schedule has caused Tennessee to build up rivalries with many prominent teams, including Texas, Stanford, Louisiana Tech, Old Dominion, and, most notably, Connecticut. Like other Tennessee teams, the Lady Vols compete in the SEC, which is historically a competitive conference producing several NCAA Championship teams this century. Within the conference, Tennessee's main rivals are LSU, Vanderbilt, Kentucky and Georgia, with the series vs. South Carolina and Mississippi State gaining importance due to the emergence of those schools as national powers. Summitt led Tennessee to 1,098 victories, with an 84.2% win rate. The numbers at home are even stronger, as Tennessee has won 91% of home games and 93.1% of in-conference home games.

== Roster ==
2026–27 Tennessee Lady Volunteers women's basketball team
Players
Coaches

Pos.	#	Name	Height	Year	Previous school	Hometown
G	0	Kaylene Smikle	6 ft 0 in (1.83 m)	Sr	Maryland	Bay Shore, NY
G	1	Avery Mills	5 ft 9 in (1.75 m)	Jr	Liberty	Lynchburg, VA
G	2	Harissoum Coulibaly	5 ft 10 in (1.78 m)	So	Auburn	Paris, France
G	4	Gabby Minus	6 ft 0 in (1.83 m)	Fr	Hebron Christian Academy	Kathleen, GA
F	8	Zhen Craft	6 ft 2 in (1.88 m)	So	Georgia	Waldorf, MD
G	9	Shaelyn Steele	5 ft 6 in (1.68 m)	Jr	Penn State	Ashland, KY
G	10	Jada Eads	5 ft 7 in (1.7 m)	Jr	Seton Hall	Orlando, FL
G	11	Irene Oboavwoduo	5 ft 10 in (1.78 m)	Fr	Trinity Church of England	Manchester, England
G	14	Rylie Theuerkauf	5 ft 9 in (1.75 m)	Sr	Georgia	Tenafly, NJ
F	15	Harper Peterson	6 ft 3 in (1.91 m)	So	Stanford	Rocklin, CA
F	21	Riley Makalusky	6 ft 2 in (1.88 m)	Sr	West Virginia	Fishers, IN
G	25	Naomi White	5 ft 9 in (1.75 m)	So	Northern Arizona	Omaha, NE
F	31	Aaliyah Moore	6 ft 1 in (1.85 m)	Sr	Texas	Moore, OK
G	35	Kennedy Fauntleroy	5 ft 7 in (1.7 m)	Sr	East Carolina	Upper Marlboro, MD
F	44	Fatmata Janneh	6 ft 2 in (1.88 m)	Sr	Texas A&M	London, England

Head coach

- Kim Caldwell (Glenville State)

Assistant coach(es)

- Isoken Uzamere (Hofstra)
- Bill Ferrara (Florida)
- Jenna Burdette (Dayton)
- Angel Rizor (Cincinnati)
- Lexie Barrier (James Madison)

Legend

- (C) Team captain
- (S) Suspended
- (I) Ineligible
- (W) Walk-on
- Injured
- Current redshirt

Roster

== History ==
=== Early years and Pat Summitt’s arrival (1974–1986) ===
The Tennessee Lady Volunteers basketball program was formed in the early 1970s, initially operating at a modest scale under the university’s physical education department. The team competed in the Association for Intercollegiate Athletics for Women (AIAW) and played its games in front of small crowds at Alumni Gym and Stokely Athletic Center. In 1974, the program took a decisive turn with the hiring of Pat Head, later Pat Summitt, as head coach at the age of 22. Fresh off her playing career with the U.S. Olympic team, Summitt inherited a program with little tradition and immediately instilled a culture of intensity, defensive discipline, and national ambition.

In Summitt’s first season, the Lady Vols posted a 16–8 record, and by 1976 they had recorded their first 20-win campaign. Also in 1976, she recruited the first African American, Patricia Roberts, to play with the Lady Vols. Roberts and Summitt had previously been teammates at the Olympics. During the late 1970s the Lady Vols became a fixture in the Association for Intercollegiate Athletics for Women (AIAW). They reached the national quarterfinals in 1976 and advanced to their first Final Four in 1977. Four years later, in 1980, they returned to the AIAW Final Four, falling short of a title but cementing their place among the nation’s elite. The 1981–82 season marked a turning point as the NCAA assumed control of women’s basketball. Tennessee, playing in the inaugural NCAA tournament, upset top-seeded USC 91–90 in overtime before losing in the Final Four to eventual champion Louisiana Tech, 69–46. That game set the tone for Tennessee’s future—Summitt’s teams would never shy away from playing the toughest competition on the biggest stage.

Throughout the early 1980s, Tennessee posted heavy winning seasons and more Final Four appearances (1982, 1984, 1986) but still searched for its first national title. Players such as Holly Warlick, an All-American guard, and Cindy Brogdon, the program’s first Olympian, laid the foundation, while Summitt steadily built a reputation as one of the fiercest and most tactical coaches in the country.

=== First championships and national breakthrough (1986–1991) ===
The 1986–87 season delivered the national breakthrough Summitt and her program had been chasing. Tennessee finished the regular season 27–6 and entered the NCAA tournament as a #2 seed, considered an underdog compared to some of the established powers. However, the Lady Vols surged through the field, defeating Tennessee Tech, Virginia, Auburn, and Long Beach State before dismantling Louisiana Tech 67–44 in the championship game in Austin, Texas. Tonya Edwards was named the Final Four’s Most Outstanding Player, and Tennessee had captured its first ever national championship.

Two years later the Lady Vols captured their second national title. The 1988–89 squad, featuring Bridgette Gordon and Shelia Frost, lost only twice all season and capped its run with a 76–60 victory over Auburn in the championship game. Gordon, who scored 27 points in the final, earned Most Outstanding Player honors and became the program’s first player to graduate as both a national champion and a national star.

Tennessee made the regional final in 1990 but fell 79–75 in overtime to Virginia, a setback that only reinforced the program’s status as a perennial contender. In 1991, however, the Lady Vols reclaimed the crown in one of the most thrilling finals in NCAA history, outlasting Virginia 70–67 in overtime to win their third national championship. The back-and-forth battle, featuring Virginia’s Dawn Staley, helped elevate women’s basketball into the national spotlight and solidified Tennessee as the sport’s gold standard in the 1990s.

=== The Holdsclaw era and a three-peat (1992–1998) ===
The early 1990s saw Tennessee remain a constant fixture at the Final Four, with players like Dena Head and Daedra Charles continuing the tradition of excellence. The arrival of Chamique Holdsclaw in 1995, however, took the program to unprecedented heights. Holdsclaw, joined by Michelle Marciniak and later Tamika Catchings and Semeka Randall, ushered in a dynasty that was then unparalleled in women's college sports.

In 1994–95, Tennessee reached the national championship game but fell 70–64 to undefeated Connecticut in the first of many high-stakes clashes between the two programs. The Huskies had also defeated Tennessee at Gampel Pavilion earlier in the season in the two programs first ever meeting. A year later (1995–96), the Lady Vols rebounded, storming through the NCAA tournament and defeated Connecticut 88–83 in the National Semifinals in overtime and then Georgia 83–65 in the championship game to claim their fourth national title. Holdsclaw was named Most Outstanding Player, beginning her run as the face of 1990s women’s college basketball.

In 1996–97, The Lady Vols went 23–10 to finish the regular season and were awarded a #3 seed in the NCAA tournament. They played one of the toughest schedules in the country, and No. 1 ranked Connecticut was favored to defeat them in the Elite Eight matchup. However, the Lady Vols used furious offense to defeat UConn 91–81 and return to the Final Four. There, they defeated #6 seeded Notre Dame 80–66 and then #1 seed Old Dominion 68–59 to capture the programs fifth title and second consecutive one.

The 1997–98 season produced one of the most successful teams in women’s basketball history. Tennessee went undefeated at 39–0, besting every opponent with a combination of Holdsclaw’s scoring, Catchings’ all-around talent, and Randall’s defensive intensity. In the championship game the Lady Vols defeated Louisiana Tech 93–75, capping a perfect season and capturing their third consecutive national championship. Pat Summitt’s eleventh Final Four appearance yielded her sixth national title, and her program was universally recognized as one of the sport’s premier dynasties.

=== The UConn rivalry and missed titles (1999–2004) ===
By the end of the 1990s, Tennessee had established itself as the standard-bearer in women’s basketball, but its supremacy was soon challenged by Geno Auriemma's Connecticut Huskies. The rivalry between the two programs, first staged in 1995, quickly grew into the defining storyline of the sport. Summitt scheduled UConn as part of her philosophy of playing the nation’s best, and when the teams first met in January 1995, UConn upset Tennessee 77–66 on national television at Gampel Pavilion. That victory propelled the Huskies to their first national championship and set the stage for nearly two decades of heated competition.

From 1995 to 2007, Tennessee and Connecticut met nearly every season, often multiple times. The games routinely drew sellout crowds and set television ratings records for women’s college basketball. The programs combined for 12 national championships during this stretch, and nine times they clashed in either the Final Four or the championship game. The rivalry was fueled by the contrast between the two coaches: Summitt, with her fiery sideline demeanor and Southern discipline, and Auriemma, with his brash confidence and growing record of success.

Tennessee endured some of its most frustrating defeats at UConn’s hands during this period. After winning its third straight championship in 1998, Tennessee reached the national championship game in 2000, 2003, and 2004, only to lose all three to the Huskies. The 2000 championship saw UConn, led by Shea Ralph, Swin Cash, Sue Bird, and Asjha Jones, cruise past Tennessee 71–52. In 2002, the undefeated Huskies defeated the Lady Vols 79–56 in the National Semifinals, led by Bird, Ralph, Cash, Jones, and sophomore star Diana Taurasi. In 2003, Taurasi and UConn unexpectedly ended Tennessee’s season with a 73–68 win in the title game despite losing 4 out of 5 starters from the prior year, and in 2004 Taurasi again tormented the Lady Vols in a 70–61 championship game victory. These matchups hardened the rivalry into something more than competition—it was a cultural event, symbolizing the growing national stage of women’s basketball.

Star players became synonymous with the rivalry itself. Chamique Holdsclaw’s battles against Shea Ralph and Svetlana Abrosimova, Tamika Catchings and Kara Lawson squaring off with Taurasi and Bird, and the repeated championship showdowns all elevated the sport to new visibility. ESPN regularly broadcast the annual January Tennessee–UConn matchup in primetime, and the game became known simply as “The Game” in women’s basketball circles. By the mid-2000s, the rivalry had propelled women’s basketball into mainstream attention, with Tennessee embodying tradition and longevity while UConn represented the new order.

Though Tennessee often came up short in these clashes, the rivalry kept the Lady Vols on the sport’s biggest stage and sharpened them for deep March runs. Summitt herself viewed the annual series as essential preparation for the postseason, even when losses piled up. By the time the rivalry paused in 2007, UConn held a narrow edge in the all-time series, but the rivalry’s true legacy was the way it transformed women’s basketball from a niche sport into one that consistently drew national attention.

=== The Parker era and back-to-back titles (2005–2008) ===
The arrival of Candace Parker in Knoxville in 2004 was one of the most anticipated moments in women’s basketball history. A consensus No. 1 recruit and McDonald’s All-American from Naperville, Illinois, Parker was the first woman ever to win the McDonald’s All-American dunk contest, beating several male competitors. After redshirting her first year due to knee injuries, she debuted in the 2005–06 season and immediately altered the trajectory of the program. The Lady Vols went 31–5 in Parkers first season and were awarded a #2 seed in the NCAA tournament. In her freshman campaign, Parker averaged 17.3 points and 8.3 rebounds and became the first woman to dunk in an NCAA tournament game, throwing down two dunks in Tennessee’s first-round win over Army. The Lady Vols advanced to the Elite Eight that season, where they lost to North Carolina, 75–63.

In 2006–07, Parker’s stardom reached its peak. She led Tennessee in scoring (19.6 ppg) and rebounding (9.8 rpg) and was joined by veterans Alexis Hornbuckle, Shannon Bobbitt, and Nicky Anosike. The Lady Vols entered the NCAA tournament as a No. 1 seed and stormed through the field, defeating UNC 56–50 in a tense semifinal before dispatching Rutgers 59–46 in the championship game. Parker was named the tournament’s Most Outstanding Player, and Tennessee captured its seventh national championship, its first in nearly a decade.

The 2007–08 season brought even more drama. Tennessee opened the season ranked No. 1 and went 36–2 overall. Parker won her second consecutive Naismith and Wooden Awards as National Player of the Year, averaging 20.6 points and 8.8 rebounds per game. The supporting cast again included Hornbuckle and Anosike, whose defensive intensity gave Tennessee balance. In the NCAA tournament, Parker dislocated her shoulder during the regional final against Texas A&M but continued to play. Despite the injury, she scored 17 points in a narrow 47–46 semifinal win over LSU and added 17 more in the championship game, a 64–48 victory over Stanford. Anosike’s 13 rebounds and Hornbuckle’s defense on Stanford’s Candice Wiggins secured the win, and Parker was again named MOP.

With the back-to-back titles in 2007 and 2008, Parker left Tennessee as a two-time National Player of the Year and one of the most decorated players in program history. The Lady Vols had captured their seventh and eighth championships, and Summitt had surpassed John Wooden's mark for NCAA basketball titles. Parker averaged 19.4 points, 8.8 rebounds, and 2.6 assists over her three season career at Tennessee and would go on to be drafted first overall in the 2008 WNBA Draft by the Los Angeles Sparks.

=== Later Summitt years and retirement (2009–2012) ===
After Parker’s departure in 2008, Tennessee remained a tournament regular but was no longer an automatic Final Four participant. In 2008–09, the Lady Vols suffered their most shocking setback, a 71–55 first-round NCAA tournament loss to #12 seeded Ball State as a #5 seed—the program’s earliest exit ever. In 2009–10, they rebounded to win the SEC Tournament and advance to the Sweet Sixteen, and in 2011 and 2012 they reached consecutive Elite Eights with players like Angie Bjorklund, Shekinna Stricklen, and Glory Johnson.

In August 2011, Summitt announced she had been diagnosed with early-onset Alzheimer’s disease. She coached the 2011–12 season with the support of her assistants and players, leading Tennessee to a 27–9 record and another Elite Eight appearance before stepping down in April 2012. Summitt retired with 1,098 career wins, eight national championships, and 18 Final Four appearances, leaving behind one of the greatest legacies in the history of women's sports.

=== The Holly Warlick era (2012–2019) ===
Holly Warlick, a former Lady Vol All-American and Summitt’s longtime assistant, assumed the head coaching role in 2012. In her debut season Tennessee went 27–8 and reached the Elite Eight. In 2015 the Lady Vols made another Elite Eight appearance as a #2 seed, this time led by Ariel Massengale and Bashaara Graves, but fell to Maryland, 58–48. Despite consistently strong recruiting classes and regular NCAA appearances, Warlick’s teams struggled to advance past the second weekend and never made a Final Four.

By the mid–2010s, SEC rivals South Carolina, under Dawn Staley, and Mississippi State had supplanted Tennessee as the league’s dominant programs. Diamond DeShields, Mercedes Russell, and Jordan Reynolds gave the Lady Vols star power, but inconsistency plagued the program. After back-to-back seasons ending before the Sweet Sixteen, Warlick was dismissed in 2019 with a 172–67 record.

=== The Kellie Harper era (2019–2024) ===
When Kellie Jolly Harper, a three-time national champion point guard under Summitt, was hired in April 2019, she faced the challenge of restoring Tennessee to national prominence in a vastly changed landscape. Her tenure was defined by both moments of resurgence and frustrations in March, with each season providing its own storyline.

2019–20: Harper’s debut season showed flashes of promise but was disrupted by the COVID-19 pandemic. Tennessee finished 21–10 overall and 10–6 in SEC play, highlighted by wins over ranked foes Missouri State and LSU. The Lady Vols entered the SEC tournament as the No. 6 seed and reached the quarterfinals, losing to Kentucky 86–65. They were projected as an at-large team for the NCAA tournament, but the event was canceled due to the pandemic, leaving Harper’s first year incomplete.

2020–21: The second season marked a step forward. Tennessee went 17–8 overall, 9–4 in the SEC, earning a No. 3 seed in the SEC tournament. They reached the semifinals before falling to eventual conference champion South Carolina, 67–52. In the NCAA tournament, the Lady Vols earned a No. 3 seed in the Riverwalk Region and advanced to the second round before being upset by #6 seed Michigan, 70–55. Rennia Davis led the team in scoring, while Rae Burrell emerged as a breakout star.

2021–22: Harper’s third year produced Tennessee’s strongest start in over a decade. The Lady Vols began 18–1, rising to No. 4 in the AP Poll in January 2022. Key victories included an 84–58 blowout of Texas and a narrow 63–55 win over Kentucky. Injuries, however, derailed momentum; Davis graduated, and Burrell missed extended time. Tennessee finished the season 25–9 overall and 11–5 in the SEC, placing third in the league. In the SEC tournament, they fell to #7 seed Kentucky in the semifinals, 83–74. The Lady Vols entered the NCAA tournament as a No. 4 seed and advanced to the Sweet Sixteen after defeating Buffalo and Belmont. Their run ended against Louisville in the regional semifinal, 76–64. Tamari Key set a program single-season record for blocks, and Jordan Horston emerged as an all-SEC guard.

2022–23: The 2022–23 season reflected Tennessee’s continued presence in the SEC’s upper echelon but highlighted the difficulty of breaking through nationally. The Lady Vols finished 25–12 overall and 13–3 in SEC play, placing third in the league. In the SEC tournament they reached the final for the first time since 2015, losing to No. 1 seed South Carolina, 74–58. In the NCAA tournament, Tennessee was seeded No. 4 in the Seattle 3 Region, defeating Saint Louis and Toledo to reach another Sweet Sixteen. They fell to top-seeded Virginia Tech 73–64 in the regional semifinal, marking their third consecutive Sweet Sixteen appearance under Harper. Jordan Horston led the team in scoring and rebounding, while Rickea Jackson, a transfer from Mississippi State, became the team’s leading scorer in SEC play.

2023–24: Harper’s final season in Knoxville saw the Lady Vols take a step backward. Tennessee finished 20–13 overall and 10–6 in SEC play, securing a No. 5 seed in the SEC tournament. After a narrow 74–73 loss to undefeated South Carolina in the semifinals, Tennessee entered the NCAA tournament as a No. 6 seed. They defeated Green Bay 92–63 in the opening round before falling to No. 3 seed NC State 79–72 in the second round. The early exit, combined with inconsistent results during the regular season, led the administration to dismiss Harper in March 2024. She ended her tenure with a record of 108–52 and four straight NCAA tournament appearances, including three Sweet Sixteens.

Though the Lady Vols have not returned to the Final Four since 2008, the Harper years demonstrated the program’s ability to remain competitive nationally, while also underscoring the heightened parity in women’s basketball. With traditional rivals like South Carolina and LSU surging, Tennessee faces the challenge of reclaiming its place among the elite.

== Head coaches ==
Prior to 1971, records are incomplete.

- Katherine Williams, Captain, 1903 (0–2)
- Jenny Morrill, Captain, 1904, (0–2)
- Leo Thedore Bellmonts, 1905 (0–4)
- Essie Polk, captain, 1906 (0–3)
- Thomas Snoddy Myers, 1907 (1–1)
- Willard C. Burnley, 1908 (1–2)
- Andrew Weisenburg, 1909 (1–1–1)
- Howard Sandburg, 1910 (0–2)
- Mary Douglas Ayres, 1920 (2–3)
- Mabel Miller, 1922–1923 (4–2)
- Fay Morgan, 1924 (4–3)
- Ann Huddle, 1925–1926 (12–4–1)
- Nancy Lay, 1960–1968 (No results available)
- Joan Cronan, 1969–1970 (8–10)
- Margaret Hutson, 1971–1974 (60–18) — 2 TCWSF Eastern District Championships
- Pat Summitt, 1974–2012 (1098–208) — 8 NCAA Championships, 16 SEC Regular Season Championships, 16 SEC tournament championships
- Holly Warlick, 2012–2019 (172–67) – 2 SEC Regular Season Championships, 1 SEC tournament championship
- Kellie Harper, 2019–2024 (108–52)
- Kim Caldwell, 2024– (40–22)

== Retired jerseys ==
Retired Basketball Jerseys
Holly; Warlick; 22	Bridgette; Gordon; 30	Daedra; Charles; 32	Chamique; Holdsclaw; 23	Tamika; Catchings; 24	Candace; Parker; 3

== Player awards ==
=== National awards ===
- USBWA National Freshman of the Year

Shekinna Stricklen – 2009

- NCAA basketball tournament Most Outstanding Player

Tonya Edwards – 1987
Bridgette Gordon – 1989
Michelle M. Marciniak – 1996
Chamique Holdsclaw – 1997, 1998
Candace Parker – 2007, 2008

- Naismith College Player of the Year

Chamique Holdsclaw – 1998, 1999
Tamika Catchings – 2000
Candace Parker – 2008

- Wade Trophy

Daedra Charles – 1991
Candace Parker – 2007

- John R. Wooden Award

Candace Parker – 2007, 2008

- Associated Press Women's College Basketball Player of the Year

Chamique Holdsclaw – 1998, 1999
Tamika Catchings – 2000
Candace Parker – 2007, 2008

- Frances Pomeroy Naismith Award

Kara Lawson – 2003

=== SEC Awards ===
- Player of the Year Award

Bridgette Gordon – 1989
Dena Head – 1992
Nikki McCray – 1994, 1995
Chamique Holdsclaw – 1998, 1999
Candace Parker – 2007
Shekinna Stricklen – 2011
Meighan Simmons – 2013

== Prominent players ==
Following the Lady Vols' 7th championship during the 2006–2007 season, Sports Illustrated compiled a list of the 10 greatest Lady Vols basketball players of all time. In the order they were listed, they are:

=== First team ===
- Chamique Holdsclaw, Forward, 1995–1999 (20.4 ppg, 8.8 rpg, 51.0 FG%) — Led the Lady Vols to three national titles, while being named the national player of the year twice as well as the Naismith Player of the Century. Holds Lady Vols records for points and rebounds, and is in the top ten for assists, steals, and blocks.
- Dena Head, Guard, 1988–1992 (11.0 ppg, 4.7 rpg, 3.4 apg) — Helped Tennessee to two championships and was named an All-American in 1992. Ranks fourth all-time in assists with 457.
- Kara Lawson, Guard, 1999–2003 (13.6 ppg, 4.3 rpg, 41.4 3FT%) — Second all-time at Tennessee in three-pointers (256), fourth in scoring (1,950), and fifth in assists (456). Led Tennessee to four Final Fours and was an All-American in 2003.
- Candace Parker, Center, 2004–2008 (18.4 ppg, 9.0 rpg, 2.6 bpg) — 2007 Wade Trophy winner and fastest player to 1,000 points. Three-time All-American and Player of the Year 2006, 2007. Back to back National Championships.
- Tamika Catchings, Forward, 1997–2001 (16.6 ppg, 7.9 rpg, 50.5 FP%) — Only player besides Holdsclaw with more than 2,000 points and 1,000 rebounds. Four-time All-American and Player of the Year in 2000. Holds Lady Vols record for most points as a freshman with 711.

=== Second team ===
- Daedra Charles, Center, 1988–1991 (14.2 ppg, 8.2 rpg) — Won national title and Wade Trophy in 1991. 2-time All-American.
- Holly Warlick, Guard, 1976–1980 (6.4 ppg, 4.8 apg) — 3-time All-American. Second all-time in assists.
- Nikki McCray, Forward, 1991–1995 (12.4 ppg, 5.3 rpg) — 2-time All-American who led Tennessee to 4 SEC titles and 122 wins.
- Semeka Randall, Guard, 1997–2001 (13.7 ppg, 5.1 rpg) — Fifth in points with 1,915 as well as 286 steals.
- Bridgette Gordon, Forward, 1985–1989 (18.0 ppg, 6.7 rpg) — Two-time Kodak All-American; Led Tennessee to two titles. 2nd all-time at Tennessee in scoring with 2,460 points.

== Season–by–season results ==
Record table
Season	Team	Overall	Conference	Standing	Postseason
Tennessee Lady Volunteers (AIAW) (1974–1979)
Pat Head (1974–1980)
1974–75	Tennessee	16–8			
1975–76	Tennessee	16–11			
1976–77	Tennessee	28–5			AIAW Final Four
1977–78	Tennessee	27–4			AIAW First Round
1978–79	Tennessee	30–9			AIAW Final Four
Tennessee Lady Volunteers (SEC) (1979–2012)
1979–80	Tennessee	33–5			AIAW Runner-up
Pat Summitt (née Head) (1980–2012)
1980–81	Tennessee	25–6			AIAW Runner-up
1981–82	Tennessee	22–10			NCAA Final Four
1982–83	Tennessee	25–8	7–1	1st (East)	NCAA Elite Eight
1983–84	Tennessee	23–10	7–1	T–1st (East)	NCAA Runner-up
1984–85	Tennessee	22–10	4–4	T–2nd (East)	NCAA Sweet Sixteen
1985–86	Tennessee	24–10	5–4	5th	NCAA Final Four
1986–87	Tennessee	28–6	6–3	T–4th	NCAA Champions
1987–88	Tennessee	31–3	8–1	2nd	NCAA Final Four
1988–89†	Tennessee	35–2	8–1	2nd	NCAA Champions
1989–90	Tennessee	27–6	8–1	1st	NCAA Elite Eight
1990–91	Tennessee	30–5	6–3	3rd	NCAA Champions
1991–92	Tennessee	28–3	10–1	2nd	NCAA Sweet Sixteen
1992–93	Tennessee	29–3	11–0	1st	NCAA Elite Eight
1993–94	Tennessee	31–2	11–0	1st	NCAA Sweet Sixteen
1994–95	Tennessee	34–3	11–0	1st	NCAA Runner-up
1995–96†	Tennessee	32–4	9–2	2nd	NCAA Champions
1996–97	Tennessee	29–10	8–4	5th	NCAA Champions
1997–98‡	Tennessee	39–0	14–0	1st	NCAA Champions
1998–99	Tennessee	31–3	13–1	1st	NCAA Elite Eight
1999–00	Tennessee	33–4	13–1	T–1st	NCAA Runner-up
2000–01	Tennessee	31–3	14–0	1st	NCAA Sweet Sixteen
2001–02	Tennessee	29–5	13–1	1st	NCAA Final Four
2002–03	Tennessee	33–5	14–0	1st	NCAA Runner-up
2003–04	Tennessee	31–4	14–0	1st	NCAA Runner-up
2004–05	Tennessee	30–5	13–1	2nd	NCAA Final Four
2005–06	Tennessee	31–5	11–3	2nd	NCAA Elite Eight
2006–07#	Tennessee	34–3	14–0	1st	NCAA Champions
2007–08†	Tennessee	36–2	13–1	2nd	NCAA Champions
2008–09	Tennessee	22–11	9–5	5th	NCAA First Round
2009–10	Tennessee	32–3	15–1	1st	NCAA Sweet Sixteen
2010–11	Tennessee	34–3	16–0	1st	NCAA Elite Eight
2011–12	Tennessee	27–9	12–4	2nd	NCAA Elite Eight
Holly Warlick (2012–2019)
2012–13	Tennessee	27–8	14–2	1st	NCAA Elite Eight
2013–14	Tennessee	29–6	13–3	T-2nd	NCAA Sweet Sixteen
2014–15	Tennessee	30–6	15–1	T-1st	NCAA Elite Eight
2015–16	Tennessee	22–14	8–8	T-7th	NCAA Elite Eight
2016–17	Tennessee	20–12	10–6	5th	NCAA Second Round
2017–18	Tennessee	25–8	11–5	T-4th	NCAA Second Round
2018–19	Tennessee	19–13	7–9	T-8th	NCAA First Round
Kellie Harper (2019–2024)
2019–20	Tennessee	21–10	10–6	T–3rd	No postseason - COVID-19
2020–21	Tennessee	17–8	9–4	3rd	NCAA Second Round
2021–22	Tennessee	25–9	11–5	3rd	NCAA Sweet Sixteen
2022–23	Tennessee	23–11	13–3	3rd	NCAA Sweet Sixteen
2023–24	Tennessee	20–13	10–6	T–4th	NCAA Second Round
Kim Caldwell (2024–present)
2024–25	Tennessee	24–10	8–8	T–8th	NCAA Sweet Sixteen
2025–26	Tennessee	16–14	8–8	T–6th	NCAA First Round
Total:		1391–358 (.795)			
National champion Postseason invitational champion Conference regular season champion Conference regular season and conference tournament champion Division regular season champion Division regular season and conference tournament champion Conference tournament champion

== Postseason results ==
=== NCAA Division I ===
The Lady Volunteers have appeared in the NCAA Division I women's basketball tournament 44 times, which has included every played tournament from 1982 to 2026. They have a combined record of 132–35.

Year	Seed	Round	Opponent	Result
1982	#2	First round Sweet Sixteen; Elite Eight; Final Four	#7 Jackson State #3 Memphis #1 USC #1 Louisiana Tech	W 72–56; W 78–63; W 91–90 (OT); L 46–69
1983	#1	First round Sweet Sixteen; Elite Eight	#8 South Carolina State #4 Ole Miss #2 Georgia	W 86–51; W 90–83 (3OT); L 63–67
1984	#3	First round Sweet Sixteen; Elite Eight; Final Four; Title Game	#6 Middle Tennessee #2 Alabama #1 Georgia #3 Cheyney State #1 USC	W 70–53; W 65–58; W 73–61; W 80–71; L 61–72
1985	#3	First round Sweet Sixteen	#6 Virginia #2 Ole Miss	W 65–55; L 60–63
1986	#4	Second round Sweet Sixteen; Elite Eight; Final Four	#5 Iowa #1 Georgia #2 LSU #1 USC	W 73–68; W 85–82; W 67–65; L 59–83
1987	#2	Second round Sweet Sixteen; Elite Eight; Final Four; Title Game	#7 Tennessee Tech #3 Virginia #1 Auburn #1 Long Beach State #1 Louisiana Tech	W 95–59; W 66–58; W 77–61; W 74–64; W 67–44
1988	#1	Second round Sweet Sixteen; Elite Eight; Final Four	#9 Wake Forest #4 James Madison #2 Virginia #2 Louisiana Tech	W 94–66; W 72–52; W 84–76; L 59–68
1989	#1	Second round Sweet Sixteen; Elite Eight; Final Four; Title Game	#9 La Salle #4 Virginia #2 Long Beach State #1 Maryland #1 Auburn	W 91–61; W 80–47; W 94–80; W 77–65; W 76–60
1990	#1	Second round Sweet Sixteen; Elite Eight	#8 Old Dominion #5 Clemson #2 Virginia	W 87–68; W 80–62; L 75–79 (OT)
1991	#1	Second round Sweet Sixteen; Elite Eight; Final Four; Title Game	#8 Missouri State #4 Western Kentucky #3 Auburn #2 Stanford #1 Virginia	W 55–47; W 68–61; W 69–65; W 68–60; W 70–67 (OT)
1992	#1	Second round Sweet Sixteen	#8 Rutgers #4 Western Kentucky	W 97–56; L 70–75
1993	#1	Second round Sweet Sixteen; Elite Eight	#8 Northwestern #4 North Carolina #2 Iowa	W 89–66; W 74–54; L 56–72
1994	#1	First round Second round Sweet Sixteen	#16 North Carolina A&T #9 Clemson #4 Louisiana Tech	W 111–37; W 78–66; L 68–71
1995	#1	First round Second round Sweet Sixteen; Elite Eight; Final Four; Title Game	#16 Florida A&M #9 Florida International #4 Western Kentucky #2 Texas Tech #3 Georgia #1 Connecticut	W 96–59; W 70–44; W 87–65; W 80–59; W 73–51; L 64–70
1996	#1	First round Second round Sweet Sixteen; Elite Eight; Final Four; Title Game	#16 Radford #9 Ohio State #4 Kansas #3 Virginia #1 Connecticut #2 Georgia	W 97–56; W 97–65; W 92–71; W 52–46; W 88–83 (OT); W 83–65
1997	#3	First round Second round Sweet Sixteen; Elite Eight; Final Four; Title Game	#14 Grambling State #6 Oregon #2 Colorado #1 Connecticut #6 Notre Dame #1 Old Dominion	W 91–54; W 76–59; W 75–67; W 91–81; W 80–66; W 68–59
1998	#1	First round Second round Sweet Sixteen; Elite Eight; Final Four; Title Game	#16 Liberty #8 Western Kentucky #5 Rutgers #2 North Carolina #9 Arkansas #3 Louisiana Tech	W 102–58; W 82–62; W 92–60; W 76–70; W 86–58; W 93–75
1999	#1	First round Second round Sweet Sixteen; Elite Eight	#16 Appalachian State #8 Boston College #4 Virginia Tech #3 Duke	W 113–54; W 89–62; W 68–52; L 63–69
2000	#1	First round Second round Sweet Sixteen; Elite Eight; Final Four; Title Game	#16 Furman #8 Arizona #4 Virginia #3 Texas Tech #2 Rutgers #1 Connecticut	W 90–38; W 75–60; W 77–56; W 57–44; W 64–54; L 52–71
2001	#1	First round Second round Sweet Sixteen	#16 Austin Peay #9 St. Mary's #4 Xavier	W 90–38; W 92–75; L 65–80
2002	#2	First round Second round Sweet Sixteen; Elite Eight; Final Four	#15 Georgia State #7 Notre Dame #11 BYU #1 Vanderbilt #1 Connecticut	W 98–68; W 89–50; W 68–57; W 68–63; L 56–79
2003	#1	First round Second round Sweet Sixteen; Elite Eight; Final Four; Title Game	#16 Alabama State #8 Virginia #4 Penn State #2 Villanova #1 Duke #1 Connecticut	W 95–43; W 81–51; W 86–58; W 73–49; W 66–56; L 68–73
2004	#1	First round Second round Sweet Sixteen; Elite Eight; Final Four; Title Game	#16 Colgate #9 DePaul #4 Baylor #6 Stanford #4 LSU #2 Connecticut	W 77–54; W 79–59; W 71–69; W 62–60; W 52–50; L 61–70
2005	#1	First round Second round Sweet Sixteen; Elite Eight; Final Four	#16 Western Carolina #9 Purdue #4 Texas Tech #3 Rutgers #1 Michigan State	W 94–43; W 75–54; W 75–59; W 59–49; L 64–68
2006	#2	First round Second round Sweet Sixteen; Elite Eight	#15 Army #7 George Washington #3 Rutgers #1 North Carolina	W 102–54; W 66–53; W 76–69; L 63–75
2007	#1	First round Second round Sweet Sixteen; Elite Eight; Final Four; Title Game	#16 Drake #8 Pittsburgh #13 Marist #7 Ole Miss #1 North Carolina #4 Rutgers	W 76–37; W 68–54; W 65–46; W 98–62; W 56–50; W 59–46
2008	#1	First round Second round Sweet Sixteen; Elite Eight; Final Four; Title Game	#16 Oral Roberts #9 Purdue #5 Notre Dame #2 Texas A&M #2 LSU #2 Stanford	W 94–55; W 78–52; W 74–64; W 53–45; W 47–46; W 64–48
2009	#5	First round	#12 Ball State	L 55–71
2010	#1	First round Second round Sweet Sixteen	#16 Austin Peay #8 Dayton #4 Baylor	W 75–42; W 92–64; L 62–77
2011	#1	First round Second round Sweet Sixteen; Elite Eight	#16 Stetson #8 Marquette #4 Ohio State #2 Notre Dame	W 99–34; W 79–70; W 85–75; L 59–73
2012	#2	First round Second round Sweet Sixteen; Elite Eight	#15 Tennessee-Martin #7 DePaul #11 Kansas #1 Baylor	W 72–49; W 63–48; W 84–73; L 58–77
2013	#2	First round Second round Sweet Sixteen; Elite Eight	#15 Oral Roberts #10 Creighton #6 Oklahoma #5 Louisville	W 83–62; W 68–52; W 74–59; L 78–86
2014	#1	First round Second round Sweet Sixteen	#16 Northwestern State #8 St. John's #4 Maryland	W 70–46; W 67–51; L 62–73
2015	#2	First round Second round Sweet Sixteen; Elite Eight	#15 Boise State #10 Pittsburgh #11 Gonzaga #1 Maryland	W 72–61; W 77–67; W 73–69 (OT); L 48–58
2016	#7	First round Second round Sweet Sixteen; Elite Eight	#10 Green Bay #2 Arizona State #3 Ohio State #4 Syracuse	W 59–53; W 75–64; W 78–62; L 67–89
2017	#5	First round Second round	#12 Dayton #4 Louisville	W 66–57; L 64–75
2018	#3	First round Second round	#14 Liberty #6 Oregon State	W 100–60; L 59–66
2019	#11	First round	#6 UCLA	L 77–89
2021	#3	First round Second round	#14 Middle Tennessee #6 Michigan	W 87–62; L 55–70
2022	#4	First round Second round Sweet Sixteen	#13 Buffalo #12 Belmont #1 Louisville	W 80–67; W 70–67; L 64–76
2023	#4	First round Second round Sweet Sixteen	#13 Saint Louis #12 Toledo #1 Virginia Tech	W 95–50; W 94-47; L 64–73
2024	#6	First Round; Second Round	#11 Green Bay #3 NC State	W 92–63; L 72–79
2025	#5	First Round; Second Round; Sweet Sixteen	#12 South Florida #4 Ohio State #1 Texas	W 101–66; W 82–67; L 59–67
2026	#10	First round	#7 NC State	L 61–76

The following lists where the Lady Vols have been seeded in the NCAA tournament.

Years →	'82	'83	'84	'85	'86	'87	'88	'89	'90	'91	'92	'93	'94	'95	'96	'97	'98	'99	'00	'01	'02	'03	'04	'05	'06	'07	'08	'09	'10	'11	'12	'13	'14	'15	'16	'17	'18	'19	'21	'22	'23	'24	'25	'26
Seeds →	2	1	3	3	4	2	1	1	1	1	1	1	1	1	1	3	1	1	1	1	2	1	1	1	2	1	1	5	1	1	2	2	1	2	7	5	3	11	3	4	4	6	5	10

=== National Championships ===
Year	Coach	Opponent	Score	Record
1987	Pat Summitt	Louisiana Tech Lady Techsters	67–44	28–6
1989	Pat Summitt	Auburn Tigers	76–60	35–2
1991	Pat Summitt	Virginia Cavaliers	70–67 OT	30–5
1996	Pat Summitt	Georgia Bulldogs	83–65	32–4
1997	Pat Summitt	Old Dominion Monarchs	68–59	29–10
1998	Pat Summitt	Louisiana Tech Lady Techsters	93–75	39–0
2007	Pat Summitt	Rutgers Scarlet Knights	59–46	34–3
2008	Pat Summitt	Stanford Cardinal	64–48	36–2
National Championships			8	

=== AIAW Division I ===
The Lady Volunteers made five appearances in the AIAW women's basketball tournament, with a combined record of 12–6.

Year	Round	Opponent	Result
1977	First round Quarterfinals; Semifinals; Third-place game	Michigan State; Kansas State; Delta State; Immaculata	W, 76–62; W, 81–69; L, 58–62; W, 91–71
1978	First round Consolation round	Maryland; Valdosta State	L, 69–75; L, 80–83
1979	First round Quarterfinals; Semifinals; Third-place game	Rutgers; Fordham; Louisiana Tech; UCLA	W, 79–68; W, 76–54; L, 84–102; W, 104–86
1980	First round Quarterfinals; Semifinals; National Championship	Kansas State; Maryland; South Carolina; Old Dominion	W, 84–64; W, 93–76; W, 75–72; L, 53–68
1981	First round Quarterfinals; Semifinals; National Championship	Illinois State; Maryland; Old Dominion; Louisiana Tech	W, 78–63; W, 79–67; W, 68–65; L, 59–79

== See also ==
- 1987 NCAA Division I women's basketball tournament
- 1989 NCAA Division I women's basketball tournament
- 1991 NCAA Division I women's basketball tournament
- 1996 NCAA Division I women's basketball tournament
- 1997 NCAA Division I women's basketball tournament
- 1998 NCAA Division I women's basketball tournament
- 2007 NCAA Division I women's basketball tournament
- 2008 NCAA Division I women's basketball tournament
- List of teams with the most victories in NCAA Division I women's college basketball
- Connecticut–Tennessee rivalry
