= 1987 Southwest Conference women's basketball tournament =

- Classification: Division I
- Teams: 6
- Site: Moody Coliseum; Dallas, Texas
- Champions: Texas (5th title)
- Winning coach: Jody Conradt (5th title)
- MVP: Beverly Williams (Texas)

1986–87 Southwest Conference women's basketball standings
	Conf.				Overall
Team	W		L	PCT	W		L	PCT
No. 1 Texas †	16	–	0	1.000	31	–	2	.939
Arkansas	12	–	4	.750	20	–	12	.625
Houston	10	–	6	.625	19	–	10	.655
Texas Tech	10	–	6	.625	18	–	11	.621
Rice	7	–	9	.438	15	–	13	.536
Baylor	5	–	11	.313	8	–	20	.286
Texas A&M	5	–	11	.313	9	–	17	.346
SMU	4	–	12	.250	8	–	19	.296
TCU	3	–	13	.188	8	–	19	.296
† 1987 SWC tournament winner Rankings from AP Poll

The 1987 Southwest Conference women's basketball tournament was held March 4–7, 1987, at Moody Coliseum in Dallas, Texas.

Number 1 seed Texas defeated 2 seed Arkansas 72–70 to win their fifth championship and receive the conference's automatic bid to the 1987 NCAA tournament.

== Format and seeding ==
The tournament consisted of a 6 team single-elimination tournament. The top two seeds had a bye to the Semifinals.

Place	Seed	Team	Conference			Overall		
Place	Seed	Team	W	L	%	W	L	%
1	1	Texas	16	0	1.000	31	2	.939
2	2	Arkansas	12	4	.750	20	12	.625
3	3	Houston	10	6	.625	19	10	.655
3	4	Texas Tech	10	6	.625	18	11	.621
5	5	Rice	7	9	.438	15	13	.536
6	6	Baylor	5	11	.313	8	20	.286
6	-	Texas A&M	5	11	.313	9	17	.346
8	-	SMU	4	12	.250	8	19	.296
9	-	TCU	3	13	.188	8	19	.296

== Tournament ==
Quarterfinal; Wednesday, March 4
4	Texas Tech	69
5	Rice	59
3	Houston	70
6	Baylor	52

Semifinals; Thursday, March 5
1	Texas	73
4	Texas Tech	49
2	Arkansas	96
3	Houston	82

Finals; Saturday, March 7
1	Texas	72
2	Arkansas	70
