= 1986–87 Long Beach State 49ers women's basketball team =

American college basketball season

1986–87 Long Beach State Beach women's basketball

PCAA champions

NCAA tournament, Final Four
- Conference: Pacific Coast Athletic Association

Ranking
- Coaches: No. 4
- AP: No. 4
- Record: 33–3 (17–1 PCAA)
- Head coach: Joan Bonvicini (8th season)
- Home arena: Gold Mine

1986–87 Pacific Coast Athletic Association women's basketball standings
	Conf.				Overall
Team	W		L	PCT	W		L	PCT
No. 4 Long Beach State †	17	–	1	.944	33	–	3	.917
Hawaii	13	–	5	.722	21	–	7	.750
UNLV	13	–	5	.722	21	–	9	.700
Fresno State	12	–	6	.667	22	–	8	.733
UC Irvine	10	–	8	.556	14	–	15	.483
Cal State Fullerton	9	–	9	.500	12	–	16	.429
San Diego State	9	–	9	.500	13	–	16	.448
Pacific	5	–	13	.278	12	–	16	.429
UC Santa Barbara	1	–	17	.056	4	–	22	.154
San Jose State	1	–	17	.056	3	–	23	.115
† 1987 PCAA tournament winner Rankings from AP Poll

The 1986–87 Long Beach State 49ers women's basketball team represented California State University, Long Beach during the 1986–87 NCAA Division I women's basketball season. The Beach, led by eighth-year head coach Joan Bonvicini, played their home games at the Gold Mine in Long Beach, California as members of the Pacific Coast Athletic Association.

== Roster ==
1986–87 Long Beach State 49ers women's basketball team
Players
Coaches

Pos.	#	Name	Height	Year	Previous school	Hometown
G	11	Penny Toler	5 ft 8 in (1.73 m)	So	St. Anthony; San Diego State	Washington, D.C.
F/C	21	Shannon Smith	6 ft 3 in (1.91 m)	Fr
F/C	53	Cindy Brown	6 ft 2 in (1.88 m)	Sr	Grant	Portland, Oregon
F		Shameil Coleman	5 ft 11 in (1.8 m)	So
F		Cheryl Dowell	6 ft 1 in (1.85 m)	So
F		Bettina Turner	6 ft 0 in (1.83 m)	So

Head coach

- Joan Bonvicini

Assistant coach(es)

Legend

- (C) Team captain
- (S) Suspended
- (I) Ineligible
- (W) Walk-on
- Injured
- Current redshirt

Roster

== Schedule and results ==
Date time, TV	Rank^{#}	Opponent^{#}	Result	Record	Site (attendance) city, state
Regular season
Nov 28, 1986*	No. 7	vs. No. 1 Texas; USC Classic	L 86–100	0–1	L.A. Sports Arena; Los Angeles, California
Nov 29, 1986*	No. 7	vs. No. 12 Old Dominion; USC Classic	W 94–61	1–1	L.A. Sports Arena; Los Angeles, California
Dec 2, 1986*	No. 7	Arizona State	W 106–69	2–1	Gold Mine; Long Beach, California
Dec 5, 1986*	No. 7	at Oregon	W 82–69	3–1	McArthur Court; Eugene, Oregon
Dec 7, 1986*	No. 7	at Oregon State	W 73–62	4–1	Gill Coliseum; Corvallis, Oregon
Dec 12, 1986*	No. 7	Arkansas; LBSU Dial Soap Classic	W 76–58	5–1	Gold Mine; Long Beach, California
Dec 13, 1986*	No. 7	Texas A&M; LBSU Dial Soap Classic	W 97–71	6–1	Gold Mine; Long Beach, California
Dec 15, 1986*	No. 7	at UCLA	W 100–65	7–1	Pauley Pavilion; Los Angeles, California
Jan 3, 1987*	No. 7	Fairfield	W 78–53	8–1	Gold Mine; Long Beach, California
Jan 5, 1987	No. 7	at UNLV	W 117–84	9–1 (1–0)	Thomas & Mack Center; Paradise, Nevada
Jan 8, 1987	No. 7	at San Diego State	W 80–59	10–1 (2–0)	Peterson Gym; San Diego, California
Jan 10, 1987	No. 7	at UC Irvine	W 104–55	11–1 (3–0)	Crawford Hall; Irvine, California
Jan 12, 1987	No. 7	at Cal State Fullerton	W 91–61	12–1 (4–0)	Titan Gym; Fullerton, California
Jan 14, 1987*	No. 7	No. 6 Louisiana Tech	W 99–95 ^{OT}	13–1	Gold Mine (1,769); Long Beach, California
Jan 17, 1987	No. 7	Fresno State	W 114–70	14–1 (5–0)	Gold Mine; Long Beach, California
Jan 22, 1987	No. 5	San Jose State	W 120–53	15–1 (6–0)	Gold Mine; Long Beach, California
Jan 24, 1987	No. 5	Pacific	W 114–65	16–1 (7–0)	Gold Mine; Long Beach, California
Jan 26, 1987*	No. 5	USC	W 87–69	17–1	Gold Mine; Long Beach, California
Jan 29, 1987	No. 5	at UC Santa Barbara	W 105–25	18–1 (8–0)	UC Santa Barbara Events Center; Santa Barbara, California
Jan 31, 1987	No. 5	at Fresno State	W 79–78	19–1 (9–0)	Selland Arena; Fresno, California
Feb 5, 1987	No. 4	at Hawaii	W 67–51	20–1 (10–0)	Neal S. Blaisdell Center; Honolulu, Hawaii
Feb 7, 1987	No. 4	at Hawaii	L 66–67 ^{OT}	20–2 (10–1)	Neal S. Blaisdell Center; Honolulu, Hawaii
Feb 12, 1987	No. 6	at UC Santa Barbara	W 115–50	21–2 (11–1)	Gold Mine; Long Beach, California
Feb 14, 1987	No. 6	at Pacific	W 99–46	22–2 (12–1)	Alex G. Spanos Center; Stockton, California
Feb 16, 1987	No. 6	at San Jose State	W 149–69	23–2 (13–1)	Spartan Gym; San Jose, California
Feb 19, 1987	No. 5	UNLV	W 86–63	24–2 (14–1)	Gold Mine; Long Beach, California
Feb 21, 1987	No. 5	San Diego State	W 109–73	25–2 (15–1)	Gold Mine; Long Beach, California
Feb 26, 1987	No. 5	UC Irvine	W 87–54	26–2 (16–1)	Gold Mine; Long Beach, California
Feb 28, 1987	No. 5	Cal State Fullerton	W 107–63	27–2 (17–1)	Gold Mine; Long Beach, California
PCAA tournament
Mar 5, 1987*	(1) No. 4	Pacific; Quarterfinals	W 123–65	28–2	Gold Mine; Long Beach, California
Mar 6, 1987*	(1) No. 4	vs. San Diego State; Semifinals	W 108–74	29–2	The Forum; Inglewood, California
Mar 7, 1987*	(1) No. 4	vs. UNLV; Championship game	W 98–57	30–2	The Forum; Inglewood, California
NCAA tournament
Mar 14, 1987*	(1 W) No. 4	(8 W) Washington; Second round	W 72–57	31–2	Gold Mine; Long Beach, California
Mar 20, 1987*	(1 W) No. 4	vs. (4 W) Ole Miss; Regional Semifinal – Sweet Sixteen	W 94–55	32–2	Pauley Pavilion; Los Angeles, California
Mar 22, 1987*	(1 W) No. 4	vs. (2 W) No. 10 Ohio State; Regional Final – Elite Eight	W 102–82	33–2	Pauley Pavilion; Los Angeles, California
Mar 27, 1987*	(1 W) No. 4	vs. (2 ME) No. 7 Tennessee; National Semifinal – Final Four	L 64–74	33–3	Frank Erwin Center; Austin, Texas
*Non-conference game. ^{#}Rankings from AP Poll. (#) Tournament seedings in parentheses. All times are in Pacific.

== Rankings ==
Ranking movements Legend: ██ Increase in ranking ██ Decrease in ranking
	Week																
Poll	1	2	3	4	5	6	7	8	9	10	11	12	13	14	15	16	Final
AP	7	7	7	7	8	7	7	7	5	5	4	6	5	5	4	4	Not released
Coaches	10	8	8	8	8	7	7	7	5	5	4	6	6	5	4	4	4
