= 1986–87 Iowa Hawkeyes women's basketball team =

Intercollegiate basketball season

1986–87 Iowa Hawkeyes women's basketball

Big Ten Conference regular season co-champions

NCAA tournament, Elite Eight
- Conference: Big Ten Conference

Ranking
- Coaches: No. 7
- AP: No. 9
- Record: 26–5 (17–1 Big Ten)
- Head coach: C. Vivian Stringer (4th season)
- Home arena: Carver–Hawkeye Arena

1986–87 Big Ten women's basketball standings
	Conf.				Overall
Team	W		L	PCT	W		L	PCT
No. 9 Iowa	17	–	1	.944	26	–	5	.839
No. 10 Ohio State	17	–	1	.944	26	–	5	.839
Northwestern	12	–	6	.667	20	–	10	.667
Illinois	11	–	7	.611	19	–	10	.655
Purdue	10	–	8	.556	18	–	9	.667
Michigan State	8	–	10	.444	16	–	12	.571
Indiana	5	–	13	.278	10	–	17	.370
Minnesota	4	–	14	.222	9	–	19	.321
Wisconsin	4	–	14	.222	9	–	19	.321
Michigan	2	–	16	.111	9	–	18	.333
Rankings from AP Poll

The 1986–87 Iowa Hawkeyes women's basketball team represented the University of Iowa as members of the Big Ten Conference during the 1986–87 NCAA women's basketball season. The Hawkeyes, led by fourth-year head coach C. Vivian Stringer, played their home games in Iowa City, Iowa at Carver–Hawkeye Arena. They finished the season 26–5 overall, 17–1 in Big Ten play, sharing the regular season conference championship. The team was the first Iowa Hawkeyes women's basketball team to advance to the Elite Eight in the women's NCAA basketball tournament.

== Roster ==
1986–87 Iowa Hawkeyes women's basketball team
Players
Coaches

Pos.	#	Name	Height	Year	Previous school	Hometown
F	14	Lynn Kennedy	—	Sr		Irvington, NJ
G	23	Tricia Blair	—	Sr		McFarland, WI
F	24	Lisa Long	—	Sr		Newark, NJ
F	25	Franthea Price	5 ft 9 in (1.75 m)	Fr	River Rouge	River Rouge, MI
G	30	Michelle Edwards	5 ft 9 in (1.75 m)	Jr	Cathedral	Boston, MA
G	34	Jolette Law	5 ft 3 in (1.6 m)	Fr	Wilson	Florence, SC
C	44	Marva Fuller	6 ft 5 in (1.96 m)	Jr	Holly	Holly, MI

Head coach

- C. Vivian Stringer

Assistant coach(es)

- Jennifer Bednarek
- Marianna Freeman

Legend

- (C) Team captain
- (S) Suspended
- (I) Ineligible
- (W) Walk-on
- Injured
- Current redshirt

Roster

== Schedule and results ==
Date time, TV	Rank^{#}	Opponent^{#}	Result	Record	Site city, state
Regular season
Nov 29, 1986*	No. 8	Boston University; Amana-Hawkeye Classic	W 70–48	1–0	Carver-Hawkeye Arena; Iowa City, Iowa
Nov 30, 1986*	No. 8	No. 3 Tennessee; Amana-Hawkeye Classic	L 56–74	1–1	Carver-Hawkeye Arena; Iowa City, Iowa
Dec 2, 1986*	No. 11	at Nebraska	L 74–85	1–2	Bob Devaney Sports Center; Lincoln, Nebraska
Dec 3, 1986*	No. 11	at Drake	W 71–57	2–2	Veterans Memorial Auditorium; Des Moines, Iowa
Dec 4, 1986*	No. 11	Iowa State	W 70–51	3–2	Carver-Hawkeye Arena; Iowa City, Iowa
Dec 13, 1986*	No. 17	at Illinois State	W 71–56	4–2	Horton Fieldhouse; Normal, Illinois
Dec 21, 1986*	No. 17	Western Kentucky	W 67–47	5–2	Carver-Hawkeye Arena; Iowa City, Iowa
Dec 29, 1986*	No. 14	vs. No. 12 Penn State; North Carolina State Classic	L 74–78 ^{OT}	5–3	Reynolds Coliseum; Raleigh, North Carolina
Dec 30, 1986*	No. 14	vs. Indiana; North Carolina State Classic	W 63–56	6–3	Reynolds Coliseum; Raleigh, North Carolina
Jan 2, 1987	No. 14	at Wisconsin	W 83–44	7–3 (1–0)	Wisconsin Field House; Madison, Wisconsin
Jan 4, 1987	No. 14	at Northwestern	W 72–61	8–3 (2–0)	Welsh-Ryan Arena; Evanston, Illinois
Jan 7, 1987*	No. 14	LSU	W 68–49	9–3	Carver-Hawkeye Arena; Iowa City, Iowa
Jan 9, 1987	No. 14	Minnesota	W 81–40	10–3 (3–0)	Carver-Hawkeye Arena; Iowa City, Iowa
Jan 16, 1987	No. 10	Illinois	W 80–53	11–3 (4–0)	Carver-Hawkeye Arena; Iowa City, Iowa
Jan 18, 1987	No. 10	Purdue	W 68–54	12–3 (5–0)	Carver-Hawkeye Arena; Iowa City, Iowa
Jan 23, 1987	No. 10	at Indiana	W 60–49	13–3 (6–0)	Assembly Hall; Bloomington, Indiana
Jan 25, 1987	No. 10	at No. 17 Ohio State	L 54–67	13–4 (6–1)	St. John Arena; Columbus, Ohio
Jan 30, 1987	No. 13	Michigan State	W 83–61	14–4 (7–1)	Carver-Hawkeye Arena; Iowa City, Iowa
Feb 1, 1987	No. 13	Michigan	W 75–54	15–4 (8–1)	Carver-Hawkeye Arena; Iowa City, Iowa
Feb 6, 1987	No. 12	at Minnesota	W 78–60	16–4 (9–1)	Williams Arena; Minneapolis, Minnesota
Feb 13, 1987	No. 11	at Purdue	W 86–68	17–4 (10–1)	Mackey Arena; West Lafayette, Indiana
Feb 15, 1987	No. 11	at Illinois	W 70–54	18–4 (11–1)	Assembly Hall; Champaign, Illinois
Feb 20, 1987	No. 11	No. 10 Ohio State	W 66–54	19–4 (12–1)	Carver-Hawkeye Arena; Iowa City, Iowa
Feb 22, 1987	No. 11	Indiana	W 71–50	20–4 (13–1)	Carver-Hawkeye Arena; Iowa City, Iowa
Feb 27, 1987	No. 10	at Michigan	W 78–54	21–4 (14–1)	Crisler Arena; Ann Arbor, Michigan
Mar 1, 1987	No. 10	at Michigan State	W 71–49	22–4 (15–1)	Jenison Fieldhouse; East Lansing, Michigan
Mar 4, 1987	No. 10	Northwestern	W 70–53	23–4 (16–1)	Carver-Hawkeye Arena; Iowa City, Iowa
Mar 7, 1987	No. 10	Wisconsin	W 78–56	24–4 (17–1)	Carver-Hawkeye Arena; Iowa City, Iowa
NCAA tournament
Mar 15, 1987*	(3 MW) No. 9	New Orleans; Second round	W 68–46	25–4	Carver-Hawkeye Arena; Iowa City, Iowa
Mar 20, 1987*	(3 MW) No. 9	vs. (2 MW) No. 11 Georgia; Midwest Regional Semifinal – Sweet Sixteen	W 62–60	26–4	Fant–Ewing Coliseum; Monroe, Louisiana
Mar 22, 1987*	(3 MW) No. 9	vs. (1 MW) No. 2 Louisiana Tech; Midwest Regional Final – Elite Eight	L 65–66	26–5	Fant–Ewing Coliseum; Monroe, Louisiana
*Non-conference game. ^{#}Rankings from AP Poll. (#) Tournament seedings in parentheses. MW=Midwest.
