= 1987 NAIA women's basketball tournament =

- Teams: 16
- Finals site: , Kansas City, Missouri
- Champions: SW Oklahoma State Bulldogs (4th title, 4th title game, 4th Fab Four)
- Runner-up: North Georgia Saints (1st title game, 1st Fab Four)
- Semifinalists: Wisconsin–Green Bay Phoenix (1st Fab Four); Arkansas Tech Golden Suns (1st Fab Four)
- Coach of the year: John Loftin (SW Oklahoma State)
- Charles Stevenson Hustle Award: Susie Klaubauf (Wisconsin–Green Bay)
- Chuck Taylor MVP: Brenda Hill (North Georgia)
- Top scorer: Brenda Hill (North Georgia) (115 points)

The 1987 NAIA women's basketball tournament was the seventh annual tournament held by the NAIA to determine the national champion of women's college basketball among its members in the United States and Canada.

SW Oklahoma State defeated North Georgia in the championship game, 60–58, to claim the Bulldogs' fourth NAIA national title.

The tournament was played in Kansas City, Missouri.

== Qualification ==
The tournament field remained fixed at sixteen teams, with seeds assigned to the top eight teams.

The tournament utilized a simple single-elimination format, with an additional third-place game for the two teams that lost in the semifinals.

== Bracket ==
Round of 16
1	Wayland Baptist	95
St. Joseph's (ME)	61
Auburn Montgomery	61
8	Wisconsin–Green Bay	87
5	Wingate	66
Fresno Pacific	52
IUPUI	70
4	North Georgia	86
3	Saginaw Valley	87
Bluefield State	70
Bemidji State	68
6	Arkansas Tech	69
7	Western Oregon State	80
St. Ambrose	90
Kearney State	69
2	SW Oklahoma State	74*

Quarterfinals
1	Wayland Baptist	73
8	Wisconsin–Green Bay	74
5	Wingate	51
4	North Georgia	82
3	Saginaw Valley	56
6	Arkansas Tech	58
St. Ambrose	63
2	SW Oklahoma State	78

Semifinals
8	Wisconsin–Green Bay	76
4	North Georgia	85
6	Arkansas Tech	58
2	SW Oklahoma State	70

National championship
4	North Georgia	58
2	SW Oklahoma State	60
National third place
8	Wisconsin–Green Bay	82
6	Arkansas Tech	56

== See also ==
- 1987 NCAA Division I women's basketball tournament
- 1987 NCAA Division II women's basketball tournament
- 1987 NCAA Division III women's basketball tournament
- 1987 NAIA men's basketball tournament
