= 1987 NAIA men's basketball tournament =

College basketball tournament

- Teams: 32
- Finals site: Kemper Arena; Kansas City, Missouri
- Champions: Washburn (1 title, 1 title game, 2 Fab Four)
- Runner-up: West Virginia State (1 title game, 1 Fab Four)
- Semifinalists: Central Washington (5 Final Four); Georgetown (KY) (3 Final Four)
- Charles Stevenson Hustle Award: Bobby Sumler (Washburn)
- Chuck Taylor MVP: Tom Meier (Washburn)

The 1987 NAIA men's basketball tournament was held in March at Kemper Arena in Kansas City, Missouri. The 50th annual NAIA basketball tournament featured 32 teams playing in a single-elimination format. Washburn won a close final (79-77) against West Virginia State.

== Awards and honors ==
- Leading scorers:
- Leading rebounder:
- Player of the Year: est. 1994.

== Bracket ==
First round	Second round
1	Oklahoma City	101
–	Northwood	66
1	Oklahoma City	64
16	Georgetown (KY)	67
16	Georgetown (KY)	57
–	Minnesota–Duluth	46
TOP TIER
9	Trevecca Nazarene	82
–	Wayland Baptist	68
9	Trevecca Nazarene	73'
8	St. Mary’s (TX)	68
8	St. Mary's (TX)	74
–	Rio Grande	54
–	Valley City State	63
5	Wisconsin–Eau Claire	61
–	Valley City State	84
–	Waynesburg	86
–	Waynesburg	108
12	Kearney State	104
TOP TIER
13	Oregon Tech	67
–	Northwestern (IA)	63
13	Oregon Tech	90
4	West Virginia State	92*
4	West Virginia State	98
–	Harding	86
3	Biola	66
–	Saint Joseph's (ME)	78
–	St. Joseph’s (ME)	66
14	Auburn Montgomery	76
14	Auburn Montgomery	85
–	Eureka	54
BOTTOM TIER
11	Southern Tech	56
–	Taylor	65
–	Taylor	44
6	Washburn	74
6	Washburn	87
–	Cabrini	64
7	St. Thomas Aquinas	83
–	William Carey	68
7	St. Thomas Aquinas	83
10	Central Washington	84
10	Central Washington	86
–	Atlantic Christian	83
BOTTOM TIER
15	Hawaii–Hilo	82
–	Missouri Southern	79
15	Hawaii-Hilo	65
2	College of Charleston	57
2	College of Charleston	67
–	Western State (CO)	51

Elite Eight
16	Georgetown (KY)	81
9	Trevecca Nazarene	66
–	Waynesburg	67
4	West Virginia State	73
6	Washburn	69
14	Auburn Montgomery	61
10	Central Washington	92
15	Hawaii-Hilo	75

NAIA national semifinals
16	Georgetown (KY)	67
4	West Virginia State	74
6	Washburn	65
10	Central Washington	63

NAIA national championship
4	West Virginia State	77
6	Washburn	79
NAIA third-place game
10	Central Washington	79
16	Georgetown (KY)	69

- * denotes overtime.

== See also ==
- 1987 NCAA Division I men's basketball tournament
- 1987 NCAA Division II men's basketball tournament
- 1987 NCAA Division III men's basketball tournament
- 1987 NAIA women's basketball tournament
