= 1987 NCAA Division III women's basketball tournament =

American women's basketball tournament

- Teams: 32
- Finals site: , Scranton, Pennsylvania
- Champions: Wisconsin–Stevens Point Pointers (1st title)
- Runner-up: Concordia Cobbers (1st title game)
- Third place: Scranton Royals (2nd Final Four)
- Fourth place: Kean Cougars (1st Final Four)
- Winning coach: Linda Wunder (1st title)

The 1987 NCAA Division III women's basketball tournament was the sixth annual tournament hosted by the NCAA to determine the national champion of Division III women's collegiate basketball in the United States.

Wisconsin–Stevens Point defeated Concordia Moorhead in the championship game, 81–74, to claim the Pointers' first Division III national title.

The championship rounds were held in Scranton, Pennsylvania.

== Bracket ==
=== First round ===
- St. John Fisher 69, NYU 59
- Stony Brook 77, Rochester (NY) 72
- Scranton 62, Marywood 57
- Elizabethtown 71, Spring Garden 56
- Wis.-Stevens Point 75, St. Norbert 58
- Alma 67, Wis.-Whitewater 48
- Rockford 69, St. Thomas (MN) 65
- William Penn 55, Augustana (IL) 53
- Southern Me. 79, Clark (MA) 70
- Emmanuel (MA) 62, Salem St. 58
- Kean 87, Allegheny 68
- Ohio Northern 68, Capital 64
- Rust 79, Buffalo St. 60
- Centre 79, UNC Greensboro 69
- Concordia-M’head 77, Stanislaus St. 64
- Pomona-Pitzer 74, Bishop 50

=== Regional finals ===
- St. John Fisher 63, Stony Brook 54
- Scranton 66, Elizabethtown 59
- Wis.-Stevens Point 67, Alma 55
- William Penn 67, Rockford 64
- Southern Me. 70, Emmanuel (MA) 53
- Kean 69, Ohio Northern 58
- Rust 76, Centre 50
- Concordia-M’head 68, Pomona-Pitzer 46

=== National finals ===
National quarterfinals
Scranton	50*
St. John Fisher	43
Wisconsin–Stevens Point	71
William Penn	66
Kean	69
Southern Maine	56
Concordia Moorhead	72
Rust	62

National semifinals
Scranton	59
Wisconsin–Stevens Point	74
Kean	69
Concordia Moorhead	74

National championship
Wisconsin–Stevens Point	81
Concordia Moorhead	74
National third-place game
Scranton	92*
Kean	90

== All-tournament team ==
- Jessica Beachy, Concordia Moorhead
- Una Espenkotter, Scranton
- Wendy Norris, Kean
- Donna Pivonka, Wisconsin–Stevens Point
- Karla Miller, Wisconsin–Stevens Point

== See also ==
- 1987 NCAA Division I women's basketball tournament
- 1987 NCAA Division II women's basketball tournament
- 1987 NCAA Division III men's basketball tournament
- 1987 NAIA women's basketball tournament
