= 1986–87 Tennessee Lady Volunteers basketball team =

Intercollegiate basketball season

1986–87 Tennessee Lady Volunteers basketball

NCAA tournament National champions
- Conference: Southeastern Conference

Ranking
- Coaches: No. 1
- AP: No. 7
- Record: 28–6 (6–3 SEC)
- Head coach: Pat Summitt (13th season)
- Assistant coaches: Mickie DeMoss; Heidi VanDerveer; Holly Warlick
- Home arena: Stokely Athletic Center

1986–87 SEC women's basketball standings
	Conf.				Overall
Team	W		L	PCT	W		L	PCT
No. 2 Auburn ^{†}	8	–	1	.889	31	–	2	.939
No. 6 Georgia	7	–	2	.778	27	–	5	.844
No. 8 Ole Miss	7	–	2	.778	25	–	5	.833
No. 7 Tennessee	6	–	3	.667	28	–	6	.824
LSU	6	–	3	.667	20	–	8	.714
Vanderbilt	4	–	5	.444	23	–	10	.697
Kentucky	3	–	6	.333	17	–	11	.607
Alabama	2	–	7	.222	19	–	10	.655
Mississippi State	2	–	7	.222	13	–	17	.433
Florida	0	–	9	.000	12	–	16	.429
† 1987 SEC tournament winner Rankings from AP poll

The 1986–87 Tennessee Lady Volunteers basketball team represented the University of Tennessee as a member of the Southeastern Conference during the 1986–87 women's college basketball season. Coached by Pat Summitt, the Lady Volunteers finished 28–6 and won the program's first NCAA championship. The Lady Vols started the season ranked No. 3 and played their home games at Stokely Athletic Center for the final season.

== Roster ==
1986–87 Tennessee Lady Volunteers women's basketball team
Players
Coaches

Pos.	#	Name	Height	Year	Previous school	Hometown
G	4	Dawn Marsh	5 ft 6 in (1.68 m)	Jr		Alcoa, Tennessee
C	11	Kathy Spinks	6 ft 2 in (1.88 m)	Jr		Forest Hills, Kentucky
C	12	Sheila Frost	6 ft 4 in (1.93 m)	So		Pulaski, Tennessee
F	14	Gay Townson	5 ft 9 in (1.75 m)	Jr		Loudon, Tennessee
G	23	Shelley Sexton	5 ft 7 in (1.7 m)	Sr		Lake City, Tennessee
F/C	24	Carla McGhee	6 ft 3 in (1.91 m)	Fr		Peoria, Illinois
F	30	Bridgette Gordon	6 ft 0 in (1.83 m)	So	DeLand	DeLand, Florida
F	32	Jennifer Tuggle	6 ft 2 in (1.88 m)	RS So		Etowah, Tennessee
G	33	Tonya Edwards	5 ft 10 in (1.78 m)	Fr	Flint Northwestern	Flint, Michigan
F	34	Lisa Webb	5 ft 9 in (1.75 m)	Jr		Milledgeville, Georgia
G/F	35	Melissa McCray	5 ft 10 in (1.78 m)	So		Johnson City, Tennessee
G	40	Sabrina Mott	5 ft 9 in (1.75 m)	Fr		Brentwood, Tennessee
C	44	Cheryl Littlejohn	6 ft 3 in (1.91 m)	Sr		Gastonia, North Carolina
F/C	55	Karla Horton	6 ft 2 in (1.88 m)	Jr		Kershaw, South Carolina

Head coach

- Pat Summitt

Assistant coach(es)

- Mickie DeMoss
- Heidi VanDerveer
- Holly Warlick

Legend

- (C) Team captain
- (S) Suspended
- (I) Ineligible
- (W) Walk-on
- Injured
- Current redshirt

Roster

== Schedule and results ==
Date time, TV	Rank^{#}	Opponent^{#}	Result	Record	Site city, state
Regular season
Nov 29, 1986*	No. 3	vs. Providence; Amana-Hawkeye Classic	W 86–70	1–0	Carver-Hawkeye Arena; Iowa City, Iowa
Nov 30, 1986*	No. 3	at No. 8 Iowa; Amana-Hawkeye Classic	W 74–56	2–0	Carver-Hawkeye Arena; Iowa City, Iowa
Dec 14, 1986*	No. 3	at No. 1 Texas	W 85–78	7–0	Frank Erwin Center; Austin, Texas
Dec 29, 1986*	No. 1	vs. No. 2 Texas; Orange Bowl/Burger King Invitational	L 74–88	10–1	James L. Knight International Center; Miami, Florida
Feb 9, 1987*	No. 7	at No. 8 Louisiana Tech	L 60–72	17–5	Thomas Assembly Center (4,770); Ruston, Louisiana
SEC tournament
Mar 5, 1987*	(4) No. 7	vs. (5) No. 14 LSU; Quarterfinals	W 64–63	23–5	Albany, Georgia
Mar 6, 1987*	(4) No. 7	vs. (1) No. 2 Auburn; Semifinals	L 96–102	23–6	Albany, Georgia
NCAA tournament
Mar 15, 1987*	(2 ME) No. 7	(7 ME) Tennessee Tech; Second round	W 95–59	24–6	Stokely Athletic Center; Knoxville, Tennessee
Mar 20, 1987*	(2 ME) No. 7	(3 ME) No. 11 Virginia; Regional Semifinal – Sweet Sixteen	W 66–58	25–6	Stokely Athletic Center; Knoxville, Tennessee
Mar 22, 1987*	(2 ME) No. 7	(1 ME) No. 2 Auburn; Regional Final – Elite Eight	W 77–61	26–6	Stokely Athletic Center; Knoxville, Tennessee
Mar 27, 1987*	(2 ME) No. 7	vs. (1 W) No. 4 Long Beach State; National Semifinal – Final Four	W 74–64	27–6	Frank Erwin Center; Austin, Texas
Mar 29, 1987*	(2 ME) No. 7	vs. (1 MW) No. 3 Louisiana Tech; National Championship	W 67–44	28–6	Frank Erwin Center; Austin, Texas
*Non-conference game. ^{#}Rankings from AP Poll. (#) Tournament seedings in parentheses. ME=Mideast.

== Rankings ==
Ranking movements Legend: ██ Increase in ranking ██ Decrease in ranking т = Tied with team above or below
	Week																
Poll	1	2	3	4	5	6	7	8	9	10	11	12	13	14	15	16	Final
AP	3	3	3	1	1	1	2	2	3	3	5	7	9	8	8	7	Not released
Coaches	3	3	3	1	1	1	2	2	3	3	6	8	8	8	8	7 т	1
