= 1986–87 NCAA Division I women's basketball rankings =

- Season: 1986–87
- NCAA Tournament: 1987
- Preseason No. 1: Texas
- NCAA Tournament Champions: Tennessee
NCAA Division I women's basketball rankings


Two human polls comprise the 1986–87 NCAA Division I women's basketball rankings, the AP Poll and the Coaches Poll, in addition to various publications' preseason polls. The AP poll is currently a poll of sportswriters, while the USA Today Coaches' Poll is a poll of college coaches. The AP conducts polls weekly through the end of the regular season and conference play, while the Coaches poll conducts a final, post-NCAA tournament poll as well.

== Legend ==
–	Not ranked
(#)	Ranking

== AP Poll ==
Team	18-Nov	2-Dec	9-Dec	16-Dec	23-Dec	30-Dec	6-Jan	13-Jan	20-Jan	27-Jan	3-Feb	10-Feb	17-Feb	24-Feb	3-Mar	10-Mar
Texas	1	1	1	3	2	2	1	1	1	1	1	1	1	1	1	1
Auburn	4	4	4	4	3	3	3	3	2	2	2	3	3	2	2	2
Louisiana Tech	2	2	2	2	5	5	6	6	7	7	8	5	4	3	3	3
Long Beach St.	7	7	7	7	8	7	7	7	5	5	4	6	5	5	4	4
Rutgers	6	5	5	5	6	6	5	5	4	4	3	2	2	4	6	5
Georgia	10	9	9	9	11	11	10	12	12	10	10	9	8	6	5	6
Tennessee	3	3	3	1	1	1	2	2	3	3	5	7	9	8	8	7
Ole Miss	15	14	12	11	10	10	8	8	8	8	7	4	6	7	7	8
Iowa	8	11	17	17	14	14	14	10	10	13	12	11	11	10	10	9
Ohio St.	16	15	13	12	16	20	18	18	17	12	11	10	10	11	11	10
Virginia	9	8	8	8	4	4	4	4	6	6	6	8	7	9	9	11
James Madison	19	17	15	18	19	18	16	16	18	18	17	15	15	13	13	12
North Carolina St.	–	20	20	20	15	15	13	14	14	11	13	14	13	16	16	13
LSU	11	10	10	10	9	8	9	9	9	9	9	12	12	14	14	14
Penn St.	14	13	14	13	12	12	11	13	13	17	16	16	16	12	12	15
Southern Ill.	–	–	–	–	20	19	17	17	16	16	14	17	17	15	15	16
Villanova	–	–	–	–	–	–	–	–	–	–	–	20	20	19	17	17
Vanderbilt	–	–	–	19	17	16	12	11	11	14	15	13	14	18	20	18
Southern California	5	6	6	6	7	9	15	15	15	15	18	18	18	–	–	19
Washington	–	–	–	–	–	–	–	–	–	–	20	19	19	17	19	20
Illinois	–	–	18	15	18	17	19	19	20	19	19	–	–	–	–	–
Maryland	17	16	16	14	13	13	20	–	–	–	–	–	–	–	–	–
Nebraska	–	–	19	–	–	–	–	–	–	–	–	–	–	–	–	–
Old Dominion	12	18	–	–	–	–	–	–	–	–	–	–	–	–	–	–
Oregon	–	–	–	–	–	–	–	–	–	–	–	–	–	20	18	–
Oregon St.	–	19	–	–	–	–	–	–	–	–	–	–	–	–	–	–
San Diego	18	–	–	–	–	–	–	–	–	–	–	–	–	–	–	–
Texas Tech	20	–	–	–	–	–	–	–	–	–	–	–	–	–	–	–
Western Ky.	13	12	11	16	–	–	–	20	19	20	–	–	–	–	–	–

== USA Today Coaches poll ==
Team	24-Nov	2-Dec	9-Dec	16-Dec	23-Dec	30-Dec	6-Jan	13-Jan	20-Jan	27-Jan	3-Feb	10-Feb	17-Feb	24-Feb	3-Mar	10-Mar	17-Mar
Tennessee	3	3	3	1	1	1	2	2	3	3	6	8	8	8	8	T7	1
Louisiana Tech	2	2	2	2	5	5	5	5	7	7	8	5	4	3	3	3	2
Texas	1	1	1	3	2	2	1	1	1	1	1	1	1	1	1	1	3
Long Beach St.	10	8	8	8	8	7	7	7	5	5	4	6	6	5	4	4	4
Rutgers	6	5	5	5	6	6	6	6	4	4	3	2	2	4	7	6	5
Auburn	5	4	4	4	3	3	3	3	2	2	2	4	3	2	2	2	6
Iowa	9	12	16	17	15	15	15	12	10	13	12	12	12	9	9	9	7
Ohio St.	15	14	13	12	14	18	17	17	15	11	11	10	10	11	11	10	8
Georgia	12	9	9	9	11	11	11	11	13	10	10	7	7	6	5	5	9
Virginia	7	7	7	7	4	4	4	4	6	6	7	9	9	10	10	11	10
Ole Miss	16	16	12	11	10	10	8	8	8	8	5	3	5	7	6	T7	11
North Carolina St.	–	20	19	19	16	14	13	15	14	12	15	15	15	17	16	13	12
Southern Ill.	–	–	–	–	19	19	16	16	17	16	14	18	17	15	14	16	13
Southern California	4	6	6	6	7	8	18	18	16	15	20	20	19	21	23	20	14
James Madison	18	T17	14	16	17	16	14	14	20	18	17	14	14	13	13	12	15
Penn St.	14	13	15	13	13	12	10	13	12	17	16	16	16	12	12	14	16
Old Dominion	8	T17	24	22	–	–	–	–	–	–	–	–	–	–	–	–	17
Washington	–	–	–	–	–	–	–	24	T23	21	18	17	18	16	19	21	18
LSU	13	11	10	10	9	9	9	9	9	9	9	13	11	14	15	15	19
Oregon	–	–	–	–	–	–	–	–	–	–	–	–	–	24	T21	23	20
Vanderbilt	–	–	–	20	18	17	12	10	11	14	13	11	13	18	T21	18	21
Villanova	–	–	–	–	–	–	–	–	–	–	23	19	20	19	17	17	22
Western Ky.	11	10	11	18	22	23	24	21	18	20	19	25	22	22	20	22	23
Saint Joseph’s	21	22	23	21	21	25	–	–	–	–	–	–	–	–	–	–	24
Duke	22	–	–	–	–	–	25	–	–	–	–	–	–	–	–	–	25
Fresno St.	–	–	–	–	–	–	–	25	–	–	24	21	–	–	–	–	–
Illinois	–	–	18	15	20	20	20	19	19	19	21	22	21	–	–	–	–
Kentucky	–	25	20	–	–	–	–	–	–	–	–	–	–	–	–	–	–
La.-Monroe	25	–	–	–	–	–	–	–	–	–	–	–	–	–	–	–	–
Maryland	17	15	17	14	12	13	19	22	25	25	–	–	–	–	–	–	–
Missouri	23	23	–	–	–	–	–	–	21	22	–	–	–	–	–	–	–
Montana	–	–	–	–	–	–	–	–	–	–	–	23	23	25	24	25	–
Nebraska	–	–	25	–	–	–	–	–	–	–	–	–	–	–	–	–	–
New Orleans	–	–	–	–	–	–	–	–	–	–	–	–	25	20	18	19	–
North Carolina	24	–	–	–	24	22	–	–	–	–	–	–	–	–	–	–	–
Oklahoma	–	–	–	–	24	21	21	20	T23	23	25	–	–	–	–	–	–
Oregon St.	–	–	21	24	23	22	22	23	22	24	22	24	–	–	–	–	–
San Diego St.	19	24	–	–	–	–	–	–	–	–	–	–	–	–	–	–	–
South Ala.	–	–	–	–	–	–	–	–	–	–	–	–	24	23	25	24	–
Stanford	–	21	–	–	–	–	–	–	–	–	–	–	–	–	–	–	–
Texas Tech	20	19	22	23	25	–	–	–	–	–	–	–	–	–	–	–	–
