= 1987 NCAA Division II men's basketball tournament =

- Teams: 32
- Finals site: , Springfield, Massachusetts
- Champions: Kentucky Wesleyan Panthers (5th title)
- Runner-up: Gannon Knights (1st title game)
- Semifinalists: Delta State Statesmen (1st Final Four); Billings State Yellow Jackets (1st Final Four)
- Winning coach: Wayne Chapman (1st title)
- MOP: Sam Smith (Kentucky Wesleyan)
- Attendance: 65,162

The 1987 NCAA Division II men's basketball tournament involved 32 schools playing in a single-elimination tournament to determine the national champion of men's NCAA Division II college basketball as a culmination of the 1986–87 NCAA Division II men's basketball season. It was won by Kentucky Wesleyan College, with Kentucky Wesleyan's Sam Smith named the Most Outstanding Player.

1987 NCAA Division II Men's sites - regionals (cyan) Quarterfinals (orange) Final Four (red)

== Regional participants ==
| School | Outcome |
|---|---|
| New Hampshire College | Regional Champion |
| New Haven | Fourth Place |
| Sacred Heart | Runner-up |
| St. Anselm | Third Place |

| School | Outcome |
|---|---|
| C.W. Post | Third Place |
| Gannon | Regional Champion |
| Millersville | Runner-up |
| St. Michael's | Fourth Place |

| School | Outcome |
|---|---|
| Alabama A&M | Fourth Place |
| Florida Southern | Regional Champion |
| Tampa | Third Place |
| West Georgia | Runner-up |

| School | Outcome |
|---|---|
| Alaska–Anchorage | Runner-up |
| Cal State Dominguez Hills | Third Place |
| Cal State Hayward | Fourth Place |
| Eastern Montana | Regional Champion |

| School | Outcome |
|---|---|
| Ferris State | Runner-up |
| Lock Haven | Third Place |
| St. Cloud State | Regional Champion |
| Wayne State (MI) | Fourth Place |

| School | Outcome |
|---|---|
| Abilene Christian | Fourth Place |
| Delta State | Regional Champion |
| Southeast Missouri State | Runner-up |
| West Texas State | Third Place |

| School | Outcome |
|---|---|
| Mount St. Mary's | Runner-up |
| Norfolk State | Regional Champion |
| UDC | Fourth Place |
| Virginia Union | Third Place |

| School | Outcome |
|---|---|
| Johnson C. Smith | Fourth Place |
| Kentucky Wesleyan | Regional Champion |
| SIU Edwardsville | Runner-up |
| Southern Indiana | Third Place |

*denotes tie

== Regionals ==
=== New England - Manchester, New Hampshire ===
Location: NHC Fieldhouse Host: New Hampshire College

Regional semifinals Round of 32; March 6
Sacred Heart | 82
St. Anselm | 80
New Hampshire College | 71
New Haven | 70

Regional Final; Sweet 16; March 7
Sacred Heart | 67
New Hampshire College | 73

- Third Place - St. Anselm 94, New Haven 88

=== East - Erie, Pennsylvania ===
Location: Hammermill Center Host: Gannon University

Regional semifinals Round of 32; March 6
Millersville | 83
St. Michael's | 76
Gannon | 80
C.W. Post | 71

Regional Final; Sweet 16; March 7
Millersville | 82
Gannon | 85

- Third Place - C.W. Post 85, St. Michael's 72

=== South - Lakeland, Florida ===
Location: Jenkins Field House Host: Florida Southern College

Regional semifinals Round of 32; March 6
West Georgia | 81
Tampa | 73
Florida Southern | 92
Alabama A&M | 83

Regional Final; Sweet 16; March 7
West Georgia | 69
Florida Southern | 84

- Third Place - Tampa 92, Alabama A&M 76

=== West - Billings, Montana ===
Location: Alterowitz Gym Host: Eastern Montana College

Regional semifinals Round of 32; March 5
Alaska–Anchorage | 68
Cal State Dominguez Hills | 64
Eastern Montana | 78
Cal State Hayward | 54

Regional Final; Sweet 16; March 6
Alaska–Anchorage | 73
Eastern Montana | 79

- Third Place - Cal State Hayward 71, Cal State Dominguez Hills 55

=== North Central - St. Cloud, Minnesota ===
Location: Halenbeck Hall Host: St. Cloud State University

Regional semifinals Round of 32; March 6
Ferris State | 70
Wayne State (MI) | 67
St. Cloud State | 81
Lock Haven | 64

Regional Final; Sweet 16; March 7
Ferris State | 69
St. Cloud State | 77

- Third Place - Lock Haven 84, Wayne State 83

=== South Central - Amarillo, Texas ===
Location: Amarillo Civic Center Host: West Texas State University

Regional semifinals Round of 32; March 5
Delta State | 88
Abilene Christian | 71
SE Missouri State | 72
West Texas State | 71

Regional Final; Sweet 16; March 6
Delta State | 90*
SE Missouri State | 84

- Third Place - West Texas State 67, Abilene Christian 63

=== South Atlantic - Norfolk, Virginia ===
Location: Joseph G. Echols Memorial Hall Host: Norfolk State University

Regional semifinals Round of 32; March 6
Norfolk State | 68
UDC | 64
Mount St. Mary's | 94
Virginia Union | 84

Regional Final; Sweet 16; March 7
Norfolk State | 70
Mount St. Mary's | 66

- Third Place - Virginia Union 99, UDC 92

=== Great Lakes - Owensboro, Kentucky ===
Location: Owensboro Sportscenter Host: Kentucky Wesleyan College

Regional semifinals Round of 32; March 6
Kentucky Wesleyan | 112
Johnson C. Smith | 77
SIU Edwardsville | 88
Southern Indiana | 82

Regional Final; Sweet 16; March 7
Kentucky Wesleyan | 89
SIU Edwardsville | 86

- Third Place - Southern Indiana 102, Johnson C. Smith 96

*denotes each overtime played

== National Quarterfinals ==
| Quarterfinal - St. Cloud, MN; Elite Eight; March 14 |
| St. Cloud State | 73 |
| Delta State | 78 |

| Quarterfinal - Norfolk, VA; Elite Eight; March 14 |
| Norfolk State | 74 |
| Kentucky Wesleyan | 80 |

| Quarterfinal - Erie, PA; Elite Eight; March 14 |
| New Hampshire College | 81 |
| Gannon | 93 |

| Quarterfinal - Billings, MT; Elite Eight; March 14 |
| Florida Southern | 62 |
| Eastern Montana | 75 |

== National Finals - Springfield, Massachusetts ==
Location: Springfield Civic Center Hosts: American International College and Springfield College

National semifinals Final Four; March 20
Gannon | 61
Eastern Montana | 55
Delta State | 75
Kentucky Wesleyan | 98

National Championship; March 21
Gannon | 74
Kentucky Wesleyan | 92

*denotes each overtime played

== All-tournament team ==
- Jerome Johnson (Eastern Montana)
- Mike Runski (Gannon)
- Sam Smith (Kentucky Wesleyan)
- Andra Whitlow (Kentucky Wesleyan)
- John Worth (Kentucky Wesleyan)

== See also ==
- 1987 NCAA Division I men's basketball tournament
- 1987 NCAA Division III men's basketball tournament
- 1987 NAIA men's basketball tournament
- 1987 NCAA Division II women's basketball tournament

== Sources ==
- 2010 NCAA Men's Basketball Championship Tournament Records and Statistics: Division II men's basketball Championship
- 1987 NCAA Division II men's basketball tournament jonfmorse.com
