= 1987 NCAA Division II women's basketball tournament =

American collegiate basketball tournament

- Teams: 24
- Finals site: , Springfield, Massachusetts
- Champions: New Haven Chargers (1st title)
- Runner-up: Cal Poly Pomona Broncos (5th title game)
- Semifinalists: Northern Kentucky Norse (1st Final Four); Pitt Johnstown Mountain Cats (1st Final Four)
- Winning coach: Jan Rossman (1st title)
- MOP: Joy Jeter (New Haven)

The 1987 NCAA Division II women's basketball tournament was the sixth annual tournament hosted by the NCAA to determine the national champion of Division II women's collegiate basketball in the United States.

New Haven defeated two-time defending champions Cal Poly Pomona in the championship game, 77–75, claiming the Chargers' first NCAA Division II national title.

The championship rounds were contested at the Springfield Civic Center in Springfield, Massachusetts, hosted by Springfield College.

== Regionals ==
=== East ===
| First round - at Millersville; Round of 24; March 7 | | Regional finals - at Pitt Johnstown; Sweet 16; March 10 |
| | | Pitt Johnstown | 59 |
| Adelphi | 63 | Millersville | 58 |
| Millersville | 73 |

=== Great Lakes ===
| First round - at Wright State; Round of 24; March 7 | | Regional finals - at Northern Kentucky; Sweet 16; March 10 |
| | | Northern Kentucky | 74 |
| Bellarmine | 67 | Wright State | 63 |
| Wright State | 80 |

=== New England ===
| First round - at Stonehill; Round of 24; March 7 | | Regional finals - at New Haven; Sweet 16; March 10 |
| | | New Haven | 72 |
| Bentley | 49 | Stonehill | 64 |
| Stonehill | 52 |

=== North Central ===
| First round - site unknown Round of 24; March 7 | | Regional finals - at North Dakota State; Sweet 16; March 10 |
| | | North Dakota State | 67 |
| Nebraska–Omaha | 60 | St. Cloud State | 65 |
| St. Cloud State | 68 |

=== South ===
| First round - at Florida International; Round of 24; March 7 | | Regional finals - at Florida International; Sweet 16; March 10 |
| | | Delta State | 75* |
| Albany State | 53 | Florida International | 73 |
| Florida International | 76 |

=== South Atlantic ===
| First round - at Mount St. Mary's; Round of 24; March 7 | | Regional finals - at Hampton; Sweet 16; March 10 |
| | | Hampton | 80 |
| Mount St. Mary's | 88 | Mount St. Mary's | 65 |
| Virginia State | 75 |

=== South Central ===
| First round - at Southeast Missouri State; Round of 24; March 7 | | Regional finals - at West Texas State; Sweet 16; March 10 |
| | | West Texas State | 67 |
| Central Missouri State | 64 | Central Missouri State | 57 |
| Southeast Missouri State | 62 |

=== West ===
| First round - at Chico State; Round of 24; March 7 | | Regional finals - at Cal Poly Pomona; Sweet 16; March 10 |
| | | Cal Poly Pomona | 56 |
| Chico State | 76 | Chico State | 44 |
| Eastern Montana | 67 |

== National Finals - Springfield, Massachusetts ==
Visiting team listed first and date March 14 in Elite Eight unless indicated

Final Four Location: Springfield Civic Center Host: Springfield College

National quarterfinals Elite Eight
SA | Hampton | 63
NE | New Haven | 65
SC | West Texas A&M | 55
GL | Northern Kentucky | 64
S | Delta State | 63
E | Pitt Johnstown | 68
March 13; March 15
NC | North Dakota State | 67
W | Cal Poly Pomona | 77

National semifinals Final Four; March 20
NE | New Haven | 77*
GL | Northern Kentucky | 74
E | Pitt Johnstown | 70
W | Cal Poly Pomona | 72

National championship March 21
NE | New Haven | 77
W | Cal Poly Pomona | 75

== All-tournament team ==
- Joy Jeter, New Haven
- Niki Bracken, Cal Poly Pomona
- Michelle McCoy, Cal Poly Pomona
- Charlene Taylor, New Haven
- Jill Halapin, Pitt Johnstown

== See also ==
- 1987 NCAA Division I women's basketball tournament
- 1987 NCAA Division III women's basketball tournament
- 1987 NAIA women's basketball tournament
- 1987 NCAA Division II men's basketball tournament
