= 1986–87 Louisiana Tech Lady Techsters basketball team =

1986-87 Louisiana Tech women's basketball season

1986–87 Louisiana Tech Lady Techsters basketball

NCAA tournament, Runner-up
- Conference: Independent

Ranking
- Coaches: No. 2
- AP: No. 3
- Record: 30–3
- Head coach: Leon Barmore (2nd season)
- Assistant coaches: Kim Mulkey; Jennifer White
- Home arena: Thomas Assembly Center

The 1986–87 Louisiana Tech Lady Techsters basketball team represented Louisiana Tech University during the 1986–87 NCAA Division I women's basketball season. The team was led by second–year head coach Leon Barmore, who led the team to a 30–3 record and the runner-up finish at the 1987 NCAA tournament. In their final season as an NCAA independent, the Lady Techsters played their home games at the Thomas Assembly Center in Ruston, Louisiana.

== Roster ==
1986–87 Louisiana Tech Lady Techsters women's basketball team
Players
Coaches

Pos.	#	Name	Height	Year	Hometown
	3	Shelia Ethridge	5 ft 8 in (1.73 m)	Fr	Ruston, Louisiana
	4	Lisa Harvey	5 ft 7 in (1.7 m)	So	Benton Harbor, Michigan
G	11	Teresa Weatherspoon	5 ft 8 in (1.73 m)	Jr	Pineland, Texas
	14	Angela Lawson	5 ft 8 in (1.73 m)	Jr	Longview, Texas
	15	Melinda Chambless	5 ft 5 in (1.65 m)	Jr	Chatham, Louisiana
	22	Phoebe Dunn	5 ft 8 in (1.73 m)	Fr	Abernathy, Texas
	23	Tatia Brown	5 ft 10 in (1.78 m)	So	Tulsa, Oklahoma
	30	Paulette Stall	5 ft 10 in (1.78 m)	So	La Crosse, Wisconsin
	33	Beanie Lincoln	6 ft 0 in (1.83 m)	So	Summerville, South Carolina
F	40	Nora Lewis	6 ft 0 in (1.83 m)	So	Peoria, Illinois
	43	Venus Lacy	6 ft 4 in (1.93 m)	Fr	Chattanooga, Tennessee
	44	Erica Westbrooks	6 ft 3 in (1.91 m)	Jr	Camden, Arkansas
	50	Jocelyn Watson	6 ft 0 in (1.83 m)	Fr	McNeil, Arkansas

Head coach

- Leon Barmore

Assistant coach(es)

- Mary Kay Hungate
- Kim Mulkey
- Jennifer White

Legend

- (C) Team captain
- (S) Suspended
- (I) Ineligible
- (W) Walk-on
- Injured
- Current redshirt

== Schedule and results ==
Date time, TV	Rank^{#}	Opponent^{#}	Result	Record	Site (attendance) city, state
Regular season
Nov 28, 1986*	No. 2	vs. Michigan State	W 79–57	1–0	Allen Fieldhouse (350); Lawrence, Kansas
Nov 29, 1986*	No. 2	at Kansas	W 56–40	2–0	Allen Fieldhouse (1,210); Lawrence, Kansas
Dec 5, 1986*	No. 2	Central Michigan	W 85–68	3–0	Thomas Assembly Center (1,860); Ruston, Louisiana
Dec 17, 1986*	No. 2	No. 9 Georgia	W 79–54	8–0	Thomas Assembly Center (3,475); Ruston, Louisiana
Dec 20, 1986*	No. 2	at No. 8 Virginia	L 66–77	8–1	University Hall (2,200); Charlottesville, Virginia
Jan 14, 1987*	No. 6	at No. 7 Long Beach State	L 95–99 ^{OT}	11–2	Gold Mine (1,769); Long Beach, California
Feb 9, 1987*	No. 8	No. 7 Tennessee	W 72–60	18–2	Thomas Assembly Center (4,770); Ruston, Louisiana
NCAA tournament
Mar 15, 1987*	(1 MW) No. 3	(8 MW) Northwestern; Second round	W 82–60	27–2	Thomas Assembly Center; Ruston, Louisiana
Mar 20, 1987*	(1 MW) No. 3	vs. (5 MW) No. 16 Southern Illinois; Regional Semifinal – Sweet Sixteen	W 66–53	28–2	Fant–Ewing Coliseum; Monroe, Louisiana
Mar 22, 1987*	(1 MW) No. 3	vs. (3 MW) No. 9 Iowa; Regional Final – Elite Eight	W 66–65	29–2	Fant–Ewing Coliseum; Monroe, Louisiana
Mar 27, 1987*	(1 MW) No. 3	at (1 E) No. 4 Texas; National Semifinal – Final Four	W 79–75	30–2	Frank Erwin Center (15,363); Austin, Texas
Mar 29, 1987*	(1 MW) No. 3	vs. (2 ME) No. 7 Tennessee; National Championship	L 44–67	30–3	Frank Erwin Center (9,823); Austin, Texas
*Non-conference game. ^{#}Rankings from AP Poll. (#) Tournament seedings in parentheses. All times are in Central.

== Rankings ==
Ranking movements Legend: ██ Increase in ranking ██ Decrease in ranking
	Week																
Poll	1	2	3	4	5	6	7	8	9	10	11	12	13	14	15	16	Final
AP	2	2	2	2	5	5	6	6	7	7	8	5	4	3	3	3	Not released
Coaches	2	2	2	2	5	5	5	5	7	7	8	5	4	3	3	3	2
