= 1986–87 Texas Longhorns women's basketball team =

Intercollegiate basketball season

1986–87 Texas Longhorns women's basketball

SWC champion SWC tournament champion Orange Bowl Invitational champion

NCAA tournament, Final Four
- Conference: Southwest Conference

Ranking
- Coaches: No. 3
- AP: No. 1
- Record: 31–2 (16–0 SWC)
- Head coach: Jody Conradt (11th season)
- Assistant coaches: Lynn Pool; Colleen Matsuhara
- Home arena: Frank Erwin Center

1986–87 Southwest Conference women's basketball standings
	Conf.				Overall
Team	W		L	PCT	W		L	PCT
No. 1 Texas †	16	–	0	1.000	31	–	2	.939
Arkansas	12	–	4	.750	20	–	12	.625
Houston	10	–	6	.625	19	–	10	.655
Texas Tech	10	–	6	.625	18	–	11	.621
Rice	7	–	9	.438	15	–	13	.536
Baylor	5	–	11	.313	8	–	20	.286
Texas A&M	5	–	11	.313	9	–	17	.346
SMU	4	–	12	.250	8	–	19	.296
TCU	3	–	13	.188	8	–	19	.296
† 1987 SWC tournament winner Rankings from AP Poll

The 1986–87 Texas Longhorns women's basketball team represented the University of Texas at Austin in the 1986–87 college basketball season. It was head coach Jody Conradt's 11th season at Texas. The Longhorns were members of the Southwest Conference and played their home games at the Frank Erwin Center. After losing a mid-December home game to Tennessee, they won 25 consecutive games before finishing the season 31–2, 16–0 in SWC play to win the regular season and SWC tournament. They received an automatic bid to the NCAA women's basketball tournament where they reached the Final Four for the second straight season.

== Roster ==
1986–87 Texas Longhorns women's basketball team
Players
Coaches

Pos.	#	Name	Height	Year	Previous school	Hometown
G	10	Beverly Williams	5 ft 8 in (1.73 m)	Jr	Del Valle	Austin, TX
G	13	Lyssa McBride	5 ft 7 in (1.7 m)	Fr	Clear Creek	Friendswood, TX
G	14	Pennee Hall	5 ft 6 in (1.68 m)	Jr	Barber Hill	Mont Belvieu, TX
C	20	Susan Anderson	6 ft 3 in (1.91 m)	Fr	Mt. Baker	Everson, WA
G	21	Paulette Moegle	5 ft 10 in (1.78 m)	Jr	San Marcos	San Marcos, TX
C	22	Ellen Bayer	6 ft 8 in (2.03 m)	Fr	Saguaro	Scottsdale, AZ
F/C	24	Clarissa Davis	6 ft 1 in (1.85 m)	So	John Jay	San Antonio, TX
F	25	Andrea Lloyd	6 ft 2 in (1.88 m)	Sr	Moscow	Moscow, ID
F	32	C.J. Jones	6 ft 1 in (1.85 m)	Jr	Rancho	Las Vegas, NV
G/F	34	Yulonda Wimbish	5 ft 9 in (1.75 m)	Jr	Victoria	Victoria, TX
F	43	Aaron Farris	5 ft 11 in (1.8 m)	Fr	Arlington Heights	Fort Worth, TX
F	44	Marie Pesch	6 ft 0 in (1.83 m)	Fr	Bovina	Bovina, TX
C	45	Michele Eglinger	6 ft 4 in (1.93 m)	Jr	Scarborough	Houston, TX
F/C	50	Doreatha Conwell	6 ft 3 in (1.91 m)	Jr	Locke	Los Angeles, CA

Head coach

Jody Conradt

Assistant coach(es)

Lynn Pool
Colleen Matsuhara
Part-Time Assistant Coach
Cherri Rapp
Student Assistant Coach
Kamie Ethridge

Legend

- (C) Team captain
- (S) Suspended
- (I) Ineligible
- (W) Walk-on
- Injured
- Current redshirt

Roster

== Schedule ==
Date time, TV	Rank^{#}	Opponent^{#}	Result	Record	Site (attendance) city, state
Regular season
Nov 28, 1986*	No. 1	vs. No. 7 Long Beach State; USC Classic	W 100–86	1–0	L.A. Sports Arena; Los Angeles, California
Nov 29, 1986*	No. 1	at No. 5 USC; USC Classic	W 89–69	2–0	L.A. Sports Arena; Los Angeles, California
Dec 1, 1986*	No. 1	at Idaho	W 87–44	3–0	Kibbie-ASUI Activity Center; Moscow, Idaho
Dec 5, 1986*	No. 1	Notre Dame; Dr. Pepper Classic	W 84–59	4–0	Frank Erwin Center; Austin, Texas
Dec 6, 1986*	No. 1	No. 15 Ohio State; Dr. Pepper Classic	W 99–78	5–0	Frank Erwin Center; Austin, Texas
Dec 9, 1986*	No. 1	at NE Louisiana	W 85–60	6–0	Fant–Ewing Coliseum; Monroe, Louisiana
Dec 14, 1986*	No. 1	No. 3 Tennessee	L 78–85	6–1	Frank Erwin Center; Austin, Texas
Dec 27, 1986*	No. 2	vs. Temple; Orange Bowl/Burger King Invitational	W 93–57	7–1	James L. Knight International Center; Miami, Florida
Dec 28, 1986*	No. 2	vs. No. 16 Ohio State; Orange Bowl/Burger King Invitational	W 97–63	8–1	James L. Knight International Center; Miami, Florida
Dec 29, 1986*	No. 2	vs. No. 1 Tennessee; Orange Bowl/Burger King Invitational	W 88–74	9–1	James L. Knight International Center; Miami, Florida
Jan 3, 1987	No. 1	Rice	W 85–53	10–1 (1–0)	Frank Erwin Center; Austin, Texas
Jan 6, 1987	No. 1	at Arkansas	W 59–56	11–1 (2–0)	Barnhill Arena; Fayetteville, Arkansas
Jan 10, 1987	No. 1	at Baylor	W 88–58	12–1 (3–0)	Ferrell Center; Waco, Texas
Jan 14, 1987	No. 1	at Texas A&M	W 94–60	13–1 (4–0)	G. Rollie White Coliseum; College Station, Texas
Jan 17, 1987	No. 1	SMU	W 93–57	14–1 (5–0)	Frank Erwin Center; Austin, Texas
Jan 19, 1987	No. 1	at TCU	W 99–67	15–1 (6–0)	Daniel–Meyer Coliseum; Fort Worth, Texas
Jan 21, 1986*	No. 1	No. 19 Western Kentucky	W 63–41	16–1	Frank Erwin Center; Austin, Texas
Jan 24, 1987	No. 1	Texas Tech	W 74–52	17–1 (7–0)	Frank Erwin Center; Austin, Texas
Jan 28, 1987	No. 1	at Houston	W 79–73	18–1 (8–0)	Hofheinz Pavilion; Houston, Texas
Jan 31, 1987	No. 1	at Rice	W 96–63	19–1 (9–0)	Tudor Fieldhouse; Houston, Texas
Feb 3, 1987	No. 1	Arkansas	W 91–65	20–1 (10–0)	Frank Erwin Center; Austin, Texas
Feb 7, 1987	No. 1	Baylor	W 92–41	21–1 (11–0)	Frank Erwin Center; Austin, Texas
Feb 10, 1987	No. 1	Texas A&M	W 96–50	22–1 (12–0)	Frank Erwin Center; Austin, Texas
Feb 14, 1987	No. 1	at SMU	W 93–57	23–1 (13–0)	Moody Coliseum; Dallas, Texas
Feb 17, 1987	No. 1	TCU	W 110–65	24–1 (14–0)	Frank Erwin Center; Austin, Texas
Feb 24, 1987	No. 1	at Texas Tech	W 74–52	25–1 (15–0)	Lubbock Municipal Coliseum; Lubbock, Texas
Mar 1, 1987	No. 1	Houston	W 60–55	26–1 (16–0)	Frank Erwin Center; Austin, Texas
SWC tournament
Mar 5, 1987*	No. 1	vs. Texas Tech; Semifinals	W 73–49	27–1	Moody Coliseum; Dallas, Texas
Mar 7, 1987*	No. 1	vs. Arkansas; Championship game	W 72–70	28–1	Moody Coliseum; Dallas, Texas
NCAA tournament
Mar 15, 1987*	(1 E) No. 1	(9 E) Saint Joseph's; Second round	W 86–56	29–1	Frank Erwin Center; Austin, Texas
Mar 19, 1987*	(1 E) No. 1	vs. (4 E) No. 12 James Madison; Regional Semifinal – Sweet Sixteen	W 91–57	30–1	Cumberland County Memorial Arena; Fayetteville, North Carolina
Mar 21, 1987*	(1 E) No. 1	vs. (2 E) No. 5 Rutgers; Regional Final – Elite Eight	W 85–77	31–1	Cumberland County Memorial Arena; Fayetteville, North Carolina
Mar 27, 1987*	(1 E) No. 1	(1 MW) No. 3 Louisiana Tech; National Semifinal – Final Four	L 75–79	31–2	Frank Erwin Center; Austin, Texas
*Non-conference game. ^{#}Rankings from AP Poll. (#) Tournament seedings in parentheses. MW=Midwest.

== Rankings ==
Ranking movements Legend: ██ Increase in ranking ██ Decrease in ranking
	Week																
Poll	1	2	3	4	5	6	7	8	9	10	11	12	13	14	15	16	Final
AP	1	1	1	3	2	2	1	1	1	1	1	1	1	1	1	1	Not released
Coaches	1	1	1	3	2	2	1	1	1	1	1	1	1	1	1	1	3

== See also ==
- Texas Longhorns women's basketball
