= Gold Mine (Long Beach) =

Arena in Long Beach, California

Coordinates: 33.783°N 118.113°W

The Gold Mine is a 1,900-seat multi-purpose arena in Long Beach, California on the campus of California State University, Long Beach. Opened in the late 1950s, it was known as University Gym and also West Gym. The Gold Mine was home to Long Beach State's basketball and volleyball teams until the Walter Pyramid opened in 1994. It used to have nearly 2400 wooden bleacher seats before a mid-80s renovation. The Gold Mine is still occasionally used for volleyball and basketball games, if there is a scheduling conflict at the Pyramid. Or as on January 17, 2023 and February 23, 2023, when heavy rains were predicted to cause a water leak at the Pyramid. Today, its primary function is for Long Beach State intramural sports and other campus events.
