= 1987 NCAA Division I women's basketball tournament =

American college basketball tournament

- Teams: 40
- Finals site: Frank Erwin Center, Austin, Texas
- Champions: Tennessee Volunteers (1st title, 2nd title game, 4th Final Four)
- Runner-up: Louisiana Tech Lady Techsters (3rd title game, 4th Final Four)
- Semifinalists: Long Beach State 49ers (1st Final Four); Texas Longhorns (2nd Final Four)
- Winning coach: Pat Summitt (1st title)
- MOP: Tonya Edwards (Tennessee)

The 1987 NCAA Division I women's basketball tournament began on March 11, ended on March 29, and featured 40 teams. The Final Four were Texas, Tennessee, Louisiana Tech, and Long Beach State, with Tennessee winning its first title with a 67–44 victory over Louisiana Tech. Tennessee's Tonya Edwards was named the Most Outstanding Player of the tournament.

== Notable events ==
Upsets were not unknown in the NCAA tournaments. For example, in the prior year, two 4 seeds made it to the Final Four. However, in the first five NCAA tournaments, once a team reached the Final Four, no team had beaten a higher seeded team. That changed in 1987.

One semifinal game matched defending National Champion Texas against Louisiana Tech. Although both teams were 1 seeds, the Texas team came into the tournament with only a single regular season loss, earning them the number one ranking in the country. In addition, the Final Four was played on the home court of the Longhorns. Despite that, and a crowd of over 15 thousand, the largest crowd in the history of the sport, the Louisiana Tech team managed to beat the Texas team 79–75. The Lady Techsters hit 58.3% of their field goals, the fourth best performance in NCAA Final Four history, and a blistering 73.9% in the second half, missing only six of the 23 shots taken in the second half. Texas tried to wear down Teresa Weatherspoon, but set an NCAA Final Four record with eleven assists, while putting in 19 points of her own.

The other semifinal game matched 2 seed Tennessee against 1 seed Long Beach State. Although Long Beach was averaging over 96 points per game, and had scored 102 in the West Regional final against Ohio State, the Lady Vols held the team to 64 points, and upset the 1 seed by a score of 74–64.

The lone loss by Texas in the regular season had been to Tennessee, ending the Longhorns 40 game win streak, but the two teams played again two weeks later, and this time Texas emerged victorious, with a 14-point victory. Tennessee earned the number one ranking in the AP vote after the win over Texas, but they began to stumble after the loss to Texas, with losses to Auburn, Ole Miss and Vanderbilt. They played Louisiana Tech in February, and the lady Techsters won by nine points, dropping the Lady Vols to ninth in the poll. The Tennessee team earned a 2 seed in the NCAA Tournament, but after their upset win against Long Beach, they faced the Louisiana Tech team again, a team that had beaten the Volunteers in 11 of the last 12 meetings. One of those meetings had been the 1981 AIAW National Championship game, when the Lady Techsters beat the Volunteers by 20 points. The 1987 Championship would turn that result on its head, as Tennessee won by 23 points, upsetting Louisiana Tech 67–44, for their first National Championship.

This was the last time Stanford did not appear in the NCAA Tournament until 2025 NCAA Division I women's basketball tournament.

== Records ==
Teresa Weatherspoon recorded 11 assists in the National Semifinal game, the most scored in a Final Four game since they started keeping records of this statistic in 1985.

== Qualifying teams – automatic ==
Forty teams were selected to participate in the 1987 NCAA Tournament. Eighteen conferences were eligible for an automatic bid to the 1987 NCAA tournament.

Automatic bids
		Record		
Qualifying school	Conference	Regular Season	Conference	Seed
Auburn University	SEC	29–1	8–1	1
Bowling Green State University	MAC	27–2	16–0	9
Eastern Washington University	Mountain West	18–11	8–4	10
James Madison University	Colonial	26–3	12–0	4
University of Kansas	Big Eight	19–12	9–5	7
California State University, Long Beach	Pacific Coast	30–2	17–1	7
Manhattan College	MAAC	20–10	6–6	10
New Mexico State University	High Country	23–6	10–2	9
North Carolina State University	ACC	23–6	11–3	3
Northeast Louisiana	Southland Conference	14–9	9–1	10
Ohio State University	Big Ten	24–4	17–1	2
Old Dominion University	Sun Belt Conference	17–12	5–1	5
Rutgers University	Atlantic 10	28–2	17–1	2
University of Southern California	Pac-10	21–7	15–3	3
Southern Illinois University Carbondale	Missouri Valley Conference	27–2	18–0	5
University of Southern Mississippi	Metro	21–8	6–6	10
Tennessee Technological University	Ohio Valley Conference	23–6	12–2	7
University of Texas at Austin	Southwest	28–1	16–0	1
Villanova University	Big East	27–3	15–1	6

== Qualifying teams – at-large ==
Twenty-two additional teams were selected to complete the forty invitations.

At-large bids
		Record		
Qualifying school	Conference	Regular Season	Conference	Seed
Duke University	Atlantic Coast	18–9	7–7	7
University of Georgia	Southeastern	26–4	7–2	2
University of Illinois at Urbana–Champaign	Big Ten	18–9	11–7	8
University of Iowa	Big Ten	24–4	17–1	3
Kansas State University	Big Eight	22–8	9–5	8
Louisiana State University	Southeastern	20–7	6–3	4
Louisiana Tech University	Independent	26–2	–-	1
University of Memphis	Metro	20–8	10–2	6
University of Mississippi (Ole Miss)	Southeastern	24–4	7–2	4
University of New Orleans	Independent	25–6	–-	6
University of North Carolina at Chapel Hill	Atlantic Coast	19–9	9–5	4
Northwestern University	Big Ten	19–9	12–6	9
University of Oregon	Pacific-10	22–6	14–4	7
Pennsylvania State University	Atlantic 10	23–6	16–2	5
Saint Joseph's University	Atlantic 10	22–8	14–4	9
University of South Alabama	Sun Belt	24–5	5–1	8
University of Tennessee	Southeastern	23–6	6–3	2
Vanderbilt University	Southeastern	23–9	4–5	5
University of Virginia	Atlantic Coast	25–4	12–2	3
University of Washington	Pacific-10	22–6	14–4	8
Western Kentucky University	Sun Belt	24–8	4–2	6

== Bids by conference ==
Nineteen conferences earned an automatic bid. In eleven cases, the automatic bid was the only representative from the conference. Nineteen at-large teams were selected from eight of the conferences. In addition, two independent (not associated with an athletic conference) teams earned at-large bids.

Bids	Conference	Teams
6	Southeastern	Auburn, Georgia, LSU, Ole Miss, Tennessee, Vanderbilt
4	Big Ten	Illinois, Iowa, Northwestern, Ohio St.
4	Atlantic Coast	Duke, North Carolina, North Carolina St., Virginia
3	Sun Belt	Old Dominion, South Ala., Western Kentucky
3	Pacific-10	Oregon, Southern California, Washington
3	Atlantic 10	Penn St., Rutgers, St. Joseph's
2	Metro	Memphis, Southern Miss.
2	Independent	Louisiana Tech, New Orleans
2	Big Eight	Kansas, Kansas St.
1	Southwest	Texas
1	Pacific Coast	Long Beach St.
1	Ohio Valley	Tennessee Tech
1	Mountain West	Eastern Washington
1	Missouri Valley	Southern Ill.
1	Mid-American	Bowling Green
1	Metro Atlantic	Manhattan
1	High Country	New Mexico St.
1	Gulf Star	Northwestern St.
1	Colonial	James Madison
1	Big East	Villanova

== First and second rounds ==
In 1987, the field remained at 40 teams. The teams were seeded, and assigned to four geographic regions, with seeds 1–10 in each region. In Round 1, seeds 8 and 9 faced each other for the opportunity to face the 1 seed in the second round, while seeds 7 and 10 faced each other for the opportunity to face the 2 seed. In the first two rounds, the higher seed was given the opportunity to host the first-round game. In most cases, the higher seed accepted the opportunity. The exceptions:

- Eighth seeded South Alabama played nine seed Saint Joseph's (PA) at Saint Joseph's (PA)
- Seventh seeded Eastern Washington played tenth seeded University of Oregon at University of Oregon
- Second seeded Ohio State played tenth seeded University of Oregon at University of Oregon
- Third seeded North Carolina State played sixth seeded Villanova at Villanova

Because Oregon hosted both a first and second-round game, there were only 23 first and second round locations, rather than 24.

The following table lists the region, host school, venue and the twenty-four first round locations:

1987 NCAA first round (Philadelphia and Villanova are almost indistinguishable)
1987 NCAA second round

Region	Rnd	Host	Venue	City	State
East	1	Saint Joseph's University	Alumni Memorial Fieldhouse	Philadelphia	Pennsylvania
East	1	Duke University	Cameron Indoor Stadium	Durham	North Carolina
East	2	University of Texas	Frank Erwin Center	Austin	Texas
East	2	Rutgers University	Louis Brown Athletic Center	Piscataway	New Jersey
East	2	James Madison University	James Madison University Convocation Center	Harrisonburg	Virginia
East	2	Villanova University	The Pavilion	Villanova	Pennsylvania
Mideast	1	University of Illinois	Assembly Hall (Champaign)	Champaign	Illinois
Mideast	1	Tennessee Tech	Eblen Center	Cookeville	Tennessee
Mideast	2	University of North Carolina	Carmichael Auditorium	Chapel Hill	North Carolina
Mideast	2	Auburn University	Memorial Coliseum (Beard–Eaves–Memorial Coliseum)	Auburn	Alabama
Mideast	2	University of Tennessee	Stokely Athletic Center	Knoxville	Tennessee
Mideast	2	University of Virginia	University Hall (University of Virginia)	Charlottesville	Virginia
Midwest	1	Northwestern University	Welsh-Ryan Arena	Evanston	Illinois
Midwest	2	University of Iowa	Carver–Hawkeye Arena	Iowa City	Iowa
Midwest	2	University of Louisiana at Monroe	Ewing Coliseum	Monroe	Louisiana
Midwest	2	University of Georgia	Georgia Coliseum (Stegeman Coliseum)	Athens	Georgia
Midwest	2	Louisiana State University	LSU Assembly Center (Pete Maravich Assembly Center)	Baton Rouge	Louisiana
Midwest	2	Louisiana Tech University	Thomas Assembly Center	Ruston	Louisiana
West	1	University of Washington	Hec Edmundson Pavilion	Seattle	Washington
West	1	University of Oregon	McArthur Court	Eugene	Oregon
West	2	University of Southern California	Los Angeles Memorial Sports Arena	Los Angeles	California
West	2	University of Mississippi (Ole Miss)	Tad Smith Coliseum	Oxford	Mississippi
West	2	Long Beach State	University Gym (Gold Mine)	Long Beach	California

== Regionals and Final Four ==
1987 NCAA regionals and Final Four

The regionals, named for the general location, were held from March 19 to March 22 at these sites:

- Mideast Regional Stokely Athletics Center, Knoxville, Tennessee (Host: University of Tennessee)
- Midwest Regional Ewing Coliseum, Monroe, Louisiana (Host: University of Louisiana at Monroe)
- West Regional Pauley Pavilion, Los Angeles (Host: University of Southern California)
- East Regional Cumberland County Memorial Arena, Fayetteville, North Carolina

Each regional champion advanced to the Final Four at the Frank Erwin Center in Austin, Texas. The University of Texas served as the host institution.

== Bids by state ==
The forty teams came from twenty states. Louisiana and Tennessee had the most teams with four each. Thirty states did not have any teams receiving bids.

NCAA Women's basketball Tournament invitations by state 1987

Bids	State	Teams
4	Louisiana	Northwestern St., LSU, Louisiana Tech, New Orleans
4	Tennessee	Tennessee Tech, Memphis, Tennessee, Vanderbilt
3	Illinois	Southern Ill., Illinois, Northwestern
3	North Carolina	North Carolina St., Duke, North Carolina
3	Pennsylvania	Villanova, Penn St., St. Joseph's
3	Virginia	James Madison, Old Dominion, Virginia
2	Alabama	Auburn, South Ala.
2	California	Southern California, Long Beach St.
2	Kansas	Kansas, Kansas St.
2	Mississippi	Ole Miss, Southern Miss.
2	Ohio	Bowling Green, Ohio St.
2	Washington	Eastern Washington, Washington
1	Georgia	Georgia
1	Iowa	Iowa
1	Kentucky	Western Kentucky
1	New Jersey	Rutgers
1	New Mexico	New Mexico St.
1	New York	Manhattan
1	Oregon	Oregon
1	Texas	Texas

== Brackets ==
First and second-round games played at higher seed except where noted.

=== East regional – Fayetteville, North Carolina (Cumberland County Memorial Arena) ===
First round March 11
8	South Alabama	56
9	at St. Joseph's	67*
7	Duke	70
10	Manhattan	55

Second round March 13–15
9	St. Joseph's	56
1	Texas	86
5	Vanderbilt	60
4	James Madison	68
7	Duke	64
2	Rutgers	78
3	North Carolina State	68
6	at Villanova	67

Regional semifinals March 19–20
1	Texas	91
4	James Madison	57
2	Rutgers	75
3	North Carolina State	60

Regional finals March 21
1	Texas	85
2	Rutgers	77

=== Midwest regional – Northeast Louisiana University – Monroe, Louisiana (Fant–Ewing Coliseum) ===
First round March 11
8	Northwestern	62
9	Kansas State	61*
7	Kansas	78
10	Northeast Louisiana	72

Second round March 13–15
8	Northwestern	60
1	Louisiana Tech	82
5	Southern Illinois	70
4	LSU	56
7	Kansas	51
2	Georgia	82
3	Iowa	68
6	New Orleans	46

Regional semifinals March 19–20
1	Louisiana Tech	66
5	Southern Illinois	53
2	Georgia	60
3	Iowa	62

Regional finals March 22
1	Louisiana Tech	66
3	Iowa	65

=== Mideast regional – University of Tennessee – Knoxville, Tennessee (Stokely Athletic Center) ===
First round March 11
8	Illinois	80
9	Bowling Green	64
7	Tennessee Tech	78
10	Southern Mississippi	66

Second round March 13–15
8	Illinois	58
1	Auburn	92
5	Old Dominion	76
4	North Carolina	58
7	Tennessee Tech	59
2	Tennessee	95
3	Virginia	76
6	Memphis State	75

Regional semifinals March 19–20
1	Auburn	77
5	Old Dominion	61
2	Tennessee	66
3	Virginia	58

Regional finals March 22
1	Auburn	61
2	Tennessee	77

=== West regional – University of Southern California – Los Angeles (Pauley Pavilion) ===
First round March 11
8	Washington	86
9	New Mexico State	73
7	Eastern Washington	56
10	at Oregon	75

Second round March 13–15
8	Washington	57
1	Long Beach State	72
5	Penn State	75
4	Ole Miss	80
10	at Oregon	62
2	Ohio State	76
3	USC	81
6	Western Kentucky	69

Regional semifinals March 19–20
1	Long Beach State	94
4	Ole Miss	55
2	Ohio State	74
3	USC	63

Regional finals March 22
1	Long Beach State	102
2	Ohio State	82

=== Final Four – University of Texas – Austin, Texas (Frank Erwin Center) ===
National semifinals March 27
1E	Texas	75
1MW	Louisiana Tech	79
2ME	Tennessee	74
1W	Long Beach State	64

National championship March 29
1MW	Louisiana Tech	44
2ME	Tennessee	67

== Record by conference ==
Fifteen conferences had more than one bid, or at least one win in NCAA Tournament play:

Conference	# of Bids	Record	Win %	Round of 32	Sweet Sixteen	Elite Eight	Final Four	Championship Game
Southeastern	6	9–5	.643	6	4	2	1	1
Big Ten	4	6–4	.600	4	2	2	–	–
Atlantic Coast	4	3–4	.429	4	2	–	–	–
Atlantic 10	3	3–3	.500	3	1	1	–	–
Pacific-10	3	3–3	.500	3	1	–	–	–
Sun Belt	3	1–3	.250	2	1	–	–	–
Independent	2	4–2	.667	2	1	1	1	1
Big Eight	2	1–2	.333	1	–	–	–	–
Metro	2	0–2	–	1	–	–	–	–
Pacific Coast	1	3–1	.750	1	1	1	1	–
Southwest	1	3–1	.750	1	1	1	1	–
Colonial	1	1–1	.500	1	1	–	–	–
Gateway	1	1–1	.500	1	1	–	–	–
Ohio Valley	1	1–1	.500	1	–	–	–	–

Six conferences went 0-1: Big East, Gulf Star Conference, High Country, MAAC, MAC, and Mountain West

== All-Tournament team ==
- Tonya Edwards, Tennessee,
- Bridgette Gordon, Tennessee
- Cindy Brown, Long Beach St.
- Clarissa Davis, Texas
- Teresa Weatherspoon, Louisiana Tech

== Game officials ==
- Bill Stokes (semifinal)
- Larry Sheppard (semifinal)
- June Courteau (Semi-Final, Final)
- Patty Broderick (Semi-Final, Final)

== See also ==
- 1987 NCAA Division I men's basketball tournament
- 1987 NCAA Division II women's basketball tournament
- 1987 NCAA Division III women's basketball tournament
- 1987 NAIA women's basketball tournament
