= NCAA Division I women's basketball tournament =

Annual college basketball tournament for women

- Most recent season or competition: 2026 NCAA Division I women's basketball tournament
- Sport: Basketball
- Founded: 1982; 44 years ago
- First season: 1982
- Organizing body: NCAA
- No. of teams: 76
- Most recent champion: UCLA (1st title) (2026)
- Most titles: UConn (12)
- Broadcasters: ABC, ESPN, ESPN2, ESPNU, ESPNEWS
- Streaming partner: ESPN+
- Level on pyramid: 1
- Website: ncaa.com/basketball

The NCAA Division I women's basketball tournament, sometimes referred to as Women's March Madness, is a single-elimination tournament played each spring in the United States, currently featuring 76 women's college basketball teams from the Division I level of the National Collegiate Athletic Association (NCAA), to determine the national championship.

The tournament was preceded by the AIAW women's basketball tournament, which was organized by the Association for Intercollegiate Athletics for Women (AIAW) from 1972 to 1982. Basketball was one of 12 women's sports added to the NCAA championship program for the 1981–82 school year, as the NCAA engaged in battle with the AIAW for sole governance of women's collegiate sports. The AIAW continued to conduct its established championship program in the same 12 (and other) sports; however, after a year of dual women's championships, the NCAA prevailed, while the AIAW disbanded.

As of the upcoming 2027 edition, the tournament follows almost exactly the same format and selection process as its men's counterpart, with 32 automatic bids awarded to the champions of the Division I conferences, and 44 "at-large bids" extended by the NCAA Selection Committee, which are placed into four regional divisions and seeded from 1 to 16. The 12 lowest-seeded automatic bids, and the 12 lowest-seeded at-large bids, compete in the Opening Round games to advance to the 64-team bracket in the first round. The national semi-finals, branded as the Women's Final Four, are traditionally scheduled on the same weekend as the men's Final Four, but in a different host city. Presently, the Women's Final Four uses a Friday/Sunday scheduling, with its games occurring one day prior to the men's Final Four and championship, respectively.

Attendance and interest in the women's championship have grown over the years, especially from 2003 to 2016, when the final championship game was moved to the Tuesday following the Monday men's championship game. The tournament is often overshadowed by the more prominent men's tournament; after a gender equality review following the 2021 tournament, the NCAA expanded it to the then-current 68-team format of the men's tournament and extended the "March Madness" branding to the tournament as well. Both tournaments were expanded to 76 teams starting with the 2027 editions. The 2024 women's championship was the first to receive higher viewership than the men's championship the same year. Still, the tournament receives a smaller amount of funding from broadcast rights (which are held by ESPN, and are pooled with those of other NCAA Division I championships besides golf and men's basketball) and sponsorship (which are sold by CBS and Turner Sports) than the men's tournament.

With 12 national titles, the UConn Huskies hold the record for the most NCAA Women's Division I Basketball Championships, which includes a record four consecutive championships from 2013 through 2016. The team had also made the semi-finals for a record 14 consecutive tournaments. The Tennessee Lady Volunteers are the only team to make an appearance in every tournament since its founding in 1982.

== Tournament format ==
From 1982 to 1990, 1996 to 2002, 2017 to 2019, and since 2021, the Women's Final Four is usually played on the Friday before the Men's Final Four or the hours before the men played on the final Saturday of the tournament. The final, since 2023, is played the Sunday afternoon following the Men's Final Four; from 2017 to 2019, 2021 and 2022, it was Sunday evening.

The tournament bracket is made up of champions from each Division I conference, which are automatic bids. The remaining slots are at-large bids, with teams chosen by an NCAA selection committee. The selection process and tournament seedings are based on several factors, including team rankings, win–loss records, and NET data.

Since 2026, 76 teams qualify for the tournament played in March and April. Of these teams, 32 earn automatic bids by winning their respective conference tournaments. Since 2017, the Ivy League conducts its own post-season tournament. The remaining teams are granted "at-large" bids, which are extended by the NCAA Selection Committee. Dr. Marilyn McNeil, vice president/director of athletics at Monmouth University is the current chairwoman. On March 1, 2011, Bowling Green State University's director of intercollegiate athletics, Greg Christopher, was appointed chair of the NCAA Division I Women's Basketball Committee during the 2011–12 academic year.

The tournament begins with 12 games known as the Opening Round. From 2022–2026, the women's tournament had four opening round games branded as the First Four. Under both the 68- and 76-team formats, the men's and women's First Four/Opening Round have used essentially identical formats. In the First Four era, the four lowest-ranked conference champions played for 16 seeds in the round of 64, and the four lowest-ranked at-large teams played for their own spots in the round of 64. Starting in 2027, the 12 lowest-ranked conference champions play for seeds 14 through 16, and the 12 lowest-ranked at-large teams will play for their own spots in the round of 64.

The tournament is split into four regional tournaments, and each regional has teams seeded from 1 to 16, with the committee ostensibly making every region as comparable to the others as possible. The top-seeded team in each region plays the #16 team, the #2 team plays the #15, etc. (meaning that all first-round games involve teams whose seeds add up to 17).

== Number of teams, and seeding ==
The first NCAA women's basketball tournament was held in 1982. The AIAW also held a basketball tournament in 1982, but most of the top teams, including defending AIAW champion Louisiana Tech, decided to participate in the NCAA tournament.

The championship consisted of 32 teams from 1982 to 1985 (in 1983, 36), 40 teams from 1986 to 1988, and 48 teams from 1989 to 1993. From 1994 to 2021, 64 teams competed in each tournament. From 2022 to 2026, the tournament featured 68 teams, matching the size of the D-I men's tournament. From 2027, both the men's and women's tournaments involve 76 teams.

Prior to 1996, seeding was conducted on a regional basis. The top teams (eight in the 32-, 40-, and 48-team formats, and 16 in the 64-team format) were ranked and seeded on a national basis. The remaining teams were then seeded based on their geographic region. Teams were moved outside of its geographic region only if it was necessary to balance the bracket, or if the proximity of an opponent outside of its region would be comparable and a more competitive game would result. In 1993, all teams except for the top four were explicitly unseeded. The regional seeding resumed in 1994. In 1996, seeds were assigned on a national basis using an "S-Curve" format similar to the process used in selecting the field for the men's tournament.

The most significant difference between bracketing for the men's and women's tournaments was introduced to the women's tournament for 2027 and beyond. The top 16 teams in the selection committee's ranking will be placed in regionals based solely on their actual seeding, with no regard for conference affiliation.

The following table summarizes some of the key attributes of the seeding process:

| | Number of teams selected | | | | |
| Year | Automatic | At-large | Total | Location of first round(s) | Seeding Basis |
|---|---|---|---|---|---|
| 1982 | 12 | 20 | 32 | Higher seed | Regional |
| 1983 | 14 | 22 | 36 | Higher seed (Note: Some exceptions. Due to venue availability, in some cases, the lower seed hosted, or the game was played at a neutral site.) | Regional |
| 1984 | 17 | 15 | 32 | Higher seed | Regional |
| 1985 | 18 | 14 | 32 | Higher seed | Regional |
| 1986 | 17 | 23 | 40 | Higher seed | Regional |
| 1987 | 18 | 22 | 40 | Higher seed | Regional |
| 1988 | 18 | 22 | 40 | Higher seed | Regional |
| 1989 | 19 | 29 | 48 | Higher seed | Regional |
| 1990 | 21 | 27 | 48 | Higher seed | Regional |
| 1991 | 21 | 27 | 48 | Higher seed | Regional |
| 1992 | 22 | 26 | 48 | Higher seed | Regional |
| 1993 | 23 | 25 | 48 | Higher seed | Regional |
| 1994 | 32 | 32 | 64 | Higher seed | Regional |
| 1995 | 32 | 32 | 64 | Higher seed | Regional |
| 1996 | 31 | 33 | 64 | Higher seed | National |
| 1997 | 30 | 34 | 64 | Higher seed | National |
| 1998 | 30 | 34 | 64 | Higher seed | National |
| 1999 | 30 | 34 | 64 | Higher seed | National |
| 2000 | 30 | 34 | 64 | Higher seed | National |
| 2001 | 31 | 33 | 64 | Higher seed | National |
| 2002 | 31 | 33 | 64 | Higher seed | National |
| 2003 | 31 | 33 | 64 | 16 Sites (Note: From 2003 to 2014, sixteen predetermined sites were selected for first and second-round games. Teams were allowed to play at home, if hosting. Between 2005 and 2008, eight sites were used for first-round games.) | National |
| 2004 | 31 | 33 | 64 | 16 Sites | National |
| 2005 | 31 | 33 | 64 | 8 Sites | National |
| 2006 | 31 | 33 | 64 | 8 Sites | National |
| 2007 | 31 | 33 | 64 | 8 Sites | National |
| 2008 | 31 | 33 | 64 | 8 Sites | National |
| 2009 | 31 | 33 | 64 | 16 Sites | National |
| 2010 | 31 | 33 | 64 | 16 Sites | National |
| 2011 | 31 | 33 | 64 | 16 Sites | National |
| 2012 | 31 | 33 | 64 | 16 Sites | National |
| 2013 | 31 | 33 | 64 | 16 Sites | National |
| 2014 | 32 | 32 | 64 | 16 Sites | National |
| 2015 | 32 | 32 | 64 | Higher seed | National |
| 2016 | 32 | 32 | 64 | Higher seed | National |
| 2017 | 32 | 32 | 64 | Higher seed | National |
| 2018 | 32 | 32 | 64 | Higher seed | National |
| 2019 | 32 | 32 | 64 | Higher seed | National |
| 2020 | Cancelled due to the COVID-19 pandemic. | | | | |
| 2021 | 31 (Note: Ivy League cancelled all winter athletics due to COVID-19.) | 33 | 64 | 5 Sites (Note: Due to COVID-19, the entire tournament was played in Texas with the first two rounds having games played between 5 venues in and around the San Antonio area, with the last four rounds having all games played at the Alamodome.) | National |
| 2022 | 32 | 36 | 68 | Higher seed | National |
| 2023 | 32 | 36 | 68 | Higher seed | National |
| 2024 | 32 | 36 | 68 | Higher seed | National |
| 2025 | 31 | 37 | 68 | Higher seed | National |
| 2026 | 31 | 37 | 68 | Higher seed | National |
| 2027 | 32 | 44 | 76 | Higher seed | National |

== Selection process ==
A special selection committee appointed by the NCAA determines which 76 teams will enter the tournament, and where they will be seeded and placed in the bracket. Because of the automatic bids, only 44 teams (the at-large bids) rely on the selection committee to secure them a spot in the tournament.

== Women's NCAA Division I basketball champions ==
Legend for "Championship games" table below
| Indicator | Meaning |
|---|---|
| ^{OT} | Game was decided in an overtime period |
| Score | Each score is linked to an article about that particular championship game, when available |
| Year | Each year is linked to an article about that particular NCAA Tournament |

| Year | Winner | Score | Opponent | Venue | Other semifinalists |
|---|---|---|---|---|---|
| 1982 | Louisiana Tech (1, 1–0) | 76–62 | Cheyney State (1, 0–1) | Norfolk Scope (Norfolk, Virginia) | Tennessee & Maryland |
| 1983 | USC (1, 1–0) | 69–67 | Louisiana Tech (2, 1–1) | Norfolk Scope (Norfolk, Virginia) | Old Dominion & Georgia |
| 1984 | USC (2, 2–0) | 72–61 | Tennessee (1, 0–1) | Pauley Pavilion (Los Angeles, California) | Cheyney State & Louisiana Tech |
| 1985 | Old Dominion (1, 1–0) | 70–65 | Georgia (1, 0–1) | Frank Erwin Center (Austin, Texas) | Western Kentucky & Northeast Louisiana (Note: Known as Louisiana–Monroe since 1999–2000; alternately branded athletically as ULM.) |
| 1986 | Texas (1, 1–0) | 97–81 | USC (3, 2–1) | Rupp Arena (Lexington, Kentucky) | Western Kentucky & Tennessee |
| 1987 | Tennessee (2, 1–1) | 67–44 | Louisiana Tech (3, 1–2) | Frank Erwin Center (Austin, Texas) | Texas & Long Beach State |
| 1988 | Louisiana Tech (4, 2–2) | 56–54 | Auburn (1, 0–1) | Tacoma Dome (Tacoma, Washington) | Long Beach State & Tennessee |
| 1989 | Tennessee (3, 2–1) | 76–60 | Auburn (2, 0–2) | Tacoma Dome (Tacoma, Washington) | Louisiana Tech & Maryland |
| 1990 | Stanford (1, 1–0) | 88–81 | Auburn (3, 0–3) | Thompson–Boling Arena (Knoxville, Tennessee) | Virginia & Louisiana Tech |
| 1991 | Tennessee (4, 3–1) | 70–67^{OT} | Virginia (1, 0–1) | Lakefront Arena (New Orleans, Louisiana) | Connecticut (Note: Branded athletically as "UConn" since the 2013–14 season.) & Stanford |
| 1992 | Stanford (2, 2–0) | 78–62 | Western Kentucky (1, 0–1) | Los Angeles Memorial Sports Arena (Los Angeles, California) | Southwest Missouri State (Note: Known as Missouri State since 2005–06.) & Virginia |
| 1993 | Texas Tech (1, 1–0) | 84–82 | Ohio State (1, 0–1) | Omni Coliseum (Atlanta, Georgia) | Iowa & Vanderbilt |
| 1994 | North Carolina (1, 1–0) | 60–59 | Louisiana Tech (5, 2–3) | Richmond Coliseum (Richmond, Virginia) | Purdue & Alabama |
| 1995 | UConn (1, 1–0) | 70–64 | Tennessee (5, 3–2) | Target Center (Minneapolis, Minnesota) | Stanford & Georgia |
| 1996 | Tennessee (6, 4–2) | 83–65 | Georgia (2, 0–2) | Charlotte Coliseum (Charlotte, North Carolina) | Connecticut & Stanford |
| 1997 | Tennessee (7, 5–2) | 68–59 | Old Dominion (2, 1–1) | Riverfront Coliseum (Cincinnati, Ohio) | Notre Dame & Stanford |
| 1998 | Tennessee (8, 6–2) | 93–75 | Louisiana Tech (6, 2–4) | Kemper Arena (Kansas City, Missouri) | Arkansas & North Carolina State |
| 1999 | Purdue (1, 1–0) | 62–45 | Duke (1, 0–1) | San Jose Arena (San Jose, California) | Louisiana Tech & Georgia |
| 2000 | UConn (2, 2–0) | 71–52 | Tennessee (9, 6–3) | First Union Center (Philadelphia, Pennsylvania) | Rutgers & Penn State |
| 2001 | Notre Dame (1, 1–0) | 68–66 | Purdue (2, 1–1) | Savvis Center (St. Louis, Missouri) | Connecticut & Southwest Missouri State |
| 2002 | UConn (3, 3–0) | 82–70 | Oklahoma (1, 0–1) | Alamodome (San Antonio, Texas) | Tennessee & Duke |
| 2003 | UConn (4, 4–0) | 73–68 | Tennessee (10, 6–4) | Georgia Dome (Atlanta, Georgia) | Texas & Duke |
| 2004 | UConn (5, 5–0) | 70–61 | Tennessee (11, 6–5) | New Orleans Arena (New Orleans, Louisiana) | Minnesota & LSU |
| 2005 | Baylor (1, 1–0) | 84–62 | Michigan State (1, 0–1) | RCA Dome (Indianapolis, Indiana) | LSU & Tennessee |
| 2006 | Maryland (1, 1–0) | 78–75^{OT} | Duke (2, 0–2) | TD Banknorth Garden (Boston, Massachusetts) | North Carolina & LSU |
| 2007 | Tennessee (12, 7–5) | 59–46 | Rutgers (1, 0–1) | Quicken Loans Arena (Cleveland, Ohio) | North Carolina & LSU |
| 2008 | Tennessee (13, 8–5) | 64–48 | Stanford (3, 2–1) | St. Pete Times Forum (Tampa, Florida) | LSU & Connecticut |
| 2009 | UConn (6, 6–0) | 76–54 | Louisville (1, 0–1) | Scottrade Center (St. Louis, Missouri) | Stanford & Oklahoma |
| 2010 | UConn (7, 7–0) | 53–47 | Stanford (4, 2–2) | Alamodome (San Antonio, Texas) | Baylor & Oklahoma |
| 2011 | Texas A&M (1, 1–0) | 76–70 | Notre Dame (2, 1–1) | Conseco Fieldhouse (Indianapolis, Indiana) | Connecticut & Stanford |
| 2012 | Baylor (2, 2–0) | 80–61 | Notre Dame (3, 1–2) | Pepsi Center (Denver, Colorado) | Stanford & Connecticut |
| 2013 | UConn (8, 8–0) | 93–60 | Louisville (2, 0–2) | New Orleans Arena (New Orleans, Louisiana) | Notre Dame & California |
| 2014 | UConn (9, 9–0) | 79–58 | Notre Dame (4, 1–3) | Bridgestone Arena (Nashville, Tennessee) | Stanford & Maryland |
| 2015 | UConn (10, 10–0) | 63–53 | Notre Dame (5, 1–4) | Amalie Arena (Tampa, Florida) | South Carolina & Maryland |
| 2016 | UConn (11, 11–0) | 82–51 | Syracuse (1, 0–1) | Bankers Life Fieldhouse (Indianapolis, Indiana) | Oregon State & Washington |
| 2017 | South Carolina (1, 1–0) | 67–55 | Mississippi State (1, 0–1) | American Airlines Center (Dallas, Texas) | UConn & Stanford |
| 2018 | Notre Dame (6, 2–4) | 61–58 | Mississippi State (2, 0–2) | Nationwide Arena (Columbus, Ohio) | UConn & Louisville |
| 2019 | Baylor (3, 3–0) | 82–81 | Notre Dame (7, 2–5) | Amalie Arena (Tampa, Florida) | UConn & Oregon |
| 2020 | Tournament canceled due to the COVID-19 pandemic | | | Smoothie King Center (New Orleans, Louisiana) | —N/a |
| 2021 | Stanford (5, 3–2) | 54–53 | Arizona (1, 0–1) | Alamodome (San Antonio, Texas) | UConn & South Carolina |
| 2022 | South Carolina (2, 2–0) | 64–49 | UConn (12, 11–1) | Target Center (Minneapolis, Minnesota) | Stanford & Louisville |
| 2023 | LSU (1, 1–0) | 102–85 | Iowa (1, 0–1) | American Airlines Center (Dallas, Texas) | South Carolina & Virginia Tech |
| 2024 | South Carolina (3, 3–0) | 87–75 | Iowa (2, 0–2) | Rocket Mortgage FieldHouse (Cleveland, Ohio) | UConn & North Carolina State |
| 2025 | UConn (13, 12–1) | 82–59 | South Carolina (4, 3–1) | Amalie Arena (Tampa, Florida) | UCLA & Texas |
| 2026 | UCLA (1, 1–0) | 79–51 | South Carolina (5, 3–2) | Mortgage Matchup Center (Phoenix, Arizona) | UConn & Texas |
| 2027 | | | | Nationwide Arena (Columbus, Ohio) | |
| 2028 | | | | Lucas Oil Stadium (Indianapolis, Indiana) | |
| 2029 | | | | Alamodome (San Antonio, Texas) | |
| 2030 | | | | Moda Center (Portland, Oregon) | |
| 2031 | | | | American Airlines Center (Dallas, Texas) | |

== Team titles ==
Schools that have won the NCAA Division I women's basketball championship
12, 8, 3, 2, 1

| Team | # | Years |
|---|---|---|
| UConn | 12 | 1995, 2000, 2002, 2003, 2004, 2009, 2010, 2013, 2014, 2015, 2016, 2025 |
| Tennessee | 8 | 1987, 1989, 1991, 1996, 1997, 1998, 2007, 2008 |
| Baylor | 3 | 2005, 2012, 2019 |
| South Carolina | 3 | 2017, 2022, 2024 |
| Stanford | 3 | 1990, 1992, 2021 |
| Louisiana Tech | 2 | 1982, 1988 |
| Notre Dame | 2 | 2001, 2018 |
| USC | 2 | 1983, 1984 |
| LSU | 1 | 2023 |
| Maryland | 1 | 2006 |
| North Carolina | 1 | 1994 |
| Old Dominion | 1 | 1985 |
| Purdue | 1 | 1999 |
| Texas | 1 | 1986 |
| Texas A&M | 1 | 2011 |
| Texas Tech | 1 | 1993 |
| UCLA | 1 | 2026 |

=== Multiple NCAA championship coaches ===
| Coach | School | Championships |
|---|---|---|
| Geno Auriemma | UConn | 12 |
| Pat Summitt | Tennessee | 8 |
| Kim Mulkey | Baylor / LSU | 4 (Note: 3 at Baylor, 1 at LSU.) |
| Dawn Staley | South Carolina | 3 |
| Tara VanDerveer | Stanford | 3 |
| Muffet McGraw | Notre Dame | 2 |
| Linda Sharp | Southern California | 2 |

=== NCAA Championship by conference ===
Note: Conferences are listed by all champions' affiliations at that time; these do not necessarily match current affiliations.

| Conference | Year | Championships |
|---|---|---|
| Southeastern | 1987, 1989, 1991, 1996, 1997, 1998, 2007, 2008, 2017, 2022, 2023, 2024 | 12 |
| Big East (Note: The Big East Conference operated in its original form from 1979 until 2013. During that time, UConn won eight championships, and Notre Dame won one. Following the three-way 2013 split of that conference and subsequent settlement between the non-FBS schools and the remaining schools, the conference legally changed its name to the American Athletic Conference (and would change its name again to the current American Conference in 2025). Three schools (among them Notre Dame) left for the Atlantic Coast Conference in 2013, with a fourth doing the same in 2014; one school left for the Big Ten in 2014; and the non-FBS schools retained the Big East name. However, the current Big East now maintains the history of the original conference in all sports that it sponsors, including women's basketball. UConn then moved from the American to the new Big East in all sports outside football in the summer of 2020. The American no longer claims any of the original Big East's competitive history, though legally it does even in the two sports that it sponsored after the split and the current Big East does not (football and women's rowing, the latter of which it no longer sponsors).) | 1995, 2000, 2001, 2002, 2003, 2004, 2009, 2010, 2013, 2025 | 10 |
| Pac-12 (Note: Known as the Pacific-10 Conference, or Pac-10, when its first 4 titles were won.) | 1983, 1984, 1990, 1992, 2021 | 5 |
| Big 12 | 2005, 2011, 2012, 2019 | 4 |
| American (Note: Known as the American Athletic Conference when its titles were won. The conference has used "American" as its preferred short form throughout its post-2013 history.) | 2014, 2015, 2016 | 3 |
| Atlantic Coast | 1994, 2006, 2018 | 3 |
| Big Ten | 1999, 2026 | 2 |
| Southwest | 1986, 1993 | 2 |
| Western Collegiate | 1983, 1984 | 2 |
| American South | 1988 | 1 |
| Independent | 1982 | 1 |
| Sun Belt | 1985 | 1 |

=== NCAA Final Four locations ===
NCAA Final Four locations (hover over city to see arena)
- 1982 – Norfolk, Virginia
- 1983 – Norfolk, Virginia
- 1984 – Los Angeles, California
- 1985 – Austin, Texas
- 1986 – Lexington, Kentucky
- 1987 – Austin, Texas
- 1988 – Tacoma, Washington
- 1989 – Tacoma, Washington
- 1990 – Knoxville, Tennessee
- 1991 – New Orleans, Louisiana
- 1992 – Los Angeles, California
- 1993 – Atlanta, Georgia
- 1994 – Richmond, Virginia
- 1995 – Minneapolis, Minnesota
- 1996 – Charlotte, North Carolina
- 1997 – Cincinnati, Ohio
- 1998 – Kansas City, Missouri
- 1999 – San Jose, California
- 2000 – Philadelphia, Pennsylvania
- 2001 – St. Louis, Missouri
- 2002 – San Antonio, Texas
- 2003 – Atlanta, Georgia
- 2004 – New Orleans, Louisiana
- 2005 – Indianapolis, Indiana
- 2006 – Boston, Massachusetts
- 2007 – Cleveland, Ohio
- 2008 – Tampa, Florida
- 2009 – St. Louis, Missouri
- 2010 – San Antonio, Texas
- 2011 – Indianapolis, Indiana
- 2012 – Denver, Colorado
- 2013 – New Orleans, Louisiana
- 2014 – Nashville, Tennessee
- 2015 – Tampa, Florida
- 2016 – Indianapolis, Indiana
- 2017 – Dallas, Texas
- 2018 – Columbus, Ohio
- 2019 – Tampa, Florida
- ~~2020 – New Orleans, Louisiana~~
- 2021 – San Antonio, Texas
- 2022 – Minneapolis, Minnesota
- 2023 – Dallas, Texas
- 2024 – Cleveland, Ohio
- 2025 – Tampa, Florida
- 2026 – Phoenix, Arizona
- 2027 – Columbus, Ohio
- 2028 – Indianapolis, Indiana
- 2029 – San Antonio, Texas
- 2030 – Portland, Oregon
- 2031 – Dallas, Texas

== Result by school and by year ==
Two hundred and eighty-three teams have appeared in the NCAA tournament in at least one year starting with 1982 (the initial year that the post-season tournament was under the auspices of the NCAA). The results for all years are shown in this table below.

- CH National Champion
- RU National Runner-up
- F4 Final Four
- E8 Elite Eight
- 16 Sweet Sixteen
- 32 Round of 32
- ✖ Round of 64 (Fewer than 64 teams invited before 1994.)
- ƒ First Four (2022–2026), Opening Round (2027–present)
- ~~16~~ ~~32~~ ~~✖~~ The team achieved the placement shown, but the participation was later vacated. These vacated appearances are not included in the total columns.

Programs are listed below under their current athletic branding, which is not necessarily what was used at the time. For example, Missouri State reached two Final Fours while known as "Southwest Missouri State".

For each season, the team's seed is shown in superscript to the left of the result.

| School | Conference | # | 16 | E8 | F4 | CG | CH | 82 | 83 | 84 | 85 | 86 | 87 | 88 | 89 | 90 | 91 | 92 | 93 | 94 | 95 | 96 | 97 | 98 | 99 | 00 | 01 | 02 | 03 | 04 | 05 | 06 | 07 | 08 | 09 | 10 | 11 | 12 | 13 | 14 | 15 | 16 | 17 | 18 | 19 | 21 | 22 | 23 | 24 | 25 | 26 |
|---|---|---|---|---|---|---|---|---|---|---|---|---|---|---|---|---|---|---|---|---|---|---|---|---|---|---|---|---|---|---|---|---|---|---|---|---|---|---|---|---|---|---|---|---|---|---|---|---|---|---|---|
| UConn | Big East | 37 | 33 | 29 | 25 | 13 | 12 | | | | | | | | ⁸✖ | ⁴32 | ³F4 | ⁶32 | ⁶✖ | ¹E8 | ¹CH | ¹F4 | ¹E8 | ²E8 | ¹16 | ¹CH | ¹F4 | ¹CH | ¹CH | ²CH | ³16 | ²E8 | ¹E8 | ¹F4 | ¹CH | ¹CH | ¹F4 | ¹F4 | ¹CH | ¹CH | ¹CH | ¹CH | ¹F4 | ¹F4 | ²F4 | ¹F4 | ²RU | ²16 | ³F4 | ²CH | ¹F4 |
| Tennessee | SEC | 44 | 37 | 28 | 18 | 13 | 8 | ²F4 | ¹E8 | ³RU | ³16 | ⁴F4 | ²CH | ¹F4 | ¹CH | ¹E8 | ¹CH | ¹16 | ¹E8 | ¹16 | ¹RU | ¹CH | ³CH | ¹CH | ¹E8 | ¹RU | ¹16 | ²F4 | ¹RU | ¹RU | ¹F4 | ²E8 | ¹CH | ¹CH | ⁵✖ | ¹16 | ¹E8 | ²E8 | ²E8 | ¹16 | ²E8 | ⁷E8 | ⁵32 | ³32 | ¹¹✖ | ³32 | ⁴16 | ⁴16 | ⁶32 | ⁵16 | ¹⁰✖ |
| Stanford | ACC | 37 | 29 | 22 | 15 | 5 | 3 | ⁷32 | | | | | | ⁵16 | ²E8 | ¹CH | ²F4 | ¹CH | ¹16 | ²E8 | ²F4 | ¹F4 | ¹F4 | ¹✖ | ⁷✖ | ⁹32 | ¹⁰32 | ²16 | ³32 | ⁶E8 | ²E8 | ³E8 | ²32 | ²RU | ²F4 | ¹RU | ¹F4 | ¹F4 | ¹16 | ²F4 | ⁴16 | ⁴E8 | ²F4 | ⁴16 | ²E8 | ¹CH | ¹F4 | ¹32 | ²16 | | |
| South Carolina | SEC | 22 | 16 | 10 | 8 | 5 | 3 | ³16 | | | | ⁷✖ | | ⁸32 | ⁶✖ | ⁵16 | ⁷✖ | | | | | | | | | | | ³E8 | ⁵32 | | | | | | | | | ⁵16 | ⁴32 | ¹16 | ¹F4 | ¹16 | ¹CH | ²E8 | ⁴16 | ¹F4 | ¹CH | ¹F4 | ¹CH | ¹RU | ¹RU |
| Baylor | Big 12 | 24 | 16 | 10 | 4 | 3 | 3 | | | | | | | | | | | | | | | | | | | | ⁸✖ | ²32 | | ⁴16 | ²CH | ³16 | ⁵32 | ³32 | ²16 | ⁴F4 | ¹E8 | ¹CH | ¹16 | ²E8 | ²E8 | ¹E8 | ¹E8 | ²16 | ¹CH | ²E8 | ²32 | ⁷32 | ⁵16 | ⁴32 | ⁶32 |
| Notre Dame | ACC | 31 | 22 | 11 | 9 | 7 | 2 | | | | | | | | | | | ¹²✖ | | ⁷✖ | | ¹²32 | ⁶F4 | ⁹16 | ⁵32 | ²16 | ¹CH | ⁷32 | ¹¹16 | ⁵16 | ⁴32 | ⁹✖ | ⁹32 | ⁵16 | ⁷✖ | ²16 | ²RU | ¹RU | ¹F4 | ¹RU | ¹RU | ¹16 | ¹E8 | ¹CH | ¹RU | | ⁵16 | ³16 | ²16 | ³16 | ⁶E8 |
| Louisiana Tech | Sun Belt | 27 | 20 | 16 | 10 | 6 | 2 | ¹CH | ¹RU | ¹F4 | ¹E8 | ²E8 | ¹RU | ²CH | ¹F4 | ¹F4 | ¹⁰✖ | ⁶✖ | ⁶E8 | ⁴RU | ²16 | ¹E8 | ²16 | ³RU | ¹F4 | ¹E8 | ³E8 | ⁵✖ | ⁵16 | ⁵16 | ¹¹✖ | ¹¹✖ | | | | ¹⁴✖ | ¹⁰✖ | | | | | | | | | | | | | | |
| USC | Big Ten | 20 | 12 | 8 | 3 | 3 | 2 | ¹E8 | ¹CH | ¹CH | ⁴16 | ¹RU | ³16 | ⁴16 | | | ⁵32 | ³E8 | ³16 | ²E8 | ⁹✖ | | ⁶32 | | | | | | | | ⁸32 | ⁸32 | | | | | | | | ⁹✖ | | | | | | | | ⁸✖ | ¹E8 | ¹E8 | ⁹32 |
| Purdue | Big Ten | 27 | 12 | 8 | 3 | 2 | 1 | | | | | | | | ⁵32 | ⁴16 | ²32 | ³16 | | ¹F4 | ⁴E8 | ⁵✖ | ⁸32 | ⁴E8 | ¹CH | ⁴32 | ³RU | ²32 | ²E8 | ²16 | ⁹32 | ⁴16 | ²E8 | ⁹32 | ⁶E8 | | ⁹32 | ⁴32 | ⁴32 | ⁴32 | | ¹¹✖ | ⁹32 | | | | | ¹¹ƒ | | | |
| Old Dominion | Sun Belt | 25 | 12 | 5 | 3 | 2 | 1 | ¹16 | ²F4 | ¹E8 | ¹CH | | ⁵16 | ⁶32 | ⁶32 | ⁸32 | | ¹⁰✖ | ⁷32 | ⁶32 | ⁸✖ | ²16 | ¹RU | ¹16 | ²16 | ⁴16 | ¹¹✖ | ⁷E8 | ¹²✖ | ⁸✖ | ¹¹✖ | ¹⁰✖ | ⁷✖ | ⁵16 | | | | | | | | | | | | | | | | | |
| LSU | SEC | 31 | 18 | 11 | 6 | 1 | 1 | | | ⁵16 | | ²E8 | ⁴32 | ⁹✖ | ⁴16 | ⁹✖ | ²32 | | | | | | ⁴16 | | ⁴16 | ³E8 | ⁶32 | ⁶32 | ¹E8 | ⁴F4 | ¹F4 | ¹F4 | ³F4 | ²F4 | ⁶32 | ⁷32 | | ⁵32 | ⁶16 | ⁷16 | ¹¹✖ | | ⁸✖ | ⁶✖ | | | ³32 | ³CH | ³E8 | ³E8 | ²16 |
| Texas | SEC | 38 | 20 | 14 | 5 | 1 | 1 | | ²E8 | ²E8 | ¹16 | ¹CH | ¹F4 | ¹E8 | ²E8 | ³E8 | ⁷✖ | ⁴32 | ³32 | ⁵32 | | ⁵32 | ³32 | | ¹²✖ | ⁷✖ | ⁸✖ | ⁴16 | ²F4 | ¹16 | ³32 | | | ⁸32 | ⁶✖ | ⁶✖ | ⁹✖ | ⁹✖ | | ⁵32 | ⁵16 | ²E8 | ³16 | ²16 | ⁷✖ | ⁶E8 | ²E8 | ⁴32 | ¹E8 | ¹F4 | ¹F4 |
| Maryland | Big Ten | 33 | 17 | 11 | 5 | 1 | 1 | ²F4 | ³16 | ⁶32 | | ⁶32 | | ²E8 | ¹F4 | ⁶32 | ⁶✖ | ²E8 | ²32 | | | | ⁹✖ | | | | ⁸✖ | | | ¹²32 | ⁷32 | ²CH | ²32 | ¹E8 | ¹E8 | | ⁴32 | ²E8 | ⁴16 | ⁴F4 | ¹F4 | ²32 | ³16 | ⁵32 | ³32 | ²16 | ⁴16 | ²E8 | ¹⁰✖ | ⁴16 | ⁵32 |
| North Carolina | ACC | 33 | 20 | 7 | 3 | 1 | 1 | | ⁷32 | ²16 | ⁶32 | ⁴16 | ⁴32 | | | | | ⁷32 | ⁴16 | ³CH | ³16 | | ¹16 | ²E8 | ⁴16 | ⁵16 | | ⁴16 | ³32 | ⁴✖ | ¹E8 | ¹F4 | ¹F4 | ¹E8 | ³32 | ¹⁰✖ | ⁵16 | | ³32 | ⁴E8 | ⁴16 | | | | ⁹✖ | ¹⁰✖ | ⁵16 | ⁶32 | ⁸32 | ³16 | ⁴16 |
| UCLA | Big Ten | 21 | 11 | 4 | 2 | 1 | 1 | | ⁶32 | | ⁶16 | | | | | ¹⁰✖ | | ⁵16 | | | | | | ⁷32 | ³E8 | ¹⁰✖ | | | | ¹⁰✖ | | ⁵32 | | | | ⁸32 | ³32 | | ³32 | | | ³16 | ⁴16 | ³E8 | ⁶16 | ³32 | | ⁴16 | ²16 | ¹F4 | ¹CH |
| Texas Tech | Big 12 | 21 | 11 | 4 | 1 | 1 | 1 | | | ⁸32 | | ⁶32 | | | | ¹²✖ | ⁹✖ | ⁴16 | ²CH | ²16 | ²E8 | ⁴16 | ⁸32 | ¹32 | ²16 | ³E8 | ²16 | ⁴16 | ²E8 | ⁴32 | ⁴16 | | | | | | ⁸✖ | | ⁷✖ | | | | | | | | | | | | ⁷32 |
| Texas A&M | SEC | 18 | 9 | 3 | 1 | 1 | 1 | | | | | | | | | | | | | ¹³16 | | ⁷✖ | | | | | | | | | | ⁶✖ | ⁴32 | ²E8 | ²16 | ²32 | ²CH | ³16 | ³32 | ³E8 | ⁶✖ | ⁴32 | ⁵32 | ⁴16 | ⁴16 | ²16 | | | ¹¹✖ | | |
| Auburn | SEC | 22 | 10 | 6 | 3 | 3 | - | ⁷32 | ⁵16 | | ³16 | ³16 | ¹E8 | ¹RU | ¹RU | ²RU | ³E8 | | ³16 | ⁹32 | | ⁶E8 | ⁷32 | | ⁵32 | ⁷32 | | | | ⁷32 | | | | ¹¹✖ | ²32 | | | | | | | ⁹32 | ¹¹✖ | | ¹⁰✖ | | | | ¹¹ƒ | | |
| Georgia | SEC | 37 | 20 | 11 | 5 | 2 | - | ⁵32 | ²F4 | ¹E8 | ²RU | ¹16 | ²16 | ⁴16 | ⁵32 | ²32 | ¹E8 | | ⁸32 | | ³F4 | ²RU | ²E8 | ⁷✖ | ³F4 | ¹E8 | ²32 | ¹⁰✖ | ⁵16 | ³E8 | ⁶16 | ³16 | ³16 | ⁸32 | ¹¹✖ | ⁵16 | ⁶16 | ⁴✖ | ⁴E8 | ⁸✖ | | ⁸✖ | | ⁴32 | | ³32 | ⁶32 | ¹⁰32 | | | ⁷✖ |
| Duke | ACC | 28 | 20 | 13 | 4 | 2 | - | | | | | | ⁷32 | | | | | | | | ⁵32 | ⁴32 | ⁵32 | ²E8 | ³RU | ²16 | ¹16 | ¹F4 | ¹F4 | ¹E8 | ²E8 | ¹RU | ¹16 | ³16 | ¹32 | ²E8 | ²E8 | ²E8 | ²E8 | ²32 | ⁴16 | | ²32 | ⁵16 | | | | ³32 | ⁷16 | ²E8 | ³E8 |
| Louisville | ACC | 28 | 13 | 8 | 4 | 2 | - | | ⁷32 | ⁸32 | | | | | | | | | ¹¹32 | | ¹¹32 | | ¹⁰✖ | ¹⁰32 | ¹⁰✖ | | ¹³✖ | | | | ⁹✖ | ⁹✖ | ⁶32 | ⁴16 | ³RU | | ⁷16 | ⁷32 | ⁵RU | ³E8 | ³16 | ³32 | ⁴16 | ¹F4 | ¹E8 | ²E8 | ¹F4 | ⁵E8 | ⁶✖ | ⁷32 | ³16 |
| Iowa | Big Ten | 32 | 10 | 6 | 3 | 2 | - | | | | | ⁵32 | ³E8 | ¹E8 | ³16 | ³32 | ⁶32 | ¹32 | ²F4 | ³32 | | ²16 | ⁹32 | ⁴32 | | | ⁴32 | ⁹32 | | ⁹✖ | | ¹⁰✖ | | ⁹✖ | ⁸✖ | ⁸32 | ⁶✖ | ⁹✖ | ⁹32 | ⁶32 | ³16 | | | ⁶✖ | ²E8 | ⁵16 | ²32 | ²RU | ¹RU | ⁶32 | ²32 |
| Mississippi State | SEC | 13 | 5 | 3 | 2 | 2 | - | | | | | | | | | | | | | | | | | | ⁷✖ | ³32 | | ¹²32 | ³32 | | | | | | ¹¹32 | ⁷16 | | | | | ⁵32 | ⁵16 | ²RU | ¹RU | ¹E8 | | | ¹¹32 | | ⁹32 | |
| Virginia | ACC | 26 | 13 | 7 | 3 | 1 | - | | | ⁵32 | ⁶32 | ¹32 | ³16 | ²E8 | ⁴16 | ²F4 | ¹RU | ¹F4 | ²E8 | ³16 | ³E8 | ³E8 | ⁴16 | ⁶32 | ⁹✖ | ⁴16 | ⁹✖ | ⁸✖ | ⁸32 | | ⁶32 | | | ⁴32 | ⁵32 | ⁵✖ | | | | | | | | ¹⁰32 | | | | | | | ¹⁰16 |
| Oklahoma | SEC | 26 | 12 | 3 | 3 | 1 | - | | | | | ⁴16 | | | | | | | | | ⁷32 | | | | | ⁵16 | ²16 | ¹RU | ¹⁰✖ | ³32 | ⁸✖ | ²16 | ³16 | ⁴32 | ¹F4 | ³F4 | ⁶16 | ⁶32 | ⁶16 | ¹⁰✖ | ⁵32 | ⁶32 | ⁶32 | ¹²✖ | | | ⁴32 | ⁵32 | ⁵32 | ³16 | ⁴16 |
| Western Kentucky | CUSA | 20 | 6 | 3 | 3 | 1 | - | | | | ⁴F4 | ⁴F4 | ⁶32 | ⁵32 | ⁵✖ | ⁹✖ | ⁴16 | ⁴RU | ⁴16 | ¹²32 | ⁴16 | | ¹⁰✖ | ⁸32 | | ¹⁰32 | | | ¹³✖ | | | | | ¹⁰✖ | | | | | | ¹⁵✖ | ¹²✖ | | ¹²✖ | ¹¹✖ | | | | | | | |
| Rutgers | Big Ten | 26 | 11 | 7 | 2 | 1 | - | | | | | ²E8 | ²E8 | ³16 | ⁷32 | ¹¹✖ | ⁶✖ | ⁸32 | ⁹32 | ⁵✖ | | | | ⁵16 | ³E8 | ²F4 | ⁴32 | | ⁴32 | ⁷✖ | ³E8 | ³16 | ⁴RU | ²E8 | ⁷16 | ⁹✖ | ⁷32 | ⁶✖ | | | ⁸32 | | | | ⁷✖ | ⁶✖ | | | | | |
| Cheyney | D2 | 3 | 3 | 2 | 2 | 1 | - | ²RU | ¹16 | ³F4 | | | | | | | | | | | | | | | | | | | | | | | | | | | | | | | | | | | | | | | | | |
| Ohio State | | | ⁶16 | ³E8 | ²32 | ⁴32 | ³32 | | | | | | | | | | | | | | | | | | | | | | | | | | | | | | | | | | | | | | | | | | | | |
| Michigan State | Big Ten | 21 | 3 | 1 | 1 | 1 | - | | | | | | | | | | ⁴32 | | | | | ⁹32 | ⁸32 | | | | | | ⁸✖ | ⁸32 | ¹RU | ⁴16 | ⁵32 | | ⁹16 | ⁵32 | ⁴32 | ¹⁰✖ | ⁵32 | ⁵32 | | ⁴32 | ⁹✖ | | ⁹32 | ¹⁰✖ | | | ⁹✖ | ⁷32 | ⁵32 |
| Arizona | Big 12 | 11 | 2 | 1 | 1 | 1 | - | | | | | | | | | | | | | | | | ⁷32 | ³16 | ⁶32 | ⁸32 | | | ⁶✖ | ⁹✖ | ⁹32 | | | | | | | | | | | | | | | ³RU | ⁴32 | ⁷32 | ¹¹✖ | | |
| Syracuse | ACC | 14 | 1 | 1 | 1 | 1 | - | | | | ⁸32 | | | ⁶32 | | | | | | | | | | | | | | ¹⁰✖ | | | | | | ⁷✖ | | | | | ⁷✖ | ⁶32 | ⁸32 | ⁴RU | ⁸32 | ⁸✖ | ³32 | ⁸32 | | | ⁶32 | | ⁹32 |
| Long Beach State | Big West | 12 | 9 | 6 | 2 | - | - | ¹16 | ²E8 | ²E8 | ¹E8 | ³16 | ¹F4 | ²F4 | ²E8 | ⁶32 | ⁴16 | ¹⁰✖ | | | | | | | | | | | | | | | | | | | | | | | | | ¹⁵✖ | | | | | | | | |
| NC State | ACC | 31 | 17 | 3 | 2 | - | - | ³16 | ⁴32 | ⁴16 | ⁴16 | ⁶32 | ³16 | | ²16 | ²16 | ²16 | | | | ⁷16 | ⁵32 | ⁸✖ | ⁴F4 | ¹⁰32 | ⁵✖ | ⁴16 | | | ¹⁰✖ | ⁵✖ | ⁵✖ | ⁴16 | | | ⁹✖ | | | | ⁵✖ | | | ⁶32 | ⁴16 | ³16 | ¹16 | ¹E8 | ⁷✖ | ³F4 | ²16 | ⁷32 |
| Missouri State | CUSA | 18 | 5 | 2 | 2 | - | - | | | | | | | | | | ⁸32 | ⁸F4 | ⁷16 | ⁶32 | ⁹32 | ¹²✖ | | ⁸✖ | ⁷32 | ¹⁰✖ | ⁵F4 | | ¹⁵✖ | ¹²✖ | | ¹³✖ | | | | | | | | | | ¹³✖ | | | ¹¹16 | ⁵16 | ¹¹✖ | | | | ¹⁶✖ |
| Vanderbilt | SEC | 30 | 15 | 5 | 1 | - | - | | | | | ⁵32 | ⁵32 | | ⁷✖ | ⁶16 | ¹⁰16 | ³E8 | ¹F4 | ²16 | ¹16 | ³E8 | ⁶16 | ⁶✖ | | ⁹32 | ³E8 | ¹E8 | ⁴32 | ²16 | ⁵16 | ⁸32 | ²32 | ⁴16 | ⁴16 | ⁶32 | ¹⁰✖ | ⁷32 | ⁸32 | ⁸✖ | | | | | | | | | ¹²✖ | ⁷✖ | ²16 |
| Penn State | Big Ten | 25 | 13 | 4 | 1 | - | - | ⁴16 | ⁵E8 | ⁸32 | ³16 | ³16 | ⁵32 | ⁹32 | | ⁷32 | ¹32 | ³16 | ³32 | ¹E8 | ²32 | ²16 | | | ⁸32 | ²F4 | ⁶✖ | ⁴16 | ⁴16 | ¹E8 | ⁴✖ | | | | | | ⁶32 | ⁴16 | ³32 | ³16 | | | | | | | | | | | |
| Washington | Big Ten | 21 | 7 | 3 | 1 | - | - | | | | ³32 | ⁷32 | ⁸32 | ³16 | ⁵32 | ¹E8 | ³16 | | ⁷32 | ⁸32 | ³16 | | ¹¹✖ | ¹³✖ | | | ⁶E8 | | ⁹✖ | | | ⁹32 | ¹¹✖ | | | | | | | | ⁶✖ | ⁷F4 | ³16 | | | | | | | ¹¹ƒ | ⁶32 |
| Oregon State | Pac-12 | 14 | 6 | 3 | 1 | - | - | | ³16 | ⁵32 | | | | | | | | | | ¹¹✖ | ⁵32 | ⁶✖ | | | | | | | | | | | | | | | | | | ⁹32 | ³32 | ²F4 | ²16 | ⁶E8 | ⁴16 | ⁸32 | | | ³E8 | ¹⁴✖ | |
| Oregon | Big Ten | 19 | 4 | 3 | 1 | - | - | ³32 | | ³32 | | | ¹⁰32 | | | | | | | ⁶32 | ⁶✖ | ¹¹✖ | ⁶32 | ¹²✖ | ⁵32 | ⁶✖ | ¹³✖ | | | | ¹⁰32 | | | | | | | | | | | | ¹⁰E8 | ²E8 | ²F4 | ⁶16 | ⁵✖ | | | ¹⁰32 | ⁸32 |
| Arkansas | SEC | 13 | 3 | 2 | 1 | - | - | | | | | ⁸✖ | | | ¹²✖ | ⁷E8 | ³16 | | | | ⁶32 | | | ⁹F4 | | | ⁹32 | ⁶32 | ⁷32 | | | | | | | | | ⁶32 | | | ¹⁰32 | | | | | ⁴✖ | ¹⁰✖ | | | | |
| Alabama | SEC | 15 | 6 | 1 | 1 | - | - | | | ²16 | | | | ⁹✖ | | | | ⁵32 | ⁵32 | ⁶F4 | ⁴16 | ⁴16 | ²16 | ²16 | ⁵32 | | | | | | | | | | | | | | | | | | | | | ⁷32 | | ¹⁰✖ | ⁸32 | ⁵32 | ⁶32 |
| Minnesota | Big Ten | 11 | 4 | 1 | 1 | - | - | | | | | | | | | | | | | ¹⁰32 | | | | | | | | ⁵32 | ⁶16 | ⁷F4 | ³16 | ⁸✖ | | ⁹✖ | ¹⁰32 | | | | | | ⁸✖ | | | ¹⁰32 | | | | | | | ⁴16 |
| California | ACC | 15 | 2 | 1 | 1 | - | - | | | | | | | | | ¹¹✖ | | ⁵✖ | ⁹32 | | | | | | | | | | | | | ¹⁰✖ | ⁸✖ | ³32 | ⁴16 | | | ⁸32 | ²F4 | ⁷32 | ⁴32 | | ⁹32 | ⁷✖ | ⁸32 | | | | | ⁸✖ | |
| Virginia Tech | ACC | 14 | 2 | 1 | 1 | - | - | | | | | | | | | | | | | ⁸✖ | ⁸32 | | | ¹¹32 | ⁴16 | | ⁷32 | | ⁷32 | ⁸32 | ¹²✖ | ⁷32 | | | | | | | | | | | | | | ⁷32 | ⁵✖ | ¹F4 | ⁴32 | | ⁹✖ |
| Louisiana–Monroe | Sun Belt | 4 | 2 | 1 | 1 | - | - | | ⁸32 | ⁶16 | ²F4 | | ¹⁰✖ | | | | | | | | | | | | | | | | | | | | | | | | | | | | | | | | | | | | | | |
| Ole Miss | SEC | 22 | 12 | 5 | - | - | - | ⁶32 | ⁴16 | ⁴16 | ²E8 | ²E8 | ⁴16 | ³16 | ³E8 | ⁵16 | ⁹✖ | ²E8 | | ⁵32 | ¹²✖ | ⁷✖ | | | | | | | | ¹⁰✖ | ⁸✖ | | ⁷E8 | | | | | | | | | | | | | | ⁷✖ | ⁸16 | ⁷32 | ⁵16 | ⁵32 |
| Kentucky | SEC | 19 | 7 | 4 | - | - | - | ²E8 | ³32 | | | ⁷✖ | | | | | ⁹✖ | | | | | | | | ⁶32 | | | | | | | ⁵32 | | | | ⁴E8 | ⁴32 | ²E8 | ²E8 | ³16 | ²32 | ³16 | ⁴32 | | ⁶32 | ⁴32 | ⁶✖ | | | ⁴32 | ⁵16 |
| Colorado | Big 12 | 17 | 8 | 3 | - | - | - | | | | | | | ⁷32 | ³32 | | | ⁷✖ | ⁴E8 | ³16 | ¹E8 | ³32 | ²16 | | | | ⁶32 | ³E8 | ⁶16 | ⁶✖ | | | | | | | | | ⁵✖ | | | | | | | | ⁷✖ | ⁶16 | ⁵16 | | ¹⁰✖ |
| Florida State | ACC | 23 | 5 | 3 | - | - | - | | ⁵32 | | | | | | | ¹⁰✖ | ⁵32 | | | | | | | | | | ⁷32 | | | | ⁶32 | ⁶32 | ¹⁰16 | ¹¹32 | ³32 | ³E8 | ³32 | | ⁸32 | ¹⁰32 | ²E8 | ⁵16 | ³E8 | ³32 | ⁵32 | ⁹✖ | ¹¹ƒ | ⁷✖ | ⁹✖ | ⁶32 | |
| Arizona State | Big 12 | 18 | 7 | 2 | - | - | - | ⁴16 | ⁴16 | | | | | | | | | ⁶✖ | | | | | | | | | ¹¹✖ | ⁹32 | | | ⁵16 | ⁴32 | ³E8 | ⁶32 | ⁶E8 | | ⁷✖ | | | ⁹32 | ³16 | ²32 | ⁸32 | ⁷32 | ⁵16 | | | | | | ¹⁰ƒ |
| Iowa State | Big 12 | 24 | 6 | 2 | - | - | - | | | | | | | | | | | | | | | | ¹²✖ | ⁴32 | ⁴E8 | ³16 | ²16 | ³32 | | | ⁷✖ | | ⁶32 | ⁷32 | ⁴E8 | ⁴16 | ⁷✖ | ¹⁰✖ | ⁵32 | ⁷✖ | ¹⁰✖ | | ⁹✖ | | ³32 | ⁷32 | ³16 | ⁵✖ | ⁷32 | ¹¹✖ | ⁸✖ |
| Michigan | Big Ten | 14 | 3 | 2 | - | - | - | | | | | | | | | ¹⁰32 | | | | | | | | ¹⁰✖ | | ⁸✖ | ⁸32 | | | | | | | | | | | ¹¹✖ | ⁸32 | | | | | ⁷32 | ⁸32 | ⁶16 | ³E8 | ⁶32 | ⁹✖ | ⁶32 | ²E8 |
| TCU | Big 12 | 11 | 2 | 2 | - | - | - | | | | | | | | | | | | | | | | | | | | ¹¹32 | ⁸32 | ⁹32 | ⁶32 | ⁷✖ | ¹¹32 | ¹⁰✖ | | ¹⁰✖ | ⁹✖ | | | | | | | | | | | | | | ²E8 | ³E8 |
| Xavier | Big East | 10 | 2 | 2 | - | - | - | | | | | | | | | | | | ¹²✖ | | | | | | ⁸32 | ⁶✖ | ⁴E8 | | ¹⁰✖ | | | | ⁶✖ | ⁹✖ | ⁵✖ | ³E8 | ²32 | | | | | | | | | | | | | | |
| Gonzaga | Pac-12 | 16 | 5 | 1 | - | - | - | | | | | | | | | | | | | | | | | | | | | | | | | | ¹²✖ | | ¹²32 | ⁷16 | ¹¹E8 | ¹¹16 | ¹²✖ | ⁶✖ | ¹¹16 | | ¹¹✖ | ¹³✖ | ⁵32 | ⁵✖ | ⁹32 | ⁹✖ | ⁴16 | | ¹²✖ |
| Kansas State | Big 12 | 19 | 4 | 1 | - | - | - | ⁴E8 | ³16 | ³32 | | | ⁹✖ | | | | | | | | | | ¹⁰✖ | | | | | ³16 | ³32 | ²32 | ⁴32 | | | ⁵32 | ⁵32 | | ⁸✖ | ⁸32 | | | | ⁹32 | ⁷32 | | ⁹✖ | | ⁹32 | | ⁴32 | ⁵16 | |
| George Washington | Atlantic 10 | 18 | 4 | 1 | - | - | - | | | | | | | | | | ¹⁰32 | ⁸32 | | ⁷32 | ⁴16 | ⁶32 | ⁵E8 | ¹⁰32 | | ⁷32 | ⁷✖ | | ⁷32 | ⁸✖ | ⁹32 | ⁷32 | ⁵16 | ⁶16 | | | | | | | ⁶✖ | ⁸✖ | | ¹⁴✖ | | | | | | | |
| Clemson | ACC | 17 | 4 | 1 | - | - | - | ⁵32 | | | | | | ⁵32 | ⁴16 | ⁵16 | ⁴E8 | ⁵32 | ⁵32 | ⁹32 | | ³32 | ⁵✖ | ⁶32 | ²16 | ⁹32 | ⁵32 | ¹¹✖ | | | | | | | | | | | | | | | | | ⁹32 | | | | | | ⁸✖ |
| Indiana | Big Ten | 11 | 4 | 1 | - | - | - | | ⁶16 | | | | | | | | | | | ¹²✖ | ¹⁴✖ | | | | | | | ⁹✖ | | | | | | | | | | | | | | ⁹32 | | | ¹⁰32 | ⁴E8 | ³16 | ¹32 | ⁴16 | ⁹32 | |
| Utah | Big 12 | 21 | 3 | 1 | - | - | - | | ⁵32 | | | ⁹✖ | | | ¹¹✖ | ¹²✖ | ¹²✖ | | | | ⁸✖ | ⁸✖ | ⁵32 | ⁷✖ | | ¹¹✖ | ⁵16 | | ⁸32 | | ¹⁰32 | ⁵E8 | | ⁸✖ | ⁹32 | | ¹⁵✖ | | | | | | | | | | ⁷32 | ²16 | ⁵32 | ⁸✖ | |
| Miami (FL) | ACC | 16 | 2 | 1 | - | - | - | | | | | | | | ⁸✖ | | | ²16 | ⁵32 | | | | | ¹¹✖ | | | | | ¹¹✖ | ⁵✖ | | | | | | | ³32 | ³32 | ⁸✖ | | ¹¹32 | ⁵✖ | ⁴32 | ⁸✖ | ⁴32 | | ⁸32 | ⁹E8 | | | |
| Florida | SEC | 16 | 2 | 1 | - | - | - | | | | | | | | | | | | ¹⁰32 | ⁴✖ | ⁶32 | ⁵✖ | ³E8 | ³16 | ¹¹✖ | | ³32 | ⁶✖ | | ⁵32 | | ⁶✖ | | | ⁸32 | | | ⁹32 | | ¹¹32 | | ⁵✖ | | | | | ¹⁰✖ | | | | |
| Drake | Missouri Valley | 15 | 2 | 1 | - | - | - | ⁴E8 | | ⁷32 | | ¹⁰32 | | | | | | | | | ⁵32 | | ¹³✖ | ⁵✖ | | ⁸✖ | ¹²✖ | ⁷16 | | | | | ¹⁶✖ | | | | | | | | | | ¹⁰✖ | ¹³✖ | ¹⁰✖ | | | ¹²✖ | ¹²✖ | | |
| Villanova | Big East | 14 | 2 | 1 | - | - | - | | | | | ⁷32 | ⁶32 | ⁸✖ | ¹¹✖ | | | | | | | | | | | | ⁵32 | ⁹32 | ²E8 | ⁷32 | | | | | ⁸✖ | | | | ⁹✖ | | | | | ⁹32 | | | ¹¹32 | ⁴16 | | | ¹⁰✖ |
| Creighton | Big East | 11 | 1 | 1 | - | - | - | | | | | | | | | | | ⁷32 | | ¹⁰32 | | | | | | | | ¹²✖ | | | | | | | | | | ¹⁴✖ | ¹⁰32 | | | | ⁷32 | ¹¹32 | | | ¹⁰E8 | ⁶✖ | ⁷32 | ⁹✖ | |
| Dayton | Atlantic 10 | 9 | 1 | 1 | - | - | - | | | | | | | | | | | | | | | | | | | | | | | | | | | | | ⁸32 | ¹¹✖ | ¹¹✖ | ⁷32 | ⁶✖ | ⁷E8 | | ¹²✖ | ⁹✖ | | | ¹¹✖ | | | | |
| Lamar | Southland | 2 | 1 | 1 | - | - | - | | | | | | | | | | ¹⁰E8 | | | | | | | | | | | | | | | | | | | ¹⁴✖ | | | | | | | | | | | | | | | |
| Stephen F. Austin | Southland | 22 | 5 | - | - | - | - | ⁵32 | ⁷32 | | | | | ⁸32 | ⁴16 | ³16 | ⁸32 | ²16 | ⁴16 | ⁸✖ | ¹¹✖ | ¹¹16 | ⁷32 | ⁹✖ | ¹⁵✖ | ¹¹32 | ¹³✖ | ¹³✖ | | | | ¹³✖ | | | | | | | | | | | | | | ¹²✖ | ¹²✖ | | | ¹⁴✖ | ¹⁶ƒ |
| DePaul | Big East | 25 | 4 | - | - | - | - | | | | | | | | | ⁸32 | ¹²✖ | ¹¹32 | ¹¹✖ | | ¹³✖ | ⁷32 | ¹²✖ | | | | | | ⁹✖ | ⁹32 | ⁵32 | ⁴16 | ¹⁰✖ | ¹⁰✖ | ⁷✖ | ¹¹✖ | ³16 | ⁷32 | ¹⁰✖ | ⁷16 | ⁹32 | ⁶16 | ⁷32 | ⁵32 | ⁶✖ | | ¹¹ƒ | | | | |
| Kansas | Big 12 | 15 | 4 | - | - | - | - | | | | | | ⁷32 | ⁷32 | | | | ⁹✖ | ⁸✖ | ⁹32 | ⁷✖ | ⁴16 | ³32 | ⁵16 | ⁹32 | ⁸✖ | | | | | | | | | | | | ¹¹16 | ¹²16 | | | | | | | | ⁸32 | | ⁸32 | | |
| James Madison | Sun Belt | 14 | 4 | - | - | - | - | | | | | ⁸16 | ⁴16 | ⁴16 | ⁶32 | | ⁸16 | | | | | ¹³✖ | | | | | | | | | | | ⁹✖ | | | ⁹✖ | ¹¹✖ | | | ¹¹32 | ¹²✖ | ¹¹✖ | | | | | | ¹⁴✖ | | | ¹²✖ |
| Oklahoma State | Big 12 | 19 | 3 | - | - | - | - | | | | | | | | ⁹32 | ⁷✖ | ⁵16 | | ¹⁰✖ | ¹²✖ | ¹²✖ | ⁷32 | | | | | | | | | | | ¹⁰✖ | ³16 | | ⁴32 | | | ⁷32 | ⁵16 | ¹⁰✖ | ⁷✖ | | ⁹32 | | ⁸32 | | ⁸✖ | | ⁷✖ | ⁸32 |
| San Diego State | Pac-12 | 10 | 3 | - | - | - | - | | | ⁶16 | ⁵16 | | | | | | | | ⁹✖ | ⁵32 | ⁵✖ | | ¹¹✖ | | | | | | | | | | | | ¹⁰32 | ¹¹16 | | ¹²✖ | | | | | | | | | | | | ¹⁴✖ | |
| Boston College | ACC | 7 | 3 | - | - | - | - | | | | | | | | | | | | | | | | | | ⁸32 | ⁵32 | | ⁵✖ | ⁵16 | ³16 | ⁷32 | ⁸16 | | | | | | | | | | | | | | | | | | | |
| Nebraska | Big Ten | 18 | 2 | - | - | - | - | | | | | | | ⁵32 | | | | | ⁶32 | | | ⁹✖ | | ⁹32 | ¹¹✖ | ¹²✖ | | | | | | | ⁹✖ | ⁸32 | | ¹16 | | ⁶✖ | ⁶16 | ⁴32 | ⁹✖ | | | ¹⁰✖ | | | ⁸✖ | | ⁶32 | ¹⁰✖ | ¹¹✖ |
| BYU | Big 12 | 15 | 2 | - | - | - | - | | | ⁸32 | ⁸32 | | | | | | | | ¹²✖ | | | | | | | ¹²✖ | | ¹¹16 | ¹¹✖ | | | ⁷32 | ¹¹✖ | | | | | ¹⁰✖ | | ¹²16 | ¹⁴✖ | ⁷✖ | | | ⁷32 | ¹¹32 | ⁶✖ | | | | |
| Missouri | SEC | 13 | 2 | - | - | - | - | ⁶16 | ⁴32 | ⁴32 | ⁷32 | ⁹32 | | | | | | | | ¹⁵✖ | | | | | | | ¹⁰16 | | | ¹¹✖ | | ¹⁰✖ | | | | | | | | | | ¹⁰32 | ⁶32 | ⁵✖ | ⁷32 | | | | | | |
| Georgia Tech | ACC | 12 | 2 | - | - | - | - | | | | | | | | | | | | ⁹✖ | | | | | | | | | | ¹⁰✖ | | | | ⁷32 | ¹⁰✖ | ⁹32 | ⁶✖ | ⁵32 | ⁴16 | | ¹⁰✖ | | | | | | ⁵16 | ⁹✖ | | | ⁹✖ | |
| Illinois | Big Ten | 11 | 2 | - | - | - | - | ⁷32 | | | | ⁸32 | ⁸32 | | | | | | | | | | ⁴16 | ³16 | ⁷32 | ⁶32 | | | ⁹✖ | | | | | | | | | | | | | | | | | | | ¹¹ƒ | | ⁸32 | ⁷32 |
| Georgetown | Big East | 4 | 2 | - | - | - | - | | | | | | | | | | | | ⁶16 | | | | | | | | | | | | | | | | | ⁵32 | ⁵16 | ⁵32 | | | | | | | | | | | | | |
| Pittsburgh | ACC | 4 | 2 | - | - | - | - | | | | | | | | | | | | | | | | | | | | | | | | | | ⁸32 | ⁶16 | ⁴16 | | | | | | ¹⁰32 | | | | | | | | | | |
| Montana | Big Sky | 21 | 1 | - | - | - | - | | ⁸✖ | ⁴16 | | ⁸32 | | ⁴32 | ¹⁰32 | ⁸✖ | ¹¹✖ | ¹¹32 | | ⁷32 | ¹²32 | ¹²✖ | ⁹✖ | ¹⁴✖ | | ¹⁶✖ | | | | ¹²✖ | ¹²✖ | | | ¹³✖ | ¹³✖ | | ¹⁴✖ | | ¹³✖ | | ¹⁶✖ | | | | | | | | | | |
| Green Bay | Horizon | 21 | 1 | - | - | - | - | | | | | | | | | | | | | ¹⁵✖ | | | | ¹⁴✖ | ¹⁴✖ | ¹³✖ | | ¹³✖ | ⁸32 | ¹⁴✖ | ¹⁰✖ | | ⁹32 | | ¹¹✖ | ¹²32 | ⁵16 | ⁷32 | ¹¹✖ | | ⁹✖ | ¹⁰✖ | ⁸✖ | ⁷✖ | | | | | ¹¹✖ | ¹²✖ | ¹³✖ |
| Liberty | CUSA | 18 | 1 | - | - | - | - | | | | | | | | | | | | | | | | ¹⁶✖ | ¹⁶✖ | ¹⁴✖ | ¹⁴✖ | ¹⁵✖ | ¹⁴✖ | ¹³✖ | ¹⁴✖ | ¹³16 | ¹³✖ | | ¹²✖ | ¹⁴✖ | ¹³✖ | | ¹⁶✖ | ¹³✖ | | ¹³✖ | | | ¹⁴✖ | | | | | | ¹³✖ | |
| West Virginia | Big 12 | 17 | 1 | - | - | - | - | | | | | | | | ¹²32 | | | ⁴16 | | | | | | | | | | | | ¹¹✖ | | | ¹¹32 | ⁵32 | | ³32 | ⁹32 | ⁸32 | ¹¹✖ | ²32 | | ⁶32 | ⁶32 | | | ⁴32 | | ¹⁰✖ | ⁸32 | ⁶32 | ⁴32 |
| UC Santa Barbara | Big West | 14 | 1 | - | - | - | - | | | | | | | | | | | ⁹32 | ⁵32 | | | | ¹³✖ | ¹¹32 | ¹⁰✖ | ⁴✖ | ¹⁴✖ | ¹²32 | ⁷32 | ¹¹16 | ¹³✖ | | | ¹³✖ | ¹⁵✖ | | | ¹⁶✖ | | | | | | | | | | | | | |
| South Dakota State | Summit | 14 | 1 | - | - | - | - | | | | | | | | | | | | | | | | | | | | | | | | | | | | ⁷32 | ¹⁴✖ | ¹⁵✖ | ¹³✖ | ¹³✖ | | ¹⁴✖ | ¹²32 | | ⁸✖ | ⁶16 | ⁹✖ | | ⁹32 | ¹²✖ | ¹⁰32 | ¹¹✖ |
| St. John's | Big East | 11 | 1 | - | - | - | - | | ⁷32 | ⁷32 | | | | ⁷32 | | | | | | | | | | | | | | | | | | ⁷32 | | | | ⁶32 | ⁹32 | ³16 | ¹⁰✖ | ⁸32 | | ⁸✖ | | | | | | ¹¹✖ | | | |
| UNLV | Mountain West | 11 | 1 | - | - | - | - | | | ⁷32 | ⁴32 | ⁵32 | | | ⁶16 | ⁴32 | ⁸32 | | | ¹⁰✖ | | | | | | | | ¹²✖ | | | | | | | | | | | | | | | | | | | ¹³✖ | ¹¹✖ | ¹⁰✖ | | |
| Bowling Green | MAC | 11 | 1 | - | - | - | - | | | | | | ⁹✖ | ¹⁰✖ | ⁹32 | ¹²✖ | | | ⁷✖ | ⁷✖ | | | | | | | | | | | ¹³✖ | ¹²✖ | ⁷16 | | | ¹²✖ | ¹²✖ | | | | | | | | | | | | | | |
| Marist | Metro | 11 | 1 | - | - | - | - | | | | | | | | | | | | | | | | | | | | | | | ¹⁴✖ | | ¹⁴✖ | ¹³16 | ⁷32 | ¹²✖ | ¹²✖ | ¹⁰32 | ¹³32 | ¹²✖ | ¹¹✖ | | | | | | ¹⁵✖ | | | | | |
| Southern Miss | Sun Belt | 8 | 1 | - | - | - | - | | | | ⁷32 | | ¹⁰✖ | | ¹⁰✖ | ⁸32 | | ⁹✖ | | ⁴16 | ⁷✖ | ⁹32 | | | | | | | | | | | | | | | | | | | | | | | | | | | | | |
| New Mexico | Mountain West | 8 | 1 | - | - | - | - | | | | | | | | | | | | | | | | | ⁸✖ | | | | ¹⁰✖ | ⁶16 | ¹²✖ | ⁸✖ | ¹¹32 | ⁸✖ | ¹²✖ | | | | | | | | | | | | | | | | | |
| Colorado State | Pac-12 | 7 | 1 | - | - | - | - | | | | | | | | | | | | | | | ⁸32 | | ¹²32 | ²16 | | ⁹32 | ⁷✖ | | | | | | | | | | | | | | ¹¹✖ | | | | | | | | | ¹²✖ |
| Memphis | | ⁶32 | | | | | | | | ⁸32 | ⁸✖ | ¹¹✖ | ⁵✖ | | | | | | | | | | | | | | | | | | | | | | | | | | | | | | | | | | | | | | |
| Central Michigan | MAC | 6 | 1 | - | - | - | - | | ⁶32 | ⁷32 | | | | | | | | | | | | | | | | | | | | | | | | | | | | | ¹¹✖ | | | | | ¹¹16 | ⁸✖ | ¹²✖ | | | | | |
| Providence | Big East | 5 | 1 | - | - | - | - | | | | | ⁹✖ | | | ¹¹✖ | ³16 | ⁵32 | ⁷✖ | | | | | | | | | | | | | | | | | | | | | | | | | | | | | | | | | |
| Delaware | CUSA | 5 | 1 | - | - | - | - | | | | | | | | | | | | | | | | | | | | ¹³✖ | | | | | | ¹²✖ | | | | | ³32 | ⁶16 | | | | | | | | ¹³✖ | | | | |
| Quinnipiac | Metro | 5 | 1 | - | - | - | - | | | | | | | | | | | | | | | | | | | | | | | | | | | | | | | | ¹³✖ | | ¹²✖ | | ¹²16 | ⁹32 | ¹¹✖ | | | | | | |
| Southern Illinois | Missouri Valley | 4 | 1 | - | - | - | - | | | | | ⁶32 | ⁵16 | | | ¹¹✖ | | ¹⁰32 | | | | | | | | | | | | | | | | | | | | | | | | | | | | | | | | | |
| Seton Hall | Big East | 4 | 1 | - | - | - | - | | | | | | | | | | | | | ⁴16 | ⁶32 | | | | | | | | | | | | | | | | | | | | ⁹✖ | ⁸✖ | | | | | | | | | |
| San Francisco | West Coast | 4 | 1 | - | - | - | - | | | | | | | | | | | | | | ¹¹✖ | ¹²16 | ¹¹✖ | | | | | | | | | | | | | | | | | | | ¹³✖ | | | | | | | | | |
| South Dakota | Summit | 4 | 1 | - | - | - | - | | | | | | | | | | | | | | | | | | | | | | | | | | | | | | | | | ¹⁵✖ | | | | | ⁸✖ | ¹¹✖ | ¹⁰16 | | | | |
| Buffalo | MAC | 4 | 1 | - | - | - | - | | | | | | | | | | | | | | | | | | | | | | | | | | | | | | | | | | | ¹⁴✖ | | ¹¹16 | ¹⁰32 | | ¹³✖ | | | | |
| UAB | American | 2 | 1 | - | - | - | - | | | | | | | | | | | | | ¹⁰✖ | | | | | | ¹¹16 | | | | | | | | | | | | | | | | | | | | | | | | | |
| St. Bonaventure | Atlantic 10 | 2 | 1 | - | - | - | - | | | | | | | | | | | | | | | | | | | | | | | | | | | | | | | ⁵16 | | | | ¹⁰32 | | | | | | | | | |
| Middle Tennessee | CUSA | 21 | - | - | - | - | - | | ⁸32 | ⁶32 | ⁵32 | ¹⁰32 | | ¹⁰✖ | | | | | | | | ¹³✖ | | ¹⁵✖ | | | | | | ¹³32 | ¹²32 | ¹²✖ | ⁵32 | | ⁸✖ | ¹⁰✖ | ¹¹✖ | ¹⁰✖ | ¹²✖ | ⁸✖ | | ¹²✖ | | | | ¹⁴✖ | | ¹¹✖ | ¹¹32 | | |
| Chattanooga | SoCon | 17 | - | - | - | - | - | | | | | | | | ¹²✖ | | | ¹²✖ | | | | | | | | | ¹²✖ | ¹³✖ | ¹²✖ | ¹⁰32 | | ¹²✖ | ¹²✖ | ¹²✖ | | ¹³✖ | | | ¹¹✖ | ¹¹✖ | ⁷✖ | ¹²✖ | ¹³✖ | | | | | ¹⁶✖ | ¹⁴✖ | | |
| Holy Cross | Patriot | 15 | - | - | - | - | - | | | | ⁷32 | | | | ⁹✖ | | ¹¹32 | | | | ¹⁶✖ | ¹⁵✖ | | ¹⁴✖ | ¹⁴✖ | ¹⁵✖ | ¹⁴✖ | | ¹³✖ | | ¹⁵✖ | | ¹⁶✖ | | | | | | | | | | | | | | | ¹⁵✖ | ¹⁶✖ | | ¹⁵✖ |
| Marquette | Big East | 15 | - | - | - | - | - | | | | | | | | | | | | | ¹⁴✖ | ¹⁰✖ | | ¹²32 | ¹⁰✖ | ⁸✖ | ⁷✖ | | | | ⁹32 | | | ⁶32 | | | | ⁸32 | | | | | | ⁵✖ | ⁸32 | ⁵32 | ¹⁰✖ | | ⁹✖ | ¹⁰✖ | | |
| Saint Joseph's | Atlantic 10 | 13 | - | - | - | - | - | | | | ⁵32 | ⁵32 | ⁹32 | ⁷32 | ¹⁰32 | ⁹✖ | | | | ¹¹✖ | ⁹✖ | | ⁷32 | | ¹¹32 | ¹⁰32 | | | | | | | | | | | | | ⁹✖ | ⁹32 | | | | | | | | | | | |
| Princeton | Ivy League | 13 | - | - | - | - | - | | | | | | | | | | | | | | | | | | | | | | | | | | | | | ¹¹✖ | ¹²✖ | ⁹✖ | ⁹✖ | | ⁸32 | ¹¹✖ | | ¹²✖ | ¹¹✖ | | ¹¹32 | ¹⁰32 | ⁹✖ | ¹¹ƒ | ⁹✖ |
| Tennessee Tech | SoCon | 12 | - | - | - | - | - | ⁸32 | | | ⁷32 | | ⁷32 | | ¹¹32 | ⁷32 | ⁹✖ | ¹²✖ | ¹⁰✖ | | | | | | ¹⁵✖ | ¹⁴✖ | | | | | | | | | | | | | | | | | | | | | | ¹⁶✖ | | ¹⁶✖ | |
| Saint Francis (PA) | D3 | 12 | - | - | - | - | - | | | | | | | | | | | | | | | ¹⁵✖ | ¹⁵✖ | ¹⁶✖ | ¹⁶✖ | ¹⁴✖ | | ¹⁶✖ | ¹⁵✖ | ¹⁵✖ | ¹⁴✖ | | | | | ¹⁵✖ | ¹³✖ | | | | | | | ¹⁶✖ | | | | | | | |
| Temple | American | 11 | - | - | - | - | - | | | | | | | | ⁸32 | | | | | | | | | | | | | ¹⁴✖ | | ¹¹✖ | ⁶32 | ⁶✖ | ⁸32 | ¹¹✖ | ⁹✖ | ⁸32 | ¹⁰32 | | | | | | ⁷✖ | | | | | | | | |
| Tulane | American | 11 | - | - | - | - | - | | | | | | | | | | | | | | ¹⁵✖ | ¹⁴✖ | ⁴32 | ¹²✖ | ⁶✖ | ⁶32 | ¹⁰✖ | ¹⁰32 | ¹¹✖ | | | | | | | ¹²✖ | | | | | ¹²✖ | | | | | | | | | | |
| Florida Gulf Coast | ASUN | 11 | - | - | - | - | - | | | | | | | | | | | | | | | | | | | | | | | | | | | | | | | ¹²✖ | | ¹²✖ | ⁷32 | | ¹³✖ | ¹²32 | ¹³✖ | ¹¹✖ | ¹²32 | ¹²32 | ¹²✖ | ¹⁴✖ | |
| Maine | America East | 10 | - | - | - | - | - | | | | | | | | | | | | | | ¹⁶✖ | ¹¹✖ | ¹³✖ | ¹³✖ | ¹⁰32 | ¹²✖ | | | | ¹³✖ | | | | | | | | | | | | | | ¹⁵✖ | ¹⁴✖ | | | | ¹⁵✖ | | |
| South Florida | American | 10 | - | - | - | - | - | | | | | | | | | | | | | | | | | | | | | | | | | ⁹✖ | | | | | | | ¹⁰32 | | ⁶32 | ⁶32 | ¹¹✖ | ⁶✖ | | ⁸32 | ⁹✖ | ⁸32 | | ¹²✖ | |
| Toledo | MAC | 9 | - | - | - | - | - | | | | | | | | | | ¹¹32 | ¹⁰32 | | | ¹³✖ | ¹⁰32 | ¹⁰✖ | | ⁶✖ | | ¹²✖ | | | | | | | | | | | | | | | | ¹⁰✖ | | | | | ¹²32 | | | |
| Vermont | America East | 9 | - | - | - | - | - | | | | | | | | | | | ⁹✖ | ⁸✖ | ¹³✖ | | | | | | ¹¹✖ | | | | | | | | | ¹⁶✖ | ¹⁰32 | | | | | | | | | | | | ¹⁵✖ | | ¹⁵✖ | ¹⁴✖ |
| Hampton | CAA | 9 | - | - | - | - | - | | | | | | | | | | | | | | | | | | | ¹⁶✖ | | | ¹⁵✖ | ¹⁶✖ | | | | | | ¹⁵✖ | ¹³✖ | ¹⁶✖ | ¹⁵✖ | ¹²✖ | | | ¹⁵✖ | | | | | | | | |
| Northwestern | Big Ten | 8 | - | - | - | - | - | ⁶32 | | | | | ⁸32 | | | ⁴32 | ⁶32 | | ⁸32 | | | | ¹²✖ | | | | | | | | | | | | | | | | | | ⁷✖ | | | | | ⁷32 | | | | | |
| Fairfield | Metro | 8 | - | - | - | - | - | | | | | | | ¹⁰✖ | | | ¹²✖ | | | | | | | ¹⁵✖ | | | ¹²✖ | | | | | | | | | | | | | | | | | | | | ¹⁵✖ | | ¹³✖ | ¹²✖ | ¹¹✖ |
| Hawaii | Mountain West | 8 | - | - | - | - | - | | | | | | | | ¹²✖ | ⁹32 | | | | ¹²✖ | | ¹¹✖ | | ⁸✖ | | | | | | | | | | | | | | | | | | ¹⁴✖ | | | | | ¹⁵✖ | ¹⁴✖ | | | |
| Jackson State | SWAC | 7 | - | - | - | - | - | ⁷32 | ⁸✖ | | | | | | | | | | | | ¹⁵✖ | | | | | | | | | | | | | ¹⁵✖ | | | | | | | | | | | | ¹⁵✖ | ¹⁴✖ | | ¹⁴✖ | | |
| Howard | MEAC | 7 | - | - | - | - | - | ⁸32 | | | | | | | | | | | | | | ¹⁶✖ | ¹⁶✖ | ¹⁵✖ | | | ¹⁵✖ | | | | | | | | | | | | | | | | | | | | ¹⁶✖ | | | | ¹⁴✖ |
| Saint Peter's | Metro | 7 | - | - | - | - | - | ⁸32 | | | | | | | | | | ¹¹✖ | ¹²✖ | | | | ¹⁵✖ | | ¹³✖ | ¹⁴✖ | | ¹¹✖ | | | | | | | | | | | | | | | | | | | | | | | |
| Dartmouth | Ivy League | 7 | - | - | - | - | - | | ⁸✖ | | | | | | | | | | | | ¹⁴✖ | | | | ¹⁴✖ | ¹³✖ | | | | | ¹⁴✖ | ¹⁴✖ | | | ¹⁶✖ | | | | | | | | | | | | | | | | |
| Wisconsin | Big Ten | 7 | - | - | - | - | - | | | | | | | | | | | ⁶✖ | | | ¹⁰32 | ⁶32 | | ⁶✖ | | | ⁷✖ | ⁸✖ | | | | | | | | ⁷✖ | | | | | | | | | | | | | | | |
| SMU | ACC | 7 | - | - | - | - | - | | | | | | | | | | | | | ¹³✖ | ¹⁰32 | ¹⁰✖ | | ¹¹✖ | ¹¹32 | ¹²32 | | | | | | | | ¹²✖ | | | | | | | | | | | | | | | | | |
| Austin Peay | UAC | 7 | - | - | - | - | - | | | | | | | | | | | | | | | ¹⁴✖ | | | | | ¹⁶✖ | ¹⁵✖ | ¹⁴✖ | ¹³✖ | | | | | ¹⁶✖ | ¹⁶✖ | | | | | | | | | | | | | | | |
| Harvard | Ivy League | 7 | - | - | - | - | - | | | | | | | | | | | | | | | ¹⁴✖ | ¹⁶✖ | ¹⁶32 | | | | ¹³✖ | ¹⁴✖ | | | | ¹⁵✖ | | | | | | | | | | | | | | | | | ¹⁰✖ | |
| UCF | Big 12 | 7 | - | - | - | - | - | | | | | | | | | | | | | | | ¹⁶✖ | | | ¹⁶✖ | | | | | | | | | | ¹⁴✖ | | ¹³✖ | | | | | | | | ¹²✖ | ¹⁰✖ | ⁷32 | | | | |
| Southern | | | | | | | | | ¹⁶✖ | | | ¹⁶ƒ | | ¹⁶✖ | ¹⁶✖ | | | | | | | | | | | | | | | | | | | | | | | | | | | | | | | | | | | | |
| Belmont | Missouri Valley | 7 | - | - | - | - | - | | | | | | | | | | | | | | | | | | | | | | | | | | ¹⁴✖ | | | | | | | | | ¹³✖ | ¹³✖ | ¹²✖ | ¹³✖ | ¹²32 | ¹²32 | | | | |
| Fresno State | Pac-12 | 7 | - | - | - | - | - | | | | | | | | | | | | | | | | | | | | | | | | | | | ¹⁴✖ | ¹³✖ | ¹³✖ | ¹²✖ | ¹²✖ | ¹⁵✖ | ¹³✖ | | | | | | | | | | | |
| Albany | America East | 7 | - | - | - | - | - | | | | | | | | | | | | | | | | | | | | | | | | | | | | | | | ¹⁴✖ | ¹⁴✖ | ¹⁵✖ | ¹³✖ | ¹²32 | ¹⁶✖ | | | | ¹⁶✖ | | | | |
| Kent State | MAC | 6 | - | - | - | - | - | ⁸32 | | | | | | | | | | | | | | ¹⁰32 | | ¹³✖ | | ⁹✖ | | ¹⁴✖ | | | | | | | | | | | | | | | | | | | | | ¹⁵✖ | | |
| Illinois State | Missouri Valley | 6 | - | - | - | - | - | | ⁶32 | | ⁸32 | | | | ⁷32 | | | | | | | | | | | | | | | | | ¹⁵✖ | | | ¹³✖ | | | | | | | | | | | | | ¹⁵✖ | | | |
| New Mexico State | CUSA | 6 | - | - | - | - | - | | | | | | ⁹✖ | ⁶32 | | | | | | | | | | | | | | | | | | | | | | | | | | | ¹⁶✖ | ¹⁵✖ | ¹⁵✖ | | ¹⁴✖ | | | | | | |
| Richmond | Atlantic 10 | 6 | - | - | - | - | - | | | | | | | | | ¹⁰✖ | ⁷✖ | | | | | | | | | | | | | | ¹¹✖ | | | | | | | | | | | | | | | | | | ¹⁰✖ | ⁸32 | ¹¹ƒ |
| Santa Clara | West Coast | 6 | - | - | - | - | - | | | | | | | | | | | ¹²32 | | ¹¹✖ | | | | ¹⁴✖ | ¹³✖ | | | ¹¹✖ | | | ¹⁵✖ | | | | | | | | | | | | | | | | | | | | |
| FIU | CUSA | 6 | - | - | - | - | - | | | | | | | | | | | | | ⁸✖ | ⁹32 | | ¹⁴✖ | ⁷32 | ⁹✖ | | | ⁵32 | | | | | | | | | | | | | | | | | | | | | | | |
| Boise State | Pac-12 | 6 | - | - | - | - | - | | | | | | | | | | | | | ⁹✖ | | | | | | | | | | | | | ¹²✖ | | | | | | | | ¹⁵✖ | | ¹³✖ | ¹⁶✖ | ¹³✖ | | | | | | |
| Grambling State | SWAC | 6 | - | - | - | - | - | | | | | | | | | | | | | ¹⁵✖ | | ¹⁶✖ | ¹⁴✖ | ¹⁶✖ | ¹²✖ | | | | | | | | | | | | | | | | | | | ¹⁵✖ | | | | | | | |
| Portland | West Coast | 6 | - | - | - | - | - | | | | | | | | | | | | | ¹⁵✖ | ¹³✖ | ¹³✖ | ⁹✖ | | | | | | | | | | | | | | | | | | | | | | | | | ¹²✖ | ¹³✖ | | |
| Oral Roberts | Summit | 6 | - | - | - | - | - | | | | | | | | | | | | | | | | | | ¹⁶✖ | | ¹⁵✖ | | | | ¹⁴✖ | | ¹⁵✖ | ¹⁶✖ | | | | | ¹⁵✖ | | | | | | | | | | | | |
| Hartford | D3 | 6 | - | - | - | - | - | | | | | | | | | | | | | | | | | | | | | ¹⁶✖ | | | ¹⁴✖ | ¹¹32 | | ¹⁰32 | | ¹⁰✖ | ¹⁶✖ | | | | | | | | | | | | | | |
| Robert Morris | Horizon | 6 | - | - | - | - | - | | | | | | | | | | | | | | | | | | | | | | | | | | ¹³✖ | ¹⁵✖ | | | | | | ¹⁶✖ | | ¹⁶✖ | ¹⁶✖ | | ¹⁶✖ | | | | | | |
| Prairie View A&M | SWAC | 6 | - | - | - | - | - | | | | | | | | | | | | | | | | | | | | | | | | | | ¹⁶✖ | | ¹⁶✖ | | ¹⁶✖ | ¹⁶✖ | ¹⁶✖ | ¹⁶✖ | | | | | | | | | | | |
| Little Rock | UAC | 6 | - | - | - | - | - | | | | | | | | | | | | | | | | | | | | | | | | | | | | | ¹¹32 | ¹²✖ | ¹⁴✖ | | | ¹¹32 | | | ¹⁴✖ | ¹²✖ | | | | | | |
| Idaho | Big Sky | 5 | - | - | - | - | - | | | | ⁵32 | | | | | | | | | | | | | | | | | | | | | | | | | | | | ¹⁶✖ | ¹⁴✖ | | ¹⁶✖ | | | | | | | | | ¹³✖ |
| Houston | Big 12 | 5 | - | - | - | - | - | | | | | | | ⁶32 | | | | ⁸✖ | | | | | | | | | | | | ³32 | ¹⁰✖ | | | | | | ⁸✖ | | | | | | | | | | | | | | |
| Northern Illinois | Horizon | 5 | - | - | - | - | - | | | | | | | | | ⁵32 | | ¹¹32 | ¹¹✖ | ¹¹✖ | ¹⁶✖ | | | | | | | | | | | | | | | | | | | | | | | | | | | | | | |
| North Carolina A&T | CAA | 5 | - | - | - | - | - | | | | | | | | | | | | | ¹⁶✖ | | | | | | | | | | | | | | | ¹⁴✖ | | | | | | | ¹⁶✖ | | ¹⁵✖ | | ¹⁶✖ | | | | | |
| Lehigh | Patriot | 5 | - | - | - | - | - | | | | | | | | | | | | | | | | ¹⁶✖ | | | | | | | | | | | | ¹⁵✖ | ¹³✖ | | | | | | | | | | ¹³✖ | | | | ¹⁵✖ | |
| Penn | Ivy League | 5 | - | - | - | - | - | | | | | | | | | | | | | | | | | | | | ¹⁵✖ | | | ¹⁵✖ | | | | | | | | | | ¹²✖ | | ¹⁰✖ | ¹²✖ | | | | | | | | |
| Sacred Heart | Metro | 5 | - | - | - | - | - | | | | | | | | | | | | | | | | | | | | | | | | | ¹⁵✖ | | | ¹⁴✖ | | | ¹³✖ | | | | | | | | | | ¹⁶✖ | ¹⁶ƒ | | |
| UT Martin | Ohio Valley | 5 | - | - | - | - | - | | | | | | | | | | | | | | | | | | | | | | | | | | | | | | ¹⁵✖ | ¹⁵✖ | ¹⁶✖ | ¹³✖ | | | | | | | | | ¹⁶ƒ | | |
| La Salle | Atlantic 10 | 4 | - | - | - | - | - | | ⁸✖ | | | ¹⁰✖ | | ⁸✖ | ⁹32 | | | | | | | | | | | | | | | | | | | | | | | | | | | | | | | | | | | | |
| Manhattan | Metro | 4 | - | - | - | - | - | | | | | | ¹⁰✖ | | | ¹²✖ | | | | | | ¹⁴✖ | | | | | | | ¹⁴✖ | | | | | | | | | | | | | | | | | | | | | | |
| Cincinnati | Big 12 | 4 | - | - | - | - | - | | | | | | | | ⁸✖ | | | | | | | | | | ¹²✖ | | | ⁶32 | ¹⁰✖ | | | | | | | | | | | | | | | | | | | | | | |
| Northwestern State | Southland | 4 | - | - | - | - | - | | | | | | | | ¹⁰✖ | | | | | | | | | | | | | | | ¹⁶✖ | | | | | | | | | | ¹⁶✖ | ¹⁵✖ | | | | | | | | | | |
| Appalachian State | Sun Belt | 4 | - | - | - | - | - | | | | | | | | | ¹¹✖ | ¹²✖ | | | | | ¹³✖ | | | ¹⁶✖ | | | | | | | | | | | | | | | | | | | | | | | | | | |
| Washington State | Pac-12 | 4 | - | - | - | - | - | | | | | | | | | | ¹¹✖ | | | | | | | | | | | | | | | | | | | | | | | | | | | | | ⁹✖ | ⁸✖ | ⁵✖ | | | |
| Montana State | Big Sky | 4 | - | - | - | - | - | | | | | | | | | | | | ¹⁰✖ | | | | | | | | | | | | | | | | | | | | | | | | ¹⁴✖ | | | | ¹⁶✖ | | | ¹³✖ | |
| Mount St. Mary's | Metro | 4 | - | - | - | - | - | | | | | | | | | | | | | ¹⁴✖ | ¹³✖ | | | | | | | | | | | | | | | | | | | | | | | | | ¹⁵✖ | ¹⁶ƒ | | | | |
| Radford | Big South | 4 | - | - | - | - | - | | | | | | | | | | | | | ¹⁶✖ | ¹¹✖ | ¹⁶✖ | | | | | | | | | | | | | | | | | | | | | | | ¹⁴✖ | | | | | | |
| Troy | Sun Belt | 4 | - | - | - | - | - | | | | | | | | | | | | | | | | ¹³✖ | | | | | | | | | | | | | | | | | | | ¹⁵✖ | ¹⁵✖ | | | ¹⁵✖ | | | | | |
| Cal State Northridge | Big West | 4 | - | - | - | - | - | | | | | | | | | | | | | | | | | | ¹⁵✖ | | | | | | | | | | | | | | | ¹⁶✖ | ¹³✖ | | | ¹⁶✖ | | | | | | | |
| Rice | American | 4 | - | - | - | - | - | | | | | | | | | | | | | | | | | | | ¹³32 | | | | | ¹¹✖ | | | | | | | | | | | | | | ¹²✖ | | | | ¹⁴✖ | | |
| Pepperdine | West Coast | 4 | - | - | - | - | - | | | | | | | | | | | | | | | | | | | ¹³✖ | | ⁸✖ | ¹²✖ | | | ¹⁵✖ | | | | | | | | | | | | | | | | | | | |
| Idaho State | Big Sky | 4 | - | - | - | - | - | | | | | | | | | | | | | | | | | | | | ¹⁴✖ | | | | | | ¹⁵✖ | | | | | ¹⁴✖ | | | | | | | | ¹³✖ | | | | | |
| Bucknell | Patriot | 4 | - | - | - | - | - | | | | | | | | | | | | | | | | | | | | | ¹⁵✖ | | | | | | ¹⁶✖ | | | | | | | | | ¹⁴✖ | | ¹²✖ | | | | | | |
| Norfolk State | MEAC | 4 | - | - | - | - | - | | | | | | | | | | | | | | | | | | | | | ¹⁶✖ | | | | | | | | | | | | | | | | | | | | ¹⁶✖ | ¹⁵✖ | ¹³✖ | |
| Mercer | SoCon | 4 | - | - | - | - | - | | | | | | | | | | | | | | | | | | | | | | | | | | | | | | | | | | | | | ¹³✖ | ¹⁵✖ | ¹⁶✖ | ¹⁵✖ | | | | |
| East Carolina | American | 3 | - | - | - | - | - | ⁶32 | | | | | | | | | | | | | | | | | | | | | | | | | ¹³✖ | | | | | | | | | | | | | | | ¹³✖ | | | |
| Ohio | MAC | 3 | - | - | - | - | - | | | | | ⁹✖ | | | | | | | | | ¹⁴✖ | | | | | | | | | | | | | | | | | | | | ¹⁴✖ | | | | | | | | | | |
| San Diego | West Coast | 3 | - | - | - | - | - | | | | | | | | | | | | ¹¹✖ | | | | | | | ¹⁵✖ | | | | | | | | ¹⁴✖ | | | | | | | | | | | | | | | | | |
| Tennessee State | Ohio Valley | 3 | - | - | - | - | - | | | | | | | | | | | | | ¹³✖ | ¹²✖ | | | | | | | | | | | | | | | | | | | | ¹⁵✖ | | | | | | | | | | |
| Fordham | Atlantic 10 | 3 | - | - | - | - | - | | | | | | | | | | | | | ¹⁶✖ | | | | | | | | | | | | | | | | | | | | ¹⁰✖ | | | | | ¹⁴✖ | | | | | | |
| Western Illinois | Ohio Valley | 3 | - | - | - | - | - | | | | | | | | | | | | | | ¹⁴✖ | | | | | | | | | | | | | | | | | | | | | | ¹⁴✖ | | | | | | | | ¹³✖ |
| UMass | MAC | 3 | - | - | - | - | - | | | | | | | | | | | | | | | ⁸✖ | | ¹³✖ | | | | | | | | | | | | | | | | | | | | | | | ¹²✖ | | | | |
| Youngstown State | Horizon | 3 | - | - | - | - | - | | | | | | | | | | | | | | | ¹⁵✖ | | ¹²32 | | ¹⁵✖ | | | | | | | | | | | | | | | | | | | | | | | | | |
| Alcorn State | SWAC | 3 | - | - | - | - | - | | | | | | | | | | | | | | | | | | | ¹⁶✖ | ¹⁶✖ | | | | ¹⁶✖ | | | | | | | | | | | | | | | | | | | | |
| Georgia State | Sun Belt | 3 | - | - | - | - | - | | | | | | | | | | | | | | | | | | | | ¹⁴✖ | ¹⁵✖ | ¹⁶✖ | | | | | | | | | | | | | | | | | | | | | | |
| Charlotte | American | 3 | - | - | - | - | - | | | | | | | | | | | | | | | | | | | | | | ¹²✖ | | | | | | ¹¹✖ | | | | | | | | | | | | ¹⁴✖ | | | | |
| Alabama State | SWAC | 3 | - | - | - | - | - | | | | | | | | | | | | | | | | | | | | | | ¹⁶✖ | | | | | | | | | | | | ¹⁵✖ | ¹⁵✖ | | | | | | | | | |
| UT Arlington | UAC | 3 | - | - | - | - | - | | | | | | | | | | | | | | | | | | | | | | | | ¹³✖ | | ¹³✖ | | | | | | | | | | | | | | ¹⁴✖ | | | | |
| Coppin State | MEAC | 3 | - | - | - | - | - | | | | | | | | | | | | | | | | | | | | | | | | ¹⁶✖ | ¹⁵✖ | | ¹⁶✖ | | | | | | | | | | | | | | | | | |
| Stetson | ASUN | 3 | - | - | - | - | - | | | | | | | | | | | | | | | | | | | | | | | | ¹⁶✖ | | | | | | ¹⁶✖ | | ¹⁴✖ | | | | | | | | | | | | |
| Army | Patriot | 3 | - | - | - | - | - | | | | | | | | | | | | | | | | | | | | | | | | | ¹⁵✖ | | | | | | | | ¹³✖ | | ¹³✖ | | | | | | | | | |
| UC Riverside | Big West | 3 | - | - | - | - | - | | | | | | | | | | | | | | | | | | | | | | | | | ¹⁶✖ | ¹⁴✖ | | | ¹⁶✖ | | | | | | | | | | | | | | | |
| UNC Asheville | Big South | 3 | - | - | - | - | - | | | | | | | | | | | | | | | | | | | | | | | | | | ¹⁴✖ | | | | | | | | | ¹⁴✖ | ¹⁶✖ | | | | | | | | |
| East Tennessee State | SoCon | 3 | - | - | - | - | - | | | | | | | | | | | | | | | | | | | | | | | | | | | ¹⁴✖ | ¹³✖ | ¹⁴✖ | | | | | | | | | | | | | | | |
| Murray State | Missouri Valley | 3 | - | - | - | - | - | | | | | | | | | | | | | | | | | | | | | | | | | | | ¹⁴✖ | | | | | | | | | | | | | | | | ¹¹✖ | ¹²✖ |
| Cleveland State | Horizon | 3 | - | - | - | - | - | | | | | | | | | | | | | | | | | | | | | | | | | | | ¹⁵✖ | | ¹⁵✖ | | | | | | | | | | | | ¹³✖ | | | |
| UTSA | American | 3 | - | - | - | - | - | | | | | | | | | | | | | | | | | | | | | | | | | | | ¹⁵✖ | ¹⁵✖ | | | | | | | | | | | | | | | | ¹⁶✖ |
| Drexel | CAA | 3 | - | - | - | - | - | | | | | | | | | | | | | | | | | | | | | | | | | | | | ¹²✖ | | | | | | | | | | | ¹⁴✖ | | | ¹⁶✖ | | |
| Northern Iowa | Missouri Valley | 3 | - | - | - | - | - | | | | | | | | | | | | | | | | | | | | | | | | | | | | | ¹⁶✖ | ¹³✖ | | | | | | ¹⁰✖ | | | | | | | | |
| Navy | Patriot | 3 | - | - | - | - | - | | | | | | | | | | | | | | | | | | | | | | | | | | | | | | ¹⁴✖ | ¹⁵✖ | ¹⁵✖ | | | | | | | | | | | | |
| Samford | SoCon | 3 | - | - | - | - | - | | | | | | | | | | | | | | | | | | | | | | | | | | | | | | ¹⁴✖ | ¹⁵✖ | | | | | | | | | | | | | ¹⁶ƒ |
| UC Davis | Mountain West | 3 | - | - | - | - | - | | | | | | | | | | | | | | | | | | | | | | | | | | | | | | ¹⁶✖ | | | | | | | | ¹⁵✖ | ¹²✖ | | | | | |
| Wichita State | American | 3 | - | - | - | - | - | | | | | | | | | | | | | | | | | | | | | | | | | | | | | | | | ¹⁴✖ | ¹⁴✖ | ¹³✖ | | | | | | | | | | |
| Wright State | Horizon | 3 | - | - | - | - | - | | | | | | | | | | | | | | | | | | | | | | | | | | | | | | | | | ¹⁴✖ | | | | | ¹³✖ | ¹³32 | | | | | |
| American | Patriot | 3 | - | - | - | - | - | | | | | | | | | | | | | | | | | | | | | | | | | | | | | | | | | | ¹⁴✖ | | | ¹⁴✖ | | | ¹⁴✖ | | | | |
| High Point | Big South | 3 | - | - | - | - | - | | | | | | | | | | | | | | | | | | | | | | | | | | | | | | | | | | | | | | | ¹⁶✖ | | | | ¹⁶ƒ | ¹⁵✖ |
| Monmouth | CAA | 2 | - | - | - | - | - | | ⁸32 | | | | | | | | | | | | | | | | | | | | | | | | | | | | | | | | | | | | | | | ¹⁶ƒ | | | |
| Western Michigan | MAC | 2 | - | - | - | - | - | | | | ⁸32 | | | | | | | | | | | | | | | | | | ¹⁴✖ | | | | | | | | | | | | | | | | | | | | | | |
| Eastern Washington | Big Sky | 2 | - | - | - | - | - | | | | | | ⁷✖ | | | | | | | | | | | | | | | | | | | | | | | | | | | | | | | | | | | | ¹⁴✖ | | |
| Wake Forest | ACC | 2 | - | - | - | - | - | | | | | | | ⁹32 | | | | | | | | | | | | | | | | | | | | | | | | | | | | | | | | ⁹✖ | | | | | |
| Cal State Fullerton | Big West | 2 | - | - | - | - | - | | | | | | | | ⁷✖ | | ⁷32 | | | | | | | | | | | | | | | | | | | | | | | | | | | | | | | | | | |
| Georgia Southern | Sun Belt | 2 | - | - | - | - | - | | | | | | | | | | | | ¹²✖ | ¹⁴✖ | | | | | | | | | | | | | | | | | | | | | | | | | | | | | | | |
| Loyola (MD) | Patriot | 2 | - | - | - | - | - | | | | | | | | | | | | | ¹⁴✖ | ¹⁰✖ | | | | | | | | | | | | | | | | | | | | | | | | | | | | | | |
| Furman | SoCon | 2 | - | - | - | - | - | | | | | | | | | | | | | | ¹⁵✖ | | | | | ¹⁶✖ | | | | | | | | | | | | | | | | | | | | | | | | | |
| UC Irvine | Big West | 2 | - | - | - | - | - | | | | | | | | | | | | | | ¹⁵✖ | | | | | | | | | | | | | | | | | | | | | | | | | | | | ¹³✖ | | |
| Florida A&M | SWAC | 2 | - | - | - | - | - | | | | | | | | | | | | | | ¹⁶✖ | | | | ¹⁵✖ | | | | | | | | | | | | | | | | | | | | | | | | | | |
| Rhode Island | Atlantic 10 | 2 | - | - | - | - | - | | | | | | | | | | | | | | | ¹⁰✖ | | | | | | | | | | | | | | | | | | | | | | | | | | | | | ¹¹✖ |
| Texas State | Pac-12 | 2 | - | - | - | - | - | | | | | | | | | | | | | | | | ¹⁴✖ | | | | | | ¹⁶✖ | | | | | | | | | | | | | | | | | | | | | | |
| Eastern Kentucky | UAC | 2 | - | - | - | - | - | | | | | | | | | | | | | | | | ¹⁵✖ | | | | | | | | ¹²✖ | | | | | | | | | | | | | | | | | | | | |
| Marshall | Sun Belt | 2 | - | - | - | - | - | | | | | | | | | | | | | | | | ¹⁵✖ | | | | | | | | | | | | | | | | | | | | | | | | | | ¹³✖ | | |
| UNC Greensboro | SoCon | 2 | - | - | - | - | - | | | | | | | | | | | | | | | | | ¹⁵✖ | | | | | | | | | | | | | | | | | | | | | | | | | | ¹⁶✖ | |
| Saint Mary's | West Coast | 2 | - | - | - | - | - | | | | | | | | | | | | | | | | | | ¹²✖ | | ⁹32 | | | | | | | | | | | | | | | | | | | | | | | | |
| Evansville | Missouri Valley | 2 | - | - | - | - | - | | | | | | | | | | | | | | | | | | ¹³✖ | | | | | | | | | | ¹⁵✖ | | | | | | | | | | | | | | | | |
| Milwaukee | Horizon | 2 | - | - | - | - | - | | | | | | | | | | | | | | | | | | | | ¹⁶✖ | | | | | ¹³✖ | | | | | | | | | | | | | | | | | | | |
| Weber State | Big Sky | 2 | - | - | - | - | - | | | | | | | | | | | | | | | | | | | | | ¹⁵✖ | ¹³✖ | | | | | | | | | | | | | | | | | | | | | | |
| Oakland | Horizon | 2 | - | - | - | - | - | | | | | | | | | | | | | | | | | | | | | ¹⁶✖ | | | | ¹⁶✖ | | | | | | | | | | | | | | | | | | | |
| Valparaiso | Missouri Valley | 2 | - | - | - | - | - | | | | | | | | | | | | | | | | | | | | | | ¹⁵✖ | ¹⁵✖ | | | | | | | | | | | | | | | | | | | | | |
| Eastern Michigan | MAC | 2 | - | - | - | - | - | | | | | | | | | | | | | | | | | | | | | | | ¹⁴✖ | | | | | | | | ¹²✖ | | | | | | | | | | | | | |
| Western Carolina | SoCon | 2 | - | - | - | - | - | | | | | | | | | | | | | | | | | | | | | | | | ¹⁶✖ | | | | ¹³✖ | | | | | | | | | | | | | | | | |
| Tulsa | American | 2 | - | - | - | - | - | | | | | | | | | | | | | | | | | | | | | | | | | ¹²32 | | | | | | | ¹⁶✖ | | | | | | | | | | | | |
| Southeast Missouri State | Ohio Valley | 2 | - | - | - | - | - | | | | | | | | | | | | | | | | | | | | | | | | | ¹⁴✖ | ¹⁴✖ | | | | | | | | | | | | | | | | | | |
| UTEP | Mountain West | 2 | - | - | - | - | - | | | | | | | | | | | | | | | | | | | | | | | | | | | ⁷32 | | | | ¹³✖ | | | | | | | | | | | | | |
| Wyoming | Mountain West | 2 | - | - | - | - | - | | | | | | | | | | | | | | | | | | | | | | | | | | | ¹¹✖ | | | | | | | | | | | | ¹⁴✖ | | | | | |
| Miami (OH) | MAC | 2 | - | - | - | - | - | | | | | | | | | | | | | | | | | | | | | | | | | | | ¹³✖ | | | | | | | | | | | | | | | | | ¹³✖ |
| Ball State | MAC | 2 | - | - | - | - | - | | | | | | | | | | | | | | | | | | | | | | | | | | | | ¹²32 | | | | | | | | | | | | | | | ¹²✖ | |
| VCU | Atlantic 10 | 2 | - | - | - | - | - | | | | | | | | | | | | | | | | | | | | | | | | | | | | ¹⁰✖ | | | | | | | | | | | ¹³✖ | | | | | |
| Portland State | Big Sky | 2 | - | - | - | - | - | | | | | | | | | | | | | | | | | | | | | | | | | | | | | ¹⁵✖ | | | | | | | | | ¹⁵✖ | | | | | | |
| Gardner–Webb | Big South | 2 | - | - | - | - | - | | | | | | | | | | | | | | | | | | | | | | | | | | | | | | ¹⁴✖ | | | | | | | | | | | ¹⁵✖ | | | |
| McNeese | Southland | 2 | - | - | - | - | - | | | | | | | | | | | | | | | | | | | | | | | | | | | | | | ¹⁵✖ | ¹⁵✖ | | | | | | | | | | | | | |
| Central Arkansas | UAC | 2 | - | - | - | - | - | | | | | | | | | | | | | | | | | | | | | | | | | | | | | | | | | | | ¹⁴✖ | ¹⁴✖ | | | | | | | | |
| Iona | Metro | 2 | - | - | - | - | - | | | | | | | | | | | | | | | | | | | | | | | | | | | | | | | | | | | ¹⁵✖ | | | | | | ¹⁴✖ | | | |
| Jacksonville | ASUN | 2 | - | - | - | - | - | | | | | | | | | | | | | | | | | | | | | | | | | | | | | | | | | | | ¹⁶✖ | | | | | | | | | ¹⁵✖ |
| Elon | CAA | 2 | - | - | - | - | - | | | | | | | | | | | | | | | | | | | | | | | | | | | | | | | | | | | | ¹¹✖ | ¹³✖ | | | | | | | |
| Columbia | Ivy League | 2 | - | - | - | - | - | | | | | | | | | | | | | | | | | | | | | | | | | | | | | | | | | | | | | | | | | | ¹²ƒ | ¹¹✖ | |
| California Baptist | Big West | 2 | - | - | - | - | - | | | | | | | | | | | | | | | | | | | | | | | | | | | | | | | | | | | | | | | | | | ¹⁵✖ | | ¹⁶✖ |
| Fairleigh Dickinson | NEC | 2 | - | - | - | - | - | | | | | | | | | | | | | | | | | | | | | | | | | | | | | | | | | | | | | | | | | | | ¹⁵✖ | ¹⁵✖ |
| UC San Diego | Big West | 2 | - | - | - | - | - | | | | | | | | | | | | | | | | | | | | | | | | | | | | | | | | | | | | | | | | | | | ¹⁶ƒ | ¹⁴✖ |
| South Carolina State | MEAC | 1 | - | - | - | - | - | | ⁸32 | | | | | | | | | | | | | | | | | | | | | | | | | | | | | | | | | | | | | | | | | | |
| LSU New Orleans | Southland | 1 | - | - | - | - | - | | | | | | ⁶32 | | | | | | | | | | | | | | | | | | | | | | | | | | | | | | | | | | | | | | |
| North Texas | American | 1 | - | - | - | - | - | | | | | ¹⁰✖ | | | | | | | | | | | | | | | | | | | | | | | | | | | | | | | | | | | | | | | |
| South Alabama | Sun Belt | 1 | - | - | - | - | - | | | | | | ⁸✖ | | | | | | | | | | | | | | | | | | | | | | | | | | | | | | | | | | | | | | |
| Eastern Illinois | Ohio Valley | 1 | - | - | - | - | - | | | | | | | ¹⁰✖ | | | | | | | | | | | | | | | | | | | | | | | | | | | | | | | | | | | | | |
| Brown | Ivy League | 1 | - | - | - | - | - | | | | | | | | | | | | | ¹⁶✖ | | | | | | | | | | | | | | | | | | | | | | | | | | | | | | | |
| Butler | Big East | 1 | - | - | - | - | - | | | | | | | | | | | | | | | ¹⁵✖ | | | | | | | | | | | | | | | | | | | | | | | | | | | | | |
| Detroit Mercy | Horizon | 1 | - | - | - | - | - | | | | | | | | | | | | | | | | ¹⁴✖ | | | | | | | | | | | | | | | | | | | | | | | | | | | | |
| Northeastern | CAA | 1 | - | - | - | - | - | | | | | | | | | | | | | | | | | | ¹³✖ | | | | | | | | | | | | | | | | | | | | | | | | | | |
| Campbell | CAA | 1 | - | - | - | - | - | | | | | | | | | | | | | | | | | | | ¹⁵✖ | | | | | | | | | | | | | | | | | | | | | | | | | |
| Denver | West Coast | 1 | - | - | - | - | - | | | | | | | | | | | | | | | | | | | | ¹⁰✖ | | | | | | | | | | | | | | | | | | | | | | | | |
| Siena | Metro | 1 | - | - | - | - | - | | | | | | | | | | | | | | | | | | | | ¹¹✖ | | | | | | | | | | | | | | | | | | | | | | | | |
| LIU | NEC | 1 | - | - | - | - | - | | | | | | | | | | | | | | | | | | | | ¹⁶✖ | | | | | | | | | | | | | | | | | | | | | | | | |
| Boston University | Patriot | 1 | - | - | - | - | - | | | | | | | | | | | | | | | | | | | | | | ¹⁶✖ | | | | | | | | | | | | | | | | | | | | | | |
| Loyola Marymount | West Coast | 1 | - | - | - | - | - | | | | | | | | | | | | | | | | | | | | | | | ¹³✖ | | | | | | | | | | | | | | | | | | | | | |
| Lipscomb | ASUN | 1 | - | - | - | - | - | | | | | | | | | | | | | | | | | | | | | | | ¹⁵✖ | | | | | | | | | | | | | | | | | | | | | |
| Colgate | Patriot | 1 | - | - | - | - | - | | | | | | | | | | | | | | | | | | | | | | | ¹⁶✖ | | | | | | | | | | | | | | | | | | | | | |
| Canisius | Metro | 1 | - | - | - | - | - | | | | | | | | | | | | | | | | | | | | | | | | ¹⁵✖ | | | | | | | | | | | | | | | | | | | | |
| Northern Arizona | Big Sky | 1 | - | - | - | - | - | | | | | | | | | | | | | | | | | | | | | | | | | ¹⁴✖ | | | | | | | | | | | | | | | | | | | |
| Florida Atlantic | American | 1 | - | - | - | - | - | | | | | | | | | | | | | | | | | | | | | | | | | ¹⁶✖ | | | | | | | | | | | | | | | | | | | |
| Louisiana | Sun Belt | 1 | - | - | - | - | - | | | | | | | | | | | | | | | | | | | | | | | | | | ¹¹✖ | | | | | | | | | | | | | | | | | | |
| Delaware State | MEAC | 1 | - | - | - | - | - | | | | | | | | | | | | | | | | | | | | | | | | | | ¹⁵✖ | | | | | | | | | | | | | | | | | | |
| UMBC | America East | 1 | - | - | - | - | - | | | | | | | | | | | | | | | | | | | | | | | | | | ¹⁶✖ | | | | | | | | | | | | | | | | | | |
| Cornell | Ivy League | 1 | - | - | - | - | - | | | | | | | | | | | | | | | | | | | | | | | | | | | ¹⁶✖ | | | | | | | | | | | | | | | | | |
| Cal Poly | Big West | 1 | - | - | - | - | - | | | | | | | | | | | | | | | | | | | | | | | | | | | | | | | | ¹⁴✖ | | | | | | | | | | | | |
| Akron | MAC | 1 | - | - | - | - | - | | | | | | | | | | | | | | | | | | | | | | | | | | | | | | | | | ¹³✖ | | | | | | | | | | | |
| North Dakota | Summit | 1 | - | - | - | - | - | | | | | | | | | | | | | | | | | | | | | | | | | | | | | | | | | ¹⁴✖ | | | | | | | | | | | |
| Winthrop | Big South | 1 | - | - | - | - | - | | | | | | | | | | | | | | | | | | | | | | | | | | | | | | | | | ¹⁵✖ | | | | | | | | | | | |
| Savannah State | D2 | 1 | - | - | - | - | - | | | | | | | | | | | | | | | | | | | | | | | | | | | | | | | | | | ¹⁶✖ | | | | | | | | | | |
| St. Francis Brooklyn | defunct | 1 | - | - | - | - | - | | | | | | | | | | | | | | | | | | | | | | | | | | | | | | | | | | ¹⁶✖ | | | | | | | | | | |
| Duquesne | Atlantic 10 | 1 | - | - | - | - | - | | | | | | | | | | | | | | | | | | | | | | | | | | | | | | | | | | | ⁹32 | | | | | | | | | |
| Texas Southern | SWAC | 1 | - | - | - | - | - | | | | | | | | | | | | | | | | | | | | | | | | | | | | | | | | | | | | ¹⁶✖ | | | | | | | | |
| Northern Colorado | Big Sky | 1 | - | - | - | - | - | | | | | | | | | | | | | | | | | | | | | | | | | | | | | | | | | | | | | ¹⁰✖ | | | | | | | |
| Seattle | West Coast | 1 | - | - | - | - | - | | | | | | | | | | | | | | | | | | | | | | | | | | | | | | | | | | | | | ¹⁵✖ | | | | | | | |
| Nicholls | Southland | 1 | - | - | - | - | - | | | | | | | | | | | | | | | | | | | | | | | | | | | | | | | | | | | | | ¹⁶✖ | | | | | | | |
| Towson | CAA | 1 | - | - | - | - | - | | | | | | | | | | | | | | | | | | | | | | | | | | | | | | | | | | | | | | ¹⁵✖ | | | | | | |
| Abilene Christian | UAC | 1 | - | - | - | - | - | | | | | | | | | | | | | | | | | | | | | | | | | | | | | | | | | | | | | | ¹⁶✖ | | | | | | |
| Bethune–Cookman | SWAC | 1 | - | - | - | - | - | | | | | | | | | | | | | | | | | | | | | | | | | | | | | | | | | | | | | | ¹⁶✖ | | | | | | |
| Bradley | Missouri Valley | 1 | - | - | - | - | - | | | | | | | | | | | | | | | | | | | | | | | | | | | | | | | | | | | | | | | ¹¹✖ | | | | | |
| Stony Brook | CAA | 1 | - | - | - | - | - | | | | | | | | | | | | | | | | | | | | | | | | | | | | | | | | | | | | | | | ¹⁴✖ | | | | | |
| Utah Valley | Big West | 1 | - | - | - | - | - | | | | | | | | | | | | | | | | | | | | | | | | | | | | | | | | | | | | | | | ¹⁶✖ | | | | | |
| IU Indy | Horizon | 1 | - | - | - | - | - | | | | | | | | | | | | | | | | | | | | | | | | | | | | | | | | | | | | | | | | ¹³✖ | | | | |
| Longwood | Big South | 1 | - | - | - | - | - | | | | | | | | | | | | | | | | | | | | | | | | | | | | | | | | | | | | | | | | ¹⁶✖ | | | | |
| Incarnate Word | Southland | 1 | - | - | - | - | - | | | | | | | | | | | | | | | | | | | | | | | | | | | | | | | | | | | | | | | | ¹⁶ƒ | | | | |
| Sacramento State | Big West | 1 | - | - | - | - | - | | | | | | | | | | | | | | | | | | | | | | | | | | | | | | | | | | | | | | | | | ¹³✖ | | | |
| Saint Louis | Atlantic 10 | 1 | - | - | - | - | - | | | | | | | | | | | | | | | | | | | | | | | | | | | | | | | | | | | | | | | | | ¹³✖ | | | |
| Southern Utah | Big Sky | 1 | - | - | - | - | - | | | | | | | | | | | | | | | | | | | | | | | | | | | | | | | | | | | | | | | | | ¹⁴✖ | | | |
| Southeastern Louisiana | Southland | 1 | - | - | - | - | - | | | | | | | | | | | | | | | | | | | | | | | | | | | | | | | | | | | | | | | | | ¹⁵✖ | | | |
| Presbyterian | Big South | 1 | - | - | - | - | - | | | | | | | | | | | | | | | | | | | | | | | | | | | | | | | | | | | | | | | | | | ¹⁶✖ | | |
| Texas A&M–Corpus Christi | Southland | 1 | - | - | - | - | - | | | | | | | | | | | | | | | | | | | | | | | | | | | | | | | | | | | | | | | | | | ¹⁶✖ | | |
| George Mason | Atlantic 10 | 1 | - | - | - | - | - | | | | | | | | | | | | | | | | | | | | | | | | | | | | | | | | | | | | | | | | | | | ¹¹✖ | |
| Grand Canyon | Mountain West | 1 | - | - | - | - | - | | | | | | | | | | | | | | | | | | | | | | | | | | | | | | | | | | | | | | | | | | | ¹³✖ | |
| Arkansas State | Sun Belt | 1 | - | - | - | - | - | | | | | | | | | | | | | | | | | | | | | | | | | | | | | | | | | | | | | | | | | | | ¹⁵✖ | |
| William & Mary | CAA | 1 | - | - | - | - | - | | | | | | | | | | | | | | | | | | | | | | | | | | | | | | | | | | | | | | | | | | | ¹⁶✖ | |
| Charleston | CAA | 1 | - | - | - | - | - | | | | | | | | | | | | | | | | | | | | | | | | | | | | | | | | | | | | | | | | | | | | ¹⁴✖ |

== Tournament trends ==
=== Top-ranked teams ===
Since the women's tournament began in 1982, 20 teams have entered the tournament ranked #1 in at least 1 poll and gone on to win the tournament:

- 1982: Louisiana Tech
- 1983: USC
- 1986: Texas
- 1989: Tennessee
- 1995: UConn
- 1998: Tennessee
- 1999: Purdue
- 2000: UConn
- 2002: UConn
- 2003: UConn
- 2009: UConn
- 2010: UConn
- 2012: Baylor
- 2014: UConn
- 2015: UConn
- 2016: UConn
- 2019: Baylor
- 2021: Stanford
- 2022: South Carolina
- 2024: South Carolina

=== Champions excluded the next year ===
Only once has the reigning champion (the previous year's winner) not made it to the tournament the next year.

- 1985 champion Old Dominion went 15–13 in 1986.

=== No. 1 seeds ===
Since 1982, at least one #1 seed has made the Final Four every year.

Under coach Geno Auriemma, Connecticut has been seeded #1 a record 23 times. Tennessee is second with 21 #1 seeds.

All four #1 seeds have made it to the Final Four 5 times (champion in bold):

- 1989 Auburn, Louisiana Tech, Maryland, **Tennessee**
- 2012 **Baylor**, UConn, Notre Dame, Stanford
- 2015 **UConn**, Maryland, Notre Dame, South Carolina
- 2018 UConn, Mississippi State, **Notre Dame**, Louisville
- 2026 UConn, **UCLA**, South Carolina, Texas

The championship game has matched two #1 seeds 16 times:

- 1983 USC beat Louisiana Tech
- 1986 Texas beat USC
- 1989 Tennessee beat Auburn
- 1991 Tennessee beat Virginia
- 1995 UConn beat Tennessee
- 2000 UConn beat Tennessee
- 2002 UConn beat Oklahoma
- 2003 UConn beat Tennessee
- 2010 UConn beat Stanford
- 2012 Baylor beat Notre Dame
- 2014 UConn beat Notre Dame
- 2015 UConn beat Notre Dame
- 2018 Notre Dame beat Mississippi State
- 2019 Baylor beat Notre Dame
- 2024 South Carolina beat Iowa
- 2026 UCLA beat South Carolina

Four teams have beaten three #1 seeds during the course of a tournament, the largest number of such teams that can be faced. This can only happen by a lower seed advancing to the final four over a #1 seed, then winning tournament over two more #1 seeds.

- 1987 #2 Tennessee (beat Auburn, Long Beach State, Louisiana Tech)
- 1988 #2 Louisiana Tech (beat Auburn, Tennessee, Texas)
- 2005 #2 Baylor (beat LSU, Michigan State, North Carolina)
- 2025 #2 UConn (beat USC, UCLA, South Carolina)

Prior to the expansion of the tournament to 64 teams, all four #1 seeds advanced to the Sweet Sixteen with three exceptions. Notably, the first two times this occurred were at the hands of the same school:

- 1986 East #1 seed Virginia lost to #8 seed James Madison
- 1991 East #1 seed Penn State lost to #8 seed James Madison
- 1992 Midwest #1 seed Iowa lost to #8 seed Southwest Missouri State

=== High seeds ===
- 1999 was the first time in tournament history (since the expansion to 64 teams) that all top seeds (1, 2, 3, and 4 seeds) made it to the Sweet Sixteen.

=== Teams entering the tournament unbeaten ===
Of the 21 teams who have entered the tournament unbeaten, 10 went on to win the National Championship.

The first record here refers to the record before the first game of the NCAA tournament.

| Year | Team | Record | Result | Final record |
|---|---|---|---|---|
| 1986 | Texas | 29–0 | **Won** the tournament, beat USC | **34–0** |
| 1990 | Louisiana Tech | 29–0 | Lost in Final Four game to Auburn | 32–1 |
| 1992 | Vermont | 29–0 | Lost in Round of 64 game to George Washington | 29–1 |
| 1993 | Vermont | 28–0 | Lost in Round of 64 game to Rutgers | 28–1 |
| 1995 | UConn | 29–0 | **Won** the tournament, beat Tennessee | **35–0** |
| 1997 | UConn | 30–0 | Lost in Elite Eight game to Tennessee | 33–1 |
| 1998 | Tennessee | 33–0 | **Won** the tournament, beat Louisiana Tech | **39–0** |
| 1998 | Liberty | 28–0 | Lost in Round of 64 game to Tennessee | 28–1 |
| 2002 | UConn | 33–0 | **Won** the tournament, beat Oklahoma | **39–0** |
| 2009 | UConn | 33–0 | **Won** the tournament, beat Louisville | **39–0** |
| 2010 | UConn | 33–0 | **Won** the tournament, beat Stanford | **39–0** |
| 2012 | Baylor | 34–0 | **Won** the tournament, beat Notre Dame | **40–0** |
| 2014 | Notre Dame | 32–0 | Lost in championship game to UConn | 37–1 |
| 2014 | UConn | 34–0 | **Won** the tournament, beat Notre Dame | **40–0** |
| 2015 | Princeton | 30–0 | Lost in Round of 32 game to Maryland | 31–1 |
| 2016 | UConn | 32–0 | **Won** the tournament, beat Syracuse | **38–0** |
| 2017 | UConn | 32–0 | Lost in Final Four game to Mississippi State | 36–1 |
| 2018 | UConn | 32–0 | Lost in Final Four game to Notre Dame | 36–1 |
| 2023 | South Carolina | 32–0 | Lost in Final Four game to Iowa | 36–1 |
| 2024 | South Carolina | 32–0 | **Won** the tournament, beat Iowa | **38–0** |
| 2026 | UConn | 34–0 | Lost in Final Four game to South Carolina | 38–1 |

==== Undefeated teams not in the tournament ====
The NCAA tournament has undergone dramatic expansion since its first edition in 1982, and only one unbeaten team has failed to qualify for the tournament—California Baptist in 2021, which was 24–0 after winning the Western Athletic Conference Tournament. As, by definition, a team would have to win its conference tournament, and thus secure an automatic bid to the tournament, to be undefeated in a season, the only way a team could finish undefeated and not reach the tournament is if the team is banned from postseason play. (Other possibilities are that the team is independent, or is from a conference not yet eligible for an automatic bid.) Postseason bans can come about for one of two reasons:

- The team is serving a postseason ban due to NCAA sanctions.
- The team is transitioning from a lower NCAA division, during which time it is barred by NCAA rule from participation in NCAA-sponsored postseason play. This is the case for California Baptist, which began a transition from Division II in 2018 and thus could not play in the NCAA tournament until 2023. California Baptist was eligible for the WNIT because that tournament is not operated by the NCAA, unlike the men's version (or the Women's Basketball Invitation Tournament introduced in 2024); the Lancers lost in the quarterfinals to eventual champion Rice.

=== Home state ===
Only one team has ever played the Final Four on its home court. Two other teams have played the Final Four in their home cities, and seven others have played the Final Four in their home states.

The only team to play on its home court was Texas in 1987, which lost its semifinal game at the now-defunct Frank Erwin Special Events Center.

Old Dominion enjoyed nearly as large an advantage in 1983 when the Final Four was played at the Norfolk Scope in its home city of Norfolk, Virginia, but also lost its semifinal. The Scope has never been the Monarchs' regular home court. ODU has always used on-campus arenas, first the ODU Fieldhouse and since 2002 Chartway Arena. The following year, USC won the national title at Pauley Pavilion, the home court of its Los Angeles archrival UCLA.

Of the other teams to play in their home states, Stanford (1992) won the national title; Notre Dame (2011) lost in the championship game; and Western Kentucky (1986), Penn State (2000), Missouri State (2001), LSU (2004), and Baylor (2010) lost in the semifinals.

=== Championship margins ===
- Overtime games in a championship game:
  - Tennessee 70, Virginia 67/OT (1991)
  - Maryland 78, Duke 75/OT (2006)
- Smallest margin of victory in a championship game: 1 point
  - North Carolina 60, Louisiana Tech 59 (1994)
  - Baylor 82, Notre Dame 81 (2019)
  - Stanford 54, Arizona 53 (2021)
- Biggest margin of victory in a championship game: 33 points
  - UConn 93, Louisville 60 (2013)
- Margin of 10 points: Louisiana Tech (1982), Tennessee (1987 & 1989), Purdue (1999), UConn (2000, 2002, 2009, 2013, 2014, 2015, 2016 & 2025), and Baylor (2012) are teams to win every game in the tournament by 10 points or more on their way to a championship. The 2016 UConn team won every game by more than 20 points.
- Top 10 largest point differentials accumulated over the entire tournament by tournament champion. Notably, Louisiana Tech's differential is prior to the expansion of 64 teams and the addition of one more round of play.
  - 2016 UConn (+239)
  - 2010 UConn (+214)
  - 2013 UConn (+208)
  - 2015 UConn (+197)
  - 2025 UConn (+197)
  - 2000 UConn (+187)
  - 2002 UConn (+161)
  - 2019 Baylor (+159)
  - 1982 Louisiana Tech (+158)
  - 2014 UConn (+156)

=== Same-conference championship games ===
7 championship games have featured two teams from the same conference (winner listed first and bolded):

- 1989 SEC, **Tennessee** and Auburn
- 1996 SEC, **Tennessee** and Georgia
- 2006 ACC, **Maryland** and Duke
- 2009 Big East, **UConn** and Louisville
- 2013 Big East, **UConn** and Louisville
- 2017 SEC, **South Carolina** and Mississippi State
- 2021 Pac-12, **Stanford** and Arizona

== Television coverage and revenues ==
Broadcast rights to the NCAA women's basketball tournament are included in a larger package covering most NCAA Division I championships, outside of men's basketball (which is held by CBS and TNT Sports), and golf (which is held by Golf Channel). ESPN has held exclusive rights to the tournament since 1996; beginning with an 11-year, $200 million contract renewal in 2003, ESPN would televise all 63 games in the tournament on television (increasing from 23), with games in the first and second rounds airing regionally on ESPN and ESPN2. Out-of-market games were carried via pay-per-view. Coverage later expanded to include ESPN's college sports-oriented network ESPNU, and ESPN360 for streaming. In 2011, ESPN renewed this agreement through the 2023–24 season, in a deal reported to be worth $500 million in total. The deal also included rights to the men's tournament outside of the United States for ESPN International. In 2024, ESPN renewed the contract again through 2032 (aligned with the end of the media rights for the men's tournament), in an agreement valued at $920 million over eight years.

In the first two rounds, one channel (typically ESPN or ESPN2's high-definition feed) typically aired "whiparound" coverage during each window, carrying rolling coverage of all games in progress. ESPN's standard definition channels were used to broadcast games on a regional basis, while games could also be viewed in their entirety on ESPN3 or alternate channels. In 2021, ESPN adopted a broadcast arrangement similar to the men's tournament, with all games airing nationally in their entirety on either an ESPN linear channel or, for the first time, ABC. The Women's Final Four and championship remained exclusive to ESPN. Beginning in 2023, the national championship game has aired on ABC.

In data issued by the NCAA in 2021, it was stated that 15.9% of the value of the contract was allocated to the women's tournament, or approximately $6.1 million annually. In comparison, the contract for the men's tournament is valued at over $700 million annually. Amid scrutiny of inequality between the men's and women's tournaments that year, it has been suggested by critics that the structure of the NCAA's contract undervalues the media rights to the women's tournament. Based on average viewership, Emily Caron and Eben Novy-Williams of Sportico estimated that the women's tournament could fetch at least $20 million per year if its media rights were sold separately. America East Conference commissioner Amy Huchthausen argued that the ESPN contract "provides a measure of financial certainty, but it does not provide women's basketball (or any of the other sports, for that matter) an incentive to grow".

Following major media criticism of inequities between the 2021 men's and women's tournaments, the NCAA commissioned a comprehensive gender equity review of its championships by the law firm Kaplan Hecker & Fink. Among the report's findings was that U.S. television rights for the women's tournament would be worth at least $81 million annually by the time the current broadcast contract with ESPN expires in 2024 (in comparison to the $34 million value of the NCAA package as a whole).

The UCLA Bruins won the 2026 NCAA Division I women's basketball tournament, defeating South Carolina 78–74 in the final on April 5, 2026. Center Lauren Betts was named the tournament's Most Outstanding Player.

In an interview on NBC's Meet the Press on the day of the 2023 national championship, new NCAA president Charlie Baker implicated that the media rights to the women's basketball tournament may be sold separately in the next rights cycle, stating that "we do have an opportunity to put it out separately, and we're going to work really hard to make sure that those student-athletes, those schools, those programs get what I describe as what they should get." Interest in Caitlin Clark's tournament run had led to record viewership of Iowa's Women's Final Four and championship games on ESPN and ABC, respectively. The 2024 National Championship even peaked at 24 million viewers, being the first time in history that the women's final drew more viewership than the men.

Nevertheless, the NCAA renewed its existing agreements with ESPN in January 2024 under an eight-year agreement, with ESPN paying approximately $115 million per season, and the NCAA having valued the media rights to the Division I women's basketball tournament at $65 million. The agreement also includes expanded rights for ESPN to sell sponsorships (although CBS/WBD will still administer the NCAA Corporate Champion and Partner Program sponsorships per its rights to the men's tournament), and guarantees that the national championship will air on ABC annually.

== See also ==
- AIAW women's basketball tournament
- Women's Basketball Invitation Tournament
- Women's National Invitation Tournament
- Women's Basketball Invitational
- NCAA Division I men's basketball tournament
- NCAA Division II women's basketball tournament
- NCAA Division III women's basketball tournament
- NAIA women's basketball championships
