= Chloe Jackson =

American basketball player (born 1996)

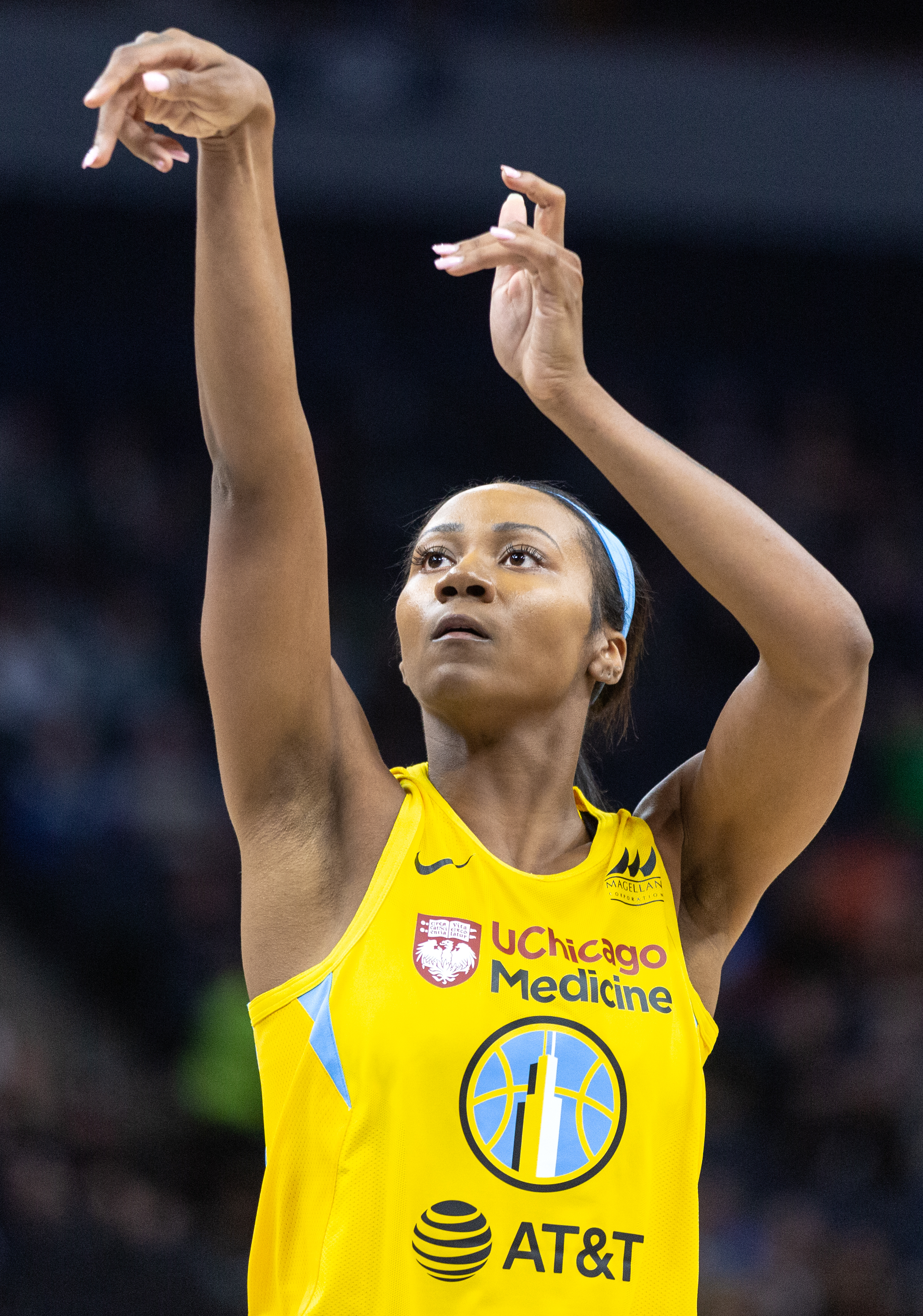
- Jackson in 2019

Free agent
- Position: Guard

Personal information
- Born: August 21, 1996 (age 29) Washington, D.C., U.S.
- Listed height: 5 ft 8 in (1.73 m)
- Listed weight: 147 lb (67 kg)

Career information
- High school: Riverdale Baptist (Upper Marlboro, Maryland)
- College: NC State (2014–2015); LSU (2016–2018); Baylor (2018–2019)
- WNBA draft: 2019: 2nd round, 15th overall pick
- Drafted by: Chicago Sky

Career history
- 2019: Chicago Sky

Career highlights
- NCAA Tournament MOP (2019)
- Stats at Basketball Reference

Chloe Jackson (born August 21, 1996) is an American college and professional basketball. A free agent, she most recently played for the Chicago Sky of the Women's National Basketball Association. She was drafted by the Sky with the 15th overall pick of the 2019 WNBA draft. She was waived by the Sky in August 2019.

Jackson is from Upper Marlboro, Maryland. Her first sport was soccer, which she began playing at age six. She attended Riverdale Baptist School, where she played basketball and soccer, though quit soccer due to the 2011 Virginia earthquake destroying fields. She had transferred schools for her sophomore year, in the summer of 2011, in order to play for a better soccer team.

Jackson began her playing career at NC State. After four games at NC, she spent two years as a substitute player due to a fractured foot. She later transferred to LSU for three years and then to Baylor. Returning to play, coach Kim Mulkey made her a point guard despite having played as a shooting guard her entire career. Regardless, she became a standout player on the team, helping the team win the 2019 National Championship and becoming the NCAA Division I basketball tournament Most Outstanding Player. In 2019, she was named Newcomer of the Year by the Waco Tribune-Herald. By the end of her college career, she had more than fifty graduate transfer offers. In 2019, she was ranked the 15th best shooting guard nationally, falling to 19th by 2021. She was named girl basketball player of the year by The Washington Post.

Besides basketball, Jackson is noted for her fashion taste. She is a stylist, with her clients including basketball player Arike Ogunbowale.

== WNBA career statistics ==
Legend
GP	Games played	GS	Games started	MPG	Minutes per game	RPG	Rebounds per game
APG	Assists per game	SPG	Steals per game	BPG	Blocks per game	PPG	Points per game
TO	Turnovers per game	FG%	Field-goal percentage	3P%	3-point field-goal percentage	FT%	Free-throw percentage
**Bold**	Career best	°	League leader

=== Regular season ===
Year	Team	GP	GS	MPG	FG%	3P%	FT%	RPG	APG	SPG	BPG	TO	PPG
2019	Chicago	8	0	4.0	.222	.000	.167	0.8	0.5	0.6	0.0	0.8	0.6
Career	1 years, 1 team	8	0	4.0	.222	.000	.167	0.8	0.5	0.6	0.0	0.8	0.6

== College statistics ==
Legend
GP	Games played	GS	Games started	MPG	Minutes per game
FG%	Field goal percentage	3P%	3-point field goal percentage	FT%	Free throw percentage
RPG	Rebounds per game	APG	Assists per game	SPG	Steals per game
BPG	Blocks per game	PPG	Points per game	**Bold**	Career high

†	Denotes seasons in which Baylor won the Big 12 championship

Year	Team	GP	Points	FG%	3P%	FT%	RPG	APG	SPG	BPG	PPG
2014–15	NC State	4	5	15.4	–	20.0	2.5	0.25	0.75	–	1.25
2016–17	LSU	32	418	41.4	**30.6**	69.8	**5.1**	2.1	1.8	0.3	13.06
2017–18	LSU	29	**526**	43.6	27.0	**77.6**	4.7	2.3	**2.0**	0.4	**18.14**
2018–19†	Baylor	**38**	444	**47.3**	20.0	73.9	3.7	**5.1**	1.6	0.4	11.68
Career	All	103	1298	43.8	27.4	73.1	4.4	3.3	1.8	0.4	13.5
