= 2019 NCAA Division I women's basketball championship game =

Women's college basketball championship game

2019 NCAA Tournament Championship Game
National championship game
Notre Dame Fighting Irish	Baylor Lady Bears
ACC	Big 12
(35–3)	(36–1)
81	82
Head coach: Muffet McGraw	Head coach: Kim Mulkey
- AP: 3
- Coaches: 3
- AP: 1
- Coaches: 1
	1	2	3	4	Total
Notre Dame Fighting Irish	14	17	24	26	81
Baylor Lady Bears	25	18	23	16	82
- Date: April 7, 2019
- Venue: Amalie Arena, Tampa, Florida
- MVP: Chloe Jackson, Baylor
- Favorite: Baylor by 3.5

United States TV coverage
- Network: ESPN
- Announcers: Adam Amin (play-by-play); Kara Lawson (analyst); Rebecca Lobo (analyst); Holly Rowe (sideline)
- Nielsen Ratings: 0.75 (3.69 million)

The 2019 NCAA Division I women's basketball championship game was the final game of the 2019 NCAA Division I women's basketball tournament. It determined the national champion for the 2018–19 NCAA Division I women's basketball season. The game was played on April 7, 2019, at the Amalie Arena in Tampa, Florida, between Notre Dame and Baylor. Baylor won its third NCAA Championship, defeating the Fighting Irish, 82-81.

== Participants ==
=== Notre Dame ===
Notre Dame, led by 32nd-year head coach Muffet McGraw, finished the regular season with a record of 27–3. They posted a 14–3 conference record, earning them the No. 1 seed in the ACC tournament, where they defeated No. 8 seed North Carolina, No. 5 seed Syracuse, and No. 2 seed Louisville en route to a conference championship. In the NCAA Tournament, the Fighting Irish received a No. 1 seed in the Chicago Regional. They defeated No. 16 seed Bethune–Cookman and No. 9 seed Michigan State to reach the Sweet Sixteen, where they beat No. 4 seed Texas A&M. They then advanced to the Elite Eight, where they won the Regional by defeating No. 2 seed Stanford. This win put the Fighting Irish in the Final Four, where they beat the Albany Regional champions, No. 2 seed Connecticut, to reach the national championship.

Two Notre Dame players were selected to the Chicago Regional all tournament team: Arike Ogunbowale and Jessica Shepard.

=== Baylor ===
Baylor, led by 18th-year head coach Kim Mulkey, finished the regular season with a record of 28–1. They posted a 18–0 conference record, earning them the No. 1 seed in the Big 12 Tournament, where they defeated No. 9 seed Texas Tech, No. 5 seed Kansas State, and No. 2 seed Iowa State en route to a conference championship. In the NCAA Tournament, the Lady Bears received a No. 1 seed in the Greensboro Regional. They defeated No. 16 seed Abilene Christian and No. 8 seed California to reach the Sweet Sixteen, where they easily beat No. 4 seed South Carolina. In the Elite Eight, the Lady Bears became Greensboro Regional champions by beating No. 2 seed Iowa, which they did by 32 points. In the Final Four, Baylor was matched up with the Portland Regional champions, No. 2 seed Oregon, whom they defeated by five to reach the national championship.

Four Baylor players were selected to the Greensboro Regional all tournament team: Lauren Cox, DiDi Richards, Chloe Jackson, and Kalani Brown.

== Starting lineups ==
Notre Dame	Position		Baylor
Jessica Shepard	F		Lauren Cox
Arike Ogunbowale	G		Juicy Landrum
Jackie Young	G		DiDi Richards
Marina Mabrey	G		Chloe Jackson
Brianna Turner	F	C	Kalani Brown

== Game summary ==
ESPN

April 7, 2019
6:00 pm EDT

Box Score

#1 Notre Dame Fighting Irish 81, #1 Baylor Lady Bears 82
Scoring by quarter: 14–25, 17–18, 24–23, 26–16
Pts: A. Ogunbowale – 31; Rebs: B. Turner – 12; Asts: J. Young – 6 Stls: A. Ogunbowale – 2	Pts: C. Jackson – 26; Rebs: K. Brown – 13; Asts: J. Landrum, D. Richards – 6 Stls: D. Richards, C. Jackson – 2

Amalie Arena – Tampa, Florida
Attendance: 20,127
Referees: Dee Kantner, Brenda Pantoja, Maj Forsberg

== Media coverage ==
The Championship Game was televised in the United States by ESPN.

== See also ==
- 2019 NCAA Division I men's basketball championship game
- 2019 NCAA Division I women's basketball tournament
