= Louisiana Tech Lady Techsters basketball =

Women's college basketball team

Louisiana Tech Lady Techsters
2026–27 Louisiana Tech Lady Techsters basketball team
- University: Louisiana Tech University
- First season: 1974–75
- Head coach: Brooke Stoehr (11th season)
- Location: Ruston, Louisiana
- Arena: Thomas Assembly Center (capacity: 8,000)
- Conference: Sun Belt
- Nickname: Lady Techsters
- Colors: Columbia blue and red
- All-time record: 1251–429 (.745)

NCAA Division I tournament champions
- 1982, 1988
Other NCAA Division I tournament results
Runner-up	1983, 1987, 1994, 1998
Final Four	1982, 1983, 1984, 1987, 1988, 1989, 1990, 1994, 1998, 1999
Elite Eight	1982, 1983, 1984, 1985, 1986, 1987, 1988, 1989, 1990, 1993, 1994, 1996, 1998, 1999, 2000, 2001
Sweet Sixteen	1982, 1983, 1984, 1985, 1986, 1987, 1988, 1989, 1990, 1993, 1994, 1995, 1996, 1997, 1998, 1999, 2000, 2001, 2003, 2004
Appearances	1982, 1983, 1984, 1985, 1986, 1987, 1988, 1989, 1990, 1991, 1992, 1993, 1994, 1995, 1996, 1997, 1998, 1999, 2000, 2001, 2002, 2003, 2004, 2005, 2006, 2010, 2011

AIAW tournament champions
- 1981
Other AIAW tournament results
Runner-up	1979
Final Four	1979, 1980, 1981
Quarterfinals	1979, 1980, 1981
Second round	1979, 1980, 1981
Appearances	1979, 1980, 1981

Conference tournament champions
- American South: 1988, 1989, 1990, 1991; Sun Belt: 1994, 1996, 1997, 1998, 1999, 2000, 2001; WAC: 2002, 2003, 2004, 2006, 2010

Conference regular-season champions
- American South: 1988, 1989, 1990; Sun Belt: 1993, 1994, 1995, 1996, 1997, 1998, 1999, 2000, 2001; WAC: 2002, 2003, 2004, 2005, 2006, 2007, 2009, 2011; CUSA: 2026

Conference division champions
- C-USA: 2022

Uniforms
Home	Away	Alternate

The Louisiana Tech Lady Techsters basketball team represents Louisiana Tech University in Ruston, Louisiana. The team currently competes in the Sun Belt Conference. The current head coach of the Lady Techsters is Brooke Stoehr. Louisiana Tech has won three National Championships and has competed in 13 Final Fours, 23 Sweet Sixteens, and 27 NCAA tournaments. The Lady Techsters basketball program boasts three Wade Trophy winners, five Olympic medalists, eight members of the Women's Basketball Hall of Fame, 16 All-Americans, and 21 WNBA players. The Lady Techsters have an all-time record of 1251–429, with a .745 winning percentage, and are the fifth program in NCAA history to reach 1,200 wins. The Lady Techsters have made 27 appearances in the NCAA Division I women's basketball tournament, which is the twelfth most all-time.

== History ==
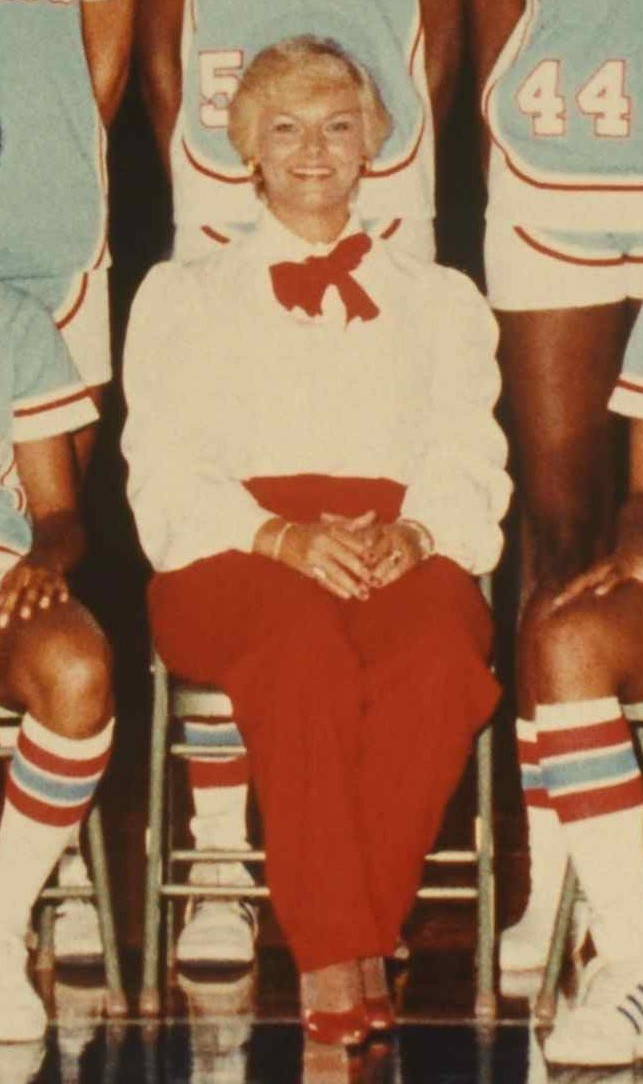
Sonja Hogg

=== Sonja Hogg Era (1974–1982) ===
In 1974, Louisiana Tech President F. Jay Taylor established the university's first women's athletic program, a women's basketball team. He hired a 28-year-old P.E. teacher at Ruston High School, Sonja Hogg, as the program's first head coach. Following 13- and 19-win seasons in 1974 and 1975, she never won less than 20 games in a season for the rest of her time at Louisiana Tech. The late 70s and early 80s saw much success, with Hogg leading the Lady Techsters to 4 straight Final Four appearances from 1978 to 1981, including 2 national championships in 1980 and 1981.

=== Hogg-Barmore Era (1982–1985) ===
Leon Barmore joined the Lady Techster staff in 1977 as an assistant, quickly moving up the ranks. After becoming Associate Head Coach in 1980, he was named co-head coach in 1982. With this duo leading, Tech saw continued dominance, including 3 straight trips to the NCAA tournament, 2 Final Four appearances, and 1 appearance in the final match. Following the 1985 season, Hogg left to coach at Deer Park High School, leaving Barmore solely in charge of the program.

The 1982 championship team finally received championship rings in 2017.

=== Leon Barmore Era (1985–2002) ===
Following Sonja Hogg's departure, Leon Barmore once again continued the dominance of previous years. During 16 years as the sole head coach, Barmore coached the Techsters to the NCAA tournament every season, 7 Final Four appearances, 4 more trips to the final round, and 1 additional national title during the 1987–1988 season. He also successfully navigated the Techsters through conference moves to the American South, Sun Belt, and WAC; winning 13 regular-season conference titles. Retiring after the 2001 season, Barmore had earned a coaching record of 576 wins and 87 losses, good for a win percentage of .869 and the 2nd best in basketball history. He has been inducted into both the Basketball Hall of Fame and the Women's Basketball Hall of Fame.

=== Kurt Budke Era (2002–2005) ===
After Barmore's retirement, Kurt Budke was named as head coach of the Lady Techsters. Budke had served as an associate head coach under Barmore since 2000 and had previously coached successfully in the NJCAA. In his 3 years as head coach, the Techsters earned 3 regular season conference titles, 2 conference tournament titles, 3 NCAA tournament appearances, and 2 Sweet Sixteen appearances. Following the 2004–2005 season, Budke was hired by Oklahoma State to fill the same position. He left Ruston with an 80–16 record.

=== Chris Long Era (2005–2009) ===
Chris Long, another assistant who had been on staff under Barmore, was named as the 4th Lady Techsters head coach in 2005. While he started his tenure continuing the dominance of previous coaches, including 2 regular season conference titles and 1 NCAA tournament appearance, he was fired halfway into the 2008–2009 season after a 12–11 start. This followed a 16–15 season in 2007–2008 where Tech failed to play in the postseason for the second season in a row. He left the Techsters with a 71–44 record.

=== Teresa Weatherspoon Era (2009–2014) ===
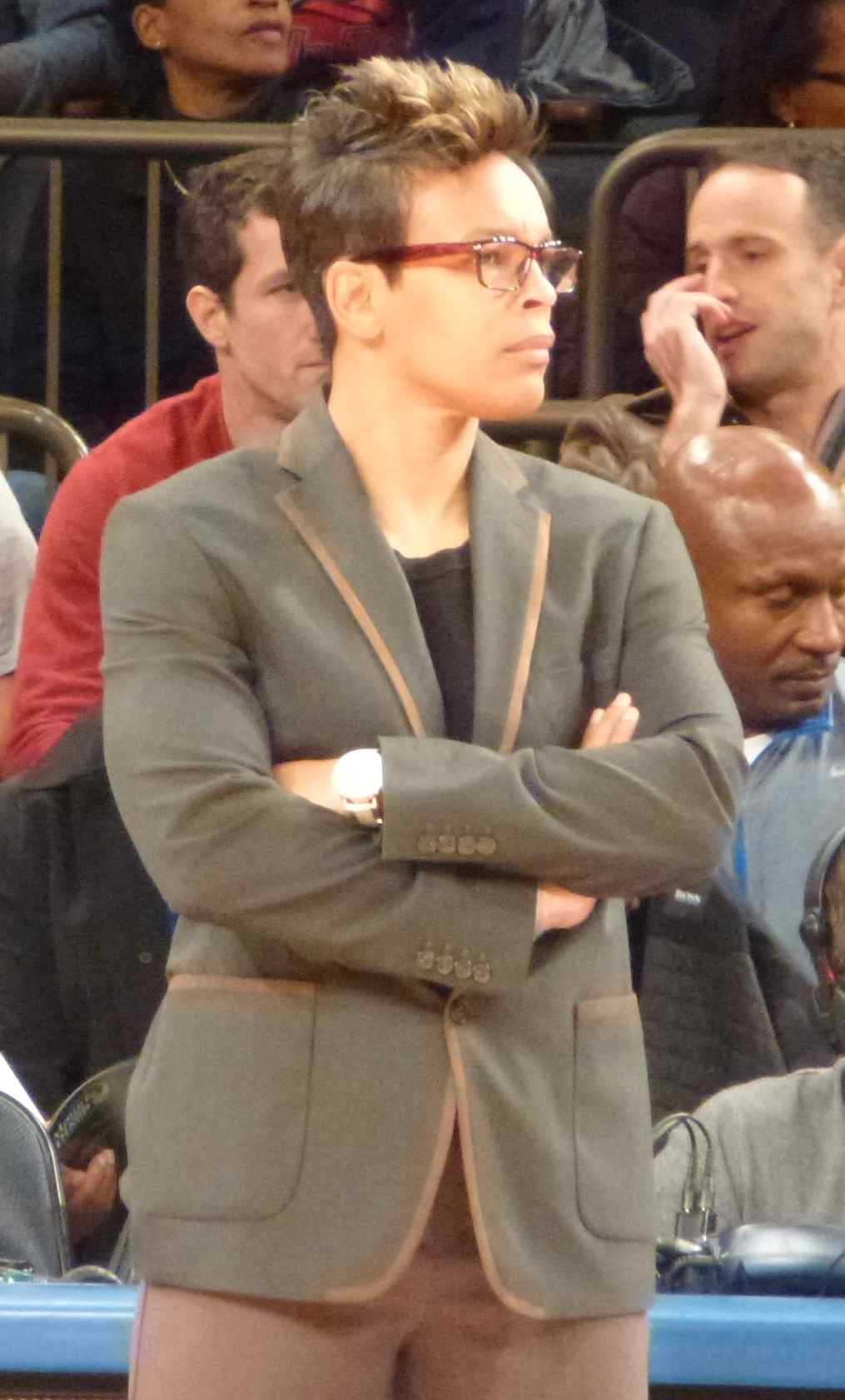
Teresa Weatherspoon

After Chris Long was fired midway into the 2008–2009 season, Teresa Weatherspoon was named Interim head coach, later becoming the 5th head coach of the Lady Techsters. Previously, she had played under Sonja Hogg and Leon Barmore from 1984 to 1988 and had been an associate head coach at Louisiana Tech since 2008. As head coach, she led the Techsters to 2 regular season conference titles, 1 conference tournament title in 2009–2010, and 2 NCAA tournament appearances. Following Louisiana Tech's move from the WAC to Conference USA in 2013, Weatherspoon was fired after a 12–20 season where the Lady Techsters finished last in the conference.

=== Tyler Summitt Era (2014–2016) ===
Tyler Summitt was hired in 2014 following Teresa Weatherspoon's firing. Previously he served as an assistant coach at Marquette from 2012 to 2014. Summitt gathered a 30–31 record during his tenure in Ruston. His time as head coach was marked by scandal, however, as news broke that he was involved in an extramarital affair with Brooke Pumroy, a player who had transferred from Marquette along with Summitt. After this affair was leaked, Summitt resigned on April 7, 2016. Associate head coach and former Louisiana Tech player, Mickie DeMoss, was named as interim head coach for the remainder of the 2015–16 season.

=== Brooke Stoehr Era (since 2016) ===
Brooke Stoehr was hired to be the next head coach of the Lady Techsters following Tyler Summitt's resignation in April 2016. Previously, she coached for 4 seasons at Northwestern State. Before that, she played at Tech for 4 seasons from 1998 to 2002 under Leon Barmore. Currently, in her ninth season as head coach, she has led the Techsters to 5 WNIT bids, and 1 division regular season conference title.

== Conference affiliations ==
- 1974–1987: Independent
- 1987–1991: American South Conference
- 1991–2001: Sun Belt Conference
- 2001–2013: Western Athletic Conference
- 2013–2026: Conference USA
- 2026–present: Sun Belt Conference

== Seasons ==
Record table
Season	Coach	Overall	Conference	Standing	Postseason
Sonja Hogg (Independent) (1974–1982)
1974–75	Sonja Hogg	13–9			AIAW State
1975–76	Sonja Hogg	19–10			AIAW State
1976–77	Sonja Hogg	22–9			AIAW Region 4
1977–78	Sonja Hogg	20–8			AIAW Region 4
1978–79	Sonja Hogg	34–4			AIAW Finalists
1979–80	Sonja Hogg	40–5			AIAW Final Four
1980–81	Sonja Hogg	34–0			AIAW Champions
1981–82	Sonja Hogg	35–1			NCAA Champions
Sonja Hogg/Leon Barmore (Independent) (1982–1985)
1982–83	Hogg/Barmore	31–2			NCAA Finalists
1983–84	Hogg/Barmore	30–3			NCAA Final Four
1984–85	Hogg/Barmore	29–4			NCAA Elite Eight
Sonja Hogg:		307–55 (.848)			
Leon Barmore (Independent) (1985–1987)
1985–86	Leon Barmore	27–5			NCAA Elite Eight
1986–87	Leon Barmore	30–3			NCAA Finalists
Leon Barmore (American South Conference) (1987–1991)
1987–88	Leon Barmore	32–2	5–0	1st	NCAA Champions
1988–89	Leon Barmore	24–6	13–2	1st	NCAA Final Four
1989–90	Leon Barmore	25–6	14–2	1st	NCAA Final Four
1990–91	Leon Barmore	29–5	14–2	2nd	NCAA First Round
Leon Barmore (Sun Belt Conference) (1991–2001)
1991–92	Leon Barmore	20–10	12–4	T–3rd	NCAA 1st Round
1992–93	Leon Barmore	26–6	13–1	T–1st	NCAA Elite Eight
1993–94	Leon Barmore	31–4	14–0	1st	NCAA Finalist
1994–95	Leon Barmore	28–5	13–1	1st	NCAA Sweet Sixteen
1995–96	Leon Barmore	31–2	14–0	1st	NCAA Elite Eight
1996–97	Leon Barmore	31–4	12–2	T–1st	NCAA Sweet Sixteen
1997–98	Leon Barmore	31–4	13–1	1st	NCAA Finalists
1998–99	Leon Barmore	30–3	12–0	T–1st	NCAA Final Four
1999–00	Leon Barmore	31–3	16–0	1st	NCAA Elite Eight
2000–01	Leon Barmore	31–5	16–0	1st	NCAA Elite Eight
Leon Barmore (WAC) (2001–2002)
2001–02	Leon Barmore	25–5	17–1	1st	NCAA First Round
Leon Barmore:		576–87 (.869)	186–13 (.935)		
Kurt Budke (WAC) (2002–2005)
2002–03	Kurt Budke	31–3	18–0	1st	NCAA Sweet Sixteen
2003–04	Kurt Budke	29–3	17–1	1st	NCAA Sweet Sixteen
2004–05	Kurt Budke	20–10	14–4	T–1st	NCAA First Round
Kurt Budke:		80–16 (.833)	49–5 (.907)		
Chris Long (WAC) (2005–2008)
2005–06	Chris Long	26–5	15–1	1st	NCAA First Round
2006–07	Chris Long	17–13	12–4	T–1st	Declined WNIT Bid
2007–08	Chris Long	16–15	9–7	T–4th	
Chris Long/Teresa Weatherspoon (WAC) (2008–2009)
2008–09	Long/Weatherspoon	21–13	12–4	T–1st	WNIT Round 2
Chris Long:		71–44 (.617)	40–16 (.714)		
Teresa Weatherspoon (WAC) (2009–2013)
2009–10	Teresa Weatherspoon	23–9	11–5	2nd	NCAA First Round
2010–11	Teresa Weatherspoon	24–8	15–1	1st	NCAA First Round
2011–12	Teresa Weatherspoon	17–15	8–6	3rd	
2012–13	Teresa Weatherspoon	14–17	9–9	5th	
Teresa Weatherspoon (Conference USA) (2013–2014)
2013–14	Teresa Weatherspoon	12–20	5–11	14th	
Teresa Weatherspoon:		99–71 (.582)	56–32 (.636)		
Tyler Summitt (Conference USA) (2014–2016)
2014–15	Tyler Summitt	16–15	10–8	T–7th	
2015–16	Tyler Summitt	14–16	9–9	7th	
Tyler Summitt:		30–31 (.492)	14–16 (.467)		
Brooke Stoehr (Conference USA) (2016–present)
2016–17	Brooke Stoehr	18–14	12–6	T–4th	WNIT Round 1
2017–18	Brooke Stoehr	19–12	10–6	T–3rd	WNIT Round 1
2018–19	Brooke Stoehr	14–16	6–10	10th	
2019–20	Brooke Stoehr	15-15	6–12	T–11th	
2020–21	Brooke Stoehr	14–10	8–8	4th West	
2021–22	Brooke Stoehr	21–12	11–7	1st West	WNIT Round 1
2022–23	Brooke Stoehr	19–13	12–8	5th	WNIT Round 1
2023–24	Brooke Stoehr	14–19	7–9	4th	
2024–25	Brooke Stoehr	18–16	8–10	5th	WNIT Great 8
2025–26	Brooke Stoehr	26–7	17–1	1st	WBIT First Round
Brooke Stoehr:		178–134 (.571)	97–77 (.557)		
Total:		1251–429 (.745)			
National champion Postseason invitational champion Conference regular season champion Conference regular season and conference tournament champion Division regular season champion Division regular season and conference tournament champion Conference tournament champion

== Postseason results ==
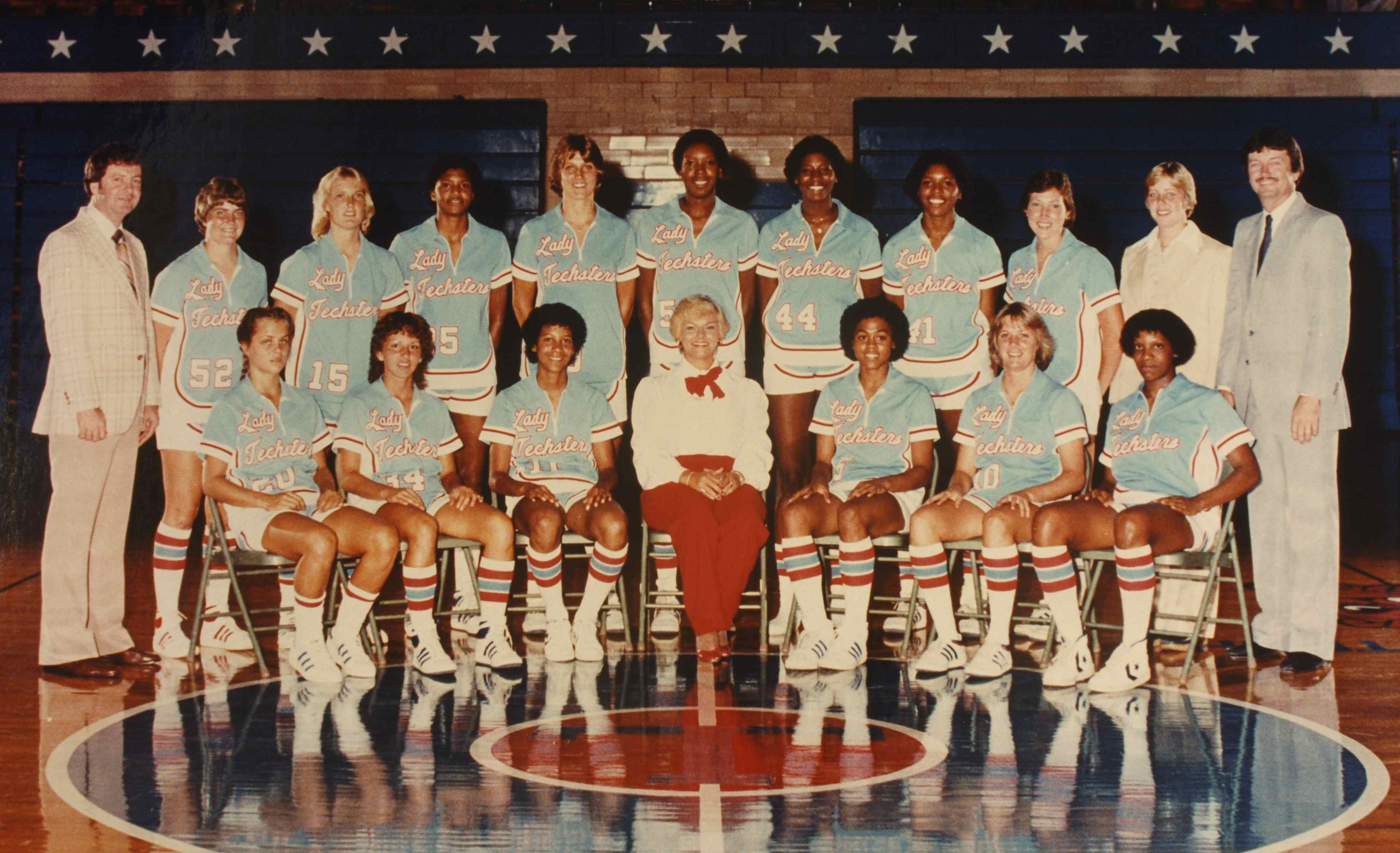
1982 Louisiana Tech women's basketball team with coaches Leon Barmore, Sonja Hogg and Gary Blair (L to R)

=== AIAW Division I ===
The Lady Techsters made three appearances in the AIAW women's basketball tournament, with a combined record of 9–3.

Year	Round	Opponent	Result
1979	First Round; Quarterfinals; Semifinals; National Championship	Kansas; Northwestern; Tennessee; Old Dominion	W, 100–61; W, 88–52; W, 102–84; L, 65–75
1980	Second Round; Quarterfinals; Semifinals; Third Place Game	Kansas; Long Beach State; Old Dominion; South Carolina	W, 81–73; W, 96–70; L, 59–73; L, 69–77
1981	First Round; Quarterfinals; Semifinals; National Championship	Jackson State; UCLA; USC; Tennessee	W, 97–50; W, 87–54; W, 66–50; W, 79–59

=== NCAA Division I ===
Louisiana Tech has been to the NCAA Division I women's basketball tournament 27 times. They have a record of 65–25.

Year	Seed	Round	Opponent	Result
1982	#1	First Round; Sweet Sixteen; Elite Eight; Final Four; Title Game	#8 Tennessee Tech #4 Arizona State #2 Kentucky #2 Tennessee #2 Cheyney	W 114–53; W 92–54; W 82–60; W 69–46; W 76–62
1983	#1	First Round; Sweet Sixteen; Elite Eight; Final Four; Title Game	#8 Middle Tennessee #5 Auburn #2 Texas #2 Old Dominion #1 USC	W 91–59; W 81–54; W 72–58; W 71–55; L 67–69
1984	#1	First Round; Sweet Sixteen; Elite Eight; Final Four	#8 Texas Tech #5 LSU #2 Texas #1 USC	W 94–68; W 92–67; W 85–60; L 57–62
1985	#1	First Round; Sweet Sixteen; Elite Eight	#8 Illinois State #5 San Diego State #2 Northeast Louisiana	W 81–57; W 94–64; L 76–85
1986	#2	Second Round; Sweet Sixteen; Elite Eight	#7 Washington #3 Long Beach State #1 USC	W 79–54; W 71–69; L 64–80
1987	#1	Second Round; Sweet Sixteen; Elite Eight; Final Four; Title Game	#8 Northwestern #5 Southern Illinois #3 Iowa #1 Texas #2 Tennessee	W 82–60; W 66–53; W 66–65; W 79–75; L 44–67
1988	#2	Second Round; Sweet Sixteen; Elite Eight; Final Four; Title Game	#7 Kansas #3 Ole Miss #1 Texas #1 Tennessee #1 Auburn	W 89–50; W 80–60; W 83–80; W 68–59; W 56–54
1989	#1	Second Round; Sweet Sixteen; Elite Eight; Final Four	#9 Oklahoma State #4 LSU #2 Stanford #1 Auburn	W 103–78; W 85–68; W 85–75; L 71–76
1990	#1	Second Round; Sweet Sixteen; Elite Eight; Final Four	#8 Southern Miss #4 Purdue #3 Texas #2 Auburn	W 89–70; W 91–47; W 71–57; L 69–81
1991	#10	First Round	#7 Cal State Fullerton	L 80–84
1992	#6	First Round	#11 Northern Illinois	L 71–77 (OT)
1993	#6	First Round; Second Round; Sweet Sixteen; Elite Eight	#11 DePaul #3 Texas #7 Southwest Missouri State #1 Vanderbilt	W 70–59; W 82–78; W 59–43; L 53–58
1994	#4	First Round; Second Round; Sweet Sixteen; Elite Eight; Final Four; Title Game	#13 SMU #6 Ole Miss #1 Tennessee #2 USC #6 Alabama #3 North Carolina	W 96–62; W 82–67; W 71–68; W 75–66; W 69–66; L 59–60
1995	#2	First Round; Second Round; Sweet Sixteen	#15 Furman #7 Oklahoma #3 Virginia	W 90–52; W 48–36; L 62–63
1996	#1	First Round; Second Round; Sweet Sixteen; Elite Eight	#16 UCF #9 Southern Miss #4 Texas Tech #2 Georgia	W 98–41; W 84–46; W 66–55; L 76–90
1997	#2	First Round; Second Round; Sweet Sixteen	#15 Saint Peter's #7 Auburn #3 Florida	W 94–50; W 74–48; L 57–71
1998	#3	First Round; Second Round; Sweet Sixteen; Elite Eight; Final Four; Title Game	#14 Holy Cross #6 Clemson #2 Alabama #4 Purdue #4 NC State #1 Tennessee	W 86–58; W 74–52; W 71–57; W 72–65; W 84–65; L 75–93
1999	#1	First Round; Second Round; Sweet Sixteen; Elite Eight; Final Four	#16 UCF #8 Penn State #4 LSU #3 UCLA #1 Purdue	W 90–48; W 79–62; W 73–52; W 88–62; L 63–77
2000	#1	First Round; Second Round; Sweet Sixteen; Elite Eight	#16 Alcorn State #9 Vanderbilt #4 Old Dominion #2 Penn State	W 95–53; W 66–65; W 86–74; L 65–86
2001	#3	First Round; Second Round; Sweet Sixteen; Elite Eight	#14 Georgia State #11 TCU #10 Missouri #1 Connecticut	W 84–48; W 80–59; W 78–67; L 48–67
2002	#5	First Round	#12 UC Santa Barbara	L 56–57
2003	#5	First Round; Second Round; Sweet Sixteen	#12 Pepperdine #4 Ohio State #1 LSU	W 94–60; W 74–61; L 63–69
2004	#5	First Round; Second Round; Sweet Sixteen	#12 Montana #4 Texas Tech #1 Duke	W 81–77; W 81–64; L 49–63
2005	#11	First Round	#6 Temple	L 61–66
2006	#11	First Round	#6 Florida State	L 71–80
2010	#14	First Round	#3 Florida State	L 61–75
2011	#10	First Round	#7 Rutgers	L 51–76

== Rivalries ==
=== Fresno State Bulldogs ===
Louisiana Tech–Fresno State: All-Time Record
Games played	First meeting	Last meeting	La Tech wins	La Tech losses	Win %
29	November 24, 1995 (won 77–59)	March 10, 2012 (lost 61–89)	17	12	58.6%

=== LSU Lady Tigers ===
Louisiana Tech–LSU: All-Time Record
Games played	First meeting	Last meeting	La Tech wins	La Tech losses	Win %
29	January 24, 1975 (won 97–83)	November 11, 2016 (lost 73–77)	14	17	45.2%

=== Tennessee Lady Vols ===
Louisiana Tech–Tennessee: All-Time Record
Games played	First meeting	Last meeting	La Tech wins	La Tech losses	Win %
41	December 16, 1978 (won 64–56)	November 23, 2008 (lost 59–94)	17	24	41.5%

=== WKU Lady Toppers ===
Louisiana Tech–WKU: All-Time Record
Games played	First meeting	Last meeting	La Tech wins	La Tech losses	Win %
53	December 3, 1983 (won 82–50)	February 23, 2023 (won 70–65)	28	25	52.83%

== Home venues ==
=== Thomas Assembly Center ===
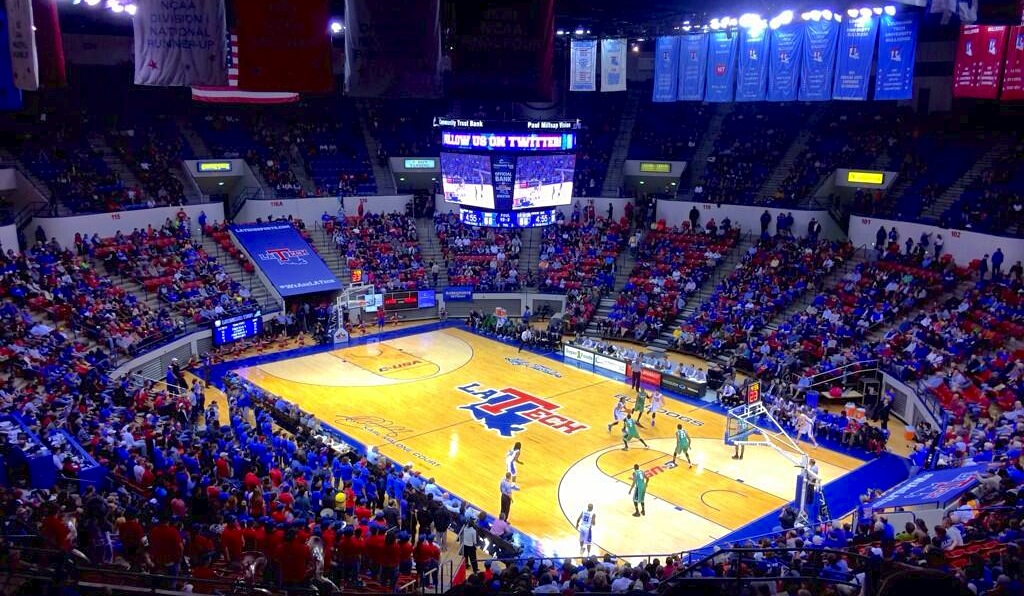
Thomas Assembly Center

The Thomas Assembly Center (TAC) has been home to the Lady Techsters basketball team since the 8,000-seat facility opened in November 1982. Constructed at a cost of $17.5 million, the TAC is a cylindrical arena with a concrete finish and bronze glass at the entrance level. In 2007 a new state-of-the-art maple wood floor was installed in the TAC and named "Karl Malone Court".

In the Lady Techsters' first game at the TAC, Louisiana Tech lost to USC, led by Cheryl Miller and Cynthia Cooper, 64–58 in front of 8,700 fans on December 4, 1982. However, the Lady Techsters picked up their first win at the TAC in their next game by defeating Alabama 83–56 on December 9, 1982.

On January 22, 1985, Louisiana Tech set an attendance record of 8,975 at the TAC in a women's/men's doubleheader in which the Lady Techsters defeated Northeast Louisiana 79–77 in overtime. The Lady Techsters have hosted 15 crowds of more than 7,000 and eight capacity crowds of more than 8,000. The Lady Techsters regularly rank in the Top 40 in NCAA women's basketball average attendance, including a program record average of 5,330 in 1983–84.

The Lady Techsters have been almost unbeatable at the TAC. As of the 2023–24 season, the Lady Techsters boast a 537–109 record at the TAC, an 83.13% winning percentage. The Lady Techsters have recorded thirteen undefeated seasons at the TAC, and is a perfect 36–0 all-time in NCAA tournament games there. The Lady Techsters won 161 consecutive games against unranked opponents at home from 1992 to 2004, and the Lady Techsters won 114 consecutive regular season home conference games between 1992 and 2007; and have posted home winning streaks of 49, 52 and 62 games, all of which rank in the Top 15 in Division I history.

=== Memorial Gymnasium ===
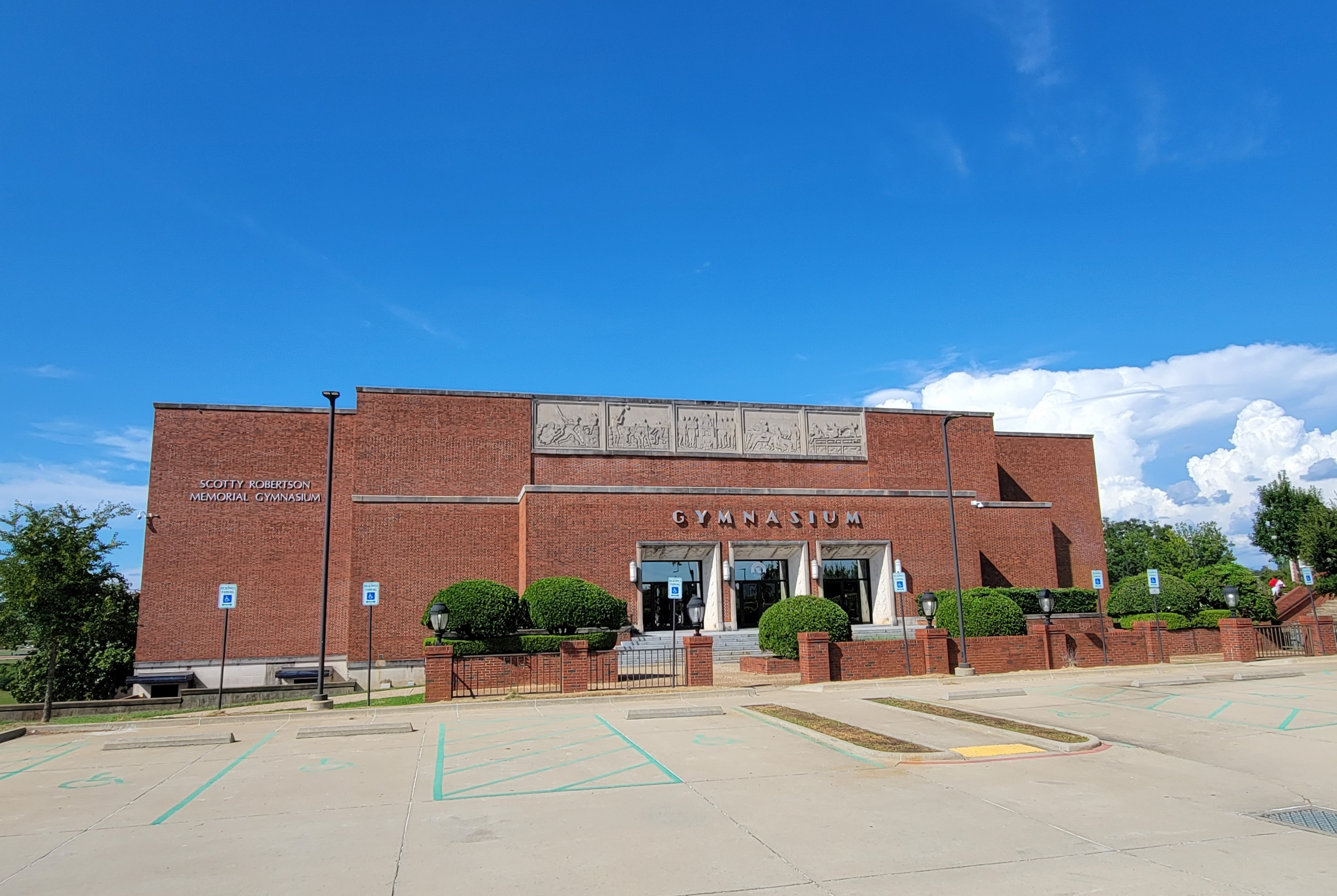
Memorial Gymnasium

In 1952, Memorial Gymnasium, now Scotty Robertson Memorial Gymnasium, was constructed on the Louisiana Tech University campus in Ruston to serve as the home of the Louisiana Tech Bulldogs basketball. After the inception of the Lady Techsters basketball team in 1974, Memorial Gymnasium was home to Lady Techster basketball through the 1981–82 season. In the first game in program history, the Lady Techsters lost to Southeastern Louisiana 55–59 in Memorial Gym on January 7, 1975. However, in their next game, the Lady Techsters rebounded to defeat LSU 97–83 to christen Memorial Gym with the first victory in Louisiana Tech women's basketball history on January 24, 1975.

During the 1979–80 season, more than 5,000 fans routinely packed inside Memorial Gym to watch the Lady Techsters play, and Louisiana Tech's attendance peaked at 6,220 for UCLA and 6,314 for Stephen F. Austin. After that season, the Louisiana State Fire Marshall ordered Louisiana Tech to not allow more than 5,200 spectators into Memorial Gym again. If Louisiana Tech did not comply, the fire marshal vowed to personally count the crowd and not let more than 4,800 enter Memorial Gym again. As a result, Louisiana Tech President F. Jay Taylor initiated the construction of the 8,000 capacity Thomas Assembly Center.

In the Lady Techsters' final game played in Memorial Gym, Louisiana Tech defeated Kentucky 82–60 on March 20, 1982, in the Midwest regional final of the first NCAA Division I women's basketball tournament. Throughout the eight seasons the Lady Techsters played in Memorial Gymnasium, Louisiana Tech amassed 84 wins and only 6 losses at home. The Lady Techsters' 93.3% winning percentage at Memorial Gym ranks third best all-time only trailing Tennessee at Thompson–Boling Arena (94.2%) and Connecticut at Gampel Pavilion (93.7%).

== Traditions ==
=== Lady Techsters ===
I just didn't want us to be the Lady Bulldogs. I could hear people saying, "There comes Coach Hogg and all of her little b!+¢#ə$."

— Former head coach Sonja Hogg on the Lady Techsters nickname in 2009

When Sonja Hogg was hired in 1974 as the first women's basketball coach, she refused to call her team the Lady Bulldogs after the Louisiana Tech men's nickname. She asserted that bulldogs were "unfeminine" and that "a lady dog is a b!+¢#." For that reason, her first initiative as head coach was to nix the nickname Bulldogs from any connection with her team. Thus, Hogg decided to change her team's nickname to the Lady Techsters.

Hogg would not allow her Lady Techsters to wear knee or elbow pads because they were unladylike. A 1986 Sports Illustrated article stated, "A Lady Techster is likely to be a good student and a devout Christian, probably favors needlepoint over Madonna tapes on airplanes and fears a drug test about as much as she does an airport metal detector." The same article stated that Hogg's insistence that her players act like ladies gave the team an "almost antebellum image" that was well-suited to a conservative town like Ruston.

=== Columbia Blue ===
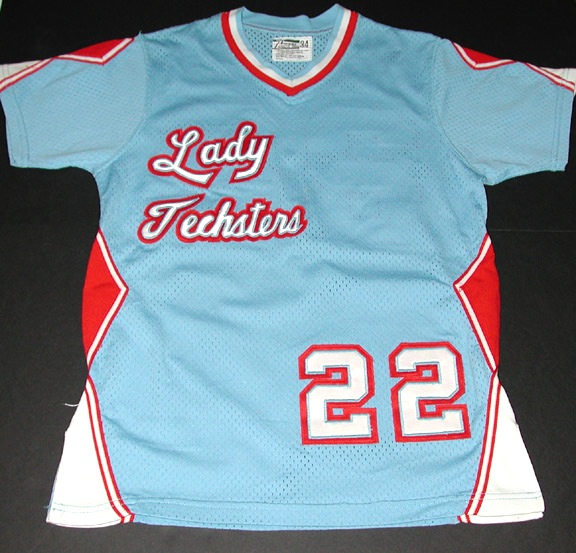
Columbia blue Lady Techster jersey with sleeves

In 1896, Col. A.T. Prescott, president of what was then Louisiana Polytechnic Institute, announced the selection of red and blue as the institution's colors. Red was chosen to represent courage, and blue was selected to embody loyalty. In the 1960s, Columbia blue was introduced to Louisiana Tech in various applications. In 1974, Sonja Hogg, along with the head of the university's art department, Raymond Nichols, presented various shades of blue to the athletics council, and Hogg's preference of Columbia blue was adopted as the primary color of the Lady Techsters. Prior to 2003, the university's teams, departments, and organizations used various shades of blue ranging from light blue to dark blue. Yet in 2003, Louisiana Tech standardized its shade of blue by adopting reflex blue as the official hue. However, due to Louisiana Tech's rich tradition in women's basketball, the Lady Techsters basketball team was granted the only exemption to not adopt reflex blue and was allowed to continue to use the traditional Columbia blue. While other teams have since used Columbia blue in limited capacity, the shade is still mostly synonymous with the women's basketball team.

=== Jersey Sleeves ===
In 1974, Sonja Hogg designed the Lady Techster jerseys with modest sleeves to avoid her players showing sports bra straps (or before their invention, regular bra straps) or underarms. As Lady Techster basketball rose to national prominence, the jersey sleeves became recognized as part of the Lady Techster brand. Sleeves remained a staple of the Lady Techsters jerseys throughout Leon Barmore's tenure as head coach. After Barmore retired in 2002, new head coach Kurt Budke introduced the first Lady Techsters sleeveless jerseys at the behest of the players.

=== Hoop Troop ===
Hoop Troop is the official basketball pep band at Louisiana Tech University. The Hoop Troop performs at most women's basketball home games and travels to select road basketball games. The band also usually travels to all post-season games played by the Lady Techsters, and is known nationally as one of the best basketball bands in college basketball. In the 2005 post-season, the Hoop Troop was featured in a Sports Illustrated's College Edition article, "65 Things We Want to See During March Madness" in which states, "30) The Louisiana Tech pep band, a.k.a. the Hoop Troop, the funniest band in the land." The Hoop Troop was the only basketball band to be listed.

== Players ==
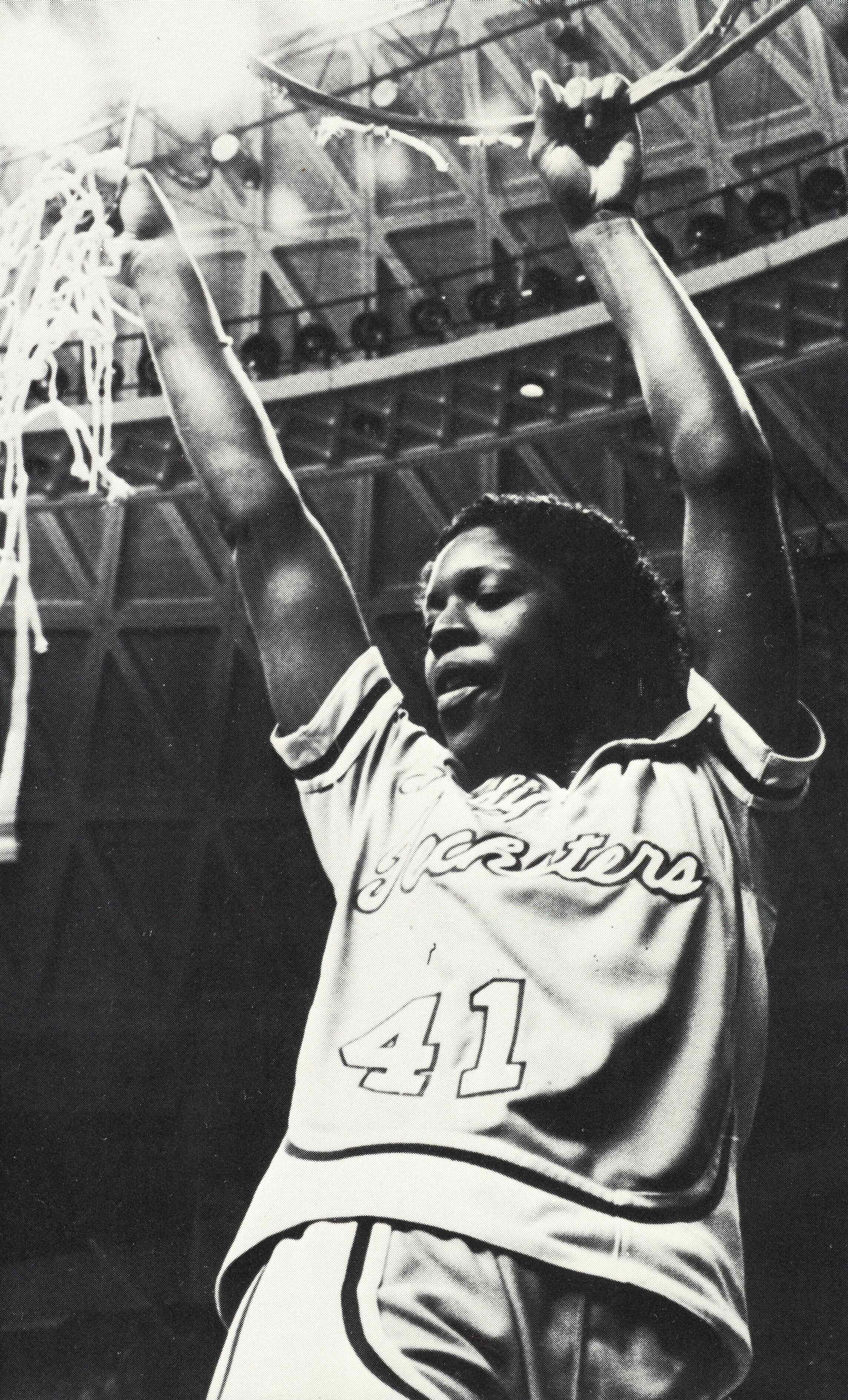
Pam Kelly

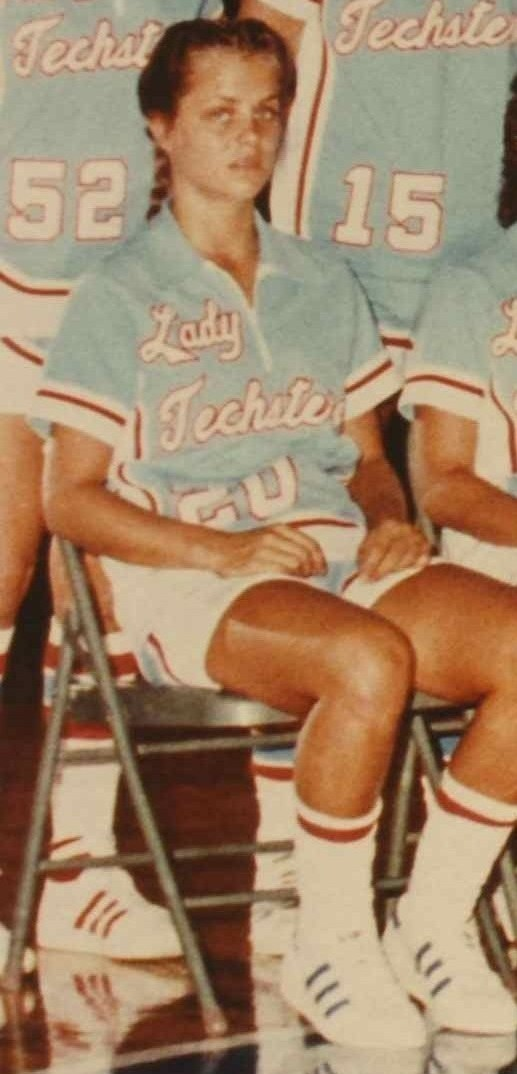
Kim Mulkey

=== Honors ===
Wade Trophy

Three Lady Techsters have been awarded the Wade Trophy, the award presented annually to the best women's basketball player in the NCAA. Connecticut is the only program to have more than three players awarded the Wade Trophy.

- Pam Kelly, 1982
- Janice Lawrence Braxton, 1984
- Teresa Weatherspoon, 1988

Naismith Memorial Basketball Hall of Fame

- Teresa Weatherspoon, inducted in 2019
- Kim Mulkey, inducted in 2020
- Leon Barmore, inducted in 2003

Women's Basketball Hall of Fame

- Pam Kelly, 2007
- Janice Lawrence Braxton, 2006
- Kim Mulkey, 2000
- Teresa Weatherspoon, 2010
- Mickie DeMoss, 2018
- Leon Barmore, 2003

All-Americans

Eleven Lady Techsters have been awarded 16 Kodak First Team All-America honors.

- Pam Kelly, 1980–1981–1982
- Angela Turner, 1982
- Janice Lawrence Braxton, 1983–1984
- Pam Gant, 1985
- Teresa Weatherspoon, 1987–1988
- Nora Lewis, 1989
- Venus Lacy, 1990
- Vickie Johnson, 1995–1996
- Debra Williams, 1996
- Amanda Wilson, 1999
- Tamicha Jackson, 2000

Conference player of the year

Fourteen Lady Techsters have garnered 19 conference player of the year honors.

- Teresa Weatherspoon, 1988
- Venus Lacy, 1989–1990
- Shantel Hardison, 1992
- Pam Thomas, 1994
- Vickie Johnson, 1995–1996
- Alisa Burras, 1997
- Amanda Wilson, 1998–1999
- Betty Lennox, 2000
- Cheryl Ford, 2002–2003
- Amisha Carter, 2004
- Tasha Williams, 2005
- Shan Moore, 2007
- Shanavia Dowdell, 2009–2010
- Adrienne Johnson, 2011

=== Olympic medalists ===
Lady Techsters have won five Olympic Games medals.

Name	Country	Olympiad	Event	Result
Venus Lacy	United States	Atlanta 1996	Women's basketball	1st
Janice Lawrence	United States	Los Angeles 1984	Women's basketball	1st
Kim Mulkey	United States	Los Angeles 1984	Women's basketball	1st
Teresa Weatherspoon	United States	Seoul 1988	Women's basketball	1st
Teresa Weatherspoon	United States	Barcelona 1992	Women's basketball	3rd

=== Lady Techsters in the WNBA ===
Twenty-one former Lady Techsters have been drafted or played in the WNBA. Numerous Lady Techsters have played professional basketball overseas.

Year	Rnd	Pick	Overall	Player name	Position	WNBA team	Notes
1997	Initial Player Allocation			Janice Lawrence Braxton	C	Cleveland Rockers	—
1997	Initial Player Allocation			Teresa Weatherspoon	G	New York Liberty	WNBA All-Star (1999, 2000, 2001, 2002); WNBA Defensive Player of the Year (1997, 1998)
1997	2	4	12	Vickie Johnson	G	New York Liberty	WNBA All-Star (1999, 2001); Kim Perrot Sportsmanship Award (2008)
1997	3	1	17	Racquel Spurlock	C	Houston Comets	—
1997	3	7	23	Debra Williams	G	Charlotte Sting	—
1998	Undrafted			La'Shawn Brown	C	Washington Mystics	—
1999	4	10	46	Amanda Wilson	F	Phoenix Mercury	—
1999	Undrafted			Alisa Burras	C	Cleveland Rockers	—
1999	Undrafted			Monica Maxwell	F	Sacramento Monarchs	—
1999	Undrafted			Venus Lacy	C	New York Liberty	—
2000	1	6	6	Betty Lennox	G	Minnesota Lynx	WNBA Champion (2004); WNBA All-Star (2000); WNBA Rookie of the Year (2000); WNBA Finals MVP (2004)
2000	1	8	8	Tamicha Jackson	G	Detroit Shock	—
2000	4	11	59	Shaka Massey	C	Charlotte Sting	—
2002	2	4	20	Ayana Walker	F	Detroit Shock	WNBA Champion (2003)
2002	3	3	35	Takeisha Lewis	F	Seattle Storm	—
2003	1	3	3	Cheryl Ford	F	Detroit Shock	WNBA Champion (2003, 2006, 2008); WNBA All-Star (2004, 2005, 2006, 2007); WNBA All-Star Game MVP (2007); WNBA Rookie of the Year (2003)
2004	2	4	17	Amisha Carter	C	New York Liberty	—
2004	2	6	19	Trina Frierson	F	Seattle Storm	WNBA Champion (2004)
2005	2	6	19	Erica Taylor	G	Washington Mystics	—
2010	2	6	18	Shanavia Dowdell	F	Washington Mystics	—
2011	3	4	28	Adrienne Johnson	F	Connecticut Sun	—

== Coaches ==
=== Head coaching records ===
General
#	Number of coaches
GC	Games coached

Overall
OW	Wins
OL	Losses
O%	Winning percentage

Conference
CW	Wins
CL	Losses
C%	Winning percentage
RCs	Regular Season Championships
TCs	Tournament Championships

Postseason
PW	Wins
PL	Losses
NCs	National Championships

#	Name	Years	Seasons	GC	OW	OL	O%	CW	CL	C%	PW	PL	RCs	TCs	NCs
1	Sonja Hogg	1974–1985	11	362	307	55	.848	—	—	—	56	16	—	—	2
2	Leon Barmore	1982–2002	20	663	576	87	.869	186	13	.935	56	19	13	12	1
3	Kurt Budke	2002–2005	3	96	80	16	.833	49	5	.907	4	3	3	2	0
4	Chris Long	2005–2009	3.7	115	71	44	.617	40	16	.714	0	1	2	1	0
5	Teresa Weatherspoon	2009–2014	5.3	170	99	71	.582	56	32	.636	1	3	2	1	0
6	Tyler Summitt	2014–2016	2	61	30	31	.492	19	17	.528	0	0	0	0	0
7	Brooke Stoehr	2016–present	9	279	152	127	.545	80	76	.513	2	5	0	0	0

=== Honors ===
Naismith Memorial Basketball Hall of Fame

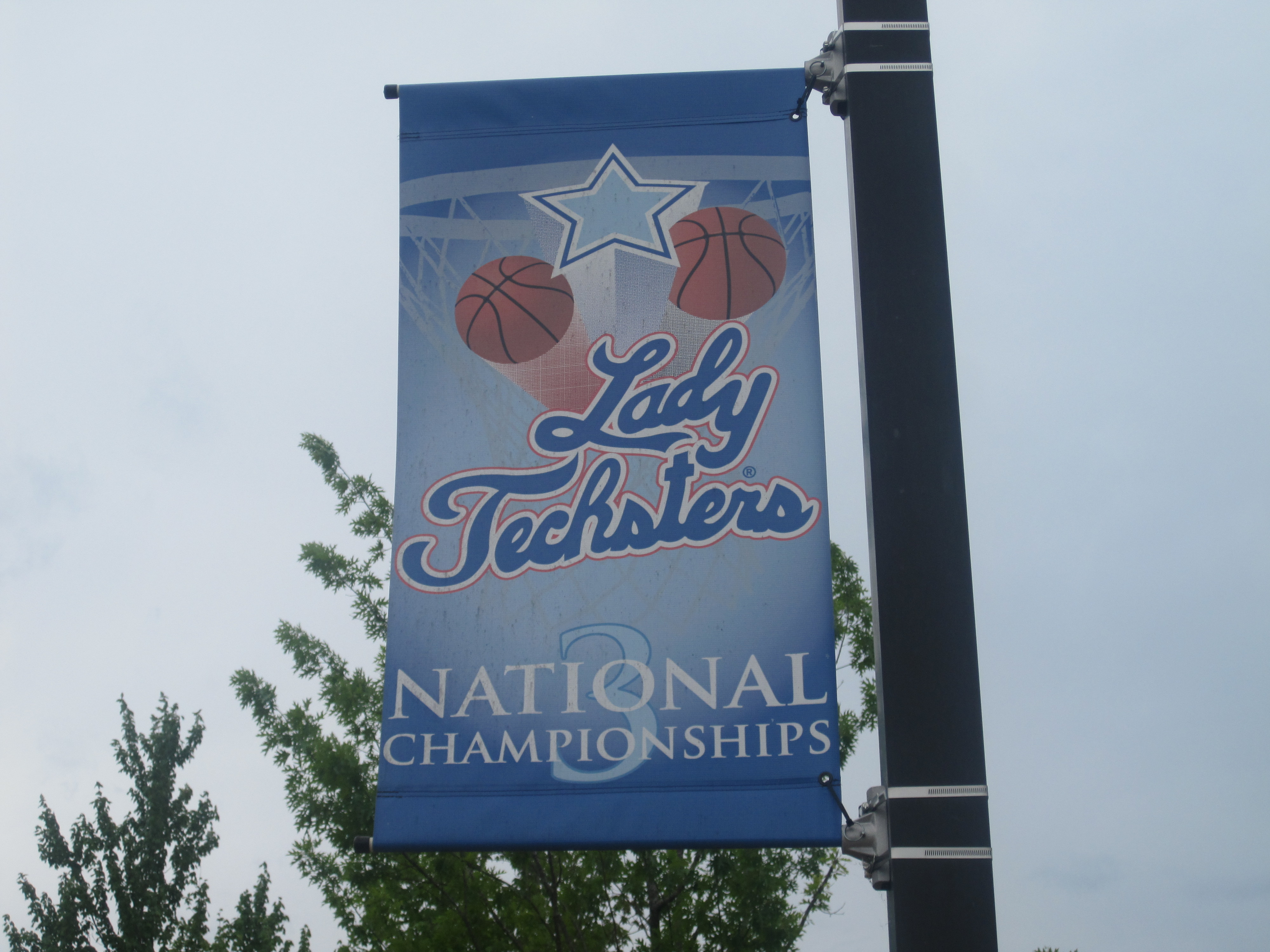
Lady Techsters championship banner

- Leon Barmore, inducted in 2003

Women's Basketball Hall of Fame

- Leon Barmore, inducted in 2003
- Sonja Hogg, inducted in 2009
- Kurt Budke, inducted in 2014
- Mickie DeMoss, inducted in 2018

Naismith Women's College Coach of the Year

- Leon Barmore: 1988

USBWA Women's National Coach of the Year

- Leon Barmore: 1996

Maggie Dixon Award

- Teresa Weatherspoon: 2010

Conference coach of the year

- Leon Barmore: 1988, 1989, 1990, 1991, 1993, 1994, 1996, 1997, 1998, 1999
- Kurt Budke: 2003, 2004
- Chris Long: 2006

=== Leon Barmore coaching tree ===
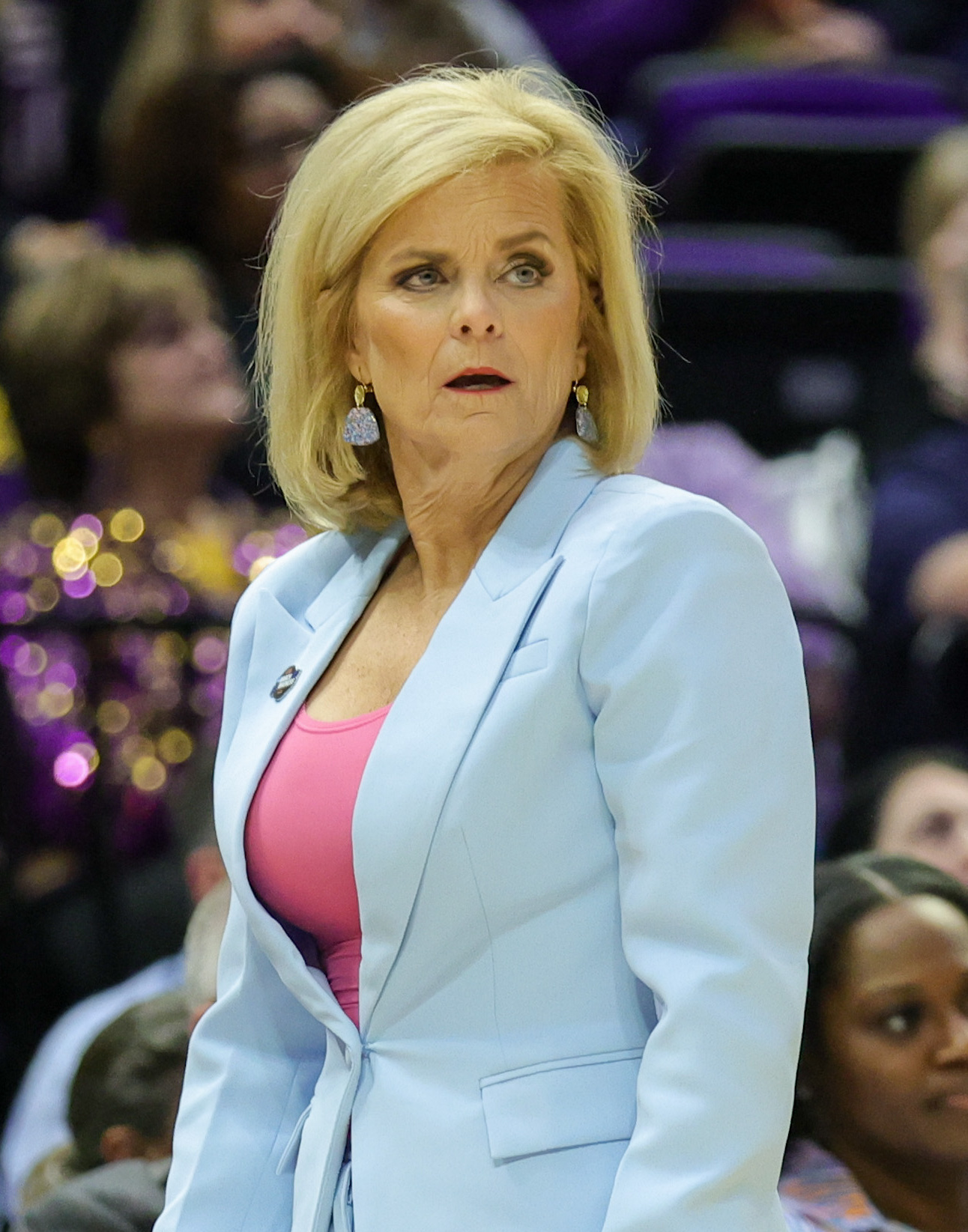
Kim Mulkey

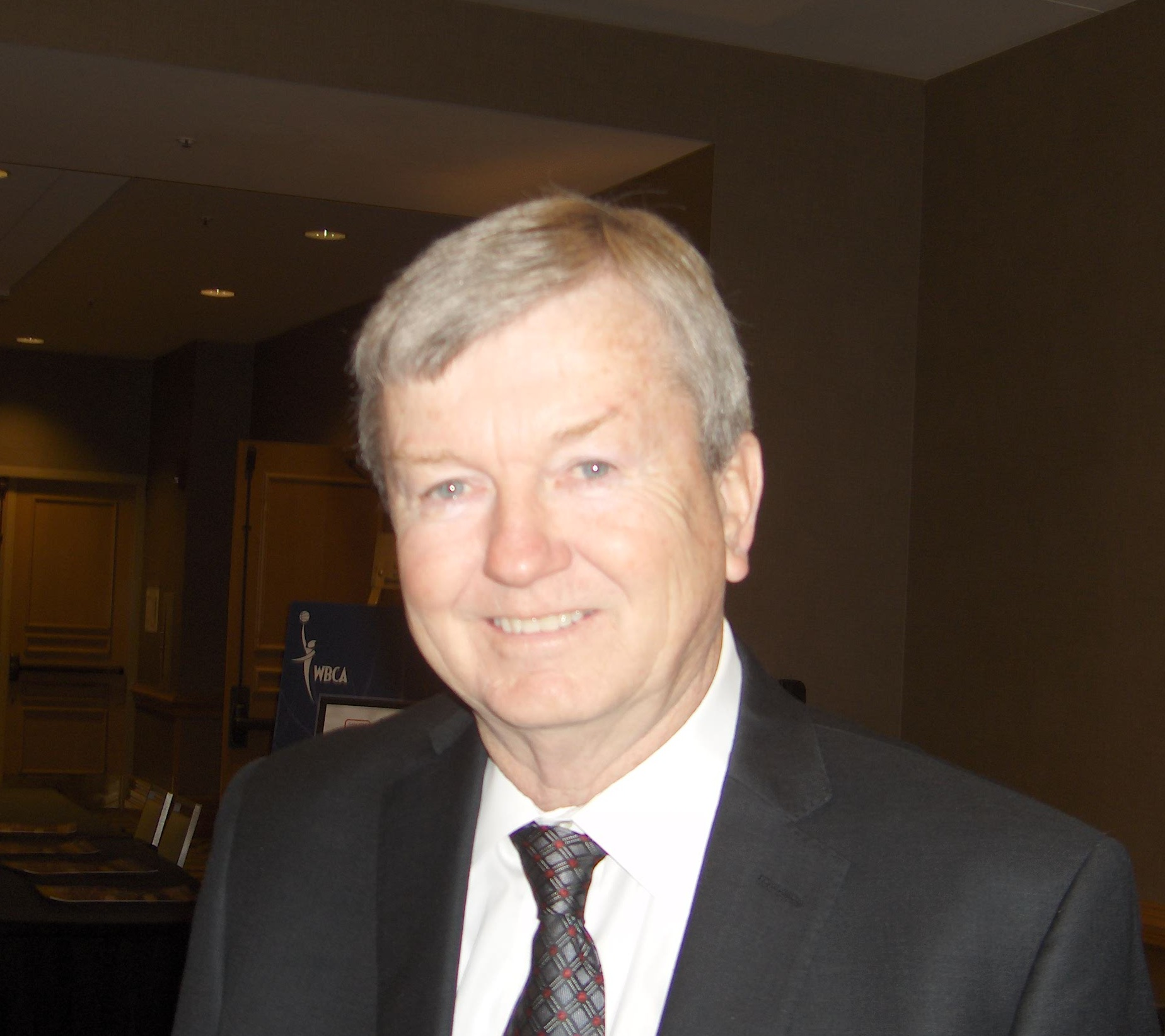
Gary Blair

Nine former assistant coaches under head coach Leon Barmore have become head women's basketball coaches.

- Gary Blair: Stephen F. Austin, Arkansas, Texas A&M
- Kurt Budke: Louisiana Tech, Oklahoma State
- Kristy Curry: Purdue, Texas Tech, Alabama
- Nell Fortner: Purdue, Team USA, Indiana Fever, Auburn
- Stacy Johnson-Klein: Fresno State
- Chris Long: Louisiana Tech
- Kim Mulkey: Baylor, LSU
- Christie Sides: Indiana Fever
- Jennifer White: St. Edward's

=== Lady Techsters in coaching ===
Nine former Lady Techsters have become head women's basketball coaches.

- Amy Brown: Tennessee Tech
- Mickie DeMoss: Florida, Kentucky, Louisiana Tech
- Vickie Johnson: San Antonio Stars, Dallas Wings
- Angela Lawson: Incarnate Word
- Kim Mulkey: Baylor, LSU
- Christie Sides: Indiana Fever
- Brooke Lassiter Stoehr: Northwestern State, Louisiana Tech (current)
- Teresa Weatherspoon: Louisiana Tech
- Jennifer White: St. Edward's

== See also ==
- List of teams with the most victories in NCAA Division I women's college basketball
- NCAA Division I women's basketball tournament bids by school
- NCAA Women's Division I Basketball Championship
- 1981 AIAW National Division I Basketball Championship
- 1982 NCAA Division I women's basketball tournament
- 1988 NCAA Division I women's basketball tournament
- AIAW women's basketball tournament
- WAC women's basketball tournament
- Sun Belt women's basketball tournament
- Louisiana Tech Bulldogs basketball
