= Leon Barmore =

American basketball coach (born 1944)

Biographical details
- Born: June 3, 1944 (age 82); Ruston, Louisiana, U.S.

Playing career
- 1965–1967: Louisiana Tech

Coaching career (HC unless noted)
- 1967–1971: Bastrop HS
- 1971–1977: Ruston HS
- 1977–1980: Louisiana Tech (assistant)
- 1980–1982: Louisiana Tech (assoc. HC)
- 1982–1985: Louisiana Tech (co-HC)
- 1985–2002: Louisiana Tech
- 2008–2011: Baylor (assistant)

Head coaching record
- Overall: 576–87 (.869)

Accomplishments and honors

Championships
- NCAA Division I (1988); 9 NCAA Regional—Final Four (1983, 1984, 1987, 1988, 1989, 1990, 1994, 1998, 1999); 3 American South (1988–1990); 4 American South tournament (1988–1991); 9 Sun Belt (1993–2001); 7 Sun Belt Tournament (1994, 1996–2001); WAC (2002); WAC tournament (2002)

Awards
- Naismith Coach of the Year Award (1988); USBWA Coach of the Year Award (1996); 4× American South Coach of the Year (1988–1991); 6× Sun Belt Coach of the Year (1993, 1994, 1996–1999); Louisiana Sports Hall of Fame (2004); Louisiana Tech Athletic Hall of Fame (2003); Ark-La-Tex Sports Museum of Champions (2008)

Records
- 2nd Best winning percentage in basketball history (.869)
- Basketball Hall of Fame; Inducted in 2003
- Women's Basketball Hall of Fame

William Leon Barmore (born June 3, 1944) is an American former college women's basketball head coach best known for his 35-year association with the Louisiana Tech University Lady Techsters. After five years as an assistant coach, he served as head coach from 1982 to 2002, serving the first three years as co-head coach with Sonja Hogg, who had begun the program in 1974. Upon his retirement, Barmore's .869 winning percentage was the best in major college basketball history, for both men and women's basketball. His nine appearances in the Final Four was second most in NCAA women's basketball history, and as of 2023 it is tied for fourth most all-time. Barmore was inducted into the Women's Basketball Hall of Fame in 2003.

== Early years ==
Barmore was born June 3, 1944, in Ruston, Louisiana, to Jasper Barmore and Flora McCurry. He earned All-State honors as a basketball player at Ruston High School, helping his team to two state championships. He went on to play basketball at Louisiana Tech, serving as captain of the team and earned Gulf States All-Conference honors. In his first coaching job after graduation, he coached the boys basketball team at Bastrop High School where his teams recorded a record of 84–41. In 1971, he moved to his alma mater Ruston High School, where he remained until 1977, and coached the team to a record of 148–49.

== College coaching career ==
=== Louisiana Tech (1977–2002) ===
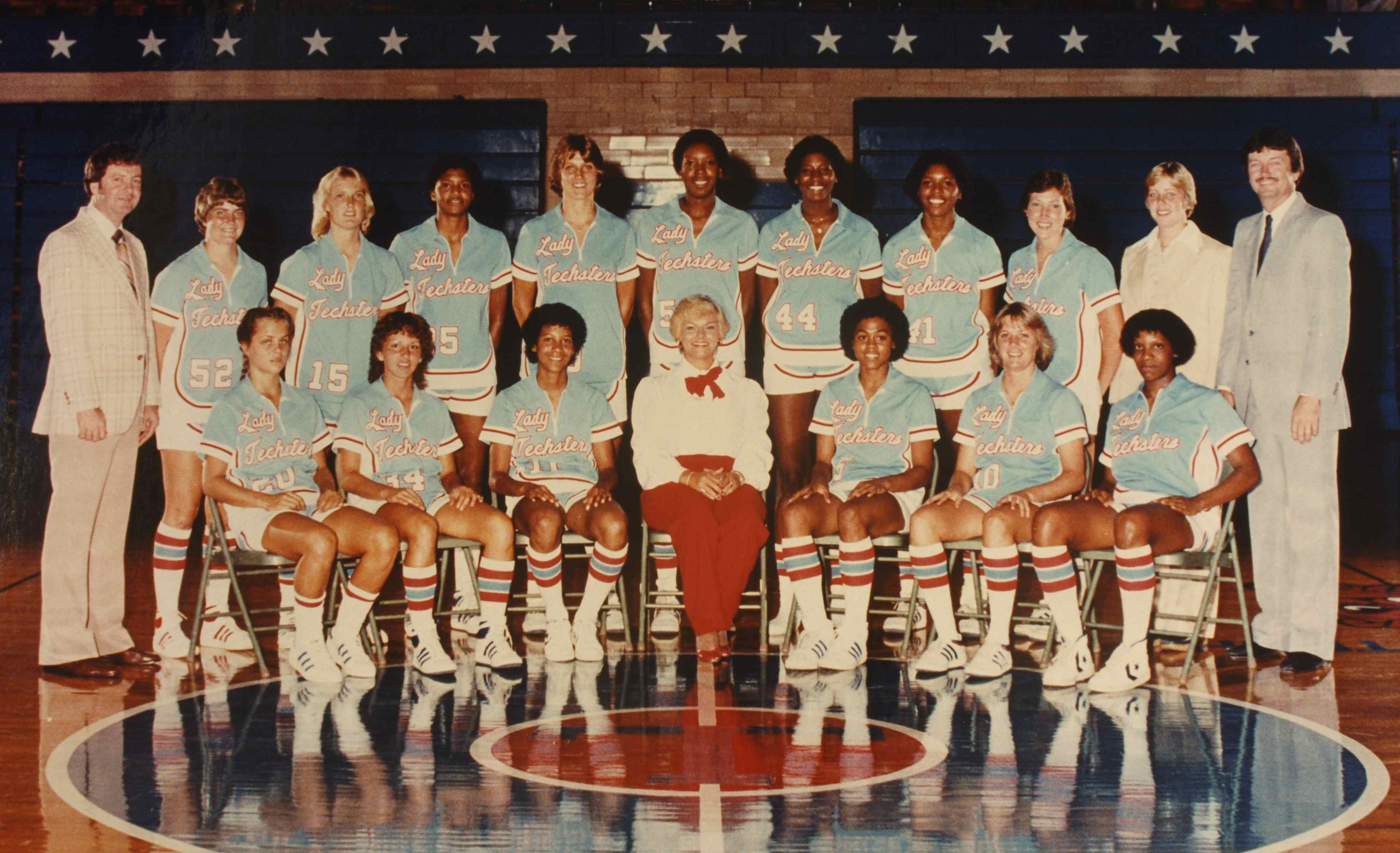
1982 Louisiana Tech women's basketball team

Barmore joined the Louisiana Tech staff in 1977, nominally as Hogg's top assistant. In truth, Barmore handled nearly all game strategy. He was named associate head coach in 1980 and co-head coach in 1982. He took over the reins full-time in 1985, when Hogg left Ruston.

In 20 years as either co-head coach or head coach, Barmore never suffered a losing season and only failed to win 20 games once. He tallied an amazing 13 30-plus win campaigns while also coaching the Lady Techsters to 20 straight NCAA Tournaments, nine Final Fours (including eight in a row from 1983 to 1990), five national championship games and the 1988 national title. He also led Tech to 13 regular season titles in 15 years as a member of either the American South, Sun Belt or Western Athletic conferences, including 10 in a row from 1992 to 2002. When Barmore coached Tech to a 31–5 mark in 2000–01, he became the first coach in Division I college basketball history to record six straight 30-plus win seasons. He was the fastest to reach 450 victories, achieving that accomplishment in 520 games.

Barmore coached 12 Kodak All-Americans, 14 players who have been selected in the WNBA Draft, and 37 first team all-conference selections.

Barmore was awarded the US Basketball Writers Association (USBWA) Coach of the Year award in 1996, as well as the 1996 Russell Athletic/WBCA National Coach of the Year

=== Baylor University (2008–2011) ===
In 2008, Leon decided to resume his coaching career at Baylor University, where he was an assistant under former Louisiana Tech player Kim Mulkey, who played under Barmore from 1980 to 1984 and was his top assistant from 1985 to 2000. In the first round of the 2009 NCAA Tournament, Barmore served as Baylor's interim head coach and led the Bears to an overtime victory over UT-San Antonio (Mulkey missed the game with an illness). Both Mulkey and Barmore are members of the Women's Basketball Hall of Fame (Mulkey as a player and Barmore as a coach) and the Basketball Hall of Fame.

== Hall of Fame ==
Barmore was inducted in the Women's Basketball Hall of Fame in 2003. He was also inducted into the Naismith Basketball Hall of Fame in 2003.

== Head coaching record ==
Record table
Season	Team	Overall	Conference	Standing	Postseason
Louisiana Tech Lady Techsters (NCAA Division I independent) (1982–1987)
1982–83	Louisiana Tech	31–2			NCAA Finalists
1983–84	Louisiana Tech	30–3			NCAA Final Four
1984–85	Louisiana Tech	29–4			NCAA Elite Eight
1985–86	Louisiana Tech	27–5			NCAA Elite Eight
1986–87	Louisiana Tech	30–3			NCAA Finalists
Louisiana Tech Lady Techsters (American South Conference) (1987–1991)
1987–88	Louisiana Tech	32–2	9–0	1st	NCAA Champions
1988–89	Louisiana Tech	32–4	10–0	1st	NCAA Final Four
1989–90	Louisiana Tech	32–1	10–0	1st	NCAA Final Four
1990–91	Louisiana Tech	18–12	9–3	2nd	NCAA First Round
Louisiana Tech Lady Techsters (Sun Belt Conference) (1991–2001)
1991–92	Louisiana Tech	20–10	12–4	T–3rd	NCAA First Round
1992–93	Louisiana Tech	26–6	13–1	T–1st	NCAA Elite Eight
1993–94	Louisiana Tech	31–4	14–0	1st	NCAA Finalists
1994–95	Louisiana Tech	28–5	13–1	1st	NCAA Sweet Sixteen
1995–96	Louisiana Tech	31–2	14–0	1st	NCAA Elite Eight
1996–97	Louisiana Tech	31–4	12–2	T–1st	NCAA Sweet Sixteen
1997–98	Louisiana Tech	31–4	13–1	1st	NCAA Finalists
1998–99	Louisiana Tech	30–3	12–0	1st	NCAA Final Four
1999–00	Louisiana Tech	31–3	16–0	1st	NCAA Elite Eight
2000–01	Louisiana Tech	31–5	16–0	1st	NCAA Elite Eight
Louisiana Tech Lady Techsters (Western Athletic Conference) (2001–2002)
2001–02	Louisiana Tech	25–5	17–1	1st	NCAA First Round
Louisiana Tech:		576–87 (.869)	190–13 (.936)		
Total:		576–87 (.869)			
National champion Postseason invitational champion Conference regular season champion Conference regular season and conference tournament champion Division regular season champion Division regular season and conference tournament champion Conference tournament champion

== Coaching tree ==
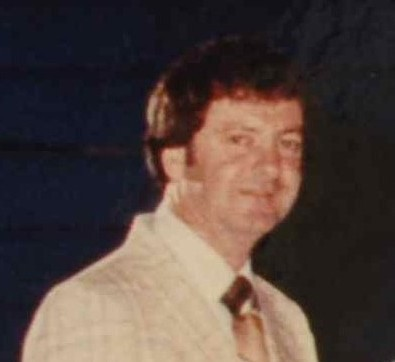
Leon Barmore

Eight former assistant coaches under head coach Leon Barmore have become head women's basketball coaches.

- Gary Blair – Stephen F. Austin, Arkansas, Texas A&M
- Kurt Budke – Louisiana Tech, Oklahoma State
- Kristy Curry – Purdue, Texas Tech, Alabama
- Nell Fortner – Purdue, Team USA, Indiana Fever, Auburn
- Stacy Johnson-Klein – Fresno State
- Chris Long – Louisiana Tech
- Kim Mulkey – Baylor, LSU
- Jennifer White – St. Edward's
