= Adrienne Johnson =

Adrienne Johnson may refer to:

- Adrienne Johnson Kiriakis, a character on NBC's daytime drama Days of Our Lives
- Adrienne Johnson (basketball, born 1974) (born 1974), American basketball player
- Adrienne Johnson (basketball, born 1989) (born 1989), American basketball player
