= Chris Long (basketball) =

American basketball coach (born 1968)

Biographical details
- Born: June 6, 1968 (age 58); Vicksburg, Mississippi, U.S.

Coaching career (HC unless noted)
- 1997–1999: Vicksburg HS
- 1999–2005: Louisiana Tech (asst.)
- 2005–2009: Louisiana Tech
- 2009–2010: UAB (men's asst.)
- 2010–2011: Clemson (asst.)

Head coaching record
- Overall: 71–44 (.617)

Accomplishments and honors

Championships
- 2× WAC champions (2006, 2007); WAC Tournament champions (2006)

Awards
- WAC Coach of the Year (2006)

Christopher H. Long (born June 6, 1968) is an American college basketball coach. He graduated from the University of Southern Mississippi in 1991 with a degree in advertising and from Alcorn State University in 1997 with a master's degree in school administration. Long served as the head girls' basketball coach at Vicksburg High School from 1997 to 1999 while compiling a 46–19 record. He then became a women's basketball assistant coach under Leon Barmore and Kurt Budke at Louisiana Tech University. Long was named head coach of the Lady Techsters in 2005 and served in that position until he was fired during the 2008–09 season. He then took a men's basketball assistant coaching position under Mike Davis at UAB. In 2010, he got back to women's college basketball at Clemson University to serve as an assistant for Itoro Coleman.

== Head coaching record ==
Record table
| Season | Team | Overall | Conference | Standing | Postseason |
|---|---|---|---|---|---|
Louisiana Tech Lady Techsters (WAC) (2005–2009)
| 2005–06 | Louisiana Tech | 26–5 | 15–1 | 1st | NCAA First Round |
| 2006–07 | Louisiana Tech | 17–13 | 12–4 | T–1st | |
| 2007–08 | Louisiana Tech | 16–15 | 9–7 | T–4th | |
| 2008–09 | Louisiana Tech | 12–11 | 4–4 | – | – |
| Louisiana Tech: | | 71–44 | 40–16 | | |
| Total: | | 71–44 | | | |
National champion Postseason invitational champion Conference regular season champion Conference regular season and conference tournament champion Division regular season champion Division regular season and conference tournament champion Conference tournament champion
