= Louisiana Tech University Athletic Hall of Fame =

The Louisiana Tech University Athletic Hall of Fame was established in 1984 to honor student-athletes, coaches, administrators, and benefactors who have been highly successful at Louisiana Tech and who have distinguished themselves professionally. To be eligible for induction into the Louisiana Tech Athletic Hall of Fame, an athlete must have completed their college eligibility at least five years prior to the selection, and coaches and administrators must have completed their careers at Louisiana Tech at least three years before induction.

== Inductees ==
Year Inducted	Name	Sport or capacity	Years at Tech
1984	Joe Aillet	Football coach, athletic director	1940–1970
1984	Terry Bradshaw	Football letterwinner	1966–1969
1984	Atley Donald	Baseball letterwinner	1930–1933
1984	Garland Gregory	Football letterwinner	1938–1941
1984	Pam Kelly	Women's basketball letterwinner	1978–1982
1984	Maxie Lambright	Football coach, athletic director	1967–1978
1984	Jackie Moreland	Men's basketball letterwinner	1958–1960
1985	Cecil Crowley	Men's basketball coach	1940–1942, 1945–1964
1985	Ragan Green	Team physician	1930–1960s
1985	Bruce Lenoir	Track letterwinner	1952–1956
1985	Mike Reed	Football letterwinner	1942, 1945–1947
1985	Leo Sanford	Football letterwinner	1947–1950
1985	W. Harry "Eva" Talbot	Football letterwinner	1918–1919
1986	Billy Bundrick	Football letterwinner, team physician	1957–1959
1986	L. J. "Hoss" Garrett	Football letterwinner	1932–1933
1986	Charles Gilbert	Football, baseball, track letterwinner	1927–1931
1986	Roland Harper	Football letterwinner	1971–1974
1986	Berry Hinton	Baseball coach	1945–1967
1986	Sonja Hogg	Women's basketball coach	1974–1985
1987	Joe Hinton	Football letterwinner	1957–1960
1987	Pat Hinton	Football letterwinner	1953–1956
1987	Tom Hinton	Football letterwinner	1954–1957
1987	George "Blue" Hogg	Football letterwinner, H & PE coach	1923–1926, 1934–65
1987	Janice Lawrence Braxton	Women's basketball letterwinner	1981–1984
1987	Jim Mize	Track coach, football coach	1946–1977
1987	Mickey Slaughter	Football letterwinner, football coach	1959–1962, 1967–1978
1987	Billy Wiggins	Men's basketball letterwinner	1952–1956
1988	Larry Anderson	Football letterwinner	1974–1977
1988	J. Madison Brooks	Football, men's basketball, baseball letterwinner	1932–1936
1988	W. A. "Bill" Ruple	Football letterwinner	1932–1936
1988	Tommy Spinks	Football letterwinner	1966–1969
1988	T. H. "Muddy" Waters	Football, men's basketball, track letterwinner	1932–1936
1989	Harley Boss	Baseball letterwinner	1925–1927
1989	Nick Medica	Men's basketball letterwinner	1931–1934
1989	Russell Rainbolt	Football, track letterwinner	1952–1955
1989	Jack Thigpen	Football, baseball letterwinner	1932–1936
1989	George Woodson	Baseball letterwinner	1961–1964
1990	Fred Dean	Football letterwinner	1971–1974
1990	O. M. "Ding" Merriott	Men's basketball, baseball, football letterwinner	1937–1941
1990	Harold Smolinski	Athletic council chairman	1952–1985
1990	Angela Turner	Women's basketball letterwinner	1979–1982
1990	Joe Williams	Football, men's basketball, baseball letterwinner	1937–1939
1992	Zurk Lewis	Baseball, men's basketball, football letterwinner	1934–1938
1992	Karl Malone	Men's basketball letterwinner	1982–1985
1992	W. L. "Billy" Mitchell	Men's basketball, baseball, football letterwinner	1933–1937
1992	Kim Mulkey	Women's basketball letterwinner	1980–1984
1992	F. Jay Taylor	University President	1962–1987
1995	Mike Barber	Football letterwinner	1972–1975
1995	Racer Holstead	Football, baseball letterwinner	1944, 1947–1949
1995	Lee Ann Jarvis	Softball letterwinner	1982–1985
1995	Joe McNeely	Football letterwinner	1970–1973
1995	Charles "Hoss" Newman	Football letterwinner	1941–1942, 1946–1947
1995	Teresa Weatherspoon	Women's basketball letterwinner	1984–1988
1995	John Henry White	Football letterwinner	1974–1977
1998	Bobby Aillet	Football letterwinner	1945, 1948–1949
1998	P. J. Brown	Men's basketball letterwinner	1989–1992
1998	James Davison	Athletic benefactor	
1998	Guthrie Jarrell	Men's basketball letterwinner, athletic benefactor	1946
1998	Stacey Johnson	Softball letterwinner	1983–1986
1998	Pat Patterson	Football letterwinner, baseball coach, football coach	1953–1956, 1967–1990
1998	Scotty Robertson	Basketball letterwinner, basketball coach	1950–1951, 1964–1974
1998	Ricky Stubbs	Track letterwinner	1971–1974
2003	Leon Barmore	Men's basketball letterwinner, women's basketball coach	1965–1967, 1982–2002
2003	Jerry Lovett	Men's basketball letterwinner	1949–1952
2003	William A. Marbury, Jr.	Athletic benefactor	
2003	Debbie Nichols	Softball letterwinner	1987–1990
2003	Willie Roaf	Football letterwinner	1989–1992
2003	Charles Wyly	Football letterwinner	1952–1955
2007	Roger Carr	Football letterwinner	1970–1973
2007	Vickie Johnson	Women's basketball letterwinner	1992–1996
2007	Katie Dow Kahmann	Volleyball letterwinner	1989–1992
2007	Tim Rattay	Football letterwinner	1997–1999
2007	A. L. Williams	Football letterwinner, football coach	1953–1956, 1983–1986
2007	Milton Williams	Athletic benefactor	
2011	Matt Dunigan	Football letterwinner	1979–1982
2011	Venus Lacy	Women's basketball letterwinner	1987–1990
2011	David Lee	Football, baseball letterwinner	1961–1964
2011	Mike McConathy	Men's basketball letterwinner	1973–1977
2011	Paul Millsap	Men's basketball letterwinner	2003–2006
2011	Dave Nitz	Broadcaster	1974–present
2011	T. J. Soto	Baseball letterwinner	1997–2000
2011	Matt Stover	Football letterwinner	1986–1989
2013	O. K. "Buddy" Davis	Journalist	1964–present
2013	Bill Galloway	Softball coach	1982–2002
2013	Walter Johnson	Football letterwinner	1983–1986
2013	April Malveo	Track and Field letterwinner	1995–1999
2013	George Stone	Baseball, men's basketball letterwinner	1965–1966
2014	Dan Reneau	University President	1987–2013
2015	Bob Brunet	Football letterwinner	1964–1967
2015	Troy Edwards	Football letterwinner	1996–1998
2015	Mike Green	Men's basketball letterwinner	1970–1973
2015	Nora Lewis	Women's basketball letterwinner	1985–1989
2015	Charlie Montoyo	Baseball letterwinner	1985–1987
2017	Denny Duron	Football letterwinner	1970–1973
2017	Tommy Joe Eagles	Men's basketball letterwinner, men's basketball coach	1967–1971, 1979–1989
2017	Pam Gant	Women's basketball letterwinner	1981–1985
2017	Dale Holman	Baseball letterwinner	1977–1979
2017	Luke McCown	Football letterwinner	2000–2003
2017	Keith Prince	Sports Information Director	1969–1993
2017	Pat Tilley	Football letterwinner	1972–1975
