= Pam Kelly =

American basketball player

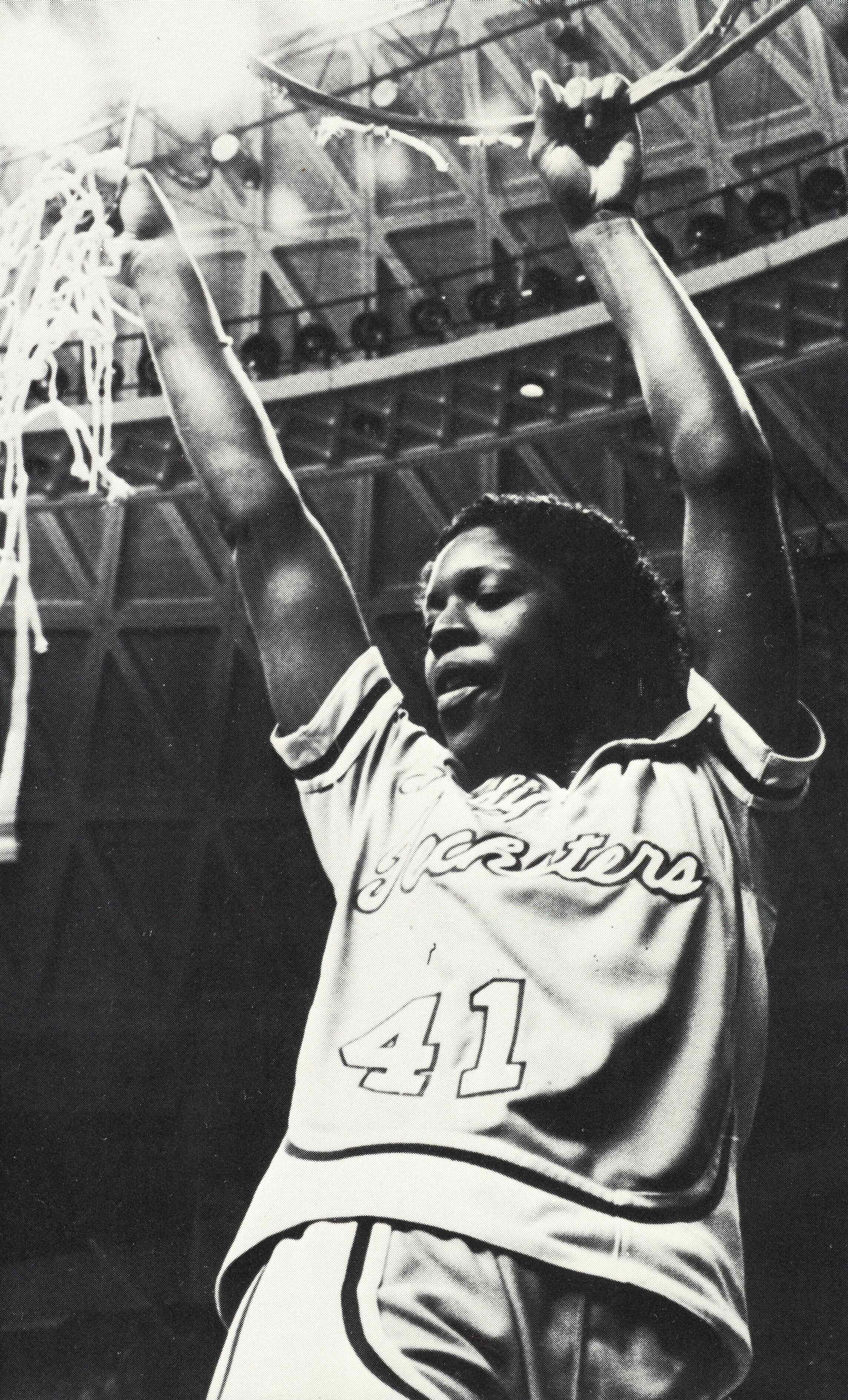

Personal information
- Born: Columbia, Louisiana, U.S.
- Listed height: 6 ft 0 in (1.83 m)

Career information
- College: Louisiana Tech
- Playing career: 1978–1982
- Position: Center

Career highlights
- Wade Trophy (1982); 3× Kodak All-American (1980–1982); Broderick Award (1982); Louisiana Tech Athletic Hall of Fame (1984)
- Women's Basketball Hall of Fame

Pamela Kelly-Flowers, a native of Columbia, Louisiana is an American former women's basketball player at Louisiana Tech University. She won two national championships for the Lady Techsters. She was named to the All-American team in 1980, 1981, and 1982, her school's only three-time All-American. Kelly won the 1982 Wade Trophy and the 1982 Honda Sports Award for basketball, awards presented annually to the best women's basketball player in the National Collegiate Athletic Association. She was enshrined as a charter member into the Louisiana Tech Athletic Hall of Fame in 1984, and her #41 jersey was retired. She was inducted in 1992 into the Louisiana Sports Hall of Fame.

She was inducted into the Women's Basketball Hall of Fame in 2007.

Kelly is married to Nathan Flowers Sr., and the couple has two sons. Her son John Flowers is a professional basketball player.

== Louisiana Tech statistics ==
Legend
GP	Games played	GS	Games started	MPG	Minutes per game
FG%	Field goal percentage	3P%	3-point field goal percentage	FT%	Free throw percentage
RPG	Rebounds per game	APG	Assists per game	SPG	Steals per game
BPG	Blocks per game	PPG	Points per game	**Bold**	Career high

Year	Team	GP	Points	FG%	FT%	RPG	PPG
1979	Louisiana Tech	38	721	63.8%	56.4%	9.8	19.0
1980	Louisiana Tech	**45**	**932**	61.1%	59.4%	**10.9**	**20.7**
1981	Louisiana Tech	34	595	59.9%	60.3%	9.5	17.5
1982	Louisiana Tech	36	731	**64.4%**	**69.2%**	9.1	20.3
Career		153	2979	62.3%	61.5%	9.9	19.5

== Awards and honors ==
- 1982—Winner of the Broderick Award (now the Honda Sports Award) for basketball
- 1982—Wade Trophy
