= Sonja Hogg =

American basketball coach (born 1945)

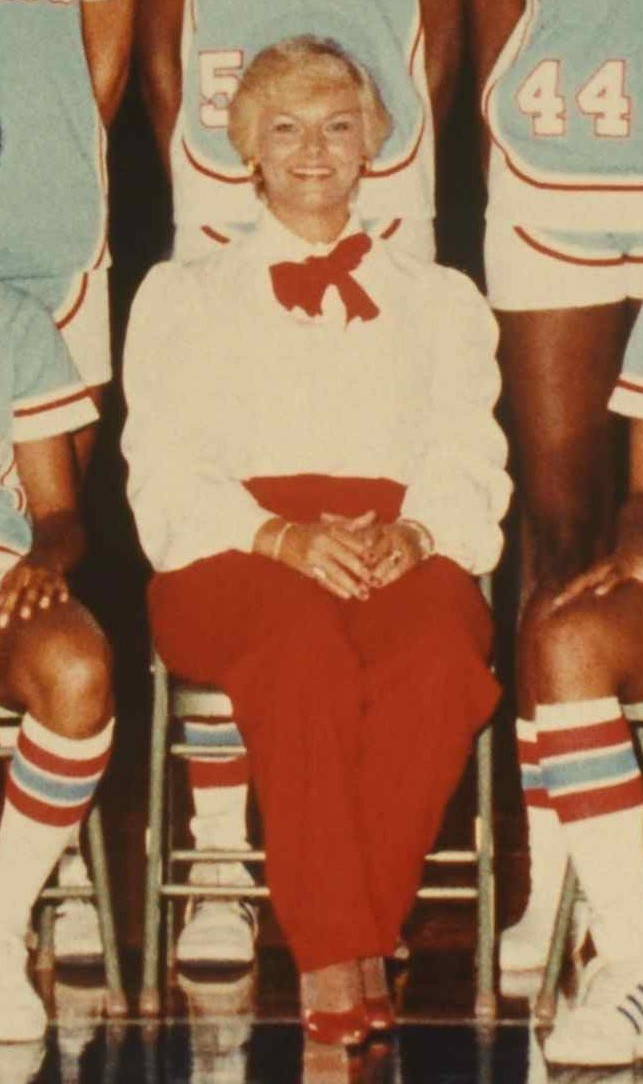
- Hogg at Louisiana Tech in 1982

Biographical details
- Born: December 20, 1945 (age 80)

Coaching career (HC unless noted)
- 1974–1985: Louisiana Tech
- 1986–1988: Deer Park HS
- 1994–2000: Baylor

Head coaching record
- Overall: 390–146 (.728)

Accomplishments and honors

Championships
- AIAW (1981); NCAA Division I (1982); 3× NCAA Regional—Final Four (1982, 1983, 1984)

Awards
- Louisiana Tech Athletic Hall of Fame (1986); Louisiana Sports Hall of Fame (2009)
- Women's Basketball Hall of Fame

Sonja Hogg (born December 20, 1945) is the former women's basketball program head coach at Louisiana Tech University and Baylor University. She posted an overall record of 307–55 at Louisiana Tech. Her record at Baylor in the Southwest Conference era was 24–33 overall (7–21 in conference). Hogg's record at Baylor in the Big 12 conference era was 59–58 overall (27–37 league mark). Her overall record at Baylor for all years was 83–91. Her combined overall record for her entire coaching career was 390–146.

== Coaching career ==
=== Louisiana Tech (1974–1985) ===
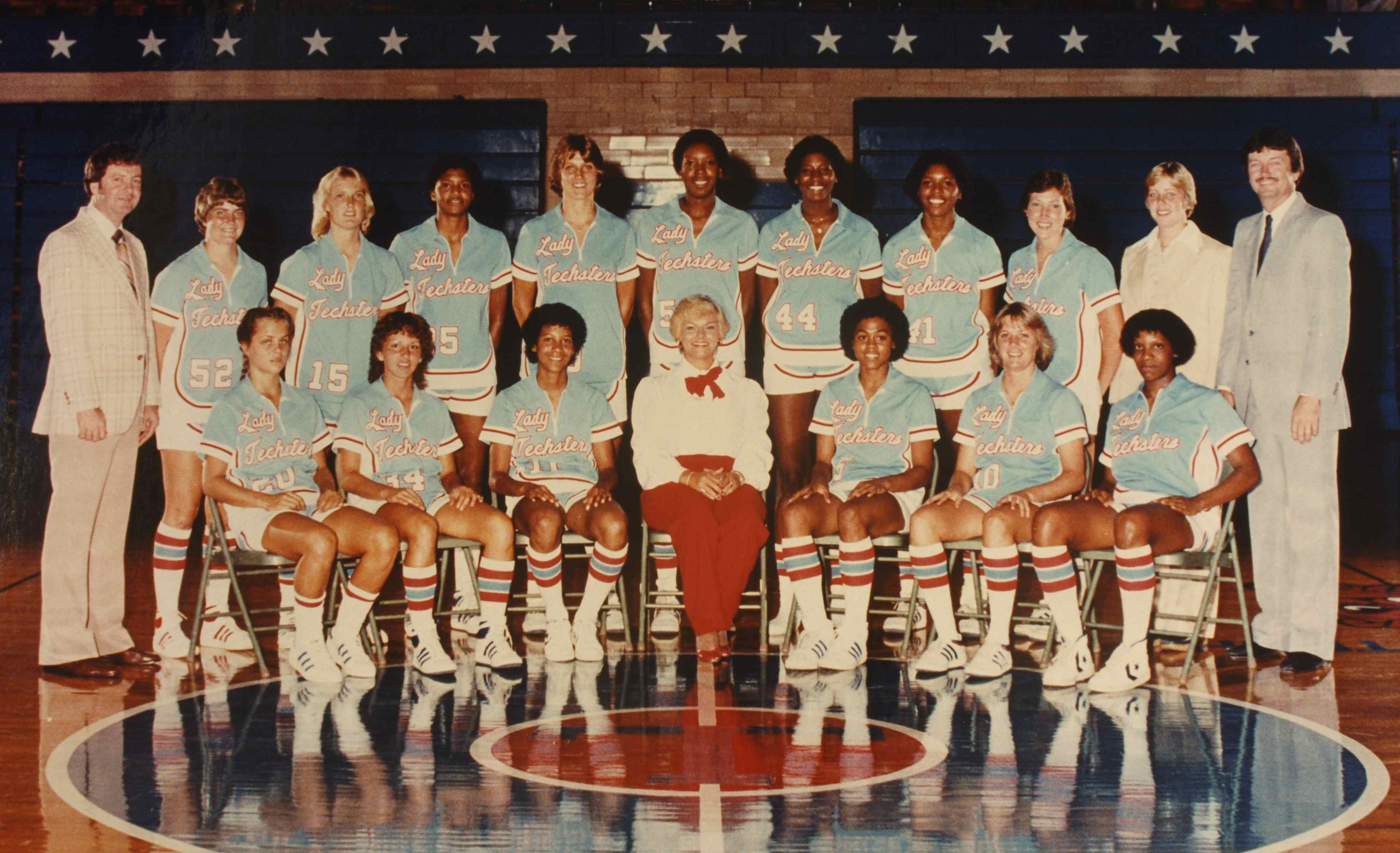
1982 Louisiana Tech women's basketball team

Hogg was a physical education teacher at Ruston High School when she interviewed at Louisiana Tech for a position in its P.E. department. School president Dr. F. Jay Taylor remarked that several students had approached him about starting a women's basketball team. He asked if she would be interested, and she agreed.

When Hogg began putting together the team, she nicknamed it the "Lady Techsters." She felt the school's longtime nickname of Bulldogs was unfeminine, and disliked the idea that her players might be called "bitches" (a term for female dogs). She insisted that her players maintain standards and act like ladies off the court.

Hogg won the 1981 Association of Intercollegiate Athletics for Women title, beating Tennessee to finish the season undefeated at 34–0. Her team won the first NCAA women's title in 1982. From 1982 to 1985, she was co-head coach with her former top assistant, Leon Barmore, and completely turned over the reins to Barmore in 1985. Hogg finished with a record of 307–55 as head coach at Louisiana Tech.

=== Deer Park High School (1986–1988) ===
Hogg coached at Deer Park High School from 1986 to 1988.

=== Baylor (1994–2000) ===
Hogg came out of retirement in 1994, and coached at Baylor for six years. She finished with a record of 83–91 as head coach at Baylor.

== Hall of Fame ==
In 1986, Hogg was inducted into the Louisiana Tech University Athletic Hall of Fame. She received the 2004 Women's Naismith Outstanding Contribution to Basketball Award. In 2009, she was inducted to the Women's Basketball Hall of Fame, located in Knoxville, Tennessee. In June 2009, she was inducted into the Louisiana Sports Hall of Fame.

== Head coaching record ==
Record table
Season	Team	Overall	Conference	Standing	Postseason
Louisiana Tech Lady Techsters (Independent) (1974–1985)
1974–75	Louisiana Tech	13–9			
1975–76	Louisiana Tech	19–10			
1976–77	Louisiana Tech	22–9			
1977–78	Louisiana Tech	20–8			
1978–79	Louisiana Tech	34–4			AIAW Runner-Up
1979–80	Louisiana Tech	40–5			AIAW Final Four
1980–81	Louisiana Tech	34–0			AIAW National Champions
1981–82	Louisiana Tech	35–1			NCAA Champions
1982–83	Louisiana Tech	31–2			NCAA Runner–up
1983–84	Louisiana Tech	30–3			NCAA Final Four
1984–85	Louisiana Tech	29–4			NCAA Elite Eight
Louisiana Tech:		307–55 (.848)			
Baylor Lady Bears (Southwest Conference) (1994–1996)
1994–95	Baylor	13–14	4–10	7th	
1995–96	Baylor	11–19	3–11	7th	
Baylor Lady Bears (Big 12 Conference) (1996–2000)
1996–97	Baylor	15–13	7–9	T–8th	
1997–98	Baylor	20–11	10–6	T–5th	WNIT Runner–up
1998–99	Baylor	17–14	8–8	T–5th	WNIT Second Round
1999–00	Baylor	7–20	2–14	12th	
Baylor:		83–91 (.477)	34–58 (.370)		
Total:		390–146 (.728)			
National champion Postseason invitational champion Conference regular season champion Conference regular season and conference tournament champion Division regular season champion Division regular season and conference tournament champion Conference tournament champion
