= Debra Williams (basketball) =

American basketball player

Personal information
- Born: October 23, 1972 (age 54)

Career information
- College: Louisiana Tech
- WNBA draft: 1997: 3rd round, 23rd overall pick
- Drafted by: Charlotte Sting
- Position: Guard

Career history
- 1997: Charlotte Sting

Career highlights
- Second-team All-American – AP (1996); Kodak All-American (1996); Sun Belt Tournament MVP (1994); 3x All-Sun Belt (1994–1996)
- Stats at Basketball Reference

Debra Williams (born October 23, 1972) is a former professional basketball player who participated in the WNBAs inaugural season in 1997, playing 10 games for the Charlotte Sting.

== WNBA career ==
Williams was selected in the 3rd round (23rd overall pick) of the 1997 WNBA draft by the Charlotte Sting. Her debut game was played on June 22, 1997 in a 59 - 76 loss to the Phoenix Mercury where she recorded 2 points and 3 rebounds. She would go on to only play 10 games in her rookie season, missing 18 of the Sting's last 21 games of the season from July 10 to August 24. In her 10 games with the Sting, Williams averaged 2.7 points and 1.3 rebounds on 25.6% FG Shooting (11 - 43 FG).

The 10th game of Williams' rookie season ended up being the final game of her WNBA career. That game was played on July 17, 1997 with the Sting losing to the Cleveland Rockers 47 - 65. Williams would have a disappointing final game, playing for 8 minutes, recording 2 fouls, 1 turnover and missing all 3 of her field-goal attempts (but she was able to grab 1 rebound).

== Career statistics ==
Legend
GP	Games played	GS	Games started	MPG	Minutes per game	RPG	Rebounds per game
APG	Assists per game	SPG	Steals per game	BPG	Blocks per game	PPG	Points per game
TO	Turnovers per game	FG%	Field-goal percentage	3P%	3-point field-goal percentage	FT%	Free-throw percentage
**Bold**	Career best	°	League leader

=== WNBA ===
==== Regular season ====
Year	Team	GP	GS	MPG	FG%	3P%	FT%	RPG	APG	SPG	BPG	TO	PPG
1997	Charlotte	10	2	11.6	25.6	22.2	50.0	1.3		0.2	0.0	0.6	2.7
Career	1 year, 1 team	10	2	11.6	25.6	22.2	50.0	1.3		0.2	0.0	0.6	2.7

=== College ===
Year	Team	GP	GS	MPG	FG%	3P%	FT%	RPG	APG	SPG	BPG	TO	PPG
1992–93	Louisiana Tech	32	-	-	39.9	30.2	56.7	4.2	1.0	0.6	0.1	-	9.1
1993–94	Louisiana Tech	**35**	-	-	43.9	**39.1**	75.3	4.5	1.4	**1.5**	0.1	-	13.2
1994–95	Louisiana Tech	31	-	-	43.6	33.0	**79.0**	3.6	**1.5**	1.3	0.0	-	13.9
1995–96	Louisiana Tech	32	-	-	**47.2**	38.8	72.3	**4.8**	**1.5**	1.2	**0.3**	-	**17.7**
**Career**		130	-	-	44.0	36.0	71.8	4.3	1.3	1.1	0.1	-	13.5
Statistics retrieved from Sports-Reference.

== Personal life ==
Williams majored in psychology at Louisiana Tech University. She was married to Herb Williams, a former NBA player, and has two children: one boy and one girl.
