= Brooke Stoehr =

American basketball coach

Current position
- Title: Head coach
- Team: Louisiana Tech
- Conference: Sun Belt
- Record: 175–134 (.566)

Biographical details
- Born: October 19, 1980 (age 46)

Playing career
- 1998–2002: Louisiana Tech
- Position: Point guard

Coaching career (HC unless noted)
- 2002–2003: Florida State (GA)
- 2003–2005: Arkansas–Little Rock (asst.)
- 2005–2008: Louisiana Tech (asst.)
- 2008–2009: Southern Miss (asst.)
- 2009–2012: Texas Tech (asst.)
- 2012–2016: Northwestern State
- 2016–present: Louisiana Tech

Head coaching record
- Overall: 246–192 (.562)
- Tournaments: NCAA 0–2; WNIT 1–6; WBI 0–1; WBIT 0–1

Accomplishments and honors

Championships
- 2× Southland Tournament champions (2014–2015); Conference USA West Division (2022); Conference USA regular season (2026)

Awards
- LSWA Louisiana Coach of the Year (2014); Conference USA Coach of the Year (2026) As a player: All-Sun Belt (2001)

Brooke Lassiter Stoehr (born October 19, 1980) is an American college basketball coach and former player.

== Career ==
She is the current head coach of the Louisiana Tech Lady Techsters basketball. Before taking over at Louisiana Tech, Stoehr coached for four seasons at Northwestern State.

== Louisiana Tech statistics ==
Legend
GP	Games played	GS	Games started	MPG	Minutes per game
FG%	Field goal percentage	3P%	3-point field goal percentage	FT%	Free throw percentage
RPG	Rebounds per game	APG	Assists per game	SPG	Steals per game
BPG	Blocks per game	PPG	Points per game	**Bold**	Career high

Year	Team	GP	Points	FG%	3P%	FT%	RPG	APG	SPG	BPG	PPG
1998–99	Louisiana Tech	28	87	**48.9**	36.8	90.0	1.6	1.3	0.7	–	3.1
1999–00	Louisiana Tech	34	166	42.0	36.7	90.1	2.2	3.2	0.9	0.1	4.9
2000–01	Louisiana Tech	**36**	**367**	40.8	**40.0**	91.0	3.4	**5.0**	**1.6**	0.1	**10.2**
2001–02	Louisiana Tech	30	254	36.6	38.3	**95.1**	**3.8**	3.5	1.3	0.1	8.5
Career	Louisiana Tech	128	874	40.2	38.6	91.5	2.8	3.4	1.1	0.1	6.8

== Head coaching record ==
Record table
Season	Team	Overall	Conference	Standing	Postseason
**Northwestern State Lady Demons** (Southland Conference) (2012–2016)
2012–13	Northwestern State	12–18	7–11	8th	
2013–14	Northwestern State	21–13	11–7	T–4th	NCAA First Round
2014–15	Northwestern State	19–15	10–8	T–6th	NCAA First Round
2015–16	Northwestern State	19–12	13–5	3rd	WBI First Round
Northwestern State:		71–58 (.550)	41–31 (.569)		
**Louisiana Tech Lady Techsters** (Conference USA) (2016–2025)
2016–17	Louisiana Tech	18–14	12–6	T–4th	WNIT First Round
2017–18	Louisiana Tech	19–12	10–6	T–3rd	WNIT First Round
2018–19	Louisiana Tech	14–16	6–10	10th	
2019–20	Louisiana Tech	15–15	6–12	T–12th	
2020–21	Louisiana Tech	14–10	8–8	4th (West)	
2021–22	Louisiana Tech	21–12	11–7	1st (West)	WNIT First Round
2022–23	Louisiana Tech	19–13	12–8	5th	WNIT First Round
2023–24	Louisiana Tech	14–19	7–9	T–4th	
2024–25	Louisiana Tech	18–16	8–10	5th	WNIT Great 8
2025–26	Louisiana Tech	26–7	17–1	1st	WBIT First Round
Louisiana Tech:		175–134 (.566)	94–77 (.550)		
Total:		246–192 (.562)			
National champion Postseason invitational champion Conference regular season champion Conference regular season and conference tournament champion Division regular season champion Division regular season and conference tournament champion Conference tournament champion
