= Wade Trophy =

- Awarded for: The best female college basketball player in the United States
- Country: United States
- Presented by: Women's Basketball Coaches Association (starting in 2001)
- First award: 1978
- Currently held by: Sarah Strong, UConn
- Website: Official website

The Wade Trophy is an award presented annually to the best women's basketball player in National Collegiate Athletic Association (NCAA) Division I competition. It is named after three–time national champion Delta State University coach Lily Margaret Wade. The award debuted in 1978 as the first–ever women's national player of the year award in college basketball. State Farm Insurance sponsors the award, and the trophy is presented at the Women's Basketball Coaches Association (WBCA) National Convention.

UConn has the most all-time awards with eleven, and the most individual recipients, with eight. Maya Moore is the only player to win the Wade Trophy three times, accomplishing the feat in 2009, 2010 and 2011. Other multiple award winners include Nancy Lieberman (1979, 1980), Seimone Augustus (2005, 2006), Brittney Griner (2012, 2013), Breanna Stewart (2015, 2016), Sabrina Ionescu (2019, 2020), and Caitlin Clark (2023, 2024).

Baylor is in sole possession of second in total awards, and is in a second-place tie with two other schools for the most individual recipients. Three Baylor players have combined to win four awards. The other two programs with three individual recipients are Louisiana Tech and Texas, with all of each school's winners having received the award once. There have never been any ties for the award.

== Eligibility and criteria ==
All academically eligible women's basketball athletes, in NCAA Division I qualify as candidates.

- Member of the NCAA Division I Kodak/WBCA All-America Team
- Game and season statistics
- Effect on team
- Leadership
- Character
- Overall playing ability
- Player that embodies the "Spirit of Margaret Wade" as defined by the WBCA and the NAGWS

== Winners ==
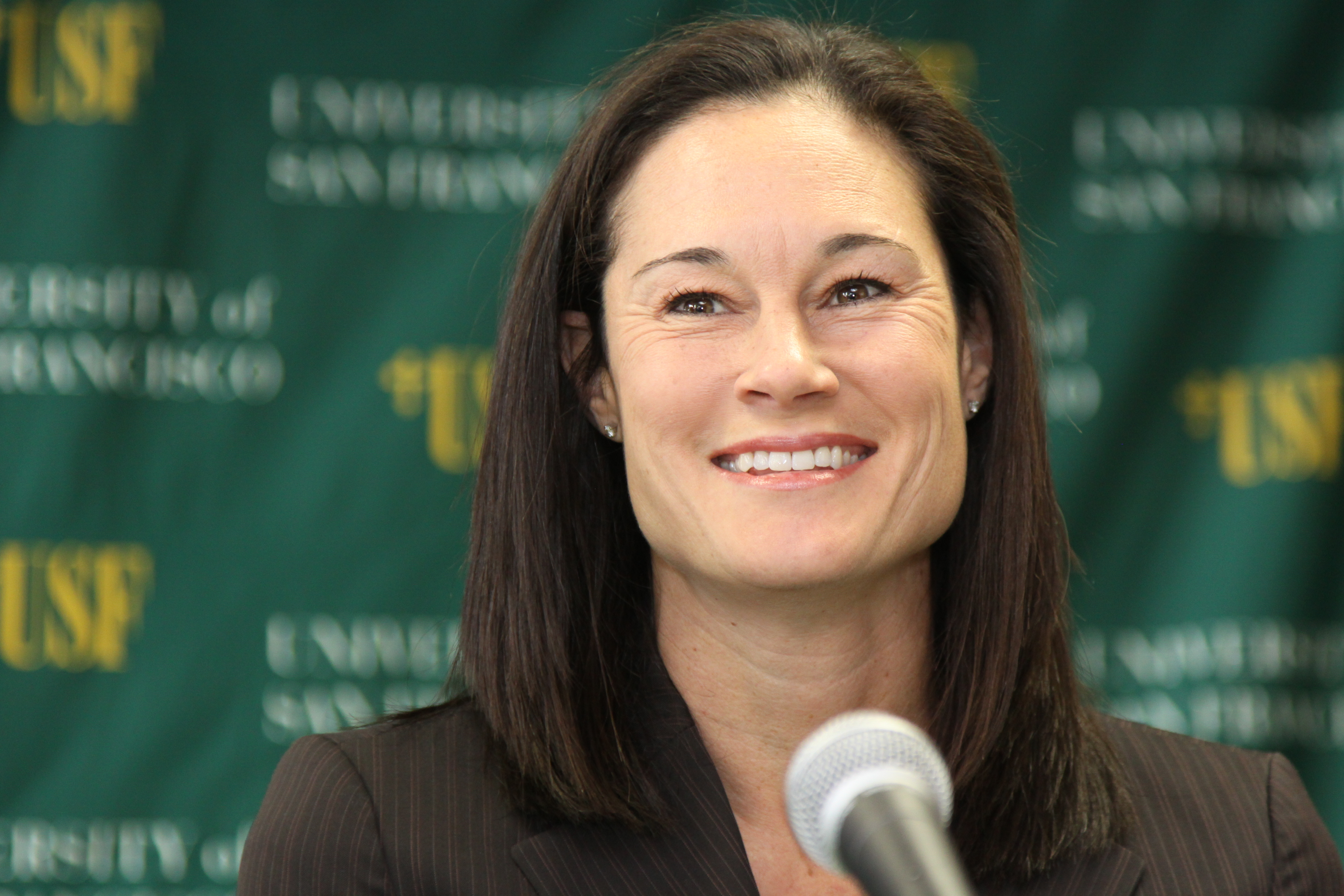
Jennifer Azzi won in 1990 while playing for Stanford.

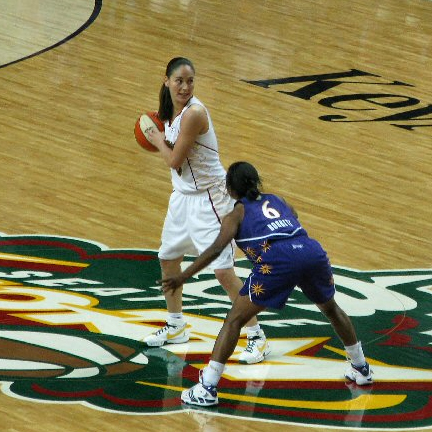
Sue Bird, in white, won in 2002, playing for Connecticut

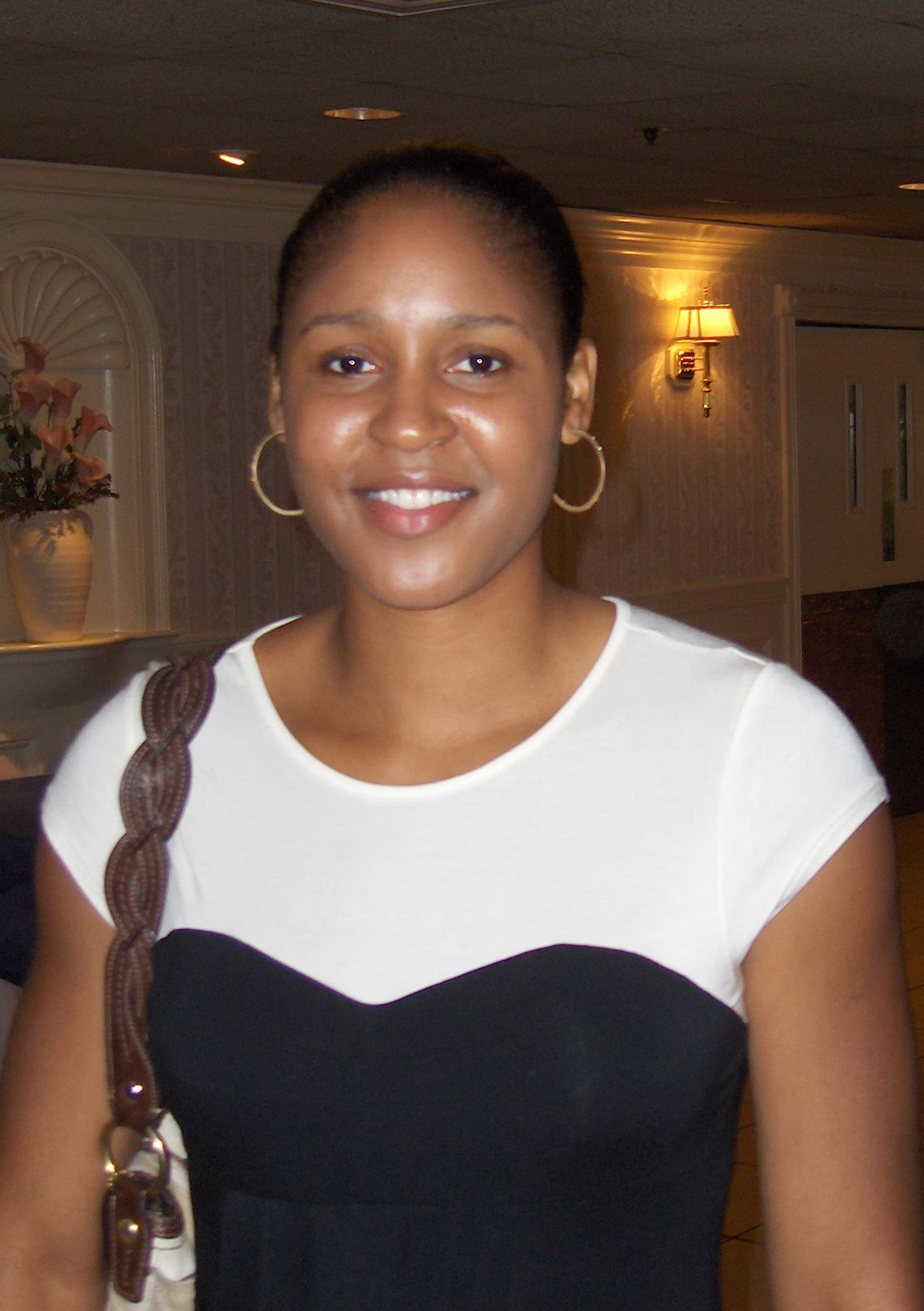
Maya Moore is the award's only three-time recipient.

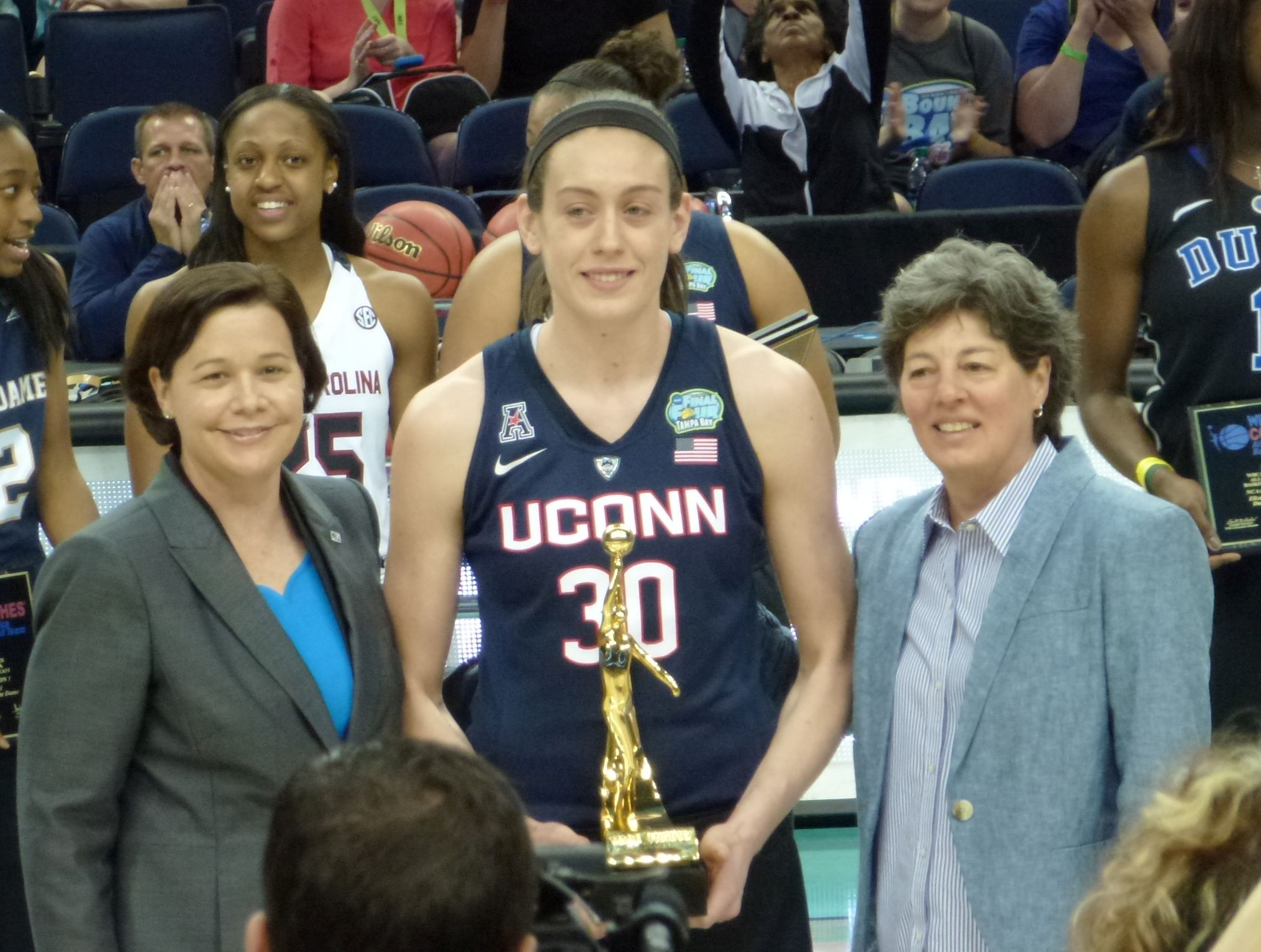
Breanna Stewart receiving the Wade Trophy at the 2015 WBCA convention in Tampa Bay FL

Player (n)	Denotes the number of times the player has been awarded the Wade Trophy at that point

Season	Player	School	Position	Class	Ref.
1977–78	Carol Blazejowski	Montclair State	Forward	Senior	
1978–79	Nancy Lieberman	Old Dominion	Guard	Junior	
1979–80	Nancy Lieberman (2)	Old Dominion	Guard	Senior	
1980–81	Lynette Woodard	Kansas	Guard	Senior	
1981–82	Pam Kelly	Louisiana Tech	Center	Senior	
1982–83	LaTaunya Pollard	Long Beach State	Guard	Senior	
1983–84	Janice Lawrence Braxton	Louisiana Tech	Forward	Senior	
1984–85	Cheryl Miller	USC	Forward	Junior	
1985–86	Kamie Ethridge	Texas	Guard	Senior	
1986–87	Shelly Pennefather	Villanova	Forward	Senior	
1987–88	Teresa Weatherspoon	Louisiana Tech	Guard	Senior	
1988–89	Clarissa Davis	Texas	Forward	Senior	
1989–90	Jennifer Azzi	Stanford	Guard	Senior	
1990–91	Daedra Charles	Tennessee	Center	Senior	
1991–92	Susan Robinson	Penn State	Forward	Senior	
1992–93	Karen Jennings	Nebraska	Forward	Senior	
1993–94	Carol Ann Shudlick	Minnesota	Forward	Senior	
1994–95	Rebecca Lobo	UConn (Note: Official athletic brand name was "Connecticut" before 2013–14.)	Center	Senior	
1995–96	Jennifer Rizzotti	UConn	Guard	Senior	
1996–97	DeLisha Milton	Florida	Forward	Senior	
1997–98	Ticha Penicheiro	Old Dominion	Guard	Senior	
1998–99	Stephanie White	Purdue	Guard	Senior	
1999–00	Edwina Brown	Texas	Guard	Senior	
2000–01	Jackie Stiles	Southwest Missouri State (Note: Known since 2005 as Missouri State.)	Guard	Senior	
2001–02	Sue Bird	UConn	Guard	Senior	
2002–03	Diana Taurasi	UConn	Forward	Junior	
2003–04	Alana Beard	Duke	Guard	Senior	
2004–05	Seimone Augustus	LSU	Guard	Junior	
2005–06	Seimone Augustus (2)	LSU	Guard	Senior	
2006–07	Candace Parker	Tennessee	Center	Junior	
2007–08	Candice Wiggins	Stanford	Guard	Senior	
2008–09	Maya Moore	UConn	Forward	Sophomore	
2009–10	Maya Moore (2)	UConn	Forward	Junior	
2010–11	Maya Moore (3)	UConn	Forward	Senior	
2011–12	Brittney Griner	Baylor	Center	Junior	
2012–13	Brittney Griner (2)	Baylor	Center	Senior	
2013–14	Odyssey Sims	Baylor	Guard	Senior	
2014–15	Breanna Stewart	UConn	Forward	Junior	
2015–16	Breanna Stewart (2)	UConn	Forward	Senior	
2016–17	Kelsey Plum	Washington	Guard	Senior	
2017–18	A'ja Wilson	South Carolina	Forward	Senior	
2018–19	Sabrina Ionescu	Oregon	Guard	Junior	
2019–20	Sabrina Ionescu (2)	Oregon	Guard	Senior	
2020–21	NaLyssa Smith	Baylor	Forward	Junior	
2021–22	Aliyah Boston	South Carolina	Forward	Junior	
2022–23	Caitlin Clark	Iowa	Guard	Junior	
2023–24	Caitlin Clark (2)	Iowa	Guard	Senior	
2024–25	Paige Bueckers	UConn	Guard	Senior (redshirt)	
2025–26	Sarah Strong	UConn	Forward	Sophomore	

== See also ==
- List of sports awards honoring women
