= Jennifer White (basketball) =

American basketball coach

Playing career
- 1979–1983: Louisiana Tech

Coaching career (HC unless noted)
- 1985–1990: Louisiana Tech (asst.)
- 1990–1993: Texas (asst.)
- 2003–2012: St. Edward's

Head coaching record
- Overall: 91–155 (.370)

Accomplishments and honors

Championships
- As player: AIAW Division I Champion (1981); NCAA Division I Champion (1982); As assistant coach: NCAA Division I Champion (1988); 3× American South Conference Champion (1988, 1989, 1990); 3× American South Conference Tournament Champion (1988, 1989, 1990); Southwest Conference Champion (1993); As head coach: Heartland Conference Champion (2006)

Awards
- Heartland Conference Coach of the Year (2006)

Jennifer White is a former women's basketball program head coach at St. Edward's University. She played college basketball at Louisiana Tech University where she was a member of the 1981 AIAW Division I and 1982 NCAA Division I National Championship teams. White earned her undergraduate degree in physical education in 1983 and her master's degree in physical education in 1985; both at Louisiana Tech. In 1985 Louisiana Tech head coach Leon Barmore hired White as a full-time assistant coach; the Lady Techsters basketball would win the 1988 NCAA Division I National Championship. In 1990 White left Louisiana Tech to serve as an assistant coach for Jody Conradt at the University of Texas at Austin where she coached until 1993. She then worked a basketball training and conditioning programs for the PlayStrong division of Ironsmith Corporation in Austin, Texas. From 2003 to 2012, White had been with the St. Edward's women's basketball program as head coach and achieved a 91–155 record. White played high school basketball at Loretto High School in Tennessee. White has been a women’s basketball referee for the National Collegiate Athletic Association since 2012.

== Head coaching record ==
Record table
Season	Team	Overall	Conference	Standing	Postseason
St. Edward's Hilltoppers (Heartland Conference) (2003–present)
2003–2004	St. Edward's	10–15	5–7	5th	–
2004–2005	St. Edward's	7–20	5–7	T–5th	–
2005–2006	St. Edward's	15–12	9–3	T–1st	–
2006–2007	St. Edward's	9–18	6–4	T–2nd	–
2007–2008	St. Edward's	12–17	9–5	3rd	–
2008–2009	St. Edward's	15–13	9–5	4th	–
2009–2010	St. Edward's	9–20	6–8	T–4th	–
2010–2011	St. Edward's	10–18	2–8	5th	–
2011–2012	St. Edward's	4–22	1–11	7th	–
St. Edward's:		91–155	52–58		
Total:		91–155			
National champion Postseason invitational champion Conference regular season champion Conference regular season and conference tournament champion Division regular season champion Division regular season and conference tournament champion Conference tournament champion
