= Kurt Budke =

American basketball player-coach (1961–2011)

Biographical details
- Born: June 3, 1961; Salina, Kansas, U.S.
- Died: November 17, 2011 (aged 50); Perryville, Arkansas, U.S.
- Education: Barton County Community College; Washburn University; Wichita State University

Playing career
- 1979–1981: Barton County CC
- 1981–1983: Washburn

Coaching career (HC unless noted)
- 1983–1984: Washburn (men's GA)
- 1984–1988: Friends (men's asst.)
- 1988–1991: Kansas City Kansas CC (men's asst.)
- 1990–1991: Kansas City Kansas CC (interim HC)
- 1991–1993: Allen County CC
- 1993–2000: Trinity Valley CC
- 2000–2002: Louisiana Tech (assoc. HC)
- 2002–2005: Louisiana Tech
- 2005–2011: Oklahoma State

Head coaching record
- Overall: 468–157 (.749)

Accomplishments and honors

Championships
- 4× NJCAA Women's Basketball Champion (1994, 1996, 1997, 1999); 7× Texas East Conference Champion (1994–2000); 3× WAC Champion (2003, 2004, 2005); 2× WAC Tournament Champion (2003, 2004)

Awards
- All-KJCCC (1981); KJCCC East Coach of the Year (1993); 2× WBCA NJCAA Coach of the Year (1995, 1998); 4× Texas Coaches Association Coach of the Year (1994, 1996, 1997, 1999); 2× WAC Coach of the Year (2003, 2004); NJCAA Hall of Fame; Kansas Sports Hall of Fame; Barton Community College Hall of Fame
- Women's Basketball Hall of Fame

Kurt John Budke (June 3, 1961 – November 17, 2011) was an American college basketball coach. Budke was inducted into the Women's Basketball Hall of Fame in 2015. His final coaching job was as the head coach for the Oklahoma State Cowgirls basketball women's team from 2005 until his death in an aviation accident.

== Career ==
Prior to being named the women's basketball head coach of Oklahoma State in 2005, Budke had previously coached at Allen County Community College, Trinity Valley Community College, and Louisiana Tech. His teams reached 20 wins in each of his years, and had double digit losses in only one of his years, prior to his first year at Oklahoma State. At the junior college level, his record stands at 273–31 (.898), which is the highest winning percentage in NJCAA.

He was also a two time NJCAA coach of the year (1995, 1998). He was also the youngest coach ever to be inducted into the NJCAA Hall of Fame. From 2002 to 2005, he coached at Louisiana Tech, where he compiled an 80–16 record, highlighted by three consecutive NCAA tournament appearances. His first Louisiana Tech team finished 31–3, and ended the season with a national ranking of 6th. The Lady Techsters reeled off 29 consecutive victories, which is the fourth longest streak in the school's storied history. He was named the WAC coach of the year for his efforts.

In his five years as Oklahoma State's women's basketball head coach, his teams went 99–68, and made three NCAA tournament appearances, highlighted by a Sweet 16 run in the 2008 NCAA Women's Division I Basketball Tournament.

== Death ==
Budke was killed in an airplane accident on November 17, 2011, when the Piper PA-28 Cherokee light aircraft he was traveling in for a recruiting trip crashed near Perryville, Arkansas, killing all four on board.

The airplane was being piloted by Olin Branstetter, a former Oklahoma state senator and OSU graduate. Also on board were assistant coach Miranda Serna and Branstetter's wife Paula. Budke left behind a wife and three children, the oldest of which was a student at Oklahoma State.

== Head coaching record ==
Record table
Season	Team	Overall	Conference	Standing	Postseason
Kansas City Kansas Lady Blue Devils (Kansas Jayhawk Community College Conference) (1990–1991)
1990–91	Kansas City Kansas	3–27			
Kansas City Kansas:		3–27 (.100)			
Allen County Red Devils (Kansas Jayhawk Community College Conference) (1991–1993)
1991–92	Allen County	22–8			
1992–93	Allen County	25–7			
Allen County:		47–15 (.758)			
Trinity Valley Lady Cardinals (Texas East Conference) (1993–2000)
1993–94	Trinity Valley	35–1		1st	NJCAA Champions
1994–95	Trinity Valley	31–1		1st	NJCAA Runner-Up
1995–96	Trinity Valley	32–4		1st	NJCAA Champions
1996–97	Trinity Valley	34–2		1st	NJCAA Champions
1997–98	Trinity Valley	34–1		1st	NJCAA Runner-Up
1998–99	Trinity Valley	36–0		1st	NJCAA Champions
1999–00	Trinity Valley	24–6		1st	NJCAA Region XIV Finals
Trinity Valley:		226–16 (.934)	96–2 (.980)		
Louisiana Tech Lady Techsters (Western Athletic Conference) (2002–2005)
2002–03	Louisiana Tech	31–3	18–0	1st	NCAA Sweet Sixteen
2003–04	Louisiana Tech	29–3	17–1	1st	NCAA Sweet Sixteen
2004–05	Louisiana Tech	20–10	14–4	T–1st	NCAA First Round
Louisiana Tech:		80–16 (.833)	49–5 (.907)		
Oklahoma State Cowgirls (Big 12 Conference) (2005–2011)
2005–06	Oklahoma State	6–22	0–16	12th	
2006–07	Oklahoma State	20–11	8–8	6th	NCAA First Round
2007–08	Oklahoma State	27–8	11–5	T–3rd	NCAA Sweet Sixteen
2008–09	Oklahoma State	17–16	4–12	T–10th	WNIT Second Round
2009–10	Oklahoma State	24–11	9–7	T–6th	NCAA Second Round
2010–11	Oklahoma State	17–15	4–12	11th	WNIT Second Round
2011	Oklahoma State	1–0	–	–	–
Oklahoma State:		112–83 (.574)	36–60 (.375)		
Total:		468–157 (.749)			
National champion Postseason invitational champion Conference regular season champion Conference regular season and conference tournament champion Division regular season champion Division regular season and conference tournament champion Conference tournament champion
