= Adrienne Johnson (basketball, born 1989) =

American basketball player (born 1989)

Adrienne Sanaa Johnson
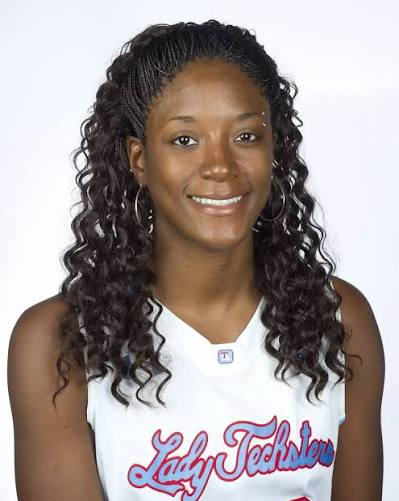
- Johnson during her senior season at Louisiana Tech (2011) via Latechsports.com

Personal information
- Born: January 18, 1989 (age 37) Lafayette, Louisiana, U.S.
- Listed height: 6 ft 0 in (1.83 m)

Career information
- High school: Franklin Senior High School (Franklin, Louisiana)
- College: Louisiana Tech University
- WNBA draft: 2011: 3rd round, 28th overall pick
- Drafted by: Connecticut Sun
- Playing career: 2011–2014
- Position: Forward
- Number: 33

Career history
- 2011: Connecticut Sun
- 2012: Dunav 8806 (Bulgaria)
- 2013: Le Mura de Lucca (Italy)
- 2014: CUS Cagliari (Italy)

Career highlights
- Selected in 2011 WNBA Draft (28th overall); Western Athletic Conference Player of the Year (2011); 3× First-Team All-WAC (2009–2011); 3× WAC All-Defensive Team (2009–2011); LSWA Louisiana State Player of the Year (2011); WBCA All-Region 7 Team (2011); State Farm Coaches’ All-American Honorable Mention (2011); AP All-American Honorable Mention (2011); State Farm Wade Trophy Watch List (2011); Louisiana Gatorade Player of the Year (2007)
- Stats at Basketball Reference

Adrienne Sanaa Johnson (born January 18, 1989) is an American former professional basketball player who competed in the WNBA and in European leagues in Bulgaria and Italy. Johnson was a four-time All-State selection, a multi-event LHSAA track and field champion, and the 2007 Louisiana Gatorade Player of the Year.

She played college basketball at Louisiana Tech University under Hall of Famer Teresa Weatherspoon. Johnson finished her collegiate career ranked fifth all-time in scoring (1,985 points), eighth in blocks (156), and fourth in 20-point games.

Johnson is the most recent Lady Techster to be selected in the WNBA Draft, chosen by the Connecticut Sun with the 28th overall pick in 2011.

In 2025, Johnson was named to the Louisiana Tech Lady Techsters All-Quarter Century Team.

== High school career ==
Johnson attended Franklin Senior High School, where she competed in basketball, track and field, volleyball, and softball. She earned four All-State selections in basketball and helped lead Franklin to:

- LHSAA Class 3A State Championship (2004)
- LHSAA Class 3A State Championship (2005)
- LHSAA Class 3A State Runner-up (2006)
- LHSAA Class 3A State Finals appearance (2007)

== Track and field ==
Johnson excelled in multiple jumping events, winning several state titles.

She won:

- LHSAA Class 3A Triple Jump State Championship (2006)
- LHSAA Class 3A High Jump State Championship (2006)
- LHSAA Class 3A Triple Jump State Championship (2007)
- LHSAA Class 3A High Jump State Runner-Up (2007)

== College career ==
Johnson played at Louisiana Tech from 2007 to 2011 under Hall of Famer Teresa Weatherspoon. She developed into one of the top forwards in the Western Athletic Conference, earning first-team All-WAC honors for three straight seasons and ranking among the program’s all-time leaders in scoring, blocks, and 20-point games.

She was a three-time First-Team All-WAC selection (2009–2011) and a three-time WAC All-Defensive Team honoree (2009–2011), establishing herself as one of the league’s most dominant two-way forwards.

During her senior season (2010–11), Johnson averaged 21.9 points and 9.4 rebounds per game while earning:

- Western Athletic Conference Player of the Year
- LSWA Louisiana State Player of the Year
- WBCA All-Region 7 Team
- State Farm Coaches’ All-America Honorable Mention
- AP All-American Honorable Mention
- State Farm Wade Trophy Watch List

Johnson ended her collegiate career ranked fifth all-time in scoring (1,985 points), eighth in blocks (156), and fourth in 20-point games (41).

== Career statistics ==
=== College ===
Louisiana Tech statistics
Season	GP	GS	MIN	MIN/G	FG	FGA	FG%	3PT	3PA	3P%	FT	FTA	FT%	OFF	DEF	REB	REB/G	PF	FO	AST	AST/G	TO	BLK	STL	PTS	PTS/G
2007–08	31	3	650	21.0	105	254	.413	8	23	.348	25	35	.714	67	96	163	5.3	65	1	23	0.7	62	30	23	243	7.8
2008–09	34	34	1122	33.0	211	454	.465	2	17	.118	103	143	.720	105	138	243	7.1	101	1	26	0.8	121	46	59	527	15.5
2009–10	32	32	1057	33.0	189	395	.478	2	7	.286	133	175	.760	90	139	229	7.2	85	3	63	2.0	96	51	42	513	16.0
2010–11	32	32	1188	37.1	256	501	.511	14	36	.389	176	210	.838	102	199	301	9.4	94	3	45	1.4	96	29	67	702	21.9
Career	129	101	4017	31.1	761	1604	.475	26	83	.313	437	563	.776	364	572	936	7.3	345	8	157	1.2	375	156	191	1985	15.4

== Professional career ==
=== WNBA ===
Johnson was selected by the Connecticut Sun with the 28th overall pick in the 2011 WNBA Draft.

She was waived by the Sun in May 2011.

After leaving the Sun, Johnson signed to play professionally overseas.

=== Overseas ===
Johnson played professionally in Europe:

- In 2012, she joined Dunav 8806 in Bulgaria.
- In 2013, she played for Le Mura de Lucca in Italy’s Serie A1 league.
- In 2014, she signed with CUS Cagliari in the Italian Serie A1.
