= 1982–83 USC Trojans women's basketball team =

Intercollegiate basketball season

1982–83 USC Trojans women's basketball

NCAA tournament National champions WCAA champions
- Conference: Western Collegiate Athletic Association

Ranking
- AP: No. 2
- Record: 31–2 (13–1 WCAA)
- Head coach: Linda Sharp (6th season)
- Home arena: L.A. Sports Arena

1982–83 West Coast Athletic Association women's basketball standings
	Conf.				Overall
Team	W		L	PCT	W		L	PCT
No. 2 USC	13	–	1	.929	31	–	2	.939
No. 7 Long Beach State	12	–	2	.857	24	–	7	.774
Arizona State	9	–	5	.643	23	–	7	.767
UCLA	9	–	5	.643	18	–	11	.621
Cal State Fullerton	7	–	10	.412	13	–	15	.464
Stanford	5	–	9	.357	19	–	16	.543
San Diego State	3	–	11	.214	10	–	18	.357
Arizona	2	–	12	.143	10	–	17	.370
As of April 5, 1983; Rankings from AP Poll

The 1982–83 USC Trojans women's basketball team represented the University of Southern California during the 1982–83 NCAA Division I women's basketball season. The squad was led by sixth-year head coach Linda Sharp and superstar freshman Cheryl Miller. The Trojans played their home games at the L.A. Sports Arena and were an NCAA independent.

The Women of Troy finished the regular season with a 26–2 record and the No. 2 ranking in the AP poll. As the top seed in the West region of the NCAA tournament, USC played the entire regional in their home city of Los Angeles. The team defeated Northeast Louisiana, Arizona State, and Long Beach State to earn the school's first Final Four appearance. In the national semifinals, USC easily defeated Georgia, 81–57. In the National Championship Game, the Trojans played No. 1 and two-time defending champion (1 AIAW, 1 NCAA), Louisiana Tech, winning 69–67 to break the Lady Techsters championship hold and earn the program's first NCAA title.

== Previous season ==
The 1981–82 USC Trojans women's basketball team finished with an overall record of 23–4 and a No. 6 ranking in the final AP poll. They reached the Elite Eight of the inaugural women's NCAA tournament before losing to No. 8 Tennessee, 91–90 in overtime.

== Roster ==
1982–83 USC Trojans women's basketball team
Players
Coaches

Pos.	#	Name	Height	Year	Previous school	Hometown
F	11	Paula McGee	6 ft 3 in (1.91 m)	So	Flint Northern	Flint, Michigan
G	15	Juliette Robinson	5 ft 9 in (1.75 m)	Jr		Long Beach, California
G	21	Rhonda Windham	—	Fr	John F. Kennedy	Bronx, New York
G	22	M'Lis Ward	5 ft 8 in (1.73 m)	Fr	Whitney M. Young	Chicago, Illinois
F	30	Pamela McGee	6 ft 3 in (1.91 m)	So	Flint Northern	Flint, Michigan
F	31	Cheryl Miller	6 ft 2 in (1.88 m)	Fr	Riverside Polytechnic	Riverside, California
G	44	Cynthia Cooper	5 ft 10 in (1.78 m)	Fr	Locke	Los Angeles, California

Head coach

- Linda Sharp (Cal State Fullerton)

Assistant coach(es)

Legend

- (C) Team captain
- (S) Suspended
- (I) Ineligible
- (W) Walk-on
- Injured
- Current redshirt

Roster

== Schedule ==
Date time, TV	Rank^{#}	Opponent^{#}	Result	Record	Site city, state
Regular season
Dec 29, 1982*	No. 1	No. 4 Old Dominion; Winston Tire Classic	W 75–47	9–0	L.A. Sports Arena; Los Angeles, California
NCAA tournament
Mar 18, 1983*	(1 W) No. 2	(8 W) Northeast Louisiana; First round	W 99–85	27–2	L.A. Sports Arena; Los Angeles, California
Mar 25, 1983*	(1 W) No. 2	vs. (4 W) No. 12 Arizona State; Regional Semifinal – Sweet Sixteen	W 96–59	28–2	Pauley Pavilion; Los Angeles, California
Mar 27, 1983*	(1 W) No. 2	vs. (2 W) No. 7 Long Beach State; Regional Final – Elite Eight	W 81–74	29–2	Pauley Pavilion; Los Angeles, California
Apr 1, 1983*	(1 W) No. 2	vs. (2 ME) No. 8 Georgia; National Semifinal – Final Four	W 81–57	30–2	Norfolk Scope (8,866); Norfolk, Virginia
Apr 3, 1983*	(1 W) No. 2	vs. (1 MW) No. 1 Louisiana Tech; National Championship	W 69–67	31–2	Norfolk Scope (7,387); Norfolk, Virginia
*Non-conference game. ^{#}Rankings from AP Poll. (#) Tournament seedings in parentheses. All times are in Pacific Time.

Source: USCTrojans.com

== Rankings ==
Ranking movements Legend: ██ Increase in ranking ██ Decrease in ranking
	Week																
Poll	1	2	3	4	5	6	7	8	9	10	11	12	13	14	15	16	Final
AP	1	1	1	1	1	1	1	1	1	2	2	2	2	2	2	2	2
