= 1982 NCAA Division I women's basketball championship game =

Women's basketball championship game

NCAA Division I women's basketball championship game
National championship game
Louisiana Tech Lady Techsters	Cheyney State Wolves
(34–1)	(28–2)
76	62
Head coach: Sonja Hogg	Head coach: C. Vivian Stringer
- AP: 1
- AP: 2
	1st half	2nd half	Total
Louisiana Tech Lady Techsters	40	36	76
Cheyney State Wolves	26	36	62
- Date: March 28, 1982
- Venue: Norfolk Scope, Norfolk, Virginia
- MVP: Janice Lawrence, Louisiana Tech
- Attendance: 9,531

United States TV coverage
- Network: CBS
- Announcers: Frank Glieber (play-by-play) and Cathy Rush (analyst)

The 1982 NCAA Division I women's basketball championship game was the final game of the 1982 NCAA Division I women's basketball tournament. It determined the champion of the 1981–82 NCAA Division I women's basketball season and was contested by the Louisiana Tech Lady Techsters and the Cheyney State Wolves. The game was played on March 28, 1982, at the Norfolk Scope in Norfolk, Virginia. No. 1 Louisiana Tech defeated No. 2 Cheyney State 76–62 to capture the inaugural NCAA national championship.

To date, Cheyney State is the only HBCU to reach the NCAA women's Final Four and play for an NCAA championship.

== Participants ==
=== Louisiana Tech Lady Techsters ===
The Lady Techsters, represented the Louisiana Tech University in Ruston, Louisiana, were led by head coach Sonja Hogg in her 8th season at the school. After winning the AIAW tournament championship the year prior, the Lady Techsters opened the season ranked No. 1 in the AP poll, a spot they would not relinquish. The team won their first 20 games of the season and extended their overall win streak to 54 games before losing at No. 7 Old Dominion.

In the inaugural NCAA tournament, Louisiana Tech defeated Tennessee Tech, Arizona State, and Kentucky to reach the Final Four. They won 69–46 over Tennessee in the national semifinal to reach the national championship game.

=== Cheyney State Wolves ===
The Wolves, represented Cheyney State College, a Division II school in Cheyney, Pennsylvania, were led by head coach C. Vivian Stringer in her 11th season at the school. They began the season No. 7 in the AP Poll and moved up to the No. 2 spot where they stayed for the final five rankings of the season.

Cheyney State received an invitation to the NCAA tournament and defeated Auburn, NC State, and Kansas State to reach the Final Four. The Wolves defeated No. 3 Maryland, 76–66, to extend their winning streak to 23 games and set up the championship game matchup with Louisiana Tech.

== Starting lineups ==
Louisiana Tech	Position	Cheyney State
Kim Mulkey	G	Paulette Bigelow
Angela Turner	G	Yolanda Laney
Pam Kelly	C	Faith Wilds
Janice Lawrence	F	Valerie Walker
Jennifer White	F	Debra Walker

== Game summary ==
Early in the game, Cheyney State played multiple zone defenses to confuse Louisiana Tech. The Wolves, who scored on 8 of their first 11 possessions, took a 16–8 lead after eight minutes. In need of a spark, Louisiana Tech employed a full court man-to-man press defense and substituted Debra Rodman into the game. The Lady Techsters regained the lead at 24–22 after a basket by Kim Mulkey and outscored Cheyney State 20–4 to close out the first half as Valerie Walker and Debra Walker had to sit with three fouls each.

Cheyney drew to within 8 points after a 16–10 run brought the score to 50–42 with 11:39 remaining. That's as close as the game would get down the stretch and Louisiana Tech took home the victory, 76–62.

CBS

March 28, 1982

No. 1 Louisiana Tech Lady Techsters 76, No. 2 Cheyney State Lady Wolves 62
Scoring by half: 40–26, 36–36
Pts: Lawrence 20; Rebs: Rodman 11; Asts: Mulkey	Pts: V. Walker 20; Rebs: Asts: Laney

Norfolk Scope – Norfolk, Virginia
Attendance: 9,531

== Media coverage ==
The game was broadcast on CBS.
