= 1983 NCAA Division I women's basketball championship game =

Women's basketball championship game

NCAA Division I women's basketball championship game
National championship game
Louisiana Tech Lady Techsters	USC Trojans
(31–1)	(30–2)
67	69
Head coach: Sonja Hogg and Leon Barmore	Head coach: Linda Sharp
- AP: 1
- AP: 2
	1st half	2nd half	Total
Louisiana Tech Lady Techsters	37	30	67
USC Trojans	26	43	69
- Date: April 3, 1983
- Venue: Norfolk Scope, Norfolk, Virginia
- MVP: Cheryl Miller, USC
- Referees: Peter Stewart, Kit Robinson
- Attendance: 7,387

United States TV coverage
- Network: CBS
- Announcers: Frank Glieber (play-by-play) and Ann Meyers (analyst)

The 1983 NCAA Division I women's basketball championship game was the final game of the 1983 NCAA Division I women's basketball tournament. It determined the champion of the 1982–83 NCAA Division I women's basketball season and was contested by the Louisiana Tech Lady Techsters and the USC Trojans. The game was played on April 3, 1983, at the Norfolk Scope in Norfolk, Virginia. No. 1 Louisiana Tech was defeated by No. 2 USC 69–67 to capture the program's first of back-to-back NCAA national championships.

== Participants ==
=== Louisiana Tech Lady Techsters ===
The Lady Techsters, who represented Louisiana Tech University in Ruston, Louisiana, were led by co-head coaches Sonja Hogg, in her 9th season at the school, and Leon Barmore, in his sixth season at the school (first as co-HC). After winning the inaugural NCAA tournament championship the year prior, the Lady Techsters opened the season ranked No. 2 in the AP poll. Halfway through the season, the Lady Techsters assumed the No. 1 ranking and remained in that spot for the duration of the season.

In the NCAA tournament, Louisiana Tech defeated Middle Tennessee State, Auburn, and Texas to reach the Final Four. They won 71–55 over No. 4 Old Dominion in the national semifinal to reach the national championship game with a 31–1 record.

=== USC Trojans ===
The Trojans, represented the University of Southern California in Los Angeles, California, were led by head coach Linda Sharp in her 6th season at the school. They began the season No. 1 in the AP Poll and fell slightly to the No. 2 spot where they stayed for the final eight rankings of the season. USC and Louisiana Tech were the only two women's teams to occupy the No. 1 ranking during the season.

USC was the top seed in the West region of the NCAA tournament and defeated NE Louisiana, Arizona State, and Long Beach State to reach the Final Four. The Trojans defeated No. 8 Georgia, 81–57, to move to 30–2 and set up the championship game matchup with Louisiana Tech.

== Starting lineups ==
Louisiana Tech	Position	USC
Kim Mulkey	G	Rhonda Windham
Lori Scott	G	Cynthia Cooper
Debra Rodman	F	Pamela McGee
Janice Lawrence	F	Paula McGee
Jennifer White	F	Cheryl Miller

== Game summary ==
CBS

April 3, 1983

No. 1 Louisiana Tech Lady Techsters 67, No. 2 USC Trojans 69
Scoring by half: 37–26, 30–43
Pts: Lawrence 20; Rebs: Rodman 11; Asts: Mulkey	Pts: Miller 27; Rebs: Asts:

Norfolk Scope – Norfolk, Virginia
Attendance: 7,387
Referees: Peter Stewart, Kit Robinson

== Media coverage ==
The game was broadcast on CBS.
