= 1982–83 Louisiana Tech Lady Techsters basketball team =

1982-83 Louisiana Tech women's basketball season

1982–83 Louisiana Tech Lady Techsters basketball

NCAA tournament, Runner-Up
- Conference: Independent

Ranking
- AP: No. 1
- Record: 31–2
- Head coach: Sonja Hogg (9th season); Leon Barmore (1st season)
- Assistant coach: Gary Blair
- Home arena: Thomas Assembly Center

The 1982–83 Louisiana Tech Lady Techsters basketball team represented Louisiana Tech University during the 1982–83 NCAA Division I women's basketball season. The team was led by co-head coaches Sonja Hogg and Leon Barmore, who guided the team to a 31–2 record and a runner-up finish at the 1983 NCAA tournament. This was the program's third consecutive appearance in the championship game, following an AIAW championship in 1981 and the first NCAA championship in 1982. The team played their home games for the inaugural season at the Thomas Assembly Center in Ruston, Louisiana as an NCAA independent.

== Previous season ==
The Lady Techsters finished the 1981–82 season with a 35–1 record as an independent. They won the inaugural NCAA tournament championship over Cheney State, 76–62.

The Lady Techsters won their first 20 games of the season to extend the program's win streak to 54 games. Louisiana Tech lost at Old Dominion, 61–58, but re-focused to close the season with a 15-game win streak to capture the inaugural NCAA women's basketball championship.

== Roster ==
1982–83 Louisiana Tech Lady Techsters women's basketball team
Players
Coaches

Pos.	#	Name	Height	Year	Hometown
G	10	Julie Wilkerson	5 ft 8 in (1.73 m)	Sr	Tioga, Louisiana
G	15	Jennifer White	5 ft 9 in (1.75 m)	Sr	Loretto, Tennessee
G	20	Kim Mulkey	5 ft 4 in (1.63 m)	Jr	Hammond, Louisiana
F	25	Lori Scott	5 ft 10 in (1.78 m)	Sr	Jackson, Mississippi
G	34	Debbie Primeaux	5 ft 2 in (1.57 m)	Jr	Bell City, Louisiana
F	44	Debra Rodman	6 ft 2 in (1.88 m)	Jr	Dallas, Texas
C	51	Janice Lawrence	6 ft 3 in (1.91 m)	Jr	Lucedale, Mississippi

Head coach

- Sonja Hogg
- Leon Barmore

Assistant coach(es)

- Gary Blair

Legend

- (C) Team captain
- (S) Suspended
- (I) Ineligible
- (W) Walk-on
- Injured
- Current redshirt

== Schedule and results ==
Date time, TV	Rank^{#}	Opponent^{#}	Result	Record	Site (attendance) city, state
Regular season
NCAA tournament
Mar 25, 1983*	(1 MW) No. 1	vs. (5 MW) No. 14 Auburn; Regional Semifinal – Sweet Sixteen	W 81–54	29–1	Thomas Assembly Center; Ruston, Louisiana
Mar 27, 1983*	(1 MW) No. 1	vs. (2 MW) No. 3 Texas; Regional Final – Elite Eight	W 72–58	30–1	Thomas Assembly Center; Ruston, Louisiana
Apr 1, 1983*	(1 MW) No. 1	vs. (1 E) No. 4 Old Dominion; National Semifinal – Final Four	W 71–55	31–1	Norfolk Scope; Norfolk, Virginia
Apr 3, 1983*	(1 MW) No. 1	vs. (2 W) No. 2 USC; National Championship	L 67–69	31–2	Norfolk Scope (7,387); Norfolk, Virginia
*Non-conference game. ^{#}Rankings from AP Poll. (#) Tournament seedings in parentheses. MW=Midwest. All times are in Central.

== Rankings ==
Ranking movements Legend: ██ Increase in ranking ██ Decrease in ranking
	Week																
Poll	1	2	3	4	5	6	7	8	9	10	11	12	13	14	15	16	Final
AP	2	2	2	2	2	2	2	2	2	1	1	1	1	1	1	1	1
