= MLIS =

MLIS may mean:

- Molecular laser isotope separation, an isotope separation method
- Master of Library and Information Science, a master's degree in the United States and Canada
- Microlissencephaly, a brain development disorder
- Major League Indoor Soccer (2022-present), a sports league founded in 2022
- M'Lis Ward, American pilot
