= 1982–83 Clemson Tigers women's basketball team =

Women's college basketball season

1982–83 Clemson Tigers women's basketball
- Conference: Atlantic Coast Conference
- Record: 12–17 (5–8 ACC)
- Head coach: Annie Tribble (7th season)
- Home arena: Littlejohn Coliseum

The 1982–83 Clemson Tigers women's basketball team represented Clemson University during the 1982–83 NCAA Division I women's basketball season. The Tigers were led by seventh year head coach Annie Tribble. The Tigers, members of the Atlantic Coast Conference, played their home games at Littlejohn Coliseum.

== Schedule ==
Date time, TV	Rank^{#}	Opponent^{#}	Result	Record	Site city, state
November 29, 1982*		Jackson State	W 64–63	1–0	Littlejohn Coliseum; Clemson, South Carolina
December 1, 1982		Duke	L 70–72	1–1 (0–1)	Littlejohn Coliseum; Clemson, South Carolina
December 8, 1982*		at No. 15 South Carolina rivalry	L 58–73	1–2 (0–1)	Carolina Coliseum; Columbia, South Carolina
December 11, 1982		No. 3 Maryland	L 71–79	1–3 (0–2)	Littlejohn Coliseum; Clemson, South Carolina
December 15, 1982*		No. 11 Georgia	L 65–90	1–4 (0–2)	Littlejohn Coliseum; Clemson, South Carolina
December 18, 1982*		Winthrop	W 74–54	2–4 (0–2)	Littlejohn Coliseum; Clemson, South Carolina
January 5, 1983*		No. 11 Kansas State	L 72–92	2–5 (0–2)	Littlejohn Coliseum; Clemson, South Carolina
January 7, 1983		No. 20 NC State	L 66–83	2–6 (0–3)	Littlejohn Coliseum; Clemson, South Carolina
January 10, 1983*		at No. 2 Louisiana Tech	L 71–98	2–7 (0–3)	Thomas Assembly Center; Ruston, Louisiana
January 14, 1983*		Mississippi State; Clemson Lady Tiger Invitational	L 59–64	2–8 (0–3)	Littlejohn Coliseum; Clemson, South Carolina
January 15, 1983*		No. 15 Auburn; Clemson Lady Tiger Invitational	L 60–71	2–9 (0–3)	Littlejohn Coliseum; Clemson, South Carolina
January 17, 1983*		at Tennessee Tech	W 68–67	3–9 (0–3)	Eblen Center; Cookeville, Tennessee
January 19, 1983*		South Carolina State	W 87–76	4–9 (0–3)	Littlejohn Coliseum; Clemson, South Carolina
January 22, 1983		at Virginia	W 76–71	5–9 (1–3)	University Hall; Charlottesville, Virginia
January 24, 1983*		South Carolina rivalry	W 89–73	6–9 (1–3)	Littlejohn Coliseum; Clemson, South Carolina
January 27, 1983		at Georgia Tech	W 79–67	7–9 (2–3)	Alexander Memorial Coliseum; Atlanta, Georgia
January 29, 1983		at Duke	L 81–95	7–10 (2–4)	Cameron Indoor Stadium; Durham, North Carolina
February 2, 1983		North Carolina	L 80–84	7–11 (2–5)	Littlejohn Coliseum; Clemson, South Carolina
February 5, 1983		Georgia Tech	W 84–66	8–11 (3–5)	Littlejohn Coliseum; Clemson, South Carolina
February 9, 1983		at No. 19 NC State	L 67–99	8–12 (3–6)	Reynolds Coliseum; Raleigh, North Carolina
February 12, 1983*		vs. No. 5 Cheyney State; East Carolina Lady Pirate Classic	L 66–80	8–13 (3–6)	Williams Arena at Minges Coliseum; Greenville, North Carolina
February 13, 1983*		vs. Detroit Mercy; East Carolina Lady Pirate Classic	W 83–58	9–13 (3–6)	Williams Arena at Minges Coliseum; Greenville, North Carolina
February 16, 1983		at No. 6 Maryland	L 67–85	9–14 (3–7)	Cole Field House; College Park, Maryland
February 23, 1983		Virginia	W 86–84 ^{OT}	10–14 (4–7)	Littlejohn Coliseum; Clemson, South Carolina
February 24, 1983		Wake Forest	W 103–71	11–14 (5–7)	Littlejohn Coliseum; Clemson, South Carolina
February 26, 1983		at No. 20 North Carolina	L 74–85	11–15 (5–8)	Carmichael Arena; Chapel Hill, North Carolina
February 28, 1983*		at No. 12 Georgia	L 64–105	11–16 (5–8)	Stegeman Coliseum; Athens, Georgia
ACC Tournament
March 4, 1983*		vs. Duke; ACC Tournament quarterfinal	W 93–92 ^{OT}	12–16 (5–8)	Civic Center; Fayetteville, North Carolina
March 5, 1983*		vs. No. 16 NC State; ACC Tournament semifinal	L 87–103	12–17 (5–8)	Civic Center; Fayetteville, North Carolina
*Non-conference game. ^{#}Rankings from AP Poll. (#) Tournament seedings in parentheses.
