= 1982–83 Georgia Lady Bulldogs basketball team =

Intercollegiate basketball season

1982–83 Georgia Lady Bulldogs basketball

SEC tournament champions

NCAA tournament, Final Four
- Conference: Southeastern Conference

Ranking
- AP: No. 8
- Record: 27–7 (4–4 SEC)
- Head coach: Andy Landers (4th season)
- Home arena: Stegeman Coliseum

1982–83 SEC women's basketball standings
	Conf.				Overall
Team	W		L	PCT	W		L	PCT
Eastern Division
No. 9 Tennessee	7	–	1	.875	25	–	8	.758
No. 11 Kentucky	6	–	2	.750	23	–	5	.821
No. 8 Georgia ^{†}	4	–	4	.500	27	–	7	.794
Vanderbilt	2	–	6	.250	12	–	14	.462
Florida	1	–	7	.125	11	–	16	.407
Western Division
No. 13 Ole Miss	6	–	2	.750	26	–	6	.813
No. 14 Auburn	6	–	2	.750	24	–	8	.750
No. 20 LSU	6	–	2	.750	20	–	7	.741
Alabama	2	–	6	.250	16	–	13	.552
Mississippi State	0	–	8	.000	15	–	13	.536
† 1983 SEC tournament winner Rankings from AP poll

The 1982–83 Georgia Lady Bulldogs women's basketball team represented the University of Georgia during the 1982–83 college basketball season. The Lady Bulldogs, led by fourth-year head coach Andy Landers, played their home games at Stegeman Coliseum and were members of the Southeastern Conference. They finished the season 27–7, 4–4 in SEC play to finish third in the Eastern division standings. The Lady Bulldogs won the SEC tournament. Georgia was the No. 2 seed in the Midwest region of the NCAA tournament. They defeated North Carolina, Indiana, and No. 1 seed Tennessee to reach the first NCAA Final Four in program history. In the National semifinal game, Georgia was defeated by the eventual National champions, USC.

== Roster ==
1982–83 Georgia Bulldogs women's basketball team
Players
Coaches

Pos.	#	Name	Height	Year	Previous school	Hometown
G/F	5	Teresa Edwards	5 ft 11 in (1.8 m)	Fr	Cairo HS	Cairo, Georgia
F	43	Lisa O'Connor	6 ft 1 in (1.85 m)	Fr		Cartersville, Georgia
F/C	45	Janet Harris	6 ft 3 in (1.91 m)	So	John Marshall	Chicago, Illinois

Head coach

Andy Landers

Assistant coach(es)

Legend

- (C) Team captain
- (S) Suspended
- (I) Ineligible
- (W) Walk-on
- Injured
- Current redshirt

== Schedule ==
Date time, TV	Rank^{#}	Opponent^{#}	Result	Record	Site (attendance) city, state
Regular season
Nov 26, 1982	No. 7	No. 14 Rutgers; Crush Classic	W 76–61	1–0	Chicago, Illinois
Nov 27, 1982	No. 7	UCLA; Crush Classic	L 57–75	1–1	Chicago, Illinois
Dec 1, 1982*		Berry	W 90–67	2–1	Stegeman Coliseum; Athens, Georgia
Dec 4, 1982*		Georgia Tech	W 90–56	3–1	Stegeman Coliseum; Athens, Georgia
Dec 11, 1982	No. 13	Florida	W 88–66	4–1 (1–0)	Stegeman Coliseum; Athens, Georgia
Dec 15, 1982*	No. 11	at Clemson	W 90–65	5–1	Littlejohn Coliseum; Clemson, South Carolina
Dec 30, 1982*		vs. Minnesota; Dial Soap Classic	W 65–61	6–1	Miami, Florida
Dec 31, 1982*		vs. Appalachian State; Dial Soap Classic	W 94–32	7–1	Miami, Florida
Jan 3, 1983*		at Georgia State	W 97–42	8–1	Atlanta, Georgia
Jan 6, 1983*		Kansas State	W 88–67	9–1	Marietta, Georgia
Jan 8, 1983	No. 10	Vanderbilt	W 76–70	10–1 (2–0)	Stegeman Coliseum; Athens, Georgia
Jan 10, 1983	No. 10	at Florida	W 76–60	11–1 (3–0)	O'Connell Center; Gainesville, Florida
Jan 11, 1983*	No. 10	at Mercer	W 80–66	12–1	Porter Gym; Macon, Georgia
Jan 16, 1983	No. 9	No. 8 Tennessee	L 54–74	12–2 (3–1)	Stegeman Coliseum; Athens, Georgia
Jan 21, 1983*		vs. East Carolina; Nike-Carolina Classic	W 80–61	13–2	Columbia, South Carolina
Jan 22, 1983*		at South Carolina; Nike-Carolina Classic	W 74–72	14–2	Columbia, South Carolina
Jan 26, 1983*		Georgia State	W 93–55	15–2	Stegeman Coliseum; Athens, Georgia
Jan 30, 1983	No. 10	at No. 7 Kentucky	L 59–66 ^{OT}	15–3 (3–2)	Rupp Arena; Lexington, Kentucky
Jan 31, 1983*		at Eastern Kentucky	W 68–54	16–3	Richmond, Kentucky
Feb 6, 1983	No. 10	at Vanderbilt	L 62–63	16–4 (3–3)	Memorial Gymnasium; Nashville, Tennessee
Feb 7, 1983*		at Tennessee Tech	W 72–61	17–4	Cookeville, Tennessee
Feb 9, 1983*		Chattanooga	W 74–60	18–4	Stegeman Coliseum; Athens, Georgia
Feb 12, 1983	No. 12	at No. 6 Tennessee	L 59–73	18–5 (3–4)	Stokely Athletic Center; Knoxville, Tennessee
Feb 14, 1983*	No. 12	at No. 14 Auburn	L 54–58	18–6	Memorial Coliseum; Auburn, Alabama
Feb 20, 1983	No. 12	No. 8 Kentucky	W 99–81	19–6 (4–4)	Stegeman Coliseum; Athens, Georgia
Feb 26, 1983*	No. 12	Mercer	W 78–66 ^{OT}	20–6	Stegeman Coliseum; Athens, Georgia
Feb 28, 1983*	No. 12	Clemson	W 105–64	21–6	Stegeman Coliseum; Athens, Georgia
SEC tournament
Mar 3, 1983*	(3E) No. 12	vs. (3W) No. 19 LSU; Quarterfinals	W 79–78	22–6	Rupp Arena; Lexington, Kentucky
Mar 4, 1983*	(3E) No. 12	vs. (1E) No. 8 Tennessee; Semifinals	W 71–65	23–6	Rupp Arena; Lexington, Kentucky
Mar 5, 1983*	(3E) No. 12	vs. (1W) No. 15 Ole Miss; Championship game	W 72–69	24–6	Rupp Arena; Lexington, Kentucky
NCAA tournament
Mar 19, 1983*	(2 ME) No. 8	(7 ME) No. 18 North Carolina; First round	W 72–70	25–6	Stegeman Coliseum; Athens, Georgia
Mar 25, 1983*	(2 ME) No. 8	vs. (3 ME) Indiana; Regional Semifinal – Sweet Sixteen	W 86–70	26–6	Athletic & Convocation Center; Notre Dame, Indiana
Mar 27, 1983*	(2 ME) No. 8	vs. (1 ME) No. 9 Tennessee; Regional Final – Elite Eight	W 67–63	27–6	Athletic & Convocation Center; Notre Dame, Indiana
Apr 1, 1983*	(2 ME) No. 8	vs. (1 W) No. 2 USC; National Semifinal – Final Four	L 57–81	27–7	Norfolk Scope (8,866); Norfolk, Virginia
*Non-conference game. ^{#}Rankings from AP Poll. (#) Tournament seedings in parentheses. ME=Mideast. All times are in Eastern Time.

== Rankings ==
Ranking movements Legend: ██ Increase in ranking ██ Decrease in ranking
	Week																
Poll	1	2	3	4	5	6	7	8	9	10	11	12	13	14	15	16	Final
AP	7	12	13	11	10	9	10	8	9	9	10	10	12	12	12	8	8

== See also ==
1982–83 Georgia Bulldogs basketball team
