= Rhonda Windham =

American basketball player and manager

- Born: 1964 (age 61–62); The Bronx, New York, U.S.
- Occupations: Basketball player for USC; First general manager of the LA Sparks WNBA team
- Known for: Winner of the 1983 NCAA Division I women's basketball tournament; Frances Pomeroy Naismith Award winner; All Pac-10 Team (1987)

Rhonda Windham (born 1964) is an American former WNBA general manager of the Los Angeles Sparks from 1997 to 1999. Before joining the Sparks, Windham played basketball at the University of Southern California between 1982 and 1987. With USC, Windham scored 1,040 points and was the assists leader for each season except for 1984. During her last year in college, Windham played at the 1987 Summer Universiade and received the 1987 Frances Pomeroy Naismith Award.

After holding brief positions in the United States and Italy, Windham worked in public relations for the Los Angeles Lakers from 1990 to 1996. Upon the creation of the WNBA in 1997, Windham was the first ever general manager for the Sparks. Outside of professional basketball, Windham created the Say No Classic in 1991 and entered real estate investing in 2000.

== Early life and education ==
In 1964, Windham was born in The Bronx, New York. Windham competed in gymnastics and basketball as a child before focusing on basketball in secondary school. After playing in various parts of New York City, Windham went to the University of Southern California in the early 1980s to study communication. While at Southern California, Windham and her team won the 1983 NCAA Division I women's basketball tournament. Windham continued to play basketball until she injured her knee at the 1983 U.S. Olympic Festival. Windham took a year off from basketball until she returned in late 1984. In 1986, Windham was part of the USC team that was runner-up at the 1986 NCAA Division I women's basketball tournament.

Overall, Windham played in 122 games and scored 1,040 points with the Trojans. She held the record in assists for the Trojans each season between 1983 and 1987 except 1984. In 1987, Windham received the Frances Pomeroy Naismith Award from the Women's Basketball Coaches Association. Outside of the United States, Windham was part of the American team that finished fifth at the 1987 World University Games.

=== Southern California statistics ===
Note: The following stats:FG%, FT%, RBG, PPG, FG, FGA, FT, FTA, REB, PTS for 1984–85 reflect the first 26 games. The assists (A), and Assists per game (APG) reflect all 28 games.

Ratios
Year	Team	GP	FG%	FT%	RBG	APG	PPG
1982–83	Southern California	33	45.2%	68.0%	1.76	5.97	7.00
1983–84	Southern California	Medical redshirt					
1984–85	Southern California	28	38.7%	58.8%	2.96	6.89	6.31
1985–86	Southern California	36	50.4%	66.7%	1.86	4.75	8.94
1986–87	Southern California	26	52.2%	68.9%	2.12	6.69	11.81
Career		123	47.5%	66.2%	2.09	5.98	8.33

Totals
Year	Team	GP	FG	FGA	FT	FTA	REB	A	PTS
1982–83	Southern California	33	90	199	51	75	58	197	231
1983–84	Southern California	Medical redshirt							
1984–85	Southern California	28	67	173	30	51	77	193	164
1985–86	Southern California	36	136	270	50	75	67	171	322
1986–87	Southern California	26	128	245	51	74	55	174	307
Career		123	421	887	182	275	257	735	1024

== Career ==
After completing her post-secondary education, Windham briefly worked in marketing before trying out for the 1988 Summer Olympics. After she did not qualify for the American women's basketball team, Windham became a youth basketball coach in Italy that same year. After working in Italy for a year, Windham went back to the United States and worked in public relations. During her public relations career, Windham worked for the Los Angeles Lakers between 1990 and 1996. In January 1997, Windham was named the general manager of a Los Angeles team in the upcoming WNBA.

When the WNBA held their first games from June to July 1997, Windham was the first ever general manager for the Sparks. Windham continued to work as general manager of the Los Angeles Sparks until she was fired in 1999. Apart from professional basketball, Windham created a summer college basketball association called the Say No Classic in 1991. In the early 2000s, Windman expanded her career to real estate investing.
