= 1981–82 Clemson Tigers women's basketball team =

Women's college basketball season

1981–82 Clemson Tigers women's basketball

NCAA Tournament, first round
- Conference: Atlantic Coast Conference
- Record: 20–12 (6–3 ACC)
- Head coach: Annie Tribble (6th season)
- Home arena: Littlejohn Coliseum

The 1981–82 Clemson Tigers women's basketball team represented Clemson University during the 1981–82 NCAA Division I women's basketball season. The Tigers were led by sixth year head coach Annie Tribble. The Tigers, members of the Atlantic Coast Conference, played their home games at Littlejohn Coliseum.

== Schedule ==
Date time, TV	Rank^{#}	Opponent^{#}	Result	Record	Site city, state
November 26, 1981*	No. 16	vs. No. 15 Kansas; Wayland Baptist Classic	L 63–66	0–1	Hutcherson Center; Plainview, Texas
November 27, 1981*	No. 16	at Wayland Baptist; Wayland Baptist Classic	W 75–58	1–1	Hutcherson Center; Plainview, Texas
November 28, 1981*	No. 16	vs. Missouri; Wayland Baptist Classic	W 68–52	2–1	Hutcherson Center; Plainview, Texas
December 2, 1981*	No. 17	Appalachian State	W 94–71	3–1	Littlejohn Coliseum; Clemson, South Carolina
December 5, 1981*	No. 17	vs. National College; Pittsburgh Classic	W 79–62	4–1	Fitzgerald Field House; Pittsburgh, Pennsylvania
December 6, 1981*	No. 17	at Pittsburgh; Pittsburgh Classic	L 64–67	4–2	Fitzgerald Field House; Pittsburgh, Pennsylvania
December 12, 1981*	No. 17	No. 3 South Carolina rivalry	L 74–82	4–3	Littlejohn Coliseum; Clemson, South Carolina
December 14, 1981		Georgia Tech	W 72–50	5–3 (1–0)	Littlejohn Coliseum; Clemson, South Carolina
December 17, 1981*		vs. Belhaven; South Florida Invitational	W 78–52	6–3 (1–0)	USF Sun Dome; Tampa, Florida
December 18, 1981*		vs. UNC–Charlotte; South Florida Invitational	W 80–61	7–3 (1–0)	USF Sun Dome; Tampa, Florida
December 19, 1981*		vs. Miami; South Florida Invitational	W 74–59	8–3 (1–0)	USF Sun Dome; Tampa, Florida
January 4, 1982		at Wake Forest	W 89–62	9–3 (2–0)	Winston-Salem War Memorial Coliseum; Winston-Salem, North Carolina
January 9, 1982		No. 7 NC State	W 94–75	10–3 (3–0)	Littlejohn Coliseum; Clemson, South Carolina
January 12, 1982		at No. 9 Maryland	L 76–95	10–4 (3–1)	Cole Field House; College Park, Maryland
January 16, 1982*		Francis Marion; Clemson Lady Tiger Invitational	W 92–79	11–4 (3–1)	Littlejohn Coliseum; Clemson, South Carolina
January 17, 1982*		UAB; Clemson Lady Tiger Invitational	L 80–93	11–5 (3–1)	Littlejohn Coliseum; Clemson, South Carolina
January 21, 1982*		at Tennessee	L 60–91	11–6 (3–1)	Stokely Athletic Center; Knoxville, Tennessee
January 23, 1982		Duke	W 84–59	12–6 (4–1)	Littlejohn Coliseum; Clemson, South Carolina
January 25, 1982*		No. 1 Louisiana Tech	L 63–68	12–7 (4–1)	Littlejohn Coliseum; Clemson, South Carolina
January 27, 1982		at North Carolina	L 68–82	12–8 (4–2)	Carmichael Arena; Chapel Hill, North Carolina
January 30, 1982*		Chattanooga	W 103–81	13–8 (4–2)	Littlejohn Coliseum; Clemson, South Carolina
February 1, 1982*		Tennessee Tech	W 79–78	14–8 (4–2)	Littlejohn Coliseum; Clemson, South Carolina
February 3, 1982		at No. 6 NC State	L 61–76	14–9 (4–3)	Reynolds Coliseum; Raleigh, North Carolina
February 6, 1982*		at No. 17 South Carolina rivalry	L 91–99 ^{OT}	14–10 (4–3)	Carolina Coliseum; Columbia, South Carolina
February 8, 1982*		at No. 16 Auburn	W 73–65	15–10 (4–3)	Beard–Eaves–Memorial Coliseum; Auburn, Alabama
February 13, 1982		Virginia	W 75–65	16–10 (5–3)	Littlejohn Coliseum; Clemson, South Carolina
February 17, 1982*		Erskine	W 101–68	17–10 (5–3)	Littlejohn Coliseum; Clemson, South Carolina
February 20, 1982		North Carolina	W 98–78	18–10 (6–3)	Littlejohn Coliseum; Clemson, South Carolina
ACC Tournament
February 26, 1982*		vs. Georgia Tech; ACC Tournament quarterfinal	W 62–54	19–10 (6–3)	Reynolds Coliseum; Raleigh, North Carolina
February 27, 1982*		vs. North Carolina; ACC Tournament semifinal	W 84–76	20–10 (6–3)	Reynolds Coliseum; Raleigh, North Carolina
February 28, 1982*		vs. No. 8 Maryland; ACC Tournament final	L 81–93	20–11 (6–3)	Reynolds Coliseum; Raleigh, North Carolina
NCAA Tournament
March 12, 1982*		at No. 11 Penn State; NCAA Tournament first round	L 75–96	20–12 (6–3)	Rec Hall; University Park, Pennsylvania
*Non-conference game. ^{#}Rankings from AP Poll. (#) Tournament seedings in parentheses.
