= 1981–82 NCAA Division I women's basketball rankings =

- Season: 1981–82
- NCAA Tournament: 1982
- Preseason No. 1: Louisiana Tech
- NCAA Tournament Champions: Louisiana Tech
NCAA Division I women's basketball rankings
1982–83 →

A single human poll represents the 1981–82 NCAA Division I women's basketball rankings, the AP Poll, in addition to various publications' preseason polls. The AP poll is currently a poll of sportswriters. The AP conducts polls weekly through the end of the regular season and conference play.

While there was only one major poll this season, championships were conducted under the auspices of both the AIAW and the NCAA. The AIAW champion was Rutgers, while the NCAA champion was Louisiana Tech.

== Legend ==
–	Not ranked
(#)	Ranking

== AP Poll ==
Team	18-Nov	29-Nov	6-Dec	13-Dec	20-Dec	27-Dec	3-Jan	10-Jan	17-Jan	24-Jan	31-Jan	7-Feb	14-Feb	21-Feb	28-Feb	7-Mar	14-Mar	27-Mar
Louisiana Tech	1	1	1	1	1	1	1	1	1	1	1	1	1	1	1	1	1	1
Cheyney State	7	6	6	7	8	8	8	7	4	4	4	4	3	2	2	2	2	2
Maryland	11	11	8	9	13	14	12	9	6	6	5	5	9	11	8	8	7	3
Tennessee	2	7	10	14	18	19	20	–	–	–	–	20	13	8	11	10	8	4
Texas	17	18	T20	–	–	–	–	12	12	10	8	7	6	5	5	5	6	5
Southern California	5	4	4	4	4	4	4	2	2	2	2	2	2	3	4	6	5	6
Old Dominion	3	2	2	2	3	3	3	6	7	7	3	3	4	4	3	3	3	7
Rutgers	10	10	7	6	6	6	6	5	3	3	7	6	5	7	7	7	10	8
Long Beach St.	6	5	5	5	5	5	5	3	10	11	9	9	8	6	6	4	4	9
Penn St.	20	20	T20	–	19	18	16	16	14	15	12	14	11	12	12	11	9	10
Villanova	–	–	–	–	T20	–	19	18	15	13	13	13	12	14	16	16	13	11
North Carolina St.	9	9	9	8	7	7	7	8	5	5	6	8	7	9	10	12	11	12
Kentucky	13	12	13	16	16	16	14	10	8	8	11	11	14	17	13	14	14	13
Kansas St.	–	–	–	–	–	20	–	–	–	–	–	–	–	–	19	20	18	14
South Carolina	4	3	3	3	2	2	2	4	9	12	17	19	15	13	14	13	12	15
Drake	19	–	–	–	–	–	–	–	–	–	–	–	–	–	–	19	19	16
Memphis	–	–	–	–	–	–	–	19	17	14	10	10	16	16	15	15	15	17
Arizona St.	–	–	–	20	17	17	17	13	19	18	16	17	17	15	17	17	17	18
Oregon	14	13	16	13	11	10	9	11	11	9	14	12	10	10	9	9	16	19
Missouri	–	–	–	–	–	–	–	–	–	–	–	–	–	–	–	–	20	20
Auburn	–	–	–	–	–	–	–	–	T20	17	18	16	20	19	–	–	–	–
Clemson	16	17	17	–	–	–	–	–	–	–	–	–	–	–	–	–	–	–
Colorado	–	–	–	18	15	15	13	15	16	–	–	–	–	–	–	–	–	–
Detroit	–	–	19	19	–	–	–	–	–	–	–	–	–	–	–	–	–	–
Georgia	12	16	14	11	10	9	11	14	13	16	15	15	19	18	18	18	–	–
Illinois	–	19	18	15	14	12	15	–	–	–	20	–	–	–	–	–	–	–
Kansas	15	14	11	10	9	13	18	20	–	–	–	–	–	–	–	–	–	–
Ohio St.	–	–	–	–	T20	–	–	–	T20	19	–	–	–	–	20	–	–	–
Ole Miss	–	–	–	–	–	–	–	–	–	–	19	18	18	20	–	–	–	–
Stephen F. Austin	18	15	15	12	12	11	10	17	18	20	–	–	–	–	–	–	–	–
UCLA	8	8	12	17	–	–	–	–	–	–	–	–	–	–	–	–	–	–
