= 1981–82 Drake Bulldogs women's basketball team =

Intercollegiate basketball season

1981–82 Drake Bulldogs women's basketball

NCAA tournament, Elite Eight
- Conference: Missouri Valley Conference

Ranking
- AP: No. 16
- Record: 28–7 (7–0 Missouri Valley Conference)
- Head coach: Carole Baumgarten (8th season)
- Home arena: Veterans Memorial Auditorium

The 1981–82 Drake Bulldogs women's basketball team represented Drake University during the 1981–82 NCAA Division I women's basketball season. The Bulldogs were led by eighth year head coach Carole Baumgarten. They played their home games at Veterans Memorial Auditorium and were members of the Missouri Valley Conference. They finished the season 28–7, 7–0 in MVC play.

== Roster ==
1981–82 Drake Bulldogs women's basketball team
| Players | Coaches |
|---|---|
| Pos. / # / Name / Height / Year / Previous school / Hometown; F / 55 / Lorri Bauman / 6 ft 3 in (1.91 m) / So / East HS / Des Moines, IA | Head coach Carole Baumgarten Assistant coach(es) Legend: (C) Team captain; (S) Suspended; (I) Ineligible; (W) Walk-on; Injured; Current redshirt |

== Schedule ==
| Date time, TV | Rank^{#} | Opponent^{#} | Result | Record | Site (attendance) city, state |
Regular season
| 11/27/1981* | | Wisconsin; Drake Harvest Classic | W 93–57 | 1–0 | (700); Des Moines, IA |
| 11/28/1981* | | Memphis State; Drake Harvest Classic | W 85–70 | 2–0 | (800); Des Moines, IA |
| 11/29/1981* | | Illinois; Drake Harvest Classic | L 73–88 | 2–1 | (600); Des Moines, IA |
| 12/01/1981* | | at Minnesota | W 78–58 | 3–1 | (500); Minneapolis, MN |
| 12/05/1981* | | at Kansas | L 69–71 | 3–2 | (300); Lawrence, KS |
| 12/07/1981 | | Illinois State | W 74–53 | 4–2 (1–0) | (575); Des Moines, IA |
| 12/11/1981* | | Mount Mercy | W 86–43 | 5–2 | (500); Des Moines, IA |
| 12/28/1981* | | at Hawaii | W 75–69 | 6–2 | (120); Honolulu, HI |
| 12/29/1981* | | at Hawaii | W 78–63 | 7–2 | (150); Honolulu, HI |
| 01/02/1982* | | at Oregon | L 56–64 | 7–3 | (894); Eugene, OR |
| 01/03/1982* | | at Oregon State | L 49–59 | 7–4 | (300); Corvallis, OR |
| 01/05/1982* | | vs. Washington; Lady Griz Insurance Classic | W 66–50 | 8–4 | Dahlberg Arena (1,146); Missoula, MT |
| 01/06/1982* | | at Montana; Lady Griz Insurance Classic | W 71–65 | 9–4 | Dahlberg Arena (1,509); Missoula, MT |
| 01/13/1982 | | Wichita State | W 89–78 | 10–4 (2–0) | (678); Des Moines, IA |
| 01/19/1982 | | Creighton | W 101–55 | 11–4 (3–0) | (690); Des Moines, IA |
| 01/22/1982* | | vs. Georgia; Old Dominion University Optimist Classic | W 76–64 | 12–4 | Old Dominion University Fieldhouse (2,156); Norfolk, VA |
| 01/23/1982* | | at Old Dominion; Old Dominion University Optimist Classic | L 61–92 | 12–5 | Old Dominion University Fieldhouse (2,335); Norfolk, VA |
| 01/25/1982* | | Iowa State | W 101–56 | 13–5 | (1,166); Des Moines, IA |
| 01/27/1982 | | at Wichita State | W 81–62 | 14–5 (4–0) | (368); Wichita, KS |
| 01/29/1982 | | at Southern Illinois | W 75–67 | 15–5 (5–0) | (258); Carbondale, IL |
| 02/02/1982* | | Minnesota | W 87–60 | 16–5 | (660); Des Moines, IA |
| 02/04/1982 | | at Creighton | W 68–52 | 17–5 (6–0) | (50); Omaha, NE |
| 02/06/1982* | | at Iowa | W 77–63 | 18–5 | (300); Iowa City, IA |
| 02/13/1982* | | at Nebraska | W 102–74 | 19–5 | (250); Lincoln, NE |
| 02/16/1982* | | at Kansas State | L 74–82 | 19–6 | (550); Manhattan, KS |
| 02/20/1982* | | Iowa | W 96–61 | 20–6 | (1,175); Des Moines, IA |
| 02/21/1982* | | Nebraska | W 89–85 | 21–6 | (804); Des Moines, IA |
| 02/24/1982* | | at Iowa State | W 74–56 | 22–6 | (750); Ames, IA |
| 02/26/1982 | | Southern Illinois | W 84–72 | 23–6 (7–0) | (690); Des Moines, IA |
| 02/27/1982* | | Western Illinois | W 96–52 | 24–6 | (770); Des Moines, IA |
| 03/03/1982* | | vs. Wichita State; Missouri Valley Conference Tournament | W 73–72 | 25–6 | SIU Arena (276); Carbondale, IL |
| 03/05/1982* | | vs. Illinois State; Missouri Valley Conference Tournament | W 70–64 | 26–6 | SIU Arena (116); Carbondale, IL |
NCAA Tournament
| 03/14/1982* | (4 W) No. 19 | (5 W) Ohio State; First Round | W 90–79 | 27–6 | (900); Des Moines, IA |
| 03/19/1982* | (4 W) No. 19 | vs. (1 W) No. 4 Long Beach State; Sweet Sixteen | W 91–78 | 28–6 | Maples Pavilion (706); Palo Alto, CA |
| 03/21/1982* | (4 W) No. 19 | vs. (2 W) No. 3 Maryland; Elite Eight | L 78–89 | 28–7 | Maples Pavilion (250); Palo Alto, CA |
*Non-conference game. ^{#}Rankings from AP Poll. (#) Tournament seedings in parentheses. W=West. All times are in Central Time Zone.
