= 1981–82 Maryland Terrapins women's basketball team =

Intercollegiate basketball season

1981–82 Maryland Terrapins women's basketball

ACC Regular season & Tournament champions

NCAA Tournament, Final Four
- Conference: Atlantic Coast Conference

Ranking
- AP: No. 3
- Record: 25–7 (6–1 ACC)
- Head coach: Chris Weller (7th season)
- Home arena: Cole Field House

1981–82 ACC women's basketball standings
| | Conf. | | | | Overall |
| Team | W | | L | PCT | W | | L | PCT |
|---|---|---|---|---|---|---|---|---|
| No. 3 Maryland † | 6 | – | 1 | .857 | 25 | – | 7 | .781 |
| No. 12 NC State | 11 | – | 2 | .846 | 24 | – | 7 | .774 |
| North Carolina | 10 | – | 3 | .769 | 17 | – | 12 | .586 |
| Clemson | 6 | – | 3 | .667 | 20 | – | 12 | .625 |
| Virginia | 3 | – | 7 | .300 | 17 | – | 11 | .607 |
| Georgia Tech | 2 | – | 9 | .182 | 9 | – | 16 | .360 |
| Wake Forest | 1 | – | 9 | .100 | 13 | – | 17 | .433 |
† 1982 ACC tournament winner Rankings from AP poll

The 1981–82 Maryland Terrapins women's basketball team represented the University of Maryland, College Park as a member of the Atlantic Coast Conference during 1981–82 NCAA Division I women's basketball season. The team was led by head coach Chris Weller and played their home games at Cole Field House. The Lady Terrapins won the ACC regular season championship and the 1982 ACC women's basketball tournament. Maryland received an automatic bid to the inaugural NCAA women's basketball tournament where they advanced to the Final Four, losing to No. 2 Cheney State.

== Roster ==
1981–82 Maryland Terrapins women's basketball team
| Players | Coaches |
|---|---|
| Pos. / # / Name / Height / Year / Previous school / Hometown | Head coach Chris Weller Assistant coach(es) Legend: (C) Team captain; (S) Suspended; (I) Ineligible; (W) Walk-on; Injured; Current redshirt |

== Schedule ==
| Date time, TV | Rank^{#} | Opponent^{#} | Result | Record | Site (attendance) city, state |
Regular season
| Feb 10, 1982*; 7:30 p.m. | No. 5 | No. 4 Cheyney State | L 51–67 | 18–4 | Cole Field House; College Park, Maryland |
| Feb 20, 1982* | No. 9 | at No. 13 Tennessee | L 62–70 | 19–6 | Stokely Athletic Center; Knoxville, Tennessee |
ACC tournament
NCAA tournament
| Mar 21, 1982* | (2 W) No. 3 | vs. (4 W) No. 19 Drake; Regional Final – Elite Eight | W 89–78 | 25–6 | Maples Pavilion; Palo Alto, California |
| Mar 26, 1982* | (2 W) No. 3 | vs. (2 E) No. 2 Cheyney State; National Semifinal – Final Four | L 66–76 | 25–7 | Norfolk Scope; Norfolk, Virginia |
*Non-conference game. ^{#}Rankings from AP Poll, ( ) Tournament seedings in parentheses. (#) Tournament seedings in parentheses. All times are in Eastern Time.

== See also ==
1981–82 Maryland Terrapins men's basketball team
