= 1982–83 Old Dominion Lady Monarchs basketball team =

1982–83 Old Dominion Lady Monarchs basketball season

1982–83 Old Dominion Lady Monarchs basketball

Sun Belt tournament champions Northern Lights Invite champions

NCAA tournament, Final Four
- Conference: Sun Belt Conference

Ranking
- AP: No. 4
- Record: 29–6 (2–0 Sun Belt)
- Head coach: Marianne Stanley (6th season)
- Home arena: ODU Fieldhouse; Norfolk Scope (alternate)

1982–83 Sun Belt Conference women's basketball standings
| | Conf. | | | | Overall |
| Team | W | | L | PCT | W | | L | PCT |
|---|---|---|---|---|---|---|---|---|
| No. 4 Old Dominion † | | – | | – | 31 | – | 3 | .912 |
| Western Kentucky | | – | | – | 22 | – | 7 | .759 |
| South Alabama | | – | | – | 20 | – | 9 | .690 |
| UNC Charlotte | | – | | – | 14 | – | 13 | .519 |
† 1983 Sun Belt tournament winner Rankings from AP Poll

The 1982–83 Old Dominion Lady Monarchs basketball team represented Old Dominion University during the 1982–83 NCAA Division I women's basketball season. The Monarchs, led by sixth-year head coach Marianne Stanley, played their home games at the Old Dominion University Fieldhouse, and alternatively at the Norfolk Scope, in Norfolk, Virginia. They were members of the Sun Belt Conference.

== Roster ==
1982–83 Old Dominion Lady Monarchs women's basketball team
Players
Coaches

| Pos. | # | Name | Height | Year | Hometown |
|---|---|---|---|---|---|---|
| F | 3 | Dawn Cullen | 6 ft 4 in (1.93 m) | Fr | Norfolk Catholic | Norfolk, VA |
| F | 13 | Medina Dixon | — | So | Boston, MA |
| C | 15 | Tracy Claxton | — | So | New Haven, CT |
| G | 20 | Lisa Blais | — | So |
| C | 22 | Anne Donovan | 6 ft 8 in (2.03 m) | Sr | Paramus, NJ |
| F | 32 | Alphelia Goodson | — |
| | | | — | — |

Head coach

- Marianne Stanley (Immaculata)

Assistant coach(es)

- Wendy Larry - asst. coach
- Barbara Thaxton - asst. coach
- Beth Calder - manager
- Lisa Hendrick - manager
- Trish Vantucci - manager

Legend

- (C) Team captain
- (S) Suspended
- (I) Ineligible
- (W) Walk-on
- Injured
- Current redshirt

Roster

== Schedule and results ==
| Date time, TV | Rank^{#} | Opponent^{#} | Result | Record | Site (attendance) city, state |
Regular season
| Nov 22, 1982* | No. 3 | George Mason | W 104–39 | 1–0 | ODU Fieldhouse; Norfolk, Virginia |
| Nov 30, 1982* | No. 3 | at No. 4 Tennessee | W 78–72 ^{OT} | 2–0 | Stokely Athletic Center; Knoxville, Tennessee |
| Dec 2, 1982* | No. 3 | at Drake | W 81–72 | 3–0 | Veterans Memorial Auditorium; Des Moines, Iowa |
| Dec 4, 1982* | No. 3 | at Kansas State | L 50–58 | 3–1 | Ahearn Field House; Manhattan, Kansas |
| Dec 10, 1982* | No. 4 | West Virginia | W 74–47 | 4–1 | ODU Fieldhouse; Norfolk, Virginia |
| Dec 18, 1982* | No. 4 | Norfolk State | W 95–58 | 5–1 | ODU Fieldhouse; Norfolk, Virginia |
| Dec 20, 1982* | No. 4 | Virginia Tech | W 84–53 | 6–1 | ODU Fieldhouse; Norfolk, Virginia |
| Dec 28, 1982* | No. 4 | vs. No. 20 NC State; Winston Tire Classic | W 87–64 | 7–1 | L.A. Sports Arena; Los Angeles, California |
| Dec 29, 1982* | No. 4 | at No. 1 USC; Winston Tire Classic | L 47–75 | 7–2 | L.A. Sports Arena; Los Angeles, California |
| Jan 6, 1983* | No. 4 | at No. 2 Louisiana Tech | L 48–69 | 7–3 | Thomas Assembly Center; Ruston, Louisiana |
| Jan 8, 1983* | No. 4 | at Stephen F. Austin | W 61–58 | 8–3 | William R. Johnson Coliseum; Nacogdoches, Texas |
| Jan 12, 1983* | No. 6 | No. 10 Long Beach State | W 81–58 | 9–3 | ODU Fieldhouse; Norfolk, Virginia |
| Jan 14, 1983* | No. 6 | East Carolina | W 92–52 | 10–3 | ODU Fieldhouse; Norfolk, Virginia |
| Jan 16, 1983* | No. 6 | San Diego State | W 79–76 | 11–3 | ODU Fieldhouse; Norfolk, Virginia |
| Jan 19, 1983* | No. 6 | Virginia | W 99–48 | 12–3 | ODU Fieldhouse; Norfolk, Virginia |
| Jan 25, 1983* | No. 6 | at Syracuse | W 96–60 | 13–3 | Manley Field House; Syracuse, New York |
| Jan 28, 1983* | No. 6 | Memphis State; Optimist Classic | W 72–50 | 14–3 | Norfolk Scope; Norfolk, Virginia |
| Jan 29, 1983* | No. 6 | Illinois State; Optimist Classic | W 72–66 | 15–3 | Norfolk Scope; Norfolk, Virginia |
| Feb 2, 1983* | No. 6 | at East Carolina | W 76–37 | 16–3 | Williams Arena at Minges Coliseum; Greenville, North Carolina |
| Feb 5, 1983* | No. 6 | at No. 7 Kentucky | L 66–80 | 16–4 | Rupp Arena; Lexington, Kentucky |
| Feb 9, 1983* | No. 7 | at No. 8 Maryland | L 66–82 | 16–5 | Cole Field House; College Park, Maryland |
| Feb 12, 1983* | No. 7 | Rutgers | W 99–71 | 17–5 | ODU Fieldhouse; Norfolk, Virginia |
| Feb 14, 1983* | No. 9 | No. 4 Tennessee; Donna Doyle Scholarship Game | W 90–66 | 18–5 | Norfolk Scope; Norfolk, Virginia |
| Feb 18, 1983* | No. 9 | Boston University | W 94–70 | 19–5 | ODU Fieldhouse; Norfolk, Virginia |
| Feb 25, 1983* | No. 4 | vs. Penn; Northern Lights Invite | W 79–41 | 20–5 | Sullivan Arena; Anchorage, Alaska |
| Feb 26, 1983* | No. 4 | vs. Stanford; Northern Lights Invite | W 83–49 | 21–5 | Sullivan Arena; Anchorage, Alaska |
| Feb 27, 1983* | No. 4 | vs. Wichita State; Northern Lights Invite | W 76–53 | 22–5 | Sullivan Arena; Anchorage, Alaska |
| Mar 3, 1983* | No. 4 | James Madison | W 92–58 | 23–5 | ODU Fieldhouse; Norfolk, Virginia |
| Mar 6, 1983* | No. 4 | at South Carolina | W 72–60 | 24–5 | Carolina Coliseum; Columbia, South Carolina |
Sun Belt tournament
| Mar 10, 1983* | (1) No. 4 | UAB; Semifinals | W 102–79 | 25–5 | Norfolk Scope; Norfolk, Virginia |
| Mar 11, 1983* | (1) No. 4 | Western Kentucky; Championship game | W 78–67 | 26–5 | Norfolk Scope; Norfolk, Virginia |
NCAA tournament
| Mar 24, 1983* | (1 E) No. 4 | vs. (3 E) No. 6 Maryland; Regional Semifinal – Sweet Sixteen | W 74–57 | 28–5 | Rec Hall; University Park, Pennsylvania |
| Mar 26, 1983* | (1 E) No. 4 | at (5 E) No. 10 Penn State; Regional Final – Elite Eight | W 74–60 | 29–5 | Rec Hall; University Park, Pennsylvania |
| Apr 1, 1983* | (1 E) No. 4 | (1 MW) No. 1 Louisiana Tech; National Semifinal – Final Four | L 55–71 | 29–6 | Norfolk Scope; Norfolk, Virginia |
*Non-conference game. ^{#}Rankings from AP Poll. (#) Tournament seedings in parentheses. All times are in Eastern. E = East, MW = Midwest

- Source: Old Dominion Athletics, NCAA Statistics

== Rankings ==
Ranking movements Legend: ██ Increase in ranking ██ Decrease in ranking
| | Week | | | | | | | | | | | | | | | | |
| Poll | 1 | 2 | 3 | 4 | 5 | 6 | 7 | 8 | 9 | 10 | 11 | 12 | 13 | 14 | 15 | 16 | Final |
|---|---|---|---|---|---|---|---|---|---|---|---|---|---|---|---|---|---|
| AP | 3 | 3 | 4 | 4 | 4 | 4 | 4 | 6 | 6 | 6 | 6 | 7 | 9 | 4 | 4 | 4 | 4 |

- Source: Division I Women's Basketball Records

== Awards and honors ==
- Anne Donovan – Naismith College Player of the Year, Honda Sports Award, WBCA Player of the Year
