= 1981–82 Tennessee Lady Volunteers basketball team =

Intercollegiate basketball season

1981–82 Tennessee Lady Volunteers basketball

NCAA tournament, Final Four
- Conference: Southeastern Conference

Ranking
- AP: No. 4
- Record: 22–10 (6–1 SEC)
- Head coach: Pat Summitt (8th season)
- Assistant coach: Nancy Darsch
- Home arena: Stokely Athletic Center

1981–82 SEC women's basketball standings
	Conf.				Overall
Team	W		L	PCT	W		L	PCT
Ole Miss	7	–	1	.875	27	–	5	.844
No. 4 Tennessee	7	–	1	.875	22	–	10	.688
Georgia	7	–	4	.636	21	–	9	.700
LSU	4	–	7	.364	18	–	13	.581
Alabama	2	–	6	.250	16	–	13	.552
Vanderbilt	2	–	8	.200	20	–	14	.588
Mississippi State	0	–	9	.000	11	–	15	.423
Auburn		–		–	24	–	5	.828
No. 13 Kentucky †		–		–	24	–	8	.750
Florida		–		–	13	–	16	.448
† 1982 SEC tournament winner Rankings from AP poll

The 1981–82 Tennessee Lady Volunteers basketball team represented the University of Tennessee as a member of the Southeastern Conference during the 1981–82 women's college basketball season. Coached by Pat Summitt, the Lady Volunteers finished 22–10 and ranked No. 4 in the final poll, and reached the first NCAA Final Four in their rich program history.

== Roster ==
1981–82 Tennessee Lady Volunteers women's basketball team
Players
Coaches

Pos.	#	Name	Height	Year	Previous school	Hometown
F	14	Mary Ostrowski	6 ft 2 in (1.88 m)	So	Parkersburg, West Virginia
G	40	Lynne Collins	6 ft 0 in (1.83 m)	So	Blacksburg, Virginia
F	45	Tanya Haave	6 ft 2 in (1.88 m)	So	Evergreen, Colorado
C	55	Paula Towns	6 ft 1 in (1.85 m)	So	Peach County	Fort Valley, Georgia

Head coach

- Pat Summitt

Assistant coach(es)

- Nancy Darsch

Legend

- (C) Team captain
- (S) Suspended
- (I) Ineligible
- (W) Walk-on
- Injured
- Current redshirt

Roster

== Schedule and results ==
Date time, TV	Rank^{#}	Opponent^{#}	Result	Record	Site city, state
Regular season
Nov 22, 1981*	No. 2	No. 18 Stephen F. Austin	L 74–80	0–1	Stokely Athletic Center; Knoxville, Tennessee
Nov 28, 1981	No. 7	at Florida	W 85–73	1–1 (1–0)	O'Connell Center; Gainesville, Florida
Dec 2, 1981*	No. 7	at No. 2 Old Dominion	L 54–66	1–2	Norfolk Scope; Norfolk, Virginia
Dec 6, 1981	No. 10	Vanderbilt	W 99–77	2–2 (2–0)	Stokely Athletic Center; Knoxville, Tennessee
Dec 8, 1981*	No. 10	at Colorado	L 60–78	2–3	CU Events/Conference Center; Boulder, Colorado
Dec 9, 1981*	No. 10	at No. 4 USC	L 70–86	2–4	L.A. Sports Arena; Los Angeles, California
Dec 13, 1981*	No. 14	at No. 17 UCLA	W 71–66	3–4	Pauley Pavilion; Los Angeles, California
Dec 16, 1981*	No. 14	vs. Washington State; Giusti Tournament of Champions	W 55–46	4–4	Portland, Oregon
Dec 17, 1981*	No. 14	vs. Ohio State; Giusti Tournament of Champions	L 82–83 ^{2OT}	4–5	Portland, Oregon
Dec 18, 1981*	No. 14	vs. Oregon State; Giusti Tournament of Champions	W 73–62	5–5	Portland, Oregon
Jan 4, 1982	No. 20	at Vanderbilt	W 80–63	6–5 (3–0)	Memorial Gymnasium; Nashville, Tennessee
Jan 7, 1982*	No. 20	Kansas State	W 83–68	7–5	Stokely Athletic Center; Knoxville, Tennessee
Jan 10, 1982*		No. 1 Louisiana Tech	L 64–72	7–6	Stokely Athletic Center; Knoxville, Tennessee
Jan 17, 1982		at No. 13 Georgia	L 63–66	7–7 (3–1)	Stegeman Coliseum; Athens, Georgia
Jan 21, 1982*		Clemson	W 91–60	8–7	Stokely Athletic Center; Knoxville, Tennessee
Jan 23, 1982*		at No. 3 Rutgers	L 57–68	8–8	Rutgers Athletic Center; Piscataway, New Jersey
Jan 25, 1982*		at No. 12 South Carolina	W 87–81	9–8	Columbia, South Carolina
Jan 28, 1982		No. 8 Kentucky	W 81–75	10–8 (4–1)	Stokely Athletic Center; Knoxville, Tennessee
Jan 30, 1982*		at North Carolina	W 76–62	11–8	Carmichael Auditorium; Chapel Hill, North Carolina
Feb 1, 1982		Florida	W 83–67	12–8 (5–1)	Stokely Athletic Center; Knoxville, Tennessee
Feb 7, 1982*	No. 20	No. 14 Penn State	W 98–74	13–8	Stokely Athletic Center; Knoxville, Tennessee
Feb 11, 1982	No. 20	No. 15 Georgia	W 83–67	14–8 (6–1)	Stokely Athletic Center; Knoxville, Tennessee
Feb 14, 1982*	No. 13	No. 4 Old Dominion	W 62–58	15–8	Stokely Athletic Center; Knoxville, Tennessee
Feb 18, 1982	No. 13	No. 14 Kentucky	W 65–61	16–8 (7–1)	Rupp Arena; Lexington, Kentucky
Feb 20, 1982*	No. 13	No. 9 Maryland	W 70–62	17–8	Stokely Athletic Center; Knoxville, Tennessee
SEC tournament
Feb 26, 1982*	No. 8	vs. Vanderbilt; Quarterfinals	W 80–75	18–8	Rupp Arena; Lexington, Kentucky
Feb 27, 1982*	No. 8	vs. No. 18 Georgia; Semifinals	W 55–44	19–8	Rupp Arena; Lexington, Kentucky
Feb 28, 1982*	No. 11	at No. 13 Kentucky; Championship game	L 74–80	19–9	Rupp Arena; Lexington, Kentucky
NCAA tournament
Mar 13, 1982*	(2 ME) No. 8	(7 ME) Jackson State; First round	W 72–56	20–9	Stokely Athletic Center; Knoxville, Tennessee
Mar 18, 1982*	(2 ME) No. 8	(3 ME) No. 15 Memphis State; Regional Semifinal – Sweet Sixteen	W 78–63	21–9	Stokely Athletic Center; Knoxville, Tennessee
Mar 20, 1982*	(2 ME) No. 8	(1 ME) No. 5 USC; Regional Final – Elite Eight	W 91–90 ^{OT}	22–9	Stokely Athletic Center; Knoxville, Tennessee
Mar 26, 1982*	(2 ME) No. 8	vs. (1 MW) No. 1 Louisiana Tech; National Semifinal – Final Four	L 46–69	22–10	Norfolk Scope; Norfolk, Virginia
*Non-conference game. ^{#}Rankings from AP Poll. (#) Tournament seedings in parentheses. ME=Mideast.
