= 1981–82 Cheyney State Lady Wolves basketball team =

1981-82 Cheyney State Wolves women's basketball season

1981–82 Cheyney State Lady Wolves basketball

NCAA tournament, Runner-up
- Conference: Independent

Ranking
- AP: No. 2
- Record: 28–3
- Head coach: C. Vivian Stringer (11th season)
- Assistant coaches: Carlotta Schaffer (3rd season); Ann Hill
- Home arena: Cope Hall

The 1981–82 Cheyney State Lady Wolves basketball team represented Cheyney State College as an NCAA independent during the 1981–82 NCAA Division I women's basketball season. The team was led by 11th–year head coach C. Vivian Stringer and played their home games at Cope Hall in Cheyney, Pennsylvania. Fueled by a roster with eight high school All-Americans and an eventual Hall of Fame coach, the Lady Wolves earned a record of 28–3 and a No. 2 ranking, and finished runner-up for the inaugural NCAA Division I women's basketball championship – despite being a Division II school with limited resources.

To date, this Cheyney State team is the only HBCU to reach the NCAA women's Final Four and play for an NCAA championship. Years later, Stringer became the first coach to lead three different teams to the NCAA Final Four, following her success at Cheyney with strong runs at Iowa and Rutgers, and ended her 50-year career with over 1,000 victories.

== Roster ==
1981–82 Cheyney Wolves women's basketball team
Players
Coaches

Pos.	#	Name	Height	Year	Hometown
G	3	Sandra Giddins	5 ft 6 in (1.68 m)	So	Yonkers, New York
G	10	Karen Draughn	5 ft 8 in (1.73 m)	So	New Haven, Connecticut
G	11	Lena Dabney	5 ft 8 in (1.73 m)	Jr	Philadelphia, Pennsylvania
F/C	15	Ann Strong	6 ft 1 in (1.85 m)	Fr	Toledo, Ohio
F	30	Debra Walker	5 ft 10 in (1.78 m)	Jr	Detroit, Michigan
C	34	Shay Taylor	6 ft 4 in (1.93 m)	So	Jersey City, New Jersey
C	40	Faith Wilds (C)	6 ft 3 in (1.91 m)	Sr	Pittsburgh, Pennsylvania
G	41	Paulette Bigelow	5 ft 7 in (1.7 m)	Fr	East Orange, New Jersey
G/F	44	Yolanda Laney	5 ft 10 in (1.78 m)	So	Philadelphia, Pennsylvania
F	51	Rosetta Guilford	5 ft 9 in (1.75 m)	So	Newark, New Jersey
F	53	Valerie Walker (C)	6 ft 1 in (1.85 m)	Sr	Piscataway, New Jersey

Head coach

- C. Vivian Stringer

Assistant coach(es)

- Ann Hill
- Carlotta "Bunny" Schaffer

Legend

- (C) Team captain
- (S) Suspended
- (I) Ineligible
- (W) Walk-on
- Injured
- Current redshirt

== Schedule and results ==
Date time, TV	Rank^{#}	Opponent^{#}	Result	Record	Site (attendance) city, state
Regular season
Nov 21, 1981*; 7:00 p.m.	No. 7	Morgan State	W 79-31	1–0	Cope Hall; Cheyney, Pennsylvania
Nov 24, 1981*; 6:00 p.m.	No. 7	at Boston University	W 85–58	2–0	Case Gym; Boston, Massachusetts
Dec 1, 1981*; 7:00 p.m.	No. 6	at Kutztown State	W 103–38	3–0	Keystone Hall; Kutztown, Pennsylvania
Dec 9, 1981*; 8:00 p.m.	No. 6	at Mount St. Mary's	W 66–65	4–0	Emmitsburg, Maryland
Dec 15, 1981*; 7:00 p.m.	No. 7	Millersville State	W 104–21	5–0	Cope Hall; Cheyney, Pennsylvania
Dec 19, 1981*	No. 7	vs. No. 3 Old Dominion; Manufacturers Hanover Christmas Classic	L 55–83	5–1	Madison Square Garden; New York, New York
Dec 20, 1981*	No. 8	vs. No. 6 Rutgers; Manufacturers Hanover Christmas Classic	L 82–86	5–2	Madison Square Garden; New York, New York
Jan 5, 1982*	No. 8	Delta State	W 90–36	6–2	Cope Hall; Cheyney, Pennsylvania
Jan 6, 1982*	No. 8	William Penn	W 92–51	7–2	Cope Hall; Cheyney, Pennsylvania
Jan 9, 1982*	No. 4	at Montclair State	W 67–64	8–2	Montclair, New Jersey
Jan 19, 1982*; 6:30 p.m.	No. 4	at Shippensburg State	W 97–48	9–2	Heiges Field House; Shippensburg, Pennsylvania
Jan 21, 1982*; 7:00 p.m.	No. 4	Saint Joseph's	W 90–49	10–2	Cope Hall; Cheyney, Pennsylvania
Jan 23, 1982*; 6:00 p.m.	No. 4	No. 15 Villanova	W 68–58	11–2	Cope Hall; Cheyney, Pennsylvania
Jan 25, 1982*; 7:00 p.m.	No. 4	East Stroudsburg State	W 105–35	12–2	Cope Hall; Cheyney, Pennsylvania
Jan 27, 1982*; 7:00 p.m.	No. 4	Seton Hall	W 86–57	13–2	Cope Hall; Cheyney, Pennsylvania
Jan 30, 1982*; 7:00 p.m.	No. 4	Pittsburgh	W 85–59	14–2	Cope Hall; Cheyney, Pennsylvania
Feb 3, 1982*; 7:00 p.m.	No. 4	No. 12 Penn State	W 78–70	15–2	Cope Hall; Cheyney, Pennsylvania
Feb 5, 1982*; 7:00 p.m.	No. 4	Howard	W 102–50	16–2	Cope Hall; Cheyney, Pennsylvania
Feb 8, 1982*; 7:00 p.m.	No. 4	Temple	W 91–54	17–2	Cope Hall; Cheyney, Pennsylvania
Feb 10, 1982*; 7:30 p.m.	No. 4	at No. 5 Maryland	W 67–51	18–2	Cole Field House; College Park, Maryland
Feb 13, 1982*; 6:30 p.m.	No. 4	Queens College	W 105–57	19–2	Cope Hall; Cheyney, Pennsylvania
Feb 17, 1982*; 7:30 p.m.	No. 3	at No. 5 Rutgers	W 67–53	20–2	Rutgers Athletic Center; Piscataway, New Jersey
Feb 19, 1982*; 6:00 p.m.	No. 3	Edinboro			Cope Hall; Cheyney, Pennsylvania
Feb 23, 1982*; 7:00 p.m.	No. 2	La Salle	W 75–49	22–2	Cope Hall; Cheyney, Pennsylvania
PSAC tournament
Feb 26, 1982*	No. 2	Millersville State; Semifinals	W 114–37	23–2	Cope Hall; Cheyney, Pennsylvania
Feb 27, 1982*	No. 2	Slippery Rock; Championship game	W 92–33	24–2	Cope Hall; Cheyney, Pennsylvania
NCAA tournament
Mar 13, 1982*	(2 E) No. 2	vs. (7 E) Auburn; First round	W 75–64	25–2	Cope Hall; Cheyney, Pennsylvania
Mar 18, 1982*	(2 E) No. 2	vs. (3 E) No. 11 NC State; Regional Semifinal – Sweet Sixteen	W 74–61	26–2	Reynolds Coliseum; Raleigh, North Carolina
Mar 20, 1982*	(2 E) No. 2	vs. (4 E) No. 18 Kansas State; Regional Final – Elite Eight	W 93–71	27–2	Reynolds Coliseum; Raleigh, North Carolina
Mar 26, 1982*	(2 E) No. 2	vs. (2 W) No. 3 Maryland; National Semifinal – Final Four	W 76–66	28–2	Norfolk Scope; Norfolk, Virginia
Mar 28, 1982*; CBS	(2 E) No. 2	vs. (1 MW) No. 1 Louisiana Tech; National Championship	L 62–76	28–3	Norfolk Scope (9,531); Norfolk, Virginia
*Non-conference game. ^{#}Rankings from AP Poll. (#) Tournament seedings in parentheses. E=East. All times are in Eastern.

== Rankings ==
Ranking movements Legend: ██ Increase in ranking ██ Decrease in ranking ( ) = First-place votes
	Week																	
Poll	1	2	3	4	5	6	7	8	9	10	11	12	13	14	15	16	17	Final
AP	7 (1)	6	6	7	8	8	8	7	4	4	4	4	3	2	2	2	2	2

== Awards and honors ==
- Valerie Walker – All-American

== See also ==
- 1983–84 Cheyney State Lady Wolves basketball team
