= Say No Classic =

Say No Classic is a Southern California basketball league that was founded in 1972. It is recognized as one of the top NCAA sanctioned summer basketball leagues in the United States.

== Official sponsors ==
The official sponsors of the Say No Classic summer league are:

- Nike
- Carl's Jr.
