= 1982–83 NCAA Division I women's basketball rankings =

- Season: 1982–83
- NCAA Tournament: 1983
- Preseason No. 1: USC
- NCAA Tournament Champions: USC
NCAA Division I women's basketball rankings


A single human poll represents the 1982–83 NCAA Division I women's basketball rankings, the AP Poll, in addition to various publications' preseason polls.

The AP poll was initially a poll of coaches conducted via telephone, where coaches identified top teams and a list of the Top 20 team was produced. The contributors continued to be coaches until 1994, when the AP took over administration of the poll from Mel Greenberg, and switched to a panel of writers. The AP poll is currently a poll of sportswriters. The AP conducts polls weekly through the end of the regular season and conference play.

== Legend ==
–	Not ranked
(#)	Ranking

== AP Poll ==
Team	18-Nov	28-Nov	5-Dec	12-Dec	19-Dec	26-Dec	2-Jan	9-Jan	16-Jan	23-Jan	30-Jan	6-Feb	13-Feb	20-Feb	27-Feb	6-Mar	13-Mar
Louisiana Tech	2	2	2	2	2	2	2	2	2	1	1	1	1	1	1	1	1
Southern California	1	1	1	1	1	1	1	1	1	2	2	2	2	2	2	2	2
Texas	5	5	10	6	6	6	6	4	4	4	3	3	3	3	3	3	3
Old Dominion	3	3	4	4	4	4	4	6	6	6	6	7	9	4	4	4	4
Cheyney	9	8	8	10	9	7	9	5	5	5	4	5	5	6	5	5	5
Maryland	6	6	3	3	3	3	3	3	3	3	5	8	6	7	7	6	6
Long Beach St.	10	9	9	7	7	8	7	10	13	12	11	11	10	9	9	7	7
Georgia	7	12	13	11	10	9	10	8	9	9	10	10	12	12	12	8	8
Tennessee	4	4	5	9	11	12	11	11	8	8	8	6	4	5	8	10	9
Penn St.	12	11	11	16	17	15	17	18	17	18	19	14	15	11	10	9	10
Kentucky	8	7	7	5	5	5	5	7	7	7	7	4	7	8	6	11	11
Arizona St.	16	15	18	18	15	19	15	9	12	14	13	12	11	10	11	12	12
Ole Miss	19	20	19	19	18	16	18	14	11	11	12	16	16	15	15	13	13
Auburn	–	–	–	–	20	18	20	15	18	17	20	15	14	14	14	15	14
Missouri	–	18	16	12	12	10	12	12	14	13	14	17	19	17	17	17	15
North Carolina St.	15	14	12	15	19	20	19	–	19	20	15	19	18	16	16	16	16
Kansas St.	11	10	6	8	8	11	8	13	10	10	9	9	8	13	13	14	17
North Carolina	–	–	–	–	–	–	–	20	–	–	–	20	T20	T20	18	18	18
Oregon St.	–	–	–	–	–	–	–	–	T20	19	17	–	–	–	T20	T20	19
LSU	–	–	–	–	–	–	–	–	–	–	–	–	17	–	19	T20	20
California	20	–	–	–	–	–	–	–	–	–	–	–	–	–	–	–	–
Drake	18	19	20	–	–	–	–	–	–	–	–	–	–	–	–	–	–
Florida St.	–	–	–	–	–	–	–	–	T20	–	–	–	–	–	T20	19	–
Minnesota	–	–	–	20	–	–	–	–	–	–	–	–	–	–	–	–	–
Ohio St.	–	–	–	–	–	–	–	–	–	–	–	–	T20	–	–	–	–
Oral Roberts	–	–	–	–	–	–	–	–	–	–	–	–	–	T20	–	–	–
Rutgers	14	17	17	17	16	14	16	16	16	16	18	13	13	18	–	–	–
South Carolina	13	13	15	14	14	13	14	19	–	–	–	–	–	19	–	–	–
Stephen F. Austin	17	–	–	–	–	–	–	–	–	–	–	–	–	–	–	–	–
UCLA	–	16	14	13	13	17	13	17	15	15	16	18	–	–	–	–	–
