= M'Lis Ward =

African-American pilot

- Born: Melissa Ward; 1964 or 1965 (age 61–62)
- Education: University of Southern California (BBA)
- Employer: United Airlines
- Known for: First female African-American commercial passenger airline captain
- Military career
- Allegiance: United States
- Branch: Air Force

Melissa "M'Lis" Ward is a United Airlines pilot, the first African-American female captain in commercial passenger aviation, according to Ebony magazine. Her mother, Anne B. Ward, was one of the first two black women to graduate from the Pritzker School of Medicine.

Ward was brought up in the South Side of Chicago and attended Whitney Young High School. She was awarded an Air Force ROTC scholarship to college. She gained a BS from the Marshall School of Business at the University of Southern California. She joined the US Air Force, where she was an instructor-pilot on the T-37 and a First Pilot on the C141. In November 1992 she joined United Airlines in Chicago, as a second officer on DC-10s. After nine months she became first officer on Boeing 737-200s flying out of San Francisco, moving to 727s flying out of Denver in June 1995. M'lis upgraded to Captain on the Boeing 737-300 in 1998 and then the Airbus 319 & 320 in 2010. She is the first African American female to be an Evaluator and FAA Designee for United Airlines.

She later coached basketball at Dakota Ridge high school in Littleton, Colorado.
