= 1983 NCAA Division I women's basketball tournament =

American college basketball tournament

- Teams: 36
- Finals site: Norfolk Scope, Norfolk, Virginia
- Champions: USC (1st title, 1st title game, 1st Final Four)
- Runner-up: Louisiana Tech (2nd title game, 2nd Final Four)
- Semifinalists: Old Dominion (1st Final Four); Georgia (1st Final Four)
- Winning coach: Linda Sharp (1st title)
- MOP: Cheryl Miller (USC)

The 1983 NCAA Division I women's basketball tournament began on March 18 and concluded on April 3 with USC winning the title. The tournament consisted of 36 teams. The Final Four was held in Norfolk, Virginia and consisted of USC, Louisiana Tech, Old Dominion, and Georgia. USC's Cheryl Miller was named the Most Outstanding Player of the tournament.

== Notable events ==
Neither semifinal game in the final four turned out to be close. Defending national champion Louisiana Tech beat long time powerhouse Old Dominion by sixteen points, handing them their 30th consecutive victory. In the other semifinal, Southern California had an easier time, beating Georgia by 24 points. This set up the championship game between the only two top seeds to advance to the Final Four.

The two teams had met twice before in regular season, both coming away with a win, but in both cases, on the opponent's home court. USC beat the Lady Techsters in Louisiana, 64–58, giving the La Tech team their only loss for the year. La Tech turned around and beat USC in Los Angeles by two points in January, one of only two losses suffered by the USC team all season.

The game came down to the final seconds. USC had a two-point lead with six seconds left in the game, and freshman star Cheryl Miller at the line for a one-and-one attempt. In the era before the three point shot, simply making the foul shot would virtually guarantee the win. But Miller missed the free throw, and the Techsters grabbed the rebound. The Lady Techsters ran up the court, where Kim Mulkey took the final shot, but it failed to go in, and USC won their first national championship.

== Records ==
In the National championship game, Jennifer White hit eight of nine free throw attempts to set a championship game record for free throw percentage.

In the same game, Cheryl Miller attempted 14 free throws, a national championship record.

The NCAA did not officially start keeping track of blocked shots in women's basketball until 1998 (it had begun doing so in the men's game in 1986). However, Anne Donovan of Old Dominion had twelve blocked shot in a regional game, two more than the official record of ten.

== Qualifying teams – automatic ==
Thirty-six teams were selected to participate in the 1983 NCAA Tournament. Fourteen conferences were eligible for an automatic bid to the 1983 NCAA tournament. (Not all conference records are available for 1983)

Automatic bids
		Record		
Qualifying school	Conference	Regular Season	Conference	Seed
Central Michigan	MAC	20–8	-–	6
Georgia	SEC	24–6	4–4	2
Illinois State	Gateway (Note: In the NCAA record books, Illinois State is officially recognized as having been a member of both the Gateway Collegiate Athletic Conference (Gateway) and the Missouri Valley Conference (MVC) in 1983, although the latter did not sponsor women's sports until the 1992–93 school year. The 1982–83 school year was the first for the Gateway, founded as a women's-only parallel to the MVC. In 1985, the Gateway added football as its only men's sport. After the women's side of the Gateway merged into the MVC in 1992, the football side remained in operation, and is now the Missouri Valley Football Conference.)	20–9	-–	6
Indiana	Big Ten	18–10	-–	6
Louisville	Metro (Note: The NCAA recognized a Metro Conference champion, although that league would not sponsor women's sports until the 1983–84 school year.)	20–9	-–	7
Maryland	ACC	25–4	10–3	3
Missouri	Big Eight	23–5	-–	4
Old Dominion	Sun Belt	26–5	-–	2
Oregon State	Northern Pacific	23–5	-–	3
Penn State	Atlantic 10	24–6	-–	5
USC	Western Collegiate	25–2	-–	1
St. John's	Big East	23–5	-–	7
Texas	Southwest	28–2	-–	2
Utah	High Country	22–6	-–	5

== Qualifying teams – at-large ==
Twenty-two additional teams were selected to complete the thirty-six invitations. (Not all conference records are available for 1983) OR - Opening Round

At-large bids
		Record		
Qualifying school	Conference	Regular Season	Conference	Seed
Arizona State	Western Collegiate	22–6	9–5	4
Auburn	SEC	23–7	6–2	5
Cheyney State	Independent	26–2	-–-	1
Dartmouth	Ivy League	18–7	11–1	OR
Florida State	Metro	24–5	-–	5
Jackson State	SWAC	21–7	-–	OR
Kansas State	Big Eight	24–5	-–	3
Kentucky	SEC	23–4	6–2	3
La Salle	East Coast	16–12	-–	OR
Long Beach State	Independent	22–6	-–	2
Louisiana Tech	Independent	27–1	-–-	1
Middle Tennessee State	Ohio Valley	25–4	10–0	OR
Ole Miss	SEC	25–5	6–2	4
Monmouth	Cosmopolitan	14–14	-–	OR
Montana	Mountain West Athletic	26–3	-–	OR
North Carolina	ACC	22–7	10–3	7
North Carolina State	ACC	22–7	12–1	4
Northeast Louisiana	Southland	21–5	-–	OR
South Carolina State	MEAC	16–7	-–	OR
Stephen F. Austin	Southland	18–6	-–	7
Tennessee	SEC	23–7	7–1	1
UCLA	Western Collegiate	18–10	-–	6

== Bids by conference ==
Twenty-two conferences earned an automatic bid. In sixteen cases, the automatic bid was the only representative from the conference. Thirteen at-large teams were selected from six of the conferences. In addition, three independent (not associated with an athletic conference) teams earned at-large bids.

Bids	Conference	Teams
5	SEC	Auburn, Georgia, Kentucky, Ole Miss, Tennessee
3	ACC	Maryland, North Carolina, North Carolina State
3	Independent	Cheyney, Long Beach State, Louisiana Tech
3	Western Collegiate	Arizona State, UCLA, USC
2	Big 8	Kansas State, Missouri
2	Metro	Florida State, Louisville
2	Southland	Northeast Louisiana, Stephen F. Austin
1	Atlantic 10	Penn State
1	Big East	St. John's
1	Big Ten	Indiana
1	Cosmopolitan	Monmouth
1	East Coast	La Salle
1	Gateway	Illinois State
1	High Country	Utah
1	Ivy League	Dartmouth
1	MAC	Central Michigan
1	MEAC	South Carolina State
1	Mountain West Athletic	Montana
1	Northern Pacific	Oregon State
1	OVC	Middle Tennessee State
1	Southwest	Texas
1	Sun Belt	Old Dominion
1	SWAC	Jackson State

== Bids by state ==
The thirty-six teams represented twenty-four states, plus Washington, D.C. California and Pennsylvania had the most teams with three each. Twenty-six states did not have any teams receiving bids.

NCAA Women's basketball Tournament invitations by state 1983

Bids	State	Teams
3	California	Southern California, Long Beach St., UCLA
3	Pennsylvania	Penn St., Cheyney, La Salle
2	Kentucky	Louisville, Kentucky
2	Louisiana	Louisiana Tech, Northeast Louisiana
2	Mississippi	Jackson St., Ole Miss
2	North Carolina	North Carolina, North Carolina St.
2	Tennessee	Middle Tenn., Tennessee
2	Texas	Texas, Stephen F. Austin
1	Alabama	Auburn
1	Arizona	Arizona St.
1	Florida	Florida State
1	Georgia	Georgia
1	Illinois	Illinois St..
1	Indiana	Indiana
1	Kansas	Kansas St.
1	Maryland	Maryland
1	Michigan	Central Michigan
1	Missouri	Missouri
1	Montana	Montana
1	New Hampshire	Dartmouth
1	New Jersey	Monmouth
1	New York	St. John's NY
1	Oregon	Oregon St.
1	South Carolina	South Carolina St.
1	Utah	Utah
1	Virginia	Old Dominion

== First round ==
1983 NCAA opening round
1983 NCAA first round

In 1983, the field expanded from 32 to 36 teams. The teams were seeded, and assigned to four geographic regions, with seeds 1-9 in each region. The 8 and 9 seeds in each region played a play-in game, called the opening round (OR). In the opening round and Round 1, the higher seed was given the opportunity to host the first-round game, and all but one of the higher seeds hosted. Missouri was a 4 seed, but unable to host, so the game was played at 5 seed Auburn.

The following table lists the region, host school, venue and location. The opening round games are denoted with "OR".

Region	Host	Venue	City	State
OR West	Northeast Louisiana University	Ewing Coliseum	Monroe	Louisiana
OR East	Dartmouth College	Alumni Gymnasium	Hanover	New Hampshire
OR Mideast	La Salle University	Hayman Hall (Tom Gola Arena)	Philadelphia	Pennsylvania
OR Midwest	Jackson State University	Williams Assembly Center	Jackson	Mississippi
East	Old Dominion University	Old Dominion University Fieldhouse	Norfolk	Virginia
East	University of Maryland, College Park	Cole Field House	College Park	Maryland
East	Cheyney State University of Pennsylvania	Cope Hall	Cheyney	Pennsylvania
East	North Carolina State University	Reynolds Coliseum	Raleigh	North Carolina
Mideast	University of Tennessee	Stokely Athletic Center	Knoxville	Tennessee
Mideast	University of Kentucky	Memorial Coliseum	Lexington	Kentucky
Mideast	University of Mississippi	Tad Smith Coliseum	Oxford	Mississippi
Mideast	University of Georgia	Georgia Coliseum (Stegeman Coliseum)	Athens	Georgia
Midwest	Kansas State University	Ahearn Field House	Manhattan	Kansas
Midwest	Louisiana Tech University	Thomas Assembly Center	Ruston	Louisiana
Midwest	Auburn University	Memorial Coliseum (Beard–Eaves–Memorial Coliseum)	Auburn	Alabama
Midwest	University of Texas at Austin	Frank Erwin Center	Austin	Texas
West	California State University, Long Beach	University Gym (Gold Mine)	Long Beach	California
West	Arizona State University	University Activity Center (Wells Fargo Arena)	Tempe	Arizona
West	University of Southern California	Los Angeles Memorial Sports Arena	Los Angeles	California
West	Oregon State University	Gill Coliseum	Corvallis	Oregon

== Regionals and Final Four ==
1983 NCAA regionals and Final Four

The regionals, named for the general location, were held from March 24 to March 27 at these sites:

- East Regional Recreation Building (Rec Hall), University Park, Pennsylvania (Host: Pennsylvania State University )
- Midwest Regional Thomas Assembly Center, Ruston, Louisiana (Host: Louisiana Tech University)
- Mideast Regional Athletic & Convocation Center, Notre Dame, Indiana (Host: University of Notre Dame)
- West Regional Pauley Pavilion, Los Angeles, California (Host: University of California, Los Angeles)

Each regional winner advanced to the Final Four, held April 1 and 3 in Norfolk, Virginia, at the Norfolk Scope. Old Dominion University served as the host institution.

== Brackets ==
=== East regional – Penn State University - University Park, PA (Rec Hall) ===
Opening round March 15
Dartmouth	58
Monmouth	77

First round March 18 and 19
1	Cheyney	107
8	Monmouth	35
4	N.C. State	80
5	Penn State	94
3	Maryland	94
6	Central Michigan	71
2	Old Dominion	86
7	St John's	63

Regional semifinals March 24 and 25
1	Cheyney	72
5	Penn St.	73
3	Maryland	57
2	Old Dominion	74

Regional finals March 26
5	Penn State	60
2	Old Dominion	74

=== Midwest regional – Louisiana Tech - Ruston, LA (Thomas Assembly Center) ===
Opening Round; March 15
Jackson State	61
MTSU	64

First round March 18 and 19
1	Louisiana Tech	91
8	MTSU	59
4	Missouri	76
5	Auburn	94
3	Kansas State	91
6	Illinois State	72
2	Texas	84
7	Louisville	55

Regional semifinals March 24 and 25
1	Louisiana Tech	81
5	Auburn	54
3	Kansas State	70
2	Texas	73^{OT}

Regional finals March 27
1	Louisiana Tech	72
2	Texas	58

=== Mideast regional – Notre Dame - Notre Dame, IN Edmund P. Joyce Center ===
Opening round March 16
La Salle	67
South Carolina State	85

First round March 18 and 19
1	Tennessee	86
8	South Carolina State	51
4	Ole Miss	86
5	Florida State	76
3	Kentucky	76
6	Indiana	87
2	Georgia	72
7	North Carolina	70

Regional semifinals March 24 and 25
1	Tennessee	90^{3OT}
4	Ole Miss	83
6	Indiana	70
2	Georgia	86

Regional finals March 26
1	Tennessee	63
2	Georgia	67

=== West regional – UCLA - Los Angeles, CA (Pauley Pavilion) ===
Opening round March 15
Northeast Louisiana	72
Montana	53

First round March 18–19
1	Southern California	99
8	Northeast Louisiana	85
4	Arizona State	78
5	Utah	64
3	Oregon State	75
6	UCLA	62
2	Long Beach State	88
7	Stephen F. Austin	61

Regional semifinals March 24–25
1	Southern California	96
4	Arizona State	59
3	Oregon State	72
2	Long Beach State	92

Regional finals March 27
1	Southern California	81
2	Long Beach State	74

=== Final Four – Norfolk, Virginia ===
National semifinals April 1
2E	Old Dominion	55
1MW	Louisiana Tech	71
2ME	Georgia	57
1W	Southern California	81

National championship April 3
1MW	Louisiana Tech	67
1W	Southern California	69

== Record by conference ==
Fifteen conferences had more than one bid, or at least one win in NCAA Tournament play:

Conference	# of Bids	Record	Win %	Round of 32	Sweet Sixteen	Elite Eight	Final Four	Championship Game
Southeastern	5	7–5	.583	4	4	2	1	–
Independent	3	7–3	.700	3	3	2	1	1
Western Collegiate	3	6–2	.750	2	2	1	1	1
Atlantic Coast	3	1–3	.250	1	1	–	–	–
Big Eight	2	1–2	.333	1	1	–	–	–
Southland	2	1–2	.333	–	–	–	–	–
Metro	2	0–2	–	–	–	–	–	–
Sun Belt	1	3–1	.750	1	1	1	1	–
Atlantic 10	1	2–1	.667	1	1	1	–	–
Southwest	1	2–1	.667	1	1	1	–	–
Big Ten	1	1–1	.500	1	1	–	–	–
Cosmopolitan	1	1–1	.500	–	–	–	–	–
Mid-Eastern	1	1–1	.500	–	–	–	–	–
Northern Pacific	1	1–1	.500	1	1	–	–	–
Ohio Valley	1	1–1	.500	–	–	–	–	–

Eight conferences went 0-1: Big East, East Coast, Gateway, High Country, Ivy League, MAC, Mountain West Athletic, and SWAC

== All-Tournament team ==
- Cheryl Miller, Southern California
- Paula McGee, Southern California
- Janice Lawrence, Louisiana Tech
- Jennifer White, Louisiana Tech
- Anne Donovan, Old Dominion

== Game officials ==
- Jan Donahue (semifinal)
- Skip Gill (semifinal)
- Kit Robinson (semifinal, final)
- Pete Stewart (semifinal, final)

== See also ==
- NCAA Women's Division I Basketball Championship
- 1983 NCAA Division I men's basketball tournament
