= 1981–82 Louisiana Tech Lady Techsters basketball team =

1981-82 Louisiana Tech women's basketball season

1981–82 Louisiana Tech Lady Techsters basketball

NCAA tournament National Champions
- Conference: Independent

Ranking
- AP: No. 1
- Record: 35–1
- Head coach: Sonja Hogg (8th season)
- Associate head coach: Leon Barmore
- Assistant coach: Gary Blair
- Home arena: Memorial Gymnasium

The 1981–82 Louisiana Tech Lady Techsters basketball team represented Louisiana Tech University during the 1981–82 NCAA Division I women's basketball season. The team was led by eighth–year head coach Sonja Hogg, who guided the team to a 35–1 record and the 1982 NCAA Division I championship. This was the program's second consecutive championship, following an AIAW championship in 1981. The team played their home games for the final season at Memorial Gymnasium in Ruston, Louisiana as an NCAA independent.

The Lady Techsters won their first 20 games of the season to extend the program's win streak to 54 games. Louisiana Tech lost at Old Dominion, 61–58, but re-focused to close the season with a 15-game win streak to capture the inaugural NCAA women's basketball championship.

In 2017, the Lady Techsters received their championship rings after 35 years.

== Previous season ==
The Lady Techsters finished the 1980–81 season with a perfect 34–0 record as an independent. They won the final AIAW tournament championship over Tennessee, 79–59.

== Roster ==
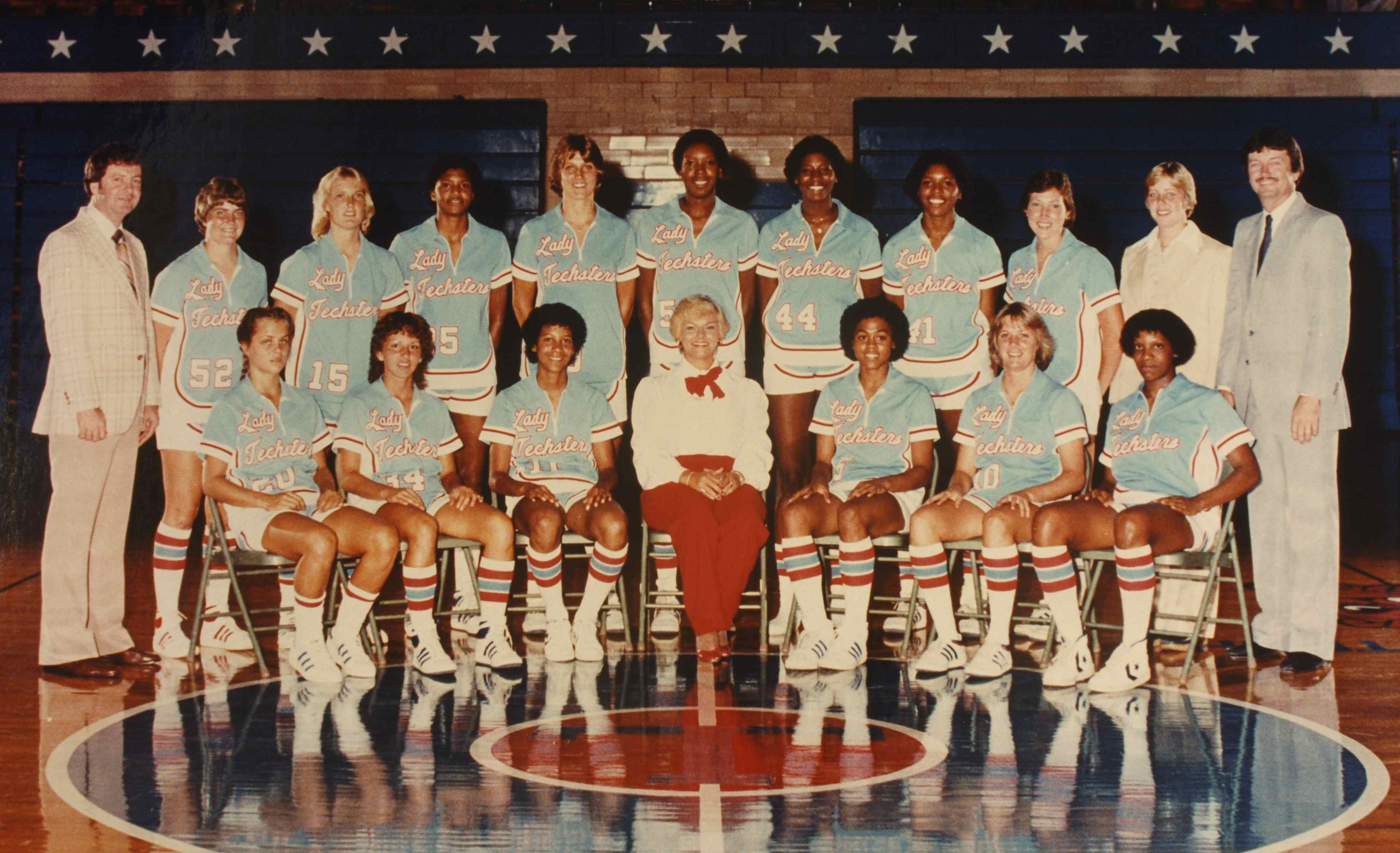
1981–82 Louisiana Tech Lady Techsters basketball team

1981–82 Louisiana Tech Lady Techsters women's basketball team
Players
Coaches

Pos.	#	Name	Height	Year	Hometown
G	5	Angela Turner	5 ft 8 in (1.73 m)	Sr	Saline, Louisiana
G	10	Julie Wilkerson	5 ft 8 in (1.73 m)	Jr	Tioga, Louisiana
G	15	Jennifer White	5 ft 9 in (1.75 m)	Jr	Loretto, Tennessee
G	20	Kim Mulkey	5 ft 4 in (1.63 m)	So	Hammond, Louisiana
F	25	Lori Scott	5 ft 10 in (1.78 m)	Jr	Jackson, Mississippi
G	34	Debbie Primeaux	5 ft 2 in (1.57 m)	So	Bell City, Louisiana
C	41	Pam Kelly	6 ft 0 in (1.83 m)	Sr	Columbia, Louisiana
F	44	Debra Rodman	6 ft 2 in (1.88 m)	So	Dallas, Texas
C	51	Janice Lawrence	6 ft 3 in (1.91 m)	So	Lucedale, Mississippi
G	52	Rita Rust	5 ft 7 in (1.7 m)	Sr	Shreveport, Louisiana

Head coach

- Sonja Hogg

Assistant coach(es)

- Leon Barmore
- Gary Blair

Legend

- (C) Team captain
- (S) Suspended
- (I) Ineligible
- (W) Walk-on
- Injured
- Current redshirt

== Schedule and results ==
Date time, TV	Rank^{#}	Opponent^{#}	Result	Record	Site (attendance) city, state
Regular season
Nov 26, 1981*	No. 1	vs. Illinois State; Plainview Queens Classic	W 71–56	1–0	Hutcherson Center (1,000); Plainview, Texas
Nov 27, 1981*	No. 1	vs. No. 18 Stephen F. Austin; Plainview Queens Classic	W 97–59	2–0	Hutcherson Center (1,000); Plainview, Texas
Nov 28, 1981*	No. 1	vs. No. 15 Kansas; Plainview Queens Classic	W 70–39	3–0	Hutcherson Center (2,400); Plainview, Texas
Dec 1, 1981*	No. 1	Mississippi College	W 100–55	4–0	Memorial Gymnasium (4,250); Ruston, Louisiana
Dec 4, 1981*	No. 1	at New Orleans	W 106–59	5–0	Human Performance Center (1,940); New Orleans, Louisiana
Dec 5, 1981*	No. 1	at McNeese State	W 80–38	6–0	(3,200); Lake Charles, Louisiana
Dec 10, 1981*	No. 1	at Valdosta State	W 97–54	7–0	Memorial Gymnasium (2,800); Ruston, Louisiana
Dec 11, 1981*	No. 1	at Tulane	W 103–50	8–0	Memorial Gymnasium (2,800); Ruston, Louisiana
Dec 12, 1981*	No. 1	at Illinois State	W 67–42	9–0	Memorial Gymnasium (4,200); Ruston, Louisiana
Dec 19, 1981*	No. 1	vs. No. 6 Rutgers; Hanover Classic	W 83–73	10–0	Madison Square Garden; New York, New York
Dec 20, 1981*	No. 1	vs. No. 3 Old Dominion; Hanover Classic	W 68–51	11–0	Madison Square Garden; New York, New York
Dec 27, 1981*	No. 1	Northeast Louisiana	W 102–47	12–0	Memorial Gymnasium; Ruston, Louisiana
Jan 29, 1982*	No. 1	at No. 7 Old Dominion	L 58–61	20–1	Norfolk Scope; Norfolk, Virginia
Feb 22, 1982*	No. 1	UCLA	W 103–63	27–1	Memorial Gymnasium; Ruston, Louisiana
Feb 26, 1982*	No. 1	at Oklahoma	W 101–57	28–1	Lloyd Noble Center; Norman, Oklahoma
March 2, 1982*	No. 1	at Oral Roberts	W 89–51	29–1	Mabee Center; Tulsa, Oklahoma
March 5, 1982*	No. 1	at Mississippi College	W 94–52	30–1	A. E. Wood Coliseum; Clinton, Mississippi
NCAA tournament
Mar 12, 1982*	(1 MW) No. 1	(8 MW) Tennessee Tech; Regional Semifinal – Sweet Sixteen	W 114–53	31–1	Memorial Gymnasium; Ruston, Louisiana
Mar 18, 1982*	(1 MW) No. 1	(4 MW) No. 17 Arizona State; Regional Semifinal – Sweet Sixteen	W 92–54	32–1	Memorial Gymnasium; Ruston, Louisiana
Mar 21, 1982*	(1 MW) No. 1	(2 MW) No. 14 Kentucky; Regional Final – Elite Eight	W 82–60	33–1	Memorial Gymnasium; Ruston, Louisiana
Mar 26, 1982*	(1 MW) No. 1	vs. (2 ME) No. 8 Tennessee; National Semifinal – Final Four	W 69–46	34–1	Norfolk Scope; Norfolk, Virginia
Mar 28, 1982*	(1 MW) No. 1	vs. (2 E) No. 2 Cheyney State; National Championship	W 76–62	35–1	Norfolk Scope; Norfolk, Virginia
*Non-conference game. ^{#}Rankings from AP Poll. (#) Tournament seedings in parentheses. MW=Midwest. All times are in Central.

== Rankings ==
Ranking movements
	Week																	
Poll	1	2	3	4	5	6	7	8	9	10	11	12	13	14	15	16	17	Final
AP	1	1	1	1	1	1	1	1	1	1	1	1	1	1	1	1	1	1

== Awards and honors ==
- Wade Trophy winner (Pam Kelly)
