= 1982 NCAA Division I women's basketball tournament =

- Teams: 32
- Finals site: Norfolk Scope, Norfolk, Virginia
- Champions: Louisiana Tech (1st title, 1st title game, 1st Final Four)
- Runner-up: Cheyney State (1st title game, 1st Final Four)
- Semifinalists: Maryland (1st Final Four); Tennessee (1st Final Four)
- Winning coach: Sonja Hogg (1st title)
- MOP: Janice Lawrence (Louisiana Tech)
- Attendance: 66,924

The 1982 NCAA Division I women's basketball tournament was the first women's basketball tournament held under the auspices of the NCAA. From 1972 to 1982, there were national tournaments for Division I schools held under the auspices of the AIAW. The inaugural NCAA tournament included 32 teams. Tennessee, Louisiana Tech, Cheyney State, and Maryland met in the Final Four, held at the Norfolk Scope in Norfolk, Virginia and hosted by Old Dominion University, with Louisiana Tech defeating Cheyney for the title, 76-62. Louisiana Tech's Janice Lawrence was named the Most Outstanding Player of the tournament. Her teammate Kim Mulkey went on to become the first (and to date only) woman to win NCAA Division I basketball titles as a player and coach, winning the 2005, 2012, 2019 titles as head coach at Baylor and the 2023 title at LSU. (Mulkey was also an assistant coach on Louisiana Tech's 1988 championship team).

== Notable events ==
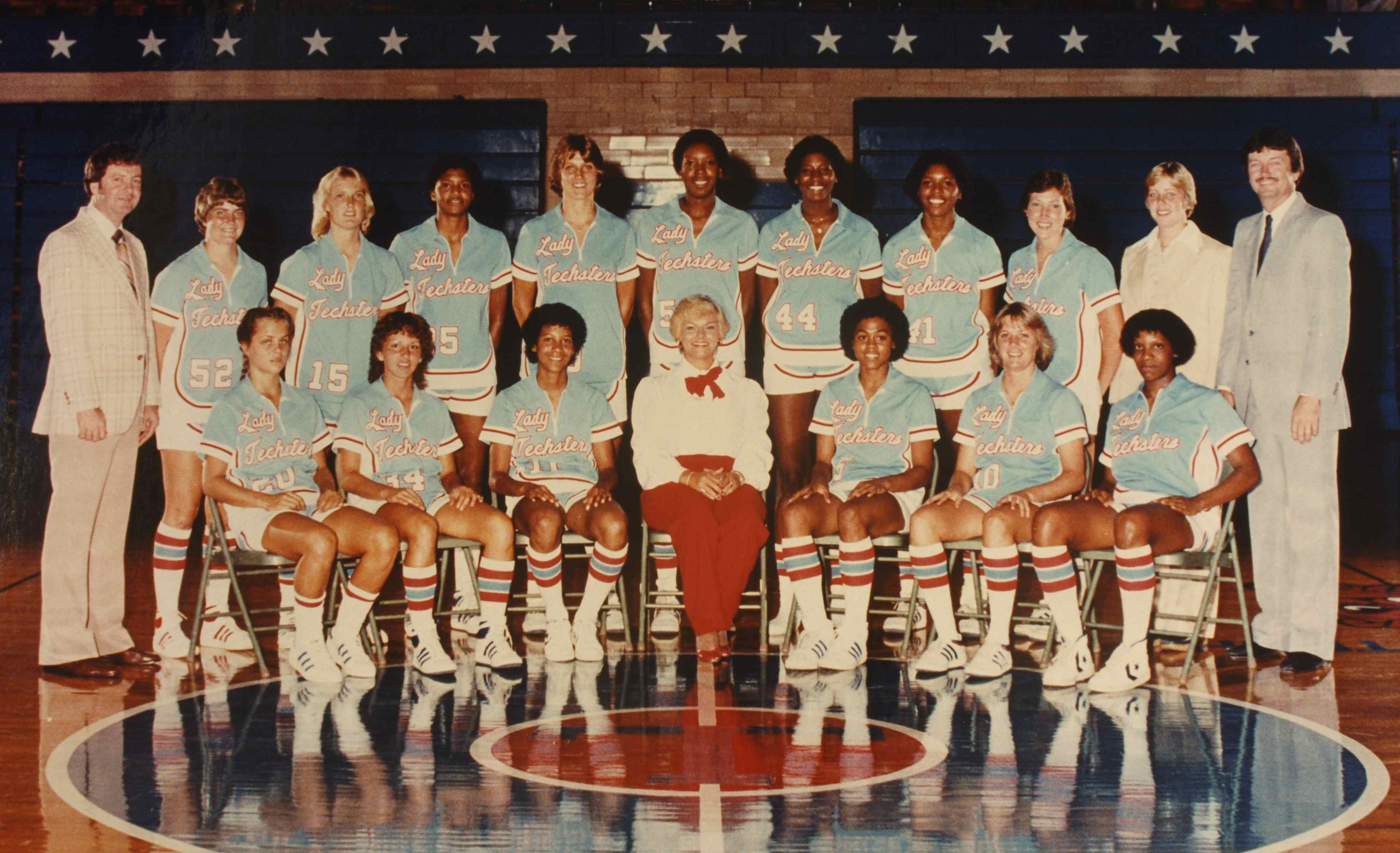
Louisiana Tech women's basketball team

While the 1982 tournament was the first tournament under the NCAA, many of the participating teams had a long history of tournament experience. The Louisiana Tech team made it to the Final Four of the 1979, 1980 and 1981 AIAW tournaments, winning the national championship with a perfect 34–0 record in 1981. The Lady Techsters were favorites to repeat, as their team entered the 1982 NCAA tournament with only a single loss on the season. The team included two Kodak All-Americans, Pam Kelly and Angela Turner. Pam Kelly would win the Wade Trophy, awarded to the nation's best Division I women's basketball player. Her teammates included Janice Lawrence and Kim Mulkey, both of whom would play on the gold-medal-winning Olympic team in 1984. The team had two head coaches. Sonja Hogg had been head coach of the team since its formation in 1974. Hogg brought Leon Barmore on to the coaching staff in 1977. In 1982, Barmore shared head coaching duties with Hogg, which he would do until 1985, when Hogg stepped down.

The Louisiana Tech team won their first game easily, beating Tennessee Tech 114–52. They easily won their next two games against Arizona State and Kentucky, to advance to the Final Four, the only number one seed to make it to the finals.

The Lady Techsters faced the Lady Vols from Tennessee in the semi-finals, and won 69–46. In the National Championship game, they faced Cheyney State, coached by future Hall of Fame coach C. Vivian Stringer. The Cheyney State team entered the match-up on a 23-game winning streak. The Louisiana Tech team hit 56% of their field goals attempts to win easily, 76–62, and win the first National Championship in the NCAA era.

The winners are awarded national championship rings, but this team did not receive theirs until January 13, 2017.

== Records ==
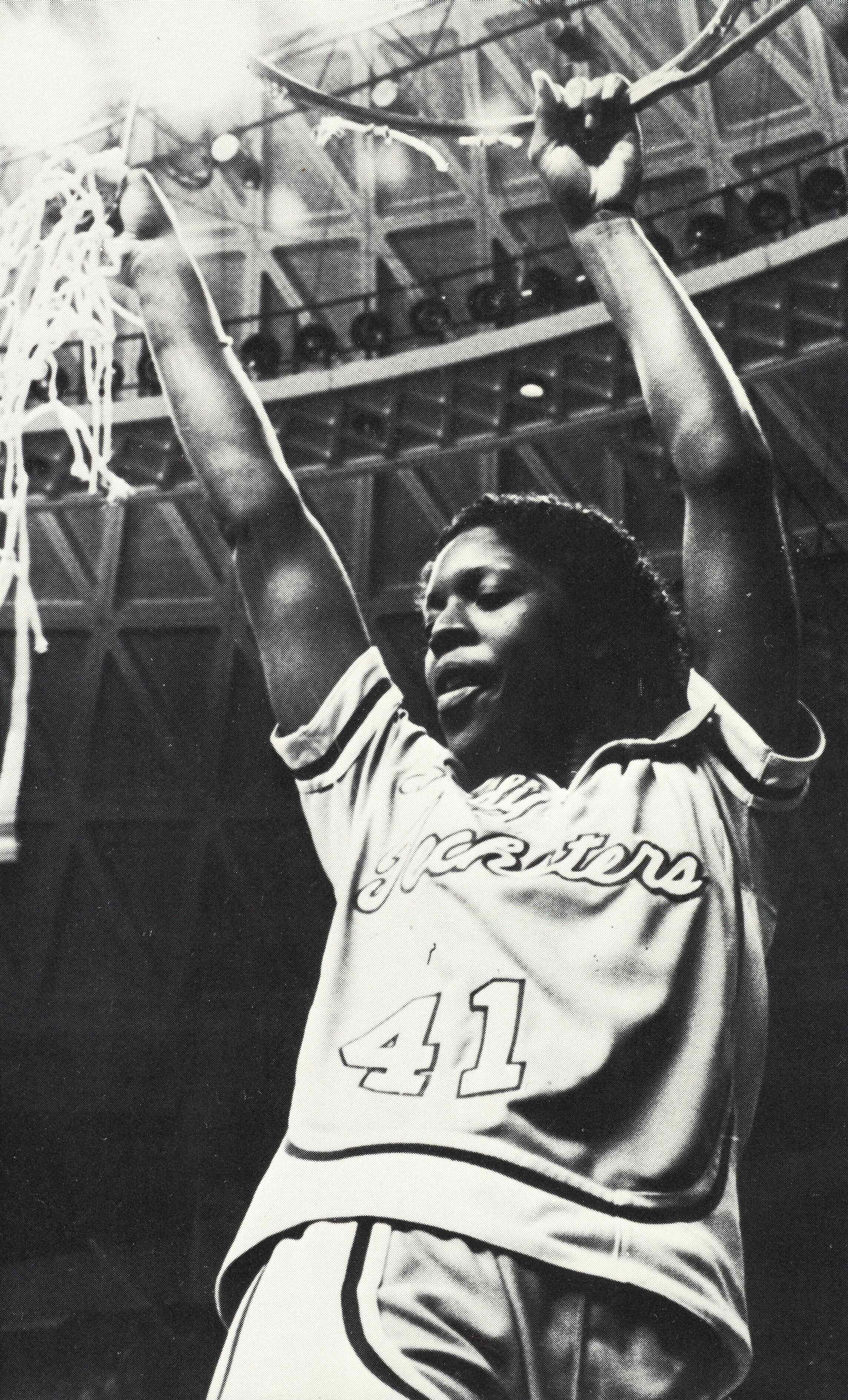
Pam Kelly cutting down the nets after the 1982 NCAA women's basketball tournament championship win

In the semifinal game between Louisiana Tech and Tennessee, Louisiana Tech's Pam Kelly made 12 of 14 free throw attempts. As of 2015, 12 made free throws, equaled twice since, remains the women's Final Four game record for most free throws.

In the west regional final between Drake and Maryland, Lorri Bauman scored 50 points in a losing effort. Her scoring mark is still the single-game record for an NCAA tournament game. Her 21 made field goals, out of 35 attempts, both of which remain as single game tournament records. In the first-round game against Ohio State, Bauman hit all 16 of her free throws. While several players have subsequently made all of their attempted free throws, no one has a perfect record with more than 16.

In the three games of her tournament, Bauman scored a total of 110 points, for an average of 36.7 points per game. As of 2012, no player has surpassed that per game scoring mark.

Bauman's 50-point performance qualified as one of the top 25 moments of NCAA tournament history as chronicled by ESPN and NCAA.com as part of the 25th anniversary celebration of NCAA women's basketball.

== Qualifying teams ==
=== Automatic bids ===
Thirty-two teams were selected to participate in the 1982 NCAA tournament. Twelve conferences were eligible for an automatic bid. (Not all conference records are available for 1982.)

Automatic Bids
		Record		
Qualifying School	Conference	Regular season	Conference	Seed
Long Beach State	Western Collegiate	22–5	-–	1
Kentucky	SEC	22–7	-–	2
Maryland	ACC	22–6	6–1	2
Memphis State	Metro (Note: The NCAA recognized a Metro Conference champion, although the league did not sponsor women's sports until the 1983–84 school year.)	25–4	–	3
Drake	Missouri Valley (Note: The NCAA recognized a MVC champion, although the league did not sponsor women's sports until the 1992–93 school year. The Gateway Collegiate Athletic Conference, which began as a women's-only parallel to the MVC before evolving into today's Missouri Valley Football Conference and had Drake as a member throughout its history as a women's conference, was not founded until the 1982–83 school year.)	26–6	-–	4
Kansas State	Big Eight	24–5	-–	4
Ohio State	Big Ten	19–6	-–	5
Jackson State	SWAC	28–7	-–	7
Stanford	Northern California	19–7	9–3	7
Howard	MEAC (Note: The NCAA recognized a MEAC champion, although the league did not sponsor women's sports until the 1983–84 school year.)	14–10	-–	8
Kent State	MAC	17–13	-–	8
Saint Peter's	MAAC	25–4	5–0	8

=== At-large bids ===
Twenty additional teams were selected to complete the thirty-two invitations. (Not all conference records are available for 1982.)

At-large Bids
Qualifying School	Conference	Record		Seed;
Qualifying School	Conference	Regular season	Conference	Seed;
Louisiana Tech	Independent	30–1	-–-	1
Old Dominion	Independent	21–5	-–-	1
USC	Western Collegiate	20–3	-–	1
Cheyney State	Independent	24–2	-–	2
Tennessee	SEC	19–9	-–	2
North Carolina State	ACC	23–5	11–2	3
Oregon	Independent	20–4	-–	3
South Carolina	Independent	21–7	-–-	3
Arizona State	Western Collegiate	23–6	-–	4
Penn State	Independent	23–5	-–-	4
Clemson	ACC	20–11	6–3	5
Georgia	SEC	21–8	-–	5
Stephen F. Austin	Independent	15–8	-–-	5
East Carolina	Independent	19–7	-–-	6
Ole Miss	SEC	27–4	–	6
Missouri	Big Eight	23–8	–	6
Northwestern	Big Ten	21–7	-–	6
Auburn	SEC	24–4	-–	7
Illinois	Big Ten	21–8	-–	7
Tennessee Tech	Ohio Valley Conference	20–10	-–	8

=== Bids by conference ===
Bids	Conference	Teams
8	Independent	Cheyney, East Carolina, Louisiana Tech, Old Dominion, Oregon, Penn St., South Carolina, Stephen F. Austin
5	SEC	Auburn, Georgia, Kentucky, Ole Miss, Tennessee
3	Western Collegiate	Arizona St., Long Beach St., Southern California
3	Big Ten	Illinois, Northwestern, Ohio St.
3	ACC	Clemson, Maryland, North Carolina St.
2	Big 8	Kansas St., Missouri
1	SWAC	Jackson St.
1	Ohio Valley	Tennessee Tech
1	Northern California	Stanford
1	Missouri Valley	Drake
1	MEAC	Howard
1	MAC	Kent St.
1	Metro	Memphis
1	MAAC	St. Peter's

== First round ==
The thirty-two teams were seeded, and assigned to sixteen locations. In each case, the higher seed was given the opportunity to host the first-round game, and all sixteen teams hosted.

The following table lists the region, host school, venue and location, while a map of the locations is shown to the right:

1982 NCAA first round

Region	Host	Venue	City	State
East	Old Dominion University	Old Dominion University Fieldhouse	Norfolk	Virginia
East	Cheyney State College	Cope Hall	Cheyney	Pennsylvania
East	Kansas State University	Ahearn Field House	Manhattan	Kansas
East	North Carolina State University	Reynolds Coliseum	Raleigh	North Carolina
Mideast	University of Southern California	Los Angeles Memorial Sports Arena	Los Angeles	California
Mideast	Pennsylvania State University	Recreation Building (Rec Hall)	University Park	Pennsylvania
Mideast	Memphis State University	MSU Fieldhouse (Elma Roane Fieldhouse )	Memphis	Tennessee
Mideast	University of Tennessee	Stokely Athletic Center	Knoxville	Tennessee
Midwest	Louisiana Tech University	Memorial Gym	Ruston	Louisiana
Midwest	Arizona State University	University Activity Center (Wells Fargo Arena)	Tempe	Arizona
Midwest	University of South Carolina	Carolina Coliseum	Columbia	South Carolina
Midwest	University of Kentucky	Memorial Coliseum	Lexington	Kentucky
West	California State University, Long Beach	University Gym (Gold Mine)	Long Beach	California
West	Drake University	Drake Fieldhouse	Des Moines	Iowa
West	University of Oregon	McArthur Court	Eugene	Oregon
West	University of Maryland, College Park	Cole Field House	College Park	Maryland

== Regionals and Final Four ==
1982 NCAA Regionals and Final Four

The Regionals, named for the general location, were held from March 18 to March 21 at these sites:

- East Regional Reynolds Coliseum, Raleigh, North Carolina (Host: North Carolina State University)
- Mideast Regional Stokely Athletic Center, Knoxville, Tennessee (Host: University of Tennessee)
- Midwest Regional Memorial Gym, Ruston, Louisiana (Host: Louisiana Tech University)
- West Regional Maples Pavilion, Stanford, California (Host: Stanford University)

Each regional winner advanced to the Final Four, held March 26 and 28 in Norfolk, Virginia at the Norfolk Scope. Old Dominion University was the host institution.

== Bids by state ==
The thirty-two teams came from twenty-one states, plus Washington, D.C. California and Tennessee had the most teams with three each. Twenty-nine states did not have any teams receiving bids.

NCAA Women's basketball Tournament invitations by state 1982

Bids	State	Teams
3	California	Long Beach State, Stanford, Southern California
3	Tennessee	Memphis, Tennessee Tech, Tennessee
2	Illinois	Northwestern, Illinois
2	Mississippi	Jackson State, Ole Miss
2	North Carolina	North Carolina State, East Carolina
2	Ohio	Ohio State, Kent State
2	Pennsylvania	Cheyney, Penn State
2	South Carolina	South Carolina, Clemson
1	Alabama	Auburn
1	Arizona	Arizona State
1	District of Columbia	Howard
1	Georgia	Georgia
1	Iowa	Drake
1	Kansas	Kansas State
1	Kentucky	Kentucky
1	Louisiana	Louisiana Tech
1	Maryland	Maryland
1	Missouri	Missouri
1	New Jersey	Saint Peter's
1	Oregon	Oregon
1	Texas	Stephen F. Austin
1	Virginia	Old Dominion

== Brackets ==
=== Mideast Regional - University of Tennessee - Knoxville, TN (Stokely Athletic Center) ===
First round March 12 and 13
1	Southern California (20‍–‍3)	99
8	Kent State (17‍–‍13)	55
4	Penn State (23‍–‍5)	96
5	Clemson (20‍–‍11)	75
3	Memphis State (25‍–‍4)	72
6	Ole Miss (27‍–‍4)	70
2	Tennessee (19‍–‍9)	72
7	Jackson State (28‍–‍7)	56

Regional semifinals March 18 and 19
1	Southern California	73
4	Penn State	70
3	Memphis State	63
2	Tennessee	78

Regional finals March 20
1	Southern California	90
2	Tennessee	91^{OT}

=== Midwest Regional - Louisiana Tech - Ruston, LA (Memorial Gymnasium) ===
First round March 12 and 14
1	Louisiana Tech (30‍–‍1)	114
8	Tennessee Tech (20‍–‍10)	53
4	Arizona State (23‍–‍6)	97
5	Georgia (21‍–‍8)	77
3	South Carolina (21‍–‍7)	79
6	East Carolina (17‍–‍9)	54
2	Kentucky (22‍–‍7)	88
7	Illinois (21‍–‍8)	80

Regional semifinals March 18
1	Louisiana Tech	92
4	Arizona State	54
3	South Carolina	69
2	Kentucky	73

Regional finals March 21
1	Louisiana Tech	82
2	Kentucky	60

=== East Regional - North Carolina State - Raleigh, NC (Reynolds Coliseum) ===
First round March 13
1	Old Dominion (21‍–‍5)	75
8	Saint Peter's (25‍–‍4)	42
4	Kansas State (24‍–‍5)	78
5	Stephen F. Austin (15‍–‍8)	75
3	North Carolina State (23‍–‍5)	75
6	Northwestern (21‍–‍7)	71
2	Cheyney State (24‍–‍2)	75
7	Auburn (24‍–‍4)	64

Regional semifinals March 18
1	Old Dominion	67
4	Kansas State	76
3	North Carolina State	61
2	Cheyney State	74

Regional finals March 20
4	Kansas State	71
2	Cheyney State	93

=== West Regional - Stanford University - Palo Alto, CA (Maples Pavilion) ===
First round March 12–14
1	Long Beach State (22‍–‍5)	95
8	Howard (14‍–‍10)	57
4	Drake (26‍–‍6)	90
5	Ohio State (19‍–‍6)	79
3	Oregon (20‍–‍4)	53
6	Missouri (23‍–‍8)	59
2	Maryland (22‍–‍6)	82
7	Stanford (19‍–‍7)	48

Regional semifinals March 19
1	Long Beach State	78
4	Drake	91
6	Missouri	68
2	Maryland	80

Regional finals March 21
4	Drake	78
2	Maryland	89

=== Final Four - Old Dominion - Norfolk, VA ===
National Semifinals; March 26
2ME	Tennessee	46
1MW	Louisiana Tech	69
2E	Cheyney State	76
2W	Maryland	66

National Championship; March 28
1MW	Louisiana Tech	76
2E	Cheyney State	62

== Record by conference ==
Eight conferences had more than one bid, or at least one win in NCAA tournament play:

Conference	# of Bids	Record	Win %	Round of 32	Sweet Sixteen	Elite Eight	Final Four	Championship Game
Independent	8	12–7	.632	5	5	2	2	2
Southeastern	5	5–5	.500	2	2	2	1	–
Atlantic Coast	3	4–3	.571	2	2	1	1	–
Western Collegiate	3	4–3	.571	3	3	1	–	–
Big Ten	3	0–3	.000	–	–	–	–	–
Big Eight	2	3–2	.600	2	2	1	–	–
Missouri Valley	1	2–1	.667	1	1	1	–	–
Metro	1	1–1	.500	1	1	–	–	–

Six conferences went 0–1: MAAC, MAC, MEAC, Northern California, Ohio Valley Conference, and SWAC

== All-Tournament Team ==
- Janice Lawrence, Louisiana Tech
- Pam Kelly, Louisiana Tech
- Kim Mulkey, Louisiana Tech
- Yolanda Laney, Cheyney
- Valerie Walker, Cheyney

== Game officials ==
- David Sell (semifinal)
- Pete Stewart (semifinal)
- Marcy Weston (semifinal, final)
- Dan Woolridge (semifinal, final)

== See also ==
- 1982 NCAA Division II women's basketball tournament
- 1982 NCAA Division III women's basketball tournament
- 1982 AIAW National Division I Basketball Championship
- 1982 NAIA women's basketball tournament
- 1982 NCAA Division I men's basketball tournament
