= 1988 NCAA Division I women's basketball championship game =

Women's basketball championship game

NCAA Division I women's basketball championship game
National championship game
Louisiana Tech Lady Techsters	Auburn Tigers
(31–2)	(32–2)
56	54
Head coach: Leon Barmore	Head coach: Joe Ciampi
- AP: 5
- Coaches: 5
- AP: 3
- Coaches: 3
	1st half	2nd half	Total
Louisiana Tech Lady Techsters	17	39	56
Auburn Tigers	31	23	54
- Date: April 3, 1988
- Venue: Tacoma Dome, Tacoma, Washington
- MVP: Erica Westbrooks, Louisiana Tech

United States TV coverage
- Network: CBS
- Announcers: Tim Brant (play-by-play) and Mimi Griffin (analyst)

The 1988 NCAA Division I women's basketball championship game was the final game of the 1988 NCAA Division I women's basketball tournament. It determined the champion of the 1987–88 NCAA Division I women's basketball season and was contested by the Louisiana Tech Lady Techsters and the Auburn Tigers. The game was played on April 3, 1988, at the Tacoma Dome in Tacoma, Washington. After trailing 31–17 at halftime, No. 5 Louisiana Tech stormed back to defeat No. 3 Auburn 56–54 to capture the program's second NCAA national championship. Erica Westbrooks was named the tournament's Most Outstanding Player.

== Participants ==
=== Louisiana Tech Lady Techsters ===
The Lady Techsters, who represented the Louisiana Tech University in Ruston, Louisiana, were led by head coach Leon Barmore, in his 3rd season as head coach at the school. After finishing runner-up the prior season, Louisiana Tech opened this season ranked No. 5 in the AP poll and, like Auburn, spent the entirety of the season inside the top 5. They finished the regular season right back where they started – ranked No. 5 in both major polls.

In the NCAA tournament, La Tech defeated Kansas, Ole Miss, and No. 4 Texas to reach the fourth NCAA Final Four in program history. They won 68–59 over No. 1 and defending National champion Tennessee in the national semifinal to reach the national championship game with a 31–2 record. The Lady Techsters knocked off the top-ranked, defending National champions in the National semifinal for the second straight season.

=== Auburn Tigers ===
The Tigers, who represented the Auburn University in Auburn, Alabama, were led by head coach Joe Ciampi in his 9th season at the school. Auburn began the season ranked No. 3 in the AP Poll. After spending the first 14 polls at either No. 3 or No. 2, the Tigers peaked at No. 1 for two of the final three weeks before finishing the regular season back at No. 3 in both major polls.

Playing as the No. 1 seed in the Mideast region of the NCAA tournament, the Lady Tigers defeated Penn State, No. 17 Georgia (on the road), and No. 9 Maryland to reach the first Final Four in program history. In the National semifinals, Auburn defeated No. 7 Long Beach State, 68–55. The 32–2 Tigers entered the matchup with No. 5 Louisiana Tech as the slight favorite.

== Starting lineups ==
Louisiana Tech	Position	Auburn
Teresa Weatherspoon	G	Ruthie Bolton
Angela Lawson	G	
Venus Lacy	C	Vickie Orr
Nora Lewis	F	Sharon Stewart
	F	

== Game summary ==
CBS

April 3, 1988

No. 5 Louisiana Tech Lady Techsters 56, No. 3 Auburn Tigers 54
Scoring by half: 17–31, 39–23
Pts: Rebs: Asts:	Pts: Rebs: Asts:

Tacoma Dome – Tacoma, Washington

== Media coverage ==
The game was broadcast on CBS.
