= 1987–88 Tennessee Lady Volunteers basketball team =

Intercollegiate basketball season

1987–88 Tennessee Lady Volunteers basketball

SEC tournament champions

NCAA tournament, Final Four
- Conference: Southeastern Conference

Ranking
- Coaches: No. 3
- AP: No. 1
- Record: 31–3 (8–1 SEC)
- Head coach: Pat Summitt (14th season)
- Assistant coaches: Mickie DeMoss; Holly Warlick
- Home arena: Thompson–Boling Arena

1987–88 SEC women's basketball standings
	Conf.				Overall
Team	W		L	PCT	W		L	PCT
No. 3 Auburn	9	–	0	1.000	32	–	3	.914
No. 1 Tennessee^{†}	8	–	1	.889	31	–	3	.912
LSU	6	–	3	.667	18	–	11	.621
No. 12 Ole Miss	5	–	4	.556	24	–	7	.774
No. 17 Georgia	5	–	4	.556	21	–	10	.677
Alabama	5	–	4	.556	18	–	10	.643
Vanderbilt	4	–	5	.444	18	–	10	.643
Mississippi State	2	–	7	.222	19	–	13	.594
Florida	1	–	8	.111	9	–	18	.333
Kentucky	0	–	9	.000	14	–	15	.483
† 1988 SEC tournament winner Rankings from AP poll

The 1987–88 Tennessee Lady Volunteers basketball team represented the University of Tennessee as a member of the Southeastern Conference during the 1987–88 women's college basketball season. Coached by Pat Summitt, the Lady Volunteers finished 31–3 and reached the program's fifth NCAA Final Four. The Lady Vols started the season ranked No. 1 and played their home games at the brand new Thompson–Boling Arena.

== Roster ==
1987–88 Tennessee Lady Volunteers women's basketball team
Players
Coaches

Pos.	#	Name	Height	Year	Previous school	Hometown
G	4	Dawn Marsh	5 ft 6 in (1.68 m)	Sr		Alcoa, Tennessee
C	11	Kathy Spinks	6 ft 2 in (1.88 m)	Sr		Forest Hills, Kentucky
C	12	Sheila Frost	6 ft 4 in (1.93 m)	Jr		Pulaski, Tennessee
F	14	Gay Townson	5 ft 9 in (1.75 m)	Jr		Loudon, Tennessee
G	23	Kris Durham	5 ft 8 in (1.73 m)	Fr		Dunellen, New Jersey
F/C	24	Carla McGhee	6 ft 3 in (1.91 m)	So		Peoria, Illinois
F	30	Bridgette Gordon	6 ft 0 in (1.83 m)	Jr	DeLand	DeLand, Florida
C	32	Daedra Charles	6 ft 3 in (1.91 m)	Fr	Saint Martin de Porres	Detroit, Michigan
F	32	Jennifer Tuggle	6 ft 2 in (1.88 m)	Jr		Etowah, Tennessee
G	33	Tonya Edwards	5 ft 10 in (1.78 m)	So	Flint Northwestern	Flint, Michigan
F	34	Lisa Webb	5 ft 9 in (1.75 m)	Sr		Milledgeville, Georgia
G/F	35	Melissa McCray	5 ft 10 in (1.78 m)	Jr		Johnson City, Tennessee
F	42	Pearl Moore	6 ft 2 in (1.88 m)	Fr		Harriman, Tennessee

Head coach

- Pat Summitt

Assistant coach(es)

- Mickie DeMoss
- Holly Warlick

Legend

- (C) Team captain
- (S) Suspended
- (I) Ineligible
- (W) Walk-on
- Injured
- Current redshirt

Roster

== Schedule and results ==
Date time, TV	Rank^{#}	Opponent^{#}	Result	Record	Site city, state
Regular season
Nov 27, 1987*	No. 1	vs. Indiana	W 91–52	1–0	Cincinnati, Ohio
Nov 28, 1987*	No. 1	vs. No. 18 Old Dominion	W 83–52	2–0	Cincinnati, Ohio
Dec 3, 1987*	No. 1	Stetson	W 102–59	3–0	Thompson–Boling Arena; Knoxville, Tennessee
Dec 9, 1987*	No. 1	No. 2 Texas	L 78–97	3–1	Thompson–Boling Arena; Knoxville, Tennessee
Dec 13, 1987*	No. 1	at UCLA	W 89–63	4–1	Pauley Pavilion; Los Angeles, California
Dec 16, 1987*	No. 3	at Oregon State	W 91–56	5–1	Gill Coliseum; Corvallis, Oregon
Dec 19, 1987*	No. 3	Eastern Kentucky	W 115–40	6–1	Thompson–Boling Arena; Knoxville, Tennessee
Dec 20, 1987*	No. 3	Northern Illinois	W 103–76	7–1	Thompson–Boling Arena; Knoxville, Tennessee
Jan 3, 1988*	No. 3	at Illinois	W 93–59	8–1	Assembly Hall; Champaign, Illinois
Jan 5, 1988*	No. 4	Northwestern	W 78–65	9–1	Thompson–Boling Arena; Knoxville, Tennessee
Jan 9, 1988	No. 4	No. 2 Auburn	L 68–71	9–2 (0–1)	Thompson–Boling Arena; Knoxville, Tennessee
Jan 11, 1988*	No. 4	at Georgia Tech	W 96–79	10–2	Alexander Memorial Coliseum; Atlanta, Georgia
Jan 14, 1988*	No. 4	Old Dominion	W 91–68	11–2	Thompson–Boling Arena; Knoxville, Tennessee
Jan 17, 1988	No. 4	Vanderbilt	W 104–67	12–2 (1–1)	Thompson–Boling Arena; Knoxville, Tennessee
Jan 20, 1988*	No. 4	at South Carolina	W 85–80	13–2	Carolina Coliseum; Columbia, South Carolina
Jan 23, 1988	No. 4	Alabama	W 97–70	14–2 (2–1)	Thompson–Boling Arena; Knoxville, Tennessee
Jan 27, 1988*	No. 4	at Memphis State	W 97–73	15–2	Memorial Fieldhouse; Memphis Tennessee
Jan 31, 1988	No. 3	at No. 13 Georgia	W 82–79	16–2 (3–1)	Tad Smith Coliseum; Athens, Georgia
Feb 3, 1988*	No. 3	at Notre Dame	W 91–71	17–2	Joyce Center; Notre Dame, Indiana
Feb 6, 1988	No. 3	at Ole Miss	W 78–67	18–2 (4–1)	Tad Smith Coliseum; Oxford, Mississippi
Feb 8, 1988	No. 3	at Mississippi State	W 81–74	19–2 (5–1)	Humphrey Coliseum; Starkville, Mississippi
Feb 13, 1988	No. 3	LSU	W 89–82	20–2 (6–1)	Thompson–Boling Arena; Knoxville, Tennessee
Feb 15, 1988*	No. 3	No. 5 Louisiana Tech	W 76–74	21–2	Thompson–Boling Arena (7,106); Knoxville, Tennessee
Feb 18, 1988	No. 3	at Kentucky; Rivalry	W 99–75	22–2 (7–1)	Rupp Arena; Lexington, Kentucky
Feb 21, 1988	No. 3	Florida	W 108–53	23–2 (8–1)	Thompson–Boling Arena; Knoxville, Tennessee
Feb 25, 1988*	No. 3	at North Carolina	W 88–65	24–2	Carmichael Auditorium; Chapel Hill, North Carolina
Feb 27, 1988*	No. 3	Tennessee State	W 104–51	25–2	Thompson–Boling Arena; Knoxville, Tennessee
SEC tournament
Mar 5, 1988	(2) No. 3	vs. (10) Kentucky; Quarterfinals	W 100–66	26–2	Albany Civic Center; Albany, Georgia
Mar 6, 1988	(2) No. 3	vs. (6) No. 17 Georgia; Semifinals	W 82–76	27–2	Albany Civic Center; Albany, Georgia
Mar 7, 1988	(2) No. 3	vs. (1) No. 1 Auburn; Championship game	W 73–70	28–2	Albany Civic Center; Albany, Georgia
NCAA tournament
Mar 19, 1988*	(1 E) No. 1	(9 E) Wake Forest; Second round	W 94–66	29–2	Thompson–Boling Arena; Knoxville, Tennessee
Mar 24, 1988	(1 E) No. 1	vs. (4 E) No. 14 James Madison; Regional Semifinal – Sweet Sixteen	W 72–52	30–2	Norfolk Scope; Norfolk, Virginia
Mar 25, 1988	(1 E) No. 1	vs. (2 E) No. 10 Virginia; Regional Final – Elite Eight	W 84–76	31–2	Norfolk Scope; Norfolk, Virginia
Apr 1, 1988	(1 E) No. 1	vs. (2 MW) No. 5 Louisiana Tech; National Semifinal – Final Four	L 59–68	31–3	Tacoma Dome (8,449); Tacoma, Washington
*Non-conference game. ^{#}Rankings from AP Poll. (#) Tournament seedings in parentheses. E=East.
