= 1988 Pacific Coast Athletic Association women's basketball tournament =

- Classification: Division I
- Teams: 8
- Site: The Forum; Inglewood, California
- Quarterfinals site: Campus sites Campus sites
- Champions: Long Beach State (2nd title)
- Winning coach: Joan Bonvicini (2nd title)
- MVP: Penny Toler (Long Beach State)

1987–88 Pacific Coast Athletic Association women's basketball standings
	Conf.				Overall
Team	W		L	PCT	W		L	PCT
No. 7 Long Beach State †	18	–	0	1.000	28	–	6	.824
UNLV	14	–	4	.778	25	–	9	.735
Cal State Fullerton	12	–	6	.667	18	–	11	.621
San Diego State	11	–	7	.611	21	–	10	.677
Fresno State	11	–	7	.611	16	–	12	.571
UC Irvine	9	–	9	.500	11	–	16	.407
Hawaii	8	–	10	.444	14	–	14	.500
Pacific	4	–	14	.222	9	–	19	.321
UC Santa Barbara	3	–	15	.167	10	–	16	.385
San Jose State	0	–	18	.000	1	–	26	.037
† 1988 PCAA tournament winner Rankings from AP Poll

The 1988 Pacific Coast Athletic Association women's basketball tournament took place March 10–12, 1988. The quarterfinal round was played at the home arena of the higher seed, while the semifinals and championship were held at The Forum in Inglewood, California. Long Beach State cruised to their second straight tournament title and received the conference's automatic bid to the 1988 NCAA Women's Division I Basketball Tournament. The 49ers would go on to reach the Final Four in back-to-back seasons.

== Format ==
The top eight teams, out of ten, from the regular season standings qualified for the tournament.

All eight participating teams were placed into the first round, with teams seeded and paired based on regular-season records. After the first round, teams were re-seeded so the highest-remaining team was paired with the lowest-remaining time in one semifinal with the other two teams slotted into the other semifinal.

== Bracket ==
Quarterfinals; Thursday, March 10
1	Long Beach State	77
8	Pacific	50
4	San Diego State	64
5	Fresno State	60
(Pairings are reseeded after the first round)
3	Cal State Fullerton	48
6	UC Irvine	47
2	UNLV	62
7	Hawaii	56

Semifinals (Re-Seeded); Friday, March 11
1	Long Beach State	94
4	San Diego State	78
3	Cal State Fullerton	55
2	UNLV	61

Championship game Saturday, March 12
1	Long Beach State	79
3	UNLV	58

== All-Tournament Team ==
- Wendy Anae, Cal State Fullerton
- Pauline Jordan, UNLV
- Angelique Lee, Long Beach State
- Chana Perry, San Diego State
- Penny Toler, Long Beach State (MVP)
- Traci Waites, Long Beach State
