= 1987–88 Louisiana Tech Lady Techsters basketball team =

1987-88 Louisiana Tech women's basketball season

1987–88 Louisiana Tech Lady Techsters basketball

NCAA tournament National Champions American South Tournament champions American South regular season champions Nugget Classic champions
- Conference: American South

Ranking
- Coaches: No. 1
- AP: No. 5
- Record: 32–2 (5–0 American South)
- Head coach: Leon Barmore (3rd season)
- Assistant coaches: Kim Mulkey; Jennifer White
- Home arena: Thomas Assembly Center

1987–88 American South women's basketball standings
| | Conf. | | | | Overall |
| Team | W | | L | PCT | W | | L | PCT |
|---|---|---|---|---|---|---|---|---|
| No. 5 Louisiana Tech † | 5 | – | 0 | 1.000 | 32 | – | 2 | .941 |
| New Orleans | 8 | – | 1 | .889 | 25 | – | 7 | .781 |
| Louisiana-Lafayette | 5 | – | 4 | .556 | 18 | – | 11 | .621 |
| Lamar | 4 | – | 5 | .444 | 14 | – | 14 | .500 |
| Arkansas State | 3 | – | 6 | .333 | 17 | – | 14 | .548 |
| UTPA | 0 | – | 9 | .000 | 0 | – | 27 | .000 |
† 1988 ASC Tournament winner Rankings from AP Poll

The 1987–88 Louisiana Tech Lady Techsters basketball team represented Louisiana Tech University during the 1987–88 NCAA Division I women's basketball season. The team was led by third–year head coach Leon Barmore, who led the team to a 32–2 record and the 1988 NCAA Division 1 championship. This was the program's third championship of the decade, following an NCAA championship in 1982 and an AIAW championship in 1981. The Lady Techsters played their home games at the Thomas Assembly Center in Ruston, Louisiana as a member of the American South Conference.

== Previous season ==
The Lady Techsters finished the 1986–87 season 30–3 as an independent. They received a bid to the 1987 NCAA Division I women's basketball tournament, where they advanced to the championship before falling 67–44 to Tennessee.

== Roster ==
1987–88 Louisiana Tech Lady Techsters women's basketball team
Players
Coaches

| Pos. | # | Name | Height | Year | Hometown |
|---|---|---|---|---|---|
| | 3 | Shelia Ethridge | 5 ft 8 in (1.73 m) | So | Ruston, Louisiana |
| | 4 | Lisa Harvey | 5 ft 7 in (1.7 m) | Jr | Benton Harbor, Michigan |
| | 11 | Teresa Weatherspoon | 5 ft 8 in (1.73 m) | Sr | Pineland, Texas |
| | 13 | Terri Meyer | 5 ft 8 in (1.73 m) | Fr | Levelland, Texas |
| | 14 | Angela Lawson | 5 ft 8 in (1.73 m) | Sr | Longview, Texas |
| | 15 | Melinda Chambless | 5 ft 5 in (1.65 m) | Sr | Chatham, Louisiana |
| | 22 | Phoebe Dunn | 5 ft 8 in (1.73 m) | So | Abernathy, Texas |
| | 23 | Tatia Brown | 5 ft 10 in (1.78 m) | Jr | Tulsa, Oklahoma |
| | 30 | Paulette Stall | 5 ft 10 in (1.78 m) | Jr | La Crosse, Wisconsin |
| | 33 | Beanie Lincoln | 6 ft 0 in (1.83 m) | Jr | Summerville, South Carolina |
| | 40 | Nora Lewis | 6 ft 0 in (1.83 m) | Jr | Peoria, Illinois |
| | 43 | Venus Lacy | 6 ft 4 in (1.93 m) | So | Chattanooga, Tennessee |
| | 44 | Erica Westbrooks | 6 ft 3 in (1.91 m) | Sr | Camden, Arkansas |
| | 50 | Jocelyn Watson | 6 ft 0 in (1.83 m) | So | McNeil, Arkansas |

Head coach

- Leon Barmore

Assistant coach(es)

- Mary Kay Hungate
- Kim Mulkey
- Jennifer White

Legend

- (C) Team captain
- (S) Suspended
- (I) Ineligible
- (W) Walk-on
- Injured
- Current redshirt

== Schedule and results ==
| Date time, TV | Rank^{#} | Opponent^{#} | Result | Record | Site (attendance) city, state |
Regular season
| November 27, 1987* | No. 5 | vs. Eastern Washington | W 107–57 | 1–0 | Hec Edmundson Pavilion (1,912); Seattle, WA |
| November 28, 1987* | No. 5 | at No. 16 Washington | W 70–60 | 2–0 | Hec Edmundson Pavilion (3,312); Seattle, WA |
| December 4, 1987* | No. 5 | at No. 11 Georgia | W 79–59 | 3–0 | Stegeman Coliseum (1,839); Athens, GA |
| December 7, 1987* | No. 4 | No. 19 UNLV | W 91–63 | 4–0 | Thomas Assembly Center (2,540); Ruston, LA |
| December 11, 1987 | No. 4 | Arkansas State; Lady Techsters Dial Classic | W 113–50 | 5–0 | Thomas Assembly Center (1,960); Ruston, LA |
| December 12, 1987* | No. 4 | Alcorn State; Lady Techsters Dial Classic | W 98–52 | 6–0 | Thomas Assembly Center (2,220); Ruston, LA |
| December 15, 1987* | No. 4 | UL-Monroe | W 81–50 | 7–0 | Thomas Assembly Center (3,575); Ruston, LA |
| December 17, 1987* | No. 4 | vs. Nicholls State; Wolf Pack Classic | W 92–42 | 8–0 | Lawlor Events Center (95); Reno, NV |
| December 18, 1987* | No. 4 | vs. Pepperdine; Wolf Pack Classic | W 72–61 | 9–0 | Lawlor Events Center (221); Reno, NV |
| December 19, 1987* | No. 4 | at Nevada; Wolf Pack Classic | W 80–46 | 10–0 | Lawlor Events Center (527); Reno, NV |
| January 4, 1988* | No. 3 | Kentucky | W 95–63 | 11–0 | Thomas Assembly Center (5,430); Ruston, LA |
| January 6, 1988* | No. 3 | Colorado | W 66–59 | 12–0 | Thomas Assembly Center (745); Ruston, LA |
| January 13, 1988* | No. 2 | Texas Tech | W 107–62 | 13–0 | Thomas Assembly Center (2,120); Ruston, LA |
| January 19, 1988* | No. 2 | Drake | W 88–56 | 14–0 | Thomas Assembly Center (1,935); Ruston, LA |
| January 23, 1988* | No. 2 | Utah | W 83–58 | 15–0 | Thomas Assembly Center (2,605); Ruston, LA |
| January 26, 1988* | No. 2 | at Oklahoma State | W 85–62 | 16–0 | Gallagher-Iba Arena (1,500); Stillwater, OK |
| January 28, 1988* | No. 2 | at Kansas State | W 77–45 | 17–0 | Ahearn Field House (448); Manhattan, KS |
| January 30, 1988 | No. 2 | Lamar | W 106–49 | 18–0 | Thomas Assembly Center (2,760); Ruston, LA |
| February 2, 1988 | No. 2 | UL-Lafayette | W 88–35 | 19–0 | Thomas Assembly Center (1,680); Ruston, LA |
| February 9, 1988* | No. 2 | at No. 17 Stephen F. Austin | W 69–51 | 20–0 | Johnson Coliseum (6,105); Nacogdoches, TX |
| February 12, 1988* | No. 2 | at Penn State | L 62–66 | 20–1 | Rec Hall (3,112); University Park, PA |
| February 15, 1988* | No. 5 | at No. 3 Tennessee | L 74–76 | 20–2 | Thompson–Boling Arena (7,106); Knoxville, TN |
| February 20, 1988* | No. 5 | at Old Dominion | W 68–66 | 21–2 | ODU Fieldhouse (2,512); Norfolk, VA |
| February 22, 1988 | No. 5 | UTPA | W 98–21 | 22–2 | Thomas Assembly Center (2,840); Ruston, LA |
| March 1, 1988* | No. 5 | at UL-Monroe | W 71–43 | 23–2 | Fant–Ewing Coliseum (3,862); Monroe, LA |
| March 3, 1988* | No. 5 | at Tulane | W 92–62 | 24–2 | Devlin Fieldhouse (350); New Orleans, LA |
| March 5, 1988 | No. 5 | at New Orleans | W 92–62 | 25–2 | Lakefront Arena (852); New Orleans, LA |
American South tournament
| March 11, 1988 | (1) | (4) Lamar | W 93–67 | 26–2 | Thomas Assembly Center (1,635); Ruston, LA |
| March 12, 1988 | (1) | (2) New Orleans | W 86–64 | 27–2 | Thomas Assembly Center (2,140); Ruston, LA |
NCAA tournament
| March 19, 1988 | (2 MW) | (7 MW) Kansas; Midwest Second Round | W 89–60 | 28–2 | Thomas Assembly Center (2,615); Ruston, LA |
| March 24, 1988 | (2 MW) | vs. (3 MW) Ole Miss; Midwest Semifinal | W 80–60 | 29–2 | Frank Erwin Center (8,074); Austin, TX |
| March 26, 1988 | (2 MW) | vs. (1 MW) Texas; Midwest Final | W 83–80 ^{OT} | 30–2 | Frank Erwin Center (12,288); Austin, TX |
| April 1, 1988 | (2 MW) | vs. (1 E) Tennessee; Final Four | W 68–59 | 31–2 | Tacoma Dome (8,449); Tacoma, WA |
| April 3, 1988 | (2 MW) No. 5 | vs. (1 ME) No. 3 Auburn; National Championship | W 56–54 | 32–2 | Tacoma Dome (8,448); Tacoma, WA |
*Non-conference game. ^{#}Rankings from AP Poll. (#) Tournament seedings in parentheses. All times are in Central.

== Awards and honors ==
- Wade Trophy winner (Teresa Weatherspoon)
- 1 Kodak All-American (Teresa Weatherspoon)
- 2 NCAA Final Four All-Tournament Team members (Teresa Weaterspoon, Erica Westbrooks)
- American South Conference Player of the Year (Teresa Weatherspoon)
- 2 American South All-Conference members (Nora Lewis, Teresa Weatherspoon)
- American South Conference Tournament MVP (Erica Westbrooks)
- 2 American South Conference All-Tournament members (Erica Westbrooks, Venus Lacy)
- Naismith Women's College Coach of the Year (Leon Barmore)
- American South Conference Coach of the Year (Leon Barmore)

== See also ==
- Louisiana Tech Lady Techsters basketball
