= 1987–88 Iowa Hawkeyes women's basketball team =

Intercollegiate basketball season

1987–88 Iowa Hawkeyes women's basketball

Big Ten Conference regular season champions Orange Bowl tournament champions

NCAA tournament, Elite Eight
- Conference: Big Ten Conference

Ranking
- Coaches: No. 6
- AP: No. 2
- Record: 29–2 (17–1 Big Ten)
- Head coach: C. Vivian Stringer (5th season)
- Home arena: Carver–Hawkeye Arena

1987–88 Big Ten women's basketball standings
	Conf.				Overall
Team	W		L	PCT	W		L	PCT
No. 2 Iowa	17	–	1	.944	29	–	2	.935
No. 6 Ohio State	16	–	2	.889	25	–	5	.833
Purdue	13	–	5	.722	21	–	10	.677
Michigan State	12	–	6	.667	16	–	12	.571
Northwestern	8	–	10	.444	13	–	14	.481
Michigan	7	–	11	.389	14	–	14	.500
Indiana	7	–	11	.389	12	–	16	.429
Minnesota	5	–	13	.278	9	–	18	.333
Illinois	3	–	15	.167	9	–	19	.321
Wisconsin	2	–	16	.111	4	–	24	.143
Rankings from AP Poll

The 1987–88 Iowa Hawkeyes women's basketball team represented the University of Iowa as members of the Big Ten Conference during the 1987–88 NCAA women's basketball season. The Hawkeyes, led by fifth-year head coach C. Vivian Stringer, played their home games in Iowa City, Iowa at Carver–Hawkeye Arena. They finished the season 29–2 overall, 17–1 in Big Ten play, winning the conference championship. The team finished with the highest final ranking of any Iowa Hawkeyes women's basketball team at No. 2 in the final AP poll. For the second straight season, Iowa advanced to the Elite Eight in the women's NCAA basketball tournament.

With big expectations entering the season, the Hawkeyes were ranked No. 6 in the preseason AP poll – the lowest ranking they would have all year. The team won its first 22 games, including victories over five top 10 teams, highlighted by takedowns of No. 2 Auburn and No. 1 Texas in the Orange Bowl tournament in Miami. The Hawkeyes themselves rose to the No. 1 ranking, a first ever for a Big Ten women's program, a perch they would hold onto for eight weeks. Iowa's lone regular season loss was a 58–54 setback at No. 8 Ohio State. The Hawkeyes finished the regular season 27–1 (17–1 Big Ten).

Ranked No. 2 in the final three AP polls, the Hawkeyes received the No. 1 seed in the West region of the NCAA tournament. Iowa defeated No. 8 seed, 19th ranked Stephen F. Austin and No. 4 seed, 15th ranked USC to reach the regional final. Iowa faced a team they defeated earlier in the season, No. 2 seed and 7th ranked Cal State Long Beach, but were beaten by 20 points in a virtual home game for the team from Long Beach.

Senior guard Michelle Edwards would be the first Iowa women's basketball player to have her number retired in 1990.

== Roster ==
1987–88 Iowa Hawkeyes women's basketball team
Players
Coaches

Pos.	#	Name	Height	Year	Previous school	Hometown
G	10	Stephanie Schueler	5 ft 6 in (1.68 m)	Fr	Lincoln	Sioux Falls, SD
F	12	Lorelei Watts	5 ft 10 in (1.78 m)	Sr	Alleman	Rock Island, IL
F	14	Felicia Hall	6 ft 2 in (1.88 m)	Fr	Green Oaks	Shreveport, LA
G	21	Robin Christian	5 ft 9 in (1.75 m)	Jr	Jamaica Plain	Roxbury, MA
F	22	Jolynn Schneider	6 ft 2 in (1.88 m)	Sr	Regina	Grosse Pointe, MI
F	25	Franthea Price	5 ft 9 in (1.75 m)	So	River Rouge	River Rouge, MI
G	30	Michelle Edwards	5 ft 9 in (1.75 m)	Sr	Cathedral	Boston, MA
G	32	Pam Williams	5 ft 9 in (1.75 m)	Sr	Lindblom Tech	Chicago, IL
F	33	Jody Ratigan	5 ft 8 in (1.73 m)	So	Tri-Center	Neola, IA
G	34	Jolette Law	5 ft 3 in (1.6 m)	So	Wilson	Florence, SC
C	42	Shanda Berry	6 ft 3 in (1.91 m)	Jr	Oelwein	Oelwein, IA
C	44	Marva Fuller	6 ft 5 in (1.96 m)	Sr	Holly	Holly, MI

Head coach

- C. Vivian Stringer

Assistant coach(es)

- Jennifer Bednarek
- Marianna Freeman

Legend

- (C) Team captain
- (S) Suspended
- (I) Ineligible
- (W) Walk-on
- Injured
- Current redshirt

Roster

== Schedule and results ==
Date time, TV	Rank^{#}	Opponent^{#}	Result	Record	Site city, state
Regular season
Nov 28, 1987*	No. 6	Missouri; Amana-Hawkeye Classic	W 85–71	1–0	Carver-Hawkeye Arena (1,588); Iowa City, Iowa
Nov 29, 1987*	No. 6	Georgia; Amana-Hawkeye Classic	W 66–56	2–0	Carver-Hawkeye Arena (2,097); Iowa City, Iowa
Dec 1, 1987*	No. 6	at Iowa State	W 93–49	3–0	Hilton Coliseum; Ames, Iowa
Dec 5, 1987*	No. 6	vs. No. 4 Long Beach State; NIU Fastbreak Festival	W 82–75	4–0	Evans Field House; DeKalb, Illinois
Dec 6, 1987*	No. 6	at Northern Illinois; NIU Fastbreak Festival	W 81–73	5–0	Evans Field House; DeKalb, Illinois
Dec 11, 1987*	No. 5	Nebraska	W 68–58	6–0	Carver-Hawkeye Arena; Iowa City, Iowa
Dec 28, 1987*	No. 5	vs. No. 2 Auburn; Burger King/Orange Bowl Tournament	W 73–69	7–0	James L. Knight International Center; Miami, Florida
Dec 29, 1987*	No. 5	vs. No. 6 Virginia; Burger King/Orange Bowl Tournament	W 75–59	8–0	James L. Knight International Center; Miami, Florida
Dec 30, 1987*	No. 5	vs. No. 1 Texas; Burger King/Orange Bowl Tournament	W 75–65	9–0	James L. Knight International Center; Miami, Florida
Jan 8, 1988	No. 1	at Wisconsin	W 81–71	10–0 (1–0)	Wisconsin Field House; Madison, Wisconsin
Jan 10, 1988	No. 1	at Northwestern	W 81–43	11–0 (2–0)	Carver-Hawkeye Arena; Iowa City, Iowa
Jan 15, 1988	No. 1	at Minnesota	W 84–41	12–0 (3–0)	Williams Arena; Minneapolis, Minnesota
Jan 22, 1988	No. 1	at Illinois	W 90–63	13–0 (4–0)	Assembly Hall; Champaign, Illinois
Jan 9, 1988	No. 1	at Purdue	W 67–57	14–0 (5–0)	Mackey Arena; West Lafayette, Indiana
Jan 29, 1988	No. 1	Indiana	W 72–48	15–0 (6–0)	Carver-Hawkeye Arena; Iowa City, Iowa
Jan 31, 1988	No. 1	No. 8 Ohio State	W 75–64	16–0 (7–0)	Carver-Hawkeye Arena; Iowa City, Iowa
Feb 2, 1988	No. 1	at Michigan State	W 77–52	17–0 (8–0)	Jenison Fieldhouse; East Lansing, Michigan
Feb 5, 1988	No. 1	at Michigan	W 89–54	18–0 (9–0)	Crisler Arena; Ann Arbor, Michigan
Feb 12, 1988	No. 1	Minnesota	W 100–51	19–0 (10–0)	Carver-Hawkeye Arena; Iowa City, Iowa
Feb 16, 1988*	No. 1	Drake	W 74–38	20–0	Carver-Hawkeye Arena; Iowa City, Iowa
Feb 19, 1988	No. 1	Purdue	W 66–52	21–0 (11–0)	Carver-Hawkeye Arena; Iowa City, Iowa
Feb 21, 1988	No. 1	Illinois	W 87–36	22–0 (12–0)	Carver-Hawkeye Arena; Iowa City, Iowa
Feb 26, 1988	No. 1	at No. 8 Ohio State	L 54–58	22–1 (12–1)	St. John Arena; Columbus, Ohio
Feb 28, 1988	No. 1	at Indiana	W 71–47	23–1 (13–1)	Assembly Hall; Bloomington, Indiana
Mar 4, 1988	No. 2	Michigan	W 76–55	24–1 (14–1)	Carver-Hawkeye Arena; Iowa City, Iowa
Mar 6, 1988	No. 2	Michigan State	W 52–46	25–1 (15–1)	Carver-Hawkeye Arena; Iowa City, Iowa
Mar 10, 1988	No. 2	at Northwestern	W 76–66	26–1 (16–1)	Welsh-Ryan Arena; Evanston, Illinois
Mar 12, 1988	No. 2	Wisconsin	W 98–50	27–1 (17–1)	Carver-Hawkeye Arena; Iowa City, Iowa
NCAA tournament
Mar 18, 1988*	(1 W) No. 2	(8 W) No. 19 Stephen F. Austin; Second round	W 83–65	28–1	Carver-Hawkeye Arena; Iowa City, Iowa
Mar 24, 1988*	(1 W) No. 2	vs. (4 W) No. 15 USC; West Regional Semifinal – Sweet Sixteen	W 79–67	29–1	Long Beach Arena; Long Beach, California
Mar 26, 1988*	(1 W) No. 2	at (2 W) No. 7 Long Beach State; West Regional Final – Elite Eight	L 78–98	29–2	Long Beach Arena (2,179); Long Beach, California
*Non-conference game. ^{#}Rankings from AP Poll. (#) Tournament seedings in parentheses. W=West.

== Rankings ==
Ranking movements Legend: ██ Increase in ranking ██ Decrease in ranking
	Week																	
Poll	Pre	1	2	3	4	5	6	7	8	9	10	11	12	13	14	15	16	Final
AP	6	6	5	5	5	5	1	1	1	1	1	1	1	1	2	2	2	Not released
Coaches	7	6	5	5	5	5	1	1	1	1	1	1	1	1	3	3	3	6
