= 1987–88 Auburn Tigers women's basketball team =

Intercollegiate basketball season

1987–88 Auburn Tigers women's basketball

SEC regular season champions Lady Sunshine Classic champions Long Beach Dial Classic champions

NCAA tournament, Runner-up
- Conference: Southeastern Conference

Ranking
- Coaches: No. 2
- AP: No. 3
- Record: 32–3 (9–0 SEC)
- Head coach: Joe Ciampi (9th season)
- Assistant coach: Carol Ross
- Home arena: Joel H. Eaves Memorial Coliseum

1987–88 SEC women's basketball standings
	Conf.				Overall
Team	W		L	PCT	W		L	PCT
No. 3 Auburn	9	–	0	1.000	32	–	3	.914
No. 1 Tennessee^{†}	8	–	1	.889	31	–	3	.912
LSU	6	–	3	.667	18	–	11	.621
No. 12 Ole Miss	5	–	4	.556	24	–	7	.774
No. 17 Georgia	5	–	4	.556	21	–	10	.677
Alabama	5	–	4	.556	18	–	10	.643
Vanderbilt	4	–	5	.444	18	–	10	.643
Mississippi State	2	–	7	.222	19	–	13	.594
Florida	1	–	8	.111	9	–	18	.333
Kentucky	0	–	9	.000	14	–	15	.483
† 1988 SEC tournament winner Rankings from AP poll

The 1987–88 Auburn Tigers women's basketball team represented Auburn University during the [1987–88 NCAA Division I women's basketball season. The Tigers, led by ninth-year head coach Joe Ciampi, played their home games at Joel H. Eaves Memorial Coliseum as members of the Southeastern Conference. They finished the season 32–3, 9–0 in SEC play to win the conference regular season title. Ranked No. 1, they lost to Tennessee in championship game of the SEC women's tournament. Auburn finished the regular season ranked No. 3 and was selected as the No. 1 seed in the Mideast regional of the NCAA tournament. They defeated Penn State, Georgia, and Maryland to reach the first Final Four in program history. The Lady Tigers then defeated No. 2 seed in the Midwest region, Long Beach State, to reach the National championship game where Auburn was defeated by Louisiana Tech, 56–54.

This season marked the first of three straight National runner-up finishes for the Auburn women's basketball program.

== Roster ==
1987–88 Auburn Tigers women's basketball team
Players
Coaches

Pos.	#	Name	Height	Year	Previous school	Hometown
G	10	Chantel Tremitiere	5 ft 6 in (1.68 m)	Fr	William Penn	York, PA
G	11	MaeOla Bolton	5 ft 11 in (1.8 m)	Sr	McClain	McLain, MS
G	25	Ruthie Bolton	5 ft 8 in (1.73 m)	Jr	McClain	McLain, MS
F/C	30	Sharon Stewart	6 ft 3 in (1.91 m)	Sr	Hazlehurst	Hazlehurst, MS
F	34	Jocelyn McGilberry	6 ft 0 in (1.83 m)	Jr	South Jones	Ellisville, MS
F	44	Lotta Frenssen	6 ft 3 in (1.91 m)	Fr	Sandagymnasiet	Stockholm, Sweden
C	45	Linda Godby	6 ft 5 in (1.96 m)	So	Warren Central	Indianapolis, IN
C	50	Vickie Orr	6 ft 2 in (1.88 m)	Jr	Hartselle	Decatur, AL

Head coach

- Joe Ciampi (Mansfield State)

Assistant coach(es)

Legend

- (C) Team captain
- (S) Suspended
- (I) Ineligible
- (W) Walk-on
- Injured
- Current redshirt

Roster

== Schedule ==
Date time, TV	Rank^{#}	Opponent^{#}	Result	Record	Site (attendance) city, state
Regular season
Nov 27, 1987*	No. 3	vs. Providence; Lady Sunshine Classic	W 107–69	1–0	Orlando, Florida
Nov 28, 1987*	No. 3	vs. South Carolina; Lady Sunshine Classic	W 88–52	2–0	Orlando, Florida
Nov 30, 1987	No. 3	Monmouth	W 80–48	3–0	Eaves Memorial Coliseum; Auburn, Alabama
Dec 5, 1987	No. 3	Georgia State	W 110–52	4–0	Eaves Memorial Coliseum; Auburn, Alabama
Dec 11, 1987*	No. 3	vs. No. 18 USC; Long Beach Dial Classic	W 85–57	5–0	Long Beach Arena; Long Beach, California
Dec 12, 1987*	No. 3	at No. 7 Long Beach State; Long Beach Dial Classic	W 87–76	6–0	Long Beach Arena; Long Beach, California
Dec 15, 1987*	No. 2	at UCLA	W 76–52	7–0	Pauley Pavilion; Los Angeles, California
Dec 19, 1987*	No. 2	at Alabama State	W 95–73	8–0	Lockhart Gym; Montgomery, Alabama
Dec 28, 1987*	No. 2	vs. No. 5 Iowa; Burger King/Orange Bowl Tournament	L 69–73	8–1	James L. Knight International Center; Miami, Florida
Dec 29, 1987*	No. 2	at Miami (FL); Burger King/Orange Bowl Tournament	W 96–48	9–1	James L. Knight International Center; Miami, Florida
Dec 30, 1987*	No. 2	vs. No. 16 Maryland; Burger King/Orange Bowl Tournament	W 75–57	10–1	James L. Knight International Center; Miami, Florida
Jan 6, 1988*	No. 2	Tuskegee	W 105–44	11–1	Eaves Memorial Coliseum; Auburn, Alabama
Jan 9, 1988	No. 2	at No. 4 Tennessee	W 71–68	12–1 (1–0)	Thompson–Boling Arena; Knoxville, Tennessee
Jan 13, 1988*	No. 3	Detroit	W 106–44	13–1	Eaves Memorial Coliseum; Auburn, Alabama
Jan 16, 1988	No. 3	at Mississippi State	W 76–65	14–1 (2–0)	Humphrey Coliseum; Starkville, Mississippi
Jan 20, 1988*	No. 3	Chattanooga	W 96–62	15–1	Eaves Memorial Coliseum; Auburn, Alabama
Jan 23, 1988*	No. 3	at New Orleans	W 73–54	16–1	Lakefront Arena; New Orleans, Louisiana
Jan 27, 1988	No. 3	at Alabama	W 88–57	17–1 (3–0)	Coleman Coliseum; Tuscaloosa, Alabama
Jan 30, 1988	No. 3	No. 7 Ole Miss	W 71–70	18–1 (4–0)	Eaves Memorial Coliseum; Auburn, Alabama
Feb 3, 1988	No. 3	LSU	W 78–47	19–1 (5–0)	Eaves Memorial Coliseum; Auburn, Alabama
Feb 6, 1988	No. 3	Florida	W 75–42	20–1 (6–0)	Eaves Memorial Coliseum; Auburn, Alabama
Feb 10, 1988	No. 3	No. 13 Georgia	W 89–70	21–1 (7–0)	Eaves Memorial Coliseum; Auburn, Alabama
Feb 14, 1988	No. 3	Kentucky	W 93–57	22–1 (8–0)	Eaves Memorial Coliseum; Auburn, Alabama
Feb 18, 1988*	No. 2	at Syracuse	W 87–70	23–1	Manley Field House; Syracuse, New York
Feb 20, 1988*	No. 2	at Wilkes College	W 107–35	24–1	Wilkes-Barre, Pennsylvania
Feb 22, 1988*	No. 2	at South Alabama	W 68–55	25–1	Mobile, Alabama
Feb 28, 1988	No. 2	at Vanderbilt	W 89–57	26–1 (9–0)	Memorial Gymnasium; Nashville, Tennessee
SEC Tournament
March 5, 1988	(1) No. 1	(8) Mississippi State; Quarterfinals	W 78–48	27–1	Albany Civic Center; Albany, Georgia
March 6, 1988	(1) No. 1	(5) No. 12 Ole Miss; Semifinals	W 69–60	28–1	Albany Civic Center; Albany, Georgia
March 7, 1988	(1) No. 1	(2) No. 3 Tennessee; Championship game	L 70–73	28–2	Albany Civic Center; Albany, Georgia
NCAA Tournament
March 19, 1988	(1 ME) No. 3	(9 ME) Penn State; Second round	W 94–66	29–2	Eaves Memorial Coliseum; Auburn, Alabama
March 24, 1988	(1 ME) No. 3	at (4 ME) No. 17 Georgia; Regional Semifinal – Sweet Sixteen	W 68–65	30–2	Stegeman Coliseum; Athens, Georgia
March 26, 1988	(1 ME) No. 3	vs. (2 ME) No. 9 Maryland; Regional Final – Elite Eight	W 103–74	31–2	Stegeman Coliseum; Athens, Georgia
April 1, 1988	(1 ME) No. 3	vs. (2 W) No. 7 Long Beach State; National semifinal – Final Four	W 68–55	32–2	Tacoma Dome (8,449); Tacoma, Washington
April 3, 1988	(1 ME) No. 3	vs. (2 MW) No. 5 Louisiana Tech; National Championship	L 54–56	32–3	Tacoma Dome (8,448); Tacoma, Washington
*Non-conference game. ^{#}Rankings from AP Poll. (#) Tournament seedings in parentheses. All times are in Central Time.

== Awards and honors ==
- Vickie Orr – SEC Player of the Year, First-team All-American
- Joe Ciampi – SEC Coach of the Year
