= West Sabine Independent School District =

School district in Texas

West Sabine Independent School District is a public school district based in Pineland, Texas (USA) that serves western Sabine County. The district was formed in 1962 by the consolidation of Bronson and Pineland school districts.

In 2009, the school district was rated "academically acceptable" by the Texas Education Agency.

== Schools ==
- West Sabine High School (Grades 6–12)
- West Sabine Elementary School (Grades PK-5)
