= 1987–88 Long Beach State 49ers women's basketball team =

American college basketball season

1987–88 Long Beach State Beach women's basketball

PCAA champions

NCAA tournament, Final Four
- Conference: Pacific Coast Athletic Association

Ranking
- Coaches: No. 4
- AP: No. 7
- Record: 28–6 (18–0 PCAA)
- Head coach: Joan Bonvicini (9th season)
- Home arena: Gold Mine

1987–88 Pacific Coast Athletic Association women's basketball standings
	Conf.				Overall
Team	W		L	PCT	W		L	PCT
No. 7 Long Beach State †	18	–	0	1.000	28	–	6	.824
UNLV	14	–	4	.778	25	–	9	.735
Cal State Fullerton	12	–	6	.667	18	–	11	.621
San Diego State	11	–	7	.611	21	–	10	.677
Fresno State	11	–	7	.611	16	–	12	.571
UC Irvine	9	–	9	.500	11	–	16	.407
Hawaii	8	–	10	.444	14	–	14	.500
Pacific	4	–	14	.222	9	–	19	.321
UC Santa Barbara	3	–	15	.167	10	–	16	.385
San Jose State	0	–	18	.000	1	–	26	.037
† 1988 PCAA tournament winner Rankings from AP Poll

The 1987–88 Long Beach State 49ers women's basketball team represented California State University, Long Beach during the 1987–88 NCAA Division I women's basketball season. The Beach, led by ninth-year head coach Joan Bonvicini, played their home games at the Gold Mine in Long Beach, California as members of the Pacific Coast Athletic Association.

== Roster ==
1987–88 Long Beach State 49ers women's basketball team
Players
Coaches

Pos.	#	Name	Height	Year	Previous school	Hometown
G	11	Penny Toler	5 ft 8 in (1.73 m)	Jr	St. Anthony; San Diego State	Washington, D.C.
F/C	21	Shannon Smith	6 ft 3 in (1.91 m)	So
C		Angelique Lee	6 ft 4 in (1.93 m)	So
F		Shameil Coleman	5 ft 11 in (1.8 m)	Jr
F		Cheryl Dowell	6 ft 1 in (1.85 m)	Jr
G		Traci Waites	5 ft 8 in (1.73 m)	Jr
G		Dana Wilkerson	5 ft 6 in (1.68 m)	Fr
		Carol Brandt	—	Sr
F		Lisa Reslock	6 ft 1 in (1.85 m)	Fr
F		Tonya Swoffer	6 ft 2 in (1.88 m)	Fr
G		Tammy Joy	5 ft 10 in (1.78 m)	Fr
F		Bettina Turner	6 ft 0 in (1.83 m)	Jr
C		Vicki Pullins	6 ft 4 in (1.93 m)	Fr

Head coach

- Joan Bonvicini

Assistant coach(es)

Legend

- (C) Team captain
- (S) Suspended
- (I) Ineligible
- (W) Walk-on
- Injured
- Current redshirt

Roster

== Schedule and results ==
Date time, TV	Rank^{#}	Opponent^{#}	Result	Record	Site (attendance) city, state
Regular season
Dec 3, 1987*	No. 4	UCLA	W 103–57	1–0	Gold Mine; Long Beach, California
Dec 5, 1987*	No. 4	vs. No. 6 Iowa; NIU Fastbreak Festival	L 75–82	1–1	Evans Field House; DeKalb, Illinois
Dec 6, 1987*	No. 4	vs. UNC Charlotte; NIU Fastbreak Festival	W 94–56	2–1	Evans Field House; DeKalb, Illinois
Dec 11, 1987*	No. 7	Toledo; Long Beach Dial Classic	W 95–53	3–1	Long Beach Arena; Long Beach, California
Dec 12, 1987*	No. 7	No. 3 Auburn; Long Beach Dial Classic	L 76–87	3–2	Long Beach Arena; Long Beach, California
Dec 18, 1987*	No. 9	No. 1 Texas	L 85–99	3–3	Frank Erwin Center; Austin, Texas
Jan 2, 1988		at UC Irvine	W 91–68	4–3 (1–0)	Bren Events Center; Irvine, California
Jan 4, 1988		at UC Santa Barbara	W 70–44	5–3 (2–0)	UC Santa Barbara Events Center; Santa Barbara, California
Jan 7, 1988		San Jose State	W 96–33	6–3 (3–0)	Gold Mine; Long Beach, California
Jan 9, 1988		Fresno State	W 72–56	7–3 (4–0)	Gold Mine; Long Beach, California
Jan 16, 1988		at UNLV	W 100–74	8–3 (5–0)	Thomas & Mack Center; Paradise, Nevada
Jan 20, 1988*		at Georgia	L 64–74	8–4	Stegeman Coliseum; Athens, Georgia
Jan 22, 1988*		at Old Dominion	L 76–85	8–5	ODU Fieldhouse; Norfolk, Virginia
Jan 28, 1988		Pacific	W 106–52	9–5 (6–0)	Gold Mine; Long Beach, California
Jan 30, 1988		at Cal State Fullerton	W 83–48	10–5 (7–0)	Titan Gym; Fullerton, California
Feb 4, 1988		at Fresno State	W 79–64	11–5 (8–0)	Selland Arena; Fresno, California
Feb 6, 1988		at San Jose State	W 82–51	12–5 (9–0)	Spartan Gym; San Jose, California
Feb 11, 1988		UC Irvine	W 101–41	13–5 (10–0)	Gold Mine; Long Beach, California
Feb 13, 1988		UNLV	W 82–78	14–5 (11–0)	Gold Mine; Long Beach, California
Feb 16, 1988*		at USC	W 82–78	15–5	Los Angeles Memorial Sports Arena; Los Angeles, California
Feb 18, 1988		San Diego State	W 96–76	16–5 (12–0)	Gold Mine; Long Beach, California
Feb 20, 1988		Cal State Fullerton	W 80–43	17–5 (13–0)	Gold Mine; Long Beach, California
Feb 25, 1988		Hawaii	W 77–65	18–5 (14–0)	Gold Mine; Long Beach, California
Feb 27, 1988		at Pacific	W 98–57	19–5 (15–0)	Alex G. Spanos Center; Stockton, California
Mar 1, 1988		at San Diego State	W 90–65	20–5 (16–0)	Peterson Gym; San Diego, California
Mar 3, 1988		UC Santa Barbara	W 91–64	21–5 (17–0)	Gold Mine; Long Beach, California
Mar 5, 1988		Hawaii	W 108–77	22–5 (18–0)	Gold Mine; Long Beach, California
PCAA tournament
Mar 10, 1988*	(1) No. 7	Pacific; Quarterfinals	W 77–50	23–5	Gold Mine; Long Beach, California
Mar 11, 1988*	(1) No. 7	vs. San Diego State; Semifinals	W 94–78	24–5	The Forum; Inglewood, California
Mar 12, 1988*	(1) No. 7	vs. UNLV; Championship game	W 79–58	25–5	The Forum; Inglewood, California
NCAA tournament
Mar 20, 1988*	(2 W) No. 7	(7 W) Colorado; Second round	W 103–64	26–5	Gold Mine; Long Beach, California
Mar 24, 1988*	(2 W) No. 7	(3 W) No. 11 Washington; Regional Semifinal – Sweet Sixteen	W 104–78	27–5	Long Beach Arena; Long Beach, California
Mar 26, 1988*	(2 W) No. 7	(1 W) No. 2 Iowa; Regional Final – Elite Eight	W 98–78	28–5	Long Beach Arena (2,179); Long Beach, California
April 1, 1988	(2 W) No. 7	vs. (1 ME) No. 3 Auburn; National semifinal – Final Four	L 55–68	28–6	Tacoma Dome (8,449); Tacoma, Washington
*Non-conference game. ^{#}Rankings from AP Poll. (#) Tournament seedings in parentheses. All times are in Pacific.

== Rankings ==
Ranking movements Legend: ██ Increase in ranking ██ Decrease in ranking
	Week																	
Poll	1	2	3	4	5	6	7	8	9	10	11	12	13	14	15	16	17	Final
AP	4	4	7	9	11	11	12	12	9	9	14	14	12	12	10	8	7	Not released
Coaches	4	4	8	12	13	12	12	12	8	16	14	14	12	12	11	8	9	4
