= West Sabine High School =

Location
- 109 Timberland Hwy; Pineland, Texas 75968-0869; United States; 31.2156°N 93.9739°W

Information
- School type: Public high school
- Established: 1961
- School district: West Sabine Independent School District
- Principal: Ryan Fuller
- Grades: 6-12
- Enrollment: 293 (2023–24)
- Colors: Orange, Black & White
- Athletics conference: UIL Class AA
- Mascot: Tigers
- Yearbook: Aurora
- Website: West Sabine High School

West Sabine High School is a public high school located in Pineland, Texas (USA) and classified as a 2A school by the UIL. It is part of the West Sabine Independent School District located in western Sabine County. West Sabine High School was formed in 1961 by the consolidation of Bronson and Pineland High Schools. In 2015, the school was rated "Met Standard" by the Texas Education Agency.

== Athletics ==
The West Sabine Tigers compete in these sports -

- Baseball
- Basketball
- Cross Country
- Football
- Golf
- Softball
- Track and Field

=== State Titles ===
- Boys Basketball -
  - 1963(1A), 1965(1A)

==== State Finalists ====
- Baseball -
  - 1982(1A), 1994(1A)
- Boys Basketball -
  - 1968(1A)

== Notable alumni ==
- Teresa Weatherspoon (class of 1984), basketball player and coach
