= 1988 SEC women's basketball tournament =

- Classification: Division I
- Teams: 10
- Site: Albany Civic Center; Albany, GA
- Champions: Tennessee (3rd title)
- Winning coach: Pat Summit (3rd title)
- MVP: Bridgette Gordon (Tennessee)
- Attendance: 19,512

The 1988 Southeastern Conference women's basketball tournament was the postseason women's basketball tournament for the Southeastern Conference (SEC) held at the Albany Civic Center in Albany, GA, from March 4 – March 7, 1988. The Tennessee Lady Vols won the tournament and earned an automatic bid to the 1988 NCAA Division I women's basketball tournament.

== Seeds ==
All teams in the conference participated in the tournament. Teams were seeded by their conference record.

Seed	School	Conf. Record	Overall record	Tiebreaker
1	Auburn^{‡†}	9–0	32–3	
2	Tennessee^{†}	8–1	31–3	
3	LSU^{†}	6–3	18–11	
4	Alabama^{†}	5–4	18–10	
5	Ole Miss^{†}	5–4	24–7	
6	Georgia^{†}	5–4	21–10	
7	Vanderbilt	4–5	18–10	
8	Mississippi State	2–7	19–13	
9	Florida	1–8	9–18	
10	Kentucky	0–9	14–15	
‡ – SEC regular season champions, and tournament No. 1 seed. † – Received a bye in the conference tournament. Overall records include all games played in the SEC Tournament.

== Schedule ==
Game	Matchup^{#}	Score
First Round – Fri, Mar 4
1	No. 7 Vanderbilt vs. No. 10 Kentucky	67–75
2	No. 8 Mississippi State vs. No. 9 Florida	67–46
Quarterfinals – Sat, Mar 5
3	No. 1 Auburn vs. No. 8 Mississippi State	69–48
5	No. 2 Tennessee vs. No. 10 Kentucky	100–66
4	No. 3 LSU vs. No. 6 Georgia	84–86
6	No. 4 Alabama vs. No. 5 Ole Miss	66–76
Semifinals – Sun, Mar 6
7	No. 1 Auburn vs. No. 5 Ole Miss	69–60
8	No. 2 Tennessee vs. No. 6 Georgia	82–76
Finals – Mon, Mar 7
9	No. 1 Auburn vs. No. 2 Tennessee	70–73
# – Rankings denote tournament seed

== Bracket ==
First round Fri, Mar 4
8	Mississippi State	67
9	Florida	46
7	Vanderbilt	67
10	Kentucky	75

Quarterfinals; Sat, Mar 5
1	Auburn	69
8	Mississippi State	48
4	Alabama	66
5	Ole Miss	76
2	Tennessee	100
10	Kentucky	66
3	LSU	84
6	Georgia	86

Semifinals; Sun, Mar 6
1	Auburn	69
5	Ole Miss	60
2	Tennessee	82
6	Georgia	76

Championship; Mon, Mar 7
1	Auburn	70
2	Tennessee	73
