= Pineland, Texas =

City in Sabine County, Texas, United States

- City
- Seal

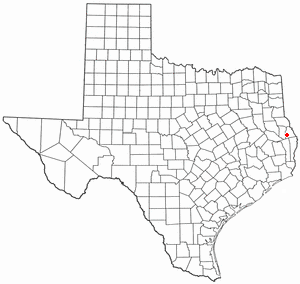
- Location of Pineland, Texas

- Coordinates: 31°14′58″N 93°58′30″W
- Country: United States
- State: Texas
- County: Sabine

Area
  - Total: 2.11 sq mi (5.46 km^{2})
  - Land: 2.05 sq mi (5.30 km^{2})
  - Water: 0.062 sq mi (0.16 km^{2})
- Elevation: 262 ft (80 m)

Population (2020)
  - Total: 888
  - Density: 391.0/sq mi (150.95/km^{2})
- Time zone: UTC-6 (Central (CST))
  - Summer (DST): UTC-5 (CDT)
- ZIP code: 75968
- Area code: 409
- FIPS code: 48-57644
- GNIS feature ID: 2411426
- Website: https://pinelandtx.gov/

Pineland is a city in Sabine County, Texas, United States. The population was 888 at the 2020 census.

== Geography ==
According to the United States Census Bureau, the city has a total area of 2.1 square miles (5.4 km^{2}), of which 2.0 square miles (5.2 km^{2}) is land and 0.1 square miles (0.26 km^{2}) (4.37%) is water.

=== Climate ===
The climate in this area is characterized by hot, humid summers and generally mild to cool winters. According to the Köppen Climate Classification system, Pineland has a humid subtropical climate, abbreviated "Cfa" on climate maps.

== Historical development ==
The site was first established in 1902 as the Gulf, Beaumont and Great Northern Railway was built through the county, as this was a lumber camp. In 1904, a post office was opened and three years later, a sawmill would begin operation under the Garrison Norton Lumber Company. After running there for three years, Thomas L. L. Temple (who was part owner of the mill) bought out the interest of the other owners, and established the Temple Lumber Company. The residents of the town voted in 1941 to become incorporated.

== Demographics ==
Historical population
Census	Pop.	Note	%±
1950	1,454		—
1960	1,236		−15.0%
1970	1,127		−8.8%
1980	1,111		−1.4%
1990	882		−20.6%
2000	980		11.1%
2010	850		−13.3%
2020	888		4.5%
U.S. Decennial Census

=== 2020 census ===
As of the 2020 census, Pineland had a population of 888. The median age was 37.0 years. 27.8% of residents were under the age of 18 and 16.6% of residents were 65 years of age or older. For every 100 females there were 95.2 males, and for every 100 females age 18 and over there were 91.3 males age 18 and over.

0.0% of residents lived in urban areas, while 100.0% lived in rural areas.

There were 336 households in Pineland, of which 36.6% had children under the age of 18 living in them. Of all households, 39.9% were married-couple households, 20.5% were households with a male householder and no spouse or partner present, and 33.6% were households with a female householder and no spouse or partner present. About 27.7% of all households were made up of individuals and 11.0% had someone living alone who was 65 years of age or older.

There were 401 housing units, of which 16.2% were vacant. The homeowner vacancy rate was 2.4% and the rental vacancy rate was 12.3%.

Racial composition as of the 2020 census
Race	Number	Percent
White	574	64.6%
Black or African American	234	26.4%
American Indian and Alaska Native	1	0.1%
Asian	1	0.1%
Native Hawaiian and Other Pacific Islander	0	0.0%
Some other race	15	1.7%
Two or more races	63	7.1%
Hispanic or Latino (of any race)	52	5.9%

=== 2000 census ===
As of the census of 2000, there were 980 people, 371 households, and 260 families residing in the city. The population density was 497.5 inhabitants per square mile (192.1/km^{2}). There were 447 housing units at an average density of 226.9 per square mile (87.6/km^{2}). The racial makeup of the city was 69.90% White, 25.61% African American, 0.82% Native American, 0.20% Asian, 1.43% from other races, and 2.04% from two or more races. Hispanic or Latino of any race were 3.47% of the population.

There were 371 households, out of which 32.6% had children under the age of 18 living with them, 46.1% were married couples living together, 20.8% had a female householder with no husband present, and 29.9% were non-families. 27.5% of all households were made up of individuals, and 14.0% had someone living alone who was 65 years of age or older. The average household size was 2.49 and the average family size was 3.04.

In the city, the population was spread out, with 26.4% under the age of 18, 7.0% from 18 to 24, 28.1% from 25 to 44, 19.1% from 45 to 64, and 19.4% who were 65 years of age or older. The median age was 36 years. For every 100 females, there were 94.1 males. For every 100 females age 18 and over, there were 82.1 males.

The median income for a household in the city was $27,563, and the median income for a family was $33,250. Males had a median income of $30,300 versus $22,159 for females. The per capita income for the city was $18,043. About 16.7% of families and 19.5% of the population were below the poverty line, including 27.9% of those under age 18 and 12.0% of those age 65 or over.

== Education ==
The City of Pineland is served by the West Sabine Independent School District and home to the West Sabine High School Tigers.

== Notable people ==
- Teresa Weatherspoon, head coach for Vinyl basketball club

== See also ==
- List of municipalities in Texas
