= Angela Lawson =

American basketball player and coach

Current position
- Title: Senior associate director of athletics
- Team: Incarnate Word

Biographical details
- Born: January 19, 1966 (age 60)

Playing career
- 1984–1988: Louisiana Tech

Coaching career (HC unless noted)
- 1989–1991: Tennessee (GA)
- 1991–1994: Texas State (asst.)
- 1994–2000: Baylor (asst.)
- 2000–2013: Incarnate Word

Accomplishments and honors

Championships
- 2× NCAA Division I Champion (1988, 1991); Heartland Conference Tournament Champion (2009)

Angela Lawson (born January 19, 1966) is the senior associate director of athletics at the University of the Incarnate Word. She played college basketball at Louisiana Tech University where she was a three-year starter for Leon Barmore and the Lady Techsters and won the 1988 NCAA Division I National Championship in her senior season. Lawson went to the University of Tennessee to earn a master's degree and serve as a graduate assistant for Pat Summitt and the Lady Vols. In her second season as GA, Tennessee won the 1991 NCAA Division I National Championship. Lawson then took an assistant coaching position at Texas State, which she served for 3 seasons. Then she took an assistant coaching position at Baylor with former Louisiana Tech coach Sonja Hogg. After serving 6 years at Baylor, Lawson took the head coaching position which at the University of the Incarnate Word until 2013.

== Career statistics ==
Legend
GP	Games played	GS	Games started	MPG	Minutes per game	RPG	Rebounds per game
APG	Assists per game	SPG	Steals per game	BPG	Blocks per game	PPG	Points per game
TO	Turnovers per game	FG%	Field-goal percentage	3P%	3-point field-goal percentage	FT%	Free-throw percentage
**Bold**	Career best	°	League leader

=== College ===
Year	Team	GP	GS	MPG	FG%	3P%	FT%	RPG	APG	SPG	BPG	TO	PPG
1987–88	Louisiana Tech	33	-	-	42.5	28.0	57.7	3.6	3.9	1.2	0.1	-	11.2
**Career**		33	-	-	42.5	28.0	57.7	3.6	3.9	1.2	0.1	-	11.2
Statistics retrieved from Sports-Reference.
