= 1987–88 NCAA Division I women's basketball rankings =

- Season: 1987–88
- NCAA Tournament: 1988
- Preseason No. 1: Tennessee
- NCAA Tournament Champions: Louisiana Tech
NCAA Division I women's basketball rankings


Two human polls comprise the 1987–88 NCAA Division I women's basketball rankings, the AP Poll and the Coaches Poll, in addition to various publications' preseason polls. The AP poll is currently a poll of sportswriters, while the USA Today Coaches' Poll is a poll of college coaches. The AP conducts polls weekly through the end of the regular season and conference play, while the Coaches poll conducts a final, post-NCAA tournament poll as well.

== Legend ==
–	Not ranked
(#)	Ranking

== AP Poll ==
Team	23-Nov	30-Nov	7-Dec	14-Dec	21-Dec	28-Dec	4-Jan	11-Jan	18-Jan	25-Jan	1-Feb	8-Feb	15-Feb	22-Feb	1-Feb	7-Mar	14-Mar
Tennessee	1	1	1	3	3	3	4	4	4	4	4	4	3	3	3	3	1
Iowa	6	6	5	5	5	5	1	1	1	1	1	1	1	1	2	2	2
Auburn	3	3	3	2	2	2	2	3	3	3	3	3	2	2	1	1	3
Texas	2	2	2	1	1	1	5	5	5	5	5	5	4	4	4	4	4
Louisiana Tech	5	5	4	4	4	4	3	2	2	2	2	2	5	5	5	5	5
Ohio St.	11	10	9	8	9	9	8	8	8	8	9	9	8	7	6	6	6
Long Beach St.	4	4	7	9	11	11	12	12	9	9	14	14	12	12	10	8	7
Rutgers	9	9	10	10	8	8	10	9	10	14	8	6	6	6	7	9	8
Maryland	–	–	–	20	16	16	15	14	14	12	12	11	13	13	11	10	9
Virginia	7	7	6	6	6	6	7	7	7	6	6	8	7	9	9	7	10
Washington	15	15	16	15	14	14	17	16	12	11	11	12	11	11	13	12	11
Ole Miss	8	8	8	7	7	7	6	6	6	7	7	7	10	10	12	13	12
Stanford	20	17	15	14	12	12	11	10	11	10	10	10	9	8	8	11	13
James Madison	–	–	20	18	19	19	–	–	–	20	18	19	18	17	16	15	14
Southern California	13	13	18	–	–	–	–	18	16	15	19	18	15	16	15	14	15
Montana	–	–	–	–	–	–	–	19	18	16	15	15	14	14	14	16	16
Georgia	10	11	12	12	17	17	13	13	15	13	13	13	16	15	17	17	17
New Mexico St.	–	–	–	–	–	–	–	–	–	–	–	20	19	18	18	18	18
Stephen F. Austin	–	–	–	–	–	–	–	–	–	–	20	17	–	19	19	19	19
La Salle	–	–	–	–	–	–	–	–	–	–	–	–	17	–	–	20	20
Clemson	–	–	–	–	–	–	–	–	–	–	–	–	–	20	–	–	–
DePaul	–	–	–	–	–	–	–	–	–	–	–	–	–	–	20	–	–
Duke	19	18	14	13	10	10	9	11	13	17	17	–	–	–	–	–	–
Houston	–	–	–	–	–	–	19	20	–	–	–	–	–	–	–	–	–
Illinois	–	–	–	19	20	20	–	–	–	–	–	–	–	–	–	–	–
Old Dominion	18	20	–	–	–	–	–	–	–	–	–	–	–	–	–	–	–
Penn St.	–	–	–	–	–	–	20	–	–	–	–	–	–	–	–	–	–
Saint Joseph’s	17	16	–	–	–	–	–	–	–	–	–	–	–	–	–	–	–
Southern Ill.	16	14	13	–	–	–	–	–	–	–	–	–	–	–	–	–	–
UNLV	–	–	19	17	18	18	16	17	19	–	–	–	–	–	–	–	–
Vanderbilt	14	19	17	16	15	15	18	–	–	–	–	–	–	–	–	–	–
Wake Forest	–	–	–	–	–	–	–	–	20	18	16	16	20	–	–	–	–
Western Ky.	12	12	11	11	13	13	14	15	17	19	–	–	–	–	–	–	–

== USA Today Coaches poll ==
Team	23-Nov	1-Dec	8-Dec	15-Dec	22-Dec	29-Dec	5-Jan	12-Jan	19-Jan	26-Jan	2-Feb	9-Feb	16-Feb	23-Feb	1-Mar	8-Mar	15-Mar	22-Mar
Louisiana Tech	5	5	4	3	3	3	2	2	2	2	2	2	5	5	T4	T5	5	1
Auburn	3	3	3	2	2	2	3	3	3	3	3	3	2	2	1	1	2	2
Tennessee	1	1	1	4	4	4	4	4	4	4	4	4	3	3	2	2	1	3
Long Beach St.	4	4	8	12	13	12	12	12	8	16	14	14	12	12	11	8	9	4
Texas	2	2	2	1	1	1	6	6	5	5	5	5	4	4	T4	4	4	5
Iowa	7	6	5	5	5	5	1	1	1	1	1	1	1	1	3	3	3	6
Virginia	9	8	6	6	6	6	7	7	7	6	6	7	7	10	9	7	10	7
Maryland	23	25	23	19	14	15	14	13	14	13	T12	12	13	13	12	10	7	8
Ohio St.	13	11	10	8	11	11	10	9	11	8	10	10	10	8	6	T5	6	9
Georgia	8	10	12	9	19	19	15	14	16	12	T12	13	17	16	17	16	16	10
Rutgers	10	9	9	10	8	8	11	10	10	9	8	6	6	6	7	9	8	11
Ole Miss	6	7	7	7	7	7	5	5	6	7	7	8	9	9	10	11	12	12
Southern California	14	13	19	24	23	24	22	21	18	15	21	20	18	17	16	12	13	13
Stanford	22	19	15	14	10	10	9	8	12	10	9	9	8	7	8	14	15	14
James Madison	21	22	18	17	17	17	21	18	15	14	T15	18	16	15	15	15	14	15
Washington	16	17	16	16	T15	16	16	16	13	11	11	11	11	11	14	13	11	16
Montana	–	–	–	–	–	–	24	22	20	18	T15	15	14	14	13	17	17	17
Stephen F. Austin	–	–	–	–	–	–	25	25	22	21	18	17	15	18	19	19	19	18
Western Ky.	11	12	11	11	T15	14	18	15	17	20	23	23	22	24	–	–	20	19
Clemson	–	–	–	–	–	–	–	–	–	–	–	–	–	25	25	23	21	20
Saint Joseph’s	17	15	–	–	–	–	–	–	–	–	–	–	–	–	–	25	25	21
DePaul	–	–	–	–	–	–	–	–	–	–	–	25	24	22	20	24	–	22
New Mexico St.	–	–	–	–	–	–	–	–	–	–	25	24	21	19	18	18	18	23
South Carolina	–	–	–	–	–	–	–	–	–	–	–	–	–	–	–	–	–	24
Houston	–	–	–	25	25	22	20	19	–	–	–	–	–	–	–	–	–	25
Duke	T18	16	13	13	9	9	8	11	9	17	19	–	–	–	–	–	–	–
Illinois	–	24	22	20	20	20	–	–	–	–	–	–	–	–	–	–	–	–
LSU	20	20	24	22	24	23	23	24	21	25	–	–	–	–	–	–	–	–
Nebraska	–	–	–	–	–	–	–	–	25	23	24	21	25	–	24	–	24	–
New Orleans	–	–	–	–	–	–	–	–	24	24	20	19	20	23	21	21	–	–
Old Dominion	T18	21	25	–	–	–	–	–	–	–	–	–	–	–	–	–	–	–
Penn St.	24	23	20	21	22	21	19	23	–	–	–	–	–	–	–	–	–	–
Southern Ill.	15	14	14	23	21	25	–	–	–	–	–	–	–	–	–	–	–	–
UNLV	25	–	21	18	18	18	13	17	19	22	22	22	23	20	22	20	22	–
Vanderbilt	12	18	17	15	12	13	17	20	–	–	–	–	–	–	–	–	–	–
Wake Forest	–	–	–	–	–	–	–	–	23	19	17	16	19	21	23	22	23	–
