= Teresa Weatherspoon =

American basketball player and coach (born 1965)

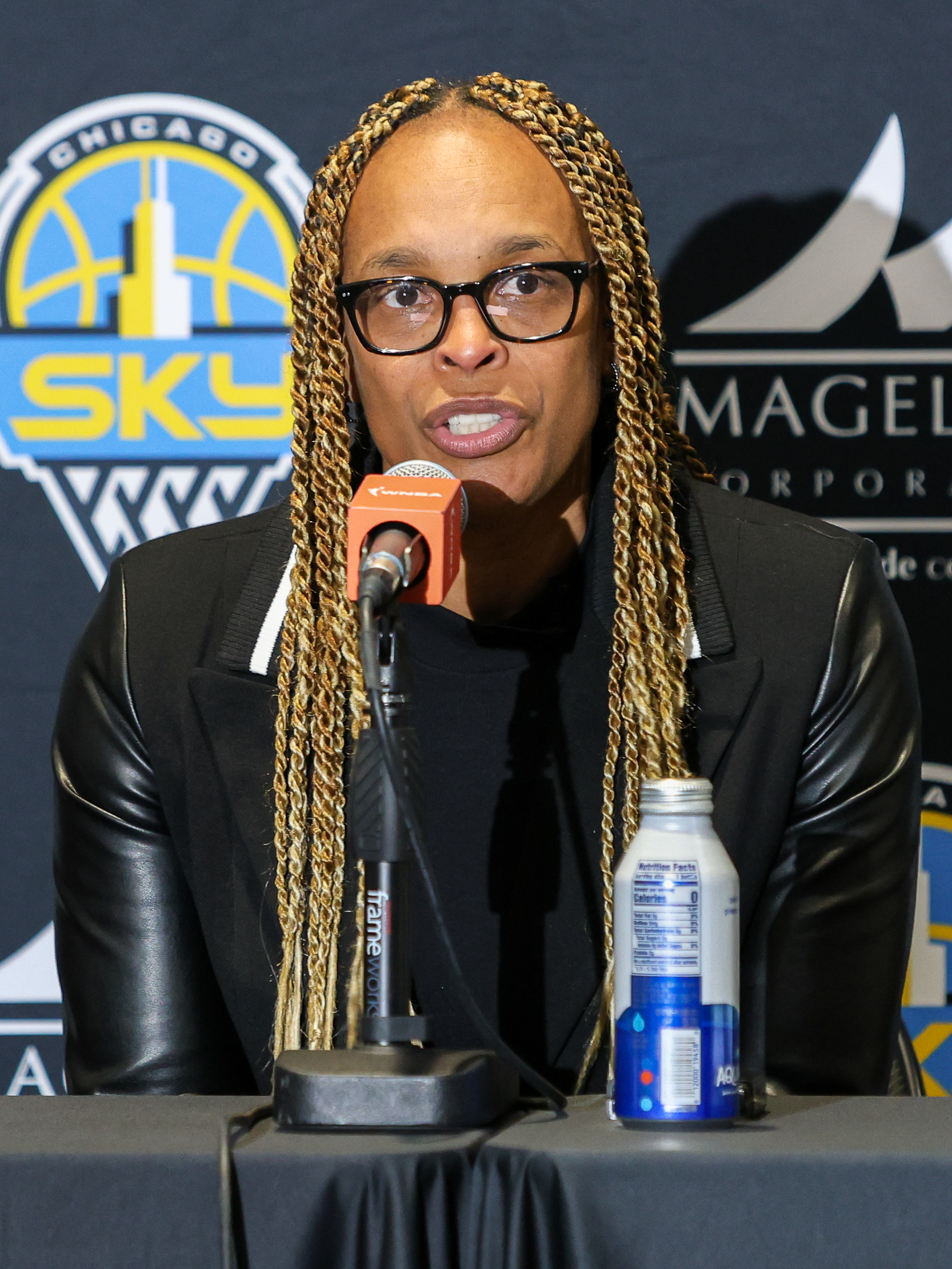
- Weatherspoon introduction as Chicago Sky head coach, 2023

Vinyl BC
- Title: Head coach
- League: Unrivaled

Personal information
- Born: December 8, 1965 (age 60) Pineland, Texas, U.S.
- Listed height: 5 ft 8 in (1.73 m)
- Listed weight: 161 lb (73 kg)

Career information
- High school: West Sabine (Pineland, Texas)
- College: Louisiana Tech (1984–1988)
- Playing career: 1988–2004
- Position: Guard
- Number: 11
- Coaching career: 2007–present

Career history

Playing
- 1988–1992: Busto Arsizio
- 1992–1993: Magenta
- 1993–1994: Como
- 1994–1996: CSKA Moscow
- 1997–2003: New York Liberty
- 2004: Los Angeles Sparks

Coaching
- 2007–2008: Westchester Phantoms
- 2008–2009: Louisiana Tech (associate HC)
- 2009–2014: Louisiana Tech
- 2020–2023: New Orleans Pelicans (assistant)
- 2024: Chicago Sky
- 2025–present: Vinyl BC

Career highlights
- 2× WNBA Defensive Player of the Year (1997, 1998); 5× WNBA All-Star (1999–2003); 4× All-WNBA Second Team (1997–2000); WNBA assist champion (1997); 2× WNBA steals champion (1997, 1998); WNBA anniversary teams (15th, 20th); 6× Italian League All-Star (1989–1994); NCAA champion (1988); 2× WAC regular season champion (2009, 2011); WAC Tournament champion (2010); Wade Trophy (1988); Honda Sports Award for basketball (1988); 2× Kodak All-American (1987, 1988); America South Player of the Year (1988); Broderick Cup winner (1988)

Career statistics
- Overall record: 99–71
- Stats at Basketball Reference
- Basketball Hall of Fame
- Women's Basketball Hall of Fame
Medals
Women's basketball
Representing United States
FIBA World Championship for Women
Gold medal – first place	1986 Moscow	Team competition
Olympic Games
Gold medal – first place	1988 Seoul	Team competition
Bronze medal – third place	1992 Barcelona	Team competition

Teresa Gaye Weatherspoon (born December 8, 1965) is an American professional basketball coach and former player who is the head coach for Vinyl BC of the Unrivaled basketball league. She was previously the head coach of the Chicago Sky of the Women's National Basketball Association (WNBA). She played for the New York Liberty and Los Angeles Sparks of the WNBA and served as the head basketball coach of the Louisiana Tech Lady Techsters. Weatherspoon was inducted into the Women's Basketball Hall of Fame in 2010, and the Naismith Memorial Basketball Hall of Fame in 2019. In 2011, she was voted in by fans as one of the Top 15 players in WNBA history. In 2016, Weatherspoon was chosen to the WNBA Top 20@20, a list of the league's best 20 players ever in celebration of the WNBA's 20th anniversary.

== Professional career ==
Born in Pineland, Texas, Weatherspoon was a health and physical education major and star basketball player at Louisiana Tech. In 1988, her senior season, she led the Lady Techsters to the NCAA national title. After college, Weatherspoon played overseas in Italy, France and Russia for 8 years.

=== WNBA ===
In 1997, Weatherspoon became one of the original players of the WNBA when she joined the New York Liberty for the league's inaugural season. Her debut game, a 67–57 win over the Los Angeles Sparks, was played on June 21, 1997. In that game Weatherspoon recorded 3 points, 7 rebounds and 10 assists (the first player in WNBA history to record double-digit assists in a game). A talented ball-handler and charismatic leader, her energetic play quickly endeared her to the fans and media in New York. The Liberty reached the first WNBA finals, but fell short to the Houston Comets. Weatherspoon was the first winner of the league's Defensive Player of the Year Award.

The Liberty finished the 1998 season 18 - 12 behind Weatherspoon's averages of 6.8 points, 4 rebounds and 6.4 assists. However, the team missed the playoffs. Weatherspoon would win the Defensive Player of the Year Award again in 1998 becoming the first back to back recipient of the award.

Having a similar productive season with the Liberty in 1999 (in addition to being selected as a 1999 All-Star), Weatherspoon and the team were able to make it back to the Finals with an 18 - 14 record. During the 1999 WNBA Finals, Weatherspoon had one of the most memorable feats in WNBA history; in Game 2 on September 4, 1999, the Liberty were down 67–65 against the Houston Comets with no timeouts left and 2.4 seconds left on the game clock after a shot made by Tina Thompson. After receiving the inbound pass, Weatherspoon dribbled the ball up to half court and made a game-winning shot 50 feet away from the basket to force a Game 3. That moment would later be referred to as "The Shot".

Weatherspoon made the All-Star Team every year from 2000 to 2003, maintaining a high level of scoring and rebounding productivity and earning a reputation for toughness and reliability. The Liberty would make the Finals in 2000 and 2002 (the team's fourth appearances with Weatherspoon) but lost the Finals both times, being swept by the Comets in 2000 and swept by the Sparks in 2002.

The 2003 season would be the first time the Liberty had a losing record, as they finished the season 16 - 18 and missed the playoffs for only the 2nd time in 6 years.

Weatherspoon had the distinction of being the only WNBA player to start every one of her games until the 2004 season. From 1997 to 2003, she played in 220 games and started in every one of them.

Weatherspoon signed with the Sparks on February 4, 2004. Her time with the Sparks saw a change in Weatherspoon's role, as she came off the bench for the first time in her career and played an average of only 8.6 minutes per game (after averaging 31.1 with the Liberty). The Sparks finished 25 - 9 but were eliminated in the first round of the 2004 playoffs.

Weatherspoon's final WNBA game ever was Game 2 of the 2004 Western Conference First Round on September 26, 2004, against the Sacramento Monarchs. The Sparks won the game 71 – 57 and evened the series 1 – 1 with Weatherspoon recording 2 rebounds in 3 minutes. However, Weatherspoon did not play in Game 3 and the Sparks lost that game 58 – 73 and were eliminated from the playoffs. After her 2004 season with the Sparks, Weatherspoon retired.

== Coaching career ==
=== Westchester Phantoms (2007-2008) ===
In 2007 Weatherspoon was the head coach of the Westchester Phantoms of the American Basketball Association.

=== Louisiana Tech (2008-2014) ===
In April 2008 she joined the coaching staff of the Lady Techsters of Louisiana Tech. On February 9, 2009, she was promoted to interim head coach to replace former head coach Chris Long. April 2, 2009, saw Louisiana Tech shed the interim label and name Teresa head women's basketball coach.

=== New Orleans Pelicans (2019–2023) ===
On September 26, 2019, Weatherspoon was named two-way player development coach for the New Orleans Pelicans. Weatherspoon was later promoted to a full-time assistant coach for the Pelicans on November 16, 2020. The Pelicans released Weatherspoon from the coaching staff in June 2023.

=== Chicago Sky (2023-2024) ===
On October 12, 2023, Weatherspoon was hired to be the Head Coach of the Chicago Sky of the WNBA.

On September 26, 2024, after the Sky failed to make the playoffs, Weatherspoon was fired. Sky player Angel Reese posted on social media that she was "heartbroken" at the news, saying that Weatherspoon "was the only person that believed in me. The one that trusted me," and calling her an "unsung hero" in Reese's life.

=== Unrivaled (2025–present) ===
On November 15, 2024, Weatherspoon was announced to be one of the six new head coaches of the Unrivaled basketball league.

== National team career ==
Weatherspoon was selected to represent the US at the inaugural Goodwill games, held in Moscow in July 1986. North Carolina State's Kay Yow served as head coach. The team opened up with a 72–53 of Yugoslavia, and followed that with a 21-point win over Brazil 91–70. The third game was against Czechoslovakia and would be much closer, ending in a 78–70 victory. The USA faced Bulgaria in the semi-final match up, and again won, this time 67–58. This set up the final against the Soviet Union, led by 7-foot-2 Ivilana Semenova, considered the most dominant player in the world. The Soviet team, had a 152–2 record in major international competition over the prior three decades, including an 84–82 win over the US in the 1983 World Championships. The Soviets held the early edge, leading 21–19 at one time, before the USA went on a scoring run to take a large lead they would never relinquish. The final score was 83–60 in favor of the US, earning the gold medal for the USA squad. For the entire event, Teresa Gaye Weatherspoon averaged 1.6 points per game.

Weatherspoon continued with the National team at the 1986 World Championship, held in Moscow, a month after the Goodwill games in Moscow, although she was injured and unable to play. The USA team was even more dominant this time. The early games were won easily, and the semifinal against Canada, while the closest game for the USA so far, ended up an 82–59 victory. At the same time, the Soviet team was winning easily as well, and the final game pitted two teams each with 6–0 records. The Soviet team, having lost only once at home, wanted to show that the Goodwill games setback was a fluke. The USA team started by scoring the first eight points, and raced to a 45–23 lead, although the Soviets fought back and reduced the halftime margin to 13. The USA went on a 15–1 run in the second half to put the game away, and ended up winning the gold medal with a score of 108–88.

Weatherspoon was selected to be a member of the team representing the US at the 1987 World University Games held in Zagreb, Yugoslavia. The USA team won four of the five contests. After winning their first two games against Poland and Finland, the USA faced the host team Yugoslavia. The game went to overtime, but Yugoslavia prevailed, 93–89. The USA faced China in the next game. They won 84–83, but they needed to win by at least five points to remain in medal contention. They won the final game against Canada to secure fifth place. Weatherspoon averaged 8.6 points per games. She recorded 21 steals over the course of the event, tied for first place on the team.

== Head coaching record ==
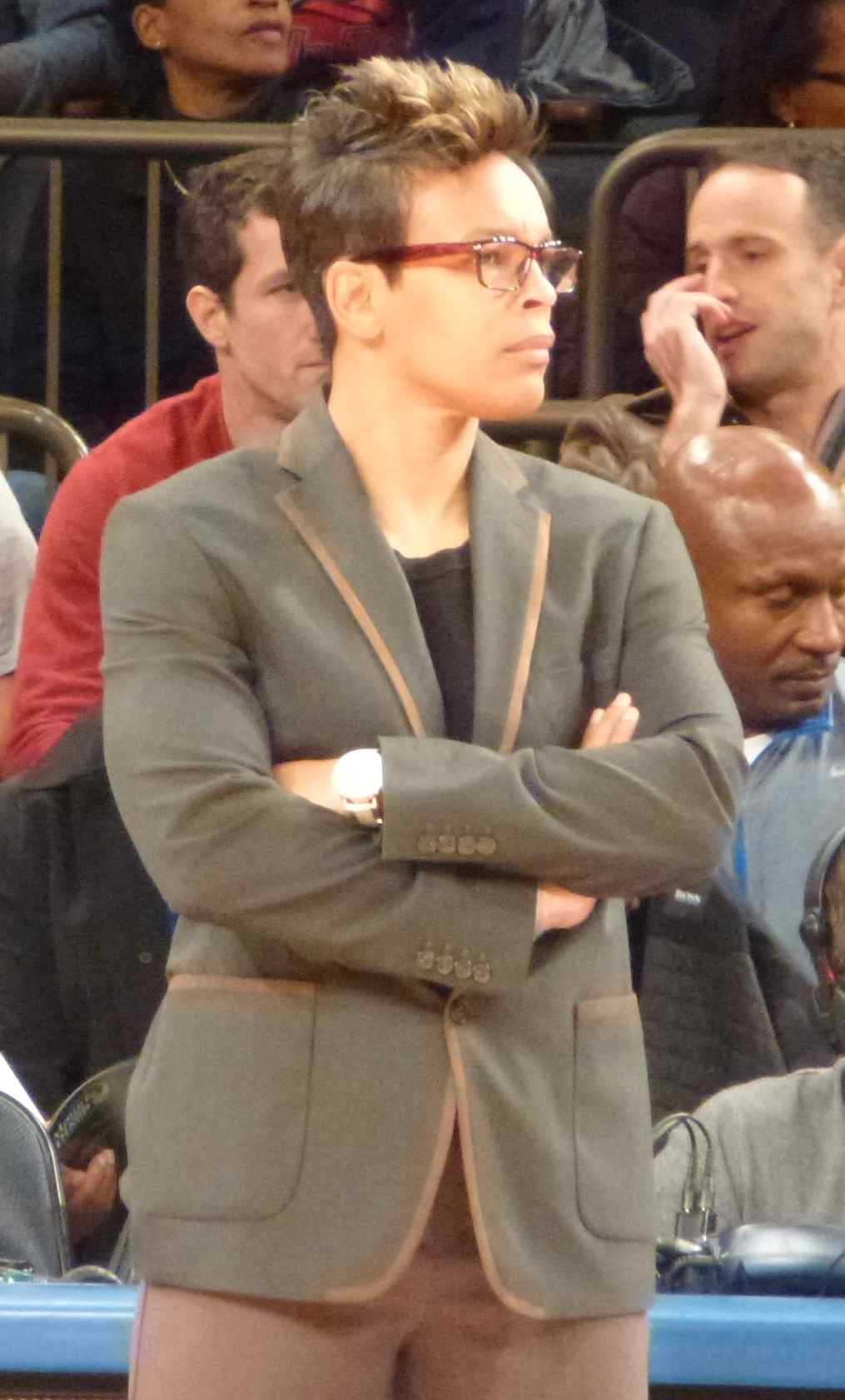
Weatherspoon coaching for Louisiana Tech in 2012

Record table
Season	Team	Overall	Conference	Standing	Postseason
Louisiana Tech Lady Techsters (Western Athletic Conference) (2009–2013)
2008–09	Louisiana Tech	9–2	8–0	T–1st	WNIT Second Round
2009–10	Louisiana Tech	23–9	11–5	2nd	NCAA First Round
2010–11	Louisiana Tech	24–8	15–1	1st	NCAA First Round
2011–12	Louisiana Tech	17–15	8–6	3rd	
2012–13	Louisiana Tech	14–17	9–9	5th	
Louisiana Tech Lady Techsters (Conference USA) (2013–2014)
2013–14	Louisiana Tech	12–20	5–11	14th	
Louisiana Tech:		99–71	56–32		
Total:		99–71			
National champion Postseason invitational champion Conference regular season champion Conference regular season and conference tournament champion Division regular season champion Division regular season and conference tournament champion Conference tournament champion

=== WNBA ===
Legend
Regular season	G	Games coached	W	Games won	L	Games lost	W–L %	Win–loss %
Playoffs	PG	Playoff games	PW	Playoff wins	PL	Playoff losses	PW–L %	Playoff win–loss %

Team	Year	G	W	L	W–L%	Finish	PG	PW	PL	PW–L%	Result
CHI	2024	40	13	27	.325	6th in Eastern	—	—	—		Missed Playoffs
Career		40	13	27	.325		0	0	0	–	

== Personal life ==
Weatherspoon was born to Charles and Rowena Weatherspoon in Pineland, Texas. Her father, Charles Sr., played minor league baseball in the Minnesota Twins' farm system, and holds the record for the most grand slams (three) in a minor league game. Weatherspoon has two brothers and three sisters. She credits her family, especially her mother Rowena Weatherspoon, as the biggest influence on her basketball career. Her fans call her by her nicknames "T-Spoon" or "Spoon". She and former Atlanta Falcons linebacker Sean Weatherspoon are second cousins.

In 1999, she published a book titled Teresa Weatherspoon's Basketball for Girls, filled with anecdotes and advice on improving basketball skills for young girls.

== Career highlights ==
- WNBA no. 2 all-time in career assists
- Led the New York Liberty to the first ever WNBA Finals in 1997 and again in 1999
- Started in the first five WNBA All-Star games (1999–2003 )
- All-WNBA Second Team (1997–2000)
- WNBA Defensive Player of the Year (1997, 1998)
- Hit a memorable half-court shot to tie the WNBA Finals series with the Houston Comets in 1999
- Started all her WNBA games up until the 2003 season
- Inducted into the Naismith Basketball Hall of Fame, Class of 2019

== Career statistics ==
Legend
GP	Games played	GS	Games started	MPG	Minutes per game	RPG	Rebounds per game
APG	Assists per game	SPG	Steals per game	BPG	Blocks per game	PPG	Points per game
TO	Turnovers per game	FG%	Field-goal percentage	3P%	3-point field-goal percentage	FT%	Free-throw percentage
**Bold**	Career best	°	League leader

=== WNBA ===
‡	WNBA record

==== Regular season ====
Year	Team	GP	GS	MPG	FG%	3P%	FT%	RPG	APG	SPG	BPG	TO	PPG
1997	New York	28	28	33.0	**.467**	.086	.650	**4.1**	6.2°	3.0°	.1	3.4	7.0
1998	New York	30	30	33.4	.388	.327	.609	4.0	**6.4**	**3.3**‡	.0	3.2	6.8
1999	New York	32	32	**33.9**	.421	.378	.679	3.3	**6.4**	2.4	.1	2.5	**7.2**
2000	New York	32	32	33.7	.438	.250	.741	3.4	**6.4**	2.0	**.2**	2.7	6.4
2001	New York	32	32	30.4	.431	**.385**	.671	3.7	6.3	1.7	.1	2.5	6.5
2002	New York	32	32	29.8	.342	.100	.519	2.7	5.7	1.3	.1	2.4	3.4
2003	New York	**34**	**34**	24.2	.385	.000	**.750**	2.9	4.4	.8	.1	1.8	2.9
2004	Los Angeles	**34**	0	8.6	.320	.333	—	.9	.9	.4	.0	**.8**	.5
Career		254	220	28.1	.411	.281	.658	3.1	5.3	1.8	.1	2.4	5.0

==== Playoffs ====
Year	Team	GP	GS	MPG	FG%	3P%	FT%	RPG	APG	SPG	BPG	TO	PPG
1997	New York	2	2	**37.5**	**.500**	.000	.000	1.5	5.0	2.0	.0	6.0	5.0
1999	New York	6	6	33.8	.452	**.368**	.750	3.5	**7.5**°	1.0	.0	2.0	**8.5**
2000	New York	7	7	36.1	.353	.200	.636	2.7	7.0°	**2.7**	.0	2.9	4.6
2001	New York	6	6	33.0	.211	.273	**1.000**	3.7	4.7	1.2	.0	**.8**	3.8
2002	New York	**8**	**8**	30.1	.475	.000	.833	**4.4**	6.6	1.0	.0	1.8	6.6
2004	Los Angeles	2	0	5.0	.000	.000	.000	1.0	.5	.5	.0	1.5	.0
Career		31	29	31.6	.382	.282	.744	3.3	6.0	1.5	.0	2.1	5.5

=== College ===
Year	Team	GP	Points	FG%	3P%	FT%	RPG	APG	SPG	BPG	PPG
1985	Louisiana Tech	**33**	195	51.4%	NA	51.0%	3.8	7.2	NA	NA	5.9
1986	Louisiana Tech	32	281	48.7%	NA	54.5%	3.9	**7.9**	NA	NA	8.8
1987	Louisiana Tech	**33**	**311**	**52.1%**	NA	**70.5%**	4.2	8.2	NA	NA	**9.4**
1988	Louisiana Tech	**33**	300	47.8%	**35.7%**	64.0%	**4.4**	6.0	**3.1**	**0.3**	9.1
Career		131	1087	49.8%	35.7%	59.6%	4.1	7.3	0.8	0.1	8.3

== Awards and honors ==
As a basketball player:

- 1986 World Championships Gold Medalist (with Team USA)
- 1986 Goodwill Games Gold Medalist (with Team USA)
- 1987 World University Games Gold Medalist (with Team USA)
- 1988 Olympic Games Gold Medalist (with Team USA)
- 1988 Wade Trophy
- 1988 Honda Sports Award for basketball
- 1988 Honda-Broderick Cup winner for all sports
- 1992 Olympic Games Bronze Medalist (with Team USA)
- 2010 Inducted into the Women's Basketball Hall of Fame as part of the class of 2010
- 2010 Inducted into the Louisiana Sports Hall of Fame
- 2011 Inducted into the New York Liberty Ring of Honor
- 2011 Named one of the top 15 WNBA Players of All-Time
- 2016 Named to the WNBA Top 20@20 list
- 2019 Inducted into the Naismith Memorial Basketball Hall of Fame
- 2020 Inducted into the Texas Sports Hall of Fame

As head coach of Louisiana Tech Lady Techsters:

- 2009 WAC Regular Season Champions
- 2009 WNIT Second Round
- 2010 WAC Tournament Champions
- 2010 NCAA Tournament
- 2010 Maggie Dixon Division I Rookie Coach of the Year
- 2011 WAC Regular Season Champions
- 2011 NCAA Tournament
- 2011 WBCA Region 7 Coach of the Year

== See also ==
- List of female NBA coaches
- 1987 NCAA Women's Division I Basketball Tournament
- List of NCAA Division I women's basketball career assists leaders
