= 1988 NCAA Division I women's basketball tournament =

Women's college basketball championship

- Teams: 40
- Finals site: Tacoma Dome, Tacoma, Washington
- Champions: Louisiana Tech Lady Techsters (2nd title, 4th title game, 5th Final Four)
- Runner-up: Auburn Tigers (1st title game, 1st Final Four)
- Semifinalists: Tennessee Volunteers (5th Final Four); Long Beach State 49ers (2nd Final Four)
- Winning coach: Leon Barmore (1st title)
- MOP: Erica Westbrooks (Louisiana Tech)

The 1988 NCAA Division I women's basketball tournament began on March 16 and ended on April 3. The tournament featured 40 teams. The Final Four consisted of Long Beach State, Auburn, Tennessee, and Louisiana Tech. Louisiana Tech won its second title with a 56–54 victory over Auburn. Louisiana Tech's Erica Westbrooks was named the Most Outstanding Player of the tournament.

== Notable events ==
Long Beach state reached the Final Four averaging over 100 points per game. Long Beach beat Colorado 103–64 in their opening game. Long Beach then defeated the three seed Washington 104–78 in the West Regional semifinal. That matched Long Beach up with the one seed Iowa. Long Beach didn't score 100, but came close, beating the top seed in their regional by a score of 98–78, allowing Long Beach to reach the Final Four for the second straight year. Their opponent in the semifinal was Auburn, who had reached the Sweet Sixteen in 1985 and 1986, then followed it with a trip to the Elite Eight in 1987. This year Auburn advanced to the Final Four for the first time defeating Maryland in the Mideast Regional 103–74.

In the semifinal game, the Long Beach 49ers team started out slowly, but their coach Joan Bonvicini wasn't worried; she was convinced they would come back. Auburn had a small lead in the second half when the 49ers scored 11 consecutive points to take a 46–42 lead. However, the Tigers tied the game at 46 apiece, then 48 then 50 apiece. Then the Tigers opened up a seven-point lead. The 49ers cut it back to five points, but too many turnovers were too much to overcome. Ruthie Bolton scored eleven points in the final six minutes for the Tigers to help seal the 68–55 victory, and the right to play for the national championship.

The other semifinal game matched up Tennessee and Louisiana Tech. Tennessee was the defending national champion, having won their first national championship in 1987. They won the East Regional with a win over the two seed Virginia. Their opponent, Louisiana Tech, had won the first NCAA Tournament in 1982, and had finished as runner up to Tennessee in the previous year's championship game. The two teams met in the regular season, with Tennessee winning 76–74 in an overtime game played in Knoxville. The Lady Techsters were a two seed, but upset top ranked Texas 83–80 in the Midwest Regional to make it to the semifinal game. The Lady Techsters said they had been looking forward to this game ever since their loss in the prior year and they played like it. They took the lead early in the game and never relinquished it. Louisiana Tech held Tennessee to 33% shooting in the first half, and held on to win the game 68–59, and a berth in the championship game.

The first half of the championship game was all Auburn. Two minutes went by before the Lady Techsters even took at shot, at which point they were down 6–0. Ruthie Bolton scored 16 points in the first half, a source of frustration for her defender Teresa Weatherspoon. Bolton's points held the Tigers head to halftime with a 31–19 lead. Weatherspoon made sure the second half was different, both offensively, with seven assists and defensively, holding Bolton to zero points and helping to force six turnovers. The Tigers still led by four points with under five minutes left, but behind Weatherspoon's defense, and Erica Westbrooks' 25 points, Louisiana Tech came back to win their second national Championship by a score of 56–54.

== Records ==
Ruthie Bolton was credited with ten steals in the National Semifinal game, the most ever recorded in a Final Four game since the statistic has been recorded (starting in 1988).

== Qualifying teams – automatic ==
Forty teams were selected to participate in the 1988 NCAA Tournament. Eighteen conferences were eligible for an automatic bid to the 1988 NCAA tournament.

Automatic bids
		Record		
Qualifying School	Conference	Regular season	Conference	Seed
Bowling Green State University	MAC	24–5	14–2	10
Eastern Illinois University	Missouri Valley Conference	22–7	14–4	10
Fairfield University	MAAC	19–9	8–4	10
University of Iowa	Big Ten	27–1	17–1	1
James Madison University	Colonial	26–3	12–0	4
University of Kansas	Big Eight	21–9	8–6	7
California State University, Long Beach	Pacific Coast	25–5	18–0	2
University of Maryland	ACC	24–5	12–2	2
Middle Tennessee State University	Ohio Valley Conference	22–7	12–2	10
University of Montana	Mountain West	28–1	16–0	4
New Mexico State University	High Country	26–2	10–0	6
Rutgers University	Atlantic 10	26–4	17–1	3
University of South Carolina	Metro	22–10	10–2	8
St. John's University	Big East	21–9	10–6	7
University of Tennessee	SEC	28–2	8–1	1
University of Texas at Austin	Southwest	30–2	16–0	1
University of Washington	Pac-10	24–4	16–2	3
Western Kentucky University	Sun Belt Conference	26–7	4–2	5

== Qualifying teams – at-large ==
Twenty-two additional teams were selected to complete the forty invitations.

At-large Bids
		Record		
Qualifying School	Conference	Regular season	Conference	Seed
University of Alabama	Southeastern	18–9	5–4	9
Auburn University	Southeastern	28–2	9–0	1
Clemson University	Atlantic Coast	21–8	8–6	5
University of Colorado at Boulder	Big Eight	20–10	8–6	7
University of Georgia	Southeastern	20–9	5–4	4
University of Houston	Southwest	22–6	11–5	6
La Salle University	Metro Atlantic	25–4	11–1	8
Louisiana Tech University	American South	27–2	9–0	2
Louisiana State University	Southeastern	18–10	6–3	9
University of Mississippi (Ole Miss)	Southeastern	23–6	5–4	3
University of Nebraska–Lincoln	Big Eight	22–6	11–3	5
Ohio State University	Big Ten	24–4	16–2	3
Old Dominion University	Sun Belt	17–11	6–0	6
Pennsylvania State University	Atlantic 10	19–12	11–7	9
University of Southern California	Pacific-10	21–7	15–3	4
Saint Joseph's University	Atlantic 10	23–7	16–2	7
Stanford University	Pacific-10	26–4	14–4	5
Stephen F. Austin State University	Southland	28–4	13–1	8
Syracuse University	Big East	22–8	13–3	6
Villanova University	Big East	20–8	11–5	8
University of Virginia	Atlantic Coast	25–4	12–2	2
Wake Forest University	Atlantic Coast	22–7	9–5	9

== Bids by conference ==
Eighteen conferences earned an automatic bid. In eight cases, the automatic bid was the only representative from the conference. Two conferences, Southland and American South sent a single representative as an at-large team. Twenty additional at-large teams were selected from ten of the conferences.

Bids	Conference	Teams
6	Southeastern	Alabama, Auburn, Georgia, LSU, Ole Miss, Tennessee
4	Atlantic Coast	Clemson, Maryland., Virginia, Wake Forest
3	Pacific-10	Southern California, Stanford, Washington
3	Big Eight	Colorado, Kansas, Nebraska
3	Big East	St. John’s NY, Syracuse, Villanova
3	Atlantic 10	Penn St., Rutgers, St. Joseph’s
2	Sun Belt	Old Dominion, Western Ky.
2	Southwest	Houston, Texas
2	Metro Atlantic	Fairfield, La Salle
2	Big Ten	Iowa, Ohio St.
1	Southland	Stephen F. Austin
1	Ohio Valley	Middle Tenn.
1	Mountain West	Montana
1	Missouri Valley	Eastern Ill.
1	Mid-American	Bowling Green
1	Metro	South Carolina
1	High Country	New Mexico St.
1	Colonial	James Madison
1	Pacific Coast	Long Beach St.
1	American South	Louisiana Tech

== First and second rounds ==
In 1988, the field remained at 40 teams. The teams were seeded, and assigned to four geographic regions, with seeds 1-10 in each region. In Round 1, seeds 8 and 9 faced each other for the opportunity to face the 1 seed in the second round, while seeds 7 and 10 faced each other for the opportunity to face the 2 seed. In the first two rounds, the higher seed was given the opportunity to host the first round game. In most cases, the higher seed accepted the opportunity. The exception:

- Seventh seeded Colorado played tenth seeded Eastern Illinois at Eastern Illinois

The following table lists the region, host school, venue and the twenty-four first and second round locations:

1988 NCAA first round (The pogs for Lasalle (Philadelphia), St. Joe's (Philadelphia) and Villanova overlap)
1988 NCAA second round

Region	Rnd	Host	Venue	City	State
East	1	Villanova University	The Pavilion	Villanova	Pennsylvania
East	1	Saint John's University	Alumni Hall (Carnesecca)	Queens	New York
East	2	Rutgers University	Louis Brown Athletic Center	Piscataway	New Jersey
East	2	University of Virginia	University Hall (University of Virginia)	Charlottesville	Virginia
East	2	University of Tennessee	Stokely Athletic Center	Knoxville	Tennessee
East	2	James Madison University	James Madison University Convocation Center	Harrisonburg	Virginia
Mideast	1	Saint Joseph's University	Alumni Memorial Fieldhouse	Philadelphia	Pennsylvania
Mideast	1	La Salle University	Hayman Hall (Tom Gola Arena)	Philadelphia	Pennsylvania
Mideast	2	University of Maryland	Cole Field House	College Park	Maryland
Mideast	2	Ohio State University	St. John Arena	Columbus	Ohio
Mideast	2	Auburn University	Memorial Coliseum (Beard–Eaves–Memorial Coliseum)	Auburn	Alabama
Mideast	2	University of Georgia	Georgia Coliseum (Stegeman Coliseum)	Athens	Georgia
Midwest	1	University of South Carolina	Carolina Coliseum	Columbia	South Carolina
Midwest	1	University of Kansas	Allen Field House	Lawrence	Kansas
Midwest	2	University of Montana	Dahlberg Arena	Missoula	Montana
Midwest	2	University of Texas	Frank Erwin Center	Austin	Texas
Midwest	2	University of Mississippi (Ole Miss)	Tad Smith Coliseum	Oxford	Mississippi
Midwest	2	Louisiana Tech University	Thomas Assembly Center	Ruston	Louisiana
West	1	Stephen F. Austin University	William R. Johnson Coliseum	Nacogdoches	Texas
West	1	Eastern Illinois University	Lantz Arena	Charleston	Illinois
West	2	University of Iowa	Carver–Hawkeye Arena	Iowa City	Iowa
West	2	University of Washington	Hec Edmundson Pavilion	Seattle	Washington
West	2	Long Beach State	University Gym (Gold Mine)	Long Beach	California

== Regionals and Final Four ==
1988 NCAA regionals and Final Four

The regionals, named for the general location, were held from March 24 to March 26 at these sites:

- Mideast Regional Georgia Coliseum (Stegeman Coliseum), Athens, Georgia (Host: University of Georgia)
- Midwest Regional Frank Erwin Center, Austin, Texas (Host: University of Texas)
- West Regional University Gym (Gold Mine), Long Beach, California (Host: Long Beach State)
- East Regional Old Dominion University Fieldhouse, Norfolk, Virginia (Host: Old Dominion University)

Each regional winner advanced to the Final Four, held April 1 and April 3 in Tacoma, Washington at the Tacoma Dome, hosted by the University of Washington.

== Bids by state ==
The forty teams came from twenty-five states. Pennsylvania had the most teams with four. Twenty-five states did not have any teams receiving bids.

NCAA Women's basketball Tournament invitations by state 1988

Bids	State	Teams
4	Pennsylvania	La Salle, Penn St., St. Joseph’s, Villanova
3	California	Long Beach St., Southern California, Stanford
3	Texas	Texas, Houston, Stephen F. Austin
3	Virginia	James Madison, Old Dominion, Virginia
2	Alabama	Alabama, Auburn
2	Alabama	Alabama, Auburn
2	Louisiana	Louisiana Tech, LSU
2	New York	St. John’s NY, Syracuse
2	Ohio	Bowling Green, Ohio St.
2	South Carolina	South Carolina, Clemson
2	Tennessee	Middle Tenn., Tennessee
1	Colorado	Colorado
1	Connecticut	Fairfield
1	Georgia	Georgia
1	Illinois	Eastern Ill.
1	Iowa	Iowa
1	Kansas	Kansas
1	Kentucky	Western Ky.
1	Maryland	Maryland.
1	Mississippi	Ole Miss
1	Montana	Montana
1	Nebraska	Nebraska
1	New Jersey	Rutgers
1	New Mexico	New Mexico St.
1	North Carolina	Wake Forest
1	Washington	Washington

== Brackets ==
First and second round games played at higher seed except where noted.

=== West regional – Long Beach, CA (Long Beach Arena) ===
First round March 16
8	Stephen F. Austin	84
9	LSU	62
7	Colorado	78
10	at Eastern Illinois	72

Second round March 19–20
8	Stephen F. Austin	65
1	Iowa	83
5	Nebraska	82
4	Southern California	100
7	Colorado	64
2	Long Beach St.	103
3	Washington	99
6	New Mexico St.	74

Regional semifinals March 24
1	Iowa	79
4	Southern California	67
2	Long Beach St.	104
3	Washington	78

Regional finals March 26
1	Iowa	78
2	Long Beach St.	98

=== Mideast regional – Athens, GA (Stegeman Coliseum) ===
First round March 16
8	La Salle	85
9	Penn St.	86
7	St. Joseph's	68
10	Bowling Green	66

Second round March 19–20
9	Penn St.	66
1	Auburn	94
5	Western Kentucky	66
4	Georgia	84
7	St. Joseph's	67
2	Maryland	78
3	Ohio St.	116
6	Syracuse	75

Regional semifinals March 24
1	Auburn	68
4	Georgia	65
2	Maryland	81
3	Ohio St.	66

Regional finals March 26
1	Auburn	103
2	Maryland	74

=== East regional – Norfolk, VA (Old Dominion University Fieldhouse) ===
First round March 16
8	Villanova	51
9	Wake Forest	53
7	St. John's (NY)	83
10	Fairfield	70

Second round March 19–20
9	Wake Forest	66
1	Tennessee	94
5	Clemson	63
4	James Madison	70
7	St. John's (NY)	64
2	Virginia	85
3	Rutgers	88
6	Old Dominion	78

Regional semifinals March 24
1	Tennessee	72
4	James Madison	52
2	Virginia	89
3	Rutgers	75

Regional finals March 26
1	Tennessee	84
2	Virginia	76

=== Midwest regional – Austin, Texas (Frank Erwin Center) ===
First round March 16
8	South Carolina	77
9	Alabama	63
7	Kansas	81
10	Middle Tennessee St.	75

Second round March 19–20
8	South Carolina	58
1	Texas	77
5	Stanford	74
4	Montana	72 (OT)
7	Kansas	50
2	Louisiana Tech	89
3	Ole Miss	74
6	Houston	68

Regional semifinals March 24
1	Texas	79
5	Stanford	58
2	Louisiana Tech	80
3	Ole Miss	60

Regional finals March 26
1	Texas	80
2	Louisiana Tech	83

=== Final Four – Tacoma, WA (Tacoma Dome) ===
National semifinals April 1
2W	Long Beach St.	55
1ME	Auburn	68
1E	Tennessee	59
2MW	Louisiana Tech	68

National championship April 3
1ME	Auburn	54
2MW	Louisiana Tech	56

== Record by conference ==
Fifteen conferences had more than one bid, or at least one win in NCAA Tournament play:

Conference	# of Bids	Record	Win %	Round of 32	Sweet Sixteen	Elite Eight	Final Four	Championship Game
Southeastern	6	9–6	.600	4	4	2	2	1
Atlantic Coast	4	5–4	.556	4	2	2	–	–
Atlantic 10	3	3–3	.500	3	1	–	–	–
Pacific-10	3	3–3	.500	3	3	–	–	–
Big Eight	3	2–3	.400	3	–	–	–	–
Big East	3	1–3	.250	2	–	–	–	–
Big Ten	2	3–2	.600	2	2	1	–	–
Southwest	2	2–2	.500	2	1	1	–	–
Metro Atlantic	2	0–2	–	–	–	–	–	–
Sun Belt	2	0–2	–	2	–	–	–	–
American South	1	5–0	1.000	1	1	1	1	1
Pacific Coast	1	3–1	.750	1	1	1	1	–
Colonial	1	1–1	.500	1	1	–	–	–
Metro	1	1–1	.500	1	–	–	–	–
Southland	1	1–1	.500	1	–	–	–	–

Five conferences went 0-1: High Country, MAC, Missouri Valley Conference, Mountain West, and Ohio Valley Conference

== All-Tournament team ==
- Erica Westbrooks, Louisiana Tech
- Teresa Weatherspoon, Louisiana Tech
- Ruthie Bolton, Auburn
- Diann McNeil, Auburn
- Penny Toler, Long Beach St.

== Game officials ==
- June Courteau (semifinal)
- Larry Sheppard (semifinal)
- Art Bomengen (Semi-Final, Final)
- Patty Broderick (Semi-Final, Final)

== See also ==
- 1988 NCAA Division I men's basketball tournament
- 1988 NCAA Division II women's basketball tournament
- 1988 NCAA Division III women's basketball tournament
- 1988 NAIA women's basketball tournament
